= 2020–21 KK Crvena zvezda season =

Crvena zvezda mts
2020–21 season
- ABA League champions
- Serbian League champions
- Serbian Cup champions
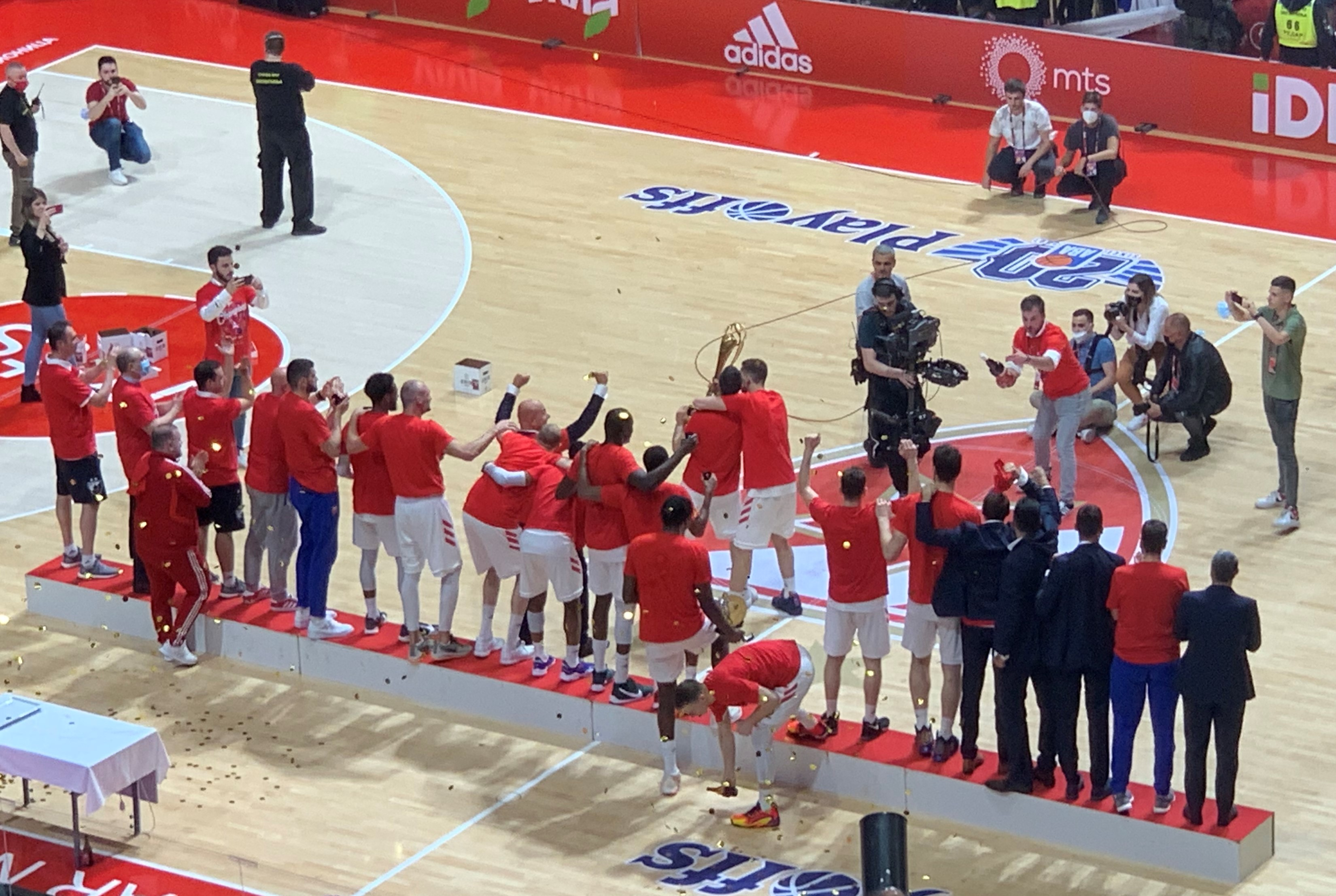
- ABA league champions
- President: (Serbia) Nebojša Čović
- Head coach: (Serbia) Saša Obradović (until 24 December 2020) (Montenegro) Dejan Radonjić (from 25 December 2020)
- Arena: Aleksandar Nikolić Hall
- ABA League: 1st
- Playoffs: Champions
- Serbian League: Champions
- EuroLeague: 17th
- Serbian Cup: Winner
- Adriatic Supercup: Canceled
- Biggest win: +61; 108–47 (Serbia) Radnički (11 February 2021)
- Biggest defeat: –29; 69–98 (Russia) Zenit (22 December 2020)
Home	Away
- All statistics correct as of April 9, 2021.

The 2020–21 KK Crvena zvezda season was the 76th season in the existence of the club. For the season it was referred to as KK Crvena zvezda mts for sponsorship reasons.

The season was the first to be played after the previous season was abandoned due to the COVID-19 pandemic.

== Summary ==
=== Pre-season ===
In May 2020, the 2019–20 season was canceled due to the COVID-19 pandemic in the Adriatic League and the EuroLeague. The Serbian SuperLeague had no start due to the COVID-19 pandemic. On 29 June 2020, the ABA League Assembly canceled the 2020 ABA Super Cup due to the COVID-19 pandemic.

On 25 August 2020, guard Marko Gušić officially signed a four-year professional contract.

On 8 September 2020, guards Dejan Davidovac and Ognjen Dobrić signed a two-year contract extensions. On 29 September, center Ognjen Kuzmić signed a two-year contract extension.

=== January ===
On 27 January 2021, center Johnny O'Bryant received a 10-day suspension from the club due to a conflict with head coach Dejan Radonjić during a game against Anadolu Efes.

=== February ===
On 6 February, it was reported that 10 players were infected with COVID-19. Reportedly, guards Corey Walden, Quino Colom, Langston Hall, and center Landry Nnoko as well as coaching staff members Nikola Birač, Saša Kosović, and Aleksandar Lukman were infected with the virus. On 9 February, head coach Radonjić announced the Zvezda squad for the Radivoj Korać Cup, adding Crvena zvezda U19 players Nikola Šaranović i Milutin Vujičić to the roster. On 10 February, it was reported that one more player was infected with COVID-19. Later that day, it was announced that the infected player is center Duop Reath. Instead of Reath, the club added center O'Bryant to the squad for Radivoj Korać Cup. The Zvezda won its 7th Cup title (10th overall) following a 73–60 win over Mega Soccerbet in the final.

On 23 February, guard Milutin Vujičić officially signed a four-year professional contract. On 24 February, Crvena zvezda signed professional contracts with two more teenagers from their youth system, center Filip Branković and guard Marko Mihailović.

=== March ===
Following a loss to Olympiacos, the club recorded its 8-in-a-row EuroLeague defeat setting the club's new records for defeats.

== Players ==
=== Current roster ===
Note: Flags indicate national team eligibility at FIBA-sanctioned events. Players may hold other non-FIBA nationalities not displayed.

Crvena zvezda mts roster
Players
Coaches

Pos.	No.	Nat.	Name	Ht.	Wt.	Age
G/F	7	(Serbia)	Davidovac, Dejan	2.03 m (6 ft 8 in)	95 kg (209 lb)	31 – 17 January 1995
G/F	13	(Serbia)	Dobrić, Ognjen	2.00 m (6 ft 7 in)	93 kg (205 lb)	32 – 27 October 1994
PG	1	(United States)	Hall, Langston	1.93 m (6 ft 4 in)	82 kg (181 lb)	35 – 1 November 1991
PF	21	(Serbia)	Jagodić-Kuridža, Marko	2.05 m (6 ft 9 in)	104 kg (229 lb)	39 – 15 May 1987
C	32	(Serbia)	Kuzmić, Ognjen	2.14 m (7 ft 0 in)	116 kg (256 lb)	36 – 16 May 1990
G/F	10	(Serbia)	Lazić, Branko (C)	1.95 m (6 ft 5 in)	91 kg (201 lb)	37 – 12 January 1989
SG	3	(United States)	Loyd, Jordan	1.93 m (6 ft 4 in)	95 kg (209 lb)	33 – 27 July 1993
C	35	(Cameroon)	Nnoko, Landry	2.08 m (6 ft 10 in)	113 kg (249 lb)	32 – 9 April 1994
SG	12	(Serbia)	Radanov, Aleksa	2.01 m (6 ft 7 in)	95 kg (209 lb)	28 – 1 February 1998
F/C	11	(Australia)	Reath, Duop	2.11 m (6 ft 11 in)	111 kg (245 lb)	30 – 26 June 1996
F	19	(Serbia)	Simonović, Marko	2.03 m (6 ft 8 in)	95 kg (209 lb)	40 – 30 May 1986
SF	5	(Serbia)	Šaranović, Nikola	2.01 m (6 ft 7 in)	86 kg (190 lb)	23 – 20 August 2003
PG	4	(Serbia)	Uskoković, Aleksa	1.90 m (6 ft 3 in)	86 kg (190 lb)	27 – 30 August 1999
G	2	(United States)	Walden, Corey	1.88 m (6 ft 2 in)	86 kg (190 lb)	34 – 5 August 1992

Head coach

- (Montenegro) Dejan Radonjić

Assistant coach(es)

- (Montenegro) Goran Bošković
- (Serbia) Nikola Birač
- (Serbia) Miodrag Dinić
- (Serbia) Saša Kosović

Strength & conditioning coach(es)

- (Serbia) Aleksandar Lukman

Team manager

- (Serbia) Nebojša Ilić

Legend

- (C) Team captain
- Injured

- Roster
- Transactions
Updated: March 12, 2021

=== Players with multiple nationalities ===
- (Serbia) (Croatia) Marko Jagodić-Kuridža
- (Serbia) (Bosnia and Herzegovina) Ognjen Kuzmić
- (Australia) (South Sudan) Duop Reath
- (United States) (Serbia) Corey Walden

=== Depth chart ===
Pos.	Starting 5	Bench 1	Bench 2	Reserves	Juniors
C	Ognjen Kuzmić	Landry Nnoko	Duop Reath
PF	Marko Jagodić-Kuridža	Marko Simonović
SF	Branko Lazić	Dejan Davidovac			Nikola Šaranović
SG	Jordan Loyd	Ognjen Dobrić		Aleksa Radanov
PG	Langston Hall	Corey Walden	Aleksa Uskoković

=== On loan ===
The following players were on loan during the 2020–21 season.

KK Crvena zvezda players out on loan
Nat.	Player	Position	Team	On loan since
(Serbia)	Stefan Lazarević	SG/SF	(Serbia) FMP	December 2017
(Serbia)	Stefan Đorđević	PF	(Serbia) FMP	August 2018
(Serbia)	Filip Čović	PG	(Serbia) FMP	February 2020
(Serbia)	Nikola Jovanović	PF/C	(Bosnia and Herzegovina) Igokea	August 2020
(Serbia)	Lazar Vasić	PG	(Serbia) FMP	August 2020
(Serbia)	Ranko Simović	SF	(Serbia) FMP	August 2020
(Serbia)	Nikola Manojlović	SG/SF	(Serbia) Tamiš	September 2020
(Montenegro)	Filip Anđušić	PF/C	(Serbia) Tamiš	September 2020
(Serbia)	Dušan Ristić	C	(Italy) Germani Basket Brescia (Russia) Avtodor Saratov	July 2020 – January 2021; January 2021
(Serbia)	Arijan Lakić	PG/SG	(Croatia) Vrijednosnice Osijek (Serbia) Borac Čačak	December 2019 – May 2021; May 2021
(Serbia)	Milutin Vujičić	PG	(Serbia) FMP	May 2021

Guard Filip Čović retired from professional basketball in May 2021.

=== Transactions ===
==== Players In ====
No.	Pos.	Nat.	Name	Age	Moving from		Type	Date	Source
–	PF	(Serbia)	Nikola Popović	22	Boston College	(United States)	Graduated	7 June 2020	
3	SG	(United States)	Jordan Loyd	26	Valencia Basket	(Spain)	End of contract	1 July 2020	
2	PG	(United States)	Corey Walden	27	Partizan NIS	(Serbia)	Contract termination	2 July 2020	
1	PG	(United States)	Langston Hall	28	Promitheas Patras	(Greece)	End of contract	9 July 2020	
19	SF	(Serbia)	Marko Simonović	34	Cedevita Olimpija (Note: Simonović was loaned to the Spanish club Unicaja in 2020.)	(Slovenia)	End of contract	13 July 2020	
12	SG	(Serbia)	Aleksa Radanov	22	FMP	(Serbia)	Loan return	29 July 2020	
4	PG	(Serbia)	Aleksa Uskoković	20	FMP	(Serbia)	Contract termination	30 July 2020	
11	F/C	(Australia)	Duop Reath	24	FMP	(Serbia)	Contract termination	1 August 2020	
32	C	(Serbia)	Ognjen Kuzmić	30	FMP	(Serbia)	Loan return	11 August 2020	
33	PF	(United States)	Emanuel Terry	24	Hapoel Jerusalem	(Israel)	Contract termination	17 September 2020	
0	PG	(Montenegro)	Taylor Rochestie	35	Olympiacos	(Greece)	End of contract	7 October 2020	
00	F/C	(United States)	Johnny O'Bryant III	27	Lokomotiv Kuban	(Russia)	Contract termination	19 October 2020	
55	PG	(Spain)	Quino Colom	32	Valencia	(Spain)	Contract termination	16 December 2020	
35	C	(Cameroon)	Landry Nnoko	26	Alba Berlin	(Germany)	End of contract	25 December 2020 (Note: Nnoko signed on 29 June 2020 to be medicaly discharged on 6 September. However, he returns on 25 December.)	

==== Players Out ====
No.	Pos.	Nat.	Name	Age	Moving to		Type	Date	Source
5	SF	(Greece)	Stratos Perperoglou	35	Retired		End of contract	June 2020	
15	F/C	(United States)	James Gist	33	Bayern Munich	(Germany)	Parted ways	June 2020	
50	C	(Nigeria)	Michael Ojo	27	Deceased (Note: Ojo left the club as a free agent due to the end of contract. On 7 August 2020, he died of heart attack.)		End of contract	June 2020	
00	SG	(United States)	Kevin Punter	26	Olimpia Milano	(Italy)	End of contract	18 June 2020	
22	G	(Serbia)	Charles Jenkins	31	Olympiacos	(Greece)	End of contract	6 July 2020	
4	G	(United States)	Lorenzo Brown	29	Fenerbahçe	(Turkey)	End of contract	14 July 2020	
12	G	(United States)	Billy Baron	29	Zenit	(Russia)	End of contract	15 July 2020	
9	SG	(Serbia)	Nemanja Nenadić	26	FMP	(Serbia)	Parted ways (Note: Nenadić was loaned to Mega Bemax in the 2019–20 ABA League season.)	21 July 2020	
14	C	(Serbia)	Dušan Ristić	24	Germani Basket Brescia	(Italy)	Loan (Note: Ristić was loaned to Astana in the 2019–20 Kazakhstan Championship season.)	24 July 2020	
32	F/C	(Serbia)	Nikola Jovanović	26	Igokea	(Bosnia and Herzegovina)	Loan	5 August 2020	
16	PG	(United States)	Kalin Lucas	31	Ironi Nahariya	(Israel)	End of contract	14 August 2020	
91	C	(Serbia)	Vladimir Štimac	32	AS Monaco	(France)	End of contract	22 August 2020	
0	PG	(Montenegro)	Taylor Rochestie	35	Hapoel Haifa	(Israel)	End of contract	9 December 2020	
33	PF	(United States)	Emanuel Terry	24	Agua Caliente Clippers	(United States)	Parted ways	26 December 2020	
–	PF	(Serbia)	Nikola Popović	23	Chemidor Qom	(Iran)	Parted ways (Note: Popović was loaned to FMP in the 2020–21 ABA League season.)	13 January 2021	
14	C	(Serbia)	Dušan Ristić	25	Avtodor Saratov	(Russia)	Loan (Note: Ristić was previously loaned to Germani Basket Brescia.)	27 January 2021	
00	F/C	(United States)	Johnny O'Bryant III	27	Türk Telekom	(Turkey)	Parted ways	21 February 2021	
22	PF	(Serbia)	Boriša Simanić	22	Mega Soccerbet	(Serbia)	Parted ways	12 March 2021	
55	PG	(Spain)	Quino Colom	32	TD Systems Baskonia	(Spain)	Parted ways	7 May 2021	

== Club ==
=== Technical staff ===
On 8 June 2020, head coach Dragan Šakota parted ways with the Zvezda due to health issues ending his second spell as a head coach. Two days later, the club named Saša Obradović as the new head coach. On the same day, the head coach Obradović introduced his coaching staff; assistant coaches Milenko Bogićević and Bogdan Karaičić, as well as conditioning coach Duško Marković. Prior to that, assistant coaches from the previous season Andrija Gavrilović and Milenko Topić, as well as conditioning coach Aleksandar Lukman left the staff. The sports director Žarko Čabarkapa left the club after the 2019–20 season.

On 24 December 2020, head coach Obradović and the Zvezda parted ways by mutual consent. Following the departure of coach Obradović, assistant coaches Bogićević and Karaičić and conditioning coach Marković left also. On 25 December, the Zvezda hired Dejan Radonjić as the new head coach. Following Radonjić's arrival conditioning coach Lukman and assistant coach Nikola Birač were added to the coaching staff. Both coaches returned to the Zvezda. On 30 December, the Zvezda added two more assistant coaches to the staff, Goran Bošković and Miodrag Dinić.

The following is the technical staff of Crvena zvezda for the 2020–21 season.

Position	Staff member
General manager	(Serbia) Filip Sunturlić
Team Manager	(Serbia) Nebojša Ilić
Head coach	(Montenegro) Dejan Radonjić
Assistant Coaches	(Montenegro) Goran Bošković
Assistant Coaches	(Serbia) Miodrag Dinić
Assistant Coaches	(Serbia) Nikola Birač
Assistant Coaches	(Serbia) (Bosnia and Herzegovina) Saša Kosović
Conditioning Coach	(Serbia) Aleksandar Lukman
Physiotherapist	(Serbia) Milorad Ćirić
Physicians	(Serbia) Nebojša Mitrović
Physicians	(Serbia) Boris Gluščević

=== Uniform ===
Crvena zvezda signed a three-year partnership contract with Adidas on 31 July 2020. Crvena zvezda debuted their new Adidas uniforms for the 2019–20 season after unveiling on 6 September 2020, on the EuroLeague Media Day. The third uniform was unveiled on 8 April 2021.

The following is a list of corporate sponsorship patches on a uniform of Crvena zvezda and uniform designs for the 2020–21 season.

- Supplier: Adidas
- Main sponsor: mts
- Back sponsor: Idea (top), Soccerbet (bottom)
- Shorts sponsor: None

Home	Away	Third

== Pre-season and friendlies ==
Crvena zvezda played at the 2020 Gloria Cup Basketball Tournament II in Antalya, Turkey which took place from 8–13 September. Afterward, the 2020 Gomelsky Cup was cancelled due to COVID-19 pandemic. It would have been played in Moscow, Russia from 16 to 19 September.

Win Loss Void

3 September 2020 1	Crvena zvezda mts (Serbia)	86–77	(Serbia) Mega Bemax	Belgrade
18:00 CET	Scoring by quarter: 25–13, 20–19, 26–19, 15–26
	Pts: Loyd 26; Rebs: not available Asts: not available PIR: not available	Boxscore	Pts: Simonović, Petrušev 19; Rebs: Petrušev 7 Asts: Smith 7 PIR: Petrušev 28	Arena: Aleksandar Nikolić Hall; Attendance: BCD; Referees: not available

5 September 2020 2	Crvena zvezda mts (Serbia)	102–84	(Serbia) FMP	Belgrade
15:00 CET	Scoring by quarter: 29–20, 24–17, 23–25, 26–22
	Pts: Loyd 19; Rebs: not available Asts: not available PIR: not available	Boxscore	Pts: Čović 17; Rebs: not available Asts: not available PIR: not available	Arena: Aleksandar Nikolić Hall; Attendance: BCD; Referees: not available

9 September 2020 Gloria Cup 1	Türk Telekom (Turkey)	54–83	(Serbia) Crvena zvezda mts	Antalya
20:30 FET	Scoring by quarter: 14–19, 17–28, 11–16, 12–20
	Pts: Dekker, Korkmaz 11; Rebs: Eric, Baş 5 Asts: Dekker, Korkmaz 3 PIR: Dekker, Eric 10	Boxscore	Pts: Davidovac, Loyd 19; Rebs: Reath 10; Asts: Jagodić-Kuridža 4 PIR: Davidovac 23	Arena: Gloria Sports Arena; Attendance: BCD; Referees: Sreten Radović, Mykola Ambrosov, Kristaps Konstantinovs

11 September 2020 Gloria Cup 2	Pınar Karşıyaka (Turkey)	63–74	(Serbia) Crvena zvezda mts	Antalya
20:30 FET	Scoring by quarter: 18–27, 13–20, 16–20, 16–7
	Pts: Birsen 14; Rebs: Kennedy 6 Asts: Taylor 3 PIR: Birsen 14	Boxscore	Pts: Loyd 17; Rebs: Loyd, Reath 5 Asts: Hall 6 PIR: Hall 18	Arena: Gloria Sports Arena; Attendance: BCD; Referees: Uroš Nikolić, Mykola Ampbrosov, Kristaps Konstantinovs

13 September 2020 Gloria Cup 3	Anadolu Efes (Turkey)	Canceled	(Serbia) Crvena zvezda mts	Antalya
16:00 FET
		Boxscore		Arena: Gloria Sports Arena
Note: Canceled due to the COVID-19 pandemic in Turkey.

17 September 2020 Gomelsky Cup 1	CSKA Moscow (Russia)	Canceled	(Serbia) Crvena zvezda mts	Moscow
				Arena: USH CSKA

18 September 2020 Gomelsky Cup 2	UNICS Kazan or Lokomotiv Kuban (Russia)	Canceled	(Serbia) Crvena zvezda mts	Moscow
				Arena: USH CSKA

16 September 2020 5	Igokea (Bosnia and Herzegovina)	61–72	(Serbia) Crvena zvezda mts	Laktaši
12:00	Scoring by quarter: 25–19, 6–21, 13–17, 18–14
	Pts: Carmichael 13; Rebs: Carmichael 5 Asts: not available PIR: not available	Boxscore	Pts: Walden 15; Rebs: Kuzmić 9 Asts: not available PIR: not available	Arena: Laktaši Sports Hall; Attendance: BCD; Referees: not available

19 September 2020 6	Crvena zvezda mts (Serbia)	89–79	(Montenegro) Mornar	Belgrade
16:00	Scoring by quarter: 28–23, 21–22, 26–21, 14–13
	Pts: Loyd 29; Rebs: Kuzmić, Reath 6 Asts: Hall 7 PIR: not available	Boxscore	Pts: Needham 15; Rebs: not available Asts: not available PIR: not available	Arena: Aleksandar Nikolić Hall; Attendance: BCD; Referees: not available

24 September 2020 7	Crvena zvezda mts (Serbia)	83–53	(Romania) CSM Oradea	Belgrade
18:00	Scoring by quarter: 26–17, 16–4, 23–17, 18–15
	Pts: Loyd 18; Rebs: Jagodić-Kuridža 8 Asts: five players 3 PIR: Loyd, Jagodić-Kuridža 18	Boxscore	Pts: Broussard 17; Rebs: Marković 6 Asts: Broussard, Marković 3 PIR: Marković 15	Arena: Aleksandar Nikolić Hall; Attendance: BCD; Referees: not available

26 September 2020 8	Borac (Serbia)	78–99	(Serbia) Crvena zvezda mts	Čačak
	Scoring by quarter: 21–24, 18–29, 21–26, 18–18
	Pts: Kočović 17; Rebs: not available Asts: not available PIR: not available	Boxscore	Pts: Loyd 26; Rebs: Loyd 8 Asts: Walden 4 PIR: not available	Arena: Borac Hall; Attendance: BCD; Referees: Strahinja Dašić, Đorđe Bogojević, Dimovski

== Competitions ==
=== Overall ===
Competition	Started round	Final position / round	First match	Last match
Adriatic League	Matchday 1	Champions	October 5, 2020	May 28, 2021
EuroLeague	Matchday 1	17th / Matchday 34	October 2, 2020	April 8, 2021
Serbian League	Quarterfinals 1	Champions	May 31, 2021	June 13, 2021
Adriatic Supercup	Never started	Canceled	None	
Radivoj Korać Cup	Quarterfinals	Winner	February 11, 2021	February 14, 2021

Updated to match played June 13, 2021
Source: Competitions

=== Overview ===
Competition	Record							
Competition	Pld	W	D	L	PF	PA	PD	Win %
Adriatic League	26	23	0	3	2,064	1,694	+370	88.46
Adriatic League Playoffs	8	5	0	3	605	568	+37	62.50
Serbian League Playoffs	7	6	0	1	600	471	+129	85.71
EuroLeague	34	10	0	24	2,499	2,684	−185	29.41
Radivoj Korać Cup	3	3	0	0	260	185	+75	100.00
Total	78	47	0	31	6,028	5,602	+426	60.26

Last updated: June 13, 2021
Source: Competitions

=== Adriatic League ===
==== Regular season ====
Pos	Team	Pld	W	L	PF	PA	PD	Pts	Qualification or relegation
1	(Serbia) Crvena zvezda mts	26	23	3	2064	1694	+370	49	Advance to the playoffs
2	(Montenegro) Budućnost VOLI	26	22	4	2056	1811	+245	48	Advance to the playoffs
3	(Montenegro) Mornar	26	19	7	2066	1890	+176	45	Advance to the playoffs
4	(Bosnia and Herzegovina) Igokea	26	19	7	1973	1846	+127	45	Advance to the playoffs
5	(Slovenia) Cedevita Olimpija	26	18	8	2116	1947	+169	44	

Source: ABA League

==== Results summary ====
Overall						Home					Away				
Pld	W	L	PF	PA	PD	W	L	PF	PA	PD	W	L	PF	PA	PD
26	23	3	2064	1694	+370	12	1	1010	826	+184	11	2	1054	868	+186

Last updated: April 27, 2021.
Source: Competitive matches

==== Results by round ====
Round	1	2	3	4	5	6	7	8	9	10	11	12	13	14	15	16	17	18	19	20	21	22	23	24	25	26
Ground	A	A	H	A	H	A	H	A	H	A	H	A	H	H	H	A	H	A	H	A	H	A	H	A	H	A
Result	W	W	W	W	W	W	W	W	L	W	W	L	W	W	W	W	W	W	W	W	W	L	W	W	W	W
Position	1	1	1	1	1	1	1	1	1	1	1	2	2	4	4	6	6	6	5	5	4	3	2	3	3	1

Last updated: April 27, 2021.
Source: Competitive matches
Ground: A = Away; H = Home; R = Rest. Result: L = Loss; W = Win; R = Rest; P = Postponed.

Win Loss

==== Matches ====
Note: All times are local CET (UTC+1) as listed by the ABA League. Some games was played behind closed doors (BCD) due to the COVID-19 pandemic in Europe.

5 October 2020 1	Cibona (Croatia)	66–104	(Serbia) Crvena zvezda mts	Zagreb
18:00	Scoring by quarter: 11–33, 17–31, 15–20, 23–20
	Pts: Drežnjak 16; Rebs: Bundović 4 Asts: Drežnjak 4 PIR: Bundović 17	Boxscore	Pts: Walden 19; Rebs: Reath 6 Asts: Hall 9 PIR: Walden 23	Arena: Dražen Petrović Hall; Attendance: 400; Referees: Saša Pukl, Sašo Petek, Milan Nedović

11 October 2020 2	Borac Čačak (Serbia)	64–95	(Serbia) Crvena zvezda mts	Čačak
17:00	Scoring by quarter: 13–23, 18–23, 21–25, 12–24
	Pts: Jones 16; Rebs: Gavrilović 7 Asts: Kočović, Jones 3 PIR: Jones 17	Boxscore	Pts: Loyd 21; Rebs: Jagodić-Kuridža, Reath 6 Asts: Hall 7 PIR: Loyd 26	Arena: Borac Hall; Attendance: BCD; Referees: Ilija Belošević, Marko Pecelj, Aleksandar Milojević

18 October 2020 3	Crvena zvezda mts (Serbia)	93–62	(Montenegro) Mornar	Belgrade
20:00	Scoring by quarter: 24–23, 22–13, 21–11, 26–15
	Pts: Loyd 16; Rebs: Simonović, Terry 7 Asts: Loyd, Rochestie 7 PIR: Loyd 23	Boxscore	Pts: Pullen 12; Rebs: Needham 6 Asts: Needham 8 PIR: Needham, Pullen 10	Arena: Aleksandar Nikolić Hall; Attendance: BCD; Referees: Sreten Radović, Tomislav Hordov, Tomislav Vovk

25 October 2020 4	Mega Soccerbet (Serbia)	73–76	(Serbia) Crvena zvezda mts	Belgrade
12:00	Scoring by quarter: 18–24, 17–16, 18–15, 20–21
	Pts: Petrušev 22; Rebs: Petrušev 11; Asts: Tepić 8 PIR: Petrušev 24	Boxscore	Pts: Loyd 19; Rebs: Three players 5 Asts: Hall, Loyd 4 PIR: Loyd 22	Arena: Ranko Žeravica Hall; Attendance: 30; Referees: Ilija Belošević, Marko Juras, Krunoslav Peić

2 November 2020 5	Crvena zvezda mts (Serbia)	88–62	(Slovenia) Krka	Belgrade
18:00	Scoring by quarter: 18–15, 26–14, 23–17, 21–16
	Pts: Dobrić 14; Rebs: O'Bryant 6 Asts: Walden 5 PIR: Walden 19	Boxscore	Pts: Vrabac 13; Rebs: Barič 6 Asts: Barič 7 PIR: Vrabac 18	Arena: Aleksandar Nikolić Hall; Attendance: BCD; Referees: Luka Kardum, Ivan Stefanović, Gordan Terlević

8 November 2020 6	Koper Primorska (Slovenia)	0–20	(Serbia) Crvena zvezda mts	Koper
17:00	Scoring by quarter: ~~14–28~~, ~~24–21~~, ~~22–16~~, ~~12–19~~
	Pts: ~~Macura 17~~; Rebs: ~~Macura 17~~; Asts: ~~Vončina 6~~; PIR: ~~Macura 28~~	Boxscore	Pts: ~~Dobrić, Rochestie 16~~; Rebs: ~~Dobrić 6~~; Asts: ~~Hall 7~~; PIR: ~~Walden 21~~	Arena: Arena Bonifika; Referees: Denis Hadžić, Gordan Terlević, Bojan Kruljac
Note: Crvena zvezda mts won 84–72 over Koper Primorska. On 17 December 2020, the result was overturned 20–0 for the Zvezda, following the Koper Primoprska disqualification from the competition. The players statistics were annulled.

15 November 2020 7	Crvena zvezda mts (Serbia)	78–76	(Croatia) Split	Belgrade
19:00	Scoring by quarter: 18–24, 20–18, 22–17, 18–17
	Pts: O'Bryant 18; Rebs: Davidovac 7 Asts: Hall 7 PIR: O'Bryant 18	Boxscore	Pts: Luković 25; Rebs: Vranković 12; Asts: Mesiček 5 PIR: Luković 29	Arena: Aleksandar Nikolić Hall; Attendance: BCD; Referees: Milivoje Jovčić, Matej Špendl, Edo Javor

23 November 2020 8	Partizan NIS (Serbia)	85–86	(Serbia) Crvena zvezda mts	Belgrade
21:00	Scoring by quarter: 19–22, 21–28, 25–24, 20–12
	Pts: Thomas 19; Rebs: Mosley, Thomas 6 Asts: Gordić 6 PIR: Mosley, Thomas 24	Boxscore	Pts: Loyd 18; Rebs: Terry 9 Asts: Hall 5 PIR: Walden 14	Arena: Ranko Žeravica Sports Hall; Attendance: BCD; Referees: Sreten Radović, Matej Boltauzer, Sašo Petek

6 December 2020 9	Crvena zvezda mts (Serbia)	65–67	(Montenegro) Budućnost VOLI	Belgrade
18:00	Scoring by quarter: 20–17, 19–27, 16–12, 10–11
	Pts: Davidovac 13; Rebs: Davidovac 10; Asts: Rochestie 3 PIR: Davidovac 24	Boxscore	Pts: Ivanović 20; Rebs: Ejim, Nikolić 5 Asts: Ivanović 3 PIR: Ivanović 18	Arena: Aleksandar Nikolić Hall; Attendance: BCD; Referees: Saša Pukl, Tomislav Hordov, Josip Radojković

12 December 2020 10	FMP (Serbia)	75–111	(Serbia) Crvena zvezda mts	Belgrade
12:00	Scoring by quarter: 19–30, 19–31, 25–28, 12–22
	Pts: Lazarević 15; Rebs: Nenadić 6 Asts: Čarapić 6 PIR: Čarapić 19	Boxscore	Pts: Dobrić 21; Rebs: Davidovac, Kuzmić 5 Asts: Uskoković 10; PIR: Dobrić 25	Arena: Železnik Hall; Attendance: BCD; Referees: Igor Dragojević, Tomislav Vovk, Ernad Karović

14 April 2021 11	Crvena zvezda mts (Serbia)	82–81	(Slovenia) Cedevita Olimpija	Belgrade
18:00	Scoring by quarter: 24–24, 28–27, 17–14, 13–16
	Pts: Loyd 19; Rebs: Kuzmić 7 Asts: Walden 7 PIR: Loyd, Walden 19	Boxscore	Pts: Perry 19; Rebs: Brown 9 Asts: Blažič, Rupnik 5 PIR: Perry 16	Arena: Aleksandar Nikolić Hall; Attendance: 0 Referees: Uroš Nikolić, Milan Nedović, Dragan Porobić
Note: Originally to be scheduled to 20 December, due to the Crvena zvezda roster quarantine it was postponed and rescheduled to 14 April 2021.

27 December 2020 12	Igokea (Bosnia and Herzegovina)	85–65	(Serbia) Crvena zvezda mts	Laktaši
17:00	Scoring by quarter: 25–16, 25–12, 21–15, 14–22
	Pts: Carmichael 14; Rebs: Pot 5 Asts: Pot 6 PIR: Pot 16	Boxscore	Pts: Dobrić, Walden 10; Rebs: Kuzmić 10; Asts: Uskoković, Walden 4 PIR: Kuzmić 16	Arena: Laktaši Sports Hall; Attendance: BCD; Referees: Matej Boltauzer, Miloš Koljenšić, Mario Majkić

2 January 2021 13	Crvena zvezda mts (Serbia)	81–66	(Croatia) Zadar	Belgrade
17:00	Scoring by quarter: 22–16, 21–12, 25–22, 13–16
	Pts: Dobrić, Walden 12; Rebs: O'Bryant 8 Asts: Colom, Walden 6 PIR: Colom 20	Boxscore	Pts: Bursać 15; Rebs: Onuaku 12; Asts: Justice, Junaković 4 PIR: Onuaku 20	Arena: Aleksandar Nikolić Hall; Attendance: BCD; Referees: Ilija Belošević, Uroš Nikolić, Bojan Kruljac

16 March 2021 14	Crvena zvezda mts (Serbia)	85–63	(Croatia) Cibona	Belgrade
18:00	Scoring by quarter: 21–10, 20–18, 16–12, 28–23
B92	Pts: Loyd 25; Rebs: Jagodić-Kuridža, Radanov 6 Asts: Radanov 6 PIR: Loyd 24	Boxscore	Pts: Prkačin 14; Rebs: Prkačin 10; Asts: three players 3 PIR: Prkačin 15	Arena: Aleksandar Nikolić Hall; Attendance: BCD; Referees: Mario Majkić, Miloš Koljenšić, Radoš Savović
Note: Originally to be scheduled to 10 January 2021, due to the Cibona roster quarantine it was postponed and rescheduled to 16 March.

17 February 2021 15	Crvena zvezda mts (Serbia)	83–63	(Serbia) Borac Čačak	Belgrade
18:05	Scoring by quarter: 23–16, 15–17, 23–14, 22–16
	Pts: Loyd 17; Rebs: Kuzmić 11; Asts: Davidovac 6 PIR: Jagodić-Kuridža 20	Boxscore	Pts: Todorović 13; Rebs: Narandžić 8 Asts: Jones 8 PIR: Narandžić 14	Arena: Aleksandar Nikolić Hall; Attendance: BCD; Referees: Milivoje Jovčić, Uroš Obrknežević, Aleksandar Milojević
Note: Originally to be scheduled to 18 January 2021, due to the EuroLeague game between Real Madrid and Crvena zvezda that was subsequently scheduled for the same date it was postponed and rescheduled to 17 February 2021.

24 January 2021 16	Mornar (Montenegro)	78–86	(Serbia) Crvena zvezda mts	Bar
19:00	Scoring by quarter: 22–25, 15–15, 24–24, 17–22
	Pts: Whitehead 19; Rebs: Needham 6 Asts: Gordić 6 PIR: Whitehead 18	Boxscore	Pts: Dobrić 20; Rebs: Lazić, Nnoko 7 Asts: Walden 4 PIR: Dobrić 20	Arena: Topolica Sport Hall; Attendance: BCD; Referees: Saša Pukl, Sašo Petek, Josip Radojković

1 February 2021 17	Crvena zvezda mts (Serbia)	92–85	(Serbia) Mega Soccerbet	Belgrade
18:00	Scoring by quarter: 28–24, 21–22, 25–20, 18–19
	Pts: Loyd 29; Rebs: Nnoko 9 Asts: Hall 7 PIR: Hall, Loyd 22	Boxscore	Pts: Petrušev 22; Rebs: Simonović, Tepić 10; Asts: Cazalon 5 PIR: Simonović 23	Arena: Aleksandar Nikolić Hall; Attendance: BCD; Referees: Sreten Radović, Luka Kardum, Krunoslav Peić

20 April 2021 18	Krka (Slovenia)	57–98	(Serbia) Crvena zvezda mts	Novo Mesto
18:30	Scoring by quarter: 9–24, 13–31, 19–20, 16–23
	Pts: Stipčević, Vrabac 10; Rebs: Three players 4 Asts: Stergar, Stipčević 3 PIR: Vrabac 17	Boxscore	Pts: Simonović 15; Rebs: Reath 6 Asts: Hall 6 PIR: Simonović 24	Arena: Leon Štukelj Hall; Attendance: 0 Referees: Ilija Belošević, Milivoje Jovčić, Tomislav Vovk
Note: Originally to be scheduled to 7 February 2021, due to a large number of confirmed positive COVID-19 cases in Crvena zvezda mts team it was postponed, and rescheduled to 20 April 2021.

February 2021 19	Crvena zvezda mts (Serbia)	20–0	(Slovenia) Koper Primorska	Belgrade
		Boxscore		Arena: Aleksandar Nikolić Hall
Note: The game was not played due to the Koper Primoprska disqualification from the competition in December 2020.

8 March 2021 20	Split (Croatia)	60–71	(Serbia) Crvena zvezda mts	Split
21:00	Scoring by quarter: 17–18, 15–15, 17–21, 11–17
	Pts: Luković, Kedžo 12; Rebs: Luković, Marić 9 Asts: Ukić 6 PIR: Ukić 17	Boxscore	Pts: Walden 24; Rebs: Dobrić, Davidovac 9 Asts: Loyd 6 PIR: Dobrić 24	Arena: Arena Gripe; Attendance: 1 Referees: Damir Javor, Mario Majkić, Edo Javor

14 March 2021 21	Crvena zvezda mts (Serbia)	73–64	(Serbia) Partizan NIS	Belgrade
19:30	Scoring by quarter: 15–14, 26–20, 16–16, 16–14
	Pts: Reath 15; Rebs: Reath 7 Asts: Loyd 6 PIR: Loyd 18	Boxscore	Pts: Thomas 17; Rebs: Thomas 14; Asts: Janković 4 PIR: Thomas 26	Arena: Aleksandar Nikolić Hall; Attendance: 0 Referees: Saša Pukl, Igor Dragojević, Sašo Petek

21 March 2021 22	Budućnost VOLI (Montenegro)	83–63	(Serbia) Crvena zvezda mts	Podgorica
20:00	Scoring by quarter: 24–12, 19–20, 24–14, 16–17
	Pts: Ejim 18; Rebs: Ejim 6 Asts: Cobbs 6 PIR: Cobbs 22	Boxscore	Pts: Walden 17; Rebs: Four players 3 Asts: Walden 4 PIR: Walden 16	Arena: Morača Sports Center; Attendance: 0 Referees: Sreten Radović, Matej Boltauzer, Milan Nedović

27 March 2021 23	Crvena zvezda mts (Serbia)	101–71	(Serbia) FMP	Belgrade
19:00	Scoring by quarter: 35–27, 28–20, 17–4, 21–20
	Pts: Loyd 18; Rebs: Dobrić 7 Asts: Davidovac, Uskoković 6 PIR: Davidovac 22	Boxscore	Pts: Nenadić 20; Rebs: Đorđević 5 Asts: Nenadić 3 PIR: Nenadić 20	Arena: Aleksandar Nikolić Hall; Attendance: 0 Referees: Dragan Porobić, Ivan Stefanović, Aleksandar Milojević

18 April 2021 24	Cedevita Olimpija (Slovenia)	72–89	(Serbia) Crvena zvezda mts	Ljubljana
17:00	Scoring by quarter: 23–20, 9–24, 24–19, 16–26
	Pts: Perry 29; Rebs: Jones 6 Asts: Brown 4 PIR: Perry 28	Boxscore	Pts: Dobrić 26; Rebs: Loyd, Nnoko 5 Asts: Loyd 4 PIR: Dobrić, Loyd 27	Arena: Arena Stožice; Attendance: 0 Referees: Tomislav Hordov, Josip Radojković, Gordan Terlević
Note: Originally to be scheduled to 4 April 2021, due to a large number of confirmed positive COVID-19 cases in Crvena zvezda mts team it was postponed, and rescheduled to 18 April 2021.

11 April 2021 25	Crvena zvezda mts (Serbia)	69–66	(Bosnia and Herzegovina) Igokea	Belgrade
17:00	Scoring by quarter: 19–22, 11–20, 13–7, 26–17
	Pts: Loyd 18; Rebs: Nnoko 11; Asts: Dobrić 3 PIR: Loyd 20	Boxscore	Pts: Clemmons 16; Rebs: Jošilo 8 Asts: Clemmons 4 PIR: Clemmons 13	Arena: Aleksandar Nikolić Hall; Attendance: 0 Referees: Igor Dragojević, Miloš Koljenšić, Denis Hadžić

27 April 2021 26	Zadar (Croatia)	70–90	(Serbia) Crvena zvezda mts	Zadar
16:00	Scoring by quarter: 18–36, 17–18, 16–14, 19–22
	Pts: Carter 13; Rebs: five players 3 Asts: Junaković 4 PIR: Carter 16	Boxscore	Pts: Walden, Loyd 16; Rebs: Nnoko 9 Asts: Walden 6 PIR: Walden 22	Arena: Jazine Basketball Hall; Attendance: 1 Referees: Igor Dragojević, Miloš Koljenšić, Radoš Savović

==== Playoffs ====
3 May 2021 Semifinals 1	Crvena zvezda mts (Serbia)	76–61 (Series: 1–0)	(Bosnia and Herzegovina) Igokea	Belgrade
18:30	Scoring by quarter: 20–20, 19–22, 17–13, 20–6
	Pts: Loyd 21; Rebs: Dobrić, Nnoko 9 Asts: three players 3 PIR: Walden 20	Boxscore	Pts: Atić 15; Rebs: Jovanović 5 Asts: Carmichael 5 PIR: Atić 16	Arena: Aleksandar Nikolić Hall; Attendance: 0 Referees: Saša Pukl, Miloš Koljenšić, Mario Majkić

7 May 2021 Semifinals 2	Igokea (Bosnia and Herzegovina)	81–68 (Series: 1–1)	(Serbia) Crvena zvezda mts	Laktaši
18:30	Scoring by quarter: 23–13, 22–18, 20–17, 16–20
	Pts: Clemmons 18; Rebs: Ilić 6 Asts: four players 2 PIR: Clemmons, Pot 19	Boxscore	Pts: Dobrić 17; Rebs: Nnoko 8 Asts: Walden 6 PIR: Davidovac 15	Arena: Laktaši Sports Hall; Attendance: 0 Referees: Sreten Radović, Tomislav Hordov, Igor Dragojević

11 May 2021 Semifinals 3	Crvena zvezda mts (Serbia)	76–53 (Series: 2–1)	(Bosnia and Herzegovina) Igokea	Belgrade
18:30	Scoring by quarter: 24–12, 24–23, 9–16, 19–2
Arena Sport	Pts: Davidovac 22; Rebs: Davidovac 8 Asts: Loyd 5 PIR: Davidovac 33	Boxscore	Pts: Clemmons 15; Rebs: Jošilo 6 Asts: Atić 4 PIR: Clemmons 19	Arena: Aleksandar Nikolić Hall; Attendance: 383; Referees: Ilija Belošević, Matej Boltauzer, Sašo Petek

16 May 2021 Finals 1	Crvena zvezda mts (Serbia)	82–78 (Series: 1–0)	(Montenegro) Budućnost VOLI	Belgrade
18:30	Scoring by quarter: 20–20, 24–18, 19–17, 19–23
	Pts: Dobrić, Loyd 23; Rebs: Kuzmić 11; Asts: Hall 7 PIR: Loyd 23	Boxscore	Pts: Reed 26; Rebs: Reed 10; Asts: Ivanović 10; PIR: Reed 35	Arena: Aleksandar Nikolić Hall; Attendance: 987; Referees: Saša Pukl, Tomislav Hordov, Josip Radojković

18 May 2021 Finals 2	Crvena zvezda mts (Serbia)	85–79 (Series: 2–0)	(Montenegro) Budućnost VOLI	Belgrade
20:30	Scoring by quarter: 30–17, 25–24, 8–29, 22–9
	Pts: Dobrić 27; Rebs: Nnoko 7 Asts: Loyd 6 PIR: Dobrić 27	Boxscore	Pts: D. Nikolić 26; Rebs: Reed 11; Asts: Ivanović 5 PIR: D. Nikolić 30	Arena: Aleksandar Nikolić Hall; Attendance: 1,375; Referees: Ilija Belošević, Miloš Koljenšić, Milan Nedović

22 May 2021 Finals 3	Budućnost VOLI (Montenegro)	75–71 (Series: 1–2)	(Serbia) Crvena zvezda mts	Podgorica
20:30	Scoring by quarter: 15–19, 20–13, 16–15, 24–24
	Pts: Della Valle 19; Rebs: D. Nikolić 8 Asts: Ivanović 6 PIR: Ivanović 19	Boxscore	Pts: Loyd 19; Rebs: Nnoko 11; Asts: Loyd 7 PIR: Nnoko 20	Arena: Morača Sports Center; Attendance: 0 Referees: Sreten Radović, Matej Boltauzer, Damir Javor

24 May 2021 Finals 4	Budućnost VOLI (Montenegro)	81–80 (Series: 2–2)	(Serbia) Crvena zvezda mts	Podgorica
20:30	Scoring by quarter: 19–23, 20–19, 19–21, 23 –17
	Pts: Cobbs 22; Rebs: D. Nikolić 9 Asts: Cobbs 7 PIR: Cobbs 29	Boxscore	Pts: Loyd 23; Rebs: Loyd 7 Asts: Dobrić 6 PIR: Dobrić 17	Arena: Morača Sports Center; Attendance: 0 Referees: Saša Pukl, Uroš Nikolić, Sašo Petek

28 May 2021 Finals 5	Crvena zvezda mts (Serbia)	67–60 (Series: 3–2)	(Montenegro) Budućnost VOLI	Belgrade
	Scoring by quarter: 15–14, 18–14, 20–21, 14–11
	Pts: Nnoko 17; Rebs: Nnoko 12; Asts: Dobrić, Loyd 4 PIR: Nnoko 28	Boxscore	Pts: Cobbs 21; Rebs: Mitrović 9 Asts: Ivanović 8 PIR: Cobbs 26	Arena: Aleksandar Nikolić Hall; Attendance: 4,235; Referees: Tomislav Hordov, Josip Radojković, Milan Nedović

=== EuroLeague ===
==== Regular season ====
Pos	Team	Pld	W	L	PF	PA	PD
14	(France) LDLC ASVEL	34	13	21	2590	2714	−124
15	(Germany) ALBA Berlin	34	12	22	2652	2790	−138
16	(Greece) Panathinaikos OPAP	34	11	23	2656	2782	−126
17	(Serbia) Crvena zvezda mts	34	10	24	2499	2684	−185
18	(Russia) Khimki	34	4	30	2616	3050	−434

Source: EuroLeague
Rules for classification: All points scored in extra period(s) will not be counted in the standings, nor for any tie-break situation.

==== Results summary ====
Overall						Home					Away				
Pld	W	L	PF	PA	PD	W	L	PF	PA	PD	W	L	PF	PA	PD
34	10	24	2499	2684	−185	6	11	1268	1288	−20	4	13	1231	1396	−165

Last updated: April 8, 2021.
Source: Competitive matches

==== Results by round ====
Round	1	2	3	4	5	6	7	8	9	10	11	12	13	14	15	16	17	18	19	20	21	22	23	24	25	26	27	28	29	30	31	32	33	34
Ground	A	H	H	A	H	A	A	H	A	A	H	A	H	H	H	A	H	H	A	A	H	A	H	A	H	A	H	A	H	A	A	H	H	A
Result	L	W	L	W	W	L	L	L	W	L	L	L	L	L	W	L	W	L	W	L	L	L	L	L	L	L	L	L	W	W	L	L	W	L
Position	18	9	14	11	10	13	14	13	9	12	12	16	16	17	16	17	15	15	16	14	16	17	17	17	17	17	17	17	17	17	17	17	17	17

Last updated: April 9, 2021.
Source: Competitive matches
Ground: A = Away; H = Home; R = Rest. Result: L = Loss; W = Win; R = Rest; P = Postponed.

Win Loss

==== Matches ====
Note: All times are CET (UTC+1) as listed by EuroLeague. Some games was played behind closed doors (BCD) due to the COVID-19 pandemic in Europe.

2 October 2020 1	Fenerbahçe Beko (Turkey)	77–63	(Serbia) Crvena zvezda mts	Istanbul
19:45	Scoring by quarter: 24–20, 18–10, 15–11, 20–22
	Pts: Brown 17; Rebs: Veselý 8 Asts: De Colo 7 PIR: De Colo 16	Boxscore	Pts: Loyd 15; Rebs: Kuzmić 7 Asts: Loyd 4 PIR: Kuzmić 12	Arena: Ülker Sports and Event Hall; Attendance: BCD; Referees: Luigi Lamonica, Olegs Latisevs, Milan Nedović

9 October 2020 2	Crvena zvezda mts (Serbia)	90–73	(Spain) TD Systems Baskonia	Belgrade
19:00	Scoring by quarter: 23–16, 13–15, 29–18, 25–24
	Pts: Loyd 30; Rebs: Kuzmić 8 Asts: Hall 11; PIR: Loyd 34	Boxscore	Pts: Giedraitis 26; Rebs: Jekiri 5 Asts: Henry 10; PIR: Henry 19	Arena: Aleksandar Nikolić Hall; Attendance: BCD; Referees: Christos Christodoulou, Mehdi Difallah, Kristaps Konstantinovs

13 October 2020 3	Crvena zvezda mts (Serbia)	69–75	(Lithuania) Žalgiris	Belgrade
19:00	Scoring by quarter: 19–19, 14–20, 27–23, 9–13
	Pts: Loyd 19; Rebs: Kuzmić 6 Asts: Four players 3 PIR: Loyd 16	Boxscore	Pts: Lekavičius 16; Rebs: Lauvergne 8 Asts: Jokubaitis 5 PIR: Lekavičius 20	Arena: Aleksandar Nikolić Hall; Attendance: BCD; Referees: Anne Panther, Carlos Cortes, Spiros Gkontas

11 November 2020 4	LDLC ASVEL (France)	68–89	(Serbia) Crvena zvezda mts	Villeurbanne
20:45	Scoring by quarter: 21–17, 17–27, 15–23, 15–22
	Pts: Freeman 14; Rebs: Fall 7 Asts: Diot 6 PIR: Fall 17	Boxscore	Pts: Loyd 29; Rebs: Terry 7 Asts: Walden 5 PIR: Walden 32	Arena: Astroballe; Attendance: BCD; Referees: Juan Carlos García, Marcin Kowalski, Sebastien Clivaz
Note: Originally to be scheduled to 15 October, due to the ASVEL roster quarantine, it was moved to 11 November.

22 October 2020 5	Crvena zvezda mts (Serbia)	86–84(OT)	(Russia) CSKA Moscow	Belgrade
20:45	Scoring by quarter: 18–20, 17–23, 11–8, 27–22, Overtime: 13–11
	Pts: Loyd 31; Rebs: Loyd, Jagodić-Kuridža 6 Asts: Hall 6 PIR: Loyd 25	Boxscore	Pts: Hackett 29; Rebs: Hackett, Voigtmann 5 Asts: James 8 PIR: Hackett 39	Arena: Aleksandar Nikolić Hall; Attendance: BCD; Referees: Luigi Lamonica, Juan Carlos García, Artūras Šukys

30 October 2020 6	Khimki (Russia)	83–77	(Serbia) Crvena zvezda mts	Khimki
18:00	Scoring by quarter: 19–22, 25–18, 14–17, 25–20
	Pts: McCollum 23; Rebs: Mickey 11; Asts: Shved 12; PIR: McCollum 25	Boxscore	Pts: Loyd 18; Rebs: Loyd 7 Asts: three players 3 PIR: Loyd 21	Arena: Mytishchi Arena; Attendance: BCD; Referees: Sreten Radović, Piotr Pastusiak, Robert Vyklicky

6 November 2020 7	Bayern Munich (Germany)	74–59	(Serbia) Crvena zvezda mts	Munich
20:30	Scoring by quarter: 18–14, 15–17, 22–20, 19–8
	Pts: Weiler–Babb, Baldwin IV 15; Rebs: Reynolds 11; Asts: Sisko 5 PIR: Lučić 17	Boxscore	Pts: O'Bryant 17; Rebs: Terry 6 Asts: Loyd 3 PIR: Walden 16	Arena: Audi Dome; Attendance: BCD; Referees: Petri Mantyla, Emilio Perez, Tomasz Trawicki

13 November 2020 8	Crvena zvezda mts (Serbia)	67–73	(Spain) Real Madrid	Belgrade
19:00	Scoring by quarter: 26–21, 16–15, 11–23, 14–14
	Pts: Loyd 22; Rebs: O'Bryant 8 Asts: three players 3 PIR: Loyd 20	Boxscore	Pts: Thompkins 14; Rebs: three players 6 Asts: Abalde 6 PIR: Randolph 16	Arena: Aleksandar Nikolić Hall; Attendance: BCD; Referees: Christos Christodoulou, Emin Moğulkoç, Amit Balak

18 November 2020 9	A|X Armani Exchange Milan (Italy)	79–87	(Serbia) Crvena zvezda mts	Milan
20:45	Scoring by quarter: 23–18, 21–30, 16–18, 19–21
	Pts: Micov 13; Rebs: three players 3 Asts: Rodríguez 5 PIR: Micov 14	Boxscore	Pts: Loyd 17; Rebs: Terry 7 Asts: Loyd 5 PIR: Loyd 24	Arena: Mediolanum Forum; Attendance: BCD; Referees: Matej Boltauzer, Joseph Bissang, Petri Mäntylä

20 November 2020 10	Barcelona (Spain)	76–65	(Serbia) Crvena zvezda mts	Barcelona
21:00	Scoring by quarter: 19–6, 20–16, 22–22, 15–21
	Pts: Mirotić 23; Rebs: Oriola 5 Asts: Calathes 8 PIR: Mirotić 31	Boxscore	Pts: Davidovac 12; Rebs: Terry 6 Asts: Rochestie 5 PIR: Terry 13	Arena: Palau Blaugrana; Attendance: BCD; Referees: Luigi Lamonica, Anne Panther, Vilius Gytis

26 November 2020 11	Crvena zvezda mts (Serbia)	64–75	(Turkey) Anadolu Efes	Belgrade
19:00	Scoring by quarter: 14–16, 22–24, 14–27, 14–8
	Pts: Walden 14; Rebs: Kuzmić 8 Asts: Loyd 4 PIR: Kuzmić, Walden 14	Boxscore	Pts: Larkin 18; Rebs: Moerman 9 Asts: Larkin 5 PIR: Moerman 27	Arena: Aleksandar Nikolić Hall; Attendance: BCD; Referees: Migual Angel Perez, Spiros Gkontas, Amit Balak

3 December 2020 12	Maccabi Tel Aviv (Israel)	81–76	(Serbia) Crvena zvezda mts	Tel Aviv
	Scoring by quarter: 23–20, 18–18, 15–17, 25–21
	Pts: Wilbekin 23; Rebs: Hunter 10; Asts: Jones 5 PIR: Wilbekin 26	Boxscore	Pts: Loyd 24; Rebs: O'Bryant 8 Asts: Loyd 5 PIR: Loyd 25	Arena: Menora Mivtachim Arena; Attendance: BCD; Referees: Daniel Hierrezuelo, Fernando Rocha, Artem Lavrukhin

10 December 2020 13	Crvena zvezda mts (Serbia)	79–81	(Greece) Olympiacos	Belgrade
19:00	Scoring by quarter: 30–16, 15–21, 16–25, 18–19
	Pts: O'Bryant 16; Rebs: four players 4 Asts: Loyd 5 PIR: Loyd 16	Boxscore	Pts: Printezis 16; Rebs: Martin 6 Asts: Sloukas 7 PIR: Printezis 18	Arena: Aleksandar Nikolić Hall; Attendance: BCD; Referees: Damir Javor, Carmelo Paternicò, Jordi Aliaga

15 December 2020 14	Crvena zvezda mts (Serbia)	84–90(OT)	(Germany) ALBA Berlin	Belgrade
19:00	Scoring by quarter: 16–15, 21–19, 20–14, 19–28, Overtime: 8–14
	Pts: Loyd 21; Rebs: O'Bryant 9 Asts: Walden 5 PIR: Loyd 17	Boxscore	Pts: Lô 21; Rebs: Olinde 7 Asts: Lô, Siva 6 PIR: Siva 26	Arena: Aleksandar Nikolić Hall; Attendance: BCD; Referees: Borys Ryzhyk, Carlos Peruga, Artūras Šukys

18 December 2020 15	Crvena zvezda mts (Serbia)	76–73	(Spain) Valencia Basket	Belgrade
19:00	Scoring by quarter: 20–22, 25–14, 12–21, 19–16
	Pts: Loyd 20; Rebs: Davidovac, Kuzmić 5 Asts: Loyd 6 PIR: Loyd, O'Bryant 18	Boxscore	Pts: Labeyrie, Prepelič 15; Rebs: Labeyrie 6 Asts: Hermannsson 5 PIR: Labeyrie 23	Arena: Aleksandar Nikolić Hall; Attendance: BCD; Referees: Luigi Lamonica, Marcin Kowalski, Amit Balak

22 December 2020 16	Zenit Saint Petersburg (Russia)	98–69	(Serbia) Crvena zvezda mts	Saint Petersburg
18:00	Scoring by quarter: 30–12, 18–25, 21–17, 29–15
	Pts: Rivers 23; Rebs: Thomas, Rivers 4 Asts: Ponitka 6 PIR: Rivers 26	Boxscore	Pts: O'Bryant 13; Rebs: Simonović, O'Bryant 3 Asts: Three players 2 PIR: O'Bryant 12	Arena: Sibur Arena; Attendance: BCD; Referees: Sreten Radovic, Emin Mogulkoc, Jordi Aliaga

30 December 2020 17	Crvena zvezda mts (Serbia)	74–71	(Greece) Panathinaikos OPAP	Belgrade
19:00	Scoring by quarter: 22–15, 26–22, 9–9, 17–25
	Pts: Walden 17; Rebs: Kuzmić 7 Asts: Walden 5 PIR: Walden 15	Boxscore	Pts: Papapetrou 20; Rebs: Papagiannis, Kaselakis 5 Asts: Mack 5 PIR: Papapetrou 15	Arena: Aleksandar Nikolić Hall; Attendance: BCD; Referees: Miguel Ángel Pérez, Carmelo Paternicò, Seffi Shemmesh

7 January 2021 18	Crvena zvezda mts (Serbia)	71–73	(Turkey) Fenerbahçe Beko	Belgrade
19:00	Scoring by quarter: 22–18, 17–20, 14–15, 18–20
	Pts: O'Bryant 17; Rebs: O'Bryant 10; Asts: Colom 5 PIR: O'Bryant 30	Boxscore	Pts: Brown, Pierre 13; Rebs: Gudurić 8 Asts: Brown 4 PIR: Pierre 19	Arena: Aleksandar Nikolić Hall; Attendance: BCD; Referees: Christos Christodoulou, Fernando Rocha, Robert Vyklicky

18 January 2021 19	Real Madrid (Spain)	77–79	(Serbia) Crvena zvezda mts	Madrid
19:00	Scoring by quarter: 21–23, 19–22, 18–21, 19–13
	Pts: Fernández 11; Rebs: Tavares 9 Asts: Laprovíttola 10; PIR: Laprovíttola 18	Boxscore	Pts: Walden 18; Rebs: Kuzmić 9 Asts: Dobrić 3 PIR: Dobrić 21	Arena: WiZink Center; Attendance: BCD; Referees: Christos Christodoulou, Gytis Vilius, Hugues Thepenier
Note: Originally to be scheduled to 13 January it was postponed due to the inability of Crvena Zvezda squad to reach the Spanish capital because of the exceptional bad weather conditions and rescheduled to 18 January.

15 January 2021 20	Valencia Basket (Spain)	91–71	(Serbia) Crvena zvezda mts	Valencia
21:00	Scoring by quarter: 27–15, 22–27, 19–15, 23–14
	Pts: Labeyrie 16; Rebs: Tobey 5 Asts: Kalinić 7 PIR: Van Rossom 21	Boxscore	Pts: O'Bryant 21; Rebs: Jagodić-Kuridža 6 Asts: Hall 4 PIR: Jagodić-Kuridža 14	Arena: La Fonteta; Attendance: BCD; Referees: Borys Ryzhyk, Elias Koromilas, Aare Halliko

22 January 2021 21	Crvena zvezda mts (Serbia)	60–72	(Spain) Barcelona	Belgrade
19:00	Scoring by quarter: 11–21, 20–14, 14–22, 15–15
	Pts: Dobrić 11; Rebs: O'Bryant 8 Asts: Colom 4 PIR: Walden, Davidovac 11	Boxscore	Pts: Higgins 14; Rebs: Mirotić 8 Asts: Calathes 5 PIR: Oriola, Calathes 17	Arena: Aleksandar Nikolić Hall; Attendance: BCD; Referees: Robert Lottermoser, Marcin Kowalski, Michele Rossi

26 January 2021 22	Anadolu Efes (Turkey)	86–72	(Serbia) Crvena zvezda mts	Istanbul
17:00	Scoring by quarter: 29–13, 27–22, 19–17, 11–20
	Pts: Larkin 23; Rebs: Moerman 10; Asts: Simon 6 PIR: Larkin 24	Boxscore	Pts: Davidovac, Dobrić 12; Rebs: Reath 6 Asts: Colom 5 PIR: Davidovac 17	Arena: Sinan Erdem Dome; Attendance: BCD; Referees: Juan Carlos Garcia, Jakub Zamojski, Artem Lavrukhin

29 January 2021 23	Crvena zvezda mts (Serbia)	78–81	(France) LDLC ASVEL	Belgrade
20:45	Scoring by quarter: 23–25, 15–20, 18–12, 22–24
	Pts: Walden, Dobrić 17; Rebs: Kuzmić 7 Asts: Walden, Loyd 3 PIR: Walden 22	Boxscore	Pts: Cole 22; Rebs: M.Fall 5 Asts: Lacombe 6 PIR: Cole 25	Arena: Aleksandar Nikolić Hall; Attendance: BCD; Referees: Daniel Hierrezuelo, Fernando Rocha, Kristaps Konstantinovs

23 February 2021 24	Žalgiris (Lithuania)	75–62	(Serbia) Crvena zvezda mts	Kaunas
19:00	Scoring by quarter: 22–26, 18–18, 20–14, 15–4
	Pts: Grigonis 17; Rebs: Rubit 8 Asts: Walkup 7 PIR: Grigonis 24	Boxscore	Pts: Loyd, Simonović 16; Rebs: Dobrić, Kuzmić 5 Asts: Davidovac 5 PIR: Loyd 17	Arena: Žalgiris Arena; Attendance: BCD; Referees: Mehdi Difallah, Emilio Pérez, Rain Peerandi
Note: Originally to be scheduled to 4 February, due to the Crvena zvezda roster quarantine it was postponed and rescheduled to 23 February 2021.

19 February 2021 25	Crvena zvezda mts (Serbia)	75–76	(Russia) Zenit Saint Petersburg	Belgrade
20:45	Scoring by quarter: 16–22, 20–26, 20–13, 19–15
	Pts: Loyd 21; Rebs: Kuzmić 9 Asts: Uskoković 6 PIR: Loyd 20	Boxscore	Pts: Pangos 25; Rebs: Gudaitis 6 Asts: Pangos 7 PIR: Pangos 25	Arena: Aleksandar Nikolić Hall; Attendance: BCD; Referees: Christos Christodoulou, Robert Vyklicky, Saulius Racyst

26 February 2021 26	TD Systems Baskonia (Spain)	87–67	(Serbia) Crvena zvezda mts	Vitoria-Gasteiz
19:00	Scoring by quarter: 21–16, 27–11, 18–21, 21–19
	Pts: Y. Fall 20; Rebs: Polonara 8 Asts: Henry 6 PIR: Y. Fall 23	Boxscore	Pts: Loyd 14; Rebs: Kuzmić 7 Asts: Loyd, Uskoković 3 PIR: Walden 14	Arena: Buesa Arena; Attendance: BCD; Referees: Borys Ryzhyk, Carmelo Paternicò, Hugues Thépénier

2 March 2021 27	Crvena zvezda mts (Serbia)	76–78	(Germany) Bayern Munich	Belgrade
20:45	Scoring by quarter: 10–16, 25–16, 22–19, 19–28
	Pts: Loyd 26; Rebs: Dobrić, Loyd 6 Asts: Uskoković 3 PIR: Loyd 24	Boxscore	Pts: Baldwin 27; Rebs: Lučić, Johnson 4 Asts: Seeley 4 PIR: Baldwin 23	Arena: Aleksandar Nikolić Hall; Attendance: BCD; Referees: Juan Carlos Garcia, Arturas Sukys, Sergio Silva

5 March 2021 28	Olympiacos (Greece)	94–79	(Serbia) Crvena zvezda mts	Piraeus
20:00	Scoring by quarter: 30–19, 23–29, 22–19, 19–12
	Pts: McKissic 20; Rebs: Ellis 7 Asts: Sloukas, Spanoulis 7 PIR: Vezenkov 26	Boxscore	Pts: Simonović 19; Rebs: Lazić 5 Asts: Hall 7 PIR: Simonović 14	Arena: Peace and Friendship Stadium; Attendance: BCD; Referees: Daniel Hierrezuelo, Jakub Zamojski, Sinan Isguder

11 March 2021 29	Crvena zvezda mts (Serbia)	92–81	(Russia) Khimki	Belgrade
20:45	Scoring by quarter: 8–15, 26–23, 28–22, 30–21
	Pts: Loyd 22; Rebs: Loyd 4 Asts: Loyd 6 PIR: Loyd 27	Boxscore	Pts: McCollum 29; Rebs: McCollum, Mickey 7 Asts: McCollum 6 PIR: McCollum 33	Arena: Aleksandar Nikolić Hall; Attendance: BCD; Referees: Anne Panther, Emilio Perez, Robert Vyklicky

19 March 2021 30	Panathinaikos OPAP (Greece)	82–86	(Serbia) Crvena zvezda mts	Athens
20:00	Scoring by quarter: 23–17, 17–23, 19–20, 23–26
	Pts: Sant-Roos 21; Rebs: Papagiannis 8 Asts: Sant-Roos, Papapetrou 4 PIR: Sant-Roos 26	Boxscore	Pts: Loyd 27; Rebs: Simonović, Kuzmić 5 Asts: Loyd 5 PIR: Loyd 30	Arena: OACA Altion; Attendance: BCD; Referees: Borys Ryzhyk, Michele Rossi, Jordi Aliaga

25 March 2021 31	CSKA Moscow (Russia)	87–72	(Serbia) Crvena zvezda mts	Moscow
18:00	Scoring by quarter: 31–19, 19–20, 21–20, 16–13
	Pts: Shengelia 16; Rebs: Eric 8 Asts: James 4 PIR: Hackett 24	Boxscore	Pts: Davidovac 20; Rebs: Nnoko 10; Asts: Walden, Davidovac 3 PIR: Davidovac 21	Arena: Megasport Sport Palace; Attendance: 4402; Referees: Fernando Rocha, Elias Koromilas, Michele Rossi

30 March 2021 32	Crvena zvezda mts (Serbia)	72–93	(Italy) AX Armani Exchange Milan	Belgrade
19:00	Scoring by quarter: 12–22, 24–25, 15–28, 21–18
	Pts: Loyd 22; Rebs: Davidovac 6 Asts: Loyd 3 PIR: Loyd 23	Boxscore	Pts: Punter 23; Rebs: LeDay 5 Asts: Rodríguez 8 PIR: Punter 23	Arena: Aleksandar Nikolić Hall; Attendance: 0 Referees: Robert Lottermoser, Juan Carlos Garcia, Artem Lavrukhin

1 April 2021 33	Crvena zvezda mts (Serbia)	76–64	(Israel) Maccabi Tel Aviv	Belgrade
20:45	Scoring by quarter: 15–21, 18–13, 20–11, 23–19
	Pts: Loyd 21; Rebs: Simonović, Nnoko 11; Asts: Loyd 4 PIR: Loyd 23	Boxscore	Pts: Dorsey 14; Rebs: Žižić 6 Asts: Jones 5 PIR: Dorsey 16	Arena: Aleksandar Nikolić Hall; Attendance: 0 Referees: Miguel Angel Perez, Gytis Vilius, Marcin Kowalski

8 April 2021 34	ALBA Berlin (Germany)	81–58	(Serbia) Crvena zvezda mts	Berlin
20:00	Scoring by quarter: 24–22, 25–8, 17–16, 15–12
	Pts: Siva 18; Rebs: Fontecchio 6 Asts: Siva, Granger 8 PIR: Siva 21	Boxscore	Pts: Simonović 12; Rebs: Nnoko 11; Asts: Uskoković, Lazić 3 PIR: Kuzmić, Nnoko 12	Arena: Mercedes-Benz Arena; Attendance: 0 Referees: Borys Ryzhyk, Emilio Perez, Mehdi Difallah,

=== Serbian League ===
The 2020–21 Basketball League of Serbia is the 15th season of the Serbian highest professional basketball league. The Zvezda is the defending champions.

==== Playoffs ====
Note: All times are local CET (UTC+1) as listed by the Basketball League of Serbia. Some games will be played behind closed doors (BCD) due to the COVID-19 pandemic in Serbia.

31 May 2021 Quarterfinals 1	Crvena zvezda mts	74–56 (Series: 1–0)	Zlatibor	Belgrade
18:00	Scoring by quarter: 29–12, 14–16, 19–14, 12–14
	Pts: Radanov 12; Rebs: Davidovac 8 Asts: Uskoković 6 PIR: Davidovac 16	Boxscore	Pts: Protić 11; Rebs: Miljanić 8 Asts: three players 3 PIR: Miljanić 11	Arena: Aleksandar Nikolić Hall; Attendance: 0 Referees: Aleksandar Glišić, Marko Pecelj, Duško Sedlar

1 June 2021 Quarterfinals 2	Zlatibor	68–91 (Series: 0–2)	Crvena zvezda mts	Čajetina
18:00	Scoring by quarter: 13–21, 19–26, 19–18, 17–26
	Pts: Kutlešić 14; Rebs: Riznić 7 Asts: Miljanić 5 PIR: Riznić 14	Boxscore	Pts: Dobrić 21; Rebs: Three players 5 Asts: Uskoković 4 PIR: Dobrić 22	Arena: Čajetina Sport Center; Attendance: 0 Referees: Ilija Belošević, Aleksandar Milojević, Dragan Matić

4 June 2021 Semifinals 1	Crvena zvezda mts	101–70 (Series: 1–0)	Borac	Belgrade
17:30	Scoring by quarter: 27–18, 21–18, 21–17, 32–17
	Pts: Reath 17; Rebs: Dobrić 8 Asts: Radanov 6 PIR: Reath 24	Boxscore	Pts: Kočović 14; Rebs: Narandžić, Novaković 6 Asts: Lopez 5 PIR: Kočović 14	Arena: Aleksandar Nikolić Hall; Attendance: 0 Referees: Ilija Belošević, Radoš Arsenijević, Marko Pecelj

6 June 2021 Semifinals 2	Borac	57–80 (Series: 0–2)	Crvena zvezda mts	Čačak
20:00	Scoring by quarter: 8–19, 23–27, 13–15, 13–19
	Pts: Gavrilović, Đ. Ćurčić 10; Rebs: Todorović 6 Asts: Lakić, Todorović 3 PIR: Lakić 11	Boxscore	Pts: Dobrić 16; Rebs: Dobrić 9 Asts: Dobrić, Hall 5 PIR: Dobrić 24	Arena: Borac Hall; Attendance: 0 Referees: Uroš Nikolić, Siniša Prpa, Ivan Stefanović

9 June 2021 Finals 1	Crvena zvezda mts	98–69 (Series: 1–0)	Mega Soccerbet	Belgrade
20:00	Scoring by quarter: 31–17, 26–20, 21–19, 20–13
Arena Sport	Pts: Dobrić 20; Rebs: Dobrić, Kuzmić 6 Asts: Hall 6 PIR: Radanov 18	Boxscore	Pts: Cazalon 16; Rebs: Cazalon 5 Asts: Novak 6 PIR: Cazalon 16	Arena: Aleksandar Nikolić Hall; Attendance: 478; Referees: Ilija Belošević, Uroš Obrknežević, Aleksandar Glišić

11 June 2021 Finals 2	Mega Soccerbet	86–79 (Series: 1–1)	Crvena zvezda mts	Belgrade
20:20
	Pts: Simonović 19; Rebs: Simonović 20; Asts: Novak 7 PIR: Simonović 26	Boxscore	Pts: Dobrić 31; Rebs: Nnoko 9 Asts: Hall 6 PIR: Dobrić 33	Arena: Mega Factory; Attendance: 150; Referees: Milivoje Jovčić, Uroš Obrknežević, Vladimir Jevtović

13 June 2021 Finals 3	Crvena zvezda mts	77–65 (Series: 2–1)	Mega Soccerbet	Belgrade
20:30	Scoring by quarter: 21–24, 23–12, 13–14, 20–15
Arena Sport	Pts: Hall 24; Rebs: Nnoko 11; Asts: Hall 4 PIR: Hall 23	Boxscore	Pts: Petrušev, Simonović 15; Rebs: Simonović 10; Asts: Novak 6 PIR: Simonović 25	Arena: Aleksandar Nikolić Hall; Attendance: 3,732; Referees: Ilija Belošević, Milivoje Jovčić, Aleksandar Glišić

=== Radivoj Korać Cup ===
The 2021 Radivoj Korać Cup is the 19th season of the Serbian men's national basketball cup tournament. The tournament was held in Novi Sad between 11 and 14 February 2021. The club won its 7th Serbian Cup title following a 73–60 win over Mega Soccerbet.

Win Loss

All times are local UTC+1.

11 February 2021 Quarterfinals	Crvena zvezda mts	108–47	Radnički Kragujevac	Novi Sad
21:00	Scoring by quarter: 22–13, 27–12, 30–13, 29–9
Arena Sport	Pts: Lazić 17; Rebs: Jagodić-Kuridža 8 Asts: Uskoković 6 PIR: Lazić 23	Boxscore	Pts: Dumić 19; Rebs: Popović 8 Asts: Dumić 4 PIR: Dumić 21	Arena: SPC Vojvodina; Attendance: 30; Referees: Siniša Prpa, Nemanja Ninković, Petar Pešić

13 February 2021 Semifinals	Partizan NIS	78–79	Crvena zvezda mts	Novi Sad
21:00	Scoring by quarter: 27–22, 19–18, 12–15, 20–24
Arena Sport	Pts: Jaramaz 18; Rebs: Thomas 7 Asts: Jaramaz 9 PIR: Jaramaz 28	Boxscore	Pts: Loyd 24; Rebs: Kuzmić 7 Asts: Davidovac; PIR: Loyd 24	Arena: SPC Vojvodina; Attendance: 30; Referees: Ilija Belošević, Milivoje Jovčić, Uroš Nikolić

14 February 2021 Final	Mega Soccerbet	60–73	Crvena zvezda mts	Novi Sad
21:00	Scoring by quarter: 21–19, 19–17, 8–17, 12–20
Arena Sport	Pts: Petrušev 21; Rebs: Simonović 7 Asts: Smith 6 PIR: Petrušev 21	Boxscore	Pts: Davidovac, O'Bryant 14; Rebs: Jagodić-Kuridža 11; Asts: Davidovac 6 PIR: Jagodić-Kuridža 21	Arena: SPC Vojvodina; Attendance: 30; Referees: Ilija Belošević, Milivoje Jovčić, Uroš Obrknežević

=== Adriatic Supercup ===
The 2020 ABA Super Cup was scheduled to be the 4th tournament of the ABA Super Cup. On 29 June 2020, the ABA League Assembly canceled the tournament due to the COVID-19 pandemic.

It would have been played between 20 and 23 September 2020 in Podgorica, Montenegro.

== Individual awards ==
=== ABA League ===
MVP of the Round

Round	Player	PIR
4	(United States) Jordan Loyd	22
10	(Serbia) Ognjen Dobrić	25
SF3	(Serbia) Dejan Davidovac	33
F1	(United States) Jordan Loyd	23
F2	(Serbia) Ognjen Dobrić	27
F5	(Cameroon) Landry Nnoko	28

Source: ABA League

Finals MVP

Position	Player	Ref.
C	(Cameroon) Landry Nnoko	

Ideal Starting Five

Position	Player	Ref.
PG	(United States) Jordan Loyd	

Best Defender

Position	Player	Ref.
G/F	(Serbia) Branko Lazić	

=== EuroLeague ===
MVP of the Round

Round	Player	PIR	Source
2	(United States) Jordan Loyd	34	

=== Serbian League ===
Finals MVP Award

Position	Player	Source
SG	(Serbia) Ognjen Dobrić	

=== Serbian Cup ===
MVP Award

Position	Player	Source
PF	(Serbia) Marko Jagodić-Kuridža	

== Statistics ==
Legend
GP	Games played	GS	Games started	MPG	Minutes per game
FG%	Field-goal percentage	3FG%	3-point field-goal percentage	FT%	Free-throw percentage
RPG	Rebounds per game	APG	Assists per game	SPG	Steals per game
BPG	Blocks per game	PPG	Points per game	PIR	PIR per game

Player	Left during season

=== Adriatic League ===
Player	GP	GS	MPG	2FG%	3FG%	FT%	RPG	APG	SPG	BPG	PPG	PIR
Dejan Davidovac	31	13	23:00	.542	.386	.864	4.1	1.4	0.9	0.3	8.7	11.5
Ognjen Dobrić	31	7	23:00	.508	.432	.758	3.5	1.6	0.6	0.4	12.1	12.2
Langston Hall	29	17	16:00	.513	.382	.840	1.3	3.2	0.7	0.2	4.9	6.2
Marko Jagodić-Kuridža	19	12	17:00	.614	.476	.829	3.3	1.0	0.5	0.2	7.1	8.6
Ognjen Kuzmić	30	13	12:00	.613	.000	.564	3.9	0.3	0.3	0.4	4.0	5.9
Branko Lazić	27	23	19:00	.440	.507	.833	2.0	0.5	1.0	0.0	5.1	5.0
Jordan Loyd	30	26	25:00	.497	.385	.872	2.7	3.2	1.0	0.2	16.0	15.3
Landry Nnoko	20	16	21:00	.552	.000	.632	6.4	0.8	0.6	0.9	7.1	10.7
Aleksa Radanov	13	1	9:00	.444	.067	.556	1.2	0.9	0.3	0.1	2.8	1.5
Duop Reath	24	1	9:00	.577	.351	.381	2.3	0.3	0.3	0.5	4.5	3.8
Marko Simonović	27	10	18:00	.522	.364	.833	2.7	0.8	0.5	0.0	6.2	5.9
Aleksa Uskoković	19	1	9:00	.455	.412	.818	0.6	2.0	0.3	0.1	2.6	2.9
Corey Walden	28	15	21:00	.489	.407	.900	2.2	3.5	1.1	0.0	10.0	10.9
Quino Colom	4	0	13:00	.700	.231	.857	1.0	3.5	0.3	0.0	7.3	10.0
Johnny O'Bryant III	7	3	18:00	.400	.261	.762	5.3	1.1	0.6	0.4	10.6	9.6
Taylor Rochestie	6	1	17:00	.400	.438	.750	1.0	3.3	0.3	0.0	6.0	4.3
Boriša Simanić	6	1	11:00	.400	.444	.571	1.2	0.5	0.3	0.5	3.3	3.0
Emanuel Terry	7	0	15:00	.480	.000	.444	4.6	0.9	0.3	0.3	4.0	5.7

Last updated: May 28, 2021.
Source: Adriatic League

=== EuroLeague ===
Player	GP	GS	MPG	2FG%	3FG%	FT%	RPG	APG	SPG	BPG	PPG	PIR
Quino Colom	8	0	14:09	.412	.467	.783	0.9	2.5	0.1	0.0	6.6	5.9
Dejan Davidovac	33	8	22:39	.566	.378	.780	2.8	1.6	1.0	0.2	7.2	8.3
Ognjen Dobrić	32	7	18:37	.398	.456	.857	2.0	0.8	0.8	0.0	8.3	7.0
Langston Hall	21	14	16:13	.416	.414	1.000	1.6	2.8	0.8	0.1	5.2	4.1
Marko Jagodić-Kuridža	34	14	18:42	.382	.351	.775	2.9	1.1	0.4	0.1	4.4	4.5
Ognjen Kuzmić	32	25	13:55	.544	.000	.641	3.9	0.3	0.3	0.3	3.8	6.1
Branko Lazić	33	23	16:19	.389	.354	.909	1.3	0.7	0.6	0.0	2.7	1.6
Jordan Loyd	29	27	27:20	.519	.311	.906	3.6	3.2	1.2	0.2	17.3	16.5
Landry Nnoko	10	6	20:49	.582	.000	.583	5.2	0.7	0.6	0.7	7.1	9.8
Aleksa Radanov	14	3	11:23	.379	.300	.833	1.4	0.5	0.1	0.0	2.9	1.5
Duop Reath	23	8	13:19	.652	.350	.818	1.9	0.2	0.2	0.3	4.8	4.0
Marko Simonović	23	11	18:37	.371	.458	.714	2.3	0.5	0.3	0.0	5.3	4.7
Nikola Šaranović	Did not play											
Aleksa Uskoković	16	7	13:47	.525	.357	.800	1.5	2.1	0.3	0.0	4.3	3.8
Milutin Vujičić	Did not play											
Corey Walden	30	12	23:21	.462	.390	.838	1.8	2.3	0.9	0.1	10.5	9.9
Johnny O'Bryant III	16	2	20:41	.500	.324	.741	5.2	1.4	0.6	0.3	11.3	11.1
Taylor Rochestie	9	0	11:16	.563	.455	1.000	0.7	2.0	0.0	0.1	3.9	3.6
Boriša Simanić	3	0	4:20	.000	.500	.000	1.0	0.3	0.3	0.0	1.0	1.3
Emanuel Terry	9	3	18:51	.645	.000	.588	4.4	0.4	0.4	1.1	5.6	7.6

Last updated: April 8, 2021.
Source: EuroLeague

=== Serbian SuperLeague ===
Player	GP	GS	MPG	2FG%	3FG%	FT%	RPG	APG	SPG	BPG	PPG	PIR
Dejan Davidovac	7	2	22:51	.529	.370	.875	4.9	2.4	1.7	0.9	8.9	13.7
Ognjen Dobrić	7	6	27:18	.500	.450	.850	6.0	2.6	1.3	0.0	17.9	19.3
Langston Hall	7	7	24:13	.467	.394	1.000	1.3	4.7	1.0	0.0	10.3	11.0
Marko Jagodić-Kuridža	7	5	12:28	.563	.429	.833	2.6	0.9	0.3	0.0	5.9	6.1
Ognjen Kuzmić	6	0	14:12	.933	.000	.800	4.5	0.5	0.8	0.3	6.0	10.7
Branko Lazić	7	6	19:10	.714	.500	1.000	1.6	1.0	0.6	0.0	5.9	5.3
Jordan Loyd	2	1	10:06	.800	.250	.000	1.0	2.0	0.0	0.5	5.5	6.5
Landry Nnoko	7	7	18:41	.579	.000	.667	5.6	1.1	0.6	0.6	8.0	11.9
Aleksa Radanov	7	1	19:34	.783	.250	.667	3.3	2.6	1.1	0.0	8.7	11.0
Duop Reath	5	0	10:17	.538	.429	.800	2.8	0.4	0.2	0.8	6.2	7.4
Marko Simonović	7	0	17:42	.364	.300	.714	2.1	1.6	0.9	0.1	4.4	4.4
Aleksa Uskoković	7	0	15:34	.333	.417	.909	1.7	2.3	0.1	0.0	4.7	5.1
Corey Walden	Did not play											

Last updated: June 13, 2021.
Source: KLS

=== Radivoj Korać Cup ===
Player	GP	GS	MPG	2FG%	3FG%	FT%	RPG	APG	SPG	BPG	PPG	PIR
Quino Colom	Not added to the roster											
Dejan Davidovac	3	0	19:40	.600	.357	.889	2.3	4.3	0.7	0.3	13.7	16.3
Ognjen Dobrić	3	0	17:57	.333	.500	.600	2.7	0.7	0.7	0.3	7.3	7.7
Langston Hall	Not added to the roster											
Marko Jagodić-Kuridža	3	1	19:42	.800	.375	.500	6.7	2.3	1.0	0.0	6.7	13.0
Ognjen Kuzmić	3	3	19:10	.500	.000	.571	6.0	0.7	1.0	0.7	6.0	9.0
Branko Lazić	3	3	19:56	.600	.667	1.000	2.0	0.7	1.3	0.0	9.0	9.7
Jordan Loyd	3	3	25:32	.583	.286	.857	3.3	2.3	0.7	0.0	14.7	16.0
Landry Nnoko	Not added to the roster											
Johnny O'Bryant III	3	0	18:48	.368	.500	.857	5.3	1.3	0.0	0.7	11.7	10.0
Aleksa Radanov	2	1	9:55	.667	.000	.500	1.0	0.5	0.0	0.0	3.0	2.5
Duop Reath	Not added to the roster											
Boriša Simanić	1	0	13:14	1.000	.400	1.000	2.0	0.0	1.0	1.0	9.0	11.0
Marko Simonović	3	2	21:09	.400	.375	.750	3.0	1.3	2.0	0.0	5.3	7.3
Nikola Šaranović	Did not play											
Aleksa Uskoković	3	2	18:00	.429	.375	1.000	1.0	3.0	0.7	0.0	6.3	4.7
Milutin Vujičić	1	0	11:20	.000	.333	.000	1.0	3.0	0.0	0.0	3.0	3.0
Corey Walden	Not added to the roster											

Last updated: February 14, 2021.
Source: KSS

=== Head coaches records ===
Head coach	Competition	G	W	L	PF	PA	PD	Win %
Saša Obradović	Adriatic League	10	9	1	816	613	+186	.900
Saša Obradović	EuroLeague	16	5	11	1179	1235	–56	.313
Saša Obradović	Total	26	14	12	1995	1865	+130	.538
Dejan Radonjić	Adriatic League	16	14	2	1248	1064	+184	.875
Dejan Radonjić	ABA League Playoffs	8	5	3	605	568	+37	.625
Dejan Radonjić	Serbian League Playoffs	7	6	1	600	471	+129	.857
Dejan Radonjić	EuroLeague	18	5	13	1320	1449	–129	.278
Dejan Radonjić	Serbian Cup	3	3	0	260	185	+75	1.000
Dejan Radonjić	Total	52	33	19	4033	3737	+296	.635

Updated: June 13, 2021

== See also ==
- 2020–21 Red Star Belgrade season
