= 2021 Basketball League of Serbia playoffs =

Basketball play-off tournament

Tournament details
- Country: Serbia
- Dates: 27 May–13 June 2021
- Season: 2020–21
- Teams: 8
- Defending champions: Crvena zvezda mts

Final positions
- Champions: Crvena zvezda mts (21st title)
- Runners-up: Mega Soccerbet
- Semifinalists: Borac; Partizan NIS

Awards
- Best player: Ognjen Dobrić

The 2021 Basketball League of Serbia playoffs are the play-off tournament that decides the winner of the 2020–21 Basketball League of Serbia season. The playoffs is scheduled to start on 27 May and end on 13 June 2021.

== Qualified teams ==
First ABA League	Regular season
1 Crvena zvezda mts 2 Mega Soccerbet; 3 Partizan NIS; 4 FMP; 5 Borac	1 Mladost MaxBet; 2 Vojvodina; 3 Zlatibor

=== Personnel and sponsorship ===
Team	Head coach	Captain	Kit manufacturer	Shirt sponsor
Borac Čačak	(Serbia) Marko Marinović	(Serbia) Uroš Čarapić	—	P.S. Fashion
Crvena zvezda mts	(Montenegro) Dejan Radonjić	(Serbia) Branko Lazić	Adidas	mts
FMP	(Serbia) Vanja Guša	(Serbia) Radoš Šešlija	Adidas	FMP
Mega Soccerbet	(Serbia) Vlada Jovanović	(Serbia) Milenko Tepić	Adidas	Soccerbet / Tehnomanija
Mladost MaxBet	(Serbia) Dragan Jakovljević	(Serbia) Marko Milenković	Champion	—
Partizan NIS	(Serbia) Aleksandar Matović	(Serbia) Novica Veličković	Under Armour	NIS / mts
Vojvodina	(Serbia) Miroslav Nikolić	(Serbia) Krsto Bjelica	Peak	—
Zlatibor	(Serbia) Strajin Nedović	(Serbia) Bogdan Riznić	Ardu Sport	—

== Bracket ==
Quarterfinals
31 May–1 June
Crvena zvezda mts	2
Zlatibor	0
27–29 May
FMP	0
Borac	2
27–29 May
Mega Soccerbet	2
Vojvodina	0
27–29 May
Partizan NIS	2
Mladost MaxBet	0

Semifinals
4–6 June
Crvena zvezda mts	2
Borac	0
1–5 June
Mega Soccerbet	2
Partizan NIS	1

Final
9–13 June
Crvena zvezda mts	2
Mega Soccerbet	1

== Quarterfinals ==
The quarterfinals are scheduled between 27 May–1 June 2021. Crvena zvezda played the 2021 ABA League Playoffs so their games were rescheduled.

Team 1	Series	Team 2	Game 1	Game 2	Game 3
Crvena zvezda mts	2–0	Zlatibor	74–56	91–68	—
FMP	0–2	Borac	67–77	85–92	—
Mega Soccerbet	2–0	Vojvodina	77–66	95–87	—
Partizan NIS	2–0	Mladost MaxBet	70–50	94–84	—

=== Game 1 ===
27 May 2021	Mega Soccerbet	77–66 (Series: 1–0)	Vojvodina	Belgrade
12:00	Scoring by quarter: 28–20, 13–13, 21–16, 15–17
	Pts: Petrušev 20; Rebs: Simonović 8 Asts: Novak 9 PIR: Petrušev 26	Boxscore	Pts: Gaćeša 18; Rebs: Gaćeša 8 Asts: Rakićević, Ljubičić 3 PIR: Gaćeša 19	Arena: Mega Factory; Attendance: 20; Referees: Ilija Belošević, Radoš Arsenijević, Ljubomir Marković

27 May 2021	FMP	67–77 (Series: 0–1)	Borac	Belgrade
16:00	Scoring by quarter: 20–27, 18–20, 12–15, 17–15
	Pts: Čović 12; Rebs: Lazarević 13; Asts: Nenadić 5 PIR: Lazarević 19	Boxscore	Pts: Lopez 16; Rebs: Nerandžić 9 Asts: Kočović, Lopez 5 PIR: Nerandžić 24	Arena: Železnik Hall; Attendance: 30; Referees: Uroš Obrknežević, Vladimir Jevtović, Stefan Ćalić

27 May 2021	Partizan NIS	70–50 (Series: 1–0)	Mladost MaxBet	Belgrade
18:00	Scoring by quarter: 21–14, 11–12, 17–14, 21–10
	Pts: Trifunović 16; Rebs: Miletić 12; Asts: Perkins 6 PIR: Janković 17	Boxscore	Pts: Gombauld 14; Rebs: Gombauld, Belić 5 Asts: Mitchell 4 PIR: Gombauld, Belić 13	Arena: Ranko Žeravica Sports Hall; Referees: Milivoje Jovčić, Ivan Stefanović, Nemanja Vlahović

31 May 2021	Crvena zvezda mts	74–56 (Series: 1–0)	Zlatibor	Belgrade
18:00	Scoring by quarter: 29–12, 14–16, 19–14, 12–14
	Pts: Radanov 12; Rebs: Davidovac 8 Asts: Uskoković 6 PIR: Davidovac 16	Boxscore	Pts: Protić 11; Rebs: Miljanić 8 Asts: three players 3 PIR: Miljanić 11	Arena: Aleksandar Nikolić Hall; Attendance: 0 Referees: Aleksandar Glišić, Marko Pecelj, Duško Sedlar

=== Game 2 ===
29 May 2021	Vojvodina	87–95 (Series: 0–2)	Mega Soccerbet	Novi Sad
12:00	Scoring by quarter: 18–26, 17–27, 27–24, 25–18
	Pts: Beslać 20; Rebs: Nikolić, Rakićević 5 Asts: Ljubičić 6 PIR: Ljubičić 26	Boxscore	Pts: Petrušev 21; Rebs: Petrušev 12; Asts: Novak 6 PIR: Petrušev 42	Arena: SPC Vojvodina; Attendance: 25; Referees: Vladimir Jevtović, Siniša Prpa, Miloš Hadžić

29 May 2021	Borac	92–85 (Series: 2–0)	FMP	Čačak
16:00	Scoring by quarter: 20–17, 20–26, 26–20, 26–22
	Pts: Nerandžić, Čarapić 16; Rebs: Todorović 9 Asts: Lakić 5 PIR: Čarapić 19	Boxscore	Pts: Pecarski 26; Rebs: Nenadić 13; Asts: Radovanović 5 PIR: Pecarski, Nenadić 35	Arena: Borac Hall; Referees: Milivoje Jovčić, Aleksandar Glišić, Nemanja Ninković

29 May 2021	Mladost MaxBet	84–94 (Series: 0–2)	Partizan NIS	Belgrade
18:00	Scoring by quarter: 18–20, 21–28, 20–24, 25–22
	Pts: Igbanu 20; Rebs: Gombauld 5 Asts: Milosavljević 9 PIR: Gombauld 26	Boxscore	Pts: Trifunović 19; Rebs: Janković 8 Asts: Jaramaz 7 PIR: Trifunović 22	Arena: Master Sport Center; Attendance: 20; Referees: Uroš Obrknežević, Vladimir Vesković, Marko Strika

1 June 2021	Zlatibor	68–91 (Series: 0–2)	Crvena zvezda mts	Čajetina
18:00	Scoring by quarter: 13–21, 19–26, 19–18, 17–26
	Pts: Kutlešić 14; Rebs: Riznić 7 Asts: Miljanić 5 PIR: Riznić 14	Boxscore	Pts: Dobrić 21; Rebs: Three players 5 Asts: Uskoković 4 PIR: Dobrić 22	Arena: Čajetina Sport Center; Attendance: 0 Referees: Ilija Belošević, Aleksandar Milojević, Dragan Matić

== Semifinals ==
Team 1	Series	Team 2	Game 1	Game 2	Game 3
Crvena zvezda mts	2–0	Borac	101–70	80–57	—
Mega Soccerbet	2–1	Partizan NIS	94–86	77–81	82–68

=== Game 1 ===
4 June 2021	Crvena zvezda mts	101–70 (Series: 1–0)	Borac	Belgrade
17:30	Scoring by quarter: 27–18, 21–18, 21–17, 32–17
	Pts: Reath 17; Rebs: Dobrić 8 Asts: Radanov 6 PIR: Reath 24	Boxscore	Pts: Kočović 14; Rebs: Narandžić, Novaković 6 Asts: Lopez 5 PIR: Kočović 14	Arena: Aleksandar Nikolić Hall; Attendance: 0 Referees: Ilija Belošević, Radoš Arsenijević, Marko Pecelj

1 June 2021	Mega Soccerbet	94–86 (Series: 1–0)	Partizan NIS	Belgrade
20:30	Scoring by quarter: 34–18, 16–24, 25–18, 19–26
	Pts: Cazalon 23; Rebs: Petrušev 8 Asts: Novak 8 PIR: Petrušev 28	Boxscore	Pts: Mika 22; Rebs: Mika 11; Asts: Jaramaz 8 PIR: Mika 35	Arena: Mega Factory; Attendance: 20; Referees: Ilija Belošević, Uroš Obrknežević, Siniša Prpa

=== Game 2 ===
6 June 2021	Borac	57–80 (Series: 0–2)	Crvena zvezda mts	Čačak
20:00	Scoring by quarter: 8–19, 23–27, 13–15, 13–19
	Pts: Gavrilović, Đ. Ćurčić 10; Rebs: Todorović 6 Asts: Lakić, Todorović 3 PIR: Lakić 11	Boxscore	Pts: Dobrić 16; Rebs: Dobrić 9 Asts: Dobrić, Hall 5 PIR: Dobrić 24	Arena: Borac Hall; Attendance: 0 Referees: Uroš Nikolić, Siniša Prpa, Ivan Stefanović

3 June 2021	Partizan NIS	81–77 (Series: 1–1)	Mega Soccerbet	Belgrade
19:00	Scoring by quarter: 12–25, 28–13, 23–23, 18–16
	Pts: Mika 19; Rebs: Veličković 6 Asts: Jaramaz 10; PIR: Jaramaz 24	Boxscore	Pts: Simonović 15; Rebs: Petrušev 9 Asts: Tepić 9 PIR: Simonović 20	Arena: Ranko Žeravica Sports Hall; Attendance: 1,027; Referees: Milivoje Jovčić, Aleksandar Glišić, Vladimir Jevtović

=== Game 3 ===
5 June 2021	Mega Soccerbet	82–68 (Series: 2–1)	Partizan NIS	Belgrade
20:00	Scoring by quarter: 18–17, 25–18, 19–18, 20–15
	Pts: Cazalon 18; Rebs: Petrušev, Simonović 9 Asts: Tepić 7 PIR: Simonović 21	Boxscore	Pts: Jaramaz 19; Rebs: Veličković 7 Asts: Dangubić, Jaramaz 4 PIR: Jaramaz 17	Arena: Mega Factory; Attendance: 100; Referees: Ilija Belošević, Milivoje Jovčić, Uroš Nikolić

== Finals ==
Team 1	Series	Team 2	Game 1	Game 2	Game 3
Crvena zvezda mts	2–1	Mega Soccerbet	98–69	79–86	77–65

=== Game 1 ===
9 June 2021	Crvena zvezda mts	98–69 (Series: 1–0)	Mega Soccerbet	Belgrade
20:00	Scoring by quarter: 31–17, 26–20, 21–19, 20–13
Arena Sport	Pts: Dobrić 20; Rebs: Dobrić, Kuzmić 6 Asts: Hall 6 PIR: Radanov 18	Boxscore	Pts: Cazalon 16; Rebs: Cazalon 5 Asts: Novak 6 PIR: Cazalon 16	Arena: Aleksandar Nikolić Hall; Attendance: 478; Referees: Ilija Belošević, Uroš Obrknežević, Aleksandar Glišić

Starters:			Pts	Reb	Ast
PG	1	(United States) Langston Hall	2	1	6
G/F	13	(Serbia) Ognjen Dobrić	20	6	3
G/F	10	(Serbia) Branko Lazić	9	0	0
PF	21	(Serbia) Marko Jagodić-Kuridža	12	5	2
C	35	(Cameroon) Landry Nnoko	10	5	1
Reserves:					
SG	3	(United States) Jordan Loyd	9	1	3
PG	4	(Serbia) Aleksa Uskoković	0	2	2
G/F	7	(Serbia) Dejan Davidovac	8	3	2
F/C	11	(Australia) Duop Reath	3	0	1
SG	12	(Serbia) Aleksa Radanov	15	5	1
F	19	(Serbia) Marko Simonović	6	2	2
C	32	(Serbia) Ognjen Kuzmić	4	6	1
Head coach:
(Basketball Federation of Montenegro) Dejan Radonjić

Crvena zvezda	Mega

CZV	Statistics	MEG
22/33 (67%)	2-pt field goals	14/36 (39%)
16/34 (47%)	3-pt field goals	8/22 (36%)
6/10 (60%)	Free throws	17/21 (81%)
15	Offensive rebounds	13
25	Defensive rebounds	15
40	Total rebounds	28
22	Assists	18
10	Turnovers	11
4	Steals	6
3 (1)	Blocks	1 (3)
17 (15)	Fouls	15 (17)

Starters:			Pts	Reb	Ast
PG	10	(Serbia) Jovan Novak	5	2	6
SG	20	(France) Malcolm Cazalon	16	5	3
SG	21	(Serbia) Dragan Milosavljević	6	0	3
F/C	3	(Serbia) Filip Petrušev	5	2	0
C	11	(Montenegro) Marko Simonović	8	4	0
Reserves:					
G	5	(Serbia) Milenko Tepić	6	3	3
SF	7	(Montenegro) Marko Kljajević	DNP		
G	9	(Serbia) Stefan Momirov	3	1	1
G/F	13	(Serbia) Luka Cerovina	3	1	1
F/C	17	(Bosnia and Herzegovina) Karlo Matković	10	1	1
PF	22	(Serbia) Boriša Simanić	7	3	0
PF	30	(Serbia) Aleksandar Langović	DNP		
Head coach:
(Basketball Federation of Serbia) Vlada Jovanović

=== Game 2 ===
11 June 2021	Mega Soccerbet	86–79 (Series: 1–1)	Crvena zvezda mts	Belgrade
20:00	Scoring by quarter: 35–17, 10–29, 20–12, 21–21
	Pts: Simonović 19; Rebs: Simonović 20; Asts: Novak 7 PIR: Simonović 26	Boxscore	Pts: Dobrić 31; Rebs: Nnoko 9 Asts: Hall 6 PIR: Dobrić 33	Arena: Mega Factory; Attendance: 150; Referees: Milivoje Jovčić, Uroš Obrknežević, Vladimir Jevtović

Starters:			Pts	Reb	Ast
PG	10	(Serbia) Jovan Novak	4	3	7
SG	20	(France) Malcolm Cazalon	9	6	2
SG	21	(Serbia) Dragan Milosavljević	12	2	1
F/C	3	(Serbia) Filip Petrušev	16	3	1
C	11	(Montenegro) Marko Simonović	19	20	1
Reserves:					
G	5	(Serbia) Milenko Tepić	9	3	4
SF	7	(Montenegro) Marko Kljajević	DNP		
G	9	(Serbia) Stefan Momirov	3	0	0
G/F	13	(Serbia) Luka Cerovina	3	1	0
F/C	17	(Bosnia and Herzegovina) Karlo Matković	8	5	0
PF	22	(Serbia) Boriša Simanić	3	1	1
PF	30	(Serbia) Aleksandar Langović	DNP		
Head coach:
(Basketball Federation of Serbia) Vlada Jovanović

Mega	Crvena zvezda

MEG	Statistics	CZV
25/43 (58%)	2-pt field goals	17/39 (44%)
7/23 (30%)	3-pt field goals	10/21 (48%)
15/24 (62%)	Free throws	15/18 (83%)
20	Offensive rebounds	9
26	Defensive rebounds	20
46	Total rebounds	29
18	Assists	14
13	Turnovers	8
3	Steals	5
1 (4)	Blocks	4 (1)
20 (22)	Fouls	23 (20)

Starters:			Pts	Reb	Ast
PG	1	(United States) Langston Hall	19	1	6
G/F	13	(Serbia) Ognjen Dobrić	31	3	3
G/F	10	(Serbia) Branko Lazić	3	1	1
PF	21	(Serbia) Marko Jagodić-Kuridža	0	1	0
C	35	(Cameroon) Landry Nnoko	10	9	0
Reserves:					
PG	4	(Serbia) Aleksa Uskoković	2	0	0
G/F	7	(Serbia) Dejan Davidovac	10	4	5
F/C	11	(Australia) Duop Reath	DNP		
SG	12	(Serbia) Aleksa Radanov	0	1	0
F	19	(Serbia) Marko Simonović	2	3	0
C	32	(Serbia) Ognjen Kuzmić	2	4	0
Head coach:
(Basketball Federation of Montenegro) Dejan Radonjić

=== Game 3 ===
13 June 2021	Crvena zvezda mts	77–65 (Series: 2–1)	Mega Soccerbet	Belgrade
20:30	Scoring by quarter: 21–24, 23–12, 13–14, 20–15
	Pts: Hall 24; Rebs: Nnoko 11; Asts: Hall 4 PIR: Hall 23	Boxscore	Pts: Petrušev, Simonović 15; Rebs: Simonović 10; Asts: Novak 6 PIR: Simonović 25	Arena: Aleksandar Nikolić Hall; Attendance: 3,732; Referees: Ilija Belošević, Milivoje Jovčić, Aleksandar Glišić

Starters:			Pts	Reb	Ast
PG	1	(United States) Langston Hall	24	0	4
G/F	13	(Serbia) Ognjen Dobrić	15	9	3
G/F	10	(Serbia) Branko Lazić	0	1	1
PF	21	(Serbia) Marko Jagodić-Kuridža	0	0	0
C	35	(Cameroon) Landry Nnoko	6	11	1
Reserves:					
SG	3	(United States) Jordan Loyd	DNP		
PG	4	(Serbia) Aleksa Uskoković	5	1	0
G/F	7	(Serbia) Dejan Davidovac	10	7	2
F/C	11	(Australia) Duop Reath	DNP		
SG	12	(Serbia) Aleksa Radanov	2	0	1
F	19	(Serbia) Marko Simonović	13	2	2
C	32	(Serbia) Ognjen Kuzmić	2	2	0
Head coach:
(Basketball Federation of Montenegro) Dejan Radonjić

Crvena zvezda	Mega

CZV	Statistics	MEG
20/45 (44%)	2-pt field goals	14/28 (50%)
9/23 (39%)	3-pt field goals	7/25 (28%)
10/16 (62%)	Free throws	16/20 (80%)
14	Offensive rebounds	11
24	Defensive rebounds	27
38	Total rebounds	38
14	Assists	17
8	Turnovers	17
9	Steals	6
1 (4)	Blocks	4 (1)
21 (21)	Fouls	21 (21)

Starters:			Pts	Reb	Ast
PG	10	(Serbia) Jovan Novak	2	0	6
SG	20	(France) Malcolm Cazalon	2	5	1
SG	21	(Serbia) Dragan Milosavljević	8	1	1
F/C	3	(Serbia) Filip Petrušev	15	6	1
C	11	(Montenegro) Marko Simonović	15	10	0
Reserves:					
G	5	(Serbia) Milenko Tepić	3	6	5
SF	7	(Montenegro) Marko Kljajević	DNP		
G	9	(Serbia) Stefan Momirov	3	1	3
G/F	13	(Serbia) Luka Cerovina	5	1	2
F/C	17	(Bosnia and Herzegovina) Karlo Matković	9	4	0
PF	22	(Serbia) Boriša Simanić	3	0	0
PF	30	(Serbia) Aleksandar Langović	DNP		
Head coach:
(Basketball Federation of Serbia) Vlada Jovanović

== See also ==
- List of current Basketball League of Serbia team rosters
- 2021 ABA League First Division Playoffs

Teams

- 2020–21 KK Crvena zvezda season
- 2020–21 KK Partizan season
