= Aleksandar Lukman =

Serbian strength and conditioning coach, and former pole vaulter

- Lukman in 2026

Personal information
- Born: April 29, 1967 (age 59) Belgrade, SR Serbia, SFR Yugoslavia
- Position: Strength and conditioning coach
- Coaching career: 1995–present

Career history

Coaching
- 1995–1996: Partizan Youth (conditioning)
- 1996–1997: Radnički Belgrade (conditioning)
- 1997–1999: Crvena zvezda (conditioning)
- 2003–2005: Hemofarm (conditioning)
- 2005–2007: Lokomotiv Kuban (conditioning)
- 2007–2009: UNICS (conditioning)
- 2009–2010: Crvena zvezda (conditioning)
- 2010–2011: FMP (conditioning)
- 2011–2013: Crvena zvezda (conditioning)
- 2013–2016: Khimki (conditioning)
- 2017: Serbia Women (conditioning)
- 2018–2020, 2020–2022: Crvena zvezda (conditioning)

Aleksandar Lukman (Serbian Cyrillic: Александар Лукман; born April 29, 1967) is a Serbian professional basketball strength and conditioning and alpine skiing coach and former pole vaulter.

== Early life and education ==
Lukman was born in Belgrade, SR Serbia, SFR Yugoslavia, where he finished an elementary and a high school. He earned his bachelor's degree in physical education from the University of Belgrade in 1991 and earned his doctor's degree from the Faculty of sport and tourism – TIMS in Novi Sad in 2008.

== Coaching career in basketball ==
Lukman started his strength and conditioning coaching career in 1995. He was a strength and conditioning coach of Radnički Belgrade, Crvena zvezda and Hemofarm, as well as Russian teams Lokomotiv Kuban, UNICS and Khimki.

On July 15, 2018, Lukman was named a conditioning coach for Crvena zvezda. In June 2020, Crvena zvezda parted ways with him. In December 2020, he returned to the Zvezda for the rest of the 2020–21 season. In June 2022, he left Zvezda.

== Career achievements and awards ==
Basketball career

- EuroCup Basketball champion: 1 (with Khimki: 2014–15)
- Adriatic League champion: 4 (with Hemofarm: 2004–05; with Crvena zvezda: 2018–19, 2020–21, 2021–22)
- Serbian League champion: 3 (with Crvena zvezda: 2018–19, 2020–21, 2021–22)
- Yugoslav League champion: 1 (with Crvena zvezda: 1997–98)
- Serbian Cup winner: 3 (with Crvena zvezda: 2012–13, 2020–21, 2021–22)
- Russian Cup winner: 1 (with UNICS: 2008–09)
- Adriatic Supercup winner: 1 (with Crvena zvezda: 2018)
