= Milutin Vujičić =

Serbian basketball player (born 2002)

No. 27 – Igokea
- Position: Point guard
- League: Bosnian League; ABA League

Personal information
- Born: 8 March 2002 (age 24) Podgorica, Montenegro, FR Yugoslavia
- Listed height: 1.92 m (6 ft 4 in)

Career information
- Playing career: 2021–present

Career history
- 2021–2023: Crvena zvezda
- 2021–2022: →FMP
- 2023–2024: Zlatibor
- 2024: Čačak 94
- 2025–2026: Uppsala
- 2026–present: Igokea

Career highlights
- Serbian Cup winner (2021)

Milutin Vujičić (Serbian Cyrillic: Милутин Вујичић; born Milutin Ostojić, 8 March 2002) is a Serbian professional basketball player for Igokea of the Bosnian League and the ABA League.

== Early life ==
Born in Podgorica, Yugoslavia (nowadays in Montenegro) as Milutin Ostojić (Serbian Cyrillic: Милутин Остојић), Vujičić spent his childhood in Foča, Bosnia and Herzegovina. He started to play basketball with KK Sutjeska Foča. Later he moved to the Crvena zvezda youth system.

== Playing career ==
In February 2021, head coach Dejan Radonjić added Vujičić to the Crvena zvezda mts roster for the 2021 Radivoj Korać Cup tournament in Novi Sad. On 11 February, he made his debut for Crvena zvezda in a 108–47 win over Radnički Kragujevac, making 3 points, 3 assists and a rebound in 11 minutes of playing time. Following a win over Mega Soccerbet in the Cup Finals, the Zvezda won its 10th National cup title while Vujičić won his first trophy. On 19 February, Vujičić was a member of the Zvezda roster for a EuroLeague game with Zenit Saint Petersburg without any played time. On 23 February, Vujičić officially signed a four-year professional contract with Crvena zvezda mts.

In May 2021, Vujičić was loaned to FMP for the 2021 Basketball League of Serbia playoffs. In August 2021, he was added to their roster for 2021–22 season.

== National team career ==
In January 2018, he was added to a 22-man preliminary roster of the Bosnia and Herzegovina national under-16 team for an international youth tournament in Sakarya, Turkey.
