= Lautaro López (basketball) =

Argentine basketball player (born 1999)

No. 0 – KK Bosna Royal
- Position: Point guard
- League: Bosnian League; ABA League

Personal information
- Born: 8 January 1999 (age 27) Resistencia, Argentina
- Listed height: 1.88 m (6 ft 2 in)
- Listed weight: 81 kg (179 lb)

Career information
- NBA draft: 2021: undrafted
- Playing career: 2016–present

Career history
- 2016–2017: San Lorenzo
- 2017–2019: Baskonia II
- 2019–2020: Kirolbet Baskonia
- 2020–2021: Inter Bratislava
- 2021–2022: Borac Čačak
- 2022–present: Spišskí Rytieri
- 2024-2025: Kapfenberg Bulls
- 2025–present: Bosna BH Telecom

Career highlights
- Argentine League champion (2017); Super 4 Tournament winner (2017)
Medals
Men's basketball
Representing Argentina
FIBA Americas Under-16 Championship
Bronze medal – third place	2015 Argentina

Lautaro Tomas López (born 8 January 1999) is an Argentine professional basketball player for Bosna of the Bosnian League and the ABA League.

== Playing career ==
In February 2018, López joined the Basketball Without Borders Global Camp in New Orleans, US.

López made his EuroLeague debut with Kirolbet Baskonia on 26 December 2019 in a 102–77 loss to Anadolu Efes, recording 2 assists in 3 minutes.

In May 2021, López signed a contract with Borac Čačak for the 2021 BLS playoffs. On 6 June, he signed a contract extension with Borac for the 2021–22 season.

For the 2022–23 season, he signed with Slovak club Spišskí Rytieri.

== National team career ==
López was a member of the Argentina U16 national team that won the bronze medal at the 2015 FIBA Americas Under-16 Championship in Bahía Blanca, Argentina. Over five tournament games, he averaged 17.8 points, 3.8 rebounds, and 2.8 assists per game. He was a member of the Argentina U17 team that finished 13th at the 2016 FIBA Under-17 World Championship in Zaragoza, Spain. Over seven tournament games, he averaged team-high 17.1 points, 6.7 rebounds, and 2.7 assists per game. López was a member of the Argentina U18 team that finished 5th at the 2016 FIBA Americas Under-18 Championship in Valdivia, Chile. Over five tournament games, he averaged 6.6 points, 2.4 rebounds, and 2.8 assists per game. He was a member of the Argentina U19 national team that finished 8th at the 2017 FIBA Under-19 Basketball World Cup in Cairo, Egypt. Over seven tournament games, he averaged 7.6 points, 4.3 rebounds, and 3.3 assists per game.
