= Johnny O'Bryant III =

American basketball player (born 1993)

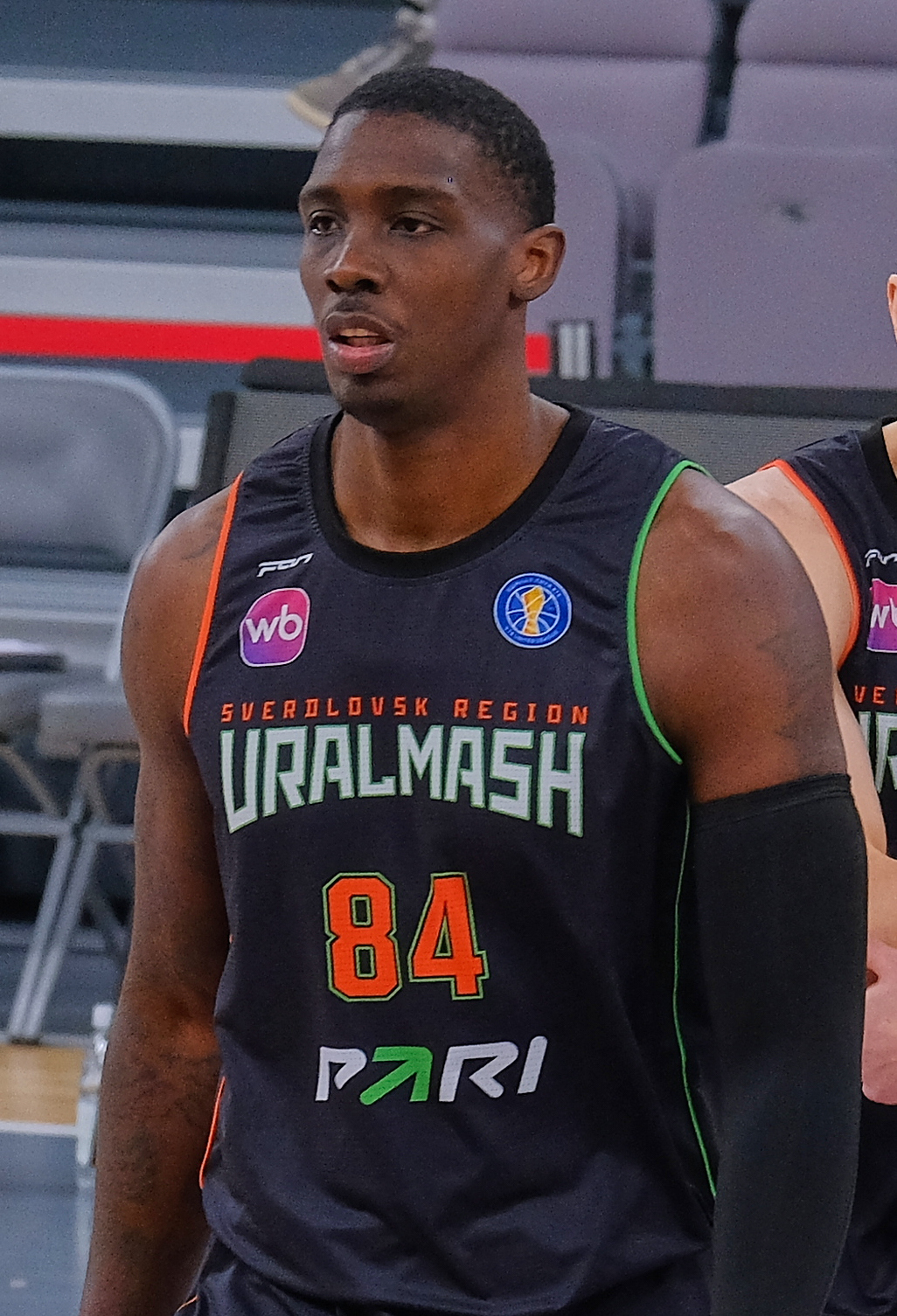
- O'Bryant with Uralmash Yekaterinburg in 2024

No. 0 – Goyang Sono Skygunners
- Position: Center / power forward
- League: KBL

Personal information
- Born: June 1, 1993 (age 33) Cleveland, Mississippi, U.S.
- Listed height: 6 ft 9 in (2.06 m)
- Listed weight: 245 lb (111 kg)

Career information
- High school: East Side (Cleveland, Mississippi)
- College: LSU (2011–2014)
- NBA draft: 2014: 2nd round, 36th overall pick
- Drafted by: Milwaukee Bucks
- Playing career: 2014–present

Career history
- 2014–2016: Milwaukee Bucks
- 2016–2017: Northern Arizona Suns
- 2017: Denver Nuggets
- 2017–2018: Charlotte Hornets
- 2018–2019: Maccabi Tel Aviv
- 2019–2020: Lokomotiv Kuban
- 2020–2021: Crvena zvezda
- 2021: Türk Telekom
- 2021–2022: Wonju DB Promy
- 2022: Meralco Bolts
- 2022–2023: Shanghai Sharks
- 2023–2024: Ibaraki Robots
- 2024: Gigantes de Carolina
- 2024–2025: Uralmash Yekaterinburg
- 2025: Anyang Jung Kwan Jang Red Boosters
- 2025: Sagesse SC
- 2025–2026: Anyang Jung Kwan Jang Red Boosters
- 2026–present: Goyang Sono Skygunners

Career highlights
- Israeli League champion (2019); Serbian Cup winner (2021); NBA D-League All-Star (2017); 2× First-team All-SEC (2013, 2014); McDonald's All-American (2011); Fourth-team Parade All-American (2011)
- Stats at NBA.com
- Stats at Basketball Reference
Medals
Men's basketball
Representing the United States
FIBA World U17 Championship
Gold medal – first place	2010 Hamburg	National team

Johnny Lee O'Bryant III (born June 1, 1993) is an American professional basketball player for the Goyang Sono Skygunners of the Korean Basketball League (KBL). He played college basketball for the LSU Tigers.

== High school career ==
Considered a four-star recruit by ESPN.com, O'Bryant was listed as the No. 7 power forward and the No. 46 player in the nation in 2011.

== College career ==
In his three-year college career at Louisiana State University, O'Bryant was one of just 14 LSU players to record 1,000 career points and 700 career rebounds. He was also a two-time first-team All-SEC honoree.

On April 1, 2014, he declared for the NBA draft, foregoing his final year of college eligibility.

== Professional career ==
=== Milwaukee Bucks (2014–2016) ===
On June 26, 2014, O'Bryant was selected with the 36th overall pick in the 2014 NBA draft by the Milwaukee Bucks. On July 30, 2014, he signed with the Bucks after averaging 8.2 points in five Summer League games for the team. On October 9, he suffered a grade III sprain of the medial collateral ligament (MCL) in his right knee. The injury ruled him out of the first 25 games of the season, as he made his debut for the Bucks on December 17. On December 26, he scored a season-high 12 points in a 107–77 win over the Atlanta Hawks.

On November 11, 2015, O'Bryant had a season-best game with 11 points and 9 rebounds in a loss to the Denver Nuggets.

On June 29, 2016, O'Bryant was waived by the Bucks.

On September 23, 2016, O'Bryant signed with the Washington Wizards, but was later waived on October 21 after appearing in four preseason games.

=== Northern Arizona Suns (2016–2017) ===
On November 11, 2016, O'Bryant was acquired by the Northern Arizona Suns of the NBA Development League. He made his debut for the Suns in the team's season opener the following day, recording 18 points and 12 rebounds in a 122–106 win over the Iowa Energy. On January 16, 2017, he was named NBA Development League Performer of the Week for games played Monday, January 9 through Sunday, January 15.

=== Denver Nuggets (2017) ===
On January 26, 2017, O'Bryant signed a 10-day contract with the Denver Nuggets. On February 6, 2017, he signed a second 10-day contract with the Nuggets.

=== Return to Northern Arizona (2017) ===
O'Bryant returned to the Northern Arizona Suns on February 16 following the expiration of his second 10-day contract. Two days later, he participated in NBA D-League All-Star Game.

=== Charlotte Hornets (2017–2018) ===
On February 24, 2017, O'Bryant signed a 10-day contract with the Charlotte Hornets. On March 4, 2017, he scored a career-high 15 points in a 112–102 win over the Denver Nuggets. Two days later, he signed a second 10-day contract with the Hornets. On March 16, 2017, he signed a multi-year contract with the Hornets.

On February 7, 2018, O'Bryant, along with two future second-round draft picks (2020 and 2021), was traded to the New York Knicks in exchange for Willy Hernangómez. He was waived by the Knicks the next day.

=== Maccabi Tel Aviv (2018–2019) ===
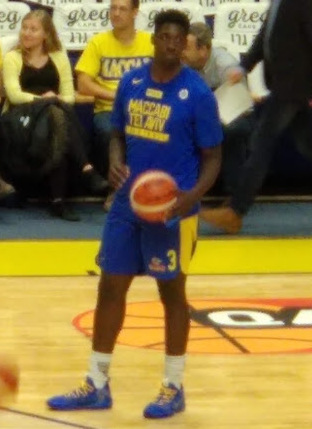
O'Bryant with Maccabi Tel Aviv in March 2019

On July 31, 2018, O'Bryant signed a one-year deal with the Israeli team Maccabi Tel Aviv of the EuroLeague. On December 27, 2018, O'Bryant recorded a career-high 32 points, shooting 5-of-7 from 3-point range, along with five rebounds, three assists and three steals for 44 PIR, leading Maccabi to a 94–92 win over Olimpia Milano. Two days later, he was named EuroLeague Round 15 MVP. O'Bryant went on to win the 2019 Israeli League Championship with Maccabi.

=== Lokomotiv Kuban (2019–2020) ===
On August 14, 2019, O'Bryant signed with Lokomotiv Kuban of the VTB United League. He averaged 16.4 points, 5.7 rebounds, and 2.6 assists per game in VTB play. O'Bryant re-signed with the team on July 21, 2020. However, on September 18, he parted ways with the team due to a family issue.

=== Crvena zvezda (2020–2021) ===
On October 19, 2020, O'Bryant signed with Crvena Zvezda of the Adriatic League and the EuroLeague. On January 27, 2021, he received a 10-day suspension from the club due to a conflict with team head coach Dejan Radonjić during a game against Anadolu Efes. On February 21, the Zvezda parted ways with O'Bryant.

=== Türk Telekom (2021) ===
On February 21, 2021, O'Bryant signed with Türk Telekom of the Turkish Basketball Super League, for the remainder of the season.

On September 29, 2021, the Milwaukee Bucks signed O'Bryant to a training camp deal. He did not make the final roster however, and was waived on October 11.

=== Wonju DB Promy (2021–2022) ===
On November 15, 2021, O'Bryant signed with the Wonju DB Promy of the Korean Basketball League to replace Yante Maten for eight weeks. On January 3, 2022, his contract was expired. On January 5, he re-signed with the Wonju DB Promy for the remainder of the season.

=== Meralco Bolts (2022) ===
On August 6, 2022, he signed with the Meralco Bolts of the Philippine Basketball Association (PBA) as the team's import for the 2022–23 PBA Commissioner's Cup. He was set to be replaced by Jessie Govan after a 1–5 start to the conference, but O'Bryant stayed with the team when Govan was measured above the conference's 6'10" height limit. He was supposed to play another game on October 30, but the game was postponed due to Tropical Storm Paeng. On October 31, he was finally replaced by K. J. McDaniels.

=== Shanghai Sharks (2022–2023) ===
In October 2022, O'Bryant signed with the Shanghai Sharks of the Chinese Basketball Association.

=== Ibaraki Robots (2023–2024) ===
On November 15, 2023, O'Bryant signed with the Ibaraki Robots of the B.League. On April 9, 2024, his contract was terminated.

=== Gigantes de Carolina (2024) ===
On July 12, 2024, O'Bryant signed with the Gigantes de Carolina of the Baloncesto Superior Nacional (BSN).

=== Uralmash Yekaterinburg (2024–2025) ===
On September 23, 2024, O'Bryant signed with the Uralmash Yekaterinburg of the VTB United League. On January 9, 2025, Uralmash Yekaterinburg parted ways with O'Bryant.

=== Anyang Jung Kwan Jang Red Boosters (2025) ===
On January 13, 2025, O'Bryant signed with the Anyang Jung Kwan Jang Red Boosters of the Korean Basketball League (KBL) to replace Cliff Alexander.

=== Sagesse SC (2025) ===
On April 18, 2025, O'Bryant signed with the Sagesse SC.

== Business career ==
O'Bryant founded the anime and manga publisher Noir Caesar in 2017. The company signed a deal with Tokyopop in 2023.

== Career statistics ==
Legend
GP	Games played	GS	Games started	MPG	Minutes per game
FG%	Field goal percentage	3P%	3-point field goal percentage	FT%	Free throw percentage
RPG	Rebounds per game	APG	Assists per game	SPG	Steals per game
BPG	Blocks per game	PPG	Points per game	**Bold**	Career high

=== NBA ===
==== Regular season ====
Year	Team	GP	GS	MPG	FG%	3P%	FT%	RPG	APG	SPG	BPG	PPG
2014–15	Milwaukee	34	**15**	10.8	.367	—	.444	1.9	.5	.1	.1	2.9
2015–16	Milwaukee	**66**	4	**13.0**	.411	**1.000**	.675	**2.7**	.5	**.3**	.1	3.0
2016–17	Denver	7	0	6.6	.467	.667	**1.000**	1.6	.3	.0	.1	2.9
2016–17	Charlotte	4	0	8.5	**.533**	.333	.500	2.0	**1.0**	.0	.0	4.5
2017–18	Charlotte	36	0	10.5	.398	.326	.840	2.6	.4	**.3**	**.2**	**4.8**
Career		147	19	11.5	.402	.360	.663	2.4	.5	.2	.1	3.5

==== Playoffs ====
Year	Team	GP	GS	MPG	FG%	3P%	FT%	RPG	APG	SPG	BPG	PPG
2015	Milwaukee	1	0	12.0	.375	—	—	3.0	.0	.0	.0	6.0
Career		1	0	12.0	.375	—	—	3.0	.0	.0	.0	6.0

=== EuroLeague ===
Year	Team	GP	GS	MPG	FG%	3P%	FT%	RPG	APG	SPG	BPG	PPG	PIR
2018–19	Maccabi	30	28	23.4	.392	.306	.786	5.9	1.3	.5	.3	10.6	9.8
Career		30	28	23.4	.392	.306	.786	5.9	1.3	.5	.3	10.6	9.8

=== Eurocup ===
Year	Team	GP	GS	MPG	FG%	3P%	FT%	RPG	APG	SPG	BPG	PPG	PIR
2019–20	Lokomotiv Kuban	10	9	26.0	.448	.345	.724	5.1	1.4	.4	.5	13.8	10.6

=== College ===
Year	Team	GP	GS	MPG	FG%	3P%	FT%	RPG	APG	SPG	BPG	PPG
2011-12	LSU	28	17	21.4	.399	.167	.625	6.7	.4	**.5**	.8	8.5
2012-13	LSU	29	27	29.1	.480	.250	.596	**8.7**	**1.7**	**.5**	.7	13.6
2013-14	LSU	**34**	**34**	**30.0**	**.494**	**.333**	**.634**	7.7	1.6	**.5**	**.9**	**15.4**
Career		91	78	27.1	.467	.222	.619	7.7	1.3	.5	.8	12.7
