= Landry Nnoko =

Cameroonian basketball player

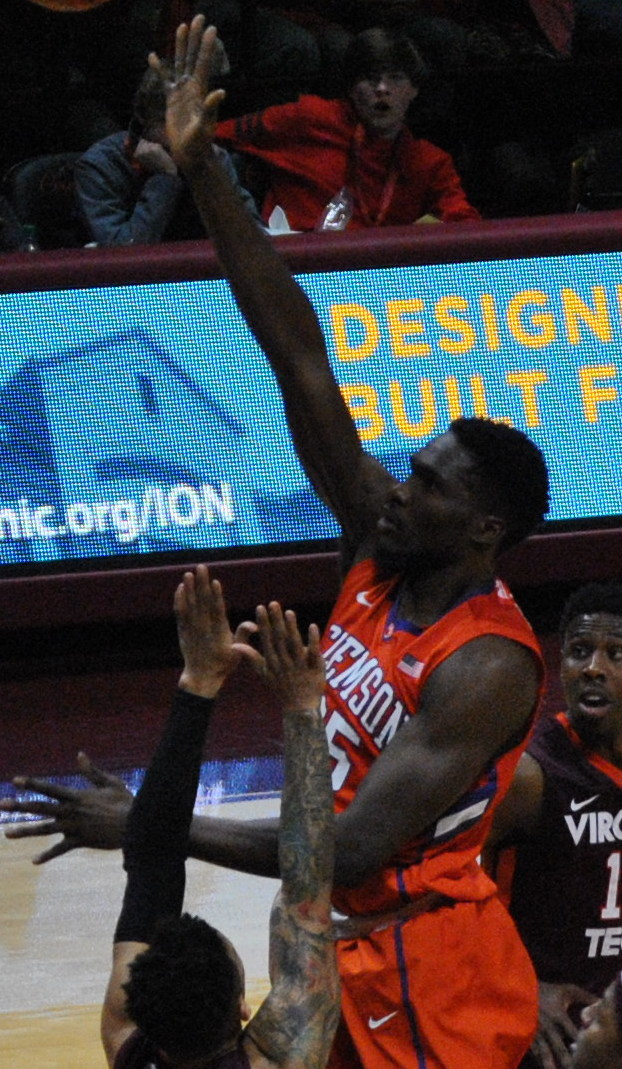
- Nnoko in college playing for Clemson

No. 56 – Zhejiang Lions
- Position: Center
- League: CBA

Personal information
- Born: April 9, 1994 (age 32) Yaoundé, Cameroon
- Listed height: 2.08 m (6 ft 10 in)
- Listed weight: 113 kg (249 lb)

Career information
- High school: Montverde Academy (Montverde, Florida)
- College: Clemson (2012–2016)
- NBA draft: 2016: undrafted
- Playing career: 2016–present

Career history
- 2016–2017: Victoria Libertas Pesaro
- 2017–2018: Grand Rapids Drive
- 2018: Sakarya BB
- 2018–2020: Alba Berlin
- 2020–2021: Crvena zvezda
- 2021–2022: Saski Baskonia
- 2022: San Pablo Burgos
- 2022: Suwon KT Sonicboom
- 2023: NBA G League Ignite
- 2023–2024: BCM Gravelines-Dunkerque
- 2024–2025: Panionios
- 2025–2026: Bursaspor
- 2026–present: Zhejiang Lions

Career highlights
- ABA League champion (2021); Serbian League champion (2021); ABA League Finals MVP (2021); Bundesliga champion (2020); German Cup winner (2020); NBA G League Defensive Player of the Year (2018); Third-team All NBA G League (2018); NBA G League All-Defensive Team (2018); ACC All-Defensive team (2016)
- Stats at Basketball Reference

Landry Christ Nnoko (born April 9, 1994) is a Cameroonian professional basketball player for the Zhejiang Lions of the Chinese Basketball Association (CBA). He played college basketball for the Clemson Tigers.

== College career ==
After coming to the U.S. to play high school basketball at Montverde Academy, Nnoko committed to Clemson for college. He played four seasons for the Tigers and was a three-year starter known primarily for his shot-blocking and defence. As a senior, Nnoko earned Atlantic Coast Conference (ACC) All-Defensive team honours and led the league in blocked shots.

== Professional career ==
Following the close of his college career, Nnoko signed with Victoria Libertas Pesaro of Italy's Serie A. He averaged 6.4 points and 7.1 rebounds per game for the 2016–17 season.

At the start of the 2017–18 season, Nnoko was signed by the Detroit Pistons of the NBA as a part of their training camp roster. After being cut in training camp, he signed with the Pistons′ NBA G League franchise, the Grand Rapids Drive. At the close of the G League season, Nnoko was named the league's Defensive Player of the Year.

On July 29, 2018, Nnoko signed with Sakarya BB of the Turkish Basketbol Süper Ligi.

In December 2018, Nnoko signed with Alba Berlin of the German Basketball Bundesliga.

On June 29, 2020, Nnoko signed with Serbian club Crvena zvezda of the ABA League. On September 6, the club discharged him for medical reasons. However, he returned to the Zvezda on December 25. He solved his health problem at the Mayo Clinic in Rochester, Minnesota and received a permit to return to basketball without any limitations.

On August 15, 2021, he has signed with Saski Baskonia of the EuroLeague and the Liga ACB. On January 4, 2021, Nnoko and Baskonia parted ways. The following day, he signed with San Pablo Burgos.

On August 1, 2022, Nnoko signed with Suwon KT Sonicboom of the Korean Basketball League. On December 19, he was replaced by Lester Prosper. In February 2023, Nnoko joined NBA G League Ignite of the NBA G League.

In August 2023, Nnoko signed with BCM Gravelines-Dunkerque of the LNB Pro A and the FIBA Europe Cup.

In July 2024, Nnoko signed with Panionios of the Basket League.

On July 30, 2025, he signed with Bursaspor Basketbol of the Basketbol Süper Ligi (BSL).

== Career statistics ==
Legend
GP	Games played	GS	Games started	MPG	Minutes per game
FG%	Field-goal percentage	3P%	3-point field-goal percentage	FT%	Free-throw percentage
RPG	Rebounds per game	APG	Assists per game	SPG	Steals per game
BPG	Blocks per game	PPG	Points per game	PIR	Performance index rating
**Bold**	Career high

=== EuroLeague ===
*	Led the league

Year	Team	GP	GS	MPG	FG%	3P%	FT%	RPG	APG	SPG	BPG	PPG	PIR
2019–20	Berlin	**28***	**24**	**22.1**	**.605**	—	**.684**	**5.8**	**.8**	.3	**.7**	**8.7**	**11.3**
2020–21	Crvena zvezda	10	6	20.8	.582	—	.583	5.1	.7	**.6**	**.7**	7.1	9.8
2021–22	Baskonia	17	7	16.8	.565	**1.000**	.591	4.5	.4	.1	.6	5.4	7.5
Career		55	37	20.2	.591	1.000	.655	5.3	.6	.3	.7	7.4	9.9

== Personal life ==
Nnoko is the cousin of NBA player Luc Mbah a Moute.
