= Aleksa Uskoković =

Serbian basketball player

No. 23 – Studentski centar
- Position: Point guard
- League: Prva A Liga; ABA League

Personal information
- Born: August 30, 1999 (age 27) Belgrade, Serbia, FR Yugoslavia
- Listed height: 1.90 m (6 ft 3 in)
- Listed weight: 86 kg (190 lb)

Career information
- NBA draft: 2021: undrafted
- Playing career: 2017–present

Career history
- 2017–2020: FMP
- 2020–2022: Crvena zvezda
- 2021–2022: →Mega Basket
- 2022–2023: Mega Basket
- 2023–2024: Borac Čačak
- 2024–2025: Dubai Basketball
- 2025–2026: Borac Čačak
- 2026–present: Studentski centar

Career highlights
- ABA League champion (2021); Serbian League champion (2021); Serbian Cup winner (2021)
Medals
Men's basketball
Representing Serbia
FIBA Europe Under-18 Championship
Gold medal – first place	2017 Slovakia	U18 Team

Aleksa Uskoković (Serbian Cyrillic: Алекса Ускоковић, born August 30, 1999) is a Serbian professional basketball player for Studentski centar of the Prva A Liga and the ABA League.

== Early career ==
Uskoković started to play basketball for the youth teams of Crvena zvezda. He played the Euroleague Basketball Next Generation Tournaments for the Crvena zvezda U18 (2015–2017). In the 2015–16 season Uskoković was included into Crvena zvezda U18 team although he was younger than the other boys. He was one of the best players at the 2016 Euroleague Adidas Next Generation Tournament in which his team reached the finals. In the following season, Uskoković helped U18 Crvena zvezda mts team to win the national championship and to qualify for the 2017 Euroleague Adidas Next Generation Tournament. He was the MVP of the Euroleague Adidas Next Generation Qualification Tournament in Belgrade.

== Professional career ==
On September 8, 2017, Uskoković signed a four-year contract with his hometown team FMP. He averaged 4.8 points and 2.7 assists per game during the 2019–20 ABA League season. On July 30, 2020, Uskoković signed a four-year contract with a Belgrade-based Crvena zvezda. On December 12, 2020, Uskoković recorded a double-double in a 111–75 win over FMP, making 10 points and 10 assists. He was loaned to Mega Basket on 30 December 2021 for the rest of the 2021–22 season. On 15 August 2022, he agreed with Mega for one-year extension.

== International career ==
Uskoković was a member and the team captain of the Serbian U-18 national basketball team that won the gold medal at the 2017 FIBA Europe Under-18 Championship. Over seven tournament games, he averaged 9.9 points, 3.1 rebounds, and 3.7 assists per game. Uskoković was a member of the Serbian under-20 team that finished 15th at the 2019 FIBA U20 European Championship in Tel Aviv, Israel. Over seven tournament games, he averaged 6.7 points, 5.3 rebounds, and 6.7 assists per game.

== Personal life ==
His younger brother, Kosta (born 2001) is a professional basketball player.
