= Nemanja Todorović =

Serbian basketball player

No. 34 – Borac Čačak
- Position: Power forward
- League: Basketball League of Serbia

Personal information
- Born: April 23, 1991 (age 35) Čačak, FR Yugoslavia
- Listed height: 2.06 m (6 ft 9 in)
- Listed weight: 92 kg (203 lb)

Career information
- NBA draft: 2013: undrafted
- Playing career: 2010–present

Career history
- 2010–2013: Borac Čačak
- 2013–2014: Konstantin
- 2014–2015: Metalac Farmakom
- 2015: Igokea
- 2015–2016: Metalac Farmakom
- 2016–2018: Borac Čačak
- 2018–2019: Lovćen
- 2019–present: Borac Čačak

Nemanja Todorović (Serbian Cyrillic: Немања Тодоровић, born 23 April 1991) is a Serbian professional basketball player for Borac Čačak of the Basketball League of Serbia. Standing at 2.06 m (6 ft 9 in), he plays at the power forward position.

== Professional career ==
Todorović began his professional career in hometown club Borac Čačak where he played from 2010 until 2013. He then signed with Niš-based club Konstantin. The 2014–15 season he played with Metalac Valjevo. He averaged 5.6 points and 1.8 rebounds in 23 games of the ABA League.

On September 12, 2015, he signed a two-year deal with the Bosnian team Igokea. He debuted for the team in 67–56 loss to Cedevita Zagreb in Round 1 of the ABA League; he contributed with 12 points and 4 rebounds. On December 9, 2015, he left Igokea for his former club Metalac Valjevo, after appearing in 12 games of the ABA League, averaging 5.6 points and 2.8 rebounds. In July 2022, he signed a two-year contract extension with Borac, where he still plays to this day.
