= Nikola Kočović =

Serbian basketball player (born 1996)

No. 8 – Pelister
- Position: Shooting guard / point guard
- League: Macedonian First League

Personal information
- Born: 17 April 1996 (age 30) Čačak, FR Yugoslavia
- Listed height: 1.97 m (6 ft 6 in)
- Listed weight: 83 kg (183 lb)

Career information
- NBA draft: 2018: undrafted
- Playing career: 2013–present

Career history
- 2013–2014: Mladost Čačak
- 2014–2015: Spartak Subotica
- 2015–2016: Metalac Valjevo
- 2016–2017: Mladost Zemun
- 2017: Vršac
- 2017–2018: Mladost Mrkonjić Grad
- 2018–2021: Borac Čačak
- 2021–2022: Mega Basket
- 2022–2024: Borac Čačak
- 2024–2025: Čačak 94
- 2025: Czarni Słupsk
- 2026–present: Pelister

Nikola Kočović (Serbian Cyrillic: Никола Кочовић; born 17 April 1996) is a Serbian professional basketball player for Pelister of the Macedonian First League. He plays as a shooting guard or point guard by position.

== Professional career ==
During his career Kočović played for Mladost Čačak, Spartak, Metalac, Mladost Zemun, Vršac, Mladost Mrkonjić Grad, and Borac Čačak.

On 15 June 2021, Kočović signed a contract with Mega Basket. On 17 September 2022, Kočović signed for Borac Čačak.

On February 24, 2025, he signed with Czarni Słupsk of the Polish Basketball League (PLK).
