= Langston Hall =

American basketball coach and player (born 1991)

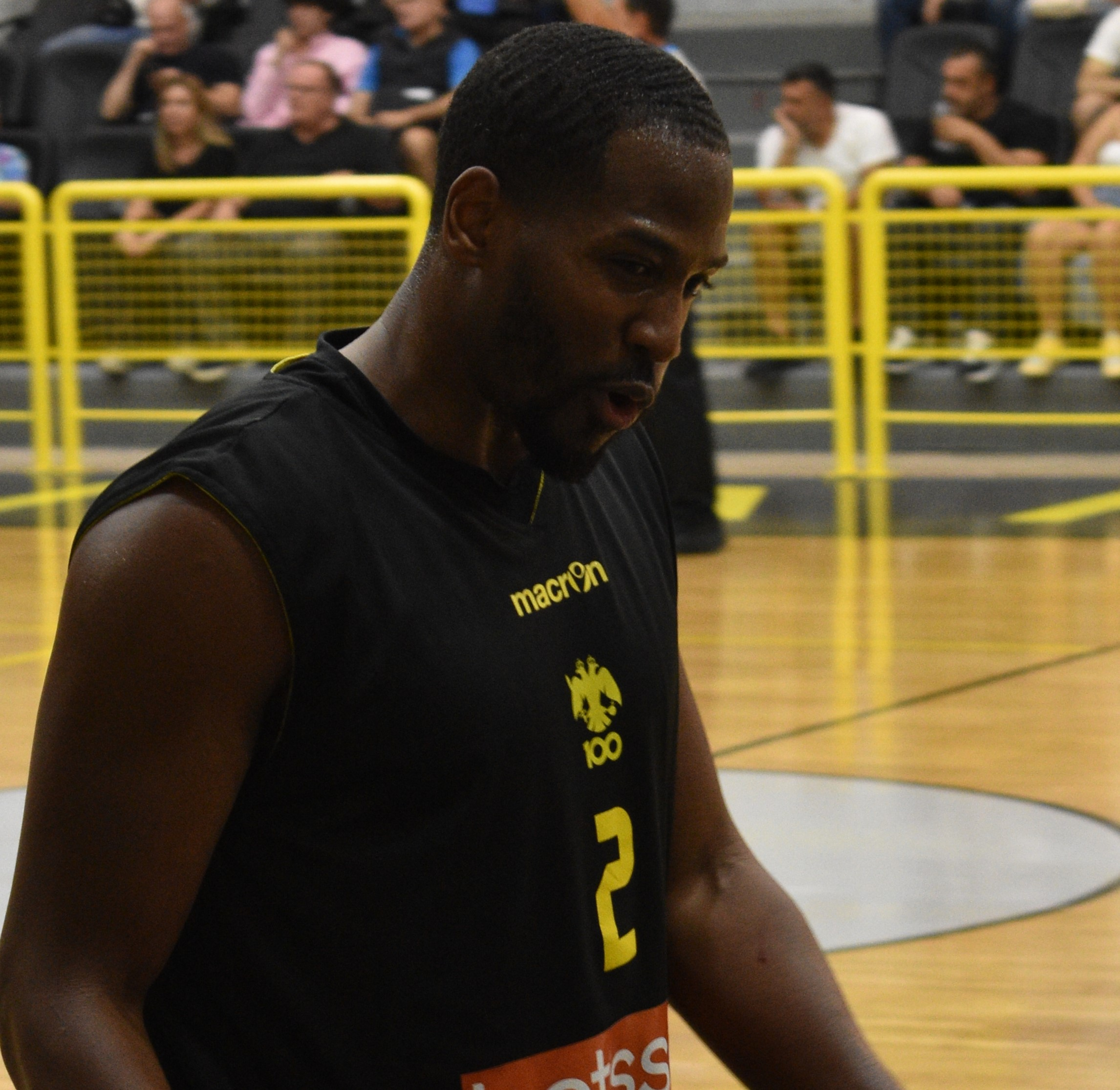
- Hall in 2023

Mercer Bears
- Title: Assistant coach
- Conference: SoCon

Personal information
- Born: November 1, 1991 (age 35) Atlanta, Georgia, U.S.
- Listed height: 6 ft 4 in (1.93 m)
- Listed weight: 180 lb (82 kg)

Career information
- High school: Chamblee (Chamblee, Georgia)
- College: Mercer (2010–2014)
- NBA draft: 2014: undrafted
- Playing career: 2014–2025
- Position: Point guard
- Coaching career: 2025–present

Career history

Playing
- 2014–2015: Pistoia
- 2015: Cantù
- 2015–2016: Bonn
- 2016–2017: Kolossos Rodou
- 2017: Cibona
- 2017–2020: Promitheas Patras
- 2020–2021: Crvena zvezda
- 2021–2023: Bahçeşehir
- 2023–2024: AEK Athens
- 2024–2025: Karditsa

Coaching
- 2025–present: Mercer (assistant)

Career highlights
- FIBA Europe Cup champion (2022); Adriatic League champion (2021); Serbian League champion (2021); Greek League All Star (2018); Atlantic Sun Player of the Year (2014); Lou Henson Award (2014); 2× First-team All-Atlantic Sun (2012, 2014); Second-team All-Atlantic Sun (2013); No. 21 retired by Mercer Bears

Langston Avery Hall (born November 1, 1991) is an American basketball coach and former player. He is currently an assistant coach for his alma mater, the Mercer Bears of the Southern Conference.

== High school career ==
Hall played high school basketball at Chamblee Charter High School, in Chamblee, Georgia.

== College career ==
Hall played college basketball at Mercer University from 2010 to 2014. During his college career, he has been selected as the Atlantic Sun Player of the Year in 2014 and he was awarded with the Lou Henson Award the same year. In 2012, he led Mercer to the CIT Tournament Championship and was named MVP of the Tournament.

In 2014, he led Mercer to their first NCAA tournament in 29 years. Mercer upset Duke for their first NCAA Tournament win in program history. Mercer lost to Tennessee in the following round in his final collegiate game.

== Professional career ==
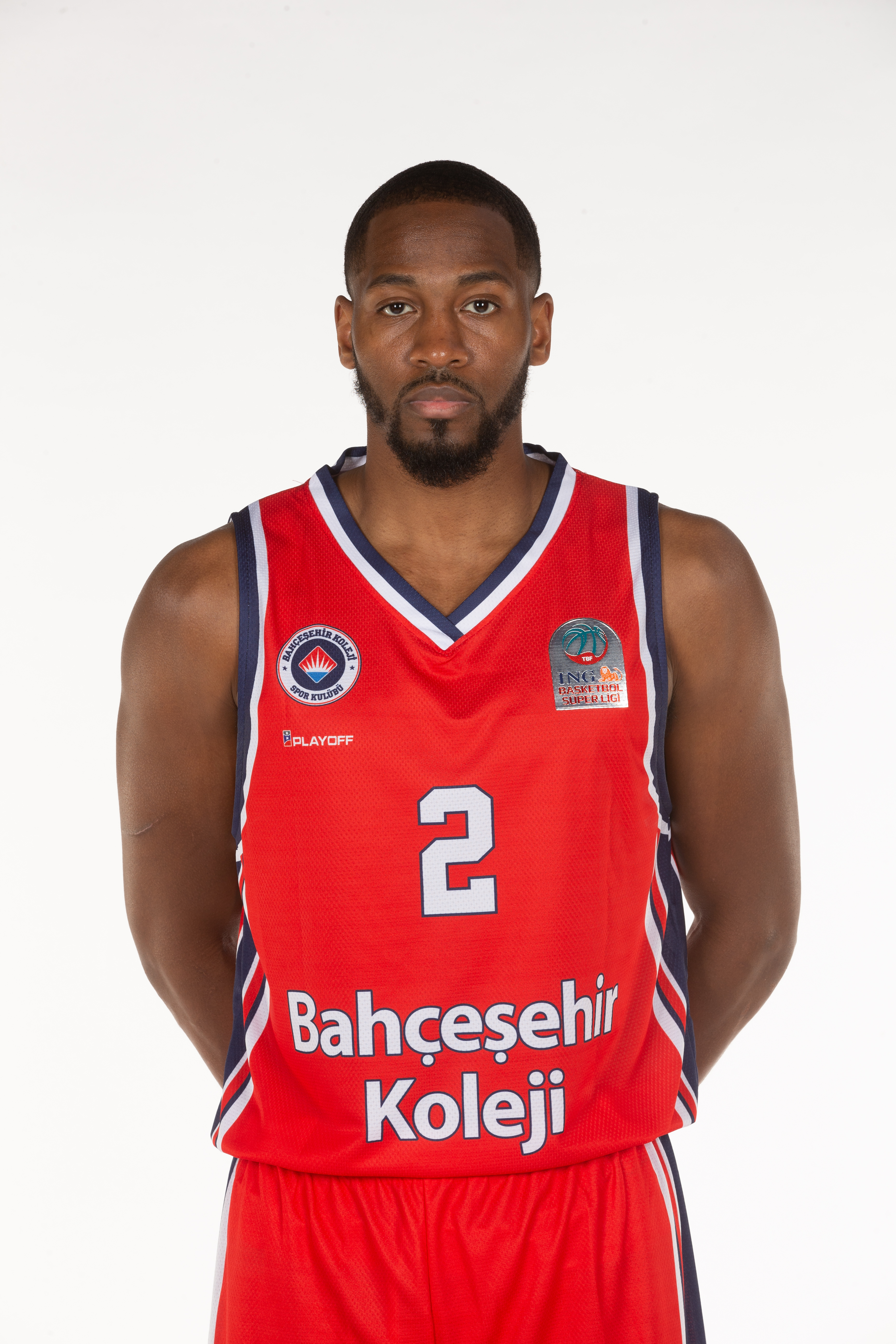
Hall with Bahçeşehir Koleji in 2021

After not being selected in the 2014 NBA draft, Hall played with the Miami Heat's team in the NBA Orlando Summer League.

On July 22, 2014, Hall signed with Giorgio Tesi Pistoia of the Lega Basket Serie A. He joined the roster with Fuquan Edwin, who played a key role for Seton Hall, only the second American on the team.

On July 1, 2015, he signed a 1+1 contract with Pallacanestro Cantù. On December 14, 2015, he parted ways with Cantù and signed with Telekom Baskets Bonn for the rest of the season.

On July 24, 2016, Hall joined Kolossos Rodou for the 2016–17 season.

On June 17, 2017, Hall signed with Croatian club Cibona for the 2017–18 season. On October 17, 2017, he parted ways with Cibona and moved to Promitheas Patras of the Greek Basket League. On July 3, 2019, Hall re-signed with Promitheas for another season.

On July 9, 2020, Hall signed with the Serbian powerhouse Crvena zvezda of the ABA League and the EuroLeague. He averaged 4.8 points and 3.4 assists per game.

On July 12, 2021, Hall signed with Bahçeşehir Koleji of the Turkish Basketball Super League (BSL).

On August 12, 2023, Hall returned to Greece for a third stint, signing with AEK Athens.

== Coaching career ==
In 2025, Hall returned to Mercer as an assistant coach.
