= 2020–21 KK Partizan season =

Serbian basketball team season

Partizan NIS Belgrade
2020–21 season
- President: (Serbia) Ostoja Mijailović
- Head coach: (Montenegro) Vlado Šćepanović (until 30 October 2020) (Serbia) Milivoje Lazić (30 October – 5 November) (Slovenia) Sašo Filipovski (5 November – 8 March) (Serbia) Aleksandar Matović (from 8 March)
- Arena: Ranko Žeravica Sports Hall
- Serbian League: Semi-finals
- ABA League: 7th
- EuroCup: Top 16
- Radivoj Korać Cup: Semi-finals
- ABA Super Cup: Canceled
- Highest home attendance: 1,027 vs Mega Soccerbet (3 June 2021)
- Biggest win: 71-43 vs Dolomiti Energia Trento (13 January 2021)
- Biggest defeat: 93-70 vs UNICS (14 October 2020)
Home	Away
- All statistics correct as of June 5, 2021.

In the 2020–21 season, Partizan NIS Belgrade competed in the Serbian League, Radivoj Korać Cup, Adriatic League and EuroCup.

It was the first season after the 1997–98 season that the club missed any league of cup final.

== Players ==
=== Current roster ===
Note: Flags indicate national team eligibility at FIBA-sanctioned events. Players may hold other non-FIBA nationalities not displayed.

Partizan NIS Belgrade roster
Players
Coaches

Pos.	No.	Nat.	Name	Ht.		Age
C	00	(United States)	Mika, Eric	2.08 m (6 ft 10 in)	111 kg (245 lb)	31 – 5 January 1995
SG	2	(United States)	Drechsel, Trey	1.98 m (6 ft 6 in)	93 kg (205 lb)	30 – 27 July 1996
SF	3	(Serbia)	Zagorac, Rade	2.06 m (6 ft 9 in)	92 kg (203 lb)	31 – 12 August 1995
PG	5	(United States)	Paige, Marcus	1.83 m (6 ft 0 in)	79 kg (174 lb)	33 – 11 September 1993
SF	6	(Serbia)	Dangubić, Nemanja	2.04 m (6 ft 8 in)	88 kg (194 lb)	33 – 13 April 1993
PF	7	(Serbia)	Stepanović, Aleksa	2.07 m (6 ft 9 in)	93 kg (205 lb)	28 – 2 June 1998
SF	8	(Serbia)	Dronjak, Vidan	1.98 m (6 ft 6 in)	92 kg (203 lb)	23 – 27 June 2003
SG	9	(Serbia)	Stefanović, Lazar	1.98 m (6 ft 6 in)	84 kg (185 lb)	24 – 27 April 2002
G	10	(Serbia)	Jaramaz, Ognjen	1.93 m (6 ft 4 in)	88 kg (194 lb)	31 – 1 September 1995
C	11	(Serbia)	Miletić, Dušan	2.12 m (6 ft 11 in)		28 – 30 July 1998
PF	12	(Serbia)	Veličković, Novica (C)	2.05 m (6 ft 9 in)	105 kg (231 lb)	39 – 5 October 1986
PG	13	(United States)	Perkins, Josh	1.91 m (6 ft 3 in)	86 kg (190 lb)	31 – 25 August 1995
C	21	(Serbia)	Janković, Nikola	2.08 m (6 ft 10 in)	103 kg (227 lb)	32 – 13 February 1994
SF	24	(Serbia)	Radovanović, Nikola	2.04 m (6 ft 8 in)	86 kg (190 lb)	23 – 13 March 2003
PF	25	(United States)	Thomas, Rashawn	2.03 m (6 ft 8 in)	104 kg (229 lb)	32 – 15 August 1994
PG	30	(Serbia)	Petrović, Mihailo	1.86 m (6 ft 1 in)	88 kg (194 lb)	23 – 23 February 2003
G	32	(Serbia)	Trifunović, Uroš	1.99 m (6 ft 6 in)	88 kg (194 lb)	25 – 5 December 2000
F	33	(Serbia)	Vukčević, Marko	2.05 m (6 ft 9 in)		23 – 6 May 2003
C	42	(United States)	Mosley, William	2.03 m (6 ft 8 in)	102 kg (225 lb)	37 – 22 June 1989

Head coach

- (Serbia) Aleksandar Matović

Assistant coach(es)

- (Serbia) Dejan Mijatović

Strength & conditioning coach(es)

- (Serbia) Vladan Radonjić

Team manager

- (Serbia) Dušan Kecman

Legend

- (C) Team captain
- (TW) Two-way affiliate player
- Injured

- Roster
- Transactions
Updated: June 25, 2021

=== Players with multiple nationalities ===
- (United States) (Serbia) Marcus Paige

=== Depth chart ===
Pos.	Starting 5	Bench 1	Bench 2	Bench 3
C	Eric Mika	Nikola Janković	Dušan Miletić	William Mosley
PF	Rashawn Thomas	Novica Veličković	Aleksa Stepanović
SF	Rade Zagorac	Nemanja Dangubić	Nikola Radovanović
SG	Ognjen Jaramaz	Uroš Trifunović	Lazar Stefanović	Trey Drechsel
PG	Josh Perkins	Marcus Paige

=== On loan ===
Partizan NIS players out on loan
Nat.	Player	Position	Team	On loan since
(Serbia)	Filip Barna	SG/SF	(Serbia) Mladost Zemun	August 2020
(Serbia)	Stefan Janković	C/PF	(Turkey) Bahçeşehir Koleji	February 2021

=== Roster changes ===
==== In ====
No.	Pos.	Nat.	Name	Moving from		Type	Date	Source
0	PG	(United States)	Codi Miller-McIntyre	Cedevita Olimpija	(Slovenia)	End of contract	1 July 2020	
2	SG	(United States)	Trey Drechsel	Mladost Zemun	(Serbia)	End of contract	5 July 2020	
6	F	(Serbia)	Nemanja Dangubić	Movistar Estudiantes	(Spain)	End of contract	10 July 2020	
00	C	(United States)	Eric Mika	Stockton Kings	(United States)	End of contract	24 August 2020	
13	PG	(United States)	Josh Perkins	GTK Gliwice	(Poland)	Transfer	4 January 2021	
7	PF	(Serbia)	Aleksa Stepanović	Sloboda Užice	(Serbia)	Free Transfer	24 May 2021	

==== Out ====
No.	Pos.	Nat.	Name	Moving to		Type	Date	Source
31	G/F	(Latvia)	Žanis Peiners	Free agent		End of contract	6 June 2020	
8	C	(United States)	James McAdoo	Sun Rockers Shibuya	(Japan)	End of contract	24 June 2020	
15	G/F	(United States)	Reggie Redding	Free agent		End of contract	June 2020	
2	SG	(United States)	Corey Walden	Crvena zvezda mts	(Serbia)	Transfer	27 June 2020	
14	PF	(Serbia)	Stefan Birčević	Borac Čačak	(Serbia)	End of contract	16 December 2020	
11	C	(Serbia)	Dušan Miletić	Borac Čačak	(Serbia)	Free Transfer	19 September 2020	
20	C	(Serbia)	Dušan Tanasković	Mladost Zemun	(Serbia)	Free Transfer	22 September 2020	
11	SG	(Colombia)	Braian Angola	Ironi Nes Ziona	(Israel)	End of contract	18 November 2020	
7	PG	(Bosnia and Herzegovina)	Nemanja Gordić	Mornar Bar	(Montenegro)	Free Transfer	27 December 2020	
77	PG	(Slovenia)	Aleksej Nikolić	BCM Gravelines-Dunkerque	(France)	Free Transfer	24 February 2021	
0	PG	(United States)	Codi Miller-McIntyre	JL Bourg	(France)	Free Transfer	27 February 2021	

== Pre-season and friendlies ==
Win Loss

29 August 2020	Sloga (Serbia)	53–76	(Serbia) Partizan	Kraljevo
18:30	Scoring by quarter: 10–22, 16–15, 14–25
	Pts: not available Rebs: not available Asts: not available	Report	Pts: N.Janković 15; Rebs: not available Asts: not available	Arena: Sportski centar Ibar; Attendance: 50

3 September 2020	Partizan (Serbia)	81–62	(Serbia) Dynamic	Belgrade
18:00	Scoring by quarter: 20–22, 17–18, 27–17
	Pts: Zagorac 15; Rebs: S.Janković 9 Asts: Gordić 5	Report	Pts: Glas 16; Rebs: Paunović 10; Asts: Akay 6	Arena: Ranko Žeravica Sports Hall; Attendance: 0

5 September 2020	Partizan (Serbia)	76–58	(Serbia) Sloboda Užice	Belgrade
18:00	Scoring by quarter: 22–12, 10–15, 26–15
	Pts: Miller-McIntyre, Trifunović 14; Rebs: not available Asts: not available	Report	Pts: Tadić 16; Rebs: not available Asts: not available	Arena: Ranko Žeravica Sports Hall; Attendance: 0

8 September 2020	Partizan (Serbia)	82–78	(Romania) U-BT Cluj-Napoca	Belgrade
19:00	Scoring by quarter: 22–18, 18–12, 20–22
	Pts: Gordić 14; Rebs: not available Asts: not available	Report	Pts: Tarolis 17; Rebs: not available Asts: not available	Arena: Ranko Žeravica Sports Hall; Attendance: 0

10 September 2020	Partizan (Serbia)	82–72	(Romania) U-BT Cluj-Napoca	Belgrade
18:00	'Scoring by quarter: 23–19, 17–24, 20–15
	Pts: Miller-McIntyre 17; Rebs: not available Asts: not available	Report	Pts: Tarolis 21; Rebs: not available Asts: not available	Arena: Ranko Žeravica Sports Hall; Attendance: 0

12 September 2020	Partizan (Serbia)	71–66	(Serbia) Borac Čačak	Belgrade
17:00	'Scoring by quarter: 17–22, 20–20, 18–10
	Pts: Paige 12; Rebs: not available Asts: not available	Report	Pts: Đoković 12; Rebs: not available Asts: not available	Arena: Ranko Žeravica Sports Hall; Attendance: 0

16 September 2020	Partizan (Serbia)	68–73	(Montenegro) Mornar	Belgrade
18:00	'Scoring by quarter: 19–17, 11–11, 15–22
	Pts: Paige 12; Rebs: Thomas 6 Asts: Miller-McIntyre 6	Report	Pts: Pullen 15; Rebs: not available Asts: not available	Arena: Ranko Žeravica Sports Hall; Attendance: 0

22 April 2021	Partizan (Serbia)	81–76	(Serbia) Vojvodina	Belgrade
18:00	Scoring by quarter: 21–15, 21–28, 16–17
	Pts: Thomas 21; Rebs: not available Asts: not available	Report	Pts: Rakićević 26; Rebs: not available Asts: not available	Arena: Ranko Žeravica Sports Hall; Attendance: 0

12 May 2021	Vojvodina (Serbia)	61–82	(Serbia) Partizan	Novi Sad
18:00	Scoring by quarter: 9–23, 15–13, 16–20
	Pts: Gaćeša 18; Rebs: not available Asts: not available	Report	Pts: Trifunović 19; Rebs: not available Asts: not available	Arena: SPC Vojvodina; Attendance: 0

15 May 2021	Zlatibor (Serbia)	59–76	(Serbia) Partizan	Čajetina
18:00
				Arena: Čajetina Sports Hall; Attendance: 0

19 May 2021	Borac Čačak (Serbia)	84–79	(Serbia) Partizan	Čačak
18:00	Scoring by quarter: 23–18, 26–21, 13–14
	Pts: Miletić 21; Rebs: Miletić 10; Asts: not available	Report	Pts: Perkins 17; Rebs: not available Asts: not available	Arena: Borac Hall; Attendance: 0

== Adriatic League ==
=== Regular season ===
Pos	Team	Pld	W	L	PF	PA	PD	Pts
5	(Slovenia) Cedevita Olimpija	26	18	8	2116	1947	+169	44
6	(Serbia) Mega Soccerbet	26	14	12	1996	1955	+41	40
7	(Serbia) Partizan NIS	26	13	13	2003	1903	+100	39
8	(Serbia) FMP	26	11	15	2049	2135	−86	37
9	(Croatia) Cibona	26	10	16	1897	1998	−101	36

Source: ABA League

=== Matches ===
Win Loss

3 October 2020 1	Partizan (Serbia)	78–87	(Serbia) Borac Čačak	Belgrade
21:00	Scoring by quarter: 17–24, 19–25, 21–19, 21–19
Arena Sport	Pts: Jaramaz 21; Rebs: Thomas 6 Asts: Jaramaz, Gordić, Miller-McIntyre 3 PIR: Jaramaz 19	Report	Pts: Đoković 12; Rebs: Nerandžić 10; Asts: Kočović 5 PIR: Nerandžić, Miletić 16	Arena: Ranko Žeravica Sports Hall; Attendance: 30; Referees: Marko Juras, Uroš Nikolić, Ivan Stefanović

10 October 2020 2	Partizan (Serbia)	99–101(OT)	(Montenegro) Budućnost VOLI	Belgrade
20:00	Scoring by quarter: 20–22, 21–24, 19–17, 18–15, Overtime: 13–15
Arena Sport, B92	Pts: Jaramaz 24; Rebs: S.Janković 7 Asts: Jaramaz 7 PIR: Jaramaz 25	Report	Pts: Cobbs 27; Rebs: Reed 9 Asts: Cobbs 8 PIR: Cobbs 30	Arena: Ranko Žeravica Sports Hall; Attendance: 30; Referees: Saša Pukl, Matej Boltauzer, Tomislav Hordov

17 October 2020 3	FMP (Serbia)	90–103	(Serbia) Partizan	Belgrade
21:00	Scoring by quarter: 23–21, 21–27, 22–29, 24–26
Arena Sport	Pts: Nenadić 26; Rebs: Pecarski 7 Asts: Čović 9 PIR: Nenadić 29	Report	Pts: Miller-McIntyre 23; Rebs: Zagorac 6 Asts: Miller-McIntyre, Gordić 4 PIR: Miller-McIntyre 26	Arena: Železnik Hall; Referees: Uroš Nikolić, Mario Majkić, Milan Nedović

25 October 2020 4	Partizan (Serbia)	86–77	(Slovenia) Cedevita Olimpija	Belgrade
19:00	Scoring by quarter: 16–19, 22–21, 26–24, 22–13
Arena Sport, B92	Pts: Miller-McIntyre 17; Rebs: Thomas 12; Asts: Gordić 7 PIR: Thomas 21	Report	Pts: Blažič 24; Rebs: Hopkins 13; Asts: Perry 5 PIR: Blažič 29	Arena: Ranko Žeravica Sports Hall; Referees: Tomislav Hordov, Miloš Koljenšić, Josip Radojković

31 October 2020 5	Igokea (Bosnia and Herzegovina)	90–84(OT)	(Serbia) Partizan	Laktaši
20:00	Scoring by quarter: 26–21, 19–22, 14–12, 20–24, Overtime: 11–5
Arena Sport	Pts: Carmichael 27; Rebs: Jošilo 9 Asts: Clemmons 11; PIR: Carmichael 29	Report	Pts: Gordić 19; Rebs: Mika 6 Asts: Miller-McIntyre 4 PIR: Zagorac 16	Arena: Laktaši Sports Hall; Referees: Marko Juras, Dragan Porobić, Aleksandar Milojević

7 November 2020 6	Partizan (Serbia)	78–63	(Croatia) Zadar	Belgrade
21:00	Scoring by quarter: 19–16, 19–18, 22–16, 18–13
Arena Sport	Pts: N.Janković, Dangubić 15; Rebs: Thomas 9 Asts: Paige 6 PIR: Gordić, Dangubić 17	Report	Pts: Mavra, Onuaku 13; Rebs: Vuković 7 Asts: Mavra 7 PIR: Mavra 24	Arena: Ranko Žeravica Sports Hall; Referees: Ilija Belošević, Tomislav Vovk, Radoš Savović

14 November 2020 7	Cibona (Croatia)	75–82	(Serbia) Partizan	Zagreb
17:00	Scoring by quarter: 21–27, 19–23, 25–17, 10–15
Arena Sport, B92	Pts: Bundović 20; Rebs: Prkačin 10; Asts: Moore 5 PIR: Prkačin 27	Report	Pts: Paige 16; Rebs: N.Janković 12; Asts: Gordić 10; PIR: N.Janković 24	Arena: Dražen Petrović Basketball Hall; Attendance: 25; Referees: Damir Javor, Igor Dragojević, Josip Radojković

23 November 2020 8	Partizan (Serbia)	85–86	(Serbia) Crvena zvezda mts	Belgrade
21:00	Scoring by quarter: 19–22, 21–28, 25–24, 20–12
Arena Sport, B92	Pts: Thomas 19; Rebs: Thomas, Mosley 6 Asts: Gordić 6 PIR: Thomas, Mosley 24	Report	Pts: Loyd 18; Rebs: Terry 9 Asts: Hall 5 PIR: Walden 14	Arena: Ranko Žeravica Sports Hall; Referees: Sreten Radović, Matej Boltauzer, Sašo Petek

5 December 2020 9	Mornar (Montenegro)	77–76(OT)	(Serbia) Partizan	Bar
19:00	Scoring by quarter: 15–22, 18–17, 21–12, 16–19, Overtime: 7–6
Arena Sport	Pts: Pullen 19; Rebs: Smith 7 Asts: Needham, Whitehead 4 PIR: Whitehead 17	Report	Pts: Miller-McIntyre 21; Rebs: Thomas 13; Asts: Miller-McIntyre 4 PIR: Miller-McIntyre 28	Arena: Topolica Sport Hall; Referees: Damir Javor, Milan Nedović, Luka Kardum

12 December 2020 10	Partizan (Serbia)	79–77	(Serbia) Mega Soccerbet	Belgrade
19:00	Scoring by quarter: 16–27, 24–23, 16–15, 23–12
Arena Sport, B92	Pts: Miller-McIntyre 22; Rebs: Mosley 9 Asts: Jaramaz 3 PIR: Miller-McIntyre 20	Report	Pts: Petrušev 23; Rebs: Petrušev 10; Asts: Novak 5 PIR: Petrušev 26	Arena: Ranko Žeravica Sports Hall; Referees: Uroš Obrknežević, Marko Juras, Vladimir Vesković

19 December 2020 11	Krka (Slovenia)	69–50	(Serbia) Partizan	Novo Mesto
17:00	Scoring by quarter: 22–10, 17–14, 13–8, 17–18
Arena Sport	Pts: Camphor 16; Rebs: Stipčević 7 Asts: Stipčević 5 PIR: Stipčević 20	Report	Pts: Miller-McIntyre 12; Rebs: Mosley, Thomas 6 Asts: Miller-McIntyre, Jaramaz 2 PIR: Thomas 12	Arena: Leon Štukelj Hall; Referees: Sreten Radović, Josip Radojković, Bojan Kruljac

26 December 2020 12	Koper Primorska (Slovenia)	0–20	(Serbia) Partizan	Koper
19:00
Arena Sport		Report		Arena: Arena Bonifika
Note: The match was not played due to the Koper Primoprska disqualification from the competition.

3 January 2021 13	Split (Croatia)	74–86	(Serbia) Partizan	Split
17:00	Scoring by quarter: 21–24, 21–24, 22–22, 10–16
Arena Sport, B92	Pts: Luković 18; Rebs: Luković 8 Asts: Luković 4 PIR: Luković 26	Report	Pts: Jaramaz 29; Rebs: Mosley, Mika 7 Asts: Miller-McIntyre 4 PIR: Jaramaz 33	Arena: Arena Gripe; Attendance: 1 Referees: Igor Dragojević, Radoš Savović, Ernad Karović

9 January 2021 14	Borac Čačak (Serbia)	75–71	(Serbia) Partizan	Čačak
17:00	Scoring by quarter: 19–15, 19–18, 22–17, 15–21
Arena Sport, B92	Pts: Kočović 17; Rebs: Novaković 8 Asts: Đoković 5 PIR: Kočović 24	Report	Pts: Dangubić 13; Rebs: Mosley, Thomas 8 Asts: Jaramaz, Miller-McIntyre 4 PIR: Mosley 13	Arena: Borac Hall; Referees: Ilija Belošević, Ivan Stefanović, Vladimir Vesković

16 January 2021 15	Budućnost VOLI (Montenegro)	80–72	(Serbia) Partizan	Podgorica
18:00	Scoring by quarter: 20–21, 21–15, 13–18, 26–18
Arena Sport, B92	Pts: Ivanović 25; Rebs: Reed 7 Asts: Ivanović, Apić 3 PIR: Ivanović 29	Report	Pts: Zagorac 14; Rebs: Mosley 7 Asts: Miller-McIntyre 4 PIR: Zagorac 15	Arena: Morača Sports Center; Referees: Sašo Petek, Mario Majkić, Denis Hadžić

8 April 2021 16	Partizan (Serbia)	97–74	(Serbia) FMP	Belgrade
16:00	Scoring by quarter: 21–13, 28–14, 26–26, 22–21
Arena Sport	Pts: Trifunović 22; Rebs: Dangubić 5 Asts: Perkins 10; PIR: Trifunović 20	Report	Pts: Pecarski 16; Rebs: Pecarski 7 Asts: Nenadić, Vasić 4 PIR: Pecarski, Lazarević 19	Arena: Ranko Žeravica Sports Hall; Referees: Marko Juras, Aleksandar Milojević, Vladimir Vesković
Note: The game was originally scheduled to be played on 23 January. Partizan requested the suspension of the game due to local legislation imposing quarantine measures on the team. Afterwards, the game was rescheduled to 8 Аpril.

30 January 2021 17	Cedevita Olimpija (Slovenia)	78–65	(Serbia) Partizan	Ljubljana
19:00	Scoring by quarter: 22–18, 18–19, 22–18, 16–10
Arena Sport, B92	Pts: Blažič 28; Rebs: Hopkins 9 Asts: Blažič, Perry, Rupnik 3 PIR: Blažič 30	Report	Pts: Jaramaz 15; Rebs: Thomas 7 Asts: N.Janković, Paige 2 PIR: Jaramaz 16	Arena: Arena Stožice; Referees: Tomislav Hordov, Igor Dragojević, Miloš Koljenšić

6 February 2021 18	Partizan (Serbia)	75–83	(Bosnia and Herzegovina) Igokea	Belgrade
19:00	Scoring by quarter: 16–23, 20–19, 26–21, 13–20
Arena Sport	Pts: Thomas 18; Rebs: Mosley 8 Asts: Paige 7 PIR: Thomas 23	Report	Pts: Clemmons, Jošilo, Ilić 16; Rebs: Carmichael 5 Asts: Atić 6 PIR: Jošilo 25	Arena: Ranko Žeravica Sports Hall; Referees: Josip Radojković, Mario Majkić, Vladimir Vesković

27 February 2021 19	Zadar (Croatia)	96–94(OT)	(Serbia) Partizan	Zadar
17:00	Scoring by quarter: 19–17, 22–20, 20–18, 22–28, Overtime: 13–11
Arena Sport, B92	Pts: Mavra 20; Rebs: Vuković 7 Asts: Vuković 6 PIR: Mavra, Vuković 24	Report	Pts: Thomas 24; Rebs: Thomas 9 Asts: Jaramaz 7 PIR: Thomas 28	Arena: Krešimir Ćosić Hall; Attendance: 1 Referees: Miloš Koljenšić, Mario Majkić, Milan Nedović

6 March 2021 20	Partizan (Serbia)	87–90(OT)	(Croatia) Cibona	Belgrade
19:00	Scoring by quarter: 19–24, 17–13, 23–21, 21–22, Overtime: 7–10
Arena Sport	Pts: Trifunović 20; Rebs: N.Janković 7 Asts: Jaramaz 6 PIR: Trifunović 25	Report	Pts: Prkačin, Nakić 23; Rebs: Prkačin 9 Asts: Radovčić 5 PIR: Nakić 28	Arena: Ranko Žeravica Sports Hall; Referees: Milivoje Jovčić, Ernard Karović, Ivan Stefanović

14 March 2021 21	Crvena zvezda mts (Serbia)	73–64	(Serbia) Partizan	Belgrade
19:30	'Scoring by quarter: 15–14, 26–20, 16–16, 16–14
Arena Sport, B92	Pts: Reath 15; Rebs: Reath 7 Asts: Loyd 6 PIR: Loyd 18	Report	Pts: Thomas 17; Rebs: Thomas 14; Asts: N.Janković 4 PIR: Thomas 26	Arena: Aleksandar Nikolić Hall; Referees: Saša Pukl, Igor Dragojević, Sašo Petek

20 March 2021 22	Partizan (Serbia)	83–75	(Montenegro) Mornar	Belgrade
17:00	Scoring by quarter: 18–16, 24–20, 20–20, 21–19
Arena Sport	Pts: Thomas 18; Rebs: Thomas 13; Asts: Jaramaz 6 PIR: Thomas 27	Report	Pts: Smith 15; Rebs: Hamilton 5 Asts: Needham 7 PIR: Smith 20	Arena: Ranko Žeravica Sports Hall; Referees: Josip Radojković, Luka Kardum, Krunoslav Peić

28 March 2021 23	Mega Soccerbet (Serbia)	88–98	(Serbia) Partizan	Belgrade
12:00	Scoring by quarter: 23–30, 32–23, 15–22, 18–23
Arena Sport, B92	Pts: Petrušev 21; Rebs: Petrušev 9 Asts: Smith 8 PIR: Petrušev 26	Report	Pts: Jaramaz 22; Rebs: Thomas 12; Asts: Jaramaz 6 PIR: Jaramaz 29	Arena: Ranko Žeravica Sports Hall; Referees: Saša Pukl, Luka Kardum, Matej Špendl

3 April 2021 24	Partizan (Serbia)	91–67	(Slovenia) Krka	Belgrade
21:00	Scoring by quarter: 16–11, 25–22, 31–20, 19–14
Arena Sport	Pts: Thomas 17; Rebs: Thomas 5 Asts: Thomas 6 PIR: Thomas 29	Report	Pts: Škifić, Camphor 13; Rebs: Škifić 4 Asts: Stipčević 5 PIR: Stipčević 13	Arena: Ranko Žeravica Sports Hall; Attendance: 30; Referees: Denis Hadžić, Tomislav Vovk, Radoš Arsenijević

9 April 2021 25	Partizan (Serbia)	20–0	(Slovenia) Koper Primorska	Belgrade
Arena Sport		Report		Arena: Ranko Žeravica Sports Hall
Note: The game will not be played due to the Koper Primoprska disqualification from the competition.

26 April 2021 26	Partizan (Serbia)	80–58	(Croatia) Split	Belgrade
16:00	'Scoring by quarter: 26–13, 16–8, 19–22, 19–15
Arena Sport	Pts: Jaramaz, Paige 13; Rebs: Thomas 9 Asts: Jaramaz, Paige 4 PIR: Thomas 17	Report	Pts: Babić 13; Rebs: Babić 7 Asts: Čampara 4 PIR: Babić 19	Arena: Ranko Žeravica Sports Hall; Attendance: 50; Referees: Milan Nedović, Krunoslav Peić, Aleksandar Milojević

== EuroCup ==
=== Regular season ===
==== Group B ====
Pos	Team	Pld	W	L	PF	PA	PD	Qualification
1	(Spain) Joventut	10	8	2	849	783	+66	Advance to Top 16
2	(Russia) UNICS	10	6	4	827	797	+30	Advance to Top 16
3	(France) JL Bourg	10	6	4	810	777	+33	Advance to Top 16
4	(Serbia) Partizan NIS	10	6	4	810	784	+26	Advance to Top 16
5	(Turkey) Bahçeşehir Koleji	10	2	8	810	827	−17	
6	(Italy) Umana Reyer Venezia	10	2	8	744	882	−138	

Source: EuroCup Basketball
Rules for classification: All points scored in extra period(s) were not counted in the standings, nor for any tie-break situation.

==== Matches ====
Win Loss

30 September 2020 1	Club Joventut Badalona (Spain)	85–82	(Serbia) Partizan	Badalona
20:45	Scoring by quarter: 21–17, 19–31, 21–23, 24–11
Sport Klub	Pts: Ribas 18; Rebs: Brodzianskys 9 Asts: Bassas 7 PIR: Ribas 20	Boxscore	Pts: Thomas 15; Rebs: Thomas 8 Asts: Thomas 4 PIR: Thomas 21	Arena: Pavelló Olímpic; Attendance: 1,045; Referees: Robert Lottermoser, Rain Peerandi, Hugues Thépenier

6 October 2020 2	Partizan (Serbia)	95–73	(Italy) Umana Reyer Venezia	Belgrade
20:30	Scoring by quarter: 23–23, 19–20, 33–15, 20–15
Sport Klub	Pts: Thomas 22; Rebs: Mosley 7 Asts: Miller-McIntyre 6 PIR: Thomas 28	Boxscore	Pts: Watt 16; Rebs: Chappell 5 Asts: Stone 4 PIR: Watt 15	Arena: Ranko Žeravica Sports Hall; Attendance: 0 Referees: Christos Christodoulou, Mehdi Difallah, Kristaps Konstantinovs

14 October 2020 3	UNICS (Russia)	93–70	(Serbia) Partizan	Kazan
18:00	Scoring by quarter: 22–13, 15–19, 30–21, 26–17
Sport Klub	Pts: Canaan 23; Rebs: Brown 9 Asts: Smith 7 PIR: Morgan 27	Boxscore	Pts: N.Janković 12; Rebs: Dangubić 6 Asts: Miller-McIntyre 4 PIR: Miller-McIntyre 15	Arena: Basket-Hall Kazan; Attendance: 2,221; Referees: Carmelo Paternicò, Tomislav Hordov, Stanislav Valeev

20 October 2020 4	Bahçeşehir Koleji (Turkey)	76–82	(Serbia) Partizan	Istanbul
18:00	Scoring by quarter: 17–24, 22–14, 17–21, 20–23
Sport Klub	Pts: Green 23; Rebs: Jones 8 Asts: Green 3 PIR: Green 30	Boxscore	Pts: Miller-McIntyre 22; Rebs: Thomas 9 Asts: Miller-McIntyre 7 PIR: Miller-McIntyre 28	Arena: BJK Akatlar Arena; Attendance: 0 Referees: Daniel Hierrezuelo, Eduard Udyanskyy, Denis Hadžić

28 October 2020 5	Partizan (Serbia)	76–89	(France) JL Bourg	Belgrade
20:30	Scoring by quarter: 19–22, 21–35, 18–17, 18–15
Sport Klub	Pts: Gordić 15; Rebs: Thomas 8 Asts: Gordić, Miller-McIntyre 4 PIR: Gordić 15	Boxscore	Pts: Pelos 28; Rebs: Pelos 7 Asts: Allen, Anđušić 4 PIR: Pelos 33	Arena: Ranko Žeravica Sports Hall; Attendance: 0 Referees: Elias Koromilas, Mykola Ambrosov, Sinan Isguder

19 November 2020 6	Partizan (Serbia)	78–75	(Spain) Club Joventut Badalona	Belgrade
20:30	Scoring by quarter: 18–19, 23–14, 22–16, 15–26
Sport Klub	Pts: Gordić 16; Rebs: Thomas, Trifunović 5 Asts: Gordić 4 PIR: Gordić 21	Boxscore	Pts: Dawson 19; Rebs: Birgander 5 Asts: Bassas 11; PIR: Brodziansky 20	Arena: Ranko Žeravica Sports Hall; Attendance: 0 Referees: Ioannis Foufis, Jurgis Laurinavicius, Stanislav Valeev
Note: The game was originally scheduled to be played on 4 November. Joventut Badalona requested the suspension of the game due to local legislation imposing quarantine measures on the team. Afterwards, the game was rescheduled to 19 November.

29 December 2020 7	Umana Reyer Venezia (Italy)	59–79	(Serbia) Partizan	Venice
20:30	Scoring by quarter: 18–11, 15–16, 12–28, 14–24
Sport Klub	Pts: Watt 21; Rebs: Fotu 7 Asts: Watt, Casarin, Tonut, De Nicolao 3 PIR: Watt 29	Boxscore	Pts: Thomas 17; Rebs: Mosley 8 Asts: Miller-McIntyre 6 PIR: Thomas 23	Arena: Palasport Giuseppe Taliercio; Attendance: 0 Referees: Juan Carlos Garcia, Sašo Petek, Hüseyin Çelik
Note: The game was originally scheduled to be played on 11 November. Reyer Venezia requested the suspension of the game due to local legislation imposing quarantine measures on the team. Afterwards, the game was rescheduled to 29 December.

17 November 2020 8	Partizan (Serbia)	89–86	(Russia) UNICS	Belgrade
20:30	Scoring by quarter: 20–26, 20–13, 23–21, 26–26
Sport Klub	Pts: Paige 25; Rebs: Zagorac 8 Asts: Miller-McIntyre, Zagorac, Gordić 4 PIR: Paige 23	Boxscore	Pts: Canaan 19; Rebs: Morgan 7 Asts: Smith 6 PIR: Brown 23	Arena: Ranko Žeravica Sports Hall; Attendance: 0 Referees: Christos Christodoulou, Rain Peerandi, Kristaps Konstantinovs

9 December 2020 9	Partizan (Serbia)	88–75	(Turkey) Bahçeşehir Koleji	Belgrade
20:30	Scoring by quarter: 25–17, 17–20, 17–21, 29–17
Sport Klub	Pts: Thomas 18; Rebs: Thomas, Mosley 6 Asts: Miller-McIntyre 5 PIR: Thomas 25	Boxscore	Pts: Green 25; Rebs: Robinson, Yılmaz 6 Asts: Green 6 PIR: Green 28	Arena: Ranko Žeravica Sports Hall; Attendance: 0 Referees: Damir Javor, Carmelo Paternicò, Mykola Ambrosov

15 December 2020 10	JL Bourg (France)	73–71	(Serbia) Partizan	Bourg-en-Bresse
20:45	Scoring by quarter: 21–26, 19–15, 16–18, 17–12
Sport Klub	Pts: Anđušić 17; Rebs: Omić 7 Asts: Benitez 4 PIR: Pelos 18	Boxscore	Pts: Thomas 15; Rebs: Mosley 7 Asts: Miller-McIntyre 6 PIR: Thomas 24	Arena: Ekinox; Attendance: 0 Referees: Aare Halliko, Saulius Racys, Denis Hadžić

=== Top 16: Group F ===
Pos	Team	Pld	W	L	PF	PA	PD	Qualification
1	(France) Metropolitans 92	6	4	2	435	441	−6	Advance to quarterfinals
2	(Russia) Lokomotiv Kuban	6	3	3	489	464	+25	Advance to quarterfinals
3	(Italy) Dolomiti Energia Trento	6	3	3	441	446	−5	
4	(Serbia) Partizan NIS	6	2	4	395	409	−14	

Source: EuroCup Basketball
Rules for classification: All points scored in extra period(s) were not counted in the standings, nor for any tie-break situation.

==== Matches ====
Win Loss

13 January 2021 1	Partizan (Serbia)	71–43	(Italy) Dolomiti Energia Trento	Belgrade
20:30	Scoring by quarter: 24–16, 11–4, 19–10, 17–13
Sport Klub	Pts: Mosley 12; Rebs: Miller-McIntyre 8 Asts: Perkins 6 PIR: Mosley 22	Boxscore	Pts: Williams 15; Rebs: Williams 8 Asts: Browne 5 PIR: Williams 17	Arena: Ranko Žeravica Sports Hall; Attendance: 124; Referees: Carlos Peruga, Amit Balak, Sinan Isguder

19 January 2021 2	Metropolitans 92 (France)	79–62	(Serbia) Partizan	Levallois-Perret
20:45	Scoring by quarter: 22–11, 16–19, 23–16, 18–16
Sport Klub	Pts: Michineau 16; Rebs: Roos 8 Asts: Stoll 5 PIR: Roos 22	Boxscore	Pts: Miller-McIntyre, Zagorac 14; Rebs: Miller-McIntyre, Mosley 5 Asts: Paige 4 PIR: Mosley 20	Arena: Palais des sports Marcel-Cerdan; Attendance: 0 Referees: Elias Koromilas, Jordi Aliaga, Sebastien Clivaz

27 January 2021 3	Lokomotiv Kuban (Russia)	74–67	(Serbia) Partizan	Krasnodar
17:30	Scoring by quarter: 19–17, 18–13, 17–19, 20–18
Sport Klub	Pts: Cummings 15; Rebs: Hervey, Lynch 5 Asts: Cummings, Kalnietis 4 PIR: Cummings 15	Boxscore	Pts: Veličković 15; Rebs: Dangubić 7 Asts: Jaramaz 6 PIR: Veličković 16	Arena: Basket-Hall Krasnodar; Attendance: 1,235; Referees: Miguel Ángel Pérez, Ioannis Foufis, Jurgis Laurinavičius

3 February 2021 4	Partizan (Serbia)	71–69	(Russia) Lokomotiv Kuban	Belgrade
20:30	Scoring by quarter: 22–24, 13–24, 17–8, 19–13
Sport Klub	Pts: Thomas 23; Rebs: Thomas 8 Asts: Jaramaz, Perkins 4 PIR: Thomas 24	Boxscore	Pts: Crawford 16; Rebs: Hervey 12; Asts: Motovilov; PIR: Hervey 20	Arena: Ranko Žeravica Sports Hall; Attendance: 0 Referees: Christos Christodoulou, Joseph Bissang, Eduard Udyanskyy

3 March 2021 5	Dolomiti Energia Trento (Italy)	69–54	(Serbia) Partizan	Trento
20:00	Scoring by quarter: 15–19, 14–9, 25–8, 15–18
Sport Klub	Pts: Williams 16; Rebs: Martin 7 Asts: Browne 7 PIR: Williams 22	Boxscore	Pts: Thomas 17; Rebs: Janković 10; Asts: Jaramaz 5 PIR: Janković 14	Arena: PalaTrento; Attendance: 0 Referees: Robert Lottermose, Aare Halliko, Hüseyin Çelik

10 March 2021 6	Partizan (Serbia)	70–75	(France) Metropolitans 92	Ljubljana
20:30	Scoring by quarter: 21–19, 14–16, 24–21, 11–19
Sport Klub	Pts: Thomas 20; Rebs: Janković 10; Asts: Jaramaz 6 PIR: Thomas 31	Boxscore	Pts: A. Brown 18; Rebs: A. Brown, Konaté 6 Asts: B. Brown 4 PIR: A. Brown 19	Arena: Arena Stožice; Attendance: 0 Referees: Daniel Hierrezuelo, Nick Van den Broeck, Stanislav Valeev
Note: The game was originally scheduled to be played in Belgrade. Due to restrictions in France due to COVID-19, the match was moved to Ljubljana.

== Serbian Super League ==
Win Loss

27 May 2021 Quarterfinals 1	Partizan	70–50	Mladost MaxBet	Belgrade
18:00	Scoring by quarter: 21–14, 11–12, 17–14, 21–10
Arena Sport	Pts: Trifunović 16; Rebs: Miletić 12; Asts: Perkins 5 PIR: Janković 17	Boxscore	Pts: Gombauld 14; Rebs: Gombauld, Belić 5 Asts: Mitchell 4 PIR: Gombauld, Belić 13	Arena: Ranko Žeravica Sports Hall; Referees: Milivoje Jovčić, Ivan Stefanović, Nemanja Vlahović

29 May 2021 Quarterfinals 2	Mladost MaxBet	84–94	Partizan	Belgrade
18:00	Scoring by quarter: 18–20, 21–28, 20–24, 25–22
Arena Sport	Pts: Igbanu 20; Rebs: Gombauld 5 Asts: Milosavljević 9 PIR: Gombauld 26	Boxscore	Pts: Trifunović 19; Rebs: Janković 8 Asts: Jaramaz 7 PIR: Trifunović 22	Arena: Ranko Žeravica Sports Hall; Attendance: 20; Referees: Uroš Obrknežević, Vladimir Vesković, Marko Strika

1 June 2021 Semifinals 1	Mega Soccerbet	94–86	Partizan	Belgrade
20:30	Scoring by quarter: 34–18, 16–24, 25–18, 19–26
Arena Sport	Pts: Cazalon 23; Rebs: Petrušev 8 Asts: Novak 8 PIR: Petrušev 28	Boxscore	Pts: Mika 22; Rebs: Mika 11; Asts: Jaramaz 8 PIR: Mika 35	Arena: Mega Factory; Attendance: 20; Referees: Ilija Belošević, Uroš Obrknežević, Siniša Prpa

3 June 2021 Semifinals 2	Partizan	81–77	Mega Soccerbet	Belgrade
19:00	Scoring by quarter: 12–25, 28–13, 23–23, 18–16
Arena Sport	Pts: Mika 19; Rebs: Veličković 6 Asts: Jaramaz 10; PIR: Jaramaz 24	Boxscore	Pts: Simonović 15; Rebs: Petrušev 9 Asts: Tepić 9 PIR: Simonović 20	Arena: Ranko Žeravica Sports Hall; Attendance: 1,027; Referees: Milivoje Jovčić, Aleksandar Glišić, Vladimir Jevtović

5 June 2021 Semifinals 3	Mega Soccerbet	82–68	Partizan	Belgrade
20:00	Scoring by quarter: 18–17, 25–18, 19–18, 20–15
Arena Sport	Pts: Cazalon 18; Rebs: Simonović, Petrušev 9 Asts: Tepić 7 PIR: Simonović 21	Boxscore	Pts: Jaramaz 19; Rebs: Veličković 7 Asts: Jaramaz, Dangubić; PIR: Jaramaz 17	Arena: Mega Factory; Attendance: 100; Referees: Ilija Belošević, Milivoje Jovčić, Uroš Nikolić

== Radivoj Korać Cup ==
Win Loss

11 February 2021 Quarterfinals	Partizan	76–72	Borac Čačak	Novi Sad
19:00	Scoring by quarter: 20–16, 20–16, 22–17, 14–23
Arena Sport	Pts: Mika 15; Rebs: Veličković, Thomas 6 Asts: Jaramaz 6 PIR: Mika 19	Boxscore	Pts: Jones 14; Rebs: Narandžić 9 Asts: Jones 7 PIR: Jones 18	Arena: SPC Vojvodina; Referees: Ilija Belošević, Marko Juras, Aleksandar Glišić

13 February 2021 Semifinals	Partizan	78–79	Crvena zvezda mts	Novi Sad
21:00	Scoring by quarter: 27–22, 19–18, 12–15, 20–24
Arena Sport	Pts: Jaramaz 18; Rebs: Thomas 7 Asts: Jaramaz 9 PIR: Jaramaz 28	Boxscore	Pts: Loyd 24; Rebs: Kuzmić 7 Asts: Davidovac, Uskoković 3 PIR: Loyd 24	Arena: SPC Vojvodina; Attendance: 30; Referees: Ilija Belošević, Mihailo Jovičić, Uroš Nikolić

== Individual awards ==
Adriatic League

MVP of the Round

- (Serbia) Ognjen Jaramaz – Round 13

MVP of the Month

- (United States) Rashawn Thomas – April
