= 2019–20 KK Partizan season =

Basketball season

Partizan NIS Belgrade
2019–20 season
- President: (Serbia) Ostoja Mijailović
- Head coach: (Italy) Andrea Trinchieri
- Arena: Štark Arena
- ABA League: 1st (voided)
- EuroCup: Quarterfinal (voided)
- Radivoj Korać Cup: Winners
- ABA Supercup: Winners
| Home | Away |
- All statistics correct as of May 27, 2020.

In the 2019–20 season, Partizan NIS Belgrade will compete in the Serbian League, Radivoj Korać Cup, Adriatic League and EuroCup.

== Players ==
=== Current roster ===
Note: Flags indicate national team eligibility at FIBA-sanctioned events. Players may hold other non-FIBA nationalities not displayed.

Partizan NIS Belgrade roster
Players
Coaches

| Pos. | No. | Nat. | Name | Ht. | | Age |
|---|---|---|---|---|---|---|
| G/F | 0 | (Colombia) | Angola, Braian | 1.98 m (6 ft 6 in) | 88 kg (194 lb) | 32 – 6 April 1994 |
| G | 2 | (United States) | Walden, Corey | 1.88 m (6 ft 2 in) | 86 kg (190 lb) | 34 – 5 August 1992 |
| SF | 3 | (Serbia) | Zagorac, Rade | 2.06 m (6 ft 9 in) | 92 kg (203 lb) | 31 – 12 August 1995 |
| G | 5 | (United States) | Paige, Marcus | 1.83 m (6 ft 0 in) | 74 kg (163 lb) | 33 – 11 September 1993 |
| G | 7 | (Bosnia and Herzegovina) | Gordić, Nemanja | 1.93 m (6 ft 4 in) | 90 kg (198 lb) | 37 – 25 September 1988 |
| C | 8 | (United States) | McAdoo, James | 2.06 m (6 ft 9 in) | 110 kg (243 lb) | 33 – 4 January 1993 |
| G | 9 | (Serbia) | Stefanović, Lazar (TW) | 1.95 m (6 ft 5 in) | 84 kg (185 lb) | 24 – 27 April 2002 |
| G | 10 | (Serbia) | Jaramaz, Ognjen | 1.93 m (6 ft 4 in) | 88 kg (194 lb) | 31 – 1 September 1995 |
| PF | 12 | (Serbia) | Veličković, Novica (C) | 2.05 m (6 ft 9 in) | 105 kg (231 lb) | 39 – 5 October 1986 |
| PF | 14 | (Serbia) | Birčević, Stefan | 2.10 m (6 ft 11 in) | 100 kg (220 lb) | 36 – 13 December 1989 |
| G/F | 15 | (United States) | Redding, Reggie | 1.93 m (6 ft 4 in) | 101 kg (223 lb) | 38 – 18 July 1988 |
| C | 21 | (Serbia) | Janković, Nikola | 2.08 m (6 ft 10 in) | 103 kg (227 lb) | 32 – 13 February 1994 |
| PF | 25 | (United States) | Thomas, Rashawn | 2.03 m (6 ft 8 in) | 104 kg (229 lb) | 32 – 15 August 1994 |
| G/F | 31 | (Latvia) | Peiners, Žanis | 2.05 m (6 ft 9 in) | 96 kg (212 lb) | 36 – 2 August 1990 |
| G/F | 32 | (Serbia) | Trifunović, Uroš | 1.99 m (6 ft 6 in) | 88 kg (194 lb) | 25 – 5 December 2000 |
| C | 42 | (United States) | Mosley, William | 2.03 m (6 ft 8 in) | 102 kg (225 lb) | 37 – 22 June 1989 |

Head coach

- (Italy) Andrea Trinchieri

Assistant coach(es)

- (Serbia) Aleksandar Matović
- (Montenegro) Vlado Šćepanović

Strength & conditioning coach(es)

- (Serbia) Vladimir Koprivica

Team manager

- (Serbia) Dušan Kecman

Legend

- (C) Team captain
- (TW) Two-way affiliate player
- Injured

- Roster
Updated: February 15, 2020

=== Players with multiple nationalities ===
- (United States) (Serbia) Marcus Paige
- (Bosnia and Herzegovina) (Serbia) Nemanja Gordić

=== Depth chart ===
| Pos. | Starting 5 | Bench 1 | Bench 2 | Injured | Reserves |
|---|---|---|---|---|---|
| C | Nikola Janković | William Mosley | James McAdoo |
| PF | Rashawn Thomas | Novica Veličković | Stefan Birčević |
| SF | Rade Zagorac | Braian Angola | Uroš Trifunović | | Žanis Peiners |
| SG | Ognjen Jaramaz | Marcus Paige | | Reggie Redding |
| PG | Corey Walden | Nemanja Gordić |

=== On loan ===
Partizan NIS players out on loan
| Nat. | Player | Position | Team | On loan since |
| (Slovenia) | Aleksej Nikolić | PG | (Italy) Treviso Basket | August 2019 |
| (Serbia) | Lazar Stefanović | SG/PG | (Serbia) Mladost Zemun (Two-way affiliate) | September 2019 |
| (Serbia) | Dušan Miletić | C | (Serbia) Borac Čačak | January 2020 |
| (Serbia) | Stefan Janković | PF/C | (United States) Capital City Go-Go | January 2020 |

=== Roster changes ===
==== In ====
| No. | Pos. | Nat. | Name | Moving from | | Type | Date | Source |
|---|---|---|---|---|---|---|---|---|
| 7 | PG | (Bosnia and Herzegovina) | Nemanja Gordić | Budućnost | (Montenegro) | End of contract | 5 July 2019 | |
| 25 | PF | (United States) | Rashawn Thomas | Dinamo Sassari | (Italy) | End of contract | 9 July 2019 | |
| 31 | G/F | (Latvia) | Žanis Peiners | Darüşşafaka | (Turkey) | End of contract | 22 July 2019 | |
| 42 | C | (United States) | William Mosley | Trieste | (Italy) | End of contract | 23 July 2019 | |
| 2 | G | (United States) | Corey Walden | Hapoel Holon | (Israel) | End of contract | 24 July 2019 | |
| 9 | C | (Belarus) | Artsiom Parakhouski | Rytas Vilnius | (Lithuania) | End of contract | 7 August 2019 | |
| 14 | PF | (Serbia) | Stefan Birčević | Baskets Bonn | (Germany) | End of contract | 23 August 2019 | |
| 10 | G | (Serbia) | Ognjen Jaramaz | San Pablo Burgos | (Spain) | End of contract | 5 October 2019 | |
| 15 | SG | (United States) | Reggie Redding | Türk Telekom | (Turkey) | End of contract | 28 November 2019 | |
| 8 | PF | (United States) | James McAdoo | Beşiktaş Sompo Japan Istanbul | (Turkey) | Parted ways | 10 January 2020 | |
| 0 | G/F | (Colombia) | Braian Angola | Oostende | (Belgium) | Parted ways | 15 February 2020 | |

==== Out ====
| No. | Pos. | Nat. | Name | Moving to | | Type | Date | Source |
|---|---|---|---|---|---|---|---|---|
| – | PF | (Serbia) | Nikola Tanasković | Mega Bemax | (Serbia) | End of contract | 10 June 2019 | |
| 10 | G | (Serbia) | Ognjen Jaramaz | San Pablo Burgos | (Spain) | Loan return | 18 June 2019 | |
| 4 | SG | (Serbia) | Vasilije Pušica | Consultinvest Pesaro | (Italy) | End of contract | 3 August 2019 | |
| 32 | G | (Bosnia and Herzegovina) | Alex Renfroe | Zenit Saint Petersburg | (Russia) | End of contract | 19 June 2019 | |
| 41 | C | (Serbia) | Đorđe Gagić | Aris | (Greece) | End of contract | 23 September 2019 | |
| 34 | C | (Australia) | Jock Landale | Žalgiris | (Lithuania) | Transfer | 20 May 2019 | |
| 11 | G | (Bosnia and Herzegovina) | Amar Gegić | Sloboda Tuzla | (Bosnia and Herzegovina) | End of contract | 10 August 2019 | |
| 9 | SG | (Serbia) | Vanja Marinković | Valencia Basket | (Spain) | Transfer | 23 July 2019 | |
| 5 | F | (France) | Bandja Sy | MoraBanc Andorra | (Spain) | Parted ways | 10 August 2019 | |
| 15 | PF | (Serbia) | Marko Pecarski | FMP | (Serbia) | Parted ways | 20 September 2019 | |
| 20 | F/C | (Serbia) | Dušan Tanasković | Mladost Zemun | (Serbia) | Transfer | 10 October 2019 | |
| 8 | SF | (Serbia) | Đorđe Pažin | FMP | (Serbia) | End of contract | 14 November 2019 | |
| 9 | C | (Belarus) | Artsiom Parakhouski | SIG Strasbourg | (France) | Parted ways | 23 November 2019 | |
| 7 | SG | (Serbia) | Aleksandar Aranitović | ADA Blois Basket 41 | (France) | Parted ways | 30 November 2019 | |

== Pre-season and friendlies ==
Win Loss

| 31 August 2019 | Sloga (Serbia) | 57–91 | (Serbia) Partizan | Kraljevo |
| 18:30 | Scoring by quarter: 15–26, 14–26, 16–20 |
| | Pts: Ćojbašić, Jovanović 9 Rebs: not available Asts: not available | Report | Pts: Jaramaz 15; Rebs: not available Asts: not available | Arena: Kraljevo Sports Hall; Attendance: 2,000 |

| 5 September 2019 | Partizan (Serbia) | 81–68 | (Turkey) Darüşşafaka Tekfen | Belgrade |
| 18:00 | Scoring by quarter: 20–21, 25–8, 20–21, 15–17 |
| | Pts: Jaramaz 13; Rebs: not available Asts: not available | Report | Pts: Lamb 15; Rebs: not available Asts: not available | Arena: Štark Arena |

| 7 September 2019 | Partizan (Serbia) | 84–76 | (Israel) Maccabi Tel Aviv | Włocławek |
| 16:30 | Scoring by quarter: 12–14, 27–22, 24–17, 21–23 |
| | Pts: Zagorac 18; Rebs: not available Asts: not available | Report; Report | Pts: Hunter 15; Rebs: Black 6 Asts: Wolters 5 | Arena: Hala Mistrzów |

| 8 September 2019 | Partizan (Serbia) | 100–67 | (Poland) Arka Gdynia | Włocławek |
| 16:30 | Scoring by quarter: 21–19, 26–11, 30–14, 23–23 |
| | Pts: Zagorac 20; Rebs: Thomas 12; Asts: Gordić 8 | Report; Report | Pts: Bostic 16; Rebs: Hammonds 7 Asts: Szubarga 4 | Arena: Hala Mistrzów |

| 14 September 2019 | Mornar (Montenegro) | 60–77 | (Serbia) Partizan | Cluj-Napoca |
| 17:00 | Scoring by quarter: 14–21, 16–20, 9–18, 21–18 |
| Sport Klub | Pts: Luković 12; Rebs: Šehović 8 Asts: Needham, Pullen 4 | Report; Report; Report | Pts: Zagorac 14; Rebs: Zagorac 8 Asts: not available | Arena: BT Arena |

| 15 September 2019 | Partizan (Serbia) | 69–64 | (Turkey) Fenerbahçe Beko | Cluj-Napoca |
| 19:00 | Scoring by quarter: 17–20, 17–11, 19–20, 16–13 |
| Sport Klub | Pts: Zagorac 21; Rebs: Thomas 11; Asts: Walden 5 | Report; Report | Pts: Williams 15; Rebs: Williams 6 Asts: Westermann 6 | Arena: BT Arena |

| 19 September 2019 | Partizan (Serbia) | 86–80 | (Greece) AEK | Belgrade |
| 18:00 | Scoring by quarter: 27–27, 11–25, 25–16, 23–12 |
| | Pts: Jaramaz 15; Rebs: Thomas 10; Asts: Gordić 8 | Report; Report | Pts: Langford 26; Rebs: Giannopoulos 5 Asts: Gkikas, Ray 4 | Arena: Štark Arena; Attendance: 3,000 |

== Adriatic League ==
=== Regular season ===
| Pos | Team | Pld | W | L | PF | PA | PD | Pts |
|---|---|---|---|---|---|---|---|---|
| 1 | (Serbia) Partizan NIS | 21 | 17 | 4 | 1754 | 1538 | +216 | 38 |
| 2 | (Montenegro) Budućnost VOLI | 21 | 15 | 6 | 1713 | 1517 | +196 | 36 |
| 3 | (Serbia) Crvena zvezda mts | 21 | 14 | 7 | 1758 | 1562 | +196 | 35 |
| 4 | (Slovenia) Cedevita Olimpija | 21 | 13 | 8 | 1766 | 1716 | +50 | 34 |
| 5 | (Montenegro) Mornar | 21 | 13 | 8 | 1774 | 1754 | +20 | 34 |

Source: Adriatic League

=== Matches ===
Win Loss Void

| 5 October 2019 1 | Igokea (Bosnia and Herzegovina) | 73–75 | (Serbia) Partizan | Laktaši |
| 18:00 | Scoring by quarter: 25-26, 13-17, 19-19, 16-13 |
| Arena Sport, O2 TV | Pts: Vaughn 22; Rebs: Stević 11; Asts: Lešić 5 PIR: Cvetković 22 | Report | Pts: Jaramaz 13; Rebs: Mosley 5 Asts: Jaramaz, Walden, Veličković, Peiners 2 PIR: Veličković 14 | Arena: Laktaši Sports Hall; Attendance: 4,000; Referees: Marko Juras, Mario Majkić, Milan Nedović |

| 12 October 2019 2 | Koper Primorska (Slovenia) | 68–56 | (Serbia) Partizan | Koper |
| 18:00 | Scoring by quarter: 22-14, 14-14, 20-11, 12-17 |
| Arena Sport, O2 TV | Pts: Harris 17; Rebs: Jagodić-Kuridža 11; Asts: Šiško 9 PIR: Šiško 20 | Report | Pts: Zagorac 10; Rebs: Peiners, Mosley 5 Asts: Gordić 4 PIR: Zagorac 12 | Arena: Arena Bonifika; Attendance: 2,500; Referees: Sreten Radović, Uroš Nikolić, Vladan Šundić |

| 19 October 2019 3 | Mornar (Montenegro) | 65–76 | (Serbia) Partizan | Bar |
| 17:00 | Scoring by quarter: 20-14, 12-19, 23-28, 10-15 |
| Arena Sport | Pts: Pullen 16; Rebs: Luković 7 Asts: Needham 6 PIR: Luković 16 | Report | Pts: Jaramaz 17; Rebs: Zagorac 10; Asts: Gordić 5 PIR: Jaramaz 17 | Arena: Topolica Sport Hall; Attendance: 3,500; Referees: Saša Pukl, Sašo Petek, Denis Hadžić |

| 26 October 2019 4 | Cedevita Olimpija (Slovenia) | 85–69 | (Serbia) Partizan | Ljubljana |
| 18:00 | Scoring by quarter: 24-21, 19-18, 15-18, 27-12 |
| Arena Sport, O2 TV | Pts: Miller-McIntyre, Simonović 17; Rebs: Zirbes 9 Asts: Miller-McIntyre 7 PIR: Stipanović, Zirbes 19 | Report | Pts: Gordić 13; Rebs: Walden 6 Asts: Jaramaz, Thomas 3 PIR: Walden, Gordić 11 | Arena: Arena Stožice; Attendance: 4,000; Referees: Ilija Belošević, Miloš Koljenšić, Dragan Porobić |

| 2 November 2019 5 | Partizan (Serbia) | 90–85 | (Serbia) FMP | Belgrade |
| 20:00 | Scoring by quarter: 19-20, 21-20, 26-19, 24-26 |
| Arena Sport | Pts: Thomas 23; Rebs: Mosley 9 Asts: Gordić 5 PIR: Thomas 31 | Report | Pts: Radanov 18; Rebs: Ulubay 6 Asts: Pot 12; PIR: Ulubay 20 | Arena: Aleksandar Nikolić Hall; Attendance: 5,200; Referees: Jakub Zamojski, Josip Radojković, Gordan Terlević |

| 9 November 2019 6 | Zadar (Croatia) | 57–72 | (Serbia) Partizan | Zadar |
| 18:00 | Scoring by quarter: 14-18, 16-27, 16-17, 11-10 |
| Arena Sport, O2 TV | Pts: Allen 16; Rebs: Keller 10; Asts: Uljarević 3 PIR: Ivanov, Keller 8 | Report | Pts: Paige 14; Rebs: Peiners 6 Asts: Gordić 7 PIR: Mosley, Paige 13 | Arena: Krešimir Ćosić Hall; Attendance: 5,000; Referees: Igor Dragojević, Matej Špendl, Krunoslav Peić |

| 17 November 2019 7 | Partizan (Serbia) | 75–72 | (Serbia) Crvena zvezda mts | Belgrade |
| 20:00 | Scoring by quarter: 26-19, 17-18, 13-18, 19-17 |
| Arena Sport, O2 TV | Pts: Walden 13; Rebs: Zagorac 8 Asts: Gordić 4 PIR: Walden 15 | Report | Pts: Čović 14; Rebs: Gist, Ojo 7 Asts: Čović, Brown, Baron 3 PIR: Ojo 15 | Arena: Štark Arena; Attendance: 9,268; Referees: Matej Boltauzer, Tomislav Hordov, Mario Majkić |

| 24 November 2019 8 | Budućnost VOLI (Montenegro) | 65–60 | (Serbia) Partizan | Podgorica |
| 18:00 | Scoring by quarter: 12-19, 17-18, 22-15, 14-8 |
| Arena Sport | Pts: Cobbs 14; Rebs: Martin 12; Asts: Ivanović 4 PIR: Martin 19 | Report | Pts: Veličković 11; Rebs: Thomas 8 Asts: Gordić, Paige 3 PIR: Thomas 15 | Arena: Morača Sports Center; Attendance: 5,280; Referees: Saša Pukl, Damir Javor, Milan Nedović |

| 1 December 2019 9 | Partizan (Serbia) | 102–80 | (Slovenia) Krka | Belgrade |
| 20:00 | Scoring by quarter: 22-20, 24-17, 23-19, 33-24 |
| Arena Sport, O2 TV | Pts: Birčević 20; Rebs: Birčević 8 Asts: Gordić 7 PIR: Zagorac 26 | Report | Pts: Cosey 24; Rebs: Cosey 4 Asts: Marinelli 4 PIR: Cosey 26 | Arena: Štark Arena; Attendance: 2,469; Referees: Uroš Obrknežević, Miloš Koljenšić, Denis Hadžić |

| 6 December 2019 10 | Mega Bemax (Serbia) | 77–98 | (Serbia) Partizan | Belgrade |
| 20:00 | Scoring by quarter: 27-22, 24-27, 15-17, 11-32 |
| Arena Sport | Pts: Simonović 18; Rebs: Simonović 7 Asts: Atić 7 PIR: Simonović, Ašćerić 18 | Report | Pts: Gordić 22; Rebs: Zagorac 10; Asts: Thomas, Redding 5 PIR: Thomas 30 | Arena: Ranko Žeravica Sports Hall; Attendance: 2,100; Referees: Jakub Zamojski, Radoš Arsenijević, Branislav Mrdak |

| 15 December 2019 11 | Partizan (Serbia) | 102–66 | (Croatia) Cibona | Belgrade |
| 20:00 | Scoring by quarter: 26-22, 23-16, 30-15, 23-13 |
| Arena Sport | Pts: Paige 15; Rebs: Janković 6 Asts: Paige, Zagorac 6 PIR: Janković 20 | Report | Pts: Gibson 18; Rebs: Novačić, Ljubičić, Ramljak 5 Asts: Rebec 7 PIR: Gibson 13 | Arena: Štark Arena; Attendance: 3,908; Referees: Uroš Obrknežević, Milivoje Jovčić, Ivan Stefanović |

| 21 December 2019 12 | Partizan (Serbia) | 89–73 | (Bosnia and Herzegovina) Igokea | Belgrade |
| 20:00 | Scoring by quarter: 21-18, 23-19, 19-16, 26-20 |
| Arena Sport | Pts: Paige 19; Rebs: Birčević, Mosley 5 Asts: Redding 5 PIR: Janković, Walden 16 | Report | Pts: Wright 15; Rebs: Ilić 8 Asts: Talić 6 PIR: Wright 22 | Arena: Štark Arena; Attendance: 2,507; Referees: Marko Juras, Uroš Nikolić, Matej Špendl |

| 29 December 2019 13 | Partizan (Serbia) | 81–62 | (Slovenia) Koper Primorska | Belgrade |
| 21:00 | Scoring by quarter: 19-16, 20-14, 24-16, 18-16 |
| Arena Sport | Pts: Thomas 15; Rebs: Thomas 9 Asts: Jaramaz, Redding 4 PIR: Thomas 19 | Report | Pts: Barič, Marinković, Vončina 15; Rebs: Marinković 10; Asts: Barič 8 PIR: Barič 16 | Arena: Štark Arena; Attendance: 5,010; Referees: Tomislav Hordov, Branislav Mrdak, Krunoslav Peić |

| 4 January 2020 14 | Partizan (Serbia) | 88–75 | (Montenegro) Mornar | Belgrade |
| 19:00 | Scoring by quarter: 17-11, 29-18, 20-24, 22-22 |
| Arena Sport, O2 TV | Pts: Paige 19; Rebs: Mosley 9 Asts: Mosley, Zagorac 5 PIR: Paige 21 | Report | Pts: Pullen 19; Rebs: Luković 12; Asts: Needham 8 PIR: Luković 22 | Arena: Štark Arena; Attendance: 5,266; Referees: Mario Majkić, Igor Dragojević, Gordan Terlević |

| 11 January 2020 15 | Partizan (Serbia) | 96–95 | (Slovenia) Cedevita Olimpija | Belgrade |
| 19:00 | Scoring by quarter: 23-25, 32-22, 26-22, 15-26 |
| Arena Sport, O2 TV | Pts: Jaramaz 16; Rebs: Zagorac 6 Asts: Jaramaz, Gordić 6 PIR: Jaramaz 23 | Report | Pts: Blažič 22; Rebs: Blažič 11; Asts: Boatright 4 PIR: Blažič 24 | Arena: Štark Arena; Attendance: 8,670; Referees: Ilija Belošević, Uroš Nikolić, Denis Hadžić |

| 18 January 2020 16 | FMP (Serbia) | 57–87 | (Serbia) Partizan | Belgrade |
| 19:00 | Scoring by quarter: 6-18, 15-18, 20-23, 15-28 |
| Arena Sport | Pts: Đorđević 14; Rebs: Đorđević, Pot 4 Asts: Pot, Ulubay 3 PIR: Đorđević 17 | Report | Pts: Birčević 14; Rebs: Walden 10; Asts: Paige 5 PIR: Walden 21 | Arena: Železnik Hall; Attendance: 1,100; Referees: Sašo Petek, Milan Nedović, Vladan Šundić |

| 25 January 2020 17 | Partizan (Serbia) | 87–60 | (Croatia) Zadar | Belgrade |
| 20:00 | Scoring by quarter: 12-13, 31-13, 18-18, 26-16 |
| Arena Sport | Pts: McAdoo, Jaramaz 13; Rebs: Veličković 6 Asts: Gordić 10; PIR: McAdoo 20 | Report | Pts: Fundić 19; Rebs: Vuković 8 Asts: Allen 5 PIR: Fundić 21 | Arena: Aleksandar Nikolić Hall; Attendance: 3,982; Referees: Uroš Obrknežević, Milivoje Jovčić, Radoš Savović |

| 3 February 2020 18 | Crvena zvezda mts (Serbia) | 92–86 | (Serbia) Partizan | Belgrade |
| 18:00 | Scoring by quarter: 25-23, 19-19, 23-24, 25-20 |
| Arena Sport, O2 TV | Pts: Baron 26; Rebs: Jagodić-Kuridža, Štimac 6 Asts: L.Brown 8 PIR: Baron 31 | Report | Pts: Gordić 14; Rebs: Walden 5 Asts: Gordić 4 PIR: Mosley 18 | Arena: Aleksandar Nikolić Hall; Attendance: 5,983; Referees: Sreten Radović, Marko Juras, Uroš Nikolić |

| 9 February 2020 19 | Partizan (Serbia) | 87–82 | (Montenegro) Budućnost VOLI | Belgrade |
| 18:00 | Scoring by quarter: 19-23, 28-22, 21-19, 19-18 |
| Arena Sport, O2 TV | Pts: Paige 20; Rebs: Zagorac 7 Asts: Walden 6 PIR: Jaramaz 27 | Report | Pts: Šehović 21; Rebs: D.Nikolić 8 Asts: Ivanović 6 PIR: Šehović 21 | Arena: Štark Arena; Attendance: 16,531; Referees: Ilija Belošević, Tomislav Hordov, Igor Dragojević |

| 29 February 2020 20 | Krka (Slovenia) | 61–76 | (Serbia) Partizan | Novo Mesto |
| 18:00 | Scoring by quarter: 15-25, 12-22, 11-11, 23-18 |
| Arena Sport, O2 TV | Pts: Đapa 16; Rebs: Jošilo 6 Asts: Cosey 6 PIR: Jošilo 15 | Report | Pts: Birčević 17; Rebs: Angola, Birčević, Janković 5 Asts: Paige, Jaramaz 4 PIR: Birčević 21 | Arena: Leon Štukelj Hall; Attendance: 1,200; Referees: Miloš Koljenšić, Krunoslav Peić, Vladan Šundić |

| 9 March 2020 21 | Partizan (Serbia) | 102–88 | (Serbia) Mega Bemax | Belgrade |
| 21:00 | Scoring by quarter: 24-22, 19-20, 32-24, 27-22 |
| Arena Sport | Pts: Angola, Paige, Gordić 16; Rebs: Angola 7 Asts: Gordić 6 PIR: Angola 23 | Report | Pts: Perry 21; Rebs: Atić, Simonović 5 Asts: Perry 8 PIR: Perry 21 | Arena: Štark Arena; Attendance: 3,127; Referees: Damir Javor, Sašo Petek, Radoš Savović |

| 12 March 2020 22 | Cibona (Croatia) | Void | (Serbia) Partizan | Zagreb |
| Arena Sport | | Report | | Arena: Dražen Petrović Basketball Hall |

On 12 March 2020, ABA League announced it was suspending the season due to the coronavirus pandemic. On 27 May, the season was voided.

== EuroCup ==
=== Regular season ===
==== Group B ====
| Pos | Team | Pld | W | L | PF | PA | PD | Qualification |
|---|---|---|---|---|---|---|---|---|
| 1 | (Italy) Umana Reyer Venezia | 10 | 8 | 2 | 759 | 713 | +46 | Advance to Top 16 |
| 2 | (Serbia) Partizan NIS | 10 | 7 | 3 | 767 | 722 | +45 | Advance to Top 16 |
| 3 | (Turkey) Tofaş | 10 | 5 | 5 | 804 | 822 | −18 | Advance to Top 16 |
| 4 | (Lithuania) Rytas | 10 | 4 | 6 | 800 | 811 | −11 | Advance to Top 16 |
| 5 | (Russia) Lokomotiv Kuban | 10 | 4 | 6 | 797 | 780 | +17 | |
| 6 | (France) Limoges CSP | 10 | 2 | 8 | 748 | 827 | −79 | |

Source: EuroCup Basketball
Rules for classification: All points scored in extra period(s) were not counted in the standings, nor for any tie-break situation.

==== Matches ====
Win Loss

| 1 October 2019 1 | Umana Reyer Venezia (Italy) | 63–66 | (Serbia) Partizan | Venice |
| 20:00 | Scoring by quarter: 11–19, 17–11, 19–18, 16–18 |
| Sport Klub | Pts: Bramos 12; Rebs: Bramos 9 Asts: Filloy 4 PIR: Bramos 15 | Boxscore | Pts: Paige 14; Rebs: Thomas 13; Asts: Jaramaz 4 PIR: Thomas 19 | Arena: Palasport Giuseppe Taliercio; Attendance: 3,452; Referees: Carlos Cortes, Marcin Kowalski, Renaud Geller |

| 8 October 2019 2 | Partizan (Serbia) | 93–80 | (Turkey) Tofaş | Belgrade |
| 20:00 | Scoring by quarter: 15–27, 30–22, 21–17, 27–14 |
| Sport Klub | Pts: Zagorac 26; Rebs: Veličković 7 Asts: Walden 7 PIR: Zagorac 35 | Boxscore | Pts: Williams 18; Rebs: Phillip 6 Asts: Phillip 8 PIR: Phillip 23 | Arena: Štark Arena; Attendance: 8,085; Referees: Daniel Hierrezuelo, Jakub Zamojski, Gytis Vilius |

| 15 October 2019 3 | Rytas Vilnius (Lithuania) | 61–66 | (Serbia) Partizan | Vilnius |
| 18:00 | Scoring by quarter: 18–17, 12–17, 18–16, 13–16 |
| Sport Klub | Pts: Cruz, Bendžius 15; Rebs: Bendžius, Butkevičius 6 Asts: Cruz 5 PIR: Bendžius 23 | Boxscore | Pts: Paige 17; Rebs: Mosley 7 Asts: Gordić 7 PIR: Mosley 17 | Arena: Siemens Arena; Attendance: 4,123; Referees: Mehdi Difallah, Ersan Kartal, Artem Lavrukhin |

| 22 October 2019 4 | Partizan (Serbia) | 80–71 | (Russia) Lokomotiv Kuban | Belgrade |
| 20:00 | Scoring by quarter: 24–18, 17–17, 16–23, 23–13 |
| Sport Klub | Pts: Thomas 16; Rebs: Mosley 9 Asts: Walden 5 PIR: Mosley 20 | Boxscore | Pts: Dekker, Cummings 17; Rebs: Williams 10; Asts: Cummings 7 PIR: Williams, Kalnietis 18 | Arena: Aleksandar Nikolić Hall; Attendance: 7,358; Referees: Piotr Pastusiak, Rain Peerandi, Hugues Thepeiner |

| 30 October 2019 5 | Limoges CSP (France) | 60–82 | (Serbia) Partizan | Limoges |
| 19:15 | Scoring by quarter: 25–16, 7–20, 8–20, 20–26 |
| Sport Klub | Pts: Invernizzi 13; Rebs: Conklin 5 Asts: Christon 10; PIR: Invernizzi 14 | Boxscore | Pts: Thomas 16; Rebs: Mosley 9 Asts: Gordić 6 PIR: Mosley 21 | Arena: Palais des Sports de Beaublanc; Attendance: 4,287; Referees: Carlos Peruga, Saulius Racys, Sebastien Clivaz |

| 5 November 2019 6 | Partizan (Serbia) | 69–83 | (Italy) Umana Reyer Venezia | Belgrade |
| 20:00 | Scoring by quarter: 18–21, 21–16, 9–25, 21–21 |
| Sport Klub | Pts: Thomas 18; Rebs: Mosley 7 Asts: Mosley 6 PIR: Mosley 22 | Boxscore | Pts: Watt 27; Rebs: Stone 11; Asts: Stone 7 PIR: Watt 37 | Arena: Štark Arena; Attendance: 9,124; Referees: Carlos Cortes, Jurgis Laurinavicus, Sinan Isguder |

| 13 November 2019 7 | Tofaş (Turkey) | 82–72 | (Serbia) Partizan | Bursa |
| 18:00 | Scoring by quarter: 18–10, 24–21, 21–23, 19–18 |
| Sport Klub | Pts: Mejía 26; Rebs: Williams 9 Asts: Ermiş 5 PIR: Mejía 29 | Boxscore | Pts: Gordić 15; Rebs: Thomas, Mosley, Birčević 6 Asts: Zagorac, Jaramaz 3 PIR: Mosley 13 | Arena: Tofaş Spor Salonu; Attendance: 4,773; Referees: Rober Lottermoser, Gytis Vilius, Vasiliki Tsaroucha |

| 20 November 2019 8 | Partizan (Serbia) | 86–81 | (Lithuania) Rytas Vilnius | Belgrade |
| 20:00 | Scoring by quarter: 23–21, 23–19, 22–17, 18–24 |
| Sport Klub | Pts: Zagorac 17; Rebs: Thomas 5 Asts: Jaramaz, Gordić 4 PIR: Thomas 20 | Boxscore | Pts: Bendžius 15; Rebs: Bairstow 5 Asts: Holloway 7 PIR: Bendžius 13 | Arena: Štark Arena; Attendance: 7,940; Referees: Mehdi Difallah, Marcin Kowalski, Moritz Reiter |

| 11 December 2019 9 | Lokomotiv Kuban (Russia) | 83–76 | (Serbia) Partizan | Krasnodar |
| 18:00 | Scoring by quarter: 27–19, 18–21, 22–26, 16–10 |
| Sport Klub | Pts: Kuzminskas 17; Rebs: Williams 9 Asts: Kalnietis 9 PIR: Kulagin 17 | Boxscore | Pts: Birčević 17; Rebs: Thomas 6 Asts: Redding 6 PIR: Birčević 19 | Arena: Basket-Hall Krasnodar; Attendance: 2,356; Referees: Seffi Shemmesh, Robert Vyklicky |

| 18 December 2019 10 | Partizan (Serbia) | 77–58 | (France) Limoges CSP | Belgrade |
| 20:30 | Scoring by quarter: 16–14, 24–20, 14–6, 23–18 |
| Sport Klub | Pts: Janković 14; Rebs: Zagorac 7 Asts: Redding, Jaramaz 5 PIR: Janković, Jaramaz 16 | Boxscore | Pts: Ginyard 15; Rebs: Boutsiele 8 Asts: Brown, Stoll 4 PIR: Boutsiele 20 | Arena: Štark Arena; Attendance: 4,530; Referees: Petros Papapetrou, Tomasz Trawicki, Semen Ovinov |

=== Top 16: Group E ===
| Pos | Team | Pld | W | L | PF | PA | PD | Qualification |
|---|---|---|---|---|---|---|---|---|
| 1 | (Serbia) Partizan NIS | 6 | 5 | 1 | 489 | 418 | +71 | Advance to quarterfinals |
| 2 | (Italy) Segafredo Virtus Bologna | 6 | 4 | 2 | 519 | 488 | +31 | Advance to quarterfinals |
| 3 | (Turkey) Darüşşafaka Tekfen | 6 | 3 | 3 | 458 | 464 | −6 | |
| 4 | (Italy) Dolomiti Energia Trento | 6 | 0 | 6 | 413 | 509 | −96 | |

Source: EuroCup Basketball
Rules for classification: All points scored in extra period(s) were not counted in the standings, nor for any tie-break situation.

==== Matches ====
Win Loss

| 8 January 2020 1 | Partizan (Serbia) | 99–81 | (Italy) Segafredo Virtus Bologna | Belgrade |
| 20:00 | Scoring by quarter: 26–23, 36–19, 22–21, 15–18 |
| Sport Klub | Pts: Walden 23; Rebs: Veličković 7 Asts: Gordić 4 PIR: Gordić 30 | Boxscore | Pts: Gaines 21; Rebs: Gamble 7 Asts: Marković 6 PIR: Gaines 20 | Arena: Štark Arena; Attendance: 17,205; Referees: Christos Christodoulou, Joseph Bissang, Miloš Koljenšić |

| 15 January 2020 2 | Dolomiti Energia Trento (Italy) | 58–83 | (Serbia) Partizan | Trento |
| 19:00 | Scoring by quarter: 12–24, 16–23, 12–14, 18–22 |
| Sport Klub | Pts: Blackmon 12; Rebs: Knox 8 Asts: Mian 3 PIR: Craft 14 | Boxscore | Pts: Paige, Zagorac 11; Rebs: Janković 9 Asts: Walden 5 PIR: Paige, Janković 15 | Arena: BLM Group Arena; Attendance: 1,641; Referees: Emilio Perez, Rain Peerandi, Hugues Thepeiner |

| 21 January 2020 3 | Darüşşafaka Tekfen (Turkey) | 65–63 | (Serbia) Partizan | Istanbul |
| 18:15 | Scoring by quarter: 15–12, 15–20, 18–11, 17–20 |
| Sport Klub | Pts: Demir 13; Rebs: Hamilton 6 Asts: Browne 9 PIR: Browne 15 | Boxscore | Pts: Paige, Zagorac, McAdoo 13; Rebs: Janković 7 Asts: Gordić 4 PIR: McAdoo 16 | Arena: Volkswagen Arena; Attendance: 3,781; Referees: Robert Lottermoser, Marcin Kowalski, Sebastien Clivaz |

| 28 January 2020 4 | Partizan (Serbia) | 69–57 | (Turkey) Darüşşafaka Tekfen | Belgrade |
| 20:00 | Scoring by quarter: 16–17, 19–8, 14–18, 20–14 |
| Sport Klub | Pts: Jaramaz 15; Rebs: Mosley 8 Asts: Paige, Gordić, Jaramaz 2 PIR: Jaramaz 18 | Boxscore | Pts: Hamilton 17; Rebs: Hamilton 9 Asts: Güler 7 PIR: Hamilton 22 | Arena: Aleksandar Nikolić Hall; Attendance: 7,813; Referees: Seffi Shemmesh, Anne Panther, Renaud Geller |

| 5 February 2020 5 | Segafredo Virtus Bologna (Italy) | 82–84 | (Serbia) Partizan | Bologna |
| 20:00 | Scoring by quarter: 18–13, 29–22, 21–28, 14–28 |
| Sport Klub | Pts: Teodosić 24; Rebs: Gamble 6 Asts: Teodosić 10; PIR: Teodosić 30 | Boxscore | Pts: Walden 29; Rebs: Thomas 6 Asts: Paige 4 PIR: Walden 33 | Arena: PalaDozza; Attendance: 4,578; Referees: Juan Carlos Garcia, Ersan Kartal, Saulius Racys |

| 4 March 2020 6 | Partizan (Serbia) | 91–75 | (Italy) Dolomiti Energia Trento | Belgrade |
| 21:00 | Scoring by quarter: 21–22, 24–17, 18–14, 28–22 |
| Sport Klub | Pts: Jaramaz 19; Rebs: Thomas 9 Asts: Janković 7 PIR: Thomas 26 | Boxscore | Pts: Knox 20; Rebs: Knox 7 Asts: Craft 10; PIR: Knox 23 | Arena: Štark Arena; Attendance: 9,175; Referees: Carlos Cortes, Robert Vyklicky, Amit Balak |

=== Quarterfinals ===
On 12 March 2020, Euroleague Basketball announced it was suspending the season due to the coronavirus pandemic. On 25 May, the season was voided.

Void

| 17 March 2020 Game 1 | Partizan (Serbia) | Void | (Russia) UNICS | Belgrade |
| | | Boxscore | | Arena: Štark Arena |

| 20 March 2020 Game 2 | UNICS (Russia) | Void | (Serbia) Partizan | Kazan |
| | | Boxscore | | Arena: Basket-Hall Kazan |

== Adriatic Supercup ==
Win Loss

| 26 September 2019 Quarterfinals | Partizan (Serbia) | 86–73 | (Serbia) Mega Bemax | Zagreb |
| 17:00 | Scoring by quarter: 18–21, 28–12, 25–16, 15–24 |
| Arena Sport | Pts: Paige 21; Rebs: Thomas 7 Asts: Paige 4 PIR: Paige 27 | Report | Pts: Simonović 17; Rebs: Simonović 9 Asts: Trifunović, Čarapić, Cerovina, Tanasković 3 PIR: Simonović 19 | Arena: Dražen Petrović Basketball Hall; Attendance: 500; Referees: Sašo Petek, Marko Juras, Igor Dragojević |

| 28 September 2019 Semifinals | Koper Primorska (Slovenia) | 77–91 | (Serbia) Partizan | Zagreb |
| 17:00 | Scoring by quarter: 22–19, 26–24, 14–23, 15–25 |
| Arena Sport | Pts: Holt 17; Rebs: Jagodić-Kuridža 7 Asts: Šiško 5 PIR: Jagodić-Kuridža 23 | Report | Pts: Thomas 19; Rebs: Thomas 12; Asts: Gordić, Jaramaz 4 PIR: Thomas 26 | Arena: Dražen Petrović Basketball Hall; Attendance: 450; Referees: Miloš Koljenšić, Mario Majkić, Vladan Šundić |

| 29 September 2019 Final | Partizan (Serbia) | 99–77 | (Slovenia) Cedevita Olimpija | Zagreb |
| 20:00 | Scoring by quarter: 20–20, 35–24, 29–29, 15–4 |
| Arena Sport, O2 TV | Pts: Jaramaz 20; Rebs: Thomas, Peiners 6 Asts: Gordić 8 PIR: Jaramaz 23 | Report | Pts: Blažič 18; Rebs: Murić 7 Asts: Miller-McIntyre 8 PIR: Boatright 14 | Arena: Dražen Petrović Basketball Hall; Attendance: 1,000; Referees: Ilija Belošević, Tomislav Hordov, Milan Nedović |

== Radivoj Korać Cup ==
Win Loss

| 14 February 2020 Quarterfinals | Partizan | 87–79 | Borac Čačak | Niš |
| 19:30 | Scoring by quarter: 20–18, 26–15, 13–22, 28–24 |
| Arena Sport | Pts: Zagorac 16; Rebs: McAdoo 9 Asts: Jaramaz 5 PIR: McAdoo 20 | Boxscore | Pts: Đoković 18; Rebs: Narandžić, Čarapić 5 Asts: S.Popović 5 PIR: Jones 20 | Arena: Čair Sports Center; Attendance: 4,000; Referees: Saša Maričić, Branislav Mrdak, Vladimir Vesković |

| 15 February 2020 Semifinals | Partizan | 85–77 | FMP | Niš |
| 21:00 | Scoring by quarter: 24–22, 16–23, 23–12, 22–20 |
| Arena Sport | Pts: Thomas 13; Rebs: Zagorac, Jaramaz, Thomas 6 Asts: Walden 5 PIR: Walden 16 | Boxscore | Pts: Kuzmić 13; Rebs: Kuzmić, Đorđević, Radanov 6 Asts: Čović 8 PIR: Čović 24 | Arena: Čair Sports Center; Attendance: 4,500; Referees: Ilija Belošević, Uroš Obrknežević, Uroš Nikolić |

| 16 February 2020 Final | Crvena zvezda | 84–85(OT) | Partizan | Niš |
| 21:00 | Scoring by quarter: 13–19, 18–15, 18–18, 29–26, Overtime: 6–7 |
| Arena Sport | Pts: Brown 17; Rebs: Štimac 10; Asts: Brown 7 PIR: Štimac 17 | Boxscore | Pts: Paige 21; Rebs: Zagorac 6 Asts: Walden 5 PIR: Jaramaz 22 | Arena: Čair Sports Center; Attendance: 5,000; Referees: Ilija Belošević, Milivoje Jovčić, Uroš Nikolić |

== Individual awards ==
Adriatic League

MVP of the Round

- (United States) Rashawn Thomas – Round 5

MVP of the Month

- (United States) Rashawn Thomas – December

Eurocup

MVP of the Round - Regular season

- (Serbia) Rade Zagorac – Round 2

MVP of the Round - Top 16

- (United States) Corey Walden – Round 5

Adriatic Supercup

MVP

- (United States) Rashawn Thomas

Radivoj Korać Cup

MVP

- (Serbia) Ognjen Jaramaz

Top Scorer

- (United States) Marcus Paige

== Statistics ==
Legend
| GP | Games played | GS | Games started | MPG | Minutes per game |
| FG% | Field-goal percentage | 3FG% | 3-point field-goal percentage | FT% | Free-throw percentage |
| RPG | Rebounds per game | APG | Assists per game | SPG | Steals per game |
| BPG | Blocks per game | PPG | Points per game | PIR | PIR per game |

=== ABA League ===
| Player | GP | GS | MPG | 2FG% | 3FG% | FT% | RPG | APG | SPG | BPG | PPG | PIR |
|---|---|---|---|---|---|---|---|---|---|---|---|---|
| Braian Angola | 2 | 1 | 20.0 | .500 | .400 | 1.000 | 6.0 | 1.5 | 1.0 | 0.0 | 10.5 | 17.0 |
| Corey Walden | 18 | 18 | 21.2 | .481 | .322 | .839 | 3.5 | 1.8 | 0.8 | 0.2 | 8.9 | 9.8 |
| Rade Zagorac | 20 | 17 | 23.2 | .403 | .276 | .639 | 5.1 | 2.3 | 1.4 | 0.3 | 7.4 | 9.2 |
| Marcus Paige | 20 | 1 | 21.3 | .513 | .480 | .900 | 1.4 | 2.1 | 0.7 | 0.3 | 10.7 | 9.8 |
| Nemanja Gordić | 18 | 1 | 22.9 | .427 | .350 | .800 | 2.0 | 4.6 | 0.3 | 0.0 | 8.8 | 9.7 |
| James McAdoo | 6 | 1 | 11.0 | .833 | .000 | .533 | 3.0 | 0.3 | 0.3 | 0.3 | 8.0 | 10.0 |
| Ognjen Jaramaz | 20 | 18 | 20.8 | .567 | .333 | .789 | 2.1 | 2.4 | 0.9 | 0.1 | 10.3 | 10.6 |
| Novica Veličković | 18 | 10 | 13.2 | .473 | .341 | .800 | 3.1 | 1.5 | 0.2 | 0.1 | 6.3 | 6.3 |
| Stefan Birčević | 19 | 1 | 11.9 | .565 | .403 | .733 | 2.2 | 0.1 | 0.2 | 0.3 | 5.9 | 4.1 |
| Reggie Redding | 6 | 2 | 21.0 | .600 | .444 | .800 | 2.7 | 4.5 | 1.3 | 0.3 | 9.3 | 13.2 |
| Nikola Janković | 21 | 16 | 14.2 | .590 | .500 | .592 | 3.1 | 1.0 | 0.8 | 0.3 | 7.3 | 8.5 |
| Rashawn Thomas | 16 | 11 | 19.4 | .650 | .147 | .766 | 4.5 | 1.9 | 0.7 | 0.5 | 8.9 | 11.3 |
| Žanis Peiners | 9 | 1 | 14.3 | .545 | .300 | .929 | 2.3 | 0.7 | 0.6 | 0.0 | 3.8 | 4.6 |
| Uroš Trifunović | 8 | 1 | 14.6 | .468 | .250 | .556 | 1.2 | 0.3 | 0.1 | 0.0 | 4.4 | 0.7 |
| William Mosley | 21 | 2 | 17.0 | .716 | .000 | .600 | 4.2 | 1.0 | 0.6 | 1.5 | 5.7 | 9.7 |
Players that left club during the season
| Artsiom Parakhouski | 4 | 0 | 8.5 | .667 | .000 | .000 | 1.6 | 0.3 | 0.3 | 0.3 | 3.0 | 4.5 |
| Dušan Miletić | 7 | 4 | 6.7 | .545 | .000 | .714 | 1.6 | 0.4 | 0.3 | 0.4 | 2.4 | 3.4 |

=== Eurocup ===
| Player | GP | GS | MPG | 2FG% | 3FG% | FT% | RPG | APG | SPG | BPG | PPG | PIR |
|---|---|---|---|---|---|---|---|---|---|---|---|---|
| Braian Angola | Not registered | | | | | | | | | | | |
| Corey Walden | 12 | 12 | 22:01 | .472 | .450 | .857 | 3.5 | 2.8 | 0.7 | 0.0 | 9.8 | 11.5 |
| Rade Zagorac | 14 | 14 | 24:11 | .531 | .245 | .667 | 4.3 | 1.5 | 1.4 | 0.1 | 8.9 | 8.4 |
| Marcus Paige | 16 | 0 | 22:05 | .406 | .420 | .848 | 1.8 | 1.6 | 0.7 | 0.4 | 8.8 | 8.2 |
| Nemanja Gordić | 16 | 2 | 21:09 | .474 | .321 | .718 | 2.7 | 3.3 | 0.3 | 0.0 | 9.4 | 9.2 |
| James McAdoo | 5 | 0 | 11:21 | .800 | .000 | .615 | 1.4 | 0.4 | 0.8 | 1.0 | 4.8 | 7.0 |
| Ognjen Jaramaz | 15 | 15 | 22:01 | .418 | .311 | .667 | 2.3 | 2.8 | 0.6 | 0.1 | 9.0 | 9.0 |
| Novica Veličković | 8 | 5 | 14:30 | .538 | .438 | .700 | 4.1 | 1.6 | 0.5 | 0.0 | 7.9 | 9.8 |
| Stefan Birčević | 16 | 1 | 15:16 | .714 | .293 | .714 | 2.8 | 0.4 | 0.2 | 0.4 | 5.7 | 4.5 |
| Reggie Redding | 3 | 1 | 21:02 | .385 | .000 | .750 | 2.3 | 4.3 | 1.3 | 0.0 | 4.3 | 3.0 |
| Nikola Janković | 16 | 11 | 13:16 | .500 | .250 | .588 | 3.5 | 1.1 | 0.8 | 0.3 | 5.3 | 6.1 |
| Rashawn Thomas | 13 | 10 | 20:39 | .552 | .364 | .652 | 5.3 | 0.9 | 0.9 | 0.7 | 9.8 | 12.3 |
| Žanis Peiners | 10 | 2 | 10:46 | .571 | .091 | .444 | 0.7 | 0.6 | 0.3 | 0.1 | 2.3 | 0.9 |
| Uroš Trifunović | 9 | 1 | 13:14 | .476 | .350 | .889 | 1.7 | 0.8 | 0.2 | 0.0 | 5.4 | 5.6 |
| William Mosley | 16 | 2 | 20:39 | .774 | .333 | .472 | 5.6 | 0.7 | 0.9 | 1.4 | 6.4 | 11.5 |
Players that left club during the season
| Artsiom Parakhouski | 5 | 1 | 8:01 | .500 | .000 | .000 | 1.2 | 0.0 | 0.2 | 0.2 | 1.6 | 1.2 |
| Dušan Miletić | 5 | 3 | 3:10 | .000 | .000 | .000 | 0.8 | 0.4 | 0.2 | 0.4 | 0.0 | 0.4 |

=== ABA Supercup ===
| Player | GP | GS | MPG | 2FG% | 3FG% | FT% | RPG | APG | SPG | BPG | PPG | PIR |
|---|---|---|---|---|---|---|---|---|---|---|---|---|
| Corey Walden | 3 | 3 | 20.3 | .571 | .200 | .900 | 1.0 | 3.0 | 1.7 | 0.0 | 7.7 | 8.0 |
| Rade Zagorac | 2 | 2 | 19.5 | .429 | .333 | .667 | 3.5 | 0.5 | 0.0 | 0.0 | 8.5 | 6.5 |
| Marcus Paige | 3 | 0 | 23.0 | .429 | .600 | .750 | 1.7 | 2.7 | 2.3 | 0.0 | 9.0 | 12.7 |
| Nemanja Gordić | 3 | 0 | 20.7 | .647 | .333 | .700 | 2.3 | 5.0 | 0.7 | 0.0 | 11.7 | 13.7 |
| Ognjen Jaramaz | 3 | 3 | 20.3 | .500 | .357 | .500 | 1.3 | 4.0 | 1.0 | 0.0 | 9.3 | 7.7 |
| Novica Veličković | 1 | 0 | 0.6 | .000 | .000 | .000 | 1.0 | 0.0 | 0.0 | 0.0 | 0.0 | 1.0 |
| Stefan Birčević | 3 | 0 | 19.7 | .833 | .357 | .600 | 3.7 | 0.3 | 1.0 | 0.1 | 9.3 | 7.7 |
| Nikola Janković | 3 | 0 | 13.0 | .643 | .000 | .333 | 4.3 | 0.3 | 0.7 | 0.0 | 6.7 | 7.3 |
| Rashawn Thomas | 3 | 3 | 20.3 | .704 | .167 | .667 | 8.3 | 1.7 | 1.3 | 1.3 | 15.7 | 21.0 |
| Žanis Peiners | 3 | 1 | 17.3 | .714 | .400 | .800 | 3.7 | 1.3 | 0.7 | 0.7 | 6.7 | 11.0 |
| William Mosley | 3 | 1 | 16.7 | .727 | .000 | .667 | 1.3 | 1.0 | 1.0 | 0.7 | 7.3 | 8.7 |
Players that left club during the season
| Artsiom Parakhouski | 3 | 2 | 7.7 | .571 | .000 | .250 | 2.6 | 0.7 | 0.0 | 0.0 | 3.0 | 2.7 |
| Dušan Miletić | 1 | 0 | 4.9 | .000 | .000 | .000 | 0.0 | 0.0 | 0.0 | 0.0 | 0.0 | -1.0 |

=== Radivoj Korać Cup ===
| Player | GP | GS | MPG | 2FG% | 3FG% | FT% | RPG | APG | SPG | BPG | PPG | PIR |
|---|---|---|---|---|---|---|---|---|---|---|---|---|
| Corey Walden | 3 | 3 | 25.6 | .720 | .386 | .883 | 2.6 | 4.0 | 1.3 | 0.0 | 11.0 | 15.3 |
| Rade Zagorac | 3 | 2 | 26.6 | .320 | .463 | .916 | 5.6 | 2.3 | 0.6 | 0.0 | 12.3 | 12.3 |
| Luka Tarlać | Did not play | | | | | | | | | | | |
| Marcus Paige | 3 | 0 | 25.3 | .580 | .396 | .800 | 1.0 | 1.3 | 0.6 | 0.0 | 12.3 | 9.0 |
| Nemanja Gordić | Not added to the roster (injured) | | | | | | | | | | | |
| James McAdoo | 3 | 1 | 10.3 | 1.000 | .000 | .000 | 3.6 | 0.0 | 0.0 | 1.3 | 4.0 | 8.3 |
| Lazar Stefanović | 1 | 0 | 0.2 | .000 | .000 | .000 | 0.0 | 0.0 | 0.0 | 0.0 | 0.0 | 0.0 |
| Ognjen Jaramaz | 3 | 3 | 28.0 | .450 | .416 | .667 | 3.0 | 2.6 | 1.3 | 0.0 | 13.3 | 13.3 |
| Novica Veličković | 2 | 2 | 16.5 | .410 | .500 | .000 | 3.0 | 1.5 | 0.0 | 0.0 | 6.5 | 5.0 |
| Stefan Birčević | 3 | 1 | 15.0 | .750 | .416 | .500 | 2.0 | 0.3 | 0.3 | 0.0 | 7.0 | 5.0 |
| Reggie Redding | Not added to the roster (injured) | | | | | | | | | | | |
| Nikola Janković | 3 | 2 | 13.3 | .513 | .000 | .500 | 4.6 | 1.3 | 0.6 | 0.3 | 7.3 | 8.6 |
| Nikola Radovanović | Did not play | | | | | | | | | | | |
| Rashawn Thomas | 3 | 1 | 17.0 | .396 | .500 | .500 | 4.3 | 1.6 | 0.6 | 0.6 | 8.0 | 8.0 |
| Žanis Peiners | Not added to the roster | | | | | | | | | | | |
| Uroš Trifunović | 3 | 0 | 8.3 | .333 | .000 | .500 | 1.0 | 0.3 | 0.0 | 0.0 | 1.3 | -1.0 |
| William Mosley | 3 | 0 | 20.9 | .660 | .000 | .165 | 3.6 | 0.6 | 1.0 | 2.3 | 4.6 | 8.3 |
