= 2020–21 Radivoj Korać Cup =

2021 Triglav osiguranje^{1} Radivoj Korać Cup
Tournament details
- Country: Serbia
- City: Novi Sad
- Venue: SPC Vojvodina
- Dates: 11–14 February 2021
- Teams: 8
- Defending champions: Partizan NIS
- TV partner: Arena Sport

Final positions
- Champions: Crvena zvezda mts
- Runners-up: Mega Soccerbet
- Semifinalists: Vojvodina; Partizan NIS

Tournament statistics
- Matches played: 7
- Attendance: 150 (21 per match)
- Scoring leader(s): Filip Petrušev

Awards
- MVP: Marko Jagodić-Kuridža
- All statistics correct as of 15 February 2021 (UTC).^{1} Sponsored cup name, referring to Triglav Osiguranje

The 2021 Triglav osiguranje Radivoj Korać Cup was the 19th season of the Serbian men's national basketball cup tournament. The tournament was held in Novi Sad between 11–14 February 2021. All games will be played behind closed doors due to the COVID-19 pandemic in Serbia.

Partizan NIS was the three-time defending champion. Radnički Kragujevac, Mladost Zemun, and Vojvodina made their debuts at the national cup tournament. Crvena zvezda mts won its 7th Serbian Cup title following a 73–60 win over Mega Soccerbet.

== Qualified teams ==
| ABA League First Division | Basketball League of Serbia | 2nd-tier Cup of Serbia |
|---|---|---|
| Borac Čačak; Crvena zvezda mts FMP; Mega Soccerbet; Partizan NIS | Mladost Zemun (1st) ^{L} | Radnički Kragujevac; Vojvodina |

^{L} The league table position after 15 rounds played

=== Personnel and sponsorship ===
| Team | Head coach | Captain | Kit manufacturer | Shirt sponsor |
|---|---|---|---|---|
| Borac Čačak | (Serbia) Marko Marinović | (Serbia) Uroš Čarapić | — | P.S. Fashion |
| Crvena zvezda mts | (Montenegro) Dejan Radonjić | (Serbia) Branko Lazić | Adidas | mts |
| FMP | (Serbia) Bojan Đerić | (Serbia) Radoš Šešlija | Adidas | FMP |
| Mega Soccerbet | (Serbia) Vlada Jovanović | (Serbia) Milenko Tepić | Adidas | Soccerbet / Tehnomanija |
| Mladost Zemun | (Serbia) Dragan Jakovljević | (Serbia) Marko Milenković | Champion | — |
| Partizan NIS | (Slovenia) Sašo Filipovski | (Serbia) Novica Veličković | Under Armour | NIS / mts |
| Radnički Kragujevac | (Serbia) Ivica Vukotić | (Serbia) Raško Katić | Seven | City of Kragujevac |
| Vojvodina | (Serbia) Miroslav Nikolić | (Serbia) Krsto Bjelica | Peak | — |

== Venue ==
The tournament reportedly planned to have been played in Belgrade. However, it was announced that the tournament will be held in Novi Sad. It is the first time since 2004 that will be held in Novi Sad.

| Novi Sad | 2020–21 Radivoj Korać Cup (Serbia) |
| SPC Vojvodina | 2020–21 Radivoj Korać Cup (Serbia) |
| Capacity: 6,987 (Main Hall) / 1,030 (Small Hall) | 2020–21 Radivoj Korać Cup (Serbia) |

== Draw ==
The draw was conducted on Wednesday 3 February 2021 at the Arena Sport live show. It was held by former basketball players Željko Rebrača and Zoran Sretenović.

| Seeded teams Mega Soccerbet Crvena zvezda mts Partizan NIS FMP | Non-seeded teams Borac Čačak^{1} Mladost Zemun Vojvodina Radnički Kragujevac |

^{1} The lowest ABA League position after 13 rounds played

== Bracket ==
Quarterfinals
11 February
Mega Soccerbet | 93
Mladost Zemun | 69
11 February
FMP | 67
Vojvodina | 73
11 February
Partizan NIS | 76
Borac Čačak | 72
11 February
Crvena zvezda mts | 108
Radnički Kragujevac | 47

Semifinals
13 February
Mega Soccerbet | 82
Vojvodina | 75
13 February
Partizan NIS | 78
Crvena zvezda mts | 79

Final
14 February
Mega Soccerbet | 60
Crvena zvezda mts | 73

== Quarterfinals ==
All times are local UTC+1.

=== Mega Soccerbet v Mladost Zemun ===
11 February 2021
15:00

Boxscore

| Mega Soccerbet | 93–69 | Mladost Zemun |
Scoring by quarter: 31–14, 25–28, 20–14, 17–13
| Pts: Filip Petrušev 22; Rebs: Marko Simonović 16; Asts: Momirov, Smith 6 each | | Pts: Martins Igbanu 15; Rebs: Four players 5 each Asts: Aranitović, Mitchell 2 each |

SPC Vojvodina, Novi Sad
Attendance: Behind closed doors
Referees: Milivoje Jovčić, Vladimir Jevtović, Ivan Stefanović

=== FMP v Vojvodina ===
11 February 2021
17:00

Boxscore

| FMP | 67–73 | Vojvodina |
Scoring by quarter: 19–20, 13–18, 12–20, 23–15
| Pts: Stefan Đorđević 17; Rebs: Marko Radovanović 9 Asts: Filip Čović 7 | | Pts: Dušan Beslać 19; Rebs: Petar Rakićević 10; Asts: Petar Rakićević 5 |

SPC Vojvodina, Novi Sad
Attendance: 30
Referees: Uroš Nikolić, Uroš Obrknežević, Vladimir Vesković

It was the first time since the 2015 tournament that a BLS team won over an ABA team in the quarterfinals.

=== Partizan NIS v Borac Čačak ===
11 February 2021
19:00

Boxscore

| Partizan NIS | 76–72 | Borac Čačak |
Scoring by quarter: 20–16, 20–16, 22–17, 14–23
| Pts: Eric Mika 15; Rebs: Veličković, Thomas 6 each Asts: Ognjen Jaramaz 6 | | Pts: Bryce Jones 14; Rebs: Nenad Nerandžić 9 Asts: Bryce Jones 7 |

SPC Vojvodina, Novi Sad
Attendance: Behind closed doors
Referees: Ilija Belošević, Marko Juras, Aleksandar Glišić

=== Crvena zvezda mts v Radnički Kragujevac ===
11 February 2021
21:00

Boxscore

| Crvena zvezda mts | 108–47 | Radnički Kragujevac |
Scoring by quarter: 22–13, 27–12, 30–13, 29–9
| Pts: Branko Lazić 17; Rebs: Marko Jagodić-Kuridža 8 Asts: Aleksa Uskoković 6 | | Pts: Filip Dumić 19; Rebs: Matija Popović 8 Asts: Filip Dumić 4 |

SPC Vojvodina, Novi Sad
Attendance: 30
Referees: Siniša Prpa, Nemanja Ninković, Petar Pešić

== Semifinals ==
=== Mega Soccerbet v Vojvodina ===
13 February 2021
18:00

Boxscore

| Mega Soccerbet | 82–75 | Vojvodina |
Scoring by quarter: 25–11, 25–22, 11–20, 21–22
| Pts: Marko Simonović 18; Rebs: Filip Petrušev 13; Asts: Scoochie Smith 8 | | Pts: Nikola Gaćeša 22; Rebs: Nikola Gaćeša 7 Asts: Petar Rakićević 7 |

SPC Vojvodina, Novi Sad
Attendance: 30
Referees: Uroš Obrknežević, Marko Juras, Vladimir Jevtović

=== Partizan NIS v Crvena zvezda mts ===
13 February 2021
21:00

Boxscore

| Partizan NIS | 78–79 | Crvena zvezda mts |
Scoring by quarter: 27–22, 19–18, 12–15, 20–24
| Pts: Ognjen Jaramaz 18; Rebs: Rashawn Thomas 7 Asts: Ognjen Jaramaz 9 | | Pts: Jordan Loyd 24; Rebs: Ognjen Kuzmić 7 Asts: Davidovac, Uskoković 3 each |

SPC Vojvodina, Novi Sad
Attendance: 30
Referees: Ilija Belošević, Milivoje Jovčić, Uroš Nikolić

== Final ==
It is the first time since 2016 that Crvena Zvezda and Partizan won't play in the Final. Previously, Crvena zvezda and Mega played in the 2015 Final. Also, its fourth Cup Final for Mega.

14 February 2021
21:00

Boxscore

| Mega Soccerbet | 60–73 | Crvena zvezda mts |
Scoring by quarter: 21–19, 19–17, 8–17, 12–20
| Pts: Filip Petrušev 21; Rebs: Marko Simonović 7 Asts: Scoochie Smith 6 | | Pts: Davidovac, O'Bryant 14 each Rebs: Marko Jagodić-Kuridža 11; Asts: Dejan Davidovac 6 |

SPC Vojvodina, Novi Sad
Attendance: 30
Referees: Ilija Belošević, Milivoje Jovčić, Uroš Obrknežević

| Starters: | | | Pts | Reb | Ast |
|---|---|---|---|---|---|
| PG | 2 | (United States) Scoochie Smith | 7 | 0 | 6 |
| G | 9 | (Serbia) Stefan Momirov | 5 | 2 | 0 |
| G/F | 5 | (Serbia) Milenko Tepić | 4 | 0 | 3 |
| F/C | 3 | (Serbia) Filip Petrušev | 21 | 6 | 1 |
| C | 11 | (Montenegro) Marko Simonović | 12 | 7 | 1 |
| Reserves: | | | | | |
| SG | 0 | (Serbia) Nikola Jović | 0 | 1 | 0 |
| F | 1 | (Serbia) Nikola Mišković | DNP | | |
| PG | 12 | (Serbia) Mihailo Jovičić | DNP | | |
| G/F | 13 | (Serbia) Luka Cerovina | 0 | 3 | 1 |
| F/C | 17 | (Croatia) Karlo Matković | 6 | 0 | 0 |
| SG | 20 | (France) Malcolm Cazalon | 5 | 4 | 3 |
| PF | 30 | (Serbia) Aleksandar Langović | 0 | 0 | 0 |
Head coach:
(Basketball Federation of Serbia) Vlada Jovanović

| MEG | CZV |

| MEG | Statistics | CZV |
|---|---|---|
| 15–28 (53%) | 2-pt field goals | 13-30 (43%) |
| 6–20 (30%) | 3-pt field goals | 12–31 (38%) |
| 12–15 (80%) | Free throws | 11–17 (64%) |
| 2 | Offensive rebounds | 15 |
| 23 | Defensive rebounds | 26 |
| 25 | Total rebounds | 41 |
| 15 | Assists | 13 |
| 13 | Turnovers | 11 |
| 4 | Steals | 6 |
| 1 | Blocks | 1 |
| 20 (20) | Fouls | 20 (20) |

2020–21 Radivoj Korać Cup Champions
Crvena zvezda mts
7th title
MVP
(Serbia) Marko Jagodić-Kuridža

| Starters: | | | Pts | Reb | Ast |
|---|---|---|---|---|---|
| G/F | 7 | (Serbia) Dejan Davidovac | 14 | 2 | 6 |
| SG | 3 | (United States) Jordan Loyd | 9 | 5 | 1 |
| SF | 10 | (Serbia) Branko Lazić | 10 | 2 | 0 |
| PF | 21 | (Serbia) Marko Jagodić-Kuridža | 8 | 11 | 3 |
| F/C | 00 | (United States) Johnny O'Bryant III | 14 | 7 | 1 |
| Reserves: | | | | | |
| PG | 1 | (Serbia) Milutin Vujičić | DNP | | |
| PG | 4 | (Serbia) Aleksa Uskoković | 5 | 0 | 0 |
| SG | 12 | (Serbia) Aleksa Radanov | 0 | 1 | 0 |
| G/F | 13 | (Serbia) Ognjen Dobrić | 5 | 3 | 1 |
| F | 19 | (Serbia) Marko Simonović | 4 | 2 | 1 |
| PF | 22 | (Serbia) Boriša Simanić | DNP | | |
| C | 32 | (Serbia) Ognjen Kuzmić | 4 | 6 | 0 |
Head coach:
(Basketball Federation of Montenegro) Dejan Radonjić

== See also ==
- 2020–21 Basketball League of Serbia
- 2020–21 KK Crvena zvezda season
- 2020–21 KK Partizan season
- 2020–21 Milan Ciga Vasojević Cup
