= Aleksandar Matović =

Serbian basketball coach (born 1978)

Partizan Belgrade
- Position: Assistant coach
- League: Serbian SuperLeague; ABA League; EuroLeague

Personal information
- Born: 3 January 1978 (age 48) Čačak, SR Serbia, Yugoslavia

Career history

Coaching
- Superfund
- 2015–2016: AEK (assistant)
- 2016: Budućnost (assistant)
- 2017–2021: Partizan (assistant)
- 2017; 2018: Partizan (interim)
- 2021: Partizan
- 2021–present: Partizan (assistant)

Career highlights
- As assistant coach: 2× ABA League champion (2023, 2025); ABA League Supercup winner (2019); Serbian League champion (2025); 3× Serbian Cup winner (2018, 2019, 2020)
Medals
Men's basketball
Assistant coach for Serbia
U19 World Championship
Silver medal – second place	2011 Latvia	Team
U18 European Championship
Gold medal – first place	2007 Spain	Team

Aleksandar Matović (Serbian Cyrillic: Александар Матовић; born 3 January 1978) is a Serbian basketball coach who is currently an assistant coach for Partizan Belgrade of the Serbian SuperLeague, the ABA League and the EuroLeague.

== Coaching career ==
Matović started his coaching career as a youth coach for Borac Čačak and Partizan. Later, Matović was the head coach of Superfund.

In August 2015, Matović became an assistant coach of AEK under Dragan Šakota. In July 2016, he became an assistant coach for Budućnost under Vlado Šćepanović.

Individually through the years, Matović was a player development coach for many NBA players, such as Klay Thompson, Mychel Thompson, Goran Dragić, Zoran Dragić, Semih Erden, Sasha Vujačić, Andris Biedriņš, and Vladimir Radmanović.

=== Partizan (2017–present) ===
In summer 2017, Matović became an assistant coach for Partizan NIS under Miroslav Nikolić. In mid-December 2017, Matović was the interim head coach for Partizan following departure of coach Nikolić. On 13 December, he coached the Partizan team in a 83–67 loss to RETAbet Bilbao Basket. On the next day, Matović joined staff of Nenad Čanak who was hired as the new Partizan head coach.

In October 2018, Matović was named the interim head coach for Partizan following departure of coach Čanak. On 31 October, Matović had a 77–72 loss to Turk Telecom. Matović finished his second stint as the interim head coach with one lost when new head coach Andrea Trinchieri was hired on 1 November, joining his coaching staff as assistant.

On 8 March 2021, Partizan NIS hired Matović as their new head coach for the rest of the 2020–21 season. Two days later, he made his official debut in a 75–70 loss to Metropolitans 92. Following this lost, Partizan was eliminated in the Top 16 stage of the 2020–21 EuroCup season. He left the head coach position in June 2021, following arrival of the new head coach Željko Obradović. In August, he was named back as an assistant coach for Partizan under Obradović.

=== National teams ===
In June 2021, Matović was added to the coaching staff of Serbia men's national team under Igor Kokoškov as a player development coach.

== Career achievements ==
As assistant coach

- Serbian Cup winner: 3 (with Partizan: 2017–18, 2018–19, 2019–20)
- ABA Super Cup winner: 1 (with Partizan: 2019)
- Adriatic League champion: 2 (with Partizan: 2022–23, 2024–25)
- Serbian League champion: 1 (with Partizan: 2024–25)

== Coaching record ==
=== EuroCup ===
Team	Year	G	W	L	W–L%	Result
Partizan	2017–18	1	0	1	.000	Interim head coach
Partizan	2018–19	1	0	1	.000	Interim head coach
Partizan	2020–21	1	0	1	.000	Eliminated in Top 16 stage
Career		3	0	3	.000	

== See also ==
- List of KK Partizan head coaches
