= Nikola Radovanović =

Serbian basketball player (born 2003)

No. 33 – Pepperdine Waves
- Position: Small forward
- League: West Coast Conference

Personal information
- Born: 13 March 2003 (age 23) Nevesinje, Republika Srpska, Bosnia and Herzegovina
- Listed height: 2.04 m (6 ft 8 in)
- Listed weight: 86 kg (190 lb)

Career information
- College: Pepperdine (2025–present)
- Playing career: 2018–present

Career history
- 2018–2019: Budućnost Bijeljina
- 2020–2022: Partizan
- 2020–2021: →Slodes
- 2021–2022: →Dunav
- 2022: →Mladost Zemun
- 2024–2025: Sloboda Užice

Nikola Radovanović (Serbian Cyrillic: Никола Радовановић, born 13 March 2003) is a Serbian college basketball player for the Pepperdine Waves of the West Coast Conference (WCC).

== Early career ==
Radovanović started to play basketball in his hometown team Velež. In 2015, he joined Budućnost from Bijeljina. As 15-years-old, Radovanović played for Budućnost Bijeljina in the R Srpska First League during the 2018–19 season, averaging 18 points per game. In January 2019, Radovanović moved to Belgrade, Serbia joining the youth system of Partizan NIS. Afterward, Budućnost accused Partizan for "stealing" of their young prospect Radovanović. Radovanović played for the Partizan U19 team in the 2019–20 Junior ABA League on all five games, averaging 14.6 points, 6.2 rebounds and 1.2 assists per game. In summer 2020, Radovanović was loaned to Slodes for the 2020–21 Serbian Second League. Over six games, he averaged 3.5 points and 5.7 rebounds per game.

== Professional career ==
In February 2021, Radovanović was added to the Partizan NIS roster for the rest of the 2020–21 season. On 27 February, he made his professional debut in a 96–94 loss to Zadar, recording 3 points and two rebounds in 12 minutes of playing time. On 10 March, Radovanović appeared for 12 seconds in a 75–70 loss to Metropolitans 92, making his EuroCup debut without a record. In September 2021, he joined Dunav as a two-affiliate player. In November 2022, he was loaned to Mladost Zemun.

== National team career ==
Radovanović was a member of the Serbian under-16 national team that participated at the 2019 FIBA U16 European Championship in Udine, Italy. Over seven tournament games, he averaged 15.1 points, 7.3 rebounds and 1.3 assists per game.
