= Sport Klub =

Sportklub
- Broadcast area: Croatia; Slovenia

Programming
- Picture format: 1080i (HDTV) (SK 1–12, Golf, Fight and Esports)

Ownership
- Owner: United Group

History
- Launched: 2 January 2006; 20 years ago

Links
- Website: sportklub.com

Former logo (2006–2013)

Sportklub, formerly rendered as Sport Klub, is a subscription sports television service which has been broadcast in Slovenia since 2006, and Croatia from 2007.

Sportklub broadcast many different sporting events including football, basketball, tennis, American football, ice hockey, volleyball, handball, athletics, and golf among others. The programmes were transmitted in Croatian and Slovenian.

The channel was launched by IKO Media Group in 2006, and was later sold to various companies. Today it is owned by United Group. It was formerly available in Bosnia and Herzegovina (2006—2026), Serbia (2006—2025), Montenegro (2006—2025), North Macedonia (2011—2025), Hungary (2006–2016) and Romania (2006–2012).

On 11 February 2025 the state-owned company, Telekom Srbija, bought the rights to all broadcasts on the territory of the Serbia from Sportklub. On 3 April 2025 all broadcasts were transferred to Telekom's Arena Sport channels. The Sportklub TV channel on the territories of Bosnia and Herzegovina, Serbia, Montenegro and North Macedonia was shut down, but the website and accounts on social networks continued to work.

For the territories of Croatia and Slovenia, Sport Klub has television rights to the following events:

== Football ==
UEFA

- (Europe) UEFA Champions League (Slovenia only)
- (Europe) UEFA Europa League (Slovenia only)
- (Europe) UEFA Europa Conference League (Slovenia only)
- (Europe) UEFA Super Cup (Slovenia only)
- FIFA World Cup qualification
- (Europe) UEFA European Championship qualifying
- (Europe) UEFA Nations League

CONCACAF

- CONCACAF Champions League
- CONCACAF Nations League

CAF

- CAF Champions League
- Africa Cup of Nations

AFC

- AFC Champions League
- AFC Cup
- AFC Asian Cup

Leagues:

- (Spain) La Liga
- (Germany) German Bundesliga
- Netherlands Eredivise
- (Portugal) Portuguese Primeira Liga
- (Turkey) Turkish Süper Lig
- (Austria) Austrian Bundesliga
- (Switzerland) Swiss Super League
- Norway Eliteserien
- (Denmark) Danish Superliga
- (Czech Republic) Czech First League
- Super League Greece
- (Sweden) Swedish Allsvenskan
- (Bulgaria) Bulgarian First League
- (Slovakia) Slovak Super Liga
- (Slovenia) Slovenian PrvaLiga
- Kazakhstan Premier League
- (Lithuania) Lithuanian A Lyga
- (Georgia (country)) Georgian Erovnuli Liga
- (Belarus) Belarusian Premier League
- (North Macedonia) Macedonian First League
- (Italy) Italian Serie B
- (Germany) German 2. Bundesliga
- (Germany) German 3. Liga
- Turkey Second League
- (Slovenia) Slovenian Second League
- (South Korea) K League 1
- (Saudi Arabia) Saudi Professional League

Cups:

- (Netherlands) KNVB Cup
- (Portugal) Portuguese Cup
- (Turkey) Turkish Cup
- (Scotland) Scottish Cup
- (Denmark) Danish Cup
- (Romania) Romanian Cup
- (Bulgaria) Bulgarian Cup
- (Slovenia) Slovenian Cup
- (Slovakia) Slovak Cup
- (Saudi Arabia) Saudi King Cup
- (Germany) DFL-Supercup
- Netherlands Super Cup
- (Portugal) Portuguese Super Cup
- (Turkey) Turkish Super Cup
- (Saudi Arabia) Saudi Super Cup

== Basketball ==
FIBA

- 2027 FIBA Basketball World Cup

Leagues:

- (United States) (Canada) NBA
- (European Union) Euroleague
- (European Union) EuroCup
- (United States) (Canada) NCAA
- (Spain) Liga Endesa
- (Germany) German Bundesliga
- (Israel) Israeli Premier League
- (Lithuania) Lithuanian Basketball League
- (Slovenia) Slovenian Premier A League
- (Australia) Australian National League

Cups:

- (Spain) Copa del Rey
- (Germany) BBL-Pokal
- (Israel) Israeli League Cup
- (Lithuania) King Mindaugas Cup
- (Slovenia) Slovenian Cup
- (Spain) Supercopa de España
- (Slovenia) Slovenian Supercup

== Tennis ==
- (United Nations) Wimbledon
- (United Nations) ATP Masters 1000
- (United Nations) ATP 500
- (United Nations) ATP 250
- (United Nations) ATP Finals
- (United Nations) WTA Tour

== Motosport ==
- (United Nations) Moto GP
- (United Nations) Moto 2
- (United Nations) Moto 3
- (United States) NASCAR

== Volleyball ==
- (European Union) Men's Nations League
- (European Union) Women's Nations League
- (Poland) Polish PlusLiga
- (Italy) Italian Men's Volleyball League
- (Italy) Italian Women's Volleyball League
- (Turkey) Turkish Men's Volleyball League
- (Turkey) Turkish Women's Volleyball League
- (Slovenia) Slovenian Men's Volleyball League
- (Slovenia) Slovenian Women's Volleyball League
- (Germany) German Bundesliga

== Handball ==
- (Germany) German Bundesliga
- (Hungary) Hungarian League
- (Poland) Polish Superliga
- (Slovenia) Slovenian First League

Cups:

- (Germany) DHB-Pokal
- (Hungary) Hungarian Cup
- (Poland) Polish Cup
- (Slovenia) Slovenian Cup
- (Germany) DHB-Supercup
- (Slovenia) Slovenian Supercup

== American football ==
- (United States) College football
- (United States) UFL
- (European Union) CEFL
- (Serbia) Serbian National League

== Athletics ==
- (United Nations) Diamond League

== Water polo ==
- (European Union) LEN Champions League

== Nova Sport ==
On 4 December 2019, The United Group launched a secondary sports channel named Nova Sport.
