= Scoochie Smith =

American basketball player (born 1994)

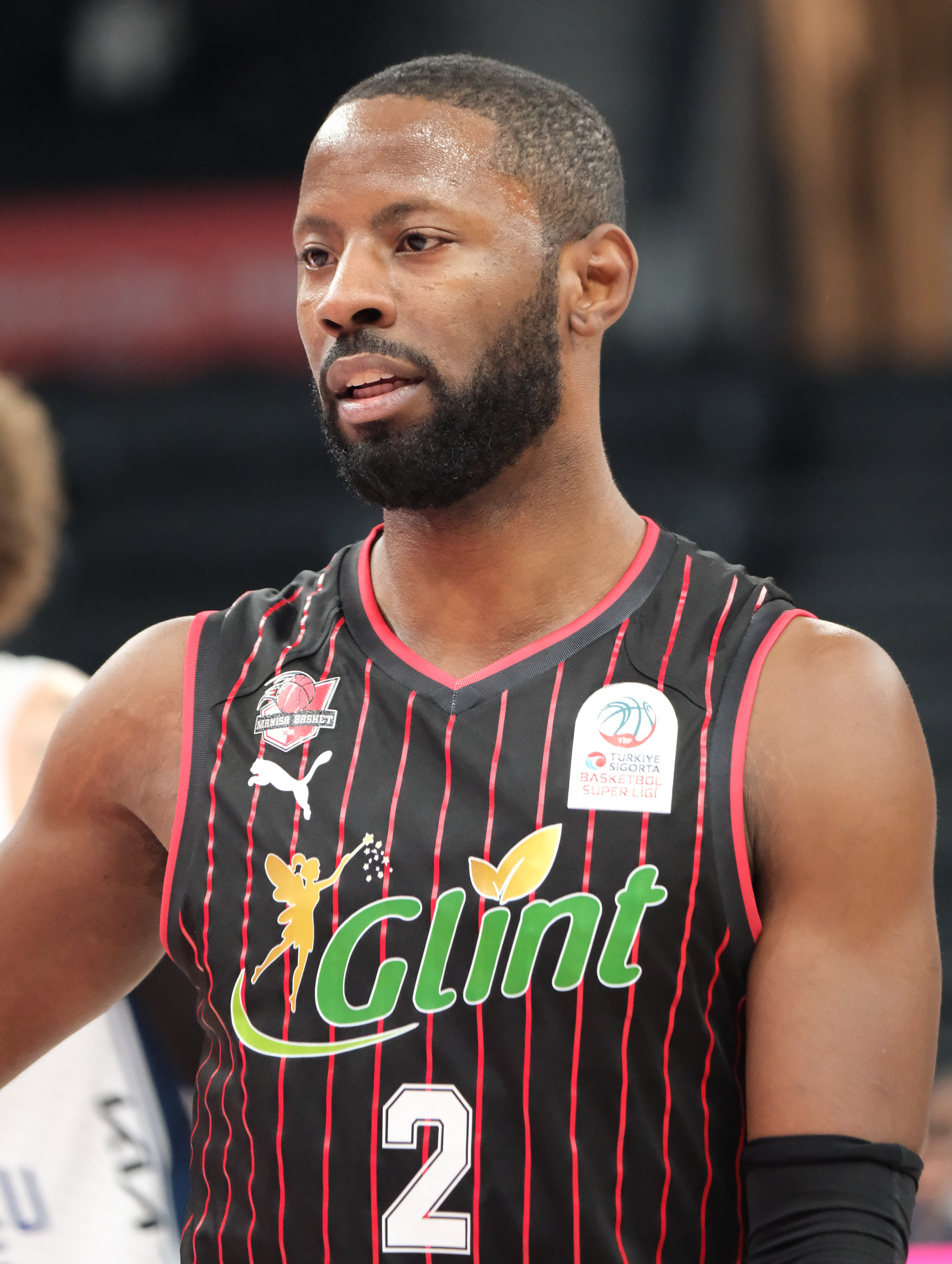
- Smith with Körfez Basket in 2025

No. 11 – Gaziantep Basketbol
- Position: Point guard
- League: TBL

Personal information
- Born: November 11, 1994 (age 32) The Bronx, New York, U.S.
- Listed height: 6 ft 2 in (1.88 m)
- Listed weight: 185 lb (84 kg)

Career information
- High school: Putnam Science Academy (Putnam, Connecticut)
- College: Dayton (2013–2017)
- NBA draft: 2017: undrafted
- Playing career: 2017–present

Career history
- 2017–2018: Cairns Taipans
- 2018–2019: Canton Charge
- 2019–2020: Peristeri
- 2020: Fort Wayne Mad Ants
- 2020–2022: Mega Basket
- 2022–2023: Start Lublin
- 2023–2024: Juventus Utena
- 2024–2025: KK Vojvodina
- 2025–2026: Manisa Basket
- 2026–present: Gaziantep

Career highlights
- All-LKL Team (2024); First-team All-Atlantic 10 (2017)
- Stats at Basketball Reference

Dayshon "Scoochie" Smith (born November 11, 1994) is an American professional basketball player for Gaziantep Basketbol of the Türkiye Basketbol Ligi (TBL). He played college basketball for the Dayton Flyers.

== College career ==
Smith was given his unusual nickname by his grandfather. He averaged 3.6 points and 2.0 assists per game as a freshman at Dayton, playing as a backup to Khari Price. He improved his averages to 9.2 points and 3.8 assists per game as a sophomore. As a junior, he posted 11.7 points and 4.3 assists per game. Smith averaged 13.8 points and to 4.5 rebounds per game as a senior and shot 38.8 percent from 3-point range. He was named to the First-team All-Atlantic 10.

== Professional career ==
After graduating from Dayton, Smith signed with the Cairns Taipans of the Australian National Basketball League (NBL). He averaged 10.2 points and 2.3 assists per game in 27 games.

In March 2018, he was signed by the Canton Charge. In eight games, Smith averaged 14.3 points, 8.1 assists and 4.3 rebounds per game. He joined the Cleveland Cavaliers in the 2018 NBA summer League. He played for the Cavaliers' affiliate, the Canton Charge, and averaged 12.2 points, 4.6 rebounds, and 6.2 assists per game.

On April 12, 2019, Smith signed with Peristeri for the Greek Basket League play-offs. On September 24, 2019, Smith re-signed his contract with the Greek club after averaging 3.7 points and 2.6 assists per game in his first season. In his second season in Greece, Smith averaged 6.8 points and 3.2 assists per game.

On February 2, 2020, he was acquired from Canton by the Fort Wayne Mad Ants in exchange for Omari Johnson.

Smith signed with Mega Bemax of the Basketball League of Serbia on June 4, 2020.

On September 25, 2022, he signed with Start Lublin of the PLK.

On August 14, 2023, Smith signed a one-year deal with Juventus Utena of the Lithuanian Basketball League (LKL). He was named to the All-LKL Team after averaging 12.8 points, 5.7 assists and 2.3 steals in 34 games.

On August 26, 2025, he signed with Körfez Basket of the Basketbol Süper Ligi (BSL).

On August 8, 2026, he signed with Gaziantep Basketbol of the Türkiye Basketbol Ligi (TBL).
