= Martins Igbanu =

Nigerian basketball player

Personal information
- Born: April 12, 1997 (age 29) Lagos, Nigeria
- Listed height: 6 ft 8 in (2.03 m)
- Listed weight: 235 lb (107 kg)

Career information
- High school: Covenant Christian Ministries Academy (Marietta, Georgia)
- College: Tulsa (2016–2020)
- NBA draft: 2020: undrafted
- Playing career: 2020–present
- Position: Small forward

Career history
- 2020–2021: Mladost Zemun
- 2021: Denain Voltaire Basket
- 2021–2022: Rouen Métropole Basket
- 2022: Caen Basket Calvados
- 2022–2023: BC Boncourt
- 2023: Niigata Albirex BB
- 2024: Tokyo Hachioji Bee Trains

Career highlights
- First-team All-AAC (2020); AAC Sixth Man of the Year (2020)

Martins Igbanu (born April 12, 1997) is a Nigerian professional basketball player who last played for Tokyo Hachioji Bee Trains of the B.League. He played college basketball for the Tulsa Golden Hurricane.

== Early life ==
Igbanu grew up in Lagos, Nigeria and played soccer as a child. At the age of 14, he decided to try basketball and practiced every day at Rowe Park. When he was 15, Igbanu came to the United States and enrolled at Covenant Christian Ministries Academy in Marietta, Georgia. He initially felt homesick and was planning to travel back to Nigeria when his mother convinced him to stay longer. As a senior, he averaged 19.5 points, 9.3 rebounds, 2.1 assists, 1.8 steals and 1.0 block per game. In September 2015, Igbanu committed to play at Tulsa over offers from Cincinnati, Iowa State and Tennessee. "I wanted to go to a good school where I could play basketball and also receive the best education, like TU offers," he said.

== College career ==
Igbanu averaged 6.3 points and 4 rebounds per game while shooting 55.9 percent from the floor as a freshman. As a sophomore, he averaged 9.4 points and 5.1 rebounds per game, shooting and 52.9 percent from the field. Igbanu averaged 12.5 points and 5.7 rebounds per game as a junior. After struggling during nonconference play of his senior season, Igbanu began coming off the bench and his scoring improved. On February 9, 2020, he scored a career-high 30 points in an 83–75 loss to UCF. As a senior, Igbanu averaged 13.6 points and 5.0 rebounds per game. He earned First Team All-American Athletic Conference as well as conference Sixth Man of the Year honors.

== Professional career ==
On September 16, 2020, Igbanu signed his first professional contract with Mladost Zemun of the Adriatic League and the Basketball League of Serbia. He averaged 12.4 points, 6.0 rebounds and 1.0 assist per game in the Serbian league. On July 9, 2021, Igbanu signed with Denain Voltaire Basket of the LNB Pro B. On November 3, he signed with Rouen Métropole Basket. Igbanu signed with Caen Basket Calvados of the Nationale Masculine 1 on January 3, 2022.

== Career statistics ==
Legend
GP	Games played	GS	Games started	MPG	Minutes per game
FG%	Field goal percentage	3P%	3-point field goal percentage	FT%	Free throw percentage
RPG	Rebounds per game	APG	Assists per game	SPG	Steals per game
BPG	Blocks per game	PPG	Points per game	**Bold**	Career high

=== College ===
Year	Team	GP	GS	MPG	FG%	3P%	FT%	RPG	APG	SPG	BPG	PPG
2016–17	Tulsa	**32**	19	15.3	.559	**.556**	.589	4.0	.3	.2	**.3**	6.3
2017–18	Tulsa	31	23	22.5	.529	.286	**.720**	5.1	.5	.3	.2	9.4
2018–19	Tulsa	**32**	**32**	**27.1**	**.616**	.000	.661	**5.7**	.7	**.6**	**.3**	12.5
2019–20	Tulsa	31	12	26.6	.561	.333	.691	5.0	**.8**	.5	**.3**	**13.6**
Career		126	86	22.9	.570	.333	.670	5.0	.6	.4	.3	10.4
