= Nenad Nerandžić =

Serbian basketball player

Free Agent
- Position: Power forward / small forward

Personal information
- Born: 19 June 1996 (age 30) Belgrade, FR Yugoslavia
- Listed height: 2.03 m (6 ft 8 in)

Career information
- NBA draft: 2018: undrafted
- Playing career: 2016–present

Career history
- 2016–2018: Beovuk 72
- 2018–2019: Metalac
- 2019–2021: Borac Čačak
- 2021–2022: FMP
- 2022–2024: Igokea

Career highlights
- Bosnian League champion (2023); Bosnian Cup winner (2023)

Nenad Nerandžić (Serbian Cyrillic: Ненад Неранџић; born 19 June 1996) is a Serbian professional basketball player who last played for Igokea of the ABA League.

== Playing career ==
Nerandžić played for Beovuk 72, Metalac, and Borac Čačak, all of the Serbian League.

On 12 June 2021, Nerandžić signed a two-year contract with FMP. In December 2022, he signed with Igokea for the rest of the 2022–23 season. He also played at the FIBA 3x3 World Tour.
