= Radovan Đoković =

Serbian basketball player

União Corinthians
- Position: Guard

Personal information
- Born: 26 March 1996 (age 30) Belgrade, Serbia, FR Yugoslavia
- Listed height: 1.98 m (6 ft 6 in)
- Listed weight: 81 kg (179 lb)

Career information
- NBA draft: 2018: undrafted
- Playing career: 2012–present

Career history
- 2012–2017: Mega Basket
- 2014: → Napredak Kruševac
- 2015–2016: → Jagodina
- 2017: → Tamiš
- 2017–2018: OKK Beograd
- 2018: FMP
- 2018–2022: Borac Čačak
- 2022–2023: Mornar
- 2023–present: União Corinthians
- BCMU FC ARGES PITESTI / highlights =
Medals
Men's basketball
Representing Serbia
U18 European Championship
Silver medal – second place	2014 Turkey	Team

Radovan Đoković (Serbian Cyrillic: Радован Ђоковић; born 26 March 1996) is a Serbian professional basketball player for União Corinthians of the Brazilian League.

== Professional career ==
=== Mega Basket (2012–17) ===
Đoković started his professional career with Mega in 2012–13 season and stayed with the club until the end of 2016–17 season. Over that timespan, he was loaned to several clubs, including Napredak Kruševac, Jagodina and Tamiš.

=== 2017–18 ===
For 2017-18 season, he signed with OKK Beograd, and in 2018 played with FMP Belgrade.

=== Borac Čačak (2018–22) ===
In 2018, he signed a contract with Borac Čačak. In his first season with the team, Đoković averaged 13.5 points, 3 assists and 3.3 rebounds while shooting 45.8% from the field. He led Borac Čačak to promotion of regional top-tier competition in 2019–20 season. Over the season, he averaged 14 points, 3.4 assists and 2.9 rebounds over 20 games played while shooting 47.3 from the field goal. In 2020–21 season, in January 2021 he suffered a season-ending injury against Budućnost. He appeared in 11 games including that game, averaging 6.6 points and 2.5 assists while shooting 27.6% from the field.

He returned to the action during the 2021–22 season, and appeared in 11 games, averaging 5.6 points on 34.7% shooting from the field. On 4 August 2022, Đoković signed one-year contract extension with Borac Čačak. On 19 December 2022, he parted ways with Borac.

=== Mornar Bar (2022–23) ===
On 28 December 2022, Đoković signed a contract with the Montenegrin club Mornar until the end of the season. Over the 2022–23 season, he averaged 5.2 points on 32.7% shooting from the field, with 2.9 assists and 1.9 rebounds over 24 games.

=== União Corinthians (2023–present) ===
For 2023–24 season, Đoković signed with the Brazilian club União Corinthians.
