= Rashawn Thomas =

American basketball player (born 1994)

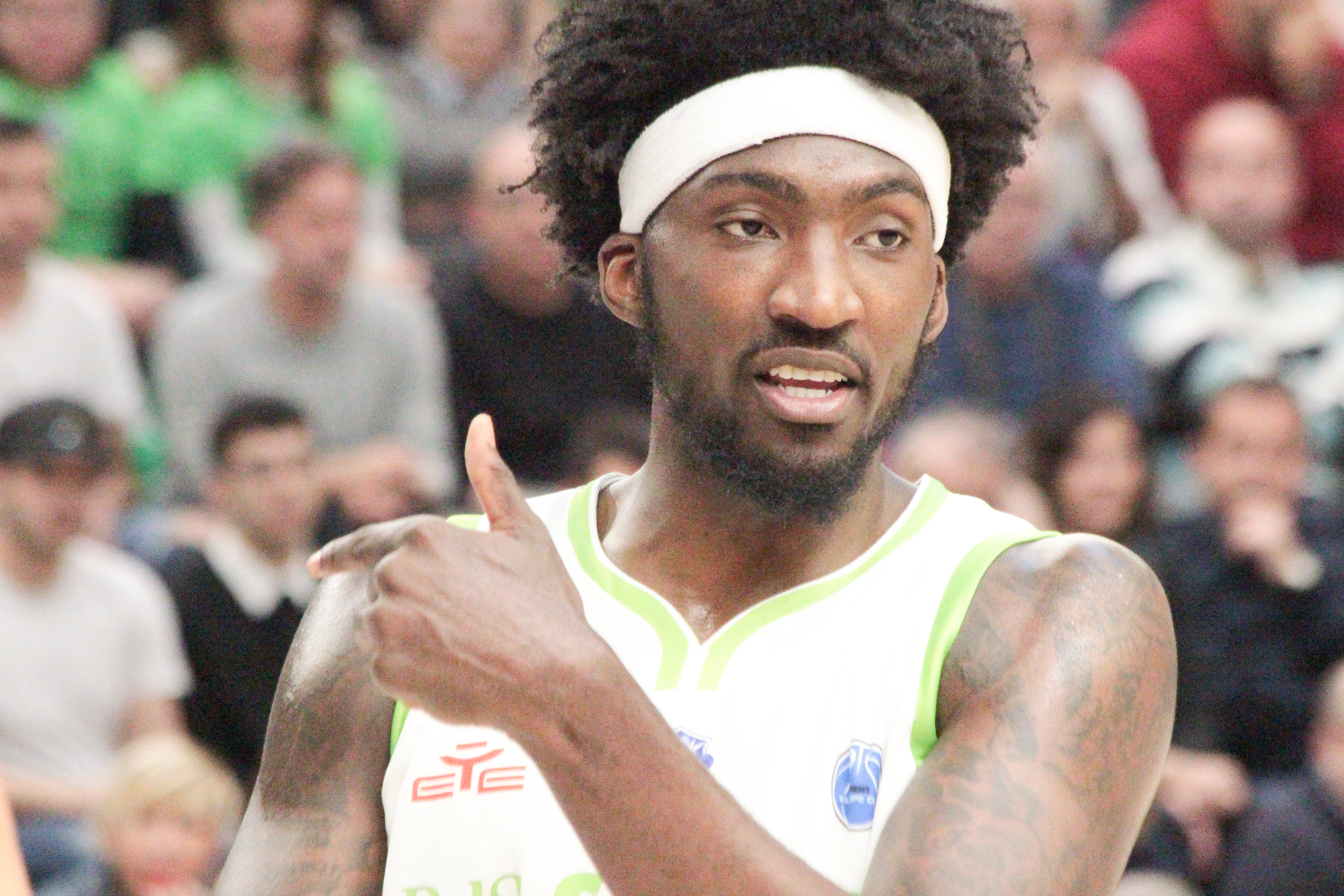
- Thomas in the finals of FIBA Europe Cup

No. 25 – Anyang Jung Kwan Jang Red Boosters
- Position: Power forward
- League: KBL

Personal information
- Born: August 15, 1994 (age 32) Oklahoma City, Oklahoma, U.S.
- Listed height: 6 ft 8 in (2.03 m)
- Listed weight: 230 lb (104 kg)

Career information
- High school: Southeast (Oklahoma City, Oklahoma)
- College: Texas A&M–Corpus Christi (2013–2017)
- NBA draft: 2017: undrafted
- Playing career: 2017–present

Career history
- 2017–2018: Oklahoma City Blue
- 2018–2019: Dinamo Sassari
- 2019–2021: Partizan Belgrade
- 2021–2022: Ulsan Hyundai Mobis Phoebus
- 2022–2024: Sendai 89ers
- 2024–2025: Fujian Sturgeons
- 2025–2026: Dinamo Sassari
- 2026–present: Anyang Jung Kwan Jang Red Boosters

Career highlights
- EuroCup steals leader (2021); FIBA Europe Cup champion (2019); ABA League Supercup MVP (2019); Southland Defensive Player of the Year (2016); 2× All-Southland (2016, 2017); Serbian Cup winner (2020); ABA League Supercup winner (2019)
- Stats at Basketball Reference

Rashawn Shaquille Thomas (born August 15, 1994) is an American professional basketball player for Anyang Jung Kwan Jang Red Boosters of the Korean Basketball League (KBL). He played college basketball for Texas A&M–Corpus Christi.

== High school career ==
Thomas attended Southeast High School in Oklahoma City, Oklahoma He was an Oklahoman All-State selection in 2013.

== College career ==
As a sophomore he was named to the Second Team All-Southland. As a junior, he was named Southland Defensive Player of the Year and was selected to the First Team All-Southland. He had 73 blocks, an Islander single season record, and nine double doubles, which led the conference. In a game against Texas State on December 5, 2015, Thomas pulled down 19 rebounds. Thomas averaged 16.6 points, 8.0 rebounds, and 2.3 blocks per game as a junior. Thomas scored 23 points in a 79–61 win over UMBC in the semifinals of the 2017 CollegeInsider.com Tournament. He surpassed the 2,000 point mark in his career, becoming the first Islander to do so. He averaged 22.5 points and 9.0 rebounds per game, and shot 53.4 percent from the field as a senior and repeated on the First Team All-Southland. Thomas participated in the Portsmouth Invitational Tournament, where he averaged 14 points in three games. For his career he averaged 16.3 points and 7.7 rebounds per game.

== Professional career ==
After not being selected in the 2017 NBA draft, he signed a partially guaranteed deal with the Oklahoma City Thunder and competed for them in the NBA Summer League. However, he was cut by the Thunder before appearing in a regular season game. Instead, he signed with their affiliate, the Oklahoma City Blue of the NBA G League. In 36 games, Thomas averaged 13.5 points, 6.8 rebounds, 2.6 assists, and 1.5 steals per game.

On July 30, 2018, Thomas signed a deal with the Italian club Dinamo Sassari for the 2018–19 LBA season.

On July 9, 2019, Thomas signed a two-year deal with Serbian club Partizan Belgrade. He was arrested in July 2019 for drug possession. In July 2021, Thomas signed with Ulsan Hyundai Mobis Phoebus of the Korean Basketball League.

On January 28, 2025, he signed with Dinamo Sassari in the Italian Lega Basket Serie A (LBA) for a second stint. Thomas re-signed with the team on May 14.

== International career ==
In February 2018, Thomas was selected to the NBA G League USA roster for the NBA G League International Challenge.
