= Arena Sport =

Pay television sports network

- Broadcast area: Bosnia and Herzegovina; Croatia; Montenegro; North Macedonia; Serbia; Slovenia; Kosovo

Programming
- Picture format: 1080i HDTV (downscaled to 16:9 576i for the SDTV feeds)

Ownership
- Owner: Telekom Srbija

History
- Launched: 2009; 17 years ago 2020 (Slovenia); 2026 (North Macedonia)

Links
- Website: tvarenasport.ba (BIH) tvarenasport.hr (CRO) tvarenasport.mk (MKD) tvarenasport.com (SRB | MNE) tvarenasport.si (SVN)

Arena Sport is a regional pay television sports network. It consists of five premium, ten regular, and six special channels. Its coverage area includes Bosnia and Herzegovina, Croatia, Montenegro, North Macedonia, Serbia, Kosovo and Slovenia. The network broadcast various types of sports such as association football, basketball, handball, American football, ice hockey, baseball, motorsports, volleyball, and rugby. It is owned by Telekom Srbija. Channels are available in HD technology.

== History ==
Arena Sport launched its first channel, Arena Sport 1, on 27 August 2009, while Arena Sport 2 was launched on 4 September of the same year. Arena Sport 3, Arena Sport 4 and Arena Sport 5 were later launched, while Arena Esport, specializing in e-sports broadcasts, was launched in 2020, when the channel dedicated to martial arts, Arena Fight, was launched.[1] Arena Sport 1x2 was launched shortly after. Arena Sport 6, Arena Sport 7 and Arena Sport 8 channels began operating on 6 September 2021, while Arena Sport 9 and Arena Sport 10 channels were launched on 26 September 2022. On 29 July 2025, specialized channels, Arena Tennis and Adrenalin, were launched.

Arena Channels Group launched the first premium channels in its portfolio on October 24, 2021, namely the Arena Premium 1, Arena Premium 2 and Arena Premium 3 channels. After the closure of the Sport Klub in the Western Balkans on April 3, 2025, all its content was transferred to Arena Sport. On July 29, 2025, Arena Premium 4, Arena Premium 5, as well as the first thematic channels — Arena Adrenaline and Arena Tennis — began operating. In mid-June 2026, Arena Sport channels begin broadcasts as Arena M Premium with Macedonian Language on the territories of North Macedonia.

== Sport events ==
=== Football ===
- (United Nations) 2025 FIFA Club World Cup
- (United Nations) 2026 FIFA World Cup (except Croatia)
- (United Nations) 2024 FIFA Intercontinental Cup

==== International competitions ====
- (Europe) UEFA Champions League (except Slovenia)
- (Europe) UEFA Europa League (except Slovenia)
- (Europe) UEFA Europa Conference League (except Slovenia)
- (Europe) UEFA Super Cup (except Slovenia)
- (Europe) UEFA Youth League (except Slovenia)
- (Europe) FIFA World Cup 2026 qualification (UEFA) (except Croatia and Slovenia)
- (Europe) UEFA Euro 2028 qualifying (except Croatia and Slovenia)
- (Europe) UEFA Nations League (except Croatia and Slovenia)

==== Africa ====
- (African Union) Africa Cup of Nations

==== Leagues ====
- (England) Premier League
- (Spain) La Liga (except Croatia and Slovenia)
- (Italy) Serie A
- (Italy) Serie B
- (Germany) Bundesliga (except Croatia and Slovenia)
- (France) Ligue 1
- (Netherlands) Eredivisie (except Croatia and Slovenia)
- (Portugal) Primeira Liga
- (Turkey) Süper Lig
- Super League Greece
- (Norway) Eliteserien
- (Austria) Austrian Bundesliga (except Croatia and Slovenia)
- (Scotland) Scottish Premiership
- (Poland) Ekstraklasa
- (Denmark) Danish Superliga (except Croatia and Slovenia)
- (Brazil) Brasileirão Série A
- (Switzerland) Swiss Super League (except Croatia and Slovenia)
- 1. HNL (except Croatia)
- (Sweden) Allsvenskan
- (Serbia) SuperLiga
- (Romania) Liga I
- (Russia) Russian Premier League
- Slovenian PrvaLiga (except Croatia and Slovenia)
- (Slovakia) Slovak First League
- (Bulgaria) First Professional League (except Croatia and Slovenia)
- (Bosnia and Herzegovina) Bosnian Premier League
- (Montenegro) Montenegrin First League
- (North Macedonia) Macedonian First League (Arena M Premium)
- (Argentina) Argentine Primera División
- (England) EFL Championship
- (England) EFL League One
- (England) EFL League Two
- (Spain) Segunda División
- (Germany) 2. Bundesliga (except Croatia and Slovenia)
- (Germany) 3. Liga (except Croatia and Slovenia)
- (France) Ligue 2
- (Turkey) TFF 1. Lig
- (Scotland) Scottish Championship
- (Serbia) Serbian First League
- (Slovenia) Slovenian Second League
- (Bulgaria) Second Professional League
- (Saudi Arabia) Saudi Pro League

==== Cups ====
- (Union of South American Nations) Copa Libertadores
- (Union of South American Nations) Copa Sudamericana
- (England) FA Cup
- (England) EFL Cup
- (Italy) Coppa Italia
- (Spain) Copa del Rey
- (Germany) DFB-Pokal
- Coupe de France
- (Netherlands) KNVB Cup
- Taça de Portugal
- (Turkey) Turkish Cup
- (Greece) Greek Cup
- (Scotland) Scottish Cup
- (Poland) Polish Cup
- (Denmark) Danish Cup
- (Serbia) Serbian Cup
- (Romania) Cupa României
- (Bulgaria) Bulgarian Cup
- Slovenian Cup (except Croatia and Slovenia)
- (Slovakia) Slovak Cup
- (Bosnia and Herzegovina) Bosnian Cup
- (Montenegro) Montenegrin Cup
- (Saudi Arabia) King's Cup
- (England) FA Community Shield
- (Italy) Supercoppa Italiana
- (Spain) Supercopa de España
- (Germany) DFL-Supercup (except Croatia and Slovenia)
- (France) Trophée des Champions
- (Netherlands) Johan Cruyff Shield
- (Portugal) Supertaça Cândido de Oliveira (except Croatia and Slovenia)
- (Turkey) Turkish Super Cup
- (Croatia) Croatian Super Cup
- (Bosnia and Herzegovina) Bosnian Supercup
- (Russia) Russian Super Cup
- (Saudi Arabia) Saudi Super Cup

==== America ====
- CONCACAF Gold Cup
- (Union of South American Nations) Copa América

=== Basketball ===
==== International competitions ====
- (European Union) EuroBasket 2025
- (European Union) 2027 World Cup qualification
- (United Nations) 2027 World Cup

==== Leagues ====
- (United States) (Canada) NBA (except Croatia and Slovenia)
- (United States) (Canada) NCAA
- (European Union) EuroLeague
- (European Union) EuroCup
- (European Union) Champions League
- (European Union) ABA League
- (Spain) Liga ACB
- (Greece) Greek League
- (Turkey) Süper Ligi
- (Italy) Serie A
- (France) LNB Élite
- (Germany) Bundesliga
- (Israel) Premier League
- (Russia) (Kazakhstan) VTB United League
- (Serbia) Serbian league
- (European Union) ABA League 2

==== Cups ====
- (Spain) Copa del Rey
- (Greece) Greek Cup
- (Turkey) Turkish Cup
- (Italy) Italian Basketball Cup
- (France) French Cup
- (Germany) BBL-Pokal
- (Israel) Israeli Cup
- (Serbia) Radivoj Korać Cup
- (Spain) Supercopa de España
- (Greece) Greek Super Cup
- (Turkey) Turkish Presidential Cup
- (Italy) Italian Supercup
- (Russia) (Kazakhstan) VTB United League Supercup
- (European Union) ABA League Supercup

=== Tennis (except Croatia and Slovenia) ===
- (United Nations) Wimbledon
- (United Nations) ATP Finals
- (United Nations) ATP Masters 1000
- (United Nations) ATP 500
- (United Nations) ATP 250
- (United Nations) WTA Tour
- (United Nations) Davis Cup
- (United Nations) United Cup

=== Motorsports ===
- (United Nations) Formula One (except Croatia and Slovenia)
- (United Nations) Formula Two (except Croatia and Slovenia)
- (United Nations) Formula Three (except Croatia and Slovenia)
- (United Nations) MotoGP (except Croatia and Slovenia)
- (United Nations) Moto2 (except Croatia and Slovenia)
- (United Nations) Moto3 (except Croatia and Slovenia)
- (United Nations) WRC
- (United States) NASCAR

=== Handball ===
==== International competitions ====
- (European Union) EHF Champions League
- (European Union) EHF Women's Champions League
- (European Union) EHF European League
- (European Union) EHF European Cup
- (European Union) IHF Men's Super Globe

==== Leagues ====
- (Germany) Bundesliga
- (Hungary) Nemzeti Bajnokság I
- (Poland) Polish Superliga
- (Slovenia) Slovenian First League
- (Serbia) Serbian Super League
- (Serbia) Serbian Women's Super League
- (European Union) SEHA League

==== Cups ====
- (Germany) DHB-Pokal
- (Hungary) Magyar Kupa
- (Poland) Polish Cup
- (Slovenia) Slovenian Cup
- (Serbia) Serbian Cup
- (Germany) DHB-Supercup
- (Slovenia) Slovenian Supercup

=== Volleyball ===
==== International competitions ====
- (United Nations) Men's Nations League
- (United Nations) Women's Nations League
- (European Union) CEV Champions League
- (European Union) CEV Women's Champions League
- (European Union) CEV Cup
- (European Union) Women's CEV Cup
- (European Union) CEV Challenge Cup
- (European Union) CEV Women's Challenge Cup

==== Leagues ====
- (Italy) Italian Men's League
- (Italy) Italian Women's League
- (Poland) Polish Men's League
- (Poland) Polish Women's League
- (Germany) German Men's League
- (Germany) German Women's League
- (Slovenia) Slovenian Men's League
- (Slovenia) Slovenian Women's League
- Serbia Men's League
- Serbia Women's League

=== Athletics ===
- (United Nations) Diamond League

=== American football ===
- (United States) NFL
- (United States) College football

=== Baseball ===
- (United States) (Canada) MLB

=== Ice hockey ===
- (United States) (Canada) NHL
- (Russia) (Belarus) KHL
- (European Union) Champions League

=== Mixed martial arts ===
- (United Nations) UFC

=== Water polo ===
- (European Union) LEN Champions League
- (European Union) LEN Euro Cup
- (Serbia) (Croatia) (Montenegro) (Slovenia) Regional League

=== Rugby ===
- (United Nations) The Rugby Championship
- (United Nations) United Rugby Championship
- (European Union) Champions Cup
- (European Union) EPCR Challenge Cup
- (European Union) Six Nations Championship
