= List of current ABA League Second Division team rosters =

Below is a list of current rosters of teams from ABA League Second Division.

There are a total of 14 teams in the Second Division for the 2020–21 season.

== Borac Banja Luka ==
Note: Flags indicate national team eligibility at FIBA-sanctioned events. Players may hold other non-FIBA nationalities not displayed.

Borac Banja Luka roster
Players
Coaches

Pos.	No.	Nat.	Name	Ht.	Age
SG	0	(Bosnia and Herzegovina)	Gavrić, Srđan	1.96 m (6 ft 5 in)	29 – 12 May 1995
PF	1	(United States)	Cunningham, Joshua	2.05 m (6 ft 9 in)	28 – 11 August 1996
SG	4	(Bosnia and Herzegovina)	Dragojević, Boris	1.94 m (6 ft 4 in)	23 – 1 March 2002
PG	7	(Bosnia and Herzegovina)	Knežević, Draško	1.85 m (6 ft 1 in)	32 – 3 February 1993
F	10	(Bosnia and Herzegovina)	Sikiraš, Njegoš	2.06 m (6 ft 9 in)	25 – 11 April 1999
C	15	(Serbia)	Šešlija, Radoš	2.08 m (6 ft 10 in)	33 – 4 February 1992
F	34	(Bosnia and Herzegovina)	Bošković, Vuk	2.00 m (6 ft 7 in)	21 – 21 July 2003
G/F	36	(Bosnia and Herzegovina)	Janković, Aljoša	2.02 m (6 ft 8 in)	26 – 8 February 1999
C	55	(Bosnia and Herzegovina)	Reljić, Nemanja	2.08 m (6 ft 10 in)	24 – 25 June 2000
C	-	(Croatia)	Buljević, Lovro	2.10 m (6 ft 11 in)	26 – 12 August 1998
SF	-	(Bosnia and Herzegovina)	Delalić, Amsal (L)	2.02 m (6 ft 8 in)	21 – 24 July 2003
SG	-	(Slovenia)	Rebec, Jan	1.92 m (6 ft 4 in)	32 – 17 February 1993
SF	-	(Bosnia and Herzegovina)	Lakić, Stefan	2.03 m (6 ft 8 in)	30 – 12 January 1995
PF	-	(Serbia)	Langović, Aleksandar	2.03 m (6 ft 8 in)	24 – 19 February 2001
C	–	(Serbia)	Tanasković, Dušan	2.08 m (6 ft 10 in)	24 – 23 February 2001

Head coach

- (Montenegro) Zoran Kašćelan

Assistant coach(es)

- (Bosnia and Herzegovina) Nemanja Tomić

Legend

- (C) Team captain
- Injured

- Roster
Updated: August 10, 2022

== Gorica ==
Note: Flags indicate national team eligibility at FIBA-sanctioned events. Players may hold other non-FIBA nationalities not displayed.

Gorica roster
Players
Coaches

Pos.	No.	Nat.	Name	Ht.	Age
SF	8	(Bosnia and Herzegovina)	Mašić, Ante	2.00 m (6 ft 7 in)	39 – 28 October 1985
SG	9	(Croatia)	Savić, Emil	2.00 m (6 ft 7 in)	26 – 26 March 1998
F	11	(Croatia)	Batur, Ivan	2.03 m (6 ft 8 in)	33 – 4 July 1991
G	15	(Croatia)	Uljarević, Karlo	1.88 m (6 ft 2 in)	26 – 20 November 1998
PF	24	(Croatia)	Baković, Marko	2.05 m (6 ft 9 in)	32 – 22 February 1993
SG	–	(Croatia)	Majić, Ivan Tvrtko	1.94 m (6 ft 4 in)	27 – 29 January 1998
SF	–	(Croatia)	Cvitković, Tomislav	2.06 m (6 ft 9 in)	26 – 19 May 1998

Head coach

- (Croatia) Vladimir Krstić

Legend

- (C) Team captain
- Injured

- Roster
Updated: August 6, 2022

== Helios Suns ==
Note: Flags indicate national team eligibility at FIBA-sanctioned events. Players may hold other non-FIBA nationalities not displayed.

Kansai Helios Domžale roster
Players
Coaches

Pos.	No.	Nat.	Name	Ht.	Age
PG	3	(Finland)	Blomgren, Perttu	1.95 m (6 ft 5 in)	23 – 13 September 2001
SG	5	(Slovenia)	Babič, Jan	1.90 m (6 ft 3 in)	20 – 26 March 2004
SG	6	(Slovenia)	Zemljič, Jan	1.92 m (6 ft 4 in)	20 – 14 October 2004
F	7	(Slovenia)	Mirtič, Tibor	2.02 m (6 ft 8 in)	22 – 5 February 2003
SG	8	(Slovenia)	Nemanič, Rok	1.92 m (6 ft 4 in)	23 – 28 December 2001
PG	9	(Slovenia)	Barič, Nejc	1.83 m (6 ft 0 in)	27 – 23 April 1997
SF	10	(Slovenia)	Brkič Štebe, Jan	1.98 m (6 ft 6 in)	19 – 31 May 2005
SF	11	(Slovenia)	Copot, Jan	1.99 m (6 ft 6 in)	23 – 9 October 2001
PF	15	(United States)	West, Lamont	2.03 m (6 ft 8 in)	27 – 2 June 1997
C	17	(Bosnia and Herzegovina)	Glišić, Miloš	2.07 m (6 ft 9 in)	26 – 21 April 1998
F	21	(Slovenia)	Mahkovic, Blaž (C)	2.01 m (6 ft 7 in)	35 – 21 March 1990
PF	31	(Slovenia)	Sirc, Lenart	2.04 m (6 ft 8 in)	21 – 17 December 2003
C	33	(Slovenia)	Pahernik, Teo	2.05 m (6 ft 9 in)	19 – 29 October 2005
C	41	(Slovenia)	Daneu, Žiga	2.11 m (6 ft 11 in)	22 – 10 August 2002

Head coach

- (Slovenia) Damjan Novaković

Assistant coach(es)

- (Slovenia) Andrej Podvršnik

Strength & conditioning coach(es)

- (Slovenia) Gašper Šoln

Physiotherapist(s)

- (Slovenia) Tim Drenovec

Legend

- (C) Team captain
- Injured

- Roster
Updated: 25 September 2023

== Krka ==
Note: Flags indicate national team eligibility at FIBA-sanctioned events. Players may hold other non-FIBA nationalities not displayed.

KK Krka roster
Players
Coaches

Pos.	No.	Nat.	Name	Ht.	Age
F	0	(United States)	Robinson, Kendall	1.98 m (6 ft 6 in)	25 – 21 September 1999
PG	2	(Slovenia)	Krošelj, Jazon	1.85 m (6 ft 1 in)	16 – 20 September 2008
F	3	(Slovenia)	Mirtič, Tibor	2.02 m (6 ft 8 in)	22 – 5 February 2003
G	7	(Slovenia)	Bačvić, Niko	1.91 m (6 ft 3 in)	27 – 23 September 1997
SG	8	(Slovenia)	Fila, Lovro	1.95 m (6 ft 5 in)	18 – 28 October 2006
G	11	(United States)	Persons, Tayler	1.91 m (6 ft 3 in)	29 – 31 August 1995
C	12	(Slovenia)	Plut, Bine	2.03 m (6 ft 8 in)	18 – 8 July 2006
F	13	(Slovenia)	Jurković, Robert	2.08 m (6 ft 10 in)	22 – 14 June 2002
G	17	(Slovenia)	Špan, Jan (C)	1.89 m (6 ft 2 in)	32 – 20 November 1992
SG	20	(Slovenia)	Cerkvenik, Miha	2.01 m (6 ft 7 in)	23 – 9 November 2001
PF	21	(Serbia)	Bursać, Aleksandar	2.05 m (6 ft 9 in)	30 – 19 March 1995
C	22	(United States)	Skeens, Brady	2.02 m (6 ft 8 in)	29 – 8 August 1995
G	24	(Slovenia)	Smrekar, Žak	1.96 m (6 ft 5 in)	18 – 10 August 2006
G	47	(Slovenia)	Klobučar, Jaka	2.02 m (6 ft 8 in)	21 – 27 March 2003
F	55	(Slovenia)	Čebašek, Jakob	2.00 m (6 ft 7 in)	33 – 28 April 1991

Head coach

- (Slovenia) Dejan Jakara

Assistant coach(es)

- (Slovenia) Domen Zevnik
- (Croatia) Leon Stipaničev

Strength & conditioning coach(es)

- (Slovenia) Janez Konjar
- (Slovenia) Jernej Pejanović

Physiotherapist(s)

- (Slovenia) Davorin Matkovič

Legend

- (C) Team captain
- Injured

- Roster
Updated: 12 February 2025

== Pelister ==
Note: Flags indicate national team eligibility at FIBA-sanctioned events. Players may hold other non-FIBA nationalities not displayed.

KK Pelister roster
Players
Coaches

Pos.	No.	Nat.	Name	Ht.		Age
SG	1	(United States)	Antoine, Bryan	1.96 m (6 ft 5 in)	84 kg (185 lb)	24 – 26 April 2000
PG	3	(North Macedonia)	Stojanovski, Luka	1.90 m (6 ft 3 in)	85 kg (187 lb)	25 – 4 February 2000
PG	4	(North Macedonia)	Stajić, Boban	1.85 m (6 ft 1 in)		31 – 6 October 1993
PG	7	(North Macedonia)	Kostoski, Aleksandar	1.88 m (6 ft 2 in)		37 – 5 March 1988
SF	8	(North Macedonia)	Krstevski, Damjan	1.97 m (6 ft 6 in)		25 – 30 June 1999
PG	10	(North Macedonia)	Najdovski, Darko	1.75 m (5 ft 9 in)		30 – 15 April 1994
PF	15	(Serbia)	Mišković, Nikola	2.09 m (6 ft 10 in)	101 kg (223 lb)	26 – 25 January 1999
PF	16	(United States)	Galloway, Jonathan	2.08 m (6 ft 10 in)	107 kg (236 lb)	28 – 19 June 1996
G	32	(United States)	Gambrell, Jeremiah	1.90 m (6 ft 3 in)	86 kg (190 lb)
PF	33	(North Macedonia)	Pandev, Dimitar	2.08 m (6 ft 10 in)	102 kg (225 lb)	27 – 9 October 1997

Head coach

- (Serbia) Nenad Trajković

Assistant coach(es)

- (North Macedonia) Dean Ilievski
- (North Macedonia) Damjan Veljanov

Legend

- (C) Team captain
- Injured

- Roster
Updated: October 29, 2024

== Podgorica ==
Note: Flags indicate national team eligibility at FIBA-sanctioned events. Players may hold other non-FIBA nationalities not displayed.

Podgorica roster
Players
Coaches

Pos.	No.	Nat.	Name	Ht.	Age
PG	0	(France)	Beyhurst, Ludovic	1.72 m (5 ft 8 in)	26 – 5 January 1999
SG	1	(United States)	Gohlke, Jack	1.89 m (6 ft 2 in)	25 – 3 December 1999
C	3	(Serbia)	Vujić, Mladen	2.05 m (6 ft 9 in)	26 – 14 August 1998
G	4	(Montenegro)	Vojinović, Jovan	1.93 m (6 ft 4 in)	26 – 10 November 1998
F/C	5	(Montenegro)	Anđušić, Filip	2.08 m (6 ft 10 in)	23 – 22 January 2002
SF	7	(Montenegro)	Kljajević, Marko	2.02 m (6 ft 8 in)	23 – 4 May 2001
SG	8	(Montenegro)	Radunović, Marko	2.00 m (6 ft 7 in)	18 – 11 April 2006
G	9	(Montenegro)	Čarapić, Ognjen	1.95 m (6 ft 5 in)	26 – 1 September 1998
SF	10	(Montenegro)	Vujisić, Viktor	2.01 m (6 ft 7 in)	24 – 6 March 2001
SF	13	(Montenegro)	Brnović, Danilo	2.00 m (6 ft 7 in)	24 – 10 August 2000
SF	16	(Montenegro)	Kaluđerović, Vladan	1.98 m (6 ft 6 in)	27 – 4 March 1998
PG	17	(Switzerland)	Fofana, Selim	1.93 m (6 ft 4 in)	25 – 8 July 1999
PF	22	(Montenegro)	Vukčević, Lazar	2.03 m (6 ft 8 in)	22 – 12 March 2003
PF	35	(Montenegro)	Lacmanović, Danilo	2.05 m (6 ft 9 in)	21 – 18 February 2004
PF	44	(Croatia)	Barišić, Luka	2.08 m (6 ft 10 in)	27 – 3 January 1998
PG	77	(Montenegro)	Hot, Amar	1.83 m (6 ft 0 in)	20 – 19 July 2004
G	–	(Montenegro)	Bogavac, Luka	1.95 m (6 ft 5 in)	21 – 20 September 2003

Head coach

- (Montenegro) Nebojša Bogavac

Assistant coach(es)

- (Montenegro) Vladimir Vuković
- (Serbia) Branko Milisavljević
- (Montenegro) Dragan Radović
- (Montenegro) Nikola Bulatović

Legend

- (C) Team captain
- Injured

- Roster
Updated: December 9, 2022

== Sloga ==
Note: Flags indicate national team eligibility at FIBA-sanctioned events. Players may hold other non-FIBA nationalities not displayed.

Sloga roster
Players
Coaches

Pos.	No.	Nat.	Name	Ht.	Age
SF	7	(Serbia)	Matović, Stefan	2.03 m (6 ft 8 in)	34 – 3 March 1991
G/F	25	(Serbia)	Simeunović, Đorđe	2.02 m (6 ft 8 in)	22 – 4 September 2002
F	44	(Serbia)	Stamenić, Jovan	1.97 m (6 ft 6 in)	28 – 13 May 1996
G		(Bosnia and Herzegovina)	Nikolić, Nemanja	1.96 m (6 ft 5 in)	26 – 7 October 1998
PG		(Lebanon)	Khalil, Jad	1.86 m (6 ft 1 in)	28 – 20 November 1996
G/F		(United States)	Underwood, Dimitrius	1.93 m (6 ft 4 in)
SG		(Serbia)	Paunović, Zoran	1.99 m (6 ft 6 in)	24 – 19 July 2000
PG		(Bosnia and Herzegovina)	Bojanić, Andrej	1.92 m (6 ft 4 in)	22 – 11 July 2002
PF		(Bosnia and Herzegovina)	Đurović, Lazar	2.02 m (6 ft 8 in)	27 – 18 October 1997

Head coach

- (Serbia) Marko Dimitrijević

Legend

- (C) Team captain
- (TW) Two-way affiliate player
- Injured

- Roster
Updated: September 19, 2022

== Spars Ilidža ==
Note: Flags indicate national team eligibility at FIBA-sanctioned events. Players may hold other non-FIBA nationalities not displayed.

Spars Ilidža roster
Players
Coaches

Pos.	No.	Nat.	Name	Ht.	Age
SF	3	(United States)	Burch-Manning, Trey	1.98 m (6 ft 6 in)	29 – 21 September 1995
PF	4	(Slovenia)	Durnik, Urban	2.04 m (6 ft 8 in)	27 – 19 June 1997
SG	5	(Serbia)	Vraneš, Miloš	2.01 m (6 ft 7 in)	29 – 25 April 1995
G	7	(Croatia)	Mustapić, Jakov	1.93 m (6 ft 4 in)	30 – 22 August 1994
SG	8	(Bosnia and Herzegovina)	Hasandić, Almir	1.90 m (6 ft 3 in)	34 – 19 October 1990
PG	9	(Montenegro)	Vrbica, Mašan	1.87 m (6 ft 2 in)	30 – 14 June 1994
G	10	(United States)	Abell, Remy	1.93 m (6 ft 4 in)	32 – 17 August 1992
C	11	(Bosnia and Herzegovina)	Polutak, Imran	2.09 m (6 ft 10 in)	28 – 9 July 1996
C	13	(Bosnia and Herzegovina)	Livadić, Reuf	2.13 m (7 ft 0 in)	24 – 20 June 2000
F	14	(Bosnia and Herzegovina)	Buza, Nedim	2.05 m (6 ft 9 in)	24 – 10 May 2000
G	20	(Croatia)	Butorac, Dino	1.92 m (6 ft 4 in)	34 – 8 October 1990
PG	28	(Bosnia and Herzegovina)	Gatarić, Aleksa	1.86 m (6 ft 1 in)	22 – 19 April 2002

Head coach

- (Montenegro) Miodrag Kadija

Assistant coach(es)

- (Bosnia and Herzegovina) Srđan Stanić

Legend

- (C) Team captain
- Injured

- Roster
Updated: July 10, 2022

== Sutjeska ==
Note: Flags indicate national team eligibility at FIBA-sanctioned events. Players may hold other non-FIBA nationalities not displayed.

KK Sutjeska roster
Players
Coaches

Pos.	No.	Nat.	Name	Ht.	Age
PG	1	(Bosnia and Herzegovina)	Zahiragić, Adi	1.87 m (6 ft 2 in)	30 – 24 February 1995
PG	4	(Bosnia and Herzegovina)	Milović, Vasilije	1.88 m (6 ft 2 in)	23 – 11 May 2001
G	5	(Montenegro)	Varajić, Ilija	1.96 m (6 ft 5 in)	22 – 18 June 2002
C	9	(Serbia)	Koprivica, Miloš	2.08 m (6 ft 10 in)	30 – 24 March 1995
SF	10	(Montenegro)	Ćalić, Marko	1.96 m (6 ft 5 in)	39 – 28 February 1986
C	11	(Montenegro)	Vujović, Miloš	2.06 m (6 ft 9 in)	29 – 16 January 1996
SF	12	(Montenegro)	Bojić, Bogdan	2.01 m (6 ft 7 in)	26 – 3 March 1999
SG	13	(Montenegro)	Vuković, Radoš	1.98 m (6 ft 6 in)	23 – 7 February 2002
PF	14	(Montenegro)	Spasojević, Radosav	2.04 m (6 ft 8 in)	33 – 28 February 1992
SF	15	(Montenegro)	Tomašević, Vladimir	2.01 m (6 ft 7 in)	34 – 13 January 1991
C	17	(Montenegro)	Vujošević, Radoje	2.08 m (6 ft 10 in)	35 – 5 May 1989
G/F	23	(Montenegro)	Gutović, Ognjen	2.00 m (6 ft 7 in)	23 – 23 November 2001

Head coach

- (Montenegro) Darko Vujačić

Legend

- (C) Team captain
- Injured

- Roster
Updated: March 22, 2022

== GDD Šenčur ==
Note: Flags indicate national team eligibility at FIBA-sanctioned events. Players may hold other non-FIBA nationalities not displayed.

GGD Šenčur roster
Players
Coaches

Pos.	No.	Nat.	Name	Ht.	Age
G	0	(Slovenia)	Čibej, Matej	1.86 m (6 ft 1 in)	22 – 29 May 2002
G	1	(Serbia)	Vidić, Milutin	1.88 m (6 ft 2 in)	21 – 8 January 2004
G	2	(Slovenia)	Novak, Jan	1.94 m (6 ft 4 in)	29 – 7 July 1995
F	3	(Slovenia)	Ožegovič, Gaber	1.98 m (6 ft 6 in)	27 – 7 February 1998
SG	5	(Slovenia)	Kmetič, Primož	1.96 m (6 ft 5 in)	24 – 5 January 2001
C	6	(Slovenia)	Bajazet, Vito	2.06 m (6 ft 9 in)	20 – 14 November 2004
PF	7	(Slovenia)	Murić, Dino	2.02 m (6 ft 8 in)	35 – 14 February 1990
SG	9	(Slovenia)	Zulić, Alen	1.94 m (6 ft 4 in)	20 – 21 June 2004
C	10	(Croatia)	Antić, Frane	2.08 m (6 ft 10 in)	22 – 20 January 2003
SG	11	(Slovenia)	Martinčič, Nejc	1.89 m (6 ft 2 in)	27 – 4 April 1997
PF	13	(Serbia)	Đapa, Dalibor	2.05 m (6 ft 9 in)	40 – 23 October 1984
PF	14	(Serbia)	Dragović, Balša	2.08 m (6 ft 10 in)	28 – 26 August 1996
F	16	(Slovenia)	Malovčič, Alen	2.02 m (6 ft 8 in)	22 – 16 August 2002
PF	19	(Slovenia)	Petrovič, Domen	2.06 m (6 ft 9 in)	20 – 19 April 2004
G	20	(Slovenia)	Bolhar, Lovro	1.94 m (6 ft 4 in)	19 – 10 March 2006
F	21	(Slovenia)	Rudović, Luka	2.05 m (6 ft 9 in)	22 – 21 February 2003

Head coach

- (Serbia) Miljan Pavković

Assistant coach(es)

- (Slovenia) Luka Mijović

Physiotherapist(s)

- (Slovenia) Luka Levec

Legend

- (C) Team captain
- Injured

- Roster
Updated: 24 December 2023

== Široki ==
Note: Flags indicate national team eligibility at FIBA-sanctioned events. Players may hold other non-FIBA nationalities not displayed.

HKK Široki roster
Players
Coaches

Pos.	No.	Nat.	Name	Ht.	Age
F	6	(Croatia)	Ivanov, Ive	2.00 m (6 ft 7 in)	39 – 13 November 1985
SG	8	(Croatia)	Kučan, Ivan	1.95 m (6 ft 5 in)	28 – 2 May 1996
PF	10	(Croatia)	Vucić, Mate	2.03 m (6 ft 8 in)	27 – 11 November 1997
PF	12	(Croatia)	Čolak, Mateo	2.06 m (6 ft 9 in)	26 – 24 April 1998
F	13	(Croatia)	Miletić, Nikola	1.97 m (6 ft 6 in)	20 – 28 June 2004
G	14	(United States)	Caruthers, Dontay	1.93 m (6 ft 4 in)	29 – 23 June 1995
SF	15	(Croatia)	Galić, Ivan	1.97 m (6 ft 6 in)	20 – 4 July 2004
SG	20	(Croatia)	Jelčić, Stanko	1.90 m (6 ft 3 in)	21 – 18 March 2004
C	21	(Bosnia and Herzegovina)	Čović, Mile	2.05 m (6 ft 9 in)	26 – 18 June 1998
SG	23	(Croatia)	Ćavar, Ivo	1.88 m (6 ft 2 in)	26 – 26 June 1998
F	24	(Croatia)	Zubac, Pero	2.01 m (6 ft 7 in)	20 – 7 February 2005
C	33	(Bosnia and Herzegovina)	Damjanović, Marko	2.13 m (7 ft 0 in)	26 – 30 November 1998
G	44	(Croatia)	Vujanović, Dominik	1.82 m (6 ft 0 in)	21 – 4 August 2003

Head coach

- (Bosnia and Herzegovina) Ivan Velić

Assistant coach(es)

- (Bosnia and Herzegovina) Ante Lončar

Strength & conditioning coach(es)

- (Bosnia and Herzegovina) Mile Galić

Physiotherapist(s)

- (Bosnia and Herzegovina) Tomislav Sesar

Legend

- (C) Team captain
- Injured

- Roster
Updated: February 25, 2022

== TFT Skopje ==
Note: Flags indicate national team eligibility at FIBA-sanctioned events. Players may hold other non-FIBA nationalities not displayed.

KK TFT roster
Players
Coaches

Pos.	No.	Nat.	Name	Ht.	Age
PG	0	(North Macedonia)	Tašovski, Viktor	1.85 m (6 ft 1 in)	23 – 22 November 2001
SG	1	(United States)	Brown, Zach	1.98 m (6 ft 6 in)	29 – 28 September 1995
SG	2	(North Macedonia)	Nikolovski, Marko	1.88 m (6 ft 2 in)	21 – 29 June 2003
PG	4	(United States)	Greenlee, BJ	1.83 m (6 ft 0 in)	24 – 7 June 2000
SF	6	(North Macedonia)	Stojanoski, Toma	1.98 m (6 ft 6 in)	20 – 14 June 2004
SG	7	(North Macedonia)	Vasilevski, Nikola	1.92 m (6 ft 4 in)	21 – 3 August 2003
PF	8	(Russia)	Kotov, Alex	2.03 m (6 ft 8 in)	25 – 18 May 1999
PF	9	(North Macedonia)	Nikolov, Strahil	2.00 m (6 ft 7 in)	24 – 17 July 2000
PF	13	(North Macedonia)	Nuri, Edis	2.00 m (6 ft 7 in)	42 – 13 August 1982
SG	17	(North Macedonia)	Sapundjiev, Ivan	1.97 m (6 ft 6 in)	30 – 13 May 1994
PG	30	(North Macedonia)	Stojanov, Mihail	1.85 m (6 ft 1 in)	20 – 19 November 2004
PG	40	(United States)	Govens, Darrin	1.85 m (6 ft 1 in)	37 – 5 January 1988
PF	41	(United States)	Haugton, David	1.99 m (6 ft 6 in)	33 – 1 August 1991
SF	77	(North Macedonia)	Zafirov, Georgi	1.96 m (6 ft 5 in)	27 – 7 May 1997

Head coach

- (North Macedonia) Boro Smilkovski

Assistant coach(es)

- (North Macedonia) Nino Čaćić
- (North Macedonia) Marjan Ugrinovski

Physiotherapist(s)

- (North Macedonia) Dimitar Shavkulovski

Legend

- (C) Team captain
- Injured

- Roster
Updated: 12 October 2024

== Vrijednosnice Osijek ==
Note: Flags indicate national team eligibility at FIBA-sanctioned events. Players may hold other non-FIBA nationalities not displayed.

KK Vrijednosnice Osijek roster
Players
Coaches

Pos.	No.	Nat.	Name	Ht.	Age
PG	1	(South Sudan)	Makoi, Anyiarbany	1.93 m (6 ft 4 in)	24 – 3 July 2000
G	4	(Croatia)	Lisica, Šime Lovre	1.90 m (6 ft 3 in)	26 – 25 August 1998
PG	5	(Croatia)	Flanjak, Gabrijel	1.89 m (6 ft 2 in)	19 – 26 March 2005
PG	6	(Croatia)	Filipović, Franco	1.86 m (6 ft 1 in)	23 – 7 April 2001
SF	8	(Croatia)	Tomljenović, Tadej	1.92 m (6 ft 4 in)	23 – 13 February 2002
PF	9	(Croatia)	Tokić, Matej	2.04 m (6 ft 8 in)	22 – 24 November 2002
SG	10	(Croatia)	Špehar, Luka	1.95 m (6 ft 5 in)	24 – 9 February 2001
G/F	11	(Croatia)	Porobić, Vito	1.98 m (6 ft 6 in)	23 – 24 April 2001
SF	12	(South Sudan)	Kuany, Kuany	2.00 m (6 ft 7 in)	30 – 8 July 1994
SF	13	(Bosnia and Herzegovina)	Bošnjak, Marko	1.98 m (6 ft 6 in)	25 – 12 February 2000
C	14	(Bosnia and Herzegovina)	Simanić, Stefan	2.07 m (6 ft 9 in)	23 – 2 August 2001
C	15	(Bosnia and Herzegovina)	Topolović, Đorđe	2.08 m (6 ft 10 in)	23 – 7 July 2001
G	19	(Croatia)	Jurić, Marin	1.92 m (6 ft 4 in)	22 – 26 February 2003

Head coach

- (Croatia) Marko Mandić

Assistant coach(es)

- (Croatia) Nedjeljko Matić

Legend

- (C) Team captain
- Injured

- Roster
Updated: December 31, 2021

== Zlatibor ==
Note: Flags indicate national team eligibility at FIBA-sanctioned events. Players may hold other non-FIBA nationalities not displayed.

KK Zlatibor roster
Players
Coaches

Pos.	No.	Nat.	Name	Ht.	Age
PF	44	(Serbia)	Curcic, Vasilije	2.06 m (6 ft 9 in)	33 – 11 October 1991
PG	3	(Serbia)	Protić, Nemanja	1.82 m (6 ft 0 in)	38 – 13 August 1986
PF	4	(Serbia)	Čabrilo, Aleksa	2.06 m (6 ft 9 in)	27 – 16 November 1997
SF	7	(Serbia)	Đuran, Filip	1.98 m (6 ft 6 in)	33 – 4 July 1991
SG	9	(Slovenia)	Grubelič, Sandi	1.96 m (6 ft 5 in)	30 – 3 October 1994
SG	10	(Serbia)	Đukanović, Brano	1.96 m (6 ft 5 in)	30 – 21 March 1995
C	11	(Serbia)	Milošević, Lazar	2.05 m (6 ft 9 in)	20 – 8 April 2004
F	13	(Serbia)	Matović, Andrija	1.98 m (6 ft 6 in)	21 – 25 September 2003
SF	21	(Serbia)	Joksimović, Lazar	2.03 m (6 ft 8 in)	23 – 6 January 2002
PG	22	(Serbia)	Tadić, Tadija	1.94 m (6 ft 4 in)	25 – 22 April 1999
SG	24	(Serbia)	Ponjavić, Aleksandar	2.00 m (6 ft 7 in)	34 – 3 March 1991
SG	33	(Serbia)	Čorbić, Boško	1.91 m (6 ft 3 in)	29 – 9 August 1995
F/C	35	(Serbia)	Tejić, Marko	2.10 m (6 ft 11 in)	29 – 4 August 1995
PG	44	(Serbia)	Tejić, Bogdan	1.90 m (6 ft 3 in)	24 – 18 January 2001

Head coach

- (Serbia) Strajin Nedović

Legend

- (C) Team captain
- Injured

- Roster
Updated: December 9, 2022

== See also ==
- List of current ABA League First Division team rosters
- List of current Basketball League of Serbia team rosters
