= 2021 ABA League Second Division Playoffs =

Basketball league play-offs

Tournament details
- City: Podgorica
- Dates: 19 April – 6 May 2021
- Season: 2020–21
- Teams: 8
- Defending champions: Koper Primorska

Final positions
- Champions: Studentski centar (1st title)
- Runners-up: Spars
- Semifinalists: Podgorica; Mladost MaxBet

The 2021 ABA League Second Division Playoffs is the play-off tournament that decides the winner of the 2020–21 ABA League Second Division season. The winner of the play-offs qualifies for the 2021–22 ABA League First Division.

== Playoffs format ==
Based on the results and position of the clubs in the standings after the regular season, Playoffs will take place with teams from 1st to 8th position. The Quarterfinals will be played in knockout pairs 1–8, 2–7, 3–6, 4–5. The winners of the Quarterfinals will qualify to the Semifinals and the winners of the Semifinals will play the Final.

== Qualified teams ==
Round	Team	Ref.
9	(Montenegro) Studentski centar	
11	(Bosnia and Herzegovina) Spars	
11	(Bosnia and Herzegovina) Borac Banja Luka	
12	(Serbia) Mladost MaxBet	
12	(North Macedonia) MZT Skopje Aerodrom	
12	(Serbia) Zlatibor	
12	(Montenegro) Podgorica	
12	(Serbia) Sloboda Užice	

== Venue ==
On 3 April 2021, it was announced that the Playoffs will be played in Podgorica, Montenegro.

Podgorica	2021 ABA League Second Division Playoffs (Yugoslavia)
Morača Sports Center	2021 ABA League Second Division Playoffs (Yugoslavia)
Capacity: 6,000	2021 ABA League Second Division Playoffs (Yugoslavia)

== Bracket ==
Quarterfinals
19–21 April
3 (Bosnia and Herzegovina) Borac Banja Luka	90	65	155
6 (Montenegro) Podgorica	86	77	163
19–21 April
2 (Bosnia and Herzegovina) Spars	79	82	161
7 (Serbia) Zlatibor	82	74	156
20–22 April
4 (Serbia) Mladost MaxBet	95	86	181
5 (North Macedonia) MZT Skopje Aerodrom	75	92	167
20–22 April
1 (Montenegro) Studentski centar	96	90	186
8 (Serbia) Sloboda Užice	92	80	172

Semifinals
23–25 April
6 (Montenegro) Podgorica	64	59	123
2 (Bosnia and Herzegovina) Spars	72	74	146
24–26 April
4 (Serbia) Mladost MaxBet	85	66	151
1 (Montenegro) Studentski centar	86	76	162

Finals
4–6 May
2 (Bosnia and Herzegovina) Spars	89	72	161
1 (Montenegro) Studentski centar	99	71	170

== Quarterfinals ==
All times are local UTC+1.

=== Borac Banja Luka v Podgorica ===
19 April 2021 Game 1	Borac Banja Luka (Bosnia and Herzegovina)	90–86	(Montenegro) Podgorica	Podgorica
12:00	Scoring by quarter: 20–19, 27–23, 13–25, 30–19
	Pts: Simeunović 20; Rebs: Tanasković 9 Asts: Simeunović 6 PIR: Simeunović 27	Boxscore	Pts: Koprivica 19; Rebs: Tomašević 9 Asts: Čarapić 11; PIR: Koprivica 29	Arena: Morača Sports Center; Attendance: 10; Referees: Radoš Arsenijević, Ivan Stefanović, Stefan Ćalić

21 April 2021 Game 2	Podgorica (Montenegro)	77–65	(Bosnia and Herzegovina) Borac Banja Luka	Podgorica
12:00	Scoring by quarter: 18–17, 19–18, 15–13, 25–17
	Pts: Musić 25; Rebs: Musić 9 Asts: Musić 6 PIR: Musić 38	Boxscore	Pts: Tanasković 22; Rebs: Simeunović 9 Asts: Knežević 5 PIR: Tanasković 17	Arena: Morača Sports Center; Attendance: 10; Referees: Igor Dragojević, Radoš Arsenijević, Nermin Nikšić

=== Spars v Zlatibor ===
19 April 2021 Game 1	Spars (Bosnia and Herzegovina)	79–82	(Serbia) Zlatibor	Podgorica
16:00	Scoring by quarter: 23–22, 21–27, 12–21, 23–12
	Pts: Kamenjaš 21; Rebs: Kamenjaš 9 Asts: Zahiragić 8 PIR: Zahiragić 27	Boxscore	Pts: Papić 17; Rebs: three players 7 Asts: Protić 9 PIR: Papić 23	Arena: Morača Sports Center; Attendance: 10; Referees: Igor Dragojević, Krunoslav Peić, Branimir Galić

21 April 2021 Game 2	Zlatibor (Serbia)	74–82	(Bosnia and Herzegovina) Spars	Podgorica
16:00	Scoring by quarter: 21–14, 22–26, 20–24, 11–18
	Pts: Protić 22; Rebs: McCoy 14; Asts: Kutlešić 6 PIR: McCoy 29	Boxscore	Pts: Kamenjaš 19; Rebs: Kamenjaš 12; Asts: Zahiragić 10; PIR: Kamenjaš 31	Arena: Morača Sports Center; Attendance: 10; Referees: Miloš Koljenšić, Vladimir Marić, Stefan Vuković

=== Mladost MaxBet v MZT Skopje Aerodrom ===
20 April 2021 Game 1	Mladost MaxBet (Serbia)	95–75	(North Macedonia) MZT Skopje Aerodrom	Podgorica
12:00	Scoring by quarter: 28–19, 24–20, 18–19, 25–17
	Pts: Drechsel 24; Rebs: Tanasković 12; Asts: Drechsel 7 PIR: Drechsel, Tanasković 31	Boxscore	Pts: Karačić 15; Rebs: Karačić 6 Asts: Turner 8 PIR: Turner 15	Arena: Morača Sports Center; Referees: Miloš Koljenšić, Tomislav Stapić, Stefan Vuković

22 April 2021 Game 2	MZT Skopje Aerodrom (North Macedonia)	92–86	(Serbia) Mladost MaxBet	Podgorica
12:00	Scoring by quarter: 20–31, 26–12, 23–24, 23–19
	Pts: Gravett, Karačić 21; Rebs: Karačić 9 Asts: Mekić 5 PIR: Karačić 35	Boxscore	Pts: Gombauld 14; Rebs: Gombauld 7 Asts: Drechsel 4 PIR: Gombauld 14	Arena: Morača Sports Center; Referees: Ivan Stefanović, Branimir Galić, Stefan Ćalić

=== Studentski centar v Sloboda Užice ===
20 April 2021 Game 1	Studentski centar (Montenegro)	96–92	(Serbia) Sloboda Užice	Podgorica
16:00	Scoring by quarter: 17–18, 27–32, 23–24, 29–18
	Pts: Drobnjak 24; Rebs: Drobnjak 7 Asts: Pavličević 6 PIR: Drobnjak 29	Boxscore	Pts: Tadić 18; Rebs: Tadić 6 Asts: Ilkić, Ilić 4 PIR: Tadić 25	Arena: Morača Sports Center; Referees: Luka Kardum, Nermin Nikšić, Vladimir Marić

22 April 2021 Game 2	Sloboda Užice (Serbia)	80–90	(Montenegro) Studentski centar	Podgorica
16:00	Scoring by quarter: 17–28, 21–26, 21–18, 21–18
	Pts: Ilić 18; Rebs: Stepanović 8 Asts: Vojinović 5 PIR: Ilić 18	Boxscore	Pts: Drobnjak, Pavličević 16; Rebs: Slavković 9 Asts: three players 3 PIR: Pavličević	Arena: Morača Sports Center; Referees: Luka Kardum, Krunoslav Peić, Tomislav Stapić

== Semifinals ==
=== Podgorica v Spars ===
23 April 2021 Game 1	Podgorica (Montenegro)	64–72	(Bosnia and Herzegovina) Spars	Podgorica
17:00	Scoring by quarter: 19–29, 13–17, 14–10, 18–16
	Pts: Čarapić 14; Rebs: Robinson 7 Asts: Musić 14; PIR: Musić 20	Boxscore	Pts: Gegić 20; Rebs: Kamenjaš 11; Asts: Zahiragić 11; PIR: Kamenjaš 26	Arena: Morača Sports Center; Attendance: 10; Referees: Josip Radojković, Luka Kardum, Branimir Galić

25 April 2021 Game 2	Spars (Bosnia and Herzegovina)	74–59	(Montenegro) Podgorica	Podgorica
16:00	Scoring by quarter: 17–6, 29–17, 17–23, 11–13
	Pts: Kamenjaš 23; Rebs: Kamenjaš 11; Asts: Zahiragić, Klavžar 8 PIR: Kamenjaš 35	Boxscore	Pts: Tmušić 12; Rebs: Kartalović 9 Asts: Musić 5 PIR: Musić 16	Arena: Morača Sports Center; Attendance: 10; Referees: Radoš Arsenijević, Ivan Stefanović, Stefan Ćalić

=== Mladost MaxBet v Studentski centar ===
24 April 2021 Game 1	Mladost MaxBet (Serbia)	85–86	(Montenegro) Studentski centar	Podgorica
19:00	Scoring by quarter: 15–24, 22–19, 30–13, 18–30
	Pts: Gombauld 22; Rebs: Gombauld 15; Asts: Mitchell 6 PIR: Gombauld 33	Boxscore	Pts: Barović 14; Rebs: Baćović 6 Asts: Pavličević 5 PIR: Barović, Tejić 18	Arena: Morača Sports Center; Referees: Mario Majkić, Krunoslav Peić, Nermin Nikšić

26 April 2021 Game 2	Studentski centar (Montenegro)	76–66	(Serbia) Mladost MaxBet	Podgorica
15:00	Scoring by quarter: 20–18, 17–17, 27–17, 12–14
	Pts: Baćović 19; Rebs: Baćović, Barović 8 Asts: three players 3 PIR: Baćović 28	Boxscore	Pts: Drechsel 19; Rebs: Gombauld 9 Asts: Mitchell 6 PIR: Drechsel 14	Arena: Morača Sports Center; Referees: Josip Radojković, Mario Majkić, Tomislav Stapić

== Finals ==
=== Game 1 ===
4 May 2021	Spars (Bosnia and Herzegovina)	89–99	(Montenegro) Studentski centar	Podgorica
16:00	Scoring by quarter: 22–21, 14–28, 25–25, 28–25
	Pts: Orelik 20; Rebs: Gegić 7 Asts: Zahiragić 9 PIR: Gegić 37	Boxscore	Pts: Pavličević 20; Rebs: Tejić 6 Asts: Pavličević 8 PIR: Tejić 27	Arena: Morača Sports Center; Attendance: 10; Referees: Milivoje Jovčić, Radoš Arsenijević, Stefan Ćalić

=== Game 2 ===
6 May 2021	Studentski centar (Montenegro)	71–72	(Bosnia and Herzegovina) Spars	Podgorica
16:00	Scoring by quarter: 21–13, 19–22, 17–19, 14–18
	Pts: Magee 16; Rebs: Tejić 14; Asts: Drobnjak 4 PIR: Tejić 22	Boxscore	Pts: Gegić 19; Rebs: Kamenjaš 12; Asts: Gegić 4 PIR: Kamenjaš 26	Arena: Morača Sports Center; Referees: Milan Nedović, Luka Kardum, Branimir Galić

== See also ==
- List of current ABA League Second Division team rosters
- 2021 ABA League Second Division Playout

2020–21 domestic competitions

- 2020–21 Basketball Championship of Bosnia and Herzegovina
- (Montenegro) 2020–21 Prva A liga
- (North Macedonia) 2020–21 Macedonian First League
- 2020–21 Basketball League of Serbia

== Notes ==
1. Koper Primorska won the ABA 2 League in the 2018–19 season. Due to COVID-19 pandemic the 2019–20 season was canceled. Koper Primorska had played the 2020–21 ABA League First Division before was disqualified from the competition and folded in December 2020.
