= List of foreign basketball players in Serbia =

This is a list of men's foreign players that play or have played in the top league in basketball clubs from the territory of Serbia.

In this list are included the foreign players that:

- Play or have played in the Serbian league system (from 2006 until nowadays), and in clubs from the territory of Serbia in the Serbia and Montenegro league system (including FR Yugoslavia, from 1992 until 2006) and in the Yugoslav league system (from 1945 until 1992).
- Have been part of the club roster in the league.
- Have been born in Serbia and capped by a foreign national team. This includes players that have dual citizenship.

Notes:

- Players from former Yugoslav republics (namely Bosnia and Herzegovina, Croatia, Montenegro, North Macedonia, and Slovenia) are excluded, except for those that have played in the National Basketball Association (NBA) or are naturalised.
- Players that have played in NBA are **bolded**.

== Summary ==
Africa

| Territory | No. of Players | Notes |
|---|---|---|
| Nigeria | 4 | |
| Benin | 1 | |
| Cameroon | 1 | |
| DR Congo | 1 | |
| Gabon | 1 | |
| Ghana | 1 | |
| Ivory Coast | 1 | Includes 1 U.S.-born Ivorian |
| Mali | 1 | |
| Senegal | 1 | |

Americas

| Territory | No. of Players | Notes |
|---|---|---|
| United States | 125 | Includes 1 foreign-born American |
| Canada | 4 | |
| Jamaica | 4 | Includes 1 foreign-born Jamaican |
| Belize | 1 | Includes 1 U.S.-born Belizean |
| Dominican Republic | 1 | Includes 1 U.S.-born Dominican |
| Colombia | 1 | |
| Guyana | 1 | |
| Mexico | 1 | |
| Panama | 1 | Includes 1 U.S.-born Panamanian |
| United States Virgin Islands | 1 | Includes 1 U.S.-born Virgin Islander |

Asia & the Pacific

| Territory | No. of Players | Notes |
|---|---|---|
| Australia | 10 | Includes 1 foreign-born Australian |
| New Zealand | 3 | |
| China | 1 | |
| Kazakhstan | 1 | |
| Qatar | 1 | Includes 1 U.S.-born Qatari |
| South Korea | 1 | Includes 1 U.S.-born South Korean |

Europe

| Territory | No. of Players | Notes |
|---|---|---|
| France | 9 | Includes 1 foreign-born French |
| Greece | 7 | Includes 2 foreign-born Greeks |
| Turkey | 6 | Includes 1 Serbia-born Turkish |
| Bulgaria | 5 | Includes 1 Serbia-born Bulgarian |
| Germany | 5 | Includes 2 foreign-born Germans |
| Russia | 5 | Includes 1 foreign-born Russian |
| Hungary | 4 | Includes 2 Serbia-born Hungarians |
| Israel | 3 | Includes 1 foreign-born Israeli |
| Czech Republic | 2 | Includes 1 U.S.-born Czech |
| Georgia | 2 | |
| Latvia | 2 | |
| Slovakia | 2 | |
| Sweden | 2 | |
| Ukraine | 2 | |
| Austria | 1 | |
| Belarus | 1 | |
| Belgium | 1 | |
| Denmark | 1 | |
| Finland | 1 | Includes 1 U.S.-born Finnish |
| Lithuania | 1 | |
| Portugal | 1 | |
| Switzerland | 1 | Includes 1 Serbia-born Swiss |
| United Kingdom | 1 | |

== Albania ==
- Dallas Moore – Partizan (2021–2022)

== Argentina ==
- **Facundo Campazzo** – Crvena zvezda (2022–present)
- Lautaro López – Borac Čačak (2021–2022)
- **Luca Vildoza** – Crvena zvezda (2022–present)

== Australia ==
- **Jonah Bolden** – FMP (2016–2017)
- **Dante Exum** – Partizan (2022–2023)
- Mirko Đerić – FMP (2016), Vršac (2016–2018), Dynamic (2018–2019)
- **Isaac Humphries** – FMP (2018)
- **Nathan Jawai** – Partizan (2010–2011)
- Venky Jois – Pirot (2021)
- **Jock Landale** – Partizan (2018–2019)
- Marial Mading – SPD Radnički (2020–2021)
- Aleks Marić – Partizan (2009–2010)
- Steven Marković – Crvena zvezda (2005–2008, 2009), Radnički Kragujevac (2010–2013)
- **Duop Reath** – FMP (2018–2020), Crvena zvezda (2020–2021)
- Tom Wilson – Partizan (2017)
- Mark Worthington – Radnički Kragujevac (2012–2013)

== Austria ==
- Luka Ašćerić – Mega (2018–2020)
- Neno Ašćerić – Crvena zvezda (2000)
- Bogić Vujošević – Novi Sad (2009–2011), Vojvodina Srbijagas (2011–2012), Radnički Beograd (2012–2013), Crnokosa (2013–2014)
- Aleksandar Đurić – Crvena zvezda (2003–2004)

== Belarus ==
- Mikalai Aliakseyeu – FMP Železnik (2002)
- Artsiom Parakhouski – Partizan (2019)

== Belgium ==
- David Filbiche – Tamiš (2019–2020)

== Belize ==
- **Milt Palacio** – Partizan (2007–2008, 2009)

== Benin ==
- Mouphtaou Yarou – Radnički Kragujevac (2013)

== Bosnia and Herzegovina ==
Only NBA and naturalised players are listed, for players with Wikipedia article, see: Category:Bosnia and Herzegovina expatriate basketball people in Serbia

- Alex Renfroe – Partizan (2018–2019)
- **Ratko Varda** – Partizan (1995–2001), Radnički Kragujevac (2012–2013), Mega (2013–2014), Dynamic (2017)

== Bulgaria ==
- Martin Durchev – Ergonom (2006–2007)
- Yordan Minchev – Vršac (2017)
- Branko Mirković – Smederevo (2003–2005)
- Martin Sotirov – Konstantin (2017–2018)
- Filip Videnov – Crvena zvezda (2009–2010), FMP Železnik (2010)

== Cameroon ==
- Robert Songolo Ngijol – Zlatibor (2017–2018)
- Landry Nnoko – Crvena zvezda (2020–present)

== Canada ==
- Shamiel Stevenson – Metalac (2021–2022)
- Ammanuel Diressa – FMP (2018–2019)
- Alexandar Živojin Danilović – Spartak (2021–present)
- Lazar Kojović – Spartak (2017–2018)
- Greg Newton – Lavovi (2003)
- Velimir Radinović – FMP Železnik (2004–2005), Vršac (2006–2007)

== Congo D.R. ==
- Gracin Bakumanya – Spartak (2018–2019)

== Congo R. ==
- David Oyona Ibandzo – Mladost Zemun (2021–present)

== Colombia ==
- Braian Angola – Partizan (2020)

== China ==
- Zhao Xuxin – Mladost Zemun (2017–2018), Beovuk (2018–2019)

== Croatia ==
Only national team players are listed, for players with Wikipedia article, see: Category:Croatian expatriate basketball people in Serbia

- Tomislav Gabrić – Metalac (2015–2016)
- **Oliver Lafayette** – Partizan (2010)
- Karlo Matković – OKK Beograd (2019–2020), Mega Basket (2020–2022)
- Ivo Nakić – Partizan (1986–1992)
- **Ivica Zubac** – Mega Basket (2016)

== Czech Republic ==
- Blake Schilb – Crvena zvezda (2013–2014)
- **Jan Veselý** – Partizan (2008–2011)

== Denmark ==
- Jonas Bergstedt – Dynamic (2018)

== Dominican Republic ==
- James Feldeine – Crvena zvezda (2017–2018)

== Finland ==
- Jamar Wilson – Partizan (2015–2016)

== France ==
- Malcolm Cazalon – Mega Basket (2020–present)
- Boris Dallo – Partizan (2013–2015)
- Stephane Gombauld – Mladost Zemun (2020–2021)
- Alpha Kaba – Mega Basket (2015–2017)
- **Joffrey Lauvergne** – Partizan (2012–2014)
- Mathias Lessort – Crvena zvezda (2017–2018), Partizan (2021–present)
- **Timothé Luwawu-Cabarrot** – Mega Basket (2015–2016)
- Predrag Materić – Partizan (2001–2002, 2003–2004), Vršac (2002–2003), Mega Basket (2005–2006)
- **Adam Mokoka** – Mega Basket (2018–2019)
- Emmanuel Monceau – Kolubara LA 2003 (2021)
- Renathan Ona Embo – Vršac (2019–2020)
- Bandja Sy – Partizan (2018–2019)
- Léo Westermann – Partizan (2012–2014)

== Gabon ==
- **Stéphane Lasme** – Partizan (2008–2009)

== Gambia ==
- Ousainou Sarr – Mladost Zemun (2020–present)

== Georgia ==
- Sergo Atuashvili – Vizura (2008–2009)
- Giorgi Bakradze – Tamiš (2021–present)
- **Goga Bitadze** – Smederevo (2016–2017), Mega (2017–2018; 2019)
- Duda Sanadze – Borac Čačak (2021–2022)
- Sandro Sanadze – Tamiš (2021)

== Germany ==
- Vladimir Bogojević – Partizan (2000)
- Dejan Bolović – Dunav (2017–2020)
- Amar Gegić – Partizan (2018–2019)
- Kostja Mushidi – Mega Basket (2016–2019), OKK Beograd (2019)
- Filip Stanić – Mega (2018–2019), OKK Beograd (2019)
- Maik Zirbes – Crvena zvezda (2014–2016, 2018–2019, 2021–2022)

== Ghana ==
- **Ben Bentil** – Crvena zvezda (2022–2023)
- **Amida Brimah** – Partizan (2018)

== Greece ==
- Vlado Janković – Mega (2008–2009)
- Ioannis Kouzeloglou – Partizan (2014–2015)
- Ntousan Koutsopoulos – Crvena zvezda (1991–1992, 2000–2001), FMP Železnik (2010–2011)
- Igor Milošević – Crvena zvezda (2005–2008)
- Ioannis Papapetrou – Partizan (2022–present)
- Stratos Perperoglou – Crvena zvezda (2018–2020)
- Sofoklis Schortsanitis – Crvena zvezda (2015)
- Kostas Stratakis – Beko (2015–2016), Srem (2016–2017), Proleter (2018), Radnički Beograd (2018–2019)
- Miloš Šakota – Slodes (2018–2020)
- Georgios Taousanis – Kolubara LA 2003 (2019–2020)
- Vlaikidis Vlasios – Novi Sad (199x)

== Guyana ==
- **Rawle Marshall** – Vršac (2007–2008)

== Haiti ==
- Schnider Hérard – Sloga (2020)

== Hungary ==
- Márton Báder – Vršac (2009)
- Kemal Karahodžić – Spartak (2007–2012)
- Nemanja Miščević – Spartak (2018–2019)
- István Németh – Vojvodina Srbijagas (2003–2004, 2006–2008)

== Israel ==
- Anton Kazarnovski – Sloboda (2018)
- Yam Madar – Partizan (2021–present)
- **Gal Mekel** – Crvena zvezda (2015)
- Guy Pnini – FMP Železnik (2008–2009)

== Ivory Coast ==
- Deon Thompson – Crvena zvezda (2017)

== Jamaica ==
- Dylan Ennis – Mega (2017), Crvena zvezda (2017–2018)
- Kimani Ffriend – FMP Železnik (2003–2004), Metalac (2012), Jagodina (2015–2016), OKK Beograd (2016), Dynamic (2016–2017)
- **Jerome Jordan** – Vršac (2010–2011)
- **Samardo Samuels** – Partizan (2017)

== Kazakhstan ==
- Anton Ponomarev – FMP Železnik (2010)

== Latvia ==
- **Dāvis Bertāns** – Partizan (2012–2014)
- **Rodions Kurucs** – Partizan (2021–2022)
- Žanis Peiners – Partizan (2019–2020)

== Lebanon ==
- Jad Khalil – Kolubara LA 2003 (2020–2021), Sloga (2022–present)
- Mitchell Tabet – Novi Pazar (2020)

== Lithuania ==
- Aurimas Majauskas – Dynamic (2017)
- Paulius Valinskas – FMP (2022–present)

== Mali ==
- Sidiki Kone – Mladost Zemun (2019–2020), Sloga (2020)

== Mexico ==
- **Horacio Llamas** – Crvena zvezda (2002)

== Montenegro ==
Only NBA and naturalised players are listed, for players with Wikipedia article, see: Category:Montenegrin expatriate basketball people in Serbia

- **Žarko Čabarkapa** – Atlas (1997–2001)
- **Omar Cook** – Crvena zvezda (2007–2008)
- **Predrag Drobnjak** – Partizan (1992–1998, 2006–2007)
- **Nikola Peković** – Atlas (2003–2004), Mega Basket (2004–2005), Partizan (2005–2008, 2011)
- Kendrick Perry – Mega (2019–2020)
- Taylor Rochestie – Crvena zvezda (2017–2018, 2020)
- **Marko Simonović** – Mega Basket (2019–2021)
- **Slavko Vraneš** – FMP Železnik (1997–2000), Crvena zvezda (2004), Partizan (2007–2010), Metalac (2013, 2017–2018)

== New Zealand ==
- Finn Delany – FMP (2019)
- Paul Henare – OKK Beograd (2002–2003)
- Corey Webster – Mega (2015)

== Nigeria ==
- **Josh Akognon** – Partizan (2015)
- Tunji Awojobi – Crvena zvezda (2005)
- **Obinna Ekezie** – Crvena zvezda (2002–2003)
- Martins Igbanu – Mladost Zemun (2020–2021)
- Ebuka Izundu – FMP (2021–present)
- Michael Ojo – FMP (2017–2018), Crvena zvezda (2018–2020)
- David Onuorah – Novi Pazar (2021)

== North Macedonia ==
Only NBA and naturalised players are listed, for players with Wikipedia article, see: Category:Macedonian expatriate basketball people in Serbia

- **Pero Antić** – Crvena zvezda (2005–2007, 2017–2018)
- Bo McCalebb – Partizan (2009–2010)

== Panama ==
- Chris Warren – FMP Železnik (2005)

== Poland ==
- Aleksander Balcerowski – Mega (2021–2022)

== Portugal ==
- João Soares – Vizura (2008–2009)

== Puerto Rico ==
- **John Holland** – Crvena zvezda (2022–present)

== Qatar ==
- **Trey Johnson** – Vršac (2007–2008)

== Russia ==
- Giorgi Buyukliev – Bor
- Pavel Gromyko – Crvena zvezda (2007–2008)
- Aleksei Kotishevskiy – Radnički Kragujevac (2009–2010)
- Pavel Lobarev – Zlatibor (2018–2019), Spartak (2019), Vojvodina (2019–2020)
- Samson Ruzhentsev – Mega (2021–2022)
- Ivan Slutsky – FMP (2017–2018), Metalac (2018)

== Senegal ==
- Mouhammad Faye – Crvena zvezda (2018–2020)

== Slovakia ==
- Vladimír Brodziansky – Partizan (2022–present)
- Michal Čekovský – Partizan (2011–2013)
- Peter Sedmák – Dynamic (2017)

== Slovenia ==
Only NBA and naturalised players are listed, for players with Wikipedia article, see: Category:Slovenian expatriate basketball people in Serbia

- Aleksandar Ćapin – Radnički Kragujevac (2012–2013), Dynamic (2017)
- **Vlatko Čančar** – Mega (2016–2018)
- **Radoslav Nesterović** – Partizan (1992–1993)
- Alen Omić – Crvena zvezda (2018)

== South Korea ==
- Moon Tae-jong – Vršac (2009–2010)

== Spain ==
- **Lorenzo Brown** – Crvena zvezda (2019–2020)
- Quino Colom – Crvena zvezda (2020–2021)

== Sweden ==
- Anton Gaddefors – Radnički Kragujevac (2010–2012)

== Switzerland ==
- Dušan Mlađan – Radnički Kragujevac (2013–2014)
- Andrija Nešović – Dunav (2019–2021), Slodes (2021–present)

== Turkey ==
- Mert Akay – Dynamic (2019–present)
- Emre Bayav – Crvena zvezda (2004–2005)
- Yunus Çankaya – Radnički Kragujevac (2011)
- Duşan Cantekin – Mega (2014–2015)
- **Semih Erden** – Partizan (2004–2005)
- Cem Han – Novi Pazar (2018)
- Alp Oktay – Dunav (2022–present)
- Yiğit Onan – Dynamic (2021–2022)
- Erbey Paltaci – Novi Pazar (2021–present)
- Okben Ulubay – FMP (2019–2020)

== Ukraine ==
- Roman Gumenyuk – Mega (2005–2006)
- Oleksandr Kobzystyi – OKK Beograd (2021–2022), Mega (2022–present)
- Oleksandr Lypovyy – Crvena zvezda (2014)

== United Kingdom ==
- Matthew Bryan-Amaning – Radnički Kragujevac (2012–2013)

== United States ==
- Mustafa Abdul-Hamid – Vršac (2010–2011)
- Tracy Abrams – Sloboda (2018–2019)
- Hassan Adams – Vojvodina Srbijagas (2009)
- **Jaylen Adams** – Crvena zvezda (2022)
- Morris Almond – Crvena zvezda (2012)
- Isaiah Austin – FMP (2017)
- Maurice Bailey – Crvena zvezda (2009)
- Billy Baron – Crvena zvezda (2018–2020)
- Gabriel Bealer – Vršac (2019–2020)
- Beau Beech – FMP (2022–present)
- Justin Bibbins – Mladost Zemun (2019)
- Noah Blackwell – Zdravlje (2021–present)
- Cinmeon Bowers – FMP (2018–2019)
- Brandon Bowman – FMP Železnik (2011)
- Devin Brooks – Dynamic (2017)
- **Anthony Brown** – Partizan (2018)
- **Derrick Brown** – Crvena zvezda (2019–2020)
- Gerald Brown – Partizan (2003–2004, 2005)
- James Bruson – FMP Železnik (2002–2003)
- **Antonio Burks** – Crvena zvezda (2006–2007)
- Michael Campbell – Vršac (2002–2003), Crvena zvezda (2003)
- **Chris Carr** – Lavovi (2002–2003)
- Cody Carlson – Mladost Zemun (2022–present)
- Jahii Carson – Metalac (2015)
- Simeon Carter – Novi Pazar (2020–2021)
- Olin Carter III – Napredak Aleksinac (2021)
- Orlando Coleman – SPD Radnički (2017–2018)
- Robert Conley – Vršac (2005–2006)
- Peter Cornell – Partizan (2001)
- Schea Cotton – Partizan (2001)
- Jason Crowe – Sloga (2000–2001)
- **Vonteego Cummings** – Vršac (2004–2005), Partizan (2006–2007), Vojvodina Srbijagas (2009)
- Jawan Davis – Napredak Kruševac (2016–2017)
- Eric Davis Jr. – Mladost Zemun (2018)
- DeAndre Dickson – Napredak Aleksinac (2021)
- Lucas Doyle – Metalac (2018)
- Trey Drechsel – Mladost Zemun (2019–2021), Partizan (2021)
- Damond Edwards – Partizan (2005–2006)
- Dekabriean Eldridge – Dynamic (2017)
- Daymeon Fishback – Crvena zvezda (2000–2001)
- Charron Fisher – Vojvodina Srbijagas (2008–2009)
- Demonte Flannigan – Pirot (2020)
- Khwan Fore – Kolubara LA 2003 (2021)
- Tervin Foster – Sloboda (2019–2020)
- Trent Frazier – FMP (2022–present)
- Shane Gibson – Mladost Zemun (2021–2022)
- James Gist – Partizan (2010–2011), Crvena zvezda (2019–2020)
- **Drew Gordon** – Partizan (2012–2013)
- Jamont Gordon – Partizan (2017)
- **Paul Grant** – Vojvodina Srbijagas (2003)
- Tyree Griffin – Mladost Zemun (2019–2020)
- Langston Hall – Crvena zvezda (2020–2021)
- Hunter Hale – Borac (2021–present)
- Simeon Haley – Crvena zvezda (1997)
- Supreme Hannah – Kolubara LA 2003 (2022–present)
- Jaylen Hands – FMP (2021)
- Will Hatcher – Partizan (2016–2017)
- Patrick Hardy – Tamiš (2021–2022), Spartak (2022–present)
- Gregory Harris – Vojvodina Srbijagas (2006–2007)
- Gerrod Henderson – Vršac (2003–2004), Crvena zvezda (2004–2005, 2006)
- Cordell Henry – Lavovi (2003–2004)
- Kyle Hill – Vršac (2010)
- Delonte Holland – Atlas (2004–2005)
- Austin Hollins – Crvena zvezda (2021–2022)
- James Holmes – Mega (2006–2007)
- Fred House – Partizan (2002–2004)
- Cornelius Hudson – Zdravlje (2021–present)
- Mahmoud Jameel – Sloga (2000–2001)
- Dominic James – Partizan (2012)
- **Charles Jenkins** – Crvena zvezda (2013–2015, 2016–2017, 2019–2020), FMP (2022–present)
- DeVaughn Jenkins – Vršac (2020–2021)
- Curtis Jerrells – Partizan (2010–2011)
- Leonard Johnson – Vojvodina Srbijagas (2002–2003)
- Bryce Jones – Borac (2019–2021), FMP (2021–2022)
- **Dwayne Jones** – Crvena zvezda (2009)
- Kendrick Jones – Napredak Kruševac (2011–2012)
- **Kevin Jones** – Partizan (2015–2016)
- John Jordan – Tamiš (2021)
- David Kadiri – Sloboda (2018–2019)
- DeAndre Kane – Mega (2020)
- Jamaal King – Sloga (2020)
- **Tarence Kinsey** – Partizan (2013–2014), Crvena zvezda (2016)
- **Acie Law** – Partizan (2011–2012)
- Otis Livingston II – Mladost Zemun (2021–present)
- Zach LeDay – Partizan (2021–present)
- Michael Lee – Radnički Kragujevac (2010–2011)
- William Lee – Dynamic (2018–2019)
- **Jordan Loyd** – Crvena zvezda (2020–2021)
- **Kalin Lucas** – Crvena zvezda (2020)
- Jimbo Lull – Sloboda (2020)
- Marcus LoVett Jr. – Sloboda (2018–2019)
- Michael Mallory – Novi Pazar (2019–2020)
- Ricardo Marsh – Crvena zvezda (2010–2011)
- Hassan Martin – Crvena zvezda (2022–present)
- Alex Marzette – FMP (2018–2019), Novi Pazar (2019)
- **James Michael McAdoo** – Partizan (2020)
- Trey McBride – SPD Radnički (2021)
- Kyran McClure – Novi Pazar (2020–2021)
- Brandon McCoy – Zlatibor (2021)
- Antonio Meeking – Vršac (2005)
- **Eric Mika** – Partizan (2020–2021)
- **Quincy Miller** – Crvena zvezda (2015–2016)
- Patrick Miller – Partizan (2017–2018)
- Codi Miller-McIntyre – Partizan (2020–2021)
- Ashton Mitchell – Metalac (2014)
- Kwamain Mitchell – Mladost Zemun (2020–2021)
- **Isaiah Morris** – Crvena zvezda (2001–2002)
- **Adam Morrison** – Crvena zvezda (2011)
- William Mosley – Partizan (2019–2021)
- Wesley Myers – Kolubara (2019–2020)
- Anthony Myles – Crvena zvezda (2010–2011)
- Nickolas Neal – Vojvodina (2021–present)
- **DeMarcus Nelson** – Crvena zvezda (2012–2014)
- Tyrone Nesby – FMP Železnik (2004)
- Garrett Nevels – FMP (2021–2022)
- Dayon Ninkovic – Crvena zvezda (1998)
- **James Nunnally** – Partizan (2022–present)
- Larry O'Bannon – Crvena zvezda (2005–2006)
- **Johnny O'Bryant** – Crvena zvezda (2020–2021)
- Marvin O'Connor – Partizan (2002–2003)
- **Andre Owens** – Crvena zvezda (2008–2009)
- **Marcus Paige** – Partizan (2018–2021)
- Brandon Peterson – Vršac (2020–2021)
- Paul Peterson – Proleter (2011–2012)
- Brandon Penn – Kolubara (2019–2020)
- Scoonie Penn – Crvena zvezda (2002–2003)
- Josh Perkins – Partizan (2021)
- **Kasib Powell** – FMP Železnik (2003)
- Brevin Pritzl – Tamiš (2020–2021)
- Kevin Punter – Crvena zvezda (2019–2020), Partizan (2021–present)
- Joe Ragland – Crvena zvezda (2018–2019)
- Patrick Rembert – Novi Pazar (2020–2021)
- Kyle Randall – Konstantin (2016–2017)
- Reggie Redding – Partizan (2019–2020)
- Jeremiah Rivers – Mega (2011–2012)
- K. C. Rivers – Crvena zvezda (2019)
- **Lawrence Roberts** – Crvena zvezda (2008–2009), Partizan (2009–2010)
- Frank Robinson – Partizan (2016–2017)
- LaQuinton Ross – Zlatibor (2021–present)
- Jarrid Rhodes – Tamiš (2019–2020)
- Ahmaad Rorie – Mega (2022–present)
- Maverick Rowan – FMP (2017)
- Michael Scott – Radnički Kragujevac (2011–2012), Crvena zvezda (2012–2013)
- Cortez Seales – Sloboda (2019–2020)
- D.J. Seeley – Radnički Kragujevac (2013–2014)
- David Simon – Radnički Kragujevac (2011–2012)
- Anthony Smith – Borac (2020–2021)
- **Charles Smith** – Crvena zvezda (1996)
- **Mike Smith** – FMP Železnik (2003–2004)
- Scoochie Smith – Mega (2020–2022)
- Blake Stepp – Partizan (2004–2005)
- Kebu Stewart – Vojvodina Srbijagas (2003–2005), Crvena zvezda (2007)
- Ibrahima Sylla – Dynamic (2019)
- **Butch Taylor** – Partizan (1977–1978)
- James Taylor – Sloga (2012)
- **Emanuel Terry** – Crvena zvezda (2020)
- **Billy Thomas** – Crvena zvezda (2006–2007)
- Omar Thomas – Crvena zvezda (2011–2012)
- Rashawn Thomas – Partizan (2019–2021)
- Torey Thomas – Partizan (2012)
- Ryan Thompson – Crvena zvezda (2015)
- Derryck Thornton – Borac (2020–2021)
- Darryl Tucker – Mladost Zemun (2019–2020)
- Johnnie Vassar – Vršac (2019)
- Kwame Vaughn – Partizan (2018)
- Kyle Visser – Radnički Kragujevac (2013)
- Corey Walden – Partizan (2019–2020), Crvena zvezda (2020–2021)
- Kevin Ware – Novi Pazar (2021)
- Desi Washington – Dynamic (2017–2018)
- Tyrone Washington – Crvena zvezda (2002)
- Aaron White – Crvena zvezda (2021–present)
- Davin White – Radnički Kragujevac (2009)
- Terrico White – Radnički Kragujevac (2012–2013)
- Darrell Williams – Partizan (2016)
- Devaugntah Williams – Spartak (2018–2019)
- **Marcus Williams** – Crvena zvezda (2014–2015)
- **Nigel Williams-Goss** – Partizan (2017–2018)
- Andrew Wisniewski – Crvena zvezda (2004–2005)
- **Nate Wolters** – Crvena zvezda (2016–2017, 2021–2022)
- Duane Woodward – FMP Železnik (2010)
- Renaldo Woolridge – Metalac (2014)
- Rashad Wright – Vršac (2005–2006)
- Jahmar Young – Crvena zvezda (2010–2011)

== Virgin Islands, United States ==
- Reggie Freeman – FMP Železnik (2002–2003, 2003–2005), Crvena zvezda (2003), Vojvodina Srbijagas (2005), Metalac (2009)

== See also ==
- List of foreign NBA players
- List of current Basketball League of Serbia team rosters
- List of foreign football players in Serbia

== Notes ==
1. Born in Andorra
2. Born in Belgium
3. Born in Bosnia and Herzegovina
4. Born in SR Bosnia and Herzegovina (then Socialist Federal Republic of Yugoslavia)
5. Born in Cameroon
6. Born in Canada
7. Born in Kyrgyzstan (then part of the Soviet Union)
8. Born in Martinique (Overseas department of the French Republic)
9. Born in Russia (then part of the Soviet Union)
10. Born in SR Serbia (then Socialist Federal Republic of Yugoslavia)
11. Born in Serbia (then Federal Republic of Yugoslavia)
12. Born in South Sudan (then part of Sudan)
13. Born in Turkey
14. Born in the United States of America
