= 2020–21 Basketball Cup of Serbia =

2020–21 Cup of Serbia
- Season: 2020–21
- Duration: 17 December 2020 – 27 January 2021
- Games played: 7
- Teams: 8

Finals
- Champions: Vojvodina (1st title)
- Runners-up: Radnički Kragujevac
- Semifinalists: Mladost Zemun; OKK Beograd

The 2020–21 Basketball Cup of Serbia is the 15th season of the Serbian 2nd-tier men's cup tournament.

The draw was held on 11 December 2020. In the final, Vojvodina won over Radnički Kragujevac.

== Bracket ==
Quarterfinals
17 December 2020
Vojvodina	20
Napredak JKP	0
24 December 2020
Hercegovac	62
OKK Beograd	81
30 December 2020
Fair Play	85
Radnički Kragujevac	88
21 December 2020
Klik	58
Mladost Zemun	89

Semifinals
20 January 2021
Vojvodina	94
OKK Beograd	56
12 January 2021
Radnički Kragujevac	98
Mladost Zemun	87

Final
27 January 2021
Vojvodina	103
Radnički Kragujevac	72

Source: SrbijaSport

== Quarterfinals ==
All times are local UTC+1.

=== Vojvodina v Napredak JKP ===
17 December 2020
19:30

Vojvodina	20–0	Napredak JKP

SPC Vojvodina Small Hall, Novi Sad
Referees: Marko Strika, Stefan Ćalić, Nemanja Vlahović

The match was not played, and Napredak JKP forfeited 0–20.

=== Hercegovac v OKK Beograd ===
24 December 2020
18:00

Boxscore

Hercegovac	62–81	OKK Beograd
Scoring by quarter: 12–25, 11–22, 20–14, 19–20
Pts: Predrag Radovanović 21; Rebs: Predrag Radovanović 9 Asts: Uroš Teofanović 4		Pts: Nikola Dragović 15; Rebs: Luka Paunović 8 Asts: Luka Paunović 7

Gajdobra Sports Hall, Gajdobra
Attendance: 10
Referees: Marko Pecelj, Duško Sedlar, Vladimir Tomić

=== Fair Play v Radnički Kragujevac ===
30 December 2020
14:30

Boxscore

Fair Play	85–88	Radnički Kragujevac
Scoring by quarter: 22–13, 22–23, 17–22, 24–30
Pts: Stojan Dodić 25; Rebs: Miloš Stojanović 15; Asts: three players 5		Pts: Nikola Veljović 31; Rebs: Stefan Đorđević 10; Asts: Stefan Đorđević 6

Dušan Radović School Hall, Niš
Attendance: 10
Referees: Aleksandar Milojević, Stevan Krstić, Đorđe Bogojević

Originally to be scheduled to 23 December, it was postponed and rescheduled to 30 December.

=== Klik v Mladost Zemun ===
21 December 2020
17:00

Boxscore

Klik	58–89	Mladost Zemun
Scoring by quarter: 15–25, 8–24, 20–16, 15–24
Pts: Dejan Bjelić 19; Rebs: Dejan Bjelić 10; Asts: Petar Grojić 4		Pts: Trey Drechsel 20; Rebs: Dušan Tanasković 11; Asts: Miloje Jakovljević 3

Arilje Sports Hall, Arilje
Attendance: Behind closed doors
Referees: Dejan Mizdrak, Strahinja Dašić, Jovan Kovačević

== Semifinals ==
All times are local UTC+1.

=== Vojvodina v OKK Beograd ===
20 January 2021
19:30

Boxscore

Vojvodina	94–56	OKK Beograd
Scoring by quarter: 17–13, 26–13, 32–12, 19–18
Pts: Bjelica, Beslać 16; Rebs: three players 4 Asts: Marko Ljubičić 12		Pts: Nikola Đurišić 18; Rebs: Dragović, Brekić 6 Asts: Marko Boltić 5

SPC Vojvodina, Novi Sad
Attendance: 10
Referees: Siniša Prpa, Radoš Arsenijević, Stefan Ćalić

Originally to be scheduled to 13 January 2021, it was postponed and rescheduled to 20 January.

=== Radnički Kragujevac v Mladost Zemun ===
12 January 2021
17:00

Boxscore

Radnički Kragujevac	98–87	Mladost Zemun
Scoring by quarter: 24–27, 26–20, 26–23, 22–17
Pts: Andreja Stevanović 29; Rebs: Jovanović, Nedeljković 11; Asts: Matija Popović 9		Pts: Matija Belić 19; Rebs: Stephane Gombauld 10; Asts: Luka Mitrović 13

Jezero Hall, Kragujevac
Attendance: Behind closed doors
Referees: Ivan Stefanović, Aleksandar Milojević, Vojkan Živković

== Final ==
27 January 2021
16:30

Boxscore

Radnički Kragujevac	72–103	Vojvodina
Scoring by quarter: 12–19, 25–32, 13–28, 22–24
Pts: Stevanović, Nedeljković 16; Rebs: Stefan Đorđević 8 Asts: Nikola Veljović 7		Pts: Dušan Beslać 25; Rebs: Savić, Beslać 6 Asts: Marko Ljubičić 8

Jezero Hall, Kragujevac
Referees: Aleksandar Milojević, Vojkan Živković, Đorđe Bogojević

== See also ==
- 2020–21 Radivoj Korać Cup
- 2020–21 Basketball League of Serbia
