= Karačići =

Karačići may refer to:

- Karačići (Rogatica)
- Karačići (Srebrenica)

== See also ==
- Karačić, a surname
