= Đorđe Milosavljević =

Đorđe Milosavljević may refer to:

- Đorđe Milosavljević (basketball) (born 1994), Serbian basketball player
- Đorđe Milosavljević (writer) (born 1969), Serbian screenwriter and film director
