= Karačić =

Karačić is a surname. Notable people with the surname include:

- Branko Karačić (born 1960), Croatian retired footballer and football manager
- Fran Karačić (born 1996), Croatian-Australian professional soccer player
- Goran Karačić (born 1996), professional footballer from Bosnia and Herzegovina
- Igor Karačić (born 1988), Croatian handball player
- Ivan Karačić (born 1985), Bosnian handball player
- Ivan Karačić (basketball) (born 1996), Croatian player

== See also ==
- Karačić (Zavidovići), a village in Zavidovići municipality
- Karačići (disambiguation)
