= Dragan Radović (disambiguation) =

Dragan Radović may refer to:

- Dragan Radović (basketball) (born 1976), Montenegrin basketball player and coach
- Dragan Radović (born 1976), Montenegrin footballer
- Dragan Radovich (born 1956), Croatian-American footballer
