= Radinović =

Radinović (Cyrillic script: Радиновић) is a surname derived from a masculine given name Radin. It may refer to:

- Duško Radinović (born 1963), footballer
- Kujava Radinović, second wife of King Stephen Ostoja of Bosnia
- Pavle Radinović (sometimes spelled Radenović) (1381–1415), magnate in the Kingdom of Bosnia
- Uglješa Radinović (born 1993), football midfielder
- Vanja Radinović (born 1972), football coach
- Velimir Radinović (born 1981), basketball player
