= List of foreign players in Serbia =

The List of foreign players in Serbia may refer to:

- List of foreign basketball players in Serbia
- List of foreign football players in Serbia
