= Nikola Bulatović =

Montenegrin basketball player and coach

Podgorica
- Title: General manager
- League: ABA League Second Division; Prva A Liga

Personal information
- Born: August 28, 1971 (age 55) Titograd, SR Montenegro, SFR Yugoslavia
- Listed height: 2.12 m (6 ft 11 1/2 in)
- Listed weight: 105 kg (231 lb)

Career information
- NBA draft: 1993: undrafted
- Playing career: 1990–2010
- Position: Center

Career history

Playing
- 1990–1993: Budućnost Podgorica
- 1993–1994: Profikolor
- 1994–1995: Partizan
- 1996–1998: FMP Železnik
- 1998–2000: Budućnost Podgorica
- 2000–2001: Partizan Belgrade
- 2001–2002: Montepaschi
- 2002–2003: Hapoel Tel Aviv
- 2003–2004: Azovmash Mariupol
- 2004–2005: CSU Asesoft Ploieşti
- 2005–2006: AEL Limassol
- 2006–2007: Igokea
- 2007–2010: Beovuk

Coaching
- 2019–2020: Lovćen 1947 (General Manager)
- 2020–present: Podgorica (General Manager)
Medals
Men's basketball
Representing (Federal Republic of Yugoslavia) FR Yugoslavia
European Championships
Gold medal – first place	1997 Spain	National Team
World Championships
Gold medal – first place	1998 Athens	National Team

Nikola Bulatović (born August, 28 1971) is a Montenegrin former basketball player, who is a current General Manager for Podgorica of the Prva A Liga and the ABA League Second Division.

== Playing career ==
Bulatović started his career in his hometown team Budućnost Podgorica. He was part of Partizan Belgrade squad that won national league and cup in 1994–95 season. He helped FMP Železnik to win their first national cup trophy in 1997 before returning to Budućnost, where he won two consecutive national titles. He returned to Partizan for the 2000–01 season before moving abroad, to Italian side Montepaschi Siena. He was the part of the side that won the last ever Saporta Cup trophy. Next season he played for Israeli side Hapoel Tel Aviv. In 2003 he signed for Greek club Apollon Patras but was released in August, before the season even started. Next few months he spent in Ukraine, in Azovmash Mariupol, before getting released in February 2004. Next month he rejoined his first club, Budućnost, but left soon without playing single game. He went to Romanian club CSU Asesoft Ploieşti where he was part of the squad that won EuroCup Challenge in 2005. Next season he started in Cyprus playing for AEL Limassol, in January 2006 he made a brief return to Asesoft Ploieşti, and month later he signed with Igokea from Bosnia. His last known club was Beovuk, a lower league club from Belgrade.

== National team career ==
Bulatović won gold medals at both the 1997 European Championship and 1998 World championship with the Yugoslavian national team.

== Managerial career ==
In August 2019, Bulatović joined Lovćen 1947 as an assistant coach.

In 2020, Bulatović was added to the staff of Podgorica as a General Manager of the team.

== Personal life ==
=== Rape case ===
In 1998, Bulatović was charged with rape, a criminal accusation he was subsequently found guilty of in two separate trials. The event in question took place on 27 May 1998 in his Belgrade apartment where, as determined in two Belgrade District Court trials, the 27-year-old FMP Železnik center Bulatović raped the underage 15-year-old gymnasium student N.S. who showed up to his apartment with the intention of completing an earlier commenced interview for a school paper. She was of legal age of consent for sexual activity according to Serbian laws at the time. Bulatović pleaded not guilty, claiming the sexual intercourse with N.S. was consensual.

The investigation process at the Belgrade District Court was presided by the investigating judge Dobrivoje Gerasimović. At the very first discovery session, led by the club's owner and president Nebojša Čović, the entire FMP Železnik player roster showed up at the courthouse in support of Bulatović. Over the subsequent few months, during the summer transfer window, Bulatović—who simultaneously made the FR Yugoslavia national team for the 1998 World Championship—transferred to KK Budućnost, a move that entailed relocation from Belgrade to Podgorica and was seen by some as an attempt to evade responsibility. With Bulatović charged with rape, the first court date of the trial at the Belgrade District Court took place on 23 September 1998, with Bulatović absent due to professional obligations with Budućnost. He showed up at the next court date, held on 19 October 1998, providing testimony for two hours. In December 1998, the trial concluded with Bulatović sentenced to three years in prison.

On appeal, the verdict was overturned and the new trial in June 2003 resulted in a 5-year sentence for Bulatović. Explaining the increased length of the second sentence, judge Dragoljub Albijanić—presiding over the Belgrade District Court judicial council that passed down the verdict—stated that the circumstances of the accused being a national team member when committing the crime as well as the victim suffering long term psychological effects were taken as aggravating factors.

After another appeal, the case went before the Serbian Supreme Court where the lower court's verdict was confirmed in January 2006. With the dissolution of the Serbia and Montenegro state union later that year, the case was transferred to the newly independent Montenegro's judicial system in accordance with Bulatović's primary place of residence in Podgorica, Montenegro. Podgorica Lower Court thus became responsible for processing the stipulations in the verdict, but reportedly failed to do so in timely manner.

In May 2009, at the Belgrade District Court's urging—with Bulatović still a free man more than three years after the final verdict—an Interpol arrest warrant was issued for his capture.

After two and half years on Interpol's wanted list, Bulatović was arrested in Santo Domingo, Dominican Republic in December 2011. Within days, he was extradited to Montenegro where he began serving his 5-year sentence. He was released from Spuž prison in November 2015 having served four years and fifteen days, an early release reportedly due to the expiry of statute of limitations.
