= Spuž =

Spuž Спуж
- Town
- Location within Montenegro
- Coordinates: 42°30′29″N 19°11′38″E
- Country: Montenegro
- Municipality: Danilovgrad

Population (2011)
  - Town: 1,696
- Time zone: UTC+1 (CET)
  - Summer (DST): UTC+2 (CEST)
- Postal code: 81412

Spuž (Montenegrin Cyrillic: Спуж) is a small town seated near Zeta river, within the municipality of Danilovgrad in the central Montenegrin region.

== Overview ==
It is located halfway between Podgorica and Danilovgrad, in the Bjelopavlići valley. It was part of the Ottoman Empire between 1474 and 1878 and was kaza centre in Sanjak of Scutari before joining the Principality of Montenegro as "İşpozi".

It is known as the location of the Spuž prison complex (Zavod za izdržavanje kaznenih sankcija - ZIKS), the largest facility of that kind in Montenegro.

== History ==
In the 16th century, the population was composed of Serbs, Turks and Albanians. Albanian settlers were noted to have their own mahalas (neighborhoods) within Spuž and Onogošt (Nikšić).

== Demographics ==
According to the 2011 census, its population was 1,696.

Ethnicity in 2011
Ethnicity	Number	Percentage
Montenegrins	931	54.9%
Serbs	636	37.5%
Croats	13	0.8%
Macedonians	6	0.4%
other/undeclared	110	6.5%
Total	1,696	100%

== Sports ==
The local football team is OFK Spuž, who play in the country's third tier. Former team Zora Spuž played in the second tier.

== Transportation ==
Town is also a stop on Nikšić–Podgorica railway.

== Notable people ==
- Mileva Filipović - sociologist and gender studies pioneer (1938-2020)
