= Nikola Žižić (basketball) =

Montenegrin basketball player

Benicarló
- Position: Shooting guard
- League: LEB Plata

Personal information
- Born: February 17, 1994 (age 32) Nikšić, Montenegro, FR Yugoslavia
- Listed height: 2.00 m (6 ft 7 in)
- Listed weight: 90 kg (198 lb)

Career information
- NBA draft: 2016: undrafted
- Playing career: 2010–present

Career history
- 2010–2012: Podgorica
- 2012–2016: Sutjeska
- 2016–2017: FMP
- 2018–2019: Dynamic BG
- 2021–2022: Metalac
- 2022–present: Benicarló

Nikola Žižić (born February 17, 1994) is a Montenegrin professional basketball player for Benicarló of the LEB Plata.

== Professional career ==
During 2016–17 season Žižić played for FMP. On December 17, 2018, he signed for Dynamic VIP PAY.
