= Ivan Slutsky =

Russian basketball player

Free agent
- Position: Shooting guard / small forward

Personal information
- Born: January 4, 1997 (age 29) Moscow, Russia
- Listed height: 2.01 m (6 ft 7 in)
- Listed weight: 82 kg (181 lb)

Career information
- NBA draft: 2019: undrafted
- Playing career: 2015–present

Career history
- 2015–2017: Khimki B
- 2017–2018: FMP
- 2018: Metalac
- 2019–2020: Urartu Vivaro

Ivan Mikhaylovich Slutsky (Russian: Иван Михайлович Слуцкий; born January 4, 1997), also credited as Slutskii, is a Russian professional basketball player.

== Playing career ==
Slutsky played for the Khimki B team. Also, he previously played for their cadet and junior team.

On August 23, 2017, Slutsky signed a multi-year deal with Serbian club FMP. He is the first ever Russian player to join FMP. He made his Adriatic League debut for FMP on February 5, 2018, in a game against the Crvena zvezda mts where he played 10 minutes and scored 2 points. He left the team in August 2018.

== International career ==
Slutsky was a member of the Russia national under-16 and under-18 team.

== See also ==
- List of foreign basketball players in Serbia
