= Novak Musić =

Serbian basketball player

No. 38 – Vojvodina
- Position: Point guard
- League: KLS

Personal information
- Born: May 27, 1998 (age 28) Belgrade, Serbia, FR Yugoslavia
- Listed height: 1.88 m (6 ft 2 in)

Career information
- NBA draft: 2020: undrafted
- Playing career: 2016–present

Career history
- 2016–2021: Mega Basket
- 2016–2017: →Smederevo 1953
- 2017–2018: →Beovuk 72
- 2018–2019: →OKK Beograd
- 2019: →Igokea
- 2019–2020: → OKK Beograd
- 2020–2021: →Podgorica
- 2021–2023: Arka Gdynia
- 2023–2024: Zastal Zielona Góra
- 2024–2025: FC Argeș Pitești
- 2025–2026: Patrioti Levice
- 2026: Igokea
- 2026–present: Vojvodina

Career highlights
- Bosnian Cup winner (2019)

Novak Musić (Serbian Cyrillic: Новак Мусић; born May 27, 1998) is a Serbian professional basketball player for Vojvodina.

== Professional career ==
Novak started playing basketball in the younger categories of Zvezdara M-Invest, after which he moved on to play at Mega Basket where he got through all the junior and senior categories and even participated at the Euroleague Basketball Next Generation Tournament in Rome in 2015 and in Berlin in 2016.

He was a part of the Mega Basket team that won the 2015–16 Radivoj Korać Cup in Niš, though he was only on the bench during the final game against Partizan.

After that, he was loaned to several clubs from the Basketball League of Serbia including KK Smederevo 1953, KK Beovuk 72 and OKK Beograd. In the latter, he made the biggest impact having spent two seasons with a small break in between where he played for KK Igokea where he won the Bosnian National Cup at the end of the season 2018-19 and then he played only two games for Mega Basket at the beginning of the following season, after which he returned to OKK Beograd.

In OKK Beograd during the season of 2018-19, he averaged 14.6 points per game with 3.8 rebounds and 5.0 assists. During the next season, he was even better averaging 16.0 points per game with a total of 3.8 rebounds and 4.0 assists.

Novak then went on to play in KK Podgorica and gained a place in the semifinal of the 2020–21 ABA League Second Division. After that, he played for the Polish side Arka Gdynia and had an average of 11.6 points with 3.1 rebounds and 4.7 assists during the 2021–22 PLK season.

On July 26, 2023, he signed with Zastal Zielona Góra of the Polish Basketball League.

On July 18, 2025, he signed with Patrioti Levice of Slovak Extraliga (basketball) (SLB).

== International career ==
Novak was the member of the Serbia men's national U16 team, which played at the European Championships in Riga. Two years later he played with the U18 team in Samsun, Turkey at the European Championships after which he played at the U20 European Championships in Crete, Greece in 2017 and then in Chemnitz, Germany in 2018.
