= Dejan Srzić =

Serbian basketball coach and player

Personal information
- Born: 28 June 1955 (age 71) Serbia, Yugoslavia
- Listed height: 1.73 m (5 ft 8 in)

Career information
- Playing career: 1974–1976
- Position: Point guard
- Coaching career: 1975–present

Career history

Playing
- 1974–1975: OKK Beograd
- 1975–1976: Ušće

Coaching
- 1975–1977: Ušće
- 1979–1982: Radnički Belgrade (assistant)
- 1982–1983: Varda Višegrad
- 1983–1985: Larisa
- 1985–1988: Aris (assistant)
- 1988–1989: Panionios
- 1989: Partizan
- 1990–1992: Crvena zvezda (assistant)
- 1992–1993: Jugotes TNN Bijelo Polje
- 1993–1994: Niaris Athens
- 1994–1995: Kumanovo
- 1995–1997: Mladost Zemun
- 1997–1998: Kolubara
- 1998–1999: Panathinaikos Limassol
- 1999–2001: Mladost Zemun
- 2001–2002: Elektra
- 2003–2004: Radnički Belgrade
- 2004–2006: Kingtrade Makarska
- 2006–2007: Mavrovo
- 2007–2008: Osijek 2016
- 2008–2009: Vitez
- 2010–2011: Vrijednosnice Osijek Darda
- 2011–2013: Partizan (youth)
- 2019: Jedinstvo Bijelo Polje
Medals
Men's basketball
Assistant Coach for Yugoslavia
Under-19 World Cup
Gold medal – first place	1987 Italy	U19 team
European Championship for Juniors
Gold medal – first place	1988 Yugoslavia	U18 team
Gold medal – first place	1986 Austria	U18 team
Silver medal – second place	1982 Bulgaria	U18 team
Bronze medal – third place	1984 Sweden	U18 team

Dejan Srzić (Serbian Cyrillic: Дејан Срзић; born 28 June 1955), also known by his nickname Susla, is a Serbian professional basketball coach and former player.

== Coaching career ==
During his coaching career, Srzić was a head coach for Varda Višegrad, Larisa, Panionios, Partizan, Jugotes TNN, Kumanovo, Mladost Zemun, Kolubara, Panathinaikos Limassol, Elektra, Radnički Belgrade, Mavrovo, Osijek 2016, Vrijednosnice Osijek Darda. He was an assistant coach to Giannis Ioannidis in Aris.

In March 2019, Srzić was hired as the head coach of Jedinstvo Bijelo Polje for the 2018–19 Montenegrin Super League season.

== National teams coaching career ==
During the 1980s, Srzić was an assistant coach to the Yugoslavia Junior team. With the under-18 national team at the European Championships for Juniors, he won two gold medals (1986 and 1988), a silver medal (1982) and a bronze medal (1984). With the national under-19 team Srzić won the gold medal at the 1987 FIBA Under-19 World Championship in Bormio, Italy.

== Career achievements ==
As assistant coach

- Greek League champion: 3 (with Aris: 1985–86, 1986–87, 1987–88)
- Greek Cup winner: 2 (with Aris: 1986–87, 1987–88)
