= Lazar Kojović =

Serbian-Canadian basketball player

Free agent
- Position: Shooting guard / small forward

Personal information
- Born: September 5, 1994 (age 32) Oakville, Ontario
- Listed height: 1.96 m (6 ft 5 in)
- Listed weight: 84 kg (185 lb)

Career information
- High school: T. A. Blakelock (Oakville, Ontario)
- College: McMaster (2012–2017)
- NBA draft: 2017: undrafted
- Playing career: 2017–present

Career history
- 2017–2018: Spartak Subotica

Lazar Kojović (Serbian Cyrillic: Лазар Којовић; born September 5, 1994) is a Serbian–Canadian professional basketball player, who last played for Spartak Subotica of the Basketball League of Serbia.

== Early life ==
Lazar Kojovic was born September 5, 1994, in Oakville, Ontario, to his parents Aleksandar and Milica Kojovic, who were both born in Serbia. Kojovic played for Oakville Vytis while he was younger, until switching teams to Oakville Venom.

== Early career ==
Kojović played college basketball for the McMaster Marauders of the U Sports men's basketball championship from 2012 to 2017. Over 19 championship games in 2016–17 season, he averaged 8.8 points, 4.4 rebounds and 2.0 assists per game.

== Professional career ==
Prior to 2017–18 season, he signed for the Spartak Subotica from Serbia. He left Spartak after one season.
