= Filip Anđušić =

Montenegrin basketball player

No. 5 – Studentski centar
- Position: Power forward / center
- League: Prva A Liga; ABA League

Personal information
- Born: 22 January 2002 (age 24) Pljevlja, FR Yugoslavia
- Listed height: 2.09 m (6 ft 10 in)
- Listed weight: 108 kg (238 lb)

Career information
- Playing career: 2020–present

Career history
- 2020–2022: Crvena zvezda
- 2020–2021: → Tamiš
- 2021–2022: → Slodes
- 2022–2025: Podgorica
- 2025–present: Studentski centar
Medals
Men's basketball
Representing Montenegro
FIBA U20 European Championship
Bronze medal – third place	2022 Montenegro	Team

Filip Anđušić (Serbian Cyrillic: Филип Анђушић; born 22 January 2002) is a Montenegrin professional basketball player for Studentski centar of the Prva A Liga and the ABA League. Standing at 6 ft 10 in (2.08 m), he plays both power forward and center positions.

== Early life and career ==
Anđušić grew up playing basketball with a local club prior he joined a youth system of a Serbian club Vizura in 2016. Three years later, he joined the Crvena zvezda youth system.

== Professional career ==
On 1 February 2020, Anđušić officially signed a four-year professional contract with Crvena zvezda. Afterwards, he was loaned to Tamiš for the 2020–21 BLS season, and to Slodes for the 2021–22 BLS season.

On 26 July 2022, Anđušić signed for Podgorica.

== National team career ==
In August 2018, Anđušić was a member of the Montenegro under-16 team that finished 14th at the FIBA U16 European Championship in Novi Sad, Serbia. Over seven tournament games, he averaged 10.1 points and 5.6 rebounds per game. In July/August 2019, Anđušić was a member of the Montenegro national under-18 team that finished 12th at the FIBA U18 European Championship in Volos, Greece. Over six tournament games, he averaged 2.5 points, 3.7 rebounds, and one assist per game. In July 2022, Anđušić was a member of the Montenegro under-20 team that won a bronze medal at the FIBA U20 European Championship in Podgorica, Montenegro. Over seven tournament games, he averaged 11 points and 8.7 rebounds per game.
