= Pavel Gromyko =

Russian basketball player

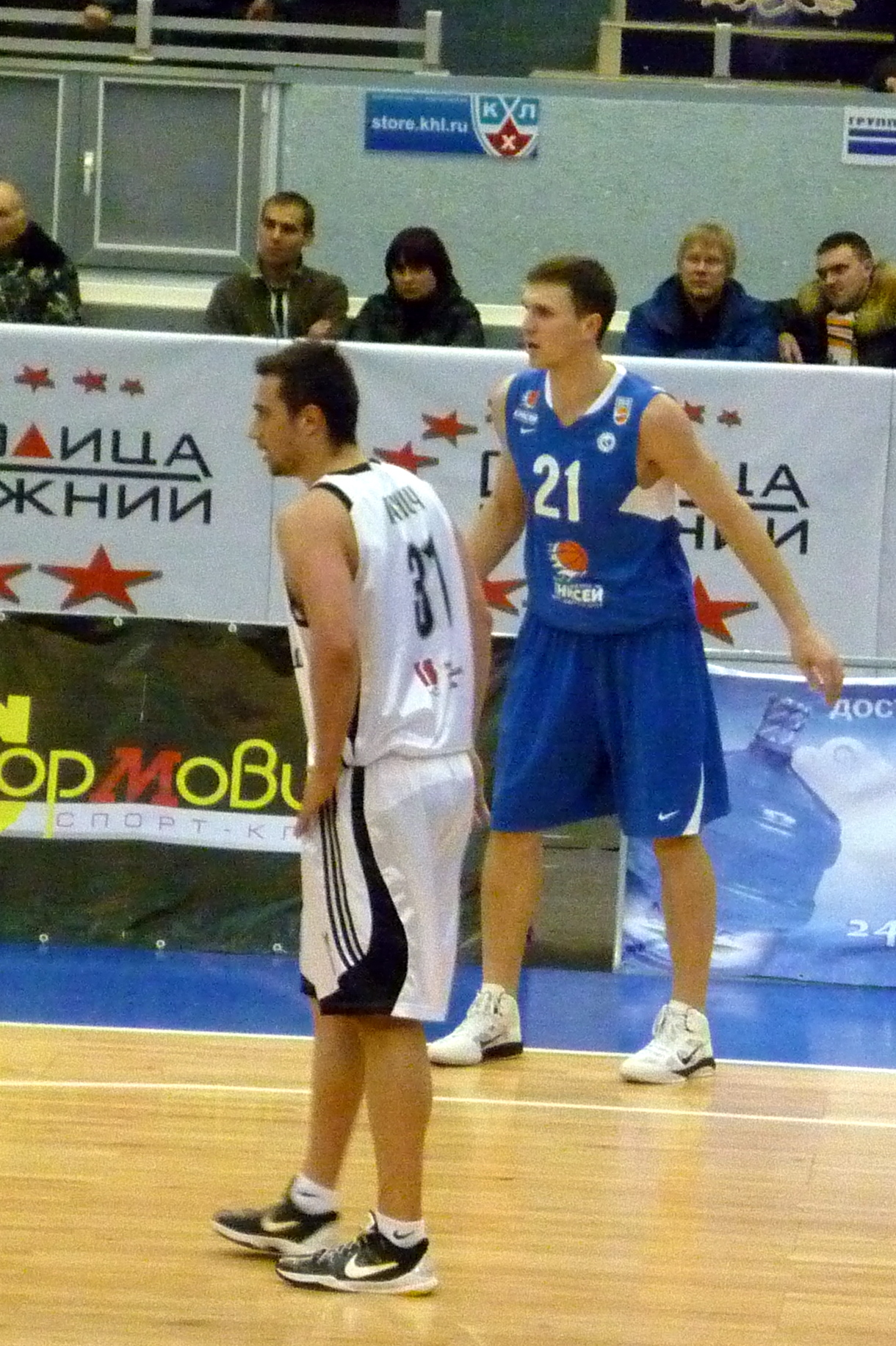
- Pavel Gromyko (blue jersey) in 2010

No. 1 – Ufimets
- Position: Small forward
- League: Russian Superleague 2

Personal information
- Born: May 24, 1989 (age 37) Moscow, Soviet Union
- Listed height: 1.98 m (6 ft 6 in)
- Listed weight: 106 kg (234 lb)

Career information
- NBA draft: 2011: undrafted
- Playing career: 2006–present

Career history
- 2006: Dynamo Saint Petersburg
- 2007–2008: Crvena zvezda
- 2009–2010: Khimki
- 2010–2013: Enisey
- 2013–2014: Spartak Primorye
- 2014–2015: Dynamo Moscow
- 2016–2017: Burevestnik Yaroslavl
- 2017–present: Ufimets Ufa
Medals
Men's basketball
Representing Russia
FIBA Europe Under-16 Championship
Gold medal – first place	2004 Greece	Team

Pavel Sergeevič Gromyko (Russian: Павел Сергеевич Громыко; born May 24, 1989), is a Russian professional basketball player who currently plays for the Ufimets Ufa of the Russian Superleague 2.

== Playing career ==
Gromyko started his career with Dynamo Saint Petersburg. He spent one year playing for Serbian team Crvena zvezda. He also played for domestic teams Khimki, Enisey and Dynamo Moscow.

In 2016, he signed for Yaroslavl-based Burevestnik of the 3rd-tier Russian Superleague 2. In 2017, he joined Ufimets from Ufa.

== International career ==
Gromyko was a member of the Russia U-16 national basketball team that won a silver medal at the 2004 FIBA Europe Under-16 Championship. Over eight tournament games, he averaged 15.2 points, 8.2 rebounds and 0.6 assists per game. He also was a member of the under-16 team that competed at the 2005 FIBA Europe Under-16 Championship. Over eight tournament games, he averaged 23.6 points, 14.5 rebounds and 0.6 assists per game. He also represented Russian U18 team at the 2006 FIBA Europe Under-18 Championship.
