= Luka Barišić =

Croatian basketball player

HKK Široki
- Position: Power Forward
- League: Championship of BiH & ABA 2

Personal information
- Born: January 3, 1998 (age 28) Osijek, Croatia
- Listed height: 6 ft 9 in (2.06 m)
- Listed weight: 240 lb (109 kg)

Career information
- College: Highland Community College (2017–2019); University of Texas at San Antonio (2019–2021); Western Illinois University (2021–2022)
- NBA draft: 2022: undrafted
- Playing career: 2012–present

Career history
- 2012–2014: Vrijednosnice Osijek
- 2014–2017: Cedevita Junior
- 2022: Podgorica
- 2022–2023: Škrljevo
- 2023–2024: Ilirija
- 2024–2025: Široki

Luka Barišić (born January 3, 1998) is a Croatian professional basketball player for HKK Široki of the Championship of BiH and ABA 2. Standing at 2.08 m (6 ft 9 in), he plays as a power forward. He played college basketball for the Highland Cougars, the UTSA Roadrunners, and the Western Illinois Leathernecks.

== Early career ==
Luka was born in Osijek, Croatia, where he also started his basketball career for Vrijednosnice Osijek in the season 2014-2015. For the season 2015–2016, Barišić moved to Cedevita Zagreb. With Barišić Cedevita Zagreb won the 2017–18 U-19 League and participated in Adidas Next Generation Tournament in Belgrade, Serbia.

== College career ==
In 2018–2019, Barišić left for college in the United States. He started his college career at Highland Community College where he won All-American award in the NJCAA. After that, he moved to University of Texas at San Antonio, where he was coached by former NBA player Steve Henson. He graduated with his MBA degree from Western Illinois University, where he earned All-Summit League Honorable Mention and All-Newcomer Team.

== Professional career ==
=== KK Podgorica (2022) ===
He started a professional career in Podgorica in Montenegro for Podgorica. In 2 games for Podgorica, Luka averaged 7.5ppg, 2.5rpg, and 2.0apg in ABA 2 league.

=== KK Škrljevo (2022-2023) ===
In November 2022, Luka signed with Škrljevo until the end of the 2022-2023 season.

=== KD Ilirija (2023-2024) ===
In September 2023, Luka signed with Ilirija until the end of the 2023-2024 season.

=== HKK Široki (2024-2025) ===
In September 2024, Luka signed with Široki until the end of the 2025-2026 season.

== National team career ==
He currently plays for the Croatia men's national basketball team. In 2016, he also represented Croatia at the FIBA U18 European Championship in Samsun, Turkey. His stats at that event were 6 games: 3.3ppg, 2.0rpg, 1.2apg.

== Career statistics ==
Legend
GP	Games played	GS	Games started	MPG	Minutes per game
FG%	Field goal percentage	3P%	3-point field goal percentage	FT%	Free throw percentage
RPG	Rebounds per game	APG	Assists per game	SPG	Steals per game
BPG	Blocks per game	PPG	Points per game	**Bold**	Career high

=== College ===
Year	Team	GP	GS	MPG	FG%	3P%	FT%	RPG	APG	SPG	BPG	PPG
2017–18	Highland CC	28	28	23.2	**.529**	**.396**	.779	4.8	0.9	0.3	0.21	15.1
2018–19	Highland CC	28	28	25.4	.496	.390	.842	**6.5**	**1.8**	**0.5**	0.22	**17.5**
2019–20	UTSA	32	21	16.9	.427	.303	.816	3.1	0.8	**0.5**	0.24	6.6
2020–21	UTSA	14	0	12.0	.384	.300	**.857**	3.3	0.7	0.2	0.21	5.3
2021–22	Western Illinois	**32**	**32**	**27.6**	.324	.263	.794	5.9	1.4	0.3	**0.3**	14.1
Career		134	109	21.02	.448	.331	.817	4.7	1.2	0.36	0.24	11.7
