= Mladen Vujić =

Serbian basketball player

No. 3 – Podgorica
- Position: Center
- League: Prva A Liga; ABA League Second Division

Personal information
- Born: 14 August 1998 (age 28) Belgrade, FR Yugoslavia
- Listed height: 2.05 m (6 ft 9 in)
- Listed weight: 110 kg (243 lb)

Career information
- NBA draft: 2020: undrafted
- Playing career: 2016–present

Career history
- 2016–2018: Žarkovo
- 2018–2021: OKK Beograd
- 2021: Vojvodina
- 2021–2022: Mega Basket
- 2022–present: Podgorica

Mladen Vujić (Serbian Cyrillic: Младен Вујић; born 14 August 1998) is a Serbian professional basketball player for Podgorica of the Prva A Liga and the ABA League Second Division.

== Playing career ==
Vujić played for his hometown teams Žarkovo and OKK Beograd, as well as Novi Sad-based Vojvodina.

On 17 June 2021, Vujić signed a contract with Mega Basket. On 15 June 2022, Vujić signed a contract for Podgorica.
