= Đorđe Milosavljević (basketball) =

Serbian basketball player

No. 11 – Mladost Zemun
- Position: Point guard
- League: Basketball League of Serbia

Personal information
- Born: 31 August 1994 (age 32) Kragujevac, FR Yugoslavia
- Listed height: 1.93 m (6 ft 4 in)
- Listed weight: 83 kg (183 lb)

Career information
- NBA draft: 2016: undrafted
- Playing career: 2010–present

Career history
- 2010–2011: Radnički KG 06
- 2011–2013: Radnički Kragujevac
- 2012–2013: → Velika Plana
- 2013–2015: Velika Plana
- 2017–2018: Radnički Kragujevac
- 2018–2019: Albacete
- 2019–2020: TSU
- 2020: Radnički Kragujevac
- 2020–present: Mladost Zemun

Đorđe Milosavljević (born 31 August 1994) is a Serbian professional basketball player for Mladost Zemun of the Basketball League of Serbia.
