= Nebojša Bogavac =

Serbian basketball player and head coach

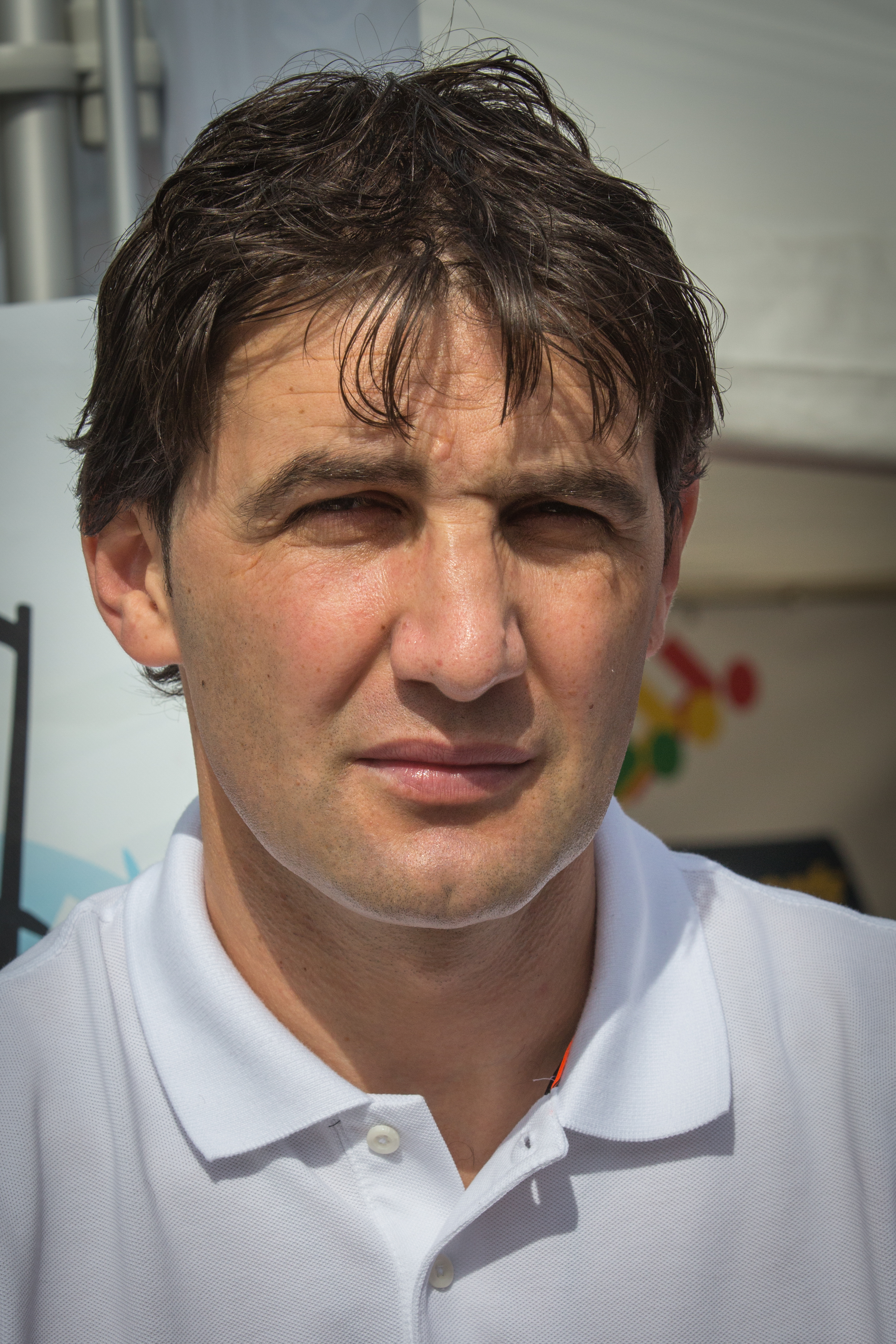

Metropolitans 92
- Title: Assistant coach
- League: LNB Pro A

Personal information
- Born: December 14, 1973 (age 52) Mojkovac, SR Montenegro, Yugoslavia
- Listed height: 1.99 m (6 ft 6 in)
- Listed weight: 96 kg (212 lb)

Career information
- NBA draft: 1995: undrafted
- Playing career: 1997–2010
- Position: Shooting guard / small forward
- Coaching career: 2012–present

Career history

Playing
- 1997–2001: Lovćen
- 2001–2005: Hemofarm
- 2005–2006: Breogán
- 2006–2008: Le Mans
- 2008: Lovćen
- 2008: Mahram Tehran
- 2009: ASVEL Basket
- 2009: Gorštak
- 2009–2010: JDA Dijon
- 2010: ASVEL Basket

Coaching
- 2012: Hemofarm
- 2013–2014, 2017–2020: Strasbourg IG (assistant)
- 2021–2023: Podgorica
- 2023–present: Metropolitans 92 (assistant)

Career highlights
- Adriatic League champion (2005); Adriatic League Final Four MVP (2005); French League champion (2009)

Nebojša Bogavac (Montenegrin Cyrillic: Небојша Богавац; born December 14, 1973) is a Montenegrin professional basketball coach and former player who is the current assistant coach for Metropolitans 92 of the LNB Pro A.

== Professional career ==
Bogavac played four seasons for KK Lovćen in the Yugoslav Basketball League from 1997 to 2001. He then spent next four years with KK Hemofarm between 2001 and 2005. He helped the team to win the Adriatic League title in 2005. Bogavac signed with CB Breogán in Spain for the 2005–05 season. After that, he played two years with Le Mans Sarthe Basket in France. He started the 2008–09 season with KK Lovćen, but left in December for Mahram Tehran BC, for which he played only at the tournament in Dubai later that month. In February 2009, he signed with ASVEL Basket for the rest of the season. In the 2009–10 season, Bogavac represented KK Gorštak and JDA Dijon Basket. In October 2010, he returned to ASVEL, and played there until December.

== National team career ==
Bogavac was a member of the Serbia and Montenegro national team at the EuroBasket 2003 in Sweden. Over four tournament games, he averaged 1.8 points, one rebound, and 0.5 assists per game.

Bogavac was a member of the Montenegro national team at the FIBA EuroBasket 2009 Division B.

== Coaching career ==
On 18 June 2021, Podgorica hired Bogavac as their new head coach.

On July 21, 2023, he signed with Metropolitans 92 of the LNB Pro A.

== Personal life ==
His son, Luka (born 2003), played for Mega Basket before committing to the University of North Carolina Men's Basketball team on May 31st, 2025.
