= ZIKS =

- Interactive map of ZIKS
- Location: Spuž, Montenegro; 42°29′52″N 19°12′42″E
- Status: open
- Security class: mixed
- Capacity: 1,233
- Opened: 1951
- Managed by: Ministry of Justice of Montenegro
- Director: Milan Tomić

Bureau for Execution of Criminal Sanctions (Montenegrin: Zavod za izvršenje krivičnih sankcija, abbreviated as ZIKS) is a Montenegrin governmental department administering the national prison system.

== Organisation ==
ZIKS consists of 4 distinct organizational units, 3 of which make up the Spuž prison complex, 9 kilometres (6 mi) northwest of central Podgorica. The Spuž complex was erected in the 1950s, replacing several smaller prisons within Podgorica city proper. ZIKS and Spuž prison are often used interchangeably.

=== Remand prison ===
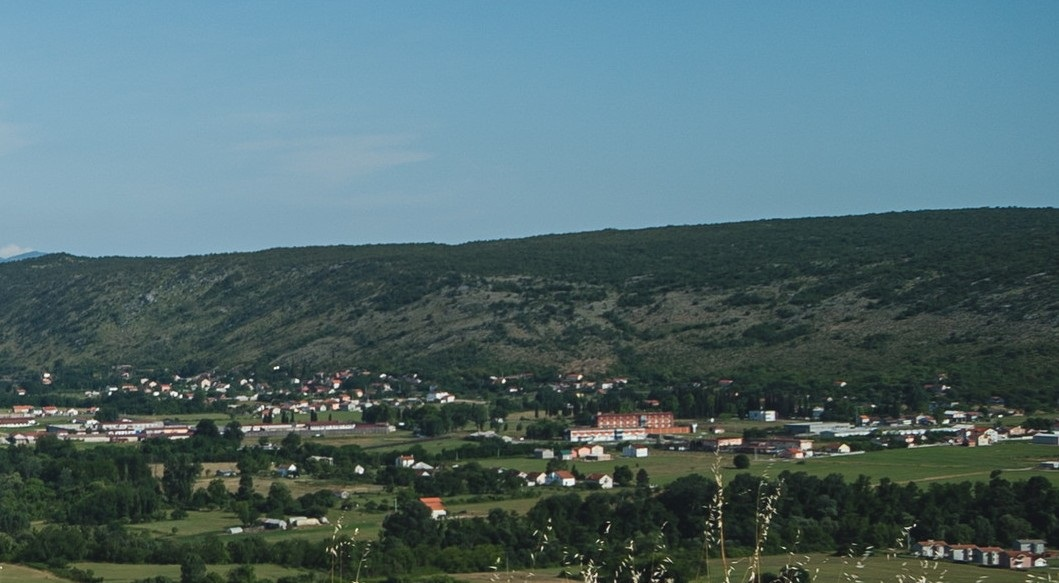
The red 4-storey building is Remand Prison, before this building is located Short Term Prison, Detention and Rehabilitation Centre is at the left side of the picture.

Remand prison (Istražni zatvor) is a pre-trial detention prison, located within the Spuž prison complex. It consists of a single three-floor building and a surrounding yard, encircled with a brick wall. It can house 370 suspects, of which 40 beds are within female ward. Usually, there are around 300 suspects awaiting trial at the prison at any time.

=== Detention and rehabilitation centre Podgorica ===
Detention and rehabilitation centre Podgorica (Kazneno popravni dom Podgorica, abbreviated as KPD Podgorica) is a facility for incarceration of convicted felons, located within the Spuž prison complex. It houses inmates convicted to prison sentences longer than 6 months. It consists of following housing units:

- Closed Section (Zatvoreno odjeljenje) - Medium/maximum security facility, containing a yard with several pavilions, encircled with a high brick wall. Colloquially known as Krug (The circle).
  - Pavilion A - medium security, capacity 80 inmates
  - Pavilion B - medium security, capacity 92 inmates
  - Pavilion C - maximum security, under permanent lockdown, capacity 24 inmates
  - Pavilion D - medium security, capacity 100 inmates
  - Disciplinary unit - a solitary confinement unit, single building with 8 cells
- Semi-open Section (Polu otvoreno odjeljenje, POO) - minimum security facility, capacity 470 inmates. Colloquially known as Ekonomija (The economy).
- Pavilion F - facility housing minors, female prisoners and foreign nationals

The KPD has had a chronic problem with overcrowding, with 20% to 30% more inmates incarcerated than nominal capacity allows.

=== Facility for short term prison sentences ===
Facility for short term prison sentences (Zatvor za kratke kazne, ZKK) is a separate prison unit within Spuž prison complex, housing inmates that are serving prison sentences shorter than 6 months. It is divided into medium and minimum security sections, and has a capacity of 150 inmates. It consists of a single two-floor pavilion and surrounding yard, encircled with a chain-link fence.

=== Bijelo Polje prison ===
Bijelo Polje prison is the only part of ZIKS located outside the Spuž prison complex. The building, erected in 1949, is situated in the urban core of Bijelo Polje, in northern Montenegro. It consists of a prison for convicted felons and a remand prison. Entire facility has a capacity of 110 inmates. It serves as a short term prison sentence facility and a pre-trial detention center. It houses inmates serving longer sentences only when inmates are transferred from Spuž for security reasons, or inmates from northern Montenegro opt to serve there, in order to be closer to their families.
