= Nenad Trajković =

Nenad Trajković may refer to:

- Nenad Trajković (basketball) (born 1961), Serbian basketball coach
- Nenad Trajković (poet) (born 1982), Serbian poet, essayist and literary critic
