= Marko Kljajević =

Montenegrin basketball player

Podgorica
- Position: Small forward
- League: ABA League; Prva A Liga

Personal information
- Born: 4 May 2001 (age 25) Bijelo Polje, Montenegro, Yugoslavia
- Listed height: 2.02 m (6 ft 8 in)
- Listed weight: 95 kg (209 lb)

Career information
- Playing career: 2019–present

Career history
- 2020–2021: Mega Basket
- 2019–2020: →OKK Beograd
- 2021–present: Podgorica

Career highlights
- U19 ABA League champion (2018)
Medals
Men's basketball
Representing Montenegro
FIBA Europe Under-16 Championship
Silver medal – second place	2017 Montenegro	U16 Team

Marko Kljajević (born 4 May 2001) is a Montenegrin professional basketball player for Podgorica of the Prva A Liga and the ABA League Second Division.

== Early career ==
In 2017, Kljajević joined the Mega Bemax youth system. He won the 2018 Junior ABA League with the U19 Mega Bemax team.

== Professional career ==
Prior to the 2019–20 Serbian League season, Kljajević was added to the roster of Mega's affiliate OKK Beograd. During the season, he averaged 5.3 points and 2.4 rebounds in his 22 appearances. In August 2020, he was promoted to the Mega Soccerbet senior team for the 2020–21 ABA season. On 3 October 2020, he made his Mega and Adriatic League debut in a 84–62 win over Igokea, recording 2 points and 3 rebounds.

On 18 June 2021, Kljajević signed a multi-year contract with Podgorica.

== National team career ==
Kljajević was a member of the Montenegro under-16 team that won the silver medal at the 2017 FIBA Europe Under-16 Championship in his home country. Over seven tournament games, he averaged 3.0 points, 0.7 rebounds, and 0.6 assists per game. Kljajević was a member of the Montenegro under-17 team at the 2018 FIBA Under-17 Basketball World Cup in Rosario and Santa Fe, Argentina. Over seven tournament games, he averaged 2.9 points and 2.0 rebounds per game. In the same year, Kljajević was a member of the Montenegro under-18 team at the FIBA U18 European Championship in Latvia. He only appeared in a 76–52 loss to Germany, recording 4 points, 2 rebounds, and 2 assists. Also, he was a member of the U18 Montenegro team at the 2019 FIBA U18 European Championship in Volos, Greece. Over six tournament games, he averaged 7.2 points, 3.8 rebounds, and 1.2 assists per game.
