= KK Podgorica =

Basketball club in Podgorica, Montenegro

Podgorica
- Leagues: Prva A Liga; ABA League
- Founded: 2007; 19 years ago
- History: KK Podgorica (2007–present)
- Arena: Bemax Arena
- Capacity: 2,000
- Location: Podgorica, Montenegro
- Team colors: Light blue and white
- Main sponsor: Bemax
- President: Vladan Ivanović
- General manager: Zoran Vujičić
- Head coach: Nebojša Bogavac
- Website: kk-podgorica.me

Košarkaški klub Podgorica (transl. Podgorica Basketball Club), commonly referred to as KK Podgorica, is a men's professional basketball club based in Podgorica, Montenegro. The club has the same management structure as Budućnost Bemax. They are currently competing in the Montenegrin First League and the ABA League Second Division.

== History ==
The club played the 2011–12 season in the Montenegrin League. In the 2019–20 season, Podgorica won the First B League and got promoted to the First A League for the 2020–21 season. In June 2020, they have received a wild card for the 2020–21 season of the ABA League Second Division.

== Players ==
=== Current roster ===
Note: Flags indicate national team eligibility at FIBA-sanctioned events. Players may hold other non-FIBA nationalities not displayed.

Podgorica roster
Players
Coaches

Pos.	No.	Nat.	Name	Ht.	Age
PG	0	(France)	Beyhurst, Ludovic	1.72 m (5 ft 8 in)	27 – 5 January 1999
C	3	(Serbia)	Vujić, Mladen	2.05 m (6 ft 9 in)	28 – 14 August 1998
G	4	(Montenegro)	Vojinović, Jovan	1.93 m (6 ft 4 in)	27 – 10 November 1998
F/C	5	(Montenegro)	Anđušić, Filip	2.08 m (6 ft 10 in)	24 – 22 January 2002
SG	6	(Montenegro)	Vučeljić, Zoran	1.97 m (6 ft 6 in)	23 – 9 September 2003
SF	7	(Montenegro)	Kljajević, Marko	2.02 m (6 ft 8 in)	25 – 4 May 2001
SG	8	(Montenegro)	Radunović, Marko	2.00 m (6 ft 7 in)	20 – 11 April 2006
G	9	(Montenegro)	Čarapić, Ognjen	1.95 m (6 ft 5 in)	28 – 1 September 1998
SF	10	(Montenegro)	Vujisić, Viktor	2.01 m (6 ft 7 in)	25 – 6 March 2001
SF	13	(Montenegro)	Brnović, Danilo	2.00 m (6 ft 7 in)	26 – 10 August 2000
SF	16	(Montenegro)	Kaluđerović, Vladan	1.98 m (6 ft 6 in)	28 – 4 March 1998
PG	17	(Switzerland)	Fofana, Selim	1.93 m (6 ft 4 in)	27 – 8 July 1999
PF	22	(Montenegro)	Vukčević, Lazar	2.03 m (6 ft 8 in)	23 – 12 March 2003
PF	35	(Montenegro)	Lacmanović, Danilo	2.05 m (6 ft 9 in)	22 – 18 February 2004
PF	44	(Croatia)	Barišić, Luka	2.08 m (6 ft 10 in)	28 – 3 January 1998
PG	77	(Montenegro)	Hot, Amar	1.83 m (6 ft 0 in)	22 – 19 July 2004
G	–	(Montenegro)	Bogavac, Luka	1.95 m (6 ft 5 in)	22 – 20 September 2003

Head coach

- (Montenegro) Nebojša Bogavac

Assistant coach(es)

- (Montenegro) Vladimir Vuković
- (Serbia) Branko Milisavljević
- (Montenegro) Dragan Radović
- (Montenegro) Nikola Bulatović

Legend

- (C) Team captain
- Injured

- Roster
Updated: December 9, 2022

== Head coaches ==
- (Montenegro) Petar Mijović (2011–2012)
- (Montenegro) Vladan Radović (2019–2020)
- (Montenegro) Zoran Kašćelan (2020–2021)
- (Montenegro) Nebojša Bogavac (2021–present)

== Notable players ==
Note: Flags indicate national team eligibility at FIBA-sanctioned events. Players may hold other non-FIBA nationalities not displayed.

Criteria

To appear in this section a player must have either:

- Set a club record or won an individual award while at the club
- Played at least one official international match for their national team at any time
- Played at least one official NBA match at any time.

- (Kosovo) (Montenegro) Mikaile Tmušić
- (Montenegro) Marko Mugoša
- (Montenegro) Nikola Žižić
