= Ivan Karačić (basketball) =

Croatian basketball player

No. 21 – BC Cherno More
- Positions: Power forward, Center
- League: NBL

Personal information
- Born: 20 February 1996 (age 30)
- Listed height: 2.04 m (6 ft 8 in)
- Listed weight: 204 lb (93 kg)

Career information
- Playing career: 2012–present

Career history
- 2012–2020: HKK Široki
- 2020: Dąbrowa Górnicza
- 2020–2021: MZT Skopje
- 2021: Niners Chemnitz
- 2022: Brussels Basketball
- 2022: Niners Chemnitz
- 2022–2023: PS Karlsruhe Lions
- 2023–2026: Cedevita Junior
- 2026–present: Cherno More Ticha

Career highlights
- 2× Impact Player of the Game (ProA, 2022–23)

Ivan Karačić (born 20 February 1996) is a Croatian professional basketball player who plays as a power forward and a center for Cherno More Ticha in the National Basketball League.

== Professional career ==
In 2021, he played for Niners Chemnitz in Germany and Phoenix Brussels in Belgium.

In 2022, he joined the PS Karlsruhe Lions of the German second-tier ProA league, where his signing was reported as a key addition for the team due to his versatility and international experience. Karačić was named Impact Player of the Game twice during the 2022–23 season.

In July 2023, Karačić signed with KK Cedevita Junior in Croatia.

Он 21 January 2026 Karačić signed with Bulgarian club Cherno More Ticha.

== International career ==
Karačić represented Croatia's U16, U18, and U20 national teams in international FIBA youth competitions.
