= Ognjen Čarapić =

Montenegrin basketball player

No. 19 – Podgorica
- Position: Guard
- League: Prva A Liga; ABA League

Personal information
- Born: September 1, 1998 (age 28) Bar, Montenegro, FR Yugoslavia
- Listed height: 1.93 m (6 ft 4 in)
- Listed weight: 86 kg (190 lb)

Career information
- NBA draft: 2020: undrafted
- Playing career: 2014–present

Career history
- 2014–2016: Budućnost VOLI
- 2016–2019: Mega Leks
- 2019–2020: JL Bourg
- 2020–2021: FMP
- 2021–present: Podgorica

Career highlights
- Montenegrin League (2015); Montenegrin Cup (2016)

Ognjen Čarapić (Serbian Cyrillic: Огњен Чарапић, born 1 September 1998) is a Montenegrin professional basketball player for Podgorica of the Montenegrin First League and the ABA League Second Division.

== Playing career ==
Čarapić started practicing basketball at his hometown's club Mornar before moving to Podgorica's Montenegrin powerhouse Budućnost VOLI in 2012. In April 2014, he participated at the Jordan Brand Classic event in New York.

In September 2020, Čarapić signed with the Serbian club FMP of the ABA League. In January 2021, he parted ways with FMP to sign for Podgorica.
