= Stephane Gombauld =

French basketball player

Stéphane Gombauld
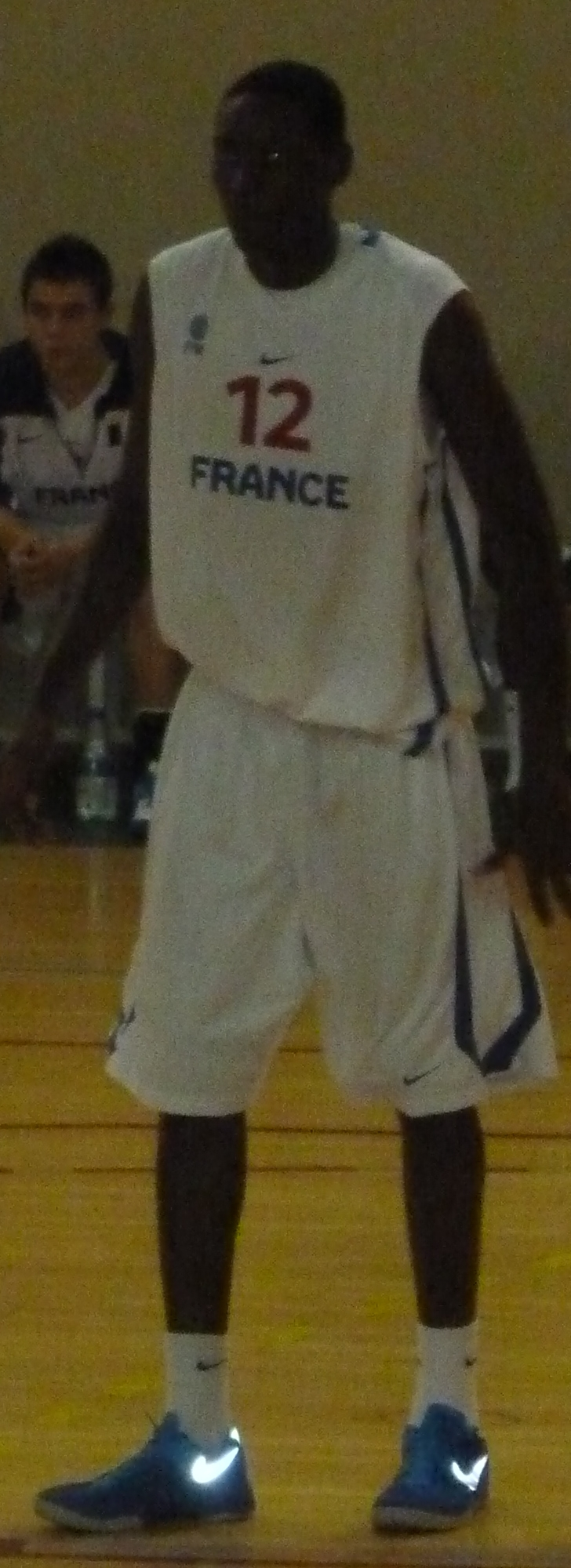
- Stephane Gombauld

No. 13 – SLUC Nancy Basket
- Position: Power forward
- League: LNB Pro A

Personal information
- Born: 5 March 1997 (age 29) Saint-Claude, Guadeloupe, France
- Listed height: 2.05 m (6 ft 9 in)
- Listed weight: 103 kg (227 lb)

Career information
- High school: INSEP (Paris, France)
- NBA draft: 2019: undrafted
- Playing career: 2015–present

Career history
- 2015–2017: ASVEL Lyon-Villeurbanne
- 2016–2017: →Saint-Chamond
- 2017–2018: Lille
- 2018–2019: Chartres
- 2019–2020: ADA Blois
- 2020–2021: Mladost Zemun
- 2021–2023: SLUC Nancy
- 2023–2024: Dinamo Sassari
- 2024–2025: UnaHotels Reggio Emilia
- 2025–present: SLUC Nancy Basket

Career highlights
- French League champion (2016)
Medals
Men's basketball
Representing France
FIBA Europe Under-20 Championship
Bronze medal – third place	2017 Greece	U20 Team
FIBA Europe Under-16 Championship
Silver medal – second place	2012 Lithuania	U16 Team

Stéphane Patrick Gombauld (born 5 March 1997) is a French professional basketball player for SLUC Nancy Basket of the LNB Pro A.

== Professional career ==
In September 2020, Gombauld signed for Mladost Zemun of the Adriatic League and the SLUC Nancy.

On July 9, 2023, he signed with Dinamo Sassari of the Italian Lega Basket Serie A (LBA).

On July 27, 2024, he signed with Pallacanestro Reggiana of the Italian Lega Basket Serie A (LBA).

On June 26, 2025, he signed with SLUC Nancy Basket of the LNB Pro A.

== National team career ==
Gombauld was a member of the France national under-16 team that won the silver medal at the 2012 FIBA Europe Under-16 Championship in Lithuania. Over nine tournament games, he averaged 4.2 points and 3.7 rebounds per game. Also, he was a team member at the 2013 FIBA Europe Under-16 Championship in Kyev, Ukraine. Over nine tournament games, he averaged 16.0 points and 8.8 rebounds per game.

Gombauld was a member of the U17 France national team at the 2014 FIBA Under-17 World Championship in Dubai, the United Arab Emirates. Over seven tournament games, he averaged 15.4 points and 10.3 rebounds per game.

Gombauld was a member of the U18 France national team at the 2015 FIBA Europe Under-18 Championship in Volos, Greece. Over nine tournament games, he averaged 11.4 points and 7.7 rebounds per game.

Gombauld was a member of the France national under-20 team that won the bronze medal at the 2017 FIBA U20 European Championship on the island of Crete in Greece. Over six tournament games, he averaged 3.0 points and 5.0 rebounds per game.
