= Dragan Radović (basketball) =

Montenegrin basketball player and coach

Podgorica
- Positions: Assistant coach Youth system coordinator
- League: Prva A Liga; ABA League Second Division

Personal information
- Born: 10 December 1976 (age 49) Cetinje, SR Montenegro, SFR Yugoslavia

Career information
- NBA draft: 1998: undrafted
- Playing career: 1993–2004
- Coaching career: 2003–present

Career history

Playing
- 1993–2004: Lovćen 1947

Coaching
- 2003–2005: Lovćen 1947 (assistant)
- 2005–2007: Lovćen 1947
- 2007–2009: Ulcinj
- 2010–2011: Jedinstvo
- 2011–2014: Lovćen 1947
- 2014–2016: Teodo Tivat
- 2016–2017: Bashkimi Prizren
- 2017–2018: Lovćen 1947
- 2018: Bashkimi Prizren
- 2018–2021: Phoenix Galați
- 2021–present: Podgorica (assistant)

Dragan Radović (Serbian Cyrillic: Драган Радовић; born 12 December 1976), also known by his nickname Prle, is a Montenegrin basketball coach and former player. He currently serves both as an assistant coach and youth system coordinator for Podgorica of the Prva A Liga and the ABA League Second Division.

== Coaching career ==
Radović started his coaching career in his hometown team Lovćen 1947 in 2003 as an assistant coach. In 2005, he became a head coach and led the Lovćen for two seasons. Later he also coached Lovćen 1947 from 2011 to 2014. Also, he coached other teams from Montenegrin Basketball League such as Ulcinj, Jedinstvo and Teodo Tivat. Prior to 2016–17 season, he was hired to be the head coach of the Bashkimi Prizren in the Kosovo Superleague and the BIBL.

On 14 July 2017, Radović signed for his third term as head coach for the Lovćen 1947. On February 15, 2018, he parted ways with Lovćen.

In July 2021, Montenegrin team Podgorica named him their new assistant coach and youth system coordinator.

=== National team ===
Radović was a head coach for the Montenegro men's national under-18 basketball team from 2012 to 2015. He won a gold medal at 2013 FIBA Europe Under-18 Championship Division B.

== Career achievements ==
- 2013 FIBA Europe Under-18 Championship Division B: Gold
