= Velimir Radinović =

Canadian-Serbian basketball player

Personal information
- Born: January 17, 1981 (age 45) Oakville, Ontario
- Listed height: 2.12 m (6 ft 11 in)
- Listed weight: 122 kg (269 lb)

Career information
- College: Ohio State (2000–2004)
- NBA draft: 2004: undrafted
- Playing career: 2004–2011
- Position: Center

Career history
- 2004–2005: Reflex Železnik
- 2006–2007: Hemofarm
- 2007–2008: Stade Clermontois
- 2008–2009: Iraklis Thessaloniki
- 2010–2011: Mitteldeutscher
- 2011: Walter Tigers Tübingen

Career highlights
- Serbian Cup winner (2005)

Velimir Radinović (born January 17, 1981) is a Canadian-Serbian former professional basketball player. He is a 2.12 center.
