= Jovan Vojinović =

Montenegrin basketball player

No. 4 – Podgorica
- Position: Shooting guard / point guard
- League: Montenegrin Basketball League

Personal information
- Born: 10 November 1998 (age 28) Nikšić, Montenegro, FR Yugoslavia
- Listed height: 1.93 m (6 ft 4 in)
- Listed weight: 90 kg (198 lb)

Career information
- NBA draft: 2020: undrafted
- Playing career: 2016–present

Career history
- 2016–2018: Mega Basket
- 2016–2017: → Smederevo 1953
- 2017–2018: → Beovuk 72
- 2018–2019: FMP
- 2019–2020: Metalac
- 2020–2021: Sloboda Užice
- 2021–2022: Sutjeska
- 2022–present: Podgorica
Medals
Men's basketball
Representing Montenegro
FIBA Europe Under-18 Championship Division B
Gold medal – first place	2018 Macedonia	U18 Team

Jovan Vojinović (Serbian Cyrillic: Јован Војиновић, born 10 November 1998) is a Montenegrin professional basketball player Podgorica of the Montenegrin First League and the ABA League Second Division.

== Professional career ==
Vojinović played the Euroleague Next Generation Tournaments for the Mega Leks U18 (2014–2016).

In 2016, Vojinović joined Smederevo 1953 for the 2016–17 season. During the 2017–18 season he played for Beovuk 72. In summer 2018, he joined FMP.

In August 2020, Vojinović signed for Sloboda Užice.

== National team career ==
Vojinović was a member of the Montenegro under-18 team that won the gold medal at the 2016 FIBA Europe Under-18 Championship Division B in the Republic of Macedonia.

He was a member of the Montenegro under-20 team that competed at the 2017 FIBA Europe Under-20 Championship in Greece.
