= Luka Bogavac =

Montenegrin basketball player (born 2003)

No. 44 – Oklahoma State Cowboys
- Position: Shooting guard / point guard
- Conference: Big 12 Conference

Personal information
- Born: 20 September 2003 (age 23) Mojkovac, Serbia and Montenegro
- Listed height: 6 ft 6 in (1.98 m)
- Listed weight: 215 lb (98 kg)

Career information
- College: North Carolina (2025–2026); Oklahoma State (2026–present)
- Playing career: 2021–2025

Career history
- 2021–2023: Mega Basket
- 2021–2022: →OKK Beograd
- 2023–2025: SC Derby

Career highlights
- Montenegrin Cup winner (2024); Junior ABA League champion (2022)
Medals
Men's basketball
Representing Montenegro
FIBA U20 European Championship
| Bronze medal – third place | 2022 Montenegro | Team |

Luka Bogavac (born 20 September 2003) is a Montenegrin college basketball player for the Oklahoma State Cowboys of the Big 12 Conference. He previously played for the North Carolina Tar Heels. Prior to college, Bogavac played professionally for SC Derby of the ABA League and Prva A Liga. Standing at 6 ft 6 in (1.98 m) and weighing 215 pounds (98 kg), he plays both shooting guard and point guard positions.

== Early life and career ==
Bogavac grew up with the SIG Strasbourg youth system where his father Nebojša Bogavac was an assistant coach. He joined the Mega Basket youth system in May 2021. At the 2020–21 Euroleague Basketball Next Generation Tournament, he averaged 14.7 points, 5.3 rebounds, and 2 assists per game.

== Professional career ==
On 23 September 2021, Bogavac officially signed his first professional contract with Mega Basket. Also, he joined OKK Beograd on a two-way contract for the 2021–22 KLS season. Bogavac made his senior debut in the ABA League for Mega Basket on 26 September 2021 in a 101–68 win over SC Derby, making 6 points and a rebound in under 5 minutes of playing time.

== College career ==
Following the 2024–25 seasons, Bogavac decided to play college basketball in the United States, ultimately choosing the North Carolina Tar Heels, citing the program's rich tradition as a primary reason.

== National team career ==
Bogavac was a member of the Montenegro U16 national team that participated at the 2019 FIBA U16 European Championship Division B in Podgorica, Montenegro. Over eight tournament games, he averaged 9.3 points, 1.9 rebounds, and one assist per game.

In July 2022, Bogavac was a member of the Montenegro under-20 team that won a bronze medal at the FIBA U20 European Championship in Podgorica, Montenegro. Over seven tournament games, he averaged 3.7 points, 2.7 rebounds, and 2.9 assists per game.
