= Trey Drechsel =

American basketball player (born 1996)

No. 3 – Maroussi
- Position: Shooting guard / small forward
- League: GBL

Personal information
- Born: July 27, 1996 (age 30) Woodinville, Washington, U.S.
- Listed height: 6 ft 6 in (1.98 m)
- Listed weight: 205 lb (93 kg)

Career information
- High school: Cedar Park Christian (Bothell, Washington)
- College: Western Washington (2014–2018); Grand Canyon (2018–2019)
- NBA draft: 2019: undrafted
- Playing career: 2019–present

Career history
- 2019–2020: Mladost Zemun
- 2020–2022: Partizan Belgrade
- 2020–2021: →Mladost Zemun
- 2021–2022: →Stal Ostrów Wielkopolski
- 2022–2023: Baskets Oldenburg
- 2023–2025: Benfica
- 2025: Lietkabelis Panevėžys
- 2026: Diablos Rojos del México
- 2026–present: Maroussi

Career highlights
- 2× Portuguese League champion (2024, 2025); Portuguese League Cup winner (2024); Portuguese Super Cup winner (2023); Polish Cup winner (2022); First-team All-GNAC (2018)

Thomas Bruce "Trey" Drechsel III (born July 27, 1996) is an American professional basketball player for the Maroussi of the Greek Basketball League (GBL). He played college basketball for the Western Washington Vikings and the Grand Canyon Antelopes.

== Early career ==
Drechsel attended Cedar Park Christian High School in Bothell, Washington.

Drechsel played four seasons at Western Washington in Bellingham, Washington, from 2014 to 2018. In the 2017–18 season, he was named to the All-GNAC First Team in 2018.

In 2018, Drechsel moved to Grand Canyon for his senior season. He started 25 games and averaged 8.1 points and 5.8 rebounds per game.

== Professional career ==
On July 5, 2020, Drechsel signed his first professional contract, a three-year deal with Partizan Belgrade of the Adriatic League. On July 31, he was loaned to Mladost Zemun of the Basketball League of Serbia. His loan ended in May 2021. He parted ways with Partizan in August 2021.

On August 30, 2021, Drechsel signed for Stal Ostrów Wielkopolski.

On June 13, 2022, he has signed with Baskets Oldenburg of the Basketball Bundesliga.

On July 17, 2025, Drechsel signed with Lietkabelis Panevėžys of the Lithuanian Basketball League (LKL) and the Eurocup.

On October 29, 2026, he signed with Maroussi of the Greek Basketball League (GBL).

== Personal life ==
Outside of basketball, Drechsel has a YouTube channel, where he uploads mentoring videos and videos of himself vlogging.
