= KK Mladost Zemun =

Basketball club in Zemun, Serbia

Mladost MaxBet
- Leagues: Basketball League of Serbia
- Founded: January 1954; 72 years ago
- History: KK Mladost (1954–present)
- Arena: Master Sport Center
- Capacity: 750
- Location: Zemun, Belgrade, Serbia
- Team colors: Blue and White
- Main sponsor: MaxBet
- Head coach: Marko Dimitrijević
- Affiliations: Partizan (2019–2021); Borac Zemun (2009–2014)
- Championships: 1 Serbian 2nd League
- Website: kkmladost.org.rs
| Home | Away |

Alternate logo

Košarkaški klub Mladost (Serbian Cyrillic: Кошаркашки клуб Младост), commonly referred to as KK Mladost Zemun or as Mladost Maxbet due to sponsorship reasons, is a men's professional basketball club based in Zemun, near Belgrade, Serbia. They are currently competing in the Basketball League of Serbia.

== Sponsorship naming ==
KK Mladost has had several denominations through the years due to its sponsorship:

- Mladost Srbos: 1994–1995
- Mladost Admiral: 2016–2017
- Mladost Maxbet: 2021–present

== Players ==
=== Current roster ===
Note: Flags indicate national team eligibility at FIBA-sanctioned events. Players may hold other non-FIBA nationalities not displayed.

Mladost MaxBet roster
Players
Coaches

| Pos. | No. | Nat. | Name | Ht. | Age |
|---|---|---|---|---|---|
| PG | 3 | (Slovenia) | Klavžar, Nejc | 1.87 m (6 ft 2 in) | 26 – 21 March 1999 |
| PG | 6 | (Serbia) | Milosavljević, Đorđe | 1.83 m (6 ft 0 in) | 31 – 31 August 1994 |
| F | 7 | (Serbia) | Belić, Matija | 2.00 m (6 ft 7 in) | 22 – 16 May 2003 |
| SG | 9 | (Serbia) | Milenković, Marko (C) | 2.00 m (6 ft 7 in) | 26 – 6 May 1999 |
| PF | 10 | (Serbia) | Gavrilović, Strahinja | 2.06 m (6 ft 9 in) | 32 – 5 May 1993 |
| C | 12 | (Republic of the Congo) | Oyona Ibandzo, David | 2.10 m (6 ft 11 in) | 21 – 8 February 2004 |
| SF | 13 | (Serbia) | Kovačević, Nikola | 2.02 m (6 ft 8 in) | 26 – 12 August 1999 |
| F/C | 14 | (Serbia) | Bojić, Andrija | 2.08 m (6 ft 10 in) | 32 – 28 May 1993 |
| F/C | 15 | (Serbia) | Bjeličić, Kosta | 2.05 m (6 ft 9 in) | 20 – 5 July 2005 |
| PF | 34 | (United States) | Carlson, Cody | 2.06 m (6 ft 9 in) | 27 – 17 November 1998 |
| SF | 35 | (Serbia) | Živojinović, Petar | 1.99 m (6 ft 6 in) | 23 – 29 June 2002 |
| PF | 38 | (The Gambia) | Sarr, Ousainou | 2.10 m (6 ft 11 in) | 23 – 6 June 2002 |
| G | | (United States) | Armstrong, Terry | 1.97 m (6 ft 6 in) | 25 – 16 July 2000 |
| PG | | (United States) | Davis, Jon | 1.88 m (6 ft 2 in) | 29 – 8 November 1996 |
| SF | | (Serbia) | Radovanović, Nikola (L) | 2.04 m (6 ft 8 in) | 22 – 13 March 2003 |

Head coach

- (Serbia) Marko Dimitrijević

Assistant coach(es)

- (Serbia) Predrag Savić
- (Serbia) Ljubomir Milentijev

Legend

- (C) Team captain
- (L) On loan
- (TW) Two-way affiliate player
- Injured

- Roster
Updated: June 13, 2022

== Head coaches ==
- (Socialist Federal Republic of Yugoslavia) Miomir Lilić (1974–1975)
- (Socialist Federal Republic of Yugoslavia) Duško Vujošević (1984–1985)
- (Socialist Federal Republic of Yugoslavia) Petar Rodić (1987–1988)
- (Socialist Federal Republic of Yugoslavia) Zoran Prelević (1988–1989)
- (Serbia and Montenegro) Jovica Antonić (1990–1994)
- (Serbia and Montenegro) Dejan Srzić (1995–1997)
- (Serbia and Montenegro) Dejan Srzić (1999–2001)
- (Serbia and Montenegro) Dragan Nikolić (2005–2006)
- (Serbia) Zoran Višić (2008–2009)
- (Serbia) Dragan Nikolić (2014–2016)
- (Serbia) Lazar Spasić (2016–2017)
- (Serbia) Branko Maksimović (2017–2018)
- (Serbia) Marko Barać (2018–2019)
- (Serbia) Dragan Jakovljević (2019–2024)
- (Serbia) Marko Dimitrijević (2024–present)

== Trophies and awards ==
=== Trophies ===
- Second League of Serbia (2nd-tier)
  - Winner (1): 2014–15

== Notable players ==
Note: Flags indicate national team eligibility at FIBA-sanctioned events. Players may hold other non-FIBA nationalities not displayed.

Criteria

To appear in this section a player must have either:

- Set a club record or won an individual award while at the club
- Played at least one official international match for their national team at any time
- Played at least one official NBA match at any time.

- (Serbia) Andrija Bojić
- (Serbia) Vuk Malidžan
- (Serbia) Stefan Pot
- (Serbia) Uroš Trifunović
- (Bosnia and Herzegovina) Aleksej Nešović
- (China) Zhao Xuxin
- (Montenegro) Boris Bakić
- (United States) Trey Drechsel

== See also ==
- KK Partizan
- KK Zemun
