= List of 2019–20 EuroLeague transactions =

This is a list of all personnel changes for the 2019 EuroLeague off-season and 2019–20 EuroLeague season.

== Retirements ==
The following players who played in the 2018–19 Euroleague, and played more than three EuroLeague seasons, retired.

Date	Name	EuroLeague Team(s) and played (years)	Age	Notes	Ref.
July 8	(Lithuania) Antanas Kavaliauskas	(Lithuania) Žalgiris (2016-2019)	34		

== Managerial changes ==
Team	Outgoing manager	Manner of departure	Date of vacancy	Position in table	Replaced with	Date of appointment
(Italy) A|X Armani Exchange Milan	(Italy) Simone Pianigiani	Sacked	11 June 2019	Pre-season	(Italy) Ettore Messina	11 June 2019
(Greece) Panathinaikos OPAP	(United States) Rick Pitino	Resigned	21 June 2019	Pre-season	(Greece) Argyris Pedoulakis	21 June 2019
(Greece) Olympiacos	(Israel) David Blatt	Mutual consent	6 October 2019	16th (0–1)	(Lithuania) Kęstutis Kemzūra	20 October 2019
(Serbia) Crvena zvezda mts	(Serbia) (Greece) Milan Tomić	Resigned	22 October 2019	9th (1–2)	(Serbia) Andrija Gavrilović (interim)	22 October 2019
(Greece) Panathinaikos OPAP	(Greece) Argyris Pedoulakis	Sacked	15 November 2019	9th (4–4)	(Greece) Georgios Vovoras (interim)	15 November 2019
(Serbia) Crvena zvezda mts	(Serbia) Andrija Gavrilović	End of caretaker spell	23 November 2019	15th (3–7)	(Serbia) (Greece) Dragan Šakota	23 November 2019
(Greece) Panathinaikos OPAP	(Greece) Georgios Vovoras	End of caretaker spell	26 November 2019	7th (6–4)	(United States) Rick Pitino	26 November 2019
(Spain) Kirolbet Baskonia	(Croatia) Velimir Perasović	Mutual consent	20 December 2019	13th (6–9)	(Montenegro) Duško Ivanović	
(Germany) Bayern Munich	(Montenegro) Dejan Radonjić	Sacked	7 January 2020	15th (6–11)	(Serbia) Oliver Kostić	7 January 2020

== Player movements ==
=== Between two EuroLeague teams ===
Date	Player	From	To	Contract years	Ref.
June 17	(Lithuania) Lukas Lekavičius	(Greece) Panathinaikos	(Lithuania) Žalgiris	1+1	
June 23	(United States) Nate Wolters	(Lithuania) Žalgiris	(Israel) Maccabi Tel Aviv	2	
June 24	(Russia) Andrey Zubkov	(Russia) Khimki	(Russia) Zenit	3	
June 25	(Russia) Evgeny Valiev	(Russia) Zenit	(Russia) Khimki	2	
June 27	(United States) Derrick Brown	(Turkey) Anadolu Efes	(Serbia) Crvena zvezda	1	
June 27	(Latvia) Jānis Timma	(Greece) Olympiacos	(Russia) Khimki	2	
July 1	(Russia) Sergey Karasev	(Russia) Zenit	(Russia) Khimki	2	
July 2	(Australia) Brock Motum	(Turkey) Anadolu Efes	(Spain) Valencia	2	
July 2	(Germany) Johannes Voigtmann	(Spain) Baskonia	(Russia) CSKA Moscow	2	
July 3	(United States) Cory Higgins	(Russia) CSKA Moscow	(Spain) Barcelona	3	
July 3	(United States) Darrun Hilliard	(Spain) Baskonia	(Russia) CSKA Moscow	1	
July 3	(Serbia) Ognjen Kuzmić	(Spain) Real Madrid	(Serbia) Crvena zvezda	2	
July 4	(United States) Brandon Davies	(Lithuania) Žalgiris	(Spain) Barcelona	2	
July 4	(Russia) Andrei Desiatnikov	(Russia) Zenit	(Russia) Khimki	2	
July 5	(Serbia) Charles Jenkins	(Russia) Khimki	(Serbia) Crvena zvezda	2	
July 6	(France) Nando de Colo	(Russia) CSKA Moscow	(Turkey) Fenerbahçe	2	
July 8	(United States) James Gist	(Greece) Panathinaikos	(Serbia) Crvena zvezda	2	
July 8	(United States) Alec Peters	(Russia) CSKA Moscow	(Turkey) Anadolu Efes	1	
July 8	(Latvia) Jānis Strēlnieks	(Greece) Olympiacos	(Russia) CSKA Moscow	2	
July 12	(France) Antoine Diot	(Spain) Valencia	(France) ASVEL	3	
July 12	(France) Léo Westermann	(Lithuania) Žalgiris	(Turkey) Fenerbahçe	2	
July 14	(United States) Aaron White	(Lithuania) Žalgiris	(Italy) AX Olimpia Milan	2	
July 15	(United States) Jordan Mickey	(Russia) Khimki	(Spain) Real Madrid	2	
July 16	(United States) Devin Booker	(Germany) Bayern Munich	(Russia) Khimki	1	
July 16	(United States) Othello Hunter	(Russia) CSKA Moscow	(Israel) Maccabi Tel Aviv	1+1	
July 17	(Serbia) Stefan Jović	(Germany) Bayern Munich	(Russia) Khimki	2	
July 18	(United States) Derrick Williams	(Germany) Bayern Munich	(Turkey) Fenerbahçe	1	
July 23	(Lithuania) Mindaugas Kuzminskas	(Italy) AX Olimpia Milan	(Greece) Olympiacos	2	
July 25	(Tunisia) Michael Roll	(Israel) Maccabi Tel Aviv	(Italy) AX Olimpia Milan	2	
July 26	(Mexico) Gustavo Ayón	(Spain) Real Madrid	(Russia) Zenit	1	
July 27	(United States) Zach LeDay	(Greece) Olympiacos	(Lithuania) Žalgiris	1+1	
July 30	(Spain) Sergio Rodríguez	(Russia) CSKA Moscow	(Italy) AX Olimpia Milan	3	
August 12	(United States) Mike James	(Italy) AX Olimpia Milan	(Russia) CSKA Moscow	1	
September 10	(United States) Chris Singleton	(Spain) Barcelona	(Turkey) Anadolu Efes	1	
December 25	(Serbia) Vladimir Štimac	(Turkey) Fenerbahçe	(Serbia) Crvena zvezda	1	
December 27	(United States) Kevin Punter	(Greece) Olympiacos	(Serbia) Crvena zvezda	1	

=== To a EuroLeague team ===
Date	Player	From	To	Contract years	Ref.
May 20	(Australia) Jock Landale	(Serbia) Partizan	(Lithuania) Žalgiris	1	
June 12	(United States) Nigel Hayes	(Turkey) Galatasaray	(Lithuania) Žalgiris	1+1	
June 17	(France) Andrew Albicy	(Spain) MoraBanc Andorra	(Russia) Zenit	1	
June 19	(Bosnia and Herzegovina) Alex Renfroe	(Serbia) Partizan	(Russia) Zenit	1	
June 24	(Turkey) Tolga Geçim	(Turkey) Banvit	(Turkey) Anadolu Efes	1+1	
June 26	(Russia) Dmitri Khvostov	(Russia) Lokomotiv Kuban	(Russia) Zenit	3	
June 28	(France) Edwin Jackson	(Montenegro) Budućnost	(France) ASVEL	4	
June 28	(United States) Kevin Punter	(Italy) Virtus Bologna	(Greece) Olympiacos	2	
July 1	(Greece) Antonis Koniaris	(Greece) PAOK	(Greece) Olympiacos	2	
July 1	(Montenegro) Tyrese Rice	(Germany) Brose Bamberg	(Greece) Panathinaikos	1	
July 2	(United States) Jordan Taylor	(France) Limoges	(France) ASVEL	1	
July 3	(Belgium) Ismaël Bako	(Belgium) Antwerp Giants	(France) ASVEL	2	
July 3	(Nigeria) Tonye Jekiri	(Turkey) Gaziantep	(France) ASVEL	1	
July 4	(Latvia) Rihards Lomažs	(Latvia) Ventspils	(France) ASVEL	2	
July 4	(Poland) Mateusz Ponitka	(Russia) Lokomotiv Kuban	(Russia) Zenit	2	
July 6	(Spain) Nikola Mirotić	(United States) Milwaukee Bucks	(Spain) Barcelona	3	
July 6	(United States) Brandon Paul	(China) Zhejiang Golden Bulls	(Greece) Olympiacos	2	
July 8	(United States) Tim Abromaitis	(Spain) Iberostar Tenerife	(Russia) Zenit	2	
July 8	(Latvia) Dairis Bertāns	(United States) New Orleans Pelicans	(Russia) Khimki	2	
July 8	(United States) Makai Mason	(United States) Baylor University	(Germany) Alba Berlin	2	
July 8	(United States) Augustine Rubit	(Germany) Brose Bamberg	(Greece) Olympiacos	2	
July 9	(Nigeria) Michael Eric	(Turkey) Darüşşafaka	(Spain) Baskonia	2	
July 9	(Argentina) Nicolás Laprovíttola	(Spain) Joventut Badalona	(Spain) Real Madrid	2	
July 9	(Mexico) Alex Pérez	(Turkey) Banvit	(Lithuania) Žalgiris	1+1	
July 11	(United States) T.J. Bray	(Germany) Rasta Vechta	(Germany) Bayern Munich	2	
July 11	(United States) Colton Iverson	(Spain) Iberostar Tenerife	(Russia) Zenit	1	
July 12	(Spain) Álex Abrines	(United States) Oklahoma City Thunder	(Spain) Barcelona	3	
July 14	(Spain) Quino Colom	(Turkey) Bahçeşehir	(Spain) Valencia	2	
July 15	(United States) Jimmer Fredette	(United States) Phoenix Suns	(Greece) Panathinaikos	2	
July 15	(United States) Austin Hollins	(Germany) Rasta Vechta	(Russia) Zenit	2	
July 16	(Turkey) Berkay Candan	(Turkey) Büyükçekmece	(Turkey) Fenerbahçe	2	
July 16	(Italy) Riccardo Moraschini	(Italy) Brindisi	(Italy) AX Olimpia Milan	3	
July 16	(Senegal) Maurice Ndour	(Russia) UNICS	(Spain) Valencia	1	
July 16	(United States) Jacob Wiley	(Spain) Gran Canaria	(Greece) Panathinaikos	1	
July 17	(United States) Wade Baldwin	(Canada) Raptors 905	(Greece) Olympiacos	2	
July 17	(Ghana) Ben Bentil	(Greece) Peristeri	(Greece) Panathinaikos	2	
July 17	(United States) Pierriá Henry	(Russia) UNICS	(Spain) Baskonia	1	
July 17	(Russia) Anton Ponkrashov	(Russia) UNICS	(Russia) Zenit	1	
July 18	(United States) Ethan Happ	(United States) University of Wisconsin	(Greece) Olympiacos	2	
July 19	(United States) Rion Brown	(Greece) Promitheas Patras	(Greece) Panathinaikos	1+1	
July 19	(Greece) Kosta Koufos	(United States) Sacramento Kings	(Russia) CSKA Moscow	1	
July 20	(Sweden) Marcus Eriksson	(Spain) Gran Canaria	(Germany) Alba Berlin	4	
July 21	(United States) Tyler Cavanaugh	(United States) Utah Jazz	(Germany) Alba Berlin	1	
July 22	(Italy) Paul Biligha	(Italy) Reyer Venezia	(Italy) AX Olimpia Milan	3	
July 22	(United States) Wesley Johnson	(United States) Washington Wizards	(Greece) Panathinaikos	1	
July 23	(United States) Elijah Bryant	(Israel) Hapoel Eilat	(Israel) Maccabi Tel Aviv	2	
July 24	(United States) Josh Huestis	(United States) Austin Spurs	(Germany) Bayern Munich	1	
July 25	(United States) Jeremy Evans	(Turkey) Darüşşafaka	(Russia) Khimki	1	
July 25	(United States) Shelvin Mack	(United States) Charlotte Hornets	(Italy) AX Olimpia Milan	2	
July 25	(Serbia) Vanja Marinković	(Serbia) Partizan	(Spain) Valencia	2	
July 25	(United States) Greg Monroe	(United States) Philadelphia 76ers	(Germany) Bayern Munich	1	
July 31	(United States) Quincy Acy	(China) Shenzhen Leopards	(Israel) Maccabi Tel Aviv	1	
July 31	(Italy) Diego Flaccadori	(Italy) Trento	(Germany) Bayern Munich	2	
July 31	(Russia) Timofey Mozgov	(United States) Orlando Magic	(Russia) Khimki	1	
August 1	(United States) Ron Baker	(United States) Washington Wizards	(Russia) CSKA Moscow	1	
August 1	(France) Mathias Lessort	(Spain) Unicaja	(Germany) Bayern Munich	1	
August 1	(Canada) Nik Stauskas	(United States) Cleveland Cavaliers	(Spain) Baskonia	1	
August 3	(United States) Lorenzo Brown	(China) Guangzhou Loong Lions	(Serbia) Crvena zvezda	1	
August 4	(United States) Chris Kramer	(Lithuania) Rytas	(Russia) Khimki	1+1	
August 5	(United States) Jordan Loyd	(Canada) Toronto Raptors	(Spain) Valencia	1	
August 5	(Germany) Paul Zipser	(Spain) San Pablo Burgos	(Germany) Bayern Munich	2	
August 7	(Georgia (country)) Will Thomas	(Spain) Valencia	(Russia) Zenit	2	
August 12	(Greece) Ioannis Athinaiou	(France) Fos	(Greece) Panathinaikos	1	
August 12	(United States) Sandy Cohen	(United States) University of Wisconsin–Green Bay	(Israel) Maccabi Tel Aviv	4	
August 13	(Israel) Omri Casspi	(United States) Memphis Grizzlies	(Israel) Maccabi Tel Aviv	3	
August 14	(Greece) Vasilis Charalampopoulos	(Greece) Lavrio	(Greece) Olympiacos	4	
August 14	(Sweden) Jonas Jerebko	(United States) Golden State Warriors	(Russia) Khimki	2	
August 17	(Greece) Tyler Dorsey	(United States) Memphis Grizzlies	(Israel) Maccabi Tel Aviv	1+1	
August 28	(Italy) Achille Polonara	(Italy) Dinamo Sassari	(Spain) Baskonia	2	
September 12	(United States) Malcolm Delaney	(China) Guangdong Southern Tigers	(Spain) Barcelona	1+1	
September 17	(Lithuania) Karolis Lukošiūnas	(Lithuania) Šiauliai	(Lithuania) Žalgiris	1	
September 25	(Serbia) Vladimir Štimac	(Turkey) Türk Telekom	(Turkey) Fenerbahçe	3 months	
September 29	(Argentina) Luis Scola	(China) Shanghai Sharks	(Italy) AX Olimpia Milan	1	
October 10	(Tunisia) Salah Mejri	(United States) Dallas Mavericks	(Spain) Real Madrid	1	
October 26	(United States) Willie Reed	(United States) Salt Lake City Stars	(Greece) Olympiacos	1	
October 26	(United States) Taylor Rochestie	(China) Anhui Dragons	(Greece) Olympiacos	1	
November 22	(Germany) Bogdan Radosavljević	(Italy) Brindisi	(Germany) Alba Berlin	2 months	
November 22	(United States) K.C. Rivers	(Spain) Real Betis	(Lithuania) Žalgiris	1	
December 16	(United States) Aaron Jackson	(China) Beijing Ducks	(Israel) Maccabi Tel Aviv	1	
December 5	(Spain) Sergi García	(Germany) Rasta Vechta	(Spain) Baskonia	1	
December 20	(Serbia) Marko Jagodić-Kuridža	(Slovenia) Primorska	(Serbia) Crvena zvezda	1	
December 23	(United States) Malcolm Thomas	(China) Shanxi Loongs	(Turkey) Fenerbahçe	1	
December 27	(United States) Keifer Sykes	(China) Guangzhou Loong Lions	(Italy) AX Olimpia Milan	1	
December 28	(United States) Jalen Reynolds	(United States) Stockton Kings	(Israel) Maccabi Tel Aviv	1	
December 28	(Slovenia) Žan Mark Šiško	(Slovenia) Primorska	(Germany) Bayern Munich	3	
January 3	(United States) James Nunnally	(China) Shanghai Sharks	(Turkey) Fenerbahçe	1	
January 10	(Canada) Andy Rautins	(Turkey) Bahçeşehir Koleji	(Greece) Panathinaikos	1	
January 11	(Cuba) Howard Sant-Roos	(Greece) AEK	(Russia) CSKA Moscow	1+2	
January 22	(United States) Amar'e Stoudemire	(China) Fujian Sturgeons	(Israel) Maccabi Tel Aviv	1	
January 27	(United States) Semaj Christon	(France) Limoges	(Spain) Baskonia	1	
January 27	(United States) Drew Crawford	(Turkey) Gaziantep	(Italy) AX Olimpia Milan	1	
January 27	(United States) Octavius Ellis	(Greece) Promitheas Patras	(Greece) Olympiacos	2	
January 30	(Slovenia) Zoran Dragić	(Germany) Ratiopharm Ulm	(Spain) Baskonia	1	
February 6	(United States) Thomas Robinson	(China) Sichuan Blue Whales	(Russia) Khimki	1 month	
February 10	(United States) Shaquielle McKissic	(Turkey) Beşiktaş	(Greece) Olympiacos	1 month	
February 15	(United States) Kalin Lucas	(United States) Detroit Pistons	(Serbia) Crvena zvezda	1	
February 17	(United States) Davion Berry	(Russia) Enisey	(France) ASVEL	1+1	
February 18	(United States) Dwight Buycks	(China) Shenzhen Leopards	(Greece) Olympiacos	2	
February 25	(France) Guerschon Yabusele	(China) Nanjing Monkey Kings	(France) ASVEL	1	

=== Leaving a EuroLeague team ===
Date	Player	From	To	Ref.
May 3	(Germany) Maik Zirbes	(Serbia) Crvena zvezda	(China) Guangxi Weizhuang	
June 17	(United States) Deon Thompson	(Lithuania) Žalgiris	(Spain) Unicaja	
June 20	(Slovenia) Alen Omić	(Italy) AX Olimpia Milano	(Spain) Joventut Badalona	
June 25	(Germany) Hundt Bennet	(Germany) Alba Berlin	(Germany) Göttingen	
July 1	(United States) Braydon Hobbs	(Germany) Bayern Munich	(Germany) EWE Baskets Oldenburg	
July 1	(Poland) A.J. Slaughter	(France) ASVEL	(Spain) Real Betis	
July 7	(Germany) Franz Wagner	(Germany) Alba Berlin	(United States) University of Michigan	
July 10	(Spain) Rafa Martínez	(Spain) Valencia	(Spain) Bilbao	
July 10	(Germany) Joshiko Saibou	(Germany) Alba Berlin	(Germany) Telekom Baskets Bonn	
July 13	(Croatia) Miro Bilan	(France) ASVEL	(Italy) Dinamo Sassari	
July 13	(Israel) Alex Tyus	(Israel) Maccabi Tel Aviv	(Russia) UNICS	
July 13	(Spain) Santiago Yusta	(Spain) Real Madrid	(Spain) Iberostar Tenerife	
July 15	(France) Vincent Poirier	(Spain) Baskonia	(United States) Boston Celtics	
July 16	(Greece) Thanasis Antetokounmpo	(Greece) Panathinaikos	(United States) Milwaukee Bucks	
July 17	(Turkey) Metecan Birsen	(Turkey) Anadolu Efes	(Turkey) Pınar Karşıyaka	
July 17	(Austria) Marvin Ogunsipe	(Germany) Bayern Munich	(Germany) Hamburg Towers	
July 17	(Canada) Philip Scrubb	(Russia) Zenit	(Spain) Estudiantes	
July 18	(Italy) Simone Fontecchio	(Italy) AX Olimpia Milano	(Italy) Reggio Emilia	
July 18	(Serbia) Marko Simonović	(Russia) Zenit	(Slovenia) Cedevita Olimpija	
July 19	(United States) Tony Crocker	(Russia) Khimki	(Turkey) Pınar Karşıyaka	
July 19	(United States) Joe Ragland	(Serbia) Crvena zvezda	(Turkey) Darüşşafaka	
July 19	(United States) Matt Thomas	(Spain) Valencia	(Canada) Toronto Raptors	
July 19	(United States) Nigel Williams-Goss	(Greece) Olympiacos	(United States) Utah Jazz	
July 20	(Slovenia) Jaka Blažič	(Spain) Barcelona	(Slovenia) Cedevita Olimpija	
July 20	(Greece) Vangelis Mantzaris	(Greece) Olympiacos	(Russia) UNICS	
July 22	(Serbia) Nemanja Dangubić	(Germany) Bayern Munich	(Spain) Estudiantes	
July 22	(United States) Codi Miller-McIntyre	(Russia) Zenit	(Slovenia) Cedevita Olimpija	
July 22	(Germany) Nelson Weidemann	(Germany) Bayern Munich	(Germany) Brose Bamberg	
July 23	(United States) Dennis Clifford	(Germany) Alba Berlin	(Bosnia and Herzegovina) Igokea	
July 23	(Brazil) Marcelo Huertas	(Spain) Baskonia	(Spain) Iberostar Tenerife	
July 24	(Spain) Sergi García	(Spain) Valencia	(Germany) Rasta Vechta	
July 24	(Serbia) Milan Mačvan	(Germany) Bayern Munich	(Japan) Alvark Tokyo	
July 24	(France) Kevin Séraphin	(Spain) Barcelona	(China) Xinjiang Flying Tigers	
July 25	(Italy) Nicolò Melli	(Turkey) Fenerbahçe	(United States) New Orleans Pelicans	
July 26	(Serbia) Dušan Ristić	(Serbia) Crvena zvezda	(Kazakhstan) Astana	
July 26	(Lithuania) Tadas Sedekerskis	(Spain) Baskonia	(Lithuania) Neptūnas Klaipeda	
July 26	(United States) Derrick Walton	(Germany) Alba Berlin	(United States) Los Angeles Clippers	
July 28	(Turkey) Onuralp Bitim	(Turkey) Anadolu Efes	(Turkey) Pınar Karşıyaka	
July 29	(Greece) Giorgos Bogris	(Greece) Olympiacos	(Greece) Promitheas Patras	
July 29	(United States) Keith Langford	(Greece) Panathinaikos	(Greece) AEK	
July 31	(Serbia) Marko Gudurić	(Turkey) Fenerbahçe	(United States) Memphis Grizzlies	
August 1	(United States) Curtis Jerrells	(Italy) AX Olimpia Milano	(Italy) Dinamo Sassari	
August 2	(Lithuania) Mantas Kalnietis	(France) ASVEL	(Russia) Lokomotiv Kuban	
August 2	(Serbia) Stefan Marković	(Russia) Khimki	(Italy) Virtus Bologna	
August 4	(United States) Sean Armand	(Russia) Zenit	(Turkey) Bahçeşehir	
August 5	(Germany) Robin Amaize	(Germany) Bayern Munich	(Germany) EWE Baskets Oldenburg	
August 5	(Belgium) Matt Lojeski	(Greece) Panathinaikos	(Turkey) Tofaş	
August 6	(Greece) Dimitrios Agravanis	(Greece) Olympiacos	(Greece) Promitheas Patras	
August 6	(Slovenia) Klemen Prepelič	(Spain) Real Madrid	(Spain) Joventut Badalona	
August 9	(Serbia) Aleksa Radanov	(Serbia) Crvena zvezda	(Serbia) FMP	
August 12	(United States) James Nunnally	(Italy) AX Olimpia Milan	(China) Shanghai Sharks	
August 13	(Senegal) Khadim Sow	(France) ASVEL	(Spain) Estudiantes	
August 14	(United States) Johnny O'Bryant	(Israel) Maccabi Tel Aviv	(Russia) Lokomotiv Kuban	
August 20	(United States) K.C. Rivers	(Serbia) Crvena zvezda	(Spain) Real Betis	
November 7	(United States) Ethan Happ	(Greece) Olympiacos	(Italy) Vanoli Cremona	
November 11	(Lithuania) Mindaugas Kuzminskas	(Greece) Olympiacos	(Russia) Lokomotiv Kuban	
December 19	(Serbia) Nemanja Nenadić	(Serbia) Crvena zvezda	(Serbia) Mega Bemax	
January 2	(Germany) Bogdan Radosavljević	(Germany) Alba Berlin	(Germany) Hamburg Towers	
January 10	(United States) Rion Brown	(Greece) Panathinaikos	(Turkey) Tofaş	
January 16	(United States) Shelvin Mack	(Italy) AX Olimpia Milano	(Israel) Hapoel Jerusalem	
February 13	(France) Edwin Jackson	(France) ASVEL	(Spain) Estudiantes	
