= Saša Kosović =

Bosnian-Serbian basketball player and coach

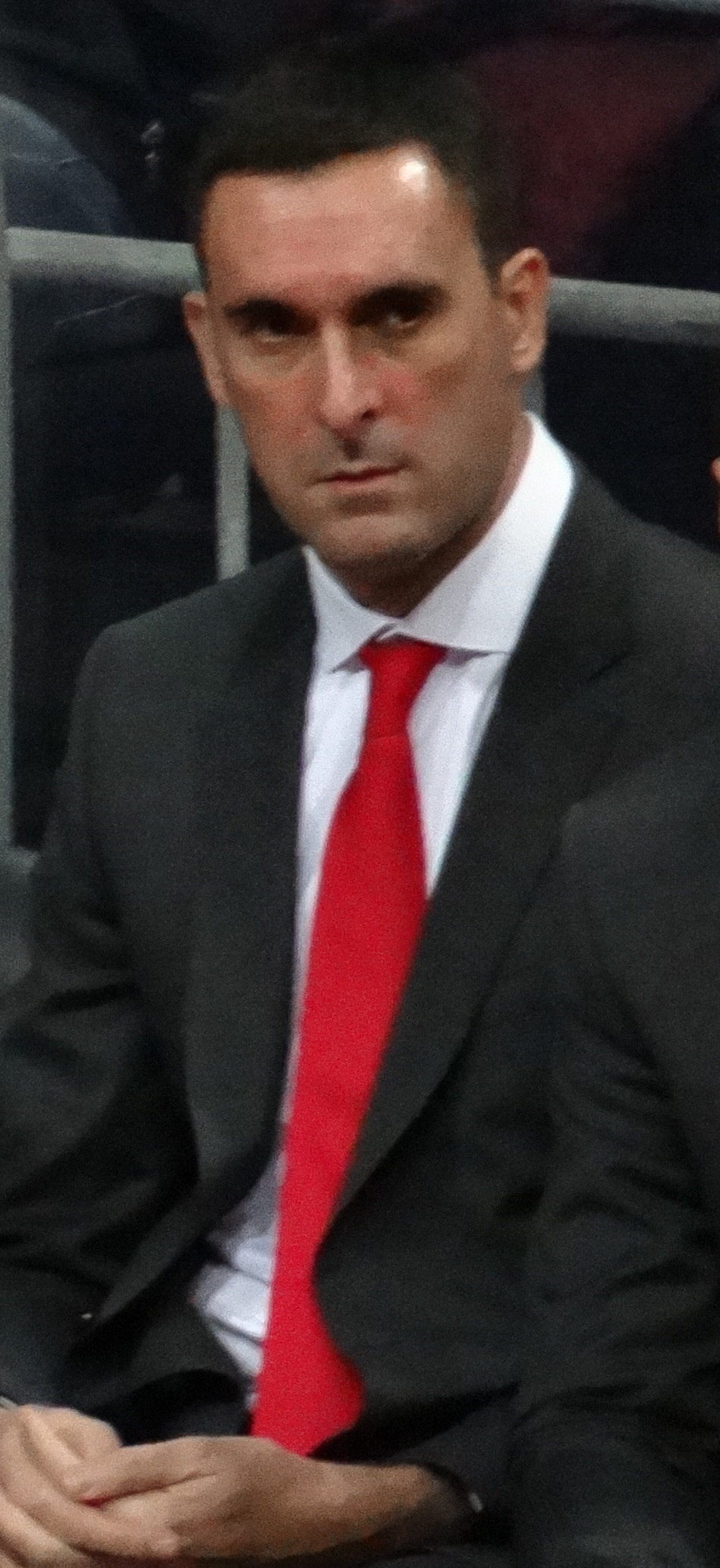
- Kosović with Crvena zvezda in 2017

Zenit Saint Petersburg
- Position: Assistant coach
- League: VTB United League

Personal information
- Born: July 18, 1979 (age 47) Sarajevo, SR Bosnia-Herzegovina, SFR Yugoslavia
- Listed height: 2.00 m (6 ft 7 in)

Career information
- Playing career: 1997–1999
- Coaching career: 2002–present

Career history

Coaching
- 2007–2010: Leotar (assistant)
- 2010–2011: FMP (assistant)
- 2011–2022: Crvena zvezda (assistant)
- 2024–2025: Bahçeşehir Koleji (assistant)
- 2026–present: Zenit Saint Petersburg (assistant)

Saša Kosović (Serbian Cyrillic: Саша Косовић; born July 18, 1979) is a Serbian–Bosnian professional basketball coach and former player. He is the current assistant coach for Zenit Saint Petersburg of the VTB United League.

== Early life ==
Kosović was born in Sarajevo, SR Bosnia and Herzegovina, SFR Yugoslavia to a Bosnian-Serb family. He started to train basketball at age 7 for his hometown team Bosna. He was born in the same year that Bosnia won the European Champions Cup. He trained there until 1992 when he had to move because of the war.

Kosović played for Mladost from Gacko and Leotar Trebinje. After two seasons playing in the First League of Republika Srpska, he decided to retire as a player. In 1999, he moved to Belgrade, Serbia to start his professional education. Kosović earned his bachelor's degree in physical education from the University of Belgrade in 2006. In 2014, he graduated from a program for a basketball coach.

== Coaching career ==
=== Early career ===
Kosović began his coaching career in 2002. In the first years, he worked for Belgrade-based teams; Cerak and Beoas. In 2007, he went back to Trebinje where he became an assistant coach for his former team Leotar of the Basketball Championship of Bosnia and Herzegovina. After three seasons he returns to Belgrade, Serbia.

In the 2010–11 season, Kosović was an assistant coach for the FMP of the Basketball League of Serbia, working under the club's head coaches Boško Đokić and Aleksandar Petrović.

In the late 2000s and early 2010s, Kosović was a coach at the Bodiroga Basketball Camp in Trebinje.

=== Crvena zvezda assistant (2011–2022) ===
On the start of the 2011–12 season, Crvena zvezda has added Kosović to their coaching staff as an assistant coach. Since then he has been a part of coaching staffs of the Zvezda head coaches, as follows Svetislav Pešić, Milivoje Lazić, Vlada Vukoičić, Dejan Radonjić, Dušan Alimpijević, Milenko Topić, Milan Tomić, Andrija Gavrilović, Dragan Šakota, and Saša Obradović. Over eleven seasons with the Zvezda, he won 20 national and Adriatic titles.

== National team coaching career ==
In August 2022, Kosović was named an assistant coach for the Serbia national team under Svetislav Pešić. He was a staff member at EuroBasket 2022.

== Career achievements ==
As assistant coach

- Serbian League champion: 7 (with Crvena zvezda: 2014–15, 2015–16, 2016–17, 2017–18, 2018–19, 2020–21, 2021–22)
- Adriatic League champion: 6 (with Crvena zvezda: 2014–15, 2015–16, 2016–17, 2018–19, 2020–21, 2021–22)
- Serbian Cup winner: 6 (with Crvena zvezda: 2012–13, 2013–14, 2014–15, 2016–17, 2020–21, 2021–22)
- Adriatic SuperCup winner: 1 (with Crvena zvezda: 2018)
