= 2019–20 KK Crvena zvezda season =

Season of basketball team

Crvena zvezda mts
2019–20 season
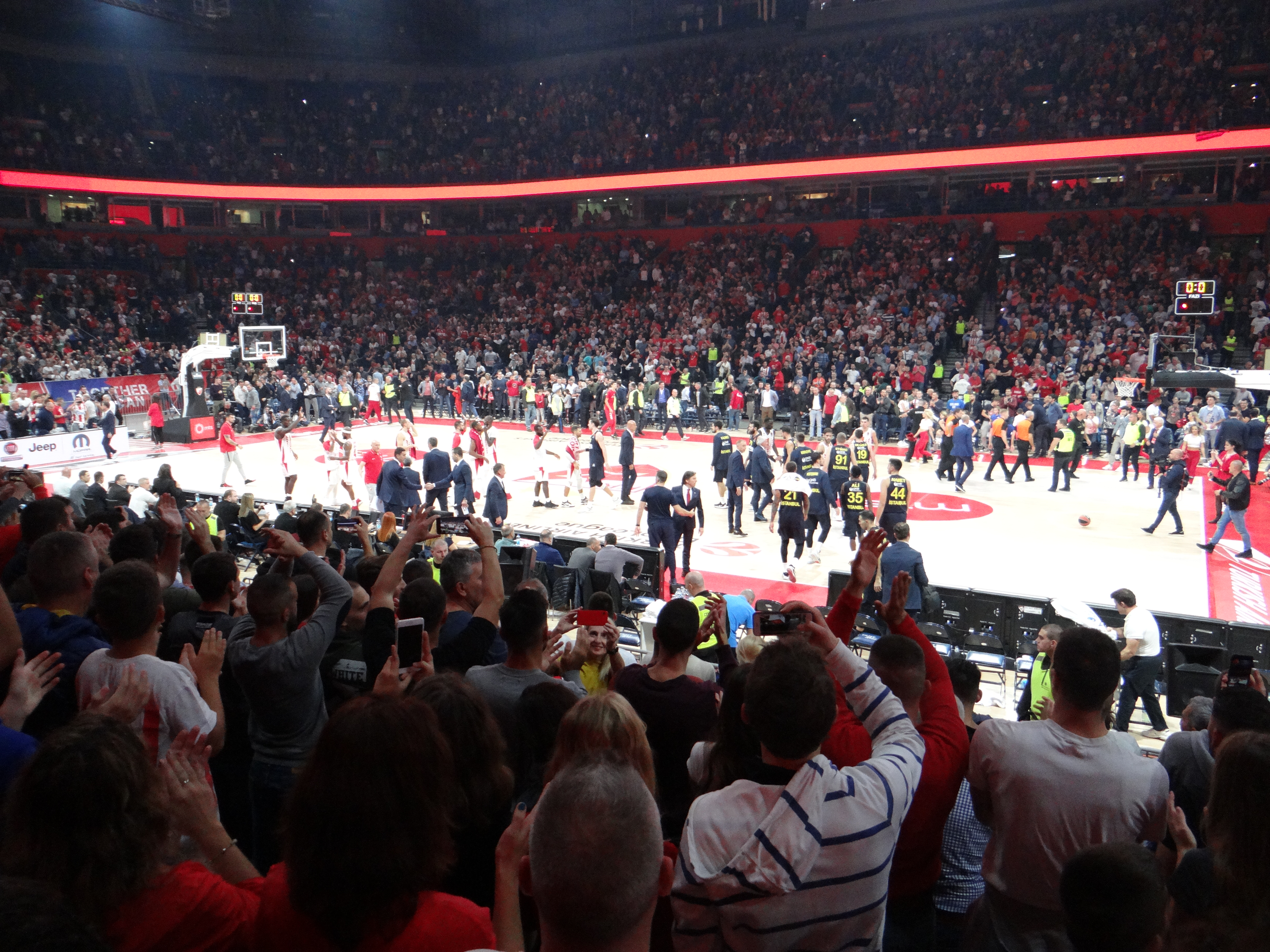
- Home game in October 2019
- President: (Serbia) Nebojša Čović
- Head coach: (Serbia) Milan Tomić (until 22 October 2019) (Serbia) Andrija Gavrilović (22 October – 23 November 2019) (Serbia) Dragan Šakota (from 23 November 2019)
- Arena: Aleksandar Nikolić Hall; Štark Arena
- ABA League: Canceled
- Serbian League: Canceled (didn't started)
- EuroLeague: Canceled
- Serbian Cup: Runners-up
- Adriatic Supercup: Quarterfinals
- Highest home attendance: 16,879; 68–56 (Turkey) Fenerbahçe Beko (10 October 2019)
- Lowest home attendance: 196; 90–64 (Slovenia) Koper Primorska (6 October 2019)
- Average home attendance: 11744 (Euroleague); 2471 (Adriatic League)
- Biggest win: +43; 104–61 (Bosnia and Herzegovina) Igokea (11 November 2019)
- Biggest defeat: –26; 74–100 (Russia) CSKA Moscow (18 December 2019)
Home	Away
- All statistics correct as of May 29, 2020.

The 2019–20 KK Crvena zvezda season was the 75th season in the existence of the club. For the season it is referred to as KK Crvena zvezda mts for sponsorship reasons. The club played in the Adriatic League and the EuroLeague, which were canceled due to the COVID-19 pandemic. The season in the Basketball League of Serbia had no start due to the same reason.

== Overview ==
On 18 June 2019, the Finals MVP of the Adriatic League and the Serbian League guard Billy Baron extended contract for one more season. On June 24, guard Branko Lazić signed a three-year contract extension. On June 25, guard Filip Čović signed a two-year contract extension. On June 26, forward Boriša Simanić signed a two-year contract extension. On June 28, forward Mouhammad Faye signed a one-year contract extension. On July 2, forward Stratos Perperoglou signed a one-year contract extension. On July 6, guard Ognjen Dobrić signed a two-year contract extension. On 28 August, center Nikola Jovanović signed a new contract. Forward Faye was a member of the Senegal national team at the 2019 FIBA Basketball World Cup in China.

On July 14, center Ognjen Kuzmić was involved in serious traffic accident near Banja Luka, Bosnia and Herzegovina, in which he got life-threatening injuries. On July 25, Kuzmić was discharged from the hospital to home care.

The Zvezda entered season poorly, getting relegated from ABA Supercup in the first match, losing 2 out of 3 games in ABA and having the same score in EuroLeague. Head coach Milan Tomić resigned less than a month after the season kicked off, leaving assistant Andrija Gavrilović, who never held a head coach position before, as an interim solution. In his official head coaching debut on 24 October, Gavrilović led the Zvezda to a 73–65 loss to FC Barcelona. Gavrilović failed to make any notable progress, which added to the bad atmosphere around the club. Gavrilović finished his stint as the interim head coach with a 5–6 record on 23 November. Upset by his poor performances, the Zvezda fans started booing Filip Čović. Club management reacted at the end of December, hiring Dragan Šakota as a head coach and reinforcing squad with center Vladimir Štimac and guard Kevin Punter. Forward Derrick Brown and Faye agreed with the club to terminate their contracts in January. By mid-February the Zvezda loaned Čović and Kuzmić to FMP, bringing in guard Kalin Lucas instead.

=== Season canceled ===
On 12 March 2020, ABA League Assembly temporarily suspended the remainder of the 2019–20 season "until further notice" following the coronavirus pandemic. The club still remains to play one game until the end of the regular season and at least the semifinals of the 2020 playoffs. On 12 March 2020, Euroleague announced it was suspending its competitions due to the same reason. At that point, Zvezda held 3rd position in ABA with one round left to be played, and 14th position in Euroleague, with six rounds remaining. On 12 May, the team came back after the break and started with a training program. On 25 May, Euroleague canceled its 2019–20 season. The Zvezda will return to Euroleague for the next season. On 27 May 2020, the ABA League Assembly canceled definitely the 2019–20 season due to the COVID-19 pandemic. The Serbian SuperLeague season was suspended prior its start due to the COVID-19 pandemic. On 28 May, the Serbian League Assembly canceled definitely the 2019–20 season due to the COVID-19 pandemic.

== Players ==
=== Squad information ===
Note: Flags indicate national team eligibility at FIBA-sanctioned events. Players may hold other non-FIBA nationalities not displayed.

Crvena zvezda mts roster
Players
Coaches

Pos.	No.	Nat.	Name	Ht.	Wt.	Age
SG	12	(United States)	Baron, Billy	1.88 m (6 ft 2 in)	88 kg (194 lb)	35 – 11 December 1990
PG	4	(United States)	Brown, Lorenzo	1.96 m (6 ft 5 in)	86 kg (190 lb)	36 – 26 August 1990
G/F	7	(Serbia)	Davidovac, Dejan	2.03 m (6 ft 8 in)	95 kg (209 lb)	31 – 17 January 1995
G/F	13	(Serbia)	Dobrić, Ognjen	2.00 m (6 ft 7 in)	93 kg (205 lb)	31 – 27 October 1994
F/C	15	(United States)	Gist, James	2.07 m (6 ft 9 in)	107 kg (236 lb)	39 – 26 October 1986
PF	21	(Serbia)	Jagodić-Kuridža, Marko	2.05 m (6 ft 9 in)	104 kg (229 lb)	39 – 15 May 1987
G	22	(Serbia)	Jenkins, Charles	1.91 m (6 ft 3 in)	100 kg (220 lb)	37 – 28 February 1989
F/C	32	(Serbia)	Jovanović, Nikola	2.11 m (6 ft 11 in)	113 kg (249 lb)	32 – 6 January 1994
G/F	10	(Serbia)	Lazić, Branko (C)	1.95 m (6 ft 5 in)	91 kg (201 lb)	37 – 12 January 1989
PG	16	(United States)	Lucas, Kalin	1.85 m (6 ft 1 in)	86 kg (190 lb)	37 – 24 May 1989
C	50	(Nigeria)	Ojo, Michael	2.16 m (7 ft 1 in)	138 kg (304 lb)	33 – 5 January 1993
SF	5	(Greece)	Perperoglou, Stratos	2.03 m (6 ft 8 in)	104 kg (229 lb)	42 – 7 August 1984
G	00	(United States)	Punter, Kevin	1.93 m (6 ft 4 in)	86 kg (190 lb)	33 – 25 June 1993
PF	28	(Serbia)	Simanić, Boriša	2.09 m (6 ft 10 in)	95 kg (209 lb)	28 – 20 March 1998
C	91	(Serbia)	Štimac, Vladimir	2.11 m (6 ft 11 in)	116 kg (256 lb)	39 – 25 August 1987

Head coach

- (Serbia) Dragan Šakota

Assistant coach(es)

- (Serbia) Andrija Gavrilović
- (Serbia) Milenko Topić
- (Serbia) Saša Kosović

Strength & conditioning coach(es)

- (Serbia) Aleksandar Lukman

Team manager

- (Serbia) Nebojša Ilić

Legend

- (C) Team captain
- Injured

- Roster
Updated: February 15, 2020

=== Players with multiple nationalities ===
- (Serbia) (Croatia) Marko Jagodić-Kuridža
- (United States) (Serbia) Charles Jenkins
- (Nigeria) (United States) Michael Ojo
- (United States) (Serbia) Kevin Punter

=== Depth chart ===
Pos.	Starting 5	Bench 1	Bench 2	Reserves / Injured
C	Vladimir Štimac	Michael Ojo		Nikola Jovanović
PF	Marko Jagodić-Kuridža	James Gist	Boriša Simanić
SF	Branko Lazić	Dejan Davidovac	Stratos Perperoglou
SG	Billy Baron	Kevin Punter		Ognjen Dobrić
PG	Lorenzo Brown	Charles Jenkins		Kalin Lucas

=== On loan ===
KK Crvena zvezda players out on loan
Nat.	Player	Position	Team	On loan since
(Serbia)	Stefan Lazarević	SG/SF	(Serbia) FMP	December 2017
(Serbia)	Stefan Đorđević	PF	(Serbia) FMP	August 2018
(Serbia)	Dušan Ristić	C	(Kazakhstan) Astana	July 2019
(Serbia)	Aleksa Radanov	SG/SF	(Serbia) FMP	August 2019
(Serbia)	Marko Pavićević	PF/C	(Serbia) Tamiš	September 2019
(Serbia)	Lazar Vasić	PG	(Serbia) Tamiš	September 2019
(Serbia)	Ranko Simović	SF	(Serbia) FMP (Serbia) Sloboda	April–December 2019; December 2019
(Serbia)	Arijan Lakić	PG/SG	(Croatia) Vrijednosnice Osijek	December 2019
(Serbia)	Nemanja Nenadić	SG	(Serbia) Mega Bemax	December 2019
(Serbia)	Ognjen Kuzmić	C	(Serbia) FMP	February 2020
(Serbia)	Filip Čović	PG	(Serbia) FMP	February 2020

=== Transactions ===
==== Players In ====
No.	Pos.	Nat.	Name	Moving from		Type	Date	Source
1	PF	(United States)	Derrick Brown	Anadolu Efes	(Turkey)	End of contract	27 June 2019	
0	C	(Serbia)	Ognjen Kuzmić	Real Madrid	(Spain)	End of contract	3 July 2019	
22	G	(Serbia)	Charles Jenkins	Khimki	(Russia)	End of contract	5 July 2019	
15	F/C	(United States)	James Gist	Panathinaikos	(Greece)	End of contract	8 July 2019	
32	F/C	(Serbia)	Nikola Jovanović	Dolomiti Energia Trento	(Italy)	Loan return	28 July 2019	
4	PG	(United States)	Lorenzo Brown	Guangzhou Long Lions	(China)	End of contract	3 August 2019	
21	PF	(Serbia)	Marko Jagodić-Kuridža	Koper Primorska	(Slovenia)	Parted ways	19 December 2019	
91	C	(Serbia)	Vladimir Štimac	Fenerbahçe	(Turkey)	End of contract	25 December 2019	
00	SG	(United States)	Kevin Punter	Olympiacos	(Greece)	Parted ways	27 December 2019	
16	PG	(United States)	Kalin Lucas	Detroit Pistons	(United States)	End of contract	14 February 2020	

==== Players Out ====
No.	Pos.	Nat.	Name	Moving to		Type	Date	Source
4	SF	(Serbia)	Marko Kešelj	Retired		End of contract	July 2019	
1	PG	(United States)	Joe Ragland	Darüşşafaka	(Turkey)	End of contract	19 July 2019	
14	C	(Serbia)	Dušan Ristić	Astana	(Kazakhstan)	Loan	26 July 2019	
2	G/F	(Serbia)	Aleksa Radanov	FMP	(Serbia)	Loan	9 August 2019	
23	G/F	(United States)	K. C. Rivers	Coosur Real Betis	(Spain)	End of contract	20 August 2019	
–	SG	(Serbia)	Zoran Paunović	Dynamic VIP PAY	(Serbia)	Parted ways^{1}	11 September 2019	
20	G/F	(Serbia)	Petar Rakićević	Krka	(Slovenia)	End of contract^{1}	3 October 2019	
9	SG	(Serbia)	Nemanja Nenadić	Mega Bemax	(Serbia)	Loan	19 December 2019	
1	PF	(United States)	Derrick Brown	Free agent		Waived	5 February 2020	
11	PF	(Senegal)	Mouhammad Faye	Avtodor	(Russia)	Parted ways	7 February 2020	
0	C	(Serbia)	Ognjen Kuzmić	FMP	(Serbia)	Loan	11 February 2020	
3	PG	(Serbia)	Filip Čović	FMP	(Serbia)	Loan	11 February 2020	

Notes:

- ^{1} On loan during the 2018–19 season.

== Club ==
=== Technical Staff ===
On 2 October, Crvena zvezda named Žarko Čabarkapa as a new sports director. On 22 October, head coach Milan Tomić resigned from his post. Assistant coach Andrija Gavrilović was named as the interim head coach. Afterwards, Serbian-Greek Dragan Šakota was named as the new head coach on 23 November.

Position	Staff member
General Manager	(Serbia) Filip Sunturlić
Sports Director	(Montenegro) (Serbia) Žarko Čabarkapa
Team Manager	(Serbia) Nebojša Ilić
Head Coach	(Serbia) (Greece) Dragan Šakota
Assistant Coaches	(Serbia) (Italy) Andrija Gavrilović
Assistant Coaches	(Serbia) Milenko Topić
Assistant Coaches	(Serbia) (Bosnia and Herzegovina) Saša Kosović
Conditioning Coach	(Serbia) Aleksandar Lukman
Physiotherapist	(Serbia) Milorad Ćirić
Physicians	(Serbia) Nebojša Mitrović
Physicians	(Serbia) Boris Gluščević

Source: Crvena zvezda Staff

=== Uniform ===
The following is a list of corporate sponsorship patches on a uniform of Crvena zvezda and uniform designs for the 2019–20 season.

Crvena zvezda debuted their new uniforms for the 2019–20 season after unveiling their new uniforms on 22 September 2019.

- Supplier: Nike
- Main sponsor: mts
- Back sponsor: Idea (top), Komercijalna banka (bottom)
- Shorts sponsor: None

Home	Away	Royal	Wings

== Pre-season games ==
The Zvezda roster played six exhibition games and went undefeated.

Win Loss

1 September 2019 1	Crvena zvezda mts (Serbia)	90–74	(Germany) Brose Bamberg	Belgrade
18:00	Scoring by quarter: 18–15, 23–27, 20–18, 29–14
	Pts: D. Brown 14; Rebs: Jovanović, L. Brown 5 Asts: L. Brown 11; PIR: not available	Boxscore	Pts: Sengfelder 13; Rebs: not available Asts: not available PIR: not available	Arena: Železnik Hall; Attendance: 0 Referees: not available

4 September 2019 2	Crvena zvezda mts (Serbia)	92–73	(Turkey) Darüşşafaka	Belgrade
18:00	Scoring by quarter: 23–16, 26–16, 17–23, 26–18
	Pts: Perperoglou 17; Rebs: D. Brown 7 Asts: D. Brown 8 PIR: not available	Boxscore	Pts: Lamb 18; Rebs: not available Asts: not available PIR: not available	Arena: Štark Arena; Attendance: not available Referees: not available

8 September 2019 3	Crvena zvezda mts (Serbia)	90–72	(Montenegro) Mornar	Belgrade
17:30	Scoring by quarter: 26–19, 19–17, 23–17, 22–19
	Pts: Gist 18; Rebs: D. Brown 10; Asts: L. Brown 7 PIR: not available	Boxscore	Pts: Pullen 28; Rebs: Luković 6 Asts: Vranješ 4 PIR: not available	Arena: Štark Arena; Attendance: 1,500; Referees: not available

17 September 2019 4	Olympiacos (Greece)	77–82	(Serbia) Crvena zvezda mts	Piraeus
17:00	Scoring by quarter: 16–22, 20–19, 20–21, 21–20
	Pts: Punter 17; Rebs: not available Asts: not available PIR: not available	Boxscore	Pts: D. Brown 14; Rebs: not available Asts: not available PIR: not available	Arena: Peace and Friendship Stadium; Attendance: 0 Referees: not available

19 September 2019 5	Peristeri Vikos Cola (Greece)	77–86	(Serbia) Crvena zvezda mts	Athens
18:00	Scoring by quarter: 21–19, 20–19, 16–22, 20–26
	Pts: Hatcher 22; Rebs: not available Asts: not available PIR: not available	Boxscore	Pts: L. Brown 22; Rebs: not available Asts: not available PIR: not available	Arena: Peristeri Hall; Attendance: not available Referees: not available

20 September 2019 6	Olympiacos (Greece)	71–73	(Serbia) Crvena zvezda mts	Piraeus
20:15	Scoring by quarter: 19–20, 16–10, 20–15, 16–28
Arena Sport	Pts: Paul 12; Rebs: Papanikolaou 6 Asts: Spanoulis 3 PIR: not available	Boxscore	Pts: Jenkins 15; Rebs: Gist 6 Asts: L. Brown, Čović 4 PIR: not available	Arena: Peace and Friendship Stadium; Attendance: not available Referees: not available

== Competitions ==
=== Overall ===
Competition	Started round	Final position / round	First match	Last match
Adriatic League	Matchday 1	Canceled	October 6, 2019	March 9, 2020
EuroLeague	Matchday 1	Canceled	October 3, 2019	March 6, 2020
Serbian Super League	Not started	Canceled	None	
Adriatic Supercup	Quarterfinals	Quarterfinals	September 26, 2019	
Radivoj Korać Cup	Quarterfinals	Runners-up	February 13, 2020	February 16, 2020

Updated to match played May 29, 2020
Source: Competitions

=== Overview ===
Competition	Record							
Competition	Pld	W	D	L	PF	PA	PD	Win %
Adriatic League	21	14	0	7	1,758	1,562	+196	66.67
EuroLeague	28	11	0	17	2,079	2,108	−29	39.29
Serbian SuperLeague	0	0	0	0	0	0	+0	—
Adriatic Supercup	1	0	0	1	82	88	−6	0.00
Radivoj Korać Cup	3	2	0	1	271	231	+40	66.67
Total	53	27	0	26	4,190	3,989	+201	50.94

Last updated: March 9, 2020
Source: Competitions

=== Adriatic League ===
==== Regular season ====
Pos	Team	Pld	W	L	PF	PA	PD	Pts
1	(Serbia) Partizan NIS	21	17	4	1754	1538	+216	38
2	(Montenegro) Budućnost VOLI	21	15	6	1713	1517	+196	36
3	(Serbia) Crvena zvezda mts	21	14	7	1758	1562	+196	35
4	(Slovenia) Cedevita Olimpija	21	13	8	1766	1716	+50	34
5	(Montenegro) Mornar	21	13	8	1774	1754	+20	34

Source: Adriatic League

==== Results summary ====
Overall						Home					Away				
Pld	W	L	PF	PA	PD	W	L	PF	PA	PD	W	L	PF	PA	PD
21	14	7	1758	1562	+196	9	1	945	771	+174	5	6	813	791	+22

Last updated: March 9, 2020.
Source: Competitive matches

==== Results by round ====
Round	1	2	3	4	5	6	7	8	9	10	11	12	13	14	15	16	17	18	19	20	21	22
Ground	H	H	A	H	A	H	A	H	A	H	A	A	A	H	A	H	A	H	A	H	A	H
Result	W	L	L	W	W	W	L	W	L	W	L	W	L	W	W	W	W	W	L	W	W	P
Position	1	5	9	5	5	4	6	4	6	5	6	6	7	6	4	3	3	3	3	3	3	–

Last updated: May 28, 2020.
Source: Competitive matches
Ground: A = Away; H = Home; R = Rest. Result: L = Loss; W = Win; R = Rest; P = Postponed.

Win Loss Void

==== Matches ====
All times are local UTC+1.

6 October 2019 1	Crvena zvezda mts (Serbia)	90–64	(Slovenia) Koper Primorska	Belgrade
20:00	Scoring by quarter: 28–21, 17–3, 28–24, 17–16
	Pts: L. Brown 18; Rebs: Faye 8 Asts: L. Brown 10; PIR: L. Brown 30	Boxscore	Pts: Harris 17; Rebs: Jagodić-Kuridža 7 Asts: Šiško 7 PIR: Dimec 17	Arena: Aleksandar Nikolić Hall; Attendance: 196; Referees: Igor Dragojević, Dragan Porobić, Gordan Terlević

13 October 2019 2	Crvena zvezda mts (Serbia)	81–89	(Montenegro) Budućnost VOLI	Belgrade
20:00	Scoring by quarter: 20–26, 22–18, 21–22, 18–23
	Pts: Gist 27; Rebs: Gist 6 Asts: Čović 7 PIR: Gist 31	Boxscore	Pts: Martin 17; Rebs: D. Nikolić 5 Asts: Cobbs 4 PIR: Martin 22	Arena: Aleksandar Nikolić Hall; Attendance: 308; Referees: Ilija Belošević, Damir Javor, Josip Radojković

20 October 2019 3	Krka (Slovenia)	79–77	(Serbia) Crvena zvezda mts	Novo Mesto
18:00	Scoring by quarter: 17–20, 20–25, 18–16, 24–16
	Pts: Cosey 20; Rebs: Ramljak 6 Asts: Cosey 9 PIR: Cosey 30	Boxscore	Pts: Jovanović 16; Rebs: Jovanović, Ojo 7 Asts: L. Brown 7 PIR: Jovanović 20	Arena: Leon Štukelj Hall; Attendance: 1,200; Referees: Sreten Radović, Jakub Zamojski, Matej Špendl

27 October 2019 4	Crvena zvezda mts (Serbia)	88–70	(Serbia) Mega Bemax	Belgrade
17:00	Scoring by quarter: 22–19, 22–21, 30–15, 14–15
	Pts: Davidovac 17; Rebs: Gist 10; Asts: L. Brown, Čović 4 PIR: Gist 20	Boxscore	Pts: Atić, Mišković 13; Rebs: Ašćerić, Stanić 5 Asts: Atić 7 PIR: Atić, Stanić 12	Arena: Železnik Hall; Attendance: 2,065; Referees: Tomislav Hordov, Mario Majkić, Milan Nedović

3 November 2019 5	Cibona (Croatia)	72–83	(Serbia) Crvena zvezda mts	Zagreb
18:00	Scoring by quarter: 18–18, 17–25, 21–25, 16–18
	Pts: Bundović 15; Rebs: Prkačin 6 Asts: Rebec 5 PIR: Bundović 17	Boxscore	Pts: Perperoglou 15; Rebs: Kuzmić 8 Asts: Čović 4 PIR: Kuzmić 17	Arena: Dražen Petrović Basketball Hall; Attendance: 2,300; Referees: Saša Pukl, Uroš Obrknežević, Denis Hadžić

11 November 2019 6	Crvena zvezda mts (Serbia)	103–61	(Bosnia and Herzegovina) Igokea	Belgrade
21:00	Scoring by quarter: 29–18, 24–10, 23–17, 27–16
	Pts: Baron 19; Rebs: Gist 6 Asts: Baron 9 PIR: Baron 27	Boxscore	Pts: Vaughn 19; Rebs: Ilić 7 Asts: Green 4 PIR: Green 19	Arena: Aleksandar Nikolić Hall; Attendance: 2,439; Referees: Miloš Koljenšić, Milivoje Jovčić, Branislav Mrdak

17 November 2019 7	Partizan NIS (Serbia)	75–72	(Serbia) Crvena zvezda mts	Belgrade
20:00	Scoring by quarter: 26–19, 17–18, 13–18, 19–17
	Pts: Walden 13; Rebs: Zagorac 8 Asts: Gordić 4 PIR: Walden 15	Boxscore	Pts: Čović 14; Rebs: Gist, Ojo 7 Asts: Three players 3 PIR: Ojo 15	Arena: Štark Arena; Attendance: 9,268; Referees: Matej Boltauzer, Tomislav Hordov, Mario Majkić

25 November 2019 8	Crvena zvezda mts (Serbia)	105–82	(Montenegro) Mornar	Belgrade
18:00	Scoring by quarter: 28–9, 25–31, 19–20, 33–22
	Pts: Lazić, Ojo 13; Rebs: Ojo 7 Asts: L. Brown, Čović 7 PIR: Ojo 22	Boxscore	Pts: Pullen 22; Rebs: Three players 3 Asts: Needham, Pullen 4 PIR: Pullen 24	Arena: Aleksandar Nikolić Hall; Attendance: 2,357; Referees: Sašo Petek, Uroš Nikolić, Krunoslav Peić

1 December 2019 9	Cedevita Olimpija (Slovenia)	75–64	(Serbia) Crvena zvezda mts	Ljubljana
17:00	Scoring by quarter: 14–16, 21–16, 18–16, 22–16
	Pts: Boatright 17; Rebs: Miller-McIntyre 8 Asts: Three players 3 PIR: Boatright 24	Boxscore	Pts: L. Brown 17; Rebs: D. Brown 5 Asts: L. Brown 5 PIR: L. Brown 18	Arena: Arena Stožice; Attendance: 5,000; Referees: Ilija Belošević, Saša Pukl, Marko Juras

8 December 2019 10	Crvena zvezda mts (Serbia)	95–89(OT)	(Serbia) FMP	Belgrade
18:00	Scoring by quarter: 21–23, 17–18, 17–19, 22–17, Overtime: 18–12
	Pts: L. Brown 25; Rebs: L. Brown 5 Asts: L. Brown 7 PIR: L. Brown 33	Boxscore	Pts: Ulubay 19; Rebs: Three players 5 Asts: Đoković 7 PIR: Ulubay 21	Arena: Aleksandar Nikolić Hall; Attendance: 2,657; Referees: Sreten Radović, Ivan Stefanović, Gordan Terlević

15 December 2019 11	Zadar (Croatia)	78–76	(Serbia) Crvena zvezda mts	Zadar
18:000	Scoring by quarter: 14–20, 29–20, 17–18, 18–18
	Pts: Allen 22; Rebs: Ivanov 11; Asts: Ivanov 5 PIR: Ivanov 20	Boxscore	Pts: Simanić 16; Rebs: Davidovac 7 Asts: Čović 5 PIR: Simanić 21	Arena: Krešimir Ćosić Hall; Attendance: 4,000; Referees: Tomislav Hordov, Uroš Nikolić, Radoš Arsenijević

23 December 2019 12	Koper Primorska (Slovenia)	78–90	(Serbia) Crvena zvezda mts	Koper
18:00	Scoring by quarter: 26–20, 13–29, 24–21, 15–21
	Pts: Marinković 17; Rebs: Barič 5 Asts: Barič 8 PIR: Barič 27	Boxscore	Pts: Davidovac 21; Rebs: Davidovac 9 Asts: L. Brown 6 PIR: Davidovac 25	Arena: Arena Bonifika; Attendance: 2,000; Referees: Uroš Obrknežević, Miloš Koljenšić, Jakub Zamojski

30 December 2019 13	Budućnost VOLI (Montenegro)	20–0	(Serbia) Crvena zvezda mts	Podgorica
18:00
		Boxscore		Arena: Morača Sports Center
Note: The game was not played. Budućnost VOLI won the game by a disciplinary rule.

6 January 2020 14	Crvena zvezda mts (Serbia)	101–77	(Slovenia) Krka	Belgrade
17:00	Scoring by quarter: 25–18, 25–29, 29–16, 22–14
	Pts: Baron 16; Rebs: Jagodić-Kuridža 7 Asts: L. Brown 11; PIR: Baron, L. Brown 21	Boxscore	Pts: Cosey 19; Rebs: Jones 6 Asts: Cosey 6 PIR: Cosey 21	Arena: Aleksandar Nikolić Hall; Attendance: 2,096; Referees: Milivoje Jovčić, Marko Juras, Radoš Savović

13 January 2020 15	Mega Bemax (Serbia)	85–103	(Serbia) Crvena zvezda mts	Belgrade
17:00	Scoring by quarter: 18–20, 25–29, 19–32, 23–22
	Pts: Perry 31; Rebs: Mišković, Simonović 6 Asts: Atić 7 PIR: Perry 27	Boxscore	Pts: Baron, Jenkins 17; Rebs: Štimac 8 Asts: Štimac 5 PIR: Štimac 25	Arena: Ranko Žeravica Sports Hall; Attendance: 2,000; Referees: Uroš Obrknežević, Milan Nedović, Matej Špendl

20 January 2020 16	Crvena zvezda mts (Serbia)	102–80	(Croatia) Cibona	Belgrade
18:00	Scoring by quarter: 31–18, 22–16, 21–25, 28–22
	Pts: Gist 15; Rebs: Gist 6 Asts: L. Brown 14; PIR: L. Brown 27	Boxscore	Pts: Bundović 19; Rebs: Vucić 8 Asts: Gibson, Ramljak 3 PIR: Bundović 21	Arena: Aleksandar Nikolić Hall; Attendance: 1,753; Referees: Ilija Belošević, Radoš Arsenijević, Denis Hadžić

27 January 2020 17	Igokea (Bosnia and Herzegovina)	79–94	(Serbia) Crvena zvezda mts	Laktaši
17:00	Scoring by quarter: 17–22, 20–26, 17–21, 25–25
	Pts: Green, Lešić 16; Rebs: Ilić 8 Asts: Green 7 PIR: Green 17	Boxscore	Pts: Gist 17; Rebs: L. Brown, Jenkins 6 Asts: L. Brown 10; PIR: L. Brown, Gist 20	Arena: Laktaši Sports Hall; Attendance: 3,000; Referees: Miloš Koljenšić, Vladan Šundić, Gordan Terlević

3 February 2020 18	Crvena zvezda mts (Serbia)	92–86	(Serbia) Partizan NIS	Belgrade
18:00	Scoring by quarter: 25–23, 19–19, 23–24, 25–20
	Pts: Baron 26; Rebs: Štimac, Jagodić-Kuridža 6 Asts: L. Brown 8 PIR: Baron 31	Boxscore	Pts: Gordić 14; Rebs: Walden 5 Asts: Gordić 4 PIR: Mosley 18	Arena: Aleksandar Nikolić Hall; Attendance: 5,983; Referees: Sreten Radović, Marko Juras, Uroš Nikolić

10 February 2020 19	Mornar (Montenegro)	71–64	(Serbia) Crvena zvezda mts	Bar
18:00	Scoring by quarter: 20–9, 19–14, 23–15, 9–26
	Pts: Luković 23; Rebs: Needham 8 Asts: Needham 4 PIR: Luković 38	Boxscore	Pts: Punter 22; Rebs: Jagodić-Kuridža 7 Asts: Punter 3 PIR: Punter 16	Arena: Topolica Sport Hall; Attendance: 3,200; Referees: Milivoje Jovčić, Sašo Petek, Josip Radojković

1 March 2020 20	Crvena zvezda mts (Serbia)	88–73	(Slovenia) Cedevita Olimpija	Belgrade
18:00	Scoring by quarter: 28–11, 18–17, 18–20, 24–25
	Pts: Jagodić-Kuridža 18; Rebs: Štimac 8 Asts: L. Brown 4 PIR: Jagodić-Kuridža 19	Boxscore	Pts: Hopkins 18; Rebs: Blažič, Hopkins 8 Asts: Miller-McIntyre 5 PIR: Blažič, Hopkins 16	Arena: Aleksandar Nikolić Hall; Attendance: 4,857; Referees: Ilija Belošević, Tomislav Hordov, Mario Majkić

9 March 2020 21	FMP (Serbia)	79–87	(Serbia) Crvena zvezda mts	Belgrade
18:00	Scoring by quarter: 16–26, 19–30, 19–21, 25–10
	Pts: Đoković 14; Rebs: Reath 7 Asts: Radovanović 4 PIR: Radovanović, Reath 15	Boxscore	Pts: Štimac 17; Rebs: L. Brown, Štimac 4 Asts: L. Brown 4 PIR: Štimac 16	Arena: Železnik Hall; Attendance: 1,200; Referees: Marko Juras, Milan Nedović, Matej Špendl

16 March 2020 22	Crvena zvezda mts (Serbia)	Void	(Croatia) Zadar	Belgrade
18:00
		Boxscore		Arena: Aleksandar Nikolić Hall
Note: Postponed due to the coronavirus pandemic. Canceled on 27 May.

=== EuroLeague ===
==== Regular season ====
Pos	Team	Pld	W	L	PF	PA	PD
12	(Italy) A|X Armani Exchange Milan	28	12	16	2163	2236	−73
13	(Spain) Kirolbet Baskonia	28	12	16	2059	2155	−96
14	(Serbia) Crvena zvezda mts	28	11	17	2079	2108	−29
15	(France) LDLC ASVEL	28	10	18	2073	2284	−211
16	(Germany) ALBA Berlin	28	9	19	2304	2423	−119

Source: EuroLeague
Rules for classification: All points scored in extra period(s) were not counted in the standings, nor for any tie-break situation.

==== Results summary ====
Overall						Home					Away				
Pld	W	L	PF	PA	PD	W	L	PF	PA	PD	W	L	PF	PA	PD
28	11	17	2079	2108	−29	7	8	1147	1111	+36	4	9	932	997	−65

Last updated: March 6, 2020.
Source: Competitive matches

==== Results by round ====
Round	1	2	3	4	5	6	7	8	9	10	11	12	13	14	15	16	17	18	19	20	21	22	23	24	25	26	27	28	29	30	31	32	33	34
Ground	A	H	A	H	A	H	H	H	A	A	H	A	H	A	H	A	H	A	H	H	A	H	H	A	H	A	A	H	A	H	A	H	A	A
Result	L	W	L	L	L	W	L	L	L	W	W	W	L	L	W	W	W	W	L	L	L	L	W	L	L	L	L	W	P	P	P	P	P	P
Position	11	8	9	13	15	13	13	14	16	15	12	10	12	14	12	11	8	8	8	9	10	10	10	10	13	14	14	14	–	–	–	–	–	–

Last updated: May 25, 2020.
Source: Competitive matches
Ground: A = Away; H = Home; R = Rest. Result: L = Loss; W = Win; R = Rest; P = Postponed.

Win Loss Void

==== Matches ====
3 October 2019 1	Panathinaikos OPAP (Greece)	87–82	(Serbia) Crvena zvezda mts	Athens
20:00 (CET)	Scoring by quarter: 14–17, 23–18, 29–18, 21–29
	Pts: Calathes 21; Rebs: Thomas 11; Asts: Calathes 7 PIR: Thomas 25	Boxscore	Pts: Gist 22; Rebs: Gist 7 Asts: Baron 6 PIR: Baron, Gist 17	Arena: Olympic Sports Center Athens; Attendance: 10,133; Referees: Juan Carlos Garcia, Emin Mogulkoc, Gytis Vilius

10 October 2019 2	Crvena zvezda mts (Serbia)	68–56	(Turkey) Fenerbahçe Beko	Belgrade
19:00 (CET)	Scoring by quarter: 15–16, 20–14, 16–13, 17–13
	Pts: L. Brown 13; Rebs: D. Brown, Gist 8 Asts: L. Brown 6 PIR: L. Brown 17	Boxscore	Pts: de Colo 19; Rebs: Williams 7 Asts: de Colo 4 PIR: de Colo 19	Arena: Štark Arena; Attendance: 16,879; Referees: Luigi Lamonica, Piotr Pastusiak, Rain Peerandi

17 October 2019 3	Maccabi Tel Aviv (Israel)	84–69(OT)	(Serbia) Crvena zvezda mts	Tel Aviv
21:05 (EET)	Scoring by quarter: 24–13, 15–17, 16–17, 12–20, Overtime: 17–2
	Pts: Wilbekin 16; Rebs: Casspi 8 Asts: Zoosman 4 PIR: Casspi 24	Boxscore	Pts: Perperoglou 18; Rebs: Faye, Ojo 6 Asts: Čović, Jenkins 4 PIR: Perperoglou 16	Arena: Menora Mivtachim Arena; Attendance: 10,823; Referees: Borys Ryzhyk, Robert Vyklicky, Sinan Isguder

24 October 2019 4	Crvena zvezda mts (Serbia)	65–73	(Spain) Barcelona	Belgrade
21:00 (CET)	Scoring by quarter: 16–12, 20–21, 13–24, 16–16
	Pts: Gist 10; Rebs: three players 4 Asts: L. Brown 3 PIR: Faye 10	Boxscore	Pts: Mirotić 21; Rebs: Davies, Mirotić 6 Asts: Higgins 5 PIR: Davies 24	Arena: Aleksandar Nikolić Hall; Attendance: 6,384; Referees: Oļegs Latiševs, Joseph Bissang, Marcin Kowalski

29 October 2019 5	Anadolu Efes (Turkey)	85–70	(Serbia) Crvena zvezda mts	Istanbul
20:30 (FET)	Scoring by quarter: 21–9, 17–17, 18–25, 29–19
	Pts: Micić 26; Rebs: Peters 7 Asts: Simon, Micić 5 PIR: Micić 29	Boxscore	Pts: L. Brown 18; Rebs: Gist 7 Asts: L. Brown 5 PIR: L. Brown 19	Arena: Sinan Erdem Dome; Attendance: 12,466; Referees: Robert Lottermoser, Jakub Zamojski, Petros Paparetrou

31 October 2019 6	Crvena zvezda mts (Serbia)	90–78	(Russia) Khimki	Belgrade
19:00 (CET)	Scoring by quarter: 28–22, 22–19, 30–15, 10–22
	Pts: Simanić 18; Rebs: Three players 5 Asts: L. Brown 7 PIR: Three players 17	Boxscore	Pts: Shved 14; Rebs: Gill 11; Asts: Karasev, Shved 4 PIR: Gill 25	Arena: Aleksandar Nikolić Hall; Attendance: 5,432; Referees: Fernando Rocha, Emilio Perez, Michele Rossi

7 November 2019 7	Crvena zvezda mts (Serbia)	60–75	(Spain) Real Madrid	Belgrade
19:00 (CET)	Scoring by quarter: 9–12, 18–21, 25–16, 8–26
	Pts: Baron 17; Rebs: L. Brown 6 Asts: L. Brown 5 PIR: L. Brown 24	Boxscore	Pts: Llull 16; Rebs: Tavares 9 Asts: Llull 5 PIR: Tavares 21	Arena: Štark Arena; Attendance: 16,457; Referees: Carmelo Paternicò, Emin Moğulkoç, Gytis Vilius

15 November 2019 8	Crvena zvezda mts (Serbia)	72–74(OT)	(France) LDLC ASVEL	Belgrade
19:00 (CET)	Scoring by quarter: 16–14, 20–18, 18–15, 11–18, Overtime: 7–9
	Pts: Baron 16; Rebs: Davidovac, Gist 7 Asts: L. Brown 4 PIR: Davidovac 19	Boxscore	Pts: Jean-Charles 20; Rebs: Jekiri 19; Asts: Lighty 6 PIR: Jekiri 29	Arena: Štark Arena; Attendance: 10,894; Referees: Juan Carlos García González, Piotr Pastusiak, Rain Peerandi

19 November 2019 9	ALBA Berlin (Germany)	93–80	(Serbia) Crvena zvezda mts	Berlin
20:00 (CET)	Scoring by quarter: 21–15, 25–19, 21–20, 26–26
	Pts: Giedraitis 22; Rebs: Sikma 9 Asts: Hermannsson, Sikma 4 PIR: Sikma 32	Boxscore	Pts: Ojo 12; Rebs: Jovanović, Ojo 6 Asts: Čović 8 PIR: Čović, Ojo 16	Arena: Mercedes-Benz Arena; Attendance: 8,076; Referees: Borys Ryzhyk, Aare Halliko, Sebastien Clivaz

21 November 2019 10	Žalgiris (Lithuania)	59–61	(Serbia) Crvena zvezda mts	Kaunas
20:00 (EET)	Scoring by quarter: 21–16, 10–17, 15–14, 13–14
	Pts: Grigonis, Ulanovas 11; Rebs: Jankūnas 7 Asts: Walkup 4 PIR: Ulanovas 15	Boxscore	Pts: Baron 14; Rebs: Faye 7 Asts: L. Brown 3 PIR: L. Brown 19	Arena: Žalgirio Arena; Attendance: 14,033 (tentative); Referees: Daniel Hierrezuelo, Anne Panther, Robert Vyklický

28 November 2019 11	Crvena zvezda mts (Serbia)	76–73	(Spain) Valencia Basket	Belgrade
19:00 (CET)	Scoring by quarter: 17–19, 20–22, 23–10, 16–22
	Pts: L. Brown 19; Rebs: Faye 8 Asts: L. Brown 6 PIR: L. Brown 21	Boxscore	Pts: Dubljević 22; Rebs: Dubljević 8 Asts: Three players 3 PIR: Dubljević 29	Arena: Aleksandar Nikolić Hall; Attendance: 6,087; Referees: Spiros Gkontas, Petri Mantyla, Jakub Zamojski

5 December 2019 12	AX Armani Exchange Milan (Italy)	67–77	(Serbia) Crvena zvezda mts	Milan
20:45 (CET)	Scoring by quarter: 18–20, 22–19, 10–18, 17–20
	Pts: Rodríguez 14; Rebs: Brooks 7 Asts: Rodríguez, Scola 3 PIR: Rodríguez 16	Boxscore	Pts: L. Brown 21; Rebs: Faye, Gist 6 Asts: L. Brown 7 PIR: L. Brown 29	Arena: Mediolanum Forum; Attendance: 8,680; Referees: Robert Lottermoser, Sergio Silva, Marcin Kowalski

12 December 2019 13	Crvena zvezda mts (Serbia)	64–72	(Spain) Kirolbet Baskonia	Belgrade
19:00 (CET)	Scoring by quarter: 14–20, 17–12, 12–24, 21–16
	Pts: L. Brown 20; Rebs: Kuzmić 8 Asts: L. Brown 5 PIR: L. Brown 22	Boxscore	Pts: Stauskas 22; Rebs: Shengelia 8 Asts: Vildoza 4 PIR: Stauskas 22	Arena: Štark Arena; Attendance: 10,367; Referees: Fernando Rocha, Jurgis Laurinavicius, Amit Balak

18 December 2019 14	CSKA Moscow (Russia)	100–74	(Serbia) Crvena zvezda mts	Moscow
20:00 (FET)	Scoring by quarter: 26–21, 26–23, 24–18, 24–12
	Pts: James 29; Rebs: Vorontsevich 6 Asts: Baker 5 PIR: James 32	Boxscore	Pts: Davidovac 17; Rebs: Kuzmić 6 Asts: Čović 9 PIR: Davidovac 14	Arena: Megasport Arena; Attendance: 6011; Referees: Miguel Angel Perez, Seffi Shemmesh, Sebastien Clivaz

20 December 2019 15	Crvena zvezda mts (Serbia)	88–81	(Greece) Olympiacos	Belgrade
19:00 (CET)	Scoring by quarter: 16–21, 24–29, 23–11, 25–20
	Pts: L. Brown 34; Rebs: Gist 7 Asts: L. Brown, Jenkins 4 PIR: L. Brown 32	Boxscore	Pts: Paul 21; Rebs: Milutinov 11; Asts: Rochestie 5 PIR: Milutinov 34	Arena: Štark Arena; Attendance: 8,076; Referees: Daniel Hierrezuelo, Joseph Bissang, Rain Peerandi

27 December 2019 16	Zenit Saint Petersburg (Russia)	58–65	(Serbia) Crvena zvezda mts	Kazan
20:00 (FET)	Scoring by quarter: 16–20, 24–17, 7–14, 11–14
	Pts: Hollins 14; Rebs: Ayón, Iverson 6 Asts: Renfroe 4 PIR: Iverson 14	Boxscore	Pts: Baron 26; Rebs: L. Brown 9 Asts: L. Brown 6 PIR: Baron 34	Arena: Basket-Hall Kazan; Attendance: 3,020; Referees: Christos Christodolou, Piotr Pastusiak, Aare Halliko

2 January 2020 17	Crvena zvezda mts (Serbia)	93–63	(Germany) Bayern Munich	Belgrade
19:00 (CET)	Scoring by quarter: 25–13, 28–18, 18–15, 22–17
	Pts: L. Brown, Punter 15; Rebs: Kuzmić 7 Asts: L. Brown 7 PIR: L. Brown 26	Boxscore	Pts: Monroe 20; Rebs: Radošević, Zipser 6 Asts: Lô, Monroe 3 PIR: Monroe 28	Arena: Štark Arena; Attendance: 16,824; Referees: Carmelo Paternico, Emilio Perez, Ingus Baumanis

10 January 2020 18	LDLC ASVEL (France)	80–83	(Serbia) Crvena zvezda mts	Villeurbanne
20:45 (CET)	Scoring by quarter: 30–13, 19–17, 16–34, 15–19
	Pts: Payne 17; Rebs: Payne 8 Asts: Strazel 4 PIR: Payne 26	Boxscore	Pts: Štimac 21; Rebs: Gist 6 Asts: L. Brown 7 PIR: Štimac 23	Arena: Astroballe; Attendance: 5,560; Referees: Carlos Peruga, Sérgio Silva, Gytis Vilius

15 January 2020 19	Crvena zvezda mts (Serbia)	70–76	(Lithuania) Žalgiris	Belgrade
19:00 (CET)	Scoring by quarter: 20–22, 18–16, 15–19, 17–19
	Pts: L. Brown 14; Rebs: Kuzmić 8 Asts: L. Brown 6 PIR: Kuzmić 20	Boxscore	Pts: Lekavičius 17; Rebs: Landale 9 Asts: Landale 4 PIR: Lekavičius 22	Arena: Štark Arena; Attendance: 15,874; Referees: Borys Ryzhyk, Fernando Rocha, Spiros Gkontas

17 January 2020 20	Crvena zvezda mts (Serbia)	85–94(OT)	(Germany) ALBA Berlin	Belgrade
19:00 (CET)	Scoring by quarter: 22–21, 21–18, 19–23, 17–17, Overtime: 6–15
	Pts: Punter 24; Rebs: Štimac 6 Asts: Baron, L. Brown 3 PIR: Punter 26	Boxscore	Pts: Sikma, Siva 15; Rebs: Sikma 10; Asts: Sikma 4 PIR: Sikma 25	Arena: Štark Arena; Attendance: 14,376; Referees: Christos Christodoulou, Marcin Kowalski, Jurgis Laurinavičius

23 January 2020 21	Barcelona (Spain)	86–82	(Serbia) Crvena zvezda mts	Barcelona
21:00 (CET)	Scoring by quarter: 29–19, 12–23, 21–24, 24–16
	Pts: Mirotić 25; Rebs: Mirotić 6 Asts: Delaney 5 PIR: Mirotić 25	Boxscore	Pts: L. Brown 15; Rebs: Gist 6 Asts: L. Brown 8 PIR: L. Brown 19	Arena: Palau Blaugrana; Attendance: 5,427; Referees: Olegs Latisevs, Piotr Pastusiak, Seffi Shemmesh

31 January 2020 22	Crvena zvezda mts (Serbia)	78–85	(Turkey) Anadolu Efes	Belgrade
19:00 (CET)	Scoring by quarter: 16–24, 14–27, 28–21, 20–13
	Pts: Davidovac 15; Rebs: Štimac 9 Asts: L. Brown 9 PIR: Štimac 18	Boxscore	Pts: Larkin 24; Rebs: Pleiss 8 Asts: Micić 5 PIR: Larkin 23	Arena: Štark Arena; Attendance: 14,820; Referees: Juan Carlos García González, Carmelo Paternicò, Robert Vyklický

5 February 2020 23	Crvena zvezda mts (Serbia)	78–73	(Greece) Panathinaikos OPAP	Belgrade
19:00 (CET)	Scoring by quarter: 9–21, 26–11, 11–25, 32–16
	Pts: Punter 24; Rebs: Ojo 7 Asts: Jenkins 5 PIR: Punter 28	Boxscore	Pts: Papagiannis, Thomas 12; Rebs: Mitoglou 10; Asts: Calathes 5 PIR: Mitoglou 17	Arena: Štark Arena; Attendance: 12,867; Referees: Miguel Ángel Pérez Pérez, Mehdi Difallah, Eduard Udyanskyy

7 February 2020 24	Khimki (Russia)	78–72	(Serbia) Crvena zvezda mts	Khimki
18:00 (FET)	Scoring by quarter: 28–18, 20–18, 16–15, 14–21
	Pts: Shved 22; Rebs: Jerebko 8 Asts: Shved 9 PIR: Shved 23	Boxscore	Pts: Punter 20; Rebs: Davidovac 7 Asts: Dobrić 4 PIR: Dobrić 17	Arena: Mytishchi Arena; Attendance: 5,629; Referees: Fernando Rocha, Emin Mogulkoc, Carlos Peruga

21 February 2020 25	Crvena zvezda mts (Serbia)	81–86	(Russia) CSKA Moscow	Belgrade
19:00 (CET)	Scoring by quarter: 17–16, 20–20, 16–24, 28–26
	Pts: Baron 15; Rebs: Ojo 5 Asts: L. Brown, Gist 4 PIR: Gist 18	Boxscore	Pts: James 29; Rebs: Hines 10; Asts: James, Voigtmann 3 PIR: James 21	Arena: Štark Arena; Attendance: 13,457; Referees: Emilio Perez, Jakub Zamojski, Mykola Ambrosov

27 February 2020 26	Kirolbet Baskonia (Spain)	71–56	(Serbia) Crvena zvezda mts	Vitoria-Gasteiz
21:00 (CET)	Scoring by quarter: 21–15, 18–13, 15–15, 17–13
	Pts: Shengelia 18; Rebs: Shields 6 Asts: Shields 5 PIR: Shields 23	Boxscore	Pts: Štimac 13; Rebs: Štimac 7 Asts: Baron 4 PIR: Štimac 16	Arena: Fernando Buesa Arena; Attendance: 9,245; Referees: Luigi Lamonica, Anne Panther, Marcin Kowalski

4 March 2020 27	Fenerbahçe Beko (Turkey)	66–63	(Serbia) Crvena zvezda mts	Istanbul
18:45 (CET)	Scoring by quarter: 22–20, 19–17, 10–14, 15–12
	Pts: Kalinić 10; Rebs: Thomas, Williams 6 Asts: Westermann 4 PIR: Williams 19	Boxscore	Pts: L. Brown, Punter 14; Rebs: Štimac 7 Asts: L. Brown 3 PIR: L. Brown 15	Arena: Ülker Sports and Event Hall; Attendance: 7,315; Referees: Juan Carlos Garcia, Spiros Gkontas, Gytis Vilius

6 March 2020 28	Crvena zvezda mts (Serbia)	92–76	(Israel) Maccabi Tel Aviv	Belgrade
19:00 (CET)	Scoring by quarter: 27–20, 22–23, 30–15, 13–18
	Pts: Baron, Punter 22; Rebs: Štimac 12; Asts: L. Brown 9 PIR: Baron 26	Boxscore	Pts: Dorsey 19; Rebs: Reynolds 10; Asts: Wilbekin 4 PIR: Wilbekin 16	Arena: Štark Arena; Attendance: 7,369; Referees: Carmelo Paternico, Robert Vyklicky, Jordi Aliaga

12 March 2020 29	Real Madrid (Spain)	Void	(Serbia) Crvena zvezda mts	Madrid
21:00 (CET)
		Boxscore		Arena: WiZink Center
Note: Postponed due to the coronavirus pandemic. Canceled on 25 May.

20 March 2020 30	Crvena zvezda mts (Serbia)	Void	(Italy) AX Armani Exchange Milan	Belgrade
19:00 (CET)
		Boxscore		Arena: Štark Arena
Note: Postponed due to the coronavirus pandemic. Canceled on 25 May.

24 March 2020 31	Olympiacos (Greece)	Void	(Serbia) Crvena zvezda mts	Piraeus
20:00 (EET)
		Boxscore		Arena: Peace and Friendship Stadium
Note: Postponed due to the coronavirus pandemic. Canceled on 25 May.

27 March 2020 32	Crvena zvezda mts (Serbia)	Void	(Russia) Zenit Saint Petersburg	Belgrade
19:00 (CET)
		Boxscore		Arena: Aleksandar Nikolić Hall
Note: Postponed due to the coronavirus pandemic. Canceled on 25 May.

3 April 2020 33	Bayern Munich (Germany)	Void	(Serbia) Crvena zvezda mts	Munich
20:30 (CET)
		Boxscore		Arena: Audi Dome
Note: Postponed due to the coronavirus pandemic. Canceled on 25 May.

9 April 2020 34	Valencia Basket (Spain)	Void	(Serbia) Crvena zvezda mts	Valencia
21:00 (CET)
		Boxscore		Arena: Fuente de San Luis
Note: Postponed due to the coronavirus pandemic. Canceled on 25 May.

=== Serbian Super League ===
The 2019–20 Basketball League of Serbia was the 14th season of the Serbian highest professional basketball league and the Super League, as the second part of the season. The Zvezda is the defending champions. The season was suspended prior to its start due to the COVID-19 pandemic. On 28 May, the Serbian League Assembly canceled definitely the 2019–20 season due to the COVID-19 pandemic.

=== Radivoj Korać Cup ===
The 2020 Radivoj Korać Cup is the 14th season of the Serbian cup tournament held within February 2020.

Win Loss

All times are local UTC+1.

13 February 2020 Quarterfinals	Crvena zvezda mts	107–67	Radnički Beograd	Niš
17:00	Scoring by quarter: 25–28, 35–14, 24–13, 23–12
Arena Sport	Pts: Punter 23; Rebs: Gist 8 Asts: three players 4 PIR: Punter 31	Boxscore	Pts: Valjarević 16; Rebs: Dunđerski 4 Asts: Dunđerski 11; PIR: Dunđerski 20	Arena: Čair Sports Center; Attendance: 4,500; Referees: Siniša Prpa, Nemanja Ninković, Stefan Ćalić

15 February 2020 Semifinals	Mega Bemax	79–80	Crvena zvezda mts	Niš
17:00	Scoring by quarter: 24–17, 9–23, 27–18, 19–22
Arena Sport	Pts: Perry 20; Rebs: Simonović 11; Asts: Perry 9 PIR: Perry 35	Boxscore	Pts: Punter 22; Rebs: Gist, Štimac 7 Asts: Brown 3 PIR: Punter 25	Arena: Čair Sports Center; Attendance: 4,000; Referees: Milivoje Jovčić, Saša Maričić, Vladimir Jevtović

16 February 2020 Final	Crvena zvezda mts	84–85(OT)	Partizan NIS	Niš
21:00	Scoring by quarter: 13–19, 18–15, 18–18, 29–26, Overtime: 6–7
Arena Sport	Pts: Brown 17; Rebs: Štimac 10; Asts: Brown 7 PIR: Štimac 17	Boxscore	Pts: Paige 21; Rebs: Zagorac 6 Asts: Walden 5 PIR: Jaramaz 22	Arena: Čair Sports Center; Attendance: 5,000; Referees: Ilija Belošević, Milivoje Jovčić, Uroš Nikolić

In the semifinal game, American guard Billy Baron scored the 3-point buzzer-beater for an 80–79 win over Mega Bemax.

=== Adriatic Supercup ===
The 2019 Adriatic Supercup was the 3rd season of the Adriatic cup tournament held in September 2019 in Zagreb, Croatia. The Zvezda was the defending champions, but was eliminated in quarterfinals by Koper Primorska.

Win Loss

26 September 2019 Quarterfinals	Crvena zvezda mts (Serbia)	82–88	(Slovenia) Koper Primorska	Zagreb
20:00	Scoring by quarter: 26–25, 15–21, 21–23, 20–19
Arena Sport	Pts: Davidovac 15; Rebs: Gist 6 Asts: Čović 5 PIR: Gist 21	Boxscore	Pts: Jagodić-Kuridža 18; Rebs: Jagodić-Kuridža 9 Asts: Šiško 7 PIR: Jagodić-Kuridža 27	Arena: Dražen Petrović Basketball Hall; Attendance: 800; Referees: Miloš Koljenšić, Dragan Porobić, Krunoslav Peić

== Individual awards ==
=== Adriatic League ===
MVP of the Round

Round	Player	PIR
1	(United States) Lorenzo Brown	30
6	(United States) Billy Baron	27
10	(United States) Lorenzo Brown	33

Source: ABA League

== Statistics ==
Legend
GP	Games played	GS	Games started	MPG	Minutes per game
FG%	Field-goal percentage	3FG%	3-point field-goal percentage	FT%	Free-throw percentage
RPG	Rebounds per game	APG	Assists per game	SPG	Steals per game
BPG	Blocks per game	PPG	Points per game	PIR	PIR per game

Player	Left during season

=== Adriatic League ===
Player	GP	GS	MPG	2FG%	3FG%	FT%	RPG	APG	SPG	BPG	PPG	PIR
Billy Baron	18	18	23:20	.559	.430	.784	2.4	2.4	0.8	0	12.4	12.7
Lorenzo Brown	18	17	20:50	.590	.313	.917	2.7	6.3	1.4	0.4	10.6	14.9
Dejan Davidovac	17	1	16:21	.541	.358	.767	2.6	1	0.9	0.3	7.6	9.3
Ognjen Dobrić	16	2	16:19	.565	.345	.818	2.2	0.6	0.8	0.3	6.3	6.5
James Gist	17	5	17:35	.593	.455	.723	4.2	1.6	0.7	0.5	11.1	12.1
Marko Jagodić-Kuridža	5	2	18:00	.529	.667	.714	5	1.4	0	0.4	5.8	8.2
Charles Jenkins	18	3	18:34	.667	.528	.750	2.1	1.8	0.8	0.2	6.4	7
Nikola Jovanović	7	0	7:43	.471	.000	.714	1.9	0.9	0.3	0	3.7	3.7
Branko Lazić	17	17	18:53	.789	.439	.905	1.5	0.6	1.1	0	6.1	6.5
Kalin Lucas	2	0	15:30	.250	.000	1.000	1.5	2	0.5	0	2	2.5
Michael Ojo	17	1	11:11	.596	.000	.833	3.4	0.5	0.4	0.6	6.4	7.8
Stratos Perperoglou	8	0	14:15	.407	.409	.923	2.4	0.9	0.9	0	7.6	6.8
Kevin Punter	8	0	18:38	.459	.360	.929	1.4	1.8	0.9	0.1	10.9	9.8
Boriša Simanić	16	12	14:49	.529	.485	.846	2	1.1	0.3	0.5	5.9	5.9
Vladimir Štimac	8	2	17:53	.648	.000	.500	4.9	1.8	0.3	0.5	10.4	14
Derrick Brown	5	3	17:00	.526	.000	.600	2.8	0.6	0.8	0.2	5.2	3.4
Filip Čović	11	2	19:16	.524	.364	.909	1.7	4.2	0.7	0	7.1	8.6
Mouhammad Faye	10	1	13:06	.545	.294	.750	3.3	0.9	0.7	0.4	4.5	5.4
Ognjen Kuzmić	15	14	10:56	.510	.000	.733	3.2	0.5	0.3	0.3	4.2	5.5
Nemanja Nenadić	1	0	9:00	.500	.000	.667	0	1	1	0	4	5

Last updated: March 9, 2020.
Source: Adriatic League

=== EuroLeague ===
Player	GP	GS	MPG	2FG%	3FG%	FT%	RPG	APG	SPG	BPG	PPG	PIR
Billy Baron	26	25	24:36	.443	.403	.855	2.7	2.2	0.8	0.0	11.6	11.0
Lorenzo Brown	27	27	25:15	.459	.288	.823	3.3	4.6	1.1	0.4	12.3	13.0
Dejan Davidovac	24	4	18:46	.540	.326	.795	2.9	0.6	0.8	0.3	6.2	7.3
Ognjen Dobrić	22	3	14:36	.563	.357	.684	1.7	0.9	0.8	0.1	5.1	5.3
James Gist	25	7	20:15	.444	.211	.593	4.4	1.3	0.7	0.4	7.0	6.7
Marko Jagodić-Kuridža	8	3	17:25	.500	.125	.500	2.9	1.0	0.0	0.8	3.9	4.3
Charles Jenkins	23	0	18:40	.509	.074	.941	2.2	1.8	0.8	0.2	3.4	3.4
Nikola Jovanović	6	0	6:57	.375	.000	.600	1.8	0.2	0.0	0.0	2.0	1.0
Branko Lazić	25	25	16:14	.521	.292	.667	1.3	0.6	0.6	0.0	3.9	1.8
Kalin Lucas	3	0	12:58	.400	.000	.000	0.3	3.0	0.3	0.0	1.3	2.3
Michael Ojo	22	3	11:26	.622	.000	.761	3.0	0.3	0.8	0.2	4.1	5.0
Stratos Perperoglou	13	0	16:30	.400	.357	.727	2.6	0.5	0.5	0.0	7.8	5.2
Kevin Punter	12	0	22:04	.474	.481	.894	1.1	1.5	0.6	0.1	15.9	13.7
Boriša Simanić	20	18	12:40	.625	.516	.500	1.2	0.6	0.3	0.5	4.0	3.2
Vladimir Štimac	13	4	22:54	.596	.375	.659	6.2	1.1	0.5	0.5	11.1	14.0
Derrick Brown	6	3	14:23	.381	.571	.667	3.2	0.7	0.2	0.0	6.0	5.3
Filip Čović	13	1	14:04	.143	.259	.714	0.9	2.5	0.2	0.0	2.3	2.1
Mouhammad Faye	12	1	18:14	.316	.333	.833	3.8	0.6	0.3	0.6	4.5	5.3
Ognjen Kuzmić	19	16	12:55	.620	.000	.813	3.5	0.6	0.2	0.2	3.9	5.4
Nemanja Nenadić	1	0	2:53	.000	.000	.500	0.0	0.0	0.0	0.0	1.0	-3.0

Last updated: March 6, 2020.
Source: EuroLeague

=== Radivoj Korać Cup ===
Player	GP	GS	MPG	2FG%	3FG%	FT%	RPG	APG	SPG	BPG	PPG	PIR
Billy Baron	3	3	27:25	.625	.467	1.000	3.3	2.3	0.7	0.0	12.3	12.3
Lorenzo Brown	3	2	15:32	.385	.273	.500	1.0	3.7	0.3	0.0	6.7	1.0
Dejan Davidovac	3	0	22:55	.500	.385	.917	2.7	2.0	1.0	0.0	11.3	11.0
Ognjen Dobrić	2	0	13:21	.000	.750	.000	1.0	1.5	1.0	0.0	4.5	5.5
James Gist	3	0	21:17	.500	.000	.667	6.7	0.7	1.0	1.0	10.0	13.0
Marko Jagodić-Kuridža	3	2	17:07	.400	.000	.833	3.3	0.7	0.0	0.0	4.3	5.3
Charles Jenkins	3	1	19:28	.800	.333	.000	2.0	2.0	1.0	0.0	3.7	5.3
Nikola Jovanović	Did not play											
Branko Lazić	3	3	18:08	.500	.333	.000	0.7	1.3	0.3	0.0	2.3	-0.3
Kalin Lucas	Not added to the roster											
Michael Ojo	3	2	6:41	.667	.000	.750	2.3	0.0	0.0	0.0	2.3	4.0
Stratos Perperoglou	Not added to the roster											
Kevin Punter	3	0	21:11	.545	.333	1.000	3.3	2.0	1.7	0.3	19.0	21.7
Boriša Simanić	2	1	11:56	.750	.200	.000	2.0	1.0	2.0	0.5	4.5	6.0
Vladimir Štimac	3	1	21:46	.682	.000	.875	8.3	0.0	1.0	0.7	12.3	18.7

Last updated: February 16, 2020.
Source: KSS

=== ABA Super Cup ===
Player	GP	GS	MPG	2FG%	3FG%	FT%	RPG	APG	SPG	BPG	PPG	PIR
Billy Baron	1	1	22:03	.000	.667	1.000	0.0	0.0	0.0	0.0	10.0	9.0
Derrick Brown	1	1	29:26	.600	.000	.400	2.0	1.0	0.0	0.0	8.0	6.0
Lorenzo Brown	1	1	19:52	.333	.500	.000	2.0	3.0	1.0	0.0	9.0	4.0
Filip Čović	1	0	19:56	.500	.000	.875	1.0	5.0	0.0	0.0	9.0	14.0
Dejan Davidovac	1	1	22:49	1.000	.400	.833	3.0	2.0	1.0	0.0	15.0	20.0
Ognjen Dobrić	1	0	9:30	.000	1.000	.000	0.0	0.0	2.0	0.0	3.0	2.0
Mouhammad Faye	Did not play											
James Gist	1	1	28:38	.571	.000	.667	6.0	2.0	3.0	3.0	12.0	21.0
Charles Jenkins	1	0	15:49	.000	.000	1.000	1.0	0.0	1.0	0.0	2.0	–1.0
Nikola Jovanović	Did not play											
Ognjen Kuzmić	Did not play											
Branko Lazić	Did not play											
Nemanja Nenadić	Did not play											
Michael Ojo	1	0	11:22	.000	.000	.667	4.0	0.0	0.0	0.0	4.0	3.0
Stratos Perperoglou	1	0	15:10	.250	.500	.500	1.0	0.0	0.0	0.0	8.0	4.0
Boriša Simanić	1	0	5:25	1.000	.000	.000	1.0	0.0	0.0	0.0	2.0	1.0

Last updated: September 26, 2019.
Source: ABA League

=== Head coaches records ===
Head Coach	Competition	G	W	L	PF	PA	PD	Win %
Milan Tomić	Adriatic League	3	1	2	248	232	+16	.333
Milan Tomić	Adriatic Supercup	1	0	1	82	86	–6	.000
Milan Tomić	EuroLeague	3	1	2	217	210	+7	.333
Milan Tomić	Total	7	2	5	547	528	+17	.286
Andrija Gavrilović	Adriatic League	4	3	1	349	278	+71	.750
Andrija Gavrilović	EuroLeague	7	2	5	491	528	–37	.286
Andrija Gavrilović	Total	11	5	6	840	806	+34	.455
Dragan Šakota	Adriatic League	14	10	4	1161	1052	+109	.714
Dragan Šakota	EuroLeague	18	8	10	1371	1370	+1	.444
Dragan Šakota	Radivoj Korać Cup	3	2	1	271	231	+40	.667
Dragan Šakota	Total	35	20	15	2803	2653	+150	.571

Updated: March 9, 2020

== See also ==
- 2019–20 Red Star Belgrade season
- 2019–20 KK Partizan season
- 2019–20 KK Cedevita Olimpija season
