= Stratos Perperoglou =

Greek basketball player

Stratos Perperoglou Στράτος Περπέρογλου
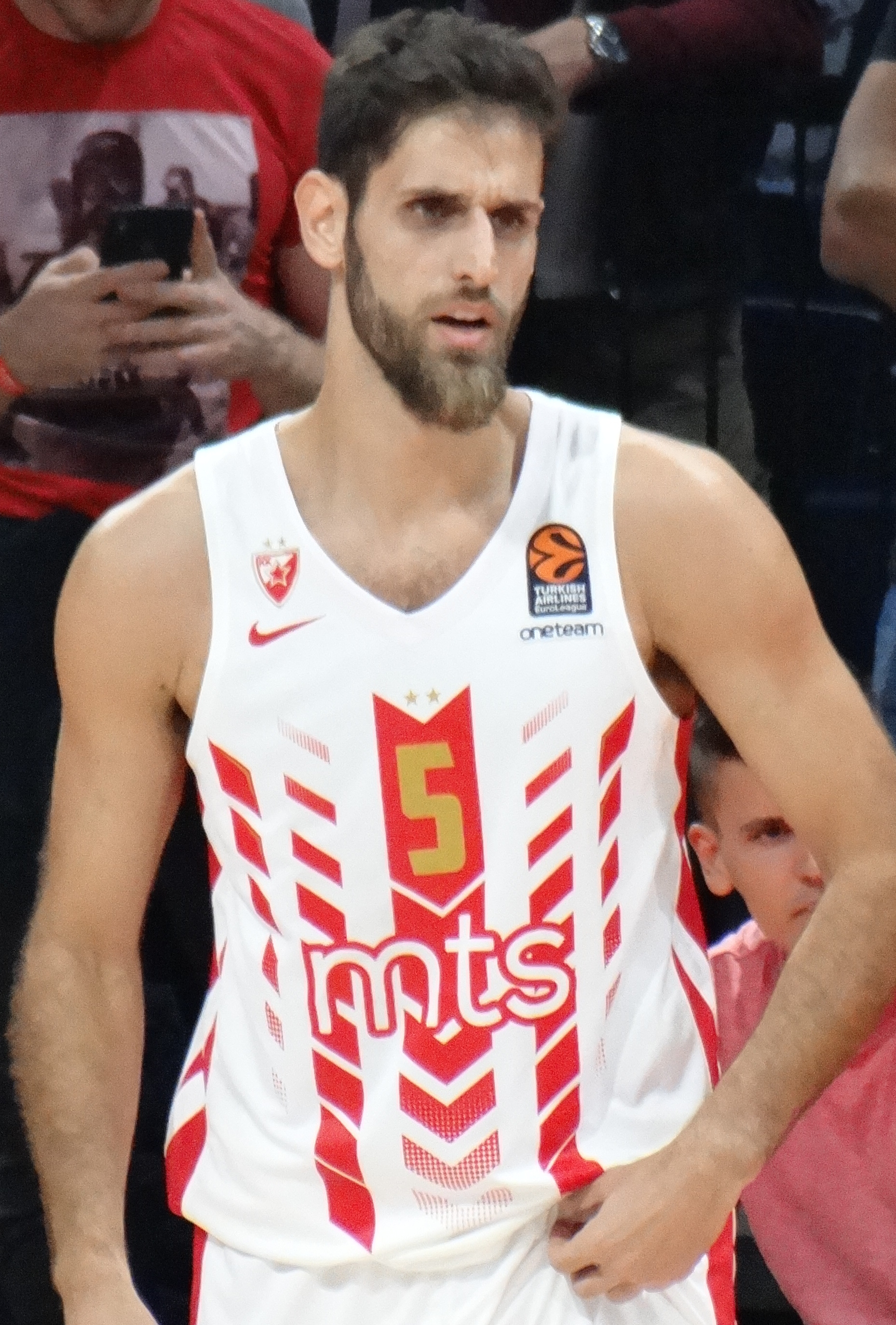
- Perperoglou warming up with Crvena zvezda, in 2019.

Personal information
- Born: 7 August 1984 (age 42) Drama, Greece
- Listed height: 6 ft 8 in (2.03 m)
- Listed weight: 230 lb (104 kg)

Career information
- NBA draft: 2006: undrafted
- Playing career: 2002–2020
- Position: Small forward
- Number: 5, 7, 8, 33

Career history
- 2002–2004: Ilysiakos
- 2004–2007: Panionios
- 2007–2012: Panathinaikos
- 2012–2014: Olympiacos
- 2014–2015: Anadolu Efes
- 2015–2017: FC Barcelona
- 2017–2018: Hapoel Jerusalem
- 2018–2020: Crvena zvezda

Career highlights
- FIBA Intercontinental Cup champion (2013); 3× EuroLeague champion (2009, 2011, 2013); Triple Crown winner (2009); ABA League champion (2019); Serbian League champion (2019); ABA League Supercup winner (2018); All-ABA League Team (2019); 4× Greek League champion (2008–2011); 3× Greek Cup winner (2008, 2009, 2012); All-Greek League Team (2007); 6× Greek All-Star (2007–2011, 2014); Turkish Cup winner (2015); Spanish Supercup winner (2015)
Medals
Men's basketball
Representing Greece
EuroBasket
Bronze medal – third place	2009 Poland	{{{2}}}
FIBA U-19 World Cup
Bronze medal – third place	2003 Greece	Under-19
FIBA Europe U-18 Championship
Bronze medal – third place	2002 Germany	Under-18

Efstratios "Stratos" Perperoglou (Greek: Στράτος Περπέρογλου; born August 7, 1984) is a Greek former professional basketball player. He is 2.03 m (6 ft 8 in) tall and he played mainly at the small forward position.

== Professional career ==
Perperoglou began his playing career with the youth clubs of AO Kavalas and Iviskos. He started his professional career with Ilysiakos in 2002, and then he moved to Panionios in 2004. In 2007, he transferred from Panionios to the big Greek EuroLeague club Panathinaikos.

With Panathinaikos, Perperoglou won 4 Greek League championships (2008, 2009, 2010, 2011) and 3 Greek Cups (2008, 2009, 2012). He also won 2 EuroLeague titles (2009, 2011), and the Triple Crown with Panathinaikos, in 2009.

In August 2012, he signed a two-year contract with Olympiacos. With Olympiacos, he won the 2012–13 season championship of the EuroLeague. He also won the 2013 edition of the FIBA Intercontinental Cup.

On 18 June 2014 he signed a two-year deal with Anadolu Efes. On 23 July 2015 he left Efes and signed a two-year deal with FC Barcelona Lassa.

On 21 September 2017 he signed with Israeli club Hapoel Jerusalem for the 2017–18 season.

On 3 August 2018 Perperoglou moved to Serbia and signed for Crvena zvezda for the 2018–19 season. Also, he played the 2019–20 season for the Zvezda.

In July 2021, Perperoglou announced his retirement from his basketball career at age 36.

== National team career ==
=== Greece junior national team ===
Perperoglou won bronze medals with Greece junior national teams at both the 2002 FIBA Europe Under-18 Championship and the 2003 FIBA Under-19 World Cup. He also played at the 2004 FIBA Europe Under-20 Championship.

=== Greece men's national team ===
Perperoglou has also played with the Greece men's national basketball team, and they won the bronze medal at the 2009 EuroBasket. He also represented Greece at the 2010 FIBA World Championship, the 2013 EuroBasket, the 2015 EuroBasket, and the 2016 Turin FIBA World Olympic Qualifying Tournament.

== Personal life ==
Perperoglou is married to former WNBA player Erin Buescher Perperoglou.

== Career statistics ==
Legend
GP	Games played	GS	Games started	MPG	Minutes per game
FG%	Field-goal percentage	3P%	3-point field-goal percentage	FT%	Free-throw percentage
RPG	Rebounds per game	APG	Assists per game	SPG	Steals per game
BPG	Blocks per game	PPG	Points per game	PIR	Performance index rating
**Bold**	Career high

=== EuroLeague ===
†	Denotes season in which Perperoglou won the EuroLeague
*	Led the league

Year	Team	GP	GS	MPG	FG%	3P%	FT%	RPG	APG	SPG	BPG	PPG	PIR
2007–08	Panathinaikos	9	4	9.9	.485	.250	.333	1.4	.7	.3	.1	3.9	3.1
2008–09†	Panathinaikos	21	19	18.2	.457	.325	.783	2.4	1.0	1.0	**.3**	5.5	5.8
2009–10	Panathinaikos	15	14	20.7	**.516**	**.500**	.846	1.9	1.2	**1.8**	.3	6.1	7.1
2010–11†	Panathinaikos	22	11	18.3	.424	.404	.685	2.3	0.7	.5	.3	7.1	5.8
2011–12	Panathinaikos	11	5	15.5	.395	.333	.500	1.5	0.7	.4	.2	3.7	1.6
2012–13†	Olympiacos	**31***	1	16.6	.398	.299	.760	2.4	1.0	.5	.1	5.8	4.8
2013–14	Olympiacos	22	10	20.2	.458	.462	.850	2.8	1.2	.7	—	**9.9**	**9.2**
2014–15	Anadolu Efes	27	20	**23.9**	.387	.344	**.868**	**3.7**	1.3	.9	.2	9.8	**9.2**
2015–16	Barcelona	29	**25**	22.0	.417	.379	.706	3.1	1.1	.6	.2	8.3	7.6
2016–17	Barcelona	22	15	20.9	.381	.358	.682	3.1	**1.5**	.7	.2	6.4	6.5
2019–20	Crvena zvezda	13	0	16.5	.380	.357	.727	2.6	.5	.5	—	7.8	5.2
Career		222	124	18.4	.417	.371	.761	2.6	1.1	.7	.2	7.1	6.4

== Awards and accomplishments ==
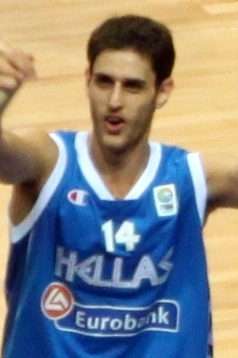
Perperoglou celebrating Greece's win against Turkey (76–74) in EuroBasket 2009

=== Pro clubs ===
- 6× Greek League All-Star: (2007, 2008, 2009, 2010, 2011, 2014)
- Greek League Best Five: (2007)
- 3× Greek Cup Winner: (2008, 2009, 2012)
- 4× Greek League Champion: (2008, 2009, 2010, 2011)
- 3× EuroLeague Champion: (2009, 2011, 2013)
- Triple Crown Winner: (2009)
- 2× All-Greek League Second Team: (2011, 2014)
- FIBA Intercontinental Cup Champion: (2013)
- EuroLeague MVP of the Month: (December 2013)
- Turkish Cup Winner: (2015)
- Spanish Supercup Winner: (2015)
- Adriatic Supercup Winner: (2018)
- All-Adriatic League Team (2019)
- Adriatic League Champion: (2019)
- Serbian League champion: (2019)

=== Greek junior national team ===
- 2002 FIBA Europe Under-18 Championship: Bronze
- 2003 FIBA Under-19 World Cup: Bronze

=== Greek senior national team ===
- 2009 EuroBasket: Bronze
