= Andrija Gavrilović =

Serbian basketball coach

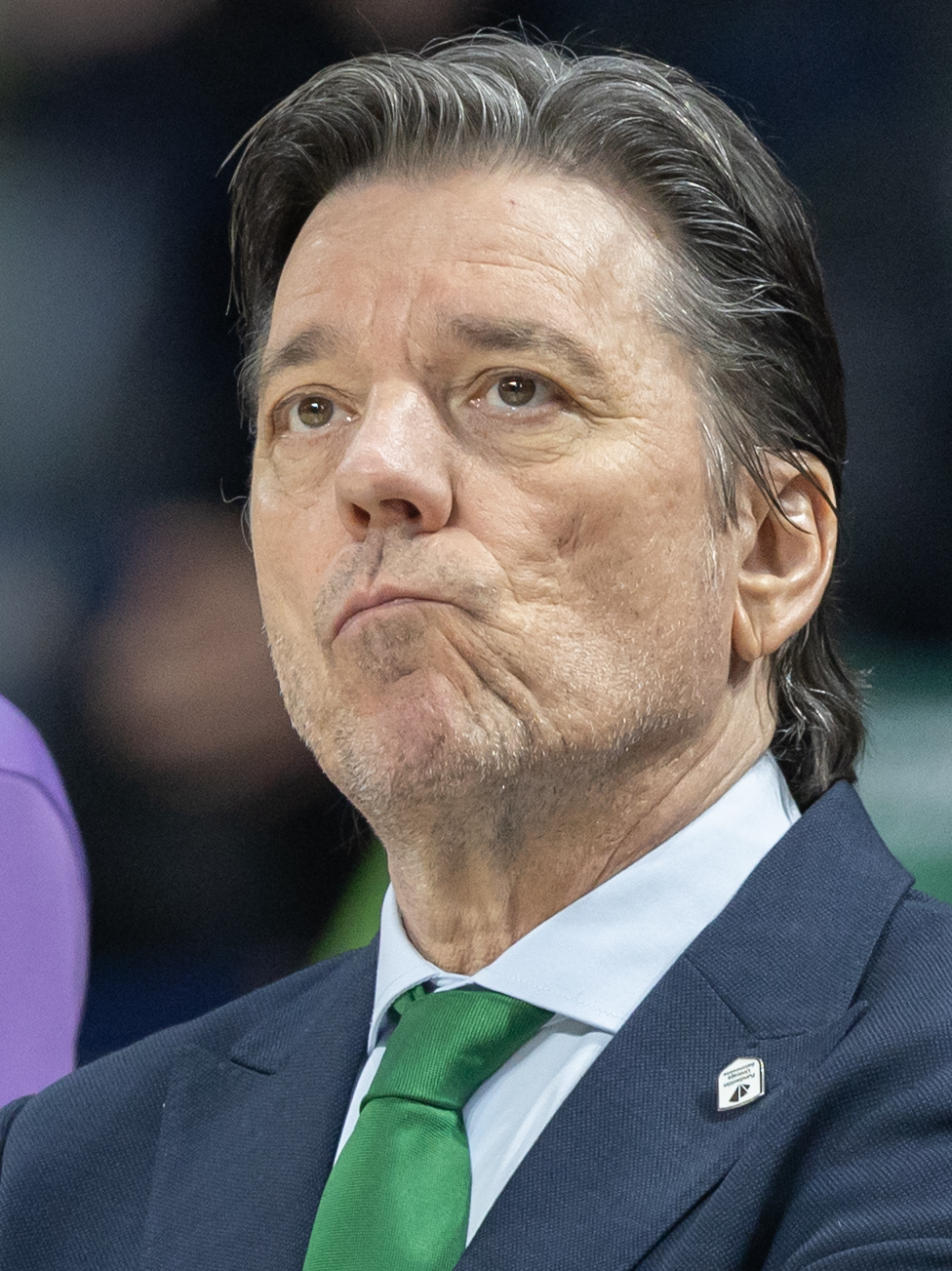
- Gavrilović in April 2026

Personal information
- Born: 13 January 1965 (age 61) Belgrade, SR Serbia, SFR Yugoslavia
- Position: Assistant coach
- Coaching career: 1986–present

Career history

Coaching
- 2002–2003: Roseto Sharks (youth)
- 2003–2006: Virtus Bologna (assistant)
- 2006–2007: Unicaja (assistant)
- 2008–2009: UNICS (assistant)
- 2009–2015: Khimki (assistant)
- 2018–2020: Crvena zvezda (assistant)
- 2019: Crvena zvezda (interim)
- 2021–2022: Virtus Bologna (assistant)

Career highlights
- As assistant coach: 3× EuroCup champion (2012, 2015, 2022); VTB United League champion (2011); Russian Cup winner (2009); Adriatic League champion (2019); Adriatic Supercup champion (2018); Serbian League champion (2019); Italian Supercup winner (2021)

Andrija Gavrilović (Serbian Cyrillic: Андрија Гавриловић; born 13 January 1965) is a Serbian-Italian professional basketball coach who was lastly an assistant coach for Virtus Bologna of the Italian Lega Basket Serie A (LBA).

== Coaching career ==
In 1986, Gavrilović started his coaching career with the Crvena zvezda youth system. There he coached Nebojša Ilić, Aleksandar Trifunović, Rastko Cvetković, Mirko Pavlović, Slobodan Kaličanin, and later Nikola Jestratijević, Srđan Jovanović, and Igor Perović.

Gavrilović moved to Bormio, Italy in September 1992. Until 2003, he was a coach in several academy teams in the Milan area. He also coached the U16 team of Roseto Sharks and Progresso Castelmaggiore. Later, he spent three seasons as an assistant coach for Virtus Bologna. Further, he was an assistant coach for Unicaja of the Spanish ACB League.

In 2007, he signed as an assistant coach for UNICS of the Russian Super League. Next season, he had moved to Khimki where he stayed for six seasons.

In July 2018, Gavrilović was named an assistant coach for the Belgrade team Crvena zvezda mts. On 2 February 2019 Gavrilović led Crvena zvezda to an 89–61 win over Petrol Olimpija. The Zvezda head coach Milan Tomić had fallen ill and missed their home game against Olimpija. On 22 October 2019 Gavrilović was named as the interim head coach for Crvena zvezda. In his official head coaching debut on 24 October, Gavrilović led the Zvezda to a 73–65 loss to FC Barcelona. He finished his stint as the interim head coach with a 5–6 record on 23 November. In June 2020, Crvena zvezda parted ways with him.

In July 2021, Gavrilović was named an assistant coach for Virtus Bologna under Sergio Scariolo. On 21 September, the team won the second Supercup in its history, defeating Olimpia Milano 90–84. Moreover, after having ousted Lietkabelis, Ulm and Valencia in the first three rounds of the playoffs, on 11 May 2022, Virtus defeated Frutti Extra Bursaspor by 80–67 at the Segafredo Arena, winning its first EuroCup and qualifying for the EuroLeague after 14 years. He parted ways with Virtus Bologna in July 2022.

== Coaching record ==
Legend
G	Games coached	W	Games won	L	Games lost	W–L %	Win-loss %

Note: The EuroLeague is not the only competition in which the team played during the season. He also coached in domestic competition, and regional competition if applicable.

=== EuroLeague ===
Team	Year	G	W	L	W–L%	Result
Crvena zvezda	2019–20	7	2	5	.286	Interim coach
Career		7	2	5	.286	

== Personal life ==
Gavrilović holds both a Serbian and Italian passport. Beside native Serbian, he speaks Italian, English, Russian and Spanish language.

== See also ==
- List of KK Crvena zvezda head coaches
