= Kalin Lucas =

American basketball player (born 1989)

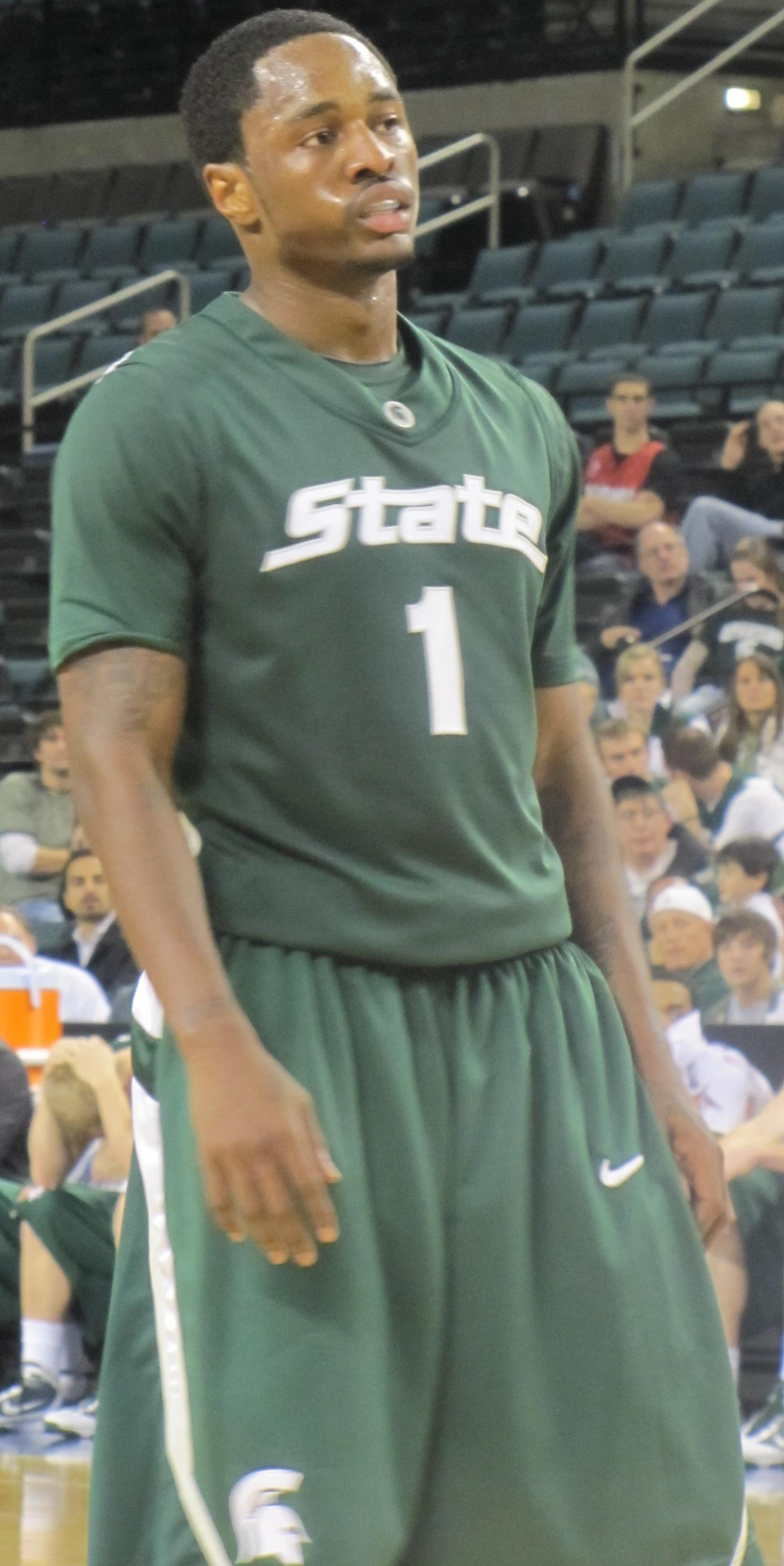
- Lucas with the Michigan State Spartans in 2009

Personal information
- Born: May 24, 1989 (age 37) Detroit, Michigan, U.S.
- Listed height: 6 ft 1 in (1.85 m)
- Listed weight: 190 lb (86 kg)

Career information
- High school: St. Mary's Prep (Orchard Lake, Michigan)
- College: Michigan State (2007–2011)
- NBA draft: 2011: undrafted
- Playing career: 2011–2024
- Position: Point guard
- Number: 6, 9, 27, 24, 14, 1

Career history
- 2011–2012: Olympiacos
- 2012–2013: Banvit
- 2013–2015: Iowa Energy
- 2014: Memphis Grizzlies
- 2015–2016: TED Ankara Kolejliler
- 2016: Iowa Energy
- 2016–2017: Erie BayHawks
- 2017–2018: Hapoel Jerusalem
- 2018–2019: Stockton Kings
- 2019: Detroit Pistons
- 2019: → Grand Rapids Drive
- 2020: Crvena zvezda
- 2020: Ironi Nahariya
- 2021: Maccabi Haifa
- 2021: Gigantes de Carolina
- 2021–2022: Merkezefendi Bld. Denizli Basket
- 2022: Forlì
- 2022–2023: Al-Jahra
- 2023: Sharjah SC
- 2024: BCH Garid
- 2024: Real Estelí

Career highlights
- Big Ten Player of The Year (2009); 2× First-team All-Big Ten (2009, 2010); Second-team All-Big Ten (2011)
- Stats at NBA.com
- Stats at Basketball Reference

Kalin Jay Lucas (born May 24, 1989) is an American former professional basketball player. He played college basketball for Michigan State University.

== High school career ==
Considered a four-star recruit by Rivals.com, Lucas was listed as the No. 6 point guard and the No. 38 player in the nation in 2007.

== College career ==
As a freshman, Lucas immediately saw heavy playing time for the 2007–08 Spartans, averaging 25.1 minutes per game. His team-leading 13.5 points per game in the first two rounds of the NCAA Tournament were a major component of their Sweet Sixteen run.

During his sophomore season, Lucas earned Big Ten Player of the Year honors, All-Big Ten first-team selection, and was named Michigan State's MVP, all while carrying the Spartans to the National Championship game against North Carolina. He led MSU in scoring (14.7 ppg), field goals made (173) and attempted (438), free throws made (172) and attempted (213), assists (4.6 apg) and minutes (31.9 mpg), while ranking second in steals (39).

Lucas continued to lead the Spartans in his junior season, as he earned All-Big Ten first-team honors and was also named Co-MVP of the team, along with Raymar Morgan. On January 26, 2010, he made a mid-range jumper at Michigan with 3.5 seconds remaining, which gave Michigan State a one-point lead, and eventually a 57–56 victory over their in-state rivals. He struggled to stay healthy the rest of the season, spraining his ankle a month before the Big Ten Tournament and eventually rupturing his Achilles tendon in the second round of the 2010 NCAA Tournament against Maryland. Lucas' season was instantly put to an end, but the Spartans rallied, making their way to a second straight Final Four appearance.

Lucas was voted Team MVP and All-Big Ten second team during his senior season. He finished his four-year career at Michigan State as the school's all-time leader in free-throws made (507) and attempted (637). He is also one of just four Spartans to total 1,500 career points and 500 career assists, finishing his career with 1,996 total points.

== Professional career ==
=== 2011–2015 ===
On July 23, 2011, Lucas signed with Olympiacos of the Greek Basket League. On January 24, 2012, he was released by Olympiacos. Five days later, he signed with Banvit of Turkey for the rest of the 2011–12 season.

In July 2012, Lucas joined the San Antonio Spurs for the 2012 NBA Summer League. In October 2012, he re-joined Banvit for the 2012–13 season.

On September 27, 2013, Lucas signed with the Chicago Bulls, but was later waived on October 2. In November 2013, he was acquired by the Iowa Energy of the NBA Development League as an affiliate player of the Bulls.

In July 2014, Lucas joined the Memphis Grizzlies for the 2014 NBA Summer League. He signed with the Grizzlies on September 25, 2014, but was later waived on October 25.

On October 31, 2014, Lucas was reacquired by the Iowa Energy. He re-signed with the Grizzlies on November 4, 2014. but was waived again on November 9 before appearing in a game for them. He re-joined Iowa on November 12, only to re-sign with the Grizzlies on November 19 and debuting in the NBA the same day, recording one steal in five minutes of action against the Toronto Raptors. However, he was waived again the next day. On November 22, he re-joined Iowa. In March 2015, he left Iowa and signed with TED Ankara Kolejliler of the Turkish Basketball League.

=== 2015–2019 ===
In July 2015, Lucas signed with the Chinese team Qingdao DoubleStar, but was let go after a tryout period. He subsequently re-signed with TED Ankara Kolejliler in August 2015. Lucas was selected to compete in the Turkish League's All-Star Skills Challenge but had to withdraw due to injury.

On October 29, 2016, Lucas was reacquired by the Iowa Energy. In 14 games, he averaged 16.9 points, 5.1 assists, 3.9 rebounds, and 1.1 steals. On December 22, he was traded to the Erie BayHawks in exchange for the rights to Jordan Sibert and a third-round pick.

On August 31, 2017, Lucas signed with the Orlando Magic. On October 13, 2017, he was waived by the Magic.

On November 5, 2017, Lucas signed with the Israeli team Hapoel Jerusalem for the 2017–18 season.

For the 2018–19 season, Lucas joined the Stockton Kings of the G League. On January 15, 2019, he was signed by the Detroit Pistons on a two-way contract.

=== 2020–2024 ===
On February 15, 2020, Lucas was signed by Crvena zvezda of the ABA League and the EuroLeague for the rest of the 2019–20 season.

On August 13, 2020, Ironi Nahariya announced that they had signed Lucas. He averaged 21.1 points, and 4 assist per game.

In 2021, Lucas signed with Maccabi Haifa of the Israeli Basketball Premier League. He averaged 14.5 points, 4.8 assists, 3.5 rebounds, and 1.0 steal per game.

On September 7, 2021, Lucas signed with Gigantes de Carolina of the Baloncesto Superior Nacional. He averaged 19 points and 9.6 assist per game.

On November 8, 2021, he has signed with Merkezefendi Belediyesi Denizli Basket of the Basketbol Süper Ligi. Lucas averaged 14.1 points and 5.2 assists per game. On February 15, 2022, he has signed with Forlì of the Serie A2 Basket.

On November 4, 2022, Kalin signed with Al-Jahra of the Kuwaiti Division I Basketball League. He had a career high back to back 50 point games. He averaged 44.6 points per game. pints

On February 16, 2023, Kalin signed with Sharjah_ssc in Dubai.

On January 9, 2024, Kalin signed with Homenetmen Beirut in Lebanon, but was denied entry to the country. On January 23, 2024, Kalin signed with BCH Garid. On March 7, 2024, Kalin signed with Real Estelí.

== Career statistics ==
Legend
GP	Games played	GS	Games started	MPG	Minutes per game
FG%	Field-goal percentage	3P%	3-point field-goal percentage	FT%	Free-throw percentage
RPG	Rebounds per game	APG	Assists per game	SPG	Steals per game
BPG	Blocks per game	PPG	Points per game	PIR	Performance index rating
**Bold**	Career high

=== NBA ===
==== Regular season ====
Year	Team	GP	GS	MPG	FG%	3P%	FT%	RPG	APG	SPG	BPG	PPG
2014–15	Memphis	**1**	0	**6.0**	.000	-	-	.0	.0	.0	.0	0.0
2018–19	Detroit	**1**	0	**6.0**	.000	.000	**1.000**	**3.0**	**1.0**	.0	.0	**2.0**
Career		2	0	6.0	.000	.000	1.000	1.5	.5	.5	.0	1.0

=== EuroLeague ===
†	Denotes seasons in which Lucas won the EuroLeague

Year	Team	GP	GS	MPG	FG%	3P%	FT%	RPG	APG	SPG	BPG	PPG	PIR
2011–12†	Olympiacos	**9**	**3**	**18.0**	**.388**	**.462**	**.833**	**1.6**	1.0	**.8**	—	**5.4**	**3.3**
2019–20	Crvena zvezda	3	0	13.0	.250	.000	—	.3	**3.0**	.3	—	1.3	2.3
Career		12	3	16.8	.368	.375	.833	1.3	1.5	.7	—	4.4	3.1

== Personal life ==
Lucas' cousin, Rob Edwards, is also a fellow professional basketball player.
