= Milan Tomić =

Serbian-Greek basketball player and coach

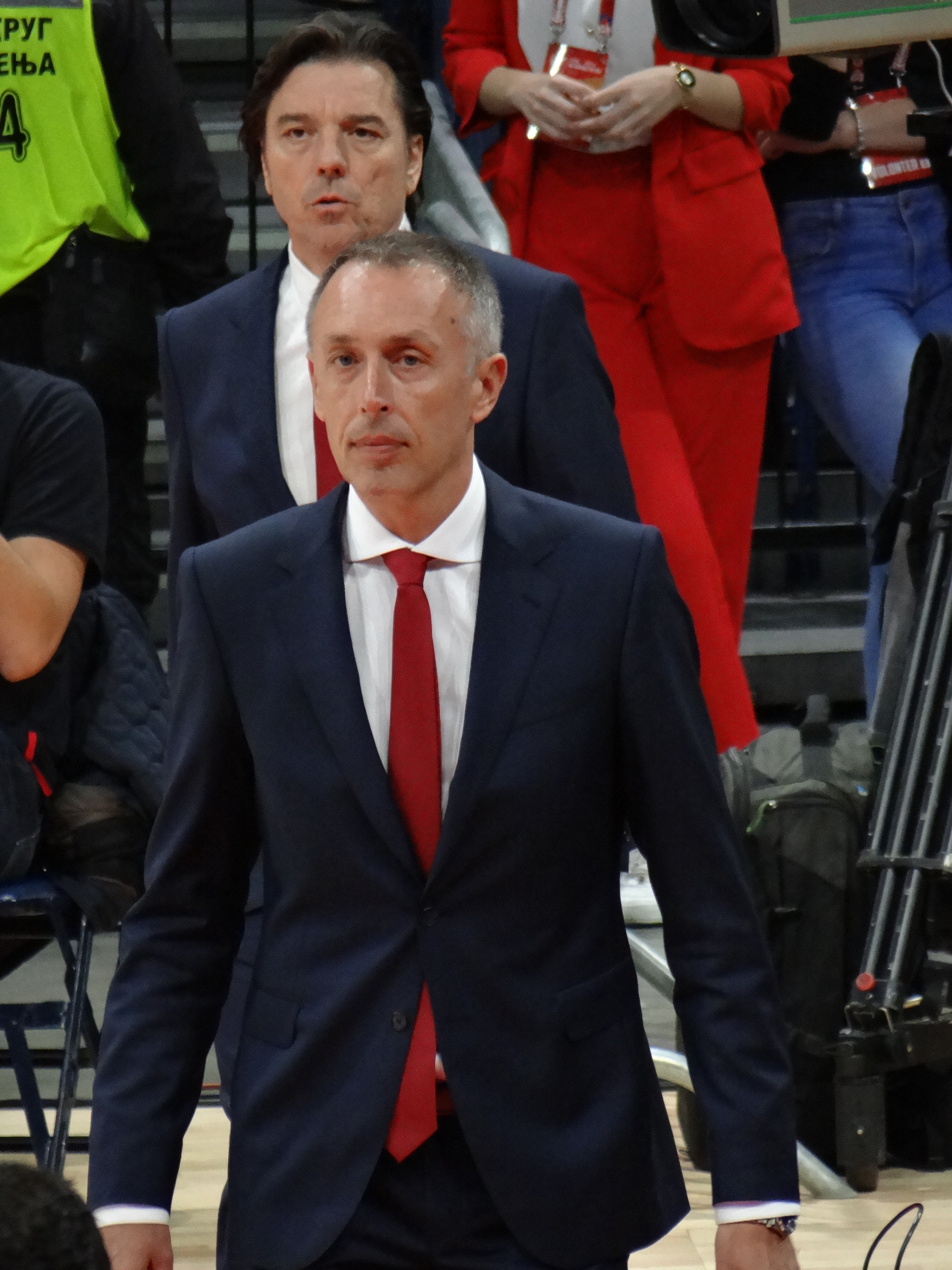
- Tomić in October 2019

Personal information
- Born: 24 July 1973 (age 53) Belgrade, SR Serbia, SFR Yugoslavia
- Listed height: 6 ft 2.75 in (1.90 m)
- Listed weight: 190 lb (86 kg)

Career information
- NBA draft: 1995: undrafted
- Playing career: 1990–2006
- Position: Point guard
- Number: 11, 8, 4
- Coaching career: 2004–present

Career history

Playing
- 1990–1991: Radnički
- 1991–2005: Olympiacos
- 2005: Aurora Basket Jesi
- 2006: Kolossos Rodou

Coaching
- 2004: Olympiacos (interim)
- 2008–2018: Olympiacos (assistant)
- 2014: Olympiacos (interim)
- 2018–2019: Crvena zvezda
- 2021–2022: Peristeri
- 2023–2025: Olimpia Milano (assistant)
- 2026: Crvena zvezda (interim)

Career highlights
- As player: EuroLeague champion (1997); 5× Greek League champion (1993–1997); 3× Greek Cup winner (1994, 1997, 2002); As head coach: ABA League champion (2019); ABA League Supercup winner (2018); Serbian League champion (2019); As assistant coach: 2× EuroLeague champion (2012, 2013); FIBA Intercontinental Cup winner (2013); 3× Greek League champion (2013, 2015, 2016); 2× Greek Cup winner (2010, 2011); Italian Supercup winner (2024)

Milan Tomić (Serbian: Милaн Томић, Greek: Μίλαν Τόμιτς; born 24 July 1973) is a Serbian-Greek professional basketball coach and former player.

Tomić has spent almost all of his professional playing and coaching career in Greece, after he took Greek nationality, under the name of Milan Giannakopoulos (Greek: Μίλαν Γιαννακόπουλος). During his playing years in Olympiacos, he became an idol among the team's fans. Still considered a legend to Olympiacos fans after his retirement as a player, he took an assistant coach's spot with the team, under then head coach Panagiotis Giannakis.

== Playing career ==
=== Early years and the golden era ===
Tomić started his career playing for Radnički as a teenager, and made a name as a good young player. Summer 1991 set a fresh start for Olympiacos. New chairman Kokkalis appointed Giannis Ioannidis as head coach, with a goal to put the team in European basketball's elite.

Ioannidis invited Tomić, among other young Serbs for a trial. And offered him a spot on the team's roster.

But for the transfer to be completed, Tomić had to take Greek citizenship, since only one non-Greek player was allowed at that time (that player was Žarko Paspalj). At the time, giving Balkan players Greek citizenship was a common practice for Greek teams, and a lot of players did the same. Some famous examples are Peja Stojaković, Dragan Tarlać, and Rasho Nesterović.

Due to some legal problems concerning his citizenship, he was not able to play for one season, so he made his debut for the Reds in 1992–93 season. It wasn't long before Tomić showed his value and potential and was named a starter. At the same time, the team was growing stronger under Ioannidis' guidance, and won the Greek League championship, despite the fact they had the home court disadvantage against Panathinaikos, the team's arch-rivals, going into the playoff finals.

Olympiacos also returned to European competitions, and reached the EuroLeague quarterfinals, with Tomić averaging 32.5 minutes and 8.3 points per game. The following two seasons, Tomić established his position as the starting point guard, while Olympiacos dominated the Greek League, winning both regular seasons and the playoffs, beating PAOK in 1994, and Panathinaikos in the 1995 finals, respectively. Olympiacos also found European recognition by reaching two consecutive EuroLeague Finals.

The arrival of David Rivers pushed Tomić on the bench, reducing his playing time. Still, he helped the team retain its Greek League title. The 1996–97 season is perhaps the best in Olympiacos history. Dušan Ivković took over as head coach, and gave Tomić more playing time. Especially during the important last part of the season, when Ivković made him starting point guard, moving Rivers to the shooting guard position. The end of the season found Olympiacos as Greek League champions, EuroLeague champions, for the first time, and Greek Cup winners, making them the first Greek team to hold those titles simultaneously. Thus, they won the coveted Triple Crown. A few months later, Olympiacos participated in the 1997 McDonald's Championship, and made it to the final, where they faced the reigning NBA champions, the Chicago Bulls. Tomić was guarding Michael Jordan, and several funny incidents happened between them.

=== Captain of Olympiacos and downfall ===
After having won everything the previous year, a lot of players left the team of Olympiacos. One of them was the team's captain, Giorgos Sigalas. Tomić was already acting as captain all those years.

Olympiacos remained a top European team but wasn't capable of winning a title. They reached the Greek League finals twice, but lost, and also participated in the 1999 EuroLeague Final Four, only to take the third place. On the contrary, Tomić evolved as a player. He was playing more, scoring more, and was a true captain on and off the court, as he became the Olympiacos fan's favorite player.

=== Captain's justification ===
Olympiacos' chairman hired Lefteris Soumpotits as head coach, for the 2001–02 season. Soumpotits brought along with him to the team, a young talented point guard named Theo Papaloukas. Papaloukas' presence reduced Tomić's playing time, but on the other hand, their rotation, and sometimes combination in the lineup, made the team better in matters of team-play, organization, passing, and defense.

Olympiacos won the Greek Cup, so Tomić's dream of raising a trophy, as a team captain, in front of his team's fans, became reality. Later that season, Olympiacos faced Panathinaikos in the Greek League semifinals, having the home court disadvantage, and still managed to "sweep" them in two games. During the decisive second game's last minutes, Panathinaikos seemed to have the game's momentum.

When suddenly, a fight broke out, after a hard foul. Moments later, all eyes turned to watch Tomić fighting against Panathinaikos' star player Dejan Bodiroga, whom was also the most hated rival player for fans of Olympiacos. The image of Tomić punching Bodiroga became an all-time favourite for Olympiacos' hardcore fans.

After the fight, Tomić, Bodiroga, and several other players were sent out of the game, but the game's momentum had changed, and Olympiacos won the game, and advanced to the league's finals against AEK Athens. Olympiacos won the first two games, but AEK made a huge comeback and won the series.

=== Beginning of the end of playing career ===
After the 2001–02 season, many important players left the team of Olympiacos. Tomić was still giving the team his best, but the quality of the team's roster had deteriorated. The 2003–04 season was even worse. The glory days of the past seemed so far away. Tomić performed way below his standards.

Olympiacos failed to beat Aris in the Greek Cup's Final. In addition to that, the team was fighting for a Greek League playoff position. Chairman Kokkalis decided to fire head coach Dragan Šakota, and to everyone's surprise, asked Tomić to take the empty spot on the bench. Tomić loved the team so much that he didn't question that decision and took the job. Under his reign as head coach, the team improved and played better, but was eliminated in the Greek League playoffs.

The season ended, and Tomic asked for a multi-year contract, so he would have the time to build a new winning team. The team's new directors didn't like his demands, and gave his head coaching position to Milan Minić. The new season started, and after some bad results, Minić was fired and replaced by Jonas Kazlauskas.

Tomić was hardly given any playing time, while the team was constantly losing. Things got worse, when they lost 59-110 to the Turkish club Efes, in a EuroLeague game. That was the biggest home loss in the team's history in European-wide competition. It was a big embarrassment for the Olympiacos fans, who were furious, and began swearing at players, coaches, and team directors. Only one of the team's names was chanted by the fans in a good way. The name was Milan Tomić. Surprisingly, Tomić was asked to leave the team a few days later. He did so without complaining, while the fans were shocked at watching their team lose its natural leader.

=== Playing career end ===
In January 2005, Lefteris Soumpotits took over as the head coach of the Italian club Sicc Cucine Jesi, and he brought Tomić, who was a free agent at the time, along with him, to help save the team from relegation. Tomić played in 14 games for the Italian League team, averaging 9.8 points per game, but the team finished in last place in the league standings. Tomić made yet another effort to continue his playing career, and signed a contract with the Greek club Kolossos Rodou, in January 2006. The irony was that his debut game with Kolossos was against Olympiacos. When he entered onto the court, Olympiacos fans once again chanted his name. He only played in two games for Kolossos, and then he decided to retire because he felt he had nothing more to offer as a player.

== Coaching career ==
=== Olympiacos ===
Tomić studied and got a 1st grade basketball coaching degree. In February 2008, Panagiotis Giannakis became the new Olympiacos head coach. Giannakis asked Tomić to be a part of the team's coaching staff, so he returned to his beloved team, as an assistant coach. In 2014, Tomić became the interim head coach of Olympiacos, after Georgios Bartzokas resigned as the team's head coach, until Ioannis Sfairopoulos became the team's new head coach.

=== Crvena zvezda ===
On 13 July 2018 Tomić was named a head coach from his hometown Belgrade-based team Crvena zvezda. He signed a three-year deal. He resigned on 22 October 2019. He finished his stint with a 56–19 record.

=== Peristeri ===
In December 2021, Tomić took over the head coaching job for Peristeri of the Greek Basket League, replacing Sotiris Manolopoulos.

=== Olimpia Milano ===
Since July 2023 he is the assistant coach of Ettore Messina in Olimpia Armani Milano

== Personal life ==
Tomić has dual citizenship with both Serbia and Greece. He lived the first 18 years of his life in Serbia and has since lived in Greece. He speaks Serbian, Greek, and English fluently. His official Greek name is Milan Giannakopoulos (Greek: Μίλαν Γιαννακόπουλος).

His son, Alexandros Tomits Liafou (born 2002), is a basketball player for the Crvena zvezda U16 team.

== Career achievements and awards ==
As player

- EuroLeague champion: 1 (with Olympiacos: 1996–97)
- Greek League champion: 5 (with Olympiacos: 1992–93, 1993–94, 1994–95, 1995–96, 1996–97)
- Greek Cup winner: 3 (with Olympiacos: 1993–94, 1996–97, 2001–02)
- Triple Crown winner: 1 (with Olympiacos: 1996–97)

As head coach

- ABA League champion: 1 (with Crvena zvezda: 2018–19)
- ABA League Supercup winner: 1 (with Crvena zvezda: 2018)
- Serbian League champion: 1 (with Crvena zvezda: 2018–19)

As assistant coach

- EuroLeague champion: 2 (with Olympiacos: 2011–12, 2012–13)
- FIBA Intercontinental Cup winner: 1 (with Olympiacos: 2013)
- Greek League champion: 3 (with Olympiacos: 2011–12, 2014–15, 2015–16)
- Greek Cup winner: 2 (with Olympiacos: 2009–10, 2010–11)

=== Individual achievements as a player ===
Olympiacos

- 1st in games played with Olympiacos in Greek League (383 games).
- 2nd in games played with Olympiacos in EuroLeague, behind Georgios Printezis (214 games).
- 2nd in points scored with Olympiacos in Greek League, behind Georgios Printezis (2,911 points).
- 3rd in points scored with Olympiacos in EuroLeague, behind Vassilis Spanoulis and Georgios Printezis (1,482 points).
- 2nd in assists with Olympiacos in Greek League, behind Vassilis Spanoulis (801 assists).
- 3rd in assists with Olympiacos in EuroLeague, behind Vassilis Spanoulis and Vangelis Mantzaris (341 assists).
- 2nd in steals with Olympiacos in Greek League behind Kostas Papanikolaou (287 steals).

== Coaching record ==
Legend
G	Games coached	W	Games won	L	Games lost	W–L %	Win-loss %

Note: The EuroLeague is not the only competition in which the team played during the season. He also coached in domestic competition, and regional competition if applicable.

=== EuroLeague ===
Team	Year	G	W	L	W–L%	Result
Crvena zvezda	2019–20	3	1	2	.333	Resigned
Career		3	1	2	.333	
