= Los Angeles Clippers all-time roster =

The Los Angeles Clippers are a professional basketball team competing in the National Basketball Association (NBA). The team has played in three locations since the franchise's founding in 1970. The team was known as the Buffalo Braves from 1970 to 1978, the San Diego Clippers from 1978 to 1984, and has been the Los Angeles Clippers since 1984.

== Players ==
Note: Statistics are correct as the end of the 2025–26 season.

G	Guard	G/F	Guard-forward	F	Forward	F/C	Forward-center	C	Center

legend
^	Denotes player who has been inducted to the Naismith Memorial Basketball Hall of Fame
*	Denotes player who has been selected for at least one All-Star Game with the Los Angeles Clippers and is currently on the team roster
^{+}	Denotes player who has been selected for at least one All-Star Game with the Los Angeles Clippers
^{x}	Denotes player who is currently on the Los Angeles Clippers roster
0.0	Denotes the Los Angeles Clippers statistics leader (min. 100 games played for the team for per-game statistics)

=== A to B ===
All-time roster
Player	Pos.	Pre-draft team	Yrs	Seasons	Statistics									Ref.
Player	Pos.	Pre-draft team	Yrs	Seasons	GP	MP	REB	AST	PTS	MPG	RPG	APG	PPG	Ref.
Zaid Abdul-Aziz	F/C	Iowa State	1	1976–1977	22	195	90	7	83	8.9	4.1	0.3	3.8	
Alex Acker	G	Pepperdine	1	2008–2009	18	179	22	11	63	9.9	1.2	0.6	3.5	
Don Adams	F	Northwestern	2	1975–1977	133	2,414	516	223	735	18.2	3.9	1.7	5.5	
Mark Aguirre	G/F	DePaul	1	1993–1994	39	859	116	104	413	22.0	3.0	2.7	10.6	
Cole Aldrich	C	Kansas	1	2015–2016	60	800	288	50	328	13.3	4.8	0.8	5.5	
Al-Farouq Aminu	F	Wake Forest	1	2010–2011	81	1,452	267	60	457	17.9	3.3	0.7	5.6	
Alan Anderson	G/F	Michigan State	1	2016–2017	30	308	24	11	86	10.3	0.8	0.4	2.9	
Derek Anderson	G	Kentucky	1	1999–2000	64	2,201	258	220	1,080	34.4	4.0	3.4	16.9	
Kenny Anderson	G	Georgia Tech	1	2004–2005	4	26	5	5	8	6.5	1.3	1.3	2.0	
Richard Anderson	F/C	UC Santa Barbara	1	1982–1983	78	1,274	272	120	403	16.3	3.5	1.5	5.2	
Isaac Austin	C	Arizona State	1	1997–1998	26	895	227	88	396	34.4	8.7	3.4	15.2	
Anthony Avent	F	Seton Hall	1	1999–2000	49	377	74	11	81	7.7	1.5	0.2	1.7	
Bird Averitt	G	Pepperdine	2	1976–1978	109	1,812	128	262	911	16.6	1.2	2.4	8.4	
Jeff Ayres	F	Arizona State	1	2015–2016	17	107	22	5	30	6.3	1.3	0.3	1.8	
Maurice Baker	G	Oklahoma State	1	2004–2005	1	1	0	0	0	1.0	0.0	0.0	0.0	
Vin Baker	F	Hartford	1	2005–2006	8	85	19	4	27	10.6	2.4	0.5	3.4	
Patrick Baldwin Jr.	F	Milwaukee	2	2024–2026	4	18	4	1	16	4.5	1.0	0.3	4.0	
Cedric Ball	F	Charlotte	1	1990–1991	7	26	11	0	8	3.7	1.6	0.0	1.1	
Mo Bamba	C	Texas	1	2024–2025	28	352	120	16	128	12.6	4.3	0.6	4.6	
Ken Bannister	F/C	Saint Augustine's	3	1988–1991	108	1,058	241	30	391	9.8	2.2	0.3	3.6	
Dalano Banton	G	Nebraska	1	2025–2026	2	10	1	2	6	5.0	0.5	1.0	3.0	
Marvin Barnes	F/C	Providence	2	1977–1978; 1979–1980	68	1,664	425	135	630	24.5	6.3	2.0	9.3	
Matt Barnes	F	UCLA	4	2003–2004; 2012–2015	257	6,788	1,111	410	2,382	26.4	4.3	1.6	9.3	
Andre Barrett	G	Seton Hall	1	2007–2008	4	25	1	7	6	6.3	0.3	1.8	1.5	
Brent Barry	G	Oregon State	3	1995–1998	179	4,333	421	516	1,803	24.2	2.4	2.9	10.1	
Brandon Bass	F	LSU	1	2016–2017	52	577	129	21	292	11.1	2.5	0.4	5.6	
Nicolas Batum^{x}	F	(France) Le Mans Sarthe	6	2020–2026	359	7,723	1,278	522	2,123	21.5	3.6	1.5	5.9	
Bradley Beal^{x}	G	Florida	1	2025–2026	6	121	5	10	49	20.2	0.8	1.7	8.2	
MarJon Beauchamp	F	Yakima Valley	1	2024–2025	3	17	3	2	12	5.7	1.0	0.7	4.0	
Benoit Benjamin	C	Creighton	6	1985–1991	406	12,724	3,538	776	5,405	31.3	8.7	1.9	13.3	
Mario Bennett	F	Arizona State	1	1999–2000	1	3	2	0	0	3.0	2.0	0.0	0.0	
Patrick Beverley	G	Arkansas	4	2017–2021	177	4,645	818	591	1,413	26.2	4.6	3.3	8.0	
Henry Bibby	G	UCLA	1	1980–1981	73	1,112	74	200	335	15.2	1.0	2.7	4.6	
Bob Bigelow	G/F	Penn	1	1978–1979	29	413	46	25	85	14.2	1.6	0.9	2.9	
Chauncey Billups^	G	Colorado	2	2011–2013	42	1,025	82	129	483	24.4	2.0	3.1	11.5	
Steve Blake	G	Maryland	1	2009–2010	29	762	69	177	198	26.3	2.4	6.1	6.8	
Eric Bledsoe	G	Kentucky	4	2010–2013; 2021–2022	251	5,219	695	813	1,852	20.8	2.8	3.2	7.4	
Bogdan Bogdanović^{x}	G	(Serbia) Partizan	2	2024–2026	53	1,202	152	148	514	22.7	2.9	2.8	9.7	
Etdrick Bohannon	F	Auburn Montgomery	1	1999–2000	11	113	30	5	26	10.3	2.7	0.5	2.4	
Brandon Boston Jr.	G/F	Kentucky	3	2021–2024	105	1,353	193	84	653	12.9	1.8	0.8	6.2	
Nate Bowman	C	Wichita State	1	1970–1971	44	483	173	41	136	11.0	3.9	0.9	3.1	
Earl Boykins	G	Eastern Michigan	2	2000–2002	78	910	65	177	345	11.7	0.8	2.3	4.4	
Avery Bradley	G	Texas	2	2017–2019	55	1,628	153	107	455	29.6	2.8	1.9	8.3	
Elton Brand^{+}	F	Duke	7	2001–2008	459	17,595	4,710	1,242	9,336	38.3	10.3	2.7	20.3	
Junior Bridgeman	G/F	Louisville	2	1984–1986	138	3,203	353	279	1,625	23.2	2.6	2.0	11.8	
Jim Brogan	G	West Virginia Wesleyan	2	1981–1983	121	1,493	182	222	619	12.3	1.5	1.8	5.1	
Gary Brokaw	G	Notre Dame	1	1977–1978	13	130	12	20	54	10.0	0.9	1.5	4.2	
Michael Brooks	F	La Salle	4	1980–1984	293	9,091	1,929	794	4,010	31.0	6.6	2.7	13.7	
Bobby Brown	G	Cal State Fullerton	1	2009–2010	23	191	20	42	70	8.3	0.9	1.8	3.0	
Kobe Brown	F	Missouri	3	2023–2026	118	961	180	76	266	8.1	1.5	0.6	2.3	
Moses Brown	C	UCLA	1	2022–2023	34	288	139	4	155	8.5	4.1	0.1	4.6	
Tony Brown	G/F	Arkansas	1	1991–1992	22	254	28	16	103	11.5	1.3	0.7	4.7	
Rick Brunson	G	Temple	1	2004–2005	80	1,945	187	410	437	24.3	2.3	5.1	5.5	
Em Bryant	G	DePaul	2	1970–1972	127	3,360	389	558	1,004	26.5	3.1	4.4	7.9	
Joe Bryant	F/C	La Salle	3	1979–1982	238	6,675	1,230	522	2,591	28.0	5.2	2.2	10.9	
Wallace Bryant	C	San Francisco	1	1985–1986	8	64	20	4	13	8.0	2.5	0.5	1.6	
Torgeir Bryn	C	Texas State	1	1989–1990	3	10	2	0	4	3.3	0.7	0.0	1.3	
Reggie Bullock	G/F	North Carolina	2	2013–2015	68	658	94	18	180	9.7	1.4	0.3	2.6	
Steve Burtt Sr.	G	Iona	1	1987–1988	19	312	27	38	171	16.4	1.4	2.0	9.0	
Caron Butler	F	UConn	2	2011–2013	141	3,750	453	156	1,566	26.6	3.2	1.1	11.1	
Greg Butler	C	Stanford	1	1990–1991	9	37	16	1	14	4.1	1.8	0.1	1.6	
Rasual Butler	G/F	La Salle	2	2009–2011	123	3,446	316	143	1,185	28.0	2.6	1.2	9.6	

=== C ===
All-time roster
Player	Pos.	Pre-draft team	Yrs	Seasons	Statistics									Ref.
Player	Pos.	Pre-draft team	Yrs	Seasons	GP	MP	REB	AST	PTS	MPG	RPG	APG	PPG	Ref.
Michael Cage	F/C	San Diego State	4	1984–1988	305	8,758	2,669	373	3,355	28.7	8.8	1.2	11.0	
Marcus Camby	F/C	UMass	2	2008–2010	113	3,521	1,306	278	1,035	31.2	11.6	2.5	9.2	
Bob Carrington	G/F	Boston College	1	1979–1980	10	134	13	3	36	13.4	1.3	0.3	3.6	
Sam Cassell	G	Florida State	3	2005–2008	174	5,035	559	940	2,545	28.9	3.2	5.4	14.6	
Harvey Catchings	F/C	Hardin-Simmons	1	1984–1985	70	1,049	262	14	203	15.0	3.7	0.2	2.9	
Lionel Chalmers	G	Xavier	1	2004–2005	36	433	31	51	111	12.0	0.9	1.4	3.1	
Jerry Chambers	F	Utah	1	1971–1972	26	369	67	23	178	14.2	2.6	0.9	6.8	
Tom Chambers	F/C	Utah	2	1981–1983	160	5,347	1,080	338	2,783	33.4	6.8	2.1	17.4	
Wilson Chandler	F	DePaul	1	2018–2019	15	226	47	10	64	15.1	3.1	0.7	4.3	
Ken Charles	G	Fordham	3	1973–1976	219	4,630	448	429	1,646	21.1	2.0	2.0	7.5	
Pete Chilcutt	F/C	North Carolina	1	1999–2000	24	347	79	16	73	14.5	3.3	0.7	3.0	
Cam Christie^{x}	G	Minnesota	2	2024–2026	68	539	90	37	174	7.9	1.3	0.5	2.6	
Doug Christie	G/F	Pepperdine	1	2006–2007	7	82	11	8	13	11.7	1.6	1.1	1.9	
Keith Closs	C	Central Connecticut	3	1997–2000	130	1,647	372	44	502	12.7	2.9	0.3	3.9	
Amir Coffey	G/F	Minnesota	6	2019–2025	323	5,953	619	366	2,148	18.4	1.9	1.1	6.7	
Norris Coleman	F	Kansas State	1	1987–1988	29	431	81	13	153	14.9	2.8	0.4	5.3	
James Collins	G	Florida State	1	1997–1998	23	103	14	3	59	4.5	0.6	0.1	2.6	
Jarron Collins	F/C	Stanford	1	2010–2011	23	157	17	1	17	6.8	0.7	0.0	0.7	
John Collins^{x}	F	Wake Forest	1	2025–2026	69	1,872	367	70	935	27.1	5.3	1.0	13.6	
Mardy Collins	G	Temple	2	2008–2010	82	1,285	149	145	342	15.7	1.8	1.8	4.2	
Darren Collison	G	UCLA	1	2013–2014	80	2,069	188	297	911	25.9	2.4	3.7	11.4	
Marty Conlon	F/C	Providence	1	1999–2000	3	9	2	0	2	3.0	0.7	0.0	0.7	
Lester Conner	G	Oregon State	1	1992–1993	31	422	49	65	74	13.6	1.6	2.1	2.4	
Will Conroy	G	Washington	1	2006–2007	4	35	5	8	0	8.8	1.3	2.0	0.0	
Brian Cook	F	Illinois	2	2010–2012	56	568	119	17	224	10.1	2.1	0.3	4.0	
Joe Cooper	F/C	Colorado	1	1982–1983	13	275	71	15	73	21.2	5.5	1.2	5.6	
Lanard Copeland	G	Georgia State	1	1991–1992	10	48	7	5	16	4.8	0.7	0.5	1.6	
DeMarcus Cousins	C	Kentucky	1	2020–2021	16	207	72	16	125	12.9	4.5	1.0	7.8	
Robert Covington	F/C	Tennessee State	3	2021–2024	74	1,357	291	88	536	18.3	3.9	1.2	7.2	
Freddie Crawford	G/F	St. Bonaventure	1	1970–1971	15	203	35	24	88	13.5	2.3	1.6	5.9	
Jamal Crawford	G	Michigan	5	2012–2017	370	10,310	684	971	5,675	27.9	1.8	2.6	15.3	
Charlie Criss	G	New Mexico State	1	1981–1982	28	840	44	112	360	30.0	1.6	4.0	12.9	
Jeff Cross	F	Maine	1	1985–1986	21	128	30	1	26	6.1	1.4	0.0	1.2	
Terry Cummings	F	DePaul	2	1982–1984	151	5,438	1,521	316	3,514	36.0	10.1	2.1	23.3	
Jared Cunningham	G	Oregon State	1	2014–2015	19	89	9	10	35	4.7	0.5	0.5	1.8	
Earl Cureton	F/C	Detroit Mercy	2	1986–1988	104	1,996	496	115	570	19.2	4.8	1.1	5.5	
JamesOn Curry	G	Oklahoma State	1	2009–2010	1	0	0	0	0	0.0	0.0	0.0	0.0	

=== D ===
All-time roster
Player	Pos.	Pre-draft team	Yrs	Seasons	Statistics									Ref.
Player	Pos.	Pre-draft team	Yrs	Seasons	GP	MP	REB	AST	PTS	MPG	RPG	APG	PPG	Ref.
Quintin Dailey	G	San Francisco	3	1986–1989	185	3,928	441	342	2,535	21.2	2.4	1.8	13.7	
Adrian Dantley^	G/F	Notre Dame	1	1976–1977	77	2,816	587	144	1,564	36.6	7.6	1.9	20.3	
Baron Davis	G	UCLA	3	2008–2011	183	6,040	624	1,398	2,665	33.0	3.4	7.6	14.6	
Glen Davis	F/C	LSU	2	2013–2015	97	1,212	238	46	390	12.5	2.5	0.5	4.0	
Mike Davis	G	Virginia Union	2	1970–1972	135	2,685	307	235	1,397	19.9	2.3	1.7	10.3	
Paul Davis	C	Michigan State	3	2006–2009	80	694	158	29	212	8.7	2.0	0.4	2.7	
Ricky Davis	G	Iowa	2	2008–2010	72	1,284	117	121	390	17.8	1.6	1.7	5.4	
Ron Davis	G/F	Washington State	2	1980–1982	71	884	132	51	397	12.5	1.9	0.7	5.6	
Branden Dawson	F	Michigan State	1	2015–2016	6	29	4	0	5	4.8	0.7	0.0	0.8	
Terry Dehere	G	Seton Hall	4	1993–1997	299	5,604	458	811	2,663	18.7	1.5	2.7	8.9	
Sam Dekker	F	Wisconsin	1	2017–2018	73	883	174	38	303	12.1	2.4	0.5	4.2	
Ángel Delgado	C	Seton Hall	1	2018–2019	2	15	4	0	3	7.5	2.0	0.0	1.5	
RayJ Dennis	G	Baylor	1	2025–2026	1	4	2	0	0	4.0	2.0	0.0	0.0	
Moussa Diabaté	C	Michigan	2	2022–2024	33	259	74	8	88	7.8	2.2	0.2	2.7	
Guillermo Díaz	G	Miami (FL)	1	2007–2008	6	18	2	1	5	3.0	0.3	0.2	0.8	
Dan Dickau	G	Gonzaga	1	2007–2008	67	1,040	97	172	352	15.5	1.4	2.6	5.3	
Ernie DiGregorio	G	Providence	4	1973–1977	260	7,253	560	1,457	2,793	27.9	2.2	5.6	10.7	
Ike Diogu	F	Arizona State	1	2010–2011	36	470	115	2	207	13.1	3.2	0.1	5.8	
James Donaldson	C	Washington State	3	1983–1986	178	5,358	1,448	150	2,041	30.1	8.1	0.8	11.5	
Keyon Dooling	G	Missouri	4	2000–2004	203	3,498	243	408	1,217	17.2	1.2	2.0	6.0	
John Douglas	G	Kansas	2	1981–1983	67	1,043	91	147	452	15.6	1.4	2.2	6.7	
Sherman Douglas	G	Syracuse	1	1998–1999	30	842	58	124	247	28.1	1.9	4.1	8.2	
Chris Douglas-Roberts	G	Memphis	1	2014–2015	12	103	12	4	19	8.6	1.0	0.3	1.6	
Larry Drew	G	Missouri	2	1986–1988	134	3,590	222	709	1,506	26.8	1.7	5.3	11.2	
Predrag Drobnjak	C	(Federal Republic of Yugoslavia) Partizan	1	2003–2004	61	949	196	39	382	15.6	3.2	0.6	6.3	
Kevin Duckworth	C	Eastern Illinois	1	1996–1997	26	384	60	16	104	14.8	2.3	0.6	4.0	
Jared Dudley	G/F	Boston College	1	2013–2014	74	1,729	160	104	511	23.4	2.2	1.4	6.9	
Kris Dunn^{x}	G	Providence	2	2024–2026	156	4,013	522	505	1,070	25.7	3.3	3.2	6.9	

=== E to F ===
All-time roster
Player	Pos.	Pre-draft team	Yrs	Seasons	Statistics									Ref.
Player	Pos.	Pre-draft team	Yrs	Seasons	GP	MP	REB	AST	PTS	MPG	RPG	APG	PPG	Ref.
Franklin Edwards	G	Cleveland State	2	1984–1986	89	1,689	100	297	748	19.0	1.1	3.3	8.4	
James Edwards	F/C	Washington	1	1991–1992	72	1,437	202	53	698	20.0	2.8	0.7	9.7	
Jay Edwards	G	Indiana	1	1989–1990	4	26	2	4	7	6.5	0.5	1.0	1.8	
Howard Eisley	G	Boston College	1	2005–2006	13	112	14	25	9	8.6	1.1	1.9	0.7	
Obinna Ekezie	F/C	Maryland	1	2001–2002	29	152	34	3	54	5.2	1.2	0.1	1.9	
Harold Ellis	G	Morehouse	2	1993–1995	118	1,579	241	71	676	13.4	2.0	0.6	5.7	
LeRon Ellis	F/C	Syracuse	1	1991–1992	29	103	24	1	43	3.6	0.8	0.0	1.5	
Melvin Ely	C	Fresno State	2	2002–2004	94	1,312	275	37	393	14.0	2.9	0.4	4.2	
James Ennis III	F	Long Beach State	1	2021–2022	2	28	5	0	20	14.0	2.5	0.0	10.0	
Drew Eubanks	C	Oregon State	1	2024–2025	24	178	58	9	65	7.4	2.4	0.4	2.7	
Jawun Evans	G	Oklahoma State	1	2017–2018	48	778	84	100	231	16.2	1.8	2.1	4.8	
Reggie Evans	F	Iowa	1	2011–2012	56	771	271	17	104	13.8	4.8	0.3	1.9	
Daniel Ewing	G	Duke	2	2005–2007	127	1,683	158	174	431	13.3	1.2	1.4	3.4	
Jordan Farmar	G	UCLA	1	2014–2015	36	529	42	67	167	14.7	1.2	1.9	4.6	
Nick Fazekas	F	Nevada	1	2007–2008	22	260	86	11	103	11.8	3.9	0.5	4.7	
Raymond Felton	G	North Carolina	1	2016–2017	80	1,700	218	191	538	21.3	2.7	2.4	6.7	
Yogi Ferrell	G	Indiana	1	2020–2021	8	96	12	17	37	12.0	1.5	2.1	4.6	
Kenny Fields	G/F	UCLA	2	1986–1988	51	1,015	175	70	433	19.9	3.4	1.4	8.5	
Matt Fish	C	UNC Wilmington	1	1994–1995	26	370	84	17	123	14.2	3.2	0.7	4.7	
Malik Fitts	F	Saint Mary's	1	2020–2021	3	11	3	0	3	3.7	1.0	0.0	1.0	
Trentyn Flowers	F	Combine Academy (NC)	1	2024–2025	6	27	4	0	11	4.5	0.7	0.0	1.8	
Courtney Fortson	G	Arkansas	1	2011–2012	4	46	8	5	17	11.5	2.0	1.3	4.3	
Fred Foster	F	Miami (OH)	1	1976–1977	59	689	76	48	228	11.7	1.3	0.8	3.9	
Tremaine Fowlkes	F	Fresno State	2	2001–2003	59	916	167	40	238	15.5	2.8	0.7	4.0	
Harold Fox	G	Jacksonville	1	1972–1973	10	84	8	10	31	8.4	0.8	1.0	3.1	
Randy Foye	G	Villanova	2	2010–2012	128	3,233	241	316	1,328	25.3	1.9	2.5	10.4	
Richie Frahm	G	Gonzaga	1	2007–2008	10	163	14	8	47	16.3	1.4	0.8	4.7	
Lloyd Free^{+}	G	Guilford	2	1978–1980	146	5,539	539	623	4,299	37.9	3.7	4.3	29.4	

=== G ===
All-time roster
Player	Pos.	Pre-draft team	Yrs	Seasons	Statistics									Ref.
Player	Pos.	Pre-draft team	Yrs	Seasons	GP	MP	REB	AST	PTS	MPG	RPG	APG	PPG	Ref.
Wenyen Gabriel	F	Kentucky	1	2021–2022	6	46	14	2	14	7.7	2.3	0.3	2.3	
Danilo Gallinari	F	(Italy) Olimpia Milano	2	2017–2019	89	2,730	518	219	1,667	30.7	5.8	2.5	18.7	
Darius Garland^{x}	G	Vanderbilt	1	2025–2026	19	552	44	121	378	29.1	2.3	6.4	19.9	
Winston Garland	G	Missouri State	2	1989–1991	97	2,573	301	463	868	26.5	3.1	4.8	8.9	
Dick Garrett	G	Southern Illinois	3	1970–1973	226	6,085	729	646	2,528	26.9	3.2	2.9	11.2	
Tom Garrick	G	Rhode Island	3	1988–1991	211	4,169	445	755	1,222	19.8	2.1	3.6	5.8	
James Garvin	F	Boston University	1	1973–1974	6	11	5	0	2	1.8	0.8	0.0	0.3	
Paul George^{+}	F	Fresno State	5	2019–2024	263	8,758	1,574	1,191	6,049	33.3	6.0	4.5	23.0	
Gus Gerard	G/F	Virginia	2	1976–1978	51	677	131	52	283	13.3	2.6	1.0	5.5	
John Gianelli	F/C	Pacific	1	1976–1977	57	1,283	297	57	397	22.5	5.2	1.0	7.0	
Dick Gibbs	G/F	UTEP	1	1975–1976	72	866	106	49	335	12.0	1.5	0.7	4.7	
Shai Gilgeous-Alexander	G	Kentucky	1	2018–2019	82	2,174	232	270	889	26.5	2.8	3.3	10.8	
Herm Gilliam	G/F	Purdue	1	1970–1971	80	2,082	334	291	898	26.0	4.2	3.6	11.2	
Mike Glenn	G	Southern Illinois	1	1977–1978	56	947	79	78	441	16.9	1.4	1.4	7.9	
Anthony Goldwire	G	Houston	1	2005–2006	3	22	1	2	2	7.3	0.3	0.7	0.7	
Ryan Gomes	F	Providence	2	2010–2012	108	2,520	315	130	621	23.3	2.9	1.2	5.8	
Grant Gondrezick	G	Pepperdine	1	1988–1989	27	244	36	34	105	9.0	1.3	1.3	3.9	
Drew Gooden	F	Kansas	1	2009–2010	24	725	226	21	355	30.2	9.4	0.9	14.8	
Eric Gordon	G	Indiana	4	2008–2011; 2022–2023	218	7,565	562	692	3,785	34.7	2.6	3.2	17.4	
Lancaster Gordon	G	Louisville	4	1984–1988	201	2,581	259	294	1,125	12.8	1.3	1.5	5.6	
Marcin Gortat	F/C	(Germany) RheinEnergie Cologne	1	2018–2019	47	751	261	65	233	16.0	5.6	1.4	5.0	
Danny Granger	F	New Mexico	1	2013–2014	12	194	28	8	96	16.2	2.3	0.7	8.0	
Gary Grant	G	Michigan	7	1988–1995	446	11,234	1,142	2,810	3,899	25.2	2.6	6.3	8.7	
JaMychal Green	F	Alabama	2	2018–2020	87	1,778	545	63	638	20.4	6.3	0.7	7.3	
Jeff Green	F	Georgetown	1	2015–2016	27	709	91	40	293	26.3	3.4	1.5	10.9	
Willie Green	G	Detroit Mercy	2	2012–2014	127	2,057	175	105	723	16.2	1.4	0.8	5.7	
Claude Gregory	F	Wisconsin	1	1987–1988	23	313	95	16	134	13.6	4.1	0.7	5.8	
Blake Griffin^{+}	F	Oklahoma	8	2010–2018	504	17,706	4,686	2,133	10,863	35.1	9.3	4.2	21.6	
Bob Gross	G/F	Long Beach State	1	1982–1983	27	373	66	34	83	13.8	2.4	1.3	3.1	
Matt Guokas	G/F	Saint Joseph's	1	1973–1974	27	549	40	69	132	20.3	1.5	2.6	4.9	

=== H ===
All-time roster
Player	Pos.	Pre-draft team	Yrs	Seasons	Statistics									Ref.
Player	Pos.	Pre-draft team	Yrs	Seasons	GP	MP	REB	AST	PTS	MPG	RPG	APG	PPG	Ref.
Jordan Hamilton	G/F	Texas	1	2014–2015	14	122	16	7	38	8.7	1.1	0.5	2.7	
Zendon Hamilton	F/C	St. John's	1	2000–2001	3	19	8	0	9	6.3	2.7	0.0	3.0	
James Harden^{+}	G	Arizona State	3	2023–2026	195	6,818	1,037	1,659	4,112	35.0	5.3	8.5	21.1	
Maurice Harkless	F	St. John's	1	2019–2020	50	1,141	200	48	275	22.8	4.0	1.0	5.5	
Ron Harper	G/F	Miami (OH)	5	1989–1994	304	11,458	1,678	1,463	5,853	37.7	5.5	4.8	19.3	
Montrezl Harrell	F/C	Louisville	3	2017–2020	221	5,200	1,286	343	3,370	23.5	5.8	1.6	15.2	
Bernie Harris	F	VCU	1	1974–1975	11	25	8	1	5	2.3	0.7	0.1	0.5	
Steve Harris	G	Tulsa	1	1989–1990	15	93	10	1	31	6.2	0.7	0.1	2.1	
Tobias Harris	F	Tennessee	2	2017–2019	87	3,008	625	248	1,770	34.6	7.2	2.9	20.3	
Jason Hart	G	Syracuse	2	2006–2007; 2008–2009	51	1,058	125	136	271	20.7	2.5	2.7	5.3	
Isaiah Hartenstein	C	(Lithuania) Žalgiris Kaunas	1	2021–2022	68	1,216	332	160	563	17.9	4.9	2.4	8.3	
Antonio Harvey	F/C	Pfeiffer	1	1995–1996	37	411	106	6	106	11.1	2.9	0.2	2.9	
Spencer Hawes	F/C	Washington	1	2014–2015	73	1,274	258	88	425	17.5	3.5	1.2	5.8	
Walt Hazzard	G	UCLA	2	1971–1973	81	2,523	223	423	1,190	31.1	2.8	5.2	14.7	
Gar Heard	F	Oklahoma	4	1973–1976; 1980–1981	276	8,195	2,472	618	2,854	29.7	9.0	2.2	10.3	
Bill Hewitt	F	USC	1	1972–1973	73	1,332	368	110	345	18.2	5.0	1.5	4.7	
Armond Hill	G	Princeton	1	1981–1982	19	480	27	81	90	25.3	1.4	4.3	4.7	
Grant Hill^	G/F	Duke	1	2012–2013	29	437	49	26	93	15.1	1.7	0.9	3.2	
Fred Hilton	G/F	Grambling State	2	1971–1973	120	2,080	254	190	1,131	17.3	2.1	1.6	9.4	
Craig Hodges	G	Long Beach State	2	1982–1984	152	3,593	208	391	1,342	23.6	1.4	2.6	8.8	
Lionel Hollins	G	Arizona State	1	1982–1983	56	1,844	128	373	758	32.9	2.3	6.7	13.5	
Ryan Hollins	C	UCLA	2	2012–2014	121	1,145	229	19	347	9.5	1.9	0.2	2.9	
Rodney Hood	G/F	Duke	1	2021–2022	13	128	10	8	34	9.8	0.8	0.6	2.6	
Bill Hosket Jr.	F/C	Ohio State	2	1970–1972	57	809	198	58	325	14.2	3.5	1.0	5.7	
Eddie House	G	Arizona State	1	2003–2004	60	1,188	138	148	409	19.8	2.3	2.5	6.8	
Lester Hudson	G	UT Martin	1	2014–2015	5	56	8	5	18	11.2	1.6	1.0	3.6	
Troy Hudson	G	Southern Illinois	2	1998–2000	87	2,116	203	334	714	24.3	2.3	3.8	8.2	
John Hummer	F/C	Princeton	3	1970–1973	202	5,369	1,269	373	1,724	26.6	6.3	1.8	8.5	
Geoff Huston	G	Texas Tech	1	1986–1987	19	428	17	101	129	22.5	0.9	5.3	6.8	
Bones Hyland	G	VCU	3	2022–2025	71	1,027	128	168	551	14.5	1.8	2.4	7.8	

=== I to J ===
All-time roster
Player	Pos.	Pre-draft team	Yrs	Seasons	Statistics									Ref.
Player	Pos.	Pre-draft team	Yrs	Seasons	GP	MP	REB	AST	PTS	MPG	RPG	APG	PPG	Ref.
Serge Ibaka	F/C	(Spain) L'Hospitalet	2	2020–2022	76	1,493	425	110	686	19.6	5.6	1.4	9.0	
Isaiah Jackson^{x}	C	Kentucky	1	2025–2026	17	270	79	21	127	15.9	4.6	1.2	7.5	
Jaren Jackson	G/F	Georgetown	1	1992–1993	34	350	39	35	131	10.3	1.1	1.0	3.9	
Luke Jackson	F	Oregon	1	2006–2007	3	16	1	4	3	5.3	0.3	1.3	1.0	
Mark Jackson	G	St. John's	2	1992–1994	161	5,828	736	1,402	2,046	36.2	4.6	8.7	12.7	
Reggie Jackson	G	Boston College	4	2019–2023	211	5,581	630	801	2,705	26.5	3.0	3.8	12.8	
Stephen Jackson	G/F	Butler CC	1	2013–2014	9	107	10	5	15	11.9	1.1	0.6	1.7	
Henry James	F	St. Mary's (TX)	1	1993–1994	12	75	14	1	41	6.3	1.2	0.1	3.4	
Antawn Jamison	F	North Carolina	1	2013–2014	22	248	55	7	84	11.3	2.5	0.3	3.8	
Harold Jamison	F	Clemson	1	2001–2002	25	176	39	6	54	7.0	1.6	0.2	2.2	
Marko Jarić	G	(Italy) Fortitudo Bologna	3	2002–2005	174	4,795	496	777	1,478	27.6	2.9	4.5	8.5	
Brice Johnson	F	North Carolina	2	2016–2018	12	47	16	2	20	3.9	1.3	0.2	1.7	
George Johnson	F/C	Dillard	1	1976–1977	39	1,055	400	78	296	27.1	10.3	2.0	7.6	
Keon Johnson	G	Tennessee	1	2021–2022	15	135	21	13	53	9.0	1.4	0.9	3.5	
Larry Johnson	G	Kentucky	1	1977–1978	4	38	5	7	6	9.5	1.3	1.8	1.5	
Marques Johnson^{+}	G/F	UCLA	3	1984–1987	157	5,355	877	559	2,872	34.1	5.6	3.6	18.3	
Steffond Johnson	F	San Diego State	1	1986–1987	29	234	43	5	74	8.1	1.5	0.2	2.6	
Wesley Johnson	G/F	Syracuse	3	2015–2018	222	3,962	645	133	1,138	17.8	2.9	0.6	5.1	
Charles Jones	G	LIU Brooklyn	1	1999–2000	56	662	62	94	188	11.8	1.1	1.7	3.4	
Dahntay Jones	G/F	Duke	1	2014–2015	33	123	11	2	21	3.7	0.3	0.1	0.6	
Derrick Jones Jr.^{x}	F	UNLV	2	2024–2026	127	3,223	436	129	1,285	25.4	3.4	1.0	10.1	
Fred Jones	G/F	Oregon	1	2008–2009	52	1,495	126	188	378	28.8	2.4	3.6	7.3	
Hutch Jones	F	Vanderbilt	2	1982–1984	13	103	17	4	41	7.9	1.3	0.3	3.2	
Kai Jones	C	Texas	1	2024–2025	28	208	46	10	61	7.4	1.6	0.4	2.2	
Ozell Jones	F/C	Cal State Fullerton	1	1985–1986	3	18	2	0	0	6.0	0.7	0.0	0.0	
Solomon Jones	F	South Florida	1	2011–2012	10	96	17	2	6	9.6	1.7	0.2	0.6	
Wil Jones	F	Albany State	1	1977–1978	79	1,711	334	116	536	21.7	4.2	1.5	6.8	
DeAndre Jordan^{+}	C	Texas A&M	10	2008–2018	750	21,045	7,988	557	7,078	28.1	10.7	0.7	9.4	

=== K to L ===
All-time roster
Player	Pos.	Pre-draft team	Yrs	Seasons	Statistics									Ref.
Player	Pos.	Pre-draft team	Yrs	Seasons	GP	MP	REB	AST	PTS	MPG	RPG	APG	PPG	Ref.
Mfiondu Kabengele	F/C	Florida State	2	2019–2021	35	158	25	7	69	4.5	0.7	0.2	2.0	
Chris Kaman^{+}	C	Central Michigan	8	2003–2011	493	14,661	4,109	635	5,813	29.7	8.3	1.3	11.8	
Bob Kauffman	F/C	Guilford	4	1970–1974	306	10,336	2,805	1,189	4,847	33.8	9.2	3.9	15.8	
Greg Kelser	F	Michigan State	1	1983–1984	80	1,783	391	91	878	22.3	4.9	1.1	11.0	
Tim Kempton	F/C	Notre Dame	1	1986–1987	66	936	194	53	289	14.2	2.9	0.8	4.4	
Luke Kennard	G/F	Duke	3	2020–2023	168	3,876	473	287	1,627	23.1	2.8	1.7	9.7	
Sean Kilpatrick	G	Cincinnati	1	2017–2018	4	38	2	3	19	9.5	0.5	0.8	4.8	
Bo Kimble	G	Loyola Marymount	2	1990–1992	96	1,281	151	93	541	13.3	1.6	1.0	5.6	
Greg Kite	C	BYU	2	1987–1989	98	1,706	430	74	317	17.4	4.4	0.8	3.2	
Kerry Kittles	G	Villanova	1	2004–2005	11	243	32	20	69	22.1	2.9	1.8	6.3	
Billy Knight	G/F	Pittsburgh	1	1977–1978	53	2,155	383	161	1,215	40.7	7.2	3.0	22.9	
Brevin Knight	G	Stanford	1	2007–2008	74	1,674	142	328	338	22.6	1.9	4.4	4.6	
Howard Komives	G	Bowling Green	1	1972–1973	67	1,468	118	239	411	21.9	1.8	3.6	6.1	
Yanic Konan Niederhäuser^{x}	C	Penn State	1	2025–2026	41	424	117	12	176	10.3	2.9	0.3	4.3	
Yaroslav Korolev	F	(Russia) CSKA Moscow	2	2005–2007	34	168	16	13	39	4.9	0.5	0.4	1.1	
Steve Kuberski	F/C	Bradley	1	1975–1976	10	85	25	3	17	8.5	2.5	0.3	1.7	
Kevin Kunnert	F/C	Iowa	2	1973–1974; 1978–1979	120	2,024	675	138	633	16.9	5.6	1.2	5.3	
Rock Lee	C	San Diego State	1	1981–1982	2	10	1	2	2	5.0	0.5	1.0	1.0	
Kawhi Leonard*	F	San Diego State	6	2019–2021; 2022–2026	331	10,964	2,125	1,347	8,296	33.1	6.4	4.1	25.1	
Jim Les	G	Bradley	1	1989–1990	6	86	7	20	21	14.3	1.2	3.3	3.5	
Travis Leslie	G	Georgia	1	2011–2012	10	45	9	5	14	4.5	0.9	0.5	1.4	
Randy Livingston	G	LSU	1	2003–2004	4	48	7	4	8	12.0	1.8	1.0	2.0	
Shaun Livingston	G	Peoria HS (IL)	3	2004–2007	145	3,950	456	698	1,077	27.2	3.1	4.8	7.4	
Scott Lloyd	F/C	Arizona State	2	1977–1979	61	597	122	35	179	9.8	2.0	0.6	2.9	
Rob Lock	F	Kentucky	1	1988–1989	20	110	32	4	30	5.5	1.6	0.2	1.5	
Kevin Loder	G/F	Alabama State	1	1983–1984	1	4	0	0	0	4.0	0.0	0.0	0.0	
Paul Long	G	Wake Forest	1	1970–1971	30	213	31	25	134	7.1	1.0	0.8	4.5	
Brook Lopez^{x}	C	Stanford	1	2025–2026	75	1,635	273	97	634	21.8	3.6	1.3	8.5	
Mike Lynn	F	UCLA	1	1970–1971	5	25	4	1	7	5.0	0.8	0.2	1.4	

=== M ===
All-time roster
Player	Pos.	Pre-draft team	Yrs	Seasons	Statistics									Ref.
Player	Pos.	Pre-draft team	Yrs	Seasons	GP	MP	REB	AST	PTS	MPG	RPG	APG	PPG	Ref.
Mike Macaluso	F	Canisius	1	1973–1974	30	112	25	3	48	3.7	0.8	0.1	1.6	
Corey Maggette	F	Duke	8	2000–2008	512	15,780	2,673	1,229	8,835	30.8	5.2	2.4	17.3	
Moses Malone^	F/C	Petersburg HS (VA)	1	1976–1977	2	6	1	0	0	3.0	0.5	0.0	0.0	
Steve Malovic	F	San Diego State	1	1979–1980	28	277	58	12	53	9.9	2.1	0.4	1.9	
Terance Mann	G/F	Florida State	6	2019–2025	382	8,419	1,359	728	3,037	22.0	3.6	1.9	8.0	
Danny Manning^{+}	F/C	Kansas	6	1988–1994	373	12,676	2,399	1,132	7,120	34.0	6.4	3.0	19.1	
Rich Manning	C	Washington	1	1996–1997	10	73	16	1	31	7.3	1.6	0.1	3.1	
Jack Marin	G/F	Duke	3	1973–1976	120	3,105	525	202	1,423	25.9	4.4	1.7	11.9	
Boban Marjanović	C	(Serbia) Hemofarm	2	2017–2019	56	542	239	30	359	9.7	4.3	0.5	6.4	
Bob Martin	C	Minnesota	2	1993–1995	54	549	119	18	113	10.2	2.2	0.3	2.1	
Darrick Martin	G	UCLA	4	1996–1999; 2004–2005	212	5,250	335	842	2,072	24.8	1.6	4.0	9.8	
Jeff Martin	G	Murray State	2	1989–1991	143	2,685	290	109	956	18.8	2.0	0.8	6.7	
Kenyon Martin	F	Cincinnati	1	2011–2012	42	940	181	18	217	22.4	4.3	0.4	5.2	
Kenyon Martin Jr.	F	IMG Academy (FL)	1	2023–2024	2	31	3	1	10	15.5	1.5	0.5	5.0	
Tony Massenburg	F	Maryland	1	1994–1995	80	2,127	455	67	741	26.6	5.7	0.8	9.3	
Bennedict Mathurin^{x}	F	Arizona	1	2025–2026	26	729	142	66	452	28.0	5.5	2.5	17.4	
Cedric Maxwell	F	Charlotte	2	1985–1987	111	3,590	875	337	1,552	32.3	7.9	3.0	14.0	
Don May	F	Dayton	1	1970–1971	76	2,666	567	150	1,535	35.1	7.5	2.0	20.2	
Clyde Mayes	F	Furman	1	1976–1977	2	7	3	0	2	3.5	1.5	0.0	1.0	
Tharon Mayes	G	Florida State	1	1991–1992	3	40	1	3	9	13.3	0.3	1.0	3.0	
Luc Mbah a Moute	F	UCLA	3	2015–2017; 2018–2019	159	3,122	348	71	735	19.6	2.2	0.4	4.6	
Bob McAdoo^	F/C	North Carolina	5	1972–1977	334	13,381	4,229	868	9,434	40.1	12.7	2.6	28.2	
Walter McCarty	F	Kentucky	1	2005–2006	36	353	68	23	88	9.8	1.9	0.6	2.4	
Ted McClain	G	Tennessee State	1	1977–1978	41	727	75	123	212	17.7	1.8	3.0	5.2	
Jim McDaniels	F/C	Western Kentucky	1	1977–1978	42	694	181	44	236	16.5	4.3	1.0	5.6	
Hank McDowell	F/C	Memphis	1	1983–1984	57	611	155	37	208	10.7	2.7	0.6	3.6	
Rodney McGruder	G	Kansas State	1	2019–2020	56	871	151	36	187	15.6	2.7	0.6	3.3	
Jeff McInnis	G	North Carolina	3	1999–2002	187	6,458	505	1,036	2,410	34.5	2.7	5.5	12.9	
Billy McKinney	G	Northwestern	1	1983–1984	80	843	54	161	311	10.5	0.7	2.0	3.9	
Carlton McKinney	G	SMU	1	1989–1990	7	104	12	7	18	14.9	1.7	1.0	2.6	
Tom McMillen	F/C	Maryland	2	1975–1977	70	978	258	85	349	14.0	3.7	1.2	5.0	
Jim McMillian	F	Columbia	3	1973–1976	218	8,064	1,385	617	3,585	37.0	6.4	2.8	16.4	
Larry McNeill	F/C	Marquette	1	1977–1978	37	873	188	45	442	23.6	5.1	1.2	11.9	
Darius Miles	F	East St. Louis HS (IL)	2	2000–2002	163	4,360	930	283	1,540	26.7	5.7	1.7	9.4	
Andre Miller	G	Utah	1	2002–2003	80	2,913	316	537	1,088	36.4	4.0	6.7	13.6	
Jordan Miller^{x}	F	Miami (FL)	3	2023–2026	105	1,773	245	170	763	16.9	2.3	1.6	7.3	
Patty Mills	G	Saint Mary's	1	2024–2025	12	61	1	5	37	5.1	0.1	0.4	3.1	
Cuttino Mobley	G	Rhode Island	4	2005–2009	245	8,887	912	650	3,382	36.3	3.7	2.7	13.8	
Jamario Moon	F	Meridian CC	1	2010–2011	19	278	47	7	66	14.6	2.5	0.4	3.5	
Xavier Moon	G	Morehead State	3	2021–2024	28	276	35	50	98	9.9	1.3	1.8	3.5	
Lowes Moore	G	West Virginia	1	1982–1983	37	642	55	73	210	17.4	1.5	2.0	5.7	
Mikki Moore	F/C	Nebraska	1	2004–2005	74	1,178	246	47	396	15.9	3.3	0.6	5.4	
Darius Morris	G	Michigan	1	2013–2014	10	54	5	5	9	5.4	0.5	0.5	0.9	
Marcus Morris Sr.	F	Kansas	4	2019–2023	195	5,440	809	312	2,515	27.9	4.1	1.6	12.9	
Johnathan Motley	F	Baylor	2	2018–2020	35	197	61	19	130	5.6	1.7	0.5	3.7	
Byron Mullens	C	Ohio State	1	2013–2014	27	167	32	6	67	6.2	1.2	0.2	2.5	
Eric Murdock	G	Providence	1	1999–2000	40	693	77	108	225	17.3	1.9	2.7	5.6	
Jay Murphy	F	Boston College	2	1984–1986	37	249	56	7	69	6.7	1.5	0.2	1.9	
Tod Murphy	F/C	UC Irvine	1	1987–1988	1	19	2	2	5	19.0	2.0	2.0	5.0	
Lamond Murray	F	California	5	1994–1999	361	9,563	1,512	477	4,173	26.5	4.2	1.3	11.6	

=== N to P ===
All-time roster
Player	Pos.	Pre-draft team	Yrs	Seasons	Statistics									Ref.
Player	Pos.	Pre-draft team	Yrs	Seasons	GP	MP	REB	AST	PTS	MPG	RPG	APG	PPG	Ref.
Mamadou N'Diaye	C	Auburn	1	2004–2005	11	72	18	1	20	6.5	1.6	0.1	1.8	
Boniface N'Dong	C	(Germany) SpVgg Rattelsdorf	1	2005–2006	23	152	37	7	50	6.6	1.6	0.3	2.2	
Swen Nater	C	UCLA	6	1977–1983	348	11,079	4,168	819	4,694	31.8	12.0	2.4	13.5	
Tyrone Nesby	F	UNLV	3	1998–2001	137	3,938	492	214	1,584	28.7	3.6	1.6	11.6	
Martin Nessley	C	Duke	1	1987–1988	35	295	73	16	43	8.4	2.1	0.5	1.2	
Johnny Neumann	G/F	Ole Miss	1	1976–1977	4	49	9	4	35	12.3	2.3	1.0	8.8	
Kurt Nimphius	F/C	Arizona State	2	1985–1987	105	2,757	526	66	1,100	26.3	5.0	0.6	10.5	
Norm Nixon^{+}	G	Duquesne	4	1983–1986; 1988–1989	283	9,403	679	2,540	4,127	33.2	2.4	9.0	14.6	
Joakim Noah	C	Florida	1	2019–2020	5	50	16	7	14	10.0	3.2	1.4	2.8	
Coniel Norman	G	Arizona	1	1978–1979	22	323	32	24	161	14.7	1.5	1.1	7.3	
Ken Norman	F	Illinois	6	1987–1993	439	13,584	2,916	964	6,432	30.9	6.6	2.2	14.7	
Steve Novak	F	Marquette	2	2008–2010	125	1,523	158	46	605	12.2	1.3	0.4	4.8	
Lamar Odom	F	Rhode Island	5	1999–2003; 2012–2013	312	9,897	2,169	1,200	3,986	31.7	7.0	3.8	12.8	
Semi Ojeleye	F	SMU	1	2021–2022	10	98	16	4	41	9.8	1.6	0.4	4.1	
John Olive	F	Villanova	2	1978–1980	35	204	20	3	44	5.8	0.6	0.1	1.3	
Michael Olowokandi	C	Pacific	5	1998–2003	323	9,836	2,577	246	3,211	30.5	8.0	0.8	9.9	
Norchad Omier^{x}	F/C	Baylor	1	2025–2026	6	24	7	2	17	4.0	1.2	0.3	2.8	
Daniel Oturu	C	Minnesota	1	2020–2021	30	161	48	10	54	5.4	1.6	0.3	1.8	
Bo Outlaw	F	Houston	4	1993–1997	280	5,706	1,179	327	1,590	20.4	4.2	1.2	5.7	
Travis Outlaw	F	Starkville HS (MS)	1	2009–2010	23	499	83	26	200	21.7	3.6	1.1	8.7	
Doug Overton	G	La Salle	2	2001–2002; 2003–2004	73	1,141	97	147	255	15.6	1.3	2.0	3.5	
Eddie Owens	F	UNLV	1	1977–1978	8	63	10	5	21	7.9	1.3	0.6	2.6	
Smush Parker	G	Fordham	1	2007–2008	19	409	32	69	122	21.5	1.7	3.6	6.4	
Cherokee Parks	F/C	Duke	2	2000–2001; 2002–2003	82	1,524	321	60	439	18.6	3.9	0.7	5.4	
Patrick Patterson	F	Kentucky	2	2019–2021	97	1,358	226	70	489	14.0	2.3	0.7	5.0	
Ruben Patterson	F	Cincinnati	1	2007–2008	20	327	64	17	102	16.4	3.2	0.9	5.1	
Chris Paul^{+}	G	Wake Forest	7	2011–2017; 2025–2026	425	14,113	1,761	4,076	7,721	33.2	4.1	9.6	18.2	
Sean Pedulla^{x}	G	Ole Miss	1	2025–2026	7	31	3	5	13	4.4	0.4	0.7	1.9	
Kirk Penney	G	Wisconsin	1	2004–2005	4	12	1	1	2	3.0	0.3	0.3	0.5	
Elliot Perry	G	Memphis	1	1991–1992	10	66	7	14	13	6.6	0.7	1.4	1.3	
Mike Phelps	G	Alcorn State	1	1987–1988	2	23	2	3	9	11.5	1.0	1.5	4.5	
Eric Piatkowski	G/F	Nebraska	9	1994–2003	616	12,655	1,520	674	5,269	20.5	2.5	1.1	8.6	
Paul Pierce^	G/F	Kansas	2	2015–2017	93	1,508	234	81	498	16.2	2.5	0.9	5.4	
Ricky Pierce	G	Rice	1	1983–1984	69	1,280	135	60	685	18.6	2.0	0.9	9.9	
Stan Pietkiewicz	G/F	Auburn	3	1978–1981	60	639	52	99	236	10.7	0.9	1.7	3.9	
Mason Plumlee	C	Duke	2	2022–2024	69	1,131	393	95	416	16.4	5.7	1.4	6.0	
Dwayne Polee	G	Pepperdine	1	1986–1987	1	6	0	0	2	6.0	0.0	0.0	2.0	
Olden Polynice	F/C	Virginia	3	1990–1992; 2003–2004	109	2,978	821	73	994	27.3	7.5	0.7	9.1	
Dave Popson	F/C	North Carolina	1	1988–1989	10	68	16	6	23	6.8	1.6	0.6	2.3	
Kevin Porter Jr.	G	USC	1	2024–2025	45	884	160	144	419	19.6	3.6	3.2	9.3	
Josh Powell	F	NC State	1	2007–2008	64	1,228	331	47	353	19.2	5.2	0.7	5.5	
Norman Powell	G	UCLA	4	2021–2025	201	5,640	574	330	3,488	28.1	2.9	1.6	17.4	
Jason Preston	G	Ohio	1	2022–2023	14	124	22	27	41	8.9	1.6	1.9	2.9	
Jim Price	G	Louisville	1	1976–1977	20	333	34	38	105	16.7	1.7	1.9	5.3	
Tony Price	G	Penn	1	1980–1981	5	29	0	3	4	5.8	0.0	0.6	0.8	
Pablo Prigioni	G	(Argentina) Obras Sanitarias	1	2015–2016	59	823	114	130	145	13.9	1.9	2.2	2.5	
Joshua Primo	G	Alabama	1	2023–2024	2	10	1	0	2	5.0	0.5	0.0	1.0	

=== R ===
All-time roster
Player	Pos.	Pre-draft team	Yrs	Seasons	Statistics									Ref.
Player	Pos.	Pre-draft team	Yrs	Seasons	GP	MP	REB	AST	PTS	MPG	RPG	APG	PPG	Ref.
Vladimir Radmanović	F	(Federal Republic of Yugoslavia) FMP	1	2005–2006	30	885	171	64	320	29.5	5.7	2.1	10.7	
Zach Randolph	F/C	Michigan State	1	2008–2009	39	1,369	367	88	815	35.1	9.4	2.3	20.9	
Wally Rank	G/F	San Jose State	1	1980–1981	25	153	30	17	55	6.1	1.2	0.7	2.2	
Željko Rebrača	C	(Federal Republic of Yugoslavia) Partizan	2	2004–2006	87	1,340	248	35	474	15.4	2.9	0.4	5.4	
Eldridge Recasner	G	Washington	1	2001–2002	5	31	0	5	5	6.2	0.0	1.0	1.0	
JJ Redick	G	Duke	4	2013–2017	266	7,691	551	431	4,208	28.9	2.1	1.6	15.8	
Willie Reed	F/C	Saint Louis	1	2017–2018	39	419	120	9	193	10.7	3.1	0.2	4.9	
Glen Rice	F	Michigan	1	2003–2004	18	262	41	24	66	14.6	2.3	1.3	3.7	
Pooh Richardson	G	UCLA	5	1994–1999	282	7,324	626	1,397	2,255	26.0	2.2	5.0	8.0	
Quentin Richardson	G	DePaul	4	2000–2004	281	7,216	1,286	381	3,362	25.7	4.6	1.4	12.0	
Eric Riley	C	Michigan	1	1994–1995	40	434	112	11	177	10.9	2.8	0.3	4.4	
Austin Rivers	G	Duke	4	2014–2018	243	6,366	520	613	2,693	26.2	2.1	2.5	11.1	
David Rivers	G	Notre Dame	2	1989–1990; 1991–1992	67	846	104	176	249	12.6	1.6	2.6	3.7	
Doc Rivers	G	Marquette	1	1991–1992	59	1,657	147	233	641	28.1	2.5	3.9	10.9	
Stanley Roberts	C	LSU	4	1992–1994; 1995–1997	160	3,339	824	120	1,501	20.9	5.2	0.8	9.4	
James Robinson	G	Alabama	2	1997–1999	84	1,511	138	153	647	18.0	1.6	1.8	7.7	
Jerome Robinson	G	Boston College	2	2018–2020	75	796	101	65	234	10.6	1.3	0.9	3.1	
Nate Robinson	G	Washington	1	2014–2015	9	126	11	20	46	14.0	1.2	2.2	5.1	
Rodney Rogers	F	Wake Forest	4	1995–1999	271	7,897	1,300	668	3,343	29.1	4.8	2.5	12.3	
Rajon Rondo	F	Kentucky	1	2020–2021	18	368	55	104	136	20.4	3.1	5.8	7.6	
Sean Rooks	C	Arizona	3	2000–2003	213	3,625	643	171	926	17.0	3.0	0.8	4.3	
Robert Rose	G	George Mason	1	1988–1989	2	3	2	0	0	1.5	1.0	0.0	0.0	
Quinton Ross	G	SMU	4	2004–2008	302	6,379	742	362	1,449	21.1	2.5	1.2	4.8	
Paul Ruffner	F/C	BYU	2	1973–1975	42	154	33	7	75	3.7	0.8	0.2	1.8	
Kareem Rush	G	Missouri	1	2009–2010	7	58	6	4	9	8.3	0.9	0.6	1.3	

=== S ===
All-time roster
Player	Pos.	Pre-draft team	Yrs	Seasons	Statistics									Ref.
Player	Pos.	Pre-draft team	Yrs	Seasons	GP	MP	REB	AST	PTS	MPG	RPG	APG	PPG	Ref.
Cheikh Samb	C	(Spain) WTC Cornellá	1	2008–2009	10	51	13	0	11	5.1	1.3	0.0	1.1	
Kobe Sanders^{x}	G	Nevada	1	2025–2026	68	1,351	153	109	495	19.9	2.3	1.6	7.3	
Dwayne Schintzius	C	Florida	1	1996–1997	15	116	22	4	34	7.7	1.5	0.3	2.3	
Dale Schlueter	C	Colorado State	2	1974–1976	147	1,735	488	184	444	11.8	3.3	1.3	3.0	
Mike Scott	F	Virginia	1	2018–2019	52	748	174	44	248	14.4	3.3	0.8	4.8	
Jay Scrubb	G/F	John A. Logan	2	2020–2022	22	205	30	9	84	9.3	1.4	0.4	3.8	
Malik Sealy	G	St. John's	3	1994–1997	202	5,661	692	388	2,569	28.0	3.4	1.9	12.7	
Landry Shamet	G	Wichita State	2	2018–2020	78	2,146	156	157	765	27.5	2.0	2.0	9.8	
John Shumate	F/C	Notre Dame	3	1975–1978	124	4,237	1,143	282	1,729	34.2	9.2	2.3	13.9	
Mike Silliman	F	Army	1	1970–1971	36	366	62	23	91	10.2	1.7	0.6	2.5	
Ben Simmons	G	LSU	1	2024–2025	18	295	69	56	52	16.4	3.8	3.1	2.9	
Bobby Simmons	G/F	DePaul	3	2003–2005; 2011–2012	159	4,593	763	312	1,746	28.9	4.8	2.0	11.0	
James Singleton	F	Murray State	2	2005–2007	112	1,129	303	46	288	10.1	2.7	0.4	2.6	
Brian Skinner	F	Baylor	5	1998–2001; 2008–2010	160	2,583	652	57	665	16.1	4.1	0.4	4.2	
Bingo Smith	G/F	Tulsa	1	1979–1980	70	1,988	245	93	819	28.4	3.5	1.3	11.7	
Charles Smith	F/C	Pittsburgh	4	1988–1992	272	8,906	1,898	407	4,994	32.7	7.0	1.5	18.4	
Charles Smith	G	New Mexico	2	1997–1999	46	577	43	32	193	12.5	0.9	0.7	4.2	
Craig Smith	F	Boston College	2	2009–2011	123	1,818	404	115	843	14.8	3.3	0.9	6.9	
Derek Smith	G/F	Louisville	3	1983–1986	152	4,398	638	329	2,626	28.9	4.2	2.2	17.3	
Elmore Smith	C	Kentucky State	2	1971–1973	154	6,015	2,130	303	2,740	39.1	13.8	2.0	17.8	
Jim Smith	F	Ohio State	1	1981–1982	72	858	182	46	211	11.9	2.5	0.6	2.9	
Josh Smith	F	Oak Hill Academy (VA)	1	2015–2016	32	459	125	42	181	14.3	3.9	1.3	5.7	
Michael Smith	F	BYU	1	1994–1995	29	319	56	20	153	11.0	1.9	0.7	5.3	
Phil Smith	G	San Francisco	2	1980–1982	124	3,824	273	605	1,913	30.8	2.2	4.9	15.4	
Randy Smith^{+}	G/F	Buffalo State	9	1971–1979; 1982–1983	715	24,393	2,985	3,498	12,735	34.1	4.2	4.9	17.8	
Robert Smith	G	UNLV	1	1982–1983	5	43	3	6	11	8.6	0.6	1.2	2.2	
Mike Smrek	C	Canisius	1	1990–1991	10	70	19	3	10	7.0	1.9	0.3	1.0	
Marreese Speights	F/C	Florida	1	2016–2017	82	1,286	373	65	711	15.7	4.5	0.8	8.7	
Elmore Spencer	C	UNLV	3	1992–1995	139	2,578	542	108	909	18.5	3.9	0.8	6.5	
Lance Stephenson	G/F	Cincinnati	1	2015–2016	43	680	108	60	204	15.8	2.5	1.4	4.7	
Alex Stepheson	F	USC	1	2015–2016	4	12	2	0	2	3.0	0.5	0.0	0.5	
Alex Stivrins	F	Colorado	1	1992–1993	1	1	0	0	0	1.0	0.0	0.0	0.0	
Diamond Stone	C	Maryland	1	2016–2017	7	24	6	0	10	3.4	0.9	0.0	1.4	
Derek Strong	F	Xavier	1	2000–2001	28	491	108	7	118	17.5	3.9	0.3	4.2	
DaJuan Summers	F	Georgetown	1	2012–2013	2	7	2	1	2	3.5	1.0	0.5	1.0	
Barry Sumpter	F/C	Austin Peay	1	1988–1989	1	1	0	0	0	1.0	0.0	0.0	0.0	

=== T to V ===
All-time roster
Player	Pos.	Pre-draft team	Yrs	Seasons	Statistics									Ref.
Player	Pos.	Pre-draft team	Yrs	Seasons	GP	MP	REB	AST	PTS	MPG	RPG	APG	PPG	Ref.
Brian Taylor	G	Princeton	4	1978–1982	219	6,552	461	1,024	2,385	29.9	2.1	4.7	10.9	
Maurice Taylor	F	Michigan	3	1997–2000	179	5,245	938	221	2,648	29.3	5.2	1.2	14.8	
Mike Taylor	G	Iowa State	1	2008–2009	51	771	87	106	289	15.1	1.7	2.1	5.7	
Sebastian Telfair	G	Abraham Lincoln HS (NY)	1	2009–2010	39	582	41	114	169	14.9	1.1	2.9	4.3	
Jahmyl Telfort	F	Butler	1	2025–2026	8	32	3	1	1	4.0	0.4	0.1	0.1	
Garrett Temple	G	LSU	1	2018–2019	26	510	64	37	123	19.6	2.5	1.4	4.7	
Miloš Teodosić	G	(Greece) Olympiacos	2	2017–2019	60	1,284	142	241	477	21.4	2.4	4.0	8.0	
Claude Terry	G/F	Stanford	1	1976–1977	33	304	28	33	116	9.2	0.8	1.0	3.5	
Daniel Theis	F/C	(Germany) Ratiopharm Ulm	1	2023–2024	59	1,007	244	61	374	17.1	4.1	1.0	6.3	
Jim Thomas	G	Indiana	1	1985–1986	6	69	8	12	13	11.5	1.3	2.0	2.2	
Tim Thomas	F	Villanova	3	2006–2009	149	4,214	747	352	1,711	28.3	5.0	2.4	11.5	
Trey Thompkins	F	Georgia	1	2011–2012	24	119	24	3	57	5.0	1.0	0.1	2.4	
Al Thornton	F	Florida State	3	2007–2010	201	6,217	918	262	2,747	30.9	4.6	1.3	13.7	
Sindarius Thornwell	G	South Carolina	2	2017–2019	137	1,469	184	86	344	10.7	1.3	0.6	2.5	
Tom Tolbert	F/C	Arizona	1	1993–1994	49	640	108	30	187	13.1	2.2	0.6	3.8	
Keith Tower	F/C	Notre Dame	1	1995–1996	34	305	51	5	82	9.0	1.5	0.1	2.4	
Linton Townes	G/F	James Madison	1	1983–1984	2	17	1	1	6	8.5	0.5	0.5	3.0	
P. J. Tucker	F	Texas	1	2023–2024	28	420	71	16	46	15.0	2.5	0.6	1.6	
Ronny Turiaf	F	Gonzaga	1	2012–2013	65	701	152	35	121	10.8	2.3	0.5	1.9	
Hedo Türkoğlu	F	(Turkey) Efes Pilsen	2	2013–2015	100	1,097	188	70	347	11.0	1.9	0.7	3.5	
Andre Turner	G	Memphis	1	1989–1990	3	31	5	3	4	10.3	1.7	1.0	1.3	
Ekpe Udoh	F/C	Baylor	1	2014–2015	33	128	26	8	29	3.9	0.8	0.2	0.9	
Darnell Valentine	G	Kansas	3	1985–1988	178	3,878	359	936	1,488	21.8	2.0	5.3	8.4	
Logan Vander Velden	F	Green Bay	1	1995–1996	15	31	6	1	9	2.1	0.4	0.1	0.6	
Kiki VanDeWeghe	F	UCLA	1	1992–1993	41	494	48	25	254	12.0	1.2	0.6	6.2	
Loy Vaught	F	Michigan	8	1990–1998	558	15,671	4,471	607	6,614	28.1	8.0	1.1	11.9	
Stojko Vranković	C	(Socialist Federal Republic of Yugoslavia) Zadar	2	1997–1999	67	1,008	269	36	197	15.0	4.0	0.5	2.9	
Sasha Vujačić	G	(Italy) Snaidero Udine	1	2013–2014	2	10	3	0	5	5.0	1.5	0.0	2.5	

=== W to Z ===
All-time roster
Player	Pos.	Pre-draft team	Yrs	Seasons	Statistics									Ref.
Player	Pos.	Pre-draft team	Yrs	Seasons	GP	MP	REB	AST	PTS	MPG	RPG	APG	PPG	Ref.
Von Wafer	G	Florida State	1	2006–2007	1	1	0	0	0	1.0	0.0	0.0	0.0	
John Wall	G	Kentucky	1	2022–2023	34	755	92	178	386	22.2	2.7	5.2	11.4	
Tyrone Wallace	G	California	2	2017–2019	92	1,479	206	113	509	16.1	2.2	1.2	5.5	
Bill Walton^	F/C	UCLA	4	1979–1980; 1982–1984	169	4,559	1,526	493	2,003	27.0	9.0	2.9	11.9	
Derrick Walton	G	Michigan	1	2019–2020	23	222	15	22	50	9.7	0.7	1.0	2.2	
Wang Zhizhi	C	(China) Bayi Rockets	2	2002–2004	43	421	81	10	186	9.8	1.9	0.2	4.3	
Cornell Warner	F/C	Jackson State	3	1970–1973	131	2,579	846	113	790	19.7	6.5	0.9	6.0	
Willie Warren	G	Oklahoma	1	2010–2011	19	134	12	27	37	7.1	0.6	1.4	1.9	
Bryan Warrick	G	Saint Joseph's	1	1984–1985	58	713	58	153	215	12.3	1.0	2.6	3.7	
Duane Washington	G	Middle Tennessee	1	1992–1993	4	28	2	5	0	7.0	0.5	1.3	0.0	
Jim Washington	F/C	Villanova	2	1974–1976	43	681	198	44	175	15.8	4.6	1.0	4.1	
Kermit Washington	F/C	American	1	1978–1979	82	2,764	800	125	927	33.7	9.8	1.5	11.3	
TyTy Washington Jr.^{x}	G	Kentucky	1	2025–2026	16	88	6	17	21	5.5	0.4	1.1	1.3	
Maalik Wayns	G	Villanova	2	2012–2014	8	46	4	9	22	5.8	0.5	1.1	2.8	
Nick Weatherspoon	F	Illinois	2	1978–1980	139	3,766	662	189	1,525	27.1	4.8	1.4	11.0	
Bob Weiss	G	Penn State	2	1974–1976	142	2,333	170	410	471	16.4	1.2	2.9	3.3	
Russell Westbrook	G	UCLA	2	2022–2024	89	2,164	445	466	1,086	24.3	5.0	5.2	12.2	
Ennis Whatley	G	Alabama	1	1988–1989	8	90	16	22	34	11.3	2.0	2.8	4.3	
Eric White	F	Pepperdine	2	1987–1989	54	786	132	26	336	14.6	2.4	0.5	6.2	
Rory White	F	South Alabama	4	1983–1987	229	4,431	574	187	1,885	19.3	2.5	0.8	8.2	
Jerome Whitehead	F/C	Marquette	6	1978–1984	275	4,979	1,473	200	2,024	18.1	5.4	0.7	7.4	
Sidney Wicks	F/C	UCLA	3	1978–1981	199	5,251	1,037	450	1,600	26.4	5.2	2.3	8.0	
C. J. Wilcox	G	Washington	2	2014–2016	44	268	19	18	111	6.1	0.4	0.4	2.5	
Chris Wilcox	F	Maryland	4	2002–2006	213	3,481	810	128	1,374	16.3	3.8	0.6	6.5	
Michael Wiley	F	Long Beach State	1	1981–1982	61	1,013	182	52	504	16.6	3.0	0.9	8.3	
Jamaal Wilkes^	G/F	UCLA	1	1985–1986	13	195	29	15	75	15.0	2.2	1.2	5.8	
Dominique Wilkins^	G/F	Georgia	1	1993–1994	25	948	176	55	727	37.9	7.0	2.2	29.1	
Dale Wilkinson	F	Idaho State	1	1984–1985	10	38	3	2	14	3.8	0.3	0.2	1.4	
Aaron Williams	F/C	Xavier	2	2006–2008	68	671	146	16	144	9.9	2.1	0.2	2.1	
Alvin Williams	G	Villanova	1	2006–2007	2	10	1	3	2	5.0	0.5	1.5	1.0	
Brian Williams	F/C	Arizona	1	1995–1996	65	2,157	492	122	1,029	33.2	7.6	1.9	15.8	
C. J. Williams	G	NC State	1	2017–2018	38	707	56	43	209	18.6	1.5	1.1	5.5	
Chuck Williams	G	Colorado	2	1976–1978	117	2,558	204	405	654	21.9	1.7	3.5	5.6	
Freeman Williams	G/F	Portland State	4	1978–1982	273	6,097	469	480	4,467	22.3	1.7	1.8	16.4	
John Williams	F/C	LSU	2	1992–1994	108	2,363	443	239	683	21.9	4.1	2.2	6.3	
Kevin Williams	G	St. John's	1	1988–1989	9	114	20	17	34	12.7	2.2	1.9	3.8	
Lou Williams	G	South Gwinnett HS (GA)	4	2017–2021	261	7,364	709	1,328	4,975	28.2	2.7	5.1	19.1	
Marcus Williams	F	Arizona	1	2007–2008	10	34	12	3	10	3.4	1.2	0.3	1.0	
Mo Williams	G	Alabama	2	2010–2012	74	2,195	155	283	1,020	29.7	2.1	3.8	13.8	
Reggie Williams	G/F	Georgetown	3	1987–1990	103	2,293	312	171	1,067	22.3	3.0	1.7	10.4	
Bill Willoughby	F/C	Dwight Morrow HS (NJ)	1	1977–1978	56	1,079	219	38	376	19.3	3.9	0.7	6.7	
George Wilson	C	Cincinnati	1	1970–1971	46	713	230	48	240	15.5	5.0	1.0	5.2	
Jamil Wilson	F	Marquette	1	2017–2018	15	274	32	10	105	18.3	2.1	0.7	7.0	
Lee Winfield	G	North Texas	2	1973–1975	104	1,692	169	181	484	16.3	1.6	1.7	4.7	
Dave Wohl	G	Penn	2	1972–1974	97	2,146	118	385	655	22.1	1.2	4.0	6.8	
Justise Winslow	G/F	Duke	1	2021–2022	37	480	133	52	156	13.0	3.6	1.4	4.2	
Joe Wolf	F/C	North Carolina	3	1987–1990	185	3,912	690	273	1,076	21.1	3.7	1.5	5.8	
Al Wood	G/F	North Carolina	2	1981–1983	105	2,514	326	181	1,187	23.9	3.1	1.7	11.3	
Randy Woods	G	La Salle	3	1992–1995	143	1,021	87	245	337	7.1	0.6	1.7	2.4	
Mike Woodson	G/F	Indiana	2	1986–1988	154	4,660	352	469	2,700	30.3	2.3	3.0	17.5	
Lorenzen Wright	F/C	Memphis	3	1996–1999	194	5,138	1,438	137	1,503	26.5	7.4	0.7	7.7	
Moses Wright	F	Georgia Tech	1	2021–2022	1	1	0	1	0	1.0	0.0	1.0	0.0	
Danny Young	G	Wake Forest	1	1991–1992	44	889	66	152	235	20.2	1.5	3.5	5.3	
Michael Young	G/F	Houston	1	1989–1990	45	459	86	24	219	10.2	1.9	0.5	4.9	
Nick Young	G/F	USC	1	2011–2012	22	518	36	10	214	23.5	1.6	0.5	9.7	
Ivica Zubac	C	(Serbia) Mega Basket	8	2018–2026	513	13,227	4,771	810	5,846	25.8	9.3	1.6	11.4	
