= 1981–82 San Diego Clippers season =

NBA professional basketball team season

- Head coach: Paul Silas
- Arena: San Diego Sports Arena

Results
- Record: 17–65 (.207)
- Place: Division: 6th (Pacific); Conference: 12th (Western)
- Playoff finish: Did not qualify
- Stats at Basketball Reference

Local media
- Television: XETV
- Radio: KGB

The 1981–82 San Diego Clippers season was the Clippers' 12th season in the NBA and their fourth season in the city of San Diego.

Donald Sterling took over control of the franchise during this season, beginning what would be a 33-year stewardship.

== Draft picks ==
Round	Pick	Player	Position	Nationality	School/Club team
1	8	Tom Chambers	Forward	United States	Utah
3	54	Jim Smith	Forward	United States	Ohio State
4	77	Lee Raker	Guard	United States	Virginia
5	100	Dennis Isbell	Forward	United States	Memphis State
6	123	Mike Pepper	Guard	United States	North Carolina
7	146	Randy Johnson	Guard	United States	Southern Colorado
8	168	Todd Haynes	Forward	United States	Davidson
9	190	Art Jones	Forward	United States	North Carolina State
10	210	Tony Gwynn	Guard	United States	San Diego State

== Roster ==
1981–82 San Diego Clippers roster
Players

Pos.	No.	Player	Height	Weight	DOB	From
G	15	Jim Brogan	6 ft 6 in (1.98 m)	180 lb (82 kg)		West Virginia Wesleyan
F	7	Michael Brooks	6 ft 7 in (2.01 m)	220 lb (100 kg)		La Salle
F	23	Joe Bryant	6 ft 9 in (2.06 m)	185 lb (84 kg)		La Salle
F	22	Tom Chambers	6 ft 10 in (2.08 m)	225 lb (102 kg)		Utah
G	1	Charlie Criss	5 ft 8 in (1.73 m)	165 lb (75 kg)		New Mexico State
G	42	Ron Davis	6 ft 6 in (1.98 m)	198 lb (90 kg)		Washington State
G	13	John Douglas	6 ft 2 in (1.88 m)	180 lb (82 kg)		Kansas
G	24	Armond Hill	6 ft 4 in (1.93 m)	190 lb (86 kg)		Princeton
F	34	Rock Lee	6 ft 10 in (2.08 m)	220 lb (100 kg)		San Diego State
C	31	Swen Nater	6 ft 11 in (2.11 m)	240 lb (109 kg)		UCLA
F	30	Jim Smith	6 ft 9 in (2.06 m)	225 lb (102 kg)		Ohio State
G	11	Phil Smith	6 ft 4 in (1.93 m)	197 lb (89 kg)		San Francisco
G	14	Brian Taylor	6 ft 2 in (1.88 m)	185 lb (84 kg)		Princeton
C	33	Jerome Whitehead	6 ft 10 in (2.08 m)	220 lb (100 kg)		Marquette
F	21	Michael Wiley	6 ft 9 in (2.06 m)	235 lb (107 kg)		Long Beach State
C	32	Bill Walton (injured)	6 ft 11 in (2.11 m)	235 lb (107 kg)		UCLA
G	20	Freeman Williams	6 ft 4 in (1.93 m)	185 lb (84 kg)		Portland State
G	4	Al Wood	6 ft 6 in (1.98 m)	193 lb (88 kg)		North Carolina

Coaches
Head coach
- Paul Silas

Legend
- (DP) Unsigned draft pick
- (FA) Free agent
- (S) Suspended
- Injured

=== Roster notes ===
- Center Bill Walton missed the entire season again due to another left foot injury.
- This is Jerome Whitehead's second tour of duty with the Clippers. He previously played with the team during the 1978–79 season.
- Guard Armond Hill later became an assistant coach with the franchise from 2013 to 2020.

== Regular season ==
=== Season standings ===
Pacific Division	W	L	PCT	GB	Home	Road	Div
y-Los Angeles Lakers	57	25	.695	–	30–11	27–14	21–9
x-Seattle SuperSonics	52	30	.634	5.0	31–10	21–20	18–12
x-Phoenix Suns	46	36	.561	11.0	31–10	15–26	14–16
Golden State Warriors	45	37	.549	12.0	28–13	17–24	15–15
Portland Trail Blazers	42	40	.512	15.0	27–14	15–26	15–15
San Diego Clippers	17	65	.207	40.0	11–30	6–35	7–23

#	Western Conference				
#	Team	W	L	PCT	GB
1	c-Los Angeles Lakers	57	25	.695	–
2	y-San Antonio Spurs	48	34	.585	9
3	x-Seattle SuperSonics	52	30	.634	5
4	x-Denver Nuggets	46	36	.561	11
5	x-Phoenix Suns	46	36	.561	11
6	x-Houston Rockets	46	36	.561	11
7	Golden State Warriors	45	37	.549	12
8	Portland Trail Blazers	42	40	.512	15
9	Kansas City Kings	30	52	.366	27
10	Dallas Mavericks	28	54	.341	29
11	Utah Jazz	25	57	.305	32
12	San Diego Clippers	17	65	.207	40

Notes

- z, y – division champions
- x – clinched playoff spot

== Player statistics ==
Legend
GP	Games played	GS	Games started	MPG	Minutes per game
FG%	Field-goal percentage	3P%	3-point field-goal percentage	FT%	Free-throw percentage
RPG	Rebounds per game	APG	Assists per game	SPG	Steals per game
BPG	Blocks per game	PPG	Points per game

Player	GP	GS	MPG	FG%	3FG%	FT%	RPG	APG	SPG	BPG	PPG
Jim Brogan	63	19	16.3	.453	.281	.726	1.9	2.5	0.8	0.2	6.3
Michael Brooks	82	73	33.5	.504	.000	.757	7.6	2.9	1.4	0.5	15.6
Joe Bryant	75	49	26.5	.486	.267	.785	3.7	2.5	1.0	0.4	11.8
Tom Chambers	81	58	33.1	.525	.000	.620	6.9	1.8	0.7	0.6	17.2
Charlie Criss	28	20	30.0	.479	.381	.884	1.6	4.0	0.8	0.1	12.9
Ron Davis	7	0	9.6	.400		.500	1.9	0.6	0.0	0.0	3.3
John Douglas	64	9	16.1	.465	.305	.657	1.4	2.3	0.8	0.1	7.0
Armond Hill	19	14	25.3	.382	.000	.688	1.4	4.3	0.8	0.2	4.7
Rock Lee	2	0	5.0	.500		.000	0.5	1.0	0.0	0.0	1.0
Swen Nater	21	7	27.4	.577	1.000	.747	9.1	1.4	0.3	0.4	12.5
Jim Smith	72	3	11.9	.509		.459	2.5	0.6	0.3	0.7	2.9
Phil Smith	48	39	30.1	.440	.208	.732	2.4	4.9	0.9	0.4	13.2
Brian Taylor	41	40	31.1	.503	.365	.818	2.3	5.6	1.1	0.2	10.8
Jerome Whitehead	72	63	30.8	.559		.763	9.2	1.4	0.7	0.6	13.8
Michael Wiley	61	1	16.6	.565	.000	.695	3.0	0.9	0.7	0.3	8.3
Freeman Williams	37	10	21.8	.456	.324	.843	1.4	1.8	0.6	0.0	16.5
Al Wood	29	5	23.9	.518	.167	.802	3.1	1.6	0.8	0.3	12.5

== Transactions ==
The Clippers were involved in the following transactions during the 1981–82 season.

=== Trades ===
January 20, 1982
February 16, 1982
To San Diego Clippers

- Al Wood & Charlie Criss
To San Diego Clippers

- Armond Hill, 1982 second-round draft pick & cash
To Atlanta Hawks

- Freeman Williams
To Seattle SuperSonics

- Phil Smith

=== Free agents ===
==== Additions ====
Player	Signed	Former team
Jim Brogan	8/31/81	Atlantic City Hi-Rollers
John Douglas	9/4/81	Montana Golden Nuggets
Michael Wiley	12/2/81	San Antonio Spurs
Rock Lee	4/11/82	San Diego Clippers

==== Subtractions ====
Player	Left	New team
Wally Rank	7/28/81	Sacramora Rimini
Rock Lee	10/20/81	
Ron Davis	11/30/81	Anchorage Northern Knights
