= 1980 NBA draft =

Basketball player selection

General information
- Sport: Basketball
- Date: June 10, 1980
- Location: Sheraton Centre Hotel & Towers (New York City, New York)
- Network: USA Network

Overview
- 214 total selections in 10 rounds
- League: NBA
- First selection: Joe Barry Carroll (Golden State Warriors)
- Hall of Famers: 1: F Kevin McHale

The 1980 NBA draft was the 34th annual draft of the National Basketball Association (NBA). The draft was held on June 10, 1980, at the Sheraton Centre Hotel & Towers, before the 1980–81 season. In this draft, 23 NBA teams took turns selecting amateur U.S. college basketball players and other eligible players, including international players. The first two picks in the draft belonged to the teams that finished last in each conference, with the order determined by a coin flip.

The Boston Celtics, who obtained the Detroit Pistons' first-round pick in a trade, won the coin flip and were awarded the first overall pick, while the Utah Jazz were awarded the second pick. The Celtics then traded the first pick to the Golden State Warriors before the draft. The remaining first-round picks and the subsequent rounds were assigned to teams in reverse order of their win–loss record in the previous season. An expansion franchise, the Dallas Mavericks, took part in the NBA Draft for the first time and were assigned the eleventh pick in each round. A player who had finished his four-year college eligibility was automatically eligible for selection. Before the draft, five college underclassmen announced that they would leave college early and would be eligible for selection. The draft consisted of 10 rounds comprising the selection of 214 players. This draft was also notable for being the first NBA draft to air on national TV, with the event being aired on the USA Network; it would continue airing on the USA Network for a few more years after this one up until the 1985 NBA draft occurred, which had the event start airing on TBS instead.

== Draft selections and draftee career notes ==
Joe Barry Carroll from Purdue University was selected first overall by the Golden State Warriors. Darrell Griffith from the University of Louisville was selected second by the Utah Jazz. He went on to win the Rookie of the Year Award in his first season. Kevin McHale from the University of Minnesota was selected third by the Boston Celtics. McHale spent his entire 13-year career with the Celtics and won three NBA championships. He also won two consecutive Sixth Man of the Year Award and was also selected to one All-NBA Team, seven All Star Games and six All-Defensive Teams. For his achievements, he has been inducted to the Basketball Hall of Fame. McHale was also named to the list of the 50 Greatest Players in NBA History announced at the league's 50th anniversary in 1996. Carroll, 8th pick Andrew Toney, 11th pick Kiki Vandeweghe and 25th pick Jeff Ruland are the only other players from this draft who was selected to an All-Star Game.

Nine players drafted went on to have a coaching career in the NBA. Kevin McHale served as the interim head coach for the Timberwolves in 2005 and in the 2008–2009 season before working as head coach of the Houston Rockets for four and a half seasons. Mike Woodson, the 12th pick, coached the Atlanta Hawks for six seasons. Larry Drew, the 17th pick, worked as Woodson's assistant before he was promoted to the head coaching position in 2010. Bill Hanzlik, the 20th pick, coached the Denver Nuggets in the 1997–1998 season, compiling an 11–71 record, the worst full-season record for a rookie coach in NBA history. Butch Carter, the 37th pick, coached the Toronto Raptors for two and a half seasons. Terry Stotts, the 38th pick, coached both the Atlanta Hawks and Milwaukee Bucks for two seasons, and the Portland Trail Blazers for nine seasons. Kurt Rambis, the 58th pick, who played nine years for the Los Angeles Lakers, served as the team's interim head coach in 1999. After working as the Lakers assistant coach for seven years, Rambis received his first permanent head coaching position with the Minnesota Timberwolves in 2009. Two other players, Kiki Vandeweghe and Kenny Natt, had brief spells as interim head coaches in the NBA, each of which lasted less than one season. Woodson would later go on to be the first person in NBA history to become head coach of the team that drafted him when he took over as head coach of the New York Knicks on an interim basis in March 2012.

== Key ==
Pos.	G	F	C
Position	Guard	Forward	Center

^	Denotes player who has been inducted to the Naismith Memorial Basketball Hall of Fame
*	Denotes player who has been selected for at least one All-Star Game and All-NBA Team
^{+}	Denotes player who has been selected for at least one All-Star Game
^{x}	Denotes player who has been selected for at least one All-NBA Team
^{#}	Denotes player who has never appeared in an NBA regular-season or playoff game
^{~}	Denotes player who has been selected as Rookie of the Year

== Draft ==
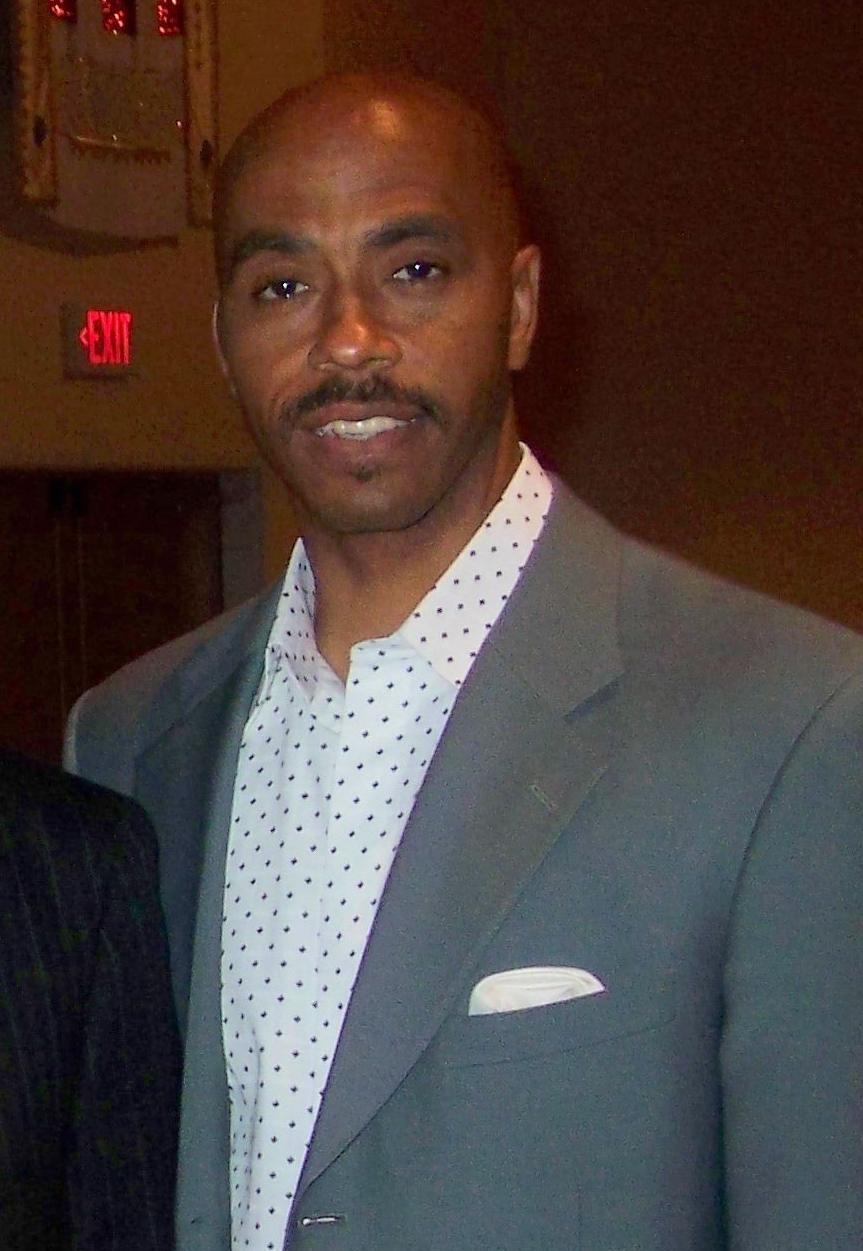
Darrell Griffith was selected second overall by the Utah Jazz.

Kevin McHale (green shirt) was selected third overall by the Boston Celtics.

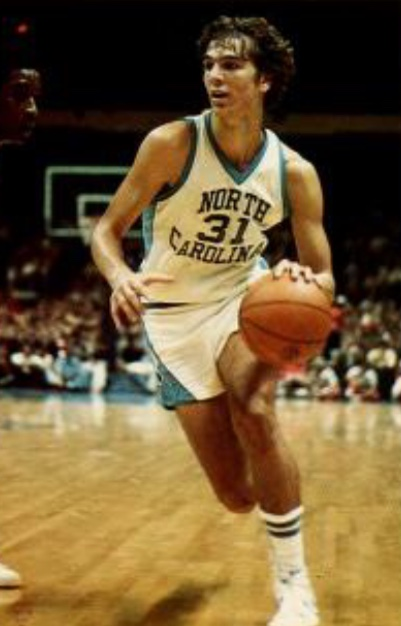
Mike O'Koren was selected sixth overall by the New Jersey Nets.

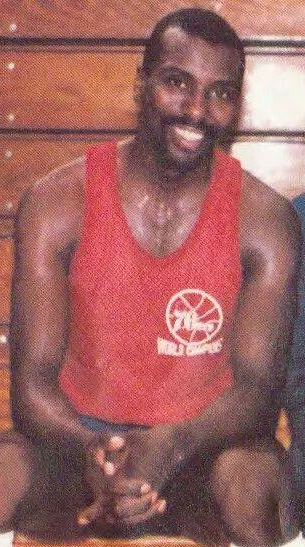
Andrew Toney was selected eighth overall by the Philadelphia 76ers.

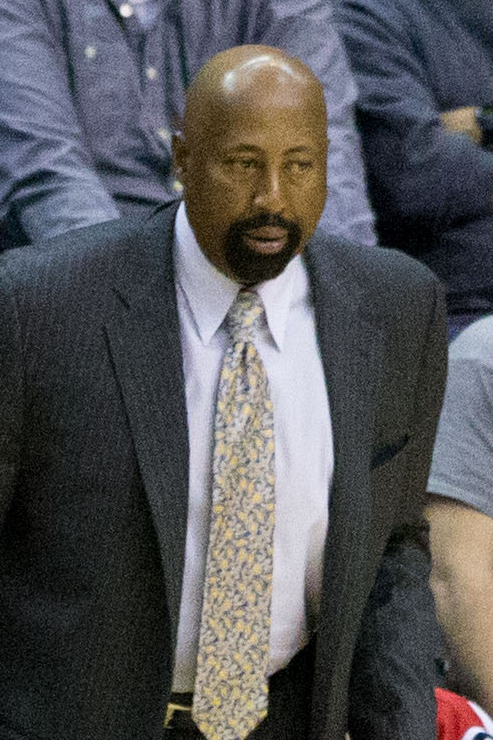
Mike Woodson was selected 12th overall by the New York Knicks.

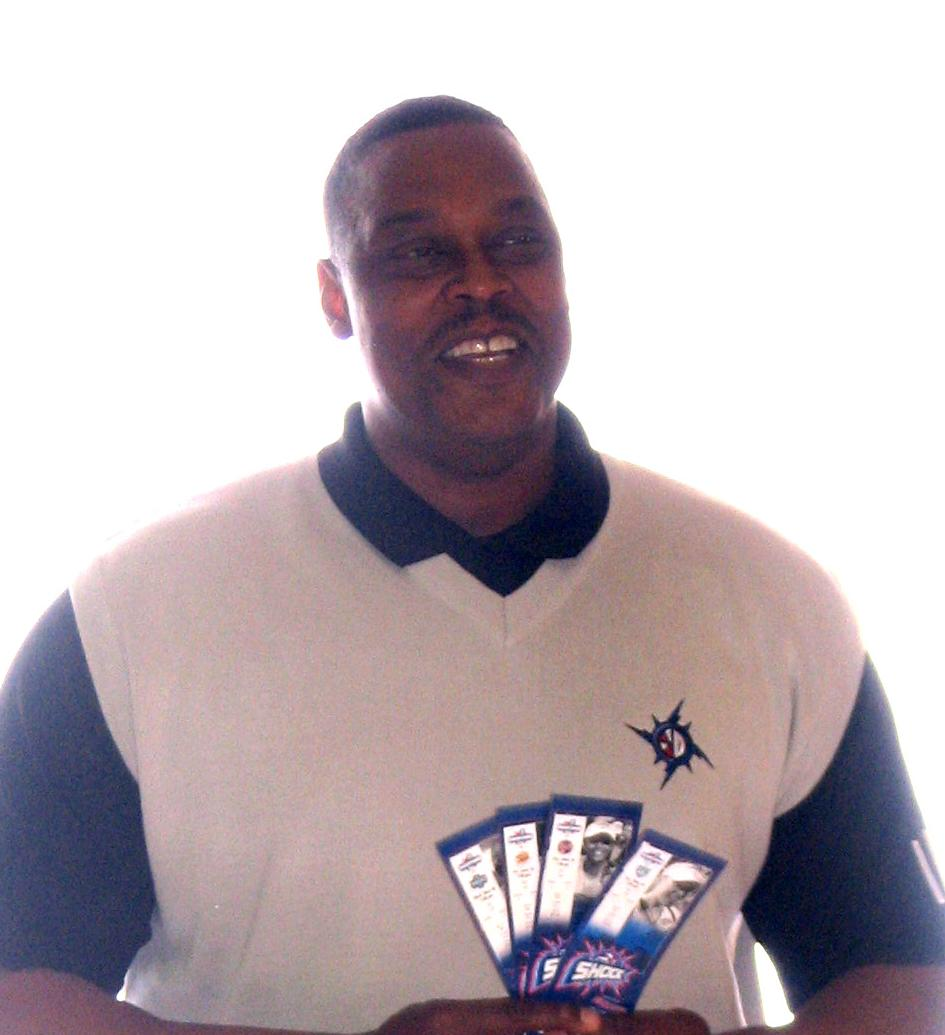
Rick Mahorn was selected 35th overall by the Washington Bullets.

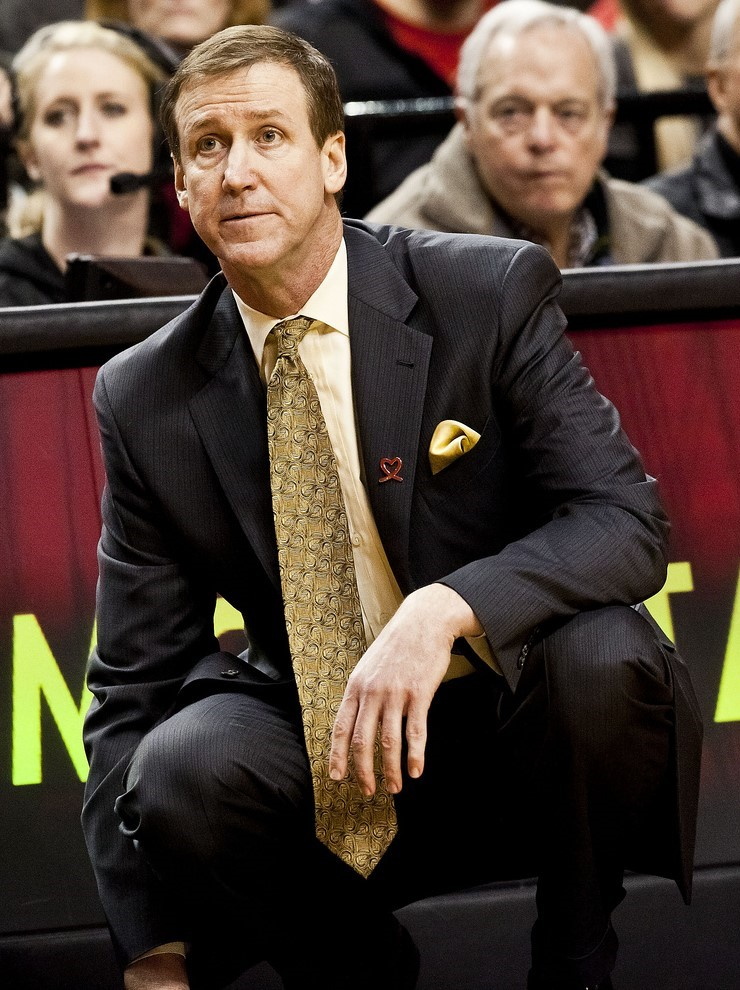
Terry Stotts was selected 38th overall by the Houston Rockets.

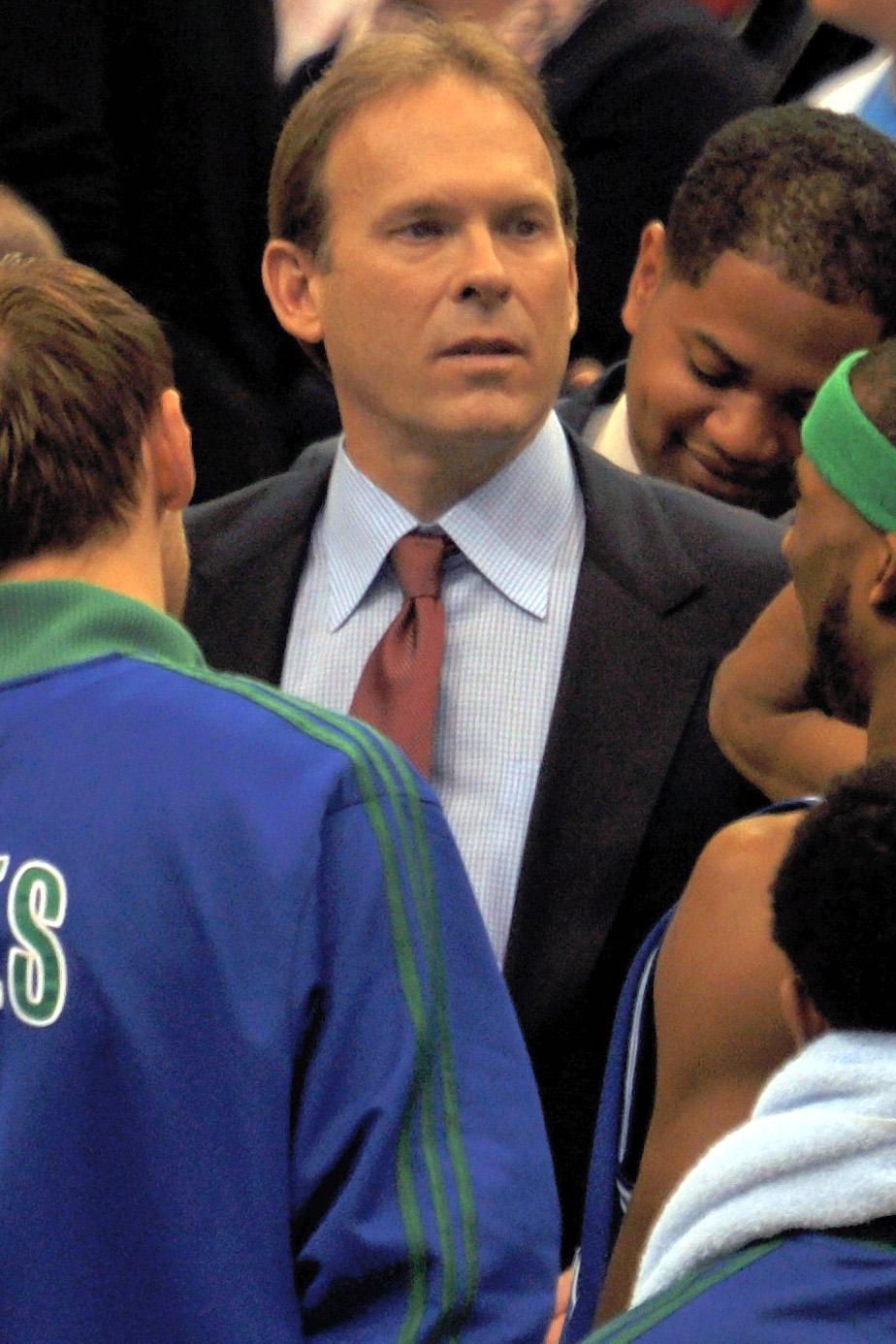
Kurt Rambis was selected 58th overall by the New York Knicks.

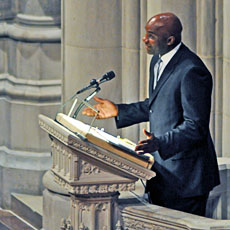
Rory Sparrow was selected 75th overall by the New Jersey Nets.

Rnd.	Pick	Player	Pos.	Nationality (Note: Nationality indicates the player's national team or representative nationality. If a player has not competed at the international level, then the nationality indicates the national team which the player is eligible to represent according to FIBA rules.)	Team	School / club team
1	1	Joe Barry Carroll^{+}	F/C	United States	Golden State Warriors (from Detroit via Boston)^{[a]}	Purdue (Sr.)
1	2	Darrell Griffith~	G	United States	Utah Jazz	Louisville (Sr.)
1	3	Kevin McHale^	F/C	United States	Boston Celtics (from Golden State)^{[a]}	Minnesota (Sr.)
1	4	Kelvin Ransey	G	United States	Chicago Bulls (traded to Portland)^{[A]}	Ohio State (Sr.)
1	5	James Ray	F	United States	Denver Nuggets	Jacksonville (Sr.)
1	6	Mike O'Koren	G/F	United States	New Jersey Nets	North Carolina (Sr.)
1	7	Mike Gminski	C	United States	New Jersey Nets (from San Diego via Portland)^{[b]}	Duke (Sr.)
1	8	Andrew Toney^{+}	G	United States	Philadelphia 76ers (from Indiana)^{[c]}	Southwestern Louisiana (Sr.)
1	9	Michael Brooks	F	United States	San Diego Clippers (from Cleveland)^{[d]}	La Salle (Sr.)
1	10	Ronnie Lester	G	United States	Portland Trail Blazers (traded to Chicago)^{[A]}	Iowa (Sr.)
1	11	Kiki Vandeweghe^{+}	F	United States	Dallas Mavericks	UCLA (Sr.)
1	12	Mike Woodson	G/F	United States	New York Knicks	Indiana (Sr.)
1	13	Rickey Brown	F/C	United States	Golden State Warriors (from Washington via Detroit and Boston)^{[a]}	Mississippi State (Sr.)
1	14	Wes Matthews	G	United States	Washington Bullets (from Houston)^{[e]}	Wisconsin (Jr.)
1	15	Reggie Johnson	F/C	United States	San Antonio Spurs	Tennessee (Sr.)
1	16	Charles Whitney	G/F	United States	Kansas City Kings	NC State (Sr.)
1	17	Larry Drew	G	United States	Detroit Pistons (from Milwaukee)^{[f]}	Missouri (Sr.)
1	18	Don Collins	G/F	United States	Atlanta Hawks	Washington State (Sr.)
1	19	John Duren	G	United States	Utah Jazz (from Phoenix)^{[g]}	Georgetown (Sr.)
1	20	Bill Hanzlik	G/F	United States	Seattle SuperSonics	Notre Dame (Sr.)
1	21	Monti Davis	F	United States	Philadelphia 76ers	Tennessee State (Sr.)
1	22	Chad Kinch	G	United States	Cleveland Cavaliers (from Los Angeles)^{[h]}	UNC Charlotte (Sr.)
1	23	Carl Nicks	G	United States	Denver Nuggets (from Boston via Indiana)^{[i]}	Indiana State (Sr.)
2	24	Larry Smith	F/C	United States	Golden State Warriors (from Detroit)^{[j]}	Alcorn State (Sr.)
2	25	Jeff Ruland^{+}	F/C	United States	Golden State Warriors (traded to Washington)^{[B]}	Iona (Jr.)
2	26	Sam Worthen	F	United States	Chicago Bulls (from Utah via Los Angeles)^{[k]}	Marquette (Sr.)
2	27	John Stroud	F	United States	Houston Rockets (from Denver via New Jersey)	Mississippi (Sr.)
2	28	Craig Shelton	F	United States	Atlanta Hawks (from Chicago)	Georgetown (Sr.)
2	29	Louis Orr	F	United States	Indiana Pacers (from New Jersey)	Syracuse (Sr.)
2	30	Kenny Natt	G	United States	Indiana Pacers (from San Diego)	Northeast Louisiana (Sr.)
2	31	Wayne Robinson	F	United States	Los Angeles Lakers (from Cleveland)	Virginia Tech (Sr.)
2	32	David Lawrence^{#}	F	United States	Portland Trail Blazers (from Indiana)	McNeese State (Sr.)
2	33	Bruce Collins^{#}	G/F	United States	Portland Trail Blazers	Weber State (Sr.)
2	34	Roosevelt Bouie^{#}	C	United States	Dallas Mavericks	Syracuse (Sr.)
2	35	Rick Mahorn	F/C	United States	Washington Bullets	Hampton (Sr.)
2	36	DeWayne Scales	F	United States	New York Knicks	LSU (Jr.)
2	37	Butch Carter	G	United States	Los Angeles Lakers (from San Antonio)	Indiana (Sr.)
2	38	Terry Stotts^{#}	F	United States	Houston Rockets	Oklahoma (Sr.)
2	39	Michael Wiley	F	United States	San Antonio Spurs (from Kansas City)	Long Beach State (Sr.)
2	40	Dick Miller	F	United States	Indiana Pacers (from Milwaukee via Kansas City)	Toledo (Sr.)
2	41	Jawann Oldham	C	United States	Denver Nuggets (from Atlanta via Utah)	Seattle (Sr.)
2	42	Kimberly Belton^{#}	F	United States	Phoenix Suns	Stanford (Sr.)
2	43	Billy Williams^{#}	G	United States	Houston Rockets (from Seattle)	Clemson (Sr.)
2	44	Clyde Austin^{#}	G	United States	Philadelphia 76ers	NC State (Sr.)
2	45	Brad Branson	F/C	United States	Detroit Pistons (from Los Angeles)	SMU (Sr.)
2	46	Arnette Hallman^{#}	F	United States	Boston Celtics	Purdue (Sr.)
3	47	Kurt Nimphius	F/C	United States	Denver Nuggets (from Detroit)	Arizona State (Sr.)
3	48	Eddie Lee^{#}	G	United States	Denver Nuggets	Cincinnati (Sr.)
3	49	John Virgil^{#}	G	United States	Golden State Warriors	North Carolina (Sr.)
3	50	James Wilkes	F	United States	Chicago Bulls	UCLA (Sr.)
3	51	Ronnie Valentine	F	United States	Denver Nuggets	Old Dominion (Sr.)
3	52	Lowes Moore	G	United States	New Jersey Nets	West Virginia (Sr.)
3	53	Stuart House^{#}	C	United States	Cleveland Cavaliers	Washington State (Sr.)
3	54	Ron Perry^{#}	G	United States	Boston Celtics	Holy Cross (Sr.)
3	55	Wayne Abrams^{#}	F	United States	Cleveland Cavaliers	Southern Illinois (Sr.)
3	56	Mike Harper	F/C	United States	Portland Trail Blazers	North Park (Sr.)
3	57	David Britton	G	United States	Dallas Mavericks	Texas A&M (Sr.)
3	58	Kurt Rambis	F	United States	New York Knicks	Santa Clara (Sr.)
3	59	John Campbell^{#}	F	United States	Phoenix Suns	Clemson (Sr.)
3	60	LaVon Mercer^{#}	F	United States (Note: Mercer became an Israeli citizen and played for the Israel national team.)	San Antonio Spurs	Georgia (Sr.)
4	61	Rich Yonakor	F	United States	San Antonio Spurs	North Carolina (Sr.)
3	62	Tony Murphy^{#}	G	United States	Kansas City Kings	Southern (Sr.)
3	63	Al Beal^{#}	F	United States	Milwaukee Bucks	Oklahoma (Sr.)
3	64	Jonathan Moore^{#}	F	United States	Detroit Pistons	Furman (Sr.)
3	65	Doug True^{#}	F	United States	Phoenix Suns	California (Sr.)
4	66	Carl Bailey	C	United States	Seattle SuperSonics	Tuskegee (Sr.)
3	67	Reggie Gaines^{#}	F	United States	Philadelphia 76ers	Winston-Salem State (Sr.)
3	68	Ron Jones^{#}	G	United States	Cleveland Cavaliers	Illinois State (Sr.)
3	69	Don Newman^{#}	G	United States	Boston Celtics	Idaho (Sr.)
4	70	Darwin Cook	G	United States	Detroit Pistons	Portland (Sr.)
4	71	Robert Scott^{#}	G	United States	Golden State Warriors	Alabama (Sr.)
4	72	Alan Taylor^{#}	C	United States	Utah Jazz	BYU (Sr.)
4	73	Sammie Ellis^{#}	F	United States	Denver Nuggets	Pittsburgh (Sr.)
4	74	Ron Charles^{#}	F	United States	Chicago Bulls	Michigan State (Sr.)
4	75	Rory Sparrow	G	United States	New Jersey Nets	Villanova (Sr.)
4	76	Ed Odom^{#}	G	United States	San Diego Clippers	Oklahoma State (Sr.)
4	77	Murray Brown^{#}	F	United States	Cleveland Cavaliers	Florida State (Sr.)
4	78	Rich Branning^{#}	G	United States	Indiana Pacers	Notre Dame (Sr.)
4	79	Kelvin Henderson^{#}	F	United States	Portland Trail Blazers	Saint Louis (Sr.)
4	80	David Johnson^{#}	F	United States	Dallas Mavericks	Weber State (Sr.)
4	81	Francois Wise^{#}	F	United States	Washington Bullets	Long Beach State (Sr.)
4	82	Joe Chrnelich^{#}	F	United States	New York Knicks	Wisconsin (Sr.)
4	83	Calvin Roberts^{#}	F	United States	San Antonio Spurs	Cal State Fullerton (Sr.)
4	84	Dean Hunger^{#}	F	United States	Houston Rockets	Utah State (Sr.)
4	85	Billy Bryant^{#}	G	United States	Philadelphia 76ers	Western Kentucky (Sr.)
4	86	Jeff Wolf^{#}	F	United States	Milwaukee Bucks	North Carolina (Sr.)
4	87	Tony Jackson	G	United States	Los Angeles Lakers (from Atlanta)	Florida State (Sr.)
4	88	Leroy Stampley^{#}	G	United States	Phoenix Suns	Loyola Chicago (Sr.)
4	89	Gary Hooker^{#}	F	United States	Seattle SuperSonics	Murray State (Sr.)
4	90	Harold Hubbard^{#}	F	United States	Philadelphia 76ers	Savannah State (Sr.)
4	91	Ron Baxter^{#}	G	United States	Los Angeles Lakers	Texas (Sr.)
4	92	Kevin Hamilton^{#}	G	United States	Boston Celtics	Iona (Sr.)
5	93	Tony Fuller	G	United States	Detroit Pistons	Pepperdine (Sr.)
5	94	Wally West^{#}	F	United States	Utah Jazz	Boston University (Sr.)
5	95	Don Carfino^{#}	G	United States	Golden State Warriors	USC (Sr.)
5	96	Mike Campbell^{#}	F	United States	Chicago Bulls	Northwestern (Sr.)
5	97	James Patrick^{#}	F	United States	Denver Nuggets	Texas State (Sr.)
5	98	Aaron Curry^{#}	G	United States	New Jersey Nets	Oklahoma (Sr.)
5	99	Wally Rank	G/F	United States	San Diego Clippers	San Jose State (Sr.)
5	100	Joe Galvin^{#}	C	United States	Indiana Pacers	Illinois State (Sr.)
5	101	LaVon Williams^{#}	G	United States	Cleveland Cavaliers	Kentucky (Sr.)
5	102	Larry Belin^{#}	F	United States	Portland Trail Blazers	New Mexico (Sr.)
5	103	Darrell Allums	F	United States	Dallas Mavericks	UCLA (Sr.)
5	104	William Carey^{#}	G	United States	New York Knicks	Albright (Sr.)
5	105	Daryl Strickland^{#}	F	United States	Washington Bullets	Rutgers (Sr.)
5	106	Albert Jones^{#}	F	United States	Houston Rockets	New Mexico (Sr.)
5	107	Gib Hinz^{#}	C	United States	San Antonio Spurs	Wisconsin–Eau Claire (Sr.)
5	108	Kelvin Blakely^{#}	F	United States	Kansas City Kings	Eastern Michigan (Sr.)
5	109	Ken Jones^{#}	C	United States	Milwaukee Bucks	VCU (Sr.)
5	110	Mike Doyle^{#}	G	United States	Atlanta Hawks	South Carolina (Sr.)
5	111	Mark Stevens^{#}	F	United States	Phoenix Suns	Northern Arizona (Sr.)
5	112	Lenny Horton^{#}	F	United States	Seattle SuperSonics	Georgia Tech (Sr.)
5	113	Jim Swaney^{#}	F	United States	Philadelphia 76ers	Toledo (Sr.)
5	114	Rick Raivio^{#}	G	United States	Los Angeles Lakers	Portland (Sr.)
5	115	Rufus Harris^{#}	G	United States	Boston Celtics	Maine (Sr.)
6	116	Tony Turner^{#}	G	United States	Detroit Pistons	Alaska Anchorage (Sr.)
6	117	Neil Bresnahan^{#}	F	United States	Golden State Warriors	Illinois (Sr.)
6	118	Kenny Cunningham^{#}	G	United States	Utah Jazz	Western Michigan (Sr.)
6	119	Ernie Hill^{#}	G	United States	Denver Nuggets	Oklahoma City (Sr.)
6	120	Bernard Rencher^{#}	G	United States	Chicago Bulls	St. John's (Sr.)
6	121	Rick Mattick^{#}	C	United States	New Jersey Nets	LSU (Sr.)
6	122	Londale Theus^{#}	G	United States	San Diego Clippers	Santa Clara (Sr.)
6	123	Antonio Martin^{#}	F	United States	Cleveland Cavaliers	Oral Roberts (Sr.)
6	124	Randy Owens^{#}	F	United States	Indiana Pacers	Philadelphia Textile (So.)
6	125	Perry Mirkovich^{#}	G	Canada	Portland Trail Blazers	Lethbridge (Sr.)
6	126	Leroy Jackson^{#}	G	United States	Dallas Mavericks	Cameron (Sr.)
6	127	Ken Dancy^{#}	F	United States	Washington Bullets	Chicago State (Sr.)
6	128	Kelvin Hicks^{#}	F	United States	New York Knicks	NYIT (Sr.)
6	129	Dean Uthoff^{#}	C	United States	San Antonio Spurs	Iowa State (Sr.)
6	130	Everette Jefferson^{#}	F	United States	Houston Rockets	New Mexico (Sr.)
6	131	Trent Grooms^{#}	F	United States	Kansas City Kings	Kent State (Sr.)
6	132	Alex Gilbert^{#}	F	United States	Milwaukee Bucks	Indiana State (Sr.)
6	133	Mike Zagardo^{#}	F	United States	Atlanta Hawks	George Washington (Sr.)
6	134	Coby Leavitt^{#}	F	United States	Phoenix Suns	Utah (Sr.)
6	135	Jim Strickland^{#}	C	United States	Seattle SuperSonics	South Carolina (Sr.)
6	136	Donald Cooper^{#}	F	United States	Philadelphia 76ers	St. Augustine's (Sr.)
6	137	Otis Boddie^{#}	G	United States	Los Angeles Lakers	North Alabama (Sr.)
6	138	Kenny Evans^{#}	G	United States	Boston Celtics	Norfolk State (Sr.)
7	139	Carl Pierce^{#}	F	United States	Detroit Pistons	Gonzaga (Sr.)
7	140	Dave Colescott^{#}	G	United States	Utah Jazz	North Carolina (Sr.)
7	141	Lorenzo Romar	G	United States	Golden State Warriors	Washington (Sr.)
7	142	Robert Byrd^{#}	F	United States	Chicago Bulls	Marquette (Sr.)
7	143	Tommy Springer^{#}	G	United States	Denver Nuggets	Vanderbilt (Sr.)
7	144	Larry Spicer^{#}	F	United States	Milwaukee Bucks	UAB (Sr.)
7	145	Paul Anderson^{#}	G	United States	San Diego Clippers	Vanguard (Sr.)
7	146	Charles Naddaff^{#}	F	United States	Indiana Pacers	Lafayette (Sr.)
7	147	Leroy Berry^{#}	G	United States	Cleveland Cavaliers	Wilmington (Ohio) (Sr.)
7	148	Gig Sims^{#}	C	United States	Portland Trail Blazers	UCLA (Sr.)
7	149	Tony Forch^{#}	F	United States	Dallas Mavericks	Midwestern State (Sr.)
7	150	Bobby Turner^{#}	G	United States	New York Knicks	Louisville (Jr.)
7	151	Karl Godine^{#}	G	United States	Washington Bullets	Stephen F. Austin (Sr.)
7	152	Joe Nehls^{#}	G	United States	Houston Rockets	Arizona (Sr.)
7	153	Alan Zahn^{#}	F	United States	San Antonio Spurs	Arkansas (Sr.)
7	154	Arnold McDowell^{#}	G	United States	Kansas City Kings	Montana State (Sr.)
7	155	Ron White^{#}	G	United States	Milwaukee Bucks	Furman (Sr.)
7	156	Charles Hightower^{#}	F	United States	Atlanta Hawks	Dillard (Sr.)
7	157	Ron Williams^{#}	G	United States	Phoenix Suns	Montana Western (Sr.)
7	158	Carl Ervin^{#}	G	United States	Seattle SuperSonics	Seattle (Sr.)
7	159	Richard Smith^{#}	C	United States	Philadelphia 76ers	Weber State (Sr.)
7	Los Angeles Lakers (forfeited due to selection of ineligible player) (Note: The Lakers selected Charles Davis of the Vanderbilt Commodores. Davis had been granted an extra year of collegiate eligibility by the National Collegiate Athletic Association (NCAA) and did not declare hardship status for the draft.)					
7	160	Les Henson^{#}	F	United States	Boston Celtics	Virginia Tech (Sr.)
8	161	Leroy Loggins^{#}	G	United States (Note: Loggins became an Australian citizen and played for the Australia national team.)	Detroit Pistons	Fairmont State (Sr.)
8	162	Kurt Kanaskie^{#}	G	United States	Golden State Warriors	La Salle (Sr.)
8	163	Jim Brandon^{#}	F	United States	Utah Jazz	Saint Peter's (Sr.)
8	Denver Nuggets (forfeited due to selection of ineligible player) (Note: The Nuggets selected Frank Johnson of the Wake Forest Demon Deacons. Johnson had been granted an extra year of collegiate eligibility by the National Collegiate Athletic Association (NCAA) and did not declare hardship status for the draft.)					
8	164	Modzel Greer^{#}	F	United States	Chicago Bulls	North Park (Sr.)
8	165	Lloyd Terry^{#}	F	United States	New Jersey Nets	New Orleans (Sr.)
8	166	Jim Ellinghausen^{#}	F	United States	Cleveland Cavaliers	Ohio State (Sr.)
8	167	Steve Stielper^{#}	F	United States	Indiana Pacers	James Madison (Sr.)
8	168	John Stroeder	F	United States	Portland Trail Blazers	Montana (Sr.)
8	169	Clarence Kea	F	United States	Dallas Mavericks	Lamar (Sr.)
8	170	Rich Valavicius^{#}	F	United States	Washington Bullets	Auburn (Sr.)
8	171	James Salters^{#}	G	United States	New York Knicks	Penn (Sr.)
8	172	Bill Bailey^{#}	G	United States	San Antonio Spurs	Pan American Broncs (Sr.)
8	173	Rosie Barnes^{#}	G	United States	Houston Rockets	Bowling Green (Sr.)
8	Kansas City Kings (forfeited due to selection of ineligible player) (Note: The Kings selected Kevin Singleton of the California Golden Bears. Singleton had been granted an extra year of collegiate eligibility by the National Collegiate Athletic Association (NCAA) and did not declare hardship status for the draft.)					
8	174	Keith Valentine^{#}	G	United States	Milwaukee Bucks	Virginia Union (Sr.)
8	Atlanta Hawks (forfeited due to selection of ineligible player) (Note: The Hawks selected Larry Lawrence of the Dartmouth Big Green. Lawrence had been granted an extra year of collegiate eligibility by the National Collegiate Athletic Association (NCAA) and did not declare hardship status for the draft.)					
8	175	Jim Connolly^{#}	F	United States	Phoenix Suns	La Salle (Sr.)
8	176	Al Dutch^{#}	F	United States	Seattle SuperSonics	Georgetown (Sr.)
8	177	Martin Lemelle^{#}	G	United States	Philadelphia 76ers	Grambling State (Sr.)
8	178	Melvin Hooker^{#}	F	United States	Los Angeles Lakers	Edinboro (Sr.)
8	179	Steve Wright^{#}	F	United States	Boston Celtics	Boston University (Sr.)
9	180	Terry DuPris^{#}	G	United States	Detroit Pistons	Huron (Sr.)
9	181	Paul Renfro^{#}	C	United States	Utah Jazz	UT Arlington (Sr.)
9	182	Billy Reid	G	United States	Golden State Warriors	San Francisco (Sr.)
9	183	Jay Shidler^{#}	G	United States	Chicago Bulls	Kentucky (Sr.)
9	184	Jim Graziano^{#}	C	United States	Denver Nuggets	South Carolina (Sr.)
9	185	Barry Young^{#}	F	United States	New Jersey Nets	Colorado State (Sr.)
9	186	Scott Rogers^{#}	G	United States	Indiana Pacers	Kenyon (Sr.)
9	187	Melvin Crafter^{#}	F	United States	Cleveland Cavaliers	Central State (Sr.)
9	188	Rick Boucher^{#}	G	United States	Portland Trail Blazers	Maine (Sr.)
9	189	Ken Williams^{#}	G	United States	Dallas Mavericks	Houston (Sr.)
9	190	Don Wiley^{#}	F	United States	New York Knicks	Monmouth (Sr.)
9	191	Clinton Wyatt^{#}	G	United States	Washington Bullets	Alcorn State (Sr.)
9	192	Al Williams^{#}	F	United States	San Antonio Spurs	North Texas (Sr.)
9	193	Charley Cole^{#}	G	United States	Kansas City Kings	Delta State (Sr.)
9	194	Del Yarbrough^{#}	F	United States	Milwaukee Bucks	Illinois State (Sr.)
9	195	Stanley Lamb^{#}	G	United States	Atlanta Hawks	Steubenville (Sr.)
9	196	Keith French^{#}	F	United States	Phoenix Suns	North Park (Sr.)
9	197	Jim Tillman ^{#}	G	United States	Seattle SuperSonics	Eastern Kentucky (Sr.)
9	198	Luke Griffin^{#}	G	United States	Philadelphia 76ers	Saint Joseph's (Sr.)
9	199	Brian Jung^{#}	C	United States	Boston Celtics	Northwestern (Sr.)
10	Detroit Pistons (forfeited due to selection of ineligible player) (Note: The Pistons selected Steve Johnson of the Oregon State Beavers. Johnson had been granted an extra year of collegiate eligibility by the National Collegiate Athletic Association (NCAA) and did not declare hardship status for the draft.)					
10	200	Tim Higgins^{#}	G	United States	Golden State Warriors	Nebraska–Kearney (Sr.)
10	201	Leroy Coleman^{#}	F	United States	Utah Jazz	Middle Tennessee (Sr.)
10	202	Earl Sango^{#}	G	United States	Denver Nuggets	Regis (Sr.)
10	203	Billy Foster^{#}	G	United States	Chicago Bulls	Eastern Montana (Sr.)
10	New Jersey Nets (forfeited due to selection of ineligible player) (Note: The Nets selected Rudy Macklin of the LSU Tigers. Macklin had been granted an extra year of collegiate eligibility by the National Collegiate Athletic Association (NCAA) and did not declare hardship status for the draft.)					
10	204	John Bates^{#}	F	United States	Indiana Pacers	West Virginia Wesleyan (Sr.)
10	205	Dave Kufeld^{#}	F	United States (Note: Kufeld later gained Israeli citizenship.)	Portland Trail Blazers	Yeshiva (Sr.)
10	206	Tom Morgan^{#}	F	United States	Dallas Mavericks	Cal State Fullerton (Sr.)
10	207	Don Youman^{#}	F	United States	Washington Bullets	Oklahoma State (Sr.)
10	208	Gerard Ross^{#}	F	United States	New York Knicks	Grand Canyon (Sr.)
10	209	Steve Schall^{#}	F	United States	San Antonio Spurs	Athletes in Action
10	Houston Rockets (forfeited due to selection of ineligible player) (Note: The Rockets selected Ed Turner of the Texas A&I Javelinas. Turner had been granted an extra year of collegiate eligibility by the National Collegiate Athletic Association (NCAA) and did not declare hardship status for the draft.)					
10	Kansas City Kings (forfeited due to selection of ineligible player) (Note: The Kings selected Johnny Nash of the Arizona State Sun Devils. Nash had been granted an extra year of collegiate eligibility by the National Collegiate Athletic Association (NCAA) and did not declare hardship status for the draft.)					
10	210	Melvin Crayton^{#}	F	United States	Milwaukee Bucks	Alabama State (Sr.)
10	Atlanta Hawks (forfeited due to selection of ineligible player) (Note: The Hawks selected Mickey Dillard of the Florida State Seminoles. Dillard had been granted an extra year of collegiate eligibility by the National Collegiate Athletic Association (NCAA) and did not declare hardship status for the draft.)					
10	211	Randy Carroll^{#}	F	United States	Phoenix Suns	Kansas (Sr.)
10	212	Kent Williams^{#}	G	United States	Seattle SuperSonics	Texas Tech (Sr.)
10	213	Joe Hand^{#}	G	United States	Philadelphia 76ers	King's College (Pennsylvania) (Sr.)
10	214	John Nolan^{#}	G	United States	Boston Celtics	Providence (Sr.)

== Notable undrafted players ==
These players were not selected in the 1980 draft but played at least one game in the NBA.

Player	Pos.	Nationality	School/club team
Jim Brogan	G	United States	West Virginia Wesleyan (Sr.)

== Trades ==
=== Draft-day trades ===
The following trades involving drafted players were made on the day of the draft.

- ^{A 1} ^{2} The Portland Trail Blazers acquired the draft rights to fourth pick Kelvin Ransey and a 1981 first-round pick from the Chicago Bulls in exchange for the draft rights to tenth pick Ronnie Lester and a 1981 first-round pick.
- ^{B} The Washington Bullets acquired the draft rights to 25th pick Jeff Ruland from the Golden State Warriors in exchange for a 1981 second-round pick.

=== Pre-draft trades ===
Prior to the day of the draft, the following trades were made and resulted in exchanges of picks between the teams.

- ^{a 1} ^{2} ^{3} On June 9, 1980, the Golden State Warriors acquired the first and the thirteenth pick from the Boston Celtics in exchange for Robert Parish and the third pick. Previously, the Celtics acquired two first-round picks on September 6, 1979, from the Detroit Pistons in exchange for Bob McAdoo. This trade was arranged as compensation when the Celtics signed M. L. Carr on July 24, 1979. Previously, the Pistons acquired 1980 and 1982 first-round picks on July 12, 1979, from the Washington Bullets as compensation for the signing of Kevin Porter as a free agent. The Warriors used the picks to draft Joe Barry Carroll and Rickey Brown. The Celtics used the pick to draft Kevin McHale.
- ^{b} On February 8, 1980, the New Jersey Nets acquired Maurice Lucas, 1980 and 1981 first-round picks from the Portland Trail Blazers in exchange for Calvin Natt. Previously, the Blazers acquired Kermit Washington, Kevin Kunnert and the pick on May 13, 1979, from the San Diego Clippers as compensation for the signing of Bill Walton as a free agent. The Nets used the pick to draft Mike Gminski.
- ^{c} On November 2, 1976, the Philadelphia 76ers acquired a first-round pick from the Indiana Pacers in exchange for Mel Bennett. The 76ers used the pick to draft Andrew Toney.
- ^{d} On September 21, 1979, the San Diego Clippers acquired a first-round pick from the Cleveland Cavaliers in exchange for Randy Smith. The Clippers used the pick to draft Michael Brooks.
- ^{e} On July 16, 1979, the Washington Bullets acquired a first-round pick from the Houston Rockets as compensation for the signing of Tom Henderson as a free agent. The Bullets used the pick to draft Wes Matthews.
- ^{f} On February 4, 1980, the Detroit Pistons acquired Kent Benson and a first-round pick from the Milwaukee Bucks in exchange for Bob Lanier. The Pistons used the pick to draft Larry Drew.
- ^{g} On January 12, 1979, the Utah Jazz acquired Marty Byrnes, Ron Lee, 1979 and 1980 first-round picks from the Phoenix Suns in exchange for Truck Robinson. The Jazz used the pick to draft John Duren.
- ^{h} On February 15, 1980, the Cleveland Cavaliers acquired Don Ford and a 1980 first-round pick from the Los Angeles Lakers in exchange for Butch Lee and a 1982 first-round pick. The Cavaliers used the pick to draft Chad Kinch.
- ^{i} On February 1, 1980, the Denver Nuggets acquired Alex English and a first-round pick from the Indiana Pacers in exchange for George McGinnis. Previously, the Pacers acquired the pick on July 19, 1978, from the Boston Celtics in exchange for Earl Tatum. The Nuggets used the pick to draft Carl Nicks.
- ^{j} On October 9, 1978, the Golden State Warriors acquired a second-round pick from the Detroit Pistons in exchange for Rickey Green. The Warriors used the pick to draft Larry Smith.
- ^{k} On October 9, 1978, the Chicago Bulls acquired Oliver Mack, 1980 and 1981 second-round picks from the Los Angeles Lakers in exchange for Mark Landsberger. Previously, the Lakers acquired 1977, 1978 and 1979 first-round picks, and a 1980 second-round pick on August 5, 1976, from the Utah Jazz in exchange for a 1978 first-round pick and a 1977 second-round pick. This trade was arranged as compensation when the Jazz signed Gail Goodrich on July 19, 1976. The Bulls used the pick to draft Sam Worthen.

== Early entrants ==
=== College underclassmen ===
For the third year in a row, no underclassmen that qualified for entry in the NBA draft would withdraw their entry into the event, with this year's draft seeing an improvement with seven official players that qualified for the event. The following college basketball players successfully applied for early draft entrance.

- (United States) Joe Cammarano – F, Los Angeles Mission (junior)
- (United States) Wes Matthews – G, Wisconsin (junior)
- (United States) Randy Owens – F, Philadelphia Textile (sophomore)
- (United States) William Phillips – F, Tennessee–Chattanooga (junior)
- (United States) Jeff Ruland – C, Iona (junior)
- (United States) DeWayne Scales – F, LSU (junior)
- (United States) Ron Webb – F, Oklahoma (junior)

Bobby Turner of the Louisville Cardinals was granted an exemption to stay eligible for the draft despite him not declaring after he dropped out prior to his senior season (with him ultimately being selected by the New York Knicks in the seventh round this year).

== Invited attendees ==
The 1980 NBA draft is considered to be the third ever NBA draft to have utilized what's properly considered the "green room" experience for NBA prospects. The NBA's green room is a staging area where anticipated draftees often sit with their families and representatives, waiting for their names to be called on draft night. Often being positioned either in front of or to the side of the podium (in this case, being positioned in the Sheraton Centre Hotel's Grand Ballroom), once a player heard his name, he would walk to the podium to shake hands and take promotional photos with the NBA commissioner. From there, the players often conducted interviews with various media outlets while backstage. However, once the NBA draft started to air nationally on TV starting with the 1980 NBA draft, the green room evolved from players waiting to hear their name called and then shaking hands with these select players who were often called to the hotel to take promotional pictures with the NBA commissioner a day or two after the draft concluded to having players in real-time waiting to hear their names called up and then shaking hands with Larry O'Brien, the NBA's commissioner. The NBA compiled its list of green room invites through collective voting by the NBA's team presidents and general managers alike, which in this year's case belonged to only what they believed were the top six prospects at the time. As such, the following players were invited to attend this year's draft festivities live and in person.

- (United States) Joe Barry Carroll – PF/C, Purdue
- (United States) Mike Gminski – C, Duke
- (United States) Darrell Griffith – SG, Louisville
- (United States) Kevin McHale – PF/C, Minnesota
- (United States) Mike O'Koren – SG/SF, North Carolina
- (United States) / (Canada) / (West Germany) Kiki VanDeWeghe – SF, UCLA

== See also ==
- List of first overall NBA draft picks
