= Rick Raivio =

American basketball player

Personal information
- Born: Portland, Oregon
- Listed height: 6 ft 5 in (1.96 m)
- Listed weight: 210 lb (95 kg)

Career information
- High school: Benson (Portland, Oregon)
- College: Portland (1976–1980)
- NBA draft: 1980: 5th round, 114th overall pick
- Drafted by: Los Angeles Lakers
- Playing career: 1980–1992
- Position: Guard
- Stats at Basketball Reference

Richard Raivio is an American former professional basketball player.

== Career ==
In high school, Raivio played basketball and football for Benson in Portland, Oregon. In basketball, he was a member of three PIL (Portland Interscholastic League) championship teams and won two state championships. He was inducted into the Portland Interscholastic League Sports Hall of Fame.

In his four-year college career at the University of Portland, Raivio scored 1668 points, which put him second on the all-time scoring list. He grabbed an all-time leading 910 rebounds and also ranked first in field goal percentage (.575) and free throws made (454). He was a three time All-West Coast Athletic Conference selection, the 1979 University of Portland Athlete of the Year and a Scholastic All-American in 1980. He was inducted into the Portland Pilots’ Hall of Fame in 1991. A 6’5’’ forward, Raivio was drafted 163th overall by the Philadelphia 76ers in the 1979 NBA draft. In the 1980 NBA draft, the Los Angeles Lakers selected him 114th overall. In the summer of 1981, Raivio attended the Los Angeles Lakers' rookie camp and played in the Los Angeles Summer League.

Raivio spent his professional career in Europe. He played under American coach Gary Lawrence at Pully Basket in Switzerland. On November 3, 1982, playing in the European competition FIBA Korać Cup with Pully, he scored 40 points against KK Zadar from Yugoslavia, a team which included Stojko Vranković who later would play in the NBA. From 1985 to 1987, Raivio played for Racing Mechelen in Belgium, where he was known as an all-around player.

He went on to play in France. Raivio averaged 30.7 points, 11.5 rebounds as well as 4.9 assists per game for ProB side Montpellier in 1987–88, helping the team move up to the French elite league. In the country's top division, he continued his high scoring ways, averaging 30.2 points per contest in 1988-89 for Montpellier, to go along with 9.9 rebounds and 3.9 assists a game. From 1989 to 1991, he played for AS Monaco in the French league, before rounding out his professional career at Villeurbanne in 1991–92. Subsequently, Raivio returned to the US, settling in the Vancouver area in the state of Washington, where he became a real estate agent.

He is the father of Derek Raivio and Nik Raivio, who both became professional basketball players, and Matt Raivio, who played college basketball.
