= Jim Smith (basketball, born 1958) =

American basketball player

Personal information
- Born: April 12, 1958 (age 68) Cleveland, Ohio, U.S.
- Listed height: 6 ft 9 in (2.06 m)
- Listed weight: 225 lb (102 kg)

Career information
- High school: East Technical (Cleveland, Ohio)
- College: Ohio State (1977–1981)
- NBA draft: 1981: 3rd round, 54th overall pick
- Drafted by: San Diego Clippers
- Position: Power forward
- Number: 30, 32

Career history
- 1981–1982: San Diego Clippers
- 1982–1983: Detroit Pistons
- 1982–1983: Reno Bighorns
- 1982–1983: Wyoming Wildcatters
- Stats at NBA.com
- Stats at Basketball Reference

James Oliver Smith (born April 12, 1958) is an American former National Basketball Association (NBA) player. While playing at Ohio State University, Smith averaged 6.9 points and 5.4 rebounds per game in four seasons. He was drafted eighth pick in the third round of the 1981 NBA draft by the San Diego Clippers. Smith was waived by the Clippers on October 27, 1982, and was then signed by the Detroit Pistons on December 28, 1982. In his NBA career, Smith averaged 2.9 points and 2.5 rebounds per game. Smith also played in the Continental Basketball Association, splitting the 1982–83 season between the Reno Bighorns and the Wyoming Wildcatters, averaging 16.3 points and 5.2 rebounds in 78 games.

== Career statistics ==
Legend
GP	Games played	GS	Games started	MPG	Minutes per game
FG%	Field goal percentage	3P%	3-point field goal percentage	FT%	Free throw percentage
RPG	Rebounds per game	APG	Assists per game	SPG	Steals per game
BPG	Blocks per game	PPG	Points per game	**Bold**	Career high

=== NBA ===
==== Regular season ====
Year	Team	GP	GS	MPG	FG%	3P%	FT%	RPG	APG	SPG	BPG	PPG
1981–82	San Diego	**72**	**3**	**11.9**	.509	–	.459	**2.5**	**.6**	**.3**	**.7**	**2.9**
1982–83	Detroit	4	0	4.5	**.750**	–	**.500**	1.3	.0	.0	.0	2.0
Career		76	3	11.5	.514	–	.461	2.5	.6	.3	.7	2.9
