= Jim Brogan (basketball) =

American basketball player

Personal information
- Born: February 24, 1958 (age 68) Ardmore, Pennsylvania
- Listed height: 6 ft 7 in (2.01 m)
- Listed weight: 185 lb (84 kg)

Career information
- High school: Lower Merion (Ardmore, Pennsylvania)
- College: West Virginia Wesleyan (1976–1980)
- NBA draft: 1980: undrafted
- Position: Guard
- Number: 15

Career history
- 1980–1981: Atlantic City Hi-Rollers
- 1981–1983: San Diego Clippers
- 1986–1987: Mississippi Jets
- Stats at NBA.com
- Stats at Basketball Reference

James Riley Brogan (born February 24, 1958) is a retired American basketball player.

Born in Merion Station, Pennsylvania, he played collegiately for the West Virginia Wesleyan College.

He played for the San Diego Clippers (1981–83) in the NBA for 121 games. He is currently coaching basketball players, primarily working on their shooting form. He has also trained with professional sports figures to improve their balance and coordination. He had 619 points in his NBA career.

== Career statistics ==
Legend
GP	Games played	GS	Games started	MPG	Minutes per game
FG%	Field goal percentage	3P%	3-point field goal percentage	FT%	Free throw percentage
RPG	Rebounds per game	APG	Assists per game	SPG	Steals per game
BPG	Blocks per game	PPG	Points per game	**Bold**	Career high

=== NBA ===
==== Regular season ====
Year	Team	GP	GS	MPG	FG%	3P%	FT%	RPG	APG	SPG	BPG	PPG
1981–82	San Diego	**63**	**19**	**16.3**	**.453**	**.281**	.726	**1.9**	**2.5**	**.8**	**.2**	**6.3**
1982–83	San Diego	58	0	8.0	.427	.231	**.791**	1.1	1.1	.4	**.2**	3.8
Career		121	19	12.3	.444	.267	.748	1.5	1.8	.6	.2	5.1
