= Rock Lee (basketball) =

American basketball player

Personal information
- Born: May 1, 1955 (age 71) La Jolla, California, U.S.
- Listed height: 6 ft 10 in (2.08 m)
- Listed weight: 220 lb (100 kg)

Career information
- High school: Madison (San Diego, California)
- College: California (1973–1976); San Diego State (1977–1978)
- NBA draft: 1978: undrafted
- Position: Center
- Number: 34

Career history
- 1982: San Diego Clippers
- Stats at NBA.com
- Stats at Basketball Reference

Rock Alan Lee (born May 1, 1955, in La Jolla, California) is an American former professional basketball center who played one season in the National Basketball Association (NBA) as a member of the San Diego Clippers during the 1981–82 season. The 6 feet 10 inches tall Lee attended the University of California and San Diego State University.

== Career statistics ==
Legend
GP	Games played	GS	Games started	MPG	Minutes per game
FG%	Field goal percentage	3P%	3-point field goal percentage	FT%	Free throw percentage
RPG	Rebounds per game	APG	Assists per game	SPG	Steals per game
BPG	Blocks per game	PPG	Points per game	**Bold**	Career high

=== NBA ===
==== Regular season ====
Year	Team	GP	GS	MPG	FG%	3P%	FT%	RPG	APG	SPG	BPG	PPG
1981–82	San Diego	2	0	5.0	.500	–	.000	.5	1.0	.0	.0	1.0
