= John Douglas (basketball) =

American basketball player & coach

Personal information
- Born: June 12, 1956 (age 70) Town Creek, Alabama, U.S.
- Listed height: 6 ft 2 in (1.88 m)
- Listed weight: 170 lb (77 kg)

Career information
- High school: Colbert County (Leighton, Alabama)
- College: Calhoun CC (1974–1976); Kansas (1976–1978)
- NBA draft: 1978: 6th round, 118th overall pick
- Drafted by: New Orleans Jazz
- Playing career: 1980–1990
- Position: Point guard
- Number: 13
- Coaching career: 1990–present

Career history

Playing
- 1980–1981: Montana Golden Nuggets
- 1981–1982: San Diego Clippers
- 1982–1983: Montana Golden Nuggets
- 1983–1987: Fortitudo Bologna
- 1987–1988: Reims
- 1990: Virtus Bologna

Coaching
- 1990–1995: Calhoun CC (assistant)
- 1995–2001: Calhoun CC
- 2001–2003: Gulf Coast CC
- 2003–2009: Lawson State CC
- 2009–2011: Fort Valley State

Career highlights
- 2× All-CBA Second Team (1981, 1983); CBA All-Defensive First Team (1983); First-team All-Big Eight (1977)
- Stats at NBA.com
- Stats at Basketball Reference

John David Douglas (born June 12, 1956) is an American basketball coach and former professional player. He played in the National Basketball Association (NBA) for the San Diego Clippers.

== Amateur career ==
A 6-foot-2-inch (1.88 m) guard from Leighton, Alabama, Douglas played basketball at Colbert County High School, two years behind his brother Leon Douglas, who would also play in the NBA. Douglas stayed local initially for his collegiate career, playing basketball at Calhoun Community College where his freshman season saw the Warhawks go 27–3, earning a #3 national ranking. After two excellent seasons at Calhoun, where he still holds numerous scoring records, Douglas transferred to the University of Kansas, scoring 19.2 ppg in his first season in Lawrence. His senior year saw his scoring drop-off (12.7 ppg) on a deeper Kansas squad with two other future NBA players in Darnell Valentine and Paul Mokeski, as Kansas advanced to the 1978 NCAA Division I Basketball Tournament, losing in the opening round 83–76 to UCLA.

A college highlight for Douglas was his 46 points on the road against Iowa State on February 16, 1977, when he broke the legendary Wilt Chamberlain's record for most points scored by a visiting player in the Big Eight Conference. At Kansas, John earned All Big Eight honors, Honorable Mention All American, Newcomer of the Year and a team MVP for the Jayhawks.

== Professional career ==
Douglas was drafted in the 7th round (118 over pick) by the New Orleans Jazz in the 1978 NBA draft. He was waived by the Jazz in the pre-season and played for the Utah Prospectors of the Western Basketball Association in the 1978–79 season. The WBA would fold at the end of the season. Douglas would then spend two seasons in the CBA with the Montana Golden Nuggets, and played for the championship in 1981 (losing to the Rochester Zeniths 4–0) under head coach George Karl, as Douglas averaged a team high 22.8 ppg. He tried out for the Kansas City Kings in the 1980 pre-season, but was released in training camp.

Proving third times a charm, another NBA pre-season audition in 1981 produced the desired result as Douglas made the roster for the San Diego Clippers. He would spend the 1981-82 San Diego Clippers season with the team, averaging 7.0 ppg, 2.3 apg, in 16.1 mpg played in 64 games. He would make the team again for the 1982-83 San Diego season, but was cut after 3 games, bringing his NBA career to a close. In total, he averaged 6.7 ppg and 2.2 apg in the NBA. Douglas would return to Montana and the CBA to finish the season, averaging 22.3 ppg as the team returned again to the CBA championship game, losing to the Detroit Spirits 4–3.

Montana folded the CBA team in 1983, and Douglas then pursued overseas opportunities, heading to Serie A in Italy, with Fortitudo Bologna (1983–87), playing with his brother Leon for three years, and then to Reims in France and LNB Pro A for two season (1987–1989), averaging 24.9 ppg and then 24.8 ppg in his two seasons. Douglas would return briefly to Italy finish his professional career with Virtus Bologna in 1990 before retiring.

== Coaching career ==
Douglas returned to Alabama and began his coaching career as an assistant at Calhoun Community College in 1990, and was promoted to head coach in 1995. Calhoun advanced to the 2000 NJCAA Men's Division I Basketball Championship game, losing to Southeastern Community College 84–70. A three-time Coach of the Year winner, Douglas was selected to be an assistant coach with the gold medal-winning 2000 United States men's Olympic basketball team. He was the head coach at Gulf Coast Community College (now Gulf Coast State College) from 2001 to 2003.

Douglas left Gulf Coast to become the head coach and athletic director at Lawson State Community College in 2003, and in 2009 became the head coach at Fort Valley State University, a HBCU in Georgia, and was dismissed after two seasons, going 17–40. John then joined his brother Leon, serving as an assistant coach for his brother, first at Tuskegee University and then at Miles College.

== Personal life ==
John was inducted into the Calhoun County Sports Hall of Fame in 2004 and currently lives in Auburn, Alabama with his wife, Xenia and their two kids, Xsuela and GianMarco.

== Career statistics ==
Legend
GP	Games played	GS	Games started	MPG	Minutes per game
FG%	Field goal percentage	3P%	3-point field goal percentage	FT%	Free throw percentage
RPG	Rebounds per game	APG	Assists per game	SPG	Steals per game
BPG	Blocks per game	PPG	Points per game	**Bold**	Career high

=== NBA ===
==== Regular season ====
Year	Team	GP	GS	MPG	FG%	3P%	FT%	RPG	APG	SPG	BPG	PPG
1981–82	San Diego	**64**	**9**	**16.1**	**.465**	.305	.657	**1.4**	**2.3**	**.8**	**.1**	**7.0**
1982–83	San Diego	3	1	4.0	.167	**.500**	**1.000**	.3	.3	.0	.0	1.7
Career		67	10	15.6	.461	.311	.663	1.4	2.2	.7	.1	6.7
