= Michael Wiley (basketball) =

American basketball player (born 1957)

Personal information
- Born: October 16, 1957 (age 69) New Orleans, Louisiana, U.S.
- Listed height: 6 ft 9 in (2.06 m)
- Listed weight: 200 lb (91 kg)

Career information
- High school: Long Beach Polytechnic (Long Beach, California)
- College: Long Beach State (1976–1980)
- NBA draft: 1980: 2nd round, 39th overall pick
- Drafted by: San Antonio Spurs
- Playing career: 1980–1990
- Position: Small forward
- Number: 33, 21

Career history
- 1980–1981: San Antonio Spurs
- 1981–1982: San Diego Clippers
- 1982–1985: Elmex Leiden
- 1986–1988: AS Monaco
- 1989–1990: Avignon
- 1990–1991: Vevey Basket
- Stats at NBA.com
- Stats at Basketball Reference

Michael Anthony Wiley (born October 16, 1957) is an American former basketball player. He was a 6-foot-9-inch (2.06 m), 200-pound (91 kg) small forward and attended Long Beach State.

== Career ==
=== College ===
Wiley attended Long Beach State University, where he played for coach Dwight Jones for two years, then under Hall of Fame coach Tex Winter for two years. Wiley was named Pacific Coast Athletic Association Tournament MVP as a freshman for the 1976–77 season, and was named to the PCAA all-tourney team in 1978 and 1980. He led the team in scoring twice, during the 1977–78 and 1979–1980 seasons. His 697 points in the 1979–80 season stands as the second best for a single season. In the 1978–79 season, Wiley led the team in blocked shots at 1.9 per game. He tied for the most points scored by a 49er in a postseason game with 31, and scored the most field goals in a postseason game, 14, both of which were accomplished against Pepperdine in the 1980 National Invitation Tournament (NIT).

Wiley ended his career as an All-American. He was named to the Pacific Coast Athletic Association all-conference first team, after he was awarded second team distinction his first three seasons. As of the start of the 2010–11 basketball season, Wiley held the record for most career and season field goals made, with 814 and 295 respectively. His .570 career shooting percentage stands as the best in 49er history, and he was the second highest career rebounder as well.

In 1993, Wiley was inducted into the Long Beach State Athletic Hall of Fame.

=== Professional ===
Wiley played for the San Antonio Spurs of the NBA during the 1980–81 season, averaging 5.7 points and 1.9 rebounds per game in 8.5 minutes. He was originally selected by the Spurs with the 16th pick in the second round of the 1980 NBA draft. The following season, he played for the San Diego Clippers, averaging 8.3 points and 3.0 rebounds per game in 12.0 minutes, making him one of the most accurate and proficient scorers in NBA history. He shot a consistent .565 or 57% from the field and averaged 11 minutes per game. Wiley had one of the highest points per minutes played rating in NBA history. He shot 56.1% in two seasons as a small forward and consistently shot over 57% for his entire basketball career and in the league.

== Personal life ==
Wiley is the older brother of fellow NBA alum Morlon Wiley.

== Career statistics ==
Legend
GP	Games played	GS	Games started	MPG	Minutes per game
FG%	Field goal percentage	3P%	3-point field goal percentage	FT%	Free throw percentage
RPG	Rebounds per game	APG	Assists per game	SPG	Steals per game
BPG	Blocks per game	PPG	Points per game	**Bold**	Career high

=== NBA ===
==== Regular season ====
Year	Team	GP	GS	MPG	FG%	3P%	FT%	RPG	APG	SPG	BPG	PPG
1980–81	San Antonio	33		8.2	.551	.000	**.750**	1.9	.3	.2	.2	3.7
1981–82	San Diego	**61**	1	**16.6**	**.565**	.000	.695	**3.0**	**.9**	**.7**	**.3**	**8.3**
Career		94	1	13.7	.561	.000	.709	2.6	.7	.5	.2	7.4

==== Playoffs ====
Year	Team	GP	MPG	FG%	3P%	FT%	RPG	APG	SPG	BPG	PPG
1981	San Antonio	3	1.7	.000	–	1.000	.0	.0	.0	.0	.7
