= List of foreign NBA drafted players =

The following is a list of non-American players, both past and current, who have been drafted by an NBA team.

Draft	Pick	Picked by	Player	Nationality	Ref.
1962	29	New York Knicks	Clifford Luyk	Spain	
1965	12	Baltimore Bullets	Tal Brody	Israel	
1967	145	Philadelphia 76ers	Wayne Brabender	Spain	
1970	167	Atlanta Hawks	Manuel Raga	Mexico	
1970	182	Atlanta Hawks	Dino Meneghin	Italy	
1971	71	Portland Trail Blazers	Hector Blondet	Puerto Rico	
1971	234	San Diego Rockets	Carlos Quintanar	Mexico	
1973	16	Milwaukee Bucks	Swen Nater	Netherlands	
1973	20	Kansas City-Omaha Kings	Mike D'Antoni	Italy	
1973	38	Buffalo Braves	Ken Charles	Trinidad and Tobago	
1973	84	Los Angeles Lakers	Kresimir Cosic	Yugoslavia	
1973	147	Chicago Bulls	Ruben Montanez	Puerto Rico	
1973	186	Phoenix Suns	Kalevi Sarkalahti	Finland	
1973	211	Buffalo Braves	Phil Tollestrup	Canada	
1974	61	Atlanta Hawks	Ed Palubinskas	Australia	
1974	105	Detroit Pistons	Mike Sylvester	Italy	
1974	144	Milwaukee Bucks	Ralph Palomar	Mexico	
1975	138	Seattle SuperSonics	Ken McKenzie	Canada	
1975	158	Buffalo Braves	George Rautins	Canada	
1975	161	New Orleans Jazz	Alexander Belov	Soviet Union	
1976	37	Chicago Bulls	Lars Hansen	Canada	
1976	162	Portland Trail Blazers	Marcos Leite	Brazil	
1976	165	Milwaukee Bucks	Hugo Cabrera	Panama	
1976	171	Philadelphia 76ers	Elisha McSweeney	Bahamas	
1978	1	Portland Trail Blazers	Mychal Thompson	Bahamas	
1978	10	Atlanta Hawks	Butch Lee	Puerto Rico	
1978	22	Golden State Warriors	Raymond Townsend	Philippines	
1978	89	New Jersey Nets	Cecil Rose	Bahamas	
1978	121	New York Knicks	Eddie Warren	Panama	
1978	128	Phoenix Suns	Charles Thompson	Bahamas	
1978	130	Philadelphia 76ers	Osborne Lockhart	Bahamas	
1978	165	Washington Bullets	Nestor Cora	Puerto Rico	
1978	187	New Jersey Nets	Michael Vicens	Puerto Rico	
1979	59	Houston Rockets	Ricardo Brown	Philippines	
1979	61	Boston Celtics	Ernesto Malcolm	Panama	
1979	64	Phoenix Suns	Al Green	Australia	
1979	68	Boston Celtics	Nikos Galis	Greece	
1979	73	Seattle SuperSonics	James Donaldson	Great Britain	
1979	101	Atlanta Hawks	Kendal Pinder	Bahamas	
1979	155	Golden State Warriors	Mario Butler	Panama	
1980	60	San Antonio Spurs	LaVon Mercer	Israel	
1980	125	Portland Trail Blazers	Perry Mirkovich	Canada	
1980	161	Detroit Pistons	Leroy Loggins	Australia	
1980	205	Portland Trail Blazers	Dave Kufeld	Israel	
1981	9	Dallas Mavericks	Rolando Blackman	Panama	
1981	42	Los Angeles Lakers	Elvis Rolle	Bahamas	
1981	61	Portland Trail Blazers	Petur Gudmundsson	Iceland	
1981	69	Boston Celtics	John Johnson	Great Britain	
1981	73	Utah Jazz	Georgie Torres	Puerto Rico	
1981	83	Indiana Pacers	Rolando Frazer	Panama	
1981	101	Denver Nuggets	Willie Sims	Israel	
1981	115	Boston Celtics	Glen Grunwald	Canada	
1981	171	Golden State Warriors	Yasutaka Okayama	Japan	
1981	179	Los Angeles Lakers	Jay Triano	Canada	
1981	181	Milwaukee Bucks	Mike Brkovich	Canada	
1982	38	Golden State Warriors	Wayne Sappleton	Jamaica	
1982	49	Utah Jazz	Steve Trumbo	Spain	
1982	136	Los Angeles Lakers	Lynden Rose	Bahamas	
1982	146	Indiana Pacers	Brad Leaf	Israel	
1982	176	Houston Rockets	Dan Callandrillo	Italy	
1982	196	Washington Bullets	James Terry	Israel	
1982	205	Boston Celtics	Panagiotis Giannakis	Greece	
1982	214	Detroit Pistons	David Coulthard	Canada	
1983	15	Denver Nuggets	Howard Carter	France	
1983	17	Philadelphia 76ers	Leo Rautins	Canada	
1983	24	Cleveland Cavaliers	Stewart Granger	Canada	
1983	75	Chicago Bulls	Ron Crevier	Canada	
1983	207	Indiana Pacers	Mark Smed	West Germany	
1984	1	Houston Rockets	Hakeem Olajuwon	Nigeria	
1984	29	Indiana Pacers	Stuart Gray	Panama	
1984	43	Chicago Bulls	Gregory Wiltjer	Canada	
1984	63	New Jersey Nets	Yommy Sangodeyi	Nigeria	
1984	106	Seattle SuperSonics	Eli Pasquale	Canada	
1984	131	New Jersey Nets	Oscar Schmidt	Brazil	
1984	161	Los Angeles Lakers	Richard Haenisch	West Germany	
1985	1	New York Knicks	Patrick Ewing	Jamaica	
1985	8	Dallas Mavericks	Detlef Schrempf	West Germany	
1985	16	Dallas Mavericks	Bill Wennington	Canada	
1985	17	Dallas Mavericks	Uwe Blab	West Germany	
1985	25	Portland Trail Blazers	Mike Smrek	Canada	
1985	31	Washington Bullets	Manute Bol	Sudan	
1985	36	New Jersey Nets	Yvon Joseph	Haiti	
1985	38	New Jersey Nets	Fernando Martín	Spain	
1985	52	Los Angeles Clippers	Anicet Lavodrama	Central African Republic	
1985	62	New Jersey Nets	Nigel Miguel	Belize	
1985	97	Seattle SuperSonics	Lou Stefanovic	Yugoslavia	
1985	101	Cleveland Cavaliers	Gunther Behnke	West Germany	
1985	115	Los Angeles Lakers	Timo Saarelainen	Finland	
1985	126	Chicago Bulls	Dan Meagher	Canada	
1985	148	Phoenix Suns	Georgi Glouchkov	Bulgaria	
1986	24	Portland Trail Blazers	Arvydas Sabonis	Soviet Union	
1986	34	Sacramento Kings	Johnny Rogers	Spain	
1986	37	Portland Trail Blazers	Panagiotis Fasoulas	Greece	
1986	40	Atlanta Hawks	Augusto Binelli	Italy	
1986	60	Portland Trail Blazers	Dražen Petrović	Yugoslavia	
1986	82	Washington Bullets	Barry Mungar	Canada	
1986	94	New York Knicks	Jerome Mincy	Puerto Rico	
1986	134	Atlanta Hawks	Alexander Volkov	Soviet Union	
1986	157	Atlanta Hawks	Valeri Tikhonenko	Soviet Union	
1987	8	Chicago Bulls	Olden Polynice	Haiti	
1987	15	Utah Jazz	José Ortiz	Puerto Rico	
1987	16	Philadelphia 76ers	Chris Welp	West Germany	
1987	36	Washington Bullets	Duane Washington	West Germany	
1987	43	Philadelphia 76ers	Andrew Kennedy	Jamaica	
1987	51	Sacramento Kings	Sven Myer	West Germany	
1987	57	Philadelphia 76ers	Hansi Gnad	West Germany	
1987	67	Atlanta Hawks	Song Tao	China	
1987	90	Atlanta Hawks	Fanis Christodoulou	Greece	
1987	113	Atlanta Hawks	José Antonio Montero	Spain	
1987	127	Golden State Warriors	Šarūnas Marčiulionis	Soviet Union	
1987	136	Atlanta Hawks	Riccardo Morandou	Italy	
1987	159	Atlanta Hawks	Franjo Arapović	Yugoslavia	
1987	161	Los Angeles Lakers	Ron Vanderschaaf	Netherlands	
1988	2	Indiana Pacers	Rik Smits	Netherlands	
1988	9	Miami Heat	Rony Seikaly	Lebanon	
1988	26	Portland Trail Blazers	Rolando Ferreira	Brazil	
1988	39	Milwaukee Bucks	Tito Horford	Dominican Republic	
1988	49	Dallas Mavericks	José Vargas	Dominican Republic	
1988	54	Atlanta Hawks	Jorge González	Argentina	
1988	57	Philadelphia 76ers	Hernán Montenegro	Argentina	
1988	67	Utah Jazz	Ricky Grace	Australia	
1989	26	Los Angeles Lakers	Vlade Divac	Yugoslavia	
1989	40	Boston Celtics	Dino Rađa	Yugoslavia	
1990	25	Portland Trail Blazers	Alaa Abdelnaby	Egypt	
1990	29	Chicago Bulls	Toni Kukoč	Yugoslavia	
1990	30	Miami Heat	Carl Herrera	Venezuela	
1990	50	Phoenix Suns	Miloš Babić	Yugoslavia	
1990	52	Cleveland Cavaliers	Stefano Rusconi	Italy	
1991	4	Denver Nuggets	Dikembe Mutombo	Zaire	
1991	7	Minnesota Timberwolves	Luc Longley	Australia	
1991	24	Boston Celtics	Rick Fox	Canada	
1991	44	Philadelphia 76ers	Álvaro Teherán	Colombia	
1991	51	Houston Rockets	Žan Tabak	Croatia	
1992	43	Golden State Warriors	Predrag Danilović	FR Yugoslavia	
1992	49	Phoenix Suns	Ron Ellis	Belgium	
1993	2	Philadelphia 76ers	Shawn Bradley	Germany	
1993	26	Orlando Magic	Geert Hammink	Netherlands	
1993	30	Washington Bullets	Gheorghe Mureșan	Romania	
1993	34	Golden State Warriors	Darnell Mee	Australia	
1993	46	Houston Rockets	Richard Petruška	Slovakia	
1993	50	Houston Rockets	Marcelo Nicola	Argentina	
1993	51	Indiana Pacers	Spencer Dunkley	Great Britain	
1994	14	New Jersey Nets	Yinka Dare	Nigeria	
1994	36	Boston Celtics	Andrei Fetisov	Russia	
1994	41	Indiana Pacers	William Njoku	Canada	
1994	50	Phoenix Suns	Charles Claxton	United States Virgin Islands	
1994	54	Seattle SuperSonics	Željko Rebrača	FR Yugoslavia	
1995	22	Charlotte Hornets	George Zidek	Czech Republic	
1995	31	Chicago Bulls	Dragan Tarlać	FR Yugoslavia	
1995	51	Sacramento Kings	Dejan Bodiroga	FR Yugoslavia	
1995	53	Los Angeles Clippers	Constantin Popa	Romania	
1995	54	Seattle SuperSonics	Eurelijus Žukauskas	Lithuania	
1996	12	Cleveland Cavaliers	Vitaly Potapenko	Ukraine	
1996	14	Sacramento Kings	Peja Stojaković	FR Yugoslavia	
1996	15	Phoenix Suns	Steve Nash	Canada	
1996	20	Cleveland Cavaliers	Zydrunas Ilgauskas	Lithuania	
1996	23	Denver Nuggets	Efthimios Rentzias	Greece	
1996	25	Utah Jazz	Martin Müürsepp	Estonia	
1996	28	Atlanta Hawks	Priest Lauderdale	Bulgaria	
1996	36	Los Angeles Clippers	Doron Sheffer	Israel	
1996	45	Seattle SuperSonics	Joe Vogel	Lebanon	
1996	53	Milwaukee Bucks	Jeff Nordgaard	Poland	
1997	1	San Antonio Spurs	Tim Duncan	U.S. Virgin Islands	
1997	8	Golden State Warriors	Adonal Foyle	Saint Vincent and the Grenadines	
1997	11	Sacramento Kings	Tariq Abdul-Wahad	France	
1997	18	Portland Trail Blazers	Chris Anstey	Australia	
1997	29	Houston Rockets	Serge Zwikker	Netherlands	
1997	33	Philadelphia 76ers	Marko Milič	Slovenia	
1997	48	Washington Bullets	Predrag Drobnjak	FR Yugoslavia	
1997	49	Atlanta Hawks	Alain Digbeu	France	
1997	52	Vancouver Grizzlies	C. J. Bruton	Australia	
1997	53	Los Angeles Lakers	Paul Rogers	Australia	
1997	55	Boston Celtics	Ben Pepper	Australia	
1997	57	Chicago Bulls	Roberto Dueñas	Spain	
1998	1	Los Angeles Clippers	Michael Olowokandi	Nigeria	
1998	9	Milwaukee Bucks	Dirk Nowitzki	Germany	
1998	17	Minnesota Timberwolves	Radoslav Nesterović	Slovenia	
1998	18	Houston Rockets	Mirsad Türkcan	Turkey	
1998	24	San Antonio Spurs	Felipe López	Dominican Republic	
1998	27	Seattle SuperSonics	Vladimir Stepania	(Georgia (country)) Georgia	
1998	35	Dallas Mavericks	Bruno Šundov	Croatia	
1998	44	New York Knicks	Sean Marks	New Zealand	
1998	50	Charlotte Hornets	Andrew Betts	Great Britain	
1998	56	Vancouver Grizzlies	J.R. Henderson	Japan	
1999	12	Toronto Raptors	Aleksandar Radojević	FR Yugoslavia	
1999	15	New York Knicks	Frédéric Weis	France	
1999	17	Atlanta Hawks	Cal Bowdler	Ireland	
1999	24	Utah Jazz	Andrei Kirilenko	Russia	
1999	36	Dallas Mavericks	Wang Zhizhi	China	
1999	37	Washington Wizards	Obinna Ekezie	Nigeria	
1999	40	Dallas Mavericks	Gordan Giriček	Croatia	
1999	41	Denver Nuggets	Francisco Elson	Netherlands	
1999	47	Philadelphia 76ers	Todd MacCulloch	Canada	
1999	57	San Antonio Spurs	Manu Ginóbili	Argentina	
2000	11	Boston Celtics	Jérôme Moïso	France	
2000	16	Sacramento Kings	Hedo Türkoğlu	Turkey	
2000	19	Charlotte Hornets	Jamaal Magloire	Canada	
2000	24	Chicago Bulls	Dalibor Bagarić	Croatia	
2000	25	Phoenix Suns	Jake Tsakalidis	Greece	
2000	26	Denver Nuggets	Mamadou N'Diaye	Senegal	
2000	27	Indiana Pacers	Primož Brezec	Slovenia	
2000	30	Los Angeles Clippers	Marko Jarić	FR Yugoslavia	
2000	36	New Jersey Nets	Soumaila Samake	Mali	
2000	38	Houston Rockets	Eduardo Nájera	Mexico	
2000	40	Atlanta Hawks	Hanno Möttölä	Finland	
2000	42	Seattle SuperSonics	Olumide Oyedeji	Nigeria	
2000	47	Seattle SuperSonics	Josip Sesar	Croatia	
2000	51	Minnesota Timberwolves	Igor Rakočević	FR Yugoslavia	
2001	3	Atlanta Hawks	Pau Gasol	Spain	
2001	8	Cleveland Cavaliers	DeSagana Diop	Senegal	
2001	12	Seattle SuperSonics	Vladimir Radmanović	FR Yugoslavia	
2001	24	Utah Jazz	Raül López	Spain	
2001	26	Philadelphia 76ers	Samuel Dalembert	Canada	
2001	28	San Antonio Spurs	Tony Parker	France	
2001	32	Orlando Magic	Omar Cook	Montenegro	
2001	38	Detroit Pistons	Mehmet Okur	Turkey	
2001	46	Minnesota Timberwolves	Loren Woods	Lebanon	
2001	47	Denver Nuggets	Ousmane Cisse	Mali	
2001	48	Vancouver Grizzlies	Antonis Fotsis	Greece	
2001	50	Portland Trail Blazers	Ruben Boumtje-Boumtje	Cameroon	
2001	56	San Antonio Spurs	Robertas Javtokas	Lithuania	
2001	57	Philadelphia 76ers	Alvin Jones	Luxembourg	
2002	1	Houston Rockets	Yao Ming	China	
2002	5	Denver Nuggets	Nikoloz Tskitishvili	Georgia	
2002	7	New York Knicks	Nenê	Brazil	
2002	15	Houston Rockets	Boštjan Nachbar	Slovenia	
2002	16	Philadelphia 76ers	Jiří Welsch	Czech Republic	
2002	24	New Jersey Nets	Nenad Krstić	FR Yugoslavia	
2002	32	Memphis Grizzlies	Robert Archibald	Great Britain	
2002	34	Milwaukee Bucks	Dan Gadzuric	Netherlands	
2002	36	New York Knicks	Miloš Vujanić	FR Yugoslavia	
2002	37	Atlanta Hawks	David Andersen	Australia	
2002	40	Washington Wizards	Juan Carlos Navarro	Spain	
2002	41	Los Angeles Clippers	Mario Kasun	Croatia	
2002	49	Seattle SuperSonics	Peter Fehse	Germany	
2002	50	Boston Celtics	Darius Songaila	Lithuania	
2002	51	Portland Trail Blazers	Federico Kammerichs	Argentina	
2002	55	Dallas Mavericks	Mladen Šekularac	FR Yugoslavia	
2002	56	San Antonio Spurs	Luis Scola	Argentina	
2002	58	Sacramento Kings	Randy Holcomb	Libya	
2003	2	Detroit Pistons	Darko Miličić	Serbia and Montenegro	
2003	6	Los Angeles Clippers	Chris Kaman	Germany	
2003	10	Washington Wizards	Jarvis Hayes	Qatar	
2003	11	Golden State Warriors	Mickaël Piétrus	France	
2003	17	Phoenix Suns	Žarko Čabarkapa	Serbia and Montenegro	
2003	19	Utah Jazz	Aleksandar Pavlović	Serbia and Montenegro	
2003	21	Atlanta Hawks	Boris Diaw	France	
2003	22	New Jersey Nets	Zoran Planinić	Croatia	
2003	25	Detroit Pistons	Carlos Delfino	Argentina	
2003	26	Minnesota Timberwolves	Ndudi Ebi	Nigeria	
2003	28	San Antonio Spurs	Leandro Barbosa	Brazil	
2003	30	New York Knicks	Maciej Lampe	Poland	
2003	34	Los Angeles Clippers	Sofoklis Schortsanitis	Greece	
2003	35	Milwaukee Bucks	Szymon Szewczyk	Poland	
2003	39	New York Knicks	Slavko Vraneš	Serbia and Montenegro	
2003	42	Orlando Magic	Zaza Pachulia	Georgia	
2003	44	Houston Rockets	Malick Badiane	Senegal	
2003	46	Denver Nuggets	Sani Bečirovič	Slovenia	
2003	50	Philadelphia 76ers	Paccelis Morlende	France	
2003	52	Toronto Raptors	Remon van de Hare	Netherlands	
2003	54	Portland Trail Blazers	Nedžad Sinanović	Bosnia and Herzegovina	
2003	57	Dallas Mavericks	Xue Yuyang	China	
2003	58	Detroit Pistons	Andreas Glyniadakis	Greece	
2004	3	Chicago Bulls	Ben Gordon	Great Britain	
2004	7	Phoenix Suns	Luol Deng	Great Britain	
2004	8	Toronto Raptors	Rafael Araújo	Brazil	
2004	11	Golden State Warriors	Andris Biedriņš	Latvia	
2004	21	Utah Jazz	Pavel Podkolzin	Russia	
2004	22	New Jersey Nets	Victor Khryapa	Russia	
2004	23	Portland Trail Blazers	Sergei Monia	Russia	
2004	27	Los Angeles Lakers	Sasha Vujačić	Slovenia	
2004	28	San Antonio Spurs	Beno Udrih	Slovenia	
2004	30	Orlando Magic	Anderson Varejão	Brazil	
2004	31	Chicago Bulls	Jackson Vroman	Lebanon	
2004	32	Washington Wizards	Peter John Ramos	Puerto Rico	
2004	34	Atlanta Hawks	Donta Smith	Venezuela	
2004	39	Toronto Raptors	Albert Miralles	Spain	
2004	42	Atlanta Hawks	Viktor Sanikidze	Georgia	
2004	46	Portland Trail Blazers	Ha Seung-jin	South Korea	
2004	47	Miami Heat	Pape Sow	Senegal	
2004	49	Memphis Grizzlies	Serhiy Lishchuk	Ukraine	
2004	50	Dallas Mavericks	Vassilis Spanoulis	Greece	
2004	51	New Jersey Nets	Christian Drejer	Denmark	
2004	52	San Antonio Spurs	Romain Sato	Central African Republic	
2004	53	Miami Heat	Matt Freije	Lebanon	
2004	55	Houston Rockets	Luis Flores	Dominican Republic	
2004	56	Los Angeles Lakers	Marcus Douthit	Philippines	
2004	57	San Antonio Spurs	Sergei Karaulov	Russia	
2005	1	Milwaukee Bucks	Andrew Bogut	Australia	
2005	7	Toronto Raptors	Charlie Villanueva	Dominican Republic	
2005	9	Golden State Warriors	Ike Diogu	Nigeria	
2005	11	Orlando Magic	Fran Vázquez	Spain	
2005	12	Los Angeles Clippers	Yaroslav Korolev	Russia	
2005	20	Denver Nuggets	Julius Hodge	Antigua and Barbuda	
2005	23	Sacramento Kings	Francisco García	Dominican Republic	
2005	25	Seattle SuperSonics	Johan Petro	France	
2005	27	Portland Trail Blazers	Linas Kleiza	Lithuania	
2005	28	San Antonio Spurs	Ian Mahinmi	France	
2005	35	Portland Trail Blazers	Ricky Sánchez	Puerto Rico	
2005	36	Milwaukee Bucks	Ersan İlyasova	Turkey	
2005	37	Los Angeles Lakers	Ronny Turiaf	France	
2005	38	Orlando Magic	Travis Diener	Italy	
2005	41	Toronto Raptors	Roko Ukić	Croatia	
2005	43	New Jersey Nets	Mile Ilić	Serbia and Montenegro	
2005	44	Orlando Magic	Martynas Andriuškevičius	Lithuania	
2005	46	Indiana Pacers	Erazem Lorbek	Slovenia	
2005	49	Washington Wizards	Andray Blatche	Philippines	
2005	52	Denver Nuggets	Axel Hervelle	Belgium	
2005	57	Phoenix Suns	Marcin Gortat	Poland	
2005	58	Toronto Raptors	Uroš Slokar	Slovenia	
2005	59	Atlanta Hawks	Cenk Akyol	Turkey	
2006	1	Toronto Raptors	Andrea Bargnani	Italy	
2006	10	Seattle SuperSonics	Mouhamed Sene	Senegal	
2006	13	Philadelphia 76ers	Thabo Sefolosha	Switzerland	
2006	18	Washington Wizards	Oleksiy Pecherov	Ukraine	
2006	19	Sacramento Kings	Quincy Douby	Montenegro	
2006	20	New York Knicks	Renaldo Balkman	Puerto Rico	
2006	27	Phoenix Suns	Sergio Rodríguez	Spain	
2006	30	Portland Trail Blazers	Joel Freeland	Great Britain	
2006	38	Golden State Warriors	Kosta Perović	Serbia	
2006	40	Seattle SuperSonics	Denham Brown	Canada	
2006	43	New Orleans/Oklahoma City Hornets	Marcus Vinicius	Brazil	
2006	44	Orlando Magic	Lior Eliyahu	Israel	
2006	48	Washington Wizards	Vladimir Veremeenko	Belarus	
2006	51	Los Angeles Lakers	Cheikh Samb	Senegal	
2006	52	Los Angeles Clippers	Guillermo Diaz	Puerto Rico	
2006	53	Seattle SuperSonics	Yotam Halperin	Israel	
2006	55	Cleveland Cavaliers	Ejike Ugboaja	Nigeria	
2006	56	Toronto Raptors	Edin Bavčić	Bosnia and Herzegovina	
2006	57	Minnesota Timberwolves	Loukas Mavrokefalidis	Greece	
2006	59	San Antonio Spurs	Damir Markota	Croatia	
2007	3	Atlanta Hawks	Al Horford	Dominican Republic	
2007	6	Milwaukee Bucks	Yi Jianlian	China	
2007	9	Chicago Bulls	Joakim Noah	France	
2007	18	Golden State Warriors	Marco Belinelli	Italy	
2007	24	Phoenix Suns	Rudy Fernández	Spain	
2007	28	San Antonio Spurs	Tiago Splitter	Brazil	
2007	30	Philadelphia 76ers	Petteri Koponen	Finland	
2007	34	Dallas Mavericks	Nick Fazekas	Japan	
2007	38	Philadelphia 76ers	Kyrylo Fesenko	Ukraine	
2007	39	Miami Heat	Stanko Barać	Croatia	
2007	40	Los Angeles Lakers	Sun Yue	China	
2007	46	Golden State Warriors	Stéphane Lasme	Gabon	
2007	48	Los Angeles Lakers	Marc Gasol	Spain	
2007	50	Dallas Mavericks	Renaldas Seibutis	Lithuania	
2007	52	Portland Trail Blazers	Taurean Green	Georgia	
2007	54	Houston Rockets	Brad Newley	Australia	
2007	57	Detroit Pistons	Sammy Mejía	Dominican Republic	
2007	58	San Antonio Spurs	Georgios Printezis	Greece	
2007	60	Dallas Mavericks	Milovan Raković	Serbia	
2008	6	New York Knicks	Danilo Gallinari	Italy	
2008	7	Los Angeles Clippers	Eric Gordon	Bahamas	
2008	17	Toronto Raptors	Roy Hibbert	Jamaica	
2008	20	Charlotte Bobcats	Alexis Ajinça	France	
2008	23	Utah Jazz	Kosta Koufos	Greece	
2008	24	Seattle SuperSonics	Serge Ibaka	Spain	
2008	25	Houston Rockets	Nicolas Batum	France	
2008	31	Minnesota Timberwolves	Nikola Peković	Montenegro	
2008	36	Portland Trail Blazers	Ömer Aşık	Turkey	
2008	37	Milwaukee Bucks	Luc Mbah a Moute	Cameroon	
2008	41	Indiana Pacers	Nathan Jawai	Australia	
2008	43	Sacramento Kings	Patrick Ewing Jr.	Jamaica	
2008	44	Utah Jazz	Ante Tomić	Croatia	
2008	45	San Antonio Spurs	Goran Dragić	Slovenia	
2008	53	Utah Jazz	Tadija Dragićević	Serbia	
2008	56	Seattle SuperSonics	Sasha Kaun	Russia	
2008	60	Boston Celtics	Semih Erden	Turkey	
2009	2	Memphis Grizzlies	Hasheem Thabeet	Tanzania	
2009	5	Minnesota Timberwolves	Ricky Rubio	Spain	
2009	22	Portland Trail Blazers	Víctor Claver	Spain	
2009	23	Sacramento Kings	Omri Casspi	Israel	
2009	24	Dallas Mavericks	Byron Mullens	Great Britain	
2009	25	Oklahoma City Thunder	Rodrigue Beaubois	France	
2009	30	Cleveland Cavaliers	Christian Eyenga	DR Congo	
2009	34	Denver Nuggets	Sergio Llull	Spain	
2009	39	Detroit Pistons	Jonas Jerebko	Sweden	
2009	45	Minnesota Timberwolves	Nick Calathes	Greece	
2009	47	Minnesota Timberwolves	Henk Norel	Netherlands	
2009	49	Atlanta Hawks	Sergiy Gladyr	Ukraine	
2009	50	Utah Jazz	Goran Suton	Bosnia and Herzegovina	
2009	53	San Antonio Spurs	Nando de Colo	France	
2009	55	Portland Trail Blazers	Patty Mills	Australia	
2009	57	Phoenix Suns	Emir Preldžić	Turkey	
2009	59	Los Angeles Lakers	Chinemelu Elonu	Nigeria	
2010	8	Los Angeles Clippers	Al-Farouq Aminu	Nigeria	
2010	17	Chicago Bulls	Kevin Séraphin	France	
2010	28	Memphis Grizzlies	Greivis Vásquez	Venezuela	
2010	31	New Jersey Nets	Tibor Pleiß	Germany	
2010	35	Washington Wizards	Nemanja Bjelica	Serbia	
2010	38	New York Knicks	Andy Rautins	Canada	
2010	44	Milwaukee Bucks	Jerome Jordan	Jamaica	
2010	45	Minnesota Timberwolves	Paulão Prestes	Brazil	
2010	46	Phoenix Suns	Gani Lawal	Nigeria	
2010	49	San Antonio Spurs	Ryan Richards	Great Britain	
2010	50	Dallas Mavericks	Solomon Alabi	Nigeria	
2010	51	Oklahoma City Thunder	Magnum Rolle	Bahamas	
2010	53	Atlanta Hawks	Pape Sy	France	
2010	56	Minnesota Timberwolves	Hamady N'Diaye	Senegal	
2011	3	Utah Jazz	Enes Kanter	Turkey	
2011	4	Cleveland Cavaliers	Tristan Thompson	Canada	
2011	5	Toronto Raptors	Jonas Valančiūnas	Lithuania	
2011	6	Washington Wizards	Jan Veselý	Czech Republic	
2011	7	Sacramento Kings	Bismack Biyombo	DR Congo	
2011	16	Philadelphia 76ers	Nikola Vučević	Montenegro	
2011	20	Minnesota Timberwolves	Donatas Motiejūnas	Lithuania	
2011	23	Houston Rockets	Nikola Mirotić	Spain	
2011	29	San Antonio Spurs	Cory Joseph	Canada	
2011	31	Miami Heat	Bojan Bogdanović	Croatia	
2011	42	Indiana Pacers	Dāvis Bertāns	Latvia	
2011	54	Cleveland Cavaliers	Milan Mačvan	Serbia	
2011	56	Los Angeles Lakers	Chukwudiebere Maduabum	Nigeria	
2011	57	Dallas Mavericks	Tanguy Ngombo	Qatar	
2011	58	Los Angeles Lakers	Ater Majok	Australia	
2011	59	San Antonio Spurs	Ádám Hanga	Hungary	
2012	15	Philadelphia 76ers	Maurice Harkless	Puerto Rico	
2012	19	Orlando Magic	Andrew Nicholson	Canada	
2012	20	Denver Nuggets	Evan Fournier	France	
2012	22	Boston Celtics	Fab Melo	Brazil	
2012	30	Golden State Warriors	Festus Ezeli	Nigeria	
2012	31	Charlotte Bobcats	Jeffery Taylor	Sweden	
2012	32	Washington Wizards	Tomáš Satoranský	Czech Republic	
2012	48	New York Knicks	Kostas Papanikolaou	Greece	
2012	50	Denver Nuggets	İzzet Türkyılmaz	Turkey	
2012	51	Boston Celtics	Kris Joseph	Canada	
2012	52	Golden State Warriors	Ognjen Kuzmić	Serbia	
2012	53	Los Angeles Clippers	Furkan Aldemir	Turkey	
2012	54	Philadelphia 76ers	Tornike Shengelia	Georgia	
2012	56	Toronto Raptors	Tomislav Zubčić	Croatia	
2012	57	Brooklyn Nets	İlkan Karaman	Turkey	
2012	60	Los Angeles Lakers	Robert Sacre	Canada	
2013	1	Cleveland Cavaliers	Anthony Bennett	Canada	
2013	5	Phoenix Suns	Alex Len	Ukraine	
2013	12	Oklahoma City Thunder	Steven Adams	New Zealand	
2013	13	Dallas Mavericks	Kelly Olynyk	Canada	
2013	15	Milwaukee Bucks	Giannis Antetokounmpo	Greece	
2013	16	Boston Celtics	Lucas Nogueira	Brazil	
2013	17	Atlanta Hawks	Dennis Schröder	Germany	
2013	19	Cleveland Cavaliers	Sergey Karasev	Russia	
2013	21	Utah Jazz	Gorgui Dieng	Senegal	
2013	27	Denver Nuggets	Rudy Gobert	France	
2013	28	San Antonio Spurs	Livio Jean-Charles	France	
2013	30	Phoenix Suns	Nemanja Nedović	Serbia	
2013	32	Oklahoma City Thunder	Álex Abrines	Spain	
2013	45	Portland Trail Blazers	Marko Todorović	Montenegro	
2013	47	Atlanta Hawks	Raul Neto	Brazil	
2013	49	Chicago Bulls	Erik Murphy	Finland	
2013	54	Washington Wizards	Arsalan Kazemi	Iran	
2013	55	Memphis Grizzlies	Joffrey Lauvergne	France	
2013	59	Minnesota Timberwolves	Bojan Dubljević	Montenegro	
2013	60	Memphis Grizzlies	Jānis Timma	Latvia	
2014	1	Minnesota Timberwolves	Andrew Wiggins	Canada	
2014	3	Philadelphia 76ers	Joel Embiid	Cameroon	
2014	5	Utah Jazz	Dante Exum	Australia	
2014	8	Sacramento Kings	Nik Stauskas	Canada	
2014	12	Orlando Magic	Dario Šarić	Croatia	
2014	16	Chicago Bulls	Jusuf Nurkić	Bosnia and Herzegovina	
2014	18	Phoenix Suns	Tyler Ennis	Canada	
2014	20	Toronto Raptors	Bruno Caboclo	Brazil	
2014	25	Houston Rockets	Clint Capela	Switzerland	
2014	27	Phoenix Suns	Bogdan Bogdanović	Serbia	
2014	30	San Antonio Spurs	Kyle Anderson	China	
2014	31	Milwaukee Bucks	Damien Inglis	France	
2014	41	Denver Nuggets	Nikola Jokić	Serbia	
2014	43	Atlanta Hawks	Walter Tavares	Cape Verde	
2014	45	Charlotte Hornets	Dwight Powell	Canada	
2014	46	Washington Wizards	Jordan Clarkson	Philippines	
2014	49	Chicago Bulls	Cameron Bairstow	Australia	
2014	51	New York Knicks	Thanasis Antetokounmpo	Greece	
2014	52	Philadelphia 76ers	Vasilije Micić	Serbia	
2014	53	Minnesota Timberwolves	Alessandro Gentile	Italy	
2014	54	Philadelphia 76ers	Nemanja Dangubić	Serbia	
2014	57	Indiana Pacers	Louis Labeyrie	France	
2015	1	Minnesota Timberwolves	Karl-Anthony Towns	Dominican Republic	
2015	4	New York Knicks	Kristaps Porziņģis	Latvia	
2015	5	Orlando Magic	Mario Hezonja	Croatia	
2015	7	Denver Nuggets	Emmanuel Mudiay	DR Congo	
2015	12	Utah Jazz	Trey Lyles	Canada	
2015	23	Portland Trail Blazers	Rondae Hollis-Jefferson	Jordan	
2015	26	San Antonio Spurs	Nikola Milutinov	Serbia	
2015	31	Minnesota Timberwolves	Cedi Osman	Turkey	
2015	35	Philadelphia 76ers	Willy Hernangómez	Spain	
2015	39	Charlotte Hornets	Juan Pablo Vaulet	Argentina	
2015	42	Utah Jazz	Olivier Hanlan	Canada	
2015	47	Philadelphia 76ers	Artūras Gudaitis	Lithuania	
2015	50	Atlanta Hawks	Marcus Eriksson	Sweden	
2015	52	Dallas Mavericks	Satnam Singh Bhamara	India	
2015	55	San Antonio Spurs	Cady Lalanne	Haiti	
2015	57	Denver Nuggets	Nikola Radičević	Serbia	
2015	59	Atlanta Hawks	Dimitrios Agravanis	Greece	
2015	60	Philadelphia 76ers	Luka Mitrović	Serbia	
2016	1	Philadelphia 76ers	Ben Simmons	Australia	
2016	4	Phoenix Suns	Dragan Bender	Croatia	
2016	6	New Orleans Pelicans	Buddy Hield	Bahamas	
2016	7	Denver Nuggets	Jamal Murray	Canada	
2016	9	Toronto Raptors	Jakob Pöltl	Austria	
2016	10	Milwaukee Bucks	Thon Maker	Australia	
2016	11	Orlando Thunder	Domantas Sabonis	Lithuania	
2016	13	Phoenix Suns	Georgios Papagiannis	Greece	
2016	15	Denver Nuggets	Juancho Hernangómez	Spain	
2016	16	Boston Celtics	Guerschon Yabusele	France	
2016	23	Boston Celtics	Ante Žižić	Croatia	
2016	24	Philadelphia 76ers	Timothé Luwawu-Cabarrot	France	
2016	26	Philadelphia 76ers	Furkan Korkmaz	Turkey	
2016	27	Toronto Raptors	Pascal Siakam	Cameroon	
2016	28	Phoenix Suns	Skal Labissière	Haiti	
2016	32	Los Angeles Lakers	Ivica Zubac	Croatia	
2016	33	Los Angeles Clippers	Cheick Diallo	Mali	
2016	35	Boston Celtics	Rade Zagorac	Serbia	
2016	39	New Orleans Pelicans	David Michineau	France	
2016	43	Houston Rockets	Zhou Qi	China	
2016	44	Atlanta Hawks	Isaïa Cordinier	France	
2016	48	Chicago Bulls	Paul Zipser	Germany	
2016	49	Detroit Pistons	Michael Gbinije	Nigeria	
2016	51	Boston Celtics	Ben Bentil	Ghana	
2016	52	Utah Jazz	Joel Bolomboy	Ukraine	
2016	53	Denver Nuggets	Petr Cornelie	France	
2016	57	Memphis Grizzlies	Wang Zhelin	China	
2016	58	Boston Celtics	Abdel Nader	Egypt	
2017	7	Minnesota Timberwolves	Lauri Markkanen	Finland	
2017	8	New York Knicks	Frank Ntilikina	France	
2017	18	Indiana Pacers	T. J. Leaf	Israel	
2017	25	Orlando Magic	Anžejs Pasečņiks	Latvia	
2017	36	Philadelphia 76ers	Jonah Bolden	Australia	
2017	41	Atlanta Hawks	Tyler Dorsey	Greece	
2017	43	Houston Rockets	Isaiah Hartenstein	Germany	
2017	45	Houston Rockets	Dillon Brooks	Canada	
2017	49	Denver Nuggets	Vlatko Čančar	Slovenia	
2017	50	Philadelphia 76ers	Mathias Lessort	France	
2017	57	Brooklyn Nets	Aleksandar Vezenkov	Bulgaria	
2017	58	New York Knicks	Ognjen Jaramaz	Serbia	
2017	60	Atlanta Hawks	Alpha Kaba	France	
2018	1	Phoenix Suns	Deandre Ayton	Bahamas	
2018	3	Atlanta Hawks	Luka Dončić	Slovenia	
2018	11	Charlotte Hornets	Shai Gilgeous-Alexander	Canada	
2018	20	Minnesota Timberwolves	Josh Okogie	Nigeria	
2018	25	Los Angeles Lakers	Moritz Wagner	Germany	
2018	29	Brooklyn Nets	Džanan Musa	Bosnia and Herzegovina	
2018	30	Atlanta Hawks	Omari Spellman	Lebanon	
2018	31	Phoenix Suns	Élie Okobo	France	
2018	39	Philadelphia 76ers	Isaac Bonga	Germany	
2018	40	Brooklyn Nets	Rodions Kurucs	Latvia	
2018	43	Denver Nuggets	Justin Jackson	Canada	
2018	44	Washington Wizards	Issuf Sanon	Ukraine	
2018	47	Los Angeles Lakers	Sviatoslav Mykhailiuk	Ukraine	
2018	55	Charlotte Hornets	Arnoldas Kulboka	Lithuania	
2018	60	Philadelphia 76ers	Kostas Antetokounmpo	Greece	
2019	3	New York Knicks	RJ Barrett	Canada	
2019	9	Washington Wizards	Rui Hachimura	Japan	
2019	15	Detroit Pistons	Sekou Doumbouya	France	
2019	17	Brooklyn Nets	Nickeil Alexander-Walker	Canada	
2019	18	Indiana Pacers	Goga Bitadze	Georgia	
2019	19	San Antonio Spurs	Luka Šamanić	Croatia	
2019	21	Oklahoma City Thunder	Brandon Clarke	Canada	
2019	27	Brooklyn Nets	Mfiondu Kabengele	Canada	
2019	34	Philadelphia 76ers	Bruno Fernando	Angola	
2019	35	Atlanta Hawks	Marcos Louzada Silva	Brazil	
2019	37	Dallas Mavericks	Deividas Sirvydis	Lithuania	
2019	39	New Orleans Pelicans	Alen Smailagić	Serbia	
2019	44	Miami Heat	Bol Bol	Sudan	
2019	47	Sacramento Kings	Ignas Brazdeikis	Lithuania	
2019	54	Philadelphia 76ers	Marial Shayok	Canada	
2019	60	Sacramento Kings	Vanja Marinković	Serbia	
2020	7	Detroit Pistons	Killian Hayes	France	
2020	9	Washington Wizards	Deni Avdija	Israel	
2020	17	Minnesota Timberwolves	Aleksej Pokuševski	Serbia	
2020	18	Dallas Mavericks	Josh Green	Australia	
2020	20	Miami Heat	Precious Achiuwa	Nigeria	
2020	23	New York Knicks	Leandro Bolmaro	Argentina	
2020	27	Utah Jazz	Udoka Azubuike	Nigeria	
2020	34	Philadelphia 76ers	Théo Maledon	France	
2020	37	Washington Wizards	Vít Krejčí	Czech Republic	
2020	42	New Orleans Pelicans	Nick Richards	Jamaica	
2020	44	Chicago Bulls	Marko Simonović	Montenegro	
2020	47	Boston Celtics	Yam Madar	Israel	
2020	48	Golden State Warriors	Nico Mannion	Italy	
2021	2	Houston Rockets	Jalen Green	Philippines	
2021	6	Oklahoma City Thunder	Josh Giddey	Australia	
2021	7	Golden State Warriors	Jonathan Kuminga	DR Congo	
2021	8	Orlando Magic	Franz Wagner	Germany	
2021	12	San Antonio Spurs	Joshua Primo	Canada	
2021	13	Indiana Pacers	Chris Duarte	Canada	
2021	16	Oklahoma City Thunder	Alperen Şengün	Turkey	
2021	19	New York Knicks	Kai Jones	Bahamas	
2021	23	Houston Rockets	Usman Garuba	Spain	
2021	30	Utah Jazz	Santi Aldama	Spain	
2021	34	Oklahoma City Thunder	Rokas Jokubaitis	Lithuania	
2021	39	Sacramento Kings	Neemias Queta	Portugal	
2021	45	Boston Celtics	Juhann Begarin	France	
2021	46	Toronto Raptors	Dalano Banton	Canada	
2021	51	Philadelphia 76ers	Filip Petrušev	Serbia	
2021	53	Philadelphia 76ers	Charles Bassey	Nigeria	
2021	54	Indiana Pacers	Sandro Mamukelashvili	Georgia	
2021	57	Charlotte Hornets	Balsa Koprivica	Serbia	
2021	60	Indiana Pacers	Georgios Kalaitzakis	Greece	
2022	6	Indiana Pacers	Bennedict Mathurin	Canada	
2022	7	Portland Trail Blazers	Shaedon Sharpe	Canada	
2022	8	New Orleans Pelicans	Dyson Daniels	Australia	
2022	9	San Antonio Spurs	Jeremy Sochan	Poland	
2022	11	New York Knicks	Ousmane Dieng	France	
2022	27	Miami Heat	Nikola Jović	Serbia	
2022	31	Indiana Pacers	Andrew Nembhard	Canada	
2022	32	Orlando Magic	Caleb Houstan	Canada	
2022	33	Toronto Raptors	Christian Koloko	Cameroon	
2022	36	Portland Trail Blazers	Gabriele Procida	Italy	
2022	39	Cleveland Cavaliers	Khalifa Diop	Senegal	
2022	43	Los Angeles Clippers	Moussa Diabaté	France	
2022	45	Charlotte Hornets	Josh Minott	Jamaica	
2022	46	Detroit Pistons	Ismaël Kamagate	France	
2022	50	Minnesota Timberwolves	Matteo Spagnolo	Italy	
2022	52	New Orleans Pelicans	Karlo Matković	Croatia	
2022	54	Washington Wizards	Yannick Nzosa	DR Congo	
2022	55	Golden State Warriors	Gui Santos	Brazil	
2022	56	Cleveland Cavaliers	Luke Travers	Australia	
2022	58	Indiana Pacers	Hugo Besson	France	
2023	1	San Antonio Spurs	Victor Wembanyama	France	
2023	7	Washington Wizards	Bilal Coulibaly	France	
2023	18	Miami Heat	Jaime Jaquez Jr.	Mexico	
2023	24	Dallas Mavericks	Olivier-Maxence Prosper	Canada	
2023	29	Denver Nuggets	Julian Strawther	Puerto Rico	
2023	31	Charlotte Hornets	James Nnaji	Nigeria	
2023	33	Minnesota Timberwolves	Leonard Miller	Canada	
2023	39	Atlanta Hawks	Mouhamed Gueye	Senegal	
2023	42	Washington Wizards	Tristan Vukčević	Serbia	
2023	43	Portland Trail Blazers	Rayan Rupert	France	
2023	44	San Antonio Spurs	Sidy Cissoko	France	
2023	47	Indiana Pacers	Mojave King	New Zealand	
2023	52	Phoenix Suns	Toumani Camara	Belgium	
2023	56	Memphis Grizzlies	Tarik Biberović	Turkey	
2024	1	Atlanta Hawks	Zaccharie Risacher	France	
2024	2	Washington Wizards	Alex Sarr	France	
2024	6	Charlotte Hornets	Tidjane Salaün	France	
2024	9	Memphis Grizzlies	Zach Edey	Canada	
2024	11	Chicago Bulls	Matas Buzelis	Lithuania	
2024	12	Oklahoma City Thunder	Nikola Topić	Serbia	
2024	18	Orlando Magic	Tristan da Silva	Germany	
2024	21	New Orleans Pelicans	Yves Missi	Cameroon	
2024	24	New York Knicks	Kyshawn George	Switzerland	
2024	25	New York Knicks	Pacôme Dadiet	France	
2024	35	San Antonio Spurs	Johnny Furphy	Australia	
2024	36	Indiana Pacers	Juan Núñez	Spain	
2024	37	Minnesota Timberwolves	Bobi Klintman	Sweden	
2024	38	Oklahoma City Thunder	Ajay Mitchell	Belgium	
2024	41	Philadelphia 76ers	Adem Bona	Turkey	
2024	43	Miami Heat	Nikola Đurišić	Serbia	
2024	44	Houston Rockets	Pelle Larsson	Sweden	
2024	51	Washington Wizards	Melvin Ajinça	France	
2024	52	Golden State Warriors	Quinten Post	Netherlands	
2024	57	Memphis Grizzlies	Ulrich Chomche	Cameroon	
2024	58	Dallas Mavericks	Ariel Hukporti	Germany	
2025	3	Philadelphia 76ers	V. J. Edgecombe	Bahamas	
2025	8	Brooklyn Nets	Egor Dëmin	Russia	
2025	10	Phoenix Suns	Khaman Maluach	South Sudan	
2025	12	Chicago Bulls	Noa Essengue	France	
2025	16	Portland Trail Blazers	Yang Hansen	China	
2025	17	Minnesota Timberwolves	Joan Beringer	France	
2025	19	Brooklyn Nets	Nolan Traoré	France	
2025	20	Miami Heat	Kasparas Jakučionis	Lithuania	
2025	21	Washington Wizards	Will Riley	Canada	
2025	26	Brooklyn Nets	Ben Saraf	Israel	
2025	27	Brooklyn Nets	Danny Wolf	Israel	
2025	28	Boston Celtics	Hugo González	Spain	
2025	30	Los Angeles Clippers	Yanic Konan Niederhäuser	Switzerland	
2025	32	Orlando Magic	Noah Penda	France	
2025	42	Sacramento Kings	Maxime Raynaud	France	
2025	45	Minnesota Timberwolves	Rocco Zikarsky	Australia	
2025	46	Boston Celtics	Amari Williams	United Kingdom	
2025	47	Milwaukee Bucks	Bogoljub Marković	Serbia	
2025	49	Cleveland Cavaliers	Tyrese Proctor	Australia	
2025	51	New York Knicks	Mohamed Diawara	France	
2025	52	Golden State Warriors	Alex Toohey	Australia	
2025	55	Chicago Bulls	Lachlan Olbrich	Australia	
2025	57	Boston Celtics	Max Shulga	Ukraine	
2025	58	Cleveland Cavaliers	Saliou Niang	Italy	
