= List of NBA drafted players from Serbia =

List of NBA drafted players

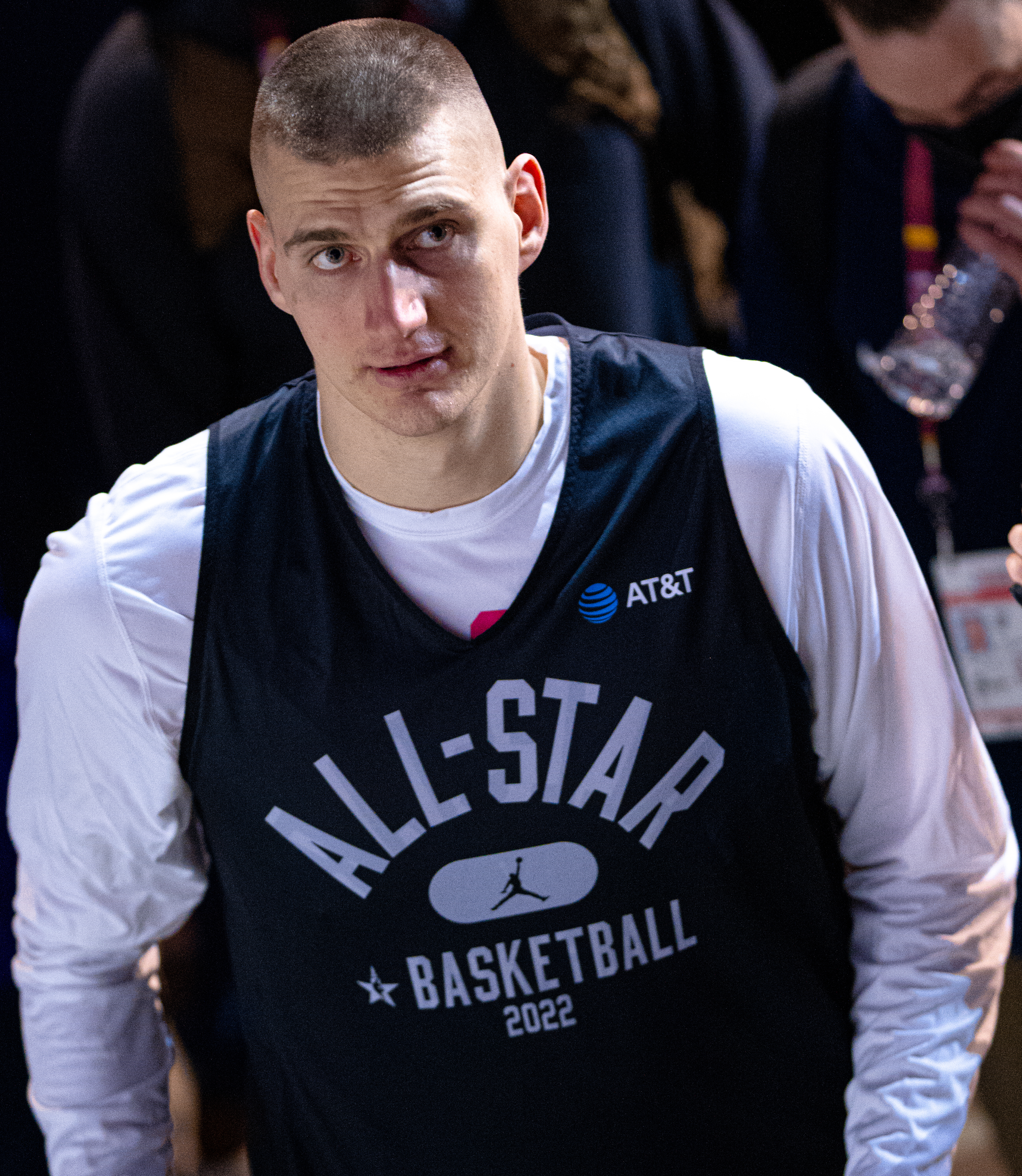
Center Nikola Jokić, who was drafted 41st overall in 2014 by the Denver Nuggets, is the only Serbian in league history to win an NBA Finals MVP (2023), as well as the first to win a regular season MVP award, having done so on three separate occasions

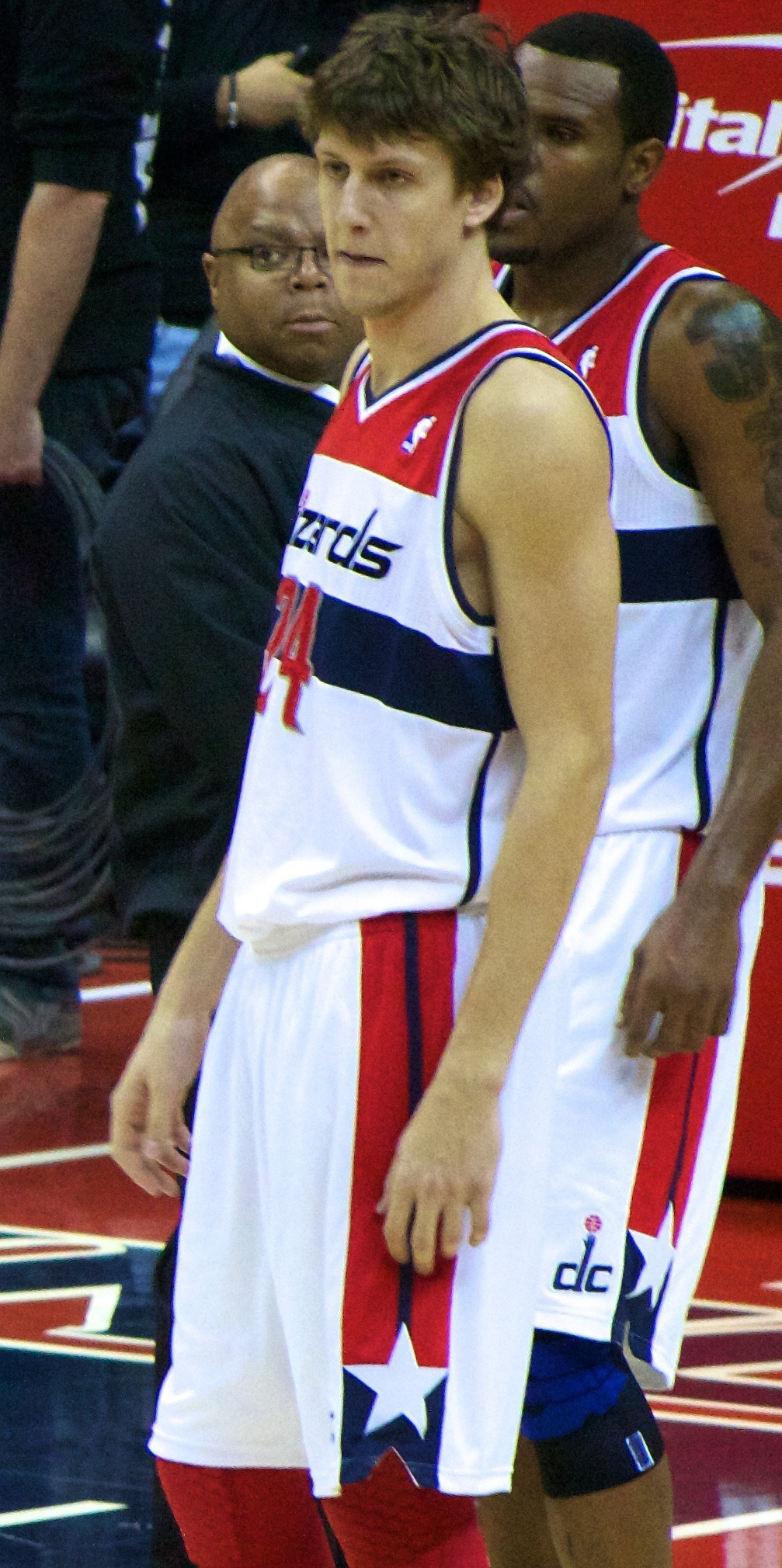
Czech forward Jan Veselý (#6) is the highest drafted non-Serbian player from a Serbia-based club.

The following is a list of men's basketball players that have played in a Serbia-based club before the NBA draft. The list has not included Serbian players selected in the draft while playing for a club based outside Serbia.

The National Basketball Association (NBA) holds an annual draft where teams select eligible players to join the league.

== Draft selections ==
G	Guard	PG	Point guard	SG	Shooting guard	F	Forward	SF	Small forward	PF	Power forward	C	Center

^	Denotes player who has been inducted to the Naismith Memorial Basketball Hall of Fame
*	Denotes player who has been selected for at least one All-Star Game and All-NBA Team
^{+}	Denotes player who has been selected for at least one All-Star Game
^{#}	Denotes player who has never appeared in an NBA regular-season or playoff game

Year	Round	Pick	Player	Pos.	Nationality (Note: Nationality indicates the player's national team or representative nationality on the draft day. If a player has not competed at the international level, then the nationality indicates the national team which the player is eligible to represent according to FIBA rules on the draft day.)	Team	Club team
1989	1	26	Vlade Divac^{^+}	C	Yugoslavia	Los Angeles Lakers	Partizan
1992	2	43	Predrag Danilović	SG	FR Yugoslavia	Golden State Warriors	Partizan
1994	2	54	Željko Rebrača	C	FR Yugoslavia	Seattle SuperSonics	Partizan
1997	2	48	Predrag Drobnjak	C	FR Yugoslavia	Washington Bullets (from Charlotte)	Partizan
2000	2	51	Igor Rakočević	G	FR Yugoslavia	Minnesota Timberwolves	Crvena zvezda
2001	1	12	Vladimir Radmanović	PF	FR Yugoslavia	Seattle SuperSonics	FMP Železnik
2002	1	24	Nenad Krstić	C/PF	FR Yugoslavia	New Jersey Nets	Partizan
2002	2	36	Miloš Vujanić^{#}	PG	FR Yugoslavia	New York Knicks	Partizan
2002	2	55	Mladen Šekularac^{#}	SG	FR Yugoslavia	Dallas Mavericks	FMP Železnik
2003	1	2	Darko Miličić	C	Serbia and Montenegro	Detroit Pistons (from Memphis) (Note: The Grizzlies traded this pick to the Pistons for Otis Thorpe on August 7, 1997.)	Vršac (Hemofarm)
2005	2	43	Mile Ilić	C	Serbia and Montenegro	New Jersey Nets	FMP Železnik (Reflex)
2006	2	38	Kosta Perović	C	Serbia	Golden State Warriors	Partizan
2007	2	60	Milovan Raković^{#}	C	Serbia	Dallas Mavericks (traded to Orlando)^{[i]}	Mega Basket (Mega Ishrana)
2008	2	31	Nikola Peković	C	Montenegro	Minnesota Timberwolves (from Miami via Boston)^{[s]}	Partizan
2008	2	53	Tadija Dragićević^{#}	PF	Serbia	Utah Jazz	Crvena zvezda
2010	2	35	Nemanja Bjelica	PF	Serbia	Washington Wizards (traded to Minnesota)^{[E]}	Crvena zvezda
2011	1	6	Jan Veselý	PF	Czech Republic	Washington Wizards	Partizan
2013	2	55	Joffrey Lauvergne	C	France	Memphis Grizzlies (traded to Denver) (Note: The Memphis Grizzlies traded Darrell Arthur and 55th pick Joffrey Lauvergne to the Nuggets for Kosta Koufos.)	Partizan
2014	1	27	Bogdan Bogdanović	SG	Serbia	Phoenix Suns (from Indiana) (Note: July 27, 2013: Indiana Pacers to Phoenix Suns: Phoenix acquired Miles Plumlee, Gerald Green and a conditional 2014 first-round pick (protected top 14 in 2014); Indiana acquired Luis Scola)	Partizan
2014	2	41	Nikola Jokić^{*+}	C	Serbia	Denver Nuggets	Mega Basket (Mega Vizura)
2014	2	52	Vasilije Micić	PG	Serbia	Philadelphia 76ers (from Memphis via Cleveland) (Note: July 25, 2012: Memphis Grizzlies to Cleveland Cavaliers: Cleveland acquired Jeremy Pargo, a 2014 second-round pick and cash considerations; Memphis acquired D. J. Kennedy) (Note: February 20, 2014: Cleveland Cavaliers to Philadelphia 76ers: Philadelphia acquired Earl Clark, Henry Sims and two 2014 second-round picks (Cleveland's and Memphis' pick); Cleveland acquired Spencer Hawes)	Mega Basket (Mega Vizura)
2014	2	54	Nemanja Dangubić^{#}	SG	Serbia	Philadelphia 76ers (from Houston via Milwaukee, (Note: June 27, 2012: Houston Rockets to Milwaukee Bucks: Milwaukee acquired Samuel Dalembert, 2012 and 2014 second-round picks; Houston acquired Jon Brockman, Jon Leuer, Shaun Livingston and the 12th pick in the 2012 NBA draft; June 27, 2013: Milwaukee Bucks to Philadelphia 76ers: Philadelphia acquired draft rights to Ricky Ledo and Houston's 2014 second-round pick; Milwaukee acquired draft rights to Nate Wolters) traded to San Antonio) (Note: San Antonio Spurs and Philadelphia 76ers trade: San Antonio acquired draft rights to 54th pick Nemanja Dangubić; Philadelphia acquired draft rights to 58th pick Jordan McRae and draft rights to 60th pick Cory Jefferson)	Mega Basket (Mega Vizura)
2015	1	26	Nikola Milutinov^{#}	C	Serbia	San Antonio Spurs	Partizan
2015	2	60	Luka Mitrović^{#}	PF	Serbia	Philadelphia 76ers (from Golden State via Indiana) (Note: December 19, 2011: Golden State Warriors to Indiana Pacers: Indiana acquired Louis Amundson and a second-round pick; Golden State acquired Brandon Rush; February 20, 2014: Indiana Pacers to Philadelphia 76ers: Philadelphia acquired Danny Granger and Golden State's 2015 second-round pick; Indiana acquired Evan Turner and Lavoy Allen)	Crvena zvezda
2016	1	24	Timothé Luwawu-Cabarrot	SG/SF	France	Philadelphia 76ers (from Miami via Cleveland) (Note: July 9, 2010: Miami Heat to Cleveland Cavaliers: Cleveland acquired a 2011 second round pick, a 2012 second round pick, a 2013 first round pick, and a future first round pick (top 10 protected in 2015–16); Miami acquired LeBron James; August 23, 2014: Cleveland Cavaliers to Philadelphia 76ers (three-team trade with Minnesota Timberwolves): Philadelphia acquired Luc Mbah a Moute, Alexey Shved, and Miami's conditional first round pick; Cleveland acquired Kevin Love; Minnesota acquired Andrew Wiggins, Anthony Bennett, and Thaddeus Young)	Mega Basket (Mega Leks)
2016	2	32	Ivica Zubac	C	Croatia (Note: The player was born in Bosnia and Herzegovina, but he represents Croatia in international competitions.)	Los Angeles Lakers	Mega Basket (Mega Leks)
2016	2	35	Rade Zagorac^{#}	SG/SF	Serbia	Boston Celtics (from Minnesota via New Orleans and Phoenix, (Note: July 13, 2012: Minnesota Timberwolves to New Orleans Hornets (now Pelicans): New Orleans acquired the rights to Brad Miller's expiring contract, the 2013 second round pick, and a 2016 second round pick; Minnesota acquired a Top 55 protected 2017 second round pick; July 27, 2012: New Orleans Hornets (now Pelicans) to Phoenix Suns (three-team trade with Minnesota): Phoenix acquired Wesley Johnson and a protected first round pick (Top-13 for 2013–2014, Top-12 for 2015–2016) that converts to two second round picks in 2016 and 2017 from Minnesota; Phoenix acquired the rights to Brad Miller's expiring contract and the expiring contract of Jerome Dyson from New Orleans; New Orleans acquired Robin Lopez, Hakim Warrick, and cash considerations from Phoenix; Minnesota reacquired the 2013 second round pick they got back from New Orleans in their earlier trade and acquired a 2016 second round pick from New Orleans; Minnesota acquired a 2014 second round pick from Phoenix (via the Los Angeles Lakers); January 9, 2015: Phoenix Suns to Boston Celtics: Boston acquired a Top 12 protected first round pick from 2015 and 2016 that converts to two second round picks in 2016 and 2017 from Phoenix via Minnesota; Phoenix acquired Brandan Wright) traded to Memphis Grizzlies (Note: June 23, 2016: Boston Celtics to Memphis Grizzlies: Memphis acquired draft rights to the No. 31st pick (Davis) and the No. 35th pick (Zagorac); Boston acquired a 2019 first round pick))	Mega Basket (Mega Leks)
2017	2	36	Jonah Bolden	PF	Australia	Philadelphia 76ers (from New York via Utah and Toronto) (Note: July 10, 2013: New York Knicks to Toronto Raptors: New York acquired Andrea Bargnani; Toronto acquired Marcus Camby, Steve Novak, Quentin Richardson, New York's 2014 second-round pick, New York's 2016 first-round pick, and New York's 2017 second-round pick; July 10, 2014: Toronto Raptors to Utah Jazz: Toronto acquired Diante Garrett; Utah acquired Steve Novak and New York's 2017 second-round pick) (Note: August 26, 2016: Utah Jazz to Philadelphia 76ers: Utah Jazz acquired Kendall Marshall; Philadelphia acquired Tibor Pleiß and best and worst of four 2017 second-round picks: Golden State's second round pick and New York's second-round pick)	FMP
2017	2	49	Vlatko Čančar	SF	Slovenia	Denver Nuggets (from Memphis via Oklahoma City) (Note: January 7, 2014: Boston Celtics to Oklahoma City Thunder: Boston acquired Jerryd Bayless (from Memphis) and Ryan Gomes (from Oklahoma City); Memphis acquired Courtney Lee (from Boston), a 2016 second-round pick (from Boston), and cash considerations (from Oklahoma City); Oklahoma City acquired Philadelphia's 2014 second-round pick and a 2017 conditional second-round pick, both from Memphis; August 30, 2016: Oklahoma City Thunder to Denver Nuggets: Oklahoma City acquired Joffrey Lauvergne; Denver acquired Memphis's 2017 second-round pick and Oklahoma City's 2017 second-round pick)	Mega Basket (Mega Leks)
2017	2	58	Ognjen Jaramaz^{#}	PG	Serbia	New York Knicks (from Houston) (Note: February 19, 2015: Houston Rockets to New York Knicks: New York acquired Alexey Shved, Houston's 2017 second-round pick, and Houston's 2019 second-round pick; Houston acquired Pablo Prigioni)	Mega Basket (Mega Leks)
2017	2	60	Alpha Kaba^{#}	PF/C	France (Note: The player was born in France, played for the youth categories of the French national team, but later decided to represent Guinea in international competitions.)	Atlanta Hawks (from Golden State via Philadelphia and Utah) (Note: July 10, 2013: Golden State Warriors to Utah Jazz (three-team trade with Denver Nuggets): Golden State acquired Andre Iguodala and Kevin Murphy; Denver acquired Randy Foye and Golden State's 2018 second-round pick; Utah acquired Andris Biedriņš, Richard Jefferson, Brandon Rush, cash considerations, Denver's 2018 second-round pick, and Golden State's 2014 first-round pick, 2016 second-round pick, 2017 first-round pick, and 2017 second-round pick) (Note: February 23, 2017: Atlanta Hawks to Philadelphia 76ers: Atlanta acquired Ersan İlyasova; Philadelphia acquired Tiago Splitter, Miami's protected 2017 second-round draft pick, and the right to swap Atlanta's 2017 second-round pick for the worse of the two picks Philadelphia acquired from Utah) traded to Milwaukee Bucks) (Note: June 22, 2017: Philadelphia 76ers to Milwaukee Bucks: Milwaukee acquired Philadelphia' second-round pick (No. 46); Philadelphia received cash considerations)	Mega Basket (Mega Leks)
2019	1	18	Goga Bitadze	C	Georgia	Indiana Pacers	Mega Basket (Mega Bemax)
2019	2	60	Vanja Marinković^{#}	SG	Serbia	Sacramento Kings (from Milwaukee) (Note: July 12, 2013: Sacramento Kings to Milwaukee Bucks: Milwaukee acquired a 2016 second-round pick and the right to swap 2019 second-round picks between Sacramento and Milwaukee; Sacramento acquired Luc Mbah a Moute)	Partizan
2020	2	44	Marko Simonović	C	Montenegro	Chicago Bulls (from Memphis) (Note: January 3, 2019: Memphis Grizzlies to Chicago Bulls: Chicago acquired Wayne Selden Jr., MarShon Brooks, 2019 and 2020 second-round picks; Memphis acquired Justin Holiday)	Mega Basket (Mega Soccerbet)
2021	2	50	Filip Petrušev	C	Serbia	Philadelphia 76ers (from New York) (Note: June 26, 2015: New York Knicks to Philadelphia 76ers: Philadelphia acquired a 2020 second-round pick, a 2021 second-round pick, and cash considerations; New York acquired the draft rights to Willy Hernangómez)	Mega Basket (Mega Soccerbet)
2022	1	27	Nikola Jović	G/F	Serbia	Miami Heat	Mega Basket (Mega Mozzart)
2022	2	52	Karlo Matković	C	Croatia	New Orleans Pelicans (from Utah) (Note: November 18, 2020: Utah Jazz to New Orleans Pelicans: New Orleans acquired cash considerations and a 2022 second-round pick; Utah acquired the draft rights to Elijah Hughes)	Mega Basket (Mega Mozzart)
2023	2	42	Tristan Vukčević	PF/C	Serbia	Washington Wizards (from Chicago via LA Lakers and Washington) (Note: February 6, 2019: Chicago Bulls to Washington Wizards: Washington acquired Bobby Portis, Jabari Parker, and a protected 2023 second-round pick; Chicago acquired Otto Porter Jr.; July 1, 2019: Chicago Bulls to Washington Wizards: Washington acquired removal of protections on Chicago's 2023 second-round pick and additional future draft compensation; Chicago acquired Tomas Satoransky; August 6, 2021: Washington Wizards to Los Angeles Lakers (five-team trade with Indiana, San Antonio, and Brooklyn): LA Lakers acquired Russell Westbrook and 2023, 2024, and 2028 second-round picks; Washington acquired Spencer Dinwiddie, Aaron Holiday, Kentavious Caldwell-Pope, Kyle Kuzma, Montrezl Harrell, the draft rights to forward Isaiah Todd, and cash considerations from Indiana; San Antonio acquired a 2022 second-round draft pick and Chandler Hutchison; Indiana acquired the draft rights to Isaiah Jackson; Brooklyn acquired the draft rights to Nikola Milutinov, a 2024 second-round pick, and the option to swap a 2025 second-round pick with Washington; January 23, 2023: Los Angeles Lakers to Washington Wizards: Washington acquired Kendrick Nunn and three future second-round picks; LA Lakers acquired Rui Hachimura)	Partizan
2024	1	12	Nikola Topić	PG	Serbia	Oklahoma City Thunder (from Houston) (Note: July 16, 2019: Houston Rockets to Oklahoma City Thunder: Oklahoma City acquired Chris Paul, 2024 and 2026 first-round picks, and right to swap 2021 and 2025 first-round selections; Houston acquired Russell Westbrook)	Crvena zvezda
2024	2	43	Nikola Đurišić^{#}	SG/SF	Serbia	Miami Heat (traded to Atlanta) (Note: June 28, 2024: Miami Heat to Atlanta Hawks (three-team trade with Houston): Atlanta acquired the draft rights to Nikola Đurišić; Miami acquired the draft rights to Pelle Larsson and cash considerations; Houston acquired AJ Griffin)	Mega Basket
2025	2	47	Bogoljub Marković	PF	Serbia	Milwaukee Bucks (from Detroit via Washington) (Note: January 14, 2024: Detroit Pistons to Washington Wizards: Detroit acquired Danilo Gallinari and Mike Muscala; Washington acquired Marvin Bagley III, Isaiah Livers, 2025 second-round pick, and 2026 second-round pick; February 6, 2025: Washington Wizards to Milwaukee Bucks (four-team trade with New York and San Antonio): Washington acquired AJ Johnson, Khris Middleton, Draft rights to Mathias Lessort (2017 No. 50), 2028 right to swap first-round picks, and Cash considerations; Milwaukee acquired Kyle Kuzma, Jericho Sims, 2025 second-round pick, and 2026 SAS protected second-round pick; New York acquired Delon Wright, Draft rights to Hugo Besson (2022 No. 58), and Cash considerations; San Antonio acquired Patrick Baldwin Jr. and Cash considerations)	Mega Basket

== Statistics ==
As of 2026 NBA draft.

Note: Italics indicates countries and clubs that no longer exist.

Draft selections by club

Number	Clubs	Based in	First	Last	Highest
17	Mega Basket	Belgrade	2007	2025	18
14	Partizan	Belgrade	1989	2023	6
5	Crvena zvezda	Belgrade	2000	2024	12
3	FMP Železnik	Belgrade	2001	2005	12
1	FMP	Belgrade	2017		36
1	Vršac	Vršac	2003		2

Draft selections by country

19	Serbia

10	FR Yugoslavia / Serbia and Montenegro

3	France

2	Montenegro, Croatia

1	Australia, Czech Republic, Georgia, Slovenia, Yugoslavia

== See also ==
- List of Serbian NBA players
- List of Serbian WNBA players
- List of foreign NBA drafted players

== Notes ==
Details

Trades involving draft picks and rights
