= Lauvergne =

Lauvergne may refer to:

== Surname ==
- Barthélemy Lauvergne (1805-1871), French navigator and painter
- Joffrey Lauvergne (born 1991), French basketball player
- Stéphane Lauvergne (born 1968), French basketball player
