= San Antonio Spurs draft history =

The San Antonio Spurs started playing in the NBA in 1976. They started drafting NBA players for first time in the 1977 NBA draft. In total, they have had 157 NBA draft picks.

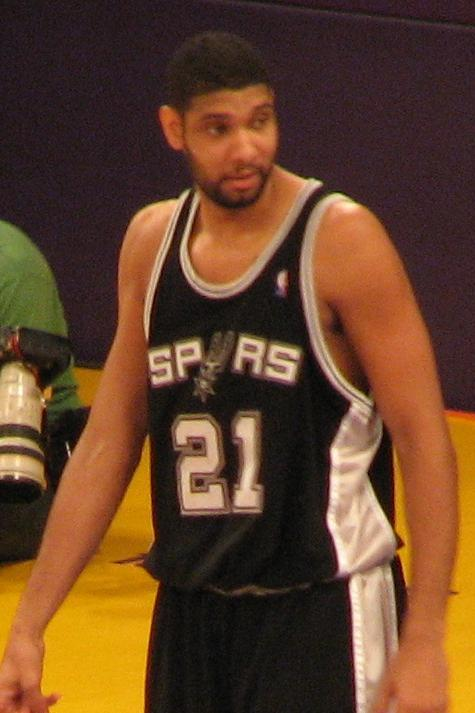
Tim Duncan, the first pick in the 1997 NBA draft, won all five championships with the Spurs (1999, 2003, 2005, 2007, 2014).

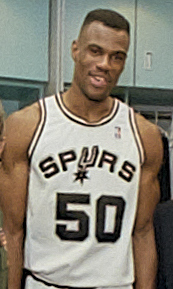
Hall of Famer David Robinson, the first pick in the 1987 NBA draft, won two NBA Championships with the Spurs (1999 and 2003). He was also the NBA MVP of the 1994-95 NBA season and a member of the "Dream Team", described by journalists as the greatest basketball team of all time.

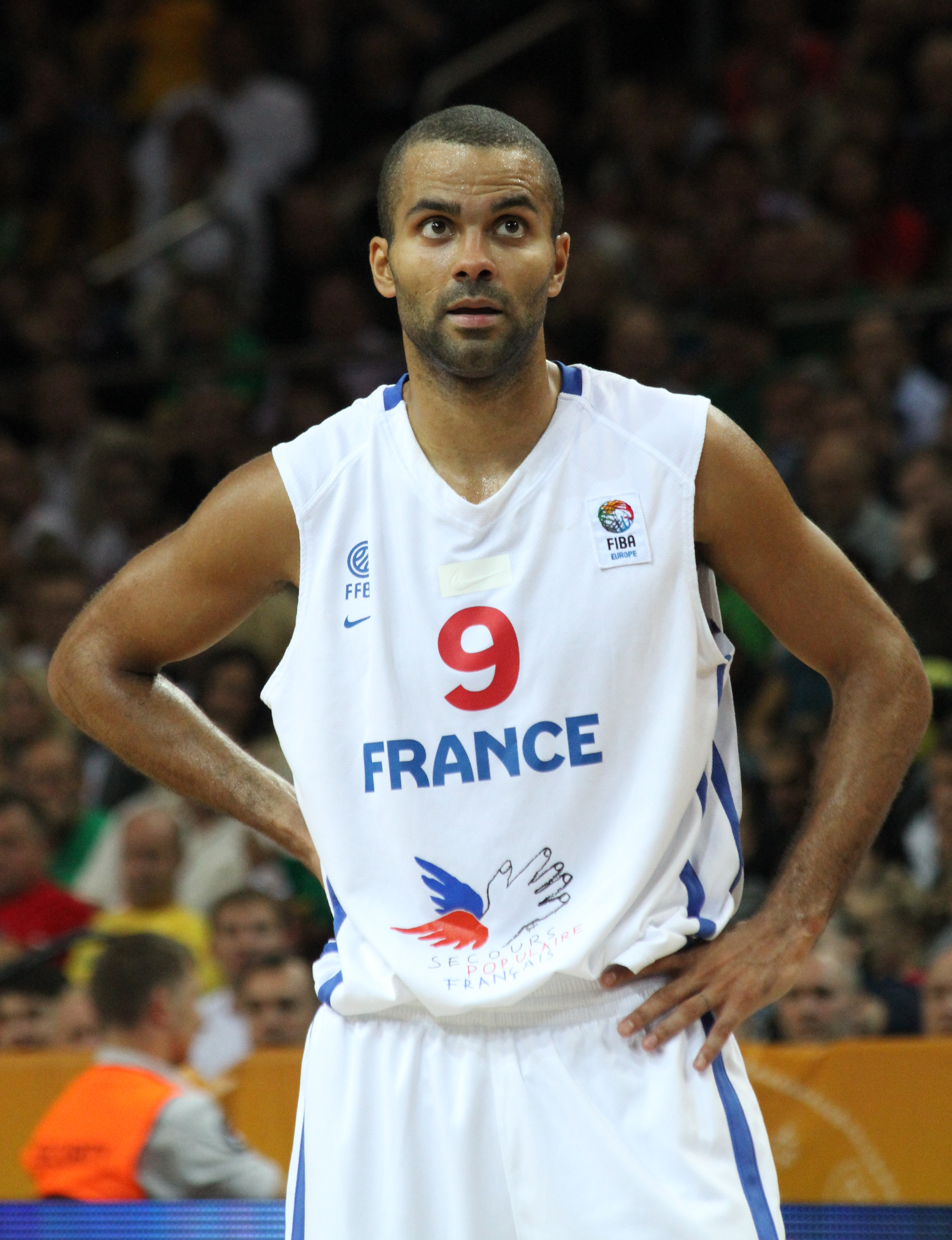
Tony Parker, the 28th pick in the 2001 draft, was the Finals MVP for the 2007 NBA Finals.

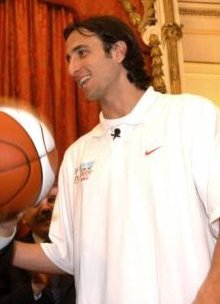
Manu Ginóbili, the 57th pick in the 1999 draft, won an Olympic gold medal at the 2004 Summer Olympics while playing for Argentina.

== Key ==
Naismith Basketball Hall of Famer	First overall NBA draft pick	Selected for an NBA All-Star Game

== NBA Draft picks ==
Draft year	League	Round	Pick	Player	College/High School/Club
2025	NBA	1	2	Dylan Harper	Rutgers
2025	NBA	1	14	Carter Bryant	Arizona
2024	NBA	1	4	Stephon Castle	UConn
2024	NBA	2	36	Juan Núñez	Ratiopharm Ulm
2024	NBA	2	48	Harrison Ingram	North Carolina
2023	NBA	1	1	Victor Wembanyama	Metropolitans 92 (France)
2023	NBA	2	44	Sidy Cissoko	G League Ignite
2022	NBA	1	9	Jeremy Sochan	Baylor
2022	NBA	1	20	Malaki Branham	Ohio State
2022	NBA	1	25	Blake Wesley	Notre Dame
2022	NBA	2	38	Kennedy Chandler	Tennessee
2021	NBA	1	12	Joshua Primo	Alabama
2021	NBA	2	41	Joe Wieskamp	Iowa
2020	NBA	1	11	Devin Vassell	Florida State
2020	NBA	2	41	Tre Jones	Duke
2019	NBA	1	19	Luka Šamanić	Olimpija Ljubljana
2019	NBA	1	29	Keldon Johnson	Kentucky
2019	NBA	2	49	Quinndary Weatherspoon	Mississippi State
2018	NBA	1	18	Lonnie Walker	University of Miami
2018	NBA	2	49	Chimezie Metu	University of Southern California
2017	NBA	1	29	Derrick White	University of Colorado
2017	NBA	2	59	Jaron Blossomgame	Clemson University
2016	NBA	1	29	Dejounte Murray	University of Washington
2015	NBA	1	26	Nikola Milutinov	Partizan Belgrade (Serbia)
2015	NBA	2	55	Cady Lalanne	University of Massachusetts Amherst
2014	NBA	1	30	Kyle Anderson	University of California, Los Angeles
2014	NBA	2	58	Jordan McRae	University of Tennessee
2014	NBA	2	60	Cory Jefferson	Baylor
2013	NBA	1	28	Livio Jean-Charles	ASVEL Basket (France)
2013	NBA	2	58	Deshaun Thomas	Ohio State University
2012	NBA	2	59	Marcus Denmon	University of Missouri
2011	NBA	1	29	Cory Joseph	University of Texas at Austin
2011	NBA	2	59	Adam Hanga	Alba Fehérvár (Hungary)
2010	NBA	1	20	James Anderson	Oklahoma State University
2010	NBA	2	49	Ryan Richards	CB Gran Canaria (Spain)
2009	NBA	2	37	DeJuan Blair	University of Pittsburgh
2009	NBA	2	51	Jack McClinton	University of Miami
2009	NBA	2	53	Nando de Colo	Cholet Basket (France)
2008	NBA	1	26	George Hill	Indiana University-Purdue University Indianapolis
2008	NBA	2	45	Goran Dragic	KK Union Olimpija (Slovenia)
2008	NBA	2	57	James Gist	University of Maryland
2007	NBA	1	28	Tiago Splitter	Saski Baskonia (Spain)
2007	NBA	2	33	Marcus Williams	University of Arizona
2007	NBA	2	58	Giorgos Printezis	Olympiacos BC (Greece)
2006	NBA	2	59	Damir Markota	KK Cibona (Croatia)
2005	NBA	1	28	Ian Mahinmi	STB Le Havre (France)
2004	NBA	1	28	Beno Udrih	Olimpia Milano (Italy)
2004	NBA	2	52	Romain Sato	Xavier University
2004	NBA	2	57	Sergei Karaulov	Sakha Yakutia Yakutsk (Russia)
2003	NBA	1	28	Leandro Barbosa	Associação Bauru (Brazil)
2002	NBA	1	26	John Salmons	University of Miami
2002	NBA	2	55	Luis Scola	Saski Baskonia (Spain)
2002	NBA	2	56	Randy Holcomb	San Diego State University
2001	NBA	1	28	Tony Parker	Paris Basket Racing (France)
2001	NBA	2	55	Robertas Javtokas	BC Lietuvos rytas (Lithuania)
2001	NBA	2	57	Bryan Bracey	University of Oregon
2000	NBA	2	41	Chris Carrawell	Duke University
2000	NBA	2	54	Cory Hightower	Indian Hills Community College
1999	NBA	2	57	Manu Ginobili	Viola Reggio Calabria (Italy)
1998	NBA	1	24	Felipe Lopez	St. John's University
1998	NBA	2	52	Derrick Dial	Eastern Michigan University
1997	NBA	1	1	Tim Duncan	Wake Forest University
1995	NBA	1	29	Cory Alexander	University of Virginia
1994	NBA	1	22	Bill Curley	Boston College
1993	NBA	2	47	Chris Whitney	Clemson University
1992	NBA	1	18	Tracy Murray	University of California, Los Angeles
1992	NBA	2	44	Henry Williams	University of North Carolina at Charlotte
1991	NBA	2	49	Greg Sutton	Oral Roberts University
1990	NBA	1	24	Dwayne Schintzius	University of Florida
1990	NBA	2	43	Tony Massenburg	University of Maryland
1990	NBA	2	54	Sean Higgins	University of Michigan
1989	NBA	1	3	Sean Elliott	University of Arizona
1988	NBA	1	10	Willie Anderson	University of Georgia
1988	NBA	2	27	Shelton Jones	St. John's University
1988	NBA	3	56	Barry Sumpter	Austin Peay State University
1988	NBA	3	75	Archie Marshall	University of Kansas
1987	NBA	1	1	David Robinson	United States Naval Academy
1987	NBA	1	23	Greg Anderson	University of Houston
1987	NBA	2	27	Nate Blackwell	Temple University
1987	NBA	3	50	Phil Zevenbergen	University of Washington
1987	NBA	4	73	Todd May	Pikeville College
1987	NBA	5	96	Dennis Williams	
1987	NBA	6	119	Ricky Brown	University of South Alabama
1987	NBA	7	142	Raynard Davis	University of Texas at Austin
1986	NBA	1	10	Johnny Dawkins	Duke University
1986	NBA	2	33	Kevin Duckworth	Eastern Illinois University
1986	NBA	3	48	Forrest McKenzie	Loyola Marymount University
1986	NBA	4	79	Carlos Briggs	Baylor University
1986	NBA	5	102	Earl Kelley	University of Connecticut
1986	NBA	6	125	Kevin Lewis	Southern Methodist University
1986	NBA	7	148	Michael Anderson	University of Texas-Pan American
1985	NBA	1	14	Alfredrick Hughes	Loyola University of Chicago
1985	NBA	2	29	Mike Brittain	University of South Carolina
1985	NBA	2	35	Tyrone Corbin	DePaul University
1985	NBA	4	82	Scott Roth	University of Wisconsin
1985	NBA	5	106	Clayton Olivier	University of Southern California
1985	NBA	6	128	Chris Harper	University of Oregon
1985	NBA	7	152	Al Young	Virginia Polytechnic Institute and State University
1984	NBA	1	7	Alvin Robertson	University of Arkansas
1984	NBA	3	57	Joe Binion	North Carolina Agricultural and Technical State University
1984	NBA	4	78	John Devereaux	Ohio University
1984	NBA	4	90	Ozell Jones	California State University, Fullerton
1984	NBA	5	100	Eric Richardson	University of Alabama
1984	NBA	6	124	Dion Brown	University of Louisiana at Lafayette
1984	NBA	7	146	Michael Pitts	University of California
1984	NBA	8	170	Danny Tarkanian	University of Nevada, Las Vegas
1984	NBA	9	191	Melvin Roseboro	St. Mary's University
1984	NBA	10	214	Frank Rodriguez	New Mexico State University
1983	NBA	1	19	John Paxson	University of Notre Dame
1983	NBA	2	35	Darrell Lockhart	Auburn University
1983	NBA	2	46	Kevin Williams	St. John's University
1983	NBA	4	90	Brant Weidner	College of William & Mary
1983	NBA	5	112	Jeff Pehl	University of Richmond
1983	NBA	6	136	Ricky Hooker	St. Mary's University
1983	NBA	7	158	Keith Williams	Oklahoma Panhandle State University
1983	NBA	8	182	Norville Brown	Oklahoma Christian University
1983	NBA	9	203	Gary Gaspard	St. Mary's University
1983	NBA	10	225	Lamar Heard	University of Georgia
1982	NBA	2	24	Oliver Robinson	University of Alabama at Birmingham
1982	NBA	3	64	Willie Redden	University of South Florida
1982	NBA	4	87	Tony Grier	University of South Florida
1982	NBA	5	110	Clarence Swannegan	Texas Tech University
1982	NBA	6	133	Jaime Peña	New Mexico State University
1982	NBA	7	156	Delonte Taylor	North Texas State University
1982	NBA	8	179	Chris Faggi	University of Memphis
1982	NBA	9	201	Harry O'Brien	St. Mary's University
1982	NBA	10	222	Keith White	McMurry University
1981	NBA	2	28	Gene Banks	Duke University
1981	NBA	2	30	Ed Rains	University of South Alabama
1981	NBA	3	64	Tom Baker	Eastern Kentucky University
1981	NBA	4	87	Earl Belcher	St. Bonaventure University
1981	NBA	5	110	Mike Rhodes	Vanderbilt University
1981	NBA	6	133	Norman Shavers	Jackson State University
1981	NBA	7	156	Mark Minderman	Northern Michigan University
1981	NBA	8	178	Bob Bartholomew	University of San Diego
1981	NBA	9	199	Leonel Marquetti	Hampton University
1981	NBA	10	219	Alvin Brooks	Lamar University
1980	NBA	1	15	Reggie Johnson	University of Tennessee
1980	NBA	2	39	Michael Wiley	California State University, Long Beach
1980	NBA	3	60	LaVon Mercer	University of Georgia
1980	NBA	3	61	Rich Yonakor	University of North Carolina
1980	NBA	4	83	Calvin Roberts	California State University, Fullerton
1980	NBA	5	107	Gib Hinz	University of Wisconsin-Eau Claire
1980	NBA	6	129	Dean Uthoff	Iowa State University
1980	NBA	7	153	Allan Zahn	University of Arkansas
1980	NBA	8	172	Bill Bailey	University of Texas-Pan American
1980	NBA	9	192	Al Williams	North Texas State University
1980	NBA	10	209	Steve Schall	University of Arkansas
1979	NBA	1	19	Wiley Peck	Mississippi State University
1979	NBA	3	63	Sylvester Norris	Jackson State University
1979	NBA	4	84	Al Daniel	Furman University
1979	NBA	5	106	Steve Schall	University of Arkansas
1979	NBA	6	125	Terry Knight	University of Pittsburgh
1979	NBA	7	146	Tyrone Branyan	University of Texas at Austin
1979	NBA	9	182	Eddie McLeod	University of Nevada, Las Vegas
1979	NBA	10	199	Glen Fine	Harvard University
1978	NBA	1	20	Frankie Sanders	Southern University and A&M College
1978	NBA	3	64	Gerald Henderson	Virginia Commonwealth University
1978	NBA	4	86	Rich Adams	University of Illinois at Urbana-Champaign
1978	NBA	5	108	Eugene Parker	Purdue University
1978	NBA	6	129	Harry Morgan	Indiana State University
1978	NBA	7	150	Hector Olivencia	Sacred Heart University
1978	NBA	8	168	Henry Taylor	University of Texas-Pan American
1978	NBA	9	185	Rick Taylor	Arizona State University
1978	NBA	10	200	Larry Brewster	University of Florida
1977	NBA	2	37	Jeff Wilkins	Illinois State University
1977	NBA	3	59	Dan Henderson	Arkansas State University
1977	NBA	4	81	Matt Hicks	Northern Illinois University
1977	NBA	5	103	Scott Sims	University of Missouri
1977	NBA	6	125	Bruce Buckley	University of North Carolina
1977	NBA	7	145	Richard Robinson	New Mexico State University
1977	NBA	8	164	Jerome Gladney	University of Arizona
