= Nikola Milutinov =

Serbian basketball player (born 1994)

Nikola Milutinov Никола Милутинов
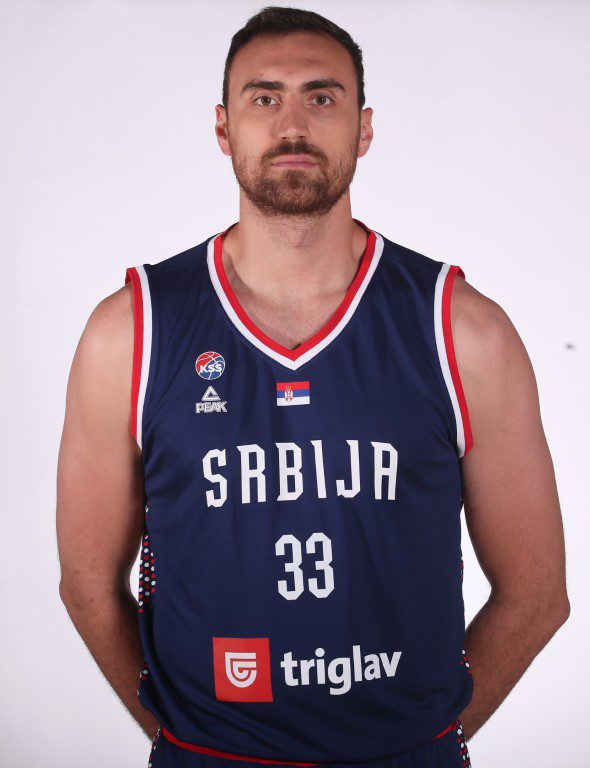
- Milutinov with Serbian national team in 2024

No. 33 – Olympiacos
- Position: Center
- League: GBL; EuroLeague

Personal information
- Born: 30 December 1994 (age 31) Novi Sad, Serbia, FR Yugoslavia
- Listed height: 2.13 m (7 ft 0 in)
- Listed weight: 116 kg (256 lb)

Career information
- NBA draft: 2015: 1st round, 26th overall pick
- Drafted by: San Antonio Spurs
- Playing career: 2011–present

Career history
- 2011–2012: Hemofarm
- 2012–2015: Partizan
- 2015–2020: Olympiacos
- 2020–2023: CSKA Moscow
- 2023–present: Olympiacos

Career highlights
- EuroLeague champion (2026); All-EuroLeague First Team (2026); 2× EuroLeague rebounding leader (2020, 2026); 3× Greek League champion (2016, 2025, 2026); Greek Cup winner (2024); 4× Greek Super Cup winner (2023–2026); 4× All-Greek League Team (2018, 2019, 2025, 2026); Greek League Most Improved Player (2017); VTB United League champion (2021); VTB United League Supercup winner (2021); VTB United League MVP (2023); 2× All-VTB United League First Team (2022, 2023); 2× VTB United League rebounding leader (2022, 2023); ABA League champion (2013); 2× Serbian League champion (2013, 2014); All-Serbian League Second Team (2015)
- Stats at Basketball Reference
Medals
Men's basketball
Representing Serbia
Olympic Games
Bronze medal – third place	2024 Paris	Team
FIBA World Cup
Silver medal – second place	2023 Philippines–Japan–Indonesia
FIBA Under-19 World Cup
Silver medal – second place	2013 Czech Republic	Team

Nikola Milutinov (Serbian Cyrillic: Никола Милутинов; born 30 December 1994) is a Serbian professional basketball player for Olympiacos of the Greek Basketball League (GBL) and the EuroLeague. He also represents the Serbian national team in international competition. Standing at 2.13 m (7 ft 0 in), Milutinov plays at the center position.

Milutinov was selected in the first round of the 2015 NBA Draft with the 26th overall pick by the San Antonio Spurs.

== Professional career ==
=== Hemofarm ===
Milutinov made his professional debut with the Serbian club Hemofarm, in the 2011–12 season.

=== Partizan (2012–2015) ===
In June 2012, Milutinov signed a four-year contract with Partizan of the Adriatic League. In his first season with Partizan, he won the Adriatic League 2012–13 season championship, and the Serbian League 2012–13 season championship. In his second season, he won the Serbian League championship for the second time in a row, after his team defeated Crvena zvezda, with a 3–1 win in the league's finals series.

In the 2014–15 season, following the departure of Partizan starters Dejan Musli and Joffrey Lauvergne, Milutinov's role in the team increased. In a 15 November game against Levski Sofia, he posted a season-high 21 points, and also added 10 rebounds. For that performance, he was selected to the Adriatic League 2014–15 season's ideal five of Round 8 of the competition. On 14 April, in Game 1 of the Adriatic League semifinal series against Crvena zvezda, he hurt the cornea in his right eye, after a collision with Jaka Blažič. He returned to action in the following game, although without the recommendation of the team's medical staff. Eventually, Crvena zvezda won the Adriatic League's finals series over Milutinov's team, Partizan, with a 3–1 series score. Over 28 games played in the Adriatic League that season, Milutinov averaged 9.8 points and 7.6 rebounds per game.

=== Olympiacos (2015–2020) ===
On 25 July 2015, Milutinov signed a three-year deal with the Greek League club Olympiacos. With Olympiacos, he won the Greek League 2015–16 season championship. He was named the Greek League Most Improved Player in 2017. Milutinov also reached the Euroleague final with Olympiakos in the same year.

In October 2017, he extended his contract with Olympiacos for three more seasons. In the 2017–18 season, Olympiacos was eliminated in the playoff series to Žalgiris Kaunas with 3–1. Milutinov had his best season since coming into the club, and averaged career-highs of 8.8 points and 5.7 rebounds over 29 EuroLeague games.

In 2018–19 season, Milutinov appeared in 28 games of the EuroLeague and averaged new career-highs of 11.7 points and league's second-highest 7.9 rebounds, while shooting 66.3% from the field. In the Greek League, he averaged 10.9 points and 7 rebounds over 24 games.

=== CSKA Moscow (2020–2023) ===
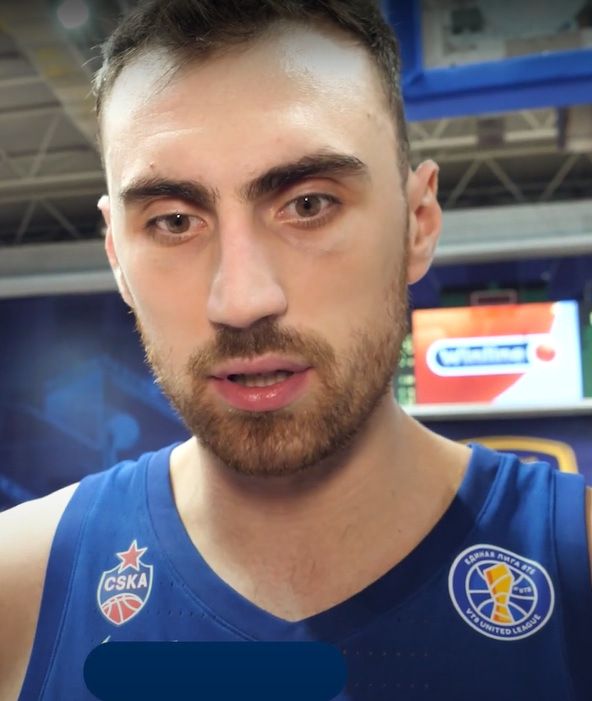
Milutinov with CSKA Moscow in 2020

On 2 June 2020, Milutinov signed a three-year contract with Russian club CSKA Moscow. On 30 December 2020, Milutinov set the EuroLeague record for most offensive rebounds in a game – he had 16 offensive rebounds in a 91–87 win over Olimpia Milano, finishing the game with 17 points and career-high 19 total rebounds. On 30 May 2023, Milutinov and CSKA officially parted ways after the expiration of their contract.

=== Return to Olympiacos (2023–present) ===
On 24 June 2023, Milutinov made his return to Olympiacos after three seasons, signing a lucrative two-year contract worth 3.6 million euros.

On 11 June 2025, Milutinov opted to renew his contract with Olympiacos, signing an improved three-year deal, worth 7.5 million euros, despite having previously reached a verbal agreement with Olimpia Milano and in lieu of a three-year, 9 million euros offer sheet from local arch–rivals Panathinaikos. The deal was made official on the afternoon of the same day.

=== NBA draft rights ===
On 16 April 2015, Milutinov declared himself eligible for the 2015 NBA draft. On 25 June 2015, Milutinov was selected with the 26th overall pick of the first round of the draft, by the San Antonio Spurs. On 6 August 2021, the Spurs sent his draft rights to the Brooklyn Nets as part of a multi-team trade.

== National team career ==
=== Junior team ===
Milutinov played for the Serbian under-19 national team, at the 2013 FIBA Under-19 World Cup, in Prague, on a roster alongside Vasilije Micić, Mihajlo Andrić, Jovan Novak, Nikola Jokić, and Nikola Janković. He won the silver medal at the tournament, after losing 68–82 to the U.S. under-19 team, which featured Aaron Gordon, Justise Winslow, Elfrid Payton, Marcus Smart, and Jahlil Okafor. Milutinov averaged 10.7 points and 5.9 rebounds per game at the tournament.

=== Senior team ===
Milutinov represented the senior men's Serbian national basketball team for the first time, at the EuroBasket 2015, under the team's head coach Aleksandar Đorđević. In the first phase of the tournament, Serbia dominated in the toughest group of the tournament, Group B, with a 5–0 record, and they then eliminated Finland and the Czech Republic, in the round of 16 and quarterfinal games, respectively. However, they were beaten in the semifinal game by Lithuania, by a score of 67–64, and they would go on to eventually lose to the tournament's host team, France, in the bronze-medal game, by a score of 81–68. Milutinov appeared in 6 games during the tournament, playing in only 3.5 minutes per game, the lowest on the team.

At the 2019 FIBA Basketball World Cup, the national team of Serbia was dubbed as favorite to win the trophy, but was eventually upset in the quarterfinals by Argentina. With wins over the United States and Czech Republic, it finished in fifth place. Milutinov averaged 7 points and 2.3 rebounds over 8 games.

In 2023, Milutinov won silver medal at the 2023 FIBA Basketball World Cup with the Serbia national team. He averaged 12.1 points and 8.4 rebounds per game on 66.1% shooting from the field. In recognition of his individual play, Milutinov was named to the All-FIBA World Cup Second Team. He won the bronze medal at the 2024 Summer Olympics with Serbia.

== Career statistics ==
Legend
GP	Games played	GS	Games started	MPG	Minutes per game
FG%	Field-goal percentage	3P%	3-point field-goal percentage	FT%	Free-throw percentage
RPG	Rebounds per game	APG	Assists per game	SPG	Steals per game
BPG	Blocks per game	PPG	Points per game	PIR	Performance index rating
**Bold**	Career high

=== EuroLeague ===
†	Denotes season in which Milutinov won the EuroLeague
*	Led the league

Year	Team	GP	GS	MPG	FG%	3P%	FT%	RPG	APG	SPG	BPG	PPG	PIR
2012–13	Partizan	8	1	7.5	.556	—	.750	1.4	.1	.1	.3	3.3	2.9
2013–14	Partizan	21	16	20.3	.513	—	.640	3.3	1.0	.2	.6	4.7	4.4
2015–16	Olympiacos	18	13	10.8	.542	—	.778	2.7	.3	.3	.7	3.7	4.1
2016–17	Olympiacos	36	15	12.7	.579	.000	.692	3.3	.6	.3	**.8**	4.4	5.8
2017–18	Olympiacos	29	26	21.7	.653	—	.756	5.7	1.0	**.6**	.6	8.8	14.0
2018–19	Olympiacos	28	28	**26.0**	.663	**1.000**	.740	7.9	**1.5**	**.6**	.7	**11.7**	**20.0**
2019–20	Olympiacos	24	24	24.6	.656	—	.765	8.2*	1.2	.5	.6	10.3	19.2
2020–21	CSKA Moscow	20	19	23.5	.667	.500	.702	**8.6**	.8	.4	.5	9.9	17.9
2021–22	CSKA Moscow	16	13	19.2	.578	.000	.711	6.5	.9	.4	.4	7.7	13.6
2023–24	Olympiacos	27	4	18.1	.610	—	.822	5.6	.9	.3	.6	7.8	14.3
2024–25	Olympiacos	29	4	19.5	.582	.000	**.837**	5.8	.8	.6	.7	8.2	14.4
2025–26†	Olympiacos	**40**	**40**	21.5	**.668**	.000	.781	7.2*	1.4	**.6**	.6	10.2	19.4
Career		296	203	19.3	.624	.250	.761	5.8	.9	.4	.6	7.9	13.5

=== EuroCup ===
Year	Team	GP	GS	MPG	FG%	3P%	FT%	RPG	APG	SPG	BPG	PPG	PIR
2014–15	Partizan	9	8	22.4	.442	—	.773	6.0	1.3	.4	.3	7.0	8.4
Career		9	8	22.4	.442	—	.773	6.0	1.3	.4	.3	7.0	8.4

=== Domestic leagues ===
Year	Team	League	GP	MPG	FG%	3P%	FT%	RPG	APG	SPG	BPG	PPG
2011–12	(Serbia) Vršac	KLS	1	2.0	.000	—	—	2.0	—	—	—	0.0
2011–12	(Serbia) Vršac	ABA	2	4.1	—	—	—	1.0	—	—	—	0.0
2012–13	(Serbia) Partizan	KLS	19	11.0	.422	—	.500	2.2	.3	.0	.3	2.3
2012–13	(Serbia) Partizan	ABA	28	9.0	.432	—	.563	1.5	.1	.1	.0	1.7
2013–14	(Serbia) Partizan	KLS	17	19.1	.641	—	.553	3.8	.7	.4	.6	7.1
2013–14	(Serbia) Partizan	ABA	20	16.6	.471	.000	.600	2.7	.2	.4	.2	4.3
2014–15	(Serbia) Partizan	KLS	19	24.5	.556	.500	.570	8.4	1.8	.5	.9	11.0
2014–15	(Serbia) Partizan	ABA	29	28.0	.573	.000	.587	7.6	1.3	.4	.8	9.8
2015–16	(Greece) Olympiacos	GBL	34	11.3	.581	—	.614	3.0	.6	.4	.7	3.7
2016–17	(Greece) Olympiacos	GBL	31	15.4	.609	—	.712	4.0	.9	.5	.8	5.8
2017–18	(Greece) Olympiacos	GBL	27	17.1	.652	—	.698	5.4	1.0	.7	1.0	7.2
2018–19	(Greece) Olympiacos	GBL	24	21.8	.671	.000	.667	7.0	1.7	.7	.7	10.9
2020–21	(Russia) CSKA Moscow	VTBUL	11	20.2	.655	—	.800	6.6	1.4	.3	.8	9.1
2021–22	(Russia) CSKA Moscow	VTBUL	21	25.3	.648	.000	.847	9.9	1.6	.7	.6	12.9
2022–23	(Russia) CSKA Moscow	VTBUL	40	23.3	.655	.500	.801	8.4	1.4	.3	.6	14.6
2023–24	(Greece) Olympiacos	GBL	21	23.9	.658	.000	.780	7.8	1.4	.4	1.0	13.5
2024–25	(Greece) Olympiacos	GBL	22	20.1	.730	.000	.750	6.5	1.6	.3	.5	9.0
2025–26	(Greece) Olympiacos	GBL	24	19.1	.631	.000	.746	5.5	1.9	.4	1.0	7.5

== See also ==
- List of NBA drafted players from Serbia
- San Antonio Spurs draft history
