= Milovan Raković =

Serbian basketball player (born 1985)

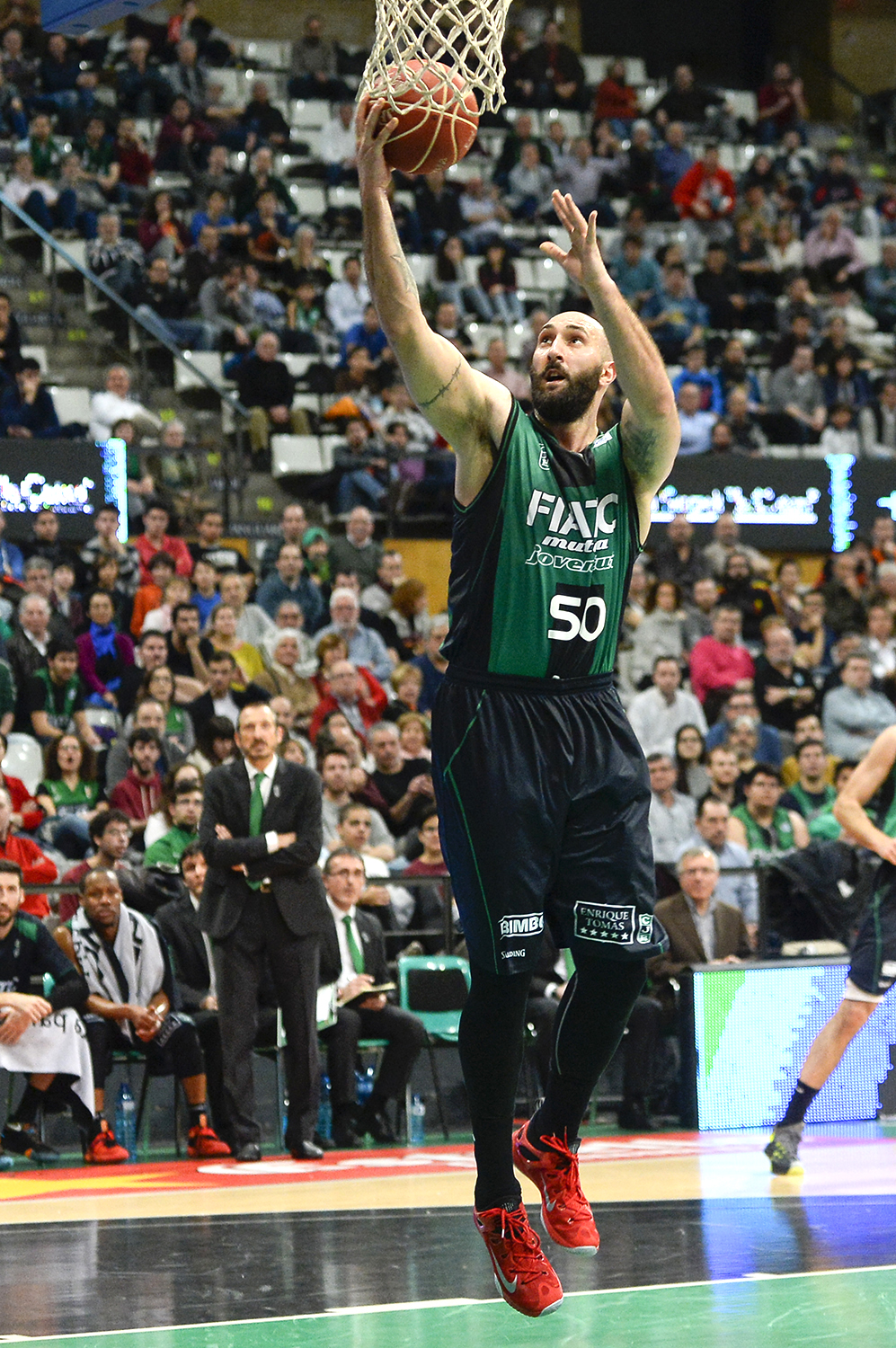
- Raković with Joventut in February 2016.

Personal information
- Born: 19 February 1985 (age 41) Titovo Užice, SR Serbia, SFR Yugoslavia
- Listed height: 2.08 m (6 ft 10 in)
- Listed weight: 127 kg (280 lb)

Career information
- NBA draft: 2007: 2nd round, 60th overall pick
- Drafted by: Dallas Mavericks
- Playing career: 2003–2018
- Position: Center

Career history
- 2003–2004: Polet Keramika
- 2004–2006: Atlas
- 2006–2007: Mega Ishrana
- 2007–2010: Spartak Saint Petersburg
- 2010–2012: Montepaschi Siena
- 2011–2012: →Žalgiris
- 2012–2013: Bilbao
- 2013–2014: Triumph Lyubertsy
- 2014–2015: Türk Telekom
- 2016: Joventut
- 2017–2018: Union Neuchâtel

Career highlights
- LKL All-Star (2012); LKL champion (2012); LKF Cup winner (2012); Baltic League champion (2012); Italian League champion (2011); Italian Cup winner (2011)
- Stats at Basketball Reference
Medals
Men's basketball
Representing Serbia and Montenegro / FR Yugoslavia
U20 European Championship
| Bronze medal – third place | 2005 Russia | Team |
European Championship for Cadets
| Gold medal – first place | 2001 Latvia | Team |

Milovan Raković (Serbian Cyrillic: Милован Раковић; born 19 February 1985) is a Serbian former professional basketball player. He is a 2.08 m tall center.

== Professional career ==
Raković played in youth categories of KK Partizan. He made his senior debut with Polet Keramika in the 2003–04 season. From 2004 to 2006 he played with Atlas and for the 2006–07 season he moved to Mega Ishrana.

In 2007, he joined the Russian Super League club Spartak Saint Petersburg and stayed with them for three seasons. On 6 July 2010, he signed a three-year deal with the Italian club Montepaschi Siena. In July 2011, he was loaned to Žalgiris Kaunas in Lithuania for the 2011–12 season. In the summer of 2012, he parted ways with Siena.

On 10 July 2012, Raković signed two-year contract with the Spanish team Bilbao Basket. After being released from Bilbao Basket, he signed a one-year deal with Triumph Lyubertsy on 25 July 2013. On 18 July 2014, he signed a two-year deal with Türk Telekom. After one season, he left the Turkish club. On 20 January 2016, he signed with the Spanish club Joventut Badalona for the rest of the 2015–16 ACB season.

On 7 December 2017, he signed with Union Neuchâtel Basket of the Swiss Basketball League.

=== NBA draft rights ===
Raković was the last player picked in the 2007 NBA draft; he was selected by the Dallas Mavericks and then traded along with cash to the Orlando Magic. On 14 July 2014, Raković's rights were traded from the Orlando Magic to the Chicago Bulls. On 8 February 2018, Raković's draft rights were traded from the Chicago Bulls to the Portland Trail Blazers in exchange for Noah Vonleh and cash considerations.

== Career statistics ==
Legend
| GP | Games played | GS | Games started | MPG | Minutes per game |
| FG% | Field-goal percentage | 3P% | 3-point field-goal percentage | FT% | Free-throw percentage |
| RPG | Rebounds per game | APG | Assists per game | SPG | Steals per game |
| BPG | Blocks per game | PPG | Points per game | PIR | Performance index rating |
| **Bold** | Career high |

=== EuroLeague ===
| * | Led the league |

| Year | Team | GP | GS | MPG | FG% | 3P% | FT% | RPG | APG | SPG | BPG | PPG | PIR |
|---|---|---|---|---|---|---|---|---|---|---|---|---|---|
| 2010–11 | Mens Sana | **22** | **22*** | **17.4** | **.547** | — | .560 | **3.8** | **.4** | **.7** | .2 | **8.0** | **6.3** |
| 2011–12 | Žalgiris | 16 | 2 | 15.5 | .522 | — | **.567** | 2.6 | **.4** | .6 | **.3** | 7.1 | 4.6 |
| Career | | 38 | 24 | 16.6 | .538 | — | .564 | 3.3 | .4 | .6 | .2 | 7.6 | 5.6 |

== National team career ==
As a member of the FR Yugoslavia under-16 national team, he won a gold medal at the 2001 FIBA Europe Under-16 Championship.

== See also ==
- List of NBA drafted players from Serbia
- Denver Nuggets draft history
