= Denver Nuggets draft history =

List of draft selections by American basketball team

The Denver Nuggets are an American professional basketball team based in Denver, Colorado. The Nuggets compete in the National Basketball Association (NBA) as a member club of the league's Western Conference Northwest Division. The team was founded as the Denver Larks in 1967 as a charter franchise of the American Basketball Association (ABA), but changed its name to Rockets before the first season. It changed its name again to the Nuggets in 1974. The team joined the NBA in 1976 after the ABA–NBA merger. They first participated in the NBA draft in 1977.

== Selections ==
Year	Pick	Overall	Player	Nationality	College/High School/Club
1977	1	9	Tom LaGarde	United States	North Carolina
1977	1	21	Anthony Roberts	United States	Oral Roberts
1977	3	65	Robert Smith	United States	UNLV
1977	5	109	John Billups	United States	Ole Miss
1977	6	130	Jim Town	United States	Massachusetts
1977	7	148	Willie High	United States	Alabama State
1977	8	169	Len Saunders	United States	Florida
1978	1	17	Rod Griffin	United States	Wake Forest
1978	1	21	Mike Evans	United States	Kansas State
1978	3	46	Hollis Copeland	United States	Rutgers
1978	5	106	Mike Edwards	United States	Texas–Pan American
1978	6	127	Robert Heard	United States	Columbus (GA) (Note: Granted university status and changed name to Columbus State University in 1996.)
1978	7	148	Jack Gilloon	United States	South Carolina
1978	8	166	Larry Vaculik	United States	Colorado
1978	9	183	Tom Schneeberger	United States	Air Force
1978	10	198	Phil Taylor	United States	Arizona
1979	2	30	Gary Garland	United States	DePaul
1979	5	102	Larry Williams	United States	Louisville
1979	6	122	Odell Ball	United States	Marquette
1979	7	144	John Johnson	United States	Creighton
1979	8	162	Matt Teahan	United States	Denver
1979	9	179	Emmett Lewis	United States	Colorado
1980	1	5	James Ray	United States	Jacksonville
1980	1	23	Carl Nicks	United States	Indiana State
1980	2	41	Jawann Oldham	United States	Seattle
1980	3	47	Kurt Nimphius	United States	Arizona State
1980	3	48	Eddie Lee	United States	Cincinnati
1980	3	51	Ronnie Valentine	United States	Old Dominion
1980	4	73	Sammie Ellis	United States	Pittsburgh
1980	5	97	James Patrick	United States	Texas State
1980	6	119	Ernie Hill	United States	Oklahoma City
1980	7	143	Tommy Springer	United States	Vanderbilt
1980	9	184	Jim Graziano	United States	South Carolina
1980	10	202	Earl Sango	United States	Regis University
1981	2	34	Ken Green	United States	Texas–Pan American
1981	5	101	Willie Sims	United States	LSU
1981	6	124	Alonzo Weatherley	United States	Denver
1981	7	147	Greg Manning	United States	Maryland
1981	8	169	Curtis Redding	United States	St. John's (NY)
1981	9	191	Andrew Burton	United States	Austin Peay State
1981	10	211	Derrick Rowland	United States	Potsdam State
1982	1	19	Rob Williams	United States	Arizona State
1982	3	62	Roylin Bond	United States	Pepperdine
1982	4	73	Alford Turner	United States	Louisiana-Lafayette
1982	5	109	Bill Duffy	United States	Santa Clara
1982	6	131	Chris Brust	United States	North Carolina
1982	7	153	Jeb Barlow	United States	North Carolina
1982	8	178	Donny Speer	United States	UAB
1982	9	200	Dean Sears	United States	UCLA
1982	10	220	Mike Phillips	United States	Niagara
1983	9	184	Jim Graziano	United States	South Carolina
1983	1	15	Howard Carter	United States	LSU
1983	2	37	David Russell	United States	St. John's (NY)
1983	3	61	David Little	United States	Oklahoma
1983	4	83	York Gross	United States	UC Santa Barbara
1983	5	107	James Braddock	United States	North Carolina
1983	6	129	Glen Green	United States	Murray State
1983	7	153	Maurice McDaniel	United States	Catawba (SC)
1983	8	175	Cliff Tribus	United States	Davidson
1983	9	198	Bobby Van Noy	United States	Catawba (SC)
1983	10	218	Cleveland McCrae	United States	Catawba (SC)
1984	2	42	Willie White	United States	Tennessee-Chattanooga
1984	4	79	Karl Tilleman	Canada	Calgary (Canada)
1984	5	103	Prince Bridges	United States	Missouri
1984	6	131	Willie Burton	United States	Tennessee
1984	7	149	Mark Simpson	United States	Catawba (SC)
1984	8	171	Bill Wendtland	United States	Texas Austin
1984	9	194	Cecil Exum	United States; Australia	North Carolina
1984	10	220	Dexter Bailey	United States	Xavier (Ohio)
1985	1	15	Blair Rasmussen	United States	Oregon
1985	2	43	Barry Stevens	United States	Iowa State
1985	4	89	Pete Williams	United States	Arizona
1985	5	112	Kenny Brown	United States	Texas A&M
1985	6	135	Joe Carrabino	United States	Harvard
1985	7	158	Eddie Smith	United States	Arizona
1986	1	16	Maurice Martin	United States	St. Joseph's (NY)
1986	1	18	Mark Alarie	United States	Duke
1986	2	41	Otis Smith	United States	Jacksonville
1986	3	64	Don Redden	United States	LSU
1986	4	87	Anthony Watson	United States	San Diego State
1986	5	110	Jon Collins	United States	Eastern Illinois
1986	6	133	Anthony Frederick	United States	Pepperdine
1986	7	156	Mike Marshall	United States	McNeese State
1987	2	31	Andre Moore	United States	Loyola Chicago
1987	3	54	Tom Schafer	United States	Iowa State
1987	4	77	David Boone	United States	Marquette
1987	5	100	Ron Grandison	United States	New Orleans
1987	6	123	Kelvin Scarborough	United States	New Mexico
1987	7	146	Rowan Gomes	United States	Hampton
1987	7	156	Curtis Hunter	United States	North Carolina
1988	1	23	Jerome Lane	United States	Pittsburgh
1988	2	43	Todd Mitchell	United States	Purdue
1988	2	47	Vernon Maxwell	United States	Florida
1988	3	66	Dwight Boyd	United States	Memphis
1989	1	15	Todd Lichti	United States	Stanford
1989	2	42	Michael Cutright	United States	McNeese State
1989	2	47	Reggie Turner	United States	UAB
1990	1	3	Mahmoud Abdul-Rauf	United States	LSU
1990	2	42	Marcus Liberty	United States	Illinois
1991	1	4	Dikembe Mutombo	DR Congo; United States	Georgetown University
1991	1	8	Mark Macon	United States	Temple
1992	1	5	LaPhonso Ellis	United States	Notre Dame
1992	1	13	Bryant Stith	United States	Virginia
1992	2	46	Robert Werdann	United States	St. John's (NY)
1993	1	9	Rodney Rogers	United States	Wake Forest
1993	2	43	Josh Grant	United States	Utah
1994	1	13	Jalen Rose	United States	Michigan
1995	1	15	Brent Barry	United States	Oregon State
1995	2	44	Anthony Pelle	United States	Fresno State
1996	1	23	Efthimi Rentzias	Greece	PAOK Thessaloniki (Greece)
1996	2	37	Jeff McInnis	United States	North Carolina
1997	1	5	Tony Battie	United States	Texas Tech
1997	2	32	James Cotton	United States	CSU Long Beach
1997	2	41	Jason Lawson	United States	Villanova
1998	1	3	Raef LaFrentz	United States	Kansas
1998	1	23	Tyronn Lue	United States	Nebraska
1998	2	54	Tremaine Fowlkes	United States	Fresno State
1998	2	55	Ryan Bowen	United States	Iowa
1999	1	18	James Posey	United States	Xavier (Ohio)
1999	2	33	Chris Herren	United States	Fresno State
1999	2	41	Francisco Elson	Netherlands	California
2000	1	26	Mamadou N'Diaye	Senegal	Auburn
2000	2	53	Dan McClintock	United States	Northern Arizona
2001	2	46	Ousmane Cisse	Mali	St. Jude Educational Institute (Montgomery, AL)
2002	1	5	Nikoloz Tskitishvili	Georgia	Benetton Treviso (Italy)
2002	1	25	Frank Williams	United States	Illinois
2002	2	33	Vincent Yarbrough	United States	Tennessee
2003	1	3	Carmelo Anthony	United States	Syracuse
2003	2	46	Sani Bečirović	Slovenia	Virtus Pallacanestro Bologna (Italy)
2004	1	20	Jameer Nelson	United States	St. Joseph's (PA)
2005	1	20	Julius Hodge	United States	North Carolina State
2005	1	22	Jarrett Jack	United States	Georgia Tech
2005	2	52	Axel Hervelle	Belgium	Real Madrid Baloncesto (Spain)
2006	2	49	Leon Powe	United States	California
2009	2	34	Sergio Llull	Spain	Real Madrid Baloncesto (Spain)
2011	1	22	Kenneth Faried	United States	Morehead State
2012	1	20	Evan Fournier	France	Poitiers Basket 86 (France)
2012	2	38	Quincy Miller	United States	Baylor
2012	2	50	İzzet Türkyılmaz	Turkey	Banvit B.K. (Turkey)
2013	1	27	Rudy Gobert	France	Cholet Basket (France)
2014	1	11	Doug McDermott	United States	Creighton
2014	2	41	Nikola Jokić	Serbia	KK Mega Basket (Serbia)
2014	2	56	Roy Devyn Marble	United States	Iowa
2015	1	7	Emmanuel Mudiay	DR Congo; United States	Guangdong Southern Tigers (China)
2015	2	57	Nikola Radičević	Serbia	Baloncesto Sevilla (Spain)
2016	1	7	Jamal Murray	Canada	Kentucky
2016	1	15	Juan Hernangómez	Spain	CB Estudiantes (Spain)
2016	1	19	Malik Beasley	United States	Florida State
2016	2	53	Petr Cornelie	France	Le Mans Sarthe Basket (France)
2016	2	56	Daniel Hamilton	United States	Connecticut
2017	1	11	Donovan Mitchell	United States	Louisville
2017	2	49	Vlatko Čančar	Slovenia	KK Mega Basket (Serbia)
2017	2	51	Monté Morris	United States	Iowa State
2018	1	14	Michael Porter Jr.	United States	Missouri
2018	2	43	Justin Jackson	Canada	Maryland
2018	2	58	Thomas Welsh	United States	UCLA
2020	1	22	Zeke Nnaji	United States	Arizona
2021	1	26	Nah'Shon Hyland	United States	VCU
2022	1	21	Christian Braun	United States	Kansas
2023	2	40	Maxwell Lewis	United States	Pepperdine
2024	1	28	Ryan Dunn	United States	Virginia
