= Joffrey Lauvergne =

French basketball player (born 1991)

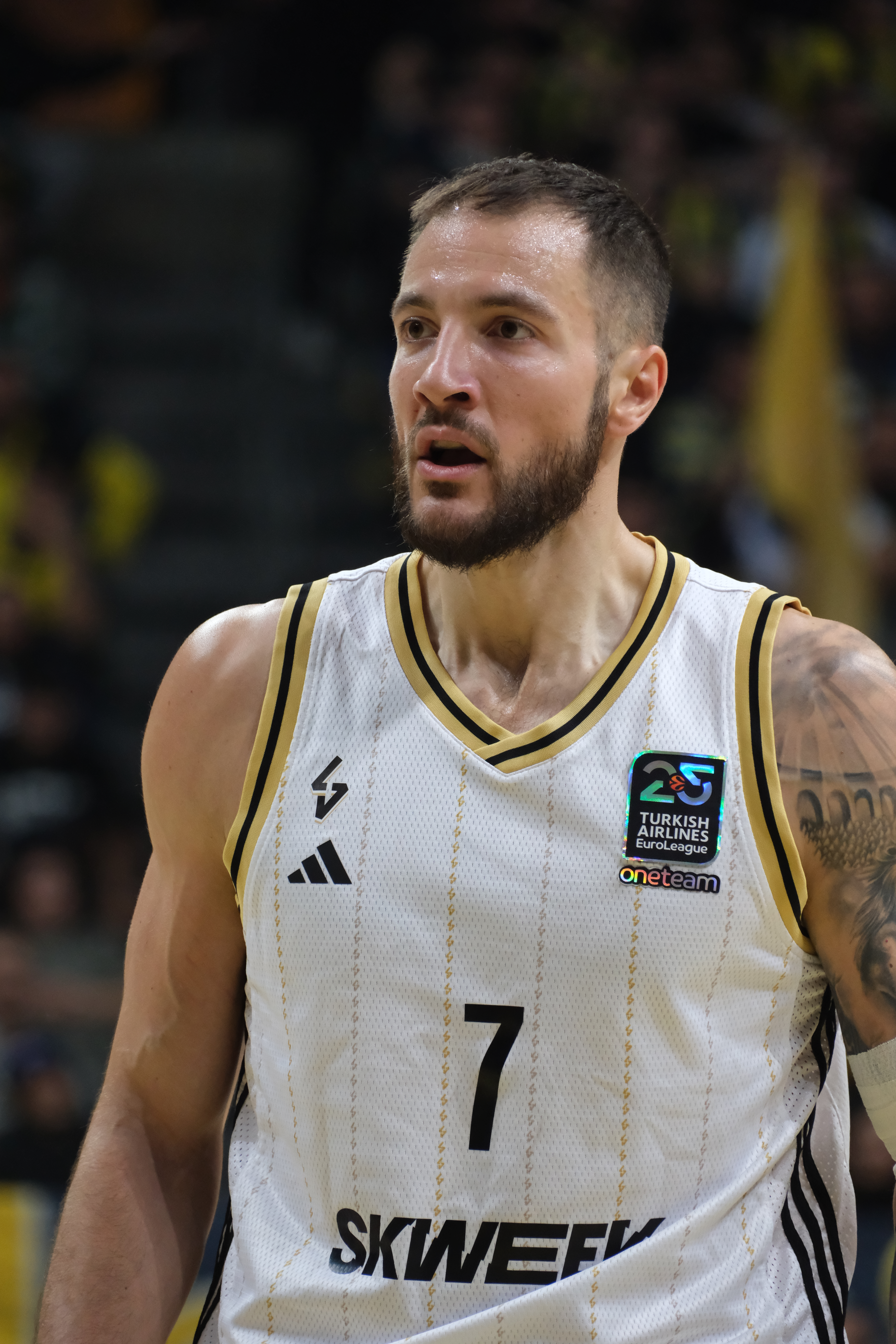
- Lauvergne with ASVEL in 2025

No. 77 – Partizan Belgrade
- Position: Center
- League: Serbian SuperLeague; ABA League; EuroLeague

Personal information
- Born: 30 September 1991 (age 35) Mulhouse, France
- Listed height: 6 ft 11 in (2.11 m)
- Listed weight: 260 lb (118 kg)

Career information
- High school: INSEP (Paris, France)
- NBA draft: 2013: 2nd round, 55th overall pick
- Drafted by: Memphis Grizzlies
- Playing career: 2009–present

Career history
- 2009–2012: Élan Chalon
- 2012: Valencia
- 2012–2014: Partizan
- 2014–2015: Khimki
- 2015–2016: Denver Nuggets
- 2016–2017: Oklahoma City Thunder
- 2017: Chicago Bulls
- 2017–2018: San Antonio Spurs
- 2018–2020: Fenerbahçe
- 2020–2022: Žalgiris Kaunas
- 2022–2025: ASVEL
- 2025–2026: Kuwait SC
- 2026–present: Partizan

Career highlights
- EuroLeague rebounding leader (2014); LKL champion (2021); All-LKL Team (2021); 2× King Mindaugas Cup champion (2021, 2022); 2× King Mindaugas Cup MVP (2021, 2022); 2× Turkish Cup winner (2019, 2020); ABA League champion (2013); All-ABA League Team (2014); 2× Serbian League champion (2013, 2014); French League champion (2012); 2× French Cup winner (2011, 2012); French Leaders Cup winner (2012)
- Stats at NBA.com
- Stats at Basketball Reference
Medals
Men's basketball
Representing France
World Cup
Bronze medal – third place	2014 Spain
EuroBasket
Gold medal – first place	2013 Slovenia
Bronze medal – third place	2015 France–Croatia–Germany–Latvia
U20 European Championship
Bronze medal – third place	2011 Spain

Joffrey Stéphane Morgan Lauvergne (born 30 September 1991) is a French professional basketball player for Partizan Belgrade of the Serbian SuperLeague, the ABA League, and the EuroLeague. He was drafted 55th overall by the Memphis Grizzlies in the 2013 NBA draft, who then traded his rights to the Denver Nuggets.

== Professional career ==
=== Élan Chalon (2009–2012) ===
After two years in INSEP (2007–2009), Joffrey Lauvergne arrived in Chalon-sur-Saône in 2009. With Élan Chalon he won a French League in 2012, two French Cups in 2011 and 2012, and Leaders Cup in 2012. Lauvergne averaged 5.4 points and 3.4 rebounds per game in the French League. He was waived by the team on 25 November 2012.

=== Valencia (2012) ===
On 28 November, 2012, Lauvergne signed a short-term deal with the ACB club Valencia. He averaged 5.8 points and 3.8 rebounds per game in five matches.

=== Partizan (2012–2014) ===
On 28 December, 2012, Lauvergne signed a two-and-a-half-year contract with Partizan Belgrade. After breakthrough half-season he was having in Partizan, he was drafted 55th overall by the Memphis Grizzlies in the 2013 NBA draft, who then traded his rights to the Denver Nuggets. It was also announced that he will stay some time overseas before joining the NBA.

Later in the summer of 2013, Lauvergne confirmed that he will stay with the club for another season, despite the financial problems the club was facing. In his second EuroLeague season, with lot of trust from head coach Duško Vujošević, he has made big steps forward in his development, becoming one of the best rebounders in the league averaging 9.3 rebounds in 10 regular season games. His games haven't gone unseen, as Denver Nuggets general manager Tim Connelly has said that they really liked the progress he has made through the season. When team captain Dragan Milosavljević got injured, Lauvergne was appointed as new team captain. This made him first foreign captain in history of the Serbian team. Over 24 games in the EuroLeague, he averaged 11.1 points per game, while also leading the league with 8.6 rebounds per game. Along with his teammate Bogdan Bogdanović, he was selected to the Ideal Team of the 2013–14 ABA League season. Partizan finished season by winning its 13th consecutive title, defeating arch rivals Crvena zvezda by 3–1 in the final series.

Day after leaving Partizan, he left the farewell letter praising his old teammates, coaching staff, fans and Serbian people in general. He also stated that he was feeling like part of family, almost like at home, surrounded with love and care from the people in the club.

=== Khimki (2014–2015) ===
On 23 June, 2014, he signed a two-year deal with the Russian club Khimki. According to the Serbian daily press Večernje novosti, Partizan also received US$600,000 in the name of buyout from Khimki, as Lauvergne was still under contract with Partizan.

On 4 February, 2015, Lauvergne parted ways with Khimki. Over 27 games, he averaged 9.4 points, 4.4 rebounds and 1.1 assists per game.

=== Denver Nuggets (2015–2016) ===
On 19 February, 2015, Lauvergne signed a reported two-year deal with the Denver Nuggets. Three days later, he made his NBA debut, recording 8 points and 3 rebounds in the Nuggets' 119–94 loss to the Oklahoma City Thunder.

On 19 February, 2016, Lauvergne scored a career-high 22 points in the Nuggets' 116–110 loss to the Sacramento Kings.

=== Oklahoma City Thunder (2016–2017) ===
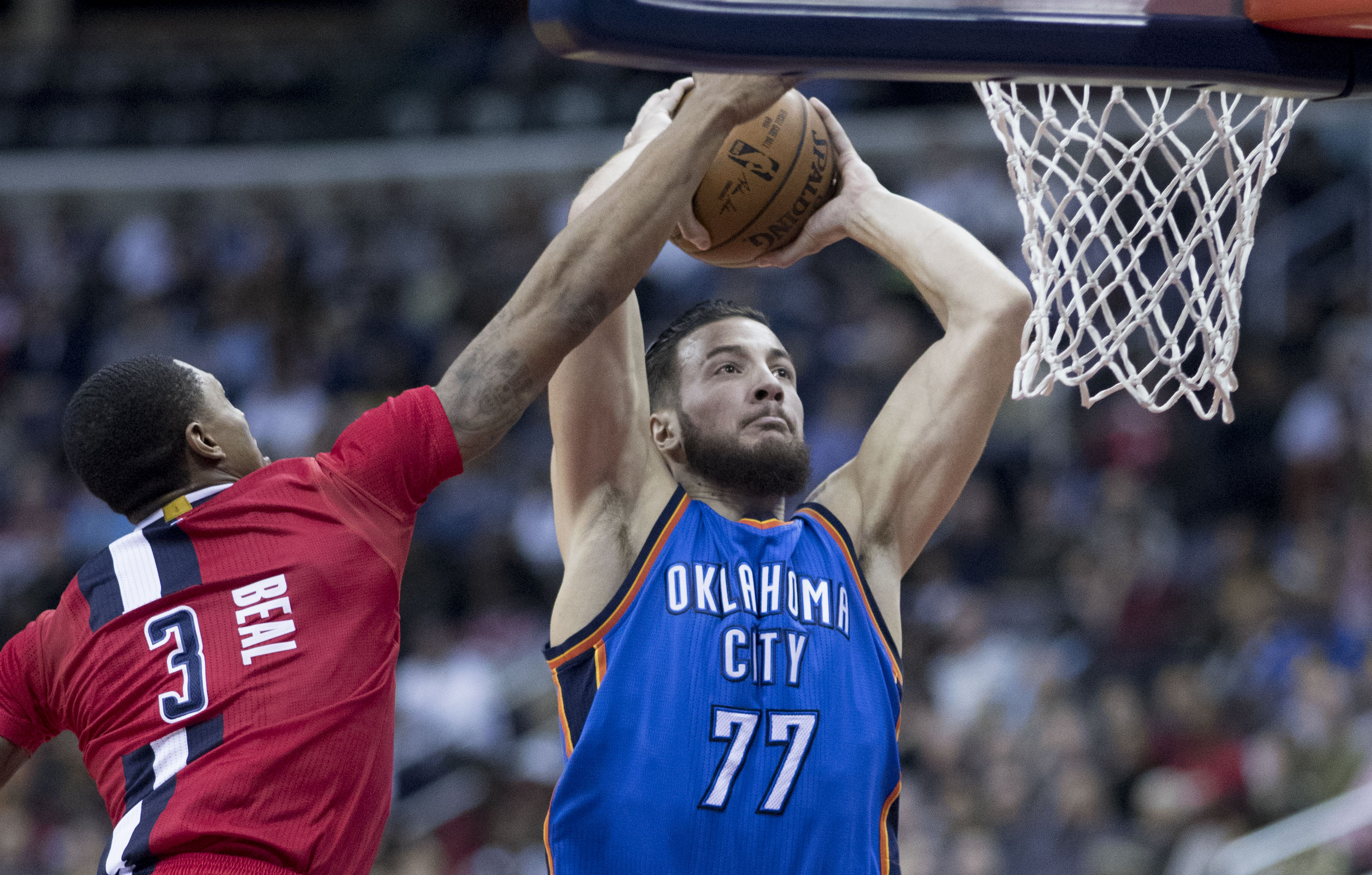
Lauvergne with the Thunder in 2017

On 30 August, 2016, Lauvergne was traded to the Oklahoma City Thunder in exchange for two protected 2017 second round draft picks. On 3 February, 2017, he scored a season-high 16 points in a 114–102 win over the Memphis Grizzlies.

=== Chicago Bulls (2017) ===
On 23 February, 2017, Lauvergne was traded, along with Cameron Payne and Anthony Morrow, to the Chicago Bulls in exchange for Taj Gibson, Doug McDermott and a 2018 second-round draft pick.

=== San Antonio Spurs (2017–2018) ===
On 18 July, 2017, Lauvergne signed with the San Antonio Spurs. On February 13, 2018, he scored a career-high 26 points to go with a season-high 11 rebounds in a 117–109 loss to the Denver Nuggets.

=== Fenerbahçe (2018–2020) ===
On 4 July, 2018, Lauvergne signed a two-year deal with the Turkish club Fenerbahçe. Lauvergne had 12 points on 4-from-7 shooting, along with 4 rebounds in his EuroLeague debut versus Gran Canaria. Over 22 EuroLeague games during the 2018–2019 season, he averaged 8.5 points, 3.6 rebounds and career-high 1.8 assists per game.

=== Žalgiris Kaunas (2020–2022) ===
On 14 July, 2020, Lauvergne signed with Žalgiris Kaunas of the Lithuanian Basketball League (LKL). On 28 January, 2021, Žalgiris and Lauvergne agreed on a 1+1 extension deal until the end of the 2022–2023 season. On 7 October, 2021, Lauvergne suffered a shoulder injury which sidelined him for most of the 2021–2022 season.

=== ASVEL (2022–2025) ===
On June 30, 2022, Lauvergne signed with ASVEL of the French LNB Pro A.

=== Kuwait SC (2025–2026) ===
On October 12, 2025, Lauvergne signed with Kuwait SC of the Kuwaiti League and the FIBA West Asia Super League.

=== Return to Partizan (2026–present) ===
On April 15, 2026, Lauvergne signed for Partizan Mozzart Bet of the Serbian KLS, the ABA League and the EuroLeague.

== Career statistics ==
Legend
GP	Games played	GS	Games started	MPG	Minutes per game
FG%	Field-goal percentage	3P%	3-point field-goal percentage	FT%	Free-throw percentage
RPG	Rebounds per game	APG	Assists per game	SPG	Steals per game
BPG	Blocks per game	PPG	Points per game	PIR	Performance index rating
**Bold**	Career high

=== NBA ===
==== Regular season ====
Year	Team	GP	GS	MPG	FG%	3P%	FT%	RPG	APG	SPG	BPG	PPG
2014–15	Denver	24	1	11.2	.404	.188	.643	3.2	.5	.3	**.4**	3.9
2015–16	Denver	**59**	**15**	**17.6**	.513	.245	**.899**	**4.9**	.9	.2	.3	**7.9**
2016–17	Oklahoma City	50	0	14.8	.455	**.346**	.638	3.7	**1.0**	.3	.1	5.7
2016–17	Chicago	20	1	12.1	.402	.300	.600	3.4	**1.0**	**.4**	.0	4.5
2017–18	San Antonio	55	1	9.7	**.516**	.000	.638	3.1	.7	.2	.1	4.1
Career		208	18	13.6	.479	.285	.719	3.8	.9	.3	.2	5.6

==== Playoffs ====
Year	Team	GP	GS	MPG	FG%	3P%	FT%	RPG	APG	SPG	BPG	PPG
2017	Chicago	**3**	0	**8.7**	.364	.000	**1.000**	**3.0**	**1.7**	—	—	**4.7**
2018	San Antonio	1	0	6.0	**1.000**	—	—	1.0	—	—	—	2.0
Career		4	0	8.0	.417	.000	1.000	2.5	1.3	—	—	4.0

=== EuroLeague ===
*	Led the league

Year	Team	GP	GS	MPG	FG%	3P%	FT%	RPG	APG	SPG	BPG	PPG	PIR
2012–13	Élan Chalon	7	5	15.4	.531	**.500**	**.800**	3.6	.9	.1	.1	6.6	6.3
2013–14	Partizan	24	24	**32.3***	.515	.229	.714	**8.6***	1.0	.6	**.3**	11.1	**15.4**
2018–19	Fenerbahçe	22	4	18.0	.559	.300	.514	3.6	**1.8**	.4	**.3**	8.5	10.1
2019–20	Fenerbahçe	19	9	13.9	.543	.286	.441	2.7	.8	.2	.2	6.3	6.6
2020–21	Žalgiris	**32**	**31**	20.9	.586	.400	.660	5.6	1.5	.5	.1	10.7	12.0
2021–22	Žalgiris	13	4	15.3	.523	—	.692	3.4	.9	.4	.2	8.3	8.9
2022–23	ASVEL	3	0	18.0	**.600**	—	.700	2.3	1.3	**.7**	—	8.3	10.7
2023–24	ASVEL	31	21	24.6	.513	.358	.726	5.2	**1.8**	.4	.2	**12.6**	13.0
Career		151	98	21.4	.542	.320	.656	5.0	1.4	.4	.2	9.8	11.2

=== EuroCup ===
Year	Team	GP	GS	MPG	FG%	3P%	FT%	RPG	APG	SPG	BPG	PPG	PIR
2012–13	Valencia	2	0	16.0	**.692**	**.500**	.600	3.0	—	**.5**	.5	**11.0**	**12.0**
2014–15	Khimki	**13**	**3**	**20.5**	.484	.333	**.700**	**5.0**	**1.1**	**.5**	**.7**	9.6	10.9
Career		15	3	17.8	.484	.333	.700	4.3	.9	.5	.6	8.3	9.5

=== FIBA EuroChallenge ===
Year	Team	GP	GS	MPG	FG%	3P%	FT%	RPG	APG	SPG	BPG	PPG
2009–10	Élan Chalon	11	0	11.5	**.649**	**.600**	.556	2.5	**.5**	.2	—	**5.5**
2011–12	Élan Chalon	**15**	0	**16.6**	.435	.333	**.667**	**4.5**	.4	**.5**	**.1**	5.2
Career		26	0	14.4	.542	.391	.611	3.7	.4	.4	.0	5.3

=== Domestic leagues ===
Year	Team	League	GP	MPG	FG%	3P%	FT%	RPG	APG	SPG	BPG	PPG
2007–08	(France) INSEP	NM1	8	13.5	.231	.000	.571	2.6	.3	.4	—	3.3
2008–09	(France) INSEP	NM1	1	14.0	.333	.000	.000	5.0	1.0	—	—	4.0
2009–10	(France) Élan Chalon	Pro A	20	9.9	.347	.250	.619	2.0	.2	.2	.0	2.5
2010–11	(France) Élan Chalon	Pro A	32	14.5	.455	.235	.642	3.5	.7	.5	.4	5.7
2011–12	(France) Élan Chalon	Pro A	30	14.8	.497	.243	.688	4.1	.5	.7	.3	6.2
2012–13	(France) Élan Chalon	Pro A	7	16.4	.417	.400	.692	4.1	.6	.1	.1	5.9
2012–13	(Spain) Valencia	ACB	5	9.9	.529	.500	.769	3.8	.2	.4	.2	5.8
2012–13	(Serbia) Partizan	KLS	20	26.2	.639	.200	.616	6.7	1.4	1.0	.7	10.4
2012–13	(Serbia) Partizan	ABA	13	14.4	.521	.143	.667	3.4	.6	.4	.1	5.1
2013–14	(Serbia) Partizan	KLS	19	28.5	.532	.270	.746	7.4	2.3	.7	.3	11.9
2013–14	(Serbia) Partizan	ABA	26	32.1	.493	.321	.707	7.3	1.3	.8	.4	10.8
2014–15	(Russia) Khimki	VTBUL	14	17.0	.652	.286	.773	4.2	1.1	.1	.3	10.9
2018–19	(Turkey) Fenerbahçe	TBSL	13	23.7	.602	.429	.579	5.9	1.5	.5	.5	12.6
2019–20	(Turkey) Fenerbahçe	TBSL	12	21.6	.667	.400	.333	6.7	1.9	.4	.2	9.9
2020–21	(Lithuania) Žalgiris	LKL	35	18.2	.690	.000	.774	5.0	1.4	.6	.3	11.0
2021–22	(Lithuania) Žalgiris	LKL	23	15.4	.566	.000	.636	4.2	.8	.4	.3	9.6
2022–23	(France) ASVEL	LNB Élite	5	21.0	.667	.500	.889	5.0	1.8	.2	.4	10.6
2023–24	(France) ASVEL	LNB Élite	34	21.3	.590	.349	.724	5.3	1.6	.4	.2	11.3

== National team career ==
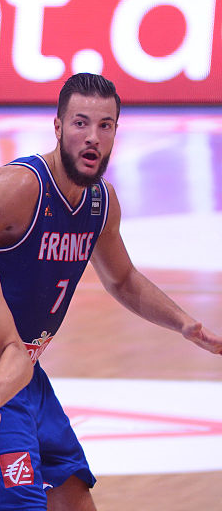
Lauvergne with France

Lauvergne is a member of the senior men's French national basketball team. He won the gold medal with France at the EuroBasket 2013. The following summer, he won the bronze medal with France at the 2014 World Cup. His role in the team increased, and he averaged 9.2 points and 5.3 rebounds over nine tournament games.

=== International stats ===
Tournament	GP	PPG	RPG	APG
2013 EuroBasket	9	3.8	2.8	0.3
2014 World Cup	9	9.2	5.3	0.4
2015 EuroBasket	9	9.6	5.6	0.8
2016 Summer Olympics	5	9.4	3.6	0.6

== Personal life ==
Although Lauvergne keeps his personal life out of the public eye, in several interviews he admitted to being married.

On 8 October 2020 Lauvergne was reported to have tested positive for COVID-19. However, after redoing the test twice, it turned out the initial test was a false positive and Lauvergne had not contracted COVID-19.

== See also ==
- List of foreign basketball players in Serbia
- List of NBA drafted players from Serbia

Sporting positions
Preceded by Dragan Milosavljević (injury)	Partizan Belgrade captain (acting); 2014	Succeeded by Dragan Milosavljević
