= History of African Americans in Utah =

African Americans in Utah

African Americans in Utah
Total population
- 69,900 including those with partial Black ancestry (2.2% of Utah's population) (2021)

Regions with significant populations
- Salt Lake City, South Salt Lake

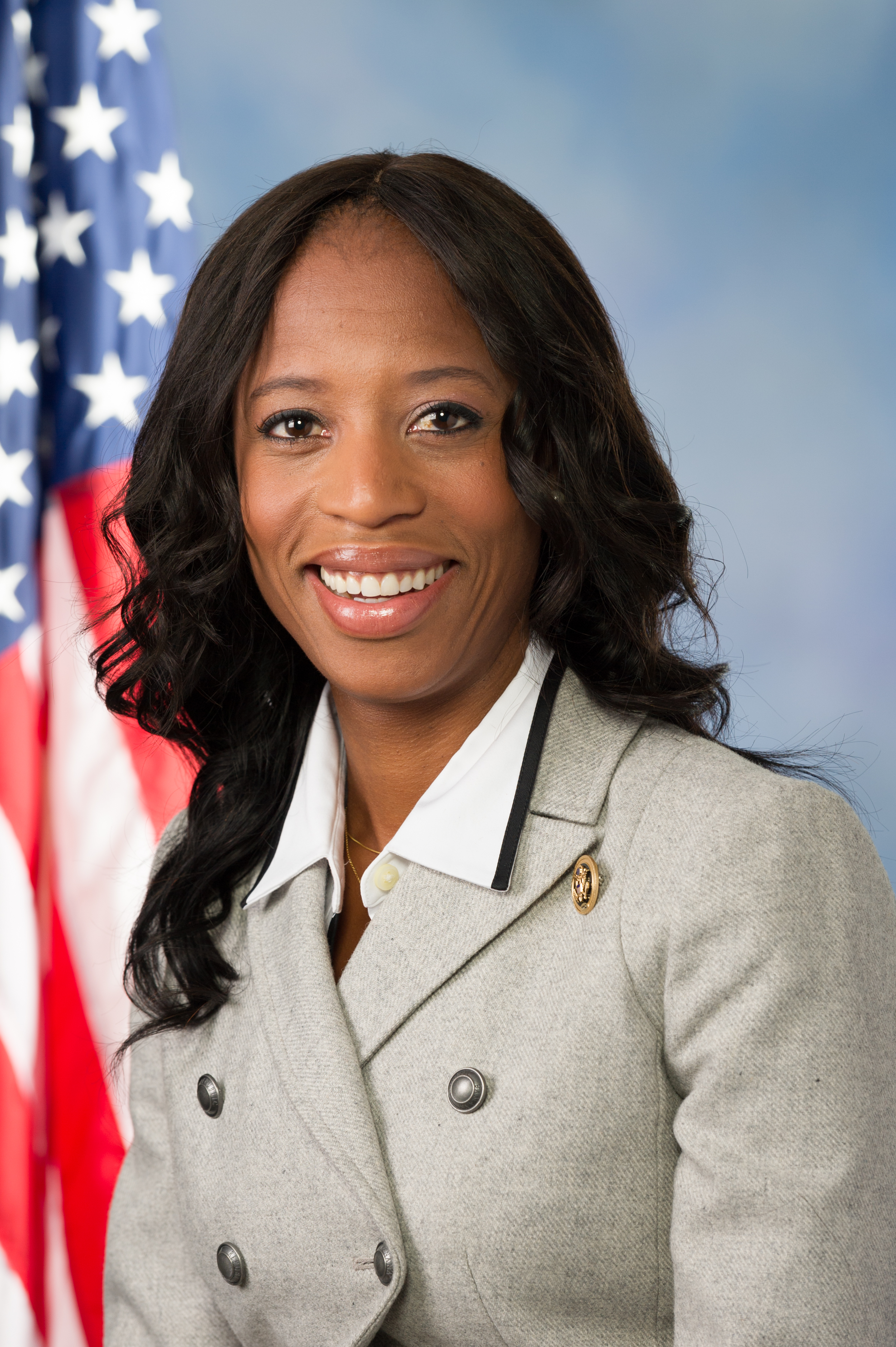
Mia Love, first African American Congresswoman from Utah

The first African Americans to arrive in Utah were fur trappers in the early 19th century. The second influx consisted of both freedmen who were converts to the Church of Jesus Christ of Latter-day Saints (LDS Church) and slaves belonging to white converts. Later, most African American immigrants to Utah would migrate out for labor-related motivations. African Americans have traditionally been composed only a small part of the total population in Utah, with the 2010 census placing the percentage of African Americans at 1.06%. Utah ranks 40th in the United States for total African American population and 43rd in percentage of residents who are African American.

Including Multiracial people who are partly Black, Utah has 69,000 Black residents, with 35,000 reporting sole Black ancestry. That means Black people account for one and two percent of Utah's population under those respective categories. Utah's Black population is mainly centered in Salt Lake County, which is about three percent Black; South Salt Lake has the highest percentage of African Americans of any city or town in Utah, with at least 11% of its residents identifying as Black. Ogden has a sizeable Black population as well, relative to Utah's general Black population.

== Fur trapping and exploration period (early 1800s to 1847) ==
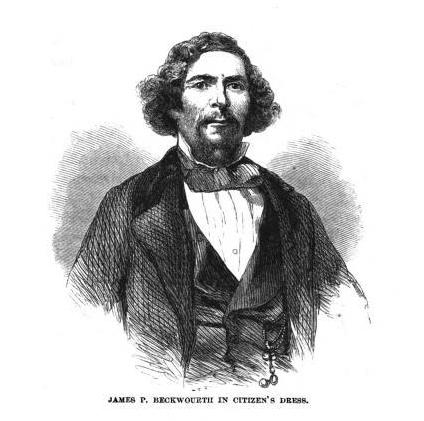
James P. Beckwourth, fur trapper

The only record of African American presence in Utah prior to the arrival of pioneers from LDS Church was in the case of a few fur-trappers that traveled to the Utah Territory. James P. Beckwourth was a member of William Ashley's Rocky Mountain Fur Company, and spent several years off and on in Utah, especially in Cache Valley in the mid-1820s.

Jedediah Smith led several expeditions in the late 1820s to the Utah territory that involved African Americans Petre Ranne and Polette Labross.

In 1843, on John C. Fremont's second westward expedition (which included the Utah territory), a young free African American named Jacob Dodson accompanied him.

== Utah slavery and arrival of Latter-day Saint pioneers (1847–1862) ==
On July 22, 1847, pioneers from the LDS Church, led by Brigham Young, entered the Salt Lake Valley, fleeing Missouri and Illinois due to intense persecution. By the end of 1847, there were 12 African Americans living in the Salt Lake Valley, among them 8 slaves (including Oscar Crosby and Hark Lay), and a family of four free African Americans (Isaac and Jane Manning James family). Green Flake, who had also arrived with the initial pioneer company, had gone with a group of pioneers to help others traveling across the plains.

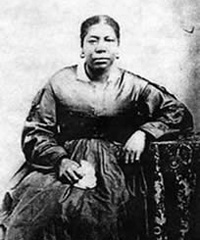
Jane Elizabeth Manning James, free African American and early Utah pioneer

By 1848 there were approximately 50 African Americans living in the Utah Territory after another pioneer company had arrived. 24 were slaves who had traveled from Mississippi led by John Brown, and they were joined by 12 other African Americans, mostly slaves, when they passed through Winter Quarters in Nebraska.

In the 1850 US census, there were 50 "colored" people living in the Utah Territory, constituting 0.4% of the total territorial population.

In the Compromise of 1850, the United States Congress established Utah as a slavery territory, officially legalizing slavery in the Utah territory.

In 1852, the Utah Legislature, with input from the prophet and territorial governor Brigham Young, established the Act in Relation to Service, which established a legal precedent for slavery in the territory (both for African Americans and Native Americans). These laws both protected the rights and proper treatment of the slaves while also legitimizing slavery and the slaves' duty to their masters. For example, it required that slaves be protected from unwilling transfer and sexual exploitation and be given proper treatment and schooling. On the other hand, slaves were required to submit dutifully to their masters' wishes and to punishment when necessary.

Under Utah territorial law (before the Reconstruction Amendments were passed), African Americans could not vote, serve on juries, be elected to the legislature, or serve in the militia.

On June 19, 1862, the US Congress abolished slavery in Utah and all other US territories.

== Post-slavery period (1862–1950) ==
=== Population and distribution ===
Census Data for African American Population in Utah from 1860 to 1950
Year	Total Population	African American Population	Percentage of Population
1860	40,273	59	0.15%
1870	86,786	118	0.14%
1880	143,963	232	0.16%
1890	207,905	588	0.28%
1900	276,749	672	0.25%
1910	373,351	1,144	0.31%
1920	449,396	1,446	0.32%
1930	507,847	1,108	0.22%
1940	550,310	1,235	0.22%
1950	676,909	2,729	0.40%

As shown in the table above, the historic population of African Americans in Utah has been proportionally low. During the late 1800s, the greatest population of African Americans was in Salt Lake City, followed by Uintah County due to the military presence, and Weber County due to the railroad center located in Ogden. Unlike other western African American populations in the time period where single African American men was the norm, African American Utahns in the late 19th and early 20th centuries were mostly organized into family units.

Until about 1870, most of the African American immigration to Utah was composed of converts to the LDS Church. After 1870, the majority of African American immigrants were immigrating for non-religious reasons. Despite this growth, the proportion of African Americans in Utah remained consistently low.

=== Industry ===
The United States Military and the arrival of the railroads in Utah were perhaps the two biggest pull factors and employers for African Americans in this time period. In 1900, the most common occupation for African Americans was soldier, and second was "servants and waiters", which included the large number who worked for railroad companies. Agriculture and mining were also common occupations at the time.

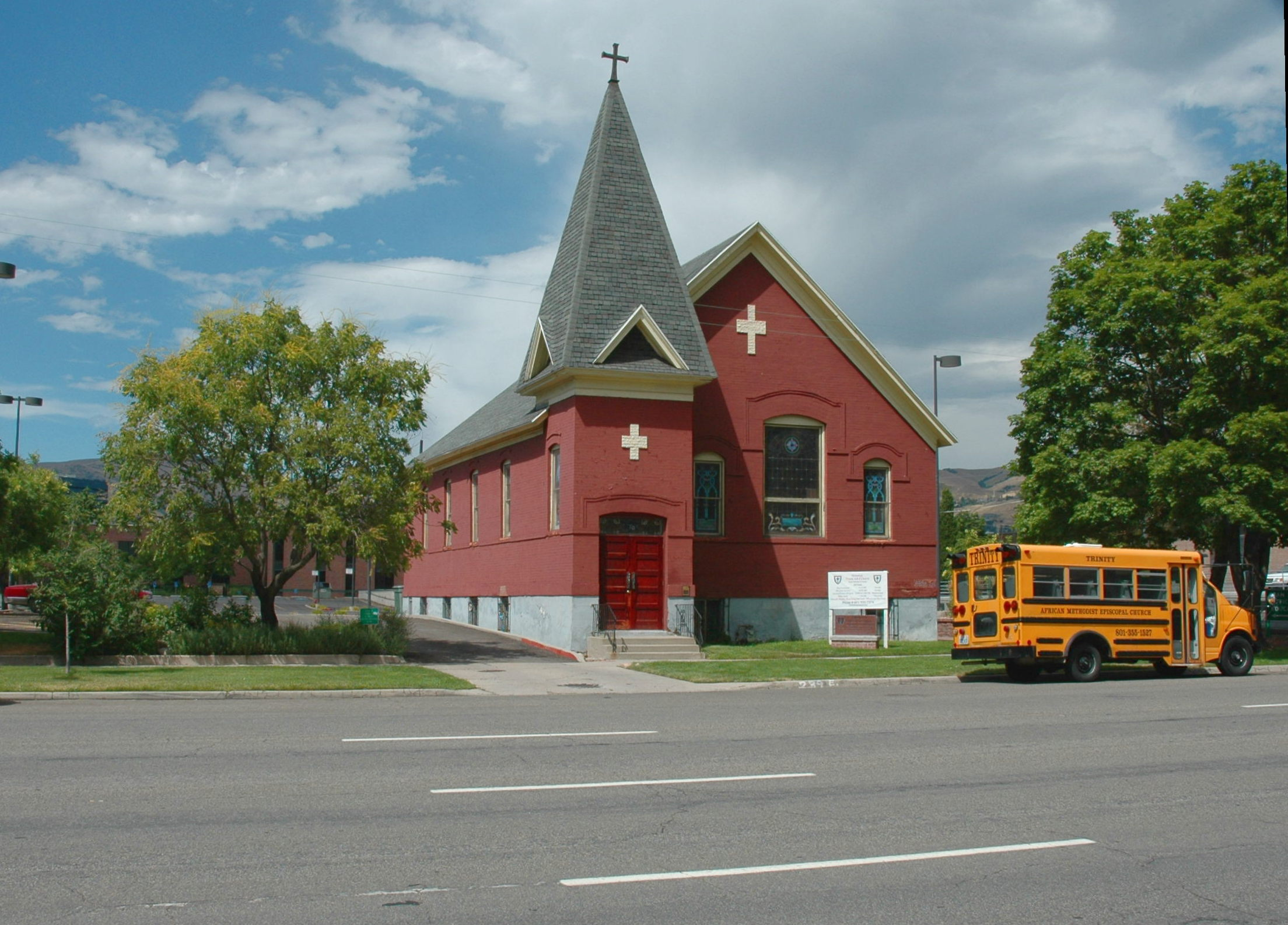
Trinity A.M.E. church in Salt Lake City

=== African American community ===
As the African American community grew with the insurgence of non-religious motivated pioneers in the late 1800s, and especially grouped in places like Salt Lake City and Ogden, African American media, organizations, and churches (besides the LDS Church) began to emerge in greater numbers. Between 1890 and 1891, the first African Methodist Episcopal church in Utah was established in Salt Lake and became a focal point for the local African American community. In the 1890s and early 1900s an African American Baptist church was established in Salt Lake.

=== African American military units ===
There were two notable segregated African American military units in Utah in the late 1800s: the Ninth Cavalry Regiment and the 24th Infantry Regiment, stationed in Fort Duchesne (Uintah County) and Salt Lake City respectively. They were sent initially to help in the Indian Wars and in other necessary capacities. These two units composed a sizable portion of the African American population of Utah in this time period, notably giving Uintah county the second-largest population of African Americans for a period of time.

Fort Duchesne was reportedly segregated, but soldier-to-soldier interactions were generally not separated by race.

=== Discrimination/segregation ===
The Utah Legislature passed an anti-miscegenation law in 1888 which prohibited marriage "between a negro and a white person".

Some of the segregation present in Utah emerged in the late 1890s as a direct result of the arrival of the 24th Infantry to Salt Lake. Shop owners were reportedly concerned about African American soldiers entering their shops and restaurants, and were prompted to put up signs expressing their racial preferences.

Utah Schools were not formally segregated.

== Desegregation and the civil rights movement (1950–1978) ==
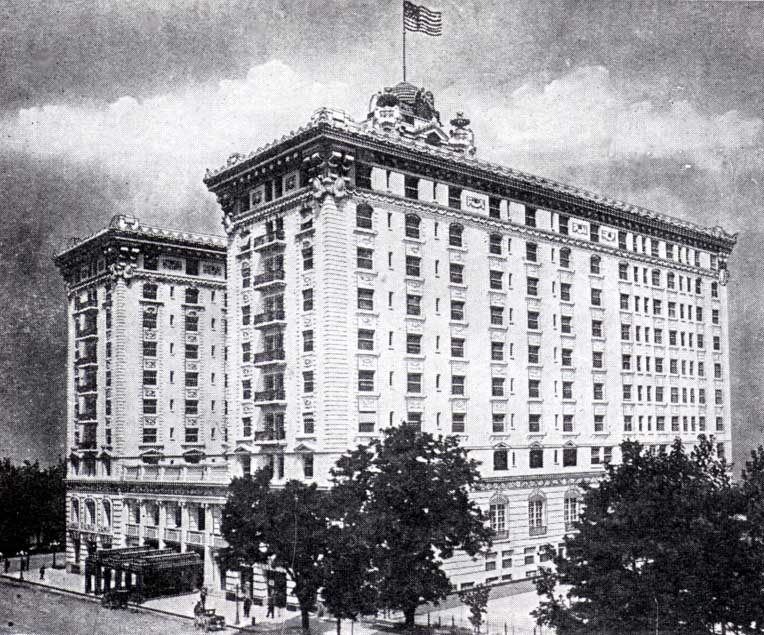
Hotel Utah, Salt Lake City, circa 1925

The early 1950s brought much-anticipated change to the Utah community of African Americans. Previously, many famous African Americans, including the opera singer Maria Anderson and other prominent musicians such as Paul Robeson, Harry Belafonte, Ella Fitzgerald, and Lionel Hampton, all faced discrimination as they visited Utah. The Hotel Utah required them to abstain from eating at the hotel restaurant and to use the freight elevator. Others were unable to find accommodation in the hotels. Multiple governmental authorities, including the American Ambassador to the United Nations, Ralph Bunche, and Congressman Adam Clayton Powell, were also rejected by the hotel, forcing them to seek lodging in private homes. Bars, night clubs, and many dining establishments in Salt Lake City refused service to African Americans. The practice of segregation quickly began to dissolve, with public attractions such as Lagoon, an amusement park in Farmington, allowing African Americans entry and use of the swimming pool and other park facilities.

On the brink of Brown v. Board of Education, Utah schools and universities tended to avoid hiring African American teachers, tending to favor whites for such positions. According to the NAACP, no African American had taught in the Utah education system until late 1954, when the first Black public school teacher was hired. Continued segregation existed not only in educational positions, but also in college sports until 1953, when the first Black football players were accepted onto the Utah State Agricultural College football team.

By 1960, the African American population in Utah had grown by more than 50% relative to 1950, with census data showing an overall African American population of 4,148 people, comprising 0.47% of Utah's total population. In 1963, Utah's 75-year ban on miscegenation was lifted, allowing interracial marriage. Utah was the second-to-last state to repeal its anti-miscegenation statute, with Wyoming repealing in 1965.

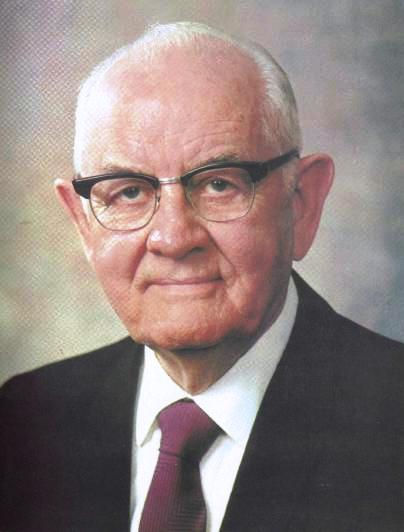
Spencer W. Kimball

A 1967 Daily Utah Chronicle interview with several African Americans in northern Utah provided insight into African-American views of racism and Utah's integration of civil rights policies. The interview reveals the African Americans, particularly youth, felt continued discouragement of interracial marriage, even after legalization, was wrong and unnecessary. Youth at West High School reported that they felt welcome and received fair treatment at school. Students at Ogden High School, however, complained about unfairness and prejudice from some teachers and principals. One woman felt offended at a realtor for not allowing her to look at house listings in predominantly white, middle-class East Salt Lake, taking her instead to the poor, dilapidated houses in West Salt Lake.

By 1970, the African-American population in Utah had grown to 6,324. The LDS Church continued withholding priesthood authority from African Americans, causing tension and criticism within the church. David O. McKay, President of the LDS Church, issued a letter to people struggling with confusion over the doctrine surrounding African Americans, stating resolutely that the time would come when African Americans would be given full rights in the church.

In June 1978, Spencer W. Kimball, then-president of the LDS Church issued Official Declaration 2, which affirmed the Church's belief in the equality of all men and ended the long-standing practice of withholding certain church privileges from African American members, such as holding the priesthood and entering temples.

== Modern day African-Americans (1978-today) ==
=== Population ===
Census Data for African American Population in Utah, 1980–2010
Year	Total Population	African American Population	Percentage of Population
1980	1,461,037	9,225	0.63%
1990	1,722,850	11,576	0.67%
2000	2,233,169	17,657	0.79%
2010	2,763,885	29,287	1.06%

African American population in Utah continued increasing at an accelerating rate, reaching just over 1% of the overall population during the 2010 census.

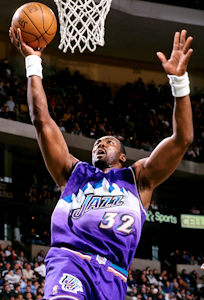
Karl Malone

=== Sports ===
Utah's college and professional sports scene includes hundreds of African American athletes, many of which receive great support from fans around the state. The roster for the Utah Jazz, an NBA franchise based in Salt Lake City, has recruited well-known African American players such as Karl Malone, Paul Millsap, Donovan Mitchell, Al Jefferson, Derrick Favors and Thurl Bailey, among many others.

Racism still serves as a form of denigration during sports rivalries in Utah. An interview with an African American basketball player at the University of Utah revealed that racial slurs are still commonly shouted out during and after sports matches. Attempts of physical violence after games were also reported by the student.

=== Religion ===
A 2009 Pew Forum study showed that approximately 3% of US members of the LDS Church, the predominant religion in Utah, were African American.

The Calvary Baptist Church, a well-known African American house of worship, has had a presence in Salt Lake City since 1898. Founded by a small group of African American women who gathered regularly to pray, the small group quickly expanded and moved from personal homes into a larger building. Reverend A. E. Reynolds was invited to act as the Calvary Baptist Church's first pastor and served for approximately three years. Membership continued to grow rapidly. Under the direction of Reverend France Davis, a new facility was constructed in 2001 for worship services. Each Sunday, around 300 African Americans gather at the Calvary Baptist Church to receive a free breakfast and hear Reverend Davis preach a sermon.

=== Modern racial issues ===
A 2013 study shows a large racial divide between East Salt Lake City and West Salt Lake City. The east is more affluent and is home to few African Americans and other minorities. The west, home to a much greater proportion of African Americans and other minorities, is a much more dilapidated, poverty-stricken area, with a 17.1% poverty rate according to the federally defined poverty line.

The Salt Lake City chapter of the National Association for the Advancement of Colored People (NAACP) claimed in 2017 to receive over 10 reports of racism weekly. Complaints include workplace unfairness, use of racial slurs, and threats of violence. Reports of racism are steadily increasing in the state.

== Notable residents ==
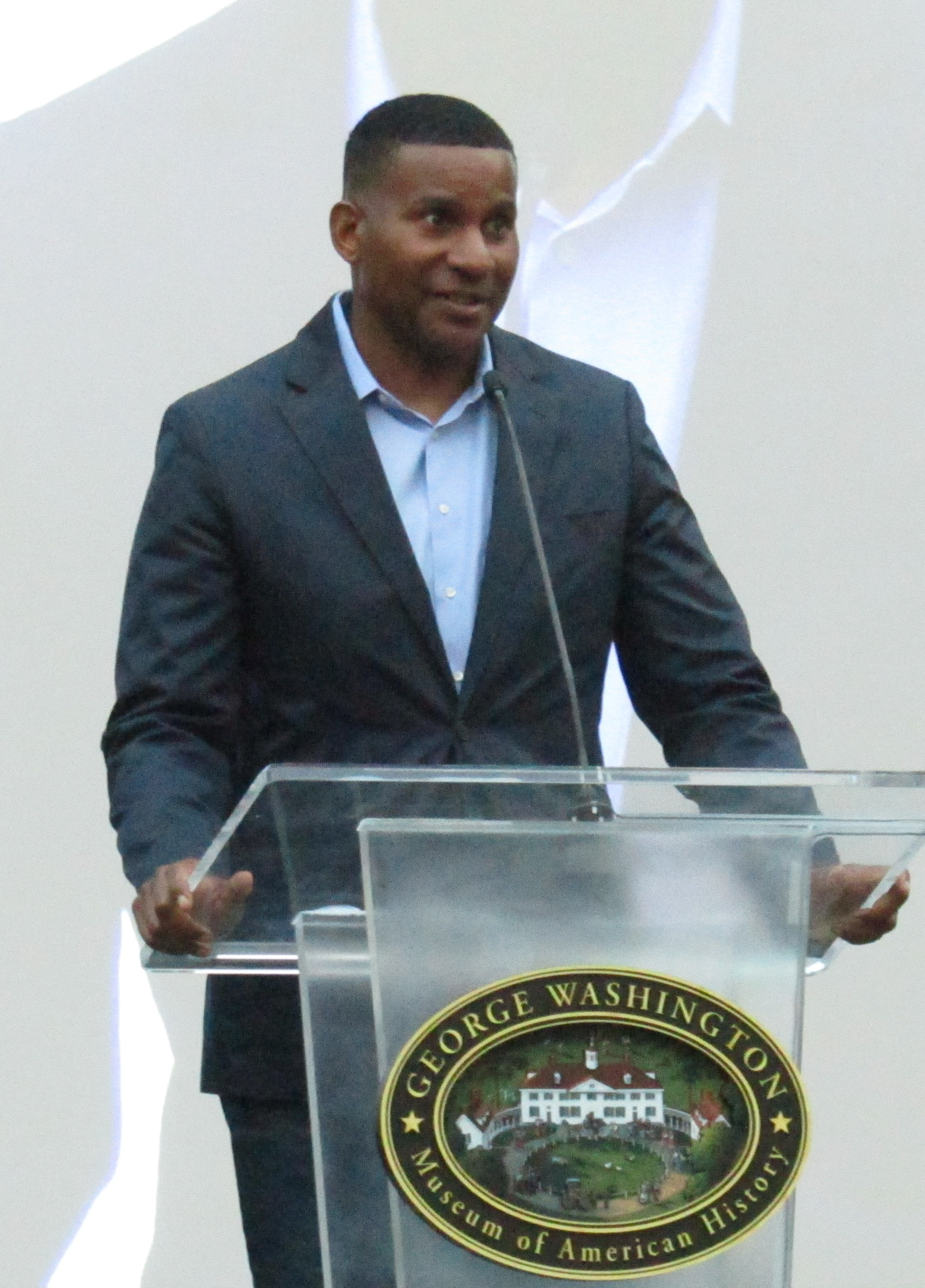
Alvin B. Jackson, Former Utah State Senator

=== Deceased ===
- James Beckwourth – fur trader and explorer
- Green Flake – pioneer
- Jane Manning James – pioneer
- Elijah Abel – carpenter and church leader
- Gobo Fango – pioneer
- Mia Love – US congresswoman
- William Grandstaff – cowboy, settler, and prospector; namesake of Grandstaff Canyon.
- Caleb Swanigan – NBA Basketball player

=== Living ===
- Joseph Freeman – first African American to receive the priesthood after the 1978 announcement by Spencer W. Kimball
- Wynetta Willis Martin – singer and BYU faculty member
- Thurl Bailey – NBA basketball player
- Byron Scott – NBA basketball coach and player
- Alex Boyé – singer and actor
- Skyler Higley— Comedy Writer, Standup Commedian and Podcast Host
- Alvin B. Jackson – state senator
- Frank Jackson – basketball player
- Bryan Kehl – NFL football player
- Karl Malone – NBA basketball player
- Sandra Hollins – Utah State Representative
- Manson Kafi – First black bar owner
- Youngboy Never Broke Again – American rapper
- Rio Cortez – American poet who grew up in Salt Lake; now based in Harlem
- Burgess Owens – football player and U.S. Congressman

== See also ==
- Black people and Mormonism
- Black Mormons
- History of Utah
- National and ethnic cultures of Utah
- Racial segregation of churches in the United States
- Demographics of Utah
- List of African-American newspapers in Utah
- Hispanics and Latinos in Utah
- Utah Italians
- History of Utah
