= Hispanics and Latinos in Utah =

People of Hispanic/Latino descent in the state of Utah

The state of Utah has an increasingly diverse population, home to hundreds of thousands of Hispanic/Latino people who share ancestry from Latin American countries. It is estimated that there are roughly 383,400 residents of Hispanic/Latino descent currently living in Utah.

== Brief history ==
=== Spanish explorers and Mexican beginnings ===
Possibly the first Spanish expedition into the lands now known as Utah was in 1541, captained by Garci-Lopez de Cardenas, and recorded by Francisco de Coronado. Utah was incorporated into the Province of Las Californias.

In 1776 the government of New Spain authorized friars Silvestre Velez de Escalante and Francisco Atanacio Dominguez to explore territory controlled by the Utes, now modern day Colorado, Utah, and northern New Mexico. Five Mexican Indians (or mestizos, men of mixed race of Spanish and indigenous descent) accompanied them “as guides, interpreters, and keepers of horses and mules.” The expedition aimed to find a route to connect Santa Fé and Monterey as well as to convert the Utes to Christianity. The Spaniards gave Spanish names to places they encountered that were later changed by the Mormon pioneers.

After Mexico’s war of independence against Spain started in 1810 and Mexico reclaimed all Spanish possessions (including the area controlled by the Utes), rivalry developed between Anglo-American traders in the area and Mexicans. After Mexico declared independence from Spain, the area officially became part of the Mexican territory and Mexicans were actively involved in Utah while making no threat to Ute claims on the land. This continued uninterrupted until 1847 and the arrival of the Mormons, followed by the United States annexation of the territory of Utah with the signing of the Treaty of Guadalupe Hidalgo in 1848.

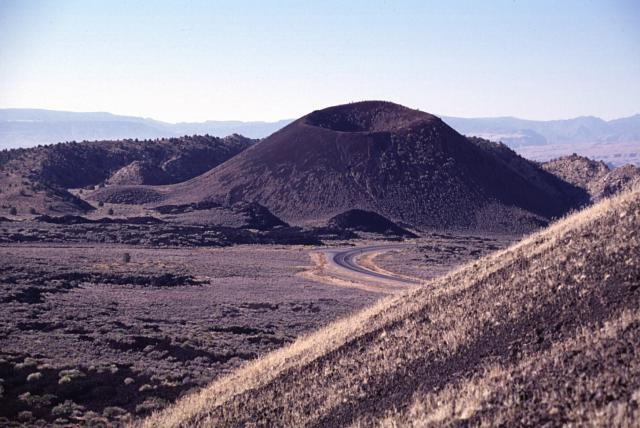
Santa Clara Volcano

=== Latin American immigration to Utah ===
Since its foundation in 1894, Carbon County attracted a diverse group of immigrants as sheepherders, railroad laborers, and coal miners. The Mexicans and the Mexican Americans continued to grow in numbers throughout the years. Hispanic presence at the end of the nineteenth century played an instrumental role in the development of cattle, sheep, and mining industries and in the irrigation systems of Utah.

In 1900 the United States Census listed only forty individuals of Mexican nativity living in Utah. Spanish-speaking families began to establish homes in Monticello, find employment at Bingham Copper Mine in the Salt Lake Valley, work in the Carbon County coal mines, and find their place in other locations in Utah as new economic opportunities emerged with World War I. In the 1910 Utah Census, there was a total of 199 Spanish-speaking people reported in the state. The 1910 Census reported 184 total people from Mexico living in Utah at the time The new century brought many Hispanic immigrants, often from Mexico escaping the Revolution of Mexico. Many immigrants settled in Weber County in Northern Utah during this time due to the abundance of railroad and mining jobs. Across the United States, Latino immigration boomed post-World War II. By 1980, the official count placed Hispanics at 4.1 percent of the population of the state, or 69,260 individuals.

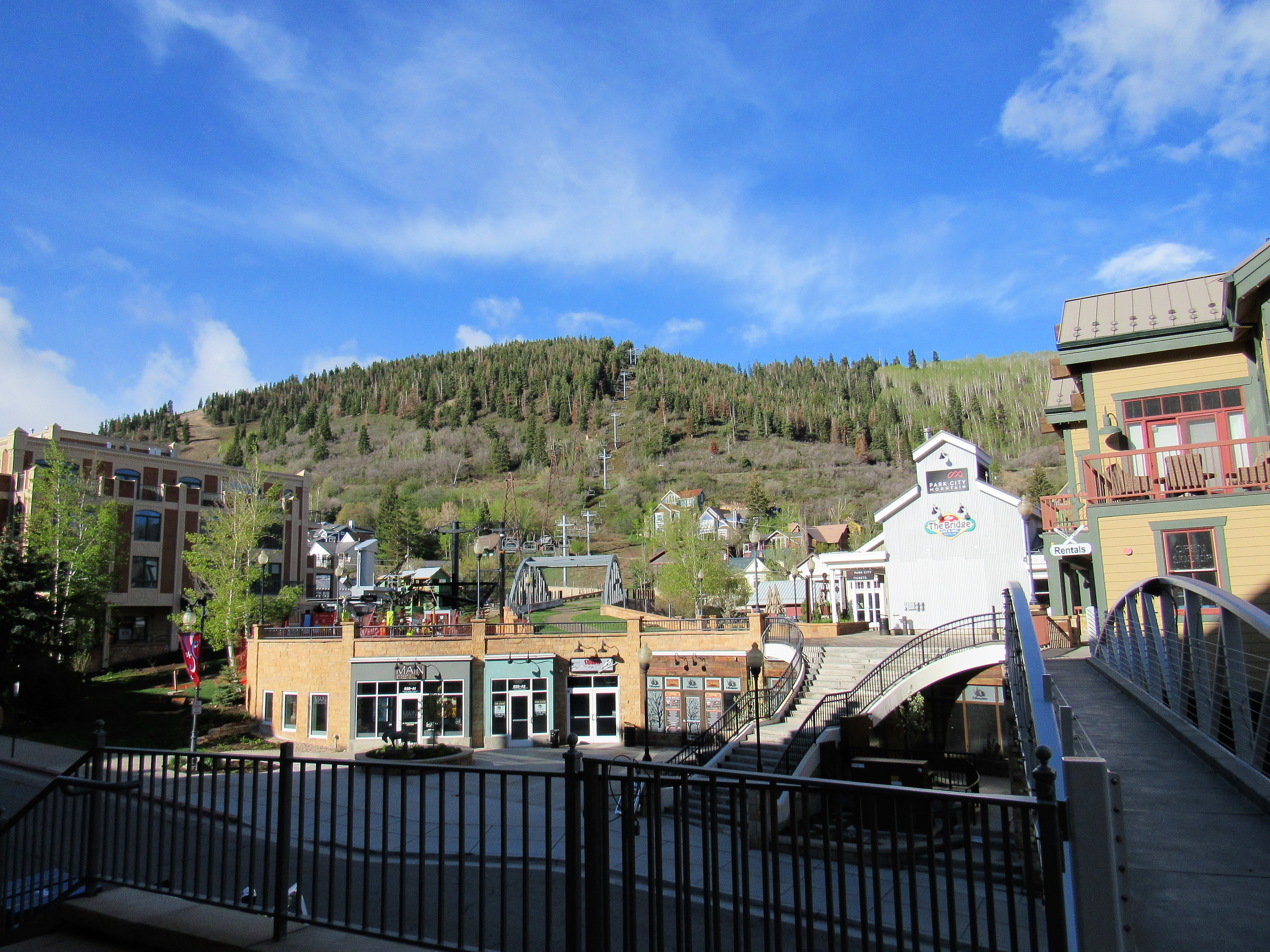
Park City, Utah which drew a Hispanic workforce in the 1990s

In the 1990s alone, the Latino population of Utah grew by 138 percent. A government focus on tourism in the towns of Park City, Wendover, and others in Utah caused a surge of new jobs that attracted a Hispanic population that would come to call these regions home. Some communities in northern Utah in the 1990s saw a 300 percent increase in Latino population. The lack of diversity in this immigration destination has increased a sense of racial-ethnic otherness that is not observed in more traditional immigrant destinations, that tend to be urban melting pots.

=== The Utah Compact ===
The Utah Compact is a document authored by various groups in early 2011, including businesses, religious organizations, and political leaders. It is a document detailing five principals regarding the discussion of immigration legislation in Utah. It was written following the implementation of new immigration policy in Arizona in 2010. Amongst the compact's supporters were groups from the agricultural industry, members of the Salt Lake Chamber of Commerce, a state 'conservative think tank', members of various churches, and a local Latino-focused organization. The Church of Jesus Christ of Latter-day Saints also expressed support for the compact, but did not sign it.

== Current Demographics ==
In 2021, the U.S. Census Bureau estimates the Hispanic/Latino population to be approximately 495,000, or 14.8% of the total population of 3.3 million. Just as the overall population of Utah is growing, the amount of Hispanics in Utah is also growing, and the Latino population is increasing at a higher rate than the white non-Latino population.

According to the 2010 Census, Utah ranks 11th in the United States for percent of Latino people per capita.

The Utah city with the most Hispanic residents in 2020 is West Valley City with over 51,000 Hispanic/Latino residents.

2016 Self-Reported demographics. Percentage of Utahns per county identifying as Hispanic

According to the Kem C Gardner Policy at the University of Utah and The United States Census Bureau, more of Utah’s Hispanic population is the result of reproduction in the United States rather than immigration from a Latin/Hispanic country. It is estimated that the Hispanic/Latino population in Utah accounts for 0.7% of the nation’s entire Hispanic population.

According to the 2010 census, Hispanics are majority in Beryl Junction (51.8%), Wendover (68.3%) and Hideout (77.0%).

=== Ancestries ===
(self-identified ethnicity, not by birthplace)
Ancestry by origin (2021 surveys)	Population	% (out of total Hispanic pop. in Utah)
Argentine	4,923	1
Bolivian	824	—
Chilean	6,952	1.4
Colombian	8,338	1.7
Costa Rican	1,422	—
Cuban	4,936	1
Dominican	5,326	1.1
Ecuadorian	3,110	0.63
Guatemalan	12,119	2.5
Honduran	3,359	0.68
Mexican	338,842	68.6
Nicaraguan	1,813	—
Panamanian	2,060	—
Paraguayan	1,911	—
Peruvian	13,609	2.6
Puerto Rican	11,341	2.3
Salvadoran	15,347	3.1
"Spanish"	19,706	4
"Spaniard"	14,627	3
"Spanish American"	427	—
Uruguayan	819	—
Venezuelan	18,326	1.2
All other	16050	3.3
Total	493,639	

Ancestry by region (2010 Census)	Number	%
Mexican	258,905	9.4%
Caribbean	10,397	0.4%
Central American	20,442	0.7%
South American	26,028	0.9%
Other Hispanic	42,568	1.5%
Total		

=== Utah Cities with Latino Population of at least 15% of total population ===
==== Salt Lake County ====
1. West Valley City- 38.14%
2. Midvale- 23.57%
3. Salt Lake City- 21.63%
4. Taylorsville- 23.11%
5. West Jordan-19.08%
6. South Salt Lake City- 16.27%

==== Weber County ====
1. Ogden- 32.47%
2. Roy- 16.41%
3. Riverdale- 15.01%
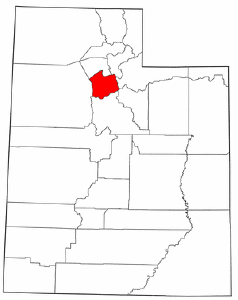
  Salt Lake County contains the highest population of Hispanic/Latin Utah residents per-capita

==== Utah County ====
1. Provo- 16.62%
2. Orem-16.54%
3. Springville- 15.59%
4. Santaquin- 15.12%

==== Summit County ====
1. Park City-18.25%

==== Davis County ====
1. Clearfield- 19.02%
2. Sunset- 18.07

==== Cache County ====
1. Hyrum- 17.01%
2. Logan- 15.44%

==== Wasatch County ====
1. Heber City-17.9%

Salt Lake County in northern Utah has the highest density of Latino people in the state of Utah.

== Latino Community in Utah ==
=== Utah Hispanic Chamber of Commerce ===
This community has created a space and web of Hispanic business people to allow for greater opportunities for job seekers and prospective employees of Latin Heritage in the state of Utah. Founded in 1991, the organization offers scholarships to local college students, recognizes prominent Hispanic business employees in the area, as well as hosting events to allow for networking between its members and specific career fields within the realm of business. Based upon holding a membership to the organization, members have access to helpful tools to help further their careers.

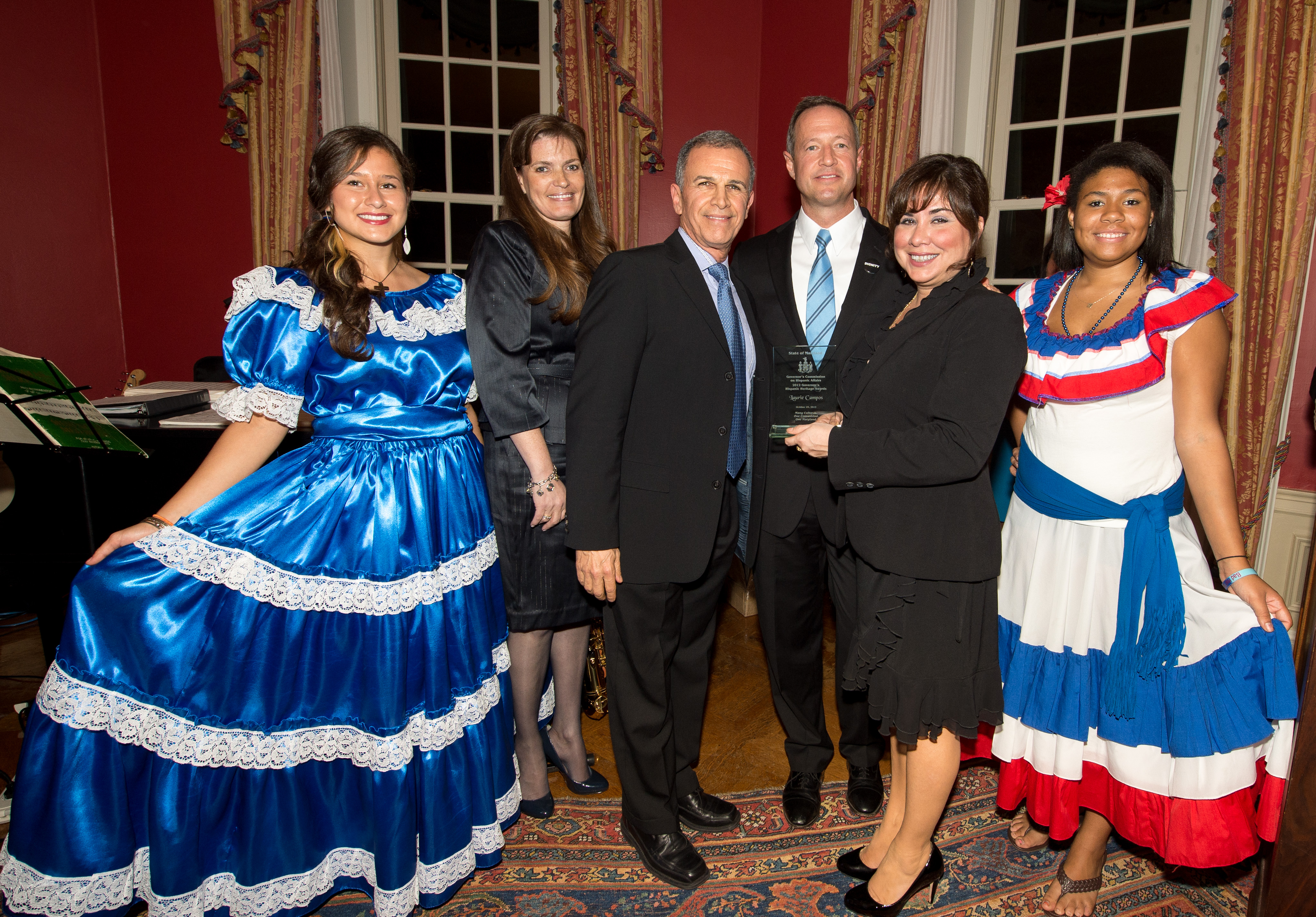

=== Panas in Utah, digital platform Latino ===
Since 2018 Panas in Utah, has become the means of communication for Latinos, it began after the Venezuelan migration to the state and now it reaches all the Hispanic communities in Utah, is affiliated with EFE the first Spanish news agency in the world with more than 80 years of experience and el pana en Utah, Frengy Alvarado has become a reference for news and information for the community

=== Cultural Events in Utah ===
==== Festival LatinoAmericano ====
The annual four-day festival of Festival LatinoAmericano during Labor Day weekend celebrates all things Latin culture from a variety of countries. It is located in downtown Provo, Utah. The festival features prominent speakers and entertainers, many ethnic food opportunities, as well as performances from local dance/music groups.

==== Midvale Cinco De Mayo ====
This annual festival in Midvale, Utah, established in 1988, celebrates the Mexican holiday Cinco de Mayo. This festival takes place the first weekend in May and offers many performers such as bailé folklorico (traditional dancing), mariachi bands, as well as known Hispanic singers and bands. The festival boasts a variety of local Mexican food vendors as well as activities such as bingo and inflatable bounce- houses for children to play in.

==== Utah Cultural Celebration Center ====
The Utah Cultural Celebration Center hosts an annual celebration and education of Mexican Holiday, día de los muertos, in West Valley City. The event takes place the weekend surrounding the holiday (October 31-November 2) and provides traditional means of celebrating the holiday featuring authentic Mexican music and dance, relevant arts and crafts for the family as well as a La Catarina dress up contest.

Día de los muertos at Thanksgiving Point

This annual one day celebration at Thanksgiving Point event center in Lehi, Utah provides an experience complete with traditional food, dance, storytelling, music, as well as a community altar (ofrenda) to pay tribute to deceased loved ones.

==== Hispanic Heritage Festival ====
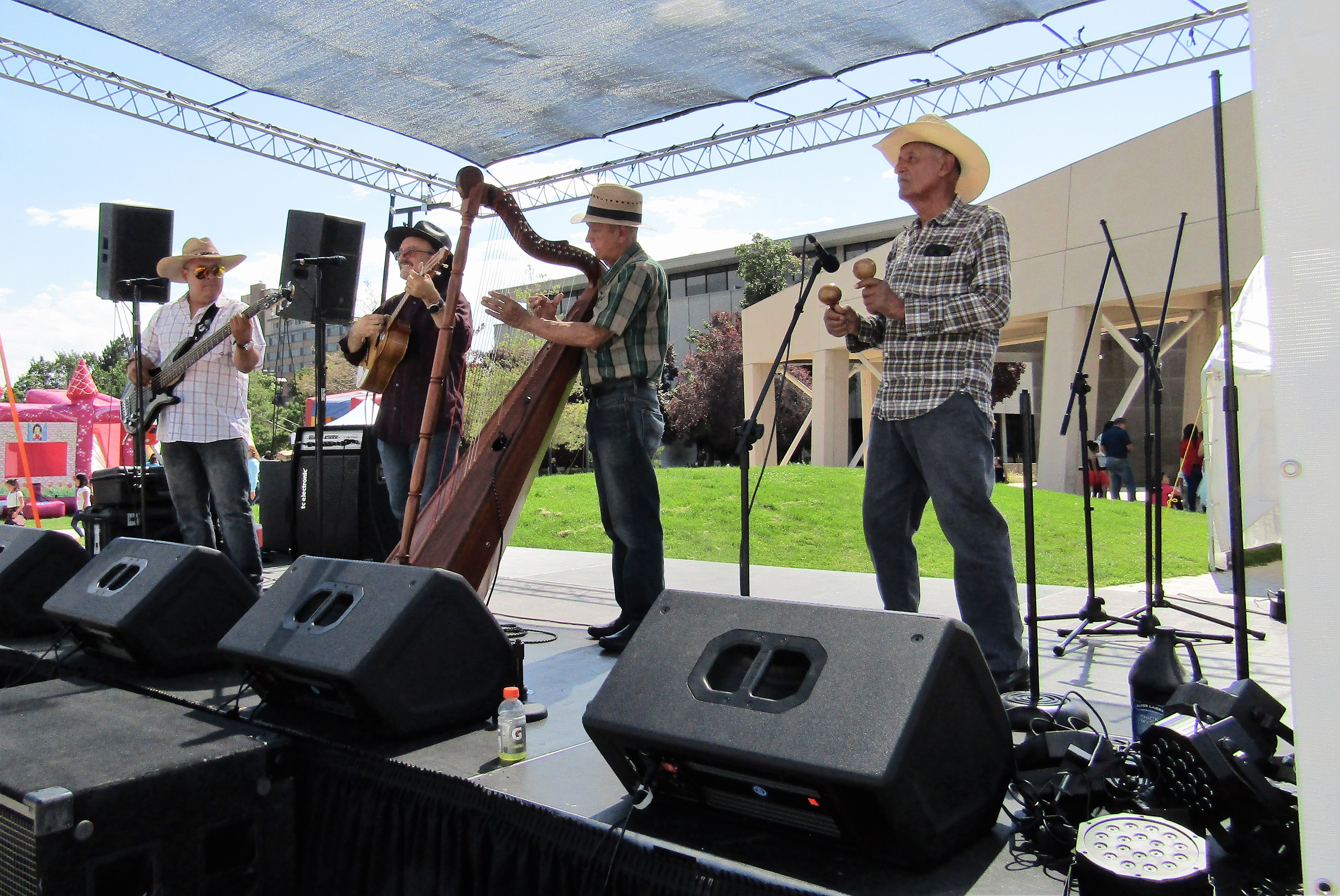
Venezuelan band performing at event in Salt Lake City, Utah

This festival is an annual two-day event located at the Gateway shopping center in downtown Salt Lake City. The event contains a parade with cultural dancers, musicians as well as small floats. There is also a street fair with vendors selling cultural Latin cuisine as well as homemade cultural items. The street fair offers a variety of booths, family activities and crafts, and live music.

== Historic Hispanic/Latino population (1900–2020) ==
Utah	Number of people of Mexican Origin (1900-1930) and of Hispanic/Latino Origin (1940-2020) in Utah^{[a]}	+% of Population of Mexican Origin (1900-1930) and of Hispanic/Latino Origin (1940-2020) in Utah
1900	40 (Spanish speakers)	0.0%
1910	199 (Spanish Americans)	0.0%
1920	1,348 - 1,666	0.3%
1930	4,062	0.8%
1940	2,572	0.5%
1950	N/A	N/A
1960	N/A	N/A
1970	43,550 (15% sample)	4.1%
1980	60,302	4.1%
1990	84,597	4.9%
2000	201,559	9.0%
2010	358,340	13.0%
2020	492,912	15.1%

== Legacy ==
=== Current Spanish place names ===
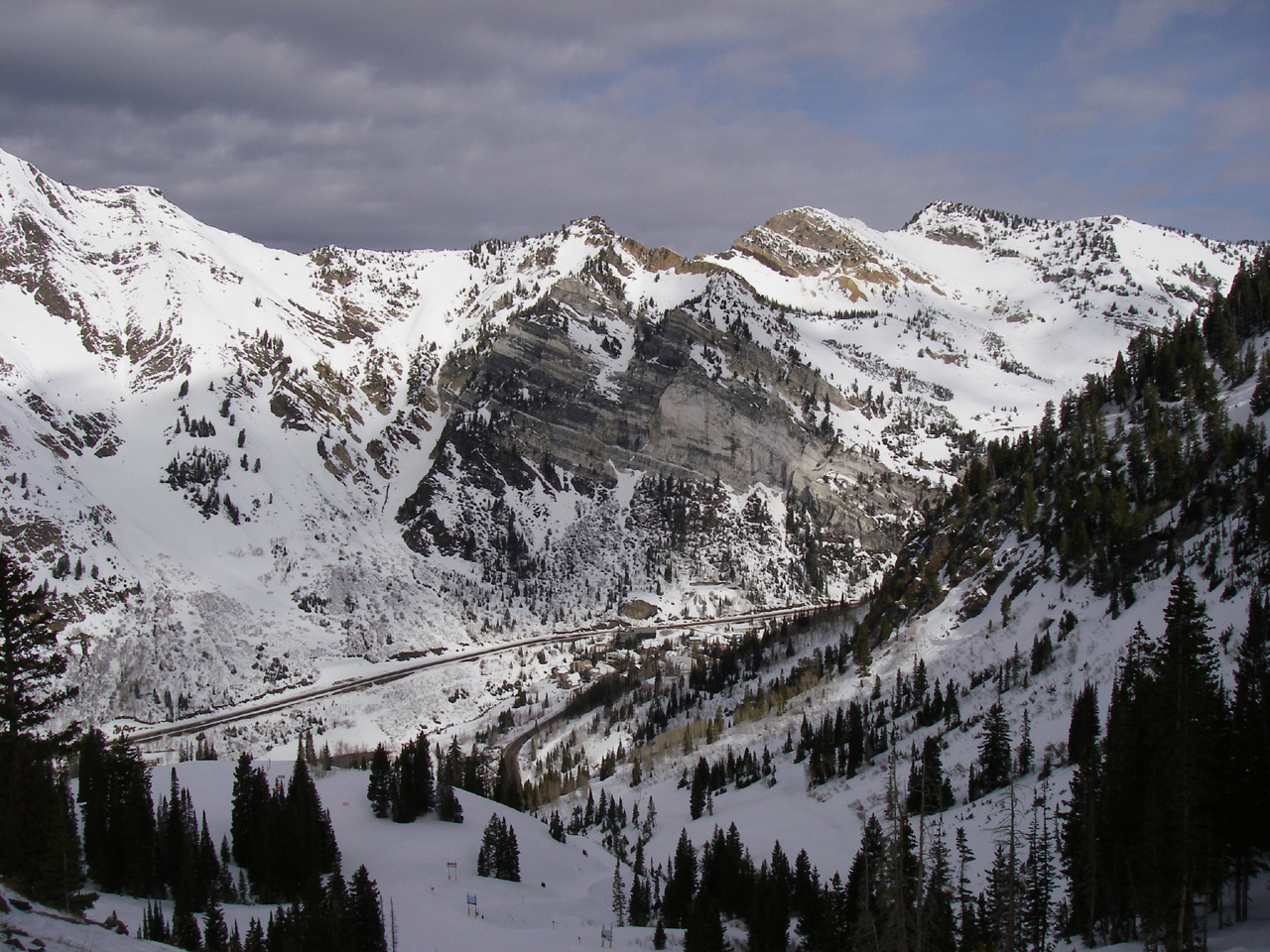
Alta, Utah

San Juan County ( St John in Spanish), Escalante (Spanish surname), Santa Clara (Saint Clare de Assisi), Alta (high in Spanish), Pintura (painting in Spanish), Santa Clara Volcano, Callao Ghost Town (named for a town in Peru), Santa Clara River.

== Influential Latinos in Utah ==
=== Senators ===
Luz Escamilla- Democrat- District 1 Since January 2009.

Ross Romero-Democrat- District 7 2006-2012

Pete Suazo- 1996-2001- Democrat- First Latino Senator to be elected to the Utah State Senate

==== Representatives ====
Rebecca Chavez-Houck- Democrat- District 24. 2008-2018

Angela Romero- Democrat- District 26 since 2013

=== Other Elected Officials ===
Arlene Anderson - Ogden School Board, District 1 since 2021.

Silivia Catten - Millcreek City Council, District 1 since 2018.

Joél-Léhi Organista - Salt Lake City School Board, District 1 since 2021.

Nate Salazar - Salt Lake City School Board, District 4 since 2019.

Ana Valdemoros - Salt Lake City Council, District 4 since 2019.

Silvia Stubbs - San Juan County Commissioner, District 2 since 2023

=== Celebrities ===
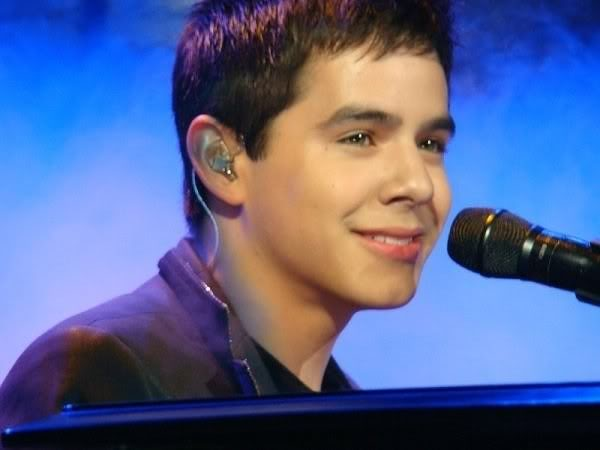
Latino Utah native, David Archuleta performing

David Archuleta- Singer/Songwriter, appearing on American Talent Contest, American Idol

=== Athletes ===
Julian Vazquez- Professional Soccer player for Real Salt Lake

Long Guitierrez Feng- Swimmer 2016 Rio de Janeiro Olympics

Emil Cuello- Professional Soccer Player for the LA Galaxy

Jared Fernandez- Former MLB Pitcher for the Cincinnati Reds, Houston Astros, and Milwaukee Brewers
