= Gobo Fango =

Gobo Fango (ca. 1855 – 1886) was a South African Xhosa who emigrated to the United States with a white Latter-day Saint family in 1861. While he never joined The Church of Jesus Christ of Latter-day Saints (LDS Church), he was one of the most prominent people of African descent in nineteenth-century Utah. He was murdered in a confrontation with white cowboys in Idaho in 1886.

== Early life ==
Gobo Fango was born near the Eastern Cape Colony of South Africa following the Eighth Cape Frontier War in 1855. The War began when Dutch settlers introduced cattle disease to South Africa which led to a famine. A Xhosa priestess named Nongqawuse promised the Xhosa that if they killed all of their cattle that they would be resurrected and multiplied, providing more food and labor for South Africans. The prophecy failed and multiplied the famine. Fango's mother, whose name is not known, died in the famine.

A white family who belonged to the LDS Church, Henry and Ruth Talbot, found Fango on their property. According to Talbot family tradition, the Talbots adopted him. Other records suggest he was a servant. Fango was never baptized as a Latter-day Saint.

== Life in Utah ==
On February 20, 1861, the Talbots and other Latter-day Saints boarded the ship Race Horse from Port Elizabeth, South Africa to begin their journey to Utah, where they planned to gather with other Latter-day Saints. They smuggled him onto the Race Horse inside a carpet or inside of a box. Once in the United States, they continued to conceal that they were traveling with a Black child.

The Talbots and Fango settled in Kaysville in 1861. Fango worked as a laborer for the family. His feet froze one year and had part of one of his feet removed. He later left the Talbots and worked for the Mary Ann Whitesides Hunter of Grantsville, Utah.

== Life and death in Idaho ==
Gobo Fango moved to the Goose Creek Valley of Idaho Territory by the early 1880s where he worked as a sheepherder and became a business partner with Walter Matthews and Edward Hunter. In 1886 Fango became embroiled in a land dispute over grazing lands. Consequently, a cowboy named Franke Bedke accused Fango of trespassing and attempted to force him to leave the valley. After a verbal confrontation, Bedke shot Fango and left him for dead. Fango walked more than a mile seeking medical help. He left $200 to impoverished citizens of Grantsville and smaller donations to members of the Hunter family. He left $500, half of his net worth, to the Salt Lake City Temple Construction Fund.

Fango's grave is located in the Oakley, Idaho city cemetery.
