= Utah Jazz all-time roster =

List of basketball players for the Jazz

The following is a list of players, both past and current, who have appeared at least in one game for the New Orleans/Utah Jazz NBA basketball franchise.

== Players ==
Note: Statistics are correct through the end of the 2025–26 season.

G	Guard	G/F	Guard-forward	F	Forward	F/C	Forward-center	C	Center

legend
^	Denotes player who has been inducted to the Naismith Memorial Basketball Hall of Fame
*	Denotes player who has been selected for at least one All-Star Game with the Utah Jazz and is currently on the team roster
^{+}	Denotes player who has been selected for at least one All-Star Game with the Utah Jazz
^{x}	Denotes player who is currently on the Utah Jazz roster
0.0	Denotes the Utah Jazz statistics leader (min. 100 games played for the team for per-game statistics)

=== A to B ===
All-time roster
Player	Pos.	Pre-draft team	Yrs	Seasons	Statistics									Ref.
Player	Pos.	Pre-draft team	Yrs	Seasons	GP	MP	REB	AST	PTS	MPG	RPG	APG	PPG	Ref.
Rick Adelman	G	Loyola Marymount	1	1974–1975	28	613	55	69	175	21.9	2.0	2.5	6.3	
Ochai Agbaji	G	Kansas	2	2022–2024	110	2,212	247	114	741	20.1	2.2	1.0	6.7	
Blake Ahearn	G	Missouri State	1	2011–2012	4	30	2	1	10	7.5	0.5	0.3	2.5	
Nickeil Alexander-Walker	G	Virginia Tech	2	2021–2023	51	677	82	93	281	13.3	1.6	1.8	5.5	
Grayson Allen	G	Duke	1	2018–2019	38	416	23	25	211	10.9	0.6	0.7	5.6	
Morris Almond	G	Rice	2	2007–2009	34	294	38	10	105	8.6	1.1	0.3	3.1	
John Amaechi	F/C	Penn State	2	2001–2003	104	1,060	186	50	274	10.2	1.8	0.5	2.6	
Lou Amundson	F/C	UNLV	1	2006–2007	1	2	0	0	0	2.0	0.0	0.0	0.0	
J. J. Anderson	F	Bradley	3	1982–1985	144	1,922	427	109	734	13.3	3.0	0.8	5.1	
Kyle Anderson	F	UCLA	1	2025–2026	20	401	66	61	142	20.1	3.3	3.1	7.1	
Shandon Anderson	G/F	Georgia	3	1996–1999	197	3,740	538	194	1,494	19.0	2.7	1.0	7.6	
Rafael Araújo	C	BYU	1	2006–2007	28	248	66	10	72	8.9	2.4	0.4	2.6	
Carlos Arroyo	G	FIU	3	2002–2005	145	3,037	257	560	1,264	20.9	1.8	3.9	8.7	
Isaac Austin	C	Arizona State	2	1991–1993	77	418	114	11	190	5.4	1.5	0.1	2.5	
Anthony Avent	F	Seton Hall	1	1998–1999	5	44	12	1	9	8.8	2.4	0.2	1.8	
Udoka Azubuike	C	Kansas	3	2020–2023	68	611	203	11	221	9.0	3.0	0.2	3.3	
Ace Bailey^{x}	F	Rutgers	1	2025–2026	72	1,988	302	131	993	27.6	4.2	1.8	13.8	
Gus Bailey	G/F	UTEP	2	1977–1979	50	458	84	42	159	9.2	1.7	0.8	3.2	
Thurl Bailey	F/C	NC State	10	1983–1992; 1998–1999	708	20,523	3,881	1,124	9,897	29.0	5.5	1.6	14.0	
Mo Bamba	C	Texas	1	2025–2026	2	38	20	1	10	19.0	10.0	0.5	5.0	
Jim Barnett	G/F	Oregon	1	1974–1975	45	1,238	128	137	586	27.5	2.8	3.0	13.0	
Darius Bazley	F/C	Princeton High School, OH	1	2023–2024	6	142	27	5	48	23.7	4.5	0.8	8.0	
Malik Beasley	G	Florida State	1	2022–2023	55	1,472	197	93	736	26.8	3.6	1.7	13.4	
Ron Behagen	F/C	Minnesota	2	1975–1977	126	2,903	984	222	1,276	23.0	7.8	1.8	10.1	
Raja Bell	G	FIU	4	2003–2005; 2010–2012	247	6,703	667	354	2,445	27.1	2.7	1.4	9.9	
Walt Bellamy^	C	Indiana	1	1974–1975	1	14	5	0	6	14.0	5.0	0.0	6.0	
Jerrelle Benimon	F	Towson	1	2014–2015	2	3	3	0	0	1.5	1.5	0.0	0.0	
Mel Bennett	F	Pittsburgh	1	1980–1981	28	313	93	15	105	11.2	3.3	0.5	3.8	
David Benoit	F	Alabama	6	1991–1996; 2000–2001	415	8,191	1,780	262	3,035	19.7	4.3	0.6	7.3	
Kent Benson	C	Indiana	1	1986–1987	73	895	231	39	329	12.3	3.2	0.5	4.5	
Henry Bibby	G	UCLA	2	1974–1976	107	2,296	229	301	982	21.5	2.1	2.8	9.2	
Andris Biedriņš	C	(Latvia) BK Skonto	1	2013–2014	6	45	17	0	3	7.5	2.8	0.0	0.5	
John Block	F/C	USC	1	1974–1975	4	57	18	7	27	14.3	4.5	1.8	6.8	
Bojan Bogdanović	G/F	(Croatia) Cibona	3	2019–2022	204	6,430	836	387	3,748	31.5	4.1	1.9	18.4	
Leandro Bolmaro	F	(Spain) FC Barcelona Bàsquet	1	2022–2023	14	68	7	7	6	4.9	0.5	0.5	0.4	
Joel Bolomboy	F	Weber State	1	2016–2017	12	53	17	2	22	4.4	1.4	0.2	1.8	
Walter Bond	G	Minnesota	2	1993–1995	74	798	88	48	273	10.8	1.2	0.6	3.7	
Trevor Booker	F	Clemson	2	2014–2016	158	3,196	849	167	1,030	20.2	5.4	1.1	6.5	
Ron Boone	G/F	Idaho State	2	1979–1981	127	3,432	300	463	1,376	27.0	2.4	3.6	10.8	
Carlos Boozer^{+}	F/C	Duke	6	2004–2010	354	12,051	3,712	1,012	6,821	34.0	10.5	2.9	19.3	
Curtis Borchardt	C	Stanford	2	2003–2005	83	1,117	278	64	258	13.5	3.3	0.8	3.1	
Tom Boswell	F/C	South Carolina	2	1979–1980; 1983–1984	99	1,816	392	131	773	18.3	4.0	1.3	7.8	
Fred Boyd	G	Oregon State	3	1975–1978	98	2,159	139	273	741	22.0	1.4	2.8	7.6	
Ken Boyd	F	Boston University	1	1974–1975	6	25	5	2	19	4.2	0.8	0.3	3.2	
Tony Bradley	C	North Carolina	3	2017–2020	70	728	293	25	310	10.4	4.2	0.4	4.4	
Jarrell Brantley	F	Charleston	3	2019–2021; 2022–2023	41	273	53	29	110	6.7	1.3	0.7	2.7	
Ronnie Brewer	G/F	Arkansas	4	2006–2010	266	7,030	773	488	2,786	26.4	2.9	1.8	10.5	
Allan Bristow	G/F	Virginia Tech	2	1979–1981	164	4,305	942	724	1,666	26.3	5.7	4.4	10.2	
Dee Brown	G	Illinois	1	2006–2007	49	450	40	83	94	9.2	0.8	1.7	1.9	
Devin Brown	G	UTSA	1	2005–2006	81	1,711	207	104	611	21.1	2.6	1.3	7.5	
John Brown	F	Missouri	1	1979–1980	4	24	9	4	4	6.0	2.3	1.0	1.0	
Mike Brown	F/C	George Washington	5	1988–1993	394	7,173	1,835	282	2,299	18.2	4.7	0.7	5.8	
Raymond Brown	F	Idaho	1	1989–1990	16	56	15	4	16	3.5	0.9	0.3	1.0	
Tony Brown	G/F	Arkansas	1	1990–1991	23	267	39	13	78	11.6	1.7	0.6	3.4	
Trey Burke	G	Michigan	3	2013–2016	210	5,916	524	872	2,547	28.2	2.5	4.2	12.1	
Alec Burks	G	Colorado	8	2011–2019	382	7,946	1,096	621	3,671	20.8	2.9	1.6	9.6	
Jared Butler	G	Baylor	1	2021–2022	42	360	45	63	161	8.6	1.1	1.5	3.8	
Marty Byrnes	F	Syracuse	1	1978–1979	36	530	94	43	189	14.7	2.6	1.2	5.3	

=== C ===
All-time roster
Player	Pos.	Pre-draft team	Yrs	Seasons	Statistics									Ref.
Player	Pos.	Pre-draft team	Yrs	Seasons	GP	MP	REB	AST	PTS	MPG	RPG	APG	PPG	Ref.
Mack Calvin	G	USC	1	1979–1980	48	772	84	134	306	16.1	1.8	2.8	6.4	
Antoine Carr	F/C	Wichita State	4	1994–1998	306	5,755	791	263	2,307	18.8	2.6	0.9	7.5	
DeMarre Carroll	F	Missouri	2	2011–2013	86	1,438	238	76	488	16.7	2.8	0.9	5.7	
Bobby Cattage	F	Auburn	1	1981–1982	49	337	73	7	150	6.9	1.5	0.1	3.1	
Tyler Cavanaugh	F	George Washington	1	2018–2019	11	39	8	1	9	3.5	0.7	0.1	0.8	
Tom Chambers	F/C	Utah	2	1993–1995	161	3,078	539	152	1,396	19.1	3.3	0.9	8.7	
Kennedy Chandler^{x}	G	Tennessee	1	2025–2026	11	355	37	74	165	32.3	3.4	6.7	15.0	
Calbert Cheaney	G/F	Indiana	1	2002–2003	81	2,351	284	163	700	29.0	3.5	2.0	8.6	
Zylan Cheatham	F	Arizona State	1	2021–2022	1	5	0	0	0	5.0	0.0	0.0	0.0	
Pete Chilcutt	F/C	North Carolina	1	1999–2000	26	224	43	10	47	8.6	1.7	0.4	1.8	
Patrick Christopher	G/F	California	1	2014–2015	4	29	6	0	6	7.3	1.5	0.0	1.5	
Ian Clark	G	Belmont	2	2013–2015	46	333	32	25	112	7.2	0.7	0.5	2.4	
Keon Clark	F/C	UNLV	1	2003–2004	2	27	7	1	4	13.5	3.5	0.5	2.0	
Jordan Clarkson	G	Missouri	6	2019–2025	342	9,630	1,217	1,113	5,985	28.2	3.6	3.3	17.5	
Walter Clayton Jr.	G	Florida	1	2025–2026	45	811	88	143	306	18.0	2.0	3.2	6.8	
E. C. Coleman	F	Houston Baptist	3	1974–1977	221	6,395	1,516	295	1,775	28.9	6.9	1.3	8.0	
Isaiah Collier^{x}	G	USC	2	2024–2026	130	3,356	385	869	1,303	25.8	3.0	6.7	10.0	
Jarron Collins	F/C	Stanford	8	2001–2009	480	8,100	1,493	411	2,042	16.9	3.1	0.9	4.3	
John Collins	F	Wake Forest	2	2023–2025	108	3,121	902	157	1,785	28.9	8.4	1.5	16.5	
Mike Conley^{+}	G	Ohio State	4	2019–2023	213	6,195	652	1,228	2,949	29.1	3.1	5.8	13.8	
Jeff Cook	F/C	Idaho State	1	1985–1986	2	17	5	0	7	8.5	2.5	0.0	3.5	
Jack Cooley	F/C	Notre Dame	1	2014–2015	16	87	25	1	27	5.4	1.6	0.1	1.7	
Wayne Cooper	F/C	New Orleans	1	1980–1981	71	1,420	440	52	489	20.0	6.2	0.7	6.9	
Tyrone Corbin	G/F	DePaul	3	1991–1994	233	6,567	1,311	402	2,231	28.2	5.6	1.7	9.6	
Bryce Cotton	G	Providence	1	2014–2015	15	159	18	15	80	10.6	1.2	1.0	5.3	
Mel Counts	F/C	Oregon State	2	1974–1976	105	1,740	541	220	610	16.6	5.2	2.1	5.8	
Marcus Cousin	C	Houston	1	2010–2011	4	18	3	0	4	4.5	0.8	0.0	1.0	
John Crotty	G	Virginia	5	1992–1995; 2000–2002	237	2,641	248	512	878	11.1	1.0	2.2	3.7	
Corey Crowder	G/F	Kentucky Wesleyan	1	1991–1992	51	328	41	17	114	6.4	0.8	0.3	2.2	
Jae Crowder	F	Marquette	2	2017–2019	107	2,910	486	174	1,270	27.2	4.5	1.6	11.9	
Pat Cummings	F/C	Cincinnati	1	1990–1991	4	26	5	0	15	6.5	1.3	0.0	3.8	
William Cunningham	C	Temple	1	1997–1998	6	38	8	1	8	6.3	1.3	0.2	1.3	
Dell Curry	G	Virginia Tech	1	1986–1987	67	636	78	58	325	9.5	1.2	0.9	4.9	

=== D to F ===
All-time roster
Player	Pos.	Pre-draft team	Yrs	Seasons	Statistics									Ref.
Player	Pos.	Pre-draft team	Yrs	Seasons	GP	MP	REB	AST	PTS	MPG	RPG	APG	PPG	Ref.
Adrian Dantley (#4)^	G/F	Notre Dame	7	1979–1986	461	17,899	2,845	1,702	13,635	38.8	6.2	3.7	29.6	
Brad Davis	G	Maryland	1	1979–1980	13	225	15	45	76	17.3	1.2	3.5	5.8	
Ed Davis	F	North Carolina	1	2019–2020	28	303	105	12	51	10.8	3.8	0.4	1.8	
Darryl Dawkins	C	Maynard Evans HS (FL)	1	1987–1988	4	26	5	1	6	6.5	1.3	0.3	1.5	
Paul Dawkins	F	Northern Illinois	1	1979–1980	57	776	125	77	316	13.6	2.2	1.4	5.5	
Greg Deane	G	Utah	1	1979–1980	7	48	6	6	10	6.9	0.9	0.9	1.4	
Boris Diaw	F/C	(France) Élan Béarnais	1	2016–2017	73	1,283	158	170	338	17.6	2.2	2.3	4.6	
James Donaldson	C	Washington State	2	1992–1993; 1994–1995	49	707	136	15	131	14.4	2.8	0.3	2.7	
John Drew	G/F	Gardner–Webb	3	1982–1985	144	3,466	655	267	2,670	24.1	4.5	1.9	18.5	
Kris Dunn	G	Providence	2	2022–2024	88	1,817	289	378	647	20.6	3.3	4.3	7.4	
John Duren	G	Georgetown	2	1980–1982	119	1,514	119	211	343	12.7	1.0	1.8	2.9	
Mark Eaton (#53)^{+}	C	UCLA	11	1982–1993	875	25,169	6,939	840	5,216	28.8	7.9	1.0	6.0	
Jerry Eaves	G	Louisville	2	1982–1984	162	2,622	207	410	1,117	16.2	1.3	2.5	6.9	
Blue Edwards	G/F	East Carolina	4	1989–1992; 1994–1995	261	6,388	815	420	2,560	24.5	3.1	1.6	9.8	
Howard Eisley	G	Boston College	6	1995–2000; 2004–2005	435	8,332	682	1,472	2,779	19.2	1.6	3.4	6.4	
Francisco Elson	C	California	1	2010–2011	62	610	115	33	134	9.8	1.9	0.5	2.2	
Drew Eubanks	C	Oregon State	1	2024–2025	37	568	168	45	215	15.4	4.5	1.2	5.8	
Jeremy Evans	F	Western Kentucky	5	2010–2015	219	2,370	586	105	806	10.8	2.7	0.5	3.7	
Dante Exum	G	(Australia) Lake Ginninderra College	5	2014–2015; 2016–2020	215	4,027	369	469	1,231	18.7	1.7	2.2	5.7	
Jim Farmer	G	Alabama	1	1988–1989	37	412	55	28	152	11.1	1.5	0.8	4.1	
Derrick Favors	F/C	Georgia Tech	10	2010–2019; 2020–2021	644	16,215	4,626	724	7,336	25.2	7.2	1.1	11.4	
Kyrylo Fesenko	C	(Ukraine) Cherkaski Mavpy	4	2007–2011	132	1,090	260	39	297	8.3	2.0	0.3	2.3	
Kyle Filipowski^{x}	C	Duke	2	2024–2026	149	3,323	992	338	1,569	22.3	6.7	2.3	10.5	
Derek Fisher	G	Little Rock	1	2006–2007	82	2,287	149	274	826	27.9	1.8	3.3	10.1	
Malik Fitts	F	St. Mary's (TX)	1	2021–2022	7	35	10	0	6	5.0	1.4	0.0	0.9	
Simone Fontecchio	F	(Spain) Saski Baskonia	2	2022–2024	102	1,926	262	115	773	18.9	2.6	1.1	7.6	
Trent Forrest	G	Florida State	2	2020–2022	90	1,067	143	151	283	11.9	1.6	1.7	3.1	
Greg Foster	F/C	UTEP	4	1995–1999	272	3,627	721	132	1,113	13.3	2.7	0.5	4.1	
Randy Foye	G	Villanova	1	2012–2013	82	2,249	127	167	882	27.4	1.5	2.0	10.8	
Bernie Fryer	G	BYU	1	1974–1975	31	432	46	52	127	13.9	1.5	1.7	4.1	
Todd Fuller	C	NC State	1	1998–1999	42	462	101	6	142	11.0	2.4	0.1	3.4	
Terry Furlow	G/F	Michigan State	1	1979–1980	55	1,718	152	221	878	31.2	2.8	4.0	16.0	

=== G ===
All-time roster
Player	Pos.	Pre-draft team	Yrs	Seasons	Statistics									Ref.
Player	Pos.	Pre-draft team	Yrs	Seasons	GP	MP	REB	AST	PTS	MPG	RPG	APG	PPG	Ref.
Sundiata Gaines	G	Georgia	1	2009–2010	32	217	29	39	106	6.8	0.9	1.2	3.3	
Chad Gallagher	C	Creighton	1	1993–1994	2	3	0	0	6	1.5	0.0	0.0	3.0	
Andersson Garcia	F	Texas A&M	1	2025–2026	5	169	42	14	26	33.8	8.4	2.8	5.2	
Diante Garrett	G	Iowa State	1	2013–2014	71	1,048	97	120	248	14.8	1.4	1.7	3.5	
Rudy Gay	F	UConn	2	2021–2023	111	1,854	405	113	739	16.7	3.6	1.0	6.7	
Keyonte George^{x}	G	Baylor	3	2023–2026	196	5,918	599	663	3,374	30.2	3.4	5.3	17.2	
John Gianelli	F/C	Pacific	1	1979–1980	17	285	62	17	55	16.8	3.6	1.0	3.2	
Armen Gilliam	F/C	UNLV	1	1999–2000	50	782	209	42	333	15.6	4.2	0.8	6.7	
Gordan Giriček	G/F	(Croatia) Cibona	5	2003–2008	226	4,689	474	321	2,016	20.7	2.1	1.4	8.9	
Rudy Gobert^{+}	C	(France) Cholet Basket	9	2013–2022	611	18,301	7,119	807	7,592	30.0	11.7	1.3	12.4	
Gail Goodrich^	G	UCLA	3	1976–1979	182	5,292	421	819	2,582	29.1	2.3	4.5	14.2	
Paul Grant	C	Wisconsin	1	2003–2004	10	98	17	3	25	9.8	1.7	0.3	2.5	
Hayden Gray^{x}	G	UC San Diego	1	2025–2026	1	25	0	1	6	25.0	0.0	1.0	6.0	
Erick Green	G	Virginia Tech	1	2015–2016	6	35	5	2	13	5.8	0.8	0.3	2.2	
Jeff Green	F	Georgetown	1	2019–2020	30	553	81	20	233	18.4	2.7	0.7	7.8	
Lamar Green	F/C	Morehead State	1	1974–1975	15	280	109	16	57	18.7	7.3	1.1	3.8	
Rickey Green^{+}	G	Michigan	8	1980–1988	606	17,329	1,379	4,159	6,917	28.6	2.3	6.9	11.4	
Sean Green	G/F	Iona	1	1993–1994	1	2	0	0	0	2.0	0.0	0.0	0.0	
Tommie Green	G	Southern	1	1978–1979	59	809	68	140	232	13.7	1.2	2.4	3.9	
Paul Griffin	F/C	Western Michigan	3	1976–1979	240	4,896	1,396	477	1,160	20.4	5.8	2.0	4.8	
Darrell Griffith (#35)	G	Louisville	10	1980–1985; 1986–1991	765	21,403	2,519	1,627	12,391	28.0	3.3	2.1	16.2	
Tom Gugliotta	F	NC State	1	2003–2004	25	515	131	42	93	20.6	5.2	1.7	3.7	

=== H ===
All-time roster
Player	Pos.	Pre-draft team	Yrs	Seasons	Statistics									Ref.
Player	Pos.	Pre-draft team	Yrs	Seasons	GP	MP	REB	AST	PTS	MPG	RPG	APG	PPG	Ref.
Ben Handlogten	C	Western Michigan	2	2003–2005	38	469	120	19	163	12.3	3.2	0.5	4.3	
Bob Hansen	G	Iowa	7	1983–1990	471	9,484	1,109	788	3,550	20.1	2.4	1.7	7.5	
James Hardy	F/C	San Francisco	4	1978–1982	249	5,379	1,312	315	1,410	21.6	5.3	1.3	5.7	
Elijah Harkless^{x}	G	UNLV	2	2024–2026	36	683	74	83	210	19.0	2.1	2.3	5.8	
Matt Harpring	F	Georgia Tech	7	2002–2009	474	12,251	2,325	645	5,640	25.8	4.9	1.4	11.9	
Devin Harris	G	Wisconsin	2	2010–2012	80	2,271	152	408	983	28.4	1.9	5.1	12.3	
Mike Harris	F	Rice	1	2013–2014	20	225	33	5	84	11.3	1.7	0.3	4.2	
Shaquille Harrison	G	Tulsa	1	2020–2021	17	56	9	9	17	3.3	0.5	0.5	1.0	
Jason Hart	G	Syracuse	1	2007–2008	57	606	55	86	165	10.6	1.0	1.5	2.9	
Steve Hayes	C	Idaho State	1	1985–1986	58	397	77	7	89	6.8	1.3	0.1	1.5	
Gordon Hayward^{+}	G/F	Butler	7	2010–2017	516	16,164	2,149	1,762	8,077	31.3	4.2	3.4	15.7	
Spencer Haywood^	F/C	Detroit Mercy	1	1978–1979	34	1,338	327	71	816	39.4	9.6	2.1	24.0	
Taylor Hendricks	F	UCF	3	2023–2026	76	1,423	299	58	469	18.7	3.9	0.8	6.2	
Juancho Hernangómez	F	(Spain) Estudiantes	1	2021–2022	17	298	60	14	105	17.5	3.5	0.8	6.2	
George Hill	G	IUPUI	1	2016–2017	49	1,544	167	204	829	31.5	3.4	4.2	16.9	
Blake Hinson^{x}	F	Pittsburgh	1	2025–2026	14	285	33	16	167	20.4	2.4	1.1	11.9	
Rodney Hood	G/F	Duke	4	2014–2018	227	6,282	697	457	2,985	27.7	3.1	2.0	13.1	
Jeff Hornacek (#14)	G	Iowa State	7	1993–2000	477	14,730	1,339	1,895	6,848	30.9	2.8	4.0	14.4	
Talen Horton-Tucker	G	Iowa State	2	2022–2024	116	2,322	331	423	1,214	20.0	2.9	3.6	10.5	
Danuel House	G	Texas A&M	1	2021–2022	25	491	68	25	171	19.6	2.7	1.0	6.8	
Josh Howard	G/F	Wake Forest	1	2011–2012	43	991	158	50	372	23.0	3.7	1.2	8.7	
Mo Howard	G	Maryland	1	1976–1977	23	317	34	37	131	13.8	1.5	1.6	5.7	
Stephen Howard	F	DePaul	3	1992–1994; 1996–1997	100	662	152	21	285	6.6	1.5	0.2	2.9	
Troy Hudson	G	Southern Illinois	1	1997–1998	8	23	2	4	12	2.9	0.3	0.5	1.5	
Eddie Hughes	G	Colorado State	1	1987–1988	11	42	4	8	17	3.8	0.4	0.7	1.5	
Elijah Hughes	G/F	Syracuse	2	2020–2022	32	176	26	12	74	5.5	0.8	0.4	2.3	
Jay Humphries	G	Colorado	3	1992–1995	165	3,802	280	545	1,261	23.0	1.7	3.3	7.6	
Kris Humphries	F/C	Minnesota	2	2004–2006	129	1,492	354	73	466	11.6	2.7	0.6	3.6	

=== I to J ===
All-time roster
Player	Pos.	Pre-draft team	Yrs	Seasons	Statistics									Ref.
Player	Pos.	Pre-draft team	Yrs	Seasons	GP	MP	REB	AST	PTS	MPG	RPG	APG	PPG	Ref.
Marc Iavaroni	F	Virginia	4	1985–1989	262	3,224	650	164	927	12.3	2.5	0.6	3.5	
Ersan İlyasova	F	(Turkey) Ülkerspor	1	2020–2021	17	148	29	4	65	8.7	1.7	0.2	3.8	
Joe Ingles	F	(Australia) South Dragons	8	2014–2022	590	15,158	1,914	2,213	5,094	25.7	3.2	3.8	8.6	
Frank Jackson	G	Duke	1	2022–2023	1	5	2	1	0	5.0	2.0	1.0	0.0	
Mark Jackson	G	St. John's	1	2002–2003	82	1,467	176	375	382	17.9	2.1	4.6	4.7	
Jaren Jackson Jr.^{x}	F/C	Michigan State	1	2025–2026	3	72	13	8	67	24.0	4.3	2.7	22.3	
Dave Jamerson	G/F	Ohio	1	1993–1994	1	4	1	0	1	4.0	1.0	0.0	1.0	
Aaron James	F	Grambling State	5	1974–1979	356	7,671	1,470	370	3,829	21.5	4.1	1.0	10.8	
Henry James	F	St. Mary's (TX)	1	1992–1993	2	9	1	0	7	4.5	0.5	0.0	3.5	
Othyus Jeffers	G	Robert Morris (IL)	1	2009–2010	14	73	19	1	37	5.2	1.4	0.1	2.6	
Al Jefferson	F/C	Prentiss HS (MS)	3	2010–2013	221	7,593	2,099	447	4,089	34.4	9.5	2.0	18.5	
Richard Jefferson	F	Arizona	1	2013–2014	82	2,213	219	130	831	27.0	2.7	1.6	10.1	
Jonas Jerebko	F	(Italy) Pallacanestro Biella	1	2017–2018	74	1,134	246	42	429	15.3	3.3	0.6	5.8	
Grant Jerrett	F	Arizona	1	2014–2015	3	26	5	2	9	8.7	1.7	0.7	3.0	
Chris Johnson	G/F	Dayton	2	2014–2016	82	1,068	150	52	286	13.0	1.8	0.6	3.5	
Eric Johnson	G	Nebraska	1	1989–1990	48	272	28	64	54	5.7	0.6	1.3	1.1	
Joe Johnson	G/F	Arkansas	2	2016–2018	110	2,543	350	189	948	23.1	3.2	1.7	8.6	
Ollie Johnson	F	Temple	1	1974–1975	43	1,159	177	80	340	27.0	4.1	1.9	7.9	
Nate Johnston	F	Tampa	1	1989–1990	6	13	2	0	11	2.2	0.3	0.0	1.8	
Damian Jones	C	Vanderbilt	1	2022–2023	19	301	67	11	87	15.8	3.5	0.6	4.6	
Jeff Judkins	G/F	Utah	1	1980–1981	62	666	93	59	238	10.7	1.5	1.0	3.8	
Johnny Juzang	G	UCLA	3	2022–2025	102	1,874	259	99	802	18.4	2.5	1.0	7.9	

=== K to L ===
All-time roster
Player	Pos.	Pre-draft team	Yrs	Seasons	Statistics									Ref.
Player	Pos.	Pre-draft team	Yrs	Seasons	GP	MP	REB	AST	PTS	MPG	RPG	APG	PPG	Ref.
Enes Kanter	C	(Turkey) Fenerbahçe	4	2011–2015	265	5,416	1,564	140	2,475	20.4	5.9	0.5	9.3	
Adam Keefe	F	Stanford	6	1994–2000	405	7,186	1,714	277	2,124	17.7	4.2	0.7	5.2	
Rich Kelley	F/C	Stanford	7	1975–1979; 1982–1985	497	11,405	3,972	1,237	4,044	22.9	8.0	2.5	8.1	
Walker Kessler^{x}	C	Auburn	4	2022–2026	201	5,090	1,862	241	1,910	25.3	9.3	1.2	9.5	
Stanton Kidd	G	Colorado State	1	2019–2020	4	15	3	1	0	3.8	0.8	0.3	0.0	
Carl Kilpatrick	C	Louisiana–Monroe	1	1979–1980	2	6	4	0	3	3.0	2.0	0.0	1.5	
Toby Kimball	F/C	UConn	1	1974–1975	3	90	26	4	20	30.0	8.7	1.3	6.7	
Bernard King^	F	Tennessee	1	1979–1980	19	419	88	52	176	22.1	4.6	2.7	9.3	
Chris King	F	Wake Forest	1	1998–1999	8	42	11	1	4	5.3	1.4	0.1	0.5	
Andrei Kirilenko^{+}	F	(Russia) CSKA Moscow	10	2001–2011	681	20,989	3,836	1,919	8,411	30.8	5.6	2.8	12.4	
Brevin Knight	G	Stanford	1	2008–2009	74	938	88	190	180	12.7	1.2	2.6	2.4	
Bart Kofoed	G	Nebraska–Kearney	2	1987–1989	55	401	26	43	76	7.3	0.5	0.8	1.4	
John Konchar^{x}	G	Purdue Fort Wayne	1	2025–2026	26	680	148	78	153	26.2	5.7	3.0	5.9	
Kyle Korver	G/F	Creighton	4	2007–2010; 2018–2019	234	4,984	601	358	2,062	21.3	2.6	1.5	8.8	
Kosta Koufos	C	Ohio State	2	2008–2010	84	737	183	26	277	8.8	2.2	0.3	3.3	
Larry Krystkowiak	F/C	Montana	1	1992–1993	71	1,362	279	68	513	19.2	3.9	1.0	7.2	
Stu Lantz	G	Nebraska	1	1974–1975	19	353	24	30	125	18.6	1.3	1.6	6.6	
Rusty LaRue	G	Wake Forest	1	2001–2002	33	542	49	71	193	16.4	1.5	2.2	5.8	
Eric Leckner	F/C	Wyoming	2	1988–1990	152	1,543	391	35	650	10.2	2.6	0.2	4.3	
Ron Lee	G	Oregon	1	1978–1979	17	398	55	73	114	23.4	3.2	4.3	6.7	
Russ Lee	G/F	Marshall	1	1974–1975	15	139	31	7	65	9.3	2.1	0.5	4.3	
Tim Legler	G	La Salle	1	1992–1993	3	5	1	0	2	1.7	0.3	0.0	0.7	
Jim Les	G	Bradley	2	1988–1990	83	787	87	216	140	9.5	1.0	2.6	1.7	
Kira Lewis Jr.	G	Alabama	1	2023–2024	12	119	12	19	45	9.9	1.0	1.6	3.8	
Quincy Lewis	F	Minnesota	3	1999–2002	145	1,788	203	94	551	12.3	1.4	0.6	3.8	
Randy Livingston	G	LSU	1	2004–2005	17	227	12	45	64	13.4	0.7	2.6	3.8	
Kenneth Lofton Jr.	F	Louisiana Tech	1	2023–2024	4	91	20	19	55	22.8	5.0	4.8	13.8	
Raül López	G	(Spain) Real Madrid Baloncesto	2	2003–2005	113	2,135	194	428	733	18.9	1.7	3.8	6.5	
Kevin Love^{x}	F	UCLA	1	2025–2026	37	613	215	67	248	16.6	5.8	1.8	6.7	
John Lucas III	G	Oklahoma State	1	2013–2014	42	591	39	42	159	14.1	0.9	1.0	3.8	
Trey Lyles	F	Kentucky	2	2015–2017	151	2,540	534	128	928	16.8	3.5	0.8	6.1	

=== M ===
All-time roster
Player	Pos.	Pre-draft team	Yrs	Seasons	Statistics									Ref.
Player	Pos.	Pre-draft team	Yrs	Seasons	GP	MP	REB	AST	PTS	MPG	RPG	APG	PPG	Ref.
Shelvin Mack	G	Butler	2	2015–2017	83	2,084	231	303	785	25.1	2.8	3.7	9.5	
Jeff Malone	G	Mississippi State	4	1990–1994	279	9,603	727	517	5,158	34.4	2.6	1.9	18.5	
Karl Malone (#32)^	F	Louisiana Tech	18	1985–2003	1,434	53,479	14,601	5,085	36,374	37.3	10.2	3.5	25.4	
Danny Manning	F/C	Kansas	1	2000–2001	82	1,305	214	92	603	15.9	2.6	1.1	7.4	
Pace Mannion	G	Utah	2	1984–1986	91	863	105	82	325	9.5	1.2	0.9	3.6	
Pete Maravich (#7)^	G	LSU	6	1974–1980	330	12,654	1,435	1,844	8,324	38.3	4.3	5.6	25.2	
Lauri Markkanen*	F	Arizona	4	2022–2026	210	7,012	1,586	392	4,984	33.4	7.6	1.9	23.7	
Donyell Marshall	F	UConn	2	2000–2002	139	4,076	1,009	234	1,959	29.3	7.3	1.7	14.1	
KJ Martin	F	IMG Academy	1	2024–2025	19	432	53	29	120	22.7	2.8	1.5	6.3	
Tony Massenburg	F	Maryland	1	2002–2003	58	792	156	17	273	13.7	2.7	0.3	4.7	
Wesley Matthews	G	Marquette	1	2009–2010	82	2,025	191	124	769	24.7	2.3	1.5	9.4	
Eric Maynor	G	VCU	1	2009–2010	26	363	38	81	134	14.0	1.5	3.1	5.2	
Bez Mbeng^{x}	G	Yale	1	2025–2026	15	492	57	62	122	32.8	3.8	4.1	8.1	
Erik McCree	F	Louisiana Tech	1	2017–2018	4	8	1	0	0	2.0	0.3	0.0	0.0	
Jim McElroy	G	Central Michigan	4	1975–1979	277	7,621	656	1,112	3,188	27.5	2.4	4.0	11.5	
Billy McKinney	G	Northwestern	1	1980–1981	35	1,032	74	157	293	29.5	2.1	4.5	8.4	
Keith McLeod	G	Bowling Green	2	2004–2006	119	2,614	191	387	786	22.0	1.6	3.3	6.6	
Joe Meriweather	F/C	Southern Illinois	2	1977–1979	90	1,917	556	89	694	21.3	6.2	1.0	7.7	
C. J. Miles	G/F	Skyline HS (TX)	7	2005–2012	389	7,499	857	510	3,264	19.3	2.2	1.3	8.4	
Dick Miller	F	Toledo	1	1980–1981	3	19	3	1	4	6.3	1.0	0.3	1.3	
Patty Mills	G	Saint Mary's	1	2024–2025	17	260	21	21	74	15.3	1.2	1.2	4.4	
Elijah Millsap	G/F	UAB	2	2014–2016	67	1,097	185	77	284	16.4	2.8	1.1	4.2	
Paul Millsap	F	Louisiana Tech	7	2006–2013	540	14,821	3,792	950	6,713	27.4	7.0	1.8	12.4	
Donovan Mitchell^{+}	G	Louisville	5	2017–2022	345	11,637	1,433	1,542	8,234	33.7	4.2	4.5	23.9	
Naz Mitrou-Long	G	Iowa State	2	2017–2019	15	85	6	15	19	5.7	0.4	1.0	1.3	
Greg Monroe	C	Georgetown	1	2021–2022	3	26	9	3	12	8.7	3.0	1.0	4.0	
Mikki Moore	F/C	Nebraska	1	2003–2004	28	385	82	19	128	13.8	2.9	0.7	4.6	
Otto Moore	F/C	UTPA	3	1974–1977	202	5,546	1,757	479	1,486	27.5	8.7	2.4	7.4	
Juwan Morgan	F	Indiana	2	2019–2021	50	281	57	15	71	5.6	1.1	0.3	1.4	
Darren Morningstar	C	Pittsburgh	1	1993–1994	1	4	1	0	2	4.0	1.0	0.0	2.0	
Chris Morris	F	Auburn	3	1995–1998	193	2,939	505	144	1,238	15.2	2.6	0.7	6.4	
Emmanuel Mudiay	G	(China) Guangdong Southern Tigers	1	2019–2020	54	850	126	116	395	15.7	2.3	2.1	7.3	
Chris Munk	F	USC	1	1990–1991	11	29	14	1	13	2.6	1.3	0.1	1.2	
Eric Murdock	G	Providence	1	1991–1992	50	478	54	92	203	9.6	1.1	1.8	4.1	
Kevin Murphy	G	Tennessee Tech	1	2012–2013	17	52	4	2	15	3.1	0.2	0.1	0.9	
Toure' Murry	G/F	Wichita State	1	2014–2015	1	1	0	0	0	1.0	0.0	0.0	0.0	
Svi Mykhailiuk^{x}	F	Kansas	2	2024–2026	88	1,916	214	169	803	21.8	2.4	1.9	9.1	

=== N to P ===
All-time roster
Player	Pos.	Pre-draft team	Yrs	Seasons	Statistics									Ref.
Player	Pos.	Pre-draft team	Yrs	Seasons	GP	MP	REB	AST	PTS	MPG	RPG	APG	PPG	Ref.
Kenny Natt	G	Louisiana–Monroe	2	1982–1983; 1984–1985	26	223	24	28	91	8.6	0.9	1.1	3.5	
Louie Nelson	G	Washington	2	1974–1976	138	3,928	398	347	1,629	28.5	2.9	2.5	11.8	
Ruben Nembhard	G	Weber State	1	1996–1997	8	94	8	12	32	11.8	1.0	1.5	4.0	
Raul Neto	G	(Spain) Gipuzkoa Basket	4	2015–2019	199	2,817	261	376	955	14.2	1.3	1.9	4.8	
Georges Niang	F	Iowa State	4	2017–2021	206	2,625	399	141	1,136	12.7	1.9	0.7	5.5	
Carl Nicks	G	Indiana State	2	1980–1982	120	1,938	222	158	839	16.2	1.9	1.3	7.0	
Steve Novak	F	Marquette	1	2014–2015	22	109	16	6	48	5.0	0.7	0.3	2.2	
Jusuf Nurkić^{x}	C	(Croatia) Cedevita Junior	1	2025–2026	41	1,083	425	196	447	26.4	10.4	4.8	10.9	
J. J. O'Brien	F	San Diego State	1	2015–2016	2	6	1	0	0	3.0	0.5	0.0	0.0	
Mehmet Okur^{+}	F/C	(Turkey) Anadolu Efes	7	2004–2011	474	15,029	3,599	919	7,255	31.7	7.6	1.9	15.3	
Kelly Olynyk	C	Gonzaga	2	2022–2024	118	2,961	674	471	1,253	25.1	5.7	4.0	10.6	
Royce O'Neale	F	Baylor	5	2017–2022	370	9,517	1,763	771	2,285	25.7	4.8	2.1	6.2	
Miye Oni	G/F	Yale	3	2019–2022	80	672	108	37	145	8.4	1.4	0.5	1.8	
José Ortiz	F	Oregon State	2	1988–1990	64	391	73	18	183	6.1	1.1	0.3	2.9	
Greg Ostertag	C	Kansas	10	1995–2004; 2005–2006	700	14,197	3,978	406	3,425	20.3	5.7	0.6	4.9	
Dan O'Sullivan	C	Fordham	1	1990–1991	21	85	17	4	21	4.0	0.8	0.2	1.0	
Andre Owens	G	Houston	1	2005–2006	23	210	21	8	69	9.1	0.9	0.3	3.0	
Scott Padgett	F	Kentucky	4	1999–2003	231	3,175	684	198	1,142	13.7	3.0	0.9	4.9	
Milt Palacio	G	Colorado State	1	2005–2006	71	1,376	134	190	441	19.4	1.9	2.7	6.2	
Walter Palmer	F/C	Dartmouth	1	1990–1991	28	85	21	6	40	3.0	0.8	0.2	1.4	
Eric Paschall	F	Villanova	1	2021–2022	58	737	106	36	334	12.7	1.8	0.6	5.8	
Billy Paultz	F/C	St. John's	1	1984–1985	62	370	96	16	82	6.0	1.5	0.3	1.3	
Aleksandar Pavlović	G/F	(Montenegro) Budućnost	1	2003–2004	79	1,144	159	60	382	14.5	2.0	0.8	4.8	
Norvel Pelle	C	Manuel Dominguez High School	1	2021–2022	3	19	6	0	6	6.3	2.0	0.0	2.0	
Tibor Pleiß	C	(Germany) Brose Bamberg	1	2015–2016	12	82	15	2	24	6.8	1.3	0.2	2.0	
Olden Polynice	F/C	Virginia	2	1999–2001	163	3,438	831	68	864	21.1	5.1	0.4	5.3	
Ben Poquette	F/C	Central Michigan	4	1979–1983	321	9,186	2,121	554	2,873	28.6	6.6	1.7	9.0	
Micah Potter	F/C	Wisconsin	3	2022–2025	61	943	223	41	239	15.5	3.7	0.7	3.9	
Roger Powell	F	Illinois	1	2006–2007	3	13	3	0	2	4.3	1.0	0.0	0.7	
Jason Preston	G	Ohio	1	2023–2024	7	71	17	16	12	10.1	2.4	2.3	1.7	
Ronnie Price	G	Utah Valley	4	2007–2011	232	2,849	250	365	887	12.3	1.1	1.6	3.8	

=== R to S ===
All-time roster
Player	Pos.	Pre-draft team	Yrs	Seasons	Statistics									Ref.
Player	Pos.	Pre-draft team	Yrs	Seasons	GP	MP	REB	AST	PTS	MPG	RPG	APG	PPG	Ref.
Aleksandar Radojević	C	Barton CC	1	2004–2005	12	128	28	6	19	10.7	2.3	0.5	1.6	
Rick Roberson	F/C	Cincinnati	1	1974–1975	16	339	118	23	119	21.2	7.4	1.4	7.4	
Fred Roberts	F/C	BYU	2	1984–1986	110	1,342	231	92	666	12.2	2.1	0.8	6.1	
Truck Robinson^{+}	F/C	Tennessee State	2	1977–1979	125	5,419	1,865	245	2,901	43.4	14.9	2.0	23.2	
Bill Robinzine	F	DePaul	1	1981–1982	56	651	144	49	323	11.6	2.6	0.9	5.8	
Scott Roth	F	Wisconsin	2	1987–1989	42	273	36	23	107	6.5	0.9	0.5	2.5	
Ricky Rubio	G	(Spain) Joventut Badalona	2	2017–2019	145	4,153	594	826	1,872	28.6	4.1	5.7	12.9	
Delaney Rudd	G	Wake Forest	3	1989–1992	224	2,262	175	502	790	10.1	0.8	2.2	3.5	
Michael Ruffin	F	Tulsa	1	2003–2004	41	733	207	41	92	17.9	5.0	1.0	2.2	
Brandon Rush	G/F	Kansas	1	2013–2014	38	418	44	24	79	11.0	1.2	0.6	2.1	
Bryon Russell	F	Long Beach State	9	1993–2002	628	16,443	2,387	869	5,752	26.2	3.8	1.4	9.2	
Luka Šamanić	F	(Slovenia) KK Olimpija	2	2022–2024	50	565	132	34	246	11.3	2.6	0.7	4.9	
Fred Saunders	F	Syracuse	1	1977–1978	30	400	74	35	150	13.3	2.5	1.2	5.0	
Danny Schayes	F/C	Syracuse	2	1981–1983	132	3,261	876	311	1,263	24.7	6.6	2.4	9.6	
Carey Scurry	F	LIU Brooklyn	3	1985–1988	176	2,368	521	191	845	13.5	3.0	1.1	4.8	
Thabo Sefolosha	G/F	(Italy) Pallacanestro Biella	2	2017–2019	88	1,415	284	60	502	16.1	3.2	0.7	5.7	
Brice Sensabaugh^{x}	F	Ohio State	3	2023–2026	178	3,778	543	308	2,129	21.2	3.1	1.7	12.0	
Collin Sexton	G	Alabama	3	2022–2025	189	4,978	481	785	3,302	26.3	2.5	4.1	17.5	
Robert Smith	G	UNLV	1	1979–1980	6	73	3	7	15	12.2	0.5	1.2	2.5	
Xavier Sneed	F	Kansas State	1	2021–2022	7	31	4	1	5	4.4	0.6	0.1	0.7	
Kirk Snyder	G	Nevada	1	2004–2005	68	906	121	36	338	13.3	1.8	0.5	5.0	
Felton Spencer	C	Louisville	3	1993–1996	184	4,382	1,224	71	1,390	23.8	6.7	0.4	7.6	
Jaden Springer	G	Tennessee	1	2024–2025	17	224	34	23	64	13.2	2.0	1.4	3.8	
Bud Stallworth	G/F	Kansas	3	1974–1977	169	3,245	462	122	1,497	19.2	2.7	0.7	8.9	
John Starks	G	Oklahoma State	2	2000–2002	141	3,051	222	248	989	21.6	1.6	1.8	7.0	
DeShawn Stevenson	G	Washington Union HS (CA)	4	2000–2004	222	3,698	422	266	1,311	16.7	1.9	1.2	5.9	
David Stockton	G	Gonzaga	1	2017–2018	3	9	0	0	10	3.0	0.0	0.0	3.3	
John Stockton (#12)^	G	Gonzaga	19	1984–2003	1,504	47,764	4,051	15,806	19,711	31.8	2.7	10.5	13.1	

=== T to Y ===
All-time roster
Player	Pos.	Pre-draft team	Yrs	Seasons	Statistics									Ref.
Player	Pos.	Pre-draft team	Yrs	Seasons	GP	MP	REB	AST	PTS	MPG	RPG	APG	PPG	Ref.
Ira Terrell	F/C	SMU	1	1978–1979	31	572	109	26	153	18.5	3.5	0.8	4.9	
Malcolm Thomas	F	San Diego State	1	2013–2014	7	48	12	2	13	6.9	1.7	0.3	1.9	
Matt Thomas	G	Iowa State	1	2020–2021	19	134	23	10	68	7.1	1.2	0.5	3.6	
Brooks Thompson	G	Oklahoma State	1	1996–1997	2	8	0	1	0	4.0	0.0	0.5	0.0	
Bob Thornton	F/C	UC Irvine	1	1991–1992	2	6	2	0	4	3.0	1.0	0.0	2.0	
Jamaal Tinsley	G	Iowa State	3	2011–2014	111	1,838	171	436	375	16.6	1.5	3.9	3.4	
Andy Toolson	G/F	BYU	2	1990–1991; 1995–1996	60	523	73	32	159	8.7	1.2	0.5	2.7	
Juan Toscano-Anderson	F	Marquette	1	2022–2023	22	335	63	40	74	15.2	2.9	1.8	3.4	
Kelly Tripucka	G/F	Notre Dame	2	1986–1988	128	2,841	359	348	1,166	22.2	2.8	2.7	9.1	
Oscar Tshiebwe^{x}	C	Kentucky	2	2024–2026	41	703	301	41	318	17.1	7.3	1.0	7.8	
Rayjon Tucker	G	Little Rock	1	2019–2020	20	161	20	5	62	8.1	1.0	0.3	3.1	
Melvin Turpin	C	Kentucky	1	1987–1988	79	1,011	236	32	470	12.8	3.0	0.4	5.9	
Ekpe Udoh	F/C	Baylor	2	2017–2019	114	1,130	240	81	281	9.9	2.1	0.7	2.5	
Denzel Valentine	G	Michigan State	1	2021–2022	2	18	4	0	5	9.0	2.0	0.0	2.5	
Jarred Vanderbilt	F	Kentucky	1	2022–2023	52	1,254	409	142	432	24.1	7.9	2.7	8.3	
Jacque Vaughn	G	Kansas	4	1997–2001	224	3,010	264	540	970	13.4	1.2	2.4	4.3	
Brett Vroman	C	UNLV	1	1980–1981	11	93	25	9	34	8.5	2.3	0.8	3.1	
Andre Wakefield	G	Loyola (IL)	1	1979–1980	8	47	4	3	15	5.9	0.5	0.4	1.9	
Neal Walk	C	Florida	1	1974–1975	37	851	262	101	366	23.0	7.1	2.7	9.9	
Andy Walker	G	Niagara	1	1976–1977	40	438	75	32	180	11.0	1.9	0.8	4.5	
Earl Watson	G	UCLA	3	2010–2013	178	3,429	390	685	588	19.3	2.2	3.8	3.3	
Jamie Watson	F	South Carolina	3	1994–1997	89	1,019	119	93	276	11.4	1.3	1.0	3.1	
Slick Watts	G	Xavier (LS)	1	1977–1978	39	775	98	161	280	19.9	2.5	4.1	7.2	
Kyle Weaver	G	Washington State	1	2010–2011	5	69	10	7	28	13.8	2.0	1.4	5.6	
Robert Whaley	C	Walsh	1	2005–2006	23	212	43	17	49	9.2	1.9	0.7	2.1	
Eric White	F	Pepperdine	1	1988–1989	1	2	0	0	0	2.0	0.0	0.0	0.0	
Jerome Whitehead	F/C	Marquette	1	1979–1980	32	328	97	18	67	10.3	3.0	0.6	2.1	
Hassan Whiteside	C	Marshall	1	2021–2022	65	1,162	494	26	534	17.9	7.6	0.4	8.2	
Jeff Wilkins	F/C	Illinois State	6	1980–1986	427	9,482	2,447	444	3,445	22.2	5.7	1.0	8.1	
Aaron Williams	F/C	Xavier	1	1993–1994	6	12	3	1	4	2.0	0.5	0.2	0.7	
Cody Williams^{x}	G	Colorado	2	2024–2026	117	2,691	311	196	818	23.0	2.7	1.7	7.0	
Deron Williams^{+}	G	Illinois	6	2005–2011	439	15,632	1,407	4,003	7,576	35.6	3.2	9.1	17.3	
Duck Williams	G	Notre Dame	1	1979–1980	77	1,794	106	183	506	23.3	1.4	2.4	6.6	
Elliot Williams	G	Memphis	1	2014–2015	5	42	3	4	18	8.4	0.6	0.8	3.6	
Freeman Williams	G/F	Portland State	1	1982–1983	18	210	17	10	92	11.7	0.9	0.6	5.1	
Marvin Williams	F	North Carolina	2	2012–2014	139	3,401	597	155	1,132	24.5	4.3	1.1	8.1	
Mo Williams	G	Alabama	2	2003–2004; 2012–2013	103	2,190	182	361	876	21.3	1.8	3.5	8.5	
Nate Williams	G/F	Utah State	4	1974–1978	222	4,959	914	300	2,726	22.3	4.1	1.4	12.3	
Rickey Williams	G	Long Beach State	1	1982–1983	44	346	38	37	147	7.9	0.9	0.8	3.3	
Nigel Williams-Goss	G	Washington	1	2019–2020	10	50	6	6	14	5.0	0.6	0.6	1.4	
Vince Williams Jr.	G	VCU	1	2025–2026	6	84	19	16	28	14.0	3.2	2.7	4.7	
Jeff Withey	C	Kansas	2	2015–2017	102	1,090	294	27	363	10.7	2.9	0.3	3.6	
Nate Wolters	G	South Dakota State	1	2017–2018	5	19	2	1	2	3.8	0.4	0.2	0.4	
Howard Wood	F	Tennessee	1	1981–1982	42	342	65	9	144	8.1	1.5	0.2	3.4	
Sam Worthen	G	Marquette	1	1981–1982	5	22	1	3	4	4.4	0.2	0.6	0.8	
Luther Wright	C	Seton Hall	1	1993–1994	15	92	10	0	19	6.1	0.7	0.0	1.3	
Justin Wright-Foreman	G	Hofstra	1	2019–2020	4	45	5	7	19	11.3	1.3	1.8	4.8	
Ömer Yurtseven	C	Georgetown	1	2023–2024	48	545	208	29	222	11.4	4.3	0.6	4.6	
