= Demographics of Utah =

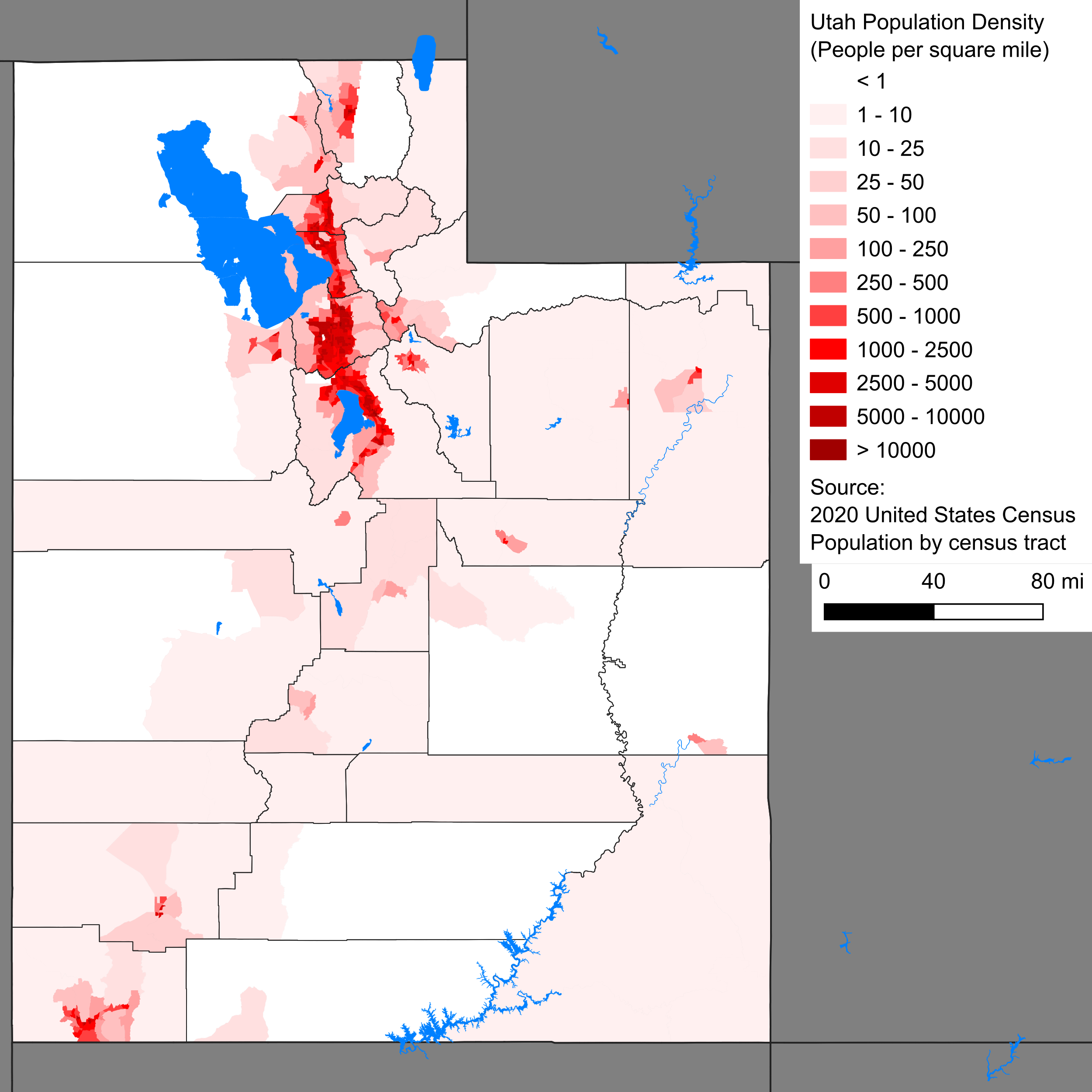
Utah Population Density Map

Utah is the 30th most populous state in the United States with a population of about 3.3 million, according to projections from the US Census Bureau's 2017 estimates. The state has also been characterized by a tremendous amount of growth in the last decade, with the highest percent increase in population of any state since 2010. Utah has a surface area of 84,899 square miles, though around 80% of its population is concentrated around a metropolitan area in the north-central part of the state known as the Wasatch Front.

== Population ==
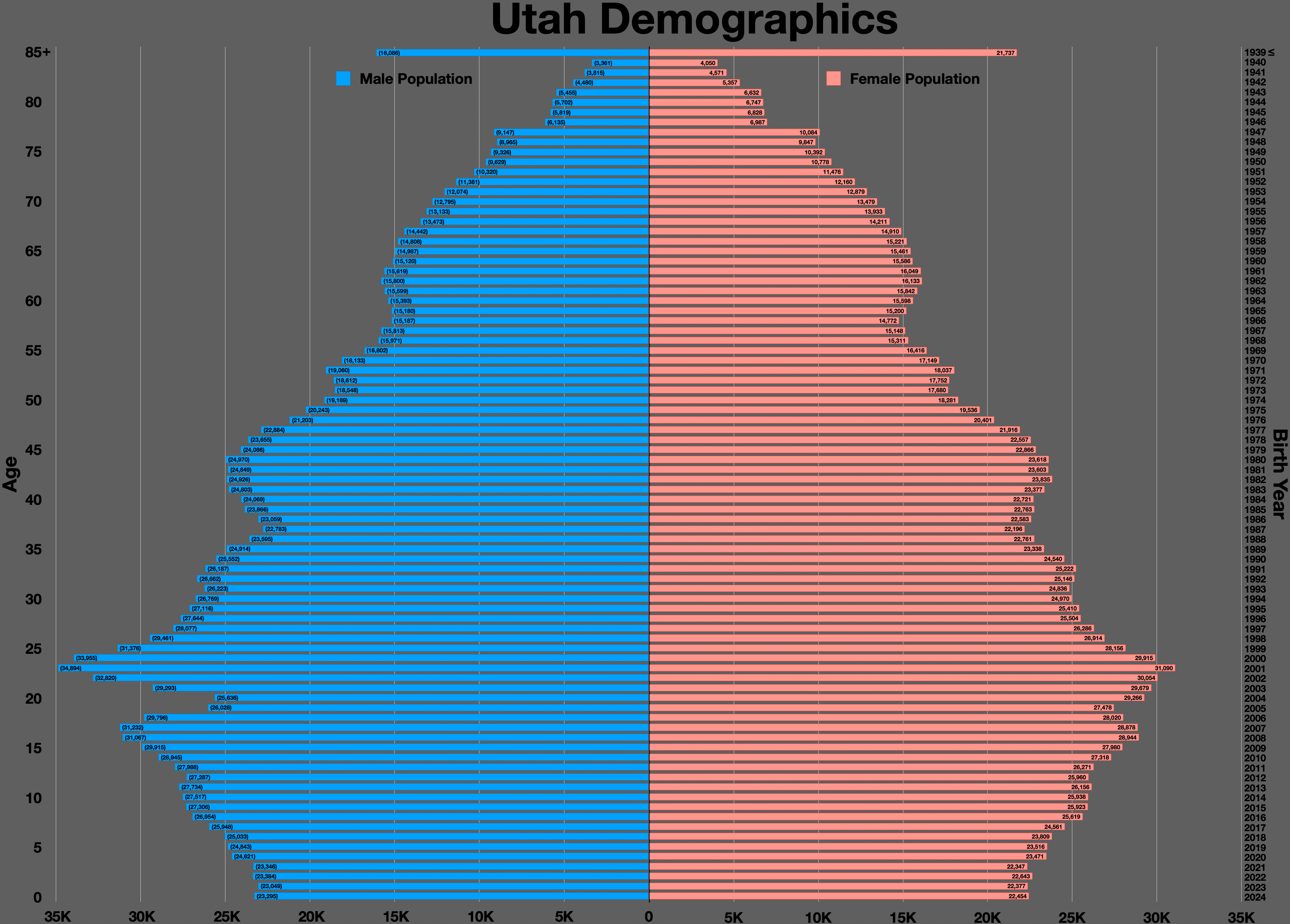
Utah population pyramid

Historical population
Year	Pop.	±%
1850	11,380	—
1860	40,272	+253.9%
1870	86,336	+114.4%
1880	143,963	+66.7%
1890	210,779	+46.4%
1900	276,749	+31.3%
1910	373,351	+34.9%
1920	449,396	+20.4%
1930	507,847	+13.0%
1940	550,310	+8.4%
1950	688,862	+25.2%
1960	890,627	+29.3%
1970	1,059,273	+18.9%
1980	1,461,037	+37.9%
1990	1,722,850	+17.9%
2000	2,233,169	+29.6%
2010	2,763,885	+23.8%
2020	3,271,616	+18.4%
2025	3,538,904	+8.2%
Source: US Census Bureau (1910–2020), 2025 Census Bureau Estimate

The United States Census Bureau estimates that the population of Utah was 3,205,958 on July 1, 2019, a 16.00% increase since the 2010 United States census.

The center of population of Utah is located in Utah County in the city of Lehi. As of April 1, 2010 the 2010 census indicated that Utah had a population of 2,763,885. In 2008, the U.S. Census Bureau determined Utah was the fastest-growing state in the country.

Much of the population lives in cities and towns along the Wasatch Front, a metropolitan region that runs north–south with the Wasatch Mountains rising on the eastern side. Growth outside the Wasatch Front is also increasing. The St. George metropolitan area is currently the second fastest-growing in the country after the Las Vegas metropolitan area, while the Heber micropolitan area is also the second fastest-growing in the country (behind Palm Coast, Florida).

Utah contains five metropolitan areas (Logan, Ogden-Clearfield, Salt Lake City, Provo-Orem, and St. George), and four micropolitan areas (Heber, Vernal, Price, and Cedar City).

== Vital statistics ==
Note: Births in table do not add up, because Hispanics are counted both by their ethnicity and by their race, giving a higher overall number.

Live births by single race/ethnicity of mother
Race	2014	2015	2016	2017	2018	2019	2020	2021	2022	2023	2024
White	39,433 (77.1%)	38,473 (75.8%)	37,791 (74.9%)	36,492 (75.1%)	34,303 (72.7%)	33,363 (71.2%)	33,145 (72.5%)	33,789 (72.3%)	32,461 (70.9%)	31,629 (70.3%)	31,644 (67.8%)
Asian	1,850 (3.6%)	1,875 (3.7%)	1,185 (2.3%)	1,233 (2.5%)	1,131 (2.4%)	1,092 (2.3%)	1,146 (2.5%)	1,187 (2.5%)	1,210 (2.6%)	1,155 (2.6%)	1,232 (2.6%)
Pacific Islander	...	...	401 (0.8%)	469 (1.0%)	468 (1.0%)	460 (1.0%)	518 (1.1%)	475 (1.0%)	575 (1.3%)	580 (1.3%)	818 (1.7%)
Black	740 (1.4%)	823 (1.6%)	523 (1.0%)	569 (1.2%)	521 (1.1%)	580 (1.2%)	576 (1.3%)	594 (1.3%)	606 (1.3%)	653 (1.4%)	649 (1.4%)
American Indian	713 (1.4%)	699 (1.4%)	467 (0.9%)	445 (0.9%)	418 (0.9%)	357 (0.8%)	341 (0.7%)	360 (0.8%)	303 (0.7%)	342 (0.8%)	322 (0.7%)
Hispanic (any race)	7,764 (15.2%)	7,876 (15.5%)	7,966 (15.8%)	7,832 (16.1%)	8,133 (17.2%)	8,139 (17.4%)	8,160 (17.8%)	8,358 (17.9%)	8,920 (19.5%)	9,236 (20.5%)	10,321 (22.1%)
Total	51,154 (100%)	50,778 (100%)	50,464 (100%)	48,585 (100%)	47,209 (100%)	46,826 (100%)	45,702 (100%)	46,712 (100%)	45,768 (100%)	45,019 (100%)	46,664 (100%)

- Since 2016, data for births of White Hispanic origin are not collected, but included in one Hispanic group; persons of Hispanic origin may be of any race.

== Ancestry ==
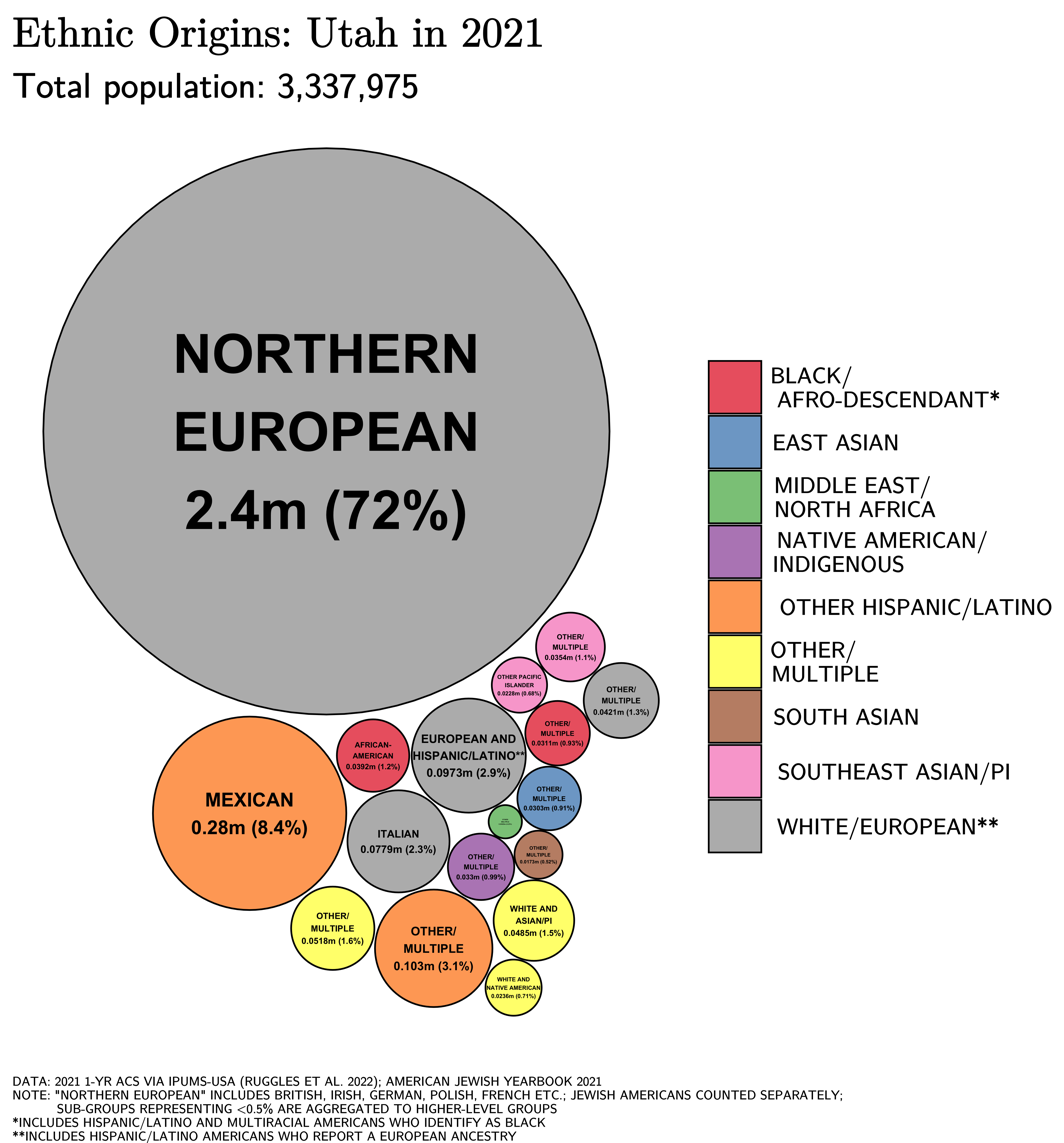
Ethnic origins in Utah as of 2021

According to 2010 United States census projections, the racial and ethnic makeup of Utah are as follows:

- 88.6% White or European
- 2.8% Asian American
- 1.8% American Indians and Alaskan Natives
- 1.6% African American
- 1.3% Pacific Islander
- 6.9% Some other race
- 13% Hispanic/Latino (of any race)

Demographics of Utah (csv)
By race	White	Black	AIAN*	Asian	NHPI*
2000 (total population)	95.20%	1.14%	1.84%	2.20%	0.97%
2000 (Hispanic only)	8.62%	0.16%	0.26%	0.08%	0.05%
2005 (total population)	95.01%	1.32%	1.69%	2.40%	0.95%
2005 (Hispanic only)	10.39%	0.23%	0.26%	0.10%	0.05%
Growth 2000–05 (total population)	10.37%	28.78%	2.04%	21.00%	8.53%
Growth 2000–05 (non-Hispanic only)	8.09%	23.37%	0.78%	20.69%	8.43%
Growth 2000–05 (Hispanic only)	33.30%	61.74%	9.53%	28.88%	10.45%
* AIAN is American Indian or Alaskan Native; NHPI is Native Hawaiian or Pacific Islander

The largest ancestry groups in the state are:

- 36.0% British: (27.7% English, 4.7% Scottish, 2.2% Welsh, & 1.4% Scotch Irish)
- 14.9% Scandinavian: (5.9% Danish, 4.3% Swedish, & 2.4% Norwegian)
- 12.4% German
- 7.0% American
- 6.1% Irish
- 3.9% Italian
- 3.4% Polish
- 2.2% French
- 1.3% Swiss

Utah County has the largest Icelandic American population, while Sanpete County is about a fifth (17%) Danish American. Swedish Americans and Norwegian Americans outnumbered English Americans or British Americans ancestry in Central Utah (i.e. Heber City). Finnish Americans, Polish Americans, Russian Americans and Ukrainian Americans are significant in number throughout the state (esp. Carbon County, Utah and Wasatch County, Utah areas). The Wikipedia article Utah Italians describes the state's small but established community of Italian-Americans. And the percentage of persons of Spanish Americans ancestry including those of Basque descent are also present. Most Utahns are of Northern European descent.

In the 2010 census estimates, 89.2% of the state population is white and European American. Hispanics are the next largest group with 13.0%, followed by Asians at 1.7% and Native American at 1.3%. The largest Latino group is Mexican.

== Native American tribes ==
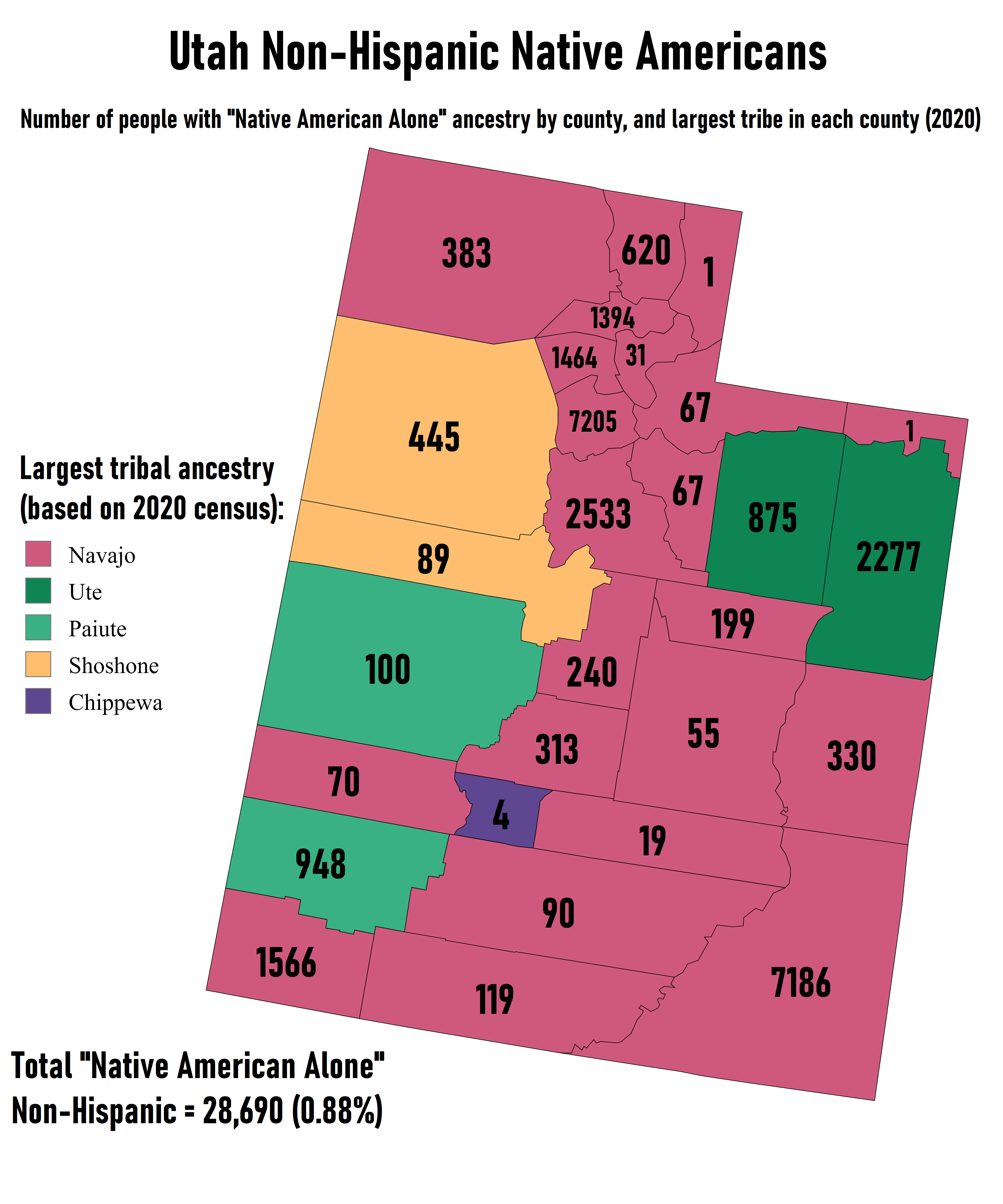
Largest Non-Hispanic Native American ancestry by county and numbers of people reporting "Native American Alone"

Utah is the traditional homeland of several Indigenous peoples, namely the Ute, Shoshone, Paiute, Bannock and Navajo. Some of their languages, like Shoshone, are still spoken in Utah. According to U.S. census data from the 2020 census, people identifying as American Indian and Alaska Native Alone make up about 1.3% of the state’s residents and in San Juan County over half of the population are Native Americans. Non-Hispanic Native Americans are less than 1% of the state's population. Today the three most populous tribes in Utah are the Navajo, Ute and Paiute.

== Languages ==
Although English is the predominant language in Utah, around 15% of the population speak a language other than English at home. Spanish is the most common non-English language, followed by other languages like Portuguese, Chinese, and various Native languages. Five Native American languages are spoken in Utah. They include Athabaskan; Navajo, or Diné bizaad; Uto-Aztecan languages such as Shoshoni (Sosoni' ta̲i̲kwappe) and Neme ta̲i̲kwappeh; Southern Paiute; and Ute (Núu-'apaghapi).

== Religion ==
Religion in Utah (2024)
1. Church of Jesus Christ of Latter-day Saints (50%)
2. Protestantism (8%)
3. Catholicism (4%)
4. Buddhist (1%)
5. New Age (1%)
6. No religion (34%)
7. Other religion (2%)

Percent Latter-day Saint by county Legend: 70-74%; 65-69%; 60-64%; 55-59%; 50-54%; 45-49%; 40-44%; 35-39%

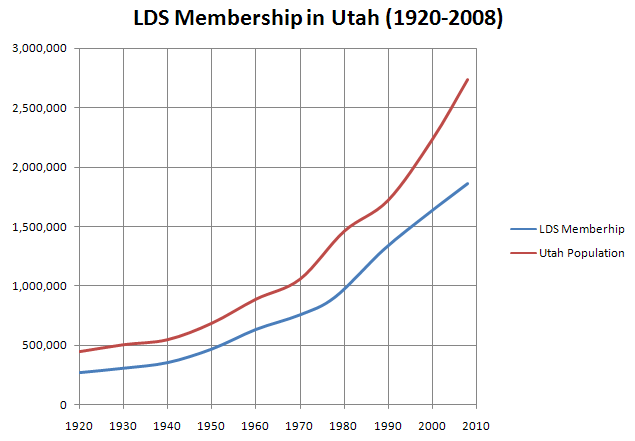
Utah LDS membership growth over the years

As of 2020, 60.68% of Utahns are reported as members of The Church of Jesus Christ of Latter-day Saints. The LDS Church has historically reported membership numbers for the state of Utah but did not do so in 2021; a church spokesperson said this was because the numbers they had did not "accurately reflect membership numbers and trends" so the current number of members that the LDS church claims in Utah is unknown.

Latter-day Saints make up about 49% (28% active) of the population in Salt Lake County, making it the fifth minority LDS county in the state, joining Carbon, San Juan, Summit, and Grand. Salt Lake County Latter-day Saints mainly reside in the southern part of the valley (Draper, South Jordan, and parts of West Jordan). Rural areas tend to have larger proportions of LDS, but nearly all counties have seen decreasing percentages affiliated with the church since 2009. Several explanations have been given to explain this decrease, such as relocation, members resigning, and a decreasing birth rate in the state. However, contrary to the declining membership trend, Utah County, home of Brigham Young University, has seen a modest uptick in membership since 2009 to nearly 85%, making it second only to Morgan County at 86.1%.

Though The Church of Jesus Christ of Latter-day Saints officially maintains a policy of neutrality in regards to political parties, the church's doctrine has a strong regional influence on politics. Another doctrine effect can be seen in Utah's high birth rate (the highest of any U.S. state, and 25 percent higher than the national average). The Latter-day Saints in Utah tend to have conservative views when it comes to most political issues and the majority of voting-age Utahns are unaffiliated voters (60%) who vote overwhelmingly Republican. John McCain polled 62.5% in the 2008 presidential election while 70.9% of Utahns opted for George W. Bush in 2004.

In 2000, the Religious Congregations and Membership Study reported that the three largest denominational groups in Utah are Latter-day Saint, Catholic, and Evangelical Protestant. The LDS Church has the highest number of adherents in Utah (at 1,493,612 members), followed by the Catholic Church with 97,085 members reported and the Southern Baptist Convention, reporting 13,258 adherents. According to a report produced by the Pew Forum on Religion & Public Life, the self-identified religious affiliations of Utahns over the age of 18 as of 2014 are:

- Christianity 73%
  - Church of Jesus Christ of Latter-day Saints 55%
  - Evangelicals 7%
  - Mainline Protestants 6%
  - Catholic 5%
  - Black Protestant Churches <1%
  - Eastern Orthodox <1%
  - Jehovah's Witnesses <1%
  - Other Christian <1%
- Unaffiliated 22%
  - Nothing in particular 18%
  - Atheist 3%
  - Agnostic 2%
- Non-Christian Faiths 4%
  - Islam 1%
  - Buddhism 1%
  - Hinduism <1%
  - Judaism <1%
  - Other World Religions 1%

== Culture ==
2012 Pew Forum on Religion & Public Life Survey	Mormons (U.S.)	U.S. Avg.
Married	75%	52%
Divorced or separated	5%	13%
Children at home (average)	2.6	1.8
Attendance at religious services (weekly or more)	88%	40%

Recently, Utah has experienced an in-migration of population from other U.S. states which served to change the state's sociocultural/political character. The percentage of Utah residents who are LDS has declined while the number of the religiously unaffiliated has increased.

The warmer climate and temperate of mid-elevation areas, like Iron, Juab, Millard, Sanpete and Washington counties, recorded increased population growth rates from the 1980s to early 2010s.

The state witnessed some splits, and sects of Mormonism are evident—Bickertonites, Church of Christ and ex-Mormons, and the FLDS fundamentalist communes—in rural communities, like Hildale (in southernmost Utah), or the nearby Arizona towns of Colorado City and Fredonia adjacent to the Arizona Strip on the state boundary with Arizona.

Utah has seen recent growth of its resident LGBTQIA+ community, which is most concentrated in the Salt Lake City metropolitan area, but present in other cities and towns, as well, such as Ogden, Logan, Herriman, Cottonwood Heights, Park City, and areas of South Jordan. According to a Gallup poll, Salt Lake City ranks among the top-ten American cities with the highest number of people identifying as lesbian, gay, bisexual, or transgender (among other identities and orientations); at around 4.7%, this is slightly more than even larger cities, including Los Angeles, California.

Utah has a high total birth rate, and the youngest population of any U.S. state.

In 2000, 49.9% females and 50.1% males constituted the gender makeup of Utah.

== Obesity rate ==
The age-adjusted percentage of Utah adults who were obese increased from 19.5% in 2000 to 28.4% in 2018. Utah ranked 40th among the 50 states and the District of Columbia.

== Vital statistics ==
Year	Population	Live births	Deaths	Natural change	Crude birth rate (per 1,000)	Crude death rate (per 1,000)	Natural change (per 1,000)	Crude migration change (per 1,000)
2000	2,244,502	47,353	12,364	34,989	21.1	5.5	15.6	
2001	2,283,715	47,959	12,662	35,297	21.0	5.5	15.5	1.7
2002	2,324,815	49,182	13,116	36,066	21.2	5.6	15.5	2.2
2003	2,360,137	49,860	13,412	36,448	21.1	5.7	15.4	-0.5
2004	2,401,580	50,670	13,331	37,339	21.1	5.6	15.5	1.7
2005	2,457,719	51,556	13,432	38,124	21.0	5.5	15.5	7.3
2006	2,525,507	53,504	13,764	39,740	21.2	5.4	15.7	11.1
2007	2,597,746	55,130	14,143	40,987	21.2	5.4	15.8	12.0
2008	2,663,029	55,634	14,040	41,594	20.9	5.3	15.6	8.9
2009	2,723,421	53,887	14,138	39,749	19.8	5.2	14.6	7.6
2010	2,776,212	52,258	14,776	37,482	18.8	5.3	13.5	5.5
2011	2,818,798	51,223	15,266	35,957	18.2	5.4	12.8	2.4
2012	2,861,360	51,465	15,676	35,789	18.0	5.5	12.5	2.4
2013	2,909,190	50,957	16,366	34,591	17.5	5.6	11.9	4.6
2014	2,951,948	51,154	16,719	34,435	17.3	5.7	11.7	2.8
2015	3,000,449	50,778	17,334	33,444	16.9	5.8	11.1	5.0
2016	3,064,277	50,464	17,913	32,551	16.5	5.8	10.6	10.2
2017	3,126,779	48,585	18,035	30,550	15.5	5.8	9.8	10.2
2018	3,181,595	47,209	18,354	28,855	14.8	5.8	9.1	8.2
2019	3,233,028	46,826	18,736	28,090	14.5	5.8	8.7	7.2
2020	3,283,970	45,702	21,497	24,205	13.9	6.5	7.4	8.1
2021	3,339,874	46,712	22,569	24,143	14.0	6.8	7.2	9.5
2022	3,393,928	45,768	21,886	23,882	13.5	6.4	7.1	8.9
2023	3,449,259	45,019	21,275	23,744	13.1	6.2	6.9	9.2
2024	3,502,983	46,664	21,499	25,165	13.3	6.1	7.2	8.2
2025	3,538,904	47,156	21,993	25,163	13.3	6.2	7.1	3.0
