= Trinity A.M.E. Church =

Historic church in Salt Lake City, Utah, U.S.

- U.S. National Register of Historic Places
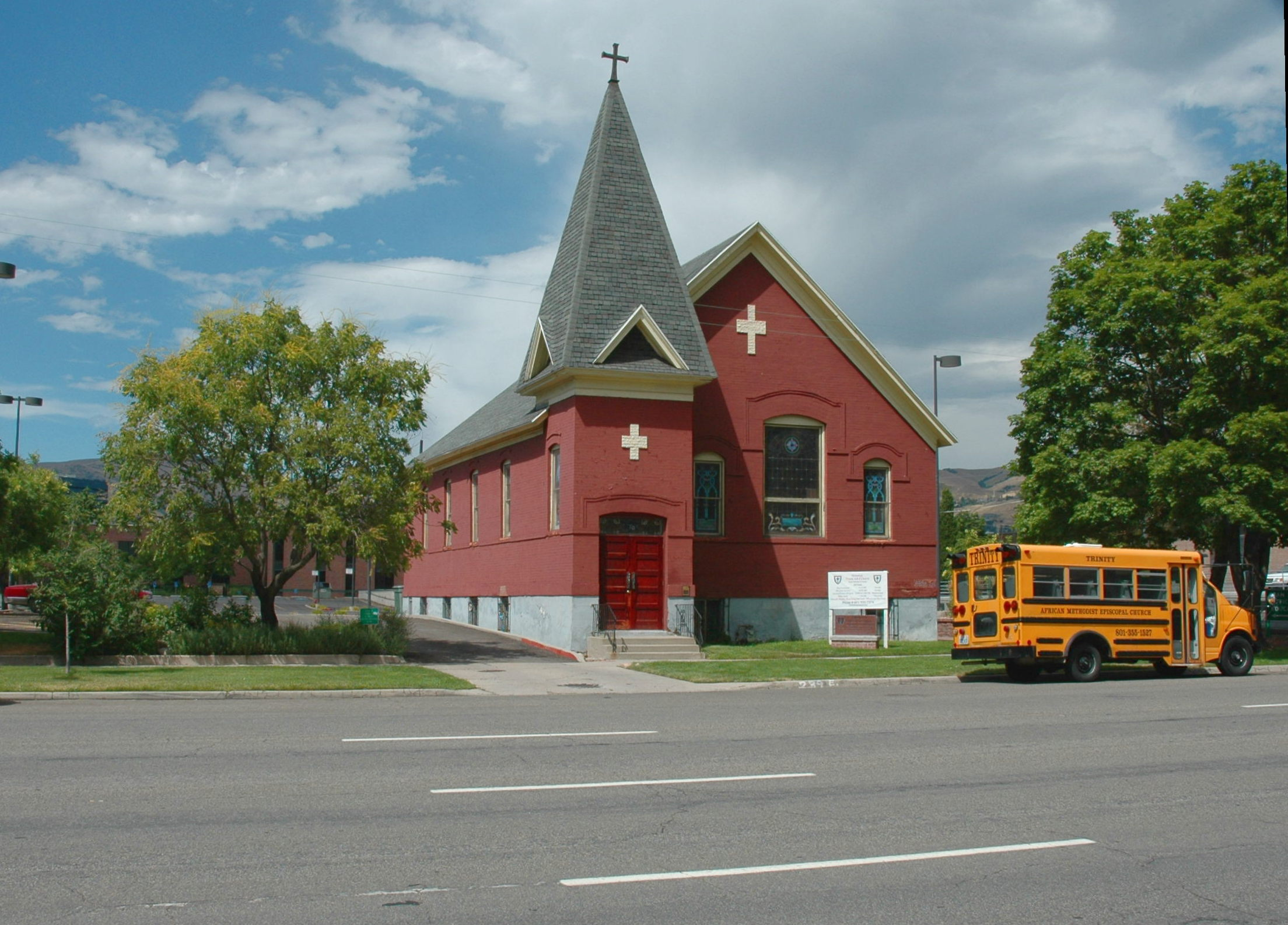

- Location within Utah Location within the United States
- Location: 239 E. 600 South, Salt Lake City, Utah
- Coordinates: 40°45′24″N 111°53′1″W
- Area: less than one acre
- Built: 1909
- Architect: Howell, Hurley
- Architectural style: Late Gothic Revival
- NRHP reference No.: 76001831
- Added to NRHP: July 30, 1976

Trinity A.M.E. Church is a historic African Methodist Episcopal Church building at 239 E. 600 South in Salt Lake City, Utah.

The Trinity A.M.E. Church was Utah's first black congregation, started in the 1880s. After years of meeting in homes and rented buildings, and one unsuccessful attempt to build a church, the congregation was able to buy this property in 1907 with money donated by Mary Bright, a cook who had made her fortune in Leadville, Colorado. The building was built in 1909 and added to the National Register of Historic Places in 1976.
