= Utah Jazz draft history =

Players of American professional basketball team

The New Orleans/Utah Jazz have selected the following players in the National Basketball Association Draft.

== Key ==
Naismith Basketball Hall of Famer	First overall NBA draft pick	Selected for an NBA All-Star Game

== Draft selections ==
Year	Round	Pick	Player	Nationality	College/High School/Club
1974	2	28	Aaron James	United States	Grambling State University
1974	3	46	Bruce King	United States	University of Texas–Pan American
1974	4	64	Ray Price	United States	University of Washington
1974	5	82	Ed Searcy	United States	St. John's University (NY)
1974	6	100	Lawrence McCray	United States	Florida State University
1974	7	118	Joel Copeland	United States	Old Dominion University
1974	8	136	Joe Piccola	United States	Roanoke College
1974	9	154	Ken Boyd	United States	Boston University
1974	10	171	Walt McGary	United States	University of Tennessee at Chattanooga
1975	1	7	Rich Kelley	United States	Stanford University
1975	3	37	Rudy Hackett	United States	Syracuse University
1975	3	38	Jim McElroy	United States	Central Michigan University
1975	4	55	Mack Coleman	United States	Houston Baptist University
1975	5	73	Andre Hampton	United States	Kentucky State University
1975	6	91	Eddie Moss	United States	Syracuse University
1975	7	109	Bill Higgins	United States	Ashland University
1975	8	127	Harvey Carmichael	United States	Kentucky State University
1975	9	145	Fred Stokes	United States	Barber–Scotia College
1975	10	161	Aleksander Belov	Soviet Union	BC Spartak Leningrad (Note: Spartak Leningrad was renamed Spartak Saint Petersburg in 1991.) (Soviet Union)
1976	2	26	Jacky Dorsey	United States	University of Georgia
1976	3	42	Steve Copp	United States	San Diego State University
1976	4	58	John Service	United States	University of California, Santa Barbara
1976	5	74	Paul Griffin	United States	Western Michigan University
1976	6	94	Barnard Tomlin	United States	Hofstra University
1976	7	111	Andy Walker	United States	Niagara University
1976	8	128	Richard Bryant	United States	Texas State University
1976	9	148	Calvin Robinson	United States	Mississippi Valley State University
1976	10	164	Art Johnson	United States	Iowa State University
1977	2	44	Essie Hollis	United States	St. Bonaventure University
1977	3	50	Tony Hanson	United States	University of Connecticut
1977	4	72	Dennis Boyd	United States	University of Detroit Mercy
1977	5	94	Jim Grady	United States	Gonzaga University
1977	6	116	Wayne Golden	United States	University of Georgia
1977	7	137	Lusia Harris	United States	Delta State University
1977	8	157	Dave Speicher	United States	University of Toledo
1978	2	44	James Hardy	United States	University of San Francisco
1978	3	50	Tommie Green	United States	Southern University
1978	4	74	Mel Davis	United States	North Texas State University
1978	4	75	Jeff Covington	United States	Youngstown State University
1978	5	96	Duck Williams	United States	University of Notre Dame
1978	6	118	John Douglas	United States	University of Kansas
1978	7	139	Willie Howard	United States	University of New Mexico
1978	8	158	Carl Kilpatrick	United States	University of Louisiana at Monroe
1978	9	175	Chad Nelson	United States	Drake University
1978	10	190	Rickey Williams	United States	California State University, Long Beach
1979	1	20	Larry Knight	United States	Loyola University Chicago
1979	2	23	Tico Brown	United States	Georgia Institute of Technology
1979	3	45	Arvid Kramer	United States	Augustana College (South Dakota)
1979	4	76	Greg Deane	United States	University of Utah
1979	5	89	Wolfe Perry	United States	Stanford University
1979	6	109	Ernie Cobb	United States	Boston College
1979	7	129	Paul Poe	United States	Louisiana College
1979	8	148	Keith McDonald	United States	Utah State University
1979	9	167	Milt Huggins	United States	Southern Illinois University
1979	10	185	Paul Dawkins	United States	Northern Illinois University
1980	1	2	Darrell Griffith	United States	University of Louisville
1980	1	19	John Duren	United States	Georgetown University
1980	4	72	Alan Taylor	United States	Brigham Young University
1980	5	94	Wally West	United States	Boston University
1980	6	118	Ken Cunningham	United States	Western Michigan University
1980	7	140	Dave Collescott	United States	University of North Carolina
1980	8	163	Jim Brandon	United States	Saint Peter's College (Note: Granted university status and became Saint Peter's University in 2012.)
1980	9	180	Paul Renfro	United States	University of Texas at Austin
1980	10	201	Leroy Coleman	United States	Middle Tennessee State University
1981	1	13	Danny Schayes	United States	Syracuse University
1981	2	27	Howard Wood	United States	University of Tennessee
1981	4	73	George Torres	Puerto Rico	Bethany Nazarene College (Note: Became Southern Nazarene University in 1986.)
1981	5	97	Mike Clark	United States	University of Oregon
1981	6	119	Kevin Sprewer	United States	Loyola University Chicago
1981	7	143	Mike Robinson	United States	Central Michigan University
1981	8	165	Bobby Cattage	United States	Auburn University
1981	9	188	Ken Ollie	United States	University of Wyoming
1981	10	207	Joe Merten	United States	University of Wisconsin–Eau Claire
1982	1	3	Dominique Wilkins	United States	University of Georgia
1982	3	49	Steve Trumbo	United States; Spain	Brigham Young University
1982	3	55	Jerry Eaves	United States	University of Louisville
1982	4	72	Mark Eaton	United States	University of California, Los Angeles
1982	5	95	Mike McKay	United States	University of Connecticut
1982	6	118	Alvin Jackson	United States	Southern University
1982	7	141	Thad Gardner	United States	University of Michigan
1982	8	164	Rick Campbell	United States	Middle Tennessee State University
1982	9	187	Riley Clarida	United States	Long Island University Brooklyn
1982	10	208	Michael Edwards	United States	University of New Orleans
1983	1	7	Thurl Bailey	United States	North Carolina State University
1983	3	54	Bob Hansen	United States	University of Iowa
1983	4	76	Doug Arnold	United States	Texas Christian
1983	5	100	Matt Clark	United States	Oklahoma State University–Stillwater
1983	6	122	Fred Gilliam	United States	Clemson University
1983	7	146	Joe (Gerald) Kazanowski (Note: Gerald Kazanowski is listed as Joe Kazanowski in most sources related to the 1983 draft.)	Canada	University of Victoria
1983	8	168	Michael McCombs	United States	College of Santa Fe (Note: Renamed Santa Fe University of Art and Design in 2001.)
1983	9	191	Ron Webb	United States	Oklahoma Christian University
1983	10	211	Odell Mosteller	United States	Auburn University
1984	1	16	John Stockton	United States	Gonzaga University
1984	3	62	David Pope	United States	Norfolk State University
1984	4	86	Jim Rowinsky	United States	Purdue University
1984	5	108	Marcus Gaither	United States	Fairleigh Dickinson University
1984	6	132	Chris Harrison	United States	West Virginia Wesleyan College
1984	7	154	Bob Evans	United States	Southern Utah University
1984	8	178	Eric Booker	United States	University of Nevada, Las Vegas
1984	9	199	Kelly Knight	United States	University of Kansas
1984	10	222	Mike Curran	United States	Niagara University
1985	1	13	Karl Malone	United States	Louisiana Tech
1985	2	37	Carey Scurry	United States	Long Island University
1985	4	83	Delaney Rudd	United States	Wake Forest University
1985	5	105	Ray Hall	United States	Canisius College
1985	6	129	Jim Miller	United States	University of Virginia
1985	7	151	Mike Wacker	United States	University of Texas at San Antonio
1986	1	15	Dell Curry	United States	Virginia Tech
1986	3	61	John Shasky	United States	University of Minnesota
1986	3	63	Bill Breeding	United States	Rocky Mountain College
1986	4	84	Marty Embry	United States	DePaul University
1986	5	107	Kerry Boagni	United States	California State University, Fullerton
1986	6	130	Chuck Everson	United States	Villanova University
1986	7	153	Mark Mitchell	United States	University of Hartford
1987	1	15	José Ortiz	Puerto Rico	Oregon State University
1987	3	61	Clarence Martin	United States	Western Kentucky University
1987	3	68	Billy Donovan	United States	Providence College
1987	4	84	Reuben Holmes	United States	Alabama State University
1987	5	107	Bart Kofoed	United States	University of Nebraska at Kearney
1987	6	130	Art Sabb	United States	Bloomfield College
1987	7	153	Keith Webster	United States	Harvard University
1988	1	17	Eric Leckner	United States	University of Wyoming
1988	2	42	Jeff Moe	United States	University of Iowa
1988	3	67	Ricky Grace	United States	University of Oklahoma
1989	1	21	Blue Edwards	United States	East Carolina University
1989	2	48	Junie Lewis	United States	University of South Alabama
1990	2	33	Walter Palmer	United States	Dartmouth College
1991	1	21	Eric Murdock	United States	Providence College
1991	2	48	Isaac Austin	United States	Arizona State University
1993	1	18	Luther Wright	United States	Seton Hall University
1993	2	45	Bryon Russell	United States	California State University, Long Beach
1994	2	47	Jamie Watson	United States	University of South Carolina
1995	1	28	Greg Ostertag	United States	University of Kansas
1996	1	25	Martin Müürsepp	Estonia	BC Tallinna Kalev (Estonia)
1996	2	54	Shandon Anderson	United States	University of Georgia
1997	1	27	Jacque Vaughn	United States	University of Kansas
1997	2	58	Nate Erdmann	United States	University of Oklahoma
1998	1	29	Nazr Mohammed	United States	University of Kentucky
1998	2	57	Torraye Braggs	United States	Xavier University
1999	1	19	Quincy Lewis	United States	University of Minnesota
1999	1	24	Andrei Kirilenko	Russia	PBC CSKA Moscow (Russia) (Note: Until 2010, the Russian Super League was the pre-eminent league in Russian professional basketball.)
1999	1	28	Scott Padgett	United States	University of Kentucky
1999	2	58	Eddie Lucas	United States	Virginia Tech
2000	1	23	DeShawn Stevenson	United States	Washington Union High School (Easton, CA)
2000	2	50	Kaniel Dickens	United States	University of Idaho
2001	1	24	Raül López	Spain	Real Madrid Baloncesto (Spain)
2001	2	52	Jarron Collins	United States	Stanford University
2002	1	19	Ryan Humphrey	United States	University of Notre Dame
2002	2	46	Jamal Sampson	United States	University of California
2003	1	19	Sasha Pavlović	Serbia	KK Budućnost (Montenegro)
2003	2	47	Mo Williams	United States	University of Alabama
2004	1	14	Kris Humphries	United States	University of Minnesota
2004	1	16	Kirk Snyder	United States	University of Nevada, Reno
2004	1	21	Pavel Podkolzin	Russia	Metis Varese (Italy)
2005	1	3	Deron Williams	United States	University of Illinois at Urbana–Champaign
2005	2	34	C. J. Miles	United States	Skyline High School (Dallas)
2005	2	51	Robert Whaley	United States	Walsh University
2006	1	14	Ronnie Brewer	United States	University of Arkansas
2006	2	46	Dee Brown	United States	University of Illinois at Urbana–Champaign
2006	2	47	Paul Millsap	United States	Louisiana Tech University
2007	1	25	Morris Almond	United States	Rice University
2007	2	55	Herbert Hill	United States	Providence College
2008	1	23	Kosta Koufos	Greece (Note: Kosta Koufos was born and raised in the United States to Greek parents. He has represented Greece internationally.)	Ohio State University
2008	2	44	Ante Tomić	Croatia	KK Zagreb (Croatia)
2008	2	46	Tadija Dragićević	Serbia	Red Star Belgrade (Serbia)
2009	1	20	Eric Maynor	United States	Virginia Commonwealth University
2009	2	50	Goran Suton	Bosnia and Herzegovina; United States (Note: Goran Suton, who was born in Bosnia and Herzegovina, is also a naturalized citizen of the United States since 2006.)	Michigan State University
2010	1	9	Gordon Hayward	United States	Butler University
2010	2	55	Jeremy Evans	United States	Western Kentucky University
2011	1	3	Enes Kanter	Turkey (Note: Enes Kanter was born in Switzerland to Turkish parents. He has represented Turkey internationally at youth level.)	University of Kentucky (Note: Although Enes Kanter enrolled at Kentucky, he never played because he was ruled ineligible to play by the NCAA for receiving financial benefits from his previous Turkish team, Fenerbahçe Ülker, during the 2008–09 season.)
2011	1	12	Alec Burks	United States	University of Colorado
2012	2	47	Kevin Murphy	United States	Tennessee Technological University
2013	1	14	Shabazz Muhammad	United States	UCLA
2013	1	21	Gorgui Dieng	Senegal	University of Louisville
2013	2	46	Erick Green	United States	Virginia Tech
2014	1	5	Dante Exum	Australia	Australian Institute of Sport (Note: Dante Exum attended the Australian Institute of Sport in conjunction with attending and playing high school basketball for Lake Ginninderra Secondary College until January 2014.)
2014	1	23	Rodney Hood	United States	Duke University
2014	2	35	Jarnell Stokes	United States	University of Tennessee
2015	1	12	Trey Lyles	Canada	University of Kentucky
2015	2	42	Olivier Hanlan	Canada	Boston College
2015	2	54	Dani Díez	Spain	San Sebastián Gipuzkoa BC (Spain)
2016	1	12	Taurean Prince	United States	Baylor University
2016	2	42	Isaiah Whitehead	United States	Seton Hall University
2016	2	52	Joel Bolomboy	Ukraine (Note: Joel Bolomboy was born in Russia to a Congolese father and a Russian mother. He has represented Ukraine internationally.)	Weber State University
2016	2	55	Marcus Paige	United States	University of North Carolina
2016	2	60	Tyrone Wallace	United States	University of California
2017	1	24	Tyler Lydon	United States	Syracuse University
2017	1	30	Josh Hart	United States	Villanova University
2017	2	42	Thomas Bryant	United States	Indiana University
2017	2	55	Nigel Williams-Goss	United States	Gonzaga University
2018	1	21	Grayson Allen	United States	Duke University
2018	2	52	Vincent Edwards	United States	Purdue University
2019	1	23	Darius Bazley	United States	Princeton HS
2019	2	53	Justin Wright-Foreman	United States	Hofstra University
2020	1	27	Udoka Azubuike	Nigeria	University of Kansas
2020	2	38	Saben Lee	United States	Vanderbilt University
2021	1	30	Santi Aldama	Spain	Loyola University Maryland
2023	1	9	Taylor Hendricks	United States	University of Central Florida
2023	1	16	Keyonte George	United States	Baylor University
2023	1	28	Brice Sensabaugh	United States	Ohio State University
2024	1	10	Cody Williams	United States	University of Colorado
2024	1	29	Isaiah Collier	United States	University of Southern California
2024	2	32	Kyle Filipowski	United States	Duke University
2025	1	5	Ace Bailey	United States	Rutgers University
2025	1	18	Walter Clayton Jr.	United States	University of Florida
2025	2	53	John Tonje	United States	University of Wisconsin
2026	1	2	Darryn Peterson	United States	University of Kansas
