= Up and Coming =

Up and Coming may refer to:

- Up and Coming (TV series), an American television drama series
- Up and Coming (album), a 2017 album by John Abercrombie
- Up and Coming Stakes, an Australian horse race
- Up and Coming Tour, a concert tour by Paul McCartney
