= 1980 Honda Hagibis season =

- Head coach: Alberto Reynoso

Open Conference results
- Record: 5–13 (27.8%)
- Place: 8th
- Playoff finish: N/A

Invitational Championship results
- Record: 0–0
- Place: N/A
- Playoff finish: N/A

All Filipino Conference results
- Record: 4–9 (30.8%)
- Place: N/A
- Playoff finish: N/A

Honda Hagibis seasons

The 1980 Honda Hagibis season was the 6th season of the franchise in the Philippine Basketball Association (PBA). The team was known as Honda Motorbike Makers in the Third Conference.

== Transactions ==
The Hagibis signed a total of five rookies, Oliveros Dalman, Monico Martinez and Roberto Poblete were all teammates at Imperial Textile Mills in the MICAA, along with Frederick Adams and Redentor Vicente.

== Summary ==
Honda were reinforced by Byron "Snake" Jones, who was on his third PBA team after playing for Toyota and U-Tex, and Charles "Buster" Matheney. The Hagibis won their first two games in the Open Conference, spoiling the debut of new team Tefilin, 95–94, in the first game of the season on March 16. Honda scored their second win against Tanduay, 115–97 on March 22. They lost 13 of their remaining 16 games in the elimination phase from thereon.

Honda won their first three outings and raced to a 4-1 won-loss slate in the All-Filipino Conference. The Motorbike Makers lost their last four assignments in the elimination phase and were forced into a playoff against U-Tex for the sixth and last qualifying berth in the round of six. Honda lost to U-Tex in a knockout game on November 13. They dropped all their three matches in the round-robin among the four non-qualifiers in the quarterfinals.

== Win–loss record vs opponents ==
Teams	Win	Loss	1st (Open)	3rd (All-Filipino)
Galleon Shippers	1	3	0-2	1-1
Gilbey's Gin	1	2	0-2	1-0
Great Taste / Presto	1	3	0-2	1-1
Royal / San Miguel	1	2	1-1	0-1
Tanduay	1	2	1-1	0-1
Tefilin	2	2	1-1	1-1
Toyota Tamaraws	1	2	1-1	0-1
U-Tex Wranglers	1	3	1-1	0-2
Walk Tall / Crispa	0	3	0-2	0-1
Total	9	22	5-13	4-9

== Roster ==
Honda Hagibis roster
Players
Coaches

Pos.	No.	Nat.	Name	Ht.	Wt.
G	1	(Philippines)	Alejandrito Miego	5 ft 6 in (1.68 m)		Southwestern-U
G	6	(Philippines)	Emamanuel Chan	6 ft 2 in (1.88 m)		Baguio
F	7	(Philippines)	Frederick Adams	6 ft 0 in (1.83 m)		TUA
F	8	(Philippines)	Teofilo Dela Cruz	5 ft 11 in (1.80 m)		Southwestern-U
G	9	(Philippines)	Oliveros Dalman	6 ft 3 in (1.91 m)		Visayas
G	13	(Philippines)	Mario Marasigan	5 ft 11 in (1.80 m)		UST
G	14	(Philippines)	Jesse Sullano	5 ft 9 in (1.75 m)		Southwestern-U
F	16	(Philippines)	Ronnie Albor	6 ft 2 in (1.88 m)		Southwestern-U
G/F	17	(Philippines)	Roberto Poblete	6 ft 3 in (1.91 m)		Adamson
F	18	(Philippines)	Cristino Reynoso	6 ft 1 in (1.85 m)		Far Eastern
F	22	(Philippines)	Monico Martinez	6 ft 2 in (1.88 m)		PSBA
C	33	(United States)	Byron Jones (I)	6 ft 9 in (2.06 m)		San Francisco
F/C	35	(United States)	Buster Matheney (I)	6 ft 8 in (2.03 m)		Utah
C	45	(Philippines)	Redentor Vicente	6 ft 5 in (1.96 m)		José Rizal

Head coach

- (Philippines) Alberto Reynoso

Assistant coach(es)

Legend

- (C) Team captain
- (I) Import
- Injured
