= Mike Niles =

American basketball player

Personal information
- Born: March 31, 1955 (age 71) Los Angeles, California, U.S.
- Listed height: 6 ft 6 in (1.98 m)
- Listed weight: 225 lb (102 kg)

Career information
- High school: Jefferson (Los Angeles, California)
- College: Cal State Fullerton (1976–1979)
- NBA draft: 1979: 4th round, 83rd overall pick
- Drafted by: Philadelphia 76ers
- Playing career: 1979–1981
- Position: Small forward
- Number: 40

Career history
- 1979–1980: Lancaster Red Roses
- 1980–1981: Phoenix Suns
- Stats at NBA.com
- Stats at Basketball Reference

Michael Donnell Niles (born March 31, 1955) is an American former professional basketball player. He played college basketball for the Cal State Fullerton Titans and was selected in the fourth round of the 1979 NBA draft by the Philadelphia 76ers. Niles began his professional career with the Lancaster Red Roses in the Continental Basketball Association (CBA) during the 1979–80 season. He played in the National Basketball Association (NBA) with the Phoenix Suns during the 1980–81 season.

In 1989, Niles was sentenced to life imprisonment for orchestrating the murder of his wife in a 1984 shooting.

== Early life ==
Niles was the second youngest of 13 children and his dad died when he was an infant. When he was aged 8, he broke both of his legs when he fell off a bike. Niles' mother died when he was 12 and he became an orphan who endured homelessness and slept in alleyways. He joined an inner-city gang the following year. Niles developed a reputation for an intimidating hardness which was forged from years of fending for himself.

Niles attended Jefferson High School in Los Angeles, California, and was a multi-sport standout. He was selected as most valuable player for the basketball team during his senior season when Jefferson won the city championship.

In 1975, Niles was mistakenly identified as a suspect in a robbery at a Fullerton supermarket. He was involved in an altercation with two security guards which left him with a broken jaw, a broken rib, permanent bumps over his head and a gash on his right forearm that was so severe he almost lost his arm. Niles was later cleared by authorities.

== College career ==
Niles did not attempt to enter college until two years after his graduation from high school. He was recommended to enrol at California State University, Fullerton by a cousin because of its Equal Opportunities Program. Niles played college basketball for the Cal State Fullerton Titans. He averaged 12.4 points per game during his three seasons. Niles was removed from the team before his senior year because of academic troubles and did not graduate.

== Professional career ==
Niles was selected in the fourth round of the 1979 NBA draft by the Philadelphia 76ers. He began his career with the Lancaster Red Roses of the Continental Basketball Association (CBA). Niles requested to get medical care in Los Angeles for a badly sprained ankle but was suspended and eventually released when he attempted to rejoin the team. He returned to Los Angeles where he pushed himself to a daily routine which consisted of running 5 miles and playing basketball for numerous hours.

Niles then attended training camp with the Phoenix Suns where he impressed the team with his hustle and stamina. Niles was offered a one-year contract to play for the Suns in 1980. He averaged 2.6 points and 1.3 rebounds per game during his one season with the Suns.

== Murder of Sonja Niles ==
Niles married his college sweetheart, Sonja, and they rented a home in Corona, California. Sonja worked as a prison guard at the California Institution for Women. Struggling to find work after his basketball career, Niles was frustrated that his wife was supporting him and grew jealous of her career.

On December 13, 1984, Niles orchestrated a plan to kill Sonja and offered a $5,000 reward from a $100,000 insurance policy. He met an armed gang member, Noel "No-No" Jackson, and left him in his Corona house. Niles feigned an argument with Sonja after she returned home from work and stormed out. While Niles waited outside, Jackson took Sonja by surprise and she ran out of the house. Jackson caught up with her across the street and shoved the barrel of his 12-gauge shotgun against the back of her skull; the force of the blast blew Sonja's head off. A neighbor recognised Niles' car as it drove off from the scene. Niles was arrested the following day.

During the trial, Niles and Jackson accused each other of the murder; Jackson's jury found that he was the gunman. A friend of Niles testified that he wanted Sonja killed because she had "messed with him when he was playing basketball." On January 24, 1989, Niles was convicted for the murder of Sonja. Jackson was also convicted of murder and sentenced to death. Jurors were shown highlights from Niles' basketball career in an attempt to save him from the death penalty. Niles was spared from the death penalty but was sentenced to life in prison without the possibility of parole.

== Personal life ==
Niles' son from a previous relationship, Brandon, was an infant when Niles left him. Brandon did not know what had happened to his father until he found out about Niles' conviction for murder in 1989. On September 26, 1992, Brandon was fatally shot by an unidentified assailant while he talked to his girlfriend at a phone booth.

== Career statistics ==
Legend
| GP | Games played | GS | Games started | MPG | Minutes per game |
| FG% | Field goal percentage | 3P% | 3-point field goal percentage | FT% | Free throw percentage |
| RPG | Rebounds per game | APG | Assists per game | SPG | Steals per game |
| BPG | Blocks per game | PPG | Points per game | **Bold** | Career high |

=== NBA ===
==== Regular season ====
| Year | Team | GP | MPG | FG% | 3P% | FT% | RPG | APG | SPG | BPG | PPG |
|---|---|---|---|---|---|---|---|---|---|---|---|
| 1980–81 | Phoenix | 44 | 5.3 | .348 | .500 | .459 | 1.3 | .3 | .2 | .0 | 2.6 |

==== Playoffs ====
| Year | Team | GP | MPG | FG% | 3P% | FT% | RPG | APG | SPG | BPG | PPG |
|---|---|---|---|---|---|---|---|---|---|---|---|
| 1980 | Phoenix | 2 | 2.0 | .000 | – | – | .0 | .0 | .5 | .0 | .0 |
