= Brett Vroman =

American basketball player

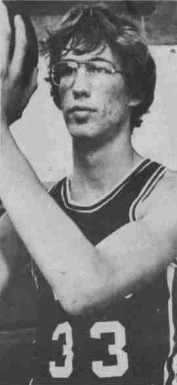
- Vroman in 1973 as a member of the Provo High School basketball team.

Personal information
- Born: December 25, 1955 (age 70) Hollywood, California, U.S.
- Listed height: 7 ft 0 in (2.13 m)
- Listed weight: 220 lb (100 kg)

Career information
- High school: Provo (Provo, Utah)
- College: UCLA (1974–1977); UNLV (1978–1979)
- NBA draft: 1978: 4th round, 87th overall pick
- Drafted by: Philadelphia 76ers
- Playing career: 1980–1989
- Position: Center
- Number: 52

Career history
- 1980: Utah Jazz
- 1980–1981: Billings Volcanos
- 1981–1983: Sapori Siena
- 1983–1984: Italcable Perugia
- 1984–1985: Pepper Mestre
- 1985: Aris
- 1985–1986: Segafredo Gorizia
- 1987: Wuber Napoli
- 1988–1989: Torpan Pojat

Career highlights
- NCAA champion (1975); First-team Parade All-American (1974)
- Stats at NBA.com
- Stats at Basketball Reference

Brett Grant Vroman (born December 25, 1955) is an American former professional basketball player. A 7'0" 220 lb center, he played college basketball for the UCLA Bruins and UNLV Runnin' Rebels. His professional career included a brief stint with the NBA's Utah Jazz and 12 years playing in Europe.

Vroman was selected by the Philadelphia 76ers with the 21st pick in the fourth round of the 1978 NBA draft but never made the team. On July 27, 1980, he signed as a free agent with the Utah Jazz for whom he played 11 games in 1980–81, averaging 3.1 points, 2.3 rebounds and 0.8 assist per game. After ending his NBA career, he played in Europe, mostly in Italy.

He is the father of the late Jackson Vroman, who was selected by the Chicago Bulls in the 2004 NBA draft and played with the Phoenix Suns and the New Orleans Hornets / New Orleans/Oklahoma City Hornets from 2004 to 2006.

== Career statistics ==
Legend
GP	Games played	GS	Games started	MPG	Minutes per game
FG%	Field goal percentage	3P%	3-point field goal percentage	FT%	Free throw percentage
RPG	Rebounds per game	APG	Assists per game	SPG	Steals per game
BPG	Blocks per game	PPG	Points per game	**Bold**	Career high

=== NBA ===
==== Regular season ====
Year	Team	GP	MPG	FG%	3P%	FT%	RPG	APG	SPG	BPG	PPG
1980–81	Utah	11	8.5	.370	.000	.737	2.3	.8	.5	.5	3.1
