= James Bradley (basketball) =

American basketball player (1955–2023)

Personal information
- Born: November 7, 1955 Memphis, Tennessee, U.S.
- Died: April 12, 2023 (aged 67) Memphis, Tennessee, U.S.
- Listed height: 6 ft 8 in (2.03 m)
- Listed weight: 202 lb (92 kg)

Career information
- High school: Melrose (Memphis, Tennessee)
- College: Connors State (1975–1976); Memphis (1976–1979)
- NBA draft: 1979: 2nd round, 35th overall pick
- Drafted by: Atlanta Hawks
- Playing career: 1979–1980
- Position: Forward

Career history
- 1979–1980: Pallacanestro Trieste

Career highlights
- 2× First-team All-Metro Conference (1978, 1979); Fourth-team Parade All-American (1975)
- Stats at Basketball Reference

James Bradley Jr. (November 7, 1955 – April 12, 2023) was an American basketball player. He played college basketball for the Connors State Cowboys and Memphis Tigers. Bradley was a second round selection of the 1979 NBA draft by the Atlanta Hawks.

== Playing career ==
Bradley played at Melrose High School in Memphis, Tennessee, where he won a Tennessee state basketball championship and went undefeated during his junior season. His jersey was retired by the school on February 13, 2023.

Bradley played one season collegiately for the Connors State Cowboys, where he was an NJCAA Honorable Mention selection in 1976, before he transferred to play for his hometown Memphis Tigers. He was a two-time first-team All-Metro selection and led the Tigers in rebounding during his final two seasons.

Bradley was selected in the 1979 NBA draft as the 35th overall pick by the Atlanta Hawks but never played in the National Basketball Association (NBA).

== Death ==
Bradley died in Memphis, Tennessee, on April 12, 2023, at the age of 67.

== Career statistics ==
Legend
GP	Games played	GS	Games started	MPG	Minutes per game
FG%	Field goal percentage	3P%	3-point field goal percentage	FT%	Free throw percentage
RPG	Rebounds per game	APG	Assists per game	SPG	Steals per game
BPG	Blocks per game	PPG	Points per game	**Bold**	Career high

=== College ===
Year	Team	GP	GS	MPG	FG%	3P%	FT%	RPG	APG	SPG	BPG	PPG
1976–77	Memphis	**29**	–	30.1	.446	–	**.795**	8.7	2.5	–	–	15.3
1977–78	Memphis	28	–	**31.7**	.455	–	.786	**9.8**	–	–	–	**18.3**
1978–79	Memphis	19	–	29.4	**.465**	–	.737	9.2	**3.8**	**1.9**	**1.3**	15.7
Career		76	–	30.5	.454	–	.777	9.2	–	–	–	16.5
