= Michael Vicens =

Puerto Rican basketball player

Personal information
- Born: 21 January 1956 (age 70) Ponce, Puerto Rico
- Listed height: 6 ft 5 in (1.96 m)
- Listed weight: 190 lb (86 kg)

Career information
- College: Holy Cross (1974–1978)
- NBA draft: 1978: 10th round, 187th overall pick
- Drafted by: New Jersey Nets
- Position: Guard
- Stats at Basketball Reference

Michael Vicens (born 21 January 1956) is a Puerto Rican former basketball player. He competed in the men's tournament at the 1976 Summer Olympics.
