= Myles Patrick =

American basketball player

Personal information
- Born: November 19, 1954 (age 71) Macon, Georgia, U.S.
- Listed height: 6 ft 8 in (2.03 m)
- Listed weight: 220 lb (100 kg)

Career information
- High school: Southwest (Macon, Georgia)
- College: Auburn (1974–1978)
- NBA draft: 1978: undrafted
- Position: Small forward
- Number: 34

Career history
- 1980: Los Angeles Lakers
- Stats at NBA.com
- Stats at Basketball Reference

Myles Patrick (born November 19, 1954, in Macon, Georgia) is an American former professional basketball player.

A 6'8" small forward from Auburn University, Patrick played one season (1980–81) in the National Basketball Association (NBA) for the Los Angeles Lakers. He played three games, scoring five points (1.7 points per game) over nine minutes (3.0 minutes per game). He has recently worked as a midnight basketball coordinator in his hometown of Macon.

== Basketball career ==
As a four-year letterman at Auburn University, Patrick wound up his collegiate career ranked sixth in Auburn's all-time rebounding standings and 14th in the scoring list. Patrick averaged 8.3 points and 6.5 rebounds in 105 total games for Auburn. Aside from seeing action with the Los Angeles Lakers in 1980–81, he performed with the Montana Sky in the defunct Western Basketball Association and the Maine Lumberjacks in the Continental Basketball Association. Patrick averaged 15 points and six rebounds for the Lakers' entry in the Southern California Summer Pro League in 1980 before suffering a fractured jaw.

== Career statistics ==
Legend
| GP | Games played | GS | Games started | MPG | Minutes per game |
| FG% | Field goal percentage | 3P% | 3-point field goal percentage | FT% | Free throw percentage |
| RPG | Rebounds per game | APG | Assists per game | SPG | Steals per game |
| BPG | Blocks per game | PPG | Points per game | **Bold** | Career high |

=== NBA ===
==== Regular season ====
| Year | Team | GP | MPG | FG% | 3P% | FT% | RPG | APG | SPG | BPG | PPG |
|---|---|---|---|---|---|---|---|---|---|---|---|
| 1980–81 | L.A. Lakers | 3 | 3.0 | .400 | – | .500 | .7 | .3 | .0 | .0 | 1.7 |
