= 1979 NBA draft =

Basketball player selection

General information
- Sport: Basketball
- Date: June 25, 1979
- Location: Plaza Hotel (New York City, New York)

Overview
- 202 total selections in 10 rounds
- League: NBA
- First selection: Magic Johnson (Los Angeles Lakers)
- Hall of Famers: 3: G Magic Johnson; G Sidney Moncrief; G Nikos Galis

The 1979 NBA draft was the 33rd annual draft of the National Basketball Association (NBA), held at the Plaza Hotel in New York City on Monday, June 25. In this draft, the 22 NBA teams took turns selecting amateur U.S. college basketball players and other eligible players, including international players; it went ten rounds and selected 202 players.

The first two picks in the draft belonged to the teams that finished last in each conference, with the order determined by a coin flip. The Los Angeles Lakers, who obtained the New Orleans Jazz's first-round pick in a trade, won the coin flip and were awarded the first overall pick, while the Chicago Bulls were awarded the second pick. The remaining first-round picks and the subsequent rounds were assigned to teams in reverse order of their win–loss record in the previous season. A player who had finished his four-year college eligibility was eligible for selection.

If a player left college early, he would not be eligible for selection until his college class graduated. Larry Bird would have been eligible to join this draft class because his "junior eligible" draft status from being taken by Boston in 1978 would expire the minute the 1979 draft began, but Bird and the Celtics agreed on a five-year contract on June 8 to avoid that. Before the draft, five college underclassmen were declared eligible for selection under the "hardship" rule. These players had applied and gave evidence of financial hardship to the league, which granted them the right to start earning their living by starting their professional careers earlier. Prior to the draft, the Jazz relocated from New Orleans to Salt Lake City and became the Utah Jazz.

== Draft selections and draftee career notes ==
Magic Johnson from NCAA champion Michigan State University, one of the "hardship" players, was selected first overall by the Los Angeles Lakers. Johnson, who had just finished his sophomore season in college, became the first underclassman to be drafted first overall. He went on to win the NBA championship with the Lakers in his rookie season. He also won the Finals Most Valuable Player Award, becoming the first rookie ever to win the award. He spent his entire 13-year career with the Lakers and won five NBA championships. He also won three Most Valuable Player Awards, three Finals Most Valuable Player Awards, ten consecutive All-NBA Team selections and twelve All-Star Game selections. For his achievements, he has been inducted to the Basketball Hall of Fame. He was also named to the list of the 50 Greatest Players in NBA History announced at the league's 50th anniversary in 1996. After retiring as a player, Johnson went on to have a brief coaching career as an interim head coach of the Lakers in 1994.

Sidney Moncrief, the fifth pick, won two Defensive Player of the Year Awards and was selected to five consecutive All-NBA Teams, five consecutive All-Defensive Teams and five consecutive All-Star Games. In "The Book of Basketball", Bill Simmons noted that then-Lakers head coach Jerry West had actually wanted to trade down from the #1 pick and use it to get Moncrief along with more players and picks, but Jerry Buss vetoed West's plans because Buss wanted Magic to be the new face of the team he was just finishing his full purchase of. Jim Paxson, the twelfth pick, was selected to one All-NBA Team and two All-Star Games. Bill Cartwright, the third pick, won three consecutive NBA championships with the Chicago Bulls from 1991 through 1993. He also had one All-Star Game selection, which occurred in his rookie season. He then became the Bulls' head coach for three seasons. Bill Laimbeer, the 65th pick, won two NBA championships with the Detroit Pistons in 1989 and 1990 and was selected to four All-Star Games. After retiring, he coached the Detroit Shock of the Women's National Basketball Association (WNBA) for eight seasons, leading them to three WNBA championships in 2003, 2006 and 2008. Mark Eaton, who had only completed one year of college basketball, was selected by the Phoenix Suns with the 107th pick. He opted to return to college basketball and later joined the NBA in 1982, after he was drafted again by the Utah Jazz in the 1982 draft. During his eleven-year career with the Jazz, he won two Defensive Player of the Year Awards and was selected to five consecutive All-Defensive Team and one All-Star Game. Two other players from this draft, eighth pick Calvin Natt and 73rd pick James Donaldson, were also selected to one All-Star Game each.

In the fourth round, the Boston Celtics selected Nick Galis from Seton Hall University with the 68th pick. However, he suffered a serious injury in the training camp and was waived by the Celtics before the season started. Galis, who was born in the United States to Greek parents, opted to play in Greece. He never played in the NBA and spent all of his professional career in Greece, where he helped the country emerge as an international basketball power. He won a Eurobasket title, 8 Greek championships, 7 Greek cups as well as numerous personal honors and awards. He has been inducted into both the FIBA Hall of Fame and the Naismith Memorial Basketball Hall of Fame.

== Draft ==
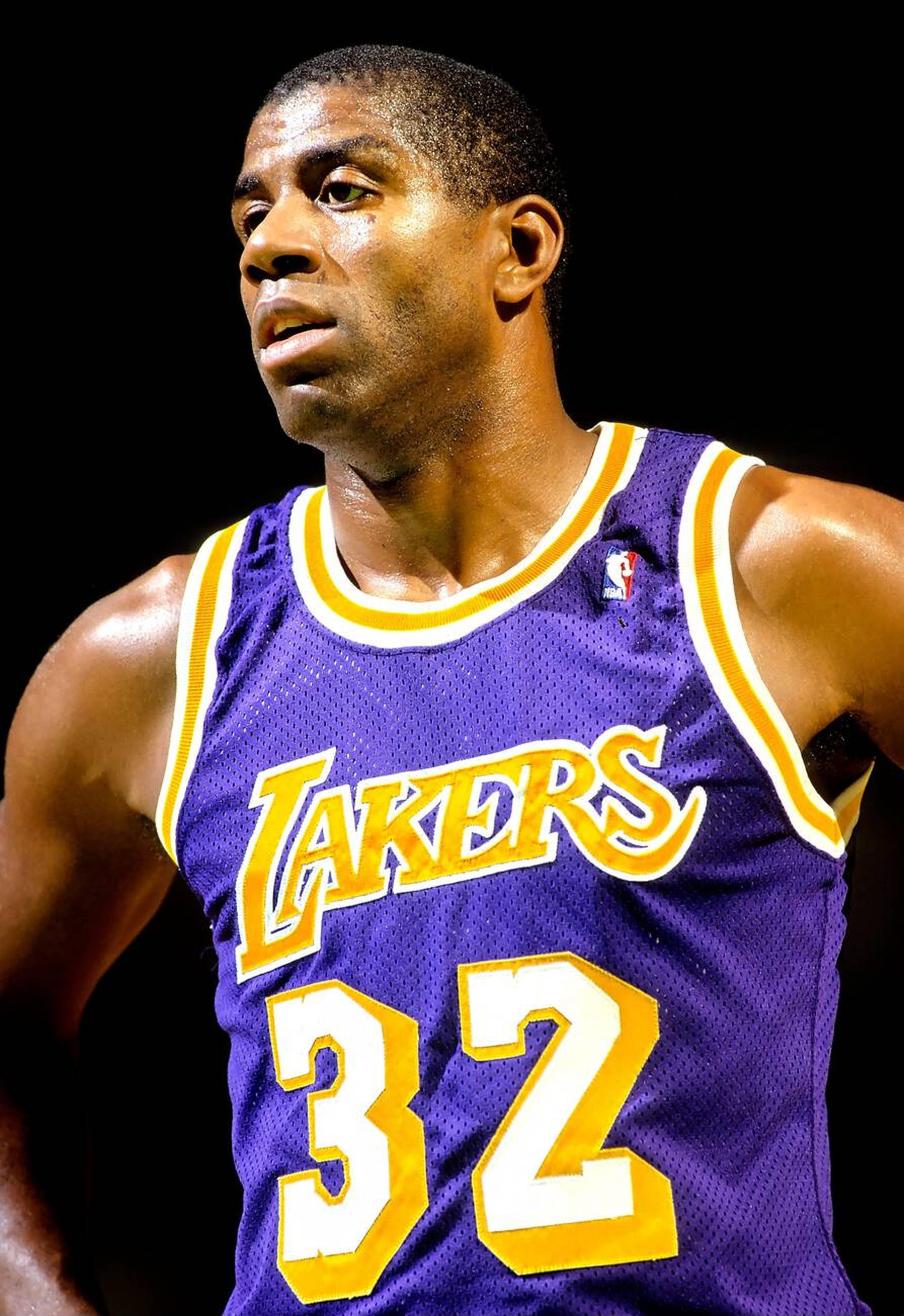
Magic Johnson was selected 1st overall by the Los Angeles Lakers.

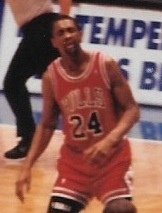
Bill Cartwright was selected 3rd overall by the New York Knicks.

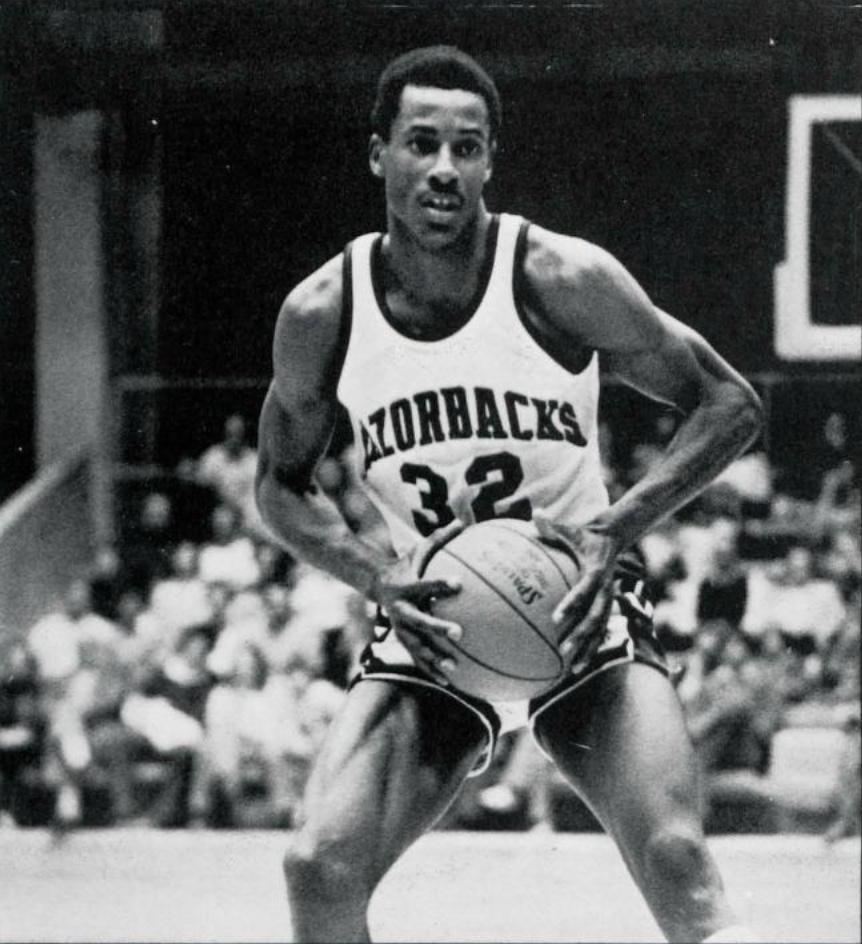
Sidney Moncrief was selected 5th overall by the Milwaukee Bucks.

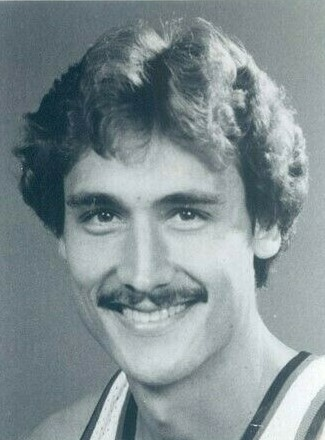
Jim Paxson was selected 12th overall by the Portland Trail Blazers.

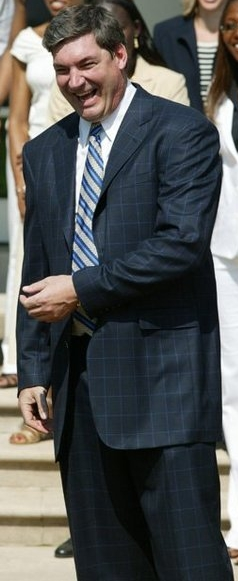
Bill Laimbeer was selected 65th overall by the Cleveland Cavaliers.

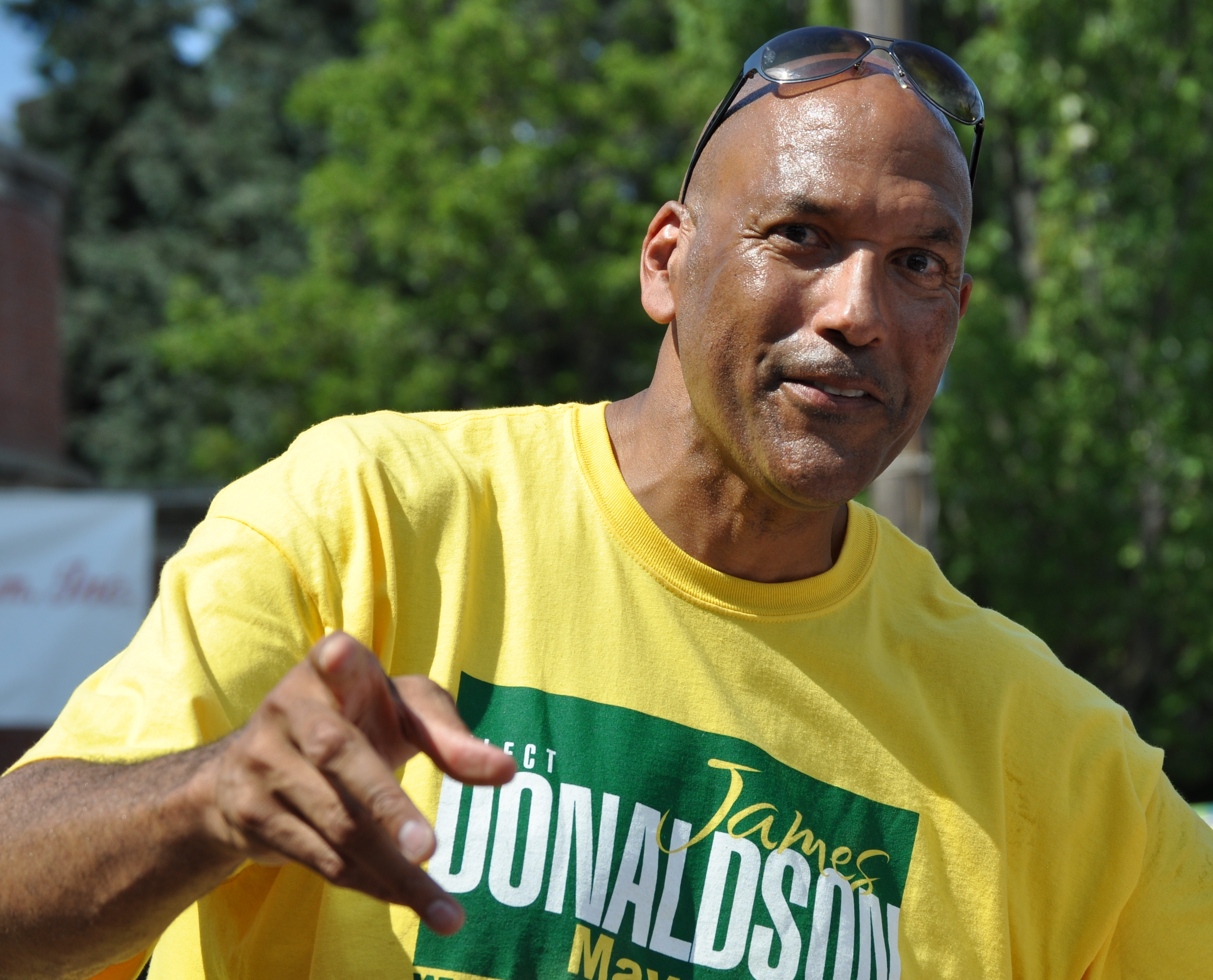
James Donaldson was selected 73rd overall by the Seattle SuperSonics.

Pos.	G	F	C
Position	Guard	Forward	Center

^	Denotes player who has been inducted to the Naismith Memorial Basketball Hall of Fame
*	Denotes player who has been selected for at least one All-Star Game and All-NBA Team
^{+}	Denotes player who has been selected for at least one All-Star Game
^{#}	Denotes player who has never appeared in an NBA regular-season or playoff game

Rnd.	Pick	Player	Pos.	Nationality (Note: Nationality indicates the player's national team or representative nationality. If a player has not competed at the international level, then the nationality indicates the national team which the player is eligible to represent according to FIBA rules.)	Team	School / club team
1	1	Magic Johnson^	G/F	United States	Los Angeles Lakers (from Utah)^{[a]}	Michigan State (So.)
1	2	David Greenwood	F/C	United States	Chicago Bulls	UCLA (Sr.)
1	3	Bill Cartwright^{+}	C	United States	New York Knicks (from Boston)^{[b]}	San Francisco (Sr.)
1	4	Greg Kelser	F	United States	Detroit Pistons	Michigan State (Sr.)
1	5	Sidney Moncrief^	G	United States	Milwaukee Bucks (from Cleveland)	Arkansas (Sr.)
1	6	James Bailey	F/C	United States	Seattle SuperSonics (from New York)^{[d]}	Rutgers (Sr.)
1	7	Vinnie Johnson	G	United States	Seattle SuperSonics (from New Jersey via New York)^{[e]}	Baylor (Sr.)
1	8	Calvin Natt^{+}	F	United States	New Jersey Nets (from Indiana via Milwaukee)^{[f]}	Northeast Louisiana (Sr.)
1	9	Larry Demic	F/C	United States	New York Knicks (from Golden State via Boston)^{[b]}	Arizona (Sr.)
1	10	Roy Hamilton	G	United States	Detroit Pistons (from Milwaukee via San Diego)^{[g]}	UCLA (Sr.)
1	11	Cliff Robinson	F	United States	New Jersey Nets (from San Diego)^{[h]}	USC (So.)
1	12	Jim Paxson*	G/F	United States	Portland Trail Blazers	Dayton (Sr.)
1	13	Dudley Bradley	G/F	United States	Indiana Pacers (from Atlanta)^{[i]}	North Carolina (Sr.)
1	14	Brad Holland	G	United States	Los Angeles Lakers	UCLA (Sr.)
1	15	Phil Hubbard	F/C	United States	Detroit Pistons (from Denver)^{[j]}	Michigan (Sr.)
1	16	Jim Spanarkel	G/F	United States	Philadelphia 76ers	Duke (Sr.)
1	17	Lee Johnson	F	United States	Houston Rockets	East Texas State (Sr.)
1	18	Reggie King	F	United States	Kansas City Kings	Alabama (Sr.)
1	19	Wiley Peck	G	United States	San Antonio Spurs	Mississippi State (Sr.)
1	20	Larry Knight^{#}	F	United States	Utah Jazz (from Phoenix)^{[k]}	Loyola (IL) (Sr.)
1	21	Sly Williams	G/F	United States	New York Knicks (from Seattle via Boston)^{[b]}	Rhode Island (Jr.)
1	22	Kyle Macy	G	United States	Phoenix Suns (from Washington)^{[l]}	Kentucky (Sr.)
2	23	Tico Brown^{#}	G	United States	Utah Jazz	Georgia Tech (Sr.)
2	24	Johnny High	G	United States	Phoenix Suns (from Boston)^{[m]}	Nevada (Sr.)
2	25	Oliver Mack	G	United States	Los Angeles Lakers (from Detroit via Denver)	East Carolina (Sr.)
2	26	Bruce Flowers	F	United States	Cleveland Cavaliers	Notre Dame (Sr.)
2	27	Reggie Carter	G	United States	New York Knicks	St. John's (Sr.)
2	28	Danny Salisbury^{#}	F	United States	Golden State Warriors (from Chicago)	Pan American (Sr.)
2	29	Tony Price	G	United States	Detroit Pistons (from New Jersey)	Pennsylvania (Sr.)
2	30	Gary Garland	G	United States	Denver Nuggets (from Golden State via San Diego)	DePaul (Sr.)
2	31	Edgar Jones	F/C	United States	Milwaukee Bucks	Nevada (Sr.)
2	32	Tony Zeno	F	United States	Indiana Pacers	Arizona State (Sr.)
2	33	Lawrence Butler^{#}	G	United States	Chicago Bulls (from San Diego via Denver)	Idaho State (Sr.)
2	34	Kim Goetz^{#}	F	United States	New York Knicks (from Portland)	San Diego State (Sr.)
2	35	James Bradley^{#}	F	United States	Atlanta Hawks	Memphis State (Sr.)
2	36	Clint Richardson	G	United States	Philadelphia 76ers (from Denver via New Jersey)	Seattle (Sr.)
2	37	Bernard Toone	F	United States	Philadelphia 76ers	Marquette (Sr.)
2	38	Larry Wilson^{#}	F	United States	Atlanta Hawks (from Houston)	Nicholls State (Sr.)
2	39	Victor King^{#}	F	United States	Los Angeles Lakers	Louisiana Tech (Sr.)
2	40	Andrew Fields^{#}	F	United States	Portland Trail Blazers (from San Antonio via Seattle)	Cheyney State (Sr.)
2	41	Mark Young^{#}	F	United States	Los Angeles Lakers (from Kansas City via Denver)	Fairfield (Sr.)
2	42	Paul Mokeski	F/C	United States	Houston Rockets (from Phoenix via Seattle)	Kansas (Sr.)
2	43	Johnny Moore	G	United States	Seattle SuperSonics	Texas (Sr.)
2	44	Joe DeSantis^{#}	G	United States	Washington Bullets	Fairfield (Sr.)
3	45	Arvid Kramer	C	United States	Utah Jazz	Augustana (SD) (Sr.)
3	46	Andrew Parker^{#}	G	United States	Washington Bullets	Iowa State (Sr.)
3	47	Calvin Garrett	F	United States	Chicago Bulls (from Cleveland)	Oral Roberts (Sr.)
3	48	Terry Duerod	G	United States	Detroit Pistons	Detroit (Sr.)
3	49	Cedrick Hordges	F/C	United States	Chicago Bulls	South Carolina (Sr.)
3	50	Geoff Huston	G	United States	New York Knicks	Texas Tech (Sr.)
3	51	John Gerdy^{#}	G	United States	New Jersey Nets	Davidson (Sr.)
3	52	Larry Gibson^{#}	C	United States	Milwaukee Bucks	Maryland (Sr.)
3	53	Wayne Kreklow	G	United States	Boston Celtics (from Indiana)	Drake (Sr.)
3	54	Lynbert Johnson	G/F	United States	Golden State Warriors	Wichita State (Sr.)
3	55	Tom Channel^{#}	G	United States	San Diego Clippers	Boston University (Sr.)
3	56	Mickey Fox^{#}	G	United States	Portland Trail Blazers	Saint Mary's University (Canada) (Sr.)
3	57	Donnie Marsh^{#}	G	United States	Atlanta Hawks	Franklin & Marshall (Sr.)
3	58	Earl Cureton	F/C	United States	Philadelphia 76ers	Detroit (Sr.)
3	59	Ricardo Brown^{#}	G	United States (Note: Brown later became a Filipino citizen and played for the Philippines national team.)	Houston Rockets	Pepperdine (Sr.)
3	60	Walter Daniels^{#}	G	United States	Los Angeles Lakers	Georgia (Sr.)
3	61	Ernesto Malcolm^{#}	G	Panama	Boston Celtics	Briar Cliff (Sr.)
3	62	Terry Crosby	G	United States	Kansas City Kings	Tennessee (Sr.)
3	63	Sylvester Norris	C	United States	San Antonio Spurs	Jackson State (Sr.)
3	64	Al Green^{#}	G	United States (Note: Green later became an Australian citizen.)	Phoenix Suns	LSU (Sr.)
3	65	Bill Laimbeer^{+}	C	United States	Cleveland Cavaliers (from Seattle)	Notre Dame (Sr.)
3	66	Charles Floyd^{#}	F	United States	Washington Bullets	High Point (Sr.)
4	67	Greg Deane	G	United States	Utah Jazz	Utah (Sr.)
4	68	Nikos Galis^{^#}	G	United States (Note: Galis became a naturalized Greek citizen and played for the Greece national team.)	Boston Celtics	Seton Hall (Sr.)
4	69	Eugene Robinson^{#}	C	United States	Milwaukee Bucks	Louisiana–Monroe (Sr.)
4	70	Rick Swing^{#}	G	United States	Cleveland Cavaliers	The Citadel (Sr.)
4	71	Larry Rogers^{#}	F	United States	New York Knicks	U.S. Armed Forces (AAU)
4	72	George Maynor^{#}	G	United States	Chicago Bulls	East Carolina (Sr.)
4	73	James Donaldson^{+}	C	United States (Note: Donaldson was born in the United Kingdom.)	Seattle SuperSonics (from New Jersey)	Washington State (Sr.)
4	74	Don Newman^{#}	G	United States	Indiana Pacers	Idaho (Jr.)
4	75	Ron Ripley^{#}	F	United States	Golden State Warriors	Green Bay (Sr.)
4	76	Sammy Drummer^{#}	G	United States	Houston Rockets	Georgia Tech (Sr.)
4	77	Lionel Garrett^{#}	F	United States	San Diego Clippers	Southern (Sr.)
4	78	Darryl Robinson^{#}	G	United States	Portland Trail Blazers	Appalachian State (Sr.)
4	79	Ray White^{#}	G	United States	Los Angeles Lakers	Mississippi State (Sr.)
4	80	Lionel Green^{#}	F	United States	Houston Rockets	LSU (Sr.)
4	81	Ricky Reed^{#}	G	United States	Los Angeles Lakers	Temple (Sr.)
4	82	Jerry Sichting	G	United States	Golden State Warriors (from Denver)	Purdue (Sr.)
4	83	Mike Niles	F	United States	Philadelphia 76ers	Cal State Fullerton (Sr.)
4	84	Al Daniel^{#}	G	United States	San Antonio Spurs	Furman (Sr.)
4	85	John McCullough	G	United States	Kansas City Kings	Oklahoma (Sr.)
4	86	Malcolm Cesare^{#}	F	United States	Phoenix Suns	Florida (Sr.)
4	87	Richie Allen^{#}	F	United States	Seattle SuperSonics	Cal State Dominguez Hills (Sr.)
4	88	Lamont Reid^{#}	G	United States	Washington Bullets	Oral Roberts (Sr.)
5	89	Wolfe Perry^{#}	G	United States	Utah Jazz	Stanford (Sr.)
5	90	Jimmy Allen^{#}	G	United States	Boston Celtics	New Haven (Sr.)
5	91	Matt Simpkins^{#}	F	United States	Cleveland Cavaliers	Georgia Southern (Sr.)
5	92	Flintie Ray Williams^{#}	G	United States	Detroit Pistons	UNLV (Sr.)
5	93	Larry Washington^{#}	G	United States	Chicago Bulls	Drury (Sr.)
5	94	Johnny Green^{#}	F	United States	New York Knicks	UC Riverside (Sr.)
5	95	Jim Abromaitis^{#}	F	United States	New Jersey Nets	UConn (Sr.)
5	96	George Lett^{#}	F	United States	Golden State Warriors	Centenary (Sr.)
5	97	Jim Tillman ^{#}	G	United States	Milwaukee Bucks	Eastern Kentucky (Jr.)
5	98	Billy Reid	G	United States	Indiana Pacers	San Francisco (Jr.)
5	99	Greg Joyner^{#}	F	United States	San Diego Clippers	Middle Tennessee (Sr.)
5	100	Matthew White^{#}	C	United States	Portland Trail Blazers	Penn (Sr.)
5	101	Kendal Pinder^{#}	F	Bahamas (Note: Pinder possessed Australian citizenship from 1986 until it was revoked in 2007.)	Atlanta Hawks	NC State (Sr.)
5	102	Larry Williams^{#}	F	United States	Denver Nuggets	Louisville (Sr.)
5	103	Carl McPipe^{#}	F	United States	Philadelphia 76ers	Nebraska (Sr.)
5	104	Allen Leavell	G	United States	Houston Rockets	Oklahoma City (Sr.)
5	105	Curtis Watkins^{#}	F	United States	Kansas City Kings	DePaul (Sr.)
5	106	Steve Schall^{#}	F	United States	San Antonio Spurs	Arkansas (Jr.)
5	107	Mark Eaton^{+}	C	United States	Phoenix Suns	Cypress JC (Fr.) (Note: Even though Mark Eaton was a freshman, he was eligible to be drafted because he was already four years out of high school and therefore he did not need to apply for early entry.)
5	108	Marshall Ashford^{#}	G	United States	Washington Bullets	Virginia Tech (Sr.)
6	109	Ernie Cobb^{#}	G	United States	Utah Jazz	Boston College (Sr.)
6	110	Marvin Delph^{#}	G	United States	Boston Celtics	Athletes in Action
6	111	Truman Claytor^{#}	G	United States	Detroit Pistons	Kentucky (Sr.)
6	112	Jon Manning^{#}	G	United States	Cleveland Cavaliers	North Texas (Sr.)
6	113	Phil Abney^{#}	G	United States	New York Knicks	New Mexico (Sr.)
6	114	Steve Smith^{#}	G	United States	Chicago Bulls	USC (Sr.)
6	115	Tony Smith^{#}	G	United States	New Jersey Nets	UNLV (Sr.)
6	116	Derrick Mayes^{#}	G	United States	Milwaukee Bucks	Illinois State (Sr.)
6	117	Greg Guye^{#}	F	United States	Indiana Pacers	Stetson (Sr.)
6	118	Jim Mitchem^{#}	C	United States	Golden State Warriors	DePaul (Sr.)
6	119	Bob Bender^{#}	G	United States	San Diego Clippers	Duke (Sr.)
6	120	Ray Ellis^{#}	C	United States	Portland Trail Blazers	Pepperdine (Sr.)
6	121	Dwight Williams^{#}	G	United States	Atlanta Hawks	Gardner–Webb (Sr.)
6	122	Odell Ball^{#}	F	United States	Denver Nuggets	Marquette (Sr.)
6	123	Dan Hartshorne^{#}	C	United States	Philadelphia 76ers	Oregon (Sr.)
6	124	Collie Davis^{#}	F	United States	Houston Rockets	Southern (Sr.)
6	125	Terry Knight^{#}	G	United States	San Antonio Spurs	Pittsburgh (Sr.)
6	126	Bob Roma^{#}	F	United States	Kansas City Kings	Princeton (Sr.)
6	127	Dale Shackleford^{#}	F	United States	Phoenix Suns	Syracuse (Sr.)
6	128	Garcia Hopkins^{#}	F	United States	Washington Bullets	Morgan State (So.)
7	129	Paul Poe^{#}	F	United States	Utah Jazz	Louisiana College (Sr.)
7	130	Steve Castellan^{#}	F	United States	Boston Celtics	Virginia (Sr.)
7	131	Steve Skaggs^{#}	G	United States	Cleveland Cavaliers	Ohio (Sr.)
7	132	Ken Jones^{#}	G	United States	Detroit Pistons	Saint Mary's (Sr.)
7	133	Mike Eversley^{#}	F	United States	Chicago Bulls	Chicago State (Sr.)
7	134	Marc Coleman^{#}	G	United States	New York Knicks	Seton Hall (Sr.)
7	135	Jim Strickland^{#}	C	United States	New Jersey Nets	South Carolina (Jr.)
7	136	Dirk Ewing^{#}	G	United States	Indiana Pacers	Stetson (Sr.)
7	137	Ren Watson^{#}	F	United States	Golden State Warriors	VCU (Sr.)
7	138	Stan Ray^{#}	C	United States	Milwaukee Bucks	Cal State Fullerton (Sr.)
7	139	Jene Grey^{#}	F	United States	San Diego Clippers	Le Moyne (Sr.)
7	140	Jeff Tropf^{#}	F	United States	Portland Trail Blazers	Central Michigan (Sr.)
7	141	Tim Waterman^{#}	F	United States	Atlanta Hawks	St. Bonaventure (Sr.)
7	142	Bobby Willis^{#}	G	United States	Philadelphia 76ers	Penn (Sr.)
7	143	Rich Valavicius^{#}	F	United States	Houston Rockets	Auburn (Jr.)
7	144	John Johnson^{#}	G	United States	Denver Nuggets	Creighton (Sr.)
7	145	Nick Daniels^{#}	F	United States	Kansas City Kings	Xavier (Sr.)
7	146	Tyrone Branyan^{#}	F	United States	San Antonio Spurs	Texas (Sr.)
7	147	Ollie Matson Jr.^{#}	F	United States	Phoenix Suns	Pepperdine (Sr.)
7	Washington Bullets (forfeited due to selection of ineligible player) (Note: The Washington Bullets selected Conrad Whisenton who was a graduate student at the University of Alabama and had last played basketball at Fisk University in 1978. Whisenton had graduated from high school in 1974 which would have made him automatically eligible four years later for the 1978 NBA draft where he was not selected. The NBA originally upheld the Bullets' selection of Whisenton but it was deemed ineligible several weeks later.)					
8	148	Keith McDonald^{#}	G	United States	Utah Jazz	Utah State (Sr.)
8	149	Glenn Sudhop^{#}	C	United States	Boston Celtics	NC State (Sr.)
8	150	Rodney Lee^{#}	F	United States	Detroit Pistons	Memphis (Sr.)
8	151	Mark Haymore^{#}	F	United States	Cleveland Cavaliers	UMass (Sr.)
8	152	Billy Tucker^{#}	G	United States	New York Knicks	Tennessee State (Sr.)
8	153	Tony Warren^{#}	G	United States	Chicago Bulls	NC State (Sr.)
8	154	Henry Hollingsworth^{#}	G	United States	New Jersey Nets	Hofstra (Sr.)
8	155	Mario Butler^{#}	F	Panama	Golden State Warriors	Briar Cliff (Sr.)
8	156	Larry Spicer^{#}	F	United States	Milwaukee Bucks	UAB (Jr.)
8	157	Brian Magid^{#}	G	United States	Indiana Pacers	George Washington (Sr.)
8	158	Renaldo Lawrence^{#}	G	United States	San Diego Clippers	Appalachian State (Sr.)
8	159	Willie Pounds^{#}	F	United States	Portland Trail Blazers	Chaminade (Sr.)
8	160	John Goedeke^{#}	F	United States	Atlanta Hawks	UMBC (Sr.)
8	161	Delbert Watson^{#}	G	United States	Houston Rockets	East Tennessee State (Sr.)
8	162	Matt Teahan^{#}	F	United States	Denver Nuggets	Denver (Sr.)
8	163	Rick Raivio^{#}	G	United States	Philadelphia 76ers	Portland (Jr.)
8	San Antonio Spurs (forfeited due to selection of ineligible player) (Note: The San Antonio Spurs attempted to select Ed "Too Tall" Jones who was a professional boxer and former football player at the time of drafting. The NBA disallowed the pick because Jones had been out of college for more than five years.)					
8	164	Tony Vann^{#}	F	United States	Kansas City Kings	Alabama–Huntsville (Sr.)
8	165	Charles Jones	F/C	United States	Phoenix Suns	Albany State (Sr.)
8	166	Jo Jo Walters^{#}	G	United States	Washington Bullets	Manhattan (Sr.)
9	167	Milt Huggins^{#}	G	United States	Utah Jazz	Southern Illinois (Sr.)
9	168	Kevin Sinnett^{#}	F	United States	Boston Celtics	Navy (Sr.)
9	169	Tim Joyce^{#}	F	United States	Cleveland Cavaliers	Ohio (Sr.)
9	170	Val Bracey^{#}	G	United States	Detroit Pistons	Central Michigan (Sr.)
9	171	James Jackson^{#}	G	United States	Chicago Bulls	Minnesota (Sr.)
9	172	Brett Wyatt^{#}	G	United States	New York Knicks	New Jersey City (Sr.)
9	173	Ricky Free^{#}	G	United States	New Jersey Nets	Columbia (Sr.)
9	174	Roger Lapham^{#}	F	United States	Milwaukee Bucks	Maine (Sr.)
9	175	Gene Ransom^{#}	G	United States	Golden State Warriors	California (Sr.)
9	176	Mike Dodd^{#}	G	United States	San Diego Clippers	San Diego State (Sr.)
9	177	Stan Eckwood^{#}	G	United States	Portland Trail Blazers	Harding (Sr.)
9	178	Cedric Oliver^{#}	G	United States	Atlanta Hawks	Hamilton (Sr.)
9	179	Emmett Lewis^{#}	G	United States	Denver Nuggets	Colorado (Sr.)
9	180	Coby Leavitt^{#}	F	United States	Philadelphia 76ers	Utah (Jr.)
9	181	Gary Wilson^{#}	F	United States	Kansas City Kings	Southern Illinois (Sr.)
9	182	Eddie McLeod^{#}	F	United States	San Antonio Spurs	UNLV (Sr.)
9	183	Hosea Champine^{#}	G	United States	Phoenix Suns	Robert Morris (Sr.)
9	184	Gary Hooker^{#}	F	United States	Washington Bullets	Murray State (Jr.)
10	185	Paul Dawkins	F	United States	Utah Jazz	Northern Illinois (Sr.)
10	186	Alton Byrd^{#}	G	United States (Note: Byrd gained British citizenship in 1984 and played for the England national team.)	Boston Celtics	Columbia (Sr.)
10	187	Willie Polk^{#}	G	United States	Detroit Pistons	Grand Canyon (Sr.)
10	188	Terry Peavy^{#}	G	United States	Cleveland Cavaliers	Point Park (Sr.)
10	189	Gordon Thomas^{#}	G	United States	New York Knicks	St. John's (Sr.)
10	190	Marvin Thomas^{#}	G	United States	Chicago Bulls	UCLA (Sr.)
10	191	Eric Fleisher^{#}	G	United States	New Jersey Nets	Tulane (Sr.)
10	192	Kevin Heenan^{#}	G	United States	Golden State Warriors	Cal State Fullerton (Sr.)
10	193	Chris Fahrbach^{#}	F	United States	Milwaukee Bucks	North Dakota (Sr.)
10	194	Greg Hunter^{#}	F	United States	San Diego Clippers	Loyola Marymount (Sr.)
10	195	Kelvin Small^{#}	F	United States	Portland Trail Blazers	Oregon (Sr.)
10	196	Chad Nelson^{#}	C	United States	Atlanta Hawks	Drake (Sr.)
10	197	Cortez Collins^{#}	F	United States	Chicago Bulls	Southern Indiana (Sr.)
10	198	Keith McCord	G	United States	Philadelphia 76ers	UAB (Jr.)
10	199	Glenn Fine^{#}	G	United States	San Antonio Spurs	Harvard (Sr.)
10	200	Russell Saunders^{#}	G	United States	Kansas City Kings	New Mexico (Sr.)
10	201	Korky Nelson^{#}	F	United States	Phoenix Suns	Santa Clara (Sr.)
10	202	Steve Martin^{#}	G	United States	Washington Bullets	Georgetown (Sr.)

== Notable undrafted players ==
These players were not selected in the 1979 draft but played at least one game in the NBA.

Player	Pos.	Nationality	School/club team
Norman Black	G/F	United States	Saint Joseph's (Sr.)
Alan Hardy	G	United States	Michigan (Sr.)
Bill Mayfield	F	United States	Iowa (Sr.)

== Trades ==
- ^{a} On August 5, 1976, the Los Angeles Lakers acquired 1977, 1978 and 1979 first-round picks, and a 1980 second-round pick from the New Orleans Jazz in exchange for a 1978 first-round pick and a 1977 second-round pick. This trade was arranged as compensation when the Jazz signed Gail Goodrich on July 19, 1976. The Lakers used the pick to draft Magic Johnson.
- ^{b 1} ^{2} ^{3} On February 12, 1979, the New York Knicks acquired three first-round picks from the Boston Celtics in exchange for Bob McAdoo. Previously, the Celtics acquired a first-round pick on January 30, 1979, from the Golden State Warriors in exchange for Jo Jo White. The Celtics also acquired a first-round pick on January 17, 1979, from the Seattle SuperSonics in exchange for Dennis Awtrey. The Knicks used the picks to draft Bill Cartwright, Larry Demic and Sly Williams.
- ^{c 1} ^{2} On the draft-day, the Detroit Pistons acquired the fifth pick from the Milwaukee Bucks in exchange for the sixth pick and cash considerations. Previously, the Bucks acquired the pick from the Cleveland Cavaliers on June 1, 1978, in exchange for a 1978 first-round pick. The Pistons used the pick to draft Greg Kelser. The Bucks used the pick to draft Sidney Moncrief
- ^{d} On October 24, 1975, the Seattle SuperSonics acquired Gene Short and a first-round pick from the New York Knicks in exchange for Spencer Haywood. The Sonics used the pick to draft James Bailey.
- ^{e} On October 4, 1978, the Seattle SuperSonics acquired Lonnie Shelton and a 1979 first-round pick from the New York Knicks in exchange for a 1981 first-round pick. This trade was arranged as compensation when the Knicks signed Marvin Webster on September 29, 1978. Previously, the Knicks acquired the 1978 and 1979 first-round picks on June 8, 1978, from the New Jersey Nets in exchange for Phil Jackson, a 1978 first-round pick and US$3.2-million settlement of their indemnification debt to the Knicks. The Sonics used the pick to draft Vinnie Johnson.
- ^{f} On May 31, 1979, the New Jersey Nets acquired John Gianelli and the eighth pick from the Milwaukee Bucks in exchange for Harvey Catchings. Previously, the Bucks acquired the pick on June 8, 1978, from the Indiana Pacers as compensation for the signing of Alex English as a free agent. The Nets used the pick to draft Calvin Natt.
- ^{g} On November 23, 1977, the Detroit Pistons acquired Gus Gerard, John Shumate and 1979 first-round pick from the San Diego Clippers in exchange for Marvin Barnes, a 1978 second-round pick and a 1978 fourth-round pick. Previously, the Clippers acquired the pick on September 2, 1977, from the Milwaukee Bucks in exchange for John Gianelli. The Pistons used the pick to draft Roy Hamilton.
- ^{h} On September 1, 1977, the New Jersey Nets acquired George E. Johnson, 1978 and 1979 first-round picks from the San Diego Clippers in exchange for Nate Archibald. The Nets used the pick to draft Cliff Robinson.
- ^{i} On June 9, 1978, the Indiana Pacers acquired a first-round pick from the Atlanta Hawks as compensation for the signing of Dan Roundfield as a free agent. The Pacers used the pick to draft Dudley Bradley.
- ^{j} On February 1, 1978, the Detroit Pistons acquired Jim Price and a first-round pick from the Denver Nuggets in exchange for Ralph Simpson. The Pistons used the pick to draft Phil Hubbard.
- ^{k} On January 12, 1979, the Utah Jazz acquired Marty Byrnes, Ron Lee, 1979 and 1980 first-round picks from the Phoenix Suns in exchange for Truck Robinson. The Jazz used the pick to draft Larry Knight.
- ^{l} On June 22, 1979, the Phoenix Suns acquired the 22nd pick and a 1980 third-round pick from the Washington Bullets in exchange for Steve Malovic. The Suns used the pick to draft Kyle Macy.
- ^{m} On October 11, 1978, the Phoenix Suns acquired a second-round pick from the Boston Celtics in exchange for Dennis Awtrey. The Suns used the pick to draft Johnny High.

== Early entrants ==
=== College underclassmen ===
For the second year in a row, no underclassmen decided to opt out of the NBA draft, with only four total players deciding to declare entry into this year's draft. The following college basketball players successfully applied for early draft entrance.

- (United States) Garcia Hopkins – F, Morgan State (sophomore)
- (United States) Magic Johnson – G, Michigan State (sophomore)
- (United States) Cliff Robinson – F, USC (sophomore)
- (United States) Sly Williams – F/G, Rhode Island (junior)

== Invited attendees ==
The 1979 NBA draft is considered to be the second ever NBA draft to have utilized what's properly considered the "green room" experience for NBA prospects. The NBA's green room is a staging area where anticipated draftees often sit with their families and representatives, waiting for their names to be called on draft night. Often being positioned either in front of or to the side of the podium (in this case, being positioned in the Plaza Hotel's Grand Ballroom), once a player heard his name, he would walk to the podium to shake hands and take promotional photos with the NBA commissioner, Larry O'Brien. From there, the players often conducted interviews with various media outlets while backstage. However, during the late 1970s specifically, these select players were often called to the hotel to take promotional pictures with the NBA commissioner a day or two after the draft concluded. The NBA compiled its list of green room invites through collective voting by the NBA's team presidents and general managers alike, which in this year's case belonged to only what they believed were the top six prospects at the time. As such, the following players were invited to attend this year's draft festivities live and in person.

- (United States) Bill Cartwright – C, San Francisco
- (United States) David Greenwood – PF/C, UCLA
- (United States) Magic Johnson – PG, Michigan State
- (United States) Greg Kelser – SF, Michigan State
- (United States) Sidney Moncrief – SG, Arkansas
- (United States) Calvin Natt – SF, Northeast Louisiana

== See also ==
- List of first overall NBA draft picks
