= Tommie Green =

American basketball player (1956–2015)

Tommy Green
Personal information
- Born: April 8, 1956 Baton Rouge, Louisiana, U.S.
- Died: September 25, 2015 (aged 59)
- Listed height: 6 ft 3 in (1.91 m)
- Listed weight: 185 lb (84 kg)

Career information
- High school: McKinley (Baton Rouge, Louisiana)
- College: Southern (1974–1978)
- NBA draft: 1978: 2nd round, 35th overall pick
- Drafted by: New Orleans Jazz
- Position: Point guard
- Number: 14
- Coaching career: 1987–2001

Career history

Playing
- 1978–1979: New Orleans Jazz

Coaching
- 1987–1996: Southern (assistant)
- 1996–2001: Southern
- Stats at NBA.com
- Stats at Basketball Reference

Tommy L. Green (April 8, 1956 – September 25, 2015) was an American professional basketball point guard who spent one season in the National Basketball Association (NBA) as a member of the New Orleans Jazz during the 1978–79 season. He was drafted by the Jazz from Southern University and A&M College during the second round (35^{th} pick overall) in the 1978 NBA draft. In 1987, Green returned to Southern University first as an assistant coach then as the head coach from 1996 to 2001.

Green died on September 25, 2015, at the age of 59.

== Career statistics ==
Legend
GP	Games played	GS	Games started	MPG	Minutes per game
FG%	Field goal percentage	3P%	3-point field goal percentage	FT%	Free throw percentage
RPG	Rebounds per game	APG	Assists per game	SPG	Steals per game
BPG	Blocks per game	PPG	Points per game	**Bold**	Career high

=== NBA ===
==== Regular season ====
Year	Team	GP	MPG	FG%	FT%	RPG	APG	SPG	BPG	PPG
1978–79	New Orleans	59	13.7	.388	.762	1.2	2.4	1.0	.1	3.9
