= Rickey Williams =

American basketball player (born 1957)

Personal information
- Born: March 12, 1957 (age 69) Buffalo, New York, U.S.
- Listed height: 6 ft 1 in (1.85 m)
- Listed weight: 175 lb (79 kg)

Career information
- High school: Bishop Timon (Buffalo, New York)
- College: New Mexico (1974–1976); Long Beach State (1977–1979)
- NBA draft: 1978: 10th round, 190th overall pick
- Drafted by: New Orleans Jazz
- Playing career: 1982–1985
- Position: Point guard
- Number: 25

Career history
- 1981–1982: Alberta Dusters
- 1982–1983: Utah Jazz
- 1983–1984: Detroit Spirits
- 1984–1985: Bay State Bombardiers
- Stats at NBA.com
- Stats at Basketball Reference

Richard C. Williams (born March 12, 1957) is an American former basketball player. Born in Buffalo, New York, he was a 6'1" 175 lb (79 kg) point guard and attended Long Beach State and the University of New Mexico.

Williams played for the National Basketball Association's Utah Jazz during the 1982–83 season, averaging 3.3 points, 0.9 rebounds and 0.8 assists per game. He was originally selected by the Jazz (then based in New Orleans as the New Orleans Jazz) with the 4th pick in the tenth round of the 1978 NBA draft.

In 2009 as The Buffalo News celebrated 50 years of All-Western New York (WNY) basketball selections, Williams, who was a 1973–74 All-WNY first team selection, was a fourth team selection for the All-time All-WNY team.

== Career statistics ==
Legend
GP	Games played	GS	Games started	MPG	Minutes per game
FG%	Field goal percentage	3P%	3-point field goal percentage	FT%	Free throw percentage
RPG	Rebounds per game	APG	Assists per game	SPG	Steals per game
BPG	Blocks per game	PPG	Points per game	**Bold**	Career high

=== NBA ===
==== Regular season ====
Year	Team	GP	GS	MPG	FG%	3P%	FT%	RPG	APG	SPG	BPG	PPG
1982–83	Utah	44	0	7.9	.415	.000	.660	.9	.8	.5	.1	3.3
