= Greg Deane =

American basketball player

Personal information
- Born: December 6, 1957 (age 68) Tulare, California
- Listed height: 6 ft 4 in (1.93 m)
- Listed weight: 190 lb (86 kg)

Career information
- High school: Union (Tulare, California)
- College: Utah (1975–1979)
- NBA draft: 1979: 4th round, 67th overall pick
- Drafted by: Utah Jazz
- Position: Shooting guard
- Number: 33

Career history
- 1979: Utah Jazz
- Stats at NBA.com
- Stats at Basketball Reference

Greg Steven Deane (born December 6, 1957, in Tulare, California) is an American former professional basketball shooting guard who spent one season in the National Basketball Association (NBA) as a member of the Utah Jazz during the 1979–80 season. He attended the University of Utah where he played on the school's basketball team. The Jazz drafted Deane during the fourth round of the 1979 NBA draft. His son Daniel Deane played basketball at the University of Utah and Oregon State University and his daughter Lauren Deane played basketball at Weber State University and professionally overseas in Canada.

== Career statistics ==
Legend
GP	Games played	GS	Games started	MPG	Minutes per game
FG%	Field goal percentage	3P%	3-point field goal percentage	FT%	Free throw percentage
RPG	Rebounds per game	APG	Assists per game	SPG	Steals per game
BPG	Blocks per game	PPG	Points per game	**Bold**	Career high

=== NBA ===
==== Regular season ====
Year	Team	GP	MPG	FG%	3P%	FT%	RPG	APG	SPG	BPG	PPG
1979–80	Utah	7	6.9	.182	1.000	.714	.9	.9	.0	.0	1.4
