= 1978 NBA draft =

Basketball player selection

General information
- Sport: Basketball
- Date: June 9, 1978
- Location: Plaza Hotel (New York City, New York)

Overview
- 202 total selections in 10 rounds
- League: NBA
- First selection: Mychal Thompson (Portland Trail Blazers)
- Hall of Famers: 3: F Larry Bird; G Maurice Cheeks; G Michael Cooper

The 1978 NBA draft was the 32nd annual draft of the National Basketball Association (NBA). The draft was held on June 9, 1978, at the Plaza Hotel in New York City, New York, before the 1978–79 season. In this draft, 22 NBA teams took turns selecting amateur U.S. college basketball players and other eligible players, including international players. The first two picks in the draft belonged to the teams that finished last in each conference, with the order determined by a coin flip. The Indiana Pacers won the coin flip and were awarded the first overall pick, while the Kansas City Kings, who obtained the New Jersey Nets' first-round pick in a trade, were awarded the second pick. The Pacers then traded the first pick to the Portland Trail Blazers before the draft. The remaining first-round picks and the subsequent rounds were assigned to teams in reverse order of their win–loss record in the previous season.

A player who had finished his four-year college eligibility was eligible for selection. If a player left college early, he would not be eligible for selection until his college class graduated. Before the draft, five college underclassmen were declared eligible for selection under the "hardship" rule. These players had applied and gave evidence of financial hardship to the league, which granted them the right to start earning their living by starting their professional careers earlier. Prior to the start of the season, the Buffalo Braves relocated to San Diego and became the San Diego Clippers. The draft consisted of 10 rounds comprising the selection of 202 players.

== Draft selections and draftee career notes ==
Mychal Thompson from the University of Minnesota was selected first overall by the Portland Trail Blazers. Thompson, who was born in the Bahamas, became the first foreign-born player to be drafted first overall. Phil Ford from the University of North Carolina was selected second by the Kansas City Kings. He went on to win the Rookie of the Year Award and was also selected to the All-NBA Second Team in his rookie season. A college underclassman from Indiana State University, Larry Bird, was selected sixth by the Boston Celtics. However, he opted to return to Indiana State for his senior season before entering the league in 1979. He won the Rookie of the Year Award and was also selected to both the All-NBA First Team and the All Star Game in his rookie season. Bird spent his entire 13-year career with the Celtics and won three NBA championships. He also won three consecutive Most Valuable Player Awards and two Finals Most Valuable Player Awards. He was also selected to ten All-NBA Teams and thirteen consecutive All-Star Games. For his achievements, he has been inducted to the Basketball Hall of Fame. Bird was also named to the list of the 50 Greatest Players in NBA History announced at the league's 50th anniversary in 1996. After retiring as a player, Bird went on to have a coaching career. He coached the Indiana Pacers for three seasons, leading them to an NBA Finals appearance. He also won the Coach of the Year Award in 1998.

Before the draft, Larry Bird had just finished his junior year at Indiana State. However, he was eligible to be drafted without applying for "hardship" because his original college class at Indiana University had graduated. He initially enrolled at Indiana University in 1974 but dropped out before the season began. After sitting out a year, he enrolled at Indiana State. Despite being eligible for the draft, he stated that he would return to college for his senior season. His hometown team, the Indiana Pacers, initially held the first overall pick. However, when they failed to persuade him to leave college early, they traded the first pick to the Blazers, who also failed to convince him into signing. Five teams, including the Pacers who held the third pick, passed on Bird until the Celtics used the sixth pick to draft him. They drafted him even though they knew that they might lose the exclusive rights to him if he didn't sign before the next draft. He could reenter the draft in 1979 and sign with the other team that drafted him, and in negotiations with Red Auerbach Bird's agent Bob Woolf bluntly dismissed Red's lowball salary offers (he said that he would not offer Bird a contract that paid him more than the $400,000 annual salary of the team's highest-paid player at the time, Dave Cowens) and made it clear that Bird would enter the 1979 Draft without any regrets if Boston didn't change its plans. Nevertheless, in April 1979, he signed a five-year, US$3.25-million contract with the Celtics, which made him the highest-paid rookie in the history of team sport at that time.

Maurice Cheeks, the 36th pick, was selected to four All-Star Games and five consecutive All-Defensive Teams. After retiring as a player, he coached the Portland Trail Blazers and the Philadelphia 76ers for four and a half seasons each. He then coached the Detroit Pistons for the first portion of the 2013/14 NBA season but was fired before finishing his first season with the team. Micheal Ray Richardson, the fourth pick, Larry Bird, the sixth pick, Reggie Theus, the ninth pick, and Mike Mitchell, the fifteenth pick, are the only other players from this draft who were selected to an All-Star Game. Michael Cooper, the 60th pick, won the Defensive Player of the Year Award in 1987 and was selected to eight consecutive All-Defensive Teams. He spent his entire 12-year career with the Los Angeles Lakers and won five NBA championships. After retiring, he coached the Los Angeles Sparks of the Women's National Basketball Association (WNBA) for eight seasons, leading them to two consecutive WNBA championships in 2001 and 2002. He also served as an interim head coach of the Denver Nuggets in the 2004–2005 season. Four other players drafted also went on to have coaching careers in the NBA: Reggie Theus, 21st pick Mike Evans, 53rd pick Randy Ayers and 55th pick Marc Iavaroni.

== Key ==
Pos.	G	F	C
Position	Guard	Forward	Center

^	Denotes player who has been inducted to the Naismith Memorial Basketball Hall of Fame
^{+}	Denotes player who has been selected for at least one All-Star Game
^{x}	Denotes player who has been selected for at least one All-NBA Team
^{#}	Denotes player who has never appeared in an NBA regular-season or playoff game
^{~}	Denotes player who has been selected as Rookie of the Year

== Draft ==
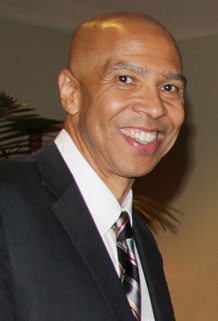
Mychal Thompson was selected 1st overall by the Portland Trail Blazers.

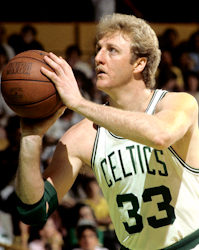
Larry Bird was selected 6th overall by the Boston Celtics.

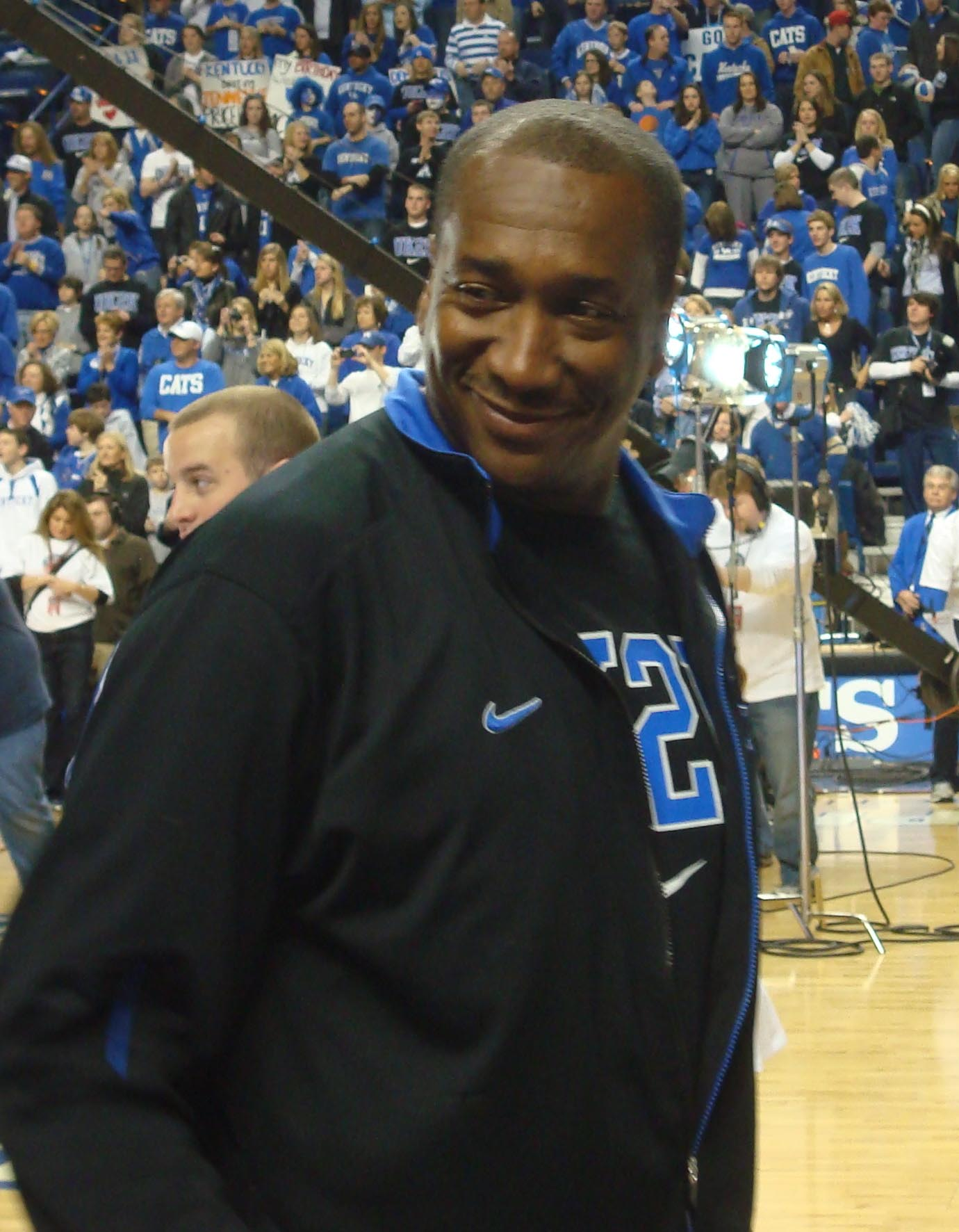
Jack Givens was selected 16th overall by the Atlanta Hawks.

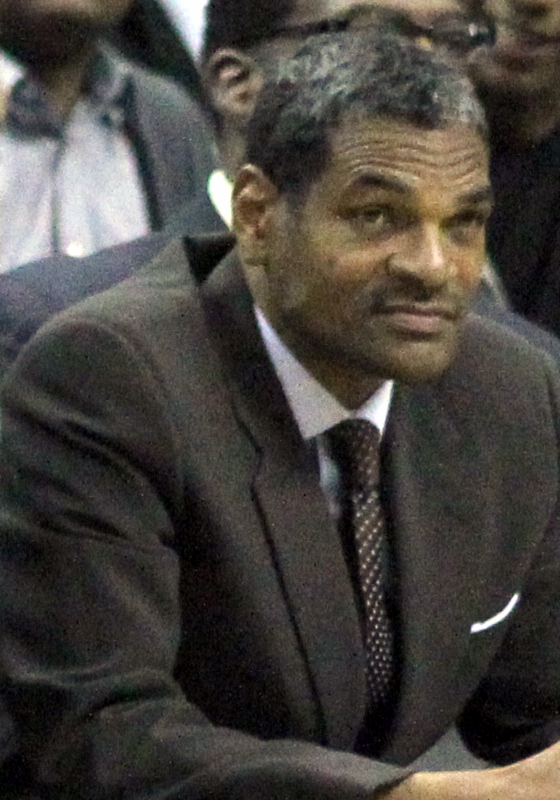
Maurice Cheeks was selected 36th overall by the Philadelphia 76ers.

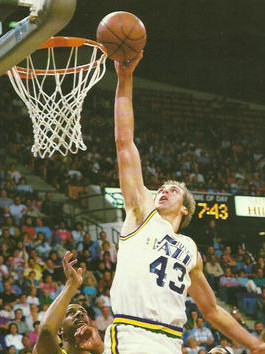
Marc Iavaroni was selected 55th overall by the New York Knicks.

Round	Pick	Player	Pos.	Nationality	Team	School/club team
1	1	Mychal Thompson	F/C	Bahamas	Portland Trail Blazers (from Indiana)^{[a]}	Minnesota (Sr.)
1	2	Phil Ford^{x~}	G	United States	Kansas City Kings (from New Jersey)^{[b]}	North Carolina (Sr.)
1	3	Rick Robey	F/C	United States	Indiana Pacers (from Buffalo via Portland)^{[a]}	Kentucky (Sr.)
1	4	Micheal Ray Richardson^{+}	G/F	United States	New York Knicks (from Houston via Buffalo and New Jersey)^{[c]}	Montana (Sr.)
1	5	Purvis Short	G/F	United States	Golden State Warriors (from Kansas City via Los Angeles)^{[d]}	Jackson State (Sr.)
1	6	Larry Bird^^{~}	F	United States	Boston Celtics	Indiana State (Jr.)
1	7	Ron Brewer	G	United States	Portland Trail Blazers (from Detroit via Seattle)^{[e]}	Arkansas (Sr.)
1	8	Freeman Williams	G/F	United States	Boston Celtics (from New Orleans via Los Angeles)^{[f]}	Portland State (Sr.)
1	9	Reggie Theus^{+}	G	United States	Chicago Bulls	UNLV (Jr.)
1	10	Butch Lee	G	Puerto Rico	Atlanta Hawks	Marquette (Sr.)
1	11	James Hardy	F/C	United States	New Orleans Jazz (from Golden State)^{[g]}	San Francisco (Jr.)
1	12	George Johnson	F/C	United States	Milwaukee Bucks (from Cleveland)^{[h]}	St. John's (Sr.)
1	13	Winford Boynes	G/F	United States	New Jersey Nets (from New York)^{[c]}	San Francisco (Jr.)
1	14	Roger Phegley	G/F	United States	Washington Bullets	Bradley (Sr.)
1	15	Mike Mitchell^{+}	F	United States	Cleveland Cavaliers (from Milwaukee)^{[i]}	Auburn (Sr.)
1	16	Jack Givens	G/F	United States	Atlanta Hawks (from Los Angeles via New Orleans)^{[f]}	Kentucky (Sr.)
1	17	Rod Griffin^{#}	F	United States	Denver Nuggets (from Seattle)^{[j]}	Wake Forest (Sr.)
1	18	Dave Corzine	C	United States	Washington Bullets (from Denver)^{[k]}	DePaul (Sr.)
1	19	Marty Byrnes	F	United States	Phoenix Suns	Syracuse (Sr.)
1	20	Frankie Sanders	G/F	United States	San Antonio Spurs	Southern (Jr.)
1	21	Mike Evans	G	United States	Denver Nuggets (from Philadelphia)^{[l]}	Kansas State (Sr.)
1	22	Raymond Townsend	G	United States	Golden State Warriors (from Portland)^{[m]}	UCLA (Sr.)
2	23	Terry Tyler	G/F	United States	Detroit Pistons (from New Jersey)	Detroit (Sr.)
2	24	Keith Herron	G/F	United States	Portland Trail Blazers (from Buffalo via Atlanta)	Villanova (Sr.)
2	25	Rick Wilson	G	United States	Atlanta Hawks (from Houston)	Louisville (Sr.)
2	26	Ron Carter	G	United States	Los Angeles Lakers (from Kansas City)^{[d]}	VMI (Sr.)
2	27	Wayne Radford	G	United States	Indiana Pacers	Indiana (Sr.)
2	28	Buster Matheney^{#}	F	United States	Houston Rockets (from Boston)	Utah (Sr.)
2	29	John Long	G/F	United States	Detroit Pistons	Detroit (Sr.)
2	30	Jeff Judkins	G/F	United States	Boston Celtics (from New Orleans)	Utah (Sr.)
2	31	Marvin Johnson^{#}	F	United States	Chicago Bulls	New Mexico (Sr.)
2	32	John Rudd	F	United States	New York Knicks (from Atlanta)	McNeese State (Sr.)
2	33	Harry Davis	F	United States	Cleveland Cavaliers	Florida State (Sr.)
2	34	Greg Bunch	F	United States	New York Knicks	Cal State Fullerton (Sr.)
2	35	Tommie Green	G	United States	New Orleans Jazz (from Golden State)	Southern (Sr.)
2	36	Maurice Cheeks^	G	United States	Philadelphia 76ers (from Milwaukee)	West Texas State (Sr.)
2	37	Terry Sykes^{#}	F	United States	Washington Bullets	Grambling State (Sr.)
2	38	Lew Massey^{#}	G	United States	Los Angeles Lakers	UNC Charlotte (Sr.)
2	39	James Lee^{#}	F	United States	Seattle SuperSonics	Kentucky (Sr.)
2	40	Wayne Cooper	F/C	United States	Golden State Warriors (from Denver)	New Orleans (Sr.)
2	41	Jerome Whitehead	F/C	United States	Buffalo Braves (from Phoenix)	Marquette (Sr.)
2	42	Keven McDonald^{#}	F	United States	Seattle SuperSonics (from San Antonio)	Pennsylvania (Sr.)
2	43	Glenn Hagan	G	United States	Philadelphia 76ers	St. Bonaventure (Sr.)
2	44	Clemon Johnson	F/C	United States	Portland Trail Blazers	Florida A&M (Sr.)
3	45	Mike Phillips^{#}	F	United States	New Jersey Nets	Kentucky (Sr.)
3	46	Hollis Copeland	F	United States	Denver Nuggets (from Buffalo)	Rutgers (Sr.)
3	47	Billy Ray Bates	G	United States	Houston Rockets	Kentucky State (Sr.)
3	48	Mike Santos^{#}	F	United States	San Diego Clippers	Utah State (Sr.)
3	49	Jeff Cook	F/C	United States	Kansas City Kings	Idaho State (Sr.)
3	50	Dana Skinner^{#}	G	United States	Boston Celtics	Merrimack (Sr.)
3	51	Ricky Gallon^{#}	C	United States	San Diego Clippers	Louisville (Sr.)
3	52	Mike Russell^{#}	F	United States	Kansas City Kings	Texas Tech (Sr.)
3	53	Randy Ayers^{#}	G	United States	Chicago Bulls	Miami (Ohio) (Sr.)
3	54	Steve Grant^{#}	F	United States	Atlanta Hawks	Manhattan (Sr.)
3	55	Marc Iavaroni	F	United States	New York Knicks	Virginia (Sr.)
3	56	Steve Neff^{#}	C	United States	Golden State Warriors	Southern Nazarene (Sr.)
3	57	Kenny Higgs	G	United States	Cleveland Cavaliers	LSU(Sr.)
3	58	Rick Apke^{#}	F	United States	Washington Bullets	Creighton (Sr.)
3	59	Pat Cummings	F/C	United States	Milwaukee Bucks	Cincinnati (Sr.)
3	60	Michael Cooper^{^}	G/F	United States	Los Angeles Lakers	New Mexico (Sr.)
3	61	Dave Baxter^{#}	G	United States	Seattle SuperSonics	Michigan (Sr.)
3	62	Dave Batton	C	United States	New Jersey Nets (from Denver)	Notre Dame (Sr.)
3	63	Joel Kramer	F/C	United States	Phoenix Suns	San Diego State (Sr.)
3	64	Gerald Henderson	G	United States	San Antonio Spurs	VCU (Sr.)
3	65	Marvin Delph^{#}	G	United States	San Diego Clippers	Arkansas (Sr.)
3	66	Sterling Edmonds^{#}	F	United States	Portland Trail Blazers	Dartmouth (Sr.)
4	67	Jackie Robinson	F	United States	Houston Rockets (from New Jersey)	UNLV (Sr.)
4	68	Jim Boylan^{#}	G	United States	San Diego Clippers	Marquette (Sr.)
4	69	Joel Thompson^{#}	F	United States	Houston Rockets	Michigan (Sr.)
4	70	Geoff Crompton	C	United States	Kansas City Kings	North Carolina (Sr.)
4	71	Rickey Lee^{#}	F	United States	Indiana Pacers	Oregon State (Sr.)
4	72	Dave Nelson^{#}	F	United States; Greece	Boston Celtics	Bloomfield (Sr.)
4	73	Larry Harris^{#}	F	United States	San Diego Clippers	Pittsburgh (Sr.)
4	74	Mel Davis^{#}	F	United States	New Orleans Jazz	North Texas (Sr.)
4	75	Jeff Covington^{#}	F	United States	New Orleans Jazz	Youngstown State (Sr.)
4	76	Leroy McDonald^{#}	G	United States	San Diego Clippers	Wake Forest (Sr.)
4	77	Derrick Jackson^{#}	G	United States	Golden State Warriors	Georgetown (Sr.)
4	78	Stan Rome^{#}	G	United States	Cleveland Cavaliers	Clemson (Sr.)
4	79	Erving Giddings^{#}	F	United States	New York Knicks	Dayton (Sr.)
4	80	Otis Howard	F	United States	Milwaukee Bucks	Austin Peay (Sr.)
4	81	Lawrence Boston	F	United States	Washington Bullets	Maryland (Sr.)
4	82	Harold Robertson^{#}	G	United States	Los Angeles Lakers	Lincoln (Missouri) (Sr.)
4	83	Billy Lewis^{#}	F	United States	Seattle SuperSonics	Illinois State (Sr.)
4	84	Walter Jordan	F	United States	New Jersey Nets (from Denver)	Purdue (Sr.)
4	85	Bob Miller	F	United States	Phoenix Suns	Cincinnati (Sr.)
4	86	Rich Adams^{#}	F	United States	San Antonio Spurs	Illinois (Sr.)
4	87	Brett Vroman	C	United States	Philadelphia 76ers	UNLV (Sr.)
4	88	Wayne Smith^{#}	G	United States	Phoenix Suns	UC Irvine (Sr.)
5	89	Cecil Rose^{#}	G	Bahamas	New Jersey Nets	Houston (Sr.)
5	90	David Thompson^{#}	F	United States	San Diego Clippers	Florida State (Sr.)
5	91	Gary Goodner^{#}	F	United States	Houston Rockets	Texas (Sr.)
5	92	James Sparrow^{#}	F	United States	Indiana Pacers	North Carolina A&T (Sr.)
5	93	Derrick Clairborne^{#}	G	United States	Kansas City Kings	UMass (Sr.)
5	94	Greg Tynes^{#}	G	United States	Boston Celtics	Seton Hall (Sr.)
5	95	Dave Caligaris^{#}	G	United States	Detroit Pistons	Northeastern (Sr.)
5	96	Duck Williams	G	United States	New Orleans Jazz	Notre Dame (Sr.)
5	97	Ron Anthony^{#}	F	United States	Chicago Bulls	Jacksonville (Sr.)
5	98	Chris Potter^{#}	F	United States	Atlanta Hawks	Holy Cross (Sr.)
5	99	Ken Koenigs^{#}	F	United States	Cleveland Cavaliers	Kansas (Sr.)
5	100	Greg Green^{#}	G	United States	New York Knicks	Southern (Sr.)
5	101	Bubba Wilson	G	United States	Golden State Warriors	Western Carolina (Sr.)
5	102	Roger Dickens^{#}	G	United States	Washington Bullets	Towson (Sr.)
5	103	Russ Coleman^{#}	F	United States	Milwaukee Bucks	Pacific (Sr.)
5	104	Carlos Terry	G/F	United States	Los Angeles Lakers	Winston-Salem State (Sr.)
5	105	Ralph Drollinger	C	United States	Seattle SuperSonics	Athletes in Action
5	106	Michael Edwards^{#}	F	United States	Denver Nuggets	Pan American (Sr.)
5	107	Andre Wakefield	G	United States	Phoenix Suns	Loyola (Illinois) (Sr.)
5	108	Eugene Parker^{#}	G	United States	San Antonio Spurs	Purdue (Sr.)
5	109	Mark Haymore^{#}	F	United States	Philadelphia 76ers	UMass (Jr.)
5	110	Clay Johnson	G	United States	Portland Trail Blazers	Missouri (Sr.)
6	111	Golie Augustus^{#}	F	United States	New Jersey Nets	South Carolina (Sr.)
6	112	Bob Misevicius^{#}	F	United States	San Diego Clippers	Providence (Sr.)
6	113	Eddie Joe Chavez^{#}	G	United States	Houston Rockets	Santa Clara (Sr.)
6	114	Jim Krivacs^{#}	G	United States	Kansas City Kings	Texas (Sr.)
6	115	Sherman Dillard^{#}	G	United States	Indiana Pacers	James Madison (Sr.)
6	116	Dave Winey^{#}	F	United States	Boston Celtics	Minnesota (Sr.)
6	117	Audie Matthews^{#}	G	United States	Detroit Pistons	Illinois (Sr.)
6	118	John Douglas	G	United States	New Orleans Jazz	Kansas (Sr.)
6	119	John Shoemaker^{#}	G	United States	Chicago Bulls	Miami (Ohio) (Sr.)
6	120	Gerald Glover^{#}	F	United States	Atlanta Hawks	Howard (Sr.)
6	121	Eddie Warren^{#}	G	Panama	New York Knicks	Briar Cliff (Sr.)
6	122	Buzz Harnett^{#}	F	United States	Golden State Warriors	San Diego (Sr.)
6	123	Ron Bell^{#}	G	United States	Cleveland Cavaliers	Virginia Tech (Sr.)
6	124	Dave Kyle^{#}	F	United States	Milwaukee Bucks	Cleveland State (Sr.)
6	125	Archie Aldridge^{#}	F	United States	Washington Bullets	Miami (Ohio) (Sr.)
6	126	Kim Stewart^{#}	F	United States	Los Angeles Lakers	Washington (Sr.)
6	127	Robert Heard^{#}	F	United States	Denver Nuggets	Columbus State (Sr.)
6	128	Charles Thompson^{#}	F	Bahamas	Phoenix Suns	Houston (Sr.)
6	129	Harry Morgan^{#}	F	United States	San Antonio Spurs	Indiana State (Sr.)
6	130	Osborne Lockhart^{#}	G	Bahamas	Philadelphia 76ers	Minnesota (Sr.)
6	131	Tim Evans^{#}	F	United States	Portland Trail Blazers	Puget Sound (Sr.)
7	132	Doug Jemison^{#}	F	United States	New Jersey Nets	San Francisco (Sr.)
7	133	Stan Pietkiewicz	G/F	United States	Buffalo Braves	Auburn (Sr.)
7	134	Stan Stewart^{#}	G	United States	Houston Rockets	Loyola Marymount (Sr.)
7	135	Ollie Matson Jr.^{#}	F	United States	Indiana Pacers	Pepperdine (Jr.)
7	136	Charles McMillian^{#}	G	United States	Kansas City Kings	North Texas (Sr.)
7	137	Steve Balkun^{#}	F	United States	Boston Celtics	Fairfield (Sr.)
7	138	Herb Entzminger^{#}	F	United States	Detroit Pistons	Johnson C. Smith (Sr.)
7	139	Willie Howard^{#}	F	United States	New Orleans Jazz	New Mexico (Sr.)
7	140	Jarvis Reynolds^{#}	F	United States	Chicago Bulls	West Georgia (Sr.)
7	141	Jim DeWeese^{#}	F	United States	Atlanta Hawks	Gonzaga (Sr.)
7	142	Rick Bernard^{#}	G	United States	Golden State Warriors	Saint Mary's (Sr.)
7	143	Tony Smith^{#}	G	United States	Cleveland Cavaliers	UNLV (Jr.)
7	144	Gary Pember^{#}	F	United States	New York Knicks	Nasson (Sr.)
7	145	Ed Hopkins^{#}	F	United States	Washington Bullets	Georgetown (Sr.)
7	146	Kim Anderson	F	United States	Milwaukee Bucks	Libertas Forli (Italy)
7	147	Larry Paige^{#}	F	United States	Los Angeles Lakers	Colorado State (Sr.)
7	148	Jack Gilloon^{#}	G	United States	Denver Nuggets	South Carolina (Sr.)
7	149	Steve Malovic	C	United States	Phoenix Suns	San Diego State (Jr.)
7	150	Hector Olivencia^{#}	G	United States	San Antonio Spurs	Sacred Heart (Sr.)
7	151	Anthony Murray^{#}	G	United States	Philadelphia 76ers	Alabama (Sr.)
7	152	Walter Reason^{#}	G	United States	Portland Trail Blazers	Pacific (Sr.)
8	153	Bruce Campbell^{#}	F	United States	New Jersey Nets	Providence (Sr.)
8	154	Felton Young^{#}	C	United States	San Diego Clippers	Jacksonville (Sr.)
8	155	Ron Hammye^{#}	F	United States	Kansas City Kings	Bowling Green (Sr.)
8	156	Kim Fisher^{#}	G	United States	Boston Celtics	Fairfield (Sr.)
8	157	Earl Evans	F	United States	Detroit Pistons	UNLV (Jr.)
8	158	Carl Kilpatrick	C	United States	New Orleans Jazz	Northeast Louisiana (Sr.)
8	159	Chubby Cox	G	United States	Chicago Bulls	San Francisco (Sr.)
8	160	Ed Murphy^{#}	F	United States	Atlanta Hawks	Merrimack (Sr.)
8	161	Roland Martin^{#}	F	United States	Cleveland Cavaliers	Missouri Southern (Sr.)
8	162	Greg Sanders^{#}	F	United States	New York Knicks	St. Bonaventure (Sr.)
8	163	Tony Searcy^{#}	F	United States	Golden State Warriors	Appalachian State (Sr.)
8	164	Tom Zaliagiris^{#}	G	United States	Milwaukee Bucks	North Carolina (Sr.)
8	165	Nestor Cora^{#}	F	Puerto Rico	Washington Bullets	St. Francis Brooklyn (Sr.)
8	166	Larry Vaculik^{#}	F	United States	Denver Nuggets	Colorado (Sr.)
8	167	George Fowler^{#}	C	United States	Phoenix Suns	Pacific (Sr.)
8	168	Henry Taylor^{#}	F	United States	San Antonio Spurs	UT Rio Grande Valley (Sr.)
8	169	Alan Cunningham^{#}	F	United States	Philadelphia 76ers	Colorado State (Sr.)
8	170	Mark Wickman^{#}	F	United States	Portland Trail Blazers	Linfield (Sr.)
9	171	Frank Sowinski^{#}	F	United States	New Jersey Nets	Princeton (Sr.)
9	172	Bobby White^{#}	F	United States	San Diego Clippers	Centenary (Sr.)
9	173	Les Anderson^{#}	F	United States	Boston Celtics	George Washington (Sr.)
9	174	Ulice Payne^{#}	F	United States	Detroit Pistons	Marquette (Sr.)
9	175	Chad Nelson^{#}	C	United States	New Orleans Jazz	Drake (Jr.)
9	176	Joe Ponsetto^{#}	F	United States	Chicago Bulls	DePaul (Sr.)
9	177	Maurice Robinson^{#}	C	United States	Atlanta Hawks	West Virginia (Sr.)
9	178	Denny Fields^{#}	F	United States	New York Knicks	UNC Wilmington (Sr.)
9	179	Bobby Humbles^{#}	G	United States	Golden State Warriors	Bradley (Sr.)
9	180	Steve Bayless^{#}	F	United States	Cleveland Cavaliers	Central State (Sr.)
9	181	Tim Claxton^{#}	G	United States	Washington Bullets	Temple (Sr.)
9	182	Gary Rosenberger^{#}	G	United States	Milwaukee Bucks	Marquette (Sr.)
9	183	Thomas Schneeberger^{#}	F	United States	Denver Nuggets	Air Force (Sr.)
9	184	Nate Stokes^{#}	G	United States	Phoenix Suns	Grand Canyon (Sr.)
9	185	Rick Taylor^{#}	G	United States	San Antonio Spurs	Arizona State (Sr.)
9	186	Paul Cozens^{#}	F	United States	Portland Trail Blazers	George Fox (Sr.)
10	187	Michael Vicens^{#}	G	Puerto Rico	New Jersey Nets	Holy Cross (Sr.)
10	188	Walter Harrigan^{#}	F	United States	Boston Celtics	Brandeis (Sr.)
10	189	Dave Grauzer^{#}	G	United States	Detroit Pistons	Central Michigan (Sr.)
10	190	Rickey Williams	G	United States	New Orleans Jazz	Long Beach State (Sr.)
10	191	Mark Tucker^{#}	G	United States	Chicago Bulls	Oklahoma State (Sr.)
10	192	Marshall Lester^{#}	F	United States	Atlanta Hawks	Florida Southern (Sr.)
10	193	Mike Muff^{#}	F	United States	Golden State Warriors	Murray State (Sr.)
10	194	Gary Winton^{#}	F	United States	Cleveland Cavaliers	Army (Sr.)
10	195	Ernest Simons^{#}	G	United States	New York Knicks	Pace (Sr.)
10	196	Tom Anderson^{#}	G	United States	Milwaukee Bucks	Green Bay (Sr.)
10	197	Steve Connor^{#}	G	United States	Washington Bullets	Boise State (Sr.)
10	198	Phil Taylor^{#}	F	United States	Denver Nuggets	Arizona (Sr.)
10	199	Lewis Cohen^{#}	G	United States	Phoenix Suns	Cal Poly (Sr.)
10	200	Larry Brewster^{#}	C	United States	San Antonio Spurs	Florida (Sr.)
10	201	Dennis James^{#}	F	United States	Philadelphia 76ers	Widener (Sr.)
10	202	Tim Warkentin^{#}	F	United States	Portland Trail Blazers	Biola (Sr.)

== Notable undrafted players ==
These players were not selected in the 1978 draft but played at least one game in the NBA.

Player	Pos.	Nationality	School/club team
Del Beshore	G	United States	California (Pennsylvania) (Sr.)
Mike Davis	C	United States	Maryland (Sr.)
Rock Lee	C	United States	San Diego State (Sr.)
Myles Patrick	F	United States	Auburn (Sr.)
Sam Pellom	C	United States	Buffalo (Sr.)
Jim Zoet	C	Canada	Lakehead (Sr.)

== Trades ==
- ^{a 1} ^{2} On June 8, 1978, the Portland Trail Blazers acquired the first pick from the Indiana Pacers in exchange for Johnny Davis and the third overall pick. Previously, the Blazers acquired a first-round pick on October 18, 1976, from the Buffalo Braves in exchange for Moses Malone. The Blazers used the pick to draft Mychal Thompson. The Pacers used the pick to draft Rick Robey.
- ^{b} On September 10, 1976, the Kansas City Kings acquired Jim Eakins, Brian Taylor, 1977 and 1978 first-round picks from the New Jersey Nets in exchange for Nate Archibald. The Kings used the pick to draft Phil Ford.
- ^{c 1} ^{2} On June 8, 1978, the New York Knicks acquired the fourth pick and a 1979 first-round pick from the New Jersey Nets in exchange for Phil Jackson, the thirteenth pick and US$3.2-million settlement of their indemnification debt to the Knicks. Previously, the Nets acquired George E. Johnson, the pick and a 1979 first-round pick on September 1, 1977, from the Buffalo Braves in exchange for Nate Archibald. Previously, the Braves acquired the pick and a 1977 first-round pick on October 24, 1976, from the Houston Rockets in exchange for Moses Malone. The Knicks used the pick to draft Micheal Ray Richardson. The Nets used the pick to draft Winford Boynes.
- ^{d 1} ^{2} On September 14, 1977, the Golden State Warriors acquired a first-round pick and cash considerations from the Los Angeles Lakers. This trade was arranged as compensation when the Lakers signed Jamaal Wilkes on July 11, 1977. Previously, the Lakers acquired Ollie Johnson, the pick and a second-round pick on June 1, 1977, from the Kansas City Kings in exchange for Lucius Allen. The Warriors used the pick to draft Purvis Short. The Lakers used the pick to draft Ron Carter.
- ^{e} On November 11, 1977, the Portland Trail Blazers acquired a 1978 first-round pick and a 1979 second-round pick from the Seattle SuperSonics in exchange for Wally Walker. Previously, the Sonics acquired the pick on September 25, 1975, from the Detroit Pistons in exchange for Archie Clark. The Blazers used the pick to draft Ron Brewer.
- ^{f 1} ^{2} On December 27, 1977, the Boston Celtics acquired Don Chaney, Kermit Washington and a first-round pick from the Los Angeles Lakers in exchange for Charlie Scott. On October 13, 1977, the Atlanta Hawks acquired a first-round pick from the New Orleans Jazz in exchange for Joe Meriweather. Previously, the Lakers acquired 1977, 1978 and 1979 first-round picks, and a 1980 second-round pick on August 5, 1976, from the Jazz in exchange for a 1978 first-round pick and a 1977 second-round pick. This trade was arranged as compensation when the Jazz signed Gail Goodrich on July 19, 1976. The Celtics used the pick to draft Freeman Williams. The Hawks used the pick to draft Jack Givens.
- ^{g} On October 3, 1977, the New Orleans Jazz acquired a first-round pick from the Golden State Warriors as compensation for the signing of E. C. Coleman as a free agent. The Jazz used the pick to draft James Hardy.
- ^{h} On January 13, 1977, the Milwaukee Bucks acquired Rowland Garrett, 1977 and 1978 first-round picks from the Cleveland Cavaliers in exchange for Elmore Smith and Gary Brokaw. The Bucks used the pick to draft George Johnson.
- ^{i} On June 1, 1978, the Cleveland Cavaliers acquired the 15th pick from the Milwaukee Bucks in exchange for a 1979 first-round pick. The Cavaliers used the pick to draft Mike Mitchell.
- ^{j} On the draft-day, the Denver Nuggets acquired the 17th pick from the Seattle SuperSonics in exchange for Tom LaGarde. The Nuggets used the pick to draft Rod Griffin.
- ^{k} On October 11, 1977, the Washington Bullets acquired a first-round pick from the Denver Nuggets in exchange for Bo Ellis. The Bullets used the pick to draft Dave Corzine.
- ^{l} On the draft-day, the Denver Nuggets acquired the 21st pick from the Philadelphia 76ers in exchange for a 1984 first-round pick. The Nuggets used the pick to draft Mike Evans.
- ^{m} On June 7, 1978, the Golden State Warriors acquired the 22nd pick from the Portland Trail Blazers in exchange for a 1981 first-round pick. The Warriors used the pick to draft Raymond Townsend.

== Early entrants ==
=== College underclassmen ===
This year's draft only saw five total players that qualified as underclassmen entering the draft, with none of them opting to withdraw from this draft year. The following college basketball players successfully applied for early draft entrance.

- (United States) Winford Boynes – G, San Francisco (junior)
- (United States) James Hardy – F, San Francisco (junior)
- (United States) James Holley – G, Schenectady County CC (sophomore)
- (United States) Frankie Sanders – F, Southern (junior)
- (United States) Reggie Theus – G, UNLV (junior)

== Invited attendees ==
The 1978 NBA draft is considered to be the first official NBA draft to have utilized what's properly considered the "green room" experience for NBA prospects. The NBA's green room is a staging area where anticipated draftees often sit with their families and representatives, waiting for their names to be called on draft night. Often being positioned either in front of or to the side of the podium (in this case, being positioned in the Plaza Hotel's Grand Ballroom), once a player heard his name, he would walk to the podium to shake hands and take promotional photos with the NBA commissioner, Larry O'Brien. From there, the players often conducted interviews with various media outlets while backstage. However, during the late 1970s specifically, these select players were often called to the hotel to take promotional pictures with the NBA commissioner a day or two after the draft concluded. The NBA compiled its list of green room invites through collective voting by the NBA's team presidents and general managers alike, which in this year's case belonged to only what they believed were the top five prospects at the time. As such, the following five players were the first ever invited attendees for the NBA draft's history.

- (United States) George L. Johnson – PF/C, San Francisco
- (Puerto Rico) Butch Lee – PG, Marquette
- (United States) Rick Robey – PF/C, Kentucky
- (United States) Purvis Short – SG/SF, Jackson State
- (The Bahamas) Mychal Thompson – PF/C, Minnesota

== Notes ==
1: Even though Larry Bird was a junior, he was eligible to be drafted because he was already four years out of high school and therefore he did not need to apply for early entry.
2: Nelson became known as David Stergakos during his career in Greece.

== See also ==
- List of first overall NBA draft picks
