= Buster Matheney =

American basketball player

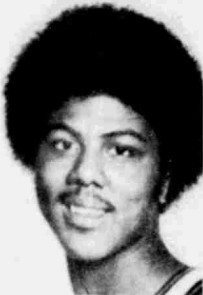
- Matheney, circa 1976

Personal information
- Born: August 2, 1956 Los Angeles, California, U.S.
- Died: September 25, 2000 (aged 44) Los Angeles, California, U.S.
- Listed height: 6 ft 8 in (2.03 m)
- Listed weight: 212 lb (96 kg)

Career information
- High school: Bell (Los Angeles, California)
- College: Utah (1974–1978)
- NBA draft: 1978: 2nd round, 28th overall pick
- Drafted by: Houston Rockets
- Position: Power forward

Career highlights
- First-team All-WAC (1978)
- Stats at Basketball Reference

Charles "Buster" Matheney (August 2, 1956 – September 25, 2000) was an American basketball player who played four years for the University of Utah, before being drafted by the Houston Rockets in the 1978 NBA draft. However, he did not play in the NBA. He later played internationally, including in Australia for the Newcastle Falcons of National Basketball League.

Matheney was shot and killed on a Los Angeles street in September 2000.
