= Duck Williams =

American basketball player (born 1956)

Personal information
- Born: August 2, 1956 (age 70) Demopolis, Alabama, U.S.
- Listed height: 6 ft 2 in (1.88 m)
- Listed weight: 180 lb (82 kg)

Career information
- High school: Mackin Catholic (Washington, D.C.)
- College: Notre Dame (1974–1978)
- NBA draft: 1978: 5th round, 96th overall pick
- Drafted by: New Orleans Jazz
- Playing career: 1978–1980
- Position: Point guard
- Number: 20

Career history
- 1979–1980: Utah Jazz

Career highlights
- Third-team Parade All-American (1974)

Career NBA statistics
- Points: 506 (6.6 ppg)
- Assists: 183 (2.4 apg)
- Steals: 100 (1.3 spg)
- Stats at NBA.com
- Stats at Basketball Reference

Donald Edgar "Duck" Williams (born August 2, 1956) is an American former professional basketball player. He played in the National Basketball Association for the Utah Jazz during the 1979–80 season.

== Career statistics ==
Legend
GP	Games played	GS	Games started	MPG	Minutes per game
FG%	Field goal percentage	3P%	3-point field goal percentage	FT%	Free throw percentage
RPG	Rebounds per game	APG	Assists per game	SPG	Steals per game
BPG	Blocks per game	PPG	Points per game	**Bold**	Career high

=== NBA ===
==== Regular season ====
Year	Team	GP	MPG	FG%	3P%	FT%	RPG	APG	SPG	BPG	PPG
1979–80	Utah	77	23.3	.447	.000	.700	1.4	2.4	1.3	.1	6.6
