= Carl Kilpatrick =

American basketball player

Personal information
- Born: May 16, 1956 (age 70) Bastrop, Louisiana, U.S.
- Listed height: 6 ft 10 in (2.08 m)
- Listed weight: 230 lb (104 kg)

Career information
- High school: Bastrop (Bastrop, Louisiana)
- College: Kilgore College (1974–1975); Louisiana–Monroe (1975–1978)
- NBA draft: 1978: 8th round, 158th overall pick
- Drafted by: New Orleans Jazz
- Position: Center
- Number: 51

Career history
- 1978–1979: Montana Sky
- 1979–1980: Utah Jazz
- 1980–1981: Tampereen Pyrintö
- Stats at NBA.com
- Stats at Basketball Reference

Carl Kilpatrick (born May 16, 1956) is an American former professional basketball player. A 6'10" center, he attended Northeast Louisiana University (now the University of Louisiana at Monroe) and was selected by the New Orleans Jazz with the sixth pick in the eighth round of the 1978 NBA draft. During the summer, he averaged 18.5 points and 14 rebounds in the New Orleans Summer Professional League. He was cut by the Jazz before the start of the season and later signed with Montana Sky of the Western Basketball Association. In September 1979, he signed with the Jazz. He spent the majority of the season on the injury list, appearing in two games at the end of the season.

In the 1980–1981 season, Kilpatrick played 22 games for Tampereen Pyrintö of Finland. The team went to the SM-sarja finals, where they lost to Torpan Pojat and gained silver medals.

Kilpatrick's son Austin played for the Idaho State University Bengals men's basketball team.

== Career statistics ==
Legend
| GP | Games played | GS | Games started | MPG | Minutes per game |
| FG% | Field goal percentage | 3P% | 3-point field goal percentage | FT% | Free throw percentage |
| RPG | Rebounds per game | APG | Assists per game | SPG | Steals per game |
| BPG | Blocks per game | PPG | Points per game | **Bold** | Career high |

=== NBA ===
==== Regular season ====
| Year | Team | GP | MPG | FG% | 3P% | FT% | RPG | APG | SPG | BPG | PPG |
|---|---|---|---|---|---|---|---|---|---|---|---|
| 1979–80 | Utah | 2 | 3.0 | .500 | – | .500 | 2.0 | .0 | .0 | .0 | 1.5 |
