= Wolfe Perry =

American actor and basketball player

- Born: January 22, 1957 (age 69); New Orleans, Louisiana
- Other names: L. Wolfe Perry, Jr.
- Occupations: Television actor, basketball player
- Basketball career

Personal information
- Listed height: 6 ft 2 in (1.88 m)

Career information
- High school: St. Elizabeth (Oakland, California); Oakland Technical (Oakland, California)
- College: Stanford (1975–1979)
- NBA draft: 1979: 5th round, 89th overall pick
- Drafted by: Utah Jazz
- Position: Guard
- Number: 21

Career highlights
- Second-team All-Pac-10 (1979)
- Stats at Basketball Reference

Lieutenant Wolfe Perry Jr. (born January 22, 1957) is an American actor and former basketball player. He played college basketball for Stanford University.

== Life and career ==
Perry was born in New Orleans, Louisiana. He attended St. Elizabeth High in Oakland, California, before transferring after two years to Oakland Technical High School, where he was a top student and basketball player.

== Basketball career ==
Perry was a standout basketball player at Stanford University and graduated in 1979 with a degree in drama. Perry, who stands 6'2", was a four-year letterman and starting guard for the Cardinal. In his first year, he was one of only four freshman in the Pacific-8 Conference to earn a starting role. He led the Cardinal in scoring average his senior season, 1978–79, with 18.3 points per game, and he was a second-team All-Pac-10 selection. He scored a career-high 34 points in an upset win that season against national powerhouse UCLA. For his college career, Perry scored 1,287 points (18th all time at Stanford) with 258 assists (12th) and 112 steals (9th).

Perry was a favorite of the basketball fans at Stanford, many of whom expected him to be drafted into the NBA. He was drafted in the fifth round of 1979 NBA draft by the Utah Jazz. However, he quit during training camp to pursue an acting career. Perry said that his "knees fell apart" and that his "heart wasn't in [basketball] anymore."

== Acting career ==
As an actor, Perry is primarily known for his role as Teddy Rutherford, one of Coach Ken Reeves' new players in the third season of the CBS TV series The White Shadow. He wore the uniform number 21 in his role, which is the same number he wore at Stanford.

In 1980, Perry was a cast member of the PBS series Up and Coming, which was the first weekly American TV drama centered on an African American family. Additionally, he appeared in the 1986 film Soul Man.

He also made an appearance in the 1980s detective show Riptide. In 1982, he appeared in an episode of Hill Street Blues.

== Later life ==
Perry coached boys basketball for two seasons (2006–2008) at John Swett High School in Crockett, California, before becoming the coach at St. Elizabeth High, his former high school, in 2008.
