= Up and Coming (TV series) =

American television drama series

- Genre: Drama
- Directed by: Ivan Cury
- Starring: Robert DoQui; Cindy Herron; L. Wolfe Perry, Jr. Yule Caise; Gamy L. Taylor
- Theme music composer: Benorce Blackman; Bill Withers
- Opening theme: "The Best You Can"
- Country of origin: United States
- Original language: English
- No. of seasons: 1
- No. of episodes: 15

Production
- Executive producers: Avon Kirkland; Art Washington
- Running time: 24 mins.

Original release
- Network: PBS
- Release: October 5, 1980 – January 1, 1981

Up and Coming is an American television drama series which aired on Public Broadcasting Service (PBS) during the 1980-1981 season.

== Synopsis ==
The series depicts the Wilsons, a successful African American family from Oakland, California who moves into an integrated, middle-class neighborhood in nearby San Francisco. Although it was short-lived, it was one of the first weekly American TV drama series centered on an African American family (preceded only by Harris and Company, a 1979 NBC drama starring Bernie Casey).

Among the cast members were former Stanford University basketball star L. Wolfe Perry, Jr. and a teenage Cindy Herron (who years later would become a founding member of the R&B female quartet En Vogue).

The theme song is a cover version of the Bill Withers tune "The Best You Can". The original version can be found on Withers' 1975 album Making Music.

== Cast ==
- Robert DoQui as Frank Wilson
- Cindy Herron as Valerie Wilson
- L. Wolfe Perry, Jr. as Kevin Wilson
- Yule Caise as Marcus Wilson
- Gammy Singer as Joyce Wilson

== Episodes ==
- "Movin' In, Movin' On" (Part 1)
- "Movin' In, Movin' On" (Part 2)
- "Get With It"
- "Incident at Hamilton High"
- "Return of the Kingpin"
- "Love's Lesson Learned"
- "Righteous Rumour"
- "Growing Pains"
- "Highrise Rebound" (Part 1)
- "Highrise Rebound" (Part 2)
- "Cheating Cats"
- "Game Plan"
- "Loss of Innocence"
- "A Little Romance" (Part 1)
- "A Little Romance" (Part 2)
