= 2014–15 KK Partizan season =

Serbian basketball league season

Partizan NIS Belgrade
2014–15 season
- President: Predrag Danilović
- Head coach: Duško Vujošević
- Basketball League of Serbia: Runner-up
- Radivoj Korać Cup: Semi-finals
- Adriatic League: Semi-finals
- Eurocup: Regular season
- Lowest home attendance: vs Konstantin 19.05.2015. (800)
Home	Away

In the 2014–15 season, Partizan NIS Belgrade competed in the Basketball League of Serbia, the Radivoj Korać Cup, the Adriatic League and the Eurocup.

== Players ==
=== Current roster ===
Note: Flags indicate national team eligibility at FIBA-sanctioned events. Players may hold other non-FIBA nationalities not displayed.

KK Partizan NIS roster
Players
Coaches

Pos.	No.	Nat.	Name	Ht.	Wt.	Age
G	5	(Serbia)	Aranitović, Petar	1.88 m (6 ft 2 in)	75 kg (165 lb)	31 – 20 September 1994
F	7	(Greece)	Kouzeloglou, Giannis	2.04 m (6 ft 8 in)	92 kg (203 lb)	31 – 1 April 1995
F	8	(Slovenia)	Murić, Edo	2.02 m (6 ft 8 in)	95 kg (209 lb)	34 – 27 November 1991
G	9	(Serbia)	Marinković, Vanja	1.95 m (6 ft 5 in)	82 kg (181 lb)	29 – 9 January 1997
G	10	(France)	Dallo, Boris	1.96 m (6 ft 5 in)	81 kg (179 lb)	32 – 12 March 1994
C	11	(Serbia)	Milutinov, Nikola	2.12 m (6 ft 11 in)	100 kg (220 lb)	31 – 30 December 1994
F/C	14	(Serbia)	Đumić, Božo	2.08 m (6 ft 10 in)	102 kg (225 lb)	34 – 7 January 1992
C	15	(Serbia)	Bojanić, Ivan	2.08 m (6 ft 10 in)	100 kg (220 lb)	29 – 30 April 1997
G/F	21	(Serbia)	Andrić, Mihajlo	2.00 m (6 ft 7 in)	85 kg (187 lb)	32 – 4 January 1994
G/F	22	(Serbia)	Milutinović, Andreja	1.98 m (6 ft 6 in)	95 kg (209 lb)	35 – 6 August 1990
F	24	(Serbia)	Glišić, Miloš	2.05 m (6 ft 9 in)	98 kg (216 lb)	28 – 21 April 1998
F	33	(Serbia)	Bezbradica, Nemanja	2.06 m (6 ft 9 in)	96 kg (212 lb)	33 – 29 March 1993

Head coach

- (Montenegro) Duško Vujošević

Assistant coach(es)

- (Serbia) Velimir Gašić
- (Serbia) Petar Božić
- (Serbia) Goran Tadić

Strength & conditioning coach(es)

- (Montenegro) Radoman Šćekić
- (Serbia) Zlatko Tešić

Physiotherapist(s)

- (Serbia) Predrag Šapina

Team manager

- (Serbia) Dragan Todorić

Legend

- (C) Team captain
- Injured

- Roster
Updated: 19 June 2015

=== Depth chart ===
Pos.	Starting 5	Bench 1	Bench 2	Reserve
C	Nikola Milutinov	Božo Đumić		Miloš Glišić
PF	Milan Mačvan	Nemanja Bezbradica		Giannis Kouzeloglou
SF	Edo Murić	Aleksandar Pavlović
SG	Dragan Milosavljević	Mihajlo Andrić	Andreja Milutinović
PG	Milenko Tepić	Vanja Marinković	Boris Dallo	Petar Aranitović

=== Roster changes ===
==== In ====
No.	Pos.	Nat.	Name	Age	Moving from	Source
22	G/F	(Serbia)	Andreja Milutinović	24	(Greece) Apollon Patras	
7	PF	(Greece)	Giannis Kouzeloglou	19	(Greece) Mandoulides Academy	
8	G/F	(Slovenia)	Edo Murić	22	(Slovenia) Krka Novo Mesto	
35	F	(Serbia)	Luka Bogdanović	29	(Turkey) Türk Telekom	
4	PF	(Serbia)	Milan Mačvan	24	(Turkey) Galatasaray	
8	G/F	(Serbia)	Aleksandar Pavlović	31	Free Agent	
14	C	(Serbia)	Božo Đumić	23	(Serbia) Vojvodina	
2	PG	(Nigeria)	Josh Akognon	29	(China) Foshan Dralions	

==== Out ====
No.	Pos.	Nat.	Name	Age	Moving to	Source
7	PF	(France)	Joffrey Lauvergne	22	(Russia) BC Khimki	
10	G	(Serbia)	Bogdan Bogdanović	21	(Turkey) Fenerbahçe	
9	PG	(France)	Léo Westermann	21	(Spain) FC Barcelona	
44	F	(Latvia)	Dāvis Bertāns	21	(Spain) Laboral Kutxa	
15	C	(Serbia)	Dejan Musli	23	Free Agent	
55	C	(Serbia)	Đoko Šalić	19	Free Agent	
35	F	(Serbia)	Luka Bogdanović	29	MoraBanc Andorra	
14	C	(Serbia)	Đorđe Gagić	24	(Turkey) Royal Halı Gaziantep	
2	PG	(Nigeria)	Josh Akognon	29	Free Agent	

== Competitions ==
	Competition	Position
(Serbia)	Basketball League of Serbia	2nd
(Serbia)	Radivoj Korać Cup	Semi-final
(European Union)	Eurocup	Regular Season
(Socialist Federal Republic of Yugoslavia)	Adriatic League	4th

=== Basketball League of Serbia ===
==== Standings ====
	Team	Pld	W	L	PF	PA	Diff	Points	%
1	Crvena Zvezda Telekom	14	13	1	1233	995	+238	27	.929
2	Partizan NIS	14	13	1	1169	975	+194	27	.929
3	Metalac Farmakom	14	8	6	1080	1013	+67	22	.571
4	Mega Leks	14	7	7	1207	1142	+65	21	.500

Pld – Played; W – Won; L – Lost; PF – Points for; PA – Points against; Diff – Difference; Pts – Points.

==== Results and positions by round ====
Round	1	2	3	4	5	6	7	8	9	10	11	12	13	14
Ground	A	H	A	H	A	H	A	H	A	H	A	H	A	H
Result	W	W	W	W	W	W	L	W	W	W	W	W	W	W
Position	3	3	2	2	2	2	2	2	2	2	2	2	2	2

Updated to match(es) played on 4 June 2015. Source: kls.rs
A = Away; H = Home; W = Win; D = Draw; L = Loss

==== Matches ====
Regular Season

28 March 2015
18:00

Stats

Konstantin	74–87	Partizan NIS
Scoring by quarter: 18–16, 18–22, 11–18, 27–31
Pts: Tasić 17; Rebs: Barać, Despotović 5 Asts: Stojačić 6		Pts: Milutinov 17; Rebs: Mačvan 13; Asts: Milutinov 4

Čair, Niš
Attendance: 3,000
Referees: Dragan Nešković, Saša Maričić, Ivan Stefanović.

4 April 2015
18:00

Stats

Partizan NIS	82–68	Mega Leks
Scoring by quarter: 26–20, 19–16, 22–12, 15–20
Pts: Mačvan 17; Rebs: Mačvan 9 Asts: Tepić 8		Pts: Miljenović 15; Rebs: Musli 8 Asts: Zagorac 5

Pionir, Belgrade
Attendance: n/a
Referees: Milivoje Jovičić, Marko Juras, Uroš Nikolić.

6 May 2015
18:00

Stats

FMP	56–61	Partizan NIS
Scoring by quarter: 13–20, 19–15, 13–17, 11–9
Pts: Čović 11; Rebs: Mićović 8 Asts: Čović 3		Pts: Milutinov 16; Rebs: Mačvan, Milutinov 8 Asts: Milosavljević 5

Železnik Hall, Belgrade
Attendance: 300
Referees: Milivoje Jovičić, Milija Vojinović, Aleksandar Glišić.

9 May 2015
21:00

Stats

Partizan NIS	82–61	Metalac Farmakom
Scoring by quarter: 23–17, 25–19, 16–19, 18–6
Pts: Murić 21; Rebs: Mačvan 12; Asts: Mačvan 5		Pts: Malešević 14; Rebs: Todorović 7 Asts: Malešević, Ljubičić 4

Pionir, Belgrade
Attendance: 2,000
Referees: Marko Juras, Milan Mažić, Vladimir Vesković.

11 May 2015
18:00

Stats

Vojvodina Srbijagas	61–79	Partizan NIS
Scoring by quarter: 14–27, 23–18, 10–16, 14–18
Pts: Popović 11; Rebs: Šešlija 7 Asts: Popović, Novak, Radonjić 2		Pts: Milosavljević 15; Rebs: Mačvan, Milutinov 6 Asts: Dallo, Mačvan, Milutinov 3

SPENS, Novi Sad
Attendance: 1,200
Referees: Ilija Belošević, Branislav Mrdak, Nemanja Ninković.

14 May 2015
19:30

Stats

Partizan NIS	97–70	Tamiš
Scoring by quarter: 19–19, 28–16, 25–23, 25–12
Pts: Andrić 15; Rebs: Đumić 7 Asts: Tepić 5		Pts: Kruščić 17; Rebs: Hukić, Manojlović, Milošević, Ivanović 3 Asts: Kruščić, Vujović, Djordjević 3

Pionir, Belgrade
Attendance: 1,300
Referees: Vladimir Jevtović, Vladimir Vesković, Duško Sedlar.

17 May 2015
21:00

Stats

Crvena zvezda Telekom	92–76	Partizan NIS
Scoring by quarter: 26–16, 21–23, 20–17, 25–20
Pts: Kalinić 22; Rebs: Mitrović 6 Asts: Kalinić, Jenkins 4		Pts: Mačvan 25; Rebs: Mačvan, Milutinov 6 Asts: Milosavljević, Milutinov, Dallo 3

Pionir, Belgrade
Attendance: 3,912
Referees: Milivoje Jovičić, Milija Vojinović, Aleksandar Glišić.

19 May 2015
19:30

Stats

Partizan NIS	89–80	Konstantin
Scoring by quarter: 25–14, 27–25, 22–25, 15–16
Pts: Milutinov 16; Rebs: Milutinov 8 Asts: Tepić 5		Pts: Đorđević 13; Rebs: Stojačić 6 Asts: Stojačić 5

Pionir, Belgrade
Attendance: 800
Referees: Branislav Mrdak, Radoš Arsenijević, Duško Sedlar.

23 May 2015
17:45

Stats

Mega Leks	95–96 (OT)	Partizan NIS
Scoring by quarter: 19–16, 23–18, 24–27, 19–24, Overtime: 10–11
Pts: Jokić 33; Rebs: Jokić 12; Asts: Miljenović 7		Pts: Pavlović 23; Rebs: Milutinov 20; Asts: Tepić 5

Sports Hall Pinki, Sremska Mitrovica
Attendance: 1,000
Referees: Milivoje Jovičić, Marko Juras, Uroš Nikolić.

25 May 2015
19:30

Stats

Partizan NIS	81–67	FMP
Scoring by quarter: 23–14, 19–24, 23–18, 16–11
Pts: Murić 17; Rebs: Milutinov 11; Asts: Murić 5		Pts: Čović 17; Rebs: Dobrić 6 Asts: Čović 10

Pionir, Belgrade
Attendance: 1,000
Referees: Saša Maričić, Nemanja Ninković, Ivan Stefanović.

27 May 2015
18:00

Stats

Metalac Farmakom	62–80	Partizan NIS
'Scoring by quarter: 10–24, 13–22, 23–17, 16–17
Pts: Ljubičić 10; Rebs: Jeremić 5 Asts: Otašević 3		Pts: Andrić 14; Rebs: Milutinov 14; Asts: Dallo 5

Valjevo Sports Hall, Valjevo
Attendance: 1,500
Referees: Milivoje Jovičić, Dragan Nešković, Uroš Nikolić.

30 May 2015
18:00

Stats

Partizan NIS	85–57	Vojvodina Srbijagas
Scoring by quarter: 21–5, 26–16, 18–22, 20–14
Pts: Marinković 21; Rebs: Milutinov 7 Asts: Dallo, Mačvan 4		Pts: Popović 10; Rebs: Šešlija 7 Asts: Novak 3

Pionir, Belgrade
Attendance: 1,500
Referees: Saša Maričić, Uroš Obrknežević, Vladimir Vesković.

2 June 2015
19:30

Stats

Tamiš	50–82	Partizan NIS
Scoring by quarter: 12–17, 13–24, 10–22, 15–19
Pts: Ivanović 12; Rebs: Ivanović, Milošević 3 Asts: Manojlović 2		Pts: Bezbradica 14; Rebs: Marinković, Dallo 8 Asts: Dallo 4

Valjevo Sports Hall, Valjevo
Attendance: 1,500
Referees: Branislav Mrdak, Radoš Arsenijević, Predrag Milovanović.

4 June 2015
21:00

Stats

Partizan NIS	92–82	Crvena zvezda Telekom
Scoring by quarter: 30–19, 23–22, 19–21, 20–20
Pts: Pavlović 20; Rebs: Murić, Mačvan 9 Asts: Mačvan, Tepić 6		Pts: Marjanović 20; Rebs: Marjanović 10; Asts: Jenkins 5

Pionir, Belgrade
Attendance: 3,000
Referees: Ilija Belošević, Milivoje Jovičić, Uroš Nikolić.

Semi-finals

7 June 2015
20:00

Stats

Partizan NIS	86–66	Metalac Farmakom
Scoring by quarter: 31–20, 15–8, 22–15, 18–23
Pts: Andrić 19; Rebs: Milutinov 10; Asts: Tepić 4		Pts: Malešević 19; Rebs: Malešević 8 Asts: Majstorović 4

Pionir, Belgrade
Attendance: 2,000
Referees: Milija Vojinović, Uroš Nikolić, Ivan Stefanović.

9 June 2015
18:00

Stats

Metalac Farmakom	69–73	Partizan NIS
Scoring by quarter: 16–19, 16–15, 14–19, 23–20
Pts: Majstorović 20; Rebs: Malešević 8 Asts: Ljubičić, Malešević, Majstorović 3		Pts: Milosavljević 17; Rebs: Milutinov 10; Asts: Milosavljević 6

Valjevo Sports Hall, Valjevo
Attendance: 500
Referees: Dragan Nešković, Saša Maričić, Marko Juras.

==== Statistics ====
Legend
GP	Games played	GS	Games started	MPG	Minutes per game
FG%	Field-goal percentage	3FG%	3-point field-goal percentage	FT%	Free-throw percentage
RPG	Rebounds per game	APG	Assists per game	SPG	Steals per game
BPG	Blocks per game	PPG	Points per game	PIR	PIR per game

#	Player	GP	GS	MPG	2FG%	3FG%	FT%	RPG	APG	SPG	BPG	PPG	EFF
2	(Nigeria) Josh Akognon	1	1	17	60	20	100	0	2	1	0	11	6
3	(Serbia) Aleksandar Pavlović	7	3	16.3	68	33	79	2.5	1.3	1.3	0	10.1	10.1
4	(Serbia) Milenko Tepić	13	8	20.9	52	45	61	3.7	2.6	1	0.1	6.6	10.2
5	(Serbia) Petar Aranitović	2	0	6	33	0	0	1.5	1.5	0	0	1	1
8	(Slovenia) Edo Murić	12	9	24.1	41	32	72	3.8	2	0.8	0.2	9	7.5
9	(Serbia) Vanja Marinković	13	3	17.4	60	37	69	1.7	1.2	0.2	0.3	6.9	5.2
10	(France) Boris Dallo	13	4	13.4	39	28	63	2.4	2.5	0.8	0.2	3.9	5.7
11	(Serbia) Nikola Milutinov	13	11	25.6	61	0	63	8.7	2.1	0.5	1.2	12.6	20.7
12	(Serbia) Dragan Milosavljević	11	10	24.6	51	30	53	2.5	2.9	1.6	0.2	10.8	9.5
13	(Serbia) Milan Mačvan	12	6	24	58	44	73	7.5	2.3	0.3	0.4	11.5	18
14	(Serbia) Božo Đumić	13	2	9.4	68	0	31	2.1	0.4	0.2	0.2	3.3	3.1
21	(Serbia) Mihajlo Andrić	13	6	21.3	48	43	77	2.5	1	0.6	0.1	8	6.4
22	(Serbia) Andreja Milutinović	8	0	10	80	44	62	1.9	0.8	0.6	0	3.5	5.3
24	(Serbia) Miloš Glišić	8	0	8.1	64	0	75	1.7	0.4	0	0.1	2.1	2.1
33	(Serbia) Nemanja Bezbradica	9	2	9.4	70	50	63	1.8	0.2	0.1	0.1	5	5.3

=== Radivoj Korać Cup ===
==== Matches ====
Quarterfinals

19 February 2015
21:00

Report

Partizan NIS	81–54	Vojvodina Srbijagas
Scoring by quarter: 17–11, 16–6, 32–19, 16–18
Pts: Pavlović 14; Rebs: Tepić, Milutinov, Mačvan 7 Asts: Pavlović 3		Pts: Šešlija 9 Rebs: Popović 6 Asts: Novak, Popović, Grubor 2

Čair Sports Center, Niš
Attendance: 4,400
Referees: Marko Juras, Caslav Cukalovic, Vladimir Veskovic

Semirfinals

21 February 2015
21:00

Report

Partizan NIS	67–76	Crvena Zvezda Telekom
Scoring by quarter: 18–26, 16–17, 16–13, 17–20
Pts: Mačvan 20; Rebs: Murić, Milutinov, Mačvan 5 Asts: Milosavljević 3		Pts: Blažič 15; Rebs: Mitrović 7 Asts: Williams 2

Čair Sports Center, Niš
Attendance: 4,500
Referees: Ilija Belosevic, Milivoje Jovcic, Milija Vojinovic

==== Statistics ====
#	Player	GP	GS	MPG	FG%	3FG%	FT%	RPG	APG	SPG	BPG	PPG	EFF
3	(Serbia) Aleksandar Pavlović	2	1	19.7	55.6	33.3	77.8	2.5	1.5	0.5	1.5	14	14.5
4	(Serbia) Milenko Tepić	2	2	26.5	41.7	0	100	5	0.5	0.5	0	6	8
7	(Greece) Giannis Kouzeloglou	1	0	8.1	100	0	0	4	0	0	0	2	7
8	(Slovenia) Edo Murić	2	1	21.3	18.8	14.3	80	4	0.5	1.5	0.5	5.5	2
9	(Serbia) Vanja Marinković	2	0	14.3	22.2	33.3	50	1.5	0.5	0	0	4	-0.5
10	(France) Boris Dallo	2	0	10	50	66.6	3	1	0.5	0	0	3	5
11	(Serbia) Nikola Milutinov	2	1	22.2	50	0	66.6	6	0	0.5	0.5	7	7.5
12	(Serbia) Dragan Milosavljević	2	2	22.7	35	50	40	4	2	0	0	10	6
13	(Serbia) Milan Mačvan	2	1	25.3	53.4	50	60	6	1	0.5	0	13.5	15.5
14	(Serbia) Božo Đumić	2	1	13.4	70	0	0	3	0	0.5	0.5	7	5.5
21	(Serbia) Mihajlo Andrić	1	0	12.6	33.3	0	100	0	1	0	0	3	1
22	(Serbia) Andreja Milutinović	1	0	8.2	0	0	0	0	0	1	0	0	0
33	(Serbia) Nemanja Bezbradica	2	1	9.3	20	0	50	1	0	0	0.5	1.5	-1.5

=== Adriatic League ===
==== Standings ====
	Team	Pld	W	L	PF	PA	Diff	Points	%
1	(Serbia) Crvena zvezda Telekom	26	24	2	2147	1790	+357	50	.923
2	(Montenegro) Budućnost VOLI	26	19	7	1993	1816	+177	45	.731
3	(Croatia) Cedevita	26	18	8	2004	1838	+166	44	.692
4	(Serbia) Partizan NIS	26	18	8	1924	1778	+146	44	.692

Pld – Played; W – Won; L – Lost; PF – Points for; PA – Points against; Diff – Difference; Pts – Points.

==== Results and positions by round ====
Round	1	2	3	4	5	6	7	8	9	10	11	12	13	14	15	16	17	18	19	20	21	22	23	24	25	26
Ground	A	H	A	A	H	A	H	A	H	A	H	A	H	H	A	H	H	A	H	A	H	A	H	A	H	A
Result	W	L	L	L	W	L	W	W	W	L	W	L	L	W	W	W	W	W	W	W	W	W	W	W	W	L
Position	6	7	9	12	10	10	8	7	6	6	5	5	7	6	5	4	4	4	4	4	4	4	3	3	3	4

Updated to match(es) played on 22 March 2015. Source: abaliga.com
A = Away; H = Home; W = Win; D = Draw; L = Loss

==== Matches ====
Regular Season

4 October 2014
18:00

Stats

Szolnoki (Hungary)	55–60	(Serbia) Partizan NIS
Scoring by quarter: 11–10, 14–19, 12–15, 18–16
Pts: Vojvoda 18; Rebs: Vojvoda 10; Asts: Vojvoda 4		Pts: Tepić, Andrić 13; Rebs: Dallo 9 Asts: Dallo 5

Tiszaligeti Sportcsarnok
Szolnok, Hungary
Attendance: 1,500
Referees: Srdjan Dožai (CRO), Sašo Petek (SLO), Boris Krejić (SLO).

8 October 2014
20:00

Stats

Partizan NIS (Serbia)	64–68	(Slovenia) Krka
Scoring by quarter: 15–17, 16–14, 18–20, 15–17
Pts: Murić 22; Rebs: Milutinov 10; Asts: Milutinov 3		Pts: Armstead 26; Rebs: Booker 12; Asts: Hukić, Rojc 3

Pionir Hall
Belgrade, Serbia
Attendance: 6,500
Referees: Sreten Radović (CRO), Tomislav Hordov (CRO), Nikola Perlić (CRO).

11 October 2014
19:00

Stats

Cedevita (Croatia)	70–50	(Serbia) Partizan NIS
Scoring by quarter: 17–13, 12–11, 17–11, 24–15
Pts: Bilan 13; Rebs: Bilan 9 Asts: Gordić 6		Pts: Murić, Gagić 10; Rebs: Bogdanović 7 Asts: Andrić 3

Dom Sportova
Zagreb, Croatia
Attendance: 1,917
Referees: Saša Pukl (SLO), Damir Javor (SLO), Mario Majkić (SLO).

19 October 2014
17:00

Stats

Union Olimpija (Slovenia)	87–58	(Serbia) Partizan NIS
Scoring by quarter: 22–18, 23–15, 17–12, 25–13
Pts: Mahkovic 19; Rebs: Hrovat 7 Asts: Marinović 8		Pts: Murić 17; Rebs: Gagić 10; Asts: Murić 5

Stožice
Ljubljana, Slovenia
Attendance: 4,000
Referees: Sreten Radović (CRO), Siniša Herceg (CRO), Tomislav Vovk (CRO).

25 October 2014
19:00

Stats

Partizan NIS (Serbia)	84–77	(Serbia) Metalac Farmakom
Scoring by quarter: 12–23, 22–22, 25–12, 25–20
Pts: Andrić 18; Rebs: Gagić 10; Asts: Tepić 5		Pts: Kutlešić, Todorović 12; Rebs: Jošilo 7 Asts: Ljubičić 12

Pionir Hall
Belgrade, Serbia
Attendance: 2,500
Referees: Milivoje Jovčić (SRB), Radomir Vojinović (MNE), Marko Juras (SRB).

2 November 2014
19:00

Stats

Igokea (Bosnia and Herzegovina)	83–77	(Serbia) Partizan NIS
Scoring by quarter: 17–17, 22–15, 24–23, 20–22
Pts: Torlak 17; Rebs: Bunić 10; Asts: Drenovac 4		Pts: Murić 18; Rebs: Bogdanović 8 Asts: Tepić 4

Laktaši Sports Hall
Laktaši, Bosnia and Herzegovina
Attendance: 3,000
Referees: Saša Pukl (SLO), Radomir Vojinović (MNE), Igor Dragojević (MNE).

8 November 2014
21:00

Stats

Partizan NIS (Serbia)	65–50	(North Macedonia) MZT Skopje Aerodrom
Scoring by quarter: 11–15, 18–14, 21–11, 15–10
Pts: Marinković 20; Rebs: Milutinov 11; Asts: Dallo 4		Pts: Stojanovski 10; Rebs: Klassen 7 Asts: Stojanovski 3

Pionir Hall
Belgrade, Serbia
Attendance: 4,500
Referees: Matej Boltauzer (SLO), Sašo Petek (SLO), Boris Krejić (SLO).

15 November 2014
18:00

Stats

Levski Sofia (Bulgaria)	66–98	(Serbia) Partizan NIS
Scoring by quarter: 14–21, 16–19, 23–28, 13–30
Pts: Pavl. Ivanov 20; Rebs: Marinov, Dimitrov 4 Asts: Marinov 8		Pts: Milutinov 21; Rebs: Milutinov 10; Asts: Mačvan, Milutinović 5

Universiada Hall
Sofia, Bulgaria
Attendance: 3,000
Referees: Radomir Vojinović (MNE), Miloš Koljenšić (MNE), Vladan Sundić (MNE).

23 November 2014
19:00

Stats

Partizan NIS (Serbia)	73–64	(Croatia) Cibona
Scoring by quarter: 24–16, 21–14, 16–20, 12–14
Pts: Milutinov 18; Rebs: Milutinov 10; Asts: Murić, Mačvan 4		Pts: Rozić, Blassingame, Ilievski 14; Rebs: Rozić 7 Asts: Blassingame 5

Pionir Hall
Belgrade, Serbia
Attendance: 6,000
Referees: Saša Pukl (SLO), Damir Javor (SLO), Marko Vučković (SLO).

30 November 2014
19:00

Stats

Crvena zvezda Telekom (Serbia)	76–67	(Serbia) Partizan NIS
Scoring by quarter: 19–14, 19–8, 19–14, 19–31
Pts: Lazić 15; Rebs: Marjanović 8 Asts: Williams 5		Pts: Mačvan 20; Rebs: Milutinov 9 Asts: Mačvan, Marinković 3

Pionir Hall
Belgrade, Serbia
Attendance: 4,610
Referees: Srdjan Dozai (CRO), Siniša Herceg (CRO), Tomislav Hordov (CRO).

7 December 2014
19:00

Stats

Partizan NIS (Serbia)	89–80	(Serbia) Mega Leks
Scoring by quarter: 18–14, 25–19, 16–26, 30–21
Pts: Pavlović 26; Rebs: Milutinov, Mačvan 11; Asts: Mačvan 6		Pts: Bojić 22; Rebs: Bojić 7 Asts: Miljenović 5

Pionir Hall
Belgrade, Serbia
Attendance: 5,500
Referees: Ilija Belošević (SRB), Radomir Vojinović (MNE), Zdravko Rutešić (MNE).

13 December 2014
19:00

Stats

Zadar (Croatia)	69–68	(Serbia) Partizan NIS
Scoring by quarter: 15–12, 19–15, 16–15, 19–26
Pts: Florence 25; Rebs: Sobin 8 Asts: Florence 4		Pts: Mačvan 14; Rebs: Mačvan 13; Asts: Pavlović, Dallo, Tepić 2

Krešimir Ćosić Hall
Zadar, Croatia
Attendance: 4,000
Referees: Saša Pukl (SLO), Petar Obradović (BIH), Miloš Koljenšić (MNE).

21 December 2014
19:00

Stats

Partizan NIS (Serbia)	61–72	(Montenegro) Budućnost VOLI
Scoring by quarter: 16–19, 10–20, 14–8, 21–25
Pts: Milosavljević 14; Rebs: Mačvan 7 Asts: Tepić 4		Pts: Šehović 18; Rebs: Šehović 15; Asts: Cook 7

Pionir Hall
Belgrade, Serbia
Attendance: 6,500
Referees: Sreten Radović (CRO), Matej Boltauzer (SLO), Tomislav Vovk (CRO).

23 December 2014
20:00

Stats

Partizan NIS (Serbia)	62–55	(Hungary) Szolnoki
Scoring by quarter: 16–12, 13–18, 17–14, 16–11
Pts: Pavlović 13; Rebs: Milutinov 16; Asts: Pavlović 4		Pts: Jones 25; Rebs: Keller 8 Asts: Jones 4

Pionir Hall
Belgrade, Serbia
Attendance: 4,500
Referees: Tomislav Hordov (CRO), Sašo Petek (SLO), Mario Majkić (SLO).

27 December 2014
21:00

Stats

Krka (Slovenia)	72–78	(Serbia) Partizan NIS
Scoring by quarter: 17–21, 15–17, 20–23, 20–17
Pts: Armstead 18; Rebs: Booker 7 Asts: Armstead 6		Pts: Mačvan 24; Rebs: Mačvan 8 Asts: Mačvan 6

Leon Štukelj Hall
Novo Mesto, Slovenia
Attendance: 1,400
Referees: Sreten Radović (CRO), Siniša Herceg (CRO), Alfred Jovović (CRO).

4 January 2015
17:00

Stats

Partizan NIS (Serbia)	76–64	(Croatia) Cedevita
Scoring by quarter: 16–7, 23–17, 21–20, 16–20
Pts: Pavlović 19; Rebs: Mačvan 11; Asts: Mačvan 5		Pts: Bilan 20; Rebs: Bilan 12; Asts: Ukić 4

Pionir Hall
Belgrade, Serbia
Attendance: 7,000
Referees: Saša Pukl (SLO), Matej Boltauzer (SLO), Sašo Petek (SLO).

10 January 2015
21:00

Stats

Partizan NIS (Serbia)	81–74	(Slovenia) Union Olimpija
Scoring by quarter: 24–22, 14–17, 16–11, 27–24
Pts: Mačvan 21; Rebs: Milutinov 12; Asts: Andrić 6		Pts: Marinović 14; Rebs: Murić 10; Asts: Marinović 7

Pionir Hall
Belgrade, Serbia
Attendance: 7,000
Referees: Srdjan Dozai (CRO), Tomislav Hordov (CRO), Aleksandar Milojević (MKD).

17 January 2015
19:00

Stats

Metalac Farmakom (Serbia)	72–83	(Serbia) Partizan NIS
Scoring by quarter: 17–25, 21–20, 22–18, 12–20
Pts: Ljubičić 19; Rebs: Ljubičić 5 Asts: Ljubičić 5		Pts: Mačvan 15; Rebs: Milutinov, Pavlović 8 Asts: Pavlović, Tepić 4

Valjevo Sports Hall
Valjevo, Serbia
Attendance: 2,000
Referees: Sreten Radović (CRO), Sašo Petek (SLO), Tomislav Vovk (CRO).

24 January 2015
21:00

Stats

Partizan NIS (Serbia)	74–65	(Bosnia and Herzegovina) Igokea
Scoring by quarter: 21–13, 17–15, 19–21, 17–16
Pts: Mačvan, Milosavljević 13; Rebs: Milutinov 9 Asts: Murić 4		Pts: Čakarević 18; Rebs: Bunić 7 Asts: Jones 7

Pionir Hall
Belgrade, Serbia
Attendance: 7,000
Referees: Siniša Herceg (CRO), Josip Radojković (CRO), Tamás Benczur (HUN).

30 January 2015
18:00

Stats

MZT Skopje Aerodrom (North Macedonia)	55–63	(Serbia) Partizan NIS
Scoring by quarter: 19–24, 11–14, 19–10, 6–15
Pts: Šehović 19; Rebs: Samardžiski 8 Asts: Cvetković 4		Pts: Pavlović 13; Rebs: Mačvan 7 Asts: Milutinov 3

Jane Sandanski
Skopje, Macedonia
Attendance: 5,123
Referees: Sašo Petek (SLO), Mario Majkić (SLO), Boris Krejić (SLO).

9 February 2015
18:00

Stats

Partizan NIS (Serbia)	94–66	(Bulgaria) Levski Sofia
Scoring by quarter: 22–22, 24–17, 22–19, 26–8
Pts: Murić 15; Rebs: Marinković 8 Asts: Tepić, Dallo, Milosavljević, Mačvan 3		Pts: Videnov 25; Rebs: Angelov 4 Asts: Karamfilov 4

Pionir Hall
Belgrade, Serbia
Attendance: 6,500
Referees: Srdjan Dozai (CRO), Aleksandar Milojević (MKD), Tamás Benczur (HUN).

15 February 2015
19:00

Stats

Cibona (Croatia)	64–81	(Serbia) Partizan NIS
Scoring by quarter: 21–25, 7–25, 13–18, 23–13
Pts: Žižić 17; Rebs: Žižić 8 Asts: Mavra 5		Pts: Pavlović 17; Rebs: Murić, Milutinov 8 Asts: Milosavljević 5

Dražen Petrović
Zagreb, Croatia
Attendance: 1,500
Referees: Saša Pukl (SLO), Mario Majkić (SLO), Boris Krejić (SLO).

1 March 2015
19:00

Stats

Partizan NIS (Serbia)	77–63	(Serbia) Crvena zvezda Telekom
Scoring by quarter: 15–17, 23–16, 21–8, 18–22
Pts: Pavlović 19; Rebs: Mačvan 10; Asts: Pavlović, Milutinov 3		Pts: Jenkins 20; Rebs: Williams 5 Asts: Williams 4

Pionir Hall
Belgrade, Serbia
Attendance: 6,500
Referees: Saša Pukl (SLO), Sreten Radović (CRO), Matej Boltauzer (SLO).

9 March 2015
20:30

Stats

Mega Leks (Serbia)	73–75	(Serbia) Partizan NIS
Scoring by quarter: 17–25, 17–16, 12–13, 27–21
Pts: Kešelj 23; Rebs: Musli 10; Asts: Miljenović 7		Pts: Mačvan 23; Rebs: Mačvan 9 Asts: Milosavljević 4

Sports Hall Pinki
Sremska Mitrovica, Serbia
Attendance: 2,500
Referees: Siniša Herceg (CRO), Radomir Vojinović (MNE), Igor Mitrovski (MKD).

16 March 2015
20:30

Stats

Partizan NIS (Serbia)	87–53	(Croatia) Zadar
Scoring by quarter: 15–20, 21–8, 23–11, 28–14
Pts: Akognon 16; Rebs: Mačvan 10; Asts: Mačvan 4		Pts: Sobin 16; Rebs: Sobin, Ivanov 6 Asts: Segarić 4

Pionir Hall
Belgrade, Serbia
Attendance: 6,500
Referees: Damir Javor (SLO), Sašo Petek (SLO), Boris Krejić (SLO).

22 March 2015
17:00

Stats

Budućnost VOLI (Montenegro)	85–79	(Serbia) Partizan NIS
Scoring by quarter: 19–24, 24–20, 23–25, 19–10
Pts: Reynolds 24; Rebs: Planinić 10; Asts: Reynolds 5		Pts: Pavlović, Murić 16; Rebs: Mačvan 9 Asts: Mačvan, Akognon 3

Morača
Podgorica, Montenegro
Attendance: 5,100
Referees: Saša Pukl (SLO), Srdjan Dožai (CRO), Damir Javor (SLO).

Semi-finals

14 April 2015
21:00

Stats

Crvena zvezda Telekom (Serbia)	73–64	(Serbia) Partizan NIS (1–0)
Scoring by quarter: 24–13, 14–18, 17–21, 18–12
Pts: Jenkins 19; Rebs: Marjanović 9 Asts: Kalinić, Williams 3		Pts: Mačvan 12; Rebs: Mačvan 12; Asts: Mačvan 5

Pionir Hall
Belgrade, Serbia
Attendance: 5,932
Referees: Sreten Radović (CRO), Milivoje Jovčić (SRB), Damir Javor (SLO).

15 April 2015
21:00

Stats

Crvena zvezda Telekom (Serbia)	68–70	(Serbia) Partizan NIS (1–1)
Scoring by quarter: 17–22, 18–20, 13–16, 20–12
Pts: Jenkins 19; Rebs: Marjanović 8 Asts: Williams 3		Pts: Mačvan 14; Rebs: Mačvan 17; Asts: Milutinov 4

Pionir Hall
Belgrade, Serbia
Attendance: 5,983
Referees: Srdjan Dozai (CRO), Matej Boltauzer (SLO), Siniša Herceg (CRO).

18 April 2015
21:00

Stats

Partizan NIS (Serbia)	85–95	(Serbia) Crvena zvezda Telekom (1–2)
Scoring by quarter: 20–26, 24–25, 18–22, 23–22
Pts: Milosavljević 23; Rebs: Mačvan 5 Asts: Tepić 3		Pts: Kalinić 25; Rebs: Mitrović 9 Asts: Mitrović 5

Pionir Hall
Belgrade, Serbia
Attendance: 7,000
Referees: Ilija Belošević (SRB), Sreten Radović (CRO), Damir Javor (SLO).

19 April 2015
21:00

Stats

Partizan NIS (Serbia)	73–81	(Serbia) Crvena zvezda Telekom (1–3)
Scoring by quarter: 24–22, 12–16, 22–26, 15–17
Pts: Murić 25; Rebs: Milutinov 8 Asts: Milosavljević, Murić 3		Pts: Jenkins, Williams 19; Rebs: Marjanović 14; Asts: Mitrović, Jović, Jenkins 3

Pionir Hall
Belgrade, Serbia
Attendance: 7,000
Referees: Saša Pukl (SLO), Sašo Petek (SLO), Tomislav Hordov (CRO).

==== Statistics ====
#	Player	GP	GS	MPG	FG%	3FG%	FT%	RPG	APG	SPG	BPG	PPG	EFF
2	(Nigeria) Josh Akognon	6	3	18.3	45.1	43.3	50	1.5	1.5	0.3	0	10.5	5.5
3	(Serbia) Aleksandar Pavlović	19	12	21.8	38.2	31.9	72.4	3.7	1.9	0.9	0.3	11.9	8.7
4	(Serbia) Milenko Tepić	28	22	26.6	39.8	16.9	67.9	4.1	2.5	0.8	0	6.9	8.8
5	(Serbia) Petar Aranitović	2	0	1.5	50	0	0	0	0	0	0	1	0
7	(Greece) Giannis Kouzeloglou	3	0	1.7	66.7	100	0	0	0	0	0	1.7	1.3
8	(Slovenia) Edo Murić	21	12	26.1	39.9	30.9	83.6	4	2	1.6	0.2	11.3	10.1
9	(Serbia) Vanja Marinković	29	8	13.1	37.6	38.5	63.2	1.2	0.7	0.2	0.1	3.9	2
10	(France) Boris Dallo	27	2	10.4	36	10	66.7	1.5	1.4	0.3	0	2.9	2.6
11	(Serbia) Nikola Milutinov	29	20	28	57.3	0	58.7	7.6	1.3	0.4	0.8	9.8	14.4
12	(Serbia) Dragan Milosavljević	20	20	27.6	39	28.6	86.4	3.7	1.7	1	0.1	11	9.9
13	(Serbia) Milan Mačvan	25	19	27.8	50.8	30.2	78.1	7.6	2.6	0.8	0.3	11.6	17.9
14	(Serbia) Božo Đumić	9	7	9.9	50	0	66.7	1.7	0.2	0.2	0.6	2.4	1.9
14	(Serbia) Đorđe Gagić	18	10	16.7	52.7	0	71.1	4	1.4	0.8	0.9	9.6	11.5
21	(Serbia) Mihajlo Andrić	29	10	20.5	40.7	39.4	75	1.4	1.3	0.3	0.1	6.1	3.5
22	(Serbia) Andreja Milutinović	14	2	8.4	37.9	27.3	61.5	1	0.6	0.4	0	2.4	2.1
33	(Serbia) Nemanja Bezbradica	15	1	7.2	39.4	11.1	55.6	2	0	0.2	0.3	2.1	2.6
35	(Serbia) Luka Bogdanović	16	2	13	37.7	28.1	85.7	2.7	0.8	0.4	0.1	3.8	4.4
55	(Serbia) Đoko Šalić	8	0	4.3	30	0	0	0.8	0	0	0.1	0.8	-0.8

=== Eurocup ===
==== Statistics ====
#	Player	GP	GS	MPG	2FG%	3FG%	FT%	RPG	APG	SPG	BPG	PPG	EFF
3	(Serbia) Aleksandar Pavlović	2	0	11:39	45.5	0	80	1	0	0	0	7	1
4	(Serbia) Milenko Tepić	10	10	31:06	46.2	27.3	70.6	5.2	3.5	0.7	0.1	8.7	10.5
5	(Serbia) Petar Aranitović	2	0	02:42	0	0	100	0.5	0	0	0	1	-1
7	(Greece) Giannis Kouzeloglou	1	0	02:45	0	0	0	0	0	0	0	0	-2
8	(Slovenia) Edo Murić	7	7	31:49	53.4	21.9	68.2	4.1	2.4	1	0.3	14	10.7
9	(Serbia) Vanja Marinković	10	4	14:40	33.3	35.7	71.4	1.9	0.5	0.4	0	5.5	2.9
10	(France) Boris Dallo	9	0	11:08	30	16.7	100	1.9	0.7	0.4	0	2.1	1.3
11	(Serbia) Nikola Milutinov	9	8	22:27	44.2	0	77.3	3	1.3	0.4	0.3	7	8.4
12	(Serbia) Dragan Milosavljević	3	3	20:41	41.7	55.6	0	2.7	4.3	0.3	0	8.3	8.3
13	(Serbia) Milan Mačvan	6	4	28:39	68.5	33.3	95	8.7	3.8	0.2	0.7	18	26
14	(Serbia) Đorđe Gagić	9	5	23:21	46	0	81.3	5.7	2.6	1	0.7	9.3	13.3
21	(Serbia) Mihajlo Andrić	10	4	25:28	41.2	45.8	87.5	1.9	1.9	0.7	0	8.7	7.2
22	(Serbia) Andreja Milutinović	9	3	09:41	53.3	25	100	0.9	0.9	0.3	0	2.8	2
24	(Serbia) Miloš Glišić	1	0	06:33	50	0	0	0	0	0	0	2	0
33	(Serbia) Nemanja Bezbradica	5	1	07:25	33.3	0	20	1.2	0.8	0	0	1	1
35	(Serbia) Luka Bogdanović	10	1	16:53	50	39.1	81.8	3	0.6	0.5	0	5.8	6.2
55	(Serbia) Đoko Šalić	4	0	02:55	50	0	0	0.5	0	0	0	0.5	0

Updated: 17 December 2014

==== Standings ====
Group E

width=25	Team	Pld	W	L	PF	PA	Diff	Tie-break
1.	(Lithuania) Lietuvos Rytas	10	8	2	840	774	+66	
2.	(Turkey) Banvit	10	6	4	788	768	+20	1–1 (+3)
3.	(Russia) Krasny Oktyabr	10	6	4	759	765	–6	1–1 (-3)
4.	(Romania) Asesoft Ploiești	10	5	5	814	833	-19	
5.	(Serbia) Partizan NIS	10	3	7	734	774	–40	
6.	(Israel) Hapoel Jerusalem	10	2	8	806	827	–21	

==== Fixtures and results ====
All times given below are in Central European Time.

15 October 2014
18:30

Report

Lietuvos Rytas (Lithuania)	92–65	(Serbia) Partizan NIS
Scoring by quarter: 30–21, 17–8, 23–25, 22–11
Pts: Leslie, Lukauskis 18; Rebs: Leslie 10; Asts: Gecevičius, Juškevičius 6		Pts: Gagić, Milutinov 12; Rebs: Tepić 6 Asts: Milutinov 4

Lietuvos rytas Arena, Vilnius
Attendance: 2.140
Referees: HIERREZUELO, DANI (ESP), KALPAKAS, APOSTOLOS (SWE), COLLIN, JEAN-CHARLES (FRA).

22 October 2014
18:00

Report

Partizan NIS (Serbia)	61–77	(Turkey) Banvit
Scoring by quarter: 18–19, 21–29, 11–14, 11–15
Pts: Mačvan 15; Rebs: Mačvan 7 Asts: Mačvan 5		Pts: Dragičević 20; Rebs: Veremeenko, Mejia 6 Asts: Rowland 7

Pionir Hall, Belgrade
Attendance: 4.500
Referees: CHRISTODOULOU, CHRISTOS (GRE), SHEMMESH, SEFFI (ISR), OVINOV, SEMEN (RUS).

29 October 2014
18:30

Report

Hapoel Jerusalem (Israel)	82–79	(Serbia) Partizan NIS
Scoring by quarter: 18–20, 24–26, 14–20, 26–13
Pts: Eliyahu 22; Rebs: Smith, Eliyahu 6 Asts: Halperin 7		Pts: Murić 21; Rebs: Murić 7 Asts: Tepić 8

Arena Jerusalem, Jerusalem
Attendance: 4.000
Referees: GKONTAS, SPIROS (GRE), ZIEMBLICKI, GRZEGORZ (POL), PUTENKO, ILYA (RUS).

5 November 2014
17:00

Report

Krasny Oktyabr (Russia)	61–59	(Serbia) Partizan NlS
Scoring by quarter: 15–12, 17–13, 15–16, 14–18
Pts: Culpepper 13; Rebs: Travis 8 Asts: Ponkrashov 4		Pts: Milutinov 13; Rebs: Milutinov 9 Asts: Tepić, Murić 3

Sports Palace Volgograd, Volgograd
Attendance: 3.024
Referees: PATERNICO, CARMELO (ITA), ROMANO, DAVID (ISR), REITER, MORITZ (GER).

12 November 2014
18:00

Report

Partizan NlS (Serbia)	76–69	(Romania) Asesoft Ploiești
Scoring by quarter: 25–23, 18–15, 11–20, 22–11
Pts: Marinković 19; Rebs: Milutinov 9 Asts: Tepić 6		Pts: Lee, Brown 13; Rebs: Cooper 7 Asts: Brown 6

Pionir Hall, Belgrade
Attendance: 5.000
Referees: BIRICIK, MURAT (TUR), ZASHCHUK, SERGIY (UKR), BISSANG, JOSEPH (FRA).

18 November 2014
20:45

Report

Partizan NlS (Serbia)	76–85	(Lithuania) Lietuvos Rytas
Scoring by quarter: 16–18, 16–20, 26–26, 18–21
Pts: Mačvan 22; Rebs: Mačvan, Milutinov 7 Asts: Mačvan 3		Pts: Kavaliauskas 23; Rebs: Kavaliauskas 7 Asts: Gecevičius, Orelik 6

Pionir Hall, Belgrade
Attendance: 5.800
Referees: SHULGA, BORIS (UKR), JIMENEZ, BENJAMIN (ESP), LANZARINI, SAVERIO (ITA).

26 November 2014
18:00

Report

Banvit (Turkey)	90–85 (OT)	(Serbia) Partizan NlS
Scoring by quarter: 24–25, 25–17, 20–23, 14–18, Overtime: 7–2
Pts: Dragičević 20; Rebs: Rowland 7 Asts: Mejia 6		Pts: Tepić 21; Rebs: Gagić 11; Asts: Gagić 6

Kara Ali Acar, Bandırma
Attendance: 2.800
Referees: TAURINO, PAOLO (ITA), DAVYDOV, ALEXEY (RUS), VAN DEN BROECK, NICK (BEL).

3 December 2014
18:00

Report

Partizan NlS (Serbia)	64–83	(Israel) Hapoel Jerusalem
Scoring by quarter: 14–15, 23–20, 16–27, 11–21
Pts: Mačvan 26; Rebs: Mačvan 12; Asts: Mačvan 4		Pts: Jones 16; Rebs: Smith 6 Asts: Smith 6

Pionir Hall, Belgrade
Attendance: 6.000
Referees: KOROMILAS, ELIAS (GRE), MATTIOLI, GIANLUCA (ITA), LAURINAVICIUS, JURGIS (LTU).

10 December 2014
18:00

Report

Partizan NlS (Serbia)	84–70	(Russia) Krasny Oktyabr
Scoring by quarter: 23–14, 18–26, 25–14, 18–14
Pts: Milosavljević 17; Rebs: Mačvan 12; Asts: Tepić 7		Pts: Culpepper 14; Rebs: Travis 7 Asts: Travis, Liggins 3

Pionir Hall, Belgrade
Attendance: 2.000
Referees: CMIKIEWICZ, MAREK (POL), MICHAELIDES, MARKOS (SUI), MARTOLINI, ALESSANDRO (ITA).

17 December 2014
18:30

Report

Asesoft Ploiești (Romania)	65–85	(Serbia) Partizan NlS
Scoring by quarter: 16–23, 16–20, 10–30, 23–12
Pts: Brown 14; Rebs: Cooper 9 Asts: Brown 9		Pts: Mačvan 23; Rebs: Mačvan 8 Asts: Mačvan, Milosavljević 6

Olimpia, Ploiești
Attendance: 2.000
Referees: BIRICIK, MURAT (TUR), LOPES, LUIS (POR), DAVYDOV, ALEXEY (RUS).

=== Charity game "Grobari za nas" ===
On Wednesday, 11 March 2015 Partizan fans have organized a charity match between Partizan former players and active players mixed in white and black team. The reason for organizing this activity is to help KK Partizan which is in a very difficult Financial situation. Money was collected from ticket sales, and responded to the call by many celebrities and former athletes.

11 March 2015
20:00

White (Serbia)	111–114	(Serbia) Black
Scoring by quarter: 25–28, 25–36, 28–37, 33–13

Pionir Hall, Belgrade
Attendance: 7,600 (tentative)
Referees: Vojislav Vuković, Zoran Dimitrijević, Milorad Milojković.

Starters:
PG	2	(Nigeria) Josh Akognon (4 pts)
SG	4	(Montenegro) Vlado Šćepanović (7 pts)
SF	8	(Slovenia) Edo Murić (11 pts)
PF	9	(Serbia) Goran Grbović (4 pts)
C	12	(Serbia) Dejan Tomašević (8 pts)
Reserves:
SG	4	(Serbia) Milenko Tepić (4 pts)
PG	5	(Serbia) Nebojša Zorkić (1 pts)
SG	21	(Serbia) Mihajlo Andrić (12 pts)
SG	20	(Serbia) Petar Božić (5 pts)
SG	9	(Serbia) Vanja Marinković (5 pts)
SF	15	(Serbia) Nenad Čanak (11 pts)
SF	33	(Serbia) Nemanja Bezbradica (2 pts)
C	11	(Serbia) Nikola Milutinov
SF	7	(Greece) Giannis Kouzeloglou (15 pts)
SG	14	(Serbia) Vladimir Dragutinović (2 pts)
Head coach:
(Montenegro) Duško Vujošević
Assistant coach:
(Serbia) Žarko Stijović

Starters:
PG	12	(Serbia) Dragan Milosavljević (12 pts)
SG	7	(Serbia) Dušan Kecman (7 pts)
SF	3	(Serbia) Aleksandar Pavlović (10 pts)
PF	13	(Serbia) Dejan Milojević (6 pts)
C	13	(Serbia) Milan Mačvan (10 pts)
Reserves:
PG	10	(France) Boris Dallo (9 pts)
PG	14	(Serbia) Vule Avdalović (7 pts)
SF	5	(Serbia) Veselin Petrović (10 pts)
SF	22	(Serbia) Andreja Milutinović (8 pts)
PF	7	(Serbia) Aleksandar Čubrilo (13 pts)
C	14	(Serbia) Božo Đumić
PF	24	(Serbia) Miloš Glišić (2 pts)
PG	5	(Serbia) Petar Aranitović (2 pts)
SG	13	(Serbia) Miroslav Radošević (6 pts)
PG	19	(Serbia) Aleksandar Đorđević (3 pts)
SG	5	(Serbia) Predrag Danilović (8 pts)
Head coach:
(Serbia) Vlada Jovanović
Assistant coach:
(Serbia) Dragan Todorić

== Individual awards ==
Eurocup

Eurocup MVP of the Round

- (Serbia) Milan Mačvan – Regular season, Week 10

Adriatic League

The ideal five

- (Serbia) Aleksandar Pavlović
- (Serbia) Milan Mačvan

MVP of the Month

- (Serbia) Milan Mačvan – January 2015

MVP of the Round

- (Serbia) Milan Mačvan – Round 17
- (Serbia) Milan Mačvan – Semi-finals, Game 2
- (Slovenia) Edo Murić – Semi-finals, Game 4

Basketball League of Serbia

MVP of the Round

- (Serbia) Nikola Milutinov – Round 1
- (Serbia) Milan Mačvan – Round 2
