= 2015–16 KK Partizan season =

Serbian basketball squad and matches

Partizan NIS Belgrade
2015–16 season
- President: Nikola Peković
- Head coach: Petar Božić (until 5 January 2016); Aleksandar Džikić
- Basketball League of Serbia: Runner-up
- Radivoj Korać Cup: Runner-up
- Adriatic League: 5th place

In the 2015–16 season, Partizan NIS Belgrade competed in the Basketball League of Serbia, the Radivoj Korać Cup and the Adriatic League.

== Players ==
=== Roster ===
Note: Flags indicate national team eligibility at FIBA-sanctioned events. Players may hold other non-FIBA nationalities not displayed.

KK Partizan NIS roster
Players
Coaches

Pos.	No.	Nat.	Name	Ht.	Wt.	Age
PG	4	(Serbia)	Cvetković, Aleksandar	1.88 m (6 ft 2 in)	75 kg (165 lb)	32 – 12 September 1993
G	5	(Serbia)	Aranitović, Petar	1.88 m (6 ft 2 in)	75 kg (165 lb)	31 – 20 September 1994
PF	6	(United States)	Jones, Kevin	2.03 m (6 ft 8 in)	113 kg (249 lb)	37 – 25 August 1989
SF	8	(Slovenia)	Murić, Edo	2.02 m (6 ft 8 in)	99 kg (218 lb)	34 – 27 November 1991
G	9	(Serbia)	Marinković, Vanja (C)	1.98 m (6 ft 6 in)	86 kg (190 lb)	29 – 9 January 1997
PF	12	(Serbia)	Veličković, Novica	2.05 m (6 ft 9 in)	109 kg (240 lb)	39 – 5 October 1986
PF	13	(Serbia)	Vitkovac, Čedomir	2.01 m (6 ft 7 in)	102 kg (225 lb)	43 – 28 October 1982
C	14	(Serbia)	Đumić, Božo	2.08 m (6 ft 10 in)	102 kg (225 lb)	34 – 7 January 1992
C	15	(Serbia)	Koprivica, Miloš	2.08 m (6 ft 10 in)	102 kg (225 lb)	31 – 24 March 1995
PG	19	(North Macedonia)	Magdevski, Andrej	1.92 m (6 ft 4 in)	85 kg (187 lb)	30 – 14 January 1996
SF	21	(Serbia)	Andrić, Mihajlo	2.00 m (6 ft 7 in)	88 kg (194 lb)	32 – 4 January 1994
G	22	(Serbia)	Milutinović, Andreja	1.98 m (6 ft 6 in)	94 kg (207 lb)	36 – 6 August 1990
C	25	(United States)	Williams, Darrell	2.03 m (6 ft 8 in)	111 kg (245 lb)	36 – 15 September 1989
SF	27	(Bosnia and Herzegovina)	Vrabac, Adin	2.05 m (6 ft 9 in)	90 kg (198 lb)	32 – 27 January 1994
PG	31	(Finland)	Wilson, Jamar	1.85 m (6 ft 1 in)	84 kg (185 lb)	42 – 22 February 1984

Head coach

- (Serbia) Aleksandar Džikić

Assistant coach(es)

- (Serbia) Dušan Kecman
- (Serbia) Nenad Čanak

Strength & conditioning coach(es)

- (Serbia) Mladen Mihajlović
- (Serbia) Zlatko Tešić

Physiotherapist(s)

- (Serbia) Predrag Šapina

Team manager

- (Serbia) Dragan Todorić

Legend

- (C) Team captain
- Injured

=== Roster changes ===
==== In ====
Pos.	Nat.	Name	Moving from	Source
C	(Serbia)	Miloš Koprivica	(Serbia) Sloboda Užice	
C	(Serbia)	Kosta Perović	(Russia) Enisey Krasnoyarsk	
PF	(Serbia)	Čedomir Vitkovac	(Montenegro) Budućnost	
PF	(United States)	Kevin Jones	(France) Cholet Basket	
SF	(Bosnia and Herzegovina)	Adin Vrabac	(Germany) TBB Trier	
SG	(Serbia)	Danilo Anđušić	(Spain) Bilbao Basket	
PG	(Finland)	Jamar Wilson	(France) SPO Rouen Basket	
PG	(Serbia)	Aleksandar Cvetković	(North Macedonia) MZT Skopje	
PG	(North Macedonia)	Andrej Magdevski	(Spain) Axarquía	

==== Out ====
Pos.	Nat.	Name	Moving to	Source
C	(Serbia)	Nikola Milutinov	(Greece) Olympiacos	
PF	(Serbia)	Nemanja Bezbradica	(Bosnia and Herzegovina) Zrinjski Mostar	
PF	(Serbia)	Milan Mačvan	(Italy) Emporio Armani Milano	
SF	(Greece)	Ioannis Kouzeloglou	(Greece) Apollon Patras	
SG	(Serbia)	Dragan Milosavljević	(Germany) Alba Berlin	
SG	(Montenegro)	Aleksandar Pavlović	(Greece) Panathinaikos	.
PG	(France)	Boris Dallo	(France) Olympique Antibes	
PG	(Serbia)	Milenko Tepić	(Greece) PAOK	

== Pre-season and friendlies ==
23 September 2015	Panathinaikos (Greece)	66–56	(Serbia) Partizan Belgrade	Athens
	Scoring by quarter: 20–14, 14–12, 21–10, 11–20
	Pts: Pavlović 16	Report	Pts: Đumić 13	Arena: Olympic Indoor Hall

== Competitions ==
	Competition	Position	Record
(Serbia)	Basketball League of Serbia	Runners-up	9–4
(Serbia)	Radivoj Korać Cup	Runners-up	2–1
(European Union)	Adriatic League	5th place	12–14

== Adriatic League ==
=== Standings ===
Pos	Team	Pld	W	L	PF	PA	PD	Pts	Qualification or relegation
1	(Montenegro) Budućnost	26	23	3	2032	1774	+258	49	Qualification to playoffs
2	(Serbia) Crvena Zvezda	26	20	6	2046	1800	+246	46	Qualification to playoffs
3	(Croatia) Cedevita	26	19	7	2024	1879	+145	45	Qualification to playoffs
4	(Serbia) Mega Leks	26	17	9	2051	1940	+111	43	Qualification to playoffs
5	(Serbia) Partizan	26	12	14	1973	1974	−1	38	
6	(Croatia) Zadar	26	12	14	1808	1868	−60	38	
7	(Slovenia) Union Olimpija	26	11	15	1921	1955	−34	37	
8	(Croatia) Cibona	26	11	15	1887	1936	−49	37	
9	(Bosnia and Herzegovina) Igokea	26	11	15	1839	1899	−60	37	
10	(North Macedonia) MZT Skopje	26	10	16	1869	1908	−39	36	
11	(Serbia) Metalac	26	10	16	1837	1941	−104	36	
12	(Slovenia) Krka	26	10	16	1853	1924	−71	36	
13	(Montenegro) Sutjeska	26	9	17	1867	2011	−144	35	Relegated
14	(Slovenia) Tajfun	26	7	19	1790	1988	−198	33	Relegated

Source: ABA Standings

=== Regular season ===
2 October 2015 1	Metalac (Serbia)	67–64	(Serbia) Partizan	Valjevo
21:00	Scoring by quarter: 14-23, 14-14, 28-13, 11-14
	Pts: Kutlešić 13; Rebs: three players 7 Asts: Malešević 5	Report	Pts: Cvetković 13; Rebs: Vitkovac 9 Asts: Vrabac, Milutinović 3	Arena: Valjevo Sports Hall; Attendance: 1,500; Referees: Sašo Pukl (SLO), Sašo Petek (SLO), Bojan Jovanić (BIH)

4 October 2015 2	Mega Leks (Serbia)	76–59	(Serbia) Partizan	Sremska Mitrovica
17:00	Scoring by quarter: 18-11, 18-19, 17-18, 23-11
	Pts: Luwawu 27; Rebs: Samardžiski 10; Asts: Jaramaz 5	Report	Pts: Vrabac, Marinković 13; Rebs: Vrabac 6 Asts: Milutinović 5	Arena: Sports Hall Pinki; Attendance: 2,000; Referees: Saša Maričić (SRB), Aleksandar Glišić (SRB), Uroš Obrknežević (SRB)

6 October 2015 3	Partizan (Serbia)	72–69	(North Macedonia) MZT Skopje	Belgrade
21:00	Scoring by quarter: 23-25, 15-24, 17-12, 17-8
	Pts: Marinković 16; Rebs: Vitkovac 9 Asts: Vitkovac 2	Report	Pts: Stojanovski 14; Rebs: Luković 7 Asts: Ljubičić 6	Arena: Hall Aleksandar Nikolić; Attendance: 4,000; Referees: Matej Boltauzer (SLO), Miloš Koljenšić (MNE), Ademir Zurapović (BIH)

10 October 2015 4	Igokea (Bosnia and Herzegovina)	71–64	(Serbia) Partizan	Laktaši
17:00	Scoring by quarter: 11-13, 21-25, 21-12, 18-14
	Pts: two players 12; Rebs: Dimić 9 Asts: Radivojević 7	Report	Pts: Aranitović 24; Rebs: Vitkovac 8 Asts: six players 1	Arena: Laktaši Sports Hall; Attendance: 1,500; Referees: Saša Pukl (SLO), Damir Javor (SLO), Nikola Perić (CRO)

13 October 2015 5	Partizan (Serbia)	75–67	(Montenegro) Sutjeska	Belgrade
21:00	Scoring by quarter: 18-20, 25-12, 13-17, 19-18
	Pts: Cvetković 21; Rebs: Cvetković 6 Asts: Cvetković 6	Report	Pts: Albijanić 16; Rebs: Spasojević 8 Asts: Vranješ 4	Arena: Hall Aleksandar Nikolić; Attendance: 5,000; Referees: Sreten Radović (CRO), Tomislav Hordov (CRO), Josip Radojković (CRO)

17 October 2015 6	Cibona (Croatia)	63–57	(Serbia) Partizan	Zagreb
17:00	Scoring by quarter: 18-15, 11-13, 14-18, 20-11
	Pts: Krušlin 22; Rebs: Jagodić-Kuridža 7 Asts: Joksimović 5		Pts: Vitkovac 16; Rebs: Milutinović 10; Asts: Cvetković 4	Arena: Dražen Petrović Basketball Hall; Attendance: 2,000; Referees: Sašo Petek, Boris Krejić, Milan Nedović

24October 2015 7	Partizan (Serbia)	69–70	(Slovenia) Krka	Belgrade
19:00	Scoring by quarter: 18-20, 25-14, 11-22, 15-14
	Pts: Cvetković 15; Rebs: Cvetković 8 Asts: Cvetković 8	Report	Pts: Lalić 21; Rebs: Lalić 7 Asts: Sinovec 6	Arena: Hall Aleksandar Nikolić; Attendance: 4,000; Referees: Sreten Radović, Igor Mitrevski, Aleksandar Milojević

17 October 2015 8	Crvena zvezda (Serbia)	92–77	(Serbia) Partizan	Belgrade
17:00	Scoring by quarter: 13-24, 32-16, 23-20, 24-17
	Pts: Miller 17; Rebs: Štimac 9 Asts: Mekel 9		Pts: Aranitović 19; Rebs: Vitkovac 5 Asts: Cvetković 5	Arena: Hall Aleksandar Nikolić; Attendance: 3,836; Referees: Ilija Belošević, Marko Juras,

7 November 2015 9	Partizan (Serbia)	86–77	(Montenegro) Budućnost	Belgrade
21:00	Scoring by quarter: 22-20, 21-12, 25-19, 18-16
	Pts: Jones 18; Rebs: Jones 9 Asts: Anđušić 3		Pts: Joseph 15; Rebs: Šehović, Dragićević 5 Asts: Cook 7	Arena: Hall Aleksandar Nikolić; Attendance: 4,500; Referees: Damir Javor, Boris Krejić, Milan Nedović

16 November 2015 10	Zadar (Croatia)	65–61	(Serbia) Partizan	Zadar
21:00	Scoring by quarter: 21-14, 15-14, 15-23, 14-10
	Pts: Delaš 27; Rebs: Ramljak 8 Asts: Delaš 4		Pts: Jones 16; Rebs: Marinković 6 Asts: Cvetković, Anđušić 2	Arena: Krešimir Ćosić Hall; Attendance: 6,000; Referees: Saša Pukl, Sašo Petek, Zdravko Rutešić

20 November 2015 11	Partizan (Serbia)	89–85	(Slovenia) Tajfun	Belgrade
17:00	Scoring by quarter: 20-15, 19-27, 19-19, 31-24
	Pts: Jones 17; Rebs: Jones 9 Asts: Anđušić 3		Pts: Čebular 29; Rebs: Ponjavić 6 Asts: Bratož 7	Arena: Hall Aleksandar Nikolić; Attendance: 2,500; Referees: Siniša Herceg, Tomislav Vovk, Bojan Jovanić

29 November 2015 12	Cedevita (Croatia)	75–72	(Serbia) Partizan	Zagreb
19:00	Scoring by quarter: 17-23, 18-13, 14-16, 26-20
	Pts: Bilan 13; Rebs: Žorić 6 Asts: White 6		Pts: Jones 21; Rebs: Milutinović 9 Asts: Milutinović 4	Arena: Dom sportova Attendance: 2,380; Referees: Saša Pukl, Mario Majkić, Boris Krejić

5 December 2015 13	Partizan (Serbia)	76–74	(Slovenia) Union Olimpija	Belgrade
19:00	Scoring by quarter: 17-15, 22-17, 17-22, 20-20
	Pts: Wilson 21; Rebs: Jones 11; Asts: Aranitović 3		Pts: Zagorac 16; Rebs: Lešić 7 Asts: three players 3	Arena: Hall Aleksandar Nikolić; Attendance: 4,500; Referees: Srđan Dožai, Siniša Herceg, Nikola Perlić

13 December 2015 14	Partizan (Serbia)	81–70	(Serbia) Metalac	Belgrade
19:00	Scoring by quarter: 27-22, 20-21, 11-11, 23-16
	Pts: Aranitović 17; Rebs: Jones 10; Asts: Wilson 5		Pts: Jevtović 14; Rebs: Jevtović 10; Asts: Jevtović, Todorović 3	Arena: Hall Aleksandar Nikolić; Attendance: 5,000; Referees: Milivoje Jovčić, Marko Juras, Igor Mitrovski

19 December 2015 15	Partizan (Serbia)	78–85	(Serbia) Mega Leks	Belgrade
19:00	Scoring by quarter: 21-18, 21-11, 18-28, 18-28
	Pts: Jones 21; Rebs: Jones 15; Asts: Vitkovac 3		Pts: Nikolić 19; Rebs: three players 7 Asts: Ivanović 9	Arena: Hall Aleksandar Nikolić; Attendance: 5,500; Referees: Saša Maričić, Marko Juras, Aleksandar Milojević

23 December 2015 16	MZT Skopje (North Macedonia)	82–78	(Serbia) Partizan	Skopje
17:00	Scoring by quarter: 27-19, 14-21, 21-16, 20-22
	Pts: U. Luković 20; Rebs: U. Luković, Marko Ljubičić 8 Asts: M. Luković 6		Pts: Wilson 21; Rebs: Jones 6 Asts: Cvetković 4	Arena: Jane Sandanski Arena; Attendance: 4,000; Referees: Siniša Herceg, Mario Majkić, Milan Nedović

27 December 2015 17	Partizan (Serbia)	66–73	(Bosnia and Herzegovina) Igokea	Belgrade
17:00	Scoring by quarter: 22-11, 12-17, 14-22, 18-23
	Pts: Wilson 20; Rebs: Jones 12; Asts: Marinković, Vrabac 3		Pts: Radivojević 26; Rebs: Radivojević, Krstić 7 Asts: Radivojević 6	Arena: Hall Aleksandar Nikolić; Attendance: 2,500; Referees: Saša Pukl, Damir Javor, Alfred Jovović

4 January 2016 18	Sutjeska (Montenegro)	82–71	(Serbia) Partizan	Nikšić
21:00	Scoring by quarter: 18-10, 29-15, 18-19, 17-27
	Pts: Vranješ 27; Rebs: Vranješ 13; Asts: Korač, Pavić 4		Pts: Jones 20; Rebs: Jones 9 Asts: Cvetković 3	Arena: Nikšić Sports Center; Attendance: 4,500; Referees: Matej Boltauzer, Petar Obradović, Boris Krejić

10 January 2016 19	Partizan (Serbia)	85–82	(Croatia) Cibona	Belgrade
19:00	Scoring by quarter: 26-23, 22-19, 25-17, 12-23
	Pts: Vitkovac 15; Rebs: Vitkovac 12; Asts: Cvetković 6		Pts: Rozić 20; Rebs: Žižić 9 Asts: Joksimović 6	Arena: Hall Aleksandar Nikolić; Attendance: 6,000; Referees: Damir Javor, Haris Bijedić, Mario Majkić

16 January 2016 20	Krka (Slovenia)	70–75	(Serbia) Partizan	Novo Mesto
19:00	Scoring by quarter: 11-13, 16-23, 28-19, 15-20
	Pts: Kastrati 15; Rebs: Ivanov 13; Asts: Ivanov 3		Pts: Cvetković 21; Rebs: Vitkovac 8 Asts: Cvetković 7	Arena: Leon Štukelj Hall; Attendance: 1,000; Referees: Siniša Hercg, Tomislav Hordov, Tomislav Vovk

25 January 2016 21	Partizan (Serbia)	86–81	(Serbia) Crvena zvezda	Belgrade
21:00	Scoring by quarter: 23-21, 21-27, 23-18, 19-15
	Pts: Jones 17; Rebs: Murić 5 Asts: three players 3		Pts: Zirbes 26; Rebs: Zirbes 7 Asts: Jović 10	Arena: Hall Aleksandar Nikolić; Attendance: 5,000; Referees: Ilija Belošević, Srđan Dožai, Saša Maričić

30 January 2016 22	Budućnost (Montenegro)	78–65	(Serbia) Partizan	Podgorica
19:00	Scoring by quarter: 16-13, 22-19, 22-20, 18-13
	Pts: Marić, Jenkins 14; Rebs: Marić 6 Asts: Cook 7		Pts: Murić 17; Rebs: Jones 7 Asts: Wilson 6	Arena: Morača Sports Center; Attendance: 5,200; Referees: Siniša Hercg, Haris Bijedić, Josip Radojković

6 February 2016 23	Partizan (Serbia)	87–76	(Croatia) Zadar	Belgrade
21:00	Scoring by quarter: 25-18, 16-27, 23-13, 23-18
	Pts: Murić 20; Rebs: Murić, Jones 5 Asts: Wilson 4		Pts: Cosey 19; Rebs: Barać 7 Asts: Bašić 5	Arena: Hall Aleksandar Nikolić; Attendance: 6,000; Referees: Damir Javor, Sašo Petek, Boris Krejić

13 February 2016 24	Tajfun (Slovenia)	65–83	(Serbia) Partizan	Celje
17:00	Scoring by quarter: 25-19, 16-24, 11-26, 13-14
	Pts: Čebular 15; Rebs: Parker 5 Asts: four players 3		Pts: Murić 22; Rebs: Koprivica, Jones 6 Asts: Wilson 5	Arena: Golovec Hall; Attendance: 1,500; Referees: Petar Obradović, Tomislav Hordov, Josip Radojković

29 February 2016 25	Partizan (Serbia)	82–61	(Croatia) Cedevita	Belgrade
20:00	Scoring by quarter: 29-24, 19-10, 16-12, 18-15
	Pts: Jones 21; Rebs: Marinković 9 Asts: Wilson 5		Pts: Bilan 13; Rebs: Bilan 6 Asts: Gordić 4	Arena: Ranko Žeravica Sports Hall; Attendance: 4,500; Referees: Saša Pukl, Damir Javor, Igor Dragojević

7 March 2016 26	Union Olimpija (Slovenia)	118–115(OT)	(Serbia) Partizan	Ljubljana
18:00	Scoring by quarter: 20-13, 24-22, 14-19, 13-17, Overtime: 14-14, 9-9, 13-13, 11-8
	Pts: Lešić 31; Rebs: Lešić 21; Asts: Robinson 8		Pts: Wilson 41; Rebs: Jones 11; Asts: Cvetković 8	Arena: Tivoli Hall; Attendance: 3,200; Referees: Sreten Radović, Tomislav Hordov, Bojan Jovanić

== Kup Radivoja Koraća ==
Quarterfinals

18 February 2016	Partizan	85–83	FMP	Niš
21:00 CET	Scoring by quarter: 24–21, 25–19, 18–17, 18–26
	Pts: Jones 21; Rebs: Williams 9 Asts: Cvetković, Wilson 4		Pts: Dobrić 23; Rebs: Apić 9 Asts: Čović 3	Arena: Čair Sports Center; Attendance: 3,300; Referees: Glišić, Juras, Mrdak

Semifinals

20 February 2016	Partizan	68–60	Crvena zvezda	Niš
21:00 CET	Scoring by quarter: 17–13, 16–12, 19–14, 16–21
	Pts: Jones 19; Rebs: Jones 8 Asts: Cvetković 3		Pts: Kinsey 22; Rebs: Zirbes 12; Asts: Micić 5	Arena: Čair Sports Center; Attendance: 4,000; Referees: Belošević, Jovčić, Vojinović

Final

21 February 2016	Mega Leks	85–80	Partizan	Niš
21:00 CET	Scoring by quarter: 24–23, 22–25, 20–16, 19–16
	Pts: Ivanović 24; Rebs: Janković 7 Asts: Ivanović, Luwawu 5		Pts: Wilson 17; Rebs: Williams 12; Asts: Wilson 5	Arena: Čair Sports Center; Attendance: 4,000; Referees: Belošević, Jovčić, Obrknežević
