= Đumić =

Đumić (Serbian Cyrillic: Ђумић; also transliterated Djumić) is a Serbo-Croatian surname. Notable people with the surname include:

- Božo Đumić (born 1992), Serbian professional basketballer
- Dario Đumić (born 1992), Bosnian professional footballer
