= Miloš Glišić (basketball) =

Serbian basketball player

No. 6 – Borac Čačak
- Position: Power forward
- League: Basketball League of Serbia; Adriatic League

Personal information
- Born: 21 April 1998 (age 28) Banja Luka, Republika Srpska, Bosnia and Herzegovina
- Listed height: 2.07 m (6 ft 9 in)
- Listed weight: 98 kg (216 lb)

Career information
- NBA draft: 2020: undrafted
- Playing career: 2014–present

Career history
- 2014–2016: Partizan
- 2017–2018: Vršac
- 2018–2020: Dynamic BG
- 2020: Rogaška
- 2020–2021: Metalac
- 2021: Helios Suns
- 2021–2022: Dynamic BG
- 2022–present: Borac Čačak
Medals
Men's basketball
Representing Serbia
FIBA Europe Under-16 Championship
Bronze medal – third place	2012 Lithuania & Latvia	Team
Silver medal – second place	2013 Ukraine	Team

Miloš Glišić (Serbian Cyrillic: Милош Глишић; born 21 April 1998) is a Bosnia-born Serbian professional basketball player for Borac Čačak of the Basketball League of Serbia and the ABA League.

== Early career ==
Miloš Glišić was born in Banja Luka, Bosnia and Herzegovina. He started to play basketball for Ofy Basket Belgrade. In 2011, he joined the youth team of Partizan.

== Playing career ==
Glišić was added to the Partizan first team for their 2014–15 season. On 21 December 2014, he made a EuroCup debut with Partizan in a win against Asesoft Ploiești. He managed to score 2 points in that game. In 2016, he rejected to sign a professional contract with Partizan.

In April 2017, Glišić signed with for Vršac. In 2017–18 ABA Second League season, he averaged 11.5 points, 5.9 rebounds and 1.1 assists per game.

In April 2018, he joined Dynamic Belgrade. In September 2020, Glišić joined the Slovenian team Rogaška. He subsequently joined Metalac Valjevo where in four games he averaged 10.3 points, 7.0 rebounds, and 1.0 assist per game. On September 6, 2021, Glišić signed with Helios Suns of the Slovenian League.

On September 9, 2022, Glišić signed with Borac Čačak of the ABA League.

== National team career ==
Glišić was a member of the Serbian U-16 national teams that won the bronze medal at the 2012 FIBA Europe Under-16 Championship and the silver medal at 2013 FIBA Europe Under-16 Championship. In 2012, over two tournament games, he averaged 3.5 points and 1.5 rebounds. In 2013, over nine tournament games, he averaged 14.0 points, 7.6 rebounds and 0.9 assists per game. He was named to the All-Tournament Team at the 2013 Championship.

He was a member of the Serbian U-18 teams that participated at the 2015 FIBA Europe Under-18 Championship and the 2016 FIBA Europe Under-18 Championship. In 2015, over nine tournament games, he averaged 7.7 points, 4.7 rebounds and 0.9 assists per game. In 2016, over six tournament games, he averaged 7.6 points, 6.8 rebounds and 0.7 assists per game.

He was a member of the Serbia U19 team that participated at the 2015 FIBA Under-19 World Championship. Over seven tournament games, he averaged 8.7 points, 4.9 rebounds and 0.7 assists per game.

Glišić was a member of the Serbia U20 team that participated at the 2017 FIBA Europe Under-20 Championship. Over seven tournament games, he averaged 11.9 points, 5.4 rebounds and 0.9 assists per game.

== Career achievements and awards ==
- FIBA Europe Under-16 Championship All-Tournament Team – 2013
