= ABA League Players Union =

- ABA League Players Union – VOICE
- Унија играча АБА лиге – VOICE
- Official logo
- Formation: 2 July 2020; 6 years ago
- Founder: Rade Zagorac; Nenad Miljenović
- Registration no.: 28304781
- Headquarters: Belgrade, Serbia
- Location: Bulevar Mihaila Pupina 16a, Belgrade
- Region served: Bosnia and Herzegovina; Croatia; Montenegro; North Macedonia; Serbia; Slovenia
- Key people: Nenad Miljenović; Aleksandar Rašić

The ABA League Players Union – VOICE (Serbian: Унија играча АБА лиге – VOICE) is a nonprofit organization and trade union that represents ABA League basketball players.

== History ==
On 2 July 2020, Serbian basketball players Rade Zagorac and Nenad Miljenović established the Union in Belgrade, Serbia. In August 2020, the Union appointed Aleksandar Rašić as the general manager.

== Players ==
The following are lists of current players who play in the ABA League First Division and the ABA League Second Division:

- List of current ABA League First Division team rosters
- List of current ABA League Second Division team rosters

== See also ==
- Adriatic Basketball Association – ABA League
- National Basketball Players Association
