= Vanja Marinković =

Serbian basketball player (born 1997)

Vanja Marinković Вања Маринковић
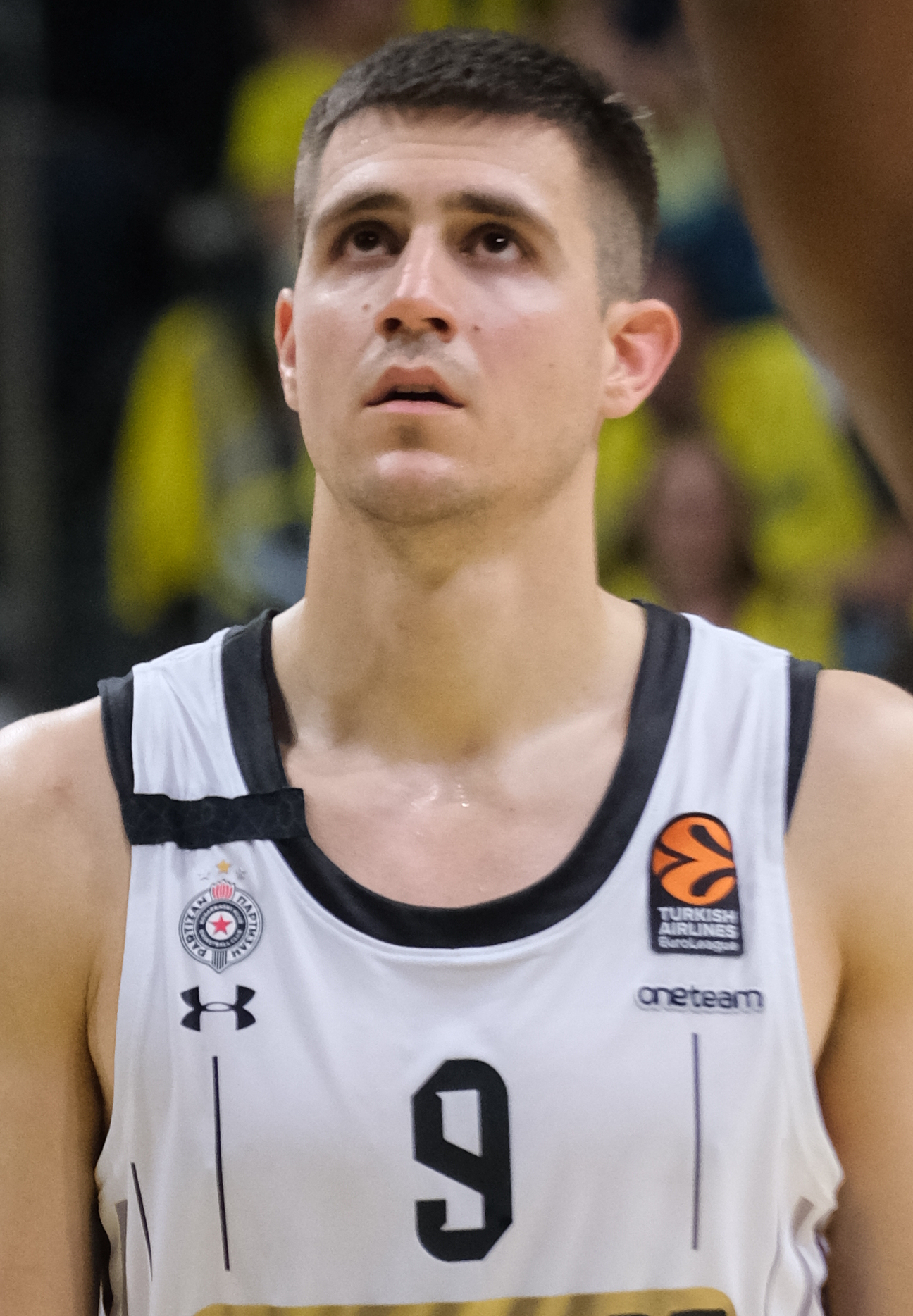
- Marinković with Partizan Belgrade in 2024

No. 9 – Partizan Belgrade
- Position: Small forward / shooting guard
- League: Serbian SuperLeague; ABA League; EuroLeague

Personal information
- Born: 9 January 1997 (age 29) Belgrade, Serbia, FR Yugoslavia
- Listed height: 1.99 m (6 ft 6 in)
- Listed weight: 86 kg (190 lb)

Career information
- NBA draft: 2019: 2nd round, 60th overall pick
- Drafted by: Sacramento Kings
- Playing career: 2013–present

Career history
- 2013–2019: Partizan
- 2019–2021: Valencia
- 2021–2024: Baskonia
- 2024–present: Partizan

Career highlights
- ABA League champion (2025); 2× Serbian League champion (2014, 2025); 2× Serbian Cup winner (2018, 2019)
- Stats at Basketball Reference
Medals
Men's basketball
Representing Serbia
Olympic Games
Bronze medal – third place	2024 Paris	Team
FIBA World Cup
Silver medal – second place	2023 Philippines–Japan–Indonesia
U17 World Championship
Bronze medal – third place	2014 UAE	Team
U18 European Championship
Silver medal – second place	2014 Turkey	Team
U16 European Championship
Silver medal – second place	2013 Ukraine	Team

Vanja Marinković (Serbian: Вања Маринковић, born 9 January 1997) is a Serbian professional basketball player and the team captain for Partizan Belgrade of the Serbian SuperLeague, the ABA League, and the EuroLeague. Standing at 1.99 m (6 ft 6 1/2 in), he plays at the shooting guard and small forward positions.

== Early life ==
Marinković was born in Belgrade, FR Yugoslavia. He comes from a relatively sports-related family; his father Zoran is a football referee and cinematographer, while his mother Dragana and his six-year older brother both played basketball in their youth. Marinković started playing basketball for Belgrade-based club Vračar where he played from 2006 until 2010. He then moved to Koledž where he stayed for one season.

== Club career ==
=== Partizan (2013–2019) ===
In the summer of 2011, he moved to play with Partizan's youth categories. He continued to play with the youth categories of the team for four seasons, with the exception of the last season in which he played occasionally, as he spent most of his time training with the senior team.

In the 2013–14 season, he started working with the senior team of Partizan, under head coach Duško Vujošević. He debuted for the team in the Serbian Cup game against FMP Belgrade. However, although being capped for the games many times, he occasionally got the chance to play in the rest of the season. Partizan finished the season winning its 13th consecutive domestic league title, defeating archrivals Crvena zvezda by 3–1 in the final series; that would be the only title won over the season. He also became a champion with Partizan's junior team by beating Crvena zvezda in the final game.

In the 2014–15 season, he became a standard part of senior team's rotation. On 8 November, he led his team with season-high 20 points in 65–50 win over MZT Skopje, showing great potential for the future. Three days after turning 18, on 12 January 2015, he signed his first professional, four-year contract with Partizan. Over the season, he appeared in 29 games of the ABA League, averaging 3.9 points, 1.2 rebounds and 0.7 assists per game. He also played in the EuroCup where Partizan was eliminated in the Group E. On 18 September 2015, he appeared in the EuroBasket 2015 special event – FIBA European U-18 All-Star game, consisted of the 24 most talented European players born in 1997 or after. He led his Team Black with 17 points and 4 assists in 82–87 loss to Team Red. Over 26 games of the 2015–16 ABA League, he averaged 6.1 points, 2.6 rebounds and 1.2 assists per game, while shooting 31.3% from the field.

In the 2016–17 season, he averaged 8.2 points, 2.7 rebounds and 1.5 assists per game, while shooting 42.5% from the field over 23 games of the 2016–17 ABA League.

On 14 October 2017, in an ABA League away game versus Zadar in a 104–97, Marinković scored a career-high 33 points, also adding 5 rebounds and 1 assist. Over 20 games of the 2017–18 ABA League, he averaged 11.3 points, 2.9 rebounds and 1.2 assists per game, while shooting 41.3% from the field and 36.1% from the three-point field goal.

In June 2018, he signed a two-year contract extension with the club. Over 23 games of the 2018–19 ABA League, he averaged 12.2 points, 2.4 rebounds and 1.8 assists per game, while shooting 40.2% from the field and 32.8% from the three-point field goal.

=== Valencia (2019–2021) ===
On 23 July 2019, Marinković signed a two-year contract with the Spanish club Valencia. He left Valencia in June 2021.

=== Saski Baskonia (2021–2024) ===
On 7 July 2021, Marinković signed with Saski Baskonia of the Liga ACB.

=== Return to Partizan (2024–present) ===
On 17 June 2024, Marinković signed with Partizan Mozzart Bet of the Basketball League of Serbia for a second stint. In his comeback season with Partizan, Marinković as team captain averaged 7.3 points and 1.6 rebounds over 21 EuroLeague games, while shooting career-high 46.3% from the field. During the 2024–25 season, Partizan managed to lift the record eighth ABA League championship, and the Serbian League championship, the first one after 11 seasons.

In July 2026, he inked a two-year contract extension with the team.

=== NBA draft rights ===
On 20 June 2019, Marinković was the final pick of the 2019 NBA draft, after being selected by the Sacramento Kings. On 10 February 2022, Marinković's draft rights were traded to the Los Angeles Clippers as a part of a four-team trade. On 8 July 2023, his player rights were then traded to the Memphis Grizzlies as a part of a five-team trade. On 8 February 2024, his rights were traded to the Brooklyn Nets as a part of a three-team trade with the Phoenix Suns. On 4 February 2026, his rights were traded to the Los Angeles Clippers as part of a three-team trade involving the Toronto Raptors.

== National team career ==
Marinković represented the Serbia men's national under-16 basketball team at the 2013 FIBA Europe Under-16 Championship where they won the silver medal. The following year he was part of the U17 national team that won the bronze medal at the 2014 FIBA Under-17 World Championship. He won the bronze medal at the 2024 Summer Olympics with Serbia.

== Career statistics ==
Legend
GP	Games played	GS	Games started	MPG	Minutes per game
FG%	Field-goal percentage	3P%	3-point field-goal percentage	FT%	Free-throw percentage
RPG	Rebounds per game	APG	Assists per game	SPG	Steals per game
BPG	Blocks per game	PPG	Points per game	PIR	Performance index rating
**Bold**	Career high

=== EuroLeague ===
Year	Team	GP	GS	MPG	FG%	3P%	FT%	RPG	APG	SPG	BPG	PPG	PIR
2019–20	Valencia	27	11	14.9	.437	.329	.833	1.0	.4	.4	—	6.3	3.9
2020–21	Valencia	15	8	14.5	.391	.362	.857	1.3	.6	.2	—	6.3	2.9
2021–22	Baskonia	26	5	13.3	.344	.329	**1.000**	.9	.6	.2	—	3.4	1.7
2022–23	Baskonia	34	16	19.9	.440	**.403**	.810	1.6	1.1	**.5**	.0	9.1	6.4
2023–24	Baskonia	**37**	**28**	**25.8**	.429	.384	.806	**2.5**	**1.5**	.3	.0	**11.0**	**8.7**
2024–25	Partizan	21	13	22.9	**.463**	.392	.650	1.6	1.2	.6	**.1**	7.3	5.2
Career		160	81	19.3	.425	.375	.799	1.6	1.0	.4	.0	7.6	5.2

=== EuroCup ===
Year	Team	GP	GS	MPG	FG%	3P%	FT%	RPG	APG	SPG	BPG	PPG	PIR
2014–15	Partizan	10	4	14.7	.345	.357	.714	1.9	.5	**.4**	—	5.5	2.9
2017–18	Partizan	8	8	28.5	**.486**	**.400**	**.923**	**3.6**	1.4	.3	**.6**	**12.5**	**9.6**
2018–19	Partizan	**16**	**15**	**29.1**	.395	.356	.727	2.3	**2.3**	**.4**	.1	12.4	8.0
Career		34	27	24.7	.408	.368	.766	2.5	1.6	.4	.2	10.4	6.9

=== Basketball Champions League ===
Year	Team	GP	GS	MPG	FG%	3P%	FT%	RPG	APG	SPG	BPG	PPG
2016–17	Partizan	12	1	22.2	.465	.457	.833	2.3	.8	.2	.2	7.7
Career		12	1	22.2	.465	.457	.833	2.3	.8	.2	.2	7.7

=== Domestic leagues ===
Year	Team	League	GP	MPG	FG%	3P%	FT%	RPG	APG	SPG	BPG	PPG
2013–14	(Serbia) Partizan	KLS	2	2.0	.000	.000	—	—	—	—	—	0.0
2014–15	(Serbia) Partizan	KLS	19	18.2	.398	.279	.722	1.9	1.0	.4	.3	6.4
2014–15	(Serbia) Partizan	ABA	29	13.1	.376	.385	.632	1.2	.7	.2	.1	3.4
2015–16	(Serbia) Partizan	KLS	12	20.2	.368	.333	.833	2.3	1.2	.6	.2	4.9
2015–16	(Serbia) Partizan	ABA	26	21.8	.313	.255	.800	2.5	1.2	.5	.2	6.1
2016–17	(Serbia) Partizan	KLS	16	25.4	.454	.394	.750	3.7	1.3	.4	.3	9.2
2016–17	(Serbia) Partizan	ABA	23	26.7	.425	.414	.806	2.7	1.5	.6	.2	8.2
2017–18	(Serbia) Partizan	KLS	13	23.6	.545	.346	.861	1.8	2.3	.8	.1	13.0
2017–18	(Serbia) Partizan	ABA	20	28.4	.413	.361	.714	2.8	1.2	.7	.2	11.2
2018–19	(Serbia) Partizan	KLS	16	21.6	.500	.328	.738	2.3	1.6	.3	.1	10.0
2018–19	(Serbia) Partizan	ABA	23	28.1	.402	.328	.750	2.3	1.8	.6	.1	12.2
2019–20	(Spain) Valencia	ACB	22	12.8	.431	.362	.889	.9	.4	.5	.0	5.9
2020–21	(Spain) Valencia	ACB	11	17.7	.410	.469	.750	.8	.6	.5	.1	8.4
2021–22	(Spain) Baskonia	ACB	36	14.0	.404	.346	.833	1.3	.5	.4	.0	5.1
2022–23	(Spain) Baskonia	ACB	30	19.0	.403	.364	.760	1.5	1.1	.8	.1	9.3
2023–24	(Spain) Baskonia	ACB	33	24.1	.458	.387	.809	1.8	1.1	.4	.1	11.5

== See also ==
- List of NBA drafted players from Serbia
- Sacramento Kings draft history
