= Miloš Janković =

Serbian basketball player

Caja 1987
- Position: Center / power forward
- League: Segunda FEB

Personal information
- Born: June 28, 1994 (age 32) Čačak, FR Yugoslavia
- Listed height: 2.06 m (6 ft 9 in)
- Listed weight: 97 kg (214 lb)

Career information
- NBA draft: 2016: undrafted
- Playing career: 2010–present

Career history
- 2010–2013: Mladost Čačak
- 2013–2014: Radnički Kragujevac
- 2014–2015: Varda HE Višegrad
- 2015–2016: Metalac Valjevo
- 2016: SAM Massagno
- 2016–2017: Metalac Valjevo
- 2017–2018: SAM Massagno
- 2018–2019: Dynamic Belgrade
- 2019–2020: Monthey
- 2021–2023: Fribourg Olympic
- 2023-2024: Castelló
- 2024: SPD Radnički
- 2025: UDEA Baloncesto
- 2025–present: Caja 1987 Baloncesto
Medals
Representing Serbia
Men's basketball
U19 World Championship
Silver medal – second place	2013 Czech Republic	U-19 Team
U18 European Championship
Bronze medal – third place	2012 Lithuania/Latvia	U-18 Team
Men's basketball 3x3
U18 World Championships
Gold medal – first place	2012 Spain	National Team

Miloš Janković (Serbian Cyrillic: Милош Јанковић, born 28 June 1994) is a Serbian professional basketball player.

== Professional career ==
He signed with Metalac Farmakom from Varda HE Višegrad on 24 March 2015. He spent the 2013–14 season in the ABA League playing for Radnički Kragujevac.

On July 7, 2017, he signed with SAM Massagno.

== 3x3 basketball ==
Janković won gold medal at the 2012 FIBA 3x3 Under-18 World Championships representing Serbia national 3x3 under-18 team together with Luka Anđušić, Mihajlo Andrić, and Rade Zagorac.
