= Chris Cooper (basketball) =

American basketball player (born 1990)

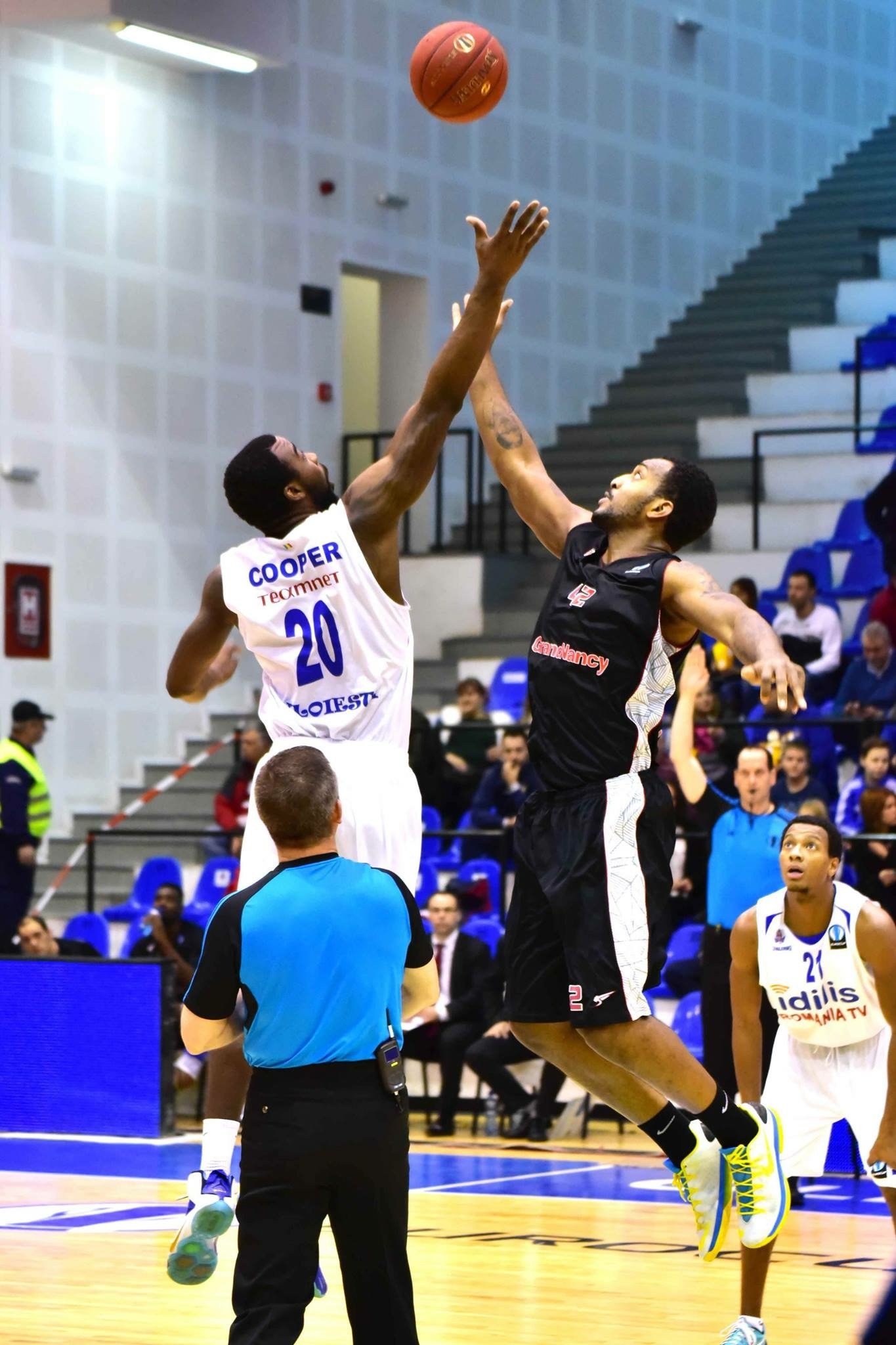
- Cooper (left) during a tip-off

Personal information
- Born: January 17, 1990 (age 36) Dumfries, Virginia, U.S.
- Listed height: 6 ft 9 in (2.06 m)
- Listed weight: 243 lb (110 kg)

Career information
- High school: Forest Park (Woodbridge, Virginia)
- College: Old Dominion (2008–2012)
- NBA draft: 2012: undrafted
- Playing career: 2012–present
- Position: Power forward / center

Career history
- 2012–2013: Bakersfield Jam
- 2013–2014: Šiauliai
- 2014–2015: Ploiești
- 2015–2016: Steaua București
- 2016–2021: Sibiu
- 2021–2024: Memphis Lions

Chris Cooper (born January 17, 1990) is an American professional basketball player. He played college basketball for Old Dominion University.

== High school career ==
Cooper attended Forest Park High School in Woodbridge, Virginia. He averaged 9.4 points, 8.5 rebounds and 3.4 blocked shots. He was a 2007 Sporting News honorable mention preseason All-American. As a member of the Hoopbooth National AAU squad, he averaged 16.2 points and 12.3 rebounds per game.

== College career ==
Born in Bronx, New York, but raised in Dumfries, Virginia, Cooper played for Old Dominion University's basketball team in NCAA Division I from 2008 until 2012. He saw little playing time during his freshman and sophomore years.

=== 2008–2009 season ===
In his freshmen year at Old Dominion University he played in 24 games and scored 4 points vs. Winston-Salem, Northeastern and Belmont and had 5 rebounds vs. Winston-Salem. Cooper averaged 1.0 points, 0.8 rebounds, and 0.3 assists.

=== 2009–2010 season ===
During his sophomore year he played in 29 games and scored 8 points vs. Bethune-Cookman and Liberty. 5 rebounds vs. Liberty, Mt. St. Mary's, Drexel. 3 blocked shots vs. Bethune-Cookman. Ending the season Cooper averaged 1.4 points, 2.0 rebounds, and 0.2 assists. in 6.5 minutes.

=== 2010–2011 season ===
In his junior season, Cooper had an increased role and started 24 games with a career high 16 rebounds vs. UMES and ties the ODU Constant Center mark which he shares with Alex Loughton ('06). Scored 9 points vs. Missouri. Scored a career high 12 points at George Mason. Dished out 4 assists vs. W&M. Cooper averaged 5.0 points, 5.5 rebounds, and 0.6 assists in 20.9 minutes.

=== 2011–2012 season ===
Cooper became a dominant force in the paint during his senior year, averaging a double–double in 29 minutes of game action. Second Team All-CAA selection. Career high 22 rebounds vs. JMU. Career high 21 points at Richmond. 17 points vs. No. 2 Kentucky. 16 rebounds at JMU. 12 rebounds vs. Kentucky. Named CAA Player of the Week on Nov. 21. 17 double-doubles and 21 games with 10 or more rebounds. Currently tied for fifth all-time for single season double-double bests at ODU. Second team NABC All-District 10. Ranked 20th nationally in rebounding and 13th in double-doubles. Cooper went undrafted at the 2012 NBA draft. In his senior year at ODU, Cooper averaged 10.8 ppg and 10.1 rpg in 32 games. He was named to the NABC Division I District 10 2nd Team in 2012.

== Professional career ==
=== 2012–2013 season ===
In November 2012, Cooper was selected 31st overall in the 2012 NBA Development League Draft by the Bakersfield Jam. During the season, he averaged 3.9 points per game and 5.8 rebounds per game in 47 games. He helped the team win the D-League Western Conference Championship in 2013

=== 2013–2014 season ===
In July 2013, he signed a one-year deal with a second year option, with BC Šiauliai of Lithuania, where he helped lead his team to his first professional national championship title. It was his first stint outside the United States. During the season he averaged 7 points and 5 rebounds in LKL and 8.8 points and 5.9 rebounds in Baltic League in 36 games.

=== 2014–2015 season ===
In July 2014, he signed a one-year deal with CSU Asesoft Ploiești of Romania, also helping his team reach an 11th national championship title (two (2) overall in his professional career). Cooper's last Basketball came at the end of the 2013/2014 campaign when he played for BC Siauliai in the Lithuanian LKL. The forward wore the colors of Siauliai throughout the season in both the LKL and the Baltic league. In 36 league games he logged numbers of 7.0 points and 5.0 rebounds per game, while in Eighteen Baltic League appearances he averaged 8.8 points and 5.9 rebounds per game. This season will be the second that Chris Cooper has spent in Europe as he played his rookie campaign (2012/2013) in the USA. He represented the Bakersfield Jam over 46 games and notched figures of 3.9 points and 5.6 boards per game.

=== 2015–2016 season ===
In July 2015, Cooper signed a one-year contract with CSA Steaua București (Basketball) of the Romanian League. At the end of the season, Cooper helped his team reach the playoffs and finishing third overall in the Romanian League.

=== 2016–2017 season ===
In August 2016, Cooper signed a one-year contract CSU Sibiu of the Romanian League. Cooper helped them to end the regular season as a second best team in the league having advanced to the semifinals. Of particular note was the Finals Game 1: CSU Sibiu vs Oradea in which he helped to win the game recording a double-double by scoring 16 points and 18 rebounds. Cooper also lead the league in rebounds with 7.9 total rebounds averaged per game.

=== 2017–2018 season ===
Cooper re-signs with CSU Sibiu for the 2017–2018 season. The 27-year-old played in Sibiu last season and in 40 Liga Nationala games he averaged 9.4 points, 7.9 rebounds, and 1.2 assists.

== International Regular Season Stats – Per Game ==
Season	Team	League	GP	GS	MIN	FGM	FGA	FG%	3PM	3PA	3P%	FTM	FTA	FT%	OFF	DEF	TRB	AST	STL	BLK	PF	TOV	PTS
2013–14 *	All Teams	All Leagues	54	42	17.9	3.19	6.11	.521	0.00	0.00	.000	1.26	2.02	.624	2.26	3.07	5.33	0.76	0.56	0.70	2.70	1.31	7.63
2013–14 *	Siauliai	LKL	36	27	17.5	2.97	5.89	.505	0.00	0.00	.000	1.08	1.58	.684	2.28	2.75	5.03	0.86	0.56	0.58	2.78	1.19	7.03
2013–14 *	Siauliai	BBL	18	15	18.7	3.61	6.56	.551	0.00	0.00	.000	1.61	2.89	.558	2.22	3.72	5.94	0.56	0.56	0.94	2.56	1.56	8.83
2014–15 *	All Teams	All Leagues	39	15	16.5	2.44	4.90	.497	0.03	0.08	.333	1.13	2.03	.557	2.05	3.18	5.23	0.64	0.21	1.05	2.21	0.69	6.03
2014–15 *	CSU Asesoft Ploiesti	Divizia A	23	12	18.9	3.13	5.52	.567	0.04	0.04	1.000	1.61	2.83	.569	2.39	3.52	5.91	0.78	0.17	1.22	2.61	1.00	7.91
2014–15 *	CSU Asesoft Ploiesti	Eurocup	16	3	13.2	1.44	4.00	.359	0.00	0.12	.000	0.44	0.88	.500	1.56	2.69	4.25	0.44	0.25	0.81	1.62	0.25	3.31
2015–16 *	All Teams	All Leagues	47	32	19.9	2.55	5.47	.467	0.04	0.04	1.000	1.11	2.32	.477	2.81	3.34	6.15	1.04	0.57	0.81	3.15	1.51	6.26
2015–16 *	Steaua CSM EximBank Bucuresti	Divizia A	37	27	20.4	2.54	5.32	.477	0.05	0.05	1.000	1.08	2.30	.471	2.89	3.32	6.22	1.08	0.62	0.81	3.03	1.46	6.22
2015–16 *	Steaua CSM EximBank Bucuresti	Eurocup	10	5	18.1	2.60	6.00	.433	0.00	0.00	.000	1.20	2.40	.500	2.50	3.40	5.90	0.90	0.40	0.80	3.60	1.70	6.40
2016–17	CSU Atlassib Sibiu	Divizia A	41	31	25.6	3.73	8.00	.466	0.41	1.76	.236	1.56	3.12	.500	2.80	5.10	7.90	1.22	0.51	1.07	3.34	2.05	9.44
