= Rade Zagorac =

Serbian basketball player

Free Agent
- Position: Small forward / power forward

Personal information
- Born: 12 August 1995 (age 31) Belgrade, Serbia, FR Yugoslavia
- Listed height: 2.05 m (6 ft 9 in)
- Listed weight: 100 kg (220 lb)

Career information
- NBA draft: 2016: 2nd round, 35th overall pick
- Drafted by: Boston Celtics
- Playing career: 2012–present

Career history
- 2012–2017: Mega Basket
- 2013–2014: →Smederevo 1953
- 2017–2018: Real Betis
- 2018–2022: Partizan
- 2022–2023: Avtodor Saratov
- 2023–2024: Samara
- 2024–2025: Büyükçekmece
- 2025–2026: Kaohsiung Aquas

Career highlights
- 3× Serbian Cup winner (2016, 2019, 2020); ABA League Supercup winner (2019)
- Stats at Basketball Reference
Medals
Representing Serbia
Men's basketball
U-20 European Championship
| Gold medal – first place | 2015 Italy | Team |
Men's basketball 3x3
U-18 World Championships
| Gold medal – first place | 2012 Spain | National Team |

Rade Zagorac (Serbian Cyrillic: Раде Загорац; born 12 August 1995) is a Serbian professional basketball player who last played for the Kaohsiung Aquas of the Taiwan Professional Basketball League (TPBL). Standing at 6 ft 9 in (2.06 m), he plays at the small forward and power forward positions.

== Professional career ==
Zagorac began his professional career with Mega Vizura starting with 2012–13 season. He spent the 2013–14 season on loan to Smederevo 1953. He returned to Mega for the 2014–15 season. On 1 October 2015, in the Round 1 game of the Adriatic League against Crvena zvezda, he broke his left arm. He returned to the court on 17 January in a game against Tajfun. Until the end of the season he played a total of 13 Adriatic League games, averaging 13.1 points, 5.9 rebounds and 2.4 assists per game. Mega Leks made it to the Finals where it lost to Crvena zvezda. In April 2015, Zagorac declared himself eligible for the 2015 NBA draft, only to withdraw later. On 2 July 2016, Zagorac signed a new two-year contract with Mega Leks. Over 26 games in the 2016–17 ABA League season, he averaged 15 points, 6.5 rebounds and 2.5 assists per game.

On 23 June 2016, Zagorac was selected with the 35th overall pick in the NBA draft by the Boston Celtics. His draft rights were later traded to the Memphis Grizzlies, for a future first-round pick. He played for Grizzlies during the 2017 NBA Summer League. On 17 July 2017, he signed with the Grizzlies. On 16 October, Grizzlies waived him prior the start of the 2017–18 season.

On 28 November 2017, Zagorac signed with Spanish club Real Betis Energía Plus until the end of the 2018–19 season. On 29 June 2018, Real Betis Energía Plus parted ways with Zagorac.

On 30 June 2018, Zagorac signed a two-year deal with Partizan. He left Partizan in July 2022.

On 24 September 2022, Zagorac signed a one-year contract with Russian club Avtodor Saratov of the VTB United League. On 17 June 2023, he signed with BC Samara for the 2023–24 season.

On November 28, 2024, he signed with ONVO Büyükçekmece of the Basketbol Süper Ligi (BSL).

On December 17, 2025, Zagorac signed with the Kaohsiung Aquas of the Taiwan Professional Basketball League (TPBL).

On July 26, 2026, the Kaohsiung Aquas announced that Zagorac left the team.

== 3x3 basketball career ==
Zagorac won the gold medal at the 2012 FIBA 3x3 Under-18 World Championships representing Serbia national 3x3 under-18 team together with Luka Anđušić, Miloš Janković, and Mihajlo Andrić.

== Off the court ==
Zagorac and Nenad Miljenović established the ABA League Players Union in July 2020. The Union is a non-profit organization and trade union based in Belgrade, Serbia, that represents ABA League players.

== See also ==
- List of NBA drafted players from Serbia
- Boston Celtics draft history
