= Nikola Jevtović =

Serbian basketball player

No. 14 – Rapid București
- Position: Power forward
- League: Liga Națională

Personal information
- Born: December 19, 1989 (age 36) Užice, SR Serbia, SFR Yugoslavia
- Listed height: 2.09 m (6 ft 10 in)
- Listed weight: 103 kg (227 lb)

Career information
- NBA draft: 2011: undrafted
- Playing career: 2010–present

Career history
- 2010–2013: Sloboda Užice
- 2013–2014: Radnički Kragujevac
- 2014–2016: Metalac Farmakom
- 2016–2017: Steaua București
- 2017–2018: Igokea
- 2018–2019: Atomerőmű SE
- 2019–2020: BM Slam Ostrów Wielkopolski
- 2020–2024 Pitești: BCM U Pitești

Career highlights
- Bosnian Cup winner (2018)

Nikola Jevtović (Serbian Cyrillic: Никола Јевтовић, born 19 December 1989) is a Serbian professional basketball player for BCM U Pitești of the Liga Națională. Before he joined Piteşti, he had played for BM Slam Ostrów Wielkopolski of the PLK.2020-2024 Pitești 2024-2025 Brașov 2025-2027 Rapid Bucharest
