= Nenad Miljenović =

Serbian basketball player (born 1993)

Denver Nuggets
- Position: Assistant general manager
- League: NBA

Personal information
- Born: April 8, 1993 (age 33) Belgrade, Serbia, FR Yugoslavia
- Listed height: 6 ft 4.5 in (1.94 m)
- Listed weight: 210 lb (95 kg)

Career information
- NBA draft: 2015: undrafted
- Playing career: 2011–2023

Career history
- 2011–2012: Partizan
- 2011–2012: → Mega Basket
- 2012–2013: Radnički Kragujevac
- 2013–2015: Mega Basket
- 2015–2016: Sevilla
- 2016–2017: PAOK
- 2018–2019: OKK Beograd
- 2019: Petrol Olimpija
- 2019: Mega Basket
- 2019–2020: OKK Beograd
- 2020–2021: San-en NeoPhoenix
- 2021–2022: Dinamo București
- 2022–2023: OKK Beograd
Medals
Men's basketball
Representing Serbia
U18 European Championship
Silver medal – second place	2011 Poland	Team
U16 European Championship
Bronze medal – third place	2009 Lithuania	Team

Nenad Miljenović (Serbian Cyrillic: Ненад Миљеновић; born April 8, 1993) is a Serbian former professional basketball player and basketball executive, currently with the Denver Nuggets of the National Basketball Association (NBA). Standing at 1.94 m (6 ft 4 1/2 in), he used to play at the point guard position.

== Professional career ==
Miljenović started playing basketball with the youth ranks of FMP. In October 2011, Miljenović signed his first professional contract with Partizan Belgrade. In December 2011, he was loaned to Mega Vizura. On September 25, 2012, he signed a termination of his contract with Partizan.

Only one day after his contract termination with Partizan, Miljenović signed a four-year contract with Serbian team Radnički Kragujevac, on September 26, 2012.

On July 23, 2013, Miljenović signed a one-year deal with his former team, Mega Vizura.

In June 2014, he extended his contract with Mega Vizura. With the departure of Vasilije Micić from the team, his role in the team increased during the 2014–15 season. In the first game of the 2014–15 ABA League season for his team, he scored 26 points, and added 10 assists, to help his team defeat MZT Skopje, by a score of 103–98. He has been named the ABA League Player of the Month for October of the 2014–15 ABA League season. Over 24 games played during the 2014–15 Adriatic League season, he averaged 13.3 points, 4.6 rebounds, and a league leading 8.4 assists per game. During the same season he was named MVP of the Round five times, was the assists leader of the season and was a very close second player in MVP standings behind his teammate Nikola Jokić.

On August 19, 2015, he signed a three-year contract with the Spanish team Sevilla. After one season with Sevilla in the Spanish Liga ACB, he parted ways with the club.

On July 5, 2016, Miljenović signed with the Greek club PAOK of the Greek Basket League.

On February 1, 2019, Miljenović joined the ABA League team Olimpija. He averaged 15 points and 7 assists per game.

In August 2020, he signed with San-en NeoPhoenix of the Japanese B.League.

== National team career ==
Miljenović was a member of the junior national teams of Serbia. With Serbia's junior national teams, he played at the following tournaments: the 2009 FIBA Europe Under-16 Championship, where he won a bronze medal, the 2010 FIBA Under-17 World Championship, the 2011 FIBA Europe Under-18 Championship, where he won a silver medal, the 2012 FIBA Europe Under-20 Championship, and the 2013 FIBA Europe Under-20 Championship.

== Off the court ==
Miljenović and Rade Zagorac established the ABA League Players Union in July 2020. The Union is a non-profit organization and trade union based in Belgrade, Serbia, that represents ABA League players.

On 21 February 2025, the Denver Nuggets hired Miljenović as part of their front office in the assistant general manager role.
