= Nikola Malešević =

Serbian basketball player

Personal information
- Born: 25 August 1989 (age 37) Titovo Užice, SR Serbia, SFR Yugoslavia
- Listed height: 2.02 m (6 ft 8 in)
- Listed weight: 91 kg (201 lb)

Career information
- College: Rhode Island (2009–2013)
- Playing career: 2008–present
- Position: Small forward

Career history
- 2008–2009, 2013: Sloboda Užice
- 2013–2014: Śląsk Wrocław
- 2014: Mladost Mrkonjić Grad
- 2014–2015: Metalac Farmakom
- 2015–2017: Steaua București
- 2017–2018: Sloboda Užice
- 2018–2019: AZS Koszalin
- 2019–2020: OKK Beograd
- 2020: CSO Voluntari
- 2020: Zlatibor
- 2020–2022: Pelister
- 2022: Cibona
- 2022–2023: Rabotnički
- 2023–2024: Iraklis
- 2024–2025: Sloboda Užice
- 2025–2026: Pelister

Nikola Malešević (Serbian Cyrillic: Никола Малешевић, born 25 August 1989) is a Serbian professional basketball player.

== Personal life ==
He is the brother of Serbian volleyball player Tijana Malešević.
