= Petar Aranitović =

Serbian basketball player

Cibona
- Position: Point guard / shooting guard
- League: Croatian League; ABA League

Personal information
- Born: September 21, 1994 (age 32) Belgrade, Serbia, FR Yugoslavia
- Listed height: 1.94 m (6 ft 4 in)
- Listed weight: 75 kg (165 lb)

Career information
- NBA draft: 2016: undrafted
- Playing career: 2013–present

Career history
- 2013–2016: Partizan
- 2016–2017: ICL Manresa
- 2017–2018: Mega Bemax
- 2018: Lovćen
- 2019–2020: Palencia Baloncesto
- 2020–2021: Batumi
- 2021–2022: Itzehoe
- 2023: Almansa
- 2023–2024: Fuenlabrada
- 2024–2025: Gipuzkoa
- 2025–present: Cibona

Career highlights
- Serbian League champion (2014)
Medals
Men's basketball
Representing Serbia
U20 European Championship
Bronze medal – third place	2014 Greece	U20 National Team

Petar Aranitović (Cyrillic: Петар Аранитовић; born September 20, 1994) is a Serbian professional basketball player currently playing for Cibona in the Croatian League and ABA League.

== Professional career ==
=== Partizan ===
Aranitović debuted in the Euroleague on 5 December 2013, against Budivelnyk and scored 2 points for almost a minute on court. In Partizan did not immediately get a chance in the first team, but he successfully played for the junior team of Partizan. In his first season as a professional player, he won the Basketball League of Serbia with Partizan defeating Crvena zvezda with 3-1 in the final series. The first serious chance in the senior team got to the final tournament of the Radivoj Korać Cup on 7 February 2014. In the defeat of his team of FMP, Petar Aranitović has provided an excellent game where he scored 20 points and was the most efficient player of Partizan in that game. Yet after that, he was not given a real chance. The following season he was regular member of the first team but the coach Duško Vujošević put into play only in the first round against Szolnoki Olaj when he has scored 2 points.

Yet early next 2015/16. season gets significantly more space in the game. During the preparatory period had a remarkable effect, and already in the first match against Igokea where he got more space scored 24 points with 5 affected triplets. On 13 September 2015, Aranitović has scored 26 points against FMP on the preparation match in 94-86 win for Partizan.

=== Manresa ===
On July 23, 2016, Aranitović signed a three-year contract with Spanish club ICL Manresa.

== Personal ==
Petar has a younger brother Aleksandar Aranitović who is also a basketball player.
