= Marin Rozić =

Croatian basketball player (born 1983)

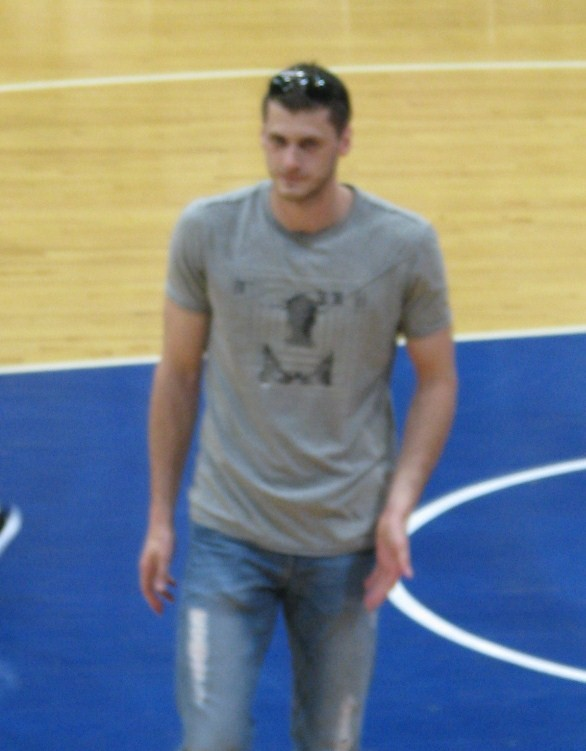
- Rozić in 2010

Cibona
- Title: Sports director
- League: HT Premijer liga ABA League

Personal information
- Born: 14 February 1983 (age 43) Mostar, Bosnia and Herzegovina, Yugoslavia
- Listed height: 2.01 m (6 ft 7 in)
- Listed weight: 100 kg (220 lb)

Career information
- NBA draft: 2005: undrafted
- Playing career: 2000–2020
- Position: Small forward
- Number: 20

Career history
- 2000–2003: Zrinjevac
- 2003–2004: Livorno
- 2004–2020: Cibona

Career highlights
- ABA League champion (2014); 7× Croatian League champion (2006, 2007, 2009, 2010, 2012, 2013, 2019); 2× Croatian Cup winner (2009, 2013); No. 20 retired by Cibona Zagreb
Medals
Men's basketball
Representing Croatia
European U-18 Championship
Silver medal – second place	2000 Croatia	U-18 Team

Marin Rozić (born 14 February 1983) is a Croatian retired basketball player. Standing at 6 ft 8 in (2.03 m) in height and 220 pounds (100 kg) in weight, he played at the small forward position.

He spent most of his career with Cibona, playing 16 seasons with the club, retiring in 2020.

== National career ==
He was a member of the Croatia national team for many years.

He was a part of the national team at Eurobasket 2007 and Eurobasket 2009.

On 15 November 2018, head coach Dražen Anzulović invited him to the national team after 9 years, for the qualifications for the 2019 World Cup.
