= Andreja Milutinović =

Serbian basketball player

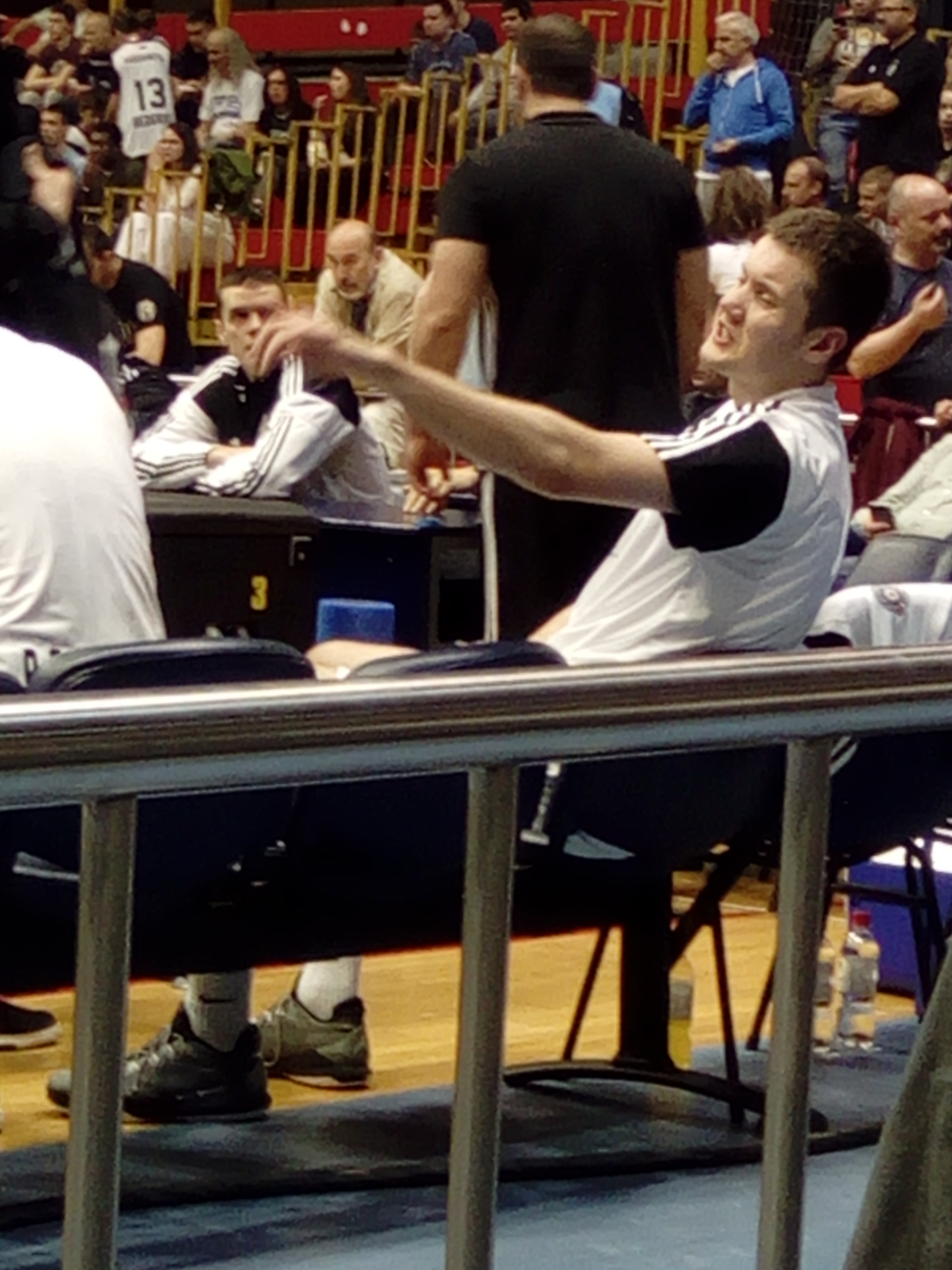
- Milutinović with Partizan in May 2016.

Free agent
- Position: Small forward / shooting guard

Personal information
- Born: 6 August 1990 (age 36) Kragujevac, SR Serbia, SFR Yugoslavia
- Listed height: 6 ft 6 in (1.98 m)
- Listed weight: 208 lb (94 kg)

Career information
- NBA draft: 2012: undrafted
- Playing career: 2008–present

Career history
- 2008–2011: FMP
- 2011–2013: Crvena zvezda
- 2013–2014: Força Lleida
- 2014: Apollon Patras
- 2014–2016: Partizan
- 2016–2017: Koroivos
- 2017–2018: Saint-Chamond
- 2018–2019: Al Sadd
- 2019–2020: Dinamo București
- 2020–2021: Pieno žvaigždės Pasvalys
- 2021–2022: KTE-Duna Aszfalt
- 2022–2023: BCM U Pitești
- Stats at Basketball Reference
Medals
Representing Latvia
Men's 3x3 basketball
World Cup
| Bronze medal – third place | 2026 Warsaw | Team |

Andreja Milutinović (Serbian Cyrillic: Андреја Милутиновић, born 6 August 1990) is a Serbian professional basketball player for BCM U Pitești of the Liga Națională.

== Professional career ==
Andreja grew up with FMP youth team, and later spent three years playing for their senior side. In 2011, Milutinović moved to Crvena zvezda signing one-year contract. In May 2012, he extended his contract for one more season. In February 2013, he parted ways with Crvena zvezda.

On October 5, 2013, Milutinović signed a contract with the Spanish 2nd tier league club Força Lleida. He had an option to leave if he gets some good offer from another club. He averaged 11.4 points, 3.5 rebounds and 1 assist per game. On January 11, 2014, in the middle of season, he signed a contract with the Greek team Apollon Patras until the end of season.

On July 31, 2014, Milutinović signed a two–year deal with Partizan Belgrade.

On August 19, 2016, Milutinović signed with Koroivos Amaliadas of the Greek Basket League.

On July 18, 2022, Milutinović signed with for BCM U Pitești of the Liga Națională.

== See also ==
- List of Serbian NBA Summer League players
