= Nemanja Bezbradica =

Serbian basketball player (born 1993)

Free agent
- Position: Power forward / center

Personal information
- Born: 29 May 1993 (age 33) Knin, Croatia
- Listed height: 2.07 m (6 ft 9 in)
- Listed weight: 105 kg (231 lb)

Career information
- NBA draft: 2015: undrafted
- Playing career: 2011–present

Career history
- 2011–2012: OKK Beograd
- 2012–2013: BKK Radnički
- 2013–2015: Partizan
- 2016: Zrinjski Mostar
- 2016: VEF Riga
- 2017–2019: Beovuk 72
- 2020–2021: Olomoucko
- 2021–2023: BC Šiauliai
- 2024-: CS Vâlcea 1924

Career highlights
- Serbian League champion (2014)
Medals
Representing Serbia
Men's basketball
U18 European Championship
Silver medal – second place	2011 Poland	Team
U16 European Championship
Bronze medal – third place	2009 Lithuania	Team
Men's 3x3
Youth Olympic Games
Gold medal – first place	2010 Singapore	Team competition

Nemanja Bezbradica (Serbian: Немања Безбрадица, born 29 May 1993) is a Serbian professional basketball player who plays for CS Vâlcea 1924 in the National Romanian Basketball League (LNBM).

== Professional career ==
Bezbradica started his career in OKK Beograd. He spent there one season, averaging 5.3 points and 2.8 rebounds per game in the Serbian League, and 8.7 points and 4.1 rebounds per game in the BIBL. Next season, he signed for BKK Radnički. In the 2012–13 Basketball League of Serbia, he averaged 9.3 points and 4.3 rebounds in 27 games for Crusaders.

In September 2013, Bezbradica signed a multi-year contract with Partizan. In his first season with Partizan, he won the Basketball League of Serbia defeating arch rivals Crvena zvezda with 3–1 in the final series. In July 2015, he left Partizan.

On 27 December 2015 Bezbradica signed with Zrinjski Mostar of the Bosnian League for the rest of the season. On 8 March 2016 he left Zrinjski and signed with Italian club Varese. However, he never played in an official game for Varese.

On 12 September 2016, Bezbradica signed a two-month deal with Latvian club VEF Riga. On 30 November 2016 he parted ways with Riga.

On 6 October 2021, Bezbradica signed with BC Šiauliai of the Lithuanian Basketball League (LKL). On 22 November 2023, he mutually parted ways with the club.

== National team career ==
Bezbradica was a members of the Serbian under-18 national team that the silver medal at the 2011 FIBA Europe Under-18 Championship. Over eight tournament games he averaged 8.1 points and 3.5 rebounds per game.
