= Mihajlo Andrić =

Serbian basketball player (born 1994)

No. 37 – CB Breogán
- Position: Small forward / shooting guard
- League: Liga ACB

Personal information
- Born: January 4, 1994 (age 32) Kragujevac, FR Yugoslavia
- Listed height: 2.01 m (6 ft 7 in)
- Listed weight: 98 kg (216 lb)

Career information
- NBA draft: 2016: undrafted
- Playing career: 2012–present

Career history
- 2012–2018: Partizan Belgrade
- 2018–2020: Göttingen
- 2020–2021: Kolossos Rodou
- 2021–2022: Afyon Belediye
- 2022: Promitheas Patras
- 2022–2024: Andorra
- 2024–2025: Estudiantes
- 2025–present: CB Breogán

Career highlights
- 2× Serbian League champion (2013, 2014); Serbian Cup winner (2018)
Medals
Men's basketball
Representing Serbia
U20 European Championship
Bronze medal – third place	2014 Greece	National Team
U19 World Championship
Silver medal – second place	2013 Czech Republic	National Team
U18 European Championship
Bronze medal – third place	2012 Lithuania/Latvia	National Team
Men's basketball 3x3
U18 World Championships
Gold medal – first place	2012 Spain	National Team

Mihajlo Andrić (Serbian Cyrillic: Михајло Андрић; born January 4, 1994) is a Serbian professional basketball player for CB Breogán of the Spanish Liga ACB.

== Professional career ==
On 15 November 2013, Andrić played his first match in Euroleague against CSKA Moscow where he spend almost 12 minutes on the court. On 31 January 2014, against Lokomotiv Kuban, Andrić has played his best game of the season in the Euroleague Top 16 where he scored 8 points and enrolled 1 assist. In his second season with the team, first as a senior, he won the Basketball League of Serbia by defeating arch rivals Crvena zvezda with 3–1 in the final series. He left Partizan in July 2018.

Andrić played for Göttingen in Germany between 2018 and 2020. During the 2019–20 season, he averaged 6.9 points, 2.9 rebounds and 1.1 assists per game.

On 16 September 2020, Andrić signed with Kolossos Rodou of the Greek Basket League. In 18 games, he averaged a career-high of 12.9 points (shooting with 46.5% from the 3-point line), 3.9 rebounds and 1.8 assists per contest.

On August 24, 2021, Andrić signed with Afyon Belediye of the Turkish Basketbol Süper Ligi (BSL). In 10 games, he averaged 8.4 points, 3.1 rebounds and 2.2 assists per contest.

On January 11, 2022, Andrić moved to Promitheas Patras of the Greek Basket League and the EuroCup for the rest of the season. In 22 league games, he averaged 7.8 points (shooting with 42.6% from the 3-point line), 2.6 rebounds and 1.2 assists, playing around 22 minutes per contest.

On August 21, 2022, he has signed with MoraBanc Andorra of the LEB Oro.

On September 23, 2025, he signed with CB Breogán of the Spanish Liga ACB.

== Serbian national team ==
Andrić played for Serbian national team at the 2013 FIBA Under-19 World Championship in Prague and won a silver medal. He averaged 8.0 points and 2.4 rebounds per game.

== 3x3 basketball ==
Andrić won gold medal at the 2012 FIBA 3x3 Under-18 World Championships representing Serbia national 3x3 under-18 team together with Luka Anđušić, Miloš Janković, and Rade Zagorac.
