= Aleksandar Cvetković (basketball) =

Serbian basketball player

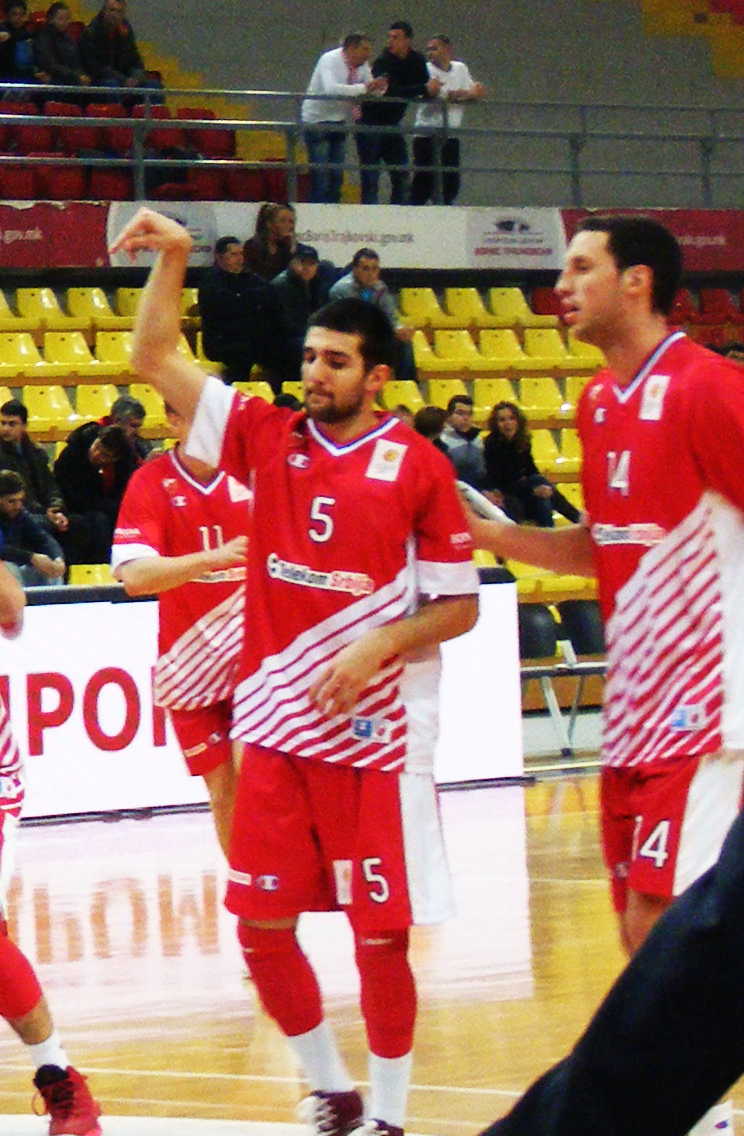

Personal information
- Born: September 12, 1993 (age 33) Belgrade, Serbia, FR Yugoslavia
- Listed height: 6 ft 2 in (1.88 m)
- Listed weight: 165 lb (75 kg)

Career information
- NBA draft: 2015: undrafted
- Playing career: 2010–present
- Position: Point guard

Career history
- 2010–2015: Crvena zvezda
- 2013–2015: →MZT Skopje
- 2015–2016: Partizan
- 2016-2017: Manresa
- 2017–2018: Estudiantes
- 2018–2019: Breogán
- 2019: Igokea
- 2019–2020: Manresa
- 2020–2021: Estudiantes
- 2021: Plateros de Fresnillo
- 2021–2023: Coosur Real Betis
- 2023–2024: Spartak Subotica
- 2024–2025: Real Betis
- 2025–2026: Mladost Maxbet

Career highlights
- Radivoj Korać Cup winner (2013); 2× Macedonian League champion (2014, 2015); Macedonian Cup winner (2014)
Medals
Men's basketball
Representing Serbia
U19 World Cup
Silver medal – second place	2011 Latvia	U19 National Team
U16 European Championship
Bronze medal – third place	2009 Lithuania	U16 National Team

Aleksandar Cvetković (Serbian Cyrillic: Александар Цветковић; born September 12, 1993) is a Serbian professional basketball player.

== Club career ==
=== Crvena zvezda ===
Cvetković grew up with Crvena zvezda youth team. In 2010 he stepped into the first team under the guidance of head coach Mihailo Uvalin. In 2012, he competed at Nike Hoop Summit representing Serbia. Cvetković was named the 7th 2011 FIBA Europe Young Player of the Year in February 2011. On 21 November 2012, Cvetković has played his most efficient game in the 2012–13 EuroCup against Dinamo Sassari, where he scored 9 points. On 24 October 2013, he made his debut for Crvena zvezda in EuroLeague against Maccabi Tel Aviv. Anoteher noteworthy performance took place on 20 December 2013, against Lietuvos rytas in the last round of regular season in EuroLeague, where Cvetković has scored 4 points in nearly seven minutes on the court. Cvetković scored 8 points for the Crvena zvezda, against Radnički Kragujevac in the third round of ABA League and that is his most efficient game in the half-season league for Crvena zvezda in ABA League.

Cvetković did not secure a spot in the starting line-up for Crvena zvezda. Consequently, in the winter of 2014, he went on a loan to MZT Skopje by the end of the season. In the summer of 2015, Cvetković moved to the test in Valencia. Cvetković has played several friendly matches where he was solid but did not pass the test, so in September he left the preparation in Valencia.

==== MZT Skopje ====
On 27 December 2013, due to his dissatisfaction over playing time, the 20-year-old was sent on loan to MZT Skopje until the end of the 2014–15 season. On 3 January 2014, Cvetković made his debut in ABA League for MZT scoring 10, in 73–63 home win against Szolnoki Olaj. On 1 March 2014, he was top scorer with 13 points in his team in away victory 65–79, against Igokea. Cvetković was the best in his team against Cibona in Zagreb and was close to reach triple-double, achieving 17 points, 10 rebounds and 8 assists. After the match, Cvetković was voted for MVP of 23rd round of ABA League. Counting only games in MZT, Cvetković averaged 8 points, 2.3 assists and 3.1 rebounds per game for the 12 games he played in the ABA league.

=== Partizan ===
On 29 September 2015, he signed with Partizan Belgrade. He was given the number 4 shirt that previously carried Milenko Tepić. He made his debut for Partizan on 2 October 2015, against Metalac in the first round of the ABA League and was most efficient in his team with 13 points. On 16 January 2016, against Krka, Cvetković was the most efficient player in that match with 21 points, 3 rebounds and 7 assist in the victory of his team's 70–75. After the game he was declared for the MVP of 20th round of the ABA League with 42 efficiency. On 25 January 2016, in the eternal derby against Crvena zvezda and his former club, he scored 16 points and had 3 rebounds and 3 assists in the big victory of his team's 86–81 win. During the 2015–16 season, in 23 games, he averaged 10.3 points, 2.4 rebounds and 3.3 assists in ABA League.

=== Spain ===
On July 26, 2016, Cvetković signed a one-year contract with Spanish club ICL Manresa. On August 23, 2017, he signed with Estudiantes. On August 15, 2018, he signed with Cafés Candelas Breogán of the Liga ACB.

On November 25, 2019, he had a temporary contract with Baxi Manresa of the Spanish Liga ACB to replace the injured Frankie Ferrari.

On June 14, 2020, he had signed with Mega Bemax of the ABA League. One month later, he parted ways with Mega and signed for Movistar Estudiantes.

He joined Plateros de Fresnillo of the Mexican Liga Nacional de Baloncesto Profesional in 2021 and averaged 7.6 points, 1.9 rebounds, and 4.4 assists per game.

Cvetković signed with Real Betis on November 26.

== National team career ==
=== 2009 Under-16 European Championship ===
In the first match of the tournament, Cvetković scored 12 points and had 3 rebounds and 5 assists in his team's defeat of the France. Cvetković played his best game of the tournament against Spain in the semifinals where he scored 24 points and had 7 rebounds in the defeat of his team's 75–88. Cvetković scored double-double with 20 points and 10 rebounds against Poland in a match for third place. Cvetković, as one of the best players of Serbia and as captain won a bronze medal at the 2009 FIBA Europe Under-16 Championship in Lithuania. In 9 games played on the tournament, Cvetković has averaged was 14.6 points, 4.8 rebounds and 2.4 assists.

=== 2011 Under-19 World Cup ===
On 30 June 2011, in the first match of the group stage against China, Cvetković was the most efficient player of his team having scored 20 points along with 3 rebounds and 6 assists in the victory of his team's 73–78. Consequently, a day later against United States, he was the most effective player in the match with 20 scored points, 4 rebounds and 2 assists. On 2 July 2011, against Egypt, Cvetković has played his best game of the tournament, where he scored 24 points with 4 rebounds and 3 assists in the victory of his team's 85–67. In the final, Serbia lost to Lithuania with a 67–85 score however Cvetkovic performed well, scoring 11 points, 5 rebounds, and 1 assist. Aleksandar Cvetković has played 9 games in the tournament and had single digit points in only 2 matches. In 9 games played on the tournament, he has averaged 14.4 points, 3.8 rebounds and 2.7 assists. After the tournament he was named to the All–Star Five.

== Career statistics ==
Legend
GP	Games played	GS	Games started	MPG	Minutes per game
FG%	Field-goal percentage	3P%	3-point field-goal percentage	FT%	Free-throw percentage
RPG	Rebounds per game	APG	Assists per game	SPG	Steals per game
BPG	Blocks per game	PPG	Points per game	PIR	Performance index rating
**Bold**	Career high

=== EuroLeague ===
Year	Team	GP	GS	MPG	FG%	3P%	FT%	RPG	APG	SPG	BPG	PPG	PIR
2013–14	Crvena zvezda	3	0	3.54			100%	0.3	1	1	0	1.3	2

=== Domestic leagues ===
Season	Team	League	GP	MPG	FG%	3P%	FT%	RPG	APG	SPG	BPG	PPG
2010–11	Crvena zvezda	ABA League	16	15.5	.653	.205	.370	1.5	1.1	0.8	.0	3.4
2011–12	Crvena zvezda	ABA League	13	8.3	.516	.478	.750	1	1.2	0.2	.0	3.2
2012–13	Crvena zvezda	ABA League	24	8.8	.481	.384	.667	1.1	1	0.5	.0	3
2013–14	Crvena zvezda	ABA League	10	7.8	.540	.381	.938	1.0	1.5	0.2	.0	2.3
2013–14	MZT Skopje	ABA League	12	22.2	.520	.373	.765	3.1	2.5	1.3	.0	8.1
2014–15	MZT Skopje	ABA League	26	24.7	.520	.373	.765	3.5	4.1	1.4	.0	8.7
2015–16	KK Partizan	ABA League	23	22.8	.461	.403	.831	2.4	3.3	1.3	.0	10.3
