= Eurocup 2014–15 Regular Season Group E =

Standings and results for Group E of the Regular Season phase of the 2014–15 Eurocup basketball tournament.

== Standings ==
Pos	Team	Pld	W	L	PF	PA	PD
1	(Lithuania) Lietuvos Rytas	10	8	2	840	774	+66
2	(Turkey) Banvit	10	6 (Note: Head-to-head: 1-1 (+3))	4	788	768	+20
3	(Russia) Krasny Oktyabr	10	6 (Note: Head-to-head: 1-1 (-3))	4	759	765	−6
4	(Romania) Asesoft Ploiești	10	5	5	814	833	−19
5	(Serbia) Partizan NIS	10	3	7	734	774	−40
6	(Israel) Hapoel Jerusalem	10	2	8	806	827	−21

Source: Euroleague Basketball

== Fixtures and results ==
=== Game 1 ===
15 October 2014

Lietuvos Rytas (Lithuania)	92–65	(Serbia) Partizan NIS

15 October 2014

Banvit (Turkey)	80–76	(Israel) Hapoel Jerusalem

15 October 2014

Krasny Oktyabr (Russia)	75–81	(Romania) Asesoft Ploiești

=== Game 2 ===
22 October 2014

Partizan NIS (Serbia)	61–77	(Turkey) Banvit

22 October 2014

Asesoft Ploiești (Romania)	103–83	(Lithuania) Lietuvos Rytas

22 October 2014

Hapoel Jerusalem (Israel)	78–79	(Russia) Krasny Oktyabr

=== Game 3 ===
29 October 2014

Krasny Oktyabr (Russia)	63–77	(Lithuania) Lietuvos Rytas

29 October 2014

Banvit (Turkey)	81–66	(Romania) Asesoft Ploiești

29 October 2014

Hapoel Jerusalem (Israel)	82–79	(Serbia) Partizan NIS

=== Game 4 ===
4 November 2014

Lietuvos Rytas (Lithuania)	92–80	(Turkey) Banvit

5 November 2014

Krasny Oktyabr (Russia)	61–59	(Serbia) Partizan NlS

5 November 2014

Asesoft Ploiești (Romania)	83–74	(Israel) Hapoel Jerusalem

=== Game 5 ===
12 November 2014

Partizan NlS (Serbia)	76–69	(Romania) Asesoft Ploiești

12 November 2014

Banvit (Turkey)	90–75	(Russia) Krasny Oktyabr

12 November 2014

Hapoel Jerusalem (Israel)	70–81	(Lithuania) Lietuvos Rytas

=== Game 6 ===
18 November 2014

Partizan NlS (Serbia)	76–85	(Lithuania) Lietuvos Rytas

19 November 2014

Asesoft Ploiești (Romania)	79–96	(Russia) Krasny Oktyabr

19 November 2014

Hapoel Jerusalem (Israel)	78–82	(Turkey) Banvit

=== Game 7 ===
26 November 2014

Krasny Oktyabr (Russia)	69–67	(Israel) Hapoel Jerusalem

26 November 2014

Banvit (Turkey)	90–85	(Serbia) Partizan NlS

26 November 2014

Lietuvos Rytas (Lithuania)	79–72	(Romania) Asesoft Ploiești

=== Game 8 ===
3 December 2014

Partizan NlS (Serbia)	64–83	(Israel) Hapoel Jerusalem

3 December 2014

Lietuvos Rytas (Lithuania)	82–91	(Russia) Krasny Oktyabr

3 December 2014

Asesoft Ploiești (Romania)	84–74	(Turkey) Banvit

=== Game 9 ===
10 December 2014

Banvit (Turkey)	66–71	(Lithuania) Lietuvos Rytas

10 December 2014

Partizan NlS (Serbia)	84–70	(Russia) Krasny Oktyabr

10 December 2014

Hapoel Jerusalem (Israel)	110–112	(Romania) Asesoft Ploiești

=== Game 10 ===
17 December 2014

Krasny Oktyabr (Russia)	80–68	(Turkey) Banvit

17 December 2014

Lietuvos Rytas (Lithuania)	98–88	(Israel) Hapoel Jerusalem

17 December 2014

Asesoft Ploiești (Romania)	65–85	(Serbia) Partizan NlS

== Team Leaders ==
	(Romania) Asesoft Ploiești	(Turkey) Banvit	(Israel) Hapoel Jerusalem	(Russia) Krasny Oktyabr	(Lithuania) Lietuvos Rytas	(Serbia) Partizan NIS
PPG	(United States) Dee Brown (13.6)	(Bulgaria) Earl Rowland (16.0)	(United States) Bracey Wright (17.6)	(United States) Randy Culpepper (18.3)	(Lithuania) Gediminas Orelik (14.6)	(Serbia) Milan Mačvan (18.0)
RPG	(Ghana) Alhaji Mohammed (4.5)	(Belarus) Vladimir Veremeenko (5.8)	(Venezuela) Donta Smith (7.6)	(United States) Romeo Travis (6.8)	(Lithuania) Antanas Kavaliauskas (4.9)	(Serbia) Milan Mačvan (8.7)
APG	(United States) Dee Brown (7.9)	(Bulgaria) Earl Rowland (5.3)	(Venezuela) Donta Smith (5.7)	(Russia) Anton Ponkrashov (4.8)	(Lithuania) Adas Juškevičius (5.3)	(Serbia) Dragan Milosavljević (4.3)
