= Marko Ljubičić =

Serbian basketball player

Vojvodina
- Position: Point guard
- League: Basketball League of Serbia

Personal information
- Born: 23 July 1987 (age 39) Novi Sad, SR Serbia, SFR Yugoslavia
- Listed height: 1.96 m (6 ft 5 in)
- Listed weight: 87 kg (192 lb)

Career information
- NBA draft: 2009: undrafted
- Playing career: 2008–present

Career history
- 2008–2009: Superfund
- 2009–2010: Budućnost
- 2010–2011: Metalac
- 2011–2012: Ikaros Kallitheas
- 2012–2013: Cherkasy Monkeys
- 2014: Meridiana
- 2014: Bàsquet Manresa
- 2014–2015: Metalac
- 2015–2016: MZT Skopje
- 2016–2017: FMP
- 2017–2018: Igokea
- 2018–2019: Cibona
- 2019–2020: Alba Fehérvár
- 2020: Podgorica
- 2020–2022: Vojvodina
- 2022: Mladost Zemun
- 2022–present: Vojvodina

Career highlights
- Croatian League champion (2019); Montenegrin League champion (2010); Macedonian League champion (2016); Montenegrin Cup winner (2010); Macedonian Cup winner (2016); Bosnian Cup winner (2018); Serbian Super League MVP (2011); Serbian League Cup winner (2021)

Marko Ljubičić (Serbian Cyrillic: Марко Љубичић; born 23 July 1987) is a Serbian professional basketball player for Vojvodina of the Basketball League of Serbia.

== Professional career ==
Ljubičić was named MVP of the Serbian Super League in 2011. In July 2012, he signed a one-year deal with Cherkasy Monkeys. In January 2014, he returned to Serbia and signed with KK Meridiana. He left them after only one game and signed with Bàsquet Manresa where he stayed for the rest of the season. In September 2014, he returned to his former team Metalac, signing a one-year contract.

In August 2015, he signed with Macedonian club MZT Skopje. For the 2016–17 season he moved to FMP Beograd. In August 2017, he signed with Igokea.

On 4 July 2018 he signed with Cibona.

Ljubičić spent the 2019–20 season with Alba Fehérvár and averaged 11.7 points and 5.9 assists per game. On 11 November 2020 he signed with Podgorica of the Montenegrin First League. In December 2020, he signed with his hometown team Vojvodina.

== National team career ==
Ljubičić was a member of the Serbian university team that won the gold medal at the 2011 Summer Universiade in Shenzhen, China.
