= Božo Đumić =

Serbian basketball player

Hercegovac
- Position: Center / power forward
- League: Second League of Serbia

Personal information
- Born: January 7, 1992 (age 34) Vrbas, Serbia, FR Yugoslavia
- Listed height: 2.08 m (6 ft 10 in)
- Listed weight: 102 kg (225 lb)

Career information
- NBA draft: 2014: undrafted
- Playing career: 2009–present

Career history
- 2009–2011: Novi Sad
- 2011–2013: Vojvodina Srbijagas
- 2013–2014: Napredak Kruševac
- 2014–2015: Vojvodina Srbijagas
- 2015–2016: Partizan
- 2016–2017: Sloboda Tuzla
- 2017: FMP
- 2017–2018: Helios Suns
- 2018: Ferroviario Beira
- 2019: Blokotehna
- 2019: Novi Pazar
- 2019–2021: Borac Banja Luka
- 2021–present: Hercegovac Gajdobra

Career highlights
- Balkan League champion (2019)

Božo Đumić (Serbian Cyrillic: Божо Ђумић, born 7 January 1992) is a Serbian professional basketball player for Hercegovac Gajdobra of the Second Basketball League of Serbia.

He arrived to Partizan from Vojvodina Srbijagas as a replacement for Đorđe Gagić in January 2015. In 2018, Đumić played for Ferroviario Beira of the Mozambican League. Currently play for Hercegovac Gajdobra of the Second Basketball League of Serbia.
