= 2013–14 KK Partizan season =

Partizan NIS Belgrade
2013–14 season
- President: Predrag Danilović
- Head coach: Duško Vujošević
- Basketball League of Serbia: Champion
- Radivoj Korać Cup: Quarter-finals
- Adriatic League: Semifinals
- Euroleague: Top 16
- Highest home attendance: vs Real Madrid(21,374)
- Lowest home attendance: vs Union Olimpija(4,500)
Home	Away

In the 2013–14 season, Partizan NIS Belgrade competed in the Basketball League of Serbia, the Radivoj Korać Cup, the Adriatic League and the Euroleague.

== Players ==
=== NBA Rights ===
- (Latvia) Dāvis Bertāns – San Antonio Spurs
- (France) Joffrey Lauvergne – Denver Nuggets

=== Current roster ===
Note: Flags indicate national team eligibility at FIBA-sanctioned events. Players may hold other non-FIBA nationalities not displayed.

KK Partizan NIS roster
Players
Coaches

Pos.	No.	Nat.	Name	Ht.	Wt.	Age
G/F	4	(Serbia)	Tepić, Milenko	2.02 m (6 ft 8 in)	102 kg (225 lb)	38 – 27 February 1987
G	5	(Serbia)	Aranitović, Petar	1.88 m (6 ft 2 in)	75 kg (165 lb)	30 – 20 September 1994
F/C	7	(France)	Lauvergne, Joffrey	2.11 m (6 ft 11 in)	109 kg (240 lb)	33 – 30 September 1991
G/F	8	(Serbia)	Pavlović, Aleksandar	2.01 m (6 ft 7 in)	106 kg (234 lb)	41 – 15 November 1983
PG	9	(France)	Westermann, Léo (injured)	1.98 m (6 ft 6 in)	86 kg (190 lb)	32 – 24 July 1992
G	10	(France)	Dallo, Boris	1.96 m (6 ft 5 in)	81 kg (179 lb)	31 – 12 March 1994
C	11	(Serbia)	Milutinov, Nikola	2.12 m (6 ft 11 in)	100 kg (220 lb)	30 – 30 December 1994
G/F	12	(Serbia)	Milosavljević, Dragan (injured) (C)	1.98 m (6 ft 6 in)	91 kg (201 lb)	35 – 11 May 1989
G	13	(Serbia)	Bogdanović, Bogdan	1.96 m (6 ft 5 in)	91 kg (201 lb)	32 – 18 August 1992
C	14	(Serbia)	Gagić, Đorđe	2.11 m (6 ft 11 in)	114 kg (251 lb)	34 – 28 December 1990
C	15	(Serbia)	Musli, Dejan	2.13 m (7 ft 0 in)	119 kg (262 lb)	34 – 3 January 1991
G/F	19	(Serbia)	Andrić, Mihajlo	2.00 m (6 ft 7 in)	85 kg (187 lb)	31 – 4 January 1994
G/F	21	(United States)	Kinsey, Tarence (injured)	2.00 m (6 ft 7 in)	86 kg (190 lb)	40 – 21 March 1984
F	33	(Serbia)	Bezbradica, Nemanja	2.06 m (6 ft 9 in)	96 kg (212 lb)	31 – 29 March 1993
F	44	(Latvia)	Bertāns, Dāvis	2.08 m (6 ft 10 in)	95 kg (209 lb)	32 – 12 November 1992
C	55	(Serbia)	Šalić, Đoko	2.10 m (6 ft 11 in)	107 kg (236 lb)	29 – 18 September 1995

Head coach

- (Montenegro) Duško Vujošević

Assistant coach(es)

- (Serbia) Velimir Gašić
- (Serbia) Petar Božić
- (Serbia) Goran Tadić

Strength & conditioning coach(es)

- (Montenegro) Radoman Šćekić
- (Serbia) Zlatko Tešić

Physiotherapist(s)

- (Serbia) Predrag Šapina

Team manager

- (Serbia) Dragan Todorić

Legend

- (C) Team captain
- Injured

- Roster
Updated: 2 May 2014

=== Depth chart ===
Pos.	Starting 5	Bench 1	Bench 2	Reserve	Injured
C	Nikola Milutinov	Dejan Musli	Đoko Šalić
PF	Joffrey Lauvergne	Đorđe Gagić
SF	Dāvis Bertāns	Aleksandar Pavlović	Nemanja Bezbradica		Tarence Kinsey
SG	Bogdan Bogdanović	Mihajlo Andrić			Dragan Milosavljević
PG	Milenko Tepić	Boris Dallo		Petar Aranitović	Léo Westermann

=== Roster changes ===
==== In ====
No.	Pos.	Nat.	Name	Age	Moving from	Source
18	C	(Serbia)	Đoko Šalić	18	(Bosnia and Herzegovina) Spars	
10	PG	(France)	Boris Dallo	19	(France) Poitiers	
21	G/F	(United States)	Tarence Kinsey	29	(Spain) Unicaja	
33	PF	(Serbia)	Nemanja Bezbradica	20	(Serbia) BKK Radnički	
4	SG	(Serbia)	Milenko Tepić	26	(Lithuania) Lietuvos rytas	
8	G/F	(Serbia)	Aleksandar Pavlović	30	Free Agent	

==== Out ====
No.	Pos.	Nat.	Name	Age	Moving to	Source
10	PG	(Bosnia and Herzegovina)	Nemanja Gordić	25	(Bosnia and Herzegovina) Igokea	
11	SF	(Serbia)	Vladimir Lučić	24	(Spain) Valencia	
22	SF	(Serbia)	Marko Čakarević	25	(Serbia) Metalac	
31	PF	(Serbia)	Branislav Đekić	22	(North Macedonia) ABA Strumica	

== Competitions ==
	Competition	Position	Record
(Serbia)	Basketball League of Serbia	Winners	18–2
(Serbia)	Radivoj Korać Cup	Quarterfinals	0–1
(European Union)	Adriatic League	Semifinals	18–9
(European Union)	Euroleague	TOP 16	7–17

=== Basketball League of Serbia ===
==== Standings ====
Pos	Team	Total						
Pos	Team	P	W	L	F	A	D	Pts
1	Partizan NIS	14	13	1	1199	1005	+194	27
2	Crvena Zvezda Telekom	14	11	3	1187	988	+199	25
3	Mega Vizura	14	9	5	1226	1148	+78	23
4	Radnički Kragujevac	14	8	6	1184	1090	+94	22

P=Matches played, W=Matches won, L=Matches lost, F=Points for, A=Points against, D=Points difference, Pts=Points

==== Results and positions by round ====
Round	1	2	3	4	5	6	7	8	9	10	11	12	13	14
Ground	A	A	H	A	H	A	H	H	H	A	H	A	H	A
Result	W	W	W	W	L	W	W	W	W	W	W	W	W	W
Position	4	2	2	2	2	2	2	2	2	1	1	1	1	1

Updated to match(es) played on 31 May 2014. Source: kls.rs
A = Away; H = Home; W = Win; D = Draw; L = Loss

==== Regular season ====
7 April 2014
18:00

Report

Radnički Kragujevac	69–76	Partizan NIS
Scoring by quarter: 28–22, 16–19, 6–16, 19–19
Pts: Birčević 18; Rebs: Birčević 10; Asts: Marinović 12		Pts: Pavlović 22; Rebs: Lauvergne 9 Asts: Tepić, Lauvergne 4

Jezero Hall, Kragujevac
Attendance: 3,500
Referees: Marko Juras, Aleksandar Glišić, Marko Pecelj.

14 April 2014
19:00

Report

Borac Mozzart Sport	75–80	Partizan NIS
Scoring by quarter: 13–21, 21–12, 23–26, 18–21
Pts: Pešaković 25; Rebs: Maravić 5 Asts: Pešaković 4		Pts: Pavlović 21; Rebs: Lauvergne 8 Asts: Tepić 4

Hala Borca, Čačak
Attendance: 3,000
Referees: Dragan Nešković, Uroš Obrknežević, Vladimir Vesković.

16 April 2014
19:30

Report

Partizan NIS	101–71	Crnokosa
Scoring by quarter: 34–17, 18–22, 21–20, 28–12
Pts: Musli 22; Rebs: 3 players 5 Asts: Dallo 7		Pts: B.Vujošević 15; Rebs: Stanimirović 5 Asts: B.Vujošević 4

Pionir Hall, Belgrade
Attendance: 1,300
Referees: Vladimir Jevtović, Milan Mažić, Radoš Arsenijević.

19 April 2014
19:30

Report

Metalac Farmakom	67–95	Partizan NIS
Scoring by quarter: 27–19, 10–23, 9–31, 21–22
Pts: Bakić 17; Rebs: Woolridge 6 Asts: Bakić 6		Pts: Bogdanović 18; Rebs: Lauvergne 12; Asts: Bogdanović 5

Valjevo Sports Hall, Valjevo
Attendance: 2,800
Referees: Milija Vojinović, Nemanja Ninković, Miodrag Licina.

30 April 2014
19:00

Report

Partizan NIS	72–75	Crvena Zvezda Telekom
Scoring by quarter: 20–16, 23–12, 10–22, 19–25
Pts: Pavlović 20; Rebs: Lauvergne 9 Asts: Tepić, Pavlović 4		Pts: Radenović 17; Rebs: Marjanović 9 Asts: Nelson 8

Pionir Hall, Belgrade
Attendance: 5,800
Referees: Ilija Belošević, Uroš Obrknežević, Milan Mažić.

4 May 2014
18:00

[]

FMP	vs.	Partizan NIS

Železnik Hall, Belgrade

7 May 2014
19:30

[]

Partizan NIS	vs.	Mega Vizura

Pionir Hall, Belgrade

10 May 2014

[]

Partizan NIS	vs.	Radnički Kragujevac

Pionir Hall, Belgrade

13 May 2014

[]

Partizan NIS	vs.	Borac Mozzart Sport

Pionir Hall, Belgrade

17 May 2014

[]

Crnokosa	vs.	Partizan NIS

Kosjerić Sports Hall, Kosjerić

20 May 2014

[]

Partizan NIS	vs.	Metalac Farmakom

Pionir Hall, Belgrade

24 May 2014

[]

Crvena Zvezda Telekom	vs.	Partizan NIS

Pionir Hall, Belgrade

27 May 2014

[]

Partizan NIS	vs.	FMP

Pionir Hall, Belgrade

31 May 2014

[]

Mega Vizura	vs.	Partizan NIS

Sports Hall, Smederevo

== Radivoj Korać Cup ==
Quarterfinals

7 February 2014	Partizan	86–95(OT)	FMP	Belgrade
18:30 CET	Scoring by quarter: 17–22, 21–23, 24–17, 18–18, Overtime: 9–15
	Pts: Aranitović 20; Rebs: Gagić 12; Asts: Dallo 5	Report	Pts: Čvorović 27; Rebs: Čvorović 11; Asts: Gudurić 8	Arena: Pionir Hall; Attendance: 1,000; Referees: Miodrag Licina, Ivan Stefanović, Jasmina Juras

== Adriatic League ==
=== Standings ===
	Team	Pld	W	L	PF	PA	Diff	Points	%
1	(Serbia) Crvena Zvezda	26	22	4	2017	1725	+292	48	.846
2	(Croatia) Cedevita	26	19	7	1917	1802	+115	45	.731
3	(Serbia) Partizan	26	18	8	1837	1677	+160	44	.692
4	(Croatia) Cibona	26	17	9	2001	1919	+82	43	.654

Pld – Played; W – Won; L – Lost; PF – Points for; PA – Points against; Diff – Difference; Pts – Points.

=== Results and positions by round ===
Round	1	2	3	4	5	6	7	8	9	10	11	12	13	14	15	16	17	18	19	20	21	22	23	24	25	26
Ground	H	H	A	H	A	H	A	H	A	H	A	H	A	A	A	H	A	H	A	H	A	H	A	H	A	H
Result	W	W	L	W	W	W	W	L	W	W	L	W	L	W	W	W	W	L	L	W	L	W	L	W	W	W
Position	3	3	3	3	2	1	1	2	2	2	2	2	2	2	2	2	2	2	3	3	3	3	3	3	3	3

Updated to match(es) played on 31 March 2014. Source: abaliga.com
A = Away; H = Home; W = Win; D = Draw; L = Loss

=== Regular season ===
6 October 2013
17:00

Report

Partizan NIS (Serbia)	67–56	(Bosnia and Herzegovina) Igokea
Scoring by quarter: 24–8, 16–13, 11–18, 16–17
Pts: Westermann 18; Rebs: Musli 10; Asts: Westermann, Bogdanović 4		Pts: Nikolić 16; Rebs: Jorović 7 Asts: Pavković, Štemberger 3

Pionir Hall
Belgrade, Serbia
Attendance: 6,500
Referees: Sreten Radović (CRO), Sašo Petek (SLO), Tomislav Vovk (CRO).

9 October 2013
18:00

Report

Partizan NIS (Serbia)	88–65	(Serbia) Mega Vizura
Scoring by quarter: 18–10, 35–26, 17–12, 18–17
Pts: Westermann 23; Rebs: Lauvergne 9 Asts: Westermann 7		Pts: Radović 26; Rebs: Jokić 8 Asts: Miljenović 5

Pionir Hall
Belgrade, Serbia
Attendance: 5,600
Referees: Milivoje Jovčić (SRB), Radomir Vojinović (MNE), Branislav Mrdak (SRB).

12 October 2013
19:00

Report

Krka (Slovenia)	60–52	(Serbia) Partizan NIS
Scoring by quarter: 16–12, 8–13, 18–11, 18–16
Pts: Murić 17; Rebs: Buljan 9 Asts: Armstead 5		Pts: Lauvergne 13; Rebs: Musli 12; Asts: Westermann 4

Leon Štukelj Hall
Novo Mesto, Slovenia
Attendance: 1,500
Referees: Srdjan Dozai (CRO), Petar Obradović (BIH), Tomislav Hordov (CRO).

20 October 2013
21:00

Report

Partizan NIS (Serbia)	80–65	(Croatia) Zadar
Scoring by quarter: 22–18, 27–14, 14–14, 17–19
Pts: Lauvergne 16; Rebs: Lauvergne 9 Asts: Bogdanović 4		Pts: Car, Ivanov 16; Rebs: Sobin 5 Asts: Lawrence 6

Pionir Hall
Belgrade, Serbia
Attendance: 5,500
Referees: Damir Javor (SLO), Ademir Zurapović (BIH), Boris Krejić (SLO).

27 October 2013
17:00

Report

MZT Skopje Aerodrom (North Macedonia)	69–70	(Serbia) Partizan NIS
Scoring by quarter: 21–16, 14–20, 16–19, 18–15
Pts: Otašević 16; Rebs: Markovski 9 Asts: Otašević 6		Pts: Kinsey 26; Rebs: Kinsey 6 Asts: Kinsey 3

Boris Trajkovski SC
Skopje, Macedonia
Attendance: 6,200
Referees: Saša Pukl (SLO), Srdjan Dožai (CRO), Alfred Jovović (CRO).

3 November 2013
17:00

Report

Partizan NIS (Serbia)	80–71	(Croatia) Cibona
Scoring by quarter: 20–15, 18–15, 20–23, 22–18
Pts: Lauvergne, Milosavljević 21; Rebs: Lauvergne, Musli 6 Asts: Milosavljević 5		Pts: Strawberry 20; Rebs: 3 players 6 Asts: Blassingame 6

Pionir Hall
Belgrade, Serbia
Attendance: 6,000
Referees: Damir Javor (SLO), Zdravko Rutešić (MNE), Andrej Lovšin (SLO).

11 November 2013
20:30

Report

Široki Primorka (Bosnia and Herzegovina)	60–81	(Serbia) Partizan NIS
Scoring by quarter: 10–24, 15–15, 16–20, 19–22
Pts: Bošnjak, Barać 12; Rebs: Barać 9 Asts: Jones 4		Pts: Milosavljević, Bogdanović 19; Rebs: Lauvergne 10; Asts: Bogdanović 6

Pecara
Široki Brijeg, Bosnia-Herzegovina
Attendance: 3,500
Referees: Siniša Herceg (CRO), Radomir Vojinović (MNE), Sašo Petek (SLO).

18 November 2013
20:30

Report

Partizan NIS (Serbia)	83–86 (OT)	(Serbia) Crvena zvezda Telekom
Scoring by quarter: 21–14, 18–24, 21–16, 13–19, Overtime: 10–13
Pts: Bogdanović 22; Rebs: Lauvergne 10; Asts: 3 Players 3		Pts: Marjanović 27; Rebs: Schilb 8 Asts: Schilb 6

Pionir Hall
Belgrade, Serbia
Attendance: 6,500
Referees: Saša Pukl (SLO), Sreten Radović (CRO), Milija Vojinović (SRB).

24 November 2013
19:00

Report

Radnički (Serbia)	66–92	(Serbia) Partizan NIS
Scoring by quarter: 13–25, 14–20, 13–22, 26–25
Pts: Lešić, Dimić 13; Rebs: Yarou 10; Asts: Marinović 5		Pts: Bogdanović 22; Rebs: Musli 7 Asts: Bogdanović 8

Jezero Hall
Kragujevac, Serbia
Attendance: 4,000
Referees: Srdjan Dožai (CRO), Andrej Jersan (SLO), Luka Kardum (CRO).

1 December 2013
17:00

Report

Partizan NIS (Serbia)	63–52	(Slovenia) Union Olimpija
Scoring by quarter: 17–20, 18–11, 14–13, 14–8
Pts: Bogdanović 21; Rebs: Lauvergne 8 Asts: Bogdanović 6		Pts: Gailius 15; Rebs: Gailius 5 Asts: Jackson 4

Pionir Hall
Belgrade, Serbia
Attendance: 4,500
Referees: Siniša Herceg (CRO), Tomislav Hordov (CRO), Josip Radojković (CRO).

8 December 2013
17:00

Report

Szolnoki Olaj (Hungary)	76–71	(Serbia) Partizan NIS
Scoring by quarter: 14–27, 15–16, 22–12, 25–16
Pts: Warren 20; Rebs: Warren 7 Asts: Holiday 7		Pts: Bogdanović 25; Rebs: Lauvergne 9 Asts: Bogdanović 4

Tiszaligeti Sportcsarnok
Szolnok, Hungary
Attendance: 1,850
Referees: Saša Pukl (SLO), Tomislav Vovk (CRO), Marko Vučković (SLO).

15 December 2013
19:00

Report

Partizan NIS (Serbia)	72–65	(Montenegro) Budućnost VOLI
Scoring by quarter: 16–12, 19–21, 19–22, 18–10
Pts: Kinsey 16; Rebs: Lauvergne 11; Asts: Bogdanović, Milosavljević 4		Pts: Šehović 15; Rebs: Akindele 9 Asts: A. Popović 4

Pionir Hall
Belgrade, Serbia
Attendance: 5,500
Referees: Sreten Radović (CRO), Srdjan Dožai (CRO), Andrej Jeršan (SLO).

22 December 2013
19:00

Report

Cedevita (Croatia)	68–65	(Serbia) Partizan NIS
Scoring by quarter: 21–17, 13–14, 19–18, 15–16
Pts: Smith 20; Rebs: Ramljak 7 Asts: Smith, Ramljak 2		Pts: Kinsey 24; Rebs: Kinsey 7 Asts: Milosavljević 6

Dom Sportova
Zagreb, Croatia
Attendance: 3,200
Referees: Saša Pukl (SLO), Matej Boltauzer (SLO), Mario Majkić (SLO).

29 December 2013
17:00

Report

Igokea (Bosnia and Herzegovina)	80–83 (OT)	(Serbia) Partizan NIS
Scoring by quarter: 30–26, 7–20, 17–15, 17–10, Overtime: 9–12
Pts: Gordić 22; Rebs: Gordić, Williams 5 Asts: Gordić, Gipson 5		Pts: Bogdanović 26; Rebs: Gagić 15; Asts: Bogdanović, Milosavljević 4

Laktaši Sports Hall
Laktaši, Bosnia and Herzegovina
Attendance: 3,000
Referees: Sreten Radović (CRO), Damir Javor (SLO), Boris Krejić (SLO).

29 December 2013
17:00

Report

Mega Vizura (Serbia)	76–81	(Serbia) Partizan NIS
Scoring by quarter: 14–25, 16–14, 24–28, 22–14
Pts: Varda 18; Rebs: Jokić 9 Asts: Miljenović 11		Pts: Milosavljević 22; Rebs: Kinsey 10; Asts: Bogdanović 7

Sports Hall Smederevo
Smederevo, Serbia
Attendance: 2,500
Referees: Marko Juras (SRB), Branislav Mrdak (SRB), Miloš Koljenšić (MNE).

12 January 2014
19:30

Report

Partizan NIS (Serbia)	80–67	(Slovenia) Krka
Scoring by quarter: 23–18, 22–21, 24–14, 11–14
Pts: Kinsey 17; Rebs: Lauvergne 6 Asts: Lauvergne, Tepić 4		Pts: Klobučar 21; Rebs: Bolčina 7 Asts: Bečirović 5

Pionir Hall
Belgrade, Serbia
Attendance: 5,500
Referees: Siniša Herceg (CRO), Tomislav Vovk (CRO), Haris Bjedić (BIH).

20 January 2014
18:00

Report

Zadar (Croatia)	56–64	(Serbia) Partizan NIS
Scoring by quarter: 19–15, 16–11, 17–21, 4–17
Pts: Batur 13; Rebs: Sobin 7 Asts: Prostran 3		Pts: Lauvergne 16; Rebs: Lauvergne, Milosavljević 7 Asts: Bogdanović 4

Krešimir Ćosić Hall
Zadar, Croatia
Attendance: 5,000
Referees: Matej Boltauzer (SLO), Sašo Petek (SLO), Miloš Koljenšić (MNE).

27 January 2014
20:30

Report

Partizan NIS (Serbia)	66–73	(North Macedonia) MZT Skopje Aerodrom
Scoring by quarter: 14–13, 20–18, 18–21, 14–21
Pts: Kinsey 16; Rebs: Lauvergne 8 Asts: Lauvergne, Bogdanović 3		Pts: Gečevski 19; Rebs: Gečevski 13; Asts: Otašević 6

Pionir Hall
Belgrade, Serbia
Attendance: 6,000
Referees: Srdjan Dožai (CRO), Tomislav Vovk (CRO), Bojan Jovanić (BIH).

4 February 2014
19:00

Report

Cibona (Croatia)	80–76	(Serbia) Partizan NIS
Scoring by quarter: 17–18, 25–11, 18–24, 20–23
Pts: Šarić 22; Rebs: Šarić 12; Asts: Blassingame 6		Pts: Bogdanović 32; Rebs: Lauvergne 11; Asts: Bogdanović 5

Dražen Petrović Hall
Zagreb, Croatia
Attendance: 5,200
Referees: Matej Boltauzer (SLO), Damir Javor (SLO), Sašo Petek (SLO).

16 February 2014
17:00

Report

Partizan NIS (Serbia)	63–58	(Bosnia and Herzegovina) Široki Primorka
Scoring by quarter: 18–17, 13–15, 14–9, 18–7
Pts: Pavlović 13; Rebs: Lauvergne 9 Asts: Bogdanović 4		Pts: Buva 19; Rebs: Buva 9 Asts: Jones 3

Pionir Hall
Belgrade, Serbia
Attendance: 6,700
Referees: Siniša Herceg (CRO), Radomir Vojinović (MNE), Alfred Jovović (CRO).

23 February 2014
20:00

Report

Crvena zvezda Telekom (Serbia)	63–57	(Serbia) Partizan NIS
Scoring by quarter: 20–15, 13–14, 12–15, 18–13
Pts: Blažič 19; Rebs: Katić, Marjanović 5 Asts: Jenkins, Blažič 3		Pts: Kinsey 13; Rebs: Lauvergne 12; Asts: Bogdanović 6

Pionir Hall
Belgrade, Serbia
Attendance: 4,425
Referees: Sreten Radović (CRO), Srdjan Dozai (CRO), Matej Boltauzer (SLO).

3 March 2014
20:45

Report

Partizan NIS (Serbia)	82–70	(Serbia) Radnički
Scoring by quarter: 19–17, 20–19, 20–15, 23–19
Pts: Kinsey 19; Rebs: Tepić 9 Asts: Tepić 5		Pts: Lešić 14; Rebs: Lešić, Birčević 7 Asts: Marinović 9

Pionir Hall
Belgrade, Serbia
Attendance: 5,500
Referees: Ilija Belošević (SRB), Petar Obradović (BIH), Haris Bjedić (BIH).

9 March 2014
17:00

Report

Union Olimpija (Slovenia)	66–59	(Serbia) Partizan NIS
Scoring by quarter: 21–9, 21–16, 14–14, 10–20
Pts: Gailius 20; Rebs: Murić 7 Asts: Joksimović 5		Pts: Bogdanović 19; Rebs: Lauvergne 7 Asts: Tepić, Pavlović 2

Stožice
Ljubljana, Slovenia
Attendance: 3,700
Referees: Sreten Radović (CRO), Siniša Herceg (CRO), Josip Radojković (CRO).

16 March 2014
19:00

Szolnoki Olaj forfeit the game

Partizan NIS (Serbia)	20–0	(Hungary) Szolnoki Olaj

Pionir Hall
Belgrade, Serbia

24 March 2014
20:45

Report

Budućnost VOLI (Montenegro)	61–65	(Serbia) Partizan NIS
Scoring by quarter: 17–14, 11–16, 14–16, 19–19
Pts: Ivanović 16; Rebs: Popović 12; Asts: Ivanović 6		Pts: Bogdanović 16; Rebs: Gagić 8 Asts: Bogdanović 5

Morača
Podgorica, Montenegro
Attendance: 5,100
Referees: Saša Pukl (SLO), Srdjan Dozai (CRO), Damir Javor (SLO).

31 March 2014
20:45

Report

Partizan NIS (Serbia)	77–68	(Croatia) Cedevita
Scoring by quarter: 20–14, 22–15, 19–16, 16–23
Pts: Bertāns 14; Rebs: Tepić 8 Asts: Pavlović, Bogdanović 5		Pts: Nurkić 15; Rebs: Nurkić 8 Asts: Babić 6

Pionir Hall
Belgrade, Serbia
Attendance: 5,500
Referees: Saša Pukl (SLO), Matej Boltauzer (SLO), Sašo Petek (SLO).

=== Semifinals ===
25 April 2014	Cedevita (Croatia)	81–79	(Serbia) Partizan	Belgrade
20:00	Scoring by quarter: 27–16, 13–19, 17–29, 24–15
	Pts: Bilan 14; Rebs: Suton 11; Asts: Babić 8	Report	Pts: Pavlović 25; Rebs: Bogdanović 7 Asts: Tepić 4	Arena: Kombank Arena; Attendance: 14,210; Referees: Saša Pukl (SLO), Matej Boltauzer (SLO), Sašo Petek (SLO)

== Euroleague ==
=== Regular season ===
==== Standings ====
Group A

	Team	Pld	W	L	PF	PA	Diff	Tie-break
1.	(Turkey) Fenerbahçe Ülker	10	8	2	849	749	+100	
2.	(Russia) CSKA Moscow	10	7	3	732	676	+56	1:1 +5
3.	(Spain) FC Barcelona	10	7	3	786	736	+50	1:1 −5
4.	(Serbia) Partizan	10	3	7	668	715	–47	1:1 +29
5.	(France) JSF Nanterre	10	3	7	682	752	–70	1:1 −29
6.	(Ukraine) Budivelnyk	10	2	8	737	832	–95	

17 October 2013 1	FC Barcelona (Spain)	67–60	(Serbia) Partizan	Barcelona
21:00	Scoring by quarter: 17–18, 11–8, 17–14, 22–20
	Pts: Papanikolaou, Tomić 13; Rebs: Dorsey 10; Asts: Huertas 10	Report	Pts: Milosavljević 15; Rebs: Lauvergne 13; Asts: Westermann 3	Arena: Palau Blaugrana; Attendance: 4,850; Referees: Tolga Sahin (ITA), Anastasios Piloidis (GRE), Marcin Kowalski (POL)

25 October 2013 2	Partizan (Serbia)	73–43	(France) JSF Nanterre	Belgrade
19:00	Scoring by quarter: 21–16, 16–7, 16–15, 20–5
	Pts: Milosavljević 26; Rebs: Lauvergne 11; Asts: Bogdanović 5	Report	Pts: Jaiteh 8 Rebs: Daniels 7 Asts: Meacham 5	Arena: Pionir Hall; Attendance: 7,500; Referees: Juan Carlos Arteaga (ESP), Roberto Chiari (ITA), Jurgis Laurinavicius (LTU)

31 October 2013 3	Budivelnyk (Ukraine)	74–69	(Serbia) Partizan	Kyiv
18:00	Scoring by quarter: 17–17, 27–25, 8–11, 22–16
	Pts: Lavrinovič 22; Rebs: Lavrinovič 8 Asts: Ahearn, Strēlnieks 4	Report	Pts: Kinsey 16; Rebs: Lauvergne 11; Asts: four players 2	Arena: Palace of Sports; Attendance: 3,800; Referees: Recep Ankarali (TUR), Spiros Gkontas (GRE), Aare Halliko (FIN)

8 November 2013 4	Partizan (Serbia)	78–88	(Turkey) Fenerbahçe Ülker	Belgrade
20:45	Scoring by quarter: 17–13, 21–17, 19–30, 21–28
	Pts: Lauvergne 20; Rebs: Lauvergne 10; Asts: Milosavljević 3	Report	Pts: Bogdanović 26; Rebs: Preldžič 6 Asts: Preldžič 8	Arena: Pionir Hall; Attendance: 8,000; Referees: Miguel Perez Perez (ESP), Sergiy Zashchuk (UKR), Ioannis Foufis (GRE)

15 November 2013 5	CSKA Moscow (Russia)	88–46	(Serbia) Partizan	Moscow
17:00	Scoring by quarter: 21–10, 21–8, 27–13, 19–15
	Pts: Weems 18; Rebs: three players 4 Asts: Weems 8	Report	Pts: Bogdanović 13; Rebs: Lauvergne 11; Asts: three players 2	Arena: CSKA Universal Sports Hall; Attendance: 5,086; Referees: Antonio Conde (ESP), Joseph Bissang (FRA), Tomas Jasevicius (LTU)

21 November 2013 6	Partizan (Serbia)	64–82	(Spain) FC Barcelona	Belgrade
20:45	Scoring by quarter: 17–11, 15–27, 12–26, 20–18
	Pts: Bogdanović 24; Rebs: Lauvergne 12; Asts: Three players 2	Report	Pts: Abrines 19; Rebs: Tomić 7 Asts: Papanikolaou 5	Arena: Pionir Hall; Attendance: 8,000; Referees: Borys Ryzhyk (UKR), Olegs Latisevs (LAT), Robert Vyklicky (CZE)

28 November 2013 7	JSF Nanterre (France)	62–61	(Serbia) Partizan	Paris
19:00	Scoring by quarter: 17–19, 18–10, 12–18, 15–14
	Pts: Meacham 14; Rebs: Lighty 8 Asts: Foster 3	Report	Pts: Milosavljević 16; Rebs: Musli 6 Asts: Kinsey 4	Arena: Halle Georges Carpentier; Attendance: 4,500; Referees: Christos Christodoulou (GRE), Emilio Perez Pizarro (ESP), Miguel Angel Perez Niz (ESP)

5 December 2013 8	Partizan (Serbia)	76–61	(Ukraine) Budivelnyk	Belgrade
20:45	Scoring by quarter: 17–13, 25–14, 17–10, 17–24
	Pts: Lauvergne 18; Rebs: Lauvergne 8 Asts: Bogdanović 10	Report	Pts: Lavrinovič, Šalenga 11; Rebs: Lavrinovič 6 Asts: three players 2	Arena: Kombank Arena; Attendance: 15,200; Referees: Dani Hierrezuelo (ESP), Murat Biricik (TUR), Elias Koromilas (GRE)

12 December 2013 9	Fenerbahçe Ülker (Turkey)	77–79	(Serbia) Partizan	Istanbul
20:45	Scoring by quarter: 17–30, 20–9, 23–20, 17–20
	Pts: Preldžič 21; Rebs: Preldžič 6 Asts: Preldžič 7	Report	Pts: Kinsey 20; Rebs: Lauvergne, Milosavljević 5 Asts: Bogdanović, Milosavljević 5	Arena: Ülker Sports Arena; Attendance: 11,917; Referees: Jose Martin (ESP), Juan Carlos Arteaga (ESP), Petros Papapetrou (GRE)

19 December 2013 10	Partizan (Serbia)	62–73	(Russia) CSKA Moscow	Belgrade
20:45	'Scoring by quarter: 19–20, 17–23, 13–16, 13'–14
	Pts: Milosavljević 17; Rebs: Kinsey 6 Asts: Bogdanović 6	Report	Pts: Kaun 12; Rebs: Weems 6 Asts: Teodosić 7	Arena: Pionir Hall; Attendance: 8,147; Referees: Dani Hierrezuelo (ESP), Murat Biricik (TUR), Elias Koromilas (GRE)

=== Top 16 ===
==== Standings ====
Group F

	Team	Pld	W	L	Pts	PF	PA	Diff
1.	(Russia) CSKA Moscow	14	12	2	.857	1167	1035	+132
2.	(Spain) Real Madrid	14	11	3	.785	1180	1037	+143
3.	(Israel) Maccabi Tel Aviv	14	8	6	.571	1115	1090	+25
4.	(Turkey) Galatasaray Liv Hospital	14	7	7	.500	1072	1065	+7
5.	(Russia) Lokomotiv Kuban	14	7	7	.500	1081	1098	-17
6.	(Germany) FC Bayern Munich	14	5	9	.357	1040	1102	–62
7.	(Serbia) Partizan	14	4	10	.286	954	1069	–115
8.	(Lithuania) Žalgiris Kaunas	14	2	12	.143	1062	1182	–113

2 January 2014 1	Partizan (Serbia)	64–80	(Spain) Real Madrid	Belgrade
19:00	Scoring by quarter: 17–29, 22–18, 10–11, 15–22
	Pts: Kinsey 17; Rebs: Lauvergne 13; Asts: Bogdanović, Kinsey 3	Report	Pts: Fernández, Rodríguez 16; Rebs: Bourousis 10; Asts: Rodríguez 5	Arena: Kombank Arena; Attendance: 21,374; Referees: Grzegorz Ziemblicki (POL), Recep Ankarali (TUR), Panagiotis Anastopoulos (GRE).

9 January 2014 2	Bayern Munich (Germany)	71–65	(Serbia) Partizan	Munich
20:15	Scoring by quarter: 17–20, 17–22, 18–14, 19–9
	Pts: Bryant 16; Rebs: Bryant 12; Asts: Delaney 5	Report	Pts: Bogdanović 24; Rebs: Kinsey 8 Asts: Bogdanović 5	Arena: Audi Dome; Attendance: 5,510; Referees: Vicente Bulto (ESP), Emilio Perez Pizarro (ESP), Elias Koromilas (GRE).

17 January 2014 3	Partizan (Serbia)	73–72	(Russia) CSKA Moscow	Belgrade
20:45	Scoring by quarter: 15–14, 19–21, 16–15, 23–22
	Pts: Bogdanović 27; Rebs: Lauvergne 8 Asts: Kinsey, Gagić 2	Report	Pts: Krstić 27; Rebs: Krstić 7 Asts: Weems 10	Arena: Kombank Arena; Attendance: 16,523; Referees: José Martin (ESP), Tolga Sahin (ITA), Petros Papapetrou (GRE).

23 January 2014 4	Maccabi Tel Aviv (Israel)	88–67	(Serbia) Partizan	Tel Aviv
20:05	Scoring by quarter: 20–11, 27–8, 21–28, 20–20
	Pts: Tyus 16; Rebs: Tyus 9 Asts: Rice, Ingles 5	Report	Pts: Bogdanović, Kinsey 17; Rebs: Kinsey 8 Asts: Bogdanović 3	Arena: Nokia Arena; Attendance: 10,728; Referees: Dani Hierrezuelo (ESP), Antonio Conde (ESP), Rustu Nuran (TUR).

31 January 2014 5	Partizan (Serbia)	81–87	(Russia) Lokomotiv Kuban	Belgrade
20:45	Scoring by quarter: 18–20, 20–23, 22–20, 21–24
	Pts: Kinsey 32; Rebs: Three players 6 Asts: Bogdanović 5	Report	Pts: Simon 18; Rebs: Hendrix 7 Asts: Kalnietis 5	Arena: Kombank Arena; Attendance: 15,565; Referees: Robert Lottermoser (GER), Joseph Bissang (FRA), Benjamin Jimenez (ESP).

13 February 2014 6	Žalgiris Kaunas (Lithuania)	89–77	(Serbia) Partizan	Kaunas
20:15	Scoring by quarter: 29–16, 29–25, 19–18, 12–18
	Pts: Dentmon 23; Rebs: Jankūnas, Dentmon 5 Asts: Pocius 7	Report	Pts: Bogdanović 24; Rebs: Lauvergne 7 Asts: Bogdanović 5	Arena: Žalgiris Arena; Attendance: 8,150; Referees: Miguel Perez (ESP), Spiros Gkontas (GRE), Carmelo Paternico (ITA).

20 February 2014 7	Partizan (Serbia)	70–78	(Turkey) Galatasaray Liv Hospital	Belgrade
20:45	Scoring by quarter: 26–22, 11–21, 16–19, 17–16
	Pts: Bogdanović 23; Rebs: Lauvergne 15; Asts: Bogdanović 6	Report	Pts: Domercant 18; Rebs: Mensah-Bonsu, Mačvan 7 Asts: Arslan 6	Arena: Kombank Arena; Attendance: 13,552; Referees: Jose Martin (ESP), Juan Carlos Garcia Gonzalez (ESP), Eddie Viator (FRA).

27 February 2014 8	Real Madrid (Spain)	80–57	(Serbia) Partizan	Madrid
21:00	Scoring by quarter: 22–17, 24–10, 15–13, 19–17
	Pts: Llull, Rodríguez 19; Rebs: Bourousis 8 Asts: Fernández 8	Report	Pts: Pavlović, Bogdanović 10; Rebs: Bogdanović 7 Asts: Tepić 4	Arena: Palacio de Deportes; Attendance: 11,298; Referees: Luigi Lamonica (ITA), Nicolas Maestre (FRA), Marcin Kowalski (POL).

6 March 2014 9	Partizan (Serbia)	70–55	(Germany) Bayern Munich	Belgrade
20:45	Scoring by quarter: 19–9, 25–19, 16–17, 10–10
	Pts: Kinsey, Pavlović 21; Rebs: Lauvergne 10; Asts: Tepić 5	Report	Pts: Đedović 12; Rebs: Delaney 8 Asts: Delaney, Hamann 3	Arena: Kombank Arena; Attendance: 11,550; Referees: Juan Arteaga (ESP), Paolo Taurino (ITA), Olegs Latisevs (LAT).

13 March 2014 10	CSKA Moscow (Russia)	84–52	(Serbia) Partizan	Moscow
17:00	Scoring by quarter: 16–15, 22–7, 32–19, 14–11
	Pts: Fridzon, Kaun 13; Rebs: Micov 5 Asts: Jackson 5	Report	Pts: Lauvergne 17; Rebs: Lauvergne 5 Asts: Tepic 2	Arena: CSKA Universal Sports Hall; Attendance: 4,523; Referees: Dani Hierrenzuelo (ESP), Elias Koromilas (GRE), Sergiy Zashchuk (UKR).

20 March 2014 11	Partizan (Serbia)	72–70	(Israel) Maccabi Tel Aviv	Belgrade
20:45	Scoring by quarter: 14–23, 17–17, 16–17, 25–13
	Pts: Bogdanović 18; Rebs: Lauvergne 12; Asts: Bogdanović 6	Report	Pts: Tyus 14; Rebs: Tyus 11; Asts: Ohayon 4	Arena: Kombank Arena; Attendance: 13,015; Referees: Borys Ryzhyk (UKR), Tolga Sahin (ITA), Emilio Perez Pizarro (ESP).

28 March 2014 12	Lokomotiv Kuban (Russia)	84–73	(Serbia) Partizan	Krasnodar
17:00	Scoring by quarter: 16–10, 22–20, 25–15, 21–28
	Pts: Brown 18; Rebs: Jasaitis 7 Asts: Kalnietis 8	Report	Pts: Bertāns 20; Rebs: Lauvergne 7 Asts: Bogdanović 5	Arena: Basket-Hall; Attendance: 5,185; Referees: Guerrino Cerebuch (ITA), Joseph Bissang (FRA), Marcin Kowalski (POL).

4 April 2014 13	Partizan (Serbia)	78–67	(Lithuania) Žalgiris	Belgrade
20:45	Scoring by quarter: 24–13, 18–21, 18–15, 18–18
	Pts: Bertāns 17; Rebs: Bertāns 10; Asts: three players 4	Report	Pts: Gudaitis 13; Rebs: Klimavičius 8 Asts: Klimavičius 8	Arena: Kombank Arena; Attendance: 12,505; Referees: Recep Ankarali (TUR), Roberto Chiari (ITA), Panagiotis Anastopoulos (GRE).

11 April 2014 14	Galatasaray Liv Hospital (Turkey)	64–55	(Serbia) Partizan	Istanbul
19:00	Scoring by quarter: 16–13, 24–15, 14–14, 10–13
	Pts: Markoishvili 16; Rebs: Aldemir 7 Asts: Arroyo 7	Report	Pts: three players 11; Rebs: Lauvergne 11; Asts: Bogdanović 4	Arena: Abdi İpekçi Arena; Attendance: 11,470; Referees: Jose Martin (ESP), Carmelo Paternico (ITA), Boris Shulga (UKR).

== Individual awards ==
Euroleague

Rising Star

- (Serbia) Bogdan Bogdanović

Adriatic League

The ideal five

- (Serbia) Bogdan Bogdanović
- (France) Joffrey Lauvergne

MVP of the Round

- (France) Léo Westermann – Round 2
- (United States) Tarence Kinsey – Round 5
- (Serbia) Bogdan Bogdanović – Round 9
- (Serbia) Bogdan Bogdanović – Round 19

Basketball League of Serbia

Finals MVP

- (Serbia) Bogdan Bogdanović

Top scorer

- (Serbia) Bogdan Bogdanović

MVP of the Round

- (France) Joffrey Lauvergne – Round 9

== Statistics ==
=== Adriatic League ===
#	Player	GP	GS	MPG	FG%	3FG%	FT%	RPG	APG	SPG	BPG	PPG	EFF
4	(Serbia) Milenko Tepić	13	6	27.7	40.7	27.6	78.1	4.4	2.1	1.3	0.1	7.6	11.1
5	(Serbia) Petar Aranitović	3	0	1.3	0	0	0	0	0.3	0.3	0	0	-0.3
7	(France) Joffrey Lauvergne	26	25	32.1	49.3	32.1	70.7	7.3	1.3	0.8	0.4	10.8	13.5
8	(Serbia) Aleksandar Pavlović	7	3	24.7	38.8	29.2	75	3.7	2.1	1	1.4	13.4	11.3
9	(France) Léo Westermann	7	6	21.7	58.3	52.9	76.9	3	2.9	1	0	8.7	11.9
10	(France) Boris Dallo	21	2	13.1	34	13.3	78.6	1.4	1.6	0.5	0	2.2	2.5
11	(Serbia) Nikola Milutinov	20	13	16.6	47.1	0	60	2.7	0.3	0.4	0.3	4.4	3.3
12	(Serbia) Dragan Milosavljević	17	17	31.2	41.9	32.6	75.9	3.3	2.6	0.8	0.2	12.4	10.2
13	(Serbia) Bogdan Bogdanović	25	19	31	39.7	34	73.1	4.1	3.8	1.2	0.3	15	15.3
14	(Serbia) Đorđe Gagić	26	1	17	47	0	60.6	3.9	1.1	0.6	0.4	5.2	5.7
15	(Serbia) Dejan Musli	26	13	15.3	52	0	55.6	4.2	0.9	0.6	0.5	6.1	7.7
18	(Serbia) Đoko Šalić	13	0	3.8	66.7	0	0	0.4	0.2	0.2	0.1	0.9	0.5
19	(Serbia) Mihajlo Andrić	21	6	7.6	55.6	66.7	100	0.6	0.6	0.1	0	1.3	1.2
21	(United States) Tarence Kinsey	21	17	30	44.2	36.8	80.4	4.5	2	2	0.4	13	14
33	(Serbia) Nemanja Bezbradica	14	0	4.9	27.3	0	0	0.9	0.2	0	0	0.4	0.4
44	(Latvia) Dāvis Bertāns	3	2	22.3	34.8	33.3	75	2.7	1	0	0.7	10.3	6.3
