= 2012–13 KK Partizan season =

Partizan mt:s Belgrade
2012–13 season
- President: Predrag Danilović
- Head coach: Duško Vujošević
- Basketball League of Serbia: Winner
- Radivoj Korać Cup: Runner-up
- Adriatic League: Winner
- Euroleague: Regular Season
- Scoring leader: Adriatic League: Vladimir Lučić (15.83 ppg); Euroleague: Vladimir Lučić (13.70 ppg)
- Highest home attendance: 7,500 (vs Brose Baskets, 9 November 2012)
- Lowest home attendance: 2,000 (vs MZT Skopje, 9 December 2012)
- Average home attendance: 5,214

In the 2012–13 season, Partizan mt:s Belgrade competed in the Basketball League of Serbia, the Radivoj Korać Cup, the Adriatic League and the Euroleague.

== Players ==
=== Current roster ===
KK Partizan roster
Players
Coaches

Pos.	No.	Nat.	Name	Ht.	Wt.	Age
F/C	7	(France)	Lauvergne, Joffrey	2.11 m (6 ft 11 in)	102 kg (225 lb)	34 – 30 September 1991
C	8	(Serbia)	Milutinov, Nikola	2.12 m (6 ft 11 in)	100 kg (220 lb)	31 – 30 December 1994
G	9	(France)	Westermann, Léo	1.96 m (6 ft 5 in)	96 kg (212 lb)	33 – 24 July 1992
G	10	(Bosnia and Herzegovina)	Gordić, Nemanja	1.92 m (6 ft 4 in)	90 kg (198 lb)	37 – 15 September 1988
F	11	(Serbia)	Lučić, Vladimir (C)	2.02 m (6 ft 8 in)	91 kg (201 lb)	36 – 17 June 1989
G	12	(Serbia)	Milosavljević, Dragan	1.98 m (6 ft 6 in)	91 kg (201 lb)	36 – 11 May 1989
G	13	(Serbia)	Bogdanović, Bogdan	1.98 m (6 ft 6 in)	93 kg (205 lb)	33 – 18 August 1992
C	14	(Serbia)	Gagić, Đorđe	2.10 m (6 ft 11 in)	114 kg (251 lb)	35 – 28 December 1990
C	15	(Serbia)	Musli, Dejan	2.12 m (6 ft 11 in)	102 kg (225 lb)	35 – 3 January 1991
F	17	(Slovakia)	Čekovský, Michal	2.06 m (6 ft 9 in)	90 kg (198 lb)	31 – 17 June 1994
F	22	(Serbia)	Čakarević, Marko	2.00 m (6 ft 7 in)	88 kg (194 lb)	37 – 13 May 1988
F	31	(Serbia)	Đekić, Branislav	2.07 m (6 ft 9 in)	94 kg (207 lb)	34 – 12 August 1991
F	44	(Latvia)	Bertāns, Dāvis	2.08 m (6 ft 10 in)	95 kg (209 lb)	33 – 12 November 1992

Head coach

- (Serbia) Duško Vujošević

Assistant coach(es)

- (Serbia) Velimir Gašić
- (Serbia) Petar Božić
- (Serbia) Miloš Gligorijević
- (Croatia) Đorđe Šijan

Team manager

- (Serbia) Dragan Todorić

Legend

- (C) Team captain
- Injured

- Roster
Updated: 29 March 2013

=== Depth chart ===
Pos.	Starting 5	Bench 1	Bench 2	Reserve
C	Dejan Musli	Đorđe Gagić	Nikola Milutinov
PF	Joffrey Lauvergne	Dāvis Bertāns		Branislav Đekić
SF	Vladimir Lučić	Marko Čakarević		Michal Čekovský
SG	Dragan Milosavljević	Bogdan Bogdanović
PG	Léo Westermann	Nemanja Gordić

=== Roster changes ===
==== In ====
No.	Pos.	Nat.	Name	Age	Moving from	Source
8	C	(Serbia)	Nikola Milutinov	17	(Serbia) Hemofarm Vršac	
6	PG	(France)	Léo Westermann	20	(France) ASVEL Basket	
14	C	(Serbia)	Đorđe Gagić	21	(Serbia) Hemofarm Vršac	
15	C	(Serbia)	Dejan Musli	21	(Spain) Caja Laboral	
32	PF	(United States)	Drew Gordon	22	(United States) New Mexico Lobos	
5	PG	(United States)	Torey Thomas	27	(Russia) Spartak Primorye	
10	PG	(Bosnia and Herzegovina)	Nemanja Gordić	24	(Ukraine) Azovmash	
7	PF	(France)	Joffrey Lauvergne	21	(Spain) Valencia Basket	

==== Out ====
No.	Pos.	Nat.	Name	Age	Moving to	Source
9	C	(Serbia)	Miroslav Raduljica	24	(Ukraine) Azovmash	
15	C	(Serbia)	Raško Katić	31	(Serbia) C.zvezda BG Diva	
25	PF	(Serbia)	Milan Mačvan	22	(Turkey) Galatasaray Medical Park	
5	SG/SF	(Serbia)	Dušan Kecman	34	(France) Chorale Roanne Basket	
10	SG	(Serbia)	Nemanja Jaramaz	21	(Italy) Angelico Biella	
16	SG	(Serbia)	Nikola Pešaković	21	(Serbia) Vojvodina Srbijagas	
5	PG	(United States)	Dominic James	26	(Italy) Trenkwalder Reggio Emilia	
20	PG/SG	(Serbia)	Petar Božić	33	(Serbia) Metalac Valjevo	
4	PG	(Serbia)	Nenad Miljenović	19	(Serbia) Radnički Kragujevac	
12	PF/C	(Serbia)	Ivan Marinković	18	(Serbia) OKK Beograd	
18	C	(Serbia)	Nemanja Bešović	20	Free agent	
5	PG	(United States)	Torey Thomas	27	(Italy) Victoria Libertas Pesaro	
33	SG	(Serbia)	Danilo Anđušić	21	(Italy) Virtus Bologna	
32	PF	(United States)	Drew Gordon	22	Free agent	

=== Statistics ===
Legend
GP	Games played	GS	Games started	MPG	Minutes per game
FG%	Field-goal percentage	3FG%	3-point field-goal percentage	FT%	Free-throw percentage
RPG	Rebounds per game	APG	Assists per game	SPG	Steals per game
BPG	Blocks per game	PPG	Points per game	PIR	PIR per game

==== Adriatic League ====
#	Player	GP	GS	MPG	FG%	3FG%	FT%	RPG	APG	SPG	BPG	PPG	EFF
5	(United States) Torey Thomas	6	3	17.8	38.9	27.3	60.0	2.7	2.5	0.8	0.0	6.2	5.5
7	(France) Joffrey Lauvergne	3	0	4.7	25.0	.0	50.0	0.3	0.0	0.0	0.0	1.0	−1.3
8	(Serbia) Nikola Milutinov	18	12	10.4	43.2	0.5	56.3	1.8	0.1	0.2	0.1	2.3	1.5
9	(France) Léo Westermann	18	13	23.7	32.7	18.8	72.0	2.7	2.0	1.2	0.1	6.6	5.3
10	(Bosnia and Herzegovina) Nemanja Gordić	10	2	16.8	43.9	50.0	64.7	1.0	1.6	0.6	0.0	6.7	4.8
11	(Serbia) Vladimir Lučić	15	10	26.6	42.0	32.6	77.4	4.4	0.9	1.5	0.0	11.9	13.7
12	(Serbia) Dragan Milosavljević	18	13	23.1	50.5	35.5	72.5	3.2	1.7	0.5	0.2	7.7	8.7
13	(Serbia) Bogdan Bogdanović	14	5	16.6	33.3	19.4	66.7	2.1	1.4	1.0	0.1	4.6	3.4
14	(Serbia) Đorđe Gagić	16	2	11.8	60.7	.0	58.3	3.0	0.2	0.6	0.3	5.9	3.8
15	(Serbia) Dejan Musli	17	4	17.9	54.8	.0	72.3	5.0	1.2	0.6	1.2	7.4	11.1
22	(Serbia) Marko Čakarević	16	5	5.1	42.9	.0	62.5	1.2	0.3	0.2	0.2	1.1	2.0
31	(Serbia) Branislav Đekić	7	0	9.3	31.3	25.0	80.0	1.0	0.3	0.4	0.1	2.9	2.6
32	(United States) Drew Gordon	18	18	27.1	49.7	10.0	66.7	7.9	1.2	1.2	0.8	10.4	13.3
33	(Serbia) Danilo Anđušić	12	0	10.7	37.0	32.0	87.1	0.8	1.1	0.4	0.1	5.8	5.2
44	(Latvia) Dāvis Bertāns	18	3	22.1	47.8	44.9	69.6	2.6	0.8	0.9	0.4	8.6	7.7

==== Euroleague ====
#	Player	GP	GS	MPG	FG%	3FG%	FT%	RPG	APG	SPG	BPG	PPG	EFF
5	(United States) Torey Thomas	4	2	15.20	.300	.0	.1000	0.3	2.3	0.3	0.0	2.0	−1.0
8	(Serbia) Nikola Milutinov	8	1	7.29	.556	.0	.750	1.4	0.1	0.1	0.3	3.3	2.9
9	(France) Léo Westermann	9	7	28.56	.367	.433	.846	2.6	4.1	0.3	0.0	9.6	6.6
10	(Bosnia and Herzegovina) Nemanja Gordić	5	1	11.15	.462	.143	.0	2.0	0.6	0.4	0.0	3.0	−1.0
11	(Serbia) Vladimir Lučić	10	9	33.14	.451	.323	.796	4.8	0.8	1.6	0.2	13.7	14.9
12	(Serbia) Dragan Milosavljević	10	7	26.31	.638	.273	.724	2.8	1.2	0.9	0.4	9.9	9.2
13	(Serbia) Bogdan Bogdanović	6	3	17.34	.348	.200	.800	1.8	1.0	0.7	0.0	5.0	3.7
14	(Serbia) Đorđe Gagić	10	2	14.07	.485	.0	.735	3.3	0.3	0.2	0.1	5.7	5.4
15	(Serbia) Dejan Musli	10	8	21.38	.527	.0	.773	4.9	1.0	0.8	0.4	9.5	9.8
22	(Serbia) Marko Čakarević	7	0	3.53	.0	.1000	.1000	0.6	0.1	0.1	0.0	0.7	0.4
31	(Serbia) Branislav Đekić	2	0	2.50	.0	.0	.0	0.5	0.0	0.0	0.0	0.0	0.0
32	(United States) Drew Gordon	10	9	28.48	.473	.111	.621	7.5	1.5	1.1	1.1	9.1	12.8
33	(Serbia) Danilo Anđušić	7	0	7.52	.444	.143	.1000	0.6	0.7	0.3	0.0	2.3	1.0
44	(Latvia) Dāvis Bertāns	10	1	20.01	.222	.471	.625	2.3	0.7	1.1	0.2	6.6	4.6

Updated: 14 December 2012

== Competitions ==
	Competition	Position	Record
(Serbia)	Basketball League of Serbia	Winners	17–3
(Serbia)	Radivoj Korać Cup	Runners-up	2–1
(European Union)	Adriatic League	Winners	18–10
(European Union)	Euroleague	Regular season	2–8

== Basketball League of Serbia ==
=== Semifinals ===
28 May 2013	Partizan Belgrade	79–54 (Series: 1–0)	Vojvodina Srbijagas	Belgrade
19:00	Scoring by quarter: 21–18, 19–11, 23–12, 16–13
	Pts: Bertāns 22; Rebs: Musli 11; Asts: Lauvergne 6		Pts: Marković 11; Rebs: Marković 8 Asts: Boltić 5	Arena: Pionir Hall; Attendance: 3,000; Referees: Belošević Ilija, Nikolić Uroš, Stefanović Ivan

30 May 2013	Vojvodina Srbijagas	61–82 (Series: 0–2)	Partizan Belgrade	Novi Sad
21:00	Scoring by quarter: 13–29, 16–17, 14–18, 18–18
	Pts: Zeković 16; Rebs: Marković 8 Asts: Čović 5		Pts: Lauvergne 20; Rebs: Lauvergne 11; Asts: Six players 2	Arena: SC Slana Bara; Attendance: 1,300; Referees: Maričić Saša, Jevtović Vladimir, Obrknežević Uroš

=== Final ===
5 June 2013	Partizan Belgrade	82–54 (Series: 1–0)	Crvena zvezda	Belgrade
21:00	Scoring by quarter: 23–16, 20–12, 17–20, 22–6
	Pts: Milosavljević 28; Rebs: Lauvergne 8 Asts: Westermann, Gordić 3		Pts: Katić 19; Rebs: Katić, Nelson 5 Asts: Lazić 2	Arena: Pionir Hall; Attendance: 5,500; Referees: Nešković Dragan, Maričić Saša, Nikolić Uroš

7 June 2013	Crvena zvezda	69–71 (Series: 0–2)	Partizan Belgrade	Belgrade
19:00	Scoring by quarter: 22–16, 21–17, 11–19, 15–19
	Pts: Simonović, Katić 17; Rebs: Savović 10; Asts: Nelson 8		Pts: Bertāns 13; Rebs: Bertāns 6 Asts: Milosavljević 4	Arena: Pionir Hall; Attendance: 5,500; Referees: Belošević Ilija, Jovčić Milivoje, Obrknežević Uroš

10 June 2013	Partizan Belgrade	74–81 (Series: 2–1)	Crvena zvezda	Belgrade
19:00	Scoring by quarter: 24–20, 15–19, 22–21, 13–21
	Pts: Lučić 26; Rebs: Lauvergne 7 Asts: Musli 3		Pts: Rakočević 18; Rebs: Scott 9 Asts: Katić, Radivojević 3	Arena: Pionir Hall; Attendance: 6,000; Referees: Vojinović Milija, Juras Marko, Jevtović Vladimir

12 June 2013	Crvena zvezda	52–68 (Series: 1–3)	Partizan Belgrade	Belgrade
20:00	Scoring by quarter: 11–15, 10–19, 12–16, 19–18
	Pts: Nelson 12; Rebs: Scott 5 Asts: Radivojević 4		Pts: Bogdanović 17; Rebs: Lauvergne 11; Asts: Westermann 4	Arena: Pionir Hall; Attendance: 6,500; Referees: Belošević Ilija, Maričić Saša, Nikolić Uroš

== Radivoj Korać Cup ==
Quarterfinals

7 February 2013	Partizan	73–50	Sloboda	Kragujevac
21:00 CET	Scoring by quarter: 23–13, 16–11, 21–11, 13–15
	Pts: Westermann, Gordon 11; Rebs: Musli 8 Asts: Milosavljević 4	Report	Pts: Arnautović 11; Rebs: Stefanović, Ljubojević 5 Asts: Vasić 4	Arena: Hala Jezero; Attendance: 1,000; Referees: Časlav Čukalović, Marko Pecelj, Radoš Arsenijević

Semifinals

9 February 2013	Mega Vizura	77–87	Partizan	Kragujevac
17:00 CET	Scoring by quarter: 21–21, 19–18, 19–21, 18–27
	Pts: Micić 23; Rebs: Marjanović 13; Asts: Micić 7	Report	Pts: Gagić 21; Rebs: Gordon 10; Asts: Milosavljević 4	Arena: Hala Jezero; Attendance: 1,500; Referees: Milija Vojinović, Dragan Nešković, Marko Juras

Final

10 February 2013	Partizan	69–78	Crvena zvezda	Kragujevac
21:00 CET	Scoring by quarter: 22–25, 16–16, 11–8, 20–29
	Pts: Lučić 17; Rebs: Musli 14; Asts: Westermann 5	Report	Pts: Rakočević, Scott 20; Rebs: Savović 10; Asts: Katić, Rakočević 4	Arena: Hala Jezero; Attendance: 4,000; Referees: Ilija Belošević, Milija Vojinović, Saša Maričić

== Adriatic League ==
=== Standings ===
	Team	Pld	W	L	PF	PA	Diff	Points
1	(Bosnia and Herzegovina) Igokea	26	20	6	2013	1857	+156	46
2	(Serbia) Crvena zvezda Telekom	26	18	8	2097	1889	+208	44
3	(Serbia) Radnički	26	17	9	2102	1978	+124	43
4	(Serbia) Partizan	26	16	10	1905	1832	+73	42

Qualified for Final four
Relegated

Pld – Played; W – Won; L – Lost; PF – Points for; PA – Points against; Diff – Difference; Pts – Points.

As of 24 March 2013

=== Regular season ===
28 September 2012 1	Partizan (Serbia)	81–74	(Croatia) Zadar	Belgrade
20:00	Scoring by quarter: 21–24, 15–14, 11–15, 34–21
	Pts: Thomas, Musli, Anđušić 12; Rebs: Gordon 10; Asts: Thomas 6	Report	Pts: Travis 18; Rebs: Travis 9 Asts: Prostran 5	Arena: Pionir Hall; Attendance: 5,000; Referees: Vojinović Radomir, Petek Sašo, Dragojević Igor

3 October 2012 2	Partizan (Serbia)	79–60	(Slovenia) Krka	Belgrade
18:00	Scoring by quarter: 23–18, 18–10, 21–18, 17–14
	Pts: Musli 15; Rebs: Gordon 10; Asts: Thomas, Westermann 3	Report	Pts: Murić 16; Rebs: Murić, Pavič 3 Asts: Vladović 3	Arena: Pionir Hall; Attendance: 4,000; Referees: Dozai Srdjan, Herceg Siniša, Vovk Tomislav

6 October 2012 3	Cibona (Croatia)	80–72	(Serbia) Partizan	Zagreb
17:00	Scoring by quarter: 22–18, 24–24, 16–12, 18–18
	Pts: Žižić 20; Rebs: Žižić 8 Asts: Strawberry 4	Report	Pts: Lučić 25; Rebs: Musli 10; Asts: Anđušić, Bertāns 2	Arena: Dražen Petrović Hall; Attendance: 2,000; Referees: Pukl Sašo, Boltauzer Matej, Obradović Petar

14 October 2012 4	Partizan (Serbia)	65–62	(Bosnia and Herzegovina) Široki	Belgrade
19:00	Scoring by quarter: 18–16, 14–19, 13–6, 20–21
	Pts: Lučić, Gordon 16; Rebs: Gordon 7 Asts: Musli 3	Report	Pts: Planinić 14; Rebs: Šakić 8 Asts: Vragović 3	Arena: Pionir Hall; Attendance: 3,000; Referees: Muhvić Dubravko, Jersan Andrej, Hordov Tomislav

21 October 2012 5	Budućnost (Montenegro)	62–81	(Serbia) Partizan	Podgorica
20:00	Scoring by quarter: 9–22, 22–20, 14–21, 17–18
	Pts: Popović 16; Rebs: Lee 7 Asts: Popović 4	Report	Pts: Lučić 18; Rebs: Musli 8 Asts: Westermann 5	Arena: Morača Sports Center; Attendance: 4,300; Referees: Dozai Srdjan, Boltauzer Matej, Vovk Tomislav

28 October 2012 6	Partizan (Serbia)	91–80	(Serbia) Radnički Kragujevac	Belgrade
19:00	Scoring by quarter: 25–16, 21–19, 22–19, 23–26
	Pts: Lučić 22; Rebs: Gordon 11; Asts: Westermann, Gordon 3	Report	Pts: White, Worthington 15; Rebs: Bryan-Amaning 5 Asts: Ćapin 4	Arena: Pionir Hall; Attendance: 5,500; Referees: Javor Davor, Nešković Dragan, Milojević Aleksandar

4 November 2012 7	Split (Croatia)	72–79	(Serbia) Partizan	Split
17:00	Scoring by quarter: 17–19, 16–18, 13–20, 26–22
	Pts: Mimica, Dijan 12; Rebs: Vujčić, Dijan 6 Asts: Vujčić 4	Report	Pts: Anđušić 21; Rebs: Gordon 12; Asts: Lučić 3	Arena: Arena Gripe; Attendance: 3,000; Referees: Boltauzer Matej, Petek Sašo, Vučković Marko

11 November 2012 8	Partizan (Serbia)	78–92	(Serbia) Crvena zvezda	Belgrade
21:00	Scoring by quarter: 22–28, 17–25, 14–19, 25–20
	Pts: Bertans 23; Rebs: Westermann, Lučić 5 Asts: Westermann 5	Report	Pts: Nelson 20; Rebs: Savović 10; Asts: Radivojević 6	Arena: Pionir Hall; Attendance: 5,000; Referees: Pukl Sašo, Radović Sreten, Vojinović Milija

19 November 2012 9	Union Olimpija (Slovenia)	82–86	(Serbia) Partizan	Ljubljana
20:30	Scoring by quarter: 19–21, 19–27, 25–16, 19–22
	Pts: Blažič 22; Rebs: Baynes 7 Asts: Rannikko 4	Report	Pts: Lučić 13; Rebs: Gordon 7 Asts: Milosavljević, Anđušić 3	Arena: Arena Stožice; Attendance: 4,700; Referees: Dožai Srdjan, Vojinović Radomir, Vovk Tomislav

25 November 2012 10	Partizan (Serbia)	58–55	(Croatia) Cedevita	Belgrade
17:00	Scoring by quarter: 11–14, 13–14, 13–10, 21–17
	Pts: Milosavljević, Gordon 10; Rebs: Gordon 6 Asts: Three players 3	Report	Pts: Andrić 13; Rebs: Andrić 7 Asts: Wright 2	Arena: Pionir Hall; Attendance: 6,000; Referees: Boltauzer Matej, Javor Damir, Rutesic Zdravko

2 December 2012 11	Igokea (Bosnia and Herzegovina)	73–50	(Serbia) Partizan	Laktaši
20:30	Scoring by quarter: 18–14, 15–7, 22–12, 18–17
	Pts: Brkić 17; Rebs: Jorović 11; Asts: Joksimović, Hammonds 5	Report	Pts: Musli 10; Rebs: Gordon 9 Asts: Bogdanović 3	Arena: Laktaši Sports Hall; Attendance: 3,700; Referees: Muhvić Dubravko, Dožai Srdjan, Hordov Tomislav

9 December 2012 12	Partizan (Serbia)	68–58	(North Macedonia) MZT Skopje	Belgrade
19:00	Scoring by quarter: 15–12, 14–13, 25–19, 14–14
	Pts: Gordon 15; Rebs: Gordon 16; Asts: Milosavljević 3	Report	Pts: Stojanovski 15; Rebs: Čekovski 7 Asts: Otašević 4	Arena: Pionir Hall; Attendance: 2,000; Referees: Obradović Petar, Rutesić Zdravko, Zurapović Ademir

16 December 2012 13	Szolnoki Olaj (Hungary)	70–68	(Serbia) Partizan	Szolnok
17:00	Scoring by quarter: 26–17, 21–18, 7–17, 16–16
	Pts: Bader 18; Rebs: Bader, Kalve 7 Asts: Šehović, Simon 5	Report	Pts: Gordon 20; Rebs: Gordon 13; Asts: Musli 3	Arena: Tiszaligeti Sportcsarnok; Attendance: 1,442; Referees: Muhvić Dubravko, Anzulović Tonci, Jovović Alfred

19 December 2012 14	Zadar (Croatia)	80–78	(Serbia) Partizan	Zadar
20:00	Scoring by quarter: 20–18, 17–21, 19–20, 24–19
	Pts: Krasić 14; Rebs: Travis 7 Asts: Three players 3	Report	Pts: Lučić 15; Rebs: Lučić 10; Asts: Gordić 3	Arena: Krešimir Ćosić Hall; Attendance: 7,500; Referees: Pukl Sašo, Boltauzer Matej, Jersan Andrej

22 December 2012 15	Krka (Slovenia)	58–66	(Serbia) Partizan	Novo Mesto
17:00	Scoring by quarter: 9–18, 19–11, 13–11, 17–26
	Pts: Klobučar 20; Rebs: Lalić 8 Asts: Lalić, Vladović 2	Report	Pts: Gordon, Milosavljević 13; Rebs: Milosavljević 11; Asts: Four players 2	Arena: Leon Štukelj Hall; Attendance: 1,200; Referees: Herceg Siniša, Obradović Petar, Vovk Tomislav

5 January 2013 16	Partizan (Serbia)	74–68	(Croatia) Cibona	Belgrade
21:00	Scoring by quarter: 17–14, 23–22, 11–15, 23–17
	Pts: Milosavljević 15; Rebs: Gordon 7 Asts: Three players 2	Report	Pts: Strawberry 19; Rebs: Strawberry 7 Asts: Parker 4	Arena: Pionir Hall; Attendance: 6,000; Referees: Pukl Sašo, Petek Sašo, Vucković Marko

12 January 2013 17	Široki (Bosnia and Herzegovina)	87–80	(Serbia) Partizan	Široki Brijeg
19:00	Scoring by quarter: 28–15, 15–28, 21–12, 23–25
	Pts: Šutalo 21; Rebs: Ramljak 8 Asts: Jones 7	Report	Pts: Bogdanović 12; Rebs: Gordon 6 Asts: Milosavljević 6	Arena: Pecara; Attendance: 4,000; Referees: Radović Sreten, Dožai Srdjan, Jersan Andrej

19 January 2013 18	Partizan (Serbia)	63–50	(Montenegro) Budućnost	Belgrade
21:00	Scoring by quarter: 18–11, 20–10, 11–14, 14–15
	Pts: Lučić 12; Rebs: Musli 8 Asts: Westermann 4	Report	Pts: Popović 16; Rebs: Vitkovac 5 Asts: Popović 2	Arena: Pionir Hall; Attendance: 6,000; Referees: Pukl Sašo, Javor Damir, Zurapović Ademir

28 January 2013 19	Radnički Kragujevac (Serbia)	78–76	(Serbia) Partizan	Kragujevac
20:30	Scoring by quarter: 14–18, 18–11, 25–22, 21–25
	Pts: Ćapin 23; Rebs: White 6 Asts: Ćapin 6	Report	Pts: Lučić 20; Rebs: Gordon 7 Asts: Westermann 3	Arena: Hala Jezero; Attendance: 5,000; Referees: Belosević Ilija, Boltauzer Matej, Vovk Tomislav

2 February 2013 20	Partizan (Serbia)	68–59	(Croatia) Split	Belgrade
19:00	Scoring by quarter: 17–17, 15–5, 17–20, 19–17
	Pts: Lučić 16; Rebs: Gordon 9 Asts: Westermann 4	Report	Pts: Subotić 18; Rebs: Sobin 8 Asts: Subotić 7	Arena: Pionir Hall; Attendance: 5,000; Referees: Rutesić Zdravko, Lovsin Andrej, Jeršan Andrej

17 February 2013 21	Crvena zvezda (Serbia)	84–76	(Serbia) Partizan	Belgrade
21:00	Scoring by quarter: 23–24, 14–22, 23–11, 24–19
	Pts: Rakočević, Katić 20; Rebs: Savović 8 Asts: Rakočević 6	Report	Pts: Bertāns 23; Rebs: Lauvergne 6 Asts: Westermann 6	Arena: Pionir Hall; Attendance: 5,500; Referees: Pukl Saso, Dozai Srdjan, Herceg Sinisa

23 February 2013 22	Partizan (Serbia)	71–73	(Slovenia) Union Olimpija	Belgrade
20:00	Scoring by quarter: 17–14, 20–28, 26–17, 8–14
	Pts: Lauvergne 17; Rebs: Lauvergne 10; Asts: Three players 2	Report	Pts: Salin 13; Rebs: Omić 8 Asts: Prepelič 3	Arena: Pionir Hall; Attendance: 6,000; Referees: Muhvić Dubravko, Obradović Petar, Rutesić Zdravko

3 March 2013 23	Cedevita (Croatia)	76–77	(Serbia) Partizan	Zagreb
17:00	Scoring by quarter: 14–10, 21–16, 19–22, 22–29
	Pts: Tomas 26; Rebs: Bilan 10; Asts: Wright 4	Report	Pts: Bertāns, Lučić 18; Rebs: Lučić, Gagić 5 Asts: Westermann 4	Arena: Dom Sportova; Attendance: 2,700; Referees: Pukl Sašo, Javor Damir, Vojinović Radomir

10 March 2013 24	Partizan (Serbia)	73–64	(Bosnia and Herzegovina) Igokea	Belgrade
17:00	Scoring by quarter: 13–17, 25–13, 20–18, 15–16
	Pts: Lučić 13; Rebs: Lauvergne, Gagić 7 Asts: Gagić 4	Report	Pts: Jorović 15; Rebs: Jorović 7 Asts: Joksimović 5	Arena: Pionir Hall; Attendance: 6,500; Referees: Radović Sreten, Herceg Siniša, Milojević Aleksandar

16 March 2013 25	MZT Skopje (North Macedonia)	66–64	(Serbia) Partizan	Skopje
19:00	Scoring by quarter: 19–17, 11–14, 19–16, 17–17
	Pts: Čekovski 21; Rebs: Čekovski 7 Asts: Stojanovski 5	Report	Pts: Gordon 18; Rebs: Gordon 14; Asts: Gordić 4	Arena: Boris Trajkovski Sports Center; Attendance: 7,000; Referees: Javor Damir, Obradović Petar, Vučković Marko

23 March 2013 26	Partizan (Serbia)	83–69	(Hungary) Szolnoki Olaj	Belgrade
20:00	Scoring by quarter: 21–17, 18–13, 22–24, 22–15
	Pts: Lučić 16; Rebs: Gordon 9 Asts: Gordić 3	Report	Pts: Šehović, Florence 16; Rebs: Šehović, Bader 6 Asts: Šehović 3	Arena: Pionir Hall; Attendance: 7,000; Referees: Herceg Siniša, Anzulović Tonci, Bijedić Haris

=== Semifinal ===
25 April 2013 Semifinal	Igokea (Bosnia and Herzegovina)	57–63	(Serbia) Partizan	Laktaši
21:00	Scoring by quarter: 15–17, 10–6, 15–18, 17–22
	Pts: Edwards 19; Rebs: Edwards 11; Asts: Joksimović 4	Boxscore	Pts: Lauvergne 12; Rebs: Bertāns, Musli 6 Asts: Westermann 4	Arena: Laktaši Sports Hall; Attendance: 3,000; Referees: Pukl Sašo, Boltauzer Matej, Javor Damir

=== Final ===
27 April 2013 Final	Partizan (Serbia)	71–63	(Serbia) Crvena zvezda	Laktaši
	Scoring by quarter: 14–18, 11–14, 25–13, 21–18
	Pts: Westermann, Bertāns 15; Rebs: Lauvergne, Gagić 6 Asts: Westermann 3	Boxscore	Pts: Katić 19; Rebs: Katić 12; Asts: Rakočević, Nelson 3	Arena: Laktaši Sports Hall; Attendance: 3,000; Referees: Pukl Sašo, Belošević Ilija, Boltauzer Matej

== Euroleague ==
=== Standings ===
Key to colors
Top four places in each group advance to Top 16

	Team	Pld	W	L	PF	PA	Diff	Tie-break
1.	(Spain) FC Barcelona Regal	10	9	1	774	636	+138	1–1 (+18)
2.	(Russia) CSKA Moscow	10	9	1	783	709	+74	1–1 (−18)
3.	(Turkey) Beşiktaş JK İstanbul	10	5	5	699	749	−50	
4.	(Germany) Brose Baskets Bamberg	10	3	7	740	807	−67	
5.	(Lithuania) Lietuvos Rytas	10	2	8	670	724	−54	1–1 (+7)
6.	(Serbia) Partizan	10	2	8	731	772	−41	1–1 (−7)

=== Regular season ===
12 October 2012 1	Beşiktaş (Turkey)	81–65	(Serbia) Partizan	Istanbul
19:00	Scoring by quarter: 19–14, 20–16, 22–23, 20–12
	Pts: Christopher 25; Rebs: Falker 5 Asts: Güler 4	Report	Pts: Lučić 18; Rebs: Milosavljević, Gagić 6 Asts: Westermann 3	Arena: Abdi İpekçi Arena; Attendance: 6,100; Referees: Borys Ryzhyk (UKR), Apostolos Kalpakas (SWE), Oscar Perea (ESP)

18 October 2012 2	Partizan (Serbia)	71–76(OT)	(Russia) CSKA Moscow	Belgrade
20:45	Scoring by quarter: 13–14, 18–25, 15–10, 16–13, Overtime: 9–14
	Pts: Bogdanović 16; Rebs: Musli 10; Asts: Westermann 4	Report	Pts: Weems 30; Rebs: Khryapa 8 Asts: Khryapa 3	Arena: Pionir Hall; Attendance: 6,500; Referees: Juan Carlos Arteaga (ESP), Fernando Rocha (POR), Ioannis Foufis (GRE)

25 October 2012 3	Lietuvos Rytas (Lithuania)	69–61	(Serbia) Partizan	Vilnius
18:30	Scoring by quarter: 23–20, 17–11, 15–17, 14–13
	Pts: Samardžiski, Seibutis 14; Rebs: Ivanov 6 Asts: Seibutis 3	Report	Pts: Lučić 17; Rebs: Gordon 7 Asts: Thomas, Westermann 2	Arena: Siemens Arena; Attendance: 4,250; Referees: Miguel Perez Perez (ESP), Eddie Viator (FRA), Tomas Trawicki (POL)

1 November 2012 4	FC Barcelona Regal (Spain)	85–82	(Serbia) Partizan	Barcelona
20:45	Scoring by quarter: 23–15, 14–22, 30–18, 18–27
	Pts: Huertas 24; Rebs: Three players 5 Asts: Huertas 9	Report	Pts: Bertans 17; Rebs: Gordon 7 Asts: Thomas 4	Arena: Palau Blaugrana; Attendance: 5,713; Referees: Tolga Sahin (ITA), Elias Koromilas (GRE), Renaud Geller (BEL)

9 November 2012 5	Partizan (Serbia)	72–77	(Germany) Brose Baskets	Belgrade
20:45	Scoring by quarter: 16–16, 25–17, 21–22, 10–22
	Pts: Lučić, Gagić 17; Rebs: Gordon 8 Asts: Westermann 3	Report	Pts: Nachbar 19; Rebs: Ford 9 Asts: Gavel 4	Arena: Pionir Hall; Attendance: 7,500; Referees: Paolo Taurino (ITA), Nicola Maestre (FRA), Marcin Kowalski (POL)

15 November 2012 6	Partizan (Serbia)	87–72	(Turkey) Beşiktaş	Belgrade
20:45	Scoring by quarter: 24–19, 27–24, 19–22, 17–7
	Pts: Milosavljević 17; Rebs: Gordon 9 Asts: Westermann 8	Report	Pts: Jerrells 20; Rebs: Vidmar 10; Asts: Vidmar, Cetin 3	Arena: Pionir Hall; Attendance: 6,500; Referees: Luigi Lamonica (ITA), Gianluca Mattioli (ITA), Sergiy Zashchuck (UKR)

22 November 2012 7	CSKA Moscow (Russia)	78–61	(Serbia) Partizan	Moscow
17:00	Scoring by quarter: 23–22, 25–14, 13–12, 17–13
	Pts: Weems 14; Rebs: Kaun 6 Asts: Teodosić 11	Report	Pts: Lučić, Milosavljević 12; Rebs: Musli 6 Asts: Musli 3	Arena: Megasport Arena; Attendance: 8,162; Referees: Marek Cmikiewicz (POL), Rustu Nuran (TUR), Omer Esteron (TUR)

29 November 2012 8	Partizan (Serbia)	75–74	(Lithuania) Lietuvos Rytas	Belgrade
20:45	Scoring by quarter: 18–11, 21–22, 20–18, 16–23
	Pts: Bertans 14; Rebs: Gordon, Lučić 8 Asts: Westermann 5	Report	Pts: Nedović 16; Rebs: Ivanov, Katelynas 5 Asts: Radošević 4	Arena: Pionir Hall; Attendance: 7,500; Referees: Jose Martin (ESP), Robert Vyklicky (CZE), Panagiotis Anastopoulos (GRE)

6 December 2012 9	Partizan (Serbia)	67–68(OT)	(Spain) FC Barcelona Regal	Belgrade
20:45	Scoring by quarter: 14–13, 16–12, 14–18, 14–15, Overtime: 9–10
	Pts: Milosavljević 14; Rebs: Gordon 9 Asts: Westermann 5	Report	Pts: Navarro 10; Rebs: Wallace 9 Asts: Jasikevičius, Wallace 2	Arena: Pionir Hall; Attendance: 7,500; Referees: Robert Lottermoser (GER), Jakub Zamojski (POL), Anastasios Piloidis (GRE)

13 December 2012 10	Brose Baskets (Germany)	92–90(OT)	(Serbia) Partizan	Bamberg
20:45	Scoring by quarter: 25–13, 22–22, 21–27, 12–18, Overtime: 12–10
	Pts: Nachbar 23; Rebs: Jacobsen, Zirbes 6 Asts: Jacobsen 6	Report	Pts: Lučić 19; Rebs: Gordon 15; Asts: Westermann 4	Arena: Stechert Arena; Attendance: 6,800; Referees: Guerrino Cerebuch (ITA), Vicente Bulto (ESP), Dani Hierrezuelo

== Individual awards ==
Adriatic League

MVP of the Round

- (Serbia) Vladimir Lučić – Round 4
- (Serbia) Vladimir Lučić – Round 6

Basketball League of Serbia

Finals MVP

- (Serbia) Dragan Milosavljević

MVP of the Round

- (Serbia) Bogdan Bogdanović – Round 1
- (Latvia) Dāvis Bertāns – Round 12
- (Serbia) Dragan Milosavljević – Play off, Round 4
- (Serbia) Vladimir Lučić – Play off, Round 6
- (France) Joffrey Lauvergne – Play off, Round 7
