= 2013–14 Euroleague Regular Season Group A =

Standings and results for Group A of the regular season phase of the 2013–14 Euroleague basketball tournament.

== Standings ==
Key to colors
Top four places advance to Top 16
Bottom two teams enter 2013–14 Eurocup Basketball Last 32 round

Pos	Team	Pld	W	L	PF	PA	PD	Tie
1	(Turkey) Fenerbahçe Ülker	10	8	2	849	749	+100	
2	(Russia) CSKA Moscow	10	7	3	732	676	+56	1–1 (+5)
3	(Spain) FC Barcelona	10	7	3	786	729	+57	1–1 (–5)
4	(Serbia) Partizan	10	3	7	668	715	−47	1–1 (+29)
5	(France) Nanterre	10	3	7	682	753	−71	1–1 (–29)
6	(Ukraine) Budivelnyk	10	2	8	737	832	−95	

== Fixtures and results ==
All times given below are in Central European Time.

=== Game 1 ===
17 October 2013
18:00

Boxscore

Budivelnyk (Ukraine)	84–102	(Turkey) Fenerbahçe Ülker
Scoring by quarter: 15–18, 28–23, 34–30, 7–31
Pts: Lavrinovič 21; Rebs: Lavrinovič, Minard 4 Asts: Minard, Strēlnieks 5		Pts: Bogdanović 21; Rebs: Bjelica, Vidmar 6 Asts: Preldžič 7

Palace of Sports, Kyiv
Attendance: 4,200
Referees: Sreten Radovic (CRO), Carmelo Paternico (ITA), Apostolos Kalpakas (GRE)

17 October 2013
20:45

Boxscore

JSF Nanterre (France)	59–62	(Russia) CSKA Moscow
Scoring by quarter: 20–11, 15–17, 13–22, 11–12
Pts: Daniels 18; Rebs: Passave-Ducteil 8 Asts: Meacham 3		Pts: Kaun 16; Rebs: Kaun 9 Asts: Khryapa 4

Halle Georges Carpentier, Paris
Attendance: 3,000
Referees: Miguel Perez Perez (ESP), Spiros Gkontas (GRE), Damir Javor (SLO)

17 October 2013
21:00

Boxscore

FC Barcelona (Spain)	67–60	(Serbia) Partizan NIS
Scoring by quarter: 17–18, 11–8, 17–14, 22–20
Pts: Papanikolaou, Tomić 13; Rebs: Dorsey 10; Asts: Huertas 10		Pts: Milosavljević 15; Rebs: Lauvergne 13; Asts: Westermann 3

Palau Blaugrana, Barcelona
Attendance: 4,850
Referees: Tolga Sahin (ITA), Anastasios Piloidis (GRE), Marcin Kowalski (POL).

=== Game 2 ===
25 October 2013
18:00

Boxscore

CSKA Moscow (Russia)	72–67	(Ukraine) Budivelnyk
Scoring by quarter: 17–18, 15–9, 17–17, 23–23
Pts: Teodosić 14; Rebs: Hines, Krstić 7 Asts: Teodosić 6		Pts: Downs 23; Rebs: Strēlnieks 5 Asts: Strēlnieks 6

Universal Sports Hall, Moscow
Attendance: 4,311
Referees: Emilio Perez Pizarro (ESP), Andrej Jersan (SLO), Marius Ciulin (ROM)

25 October 2013
19:00

Boxscore

Partizan NIS (Serbia)	73–43	(France) JSF Nanterre
Scoring by quarter: 21–16, 16–7, 16–15, 20–5
Pts: Milosavljević 26; Rebs: Lauvergne 11; Asts: Bogdanović 5		Pts: Jaiteh 8 Rebs: Daniels 7 Asts: Meacham 5

Pionir Hall, Belgrade
Attendance: 7,500
Referees: Juan Carlos Arteaga (ESP), Roberto Chiari (ITA), Jurgis Laurinavicius (LTU)

25 October 2013
19:00

Boxscore

Fenerbahçe Ülker (Turkey)	75–70	(Spain) FC Barcelona
Scoring by quarter: 24–17, 20–18, 22–17, 9–18
Pts: Kleiza 22; Rebs: McCalebb 8 Asts: McCalebb, Preldžič 4		Pts: Navarro 18; Rebs: Tomić 9 Asts: Huertas, Tomić 4

Ülker Sports Arena, Istanbul
Attendance: 12,800
Referees: Luigi Lamonica (ITA), Eddie Viator (FRA), Tomasz Trawicki (POL)

=== Game 3 ===
31 October 2013
18:00

Boxscore

Budivelnyk (Ukraine)	74–69	(Serbia) Partizan NIS
Scoring by quarter: 17–17, 27–25, 8–11, 22–16
Pts: Lavrinovič 22; Rebs: Lavrinovič 8 Asts: Ahearn, Strēlnieks 4		Pts: Kinsey 16; Rebs: Lauvergne 11; Asts: four players 2

Palace of Sports, Kyiv
Attendance: 3,800
Referees: Recep Ankarali (TUR), Spiros Gkontas (GRE), Aare Halliko (FIN)

31 October 2013
20:45

Boxscore

Fenerbahçe Ülker (Turkey)	86–60	(Russia) CSKA Moscow
Scoring by quarter: 26–16, 18–17, 17–14, 25–13
Pts: Bogdanović 23; Rebs: Bjelica 9 Asts: McCalebb, Preldžić 5		Pts: Micov 20; Rebs: Hines 8 Asts: Teodosić 6

Ülker Sports Arena, Istanbul
Attendance: 12,800
Referees: Dani Hierrezuelo (ESP), Matej Boltauzer (SLO), Panagiotis Anastopoulos (GRE)

31 October 2013
20:45

Boxscore

FC Barcelona (Spain)	67–71	(France) JSF Nanterre
Scoring by quarter: 25–15, 14–22, 21–14, 7–20
Pts: Abrines 15; Rebs: Dorsey 11; Asts: three players 3		Pts: Thomas 14; Rebs: Thomas 7 Asts: Meacham 4

Palau Blaugrana, Barcelona
Attendance: 4,079
Referees: Milivoje Jovcic (SRB), Elias Koromilas (GRE), Saso Petek (SLO)

=== Game 4 ===
8 November 2013
20:45

Boxscore

FC Barcelona (Spain)	79–70	(Russia) CSKA Moscow
Scoring by quarter: 18–20, 17–20, 27–14, 17–16
Pts: Navarro 20; Rebs: Dorsey, Tomić 7 Asts: Huertas, Navarro 3		Pts: Micov 14; Rebs: three players 5 Asts: Teodosić 7

Palau Blaugrana, Barcelona
Attendance: 6,102
Referees: Christos Christodoulou (GRE), Robert Lottermoser (GER), Jakub Zamojski (SLO)

8 November 2013
20:45

Boxscore

JSF Nanterre (France)	80–61	(Ukraine) Budivelnyk
Scoring by quarter: 27–8, 24–15, 17–22, 12–16
Pts: Daniels 14; Rebs: Jaiteh 6 Asts: Foster 6		Pts: Summers 12; Rebs: Summers 6 Asts: Downs 2

Halle Georges Carpentier, Paris
Attendance: 4,500
Referees: Juan Carlos Garcia Gonzalez (ESP), Sinisa Herceg (SLO), Gentian Cici (ALB)

8 November 2013
20:45

Boxscore

Partizan NIS (Serbia)	78–88	(Turkey) Fenerbahçe Ülker
Scoring by quarter: 17–13, 21–17, 19–30, 21–28
Pts: Lauvergne 20; Rebs: Lauvergne 10; Asts: Milosavljević 3		Pts: Bogdanović 26; Rebs: Preldžič 6 Asts: Preldžič 8

Pionir Hall, Belgrade
Attendance: 8,000
Referees: Miguel Perez Perez (ESP), Sergiy Zashchuk (UKR), Ioannis Foufis (GRE)

=== Game 5 ===
14 November 2013
19:15

Boxscore

Fenerbahçe Ülker (Turkey)	83–66	(France) JSF Nanterre
Scoring by quarter: 23–19, 21–13, 14–18, 25–16
Pts: Bogdanović 20; Rebs: Vidmar 9 Asts: McCalebb, Preldžič 4		Pts: Traore 20; Rebs: Daniels 5 Asts: Foster 4

Ülker Sports Arena, Istanbul
Attendance: 12,237
Referees: Guerrino Cerebuch (ITA), Sergiy Chebyshev (UKR), Carlos Cortes (ESP)

14 November 2013
20:45

Boxscore

Budivelnyk (Ukraine)	74–84	(Spain) FC Barcelona
Scoring by quarter: 21–24, 27–22, 8–16, 18–22
Pts: Lavrinovič 21; Rebs: Lavrinovič, Summers 7 Asts: Downs, Minard 4		Pts: Tomić 18; Rebs: Lampe 9 Asts: Huertas 8

Palace of Sports, Kyiv
Attendance: 5,600
Referees: Grzegorz Ziemblicki (POL), Panagiotis Anostopoulos (GRE), Rüştü Nuran (TUR)

15 November 2013
17:00

Boxscore

CSKA Moscow (Russia)	88–46	(Serbia) Partizan NIS
Scoring by quarter: 21–10, 21–8, 27–13, 19–15
Pts: Weems 18; Rebs: three players 4 Asts: Weems 8		Pts: Bogdanović 13; Rebs: Lauvergne 11; Asts: three players 2

CSKA Universal Sports Hall, Moscow
Attendance: 5,086
Referees: Antonio Conde (ESP), Joseph Bissang (FRA), Tomas Jasevicius (LTU)

=== Game 6 ===
21 November 2013
17:00

Boxscore

CSKA Moscow (Russia)	72–60	(France) JSF Nanterre
Scoring by quarter: 9–14, 24–12, 26–15, 13–19
Pts: Pargo 14; Rebs: Vorontsevich 7 Asts: Weems 4		Pts: Thomas 18; Rebs: Jaiteh 7 Asts: Lighty, Meacham 3

CSKA Universal Sports Hall, Moscow
Attendance: 4,389
Referees: José Martín (ESP), Paolo Taurino (ITA), Ioannis Foufis (GRE)

21 November 2013
20:45

Boxscore

Partizan NIS (Serbia)	64–82	(Spain) FC Barcelona
Scoring by quarter: 17–11, 15–27, 12–26, 20–18
Pts: Bogdanović 24; Rebs: Lauvergne 12; Asts: Three players 2		Pts: Abrines 19; Rebs: Tomić 7 Asts: Papanikolaou 5

Pionir Hall, Belgrade
Attendance: 8,000
Referees: Borys Ryzhyk (UKR), Olegs Latisevs (LAT), Robert Vyklicky (CZE)

22 November 2013
19:00

Boxscore

Fenerbahçe Ülker (Turkey)	84–68	(Ukraine) Budivelnyk
Scoring by quarter: 27–23, 25–12, 16–16, 16–17
Pts: Bogdanović 20; Rebs: Vidmar 10; Asts: Bjelica 6		Pts: Šalenga 16; Rebs: Tischenko 4 Asts: three players 3

Ülker Sports Arena, Istanbul
Attendance: 12,123
Referees: Juan Carlos Arteaga (ESP), Marek Cmikiewicz (POL), Haris Bijedic (BIH)

=== Game 7 ===
28 November 2013
19:00

Boxscore

JSF Nanterre (France)	62–61	(Serbia) Partizan NIS
Scoring by quarter: 17–19, 18–10, 12–18, 15–14
Pts: Meacham 14; Rebs: Lighty 8 Asts: Foster 3		Pts: Milosavljević 16; Rebs: Musli 6 Asts: Kinsey 4

Halle Georges Carpentier, Paris
Attendance: 4,500
Referees: Christos Christodoulou (GRE), Emilio Perez Pizarro (ESP), Miguel Angel Perez Niz (ESP)

29 November 2013
18:00

Boxscore

Budivelnyk (Ukraine)	74–82	(Russia) CSKA Moscow
Scoring by quarter: 17–18, 18–22, 24–18, 15–24
Pts: Ahearn 21; Rebs: Lavrinovič 9 Asts: Lavrinovič 5		Pts: Hines 18; Rebs: Hines 6 Asts: Teodosić 9

Kyiv Sports Palace, Kyiv
Attendance: 4,700
Referees: Sasa Pukl (SLO), Fernando Rocha (POR), Moritz Reiter (GER)

29 November 2013
21:00

Boxscore

FC Barcelona (Spain)	94–81	(Turkey) Fenerbahçe Ülker
Scoring by quarter: 35-15, 17-25, 22-22, 20-19
Pts: Nachbar 23; Rebs: Nachbar 9 Asts: Tomić 5		Pts: McCalebb 22; Rebs: Bjelica 11; Asts: Bogdanović 5

Palau Blaugrana, Barcelona
Attendance: 5,494
Referees: Spiros Gkontas (GRE), Matej Boltauzer (SLO), Boris Shulga (UKR)

=== Game 8 ===
5 December 2013
20:45

Boxscore

Partizan NIS (Serbia)	76–61	(Ukraine) Budivelnyk
Scoring by quarter: 17–13, 25–14, 17–10, 17–24
Pts: Lauvergne 18; Rebs: Lauvergne 8 Asts: Bogdanović 10		Pts: Lavrinovič, Šalenga 11; Rebs: Lavrinovič 6 Asts: three players 2

Kombank Arena, Belgrade
Attendance: 15,200
Referees: Dani Hierrezuelo (ESP), Murat Biricik (TUR), Elias Koromilas (GRE)

6 December 2013
17:00

Boxscore

CSKA Moscow (Russia)	74–78	(Turkey) Fenerbahçe Ülker
Scoring by quarter: 17–19, 18–22, 24–15, 15–22
Pts: Weems 20; Rebs: Vorontsevich 9 Asts: Teodosić 4		Pts: Bogdanović 18; Rebs: Preldžič 6 Asts: Preldžič 8

CSKA Universal Sports Hall, Moscow
Attendance: 4,914
Referees: Christos Christodoulou (GRE), Olegs Latisevs (LAT), Oscar Perea (ESP)

6 December 2013
20:45

Boxscore

JSF Nanterre (France)	78–82	(Spain) FC Barcelona
Scoring by quarter: 19–17, 18–30, 20–19, 21–16
Pts: Lighty 18; Rebs: Traoré 9 Asts: Meacham 5		Pts: Navarro 15; Rebs: Dorsey 9 Asts: Abrines, Tomić 3

Halle Georges Carpentier, Paris
Attendance: 4,500
Referees: Milivoje Jovcic (SRB), Robert Lottermoser (GER), Carmelo Paternico (ITA)

=== Game 9 ===
12 December 2013
17:00

Boxscore

CSKA Moscow (Russia)	79–65	(Spain) FC Barcelona
Scoring by quarter: 20–21, 22–10, 11–21, 26–13
Pts: Weems 18; Rebs: Vorontsevich 8 Asts: Weems 5		Pts: Oleson 14; Rebs: Tomić 10; Asts: Navarro 5

CSKA Universal Sports Hall, Moscow
Attendance: 5,293
Referees: Sreten Radovic (CRO), Tolga Sahin (ITA), Damir Javor (SLO)

12 December 2013
20:45

Boxscore

Fenerbahçe Ülker (Turkey)	77–79	(Serbia) Partizan NIS
Scoring by quarter: 17-30, 20-9, 23-20, 17-20
Pts: Preldžič 21; Rebs: Preldžič 6 Asts: Preldžič 7		Pts: Kinsey 20; Rebs: Lauvergne, Milosavljević 5 Asts: Bogdanović, Milosavljević 5

Ülker Sports Arena, Istanbul
Attendance: 11,917
Referees: José Martín (ESP), Juan Carlos Arteaga (ESP), Petros Papapetrou (GRE)

13 December 2013
18:00

Boxscore

Budivelnyk (Ukraine)	97–87	(France) JSF Nanterre
Scoring by quarter: 21–19, 29–24, 21–19, 26–25
Pts: Lavrinovič 29; Rebs: Lavrinovič 10; Asts: Minard 7		Pts: Lighty 20; Rebs: Jaiteh 11; Asts: Meacham 10

Kyiv Sports Palace, Kyiv
Attendance: 1,500
Referees: Ilija Belosevic (SRB), Srdan Dozai (CRO), Benjamin Jimenez (ESP)

=== Game 10 ===
19 December 2013
20:45

Boxscore

Partizan NIS (Serbia)	62–73	(Russia) CSKA Moscow
Scoring by quarter: 19-20, 17-23, 13-16, 13-14
Pts: Milosavljević 17; Rebs: Kinsey 6 Asts: Bogdanović 6		Pts: Kaun 12; Rebs: Weems 6 Asts: Teodosić 7

Pionir Hall, Belgrade
Attendance: 8,147
Referees: Robert Lottermoser (GER), Antonio Conde (ESP), Boris Shulga (UKR)

19 December 2013
21:00

Boxscore

FC Barcelona (Spain)	96–77	(Ukraine) Budivelnyk
Scoring by quarter: 25-15, 29-23, 19-24, 23-15
Pts: Lampe 16; Rebs: Tomić 6 Asts: Pullen 8		Pts: Summers 17; Rebs: Summers 8 Asts: Strēlnieks, Minard 4

Palau Blaugrana, Barcelona
Attendance: 3,134
Referees: Guerrino Cerebuch (ITA), Joseph Bissang (FRA), Ioannis Foufis (GRE)

19 December 2013
21:00

Boxscore

JSF Nanterre (France)	76–95	(Turkey) Fenerbahçe Ülker
Scoring by quarter: 21-27, 20-24, 18-22, 17-22
Pts: Thomas 14; Rebs: Lighty 4 Asts: Lighty 5		Pts: Bogdanović 20; Rebs: Bjelica, Žorić 5 Asts: Preldžić 5

Halle Georges Carpentier, Paris
Attendance: 4,500
Referees: José Ramón García Ortiz (ESP), Jakub Zamojski (POL), Panagiotis Anastopoulos (GRE)
