= Toni Dijan =

Croatian basketball player

Zadar
- Title: Assistant coach
- League: ABA League; Croatian League

Personal information
- Born: 17 February 1983 (age 43) Zadar, SR Croatia, SFR Yugoslavia
- Listed height: 6 ft 8.7 in (2.05 m)
- Listed weight: 231 lb (105 kg)

Career information
- NBA draft: 2005: undrafted
- Playing career: 2000–2017
- Position: Small forward
- Coaching career: 2021–present

Career history

Playing
- 2000–2005: Zadar
- 2005–2006: Union Olimpija
- 2007–2008: Široki Prima pivo
- 2008–2010: Zagreb CO
- 2011–2013: Split
- 2013–2014: Zadar
- 2015–2017: Split

Coaching
- 2021–present: Zadar (assistant)

Career highlights
- As player: Adriatic League champion (2003); Croatian League champion (2005); 3× Croatian Cup winner (2003, 2005, 2010); Slovenian Cup winner (2006); Bosnian Cup winner (2008); As assistant coach: 3× Croatian League champion (2023–2025); Croatian Cup winner (2024)
Medals
Men's basketball
Representing Croatia
European U-18 Championship
Silver medal – second place	2000 Croatia	U-18 Team

Toni Dijan (born 17 February 1983) is a Croatian professional basketball coach and former player who is an assistant coach for Zadar. He played the small forward position.

== Playing career ==
Dijan, a native of Sukošan, is a product of the Zadar youth system. He played in the Croatian national youth selections. He won a silver medal together with the Croatian Junior National Team at the 2000 FIBA U-18 European Championship held in Zadar, where he also made the All- Tournament team. His team lost in the finals by just one point against France, led by Tony Parker.

Unfortunately, his senior career, marked with many injuries, did not follow the success of his youth career. He signed his first professional contract with Zadar in 2000 and stayed with the club for the next five years. In this period Zadar won the Adriatic League in 2003 and the Croatian League in 2005, along with two Croatian Cups. In 2005 Dijan moves to the Slovenian Union Olimpija where he spent one season. After spending the 2007–08 season at the Bosnian Široki Prima pivo, he returns to the Croatian League signing with Zagreb in 2008. He spent another two seasons in Split and in the summer of 2013 decided to return to Zadar. He averaged 8.0 pts, 3.5 reb, 1.3 ass in the 2012-13 season of the ABA League.

In January 2015 he joined his former club Split.
