= Tarence Kinsey =

American basketball player (born 1984)

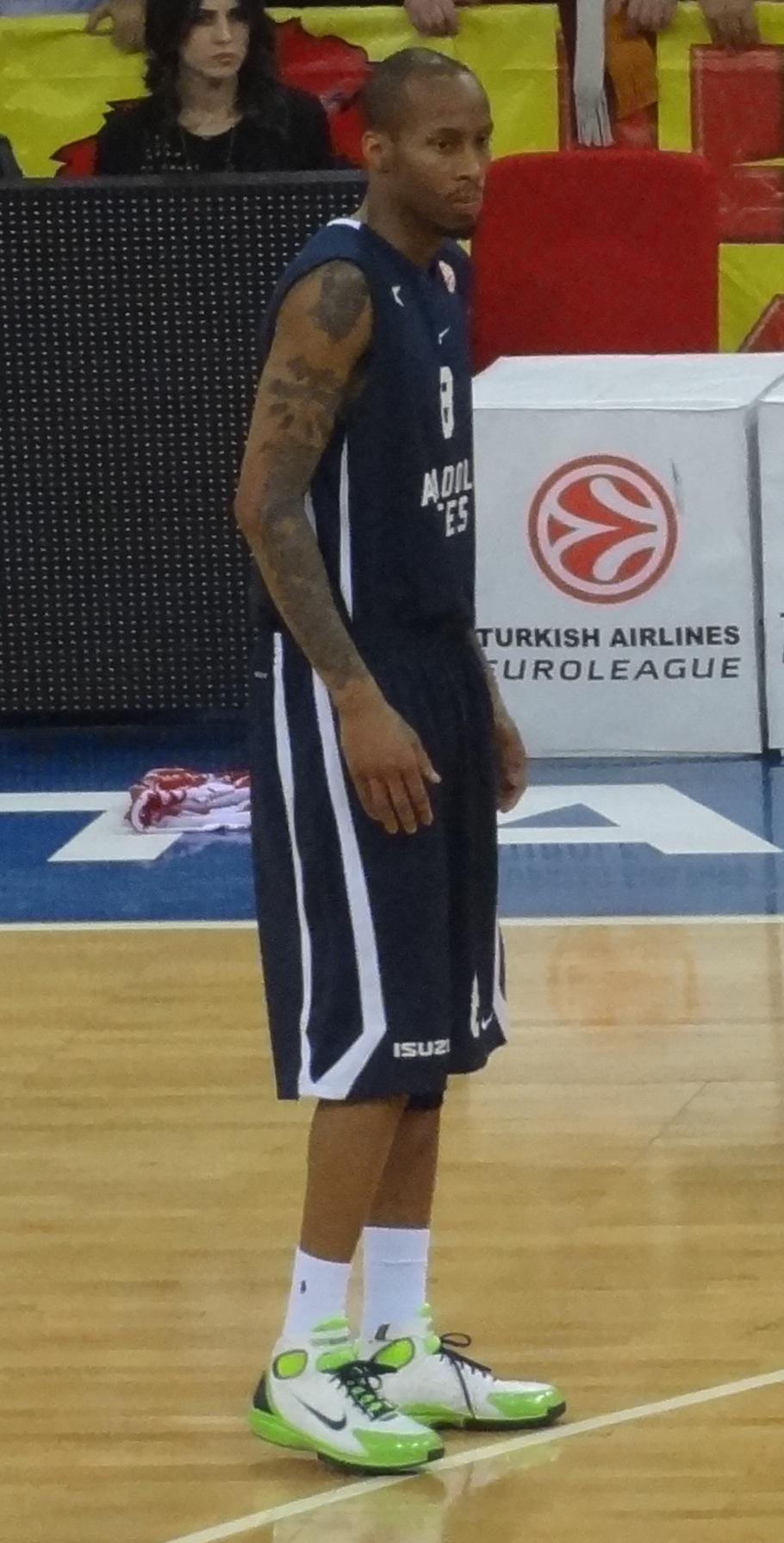
- Kinsey with Anadolu Efes in 2012

Personal information
- Born: March 21, 1984 (age 42) Tampa, Florida, U.S.
- Listed height: 6 ft 6 in (1.98 m)
- Listed weight: 185 lb (84 kg)

Career information
- High school: Thomas Jefferson (Tampa, Florida)
- College: South Carolina (2002–2006)
- NBA draft: 2006: undrafted
- Playing career: 2006–2020
- Position: Shooting guard / small forward

Career history
- 2006–2007: Memphis Grizzlies
- 2008: Fenerbahçe
- 2008–2009: Cleveland Cavaliers
- 2009–2011: Fenerbahçe
- 2011–2012: Anadolu Efes
- 2012–2013: VL Pesaro
- 2013: Málaga
- 2013–2014: Partizan
- 2014–2015: Nizhny Novgorod
- 2015: Trabzonspor
- 2016: Crvena zvezda
- 2016–2018: Hapoel Jerusalem
- 2018: Breogán
- 2018–2019: JDA Dijon
- 2019–2020: Orlandina

Career highlights
- EuroLeague steals leader (2015); Israeli Super League champion (2017); Israeli League Cup winner (2016); ABA League champion (2016); Serbian League champion (2016); Turkish League Finals MVP (2010); 3× Turkish League champion (2008, 2010, 2011); 2× Turkish Cup winner (2010, 2011); EuroLeague Steals Leader (2015); Second-team All-SEC (2006)
- Stats at NBA.com
- Stats at Basketball Reference

Tarence Anthony Kinsey (born March 21, 1984) is an American former professional basketball player. He played for the Memphis Grizzlies and the Cleveland Cavaliers of the National Basketball Association. He also played for several teams in Europe. He played college basketball for University of South Carolina.

== College career ==
Kinsey attended and played collegiately at the University of South Carolina where he helped lead the Gamecocks to two straight NIT championships; averaging 19.4 points, 4.2 rebounds, 3.2 assists, 2.6 steals and shooting 53% from the field in the NIT Tournament.

=== NIT Championship Game 2005 ===
While a junior at the University of South Carolina, Kinsey was an essential player on the Gamecocks basketball team. As the team made it to the NIT (National Invitation Tournament), they reached the championship game against St. Joseph's University. With less than 6 seconds remaining on the clock, St. Joe's sharpshooter Pat Carroll hit a 3-pointer to tie the game up, 57–57. Kinsey got the inbounds pass for USC, dribbled up court, and fired a 3-pointer that hit nothing but net with 1.3 seconds left to win the NIT for South Carolina, 60–57.

== Professional career ==
=== Memphis Grizzlies (2006–2008) ===
Undrafted out of college, Kinsey played the 2006–07 NBA season for the Memphis Grizzlies, averaging 7.7 points in 48 games. He started 12 games for the Grizzlies, averaging 18.8 points, 4.4 rebounds and 2.1 assists per game.

Kinsey took part in the 2007 NBA Europe Live Tour in Spain. He started the 2007–08 NBA season for the Memphis Grizzlies and played in 11 games for Memphis this season, averaging 3.6 points and 1.1 rebounds in limited action.

=== Fenerbahçe Ülker (2008) ===
After being released by the Grizzlies, Kinsey signed a contract to play in the TBL for the Fenerbahçe Ülker in Turkey. He averaged 9.2 points in 14 regular season games with Fenerbahce Ulker and helped the club to win the Beko Basketball League Finals (the final stage of the Turkish Basketball League playoffs).

Kinsey posted averages of 8.8 points on .492 shooting and 2.8 rebounds in 12 Euroleague games helping Fenerbahçe Ülker reach the quarterfinals of 2007–08 Euroleague. Kinsey tied for team high in scoring with 12 points in the first game of the best of three game quarterfinal series against Montepaschi Siena.

=== Cleveland Cavaliers (2008–2009) ===
On August 1, 2008, Kinsey signed a one-year contract with the Cleveland Cavaliers.

In the early part of the season, Kinsey usually only played during garbage time. After injuries to starting shooting guard Delonte West and top reserve Sasha Pavlović, Kinsey began playing more and even started a few games and played well until spraining his ankle in a game against Orlando. Kinsey returned following the All-Star game, and once again was the third-string shooting guard as West and Pavlović returned from injury.

=== Return to Fenerbahçe (2009–2011) ===
On August 25, 2009, Kinsey returned to Fenerbahçe Ülker for a second stint, signing a two-year deal.

=== Anadolu Efes (2011–2012) ===
In July 2011, he signed a one-year deal with Anadolu Efes.

=== Pesaro / Unicaja Malaga (2012–2013) ===
On September 26, 2012, Kinsey signed with the Golden State Warriors of the NBA. However, he did not make the team's final roster. On December 14, 2012, Kinsey signed with Victoria Libertas Pesaro in Italy's Lega Basket Serie A. On April 19, 2013, he left Pesaro and signed with Unicaja Málaga of Spain for the rest of the season.

=== Partizan Belgrade (2013–2014) ===
On September 9, 2013, Kinsey signed a one-year deal with the Serbian team Partizan Belgrade. In the season-opener game victory against Igokea, he debuted by scoring 15 points with a couple of the attractive dunks. In a second week of December, his block on Fenerbahçe's Bogdanović was a top play. In the Euroleague game against Lokomotiv Kuban on January 31, he scored career-high 32 points, while also adding 5 rebounds and 3 steals. In March 2014, he had a season-ending injury in the game against Cibona, when he sprained ankle on his right leg. He had one of the best seasons of his career, averaging career-high 14.8 points, 4.6 rebounds, over 16 games in the Euroleague.

=== Nizhny Novgorod (2014–2015) ===
On August 4, 2014, he signed a one-year deal with the Russian team Nizhny Novgorod. Nizhny Novgorod ended the competition in the VTB United League after being eliminated by CSKA Moscow with 3–0 in the semifinal series.

=== Trabzonspor (2015) ===
On July 22, 2015, Kinsey signed a one-year deal with the Turkish club Trabzonspor. On December 27, 2015, he parted ways with Trabzonspor after appearing in eleven league games and ten EuroCup games.

=== Crvena zvezda (2015–2016) ===
On December 28, 2015, Kinsey signed with the Serbian club Crvena zvezda for the rest of the season.

=== Hapoel Jerusalem (2016–2018) ===
On July 23, 2016, Kinsey signed a two-year deal with Israeli club Hapoel Jerusalem. In his first season with Jerusalem, Kinsey helped the team to win the 2016 Israeli League Cup and 2017 Israeli League Championship, as well as reaching the 2017 EuroCup Semifinals.

=== Breogán (2018) ===
On September 1, 2018, Kinsey signed with Cafés Candelas Breogán of the Liga ACB for the 2018–19 season.

=== Dijon (2018–2019) ===
On December 3, 2018, Kinsey signed with JDA Dijon of the Pro A for the rest of the 2018–19 season.

=== Orlandina Basket (2019–present) ===
On September 11, 2019, he has signed with Orlandina Basket of the Serie A2 Basket.

== Career statistics ==
Legend
GP	Games played	GS	Games started	MPG	Minutes per game
FG%	Field-goal percentage	3P%	3-point field-goal percentage	FT%	Free-throw percentage
RPG	Rebounds per game	APG	Assists per game	SPG	Steals per game
BPG	Blocks per game	PPG	Points per game	PIR	Performance index rating
**Bold**	Career high

=== NBA ===
==== Regular season ====
Year	Team	GP	GS	MPG	FG%	3P%	FT%	RPG	APG	SPG	BPG	PPG
2006–07	Memphis	48	**12**	**20.1**	**.457**	.283	.796	**2.0**	**.9**	**1.1**	.0	**7.7**
2007–08	Memphis	11	0	8.7	.421	**.429**	.833	1.1	.2	.3	.0	3.6
2008–09	Cleveland	**50**	3	5.5	.449	.389	**.868**	.8	.2	.2	.0	2.0
Career		109	15	12.3	.453	.324	.817	1.3	.5	.6	.0	4.7

==== Playoffs ====
Year	Team	GP	GS	MPG	FG%	3P%	FT%	RPG	APG	SPG	BPG	PPG
2009	Cleveland	9	0	1.2	.333	.000	1.000	.2	.0	.1	.0	.4
Career		9	0	1.2	.333	.000	1.000	.2	.0	.1	.0	.4

=== Euroleague ===
*	Led the league

Year	Team	GP	GS	MPG	FG%	3P%	FT%	RPG	APG	SPG	BPG	PPG	PIR
2007–08	Fenerbahçe	12	0	22.0	.402	.226	.727	2.8	.8	1.4	.2	8.8	7.6
2009–10	Fenerbahçe	10	8	24.7	.474	**.400**	.731	3.0	1.3	1.1	.1	10.1	9.9
2010–11	Fenerbahçe	14	2	22.3	**.485**	.250	.645	2.8	1.1	1.4	.1	8.4	8.0
2011–12	Anadolu Efes	9	7	25.0	.417	.278	.692	3.8	1.1	1.6	**.4**	8.2	8.0
2013–14	Partizan	16	13	**31.6**	.429	.355	.821	4.6	1.6	**1.8**	**.4**	**14.8**	**14.2**
2014–15	Nizhny Novgorod	**17**	**16**	30.9	.415	.370	.786	**5.1**	**1.8**	1.6*	.2	13.8	13.6
2015–16	Crvena zvezda	16	15	23.4	.413	.129	**.878**	2.2	1.1	1.4	.2	9.6	8.1
Career		94	61	26.1	.430	.296	.776	3.5	1.4	1.4	.2	10.9	9.7

=== College ===
Year	Team	GP	GS	MPG	FG%	3P%	FT%	RPG	APG	SPG	BPG	PPG
2002–03	South Carolina	20	3	8.8	.360	.071	.375	.8	.6	.2	.0	2.2
2003–04	South Carolina	33	25	21.9	.402	.318	.700	3.2	1.3	1.1	.2	8.3
2004–05	South Carolina	32	31	26.4	.394	**.387**	.667	3.4	1.6	1.3	**.4**	8.9
2005–06	South Carolina	**38**	**37**	**34.8**	**.453**	.378	**.843**	**4.6**	**2.3**	**1.6**	.3	**15.8**
Career		123	96	24.9	.421	.357	.817	1.3	.5	.0	.6	9.8

== Personal life ==
Kinsey has dated R&B singer Olivia.
