= Dragan Milosavljević =

Serbian basketball player (born 1989)

- Milosavljević with Igokea in 2026

No. 21 – Igokea m:tel
- Position: Shooting guard / small forward
- League: Bosnian League; ABA League

Personal information
- Born: May 11, 1989 (age 37) Kruševac, SR Serbia, SFR Yugoslavia
- Listed height: 1.98 m (6 ft 6 in)
- Listed weight: 91 kg (201 lb)

Career information
- NBA draft: 2011: undrafted
- Playing career: 2006–present

Career history
- 2006–2009: Napredak
- 2009–2010: Radnički
- 2010–2015: Partizan
- 2015–2017: Alba Berlin
- 2017–2021: Unicaja
- 2021: Mega
- 2021: Bursaspor
- 2021–2022: Fuenlabrada
- 2022: Mega
- 2022–present: Igokea

Career highlights
- 2× ABA League champion (2011, 2013); 4× Serbian League champion (2011–2014); 2× Serbian Cup winner (2011, 2012); Serbian League Playoffs MVP (2013); German Cup winner (2016); 3× Bosnian League champion (2023–2025); 2× Bosnian Cup winner (2023, 2025)
Medals
Men's basketball
Representing Serbia
EuroBasket
Silver medal – second place	2017 Finland–Israel–Romania–Turkey

Dragan Milosavljević (Serbian Cyrillic: Драган Милосављевић; born May 11, 1989) is a Serbian professional basketball player and team captain for Igokea m:tel of the Bosnian League and the ABA League. He also represented the Serbian national basketball team internationally. Standing at 6 ft 6 in (1.98 m), he plays at the shooting guard and small forward positions.

== Professional career ==
=== Early career ===
Milosavljević began his career in Napredak Kruševac where he played until 2009. He was signed by Radnički Kragujevac in 2009. He stayed there for one season, playing in the Serbian League and ABA League. In the ABA League, he averaged 10.2 points, 3.8 rebounds and 2.1 assists per game for Radnički.

=== Partizan (2010–2015) ===
On June 28, 2010, he signed a three-year deal with Partizan. In his first season in Partizan, he won the Adriatic League, Serbian League and Radivoj Korać Cup. In the EuroLeague, Milosavljević averaged 4.2 points and 1.9 rebounds per game, while in the ABA League he averaged 6.9 points and 3 rebounds per game.

In his second season, Milosavljević helped his club to defend titles in Serbian League and Radivoj Korać Cup. In the 2011–12 Euroleague season, he averaged 8.2 points and 3.7 rebounds in 10 games of group stage. In the 2011–12 Adriatic League season, Milosavljević averaged 8.3 points and 3.6 rebounds over 27 games. On July 4, 2012, he extended his contract for two more seasons with Partizan.

Next season, Milosavljević won the Serbian League for the third time and he was named the MVP of the finals. In the 2012–13 Euroleague, he scored a career-high of 9.9 points per game. In the Adriatic League he helped his team to return the title after a one-year break averaging 6.8 points and 3.2 rebounds per game.

Despite some financial difficulties the club was facing in the summer of 2013, Milosavljević decided to stay with Partizan. Then, after the departure of team captain Vladimir Lučić, he became the next team captain. Along with Léo Westermann and Bogdan Bogdanović he was supposed to lead the backcourt of Partizan in the upcoming season. In a second game of the 2013–14 Euroleague season against JSF Nanterre, he scored 26 points, while also pulling down 6 rebounds, to help his team win by huge margin. In the Euroleague game against Maccabi Tel Aviv on January 24, he has torn ACL on his right knee, which sidelined him for the remainder of the season. He was expected to return on court in six to eight months. In his first season as captain of Partizan, he averaged career-high 12.1 points and 3.7 rebounds per game in the 2013–14 Euroleague, while also averaging 12.4 points, 3.3 rebounds and 2.6 assists in 17 games of the 2013–14 Adriatic League season.

On August 5, 2014, Milosavljević extended his contract for one more season with the club. In December 2014, he returned on the court after ten months of absence due to the injury. The rest of the season, he averaged 11 points, 3.7 rebounds and 1 assist over ABA League 20 games.

=== Alba Berlin (2015–2017) ===
On June 25, 2015, Milosavljević signed a two-year contract with the German club Alba Berlin. On October 1, he debuted for the team in 74–54 win over ratiopharm Ulm in Round 1 of the German League; he had 5 points, 5 rebounds and 4 assists. Alba Berlin eventually lost in the quarterfinal series of 2016 BBL Playoffs with 3–0 to Skyliners Frankfurt. In the German League, he averaged 12.3 points, 5.1 rebounds and 2.5 assists over 35 games. In 2015–16 Eurocup season, Milosavljević appeared in 17 games, averaging 14.5 points, 4.9 rebounds and 2.7 assists per game.

In 2016–17 season, Alba Berlin was once again stopped in the quarterfinal series of 2017 BBL Playoffs with 3–1 to Bayern Munich. In 30 games of the German League, Milosavljević averaged 12.7 points, 3.1 rebounds and 3.9 assists per game. 2016–17 EuroCup season, Milosavljević averaged 12.9 points, 2.7 rebounds and 3.6 assists over 14 games.

=== Unicaja Málaga (2017–2021) ===
In July 2017, he signed a contract with the Spanish team Unicaja Málaga. In his first season with the club, he appeared in 27 EuroLeague games and averaged 6.4 points and 2.6 rebounds per game. In ACB League, he averaged 4.5 points per game.

In 2018–19 season, he averaged 6.2 points and 2.6 assists in 19 EuroCup appearances for Unicaja. In 37 ACB League games, he had similar production, averaging 6.6 points per game.

On June 12, 2019, Milosavljević signed a two-year contract extension with Unicaja. In August 2019, while representing Serbia in a game against Turkey, as part of preparations for the 2019 FIBA Basketball World Cup, Milosavljević suffered ACL tear in his left knee, which was estimated to keep him off the court at least until 2020. In November 2020, he returned to trainings after a 15-month break. However, he did not play in a single game during that season. On February 17, 2021, the club parted ways with Milosavljević.

=== Mega Basket (2021) ===
On April 2, 2021, he signed a contract with Mega Soccerbet of the Basketball League of Serbia. Milosavljević did not play in a single game during the time at Mega Basket, making him without any official game played for the entire two seasons.

=== 2021–22 ===
On July 6, 2021, Milosavljević signed with Bursaspor Basketbol of the Basketbol Süper Ligi and the EuroCup. He appeared in three games with the club, in which he had a limited role. On November 22, 2021, he signed with Urbas Fuenlabrada of the Liga ACB. Over 20 league games, he averaged 8.4 points while shooting 40.1% from the field.

=== Mega Basket (2022) ===
In October 2022, Milosavljević signed a contract with Mega Basket, where he stayed for a couple of months.

=== Igokea (2022–present) ===
On December 30, 2022, he switched to the Bosnian team Igokea, participating in the same league. Over 16 ABA league games in the 2022–23 season, he averaged 11.5 points, 4.3 rebounds and 3.5 assists while shooting 41.7% from the field. In his second season with the team, he averaged 9.7 points 3.5 rebounds and 2.2 assists over 26 ABA League games. On June 22, 2024, he extended his contract with Igokea.

== Serbian national team ==
The Serbian national team head coach Dušan Ivković called Milosavljević for the 2010 FIBA World Championship in Turkey, but he didn't manage to make the final roster.

He represented Serbia for the first time at the EuroBasket 2015 under head coach Aleksandar Đorđević. In the first phase of the tournament, Serbia dominated in the toughest Group B with 5–0 record, and then eliminated Finland and Czech Republic in the round of 16 and quarterfinal game, respectively. However, they were stopped in the semifinal game by Lithuania with 67–64, and eventually lost to the host team France in the bronze-medal game with 81–68. Over 7 tournament games played, Milosavljević saw very little playing time, mostly being used by head coach as a defensive task specialist.

Milosavljević also represented Serbia at the EuroBasket 2017 where they won the silver medal, after losing in the final game to Slovenia.

In preparations for the 2019 FIBA Basketball World Cup, Milosavljević was on the list of 14 candidates for the final 12-men roster of Serbia, but he suffered serious left knee injury in a friendly Acropolis Tournament game against Turkey. The injury was later diagnosed to be ACL tear, preventing Milosavljević to represent Serbia in the World Cup.

== Career statistics ==
Legend
GP	Games played	GS	Games started	MPG	Minutes per game
FG%	Field-goal percentage	3P%	3-point field-goal percentage	FT%	Free-throw percentage
RPG	Rebounds per game	APG	Assists per game	SPG	Steals per game
BPG	Blocks per game	PPG	Points per game	PIR	Performance index rating
**Bold**	Career high

=== Euroleague ===
Year	Team	GP	GS	MPG	FG%	3P%	FT%	RPG	APG	SPG	BPG	PPG	PIR
2010–11	Partizan	16	6	19.0	.381	.222	.650	1.9	.8	.6	.1	4.2	1.3
2011–12	Partizan	10	10	28.9	.333	.239	**.810**	**3.7**	1.4	.6	**.6**	8.2	5.9
2012–13	Partizan	10	7	26.5	**.522**	.273	.724	2.8	1.2	**.9**	.4	9.9	9.2
2013–14	Partizan	14	13	**32.0**	.435	**.344**	.667	**3.7**	**1.6**	**.9**	.3	**12.1**	**9.7**
2017–18	Unicaja	**27**	**16**	18.5	.417	.333	.769	2.6	1.0	.5	.1	6.4	5.6
Career		77	52	23.4	.419	.296	.727	2.8	1.1	.7	.2	7.7	6.0
