= Nikola Otašević =

Serbian basketball player

Nikola Otasevic
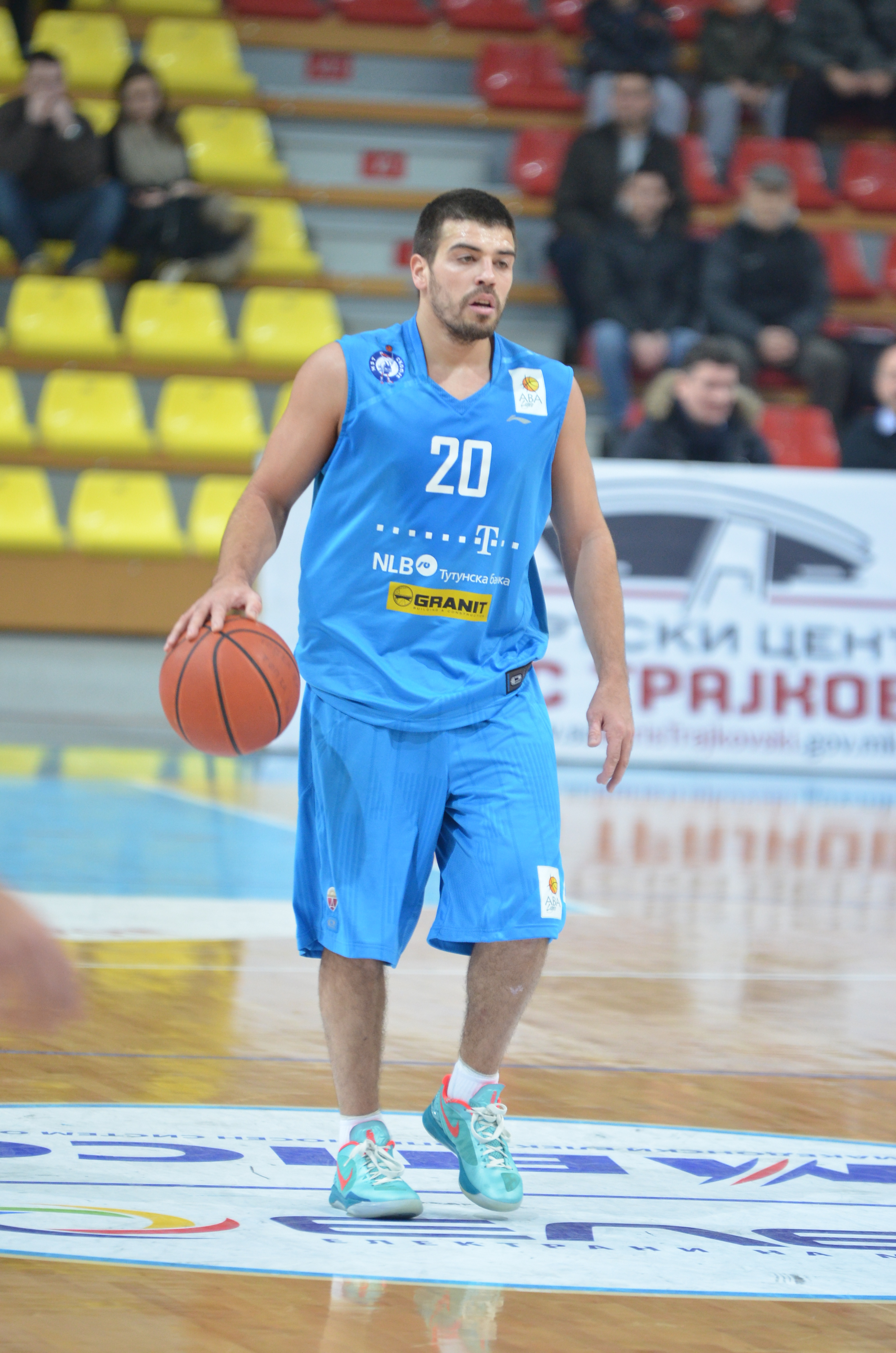
- With MZT in 2012

Personal information
- Born: January 25, 1982 (age 44) Titovo Užice, SFR Yugoslavia
- Listed height: 1.84 m (6 ft 0 in)
- Listed weight: 74 kg (163 lb)

Career information
- NBA draft: 2004: undrafted
- Playing career: 2000–2019
- Position: Point guard
- Number: 10, 20

Career history
- 2000–2002: Beopetrol
- 2002–2004: Ergonom
- 2004–2005: Zdravlje
- 2005–2006: OKK Beograd
- 2006–2007: Anwil Włocławek
- 2007–2011: Budućnost Podgorica
- 2011–2012: Hemofarm
- 2012: Sloboda Užice
- 2012–2014: MZT Skopje
- 2014–2015: Metalac Valjevo
- 2015–2016: Sloboda Užice
- 2016–2017: BC Timișoara
- 2017–2019: Sloboda Užice

Career highlights
- 4× Montenegrin League champion (2008–2011); 4× Montenegrin Cup winner (2008–2011); 2× Macedonian League champion (2013, 2014); 2× Macedonian Cup winner (2013, 2014); Polish Cup winner (2007)

Nikola Otašević (Serbian Cyrillic: Никола Оташевић; born January 25, 1982) is a former Serbian professional basketball player.

== Career ==
On June 30, 2019, Otašević announced his retirement from playing career.

== Career statistics ==
=== Eurocup ===
Year	Team	GP	GS	MPG	FG%	3P%	FT%	RPG	APG	SPG	BPG	PPG	PIR
2006-07	Scandone Avellino	6	1	13.0	.615	.600	.778	1.0	2.3	1.7	0.0	4.3	6.8
2007–08	Budućnost Podgorica	13	2	20.4	.368	.250	.806	1.3	3.7	1.9	0.0	6.0	5.7
2008-09	Budućnost Podgorica	5	0	19.0	.429	.600	.583	2.8	1.4	0.8	0.0	4.4	3.8
2011–12	Budućnost Podgorica	6	0	16.2	.389	.333	.1000	1.7	2.3	1.3	0.0	3.0	2.7
2013–14	MZT Skopje	7	7	22.0	.452	.200	.1000	2.0	3.1	0.9	0.0	4.6	3.1
Career		37	10	18.0	.421	.326	.768	1.6	2.8	1.4	0.0	4.7	4.4
