= Léo Westermann =

French basketball player (born 1992)

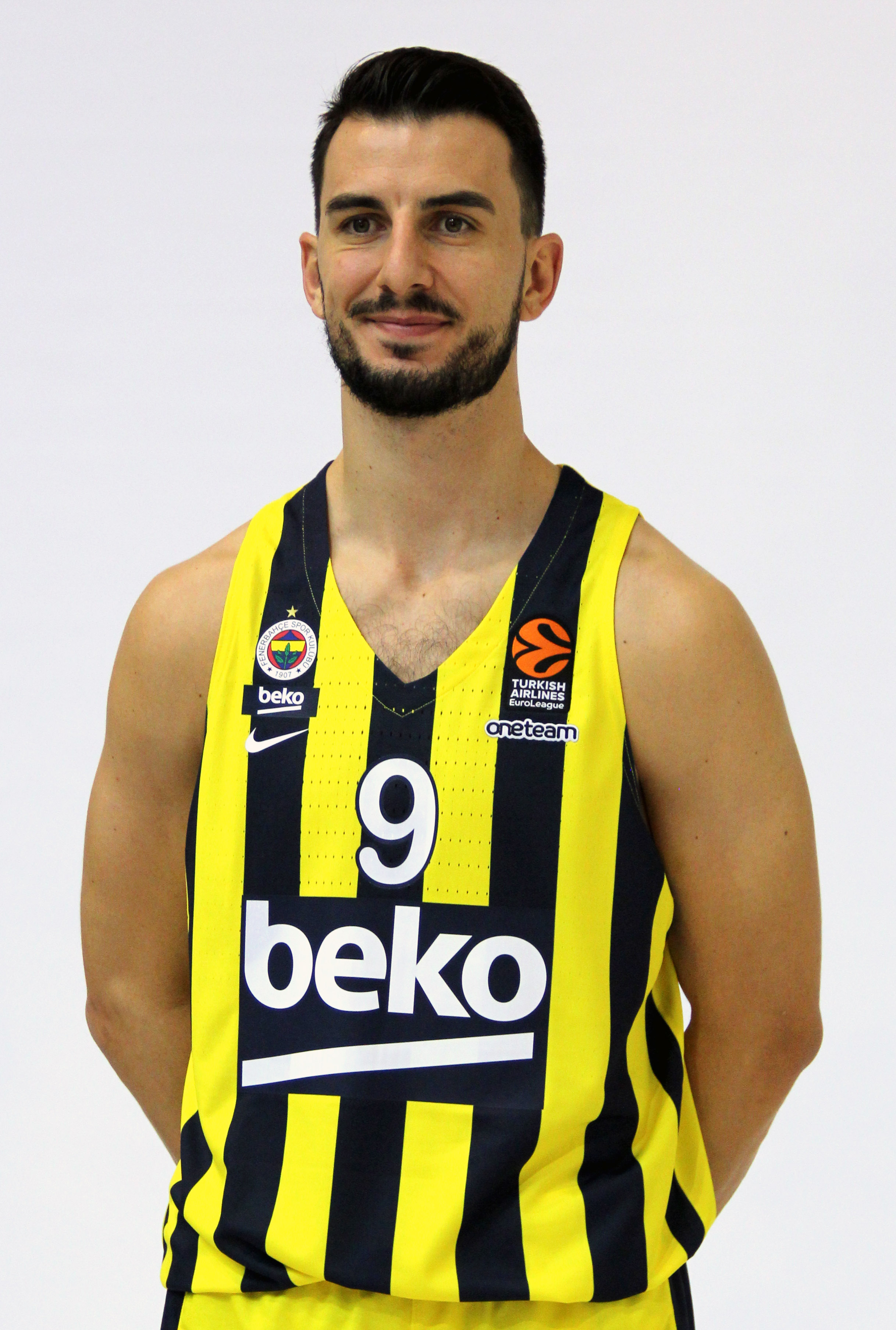
- Westermann in 2019

No. 9 – CB Estudiantes
- Position: Point guard
- League: Primera FEB

Personal information
- Born: 24 July 1992 (age 34) Haguenau, France
- Listed height: 1.98 m (6 ft 6 in)
- Listed weight: 90 kg (198 lb)

Career information
- NBA draft: 2014: undrafted
- Playing career: 2010–present

Career history
- 2010–2012: ASVEL
- 2012–2014: Partizan
- 2014–2016: Limoges
- 2016–2017: Žalgiris
- 2017–2018: CSKA Moscow
- 2018–2019: Žalgiris
- 2019–2020: Fenerbahçe
- 2020–2021: Barcelona
- 2021–2022: Monaco
- 2022–2023: Obradoiro
- 2023–2024: Crailsheim Merlins
- 2024–2025: Fuenlabrada
- 2025–2026: Obradoiro
- 2026–present: Estudiantes

Career highlights
- Primera FEB champion (2026); Spanish League champion (2021); Turkish Cup winner (2020); 2× Lithuanian League champion (2017, 2019); Lithuanian Cup winner (2017); Adriatic League champion (2013); 2× Serbian League champion (2013, 2014); FIBA Europe Under-20 Championship MVP (2012); Nike Hoop Summit (2012)
Medals
Men's basketball
Representing France
EuroBasket
Bronze medal – third place	2015 France–Croatia–Germany–Latvia
European U-20 Championship
Silver medal – second place	2012 Slovenia	U-20 Team
Bronze medal – third place	2011 Spain	U-20 Team
European U-18 Championship
Silver medal – second place	2009 France	U-18 Team

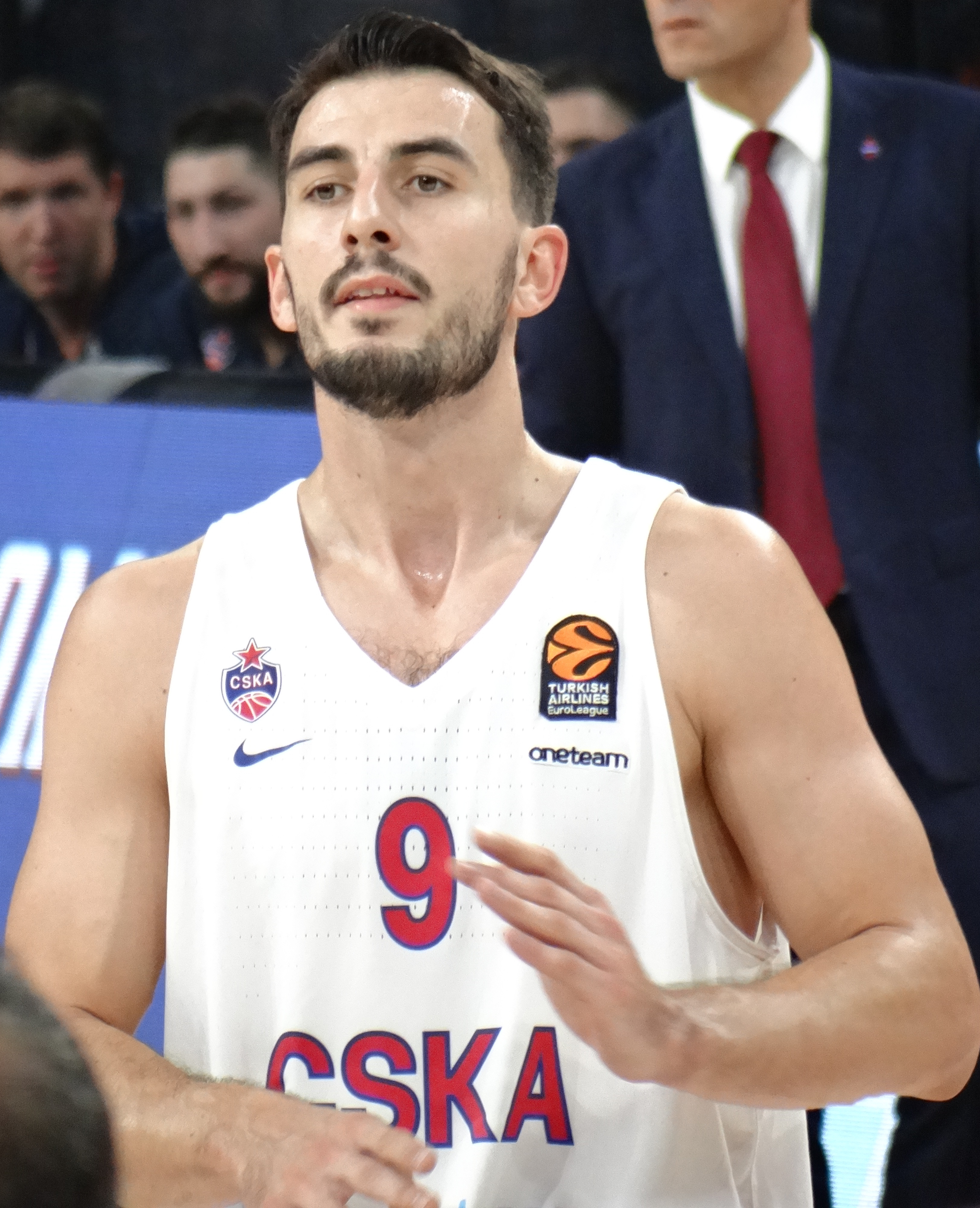
Westermann in 2017

Léo Joseph Paul Westermann (born 24 July 1992) is a French professional basketball player for Estudiantes of Primera FEB. Standing at 1.98 m (6 ft 6 in), he plays the point guard position. He also represents the senior French national basketball team.

== Early years ==
Westermann started his men's club career in 2008, playing for Centre Fédéral de Basketball, in the Nationale Masculine 1, the third division of French basketball. He played for Centre Fed for two seasons, averaging 10.1 points, 2.6 assists, and 1.1 steals per game, in 48 games played.

== Professional career ==
=== ASVEL ===
Westermann signed with the French club ASVEL Basket, in 2010. He stayed there for two seasons, playing in the top-tier level French Pro A and in the European-wide 2nd-tier level EuroCup. In 2012, Westermann was selected to play for the World Team at the Nike Hoop Summit in Portland, Oregon. He left the team just a few hours before he signed a contract with a different team.

=== Partizan ===
On 2 July 2012, it was reported that Westermann had signed a three-year contract with Serbian club Partizan. With Partizan was one of the candidates for the prestigious EuroLeague Rising Star award, which eventually went to Kostas Papanikolaou. In his first season, he averaged 9.6 points, 2.6 rebounds, and 4.1 assists per game in the EuroLeague. In the ABA League season, Westermann helped his team to win the title, averaging 6.9 points, 2.5 rebounds, and 2.2 assists per game, in 28 games. In November's EuroLeague away game against CSKA Moscow, he tore his ACL on his knee, which sidelined him for the remainder of the season. As a result of the injury, Partizan had to find a replacement for him in Milenko Tepić, a former member of the team.

=== Barcelona / Limoges ===
On 17 July 2014, Spanish club FC Barcelona acquired the player rights of Westermann. On 25 July 2014, he was loaned by Barcelona to the French EuroLeague team Limoges CSP, for one season. Over 10 EuroLeague season games, he averaged 7.7 points, 2.3 rebounds, a career-high 4.3 assists, and 1.3 steal per game. On 11 July 2015, Westermann signed a one-year extension, with the option of another year, with Limoges.

=== Žalgiris ===
On 30 May 2016, Westermann signed a one-year contract, with the possibility to extend it for one more year, with the Lithuanian club Žalgiris. Over 30 EuroLeague season games, he averaged 8.2 points, 3.2 rebounds, 5.5 assists, and 0.5 steals per game.

=== CSKA Moscow ===
On 22 June 2017, the Russian club CSKA Moscow, announced the signing of Westermann, to a 1+1 (2nd year being optional) year contract. On 16 July 2018, Westermann was officially released from CSKA.

=== Return to Žalgiris Kaunas ===
On 23 September 2018, Westermann returned to Žalgiris and signed a one-plus-one-year contract.

=== Fenerbahçe ===
On 12 July 2019, Westermann signed a two-year deal with Fenerbahçe of the Turkish Basketball League. On 22 December 2020, he was released by Fenerbahçe.

=== Barcelona ===
On 22 December 2020, Westermann signed as a free-agent with EuroLeague powerhouse FC Barcelona of the Liga ACB.

=== AS Monaco ===
On 29 July 2021, Westermann signed a one-year deal with EuroCup champions AS Monaco Basket of the French LNB Pro A and the EuroLeague.

=== Monbus Obradoiro ===
On 5 August 2022, Westermann signed a one-year deal with Monbus Obradoiro of the Liga ACB.

=== Crailsheim Merlins ===
In late September 2023, he signed with the Crailsheim Merlins of the German Bundesliga.

=== Baloncesto Fuenlabrada ===
On July 10, 2024, he signed with Fuenlabrada of the Primera FEB.

=== Return to Monbus Obradoiro ===
On July 10, 2025, he signed with Monbus Obradoiro of Primera FEB.

== Career statistics ==
Legend
GP	Games played	GS	Games started	MPG	Minutes per game
FG%	Field-goal percentage	3P%	3-point field-goal percentage	FT%	Free-throw percentage
RPG	Rebounds per game	APG	Assists per game	SPG	Steals per game
BPG	Blocks per game	PPG	Points per game	PIR	Performance index rating
**Bold**	Career high

=== EuroLeague ===
Year	Team	GP	GS	MPG	FG%	3P%	FT%	RPG	APG	SPG	BPG	PPG	PIR
2012–13	Partizan	9	7	**28.9**	.392	.433	.846	2.6	4.1	.3	.0	9.6	6.6
2013–14	Partizan	5	5	27.1	.344	.385	**1.000**	1.4	2.2	.4	.0	7.0	3.8
2014–15	Limoges	10	10	23.4	.370	.368	.900	2.3	4.3	**1.7**	**.1**	7.7	8.3
2015–16	Limoges	10	10	27.3	**.468**	.344	.889	2.8	4.3	1.1	**.1**	**10.1**	**10.7**
2016–17	Žalgiris	**30**	**27**	25.3	.425	.344	.886	**3.2**	**5.5**	.5	.0	8.2	10.0
2017–18	CSKA Moscow	17	4	13.5	.362	.325	**1.000**	1.2	1.9	.4	**.1**	4.6	4.0
2018–19	Žalgiris	27	11	17.3	.398	.420	.744	2.0	2.8	.6	.0	6.4	5.9
2019–20	Fenerbahçe	22	10	11.9	.439	**.477**	.714	1.6	1.8	.4	.0	3.8	3.4
2020–21	Fenerbahçe	9	3	12.6	.444	.450	**1.000**	1.7	2.3	.6	.0	4.8	4.0
2020–21	Barcelona	15	1	11.0	.351	.308	.778	1.4	1.8	.3	.0	2.7	2.9
2021–22	Monaco	22	14	16.7	.352	.316	.885	1.5	2.5	.3	**.1**	4.8	4.1
Career		176	102	18.5	.401	.376	.859	2.0	3.1	.5	.0	6.1	5.9

== National team career ==
=== French junior national team ===
As a player of France's junior teams, Westermann won a silver medal at the 2009 FIBA Europe Under-18 Championship. Westermann also played at the 2011 FIBA Europe Under-20 Championship, where he helped France to win a bronze medal. At the 2012 FIBA Europe Under-20 Championship, Westermann won the silver medal, and was named the tournament's MVP.

=== French senior national team ===
Westermann was on the senior French national basketball team's candidate list to compete at the EuroBasket 2013. However, unlike his teammate in Partizan Belgrade, Joffrey Lauvergne, he did not make it onto France's final 12-man squad for the tournament. He played with France at EuroBasket 2015, where he won a bronze medal.

He also played at EuroBasket 2017.
