= 2016–17 KK Partizan season =

Partizan NIS Belgrade
2016–17 season
- President: Nikola Peković
- Head coach: Aleksandar Džikić
- Basketball League of Serbia: Semi-finals
- Radivoj Korać Cup: Runner-up
- Adriatic League: Final Four
- Basketball Champions League: Play-offs qualifiers
Home	Away

In the 2016–17 season, Partizan NIS Belgrade competed in the Basketball League of Serbia, the Radivoj Korać Cup, the Adriatic League and the Champions League.

== Players ==
=== Roster ===
Note: Flags indicate national team eligibility at FIBA-sanctioned events. Players may hold other non-FIBA nationalities not displayed.

KK Partizan NIS roster
Players
Coaches

Pos.	No.	Nat.	Name	Ht.	Wt.	Age
PG	6	(Serbia)	Ratkovica, Branislav	1.93 m (6 ft 4 in)	82 kg (181 lb)	41 – 27 July 1985
SG	8	(Serbia)	Jovanović, Slobodan	1.93 m (6 ft 4 in)	95 kg (209 lb)	29 – 19 February 1997
SG	9	(Serbia)	Marinković, Vanja	1.98 m (6 ft 6 in)	86 kg (190 lb)	29 – 9 January 1997
F	10	(Serbia)	Tanasković, Nikola	2.03 m (6 ft 8 in)		28 – 21 October 1997
PF	12	(Serbia)	Veličković, Novica (C)	2.05 m (6 ft 9 in)	109 kg (240 lb)	39 – 5 October 1986
C	13	(Serbia)	Majstorović, Đorđe	2.11 m (6 ft 11 in)	102 kg (225 lb)	36 – 13 March 1990
PF	14	(Serbia)	Birčević, Stefan	2.10 m (6 ft 11 in)	98 kg (216 lb)	36 – 13 December 1989
C	15	(Serbia)	Koprivica, Miloš	2.08 m (6 ft 10 in)	100 kg (220 lb)	31 – 24 March 1995
SF	21	(Serbia)	Andrić, Mihajlo	2.00 m (6 ft 7 in)	88 kg (194 lb)	32 – 4 January 1994
PG	25	(United States)	Hatcher, Will	1.88 m (6 ft 2 in)	85 kg (187 lb)	41 – 8 August 1984
SF	27	(Bosnia and Herzegovina)	Vrabac, Adin	2.02 m (6 ft 8 in)	90 kg (198 lb)	32 – 27 January 1994
SG	33	(Serbia)	Pot, Stefan	1.96 m (6 ft 5 in)	87 kg (192 lb)	32 – 15 July 1994
PF	43	(Bosnia and Herzegovina)	Karahodžić, Kenan	2.10 m (6 ft 11 in)	104 kg (229 lb)	30 – 29 January 1996
SG	44	(United States)	Gordon, Jamont	1.93 m (6 ft 4 in)	102 kg (225 lb)	39 – 16 March 1987
C	55	(Serbia)	Luković, Uroš	2.13 m (7 ft 0 in)	100 kg (220 lb)	37 – 8 June 1989

Head coach

- (Serbia) Aleksandar Džikić

Assistant coach(es)

- (Serbia) Dušan Kecman
- (Serbia) Nenad Čanak

Strength & conditioning coach(es)

- (Serbia) Mladen Mihajlović
- (Serbia) Zlatko Tešić

Physiotherapist(s)

- (Serbia) Predrag Šapina

Team manager

- (Serbia) Dragan Todorić

Legend

- (C) Team captain
- Injured

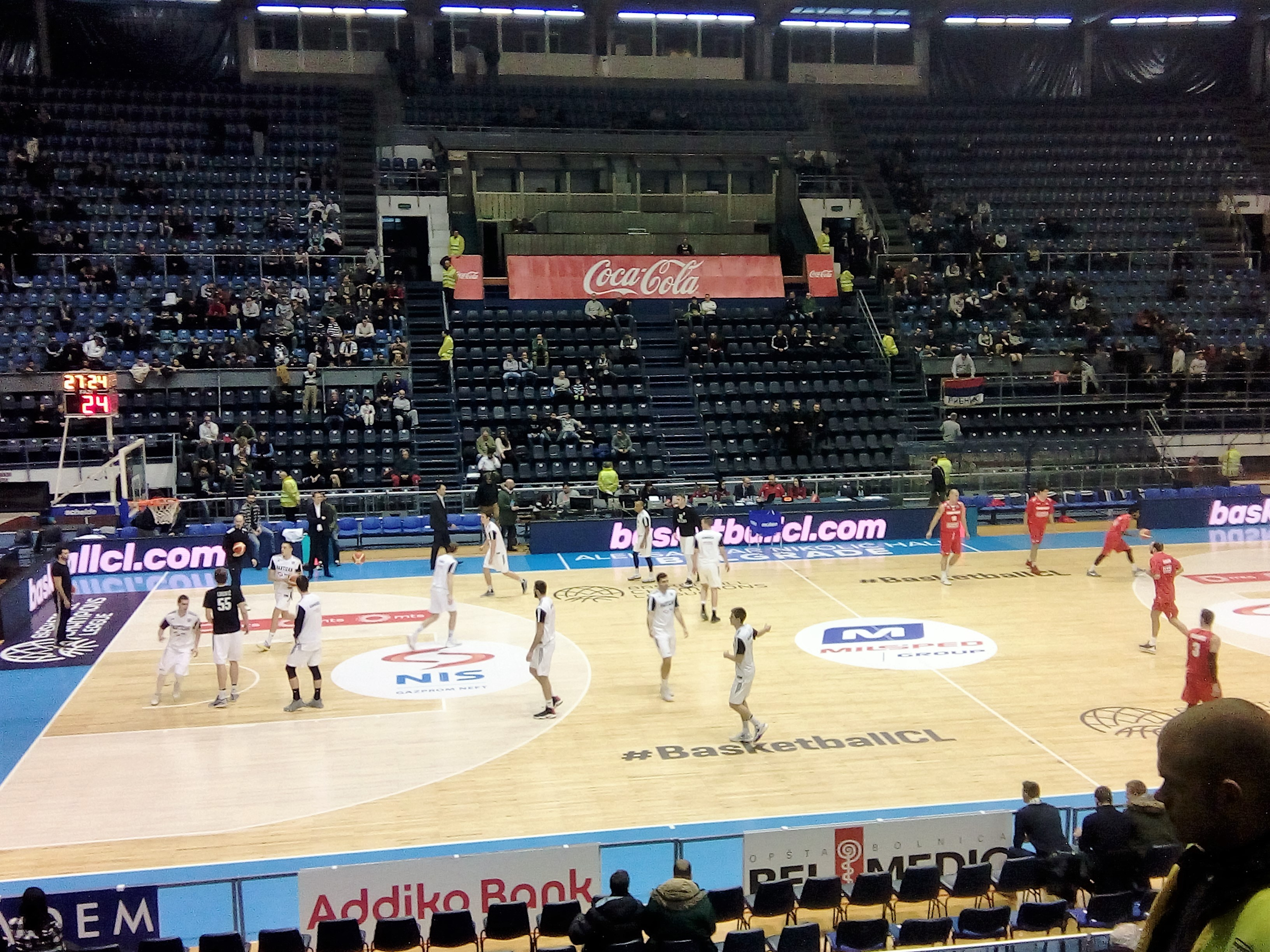
Players before the match against Szolnoki Olaj in BCL on 4 January

=== Depth chart ===
Pos.	Starting 5	Bench 1	Bench 2	Bench 3
C	Uroš Luković	Đorđe Majstorović	Miloš Koprivica
PF	Stefan Birčević	Novica Veličković	Kenan Karahodžić
SF	Adin Vrabac	Mihajlo Andrić	Nikola Tanasković
SG	Jamont Gordon	Vanja Marinković	Frank Robinson	Slobodan Jovanović
PG	Will Hatcher	Branislav Ratkovica	Stefan Pot

=== Roster changes ===
==== In ====
No.	Pos.	Nat.	Name	Moving from	Source
13	C	(Serbia)	Đorđe Majstorović	(Serbia) Metalac	
55	C	(Serbia)	Uroš Luković	(North Macedonia) MZT Skopje	
14	PF	(Serbia)	Stefan Birčević	(Spain) Estudiantes	
43	PF	(Bosnia and Herzegovina)	Kenan Karahodžić	(Spain) Unicaja	
5	SG	(United States)	Frank Robinson	(Turkey) İstanbul DSI	
25	PG	(United States)	Will Hatcher	(Greece) PAOK	
6	PG	(Serbia)	Branislav Ratkovica	(Bulgaria) Lukoil Academic	
33	PG	(Serbia)	Stefan Pot	(Serbia) Mladost Zemun	
44	SG	(United States)	Jamont Gordon	Free agent	

==== Out ====
No.	Pos.	Nat.	Name	Moving to	Source
14	C	(Serbia)	Božo Đumić	(Bosnia and Herzegovina) Sloboda Tuzla	
6	PF/C	(United States)	Kevin Jones	(Russia) Lokomotiv Kuban	
25	C	(United States)	Darrell Williams	(Israel) Hapoel Tel Aviv	
13	PF	(Serbia)	Čedomir Vitkovac	(Serbia) Napredak Rubin	
8	SF	(Slovenia)	Edo Murić	(Turkey) Banvit	
22	SF	(Serbia)	Andreja Milutinović	(Greece) Koroivos Amaliadas	
5	SG	(Serbia)	Petar Aranitović	(Spain) Manresa	
31	PG	(Finland)	Jamar Wilson	(Spain) Estudiantes	
4	PG	(Serbia)	Aleksandar Cvetković	(Spain) Manresa	
5	SG	(United States)	Frank Robinson	Free agent	
19	PG	(North Macedonia)	Andrej Magdevski	(North Macedonia) Feni Industries	

== Competitions ==
	Competition	Position	Record
(Serbia)	Basketball League of Serbia	Semifinals	12–4
(Serbia)	Radivoj Korać Cup	Runners-up	2–1
(European Union)	Adriatic League	Semifinals	20–9
(European Union)	Basketball Champions League	Play-offs qualifiers	9–7

== Serbian Super League ==
=== Regular season ===
League table

Pos	Team	Pld	W	L	PF	PA	PD	Pts	Qualification or relegation
1	Crvena zvezda mts	14	13	1	1212	940	+272	27	Qualification to the Playoffs
2	Partizan NIS	14	12	2	1182	1099	+83	26	Qualification to the Playoffs
3	FMP	14	9	5	1112	995	+117	23	Qualification to the Playoffs
4	Mega Leks	14	9	5	1177	1133	+44	23	Qualification to the Playoffs
5	Dynamic	14	5	9	1096	1135	−39	19	

Source: Basketball League of Serbia

Win Loss

21 April 2017 1	Partizan	86–76	Vršac	Belgrade
20:00	Scoring by quarter: 21–26, 14–15, 26–22, 25–13
	Pts: Birčević 15	Report	Pts: Fundić 17	Arena: Aleksandar Nikolić Hall; Attendance: 1,500; Referees: Glišić, Stefanović, Ninković

25 April 2017 2	Crvena zvezda	85–74	Partizan	Belgrade
20:00	Scoring by quarter: 23–16, 19–22, 23–18, 20–18
	Pts: Mitrović 17; Rebs: Wolters 5 Asts: Jenkins 9	Report	Pts: Luković 17; Rebs: Veličković 8 Asts: Ratkovica 6	Arena: Aleksandar Nikolić Hall; Attendance: 5,247; Referees: Vojinović, Glišić, Nikolić

29 April 2017 3	Partizan	76–66	Dynamic	Belgrade
19:30	Scoring by quarter: 14–16, 26–15, 25–21, 11–14
	Pts: Gordon 14	Report	Pts: Čakarević 21	Arena: Aleksandar Nikolić Hall; Attendance: 1,000; Referees: M. Juras, J. Juras, Pecelj

3 May 2017 4	Spartak	75–82	Partizan	Subotica
19:00	Scoring by quarter: 23–17, 24–19, 14–32, 14–14
	Pts: Kesar 25	Report	Pts: Birčević 21	Arena: SC Dudova Šuma; Attendance: 700; Referees: Obrknežević, Mrdak, Ninković

6 May 2017 5	Partizan	93–87	Borac	Belgrade
19:30	Scoring by quarter: 20–14, 19–26, 31–26, 23–21
	Pts: Hatcher 19	Report	Pts: Radonjić 22	Arena: Aleksandar Nikolić Hall; Attendance: 700; Referees: M. Juras, Jevtović, Milojević

9 May 2017 6	Partizan	82–71	FMP	Belgrade
18:00	Scoring by quarter: 22–27, 21–17, 19–15, 20–12
	Pts: Luković 15	Report	Pts: Bolden 14	Arena: Aleksandar Nikolić Hall; Attendance: 1,500

12 May 2017 7	Mega Leks	79–84	Partizan	Sremska Mitrovica
20:30	Scoring by quarter: 19–27, 24–14, 24–13, 12–30
	Pts: Simeunović 15	Report	Pts: Hatcher 17	Arena: Pinki Hall; Attendance: 1,500

15 May 2017 8	Vršac	74–81	Partizan	Vršac
18:00	Scoring by quarter: 19–20, 21–25, 19–15, 15–21
	Pts: Jeftić 16	Report	Pts: Birčević, Hatcher 16	Arena: Millennium Centar; Attendance: 3,000; Referees: Nešković, Maričić, Stefanović

18 May 2017 9	Partizan	78–77	Crvena zvezda	Belgrade
19:00	Scoring by quarter: 16–21, 22–20, 18–21, 22–15
	Pts: Veličković, Hatcher 16; Rebs: Veličković 7 Asts: Hatcher, Ratkovica 4	Report	Pts: Simonović 20; Rebs: Kuzmić, Mitrović 7 Asts: Jović 5	Arena: Aleksandar Nikolić Hall; Attendance: 5,000; Referees: Belošević, Vojinović, Jevtović

22 May 2017 10	Dynamic	83–87(OT)	Partizan	Belgrade
19:00	Scoring by quarter: 20–26, 18–24, 22–10, 13–13, Overtime: 10–14
	Pts: Brooks 31	Report	Pts: Andrić 17	Arena: Dynamic Arena; Attendance: 500; Referees: Obrknežević, Nikolić, Arsenijević

25 May 2017 11	Partizan	100–80	Spartak	Belgrade
19:30	Scoring by quarter: 27–15, 26–19, 29–22, 18–24
	Pts: Luković 20	Report	Pts: Tresač, Kesar 19	Arena: Aleksandar Nikolić Hall; Attendance: 500

28 May 2017 12	Borac	73–76	Partizan	Čačak
19:00	Scoring by quarter: 19–17, 18–22, 14–21, 22–16
	Pts: A. Todorović 15	Report	Pts: Birčević 15	Arena: Borac Hall; Attendance: 2,500; Referees: Obrknežević, Nikolić, Arsenijević

31 May 2017 13	FMP	71–85	Partizan	Belgrade
21:00	Scoring by quarter: 11–22, 17–25, 25–17, 18–21
	Pts: Apić 15	Report	Pts: Hatcher 18	Arena: Železnik Hall; Attendance: 600; Referees: Vojinović, Juras, Glišić

3 June 2017 14	Partizan	98–102	Mega Leks	Belgrade
18:00	Scoring by quarter: 21–23, 21–22, 27–27, 29–30
	Pts: Hatcher, Birčević 20	Report	Pts: Mushidi 24	Arena: Aleksandar Nikolić Hall; Attendance: 800; Referees: Nešković, Maričić, Ninković

=== Playoffs ===
Semifinals

7 June 2017 SF 1	Partizan	91–96 (Series: 0–1)	FMP	Belgrade
21:00	Scoring by quarter: 14–18, 26–19, 17–31, 34–28
	Pts: Veličković 27; Rebs: Veličković 5 Asts: Hatcher 6	Report	Pts: Čović 23; Rebs: Šešlija 8 Asts: Čović 5	Arena: Aleksandar Nikolić Hall; Attendance: 2,000; Referees: Vojinović, M. Juras, Nikolić

9 June 2017 SF 2	FMP	78–68 (Series: 2–0)	Partizan	Belgrade
21:00	Scoring by quarter: 22–17, 21–16, 21–20, 14–15
	Pts: Davidovac 19; Rebs: Davidovac 12; Asts: Čović 5	Report	Pts: Hatcher 18; Rebs: Birčević 6 Asts: Ratkovica 5	Arena: Železnik Hall; Attendance: 750; Referees: Belošević, Jovčić, Glišić

== Adriatic League ==
=== Standings ===
Pos	Team	Pld	W	L	PF	PA	PD	Pts	Qualification or relegation
1	(Serbia) Crvena zvezda mts	26	25	1	2226	1762	+464	51	Advance to the playoffs
2	(Croatia) Cedevita	26	20	6	2323	2108	+215	46	Advance to the playoffs
3	(Serbia) Partizan NIS	26	19	7	2081	1948	+133	45	Advance to the playoffs
4	(Montenegro) Budućnost VOLI	26	18	8	2136	1968	+168	44	Advance to the playoffs
5	(Bosnia and Herzegovina) Igokea	26	13	13	1950	2017	−67	39	

Source: ABA League

==== Matches ====
Win Loss

1 October 2016 1	Mornar Bar (Montenegro)	57–58	(Serbia) Partizan	Bar
19:00	Scoring by quarter: 18–10, 10–17, 15–15, 14–16
	Pts: Jones 14; Rebs: Ellis 8 Asts: Jones 3	Boxscore	Pts: Hatcher 11; Rebs: Marinković 7 Asts: Hatcher, Majstorović 3	Arena: Topolica Sport Hall; Attendance: 3,000

4 October 2016 2	MZT Skopje (North Macedonia)	62–93	(Serbia) Partizan	Skopje
17:00	Scoring by quarter: 16–29, 9–19, 21–22, 16–23
	Pts: Thames 20; Rebs: Massey 12; Asts: Thames 6	Boxscore	Pts: Hatcher 21; Rebs: Luković 5 Asts: Hatcher 9	Arena: Jane Sandanski Arena; Attendance: 4,737

7 October 2016 3	Partizan (Serbia)	87–81	(Croatia) Cibona	Belgrade
19:00	Scoring by quarter: 25–21, 23–21, 22–15, 17–24
	Pts: Hatcher 25; Rebs: Birčević 8 Asts: Hatcher 6	Boxscore	Pts: Šakić 28; Rebs: Šakić 8 Asts: Rozić, Johnson 4	Arena: Hall Aleksandar Nikolić; Attendance: 7,000

10 October 2016 4	Karpoš Sokoli (North Macedonia)	77–84	(Serbia) Partizan	Skopje
18:00	Scoring by quarter: 20–22, 21–20, 20–20, 16–22
	Pts: Zeković, Labović 15; Rebs: Zeković, Labović 5 Asts: Perry 6	Boxscore	Pts: Hatcher 21; Rebs: Veličković 7 Asts: Veličković 4	Arena: Boris Trajkovski Sports Center; Attendance: 1,000

16 October 2016 5	Partizan (Serbia)	86–85(OT)	(Slovenia) Union Olimpija	Belgrade
17:00	Scoring by quarter: 20–22, 21–20, 17–21, 17–12, Overtime: 11-10
	Pts: Hatcher 20; Rebs: Luković 8 Asts: Hatcher 4	Boxscore	Pts: Janković 21; Rebs: Janković 12; Asts: Jefferson 5	Arena: Hall Aleksandar Nikolić; Attendance: 5,000

23 October 2016 6	FMP (Serbia)	56–65	(Serbia) Partizan	Belgrade
12:00	Scoring by quarter: 15–15, 17–16, 6–22, 18–12
	Pts: Čović 10; Rebs: Lazarević 6 Asts: Čović 4	Boxscore	Pts: Hatcher 20; Rebs: Veličković, Vrabac 6 Asts: Hatcher 5	Arena: Železnik Hall; Attendance: 500

29 October 2016 7	Partizan (Serbia)	61–64	(Montenegro) Budućnost VOLI	Belgrade
21:00	Scoring by quarter: 11–18, 26–12, 9–15, 15–19
	Pts: Veličković 15; Rebs: Veličković 9 Asts: Ratkovica 4	Boxscore	Pts: Williams 13; Rebs: James 9 Asts: Williams, Popović, Subotić 3	Arena: Sports Hall Ranko Žeravica; Attendance: 5,000

7 November 2016 8	Crvena zvezda (Serbia)	83–72	(Serbia) Partizan	Belgrade
21:00	Scoring by quarter: 20–23, 28–16, 22–14, 13–19
	Pts: Jenkins 19; Rebs: Mitrović 10; Asts: Jović 7	Boxscore	Pts: Hatcher 16; Rebs: Veličković 7 Asts: Hatcher 4	Arena: Hall Aleksandar Nikolić; Attendance: 5,678

12 November 2016 9	Partizan (Serbia)	87–97	(Croatia) Cedevita	Belgrade
21:00	Scoring by quarter: 23–22, 28–27, 15–24, 21–24
	Pts: Veličković 20; Rebs: Veličković, Marinković 6 Asts: Hatcher 6	Boxscore	Pts: Jackson 32; Rebs: Bilan 9 Asts: Jackson 9	Arena: Hall Aleksandar Nikolić; Attendance: 4,500

19 November 2016 10	Zadar (Croatia)	69–76	(Serbia) Partizan	Zadar
19:00	Scoring by quarter: 20–22, 18–17, 19–20, 12–17
	Pts: Barać 24; Rebs: Vladović, Ramljak, Krajina, Brzoja 4 Asts: Vladović 8	Boxscore	Pts: Birčević 15; Rebs: Luković 8 Asts: Marinković 3	Arena: Krešimir Ćosić Hall; Attendance: 7,000

26 November 2016 11	Partizan (Serbia)	86–79	(Serbia) Mega Leks	Belgrade
19:00	Scoring by quarter: 20–26, 22–16, 20–15, 24–22
	Pts: Hatcher 16; Rebs: Luković 10; Asts: Hatcher, Marinković, Andrić 3	Boxscore	Pts: Jaramaz 16; Rebs: Kaba 8 Asts: Novak, Jaramaz Zagorac 5	Arena: Hall Aleksandar Nikolić; Attendance: 3,000

3 December 2016 12	Krka (Slovenia)	70–82	(Serbia) Partizan	Novo Mesto
19:00	Scoring by quarter: 20–25, 14–16, 17–16, 19–25
	Pts: Rebec 18; Rebs: Dimec 8 Asts: Rebec 10	Boxscore	Pts: Veličković 18; Rebs: Robinson 7 Asts: Hatcher 5	Arena: Leon Štukelj Hall; Attendance: 1,500

10 December 2016 13	Partizan (Serbia)	87–64	(Bosnia and Herzegovina) Igokea	Belgrade
21:00	Scoring by quarter: 20–15, 7–18, 32–14, 28–17
	Pts: Hatcher 21; Rebs: Birčević 10; Asts: Ratkovica 9	Boxscore	Pts: Radivojević 15; Rebs: Robinson, Radivojević 7 Asts: Albijanić, Radivojević Pašajlić 3	Arena: Hall Aleksandar Nikolić; Attendance: 2,300

18 December 2016 14	Partizan (Serbia)	90–85	(Montenegro) Mornar Bar	Belgrade
12:30	Scoring by quarter: 18–22, 21–22, 32–21, 19–20
	Pts: Hatcher 17; Rebs: Birčević 8 Asts: Ratkovica, Robinson 3	Boxscore	Pts: Tatum 20; Rebs: Čalić 6 Asts: Bakić 12	Arena: Hall Aleksandar Nikolić; Attendance: 4,600

24 December 2016 15	Partizan (Serbia)	91–76	(North Macedonia) MZT Skopje	Belgrade
19:00	Scoring by quarter: 24–24, 23–18, 16–14, 28–20
	Pts: Veličković 21; Rebs: Vrabac 9 Asts: Vrabac 6	Boxscore	Pts: Sinovec 20; Rebs: Scott 11; Asts: Sinovec 6	Arena: Hall Aleksandar Nikolić; Attendance: 4,000

30 December 2016 16	Cibona (Croatia)	77–82	(Serbia) Partizan	Zagreb
19:00	Scoring by quarter: 17–16, 19–22, 16–28, 25–16
	Pts: Slavica 21; Rebs: Reynolds 7 Asts: Reynolds 9	Boxscore	Pts: Hatcher 19; Rebs: Luković 8 Asts: Hatcher 6	Arena: Dražen Petrović Basketball Hall; Attendance: 2,500

7 January 2017 17	Partizan (Serbia)	76–72	(North Macedonia) Karpoš Sokoli	Belgrade
21:00	Scoring by quarter: 21–17, 13–14, 26–16, 16–25
	Pts: Veličković 17; Rebs: Veličković, Vrabac, Birčević 8 Asts: Vrabac 4	Boxscore	Pts: Trajkovski 19; Rebs: Vrkić 7 Asts: Mavra 7	Arena: Hall Aleksandar Nikolić; Attendance: 5,000

15 January 2017 18	Union Olimpija (Slovenia)	74–68	(Serbia) Partizan	Ljubljana
19:00	Scoring by quarter: 24–16, 14–17, 8–20, 28–15
	Pts: Jefferson 20; Rebs: Oliver 10; Asts: Hrovat 7	Boxscore	Pts: Vrabac 17; Rebs: Birčević 12; Asts: Hatcher, Vrabac, Andrić, Veličković 3	Arena: Tivoli Hall; Attendance: 3,000

21 January 2017 19	Partizan (Serbia)	97–70	(Serbia) FMP	Belgrade
19:00	Scoring by quarter: 24–19, 30–18, 19–19, 24–14
	Pts: Ratkovica 21; Rebs: Veličković, Luković, Birčević 6 Asts: Veličković 7	Boxscore	Pts: Čović 15; Rebs: Austin 6 Asts: Čović 8	Arena: Hall Aleksandar Nikolić; Attendance: 4,500

28 January 2017 20	Budućnost VOLI (Montenegro)	74–68	(Serbia) Partizan	Podgorica
19:00	Scoring by quarter: 23–17, 17–14, 18–20, 16–17
	Pts: Reynolds 19; Rebs: Klassen 10; Asts: Williams 9	Boxscore	Pts: Veličković 15; Rebs: Luković 10; Asts: Ratkovica 7	Arena: Morača Sports Center; Attendance: 4,600

5 February 2017 21	Partizan (Serbia)	86–81	(Serbia) Crvena zvezda	Belgrade
18:00	Scoring by quarter: 21–17, 25–29, 21–26, 19–9
	Pts: Hatcher 20; Rebs: Birčević 9 Asts: Hatcher 5	Boxscore	Pts: Mitrović 14; Rebs: Mitrović 11; Asts: Jović, Jenkins 5	Arena: Hall Aleksandar Nikolić; Attendance: 6,500

12 February 2017 22	Cedevita (Croatia)	79–67	(Serbia) Partizan	Zagreb
19:00	Scoring by quarter: 16–18, 21–12, 22–12, 20–25
	Pts: Boatright 21; Rebs: Bilan 10; Asts: Tomas 4	Boxscore	Pts: Birčević 18; Rebs: Birčević 7 Asts: Ratkovica, Hatcher 3	Arena: Dom Sportova; Attendance: 3,050

24 February 2017 23	Partizan (Serbia)	87–86	(Croatia) Zadar	Belgrade
18:00	Scoring by quarter: 23–20, 24–24, 18–17, 22–25
	Pts: Birčević 26; Rebs: Majstorović 8 Asts: Robinson 6	Boxscore	Pts: Barać 27; Rebs: Marinković 9 Asts: Ramljak 6	Arena: Hall Aleksandar Nikolić; Attendance: 3,800

27 February 2017 24	Mega Leks (Serbia)	80–87	(Serbia) Partizan	Sremska Mitrovica
21:00	Scoring by quarter: 24–26, 19–21, 19–21, 18–19
	Pts: Kaba 18; Rebs: Kaba, Marelja 6 Asts: Rebić 5	Boxscore	Pts: Birčević, Andrić 20; Rebs: Birčević, Vrabac 8 Asts: Pot 8	Arena: Pinki Hall; Attendance: 3,000

5 March 2017 25	Partizan (Serbia)	94–80	(Slovenia) Krka	Belgrade
17:00	Scoring by quarter: 21–27, 25–17, 30–16, 18–20
	Pts: Pot 16; Rebs: Birčević 7 Asts: Vrabac 8	Boxscore	Pts: Dimec 19; Rebs: Dimec 11; Asts: Čebular 7	Arena: Hall Aleksandar Nikolić; Attendance: 3,200

11 March 2017 26	Igokea (Bosnia and Herzegovina)	70–64	(Serbia) Partizan	Laktaši
17:00	Scoring by quarter: 28–17, 16–17, 9–16, 17–14
	Pts: Radivojević 20; Rebs: Rikić 7 Asts: Albijanić 3	Boxscore	Pts: Ratkovica 14; Rebs: Luković 10; Asts: Pot, Veličković 3	Arena: Laktaši Sports Hall; Attendance: 3,000

=== Playoffs ===
==== Semifinals ====
18 March 2017 SF 1	Cedevita (Croatia)	83–76	(Serbia) Partizan	Zagreb
19:00	Scoring by quarter: 25–17, 29–18, 16–24, 13–17
	Pts: Shurna 15; Rebs: Begić 10; Asts: Boatright 4	Boxscore	Pts: Hatcher 18; Rebs: Veličković 8 Asts: Hatcher 7	Arena: Dom Sportova 2 Attendance: 3,000

25 March 2017 SF 2	Partizan (Serbia)	74–73	(Croatia) Cedevita	Belgrade
20:00	Scoring by quarter: 20–13, 19–21, 17–17, 18–22
	Pts: Hatcher 23; Rebs: Birčević 11; Asts: Hatcher, Gordon 4	Boxscore	Pts: Boatright 25; Rebs: Bilan 10; Asts: Babić 5	Arena: Hall Aleksandar Nikolić; Attendance: 7,500

2 April 2017 SF 3	Cedevita (Croatia)	87–78	(Serbia) Partizan	Zagreb
19:00	Scoring by quarter: 20–14, 27–22, 22–27, 18–15
	Pts: Musa, Bilan 16; Rebs: Bilan 7 Asts: Katić 7	Boxscore	Pts: Hatcher 16; Rebs: Birčević 11; Asts: Hatcher 7	Arena: Dom Sportova 2 Attendance: 3,000

== Kup Radivoja Koraća ==
Quarterfinals

17 February 2017	Partizan	80–60	Dunav	Niš
19:30 CET	Scoring by quarter: 18–18, 23–5, 23–20, 16–17
	Pts: Andrić 17; Rebs: Tanasković 11; Asts: Ratkovica, Pot 5	Report	Pts: Zorčić 19; Rebs: three players 8 Asts: Nenadić, Sočanac 3 PIR: Zorčić 22	Arena: Čair Sports Center; Attendance: 4,000

Semifinals

18 February 2017	Mega Leks	65–77	Partizan	Niš
21:00 CET	Scoring by quarter: 14–20, 22–19, 13–23, 16–15
	Pts: Jaramaz 23; Rebs: Kaba 12; Asts: three players 2	Report	Pts: Veličković 19; Rebs: Luković 13; Asts: Ratkovica 8	Arena: Čair Sports Center; Attendance: 4,500

Final

19 February 2017	Crvena zvezda	74–64	Partizan	Niš
21:00 CET	Scoring by quarter: 23–23, 13–11, 16–13, 22–17
	Pts: Simonović, Gudurić 18; Rebs: Thompson 6 Asts: Jović 7	Report	Pts: Vrabac 12; Rebs: Veličković 7 Asts: Pot 4	Arena: Čair Sports Center; Attendance: 4,500; Referees: Ilija Belošević, Milivoje Jovčić, Milija Vojinović

== Champions League ==
=== League table ===
Pos	Team	Pld	W	L	PF	PA	PD	Pts	Qualification	BJK	AEK	PAR	LUD	DSS	SPI	ZGA	SZO
1	(Turkey) Beşiktaş Sompo Japan	14	12	2	1178	1050	+128	26	Advance to round of 16	—	82–68	77–62	88–85	100–70	68–66	85–66	89–74
2	(Greece) AEK Athens	14	9	5	1107	992	+115	23	Advance to qualifiers	78–88	—	91–81	82–72	78–58	89–69	71–64	92–49
3	(Serbia) Partizan NIS	14	8	6	1038	1046	−8	22	Advance to qualifiers	86–71	65–69	—	86–82	87–88	70–84	58–56	77–67
4	(Germany) MHP Riesen Ludwigsburg	14	8	6	1150	1058	+92	22	Advance to qualifiers	89–83	72–67	64–65	—	75–78	88–66	87–77	99–56
5	(Italy) Dinamo Sassari	14	7	7	1099	1108	−9	21	Advance to qualifiers	74–75	80–78	99–85	79–80	—	95–75	74–70	97–88
6	(Belgium) Proximus Spirou	14	6	8	1040	1113	−73	20	Transfer to FIBA Europe Cup	75–92	58–80	63–65	78–96	63–57	—	86–69	92–87
7	(Poland) Stelmet Zielona Góra	14	4	10	1020	1084	−64	18	Transfer to FIBA Europe Cup	66–84	78–75	80–81	72–70	81–78	83–86	—	83–63
8	(Hungary) Szolnoki Olaj	14	2	12	1020	1201	−181	16		91–96	76–89	55–70	81–91	73–72	74–79	86–75	—

Source: Basketball Champions League

=== Regular season ===
Win Loss

19 October 2016 1	Ludwigsburg (Germany)	64–65	(Serbia) Partizan	Ludwigsburg
20:00	Scoring by quarter: 16–18, 14–14, 16–20, 18–13
	Pts: Martin 14; Rebs: Thiemann 9 Asts: Washpun 5	Boxscore	Pts: Birčević 15; Rebs: Birčević 5 Asts: Ratkovica 5	Arena: Arena Ludwigsburg; Referees: Conde (ESP), Difallah (FRA), Maciulaitis (LTU)

26 October 2016 2	Beşiktaş (Turkey)	77–62	(Serbia) Partizan	Istanbul
18:00	Scoring by quarter: 21–16, 14–15, 25–14, 17–17
	Pts: Roll 16; Rebs: Štimac 9 Asts: Weems 7	Boxscore	Pts: Birčević 15; Rebs: Robinson 6 Asts: Hatcher 5	Arena: BJK Akatlar Arena; Referees: Chambon (FRA), Cici (ALB), Zashchuk (UKR)

1 November 2016 3	Partizan (Serbia)	58–56	(Poland) Zielona Góra	Belgrade
18:00	Scoring by quarter: 17–17, 18–15, 6–13, 17–11
	Pts: Veličković 15; Rebs: Veličković, Birčević 7 Asts: Ratkovica 4	Boxscore	Pts: Florence 16; Rebs: Moore 6 Asts: Koszarek 4	Arena: Hall Aleksandar Nikolić; Referees: Biricik (TUR), Baldini (ITA), Rosso (ITA)

9 November 2016 4	Szolnoki Olaj (Hungary)	55–70	(Serbia) Partizan	Szolnok
18:00	Scoring by quarter: 16–20, 16–13, 14–20, 9–17
	Pts: Vojvoda 21; Rebs: Vojvoda 7 Asts: Vojvoda, Wittmann, Kinney 3	Boxscore	Pts: Birčević 17; Rebs: Luković 9 Asts: Ratkovica 11	Arena: Tiszaligeti Sportcsarnok; Referees: Poursanidis (GRE), Baldini (ITA), Maestre (FRA)

15 November 2016 5	Partizan (Serbia)	70–84	(Belgium) Spirou	Belgrade
20:00	Scoring by quarter: 16–22, 24–27, 21–18, 9–17
	Pts: Marinković, Ratkovica 15; Rebs: Luković, Birčević, Robinson 6 Asts: Ratkovica 5	Boxscore	Pts: Bowman, Richardson 16; Rebs: Davis 7 Asts: Marnegrave 7	Arena: Hall Aleksandar Nikolić; Referees: Conde (ESP), Uuehendrik (EST), Yilmaz (TUR)

23 November 2016 6	AEK Athens (Greece)	91–81	(Serbia) Partizan	Athens
19:00 (EET)	Scoring by quarter: 22–14, 20–19, 22–29, 27–19
	Pts: Šakota 19; Rebs: Falker 6 Asts: Ukić 6	Boxscore	Pts: Hatcher 18; Rebs: Birčević 11; Asts: Ratkovica 7	Arena: Nikos Galis Olympic Indoor Hall; Referees: Maestre (FRA), Chebyshev (UKR), Horozov (BUL)

29 November 2016 7	Partizan (Serbia)	87–88(OT)	(Italy) Dinamo Sassari	Belgrade
20:30	Scoring by quarter: 19–23, 27–15, 17–22, 16–19, Overtime: 8–9
	Pts: Hatcher 23; Rebs: Veličković, Andrić 6 Asts: Robinson 7	Boxscore	Pts: Carter 21; Rebs: Lacey 7 Asts: Lacey 7	Arena: Hall Aleksandar Nikolić; Referees: Cmikiewichz (POL), Difallah (FRA), Manos (GRE)

6 December 2016 8	Partizan (Serbia)	86–82(OT)	(Germany) Ludwigsburg	Belgrade
18:00	Scoring by quarter: 21–12, 16–23, 19–23, 16–14, Overtime: 14–10
	Pts: Veličković 21; Rebs: Birčević 12; Asts: Hatcher 6	Boxscore	Pts: Cotton 14; Rebs: Hammonds 8 Asts: Martin 5	Arena: Hall Aleksandar Nikolić; Referees: Sahin (ITA), Calatrava Cuevas (ESP), Shulga (UKR)

14 December 2016 9	Partizan (Serbia)	86–71	(Turkey) Beşiktaş	Belgrade
20:30	Scoring by quarter: 18–16, 26–25, 20–23, 22–7
	Pts: Veličković 20; Rebs: Luković 7 Asts: Hatcher 7	Boxscore	Pts: Clark 17; Rebs: Clark 7 Asts: Thompson 5	Arena: Hall Aleksandar Nikolić; Referees: Jasevicius (LTU), Lanzarini (ITA), Lucis (LAT)

20 December 2016 10	Zielona Góra (Poland)	80–81(OT)	(Serbia) Partizan	Zielona Góra
18:30	Scoring by quarter: 20–18, 15–12, 19–18, 14–20, Overtime: 12–13
	Pts: Koszarek 17; Rebs: Dragičević 10; Asts: Koszarek 4	Boxscore	Pts: Birčević 19; Rebs: Birčević 11; Asts: Ratkovica 10	Arena: CRS Hall Zielona Góra; Referees: Martolini (ITA), Chebyshev (UKR), Maciulaitis (LTU)

4 January 2017 11	Partizan (Serbia)	77–67	(Hungary) Szolnoki Olaj	Belgrade
20:00	Scoring by quarter: 17–15, 18–10, 20–25, 22–17
	Pts: Luković 14; Rebs: Vrabac 8 Asts: Hatcher 6	Boxscore	Pts: Vojvoda 21; Rebs: Barnies 8 Asts: Vojvoda 5	Arena: Hall Aleksandar Nikolić; Referees: Cmikiewicz (POL), Kukelcik (SVK), Stoica (ROU)

10 January 2017 12	Spirou (Belgium)	63–65	(Serbia) Partizan	Charleroi
20:30	Scoring by quarter: 20–14, 14–16, 17–14, 12–21
	Pts: Shepherd 17; Rebs: Bowman 8 Asts: Libert 5	Boxscore	Pts: Andrić 14; Rebs: Vrabac 6 Asts: Hatcher 5	Arena: Spiroudome; Referees: Chambon (FRA), Arana (ESP), Mattioli (ITA)

18 January 2017 13	Partizan (Serbia)	65–69	(Greece) AEK Athens	Belgrade
20:00	Scoring by quarter: 11–19, 22–22, 20–14, 12–14
	Pts: Birčević 16; Rebs: Birčević 8 Asts: Ratkovica 5	Boxscore	Pts: Larentzakis 14; Rebs: Milošević 9 Asts: Ukić 8	Arena: Hall Aleksandar Nikolić; Referees: Sahin (ITA), Gurion (ISR), Ozols (LAT)

25 January 2017 14	Dinamo Sassari (Italy)	99–85	(Serbia) Partizan	Sassari
18:00	Scoring by quarter: 19–22, 32–20, 21–21, 27–22
	Pts: Stipčević 23; Rebs: Lawal 8 Asts: Lacey 6	Boxscore	Pts: Birčević 17; Rebs: Majstorović 5 Asts: Pot 9	Arena: Palasport Roberta Serradimigni; Referees: Conde (ESP), Maestre (FRA), Sukys (LTU)

=== Play-offs qualifiers ===
Win Loss

8 February 2017 1	PAOK (Greece)	74–76	(Serbia) Partizan	Thessaloniki
20:00	Scoring by quarter: 14–22, 18–18, 24–13, 18–23
	Pts: McFadden 20; Rebs: Clanton 11; Asts: McFadden 4	Boxscore	Pts: Hatcher 27; Rebs: Birčević, Luković 6 Asts: Hatcher 4	Arena: PAOK Sports Arena; Attendance: 6,000; Referees: Bultó (ESP), Difallah (FRA), Lanzarini (ITA)

22 February 2017 2	Partizan (Serbia)	78–82	(Greece) PAOK	Belgrade
18:30	Scoring by quarter: 16–18, 16–29, 18–17, 28–18
	Pts: Veličković 19; Rebs: Luković 9 Asts: Pot 6	Boxscore	Pts: McFadden 26; Rebs: Clanton 10; Asts: McFadden 7	Arena: Hall Aleksandar Nikolić; Attendance: 8,000; Referees: Viator (FRA), Miguel Castillo Larroca (ESP), Zashchuk (UKR)

== Individual awards ==
Basketball Champions League

BCL Star Lineup Second Best Team

- (United States) Will Hatcher

BCL Game Day MVP

- (Serbia) Novica Veličković – Regular Season, Round 9

Adriatic League

All-ABA League Team

- (Serbia) Novica Veličković

MVP of the Month

- (Serbia) Stefan Birčević – February 2017

MVP of the Round

- (United States) Will Hatcher – Round 2
- (Serbia) Stefan Birčević – Round 23
- (Serbia) Stefan Birčević – Semi-finals, Game 2

Basketball League of Serbia

MVP of the Round

- (Serbia) Branislav Ratkovica – Round 9

== Statistics ==
=== Basketball Champions League ===
#	Player	GP	MPG	FG%	3FG%	FT%	RPG	APG	SPG	BPG	PPG	EFF
5	(United States) Frank Robinson	12	19.2	36.7	36.0	70	3.6	2.2	0.8	0.3	5.8	7.5
6	(Serbia) Branislav Ratkovica	14	18.3	47.9	34.3	77.3	1.9	4.7	0.6	0.1	8.3	8.4
7	(Bosnia and Herzegovina) Adin Vrabac	15	21.7	54.2	33.3	68.8	2.9	1.5	0.7	0.1	5.6	6.8
8	(Serbia) Slobodan Jovanović	2	6	54.2	0.0	50	0.0	0.5	0.0	0.0	1.5	1.5
9	(Serbia) Vanja Marinković	12	22.2	54.2	47.2	45.7	2.3	0.8	0.3	0.3	7.5	7
10	(Serbia) Nikola Tanasković	0	0.0	0.0	0.0	0.0	0.0	0.0	0.0	0.0	0.0	0.0
12	(Serbia) Novica Veličković	10	22	60.3	20.8	86.1	5.9	1.5	1.3	0.4	12.8	14.8
13	(Serbia) Đorđe Majstorović	6	14.6	26.7	0.0	66.7	3.2	0.3	0.3	0.7	2	1.8
14	(Serbia) Stefan Birčević	16	26.9	59.6	40.4	63.2	6.2	1.3	0.5	0.9	12.1	13.5
15	(Serbia) Miloš Koprivica	14	3.3	54.3	0.0	66.7	1.6	0.3	0.1	0.1	3.3	3.1
21	(Serbia) Mihajlo Andrić	14	23	40	37.5	94.1	2	0.6	0.6	0.1	6.4	6.1
25	(United States) Will Hatcher	14	27.9	43.2	27	75	1.9	4.2	1.1	0.0	13.1	9.7
33	(Serbia) Stefan Pot	8	16.7	40.9	33.3	73.7	2.4	2.5	0.8	0.1	4.8	6.1
43	(Bosnia and Herzegovina) Kenan Karahodžić	12	11.4	62.5	33.3	73.7	2.9	0.2	0.5	0.4	2.8	4.3
44	(United States) Jamont Gordon	0	0.0	0.0	0.0	0.0	0.0	0.0	0.0	0.0	0.0	0.0
55	(Serbia) Uroš Luković	15	18.1	58.3	0.0	43.9	5.5	0.3	0.4	1.8	6.8	10.3

=== Adriatic League ===
#	Player	GP	MPG	FG%	3FG%	FT%	RPG	APG	SPG	BPG	PPG	EFF
5	(United States) Frank Robinson	23	15.6	44.8	28.9	60.7	2.2	1.7	0.6	0.5	4.7	3.3
6	(Serbia) Branislav Ratkovica	26	17.1	58.6	31.6	88.6	1.1	2.8	0.7	0.2	6.9	6
7	(Bosnia and Herzegovina) Adin Vrabac	29	15.9	55.7	22.7	38.5	3.6	1.5	0.6	0.2	4.9	5.2
8	(Serbia) Slobodan Jovanović	3	4.7	0.0	0.0	0.0	0.6	0	0.3	0	0	0
9	(Serbia) Vanja Marinković	23	26.7	44.1	41.4	80.6	2.7	1.5	0.6	0.4	8.2	7.6
10	(Serbia) Nikola Tanasković	3	9	0	0	0	0.3	0.7	0.3	0	0	-0.7
12	(Serbia) Novica Veličković	26	22.6	46.9	22.6	83.2	5.5	1.9	0.5	0.8	11.2	11.8
13	(Serbia) Đorđe Majstorović	19	14.1	60.8	23.1	68.4	2.5	0.7	0.2	0.6	4.4	1.8
14	(Serbia) Stefan Birčević	28	26.7	56.4	43	75.9	6.2	0.9	0.7	1	11.9	13.9
15	(Serbia) Miloš Koprivica	20	7.4	58.3	0.0	71.4	0.8	0.4	0.1	0.2	2.6	0.9
21	(Serbia) Mihajlo Andrić	28	20.6	72.2	40.6	81.8	2.4	1.3	0.5	0.3	6.7	6.4
25	(United States) Will Hatcher	26	29.2	50.4	36.6	83.5	1.6	3.9	0.7	0.2	15.4	14.2
33	(Serbia) Stefan Pot	14	14.4	50	33.3	73.1	1.9	2.2	0.7	0.1	5.3	5.5
43	(Bosnia and Herzegovina) Kenan Karahodžić	10	7.5	50	11.1	50	0.9	0.3	0.4	0.6	1.4	0.4
44	(United States) Jamont Gordon	6	15.8	41.2	21.4	50	1.8	1.5	0.2	0.2	4.5	2.2
55	(Serbia) Uroš Luković	29	15.4	57.3	0.0	57.1	5.3	0.2	0.3	2	7.9	11
