= 2017 ABA League Playoffs =

The 2017 ABA League Playoffs is the play-off tournament that decides the winner of the 2016–17 ABA League season. The playoffs started on March 18, 2017, and ended on April 13, 2017. The winner of the play-offs qualifies for the 2017–18 EuroLeague.

== Bracket ==
Semifinals; 18 March – 4 April
(Serbia) Crvena zvezda mts	2
(Montenegro) Budućnost VOLI	1
(Croatia) Cedevita	2
(Serbia) Partizan NIS	1

Finals; 10 April – 13 April
(Serbia) Crvena zvezda mts	3
(Croatia) Cedevita	0

== Semifinals ==
=== Game 1 ===
18 March 2017	Cedevita (Croatia)	83–76 (Series: 1–0)	(Serbia) Partizan NIS	Zagreb
19:00 (CET)	Scoring by quarter: 25–17, 29–18, 16–24, 13–17
	Pts: Shurna 15; Rebs: Begić 10; Asts: Boatright 4 PIR: Begić 20	Report	Pts: Hatcher 18; Rebs: Veličković 8 Asts: Hatcher 7 PIR: Veličković 20	Arena: Dom Sportova 2 Attendance: 3,000; Referees: (Slovenia) Matej Boltauzer (Montenegro) Miloš Koljenšić (North Macedonia) Igor Mitrovski

Starters:			Pts	Reb	Ast
PG	3	(United States) Ryan Boatright	11	2	4
PG	0	(United States) Ra'Shad James	9	2	3
F	33	(Croatia) Marko Tomas	2	2	1
PF	11	(Croatia) Karlo Žganec	7	1	0
C	15	(Croatia) Miro Bilan	13	9	2
Reserves:					
SG	2	(Croatia) Filip Krušlin	7	1	1
PG	6	(Croatia) Toni Katić	11	0	1
SG	9	(Croatia) Luka Babić	1	3	2
SF	13	(Bosnia and Herzegovina) Džanan Musa	DNP		
F	22	(United States) John Shurna	15	6	0
C	25	(Slovenia) Mirza Begić	7	10	0
F/C	35	(Croatia) Marko Arapović	DNP		
Head coach:
(Croatian Basketball Federation) Veljko Mršić

Cedevita	Partizan

Starters:			Pts	Reb	Ast
PG	25	(United States) Will Hatcher	18	0	7
SG	44	(United States) Jamont Gordon	11	2	0
SG	9	(Serbia) Vanja Marinković	4	1	0
PF	14	(Serbia) Stefan Birčević	8	4	1
C	55	(Serbia) Uroš Luković	0	0	0
Reserves:					
SF	5	(United States) Frank Robinson	7	4	1
PG	6	(Serbia) Branislav Ratkovica	7	2	0
SF	7	(Bosnia and Herzegovina) Adin Vrabac	3	2	0
PF	12	(Serbia) Novica Veličković	14	8	2
C	13	(Serbia) Đorđe Majstorović	4	1	0
C	15	(Serbia) Miloš Koprivica	DNP		
SF	21	(Serbia) Mihajlo Andrić	0	0	2
Head coach:
(Basketball Federation of Serbia) Aleksandar Džikić

19 March 2017	Crvena zvezda mts (Serbia)	82–67 (Series: 1–0)	(Montenegro) Budućnost VOLI	Belgrade
19:00 (CET)	Scoring by quarter: 21–17, 22–14, 19–18, 20–18
	Pts: Simonović, Gudurić 18; Rebs: Dangubić 5 Asts: Jenkins 6 PIR: Simonović, Kuzmić 21	Report	Pts: Klassen 12; Rebs: Savović 7 Asts: Gordić 7 PIR: Vranješ 14	Arena: Hall Aleksandar Nikolić; Attendance: 5,978; Referees: (Croatia) Sreten Radović (Croatia) Siniša Herceg (Serbia) Marko Juras

Starters:			Pts	Reb	Ast
G	22	(United States) Charles Jenkins	8	3	6
G/F	23	(Serbia) Marko Gudurić	18	2	2
G/F	6	(Serbia) Nemanja Dangubić	5	5	1
PF	9	(Serbia) Luka Mitrović	0	2	3
C	32	(Serbia) Ognjen Kuzmić	14	3	2
Reserves:					
PG	0	(United States) Nate Wolters	7	1	5
F/C	2	(United States) Deon Thompson	2	2	0
G/F	10	(Serbia) Branko Lazić	2	3	3
G/F	13	(Serbia) Ognjen Dobrić	0	0	0
F	19	(Serbia) Marko Simonović	18	2	1
G/F	20	(Serbia) Petar Rakićević	0	0	0
F/C	51	(Montenegro) Milko Bjelica	8	1	3
Head coach:
(Basketball Federation of Montenegro) Dejan Radonjić

Crvena zvezda	Budućnost

Starters:			Pts	Reb	Ast
PG	3	(United States) Marcus Williams	4	2	2
PG	30	(Montenegro) Petar Popović	5	0	3
G/F	4	(Montenegro) Suad Šehović	7	6	1
F/C	14	(Montenegro) Boris Savović	7	7	0
C	19	(Montenegro) Zoran Nikolić	4	1	0
Reserves:					
PG	2	(United States) J. R. Reynolds	3	0	3
F/C	7	(Montenegro) Bojan Subotić	5	2	0
G/F	8	(Montenegro) Sead Šehović	2	3	1
PG	10	(Bosnia and Herzegovina) Nemanja Gordić	4	2	7
F	13	(Montenegro) Aleksa Ilić	3	3	0
PF	15	(Canada) Owen Klassen	12	6	0
G	41	(Montenegro) Nemanja Vranješ	11	3	0
Head coach:
(Hellenic Basketball Federation) Ilias Zouros

=== Game 2 ===
25 March 2017	Partizan NIS (Serbia)	74–73 (Series: 1–1)	(Croatia) Cedevita	Belgrade
20:00 (CET)	Scoring by quarter: 20–13, 19–21, 17–17, 18–22
	Pts: Hatcher 23; Rebs: Birčević 11; Asts: Hatcher, Gordon 4 PIR: Birčević 29	Report	Pts: Boatright 25; Rebs: Bilan 10; Asts: Babić 5 PIR: Boatright 23	Arena: Hall Aleksandar Nikolić; Attendance: 7,500; Referees: (Serbia) Milivoje Jovčić (Slovenia) Sašo Petek (Slovenia) Mario Majkić

Starters:			Pts	Reb	Ast
PG	25	(United States) Will Hatcher	23	1	4
SG	44	(United States) Jamont Gordon	3	2	4
SG	9	(Serbia) Vanja Marinković	5	1	1
PF	14	(Serbia) Stefan Birčević	18	11	0
C	55	(Serbia) Uroš Luković	6	4	0
Reserves:					
SF	5	(United States) Frank Robinson	0	0	0
PG	6	(Serbia) Branislav Ratkovica	2	0	1
SF	7	(Bosnia and Herzegovina) Adin Vrabac	2	1	1
PF	12	(Serbia) Novica Veličković	8	10	2
C	13	(Serbia) Đorđe Majstorović	0	2	0
C	15	(Serbia) Miloš Koprivica	4	1	0
SF	21	(Serbia) Mihajlo Andrić	3	0	1
Head coach:
(Basketball Federation of Serbia) Aleksandar Džikić

Partizan	Cedevita

Starters:			Pts	Reb	Ast
PG	3	(United States) Ryan Boatright	25	3	2
SG	9	(Croatia) Luka Babić	0	1	5
F	33	(Croatia) Marko Tomas	5	2	2
PF	11	(Croatia) Karlo Žganec	2	1	1
C	15	(Croatia) Miro Bilan	16	10	2
Reserves:					
PG	0	(United States) Ra'Shad James	8	2	0
SG	2	(Croatia) Filip Krušlin	3	1	1
PG	6	(Croatia) Toni Katić	2	0	2
F	22	(United States) John Shurna	10	3	1
C	25	(Slovenia) Mirza Begić	2	7	0
F/C	35	(Croatia) Marko Arapović	0	0	0
Head coach:
(Croatian Basketball Federation) Veljko Mršić

28 March 2017	Budućnost VOLI (Montenegro)	63–57 (Series: 1–1)	(Serbia) Crvena zvezda mts	Podgorica
20:00 (CEST)	Scoring by quarter: 13–13, 20–10, 9–14, 21–20
	Pts: Savović 15; Rebs: Savović 11; Asts: three players 2 PIR: Savović 13	Report	Pts: Gudurić 17; Rebs: Dangubić, Lazić 5 Asts: Gudurić 2 PIR: Gudurić 17	Arena: Morača Sports Center; Attendance: 4,500; Referees: (Slovenia) Saša Pukl (Croatia) Tomislav Hordov (Serbia) Uroš Obrknežević

Starters:			Pts	Reb	Ast
PG	10	(Bosnia and Herzegovina) Nemanja Gordić	12	5	0
G/F	8	(Montenegro) Sead Šehović	6	2	2
G/F	4	(Montenegro) Suad Šehović	6	4	1
F/C	14	(Montenegro) Boris Savović	15	11	2
C	19	(Montenegro) Zoran Nikolić	3	2	1
Reserves:					
PG	2	(United States) J. R. Reynolds	7	3	1
F/C	7	(Montenegro) Bojan Subotić	2	1	1
F/C	11	(Montenegro) Vasilije Baćović	DNP		
F	13	(Montenegro) Aleksa Ilić	3	3	1
PF	15	(Canada) Owen Klassen	5	7	2
PG	30	(Montenegro) Petar Popović	4	2	0
G	41	(Montenegro) Nemanja Vranješ	DNP		
Head coach:
(Hellenic Basketball Federation) Ilias Zouros

Budućnost	Crvena zvezda

Starters:			Pts	Reb	Ast
PG	24	(Serbia) Stefan Jović	0	2	1
G	22	(United States) Charles Jenkins	5	2	1
G/F	6	(Serbia) Nemanja Dangubić	2	5	1
PF	9	(Serbia) Luka Mitrović	4	3	1
C	32	(Serbia) Ognjen Kuzmić	4	4	0
Reserves:					
PG	0	(United States) Nate Wolters	11	2	1
F/C	2	(United States) Deon Thompson	2	2	1
G/F	10	(Serbia) Branko Lazić	9	5	0
G/F	13	(Serbia) Ognjen Dobrić	DNP		
F	19	(Serbia) Marko Simonović	3	3	1
G/F	23	(Serbia) Marko Gudurić	17	2	2
F/C	51	(Montenegro) Milko Bjelica	0	1	0
Head coach:
(Basketball Federation of Montenegro) Dejan Radonjić

=== Game 3 ===
2 April 2017	Cedevita (Croatia)	87–78 (Series: 2–1)	(Serbia) Partizan NIS	Zagreb
19:00 (CEST)	Scoring by quarter: 20–14, 27–22, 22–27, 18–15
	Pts: Musa, Bilan 16; Rebs: Bilan 7 Asts: Katić 7 PIR: Bilan 21	Report	Pts: Hatcher 16; Rebs: Birčević 11; Asts: Hatcher 7 PIR: Hatcher 18	Arena: Dom Sportova 2 Attendance: 3,000; Referees: (Slovenia) Saša Pukl (Montenegro) Miloš Koljenšić (Montenegro) Igor Dragojević

Starters:			Pts	Reb	Ast
PG	3	(United States) Ryan Boatright	0	0	0
PG	0	(United States) Ra'Shad James	6	3	1
SG	9	(Croatia) Luka Babić	14	3	4
PF	11	(Croatia) Karlo Žganec	2	2	0
C	15	(Croatia) Miro Bilan	16	7	3
Reserves:					
SG	2	(Croatia) Filip Krušlin	3	1	1
PG	6	(Croatia) Toni Katić	5	2	7
SF	13	(Bosnia and Herzegovina) Džanan Musa	16	2	1
F	22	(United States) John Shurna	8	5	2
C	25	(Slovenia) Mirza Begić	4	5	0
F	33	(Croatia) Marko Tomas	7	3	0
F/C	35	(Croatia) Marko Arapović	6	1	1
Head coach:
(Croatian Basketball Federation) Veljko Mršić

Cedevita	Partizan

Starters:			Pts	Reb	Ast
PG	25	(United States) Will Hatcher	16	0	7
SG	44	(United States) Jamont Gordon	8	6	0
SF	9	(Serbia) Vanja Marinković	10	1	0
PF	14	(Serbia) Stefan Birčević	7	11	0
C	55	(Serbia) Uroš Luković	13	6	0
Reserves:					
SF	5	(United States) Frank Robinson	DNP		
PG	6	(Serbia) Branislav Ratkovica	3	0	2
SF	7	(Bosnia and Herzegovina) Adin Vrabac	0	1	0
PF	12	(Serbia) Novica Veličković	9	6	2
C	13	(Serbia) Đorđe Majstorović	0	1	0
C	15	(Serbia) Miloš Koprivica	2	0	1
SF	21	(Serbia) Mihajlo Andrić	10	3	2
Head coach:
(Basketball Federation of Serbia) Aleksandar Džikić

4 April 2017	Crvena zvezda mts (Serbia)	82–59 (Series: 2–1)	(Montenegro) Budućnost VOLI	Belgrade
19:00 (CEST)	Scoring by quarter: 21–15, 14–14, 32–22, 15–8
	Pts: Jenkins 17; Rebs: Mitrović 12; Asts: Jenkins 6 PIR: Jenkins 24	Report	Pts: Reynolds, Savović 16; Rebs: Ilić 6 Asts: Gordić 4 PIR: Savović 15	Arena: Železnik Hall; Attendance: 3,209; Referees: (Slovenia) Matej Boltauzer (Slovenia) Sašo Petek (Croatia) Josip Radojković

Starters:			Pts	Reb	Ast
G	22	(United States) Charles Jenkins	17	2	6
G/F	10	(Serbia) Branko Lazić	2	0	1
G/F	6	(Serbia) Nemanja Dangubić	5	2	1
PF	9	(Serbia) Luka Mitrović	6	12	0
C	32	(Serbia) Ognjen Kuzmić	13	10	0
Reserves:					
PG	0	(United States) Nate Wolters	7	0	2
F/C	2	(United States) Deon Thompson	DNP		
G/F	13	(Serbia) Ognjen Dobrić	0	0	0
F	19	(Serbia) Marko Simonović	14	2	1
G/F	20	(Serbia) Petar Rakićević	DNP		
G/F	23	(Serbia) Marko Gudurić	8	2	5
F/C	51	(Montenegro) Milko Bjelica	10	1	0
Head coach:
(Basketball Federation of Montenegro) Dejan Radonjić

Crvena zvezda	Budućnost

Starters:			Pts	Reb	Ast
PG	10	(Bosnia and Herzegovina) Nemanja Gordić	8	5	4
G/F	8	(Montenegro) Sead Šehović	0	0	1
G/F	4	(Montenegro) Suad Šehović	6	3	0
F/C	14	(Montenegro) Boris Savović	16	5	0
C	19	(Montenegro) Zoran Nikolić	0	1	1
Reserves:					
PG	2	(United States) J. R. Reynolds	16	1	2
F/C	7	(Montenegro) Bojan Subotić	0	0	1
F/C	11	(Montenegro) Vasilije Baćović	DNP		
F	13	(Montenegro) Aleksa Ilić	6	6	0
PF	15	(Canada) Owen Klassen	1	2	1
PG	30	(Montenegro) Petar Popović	6	2	0
G	41	(Montenegro) Nemanja Vranješ	0	1	0
Head coach:
(Hellenic Basketball Federation) Ilias Zouros

== Finals ==
=== Game 1 ===
10 April 2017	Crvena zvezda mts (Serbia)	81–66 (Series: 1–0)	(Croatia) Cedevita	Belgrade
19:00 (CEST)	Scoring by quarter: 16–27, 29–17, 21–10, 15–12
	Pts: Jenkins 20; Rebs: Wolters, Kuzmić 5 Asts: Wolters 6 PIR: Jenkins 24	Report	Pts: Tomas 14; Rebs: Bilan 6 Asts: Babić 6 PIR: Bilan 22	Arena: Hall Aleksandar Nikolić; Attendance: 5,989; Referees: (Serbia) Ilija Belošević (Croatia) Tomislav Hordov (Slovenia) Mario Majkić

Starters:			Pts	Reb	Ast
G	22	(United States) Charles Jenkins	20	2	5
G/F	10	(Serbia) Branko Lazić	2	4	2
G/F	6	(Serbia) Nemanja Dangubić	2	2	1
PF	9	(Serbia) Luka Mitrović	2	2	3
C	32	(Serbia) Ognjen Kuzmić	14	5	0
Reserves:					
PG	0	(United States) Nate Wolters	14	5	6
F/C	2	(United States) Deon Thompson	DNP		
G/F	13	(Serbia) Ognjen Dobrić	0	0	0
F	19	(Serbia) Marko Simonović	4	4	2
G/F	20	(Serbia) Petar Rakićević	DNP		
G/F	23	(Serbia) Marko Gudurić	10	2	1
F/C	51	(Montenegro) Milko Bjelica	13	2	1
Head coach:
(Basketball Federation of Montenegro) Dejan Radonjić

Crvena zvezda	Cedevita

Starters:			Pts	Reb	Ast
PG	6	(Croatia) Toni Katić	5	0	3
PG	0	(United States) Ra'Shad James	12	2	0
SG	9	(Croatia) Luka Babić	5	5	6
PF	11	(Croatia) Karlo Žganec	5	3	0
C	15	(Croatia) Miro Bilan	12	6	5
Reserves:					
F	1	(Croatia) Bajo, Darko	DNP		
SG	2	(Croatia) Filip Krušlin	6	1	1
SF	13	(Bosnia and Herzegovina) Džanan Musa	2	2	1
F	22	(United States) John Shurna	2	0	0
PF	23	(Croatia) Buljević, Lovro	DNP		
C	25	(Slovenia) Mirza Begić	3	0	0
F	33	(Croatia) Marko Tomas	14	5	0
Head coach:
(Italian Basketball Federation) Gianmarco Pozzecco

=== Game 2 ===
11 April 2017	Crvena zvezda mts (Serbia)	84–73 (Series: 2–0)	(Croatia) Cedevita	Belgrade
18:30 (CEST)	Scoring by quarter: 29–18, 28–16, 15–16, 12–23
	Pts: Jenkins 16; Rebs: Lazić 8 Asts: Wolters 5 PIR: Jenkins 23	Report	Pts: Bilan 12; Rebs: Žganec 7 Asts: four players 2 PIR: Shurna 13	Arena: Hall Aleksandar Nikolić; Attendance: 5,896; Referees: (Slovenia) Saša Pukl (Montenegro) Miloš Koljenšić (North Macedonia) Igor Mitrovski

Starters:			Pts	Reb	Ast
G	22	(United States) Charles Jenkins	16	7	4
G/F	10	(Serbia) Branko Lazić	6	8	0
G/F	6	(Serbia) Nemanja Dangubić	12	2	2
PF	9	(Serbia) Luka Mitrović	10	0	0
C	32	(Serbia) Ognjen Kuzmić	8	5	2
Reserves:					
PG	0	(United States) Nate Wolters	14	3	5
F/C	2	(United States) Deon Thompson	0	0	1
G/F	13	(Serbia) Ognjen Dobrić	0	1	0
F	19	(Serbia) Marko Simonović	5	2	1
G/F	20	(Serbia) Petar Rakićević	DNP		
G/F	23	(Serbia) Marko Gudurić	10	4	3
F/C	51	(Montenegro) Milko Bjelica	3	1	0
Head coach:
(Basketball Federation of Montenegro) Dejan Radonjić

Crvena zvezda	Cedevita

Starters:			Pts	Reb	Ast
PG	3	(United States) Ryan Boatright	10	3	2
PG	0	(United States) Ra'Shad James	11	2	1
SG	9	(Croatia) Luka Babić	7	5	2
PF	11	(Croatia) Karlo Žganec	4	7	1
C	15	(Croatia) Miro Bilan	12	2	0
Reserves:					
F	1	(Croatia) Bajo, Darko	DNP		
SG	2	(Croatia) Filip Krušlin	2	0	1
PG	6	(Croatia) Toni Katić	2	0	2
SF	13	(Bosnia and Herzegovina) Džanan Musa	DNP		
F	22	(United States) John Shurna	10	4	1
C	25	(Slovenia) Mirza Begić	6	1	0
F	33	(Croatia) Marko Tomas	9	3	2
Head coach:
(Italian Basketball Federation) Gianmarco Pozzecco

=== Game 3 ===
13 April 2017	Cedevita (Croatia)	61–77 (Series: 0–3)	(Serbia) Crvena zvezda mts	Zagreb
19:00 (CEST)	Scoring by quarter: 18–22, 21–24, 9–19, 13–12
	Pts: Katić 12; Rebs: Shurna 6 Asts: Krušlin 3 PIR: James, Shurna 13	Report	Pts: Thompson 14; Rebs: Mitrović 6 Asts: Jenkins 8 PIR: Thompson 24	Arena: Dom Sportova 2 Attendance: 3,000; Referees: (Croatia) Sreten Radović (Serbia) Milivoje Jovčić (Montenegro) Igor Dragojević

Starters:			Pts	Reb	Ast
PG	0	(United States) Ra'Shad James	9	3	2
SG	9	(Croatia) Luka Babić	7	0	1
F	33	(Croatia) Marko Tomas	8	2	0
PF	11	(Croatia) Karlo Žganec	2	3	1
C	15	(Croatia) Miro Bilan	4	5	2
Reserves:					
SG	2	(Croatia) Filip Krušlin	5	3	3
PG	6	(Croatia) Toni Katić	12	2	2
SF	13	(Bosnia and Herzegovina) Džanan Musa	6	2	2
F	22	(United States) John Shurna	6	6	2
C	25	(Slovenia) Mirza Begić	2	3	0
Head coach:
(Croatian Basketball Federation) Veljko Mršić

Cedevita	Crvena zvezda

Starters:			Pts	Reb	Ast
G	22	(United States) Charles Jenkins	8	2	8
G/F	10	(Serbia) Branko Lazić	8	2	2
G/F	6	(Serbia) Nemanja Dangubić	6	2	0
PF	9	(Serbia) Luka Mitrović	5	6	0
C	32	(Serbia) Ognjen Kuzmić	6	5	0
Reserves:					
PG	0	(United States) Nate Wolters	11	5	3
F/C	2	(United States) Deon Thompson	14	4	2
G/F	13	(Serbia) Ognjen Dobrić	0	1	0
F	19	(Serbia) Marko Simonović	13	5	1
G/F	20	(Serbia) Petar Rakićević	0	0	0
G/F	23	(Serbia) Marko Gudurić	4	2	0
F/C	51	(Montenegro) Milko Bjelica	2	1	0
Head coach:
(Basketball Federation of Montenegro) Dejan Radonjić
