= 2016–17 Radivoj Korać Cup =

15th season of Serbian national basketball cup tournament

Piraeus Bank Radivoj Korać Cup 2017^{1}
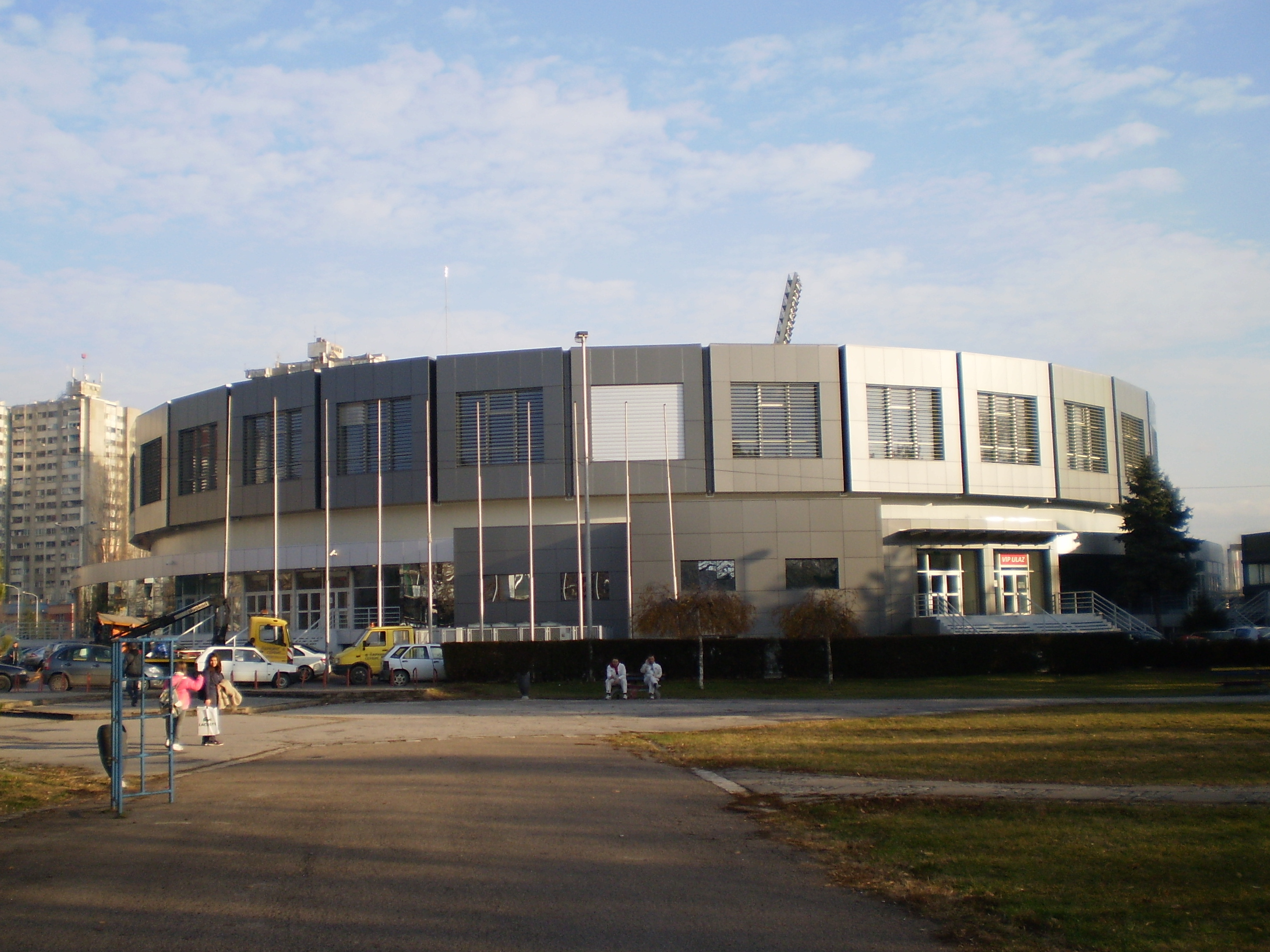
- Čair Sports Center in Niš
- Season: 2016–17
- Duration: 16–19 February 2017
- Teams: 8
- TV partner: Arena Sport

Regular season
- Season MVP: (Serbia) Marko Gudurić

Finals
- Champions: Crvena zvezda mts
- Runners-up: Partizan NIS

Awards
- Top Scorer: (Serbia) Marko Simonović
- ^{1} Sponsored cup name, referring to Piraeus Bank.

The 2017 Piraeus Bank Radivoj Korać Cup season was the 15th season of the Serbian national basketball cup tournament.

== Teams ==
Seeded	Unseeded
Crvena zvezda mts (ABA)	Dynamic (CS2)^{1}
FMP (ABA)	Vršac (BLS)^{2}
Mega Leks (ABA)	Spartak (BLS)^{2}
Partizan NIS (ABA)	Dunav (BLS)^{2}

- ^{1}CS2–Cup of Serbia (2nd-tier) winner
- ^{2}League table after 13 rounds played: 1st–Dynamic (11–2)^{1}, 2nd–Vršac (11–2), 3rd–Spartak (9–4), 4th–Dunav (8–5)

== Bracket ==
Quarterfinals
February 16, 2017
Crvena zvezda mts	99
Vršac	47
February 16, 2017
FMP	77
Spartak	58
February 17, 2017
Mega Leks	84
Dynamic	57
February 17, 2017
Partizan NIS	80
Dunav	60

Semifinals
February 18, 2017
Crvena zvezda mts	76
FMP	60
February 18, 2017
Mega Leks	65
Partizan NIS	77

Final
February 19, 2017
Crvena zvezda mts	74
Partizan NIS	64

=== Quarterfinals ===
16 February 2017	FMP	77–58	Spartak	Niš
17:00	Scoring by quarter: 15–12, 24–18, 27–15, 11–13
	Pts: Ljubičić 18; Rebs: three players 6 Asts: Radanov 4 PIR: Ljubičić 19	Boxscore	Pts: Miščević 18; Rebs: Tresač 7 Asts: Ljubenković 6 PIR: Miščević 23	Arena: Čair Sports Center; Attendance: 2,000; Referees: Nikolić, Ninković, Prpa

16 February 2017	Crvena zvezda mts	99–47	Vršac	Niš
19:30	Scoring by quarter: 30–7, 27–10, 24–15, 18–15
	Pts: Simonović 19; Rebs: Mitrović 10; Asts: Mitrović 7 PIR: Mitrović 27	Boxscore	Pts: Savović 11; Rebs: Jeftić 9 Asts: Jeftić 3 PIR: Jeftić 3	Arena: Čair Sports Center; Attendance: 4,000; Referees: Glišić, Jevtović, Arsenijević

17 February 2017	Mega Leks	84–57	Dynamic	Niš
17:00	Scoring by quarter: 26–17, 21–12, 26–10, 11–18
	Pts: Jaramaz 18; Rebs: Tejić 7 Asts: Jaramaz 7 PIR: Jaramaz 27	Boxscore	Pts: Stevanović 21; Rebs: Ffriend 6 Asts: Katnić, Nađfeji 3 PIR: Stevanović 12	Arena: Čair Sports Center; Attendance: 1,800; Referees: Maričić, Stefanović, Pecelj

17 February 2017	Partizan NIS	80–60	Dunav	Niš
19:30	Scoring by quarter: 18–18, 23–5, 23–20, 16–17
	Pts: Andrić 17; Rebs: Tanasković 11; Asts: Ratkovica, Pot 5 PIR: Luković 19	Boxscore	Pts: Zorčić 19; Rebs: three players 8 Asts: Nenadić, Sočanac 3 PIR: Zorčić 22	Arena: Čair Sports Center; Attendance: 4,000; Referees: Mrdak, Čukalović, Vesković

=== Semifinals ===
18 February 2017	Crvena zvezda mts	76–60	FMP	Niš
17:00	Scoring by quarter: 27–14, 21–18, 19–13, 9–15
	Pts: Gudurić 21; Rebs: Kuzmić 5 Asts: Jović 6 PIR: Gudurić 19	Boxscore	Pts: Ljubičić 18; Rebs: Bolden 9 Asts: Čović, Bolden 3 PIR: Austin 21	Arena: Čair Sports Center; Attendance: 4,000; Referees: Jovčić, vojinović, Obrknežević

18 February 2017	Mega Leks	65–77	Partizan NIS	Niš
21:00	Scoring by quarter: 14–20, 22–19, 13–23, 16–15
	Pts: Jaramaz 23; Rebs: Kaba 12; Asts: three players 2 PIR: Jaramaz 20	Boxscore	Pts: Veličković 19; Rebs: Luković 13; Asts: Ratkovica 8 PIR: Veličković 20	Arena: Čair Sports Center; Attendance: 4,500; Referees: Belošević, Juras, Nešković

=== Final ===
19 February 2017	Crvena zvezda mts	74–64	Partizan NIS	Niš
21:00	Scoring by quarter: 23–23, 13–11, 16–13, 22–17
	Pts: Simonović, Gudurić 18; Rebs: Thompson 6 Asts: Jović 7 PIR: Gudurić 22	Boxscore	Pts: Vrabac 12; Rebs: Veličković 7 Asts: Pot 4 PIR: Vrabac 15	Arena: Čair Sports Center; Attendance: 4,500; Referees: Belošević, Jovčić, Vojinović

Starters:			Pts	Reb	Ast
PG	24	(Serbia) Stefan Jović	5	2	7
G/F	10	(Serbia) Branko Lazić	1	0	0
G/F	23	(Serbia) Marko Gudurić	18	4	6
PF	9	(Serbia) Luka Mitrović	12	3	1
C	32	(Serbia) Ognjen Kuzmić	2	2	0
Reserves:					
PG	0	(United States) Nate Wolters	DNP		
F/C	2	(United States) Deon Thompson	15	6	0
G/F	13	(Serbia) Ognjen Dobrić	1	1	0
F	19	(Serbia) Marko Simonović	18	1	0
G/F	20	(Serbia) Petar Rakićević	DNP		
G	22	(United States) Charles Jenkins	0	2	2
F/C	51	(Montenegro) Milko Bjelica	2	3	1
Head coach:
(Basketball Federation of Montenegro) Dejan Radonjić

Crvena zvezda	Partizan

2017 Radivoj Korać Cup Champions
Crvena zvezda mts
9th title

Starters:			Pts	Reb	Ast
SG	33	(Serbia) Stefan Pot	6	2	4
SG	44	(United States) Jamont Gordon	8	3	2
SF	7	(Bosnia and Herzegovina) Adin Vrabac	12	5	1
PF	14	(Serbia) Stefan Birčević	11	1	0
C	55	(Serbia) Uroš Luković	6	6	1
Reserves:					
PG	6	(Serbia) Branislav Ratkovica	2	2	3
F	10	(Serbia) Nikola Tanasković	DNP		
PF	12	(Serbia) Novica Veličković	9	7	1
C	13	(Serbia) Đorđe Majstorović	2	1	1
SF	21	(Serbia) Mihajlo Andrić	8	1	0
Head coach:
(Basketball Federation of Serbia) Nenad Čanak

== See also ==
- 2016–17 Basketball League of Serbia
