= Slobodan Jovanović (disambiguation) =

Slobodan Jovanović, Slobodan Jovanović or Slobodan Jovanovic (Serbian Cyrillic: Слободан Јовановић) may refer to:

- Slobodan Jovanović (1869–1958), Serbian historian, lawyer, philosopher, literary critic and politician
- Slobodan Jovanović (basketball) (born 1997), Serbian basketball player
- Slobodan Jovanović (rower), Croatian rower
