= Kemal Karahodžić =

Hungarian basketball player

No. 11 – Kecskeméti TE
- Position: Center
- League: Nemzeti Bajnokság I/A

Personal information
- Born: July 26, 1989 (age 37) Bačka Topola, SFR Yugoslavia
- Listed height: 2.10 m (6 ft 11 in)
- Listed weight: 107 kg (236 lb)

Career information
- NBA draft: 2011: undrafted
- Playing career: 2007–present

Career history
- 2007–2012: KK Spartak Subotica
- 2012–present: Kecskemét

Kemal Karahodžić (Serbian Cyrillic: Кемал Карахоџић; born July 26, 1989) is a Hungarian professional basketball player for Kecskemét of the Nemzeti Bajnokság I/A. He also represents the Hungarian national team internationally.

== International career ==
Karahodžić was a member of the Hungarian national team that participated at the EuroBasket 2017. Over six tournament games, he averaged 2.2 points, 2.7 rebounds and 0.6 assists per game.

== Personal life ==
He was born in Bačka Topola, SAP Vojvodina, SFR Yugoslavia to a Bosniak family. His younger brother, Kenan, is also a professional basketball player and represents the Bosnia and Herzegovina national team internationally.
