= Ra'Shad James =

American basketball player (born 1990)

Personal information
- Born: January 26, 1990 (age 36) White Plains, New York, U.S.
- Listed height: 6 ft 1 in (1.85 m)
- Listed weight: 195 lb (88 kg)

Career information
- High school: White Plains (White Plains, New York)
- College: St. Thomas Aquinas (2008–2010); Iona (2011–2012); Northwood (2012–2013)
- NBA draft: 2013: undrafted
- Playing career: 2013–present
- Position: Point guard / shooting guard

Career history
- 2013–2015: Reno Bighorns
- 2015: Wonju Dongbu Promy
- 2015–2016: Koszalin
- 2016: Westchester Knicks
- 2016–2017: Cedevita
- 2017–2018: Yeşilgiresun Belediye
- 2018–2019: Telekom Baskets Bonn
- 2019: Ulm
- 2019: Boulazac
- 2019–2020: Ormanspor
- 2020–2021: Orasì Ravenna
- 2021: AS Salé
- 2021–2022: Birmingham Squadron
- 2022: Cañeros del Este
- 2022: Scarborough Shooting Stars
- 2022–2023: Al Wahda Abu Dhabi
- 2023: Broncos de Caracas
- 2023–2024: Al-Muharraq
- 2024: Broncos de Caracas
- 2024: Zob Ahan Isfahan
- 2025: Santos del Potosí
- 2026: Toros Laguna

Career highlights
- Croatian League champion (2017); Croatian Cup winner (2017); NABC NAIA Division II Player of the Year (2013)

Ra'Shad James (born January 26, 1990) is an American professional basketball player for the Zob Ahan Isfahan of the Iranian Basketball Super League. He played college basketball for St. Thomas Aquinas, Iona and Northwood Seahawks.

== Early career ==
After playing high school basketball at White Plains High School, in White Plains, New York, James played two seasons at St. Thomas Aquinas before transferring to Iona for his junior season. He finished his college career at Northwood (Florida) University.

== Professional career ==
=== Reno Bighorns (2013–2015) ===
James went undrafted in the 2013 NBA draft. He played his first two professional seasons with Reno Bighorns of the NBA Development League.

=== Wonju Dongbu Promy (2015) ===
The 2015–16 season James started with Wonju Dongbu Promy of South Korea, but left the club after appearing in 15 games.

=== Koszalin (2015–2016) ===
On November 6, 2015, he signed with AZS Koszalin of Poland. On February 11, 2016, he parted ways with Koszalin.

=== Westchester Knicks (2016) ===
On February 23, 2016, he was acquired by the Westchester Knicks.

In July 2016, James joined the Milwaukee Bucks for the 2016 NBA Summer League.

=== Cedevita Zagreb (2016–2017) ===
On August 29, 2016, he signed with Cedevita Zagreb of Croatia for the 2016–17 season.

=== Yeşilgiresun Belediye (2017–2018) ===
On August 23, 2017, James signed with Turkish club Yeşilgiresun Belediye.

=== Telekom Baskets Bonn (2018–2019) ===
In July 2018 he joined the German side Telekom Baskets Bonn on a one-year contract. In 15 Bundesliga games, he led Bonn in scoring with 14.9 points per contest, but parted ways with the club in January 2019.

=== Ulm (2019) ===
A couple of days later, he signed with fellow Bundesliga side Ratiopharm Ulm. He appeared in only five Bundesliga games for Ulm (9.2 points, 2.2 assists per contest) due to shoulder injury.

=== Boulazac (2019) ===
In July 2019, he was signed by Boulazac Basket Dordogne of the French top-flight LNB Pro A. On August 14, 2019, Boulazac announced that Ra’Shad James will not play for the team next season because he failed physicals and his contract was voided.

=== Ormanspor (2019–2020) ===
On November 18, 2019, he has signed with Ormanspor for the Turkish Basketbol Süper Ligi.

=== Orasì Ravenna (2020–2021) ===
On July 24, 2020, he has signed with Orasì Ravenna for the Italian Serie A2 Basket.

=== AS Salé (2021) ===
In May 2021, James played with AS Salé in the inaugural season of the Basketball Africa League (BAL). He averaged 16.8 points while his team finished as quarterfinalist.

=== Birmingham Squadron (2021–2022) ===
On October 25, 2021, James joined the Birmingham Squadron after being acquired from the available player pool.

== BAL career statistics ==
Legend
GP	Games played	GS	Games started	MPG	Minutes per game
FG%	Field goal percentage	3P%	3-point field goal percentage	FT%	Free throw percentage
RPG	Rebounds per game	APG	Assists per game	SPG	Steals per game
BPG	Blocks per game	PPG	Points per game	**Bold**	Career high

Year	Team	GP	GS	MPG	FG%	3P%	FT%	RPG	APG	SPG	BPG	PPG
2021	AS Salé	4	4	34.2	.482	.263	.889	6.3	1.8	1.3	.0	16.8
Career		4	4	34.2	.482	.263	.889	6.3	1.8	1.3	.0	16.8
