= Kenan Karahodžić =

Serbian basketball player

Dubrava
- Position: Power forward
- League: Croatian League

Personal information
- Born: 29 January 1996 (age 30) Bačka Topola, FR Yugoslavia
- Listed height: 2.09 m (6 ft 10 in)
- Listed weight: 104 kg (229 lb)

Career information
- NBA draft: 2018: undrafted
- Playing career: 2011–present

Career history
- 2009–2011: Spartak Subotica
- 2011–2018: Unicaja
- 2013–2014: → Axarquía
- 2016–2017: → Partizan
- 2017–2018: → Oviedo
- 2018–2019: Huesca
- 2019–2020: Estela
- 2020–2021: Marbella
- 2021–present: Dubrava

Kenan Karahodžić (Serbian Cyrillic: Кенан Карахоџић; born 29 January 1996) is a Serbian professional basketball player for Dubrava of the Croatian League. He represented the Bosnia and Herzegovina national team in 2014.

== Personal life ==
He was born in Bačka Topola, FR Yugoslavia. His older brother, Kemal, is also a professional basketball player and represents the Hungarian national team internationally.

He has signed the Declaration on the Common Language, affirming that Croats, Bosniaks, Montenegrins and Serbs speak a common standard and polycentric language.
