= Will Hatcher =

American basketball player

retired
- Position: Point guard / shooting guard

Personal information
- Born: August 8, 1984 (age 42) Flint, Michigan, U.S.
- Listed height: 6 ft 2 in (1.88 m)
- Listed weight: 188 lb (85 kg)

Career information
- High school: Carman-Ainsworth (Flint, Michigan)
- College: Miami (Ohio) (2002–2006)
- NBA draft: 2006: undrafted
- Playing career: 2006–2021

Career history
- 2006–2007: Dragons Rhöndorf
- 2007–2008: CSU Atlassib Sibiu
- 2008–2011: BK Děčín
- 2011–2012: Keravnos
- 2012: Hapoel Gilboa Galil
- 2012–2013: PAOK Thessaloniki
- 2013–2014: STB Le Havre
- 2014–2015: Spirou Charleroi
- 2015–2016: PAOK Thessaloniki
- 2016–2017: Partizan
- 2017–2018: Dinamo Sassari
- 2018–2019: PAOK Thessaloniki
- 2019–2020: Peristeri
- 2020–2021: Iraklis Thessaloniki

Career highlights
- BCL Star Lineup Second Best Team (2017); Greek Cup Finals Top Scorer (2019); Romanian League All-Star (2008); Cypriot Cup winner (2012); First-team All-MAC (2006)

William Da Corean Hatcher (born August 8, 1984) is an American former professional basketball player. He last played for Iraklis of the Greek Basket League. He played as a 6 ft 2 in (1.88 m) tall point guard–shooting guard.

== High school career ==
Hatcher played high school basketball at Carman-Ainsworth High School in Flint, Michigan. In his senior year of high school, he was an All-State Honorable Mention selection. He was also twice an All-First Team Conference selection and team captain.

== College career ==
After high school, Hatcher played college basketball at Miami University with the Miami RedHawks, from 2002 to 2006. In his senior season (2005–06) at Miami, Ohio, Hatcher was selected to the All-MAC Conference First team. He was also named the MAC's Eastern Division player of the week twice, and was also voted as the MAC's "Best All-Around Guard".

== Professional career ==
Hatcher's professional career began in 2006. He signed his first contract to play in Germany, with the German club Dragons Rhöndorf of the German 2nd Division. After that, Hatcher played in Romania, Czech Republic, Cyprus, Israel, Greece, France, Belgium, and Serbia.

On October 8, 2015, he signed a contract with his former team PAOK. On August 1, 2016, he signed a one-year contract with the Serbian team Partizan.

On June 11, 2017, Hatcher signed with Italian club Dinamo Sassari.

On August 6, 2018, Hatcher returned to the Greek team PAOK Thessaloniki for a third stint. The following season, he moved to Peristeri.

On November 27, 2020 he joined Iraklis of the Greek Basket League.

== Personal life ==
Hatcher's cousin, Charlie Bell, also played college basketball at Michigan State, with the Michigan State Spartans, and he also played in the NBA with the Phoenix Suns, Dallas Mavericks, Milwaukee Bucks, and the Golden State Warriors.
