= Miloš Koprivica =

Serbian basketball player (born 1995)

No. 9 – Metalac Valjevo
- Position: Center
- League: Serbian League

Personal information
- Born: March 24, 1995 (age 31) Sokolac, Bosnia and Herzegovina
- Listed height: 2.08 m (6 ft 10 in)
- Listed weight: 102 kg (225 lb)

Career information
- Playing career: 2014–present

Career history
- 2014–2015: Sloboda Užice
- 2015–2017: Partizan
- 2017–2019: Mega
- 2019: Lovćen 1947
- 2020–2021: Podgorica
- 2021–2023: Sutjeska
- 2023–2024: Kaposvári KK
- 2024–2025: MZT Skopje
- 2025–present: Metalac Valjevo

Career highlights
- Macedonian League winner (2025); Macedonian Cup winner (2025)

Miloš Koprivica (Serbian Cyrillic: Милош Копривица, born 24 March 1995) is a Serbian professional basketball player for Metalac Valjevo of the Serbian League (KLS).
