= Deon Thompson =

American basketball player

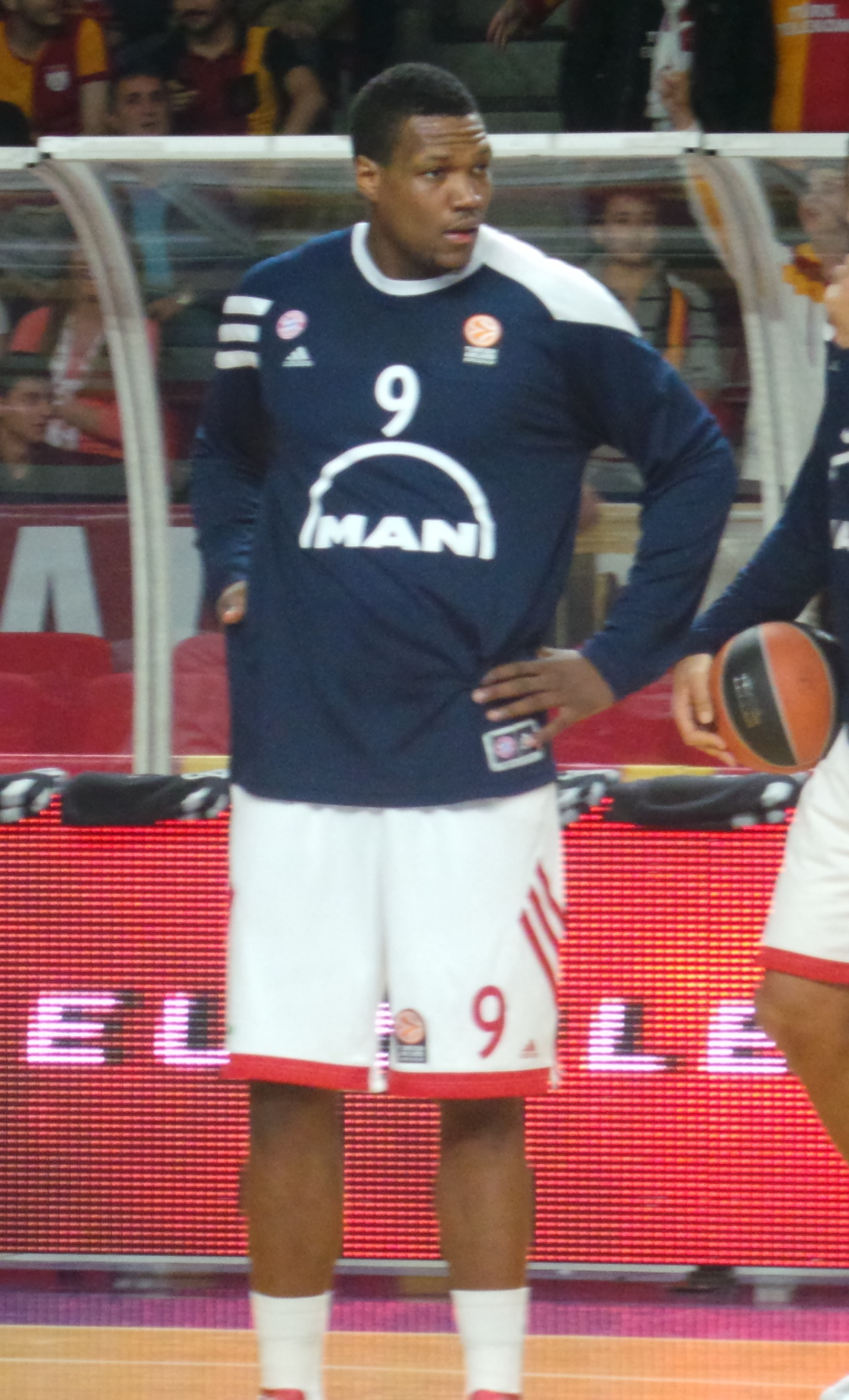
- Thompson with Bayern Munich in 2013

Personal information
- Born: September 16, 1988 (age 38) Torrance, California, U.S.
- Listed height: 6 ft 8 in (2.03 m)
- Listed weight: 245 lb (111 kg)

Career information
- High school: Torrance (Torrance, California)
- College: North Carolina (2006–2010)
- NBA draft: 2010: undrafted
- Playing career: 2010–2026
- Position: Power forward

Career history
- 2010–2011: Ikaros Kallitheas
- 2011–2012: Union Olimpija
- 2012–2013: Alba Berlin
- 2013–2014: Bayern Munich
- 2014–2015: Liaoning Flying Leopards
- 2015: Hapoel Jerusalem
- 2015–2016: Bayern Munich
- 2016: Galatasaray
- 2017: Crvena zvezda
- 2017–2019: San Pablo Burgos
- 2019: Žalgiris
- 2019–2021: Unicaja
- 2021: Leones de Ponce
- 2021–2022: Casademont Zaragoza
- 2022: Libertadores de Querétaro
- 2022–2023: Tofaş
- 2023: Jeonju KCC Egis
- 2023–2024: Shinshu Brave Warriors
- 2024: Indios de Mayagüez
- 2024: Busan KCC Egis
- 2024–2025: Rain or Shine Elasto Painters
- 2025: Al Ahli Tripoli
- 2025–2026: Kesatria Bengawan Solo

Career highlights
- Lithuanian League champion (2019); Adriatic League champion (2017); Serbian League champion (2017); Serbian Cup winner (2017); Israeli League champion (2015); German League champion (2014); German Cup winner (2013); 2× German All-Star (2013, 2016); All-German League First Team (2013); All-German League Second Team (2014); Slovenian Cup winner (2012); Slovenian Cup MVP (2012); Slovenian League All-Star (2012); Slovenian League All-Star Game MVP (2012); Greek League All-Star (2011); NCAA champion (2009)
Medals
Men's basketball
Representing United States
Summer Universiade
| Bronze medal – third place | 2009 Belgrade |
FIBA U19 World Cup
| Silver medal – second place | 2007 Serbia |

Deon Marshall Thompson (born September 16, 1988) is a former American-Ivorian professional basketball player. He played college basketball for the North Carolina Tar Heels. Standing at 2.04 m (6 ft 8 1/2 in), he played the power forward position.

== High school and college career ==
As a senior at Torrance High School in Torrance, California, Thompson scored 30 or more points five times and had 20 or more rebounds on six occasions, and led his team to the Division II-A finals in 2006 and quarterfinals in 2005. He averaged 21.5 points, 13.8 rebounds and 4.6 blocked shots as a senior.

Thompson wore No. 21 for North Carolina. He was a starter on the 2008–09 Tar Heels team that won that year's national championship and is considered one of the greatest in college basketball history; that season, Thompson averaged 10.6 points and 5.7 rebounds per game.

When his college career ended in 2010, he had played in a total of 152 games, at that time the most in NCAA Division I men's history, with 113 starts. While the record was broken the following season by David Lighty of Ohio State, and is now held by Iowa's Jordan Bohannon, Thompson is now tied with Kentucky's Darius Miller for the most games among players who participated in the standard four seasons. (Note: Lighty played in five seasons, and the current 2021–22 season is Bohannon's sixth. Both received hardship waivers, popularly known as "medical redshirts", that gave them a fifth season of eligibility. Bohannon also benefited from the NCAA's decision to not count the 2020–21 season, heavily affected by COVID-19, against any basketball player's period of eligibility.)

== Professional career ==
After going undrafted in the 2010 NBA draft, Thompson joined the Minnesota Timberwolves for the 2010 NBA Summer League. On August 1, 2010, he signed with Greek club Ikaros Kallitheas for the 2010–11 season.

On July 20, 2011, Thompson signed a two-year deal with Slovenian club Union Olimpija. With Olimpija he won the 2012 Slovenian Cup. On August 7, 2012, he parted ways with Olimpija.

On August 12, 2012, Thompson signed with German club Alba Berlin for the 2012–13 season. With Alba he won the 2013 German Cup. At the end of the season he was named to the All-BBL First Team.

On August 2, 2013, Thompson signed with Bayern Munich. With Bayern he won the 2013–14 Bundesliga, and was also named to the All-BBL Second Team. On August 14, 2014, he parted ways with Bayern.

On August 26, 2014, Thompson signed with the Liaoning Flying Leopards of China for the 2014–15 CBA season. On March 23, 2015, he signed with Hapoel Jerusalem of the Israeli Premier League for the rest of the season.

On July 20, 2015, Thompson returned to Bayern Munich, signing a one-year deal.

On July 12, 2016, Thompson signed with Galatasaray for the 2016–17 season. On January 2, 2017, he left Galatasaray and signed with Serbian club Crvena zvezda for the rest of the season.

On August 19, 2017, Thompson signed with Spanish club San Pablo Burgos and became the top rebounder of the 2017–18 ACB season with 6.7 rebounds per game. He was also named MVP of the week after performing and average index of 31 in the club wins at MoraBanc Andorra and versus Real Betis Energía Plus. On August 6, 2018, Thompson re-signed with San Pablo Burgos for an additional season.

On January 6, 2019, Thompson left Burgos and signed with Lithuanian club Žalgiris Kaunas until the end of the season. He helped Žalgiris reach the EuroLeague playoffs, and win the Lithuanian Basketball League championship.

On June 17, 2019, Thompson signed a two-year contract with Unicaja of the Liga ACB.

On October 28, 2021, Thompson signed with Casademont Zaragoza of the Liga ACB.

On October 14, 2022, Thompson signed with Tofaş of Basketbol Süper Ligi (BSL). On February 20, 2023, he parted ways with the club.

On August 18, 2023, Thompson signed with Shinshu Brave Warriors of the B.League, where he averaged 11.4 points and 8.3 rebounds in 29 minutes.

On March 26, 2024, Thompson signed with the Indios de Mayagüez of the Baloncesto Superior Nacional.

On November 27, 2024, Thompson signed with the Rain or Shine Elasto Painters of the Philippine Basketball Association (PBA) as the team's import for the 2024–25 PBA Commissioner's Cup.

On May 17, 2025, Thompson made his debut for Libyan champions Al Ahli Tripoli in the 2025 BAL season. He left the team between the group stage and the start of the playoffs.

== National team career ==
In July 2019, Thompson was listed as a preliminary squad member of the Ivory Coast national team for the 2019 FIBA Basketball World Cup. In 2024, he participated in the Olympic Qualifying Tournament with the Ivorian team.

== Retirement and coaching career ==
On May 12, 2026, Thompson announced his retirement from professional basketball after "16 years, 22 teams, and 14 countries." UNC coach Michael Malone announced that Thompson would be returning to Chapel Hill as a graduate assistant coach while he pursues a master's degree at UNC's Kenan-Flagler Business School.

== Career statistics ==
Legend
| GP | Games played | GS | Games started | MPG | Minutes per game |
| FG% | Field-goal percentage | 3P% | 3-point field-goal percentage | FT% | Free-throw percentage |
| RPG | Rebounds per game | APG | Assists per game | SPG | Steals per game |
| BPG | Blocks per game | PPG | Points per game | PIR | Performance index rating |
| **Bold** | Career high |

=== EuroLeague ===
| Year | Team | GP | GS | MPG | FG% | 3P% | FT% | RPG | APG | SPG | BPG | PPG | PIR |
|---|---|---|---|---|---|---|---|---|---|---|---|---|---|
| 2011–12 | Union Olimpija | 10 | 5 | 23.6 | .443 | .000 | .476 | 4.1 | .8 | .3 | .2 | 8.8 | 6.0 |
| 2012–13 | Alba Berlin | **23** | **22** | **26.6** | .524 | **.250** | **.792** | **5.4** | .8 | .7 | .7 | **12.0** | **13.6** |
| 2013–14 | Bayern | 21 | 11 | 18.8 | .454 | .200 | .568 | 4.7 | .5 | .3 | .4 | 7.3 | 7.0 |
| 2015–16 | Bayern | 10 | 8 | 23.1 | .482 | .000 | .769 | 4.1 | **1.0** | **1.2** | **1.1** | 9.2 | 8.7 |
| 2016–17 | Galatasaray | 13 | 0 | 11.6 | .500 | .000 | .636 | 2.1 | .7 | .5 | .4 | 4.2 | 4.4 |
| 2016–17 | Crvena zvezda | 13 | 0 | 10.5 | .561 | .000 | .500 | 1.5 | .5 | .3 | .3 | 4.3 | 4.4 |
| 2018–19 | Žalgiris | 17 | 0 | 13.8 | **.596** | .000 | .571 | 3.1 | .5 | .5 | .4 | 4.7 | 5.8 |
| Career | | 107 | 46 | 18.7 | .499 | .111 | .649 | 3.8 | .7 | .5 | .5 | 7.5 | 7.6 |

== See also ==
- List of NCAA Division I men's basketball career games played leaders
