= Frank Robinson (basketball) =

American basketball player

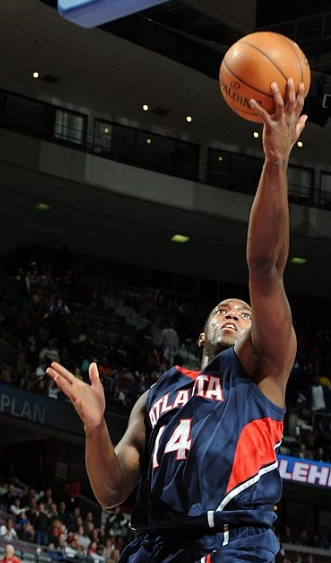

Personal information
- Born: June 1, 1984 (age 42) Compton, California
- Listed height: 6 ft 4 in (1.93 m)
- Listed weight: 220 lb (100 kg)

Career information
- High school: Sylmar (Sylmar, Los Angeles)
- College: East Carolina (2003–2004); Cal State Fullerton (2005–2008)
- NBA draft: 2008: undrafted
- Playing career: 2008–2018
- Position: Shooting guard / small forward

Career history
- 2008–2009: Union Olimpija
- 2009: Ludwigsburg
- 2009–2010: Los Angeles D-Fenders
- 2010–2011: Maccabi Haifa
- 2011: Sokhumi
- 2011–2012: Habik'a
- 2012: Asseco Prokom Gdynia
- 2012–2013: Budivelnyk
- 2013: S.Oliver Baskets
- 2013–2014: Bisons Loimaa
- 2014: Panelefsiniakos
- 2015: Ironi Nahariya
- 2016: İstanbul DSİ
- 2016–2017: Partizan
- 2017–2018: Club Malvín
- 2018: Changwon LG Sakers

Career highlights
- Slovenian Cup winner (2009)

Franklin Marquieth Robinson (born June 1, 1984) is an American professional basketball retired player. He played college basketball for the East Carolina University and the California State University, Fullerton.

== Professional career ==
Robinson started his professional career in 2008 with Union Olimpija of Slovenia. On February 27, 2009, he parted ways with Olimpija. In March 2009, he signed with Ludwigsburg for the rest of the season.

On December 23, 2009, Robinson was acquired by the Los Angeles D-Fenders of the NBA D-League.

On July 24, 2010, Robinson signed with Maccabi Haifa of Israel for the 2010–11 season.

The 2011–12 season Robinson started with Sokhumi, but left the team after few weeks due to the financial problems the club was facing. He then signed with Artland Dragons but left the team before appearing in a game for them. In December 2011, he moved to Israel and signed with Habik'a for the rest of the 2011–12 season.

On September 7, 2012, Robinson signed with Asseco Prokom Gdynia of Poland. On November 28, 2012, he parted ways with Prokom. On December 5, 2012, he signed with Budivelnyk of Ukraine. On January 30, 2013, he was waived by Budivelnyk. On February 23, 2013, he signed with S.Oliver Baskets of Germany for the rest of the season.

On October 3, 2013, Robinson signed with Bisons Loimaa of Finland for the 2013–14 season.

On September 17, 2014, Robinson signed with Panelefsiniakos of Greece. On December 31, 2014, he left Panelefsiniakos and signed with Israeli club Ironi Nahariya for the rest of the season.

On February 12, 2016, Robinson signed with İstanbul DSİ of the Turkish Basketball First League. In six games, he averaged 15.7 points, 4.5 rebounds and 3.2 assists per game.

On July 29, 2016, Robinson signed with Serbian club Partizan for the 2016–17 season. On May 7, 2017, he parted ways with Partizan.

On September 8, 2017, Robinson signed with Club Malvín for the 2017–18 season. He left Malvin after appearing in 17 games. On January 30, 2018, he signed with Changwon LG Sakers of South Korea for the rest of the season.

Robinson announced the end of his career in October 2018.

== The Basketball Tournament ==
Frank Robinson played for Team CitiTeam Blazers in the 2018 edition of The Basketball Tournament. In two games, he averaged 5.5 points per game and 4.0 rebounds per game. CitiTeam Blazers made it to the Second Round before falling to Team Challenge ALS.

== Career statistics ==
Legend
GP	Games played	GS	Games started	MPG	Minutes per game
FG%	Field-goal percentage	3P%	3-point field-goal percentage	FT%	Free-throw percentage
RPG	Rebounds per game	APG	Assists per game	SPG	Steals per game
BPG	Blocks per game	PPG	Points per game	PIR	Performance index rating
**Bold**	Career high

=== Euroleague ===
Year	Team	GP	GS	MPG	FG%	3P%	FT%	RPG	APG	SPG	BPG	PPG	PIR
2008–09	Union Olimpija	**8**	**5**	20.2	**.588**	.143	**.579**	3.3	.6	.5	.0	6.8	4.4
2012–13	Asseco Prokom Gdynia	7	4	20.2	.407	**.269**	.50	**3.7**	.6	**.6**	.0	**7.4**	**5.9**
Career		15	9	20.2	.382	.242	.541	3.5	.6	.5	.0	7.1	5.1
