= Slobodan Jovanović (basketball) =

Serbian basketball player

No. 8 – Vršac
- Position: Shooting guard
- League: Basketball League of Serbia

Personal information
- Born: 19 February 1997 (age 29) Belgrade, FR Yugoslavia
- Listed height: 1.93 m (6 ft 4 in)

Career information
- NBA draft: 2019: undrafted
- Playing career: 2015–present

Career history
- 2015–2018: Partizan
- 2017–2018: → OKK Beograd
- 2018–2019: Spars Sarajevo
- 2020: Dynamic Belgrade
- 2020–2021: Metalac
- 2021–present: Vršac
Medals
Men's basketball
Representing Serbia
U17 World Championship
Bronze medal – third place	2014 UAE	Team
U16 European Championship
Silver medal – second place	2013 Ukraine	Team
U16 European Championship
Bronze medal – third place	2012 Lithuania & Latvia	Team

Slobodan Jovanović (Serbian Cyrillic: Слободан Јовановић, born 19 February 1997) is a Serbian professional basketball player for Vršac of the Basketball League of Serbia. Standing at 1.93 m (6 ft 4 in), he plays at the shooting guard position.

== Professional career ==
In December 2015, 18-year-old Jovanović signed his first professional contract with Partizan Belgrade. Prior to 2017–18 season, he was loaned to the OKK Beograd.

== International career ==
Jovanović represented the Serbia men's national under-16 basketball team at the 2013 FIBA Europe Under-16 Championship where they won the silver medal. The following year he was part of the U17 national team that won the bronze medal at the 2014 FIBA Under-17 World Championship.
