= Novica Veličković =

Serbian basketball player (born 1986)

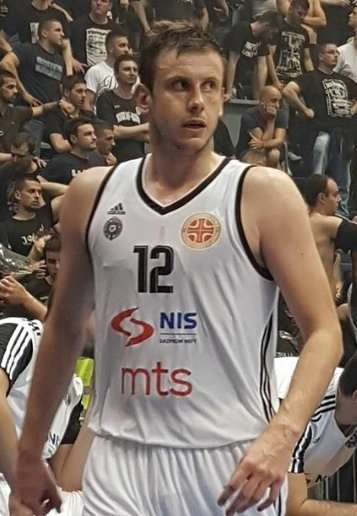
- Veličković with Partizan in 2016

Partizan Mozzart Bet
- Title: Player development coach

Personal information
- Born: 5 October 1986 (age 40) Belgrade, SFR Yugoslavia
- Listed height: 2.05 m (6 ft 9 in)
- Listed weight: 105 kg (231 lb)

Career information
- NBA draft: 2008: undrafted
- Playing career: 2004–2021
- Position: Power forward
- Number: 12, 14

Career history
- 2004–2009: Partizan
- 2009–2012: Real Madrid
- 2013: Mega Vizura
- 2013–2014: Brose Baskets
- 2014: Mega Vizura
- 2014–2016: Trabzonspor
- 2016–2021: Partizan

Career highlights
- EuroLeague Rising Star (2009); Spanish Cup winner (2012); 3× ABA League champion (2007–2009); ABA League Final Four MVP (2009); 2× All-ABA League Team (2017, 2018); 3× Serbian League champion (2007–2009); Serbian League MVP (2009); Serbian League Playoffs MVP (2009); 5× Serbian Cup winner (2008, 2009, 2018–2020); Serbian Cup MVP (2009); YUBA League champion (2005, 2006)
Medals
Men's basketball
Representing Serbia
EuroBasket
Silver medal – second place	2009 Poland	Team
Representing Serbia and Montenegro
U20 European Championship
Gold medal – first place	2006 Turkey	Team
Bronze medal – third place	2005 Russia	Team

Novica Veličković (Serbian Cyrillic: Новица Величковић; born 5 October 1986) is a Serbian former professional basketball player who is currently the player development coach for Partizan Mozzart Bet. He also represented the senior Serbian national basketball team internationally.

== Professional career ==
Veličković started playing basketball for KK Drvomarket in 1996. Then he played for Zemun from 1998 to 2001 before signing with KK Partizan in 2001.

=== Partizan ===
Veličković made his professional debut with Partizan during the 2004–05 season. He made his EuroLeague debut on 3 November 2005 against Pau-Orthez, scoring 2 points. In the 2007–08 season, Veličković had a bigger role in the team. On 16 January 2008 in an 88–87 loss to Lottomatica Roma, he scored 22 points and 9 rebounds, his best game in new season. He led the team with 11 points and 4 rebounds to the EuroLeague Quarterfinals in an 82–73 win over Panathinaikos on 19 March 2008. Over the season, in 22 EuroLeague games, Veličković averaged 10.6 points, 6.9 rebounds, and 1.6 assists per game. As of 2018, Veličković was the only player to not be drafted by any NBA team in an NBA draft.

In February 2009, he won the Serbian Cup in an 80–65 win over Crvena zvezda and he was the MVP of the competition. On 31 March 2009, Veličković scored a career-high 26 points against CSKA Moscow. On 18 April 2009, he helped his team with 17 points and 8 rebounds in a 63–49 win over Cibona to win the 2008–09 ABA League trophy. For his performances, he was named the Adriatic League Final Four MVP. In April 2009, he won the EuroLeague Rising Star award for the 2008–09 season. Partizan finished the season by winning 8th consecutive Serbian League title, after once again defeating their archrivals, Crvena zvezda, 3–2 in the league's finals series. Veličković was named the Serbian Super League MVP and MVP of the Finals.

=== Real Madrid ===
Veličković was seen as the first target of Real Madrid's new coach Ettore Messina. His transfer, with the signing of a two-year contract with an option for a third one, was made official on 23 June 2009. In June 2012, Real Madrid decided to release Veličković due to the numerous injuries.

=== 2013–2016 ===
On 31 January 2013, he signed a short-term contract with the Serbian team Mega Vizura. In the game against Radnički Kragujevac on 12 May, he recorded season-best 37 points while shooting 11 from 16 from the field and grabbed 8 rebounds.

On 5 August 2013, Veličković signed a contract for the upcoming season with the German team Brose Baskets. He was released on 20 February 2014. Four days later, he returned to Mega Vizura for the remainder of the season.

On 21 June 2014, he signed a one-year contract with the Turkish team Trabzonspor. On 24 May 2015, he extended his contract with Trabzonspor for one more season.

=== Return to Partizan ===
On 1 March 2016, Veličković left Trabzonspor and signed with his former club Partizan for the rest of the season. On 7 May, Veličković made his re-debut for Partizan against Borac Čačak and recorded 9 points, 2 rebounds and 3 assists.

On 14 September 2016, Veličković re-signed with Partizan for the 2016–17 season, and he became the new team captain. In March 2017, he was selected for the ideal team of the 2016–17 ABA League season, after averaging 11.2 points, 5.5 rebounds and 1.9 assists over 26 games.

On 18 September 2017, he re-signed with Partizan for the 2017–18 season. On 18 February 2018, in Final of 2017–18 Radivoj Korać Cup, Veličković played his 400th match for the club. He helped the club to win their first trophy in almost four years, with 13 points, 7 rebounds and 1 assist in an 81–75 win over Crvena zvezda. In 21 games of the 2017–18 ABA League First Division, he averaged 12.1 points, 5.3 rebounds and 2.4 assists per game.

On 10 August 2018, Veličković signed a one-year contract extension with Partizan. In 2018–19 season, after struggling with conditioning and game shape in the beginning of the season, he regained trust of head coach Andrea Trinchieri and saw increased minutes until the end of the season. In the 2018–19 ABA League First Division, he averaged 4.8 points, 2.6 rebounds and 1.1 assists over 11.8 minutes played per games. Partizan defended the Radivoj Korać Cup trophy, but failed to win championships in ABA League and Serbian League.

On 18 January 2020, Veličković broke the club record with 472 games played for the club, surpassing Petar Božić at the all-time list. He won the 2019–20 Radivoj Korać Cup with Partizan in February 2020. Over 18 ABA League games, he averaged 6.3 points and 2.8 rebounds per game. In EuroCup, he appeared in 8 games and averaged 7.9 points and 4.2 rebounds before the season was cancelled due to COVID-19 pandemic. On 1 September 2020, he re-signed with Partizan.

In the 2020–21 season, which would be his last season as professional player, Veličković averaged 4.6 points and 2.6 rebounds over 17 ABA League games, while shooting 42.9% from the field goal. In Eurocup, he appeared in 5 games and averaged 5.3 points and 2.3 rebounds per game. On 8 July 2021, he announced his retirement from his basketball career at age 34. During his career, he made a record 509 appearances for Partizan. Veličković's last game was coach Željko Obradović's first after his return to the club since 1993.

== National team career ==
Veličković was a member of the U20 Serbian national teams in 2005 and 2006 in Chekhov and İzmir respectively. He made his debut with the senior Serbian national team at the EuroBasket 2007, in Spain, and he also won the silver medal at the EuroBasket 2009, in Poland. He was also a member of the Serbian national team at the 2010 FIBA World Championship, where Serbia was defeated 99-88 by Lithuania in the game for the bronze medal.

== Career statistics ==
Legend
GP	Games played	GS	Games started	MPG	Minutes per game
FG%	Field-goal percentage	3P%	3-point field-goal percentage	FT%	Free-throw percentage
RPG	Rebounds per game	APG	Assists per game	SPG	Steals per game
BPG	Blocks per game	PPG	Points per game	PIR	Performance index rating
**Bold**	Career high

=== EuroLeague ===
Year	Team	GP	GS	MPG	FG%	3P%	FT%	RPG	APG	SPG	BPG	PPG	PIR
2005–06	Partizan	12	0	3.4	**.714**	**.500**	.333	.5	.0	.3	.0	1.0	-0.1
2006–07	Partizan	20	1	7.0	.500	.500	.520	1.8	.3	.5	.1	2.8	3.0
2007–08	Partizan	**22**	**21**	**28.2**	.446	.299	.750	**6.9**	1.6	**.8**	.3	10.6	**11.7**
2008–09	Partizan	19	15	26.1	.428	.324	.750	5.1	**1.8**	**.8**	**.4**	**11.5**	**11.7**
2009–10	Real Madrid	16	8	22.6	.500	.417	.576	4.1	**1.8**	**.8**	.3	7.9	9.1
2010–11	Real Madrid	19	2	12.1	.416	.333	.462	2.8	.5	.2	.2	3.4	3.3
2011–12	Real Madrid	7	1	11.5	.414	.300	.250	1.9	1.6	.7	.1	4.1	3.9
2013–14	Brose Baskets	5	4	20.0	.357	.083	**.833**	2.8	1.2	.4	.0	7.2	4.8
Career		120	52	17.2	.446	.310	.632	3.7	1.1	.6	.2	6.4	6.6

==== Career highs ====
- Points: **26** vs. CSKA Moscow 31/03/09
- Rebounds: **13** vs. Brose Baskets 24/01/08
- Assists: **7** vs. Panionios Forthnet 07/01/09
- Steals: **4** vs. Unicaja Málaga 11/02/09
- Blocks: **2** vs. Lottomatica Roma 09/12/10

== Post-playing career ==
On 28 July 2022, Mega Basket hired Veličković as their new team manager.

Sporting positions
Preceded by Milenko Tepić	Team manager of KK Mega Basket; 2022–2025	Succeeded by Aleksandar Rašić
