= Stefan Pot =

Serbian basketball player (born 1994)

Personal information
- Born: July 15, 1994 (age 32) Bijeljina, Bosnia and Herzegovina
- Listed height: 1.96 m (6 ft 5 in)
- Listed weight: 86 kg (190 lb)

Career information
- NBA draft: 2016: undrafted
- Playing career: 2009–present
- Position: Point guard

Career history
- 2009–2010: Spartak Subotica
- 2010–2011: Novi Sad
- 2012–2014: Vojvodina Srbijagas
- 2014–2015: CSU Asesoft Ploiești
- 2015: Metalac
- 2015–2016: Mladost Zemun
- 2016–2017: Partizan
- 2017–2020: FMP
- 2020–2021: Igokea
- 2021–2022: Kolossos Rodou
- 2022–2024: Falco KC Szombathely
- 2024–2025: Antwerp Giants
- 2026: Slovan Bratislava

Career highlights
- Romanian League champion (2015); Bosnian Cup winner (2021); Hungarian Cup winner (2023); 2x Hungarian League champion (2023,2024)
Medals
Men's basketball
Representing Serbia
U20 European Championship
Bronze medal – third place	2014 Greece	U20 Team
U19 World Championship
Silver medal – second place	2013 Czech Republic	U19 Team
U18 European Championship
Bronze medal – third place	2012 Lithuania/Latvia	U18 Team

Stefan Pot (Serbian Cyrillic: Стефан Пот; born 15 July 1994) is a Serbian professional basketball player who last played for Slovan Bratislava of the Slovak Basketball League (SBL) and the ABA League.

== Playing career ==
Pot has started his professional career at Spartak Subotica, from which he moved to Novi Sad and afterwards to CSU Asesoft Ploiești in Romania. After that he returned to Serbia, where he appeared for Metalac and Mladost Zemun. The peak of his career came in the 2016–17 ABA season, when he signed with Partizan NIS and after that season he spent three seasons with FMP.

In August 2020, Pot signed for the Bosnian ABA team Igokea. He averaged 8.0 points, 3.3 assists and 2.3 rebounds per game.

On September 25, 2021, Pot signed with Kolossos Rodou of the Greek Basket League, replacing Ty Lawson. In 26 games, he averaged 8 points, 3.7 rebounds, 4.7 assists and 0.6 steals, playing around 24 minutes per contest.
