= Stefan Birčević =

Serbian basketball player

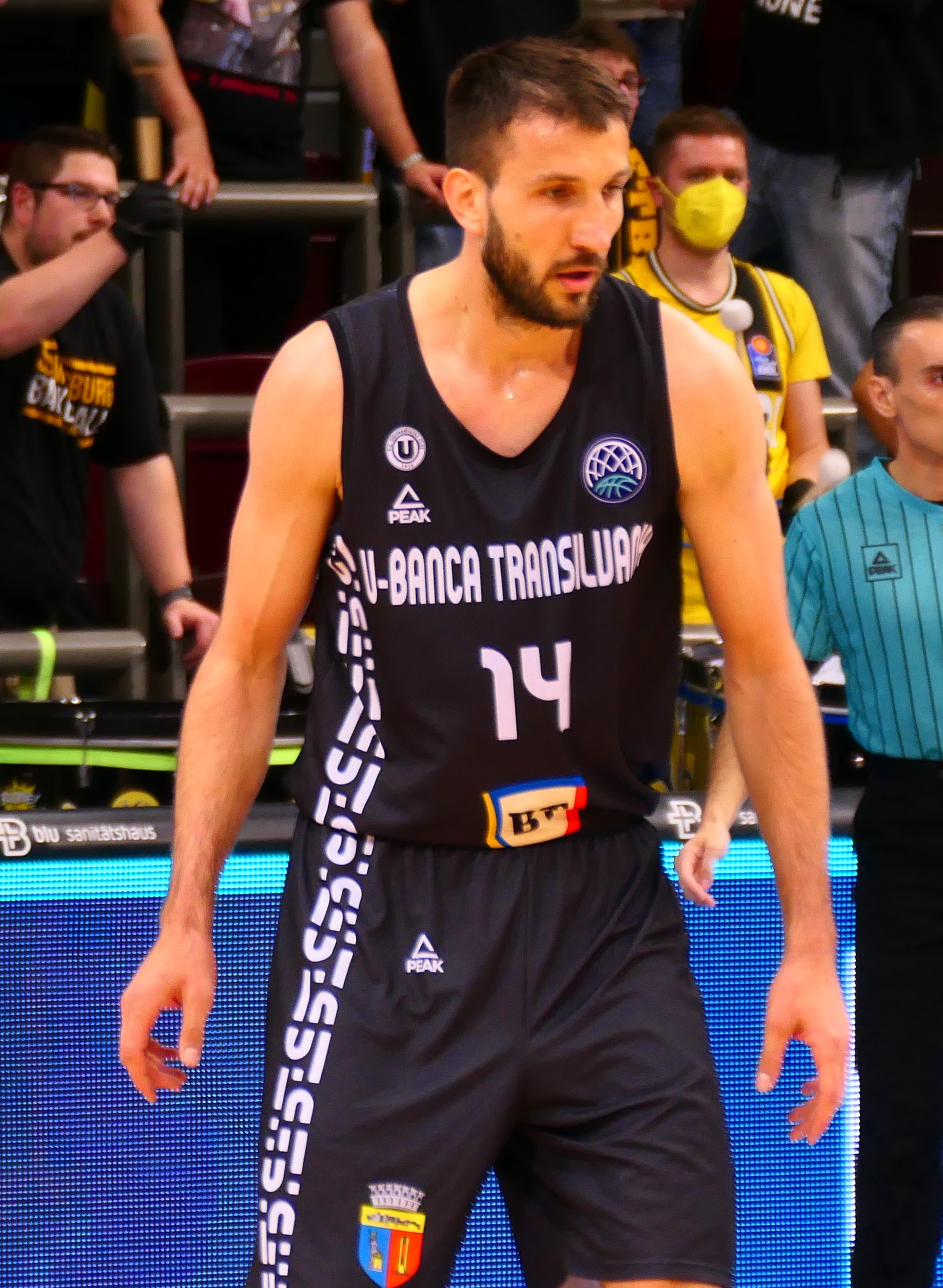
- Birčević with U-BT Cluj-Napoca in April 2022

Personal information
- Born: 13 December 1989 (age 36) Lazarevac, SR Serbia, SFR Yugoslavia
- Listed height: 2.10 m (6 ft 11 in)
- Listed weight: 100 kg (220 lb)

Career information
- NBA draft: 2011: undrafted
- Playing career: 2007–2025
- Position: Power forward
- Number: 14

Career history
- 2007–2011: Metalac Valjevo
- 2011–2014: Radnički Kragujevac
- 2014–2016: Estudiantes
- 2016–2017: Partizan
- 2017–2018: İstanbul BB
- 2018: Banvit
- 2018–2019: Telekom Baskets Bonn
- 2019–2020: Partizan
- 2021: Bursaspor
- 2021–2023: U-BT Cluj-Napoca
- 2023: Mitteldeutscher
- 2023–2024: Lietkabelis Panevėžys
- 2024–2025: Kolubara

Career highlights
- ABA Supercup winner (2019); Serbian Cup winner (2020); 2× Romanian League champion (2022, 2023); Romanian Cup champion (2023); Romanian Supercup champion (2022)
Medals
Men's basketball
Representing Serbia
Summer Olympics
Silver medal – second place	2016 Rio de Janeiro	Team
World Championship
Silver medal – second place	2014 Spain	Team
EuroBasket
Silver medal – second place	2017 Finland–Israel–Romania–Turkey	Team
Universiade
Gold medal – first place	2011 Shenzhen

Stefan Birčević (Serbian: Стефан Бирчевић, born 13 December 1989) is a Serbian former professional basketball player. He represented the senior Serbian national basketball team. Standing at 2.10 m (6 ft 10 1/2 in), he played the power forward position.

== Professional career ==
Birčević played with Metalac Valjevo, before joining Radnički Kragujevac in the summer of 2011. In August 2014, he moved to Spain and signed with CB Estudiantes. On 13 June 2016 he signed a two-year contract with Serbian club Partizan.

On 13 July 2017, Birčević signed with Turkish club İstanbul BŞB for the 2017–18 season.

On 4 December 2018, Birčević signed with German club Baskets Bonn for the rest of 2018–19 season.

On 23 August 2019, Birčević signed with Partizan for the 2019–20 season.

On 16 December 2020, Birčević signed with Borac Čačak for the rest of 2020–21 season. He left the team 10 days later, prior his debut for Borac. On 28 December, he signed for the Hiroshima Dragonflies of the B.League. However, due to COVID-19 pandemic travel restrictions he never manage to join the Hiroshima Dragonflies and left the team prior his debut.

In February 2021, Birčević signed for Turkish club Frutti Extra Bursaspor.

On 13 July 2021, he signed with U-BT Cluj-Napoca of the Romanian Liga Națională.

On 21 August 2023, Birčević signed a one-year deal with Mitteldeutscher BC of the German Basketball Bundesliga. He parted ways with the team on 23 October.

On 11 November 2023, Birčević signed with Lietkabelis Panevėžys of the Lithuanian Basketball League (LKL) for the rest of the season. On 6 February 2024, Birčević parted ways with the team.

== National team career ==
Birčević won the gold medal with the Serbian university team at the 2011 Summer Universiade in Shenzhen. Birčević was a member of the Serbian national basketball team that won the silver medal at the 2014 FIBA Basketball World Cup.

Birčević also represented Serbia at the 2016 Summer Olympics where they won the silver medal, after losing to the United States in the final game with 96–66.

Birčević also represented Serbia at the EuroBasket 2017 where they won the silver medal, after losing in the final game to Slovenia.

At the 2019 FIBA Basketball World Cup, the national team of Serbia was dubbed as favorite to win the trophy, but was eventually upset in the quarterfinals by Argentina. With wins over the United States and Czech Republic, it finished in fifth place. Birčević averaged 4.8 points and 2.8 rebounds over 6 tournament games.

== See also ==
- List of Olympic medalists in basketball
