= Branislav Ratkovica =

Serbian basketball player and coach

Mladost Zemun
- Title: Head coach
- League: Serbian League

Personal information
- Born: 27 July 1985 (age 41) Gradačac, SR Bosnia and Herzegovina, SFR Yugoslavia
- Listed height: 1.93 m (6 ft 4 in)
- Listed weight: 82 kg (181 lb)

Career information
- NBA draft: 2007: undrafted
- Playing career: 2002–2019
- Position: Point guard
- Number: 6, 23, 33
- Coaching career: 2019–present

Career history

Playing
- 2002–2006: Beopetrol / Atlas
- 2004–2005: →Avala Ada
- 2006–2007: Mega Vizura
- 2007–2008: EWE Baskets Oldenburg
- 2008–2011: Walter Tigers Tübingen
- 2011–2012: Aliağa Petkim
- 2012–2013: Olin Edirne
- 2013: Artland Dragons
- 2013: Politekhnika-Halychyna
- 2013–2015: Walter Tigers Tübingen
- 2015–2016: Lukoil Academic
- 2016–2017: Partizan
- 2017–2018: Cibona
- 2018–2019: Mega Bemax
- 2019: OKK Beograd

Coaching
- 2019–2020: Mega Bemax (assistant)
- 2020–2021: OKK Beograd
- 2021–2023: Metalac
- 2025–present: Mladost Zemun

Career highlights
- As player: Bulgarian League champion (2016); Serbian League assists leader (2017); German League assists leader (2015)
Medals
Men's basketball
Representing Serbia and Montenegro
U20 European Championship
Bronze medal – third place	2005 Russia	National Team

Branislav Ratkovica (Serbian Cyrillic: Бранислав Ратковица; born 27 July 1985) is a Serbian professional basketball coach and former player. He currently serves as a head coach for Mladost Zemun of the Serbian League (KLS).

== Professional career ==
Ratkovica started playing basketball for KK Drvomarket.

He made his professional debut for KK Atlas (then called Beopetrol) during the 2002–03 season. In the following season, Ratkovica made his debut in the ULEB Cup. For the 2004–05 season he was loaned to Avala Ada.

In the summer of 2007, Ratkovica signed a one-year contract with German team EWE Baskets Oldenburg. In the summer of 2008, Ratkovica moved to Walter Tigers Tübingen.

After four years in Germany, Ratkovica signed a two-year contract with the Turkish club Aliağa Petkim. Ratkovica started the 2012–13 season with Aliağa Petkim, but he left the club after some matches and signed a one-year contract with Olin Edirne Basket.

In February 2013, he returned to Germany and signed with Artland Dragons for the rest of the season. The 2013–14 season Ratkovica started in Politekhnika-Halychyna, but after two games he left the club and signed for the rest of the season with Walter Tigers Tübingen. He also played there the 2014–15 season, where he was the League's assists leader. During the 2014–15 season, Ratkovica averaged 9.6 points, 2.8 rebounds and 7.2 assists.

In July 2015, Ratkovica signed with PBC Lukoil Academic. He played in the FIBA Europe Cup, where he averaged 7.9 points, 2.7 rebounds and 5.3 assists per game. He also won the Bulgarian League.

In July 2016, he signed a one-year contract with Partizan. On November 30, 2017, he signed a contract with Cibona.

== Coaching career ==
On 5 July 2019, Ratkovica was named an assistant coach for Mega Bemax of the Basketball League of Serbia.

On 5 June 2020, Ratkovica left Mega Bemax for OKK Beograd, which he took over as the head coach. He left Beograd in May 2021.

On 7 June 2021, Metalac Valjevo named Ratkovica as their new head coach.
