= Adin Vrabac =

Bosnian basketball player (born 1994)

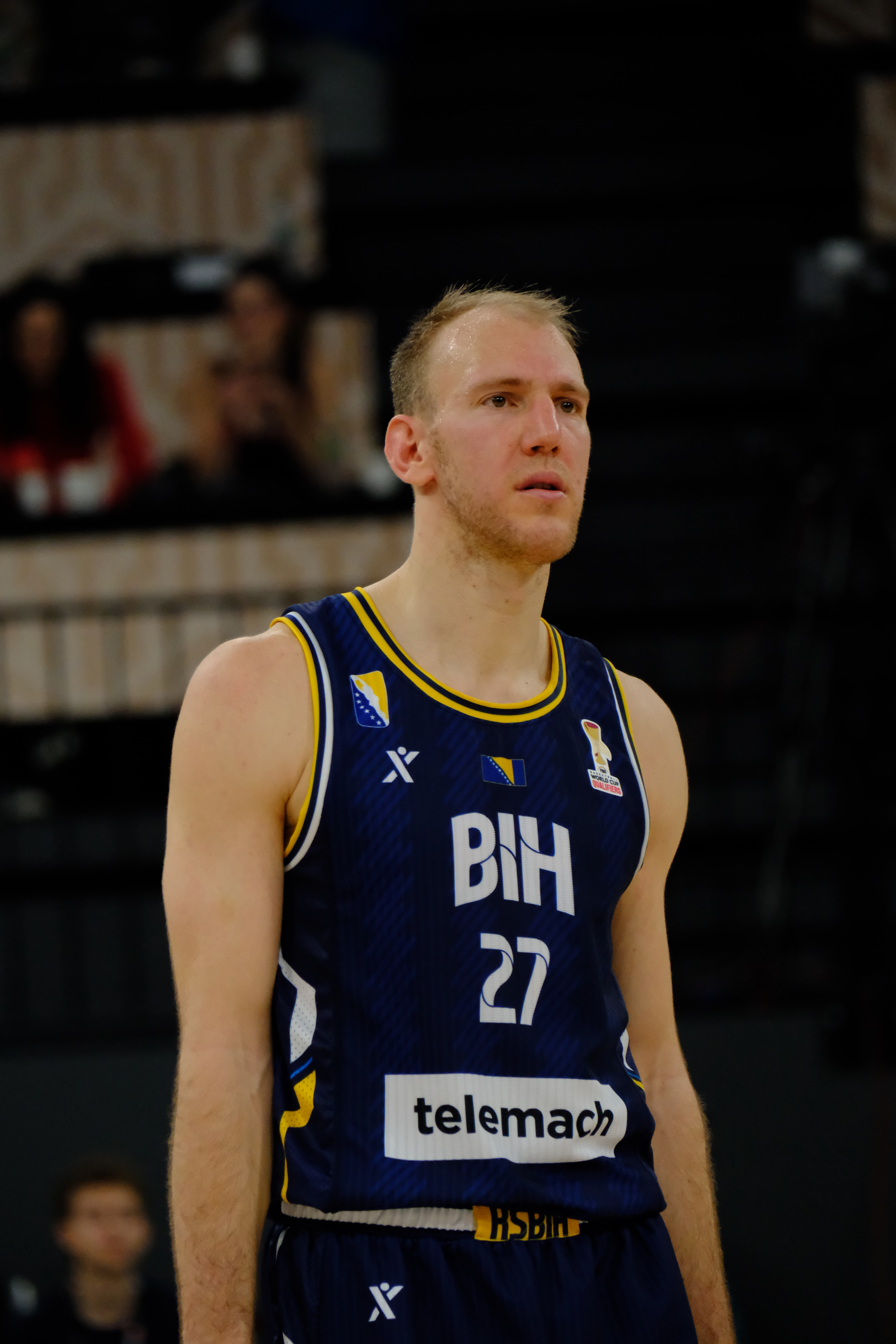
- Vrabac with Bosnia and Herzegovina in 2025

No. 7 – Bosna
- Position: Small forward
- League: ABA League; EuroCup

Personal information
- Born: 27 January 1994 (age 32) Sarajevo, Bosnia and Herzegovina
- Listed height: 2.06 m (6 ft 9 in)
- Listed weight: 95 kg (209 lb)

Career information
- NBA draft: 2015: undrafted
- Playing career: 2013–present

Career history
- 2013–2014: Spars
- 2014–2015: Gladiators Treves
- 2015–2017: Partizan
- 2017: Canarias
- 2018: Hamburg Towers
- 2018–2020: Spars
- 2020–2021: Krka
- 2021–2022: Vienna
- 2022–2023: Mons-Hainaut
- 2023–2024: ALM Évreux
- 2024–2025: Bosna
- 2025–2025: Szolnoki Olajbányász
- 2026: Ourense
- 2026–present: Bosna

Career highlights
- FIBA Intercontinental Cup champion (2017); Bosnian Cup winner (2020); Slovenian Cup winner (2021)

Adin Vrabac (born 27 January 1994) is a Bosnian professional basketball player for Bosna of the ABA League and the EuroCup. He is a 2.06 m (6 ft 9 in) tall small forward, and is a member of the Bosnia and Herzegovina national team.

== Professional career ==
Adin Vrabac started his career with OKK Spars in the Bosnian League. In 2013, he was promoted to the first team. Vrabac averaged 10.7 points, 3.1 rebounds and 2.6 assists.

On 26 June 2014, Vrabac signed a four-year contract with German club TBB Trier. On 14 March 2015, Vrabac was the most efficient player in his team with Vitalis Chikoko against Alba Berlin in Mercedes-Benz Arena, he scored 18 points and had 3 rebounds. In 2014–15 Basketball Bundesliga, he averaged 6.3 points, 2.3 rebounds and 1.2 assists.

On 30 September 2015, Vrabac signed a two-year contract with Serbian club Partizan.

On 4 August 2017, Vrabac signed with Spanish club Tenerife for the 2017–18 season. On 9 December 2017, he parted ways with Iberostar Tenerife. On 5 January 2018, he signed with German ProA club Hamburg Towers for the rest of the 2017–18 season. On 6 August 2018, he came back to Bosnia and Herzegovina and signed with Spars for the 2018–19 season. Vrabac won the Bosnian Cup, officially known as the Mirza Delibašić Cup in the 2019–20 season on 16 February 2020, beating Igokea in the final. Vrabac signed in Slovenia with Krka on 17 July 2020.

On 22 June 2022, Vrabac signed for Belfius Mons-Hainaut of the BNXT League.

On July 9, 2025, he signed with Szolnoki Olajbányász of the Nemzeti Bajnokság I/A.

On February 5, 2026, he signed for Club Ourense Baloncesto of the Primera FEB.

== National team career ==
Vrabac has also been a member of the senior men's Bosnia and Herzegovina national basketball team. With Bosnia's senior national team, he played at the EuroBasket 2015 and EuroBasket 2022.

== Career statistics ==
Legend
GP	Games played	MPG	Minutes per game	FG%	Field goal percentage
3P%	3-point field goal percentage	FT%	Free throw percentage	RPG	Rebounds per game
APG	Assists per game	SPG	Steals per game	BPG	Blocks per game
PPG	Points per game	**Bold**	Career high		Led the league

=== Domestic and regional leagues ===
Year	Team	League	GP	MPG	FG%	3P%	FT%	RPG	APG	SPG	BPG	PPG	
2013–14	OKK Spars	Bosnian League	30		25.7	**.548**	.216	**.631**	3.1	**2.6**	1	.2	**10.7**
2014–15	TBB Trier	BBL	**32**		19.6	.460	**.244**	.526	2.3	1.2	.3	.2	6.3
2015–16	Partizan	ABA League	25		**15.6**	.379	.143	.333	**4.7**	1.7	**2.3**	**.7**	4.2

== Honours ==
- National Cups (1×):
  - Bosnian Cup: **1** (with Spars: 2019–20)
- International Cups (1×):
  - FIBA Intercontinental Cup: **1** (with Canarias: 2017)
