= Đorđe Majstorović =

Serbian basketball player (born 1990)

Čačak 94
- Position: Power forward / center
- League: Second Basketball League of Serbia

Personal information
- Born: 13 March 1990 (age 36) Čačak, SR Serbia, SFR Yugoslavia
- Listed height: 2.08 m (6 ft 10 in)
- Listed weight: 102 kg (225 lb)

Career information
- NBA draft: 2012: undrafted
- Playing career: 2008–present

Career history
- 2008–2009: Crvena zvezda Reserves
- 2009–2010: CB Majadahonda
- 2011–2012: Smederevo 1953
- 2012–2014: Helios Domžale
- 2014–2016: Metalac Farmakom
- 2016–2017: Partizan
- 2017–2018: MZT Skopje
- 2018–2020: Borac Čačak
- 2021–present: Čačak 94

Career highlights
- Macedonian Cup winner (2018)
Medals
Men's basketball
Representing Serbia
Universiade
| Bronze medal – third place | 2013 Kazan | Team |
Mediterranean Games
| Silver medal – second place | 2013 Mersin | Team |

Đorđe Majstorović (Serbian Cyrillic: Ђорђе Мајсторовић, born 13 March 1990) is a Serbian professional basketball player for Čačak 94 of the Second Basketball League of Serbia. He plays as a center and a power forward.

During the 2017–18 season, Majstorović played for MZT Skopje of the Macedonian League. In August 2021, he signed for Čačak 94 of the Second Basketball League of Serbia.
