= 2015–16 KK Crvena zvezda season =

Serbian basketball club season

Crvena zvezda Telekom
2015–16 season
- President: (Serbia) Nebojša Čović
- Head coach: (Montenegro) Dejan Radonjić
- Arena: Pionir Hall; Kombank Arena
- Serbian League: 1st
- Playoffs: Champions
- Adriatic League: 2nd
- Playoffs: Champions
- EuroLeague: Quarterfinals
- Radivoj Korać Cup: Semifinals
- Highest home attendance: 18,150 (Note: Euroleague season record); 69–67 Panathinaikos (11 March 2016)
Home	Away
- All statistics correct as of March 30, 2018.

The 2015–16 season was the 71st season in the existence of the club. The team played in the Basketball League of Serbia, in the Adriatic League and in the Euroleague.

== Overview ==
The team started preparing for season 2015–16 by re-signing coach Dejan Radonjić and guard Branko Lazić for two years each. Team captain Luka Mitrović extended his contract until summer 2017. Marcus Williams, Boban Marjanović, Nikola Kalinić, Charles Jenkins and Jaka Blažič left the club, and roster was reinforced by Sofoklis Schortsanitis, Stefan Nastić, Ryan Thompson and Gal Mekel. From its development team FMP, Zvezda promoted MVP of 2015 FIBA Europe Under-20 Championship, Marko Gudurić. The first part of the season was marked by mixed results and a lot of squad changes. Due to serious injuries of Mitrović and Nemanja Dangubić, the club brought back Marko Simonović, and later on landed Quincy Miller. Out-of-form Schortsanitis and Mekel were replaced by Vladimir Štimac and returning Marcus Williams. Mid-season, the club also released Williams and Thompson, replacing them with Vasilije Micić and Tarence Kinsey. Results improved, and Red Star ended group stage of EuroLeague with a 5–5 score, reaching the third place of group A, qualifying for Top 16 stage. The successful European season continued as Zvezda ended fourth in Top 16 Group E, with a score of 7 wins and seven losses. In the playoffs, it was stopped by CSKA Moscow, who eventually went on to lift EuroLeague trophy. In ABA league, Zvezda entered playoffs from the second position, facing another EuroLeague team – Cedevita – and, defeating them twice, advanced to final series. In the finals, Zvezda pulled a 3-0 against Mega Leks, defending the ABA league title. Zvezda ended another spectacular season by defending the Serbian league title beating Partizan 3-1 in the finals.

== Players ==
=== Squad information ===
Note: Flags indicate national team eligibility at FIBA sanctioned events. Players may hold other non-FIBA nationality not displayed.

Crvena zvezda roster
Players
Coaches

Pos.	No.	Nat.	Name	Ht.	Wt.	Age
G/F	6	(Serbia)	Dangubić, Nemanja	2.04 m (6 ft 8 in)	88 kg (194 lb)	33 – 13 April 1993
G/F	23	(Serbia)	Gudurić, Marko	1.96 m (6 ft 5 in)	91 kg (201 lb)	31 – 8 March 1995
PG	24	(Serbia)	Jović, Stefan	1.98 m (6 ft 6 in)	94 kg (207 lb)	36 – 3 November 1990
G/F	1	(United States)	Kinsey, Tarence	2.00 m (6 ft 7 in)	84 kg (185 lb)	42 – 21 March 1984
G/F	10	(Serbia)	Lazić, Branko	1.95 m (6 ft 5 in)	87 kg (192 lb)	37 – 12 January 1989
PG	13	(Serbia)	Micić, Vasilije (L)	1.97 m (6 ft 6 in)	92 kg (203 lb)	32 – 13 January 1994
F	30	(United States)	Miller, Quincy	2.08 m (6 ft 10 in)	107 kg (236 lb)	34 – 18 November 1992
PF	9	(Serbia)	Mitrović, Luka (C)	2.05 m (6 ft 9 in)	102 kg (225 lb)	33 – 21 March 1993
PG	4	(Serbia)	Rebić, Nikola	1.88 m (6 ft 2 in)	80 kg (176 lb)	31 – 22 January 1995
PF	12	(Serbia)	Simanić, Boriša	2.09 m (6 ft 10 in)	92 kg (203 lb)	28 – 20 March 1998
SF	19	(Serbia)	Simonović, Marko	2.03 m (6 ft 8 in)	95 kg (209 lb)	40 – 30 May 1986
C	51	(Serbia)	Štimac, Vladimir	2.11 m (6 ft 11 in)	116 kg (256 lb)	39 – 25 August 1987
C	33	(Germany)	Zirbes, Maik	2.08 m (6 ft 10 in)	115 kg (254 lb)	36 – 29 January 1990

Head coach

- (Montenegro) Dejan Radonjić

Assistant coach(es)

- (Montenegro) Borko Radović
- (Serbia) Saša Kosović

Team manager

- (Serbia) Nebojša Ilić

Legend

- (C) Team captain
- (L) On loan
- Injured

- Roster
Updated: 23 May 2016

=== Depth Chart ===
Pos.	Starting 5	Bench 1	Bench 2	Reserves
C	Maik Zirbes	Vladimir Štimac
PF	Quincy Miller	Luka Mitrović		Boriša Simanić
SF	Nemanja Dangubić	Marko Simonović	Marko Gudurić
SG	Tarence Kinsey	Branko Lazić
PG	Stefan Jović	Vasilije Micić	Nikola Rebić

=== Out on Loan ===
KK Crvena zvezda players out on loan
Nat.	Player	Position	Team	On loan since
(Serbia)	Ognjen Dobrić	SG/SF	(Serbia) FMP	August 2014
(Serbia)	Stefan Lazarević	SG/SF	(Serbia) FMP	August 2014
(Serbia)	Marko Radovanović	PF	(Serbia) FMP	August 2014
(Serbia)	Danilo Ostojić	SF	(Serbia) FMP	August 2014
(Serbia)	Aleksa Radanov	SG/SF	(Serbia) FMP	August 2015
(Serbia)	David Miladinović	Center	(Serbia) FMP	August 2015
(Serbia)	Stefan Kenić	SF	(Serbia) FMP	August 2015
(Serbia)	Aleksandar Aranitović	SG	(Serbia) Mega Leks	August 2015
(Serbia)	Dejan Davidovac	SF	(Serbia) FMP	August 2015
(Serbia)	Dragan Apić	PF	(Serbia) FMP	August 2015
(Serbia)	Marko Tejić	PF	(Serbia) FMP	April 2016

=== Players in ===
Position	#	Player	Moving from	Ref.
SF	23	(Serbia) Marko Gudurić	(Serbia) FMP (Loan back)	
PF	12	(Serbia) Boriša Simanić	(Serbia) FMP (Loan back)	
PF/C	–	(Serbia) Dragan Apić	(Serbia) Vršac Swisslion	
SF	–	(Serbia) Dejan Davidovac	(Serbia) Vršac Swisslion	
C	22	(Serbia) Stefan Nastić	(United States) Stanford	
C	21	(Greece) Sofoklis Schortsanitis	(Israel) Maccabi Tel Aviv	
PG	7	(Israel) Gal Mekel	(Russia) Nizhny Novgorod	
SG/SF	5	(United States) Ryan Thompson	(Germany) Brose Baskets	
SF	19	(Serbia) Marko Simonović	(France) Élan Béarnais Pau-Orthez	
SF/PF	30	(United States) Quincy Miller	(United States) Grand Rapids Drive	
C	51	(Serbia) Vladimir Štimac	(Spain) Estudiantes	
PG	3	(United States) Marcus Williams	Free Agent	
PG	13	(Serbia) Vasilije Micić	(Germany) FC Bayern Munich (Loan)	
SG/SF	1	(United States) Tarence Kinsey	(Turkey) Trabzonspor	

=== Players out ===
Position	#	Player	Moving to	Ref.
PG	3	(United States) Marcus Williams	Free Agent	
SG/SF	–	(Serbia) Vojislav Stojanović^{1}	(Italy) Orlandina Basket	
SG	–	(Serbia) Brano Đukanović^{1}	(Serbia) Metalac Valjevo	
SF	5	(Serbia) Nikola Čvorović	(Serbia) Vršac Swisslion	
SG/PG	22	(United States) Charles Jenkins	(Italy) Emporio Armani Milano	
SF/PF	12	(Serbia) Nikola Kalinić	(Turkey) Fenerbahçe	
SG/SF	11	(Slovenia) Jaka Blažič	(Spain) Laboral Kutxa	
C	13	(Serbia) Boban Marjanović	(United States) San Antonio Spurs	
C	14	(Serbia) Đorđe Kaplanović	(Poland) Asseco Gdynia	
C	21	(Greece) Sofoklis Schortsanitis	(Greece) P.A.O.K.	
PG	7	(Israel) Gal Mekel	(Israel) Maccabi Tel Aviv	
SG/SF	5	(United States) Ryan Thompson	(Turkey) Trabzonspor	
PG	3	(United States) Marcus Williams	Free Agent	
PF	15	(Serbia) Marko Tejić	(Serbia) FMP (Loan)	
C	22	(Serbia) Stefan Nastić	Free agent	

Notes:

- ^{1} On loan during entire 2014–15 season.

== Club ==
=== Technical Staff ===
Position	Staff member
General Manager	(Serbia) Davor Ristović
Sports Director	(Serbia) Mirko Pavlović
Team Manager	(Serbia) Nebojša Ilić
Head coach	(Montenegro) Dejan Radonjić
Assistant coaches	(Montenegro) Borko Radović
Assistant coaches	(Serbia) Nikola Birač
Assistant coaches	(Serbia) Saša Kosović
Conditioning coach	(Montenegro) Dragan Gačević
Physiotherapist	(Serbia) Milorad Ćirić

=== Kit ===
- Supplier: Champion
- Main sponsor: mts
- Back sponsor: Idea
- Short sponsor:

Home	Away

== Competitions ==
=== Overall ===
Competition	Started round	Final position / round	First match	Last match
Adriatic League	Matchday 1	Champions	October 1, 2015	May 2, 2016
EuroLeague	Matchday 1	Quarterfinals	October 15, 2015	April 18, 2016
Serbian Super League	Matchday 1	Champions	May 8, 2016	June 19, 2016
Radivoj Korać Cup	Quarterfinals	Semifinals	February 19, 2016	February 20, 2016

Source: Competitions

=== Overview ===
Competition	Record							
Competition	Pld	W	D	L	PF	PA	PD	Win %
Adriatic League	26	20	0	6	2,046	1,800	+246	76.92
Adriatic League Playoffs	5	5	0	0	419	364	+55	100.00
Serbian League	6	6	0	0	531	384	+147	100.00
Serbian League Playoffs	6	5	0	1	494	409	+85	83.33
Radivoj Korać Cup	2	1	0	1	149	112	+37	50.00
EuroLeague	10	5	0	5	766	813	−47	50.00
EuroLeague Top 16	14	7	0	7	1,038	1,060	−22	50.00
EuroLeague Playoffs	3	0	0	3	221	293	−72	0.00
Total	72	49	0	23	5,664	5,235	+429	68.06

Last updated: March 25, 2018
Source: Competitions

=== Adriatic League ===
==== League table ====
Pos	Team	Pld	W	L	PF	PA	PD	Pts	Qualification or relegation
1	(Montenegro) Budućnost	26	23	3	2032	1774	+258	49	Qualification to playoffs
2	(Serbia) Crvena Zvezda	26	20	6	2046	1800	+246	46	Qualification to playoffs
3	(Croatia) Cedevita	26	19	7	2024	1879	+145	45	Qualification to playoffs
4	(Serbia) Mega Leks	26	17	9	2051	1940	+111	43	Qualification to playoffs
5	(Serbia) Partizan	26	12	14	1973	1974	−1	38	

Source: ABA Standings

==== Results by round ====
Round	1	2	3	4	5	6	7	8	9	10	11	12	13	14	15	16	17	18	19	20	21	22	23	24	25	26
Ground	H	H	A	H	A	H	A	H	A	H	A	H	A	A	A	H	A	H	A	H	A	H	A	H	A	H
Result	W	W	W	W	L	L	W	W	W	L	W	W	W	W	L	W	W	L	W	W	L	W	W	W	W	W
Position	5	1	2	1	1	2	2	2	1	2	2	2	2	2	3	3	3	3	3	2	3	2	2	2	2	2

Source: Competitive matches
Ground: A = Away; H = Home; R = Rest. Result: L = Loss; W = Win; R = Rest; P = Postponed.

Win Loss

==== Playoffs ====
15 March 2016 Semifinals 1	Crvena zvezda (Serbia)	97–88(OT) (Series: 1–0)	(Croatia) Cedevita	Belgrade
18:45 (CET)	Scoring by quarter: 22–14, 15–29, 19–13, 26–26, Overtime: 15–6
	Pts: Miller 24; Rebs: Zirbes 11; Asts: Jović 8 PIR: Zirbes 29	Boxscore	Pts: Pullen 24; Rebs: White 12; Asts: Pullen 5 PIR: White 29	Arena: Hall Aleksandar Nikolić; Attendance: 6,286; Referees: Saša Pukl, Damir Javor, Miloš Koljenšić

22 March 2016 Semifinals 2	Cedevita (Croatia)	65–73 (Series: 0–2)	(Serbia) Crvena zvezda	Zagreb
20:00 (CET)	Scoring by quarter: 19–16, 20–18, 10–21, 16–18
	Pts: Pullen 17; Rebs: Bilan 7 Asts: four players 2 PIR: Pullen 12	Boxscore	Pts: Štimac 17; Rebs: Zirbes 9 Asts: Jović 6 PIR: Miller 20	Arena: Dom Sportova; Attendance: 3,300; Referees: Saša Pukl, Damir Javor, Sašo Petek

28 April 2016 Finals 1	Crvena Zvezda (Serbia)	95–88 (Series: 1–0)	(Serbia) Mega Leks	Belgrade
19:00 (CEST)	Scoring by quarter: 27–25, 21–20, 20–25, 27–18
	Pts: Miller, Zirbes 17; Rebs: Zirbes 12; Asts: Jović 9 PIR: Zirbes 29	Boxscore	Pts: Ivanović 25; Rebs: Nikolić 6 Asts: Ivanović 6 PIR: Ivanović 28	Arena: Hall Aleksandar Nikolić; Attendance: 2,586; Referees: Sreten Radović, Milivoje Jovčić, Siniša Herceg

30 April 2016 Finals 2	Crvena Zvezda (Serbia)	93–74 (Series: 2–0)	(Serbia) Mega Leks	Belgrade
20:00 (CEST)	Scoring by quarter: 26–21, 26–18, 20–21, 21–14
	Pts: Simonović 16; Rebs: three players 5 Asts: Jović 9 PIR: Jović 20	Boxscore	Pts: Ivanović 22; Rebs: Nikolić 7 Asts: Ivanović 5 PIR: Ivanović 22	Arena: Hall Aleksandar Nikolić; Attendance: 3,000; Referees: Ilija Belošević, Petar Obradović, Saša Maričić

2 May 2016 Finals 3	Mega Leks (Serbia)	49–61 (Series: 0–3)	(Serbia) Crvena Zvezda	Sremska Mitrovica
20:30 (CEST)	Scoring by quarter: 16–24, 18–13, 6–9, 9–15
	Pts: Zagorac 21; Rebs: Janković 8 Asts: Ivanović 6 PIR: Zagorac 22	Boxscore	Pts: Miller 18; Rebs: Miller 8 Asts: Jović 6 PIR: Miller 19	Arena: Sports Hall Pinki; Attendance: 2,500; Referees: Saša Pukl, Srđan Dožai, Marko Juras

=== EuroLeague ===
==== Regular season table ====
Pos	Team	Pld	W	L	PF	PA	PD	Qualification
1	(Turkey) Fenerbahçe	10	8	2	770	707	+63	Advance to Top 16
2	(Russia) Khimki	10	5	5	798	740	+58	Advance to Top 16
3	(Serbia) Crvena Zvezda Telekom	10	5	5	766	813	−47	Advance to Top 16
4	(Spain) Real Madrid	10	5	5	854	808	+46	Advance to Top 16
5	(Germany) Bayern Munich	10	4	6	763	780	−17	Transfer to Eurocup
6	(France) Strasbourg	10	3	7	711	814	−103	Transfer to Eurocup

Source: Euroleague

Win Loss

==== Regular season matches ====
15 October 2015 1	Crvena zvezda Telekom (Serbia)	81–59	(France) Strasbourg	Belgrade, Serbia
19:00 (CEST)	Scoring by quarter: 19−20, 24−12, 19−16, 19−11
	Pts: Zirbes 18; Rebs: Zirbes 7 Asts: Mekel, Jović 5 PIR: Zirbes 22	Boxscore	Pts: Beaubois 17; Rebs: Leloup 6 Asts: Lacombe 4 PIR: Beaubois 16	Arena: Kombank Arena; Attendance: 14,338; Referees: Daniel Hierrezuelo (ESP), Jakub Zamojski (POL), Aare Halliko (EST)

22 October 2015 2	Real Madrid (Spain)	98–71	(Serbia) Crvena zvezda Telekom	Madrid, Spain
22:00 (CEST)	Scoring by quarter: 22–6, 34–14, 26–21, 16–30
	Pts: Carroll 19; Rebs: Reyes 8 Asts: Rodríguez 11; PIR: Ayón 26	Boxscore	Pts: Zirbes 15; Rebs: Zirbes 6 Asts: Jović 9 PIR: Jović 20	Arena: Barclaycard Center; Attendance: 11,486; Referees: Fernando Rocha (POR), Spiros Gkontas (GRE), David Romano (ISR)

30 October 2015 3	Khimki (Russia)	91–53	(Serbia) Crvena zvezda Telekom	Moscow, Russia
17:30 (CET)	Scoring by quarter: 22–17, 29–13, 20–9, 20–14
	Pts: Augustine 14; Rebs: three players 5 Asts: Shved 7 PIR: Augustine 25	Boxscore	Pts: Zirbes 15; Rebs: Zirbes 14; Asts: Mekel 4 PIR: Zirbes 18	Arena: Krylatskoye Sports Palace; Attendance: 2,000; Referees: Robert Lottermoser (GER), Elias Koromilas (GRE), Tomislav Hordov (CRO)

6 November 2015 4	Crvena zvezda Telekom (Serbia)	60–74	(Turkey) Fenerbahçe	Belgrade, Serbia
20:00 (CET)	Scoring by quarter: 19–25, 12–20, 11–14, 18–15
	Pts: Štimac 13; Rebs: Štimac 7 Asts: Lazić, Jović 4 PIR: Zirbes, Štimac 12	Boxscore	Pts: Antić 14; Rebs: Antić 7 Asts: Sloukas 3 PIR: Udoh 19	Arena: Kombank Arena; Attendance: 16,203; Referees: Emilio Pérez Pizarro (ESP), Joseph Bissang (FRA), Petros Papapetrou (GRE)

12 November 2015 5	Bayern Munich (Germany)	79–90	(Serbia) Crvena zvezda Telekom	Munich, Germany
20:45 (CET)	Scoring by quarter: 19–19, 24–19, 23–25, 13–27
	Pts: Savanović 19; Rebs: Savanović, Taylor 5 Asts: Renfroe, Gavel 4 PIR: Savanović 19	Boxscore	Pts: Miller 22; Rebs: Miller 6 Asts: Jović 19; PIR: Jović 25	Arena: Audi Dome; Attendance: 6,171; Referees: Luigi Lamonica (ITA), Antonio Conde (ESP), Jurgis Laurinavičius (LTU)

19 November 2015 6	Strasbourg (France)	78–75	(Serbia) Crvena zvezda Telekom	Strasbourg, France
20:30 (CET)	Scoring by quarter: 19–30, 15–22, 22–12, 22–11
	Pts: Leloup 24; Rebs: Leloup 8 Asts: three players 3 PIR: Leloup 26	Boxscore	Pts: Miller 23; Rebs: Miller 12; Asts: Jović 10; PIR: Miller 32	Arena: Rhénus Sport; Attendance: 5,318; Referees: Daniel Hierrezuelo (ESP), Jakub Zamojski (POL), Miloš Koljenšić (MNE)

27 November 2015 7	Crvena zvezda Telekom (Serbia)	94–88	(Spain) Real Madrid	Belgrade, Serbia
20:00 (CET)	Scoring by quarter: 28–18, 18–25, 20–24, 28–21
	Pts: Zirbes 26; Rebs: Miller 7 Asts: three players 4 PIR: Zirbes 32	Boxscore	Pts: Ayón, Rodríguez 16; Rebs: Ayón 7 Asts: Rodríguez 9 PIR: Rodríguez 31	Arena: Pionir; Attendance: 6,744; Referees: Robert Lottermosser (GER), Carmelo Paternico (ITA), Seffi Shemmesh (ISR)

4 December 2015 8	Crvena zvezda Telekom (Serbia)	96–91	(Russia) Khimki	Belgrade, Serbia
20:00 (CET)	Scoring by quarter: 27–26, 23–27, 18–16, 28–22
	Pts: Zirbes 27; Rebs: Miller, Zirbes 7 Asts: Jović 6 PIR: Zirbes 33	Boxscore	Pts: Shved 28; Rebs: Dragić 8 Asts: Shved 6 PIR: Shved 33	Arena: Pionir; Attendance: 6,934; Referees: Fernando Rocha (POR), Boris Shulga (UKR), Clemens Fritz (GER)

11 December 2015 9	Fenerbahçe (Turkey)	79–61	(Serbia) Crvena zvezda Telekom	Istanbul, Turkey
20:45 (CET)	Scoring by quarter: 18–20, 21–17, 19–14, 21–10
	Pts: Udoh 13; Rebs: Datome 8 Asts: Sloukas 7 PIR: Udoh, Datome 19	Boxscore	Pts: Simonović 15; Rebs: Miller 11; Asts: Williams 10; PIR: Štimac 11	Arena: Ülker Sports Arena; Attendance: 8,634; Referees: Luigi Lamonica (ITA), Benjamin Jimenez (ESP), Jurgis Laurinavicius (LTU)

18 December 2015 10	Crvena zvezda Telekom (Serbia)	85–76	(Germany) Bayern Munich	Belgrade, Serbia
19:00 (CET)	Scoring by quarter: 31–20, 13–20, 12–25, 29–11
	Pts: Miller 21; Rebs: Miller 10; Asts: Jović 13; PIR: Zirbes 31	Boxscore	Pts: Savanović 19; Rebs: Savanović 6 Asts: Gavel 6 PIR: Savanović 19	Arena: Pionir Hall; Attendance: 6,458; Referees: Eddie Viator (FRA), Spiros Gkontas (GRE), Vicente Bultó (ESP)

==== Top 16 table ====
Pos	Team	Pld	W	L	PF	PA	PD	Qualification
1	(Turkey) Fenerbahçe	14	11	3	1095	1032	+63	Advance to Playoffs
2	(Russia) Lokomotiv Kuban	14	9	5	1099	978	+121	Advance to Playoffs
3	(Greece) Panathinaikos	14	9	5	1067	1027	+40	Advance to Playoffs
4	(Serbia) Crvena zvezda Telekom	14	7	7	1038	1060	−22	Advance to Playoffs
5	(Turkey) Anadolu Efes	14	7	7	1121	1106	+15	
6	(Turkey) Darüşşafaka Doğuş	14	5	9	1060	1083	−23	
7	(Spain) Unicaja	14	4	10	971	1076	−105	
8	(Croatia) Cedevita	14	4	10	1038	1127	−89	

Source: Euroleague

Win Loss

==== Top 16 matches ====
30 December 2015 1	Anadolu Efes (Turkey)	85–84	(Serbia) Crvena zvezda Telekom	Istanbul, Turkey
18:00 (CET)	Scoring by quarter: 25–23, 19–31, 17–18, 24–12
	Pts: Dunston 21; Rebs: three players 4 Asts: Heurtel 8 PIR: Diebler, Dunston 23	Boxscore	Pts: Zirbes 22; Rebs: Zirbes 12; Asts: Jović 11; PIR: Zirbes 25	Arena: Abdi İpekçi Arena; Attendance: 2,626; Referees: Miguel Ángel Pérez Pérez (ESP), Joseph Bissang (FRA), Marcin Kowalski (POL)

8 January 2016 2	Crvena zvezda Telekom (Serbia)	65–88	(Turkey) Fenerbahçe	Belgrade, Serbia
20:00 (CET)	Scoring by quarter: 20–23, 8–18, 18–22, 19–25
	Pts: Miller 21; Rebs: Zirbes 6 Asts: Kinsey 5 PIR: Miller 27	Boxscore	Pts: Datome 21; Rebs: Veselý 15; Asts: Dixon 11; PIR: Veselý 25	Arena: Pionir; Attendance: 6,421; Referees: Daniel Hierrezuelo (ESP), Petri Mäntylä (FIN), Ioannis Foufis (GRE)

14 January 2016 3	Panathinaikos (Greece)	63–74	(Serbia) Crvena zvezda Telekom	Athens, Greece
20:15 (CET)	Scoring by quarter: 14–16, 20–22, 14–16, 15–20
	Pts: Gist 15; Rebs: Fotsis, Kuzmić 6 Asts: Diamantidis 4 PIR: Raduljica 16	Boxscore	Pts: Zirbes 12; Rebs: Jović 8 Asts: Jović 8 PIR: Jović, Kinsey 15	Arena: Olympic Sports Center Athens; Attendance: 7,061; Referees: Borys Ryzhyk (UKR), Antonio Conde (ESP), Amit Balak (ISR)

22 January 2016 4	Crvena zvezda Telekom (Serbia)	87–73	(Spain) Unicaja	Belgrade, Serbia
20:00 (CET)	Scoring by quarter: 21–14, 20–17, 19–22, 27–20
	Pts: Jović 15; Rebs: Zirbes 6 Asts: Jović, Micić 5 PIR: Jović 24	Boxscore	Pts: Smith 11; Rebs: Hendrix 6 Asts: Hendrix, Smith 3 PIR: Cooley 14	Arena: Pionir; Attendance: 6,421; Referees: Luigi Lamonica (ITA), Matej Boltauzer (SLO), Piotr Pastusiak (POL)

29 January 2016 5	Crvena zvezda Telekom (Serbia)	80–66	(Russia) Lokomotiv Kuban	Belgrade, Serbia
20:00 (CET)	Scoring by quarter: 33–21, 17–16, 17–17, 13–12
	Pts: Miller 24; Rebs: Zirbes 9 Asts: Jović 6 PIR: Miller 25	Boxscore	Pts: Randolph 22; Rebs: Claver 10; Asts: Randolph 4 PIR: Claver 24	Arena: Pionir; Attendance: 6,479; Referees: Miguel Ángel Pérez Pérez (ESP), Tolga Sahin (ITA), Aare Halliko (EST)

4 February 2016 6	Darüşşafaka Doğuş (Turkey)	69–66	(Serbia) Crvena zvezda Telekom	Istanbul, Turkey
19:30 (CET)	Scoring by quarter: 21–19, 20–18, 14–17, 14–12
	Pts: Erden 14; Rebs: Gordon 7 Asts: Gordon, Redding 3 PIR: Erden 19	Boxscore	Pts: Kinsey 16; Rebs: Štimac 10; Asts: Jović 6 PIR: Štimac 13	Arena: Volkswagen Arena; Attendance: 4,678; Referees: Damir Javor (SLO), Boris Shulga (UKR), Ioannis Foufis (GRE)

11 February 2016 7	Crvena zvezda Telekom (Serbia)	94–74	(Croatia) Cedevita	Belgrade, Serbia
20:00 (CET)	Scoring by quarter: 26–12, 17–20, 19–24, 32–18
	Pts: Miller 22; Rebs: Štimac 13; Asts: Micić 9 PIR: Miller 27	Boxscore	Pts: Pullen 20; Rebs: Walker, White 7 Asts: Bilan 5 PIR: White 24	Arena: Pionir; Attendance: 6,491; Referees: Christos Christodoulou (GRE), Eddie Viator (FRA), Carlos Peruga (ESP)

26 February 2016 8	Crvena zvezda Telekom (Serbia)	91–82	(Turkey) Anadolu Efes	Vršac, Serbia
20:00 (CET)	Scoring by quarter: 24–19, 14–27, 25–19, 28–17
	Pts: Miller 15; Rebs: Zirbes 9 Asts: Gudurić 5 PIR: Zirbes 23	Boxscore	Pts: Šarić 19; Rebs: Šarić 8 Asts: Heurtel 11; PIR: Šarić 27	Arena: Millennium Center; Attendance: 4,961; Referees: Emilio Pérez Pizarro (ESP), Elias Koromilas (GRE), Tomas Jasevičius (LTU)

4 March 2016 9	Fenerbahçe (Turkey)	72–65	(Serbia) Crvena zvezda Telekom	Istanbul, Turkey
19:30 (CET)	Scoring by quarter: 14–18, 11–16, 24–6, 23–25
	Pts: Datome 27; Rebs: Bogdanović 7 Asts: Dixon 6 PIR: Datome 29	Boxscore	Pts: Zirbes 11; Rebs: Zirbes 7 Asts: Micić 4 PIR: Simonović 14	Arena: Ülker Sports Arena; Attendance: 10,694; Referees: Miguel Ángel Pérez Pérez (ESP), Spiros Gkontas (GRE), Marcin Kowalski (POL)

11 March 2016 10	Crvena zvezda Telekom (Serbia)	69–67	(Greece) Panathinaikos	Belgrade, Serbia
20:00 (CET)	Scoring by quarter: 10–18, 18–13, 25–11, 16–25
	Pts: Kinsey 19; Rebs: three players 5 Asts: Jović 6 PIR: Miller 27	Boxscore	Pts: Williams 17; Rebs: Raduljica 7 Asts: Diamantidis 3 PIR: Raduljica, Williams 16	Arena: Kombank Arena; Attendance: 18,150; Referees: Borys Ryzhyk (UKR), Robert Lottermoser (GER), Antonio Conde (ESP)

18 March 2016 11	Unicaja (Spain)	72–78	(Serbia) Crvena zvezda Telekom	Málaga, Spain
20:45 (CET)	Scoring by quarter: 20–12, 23–15, 17–26, 12–25
	Pts: Nedović 22; Rebs: three players 6 Asts: Jackson 4 PIR: three players 16	Boxscore	Pts: Jović 16; Rebs: Miller, Zirbes 7 Asts: Micić 8 PIR: Jović 24	Arena: Martín Carpena; Attendance: 5,856; Referees: Oļegs Latiševs (LAT), Tolga Sahin (ITA), Ersan Kartal (TUR)

24 March 2016 12	Lokomotiv Kuban (Russia)	86–62	(Serbia) Crvena zvezda Telekom	Krasnodar, Russia
18:00 (CET)	Scoring by quarter: 19–15, 26–20, 21–14, 20–13
	Pts: Randolph, Singleton 17; Rebs: Delaney 4 Asts: Delaney 9 PIR: Delaney 25	Boxscore	Pts: Gudurić 13; Rebs: Zirbes 8 Asts: Gudurić 4 PIR: Štimac 17	Arena: Basket Hall; Attendance: 6,442; Referees: Juan Carlos García González (ESP), Carmelo Paternico (ITA), Aare Halliko (EST)

31 March 2016 13	Crvena zvezda Telekom (Serbia)	61–80	(Turkey) Darüşşafaka Doğuş	Belgrade, Serbia
20:00 (CEST)	Scoring by quarter: 20–15, 14–20, 15–20, 12–25
	Pts: Miller 18; Rebs: Miller 7 Asts: Gudurić 4 PIR: Miller 16	Boxscore	Pts: Wilbekin 19; Rebs: Bjelica, Slaughter 6 Asts: Gordon 6 PIR: Gordon 27	Arena: Kombank Arena; Attendance: 18,078; Referees: Fernando Rocha (POR), Spiros Gkontas (GRE), Joseph Bissang (FRA)

8 April 2016 14	Cedevita (Croatia)	83–62	(Serbia) Crvena zvezda Telekom	Zagreb, Croatia
19:00 (CEST)	Scoring by quarter: 29–12, 23–19, 16–14, 15–17
	Pts: Pullen 22; Rebs: Bilan 6 Asts: Gordić, White 3 PIR: Pullen 29	Boxscore	Pts: Štimac 18; Rebs: Štimac 11; Asts: Micić 5 PIR: Štimac 28	Arena: Dražen Petrović Zagreb; Attendance: 1,497; Referees: Miguel Ángel Pérez Pérez (ESP), Robert Lottermoser (GER), Seffi Shemmesh (ISR)

==== Playoffs ====
12 April 2016 1	CSKA Moscow (Russia)	84–74 (Series: 1–0)	(Serbia) Crvena zvezda Telekom	Moscow, Russia
19:00 (CEST)	Scoring by quarter: 25–20, 19–20, 19–16, 21–18
	Pts: Teodosić 23; Rebs: Vorontsevich 7 Asts: De Colo 10; PIR: Teodosić 28	Boxscore	Pts: Jović, Miller 14; Rebs: Zirbes 6 Asts: Jović 4 PIR: Miller 13	Arena: Megasport Arena; Attendance: 6,702; Referees: Daniel Hierrezuelo (ESP), Saša Pukl (SLO), Amit Balak (ISR)

14 April 2016 2	CSKA Moscow (Russia)	77–76 (Series: 2–0)	(Serbia) Crvena zvezda Telekom	Moscow, Russia
19:00 (CEST)	Scoring by quarter: 20–20, 24–28, 19–12, 14–16
	Pts: Hines 19; Rebs: four players 4 Asts: De Colo, Jackson 3 PIR: Hines 25	Boxscore	Pts: Jović 15; Rebs: four players 5 Asts: Jović 7 PIR: Miller 18	Arena: Megasport Arena; Attendance: 8,107; Referees: Juan Carlos García González (ESP), Elias Koromilas (GRE), Sašo Petek (SLO)

18 April 2016 3	Crvena zvezda Telekom (Serbia)	71–78 (Series: 0–3)	(Russia) CSKA Moscow	Belgrade, Serbia
20:45 (CEST)	Scoring by quarter: 21–18, 14–18, 12–23, 24–19
	Pts: Miller 15; Rebs: Jović 6 Asts: Jović 6 PIR: Miller 16	Boxscore	Pts: De Colo 20; Rebs: Higgins 9 Asts: Teodosić 7 PIR: De Colo 19	Arena: Kombank Arena; Attendance: 18,027; Referees: Miguel Ángel Pérez Pérez (ESP), Carmelo Paternico (ITA), Petri Mäntylä (FIN)

=== Serbian Super League ===
==== League table ====
Pos	Team	Pld	W	L	PF	PA	PD	Pts	Qualification or relegation
1	Crvena zvezda	6	6	0	531	384	+147	12	Qualification to playoffs
2	FMP	6	4	2	484	439	+45	10	Qualification to playoffs
3	Metalac	6	2	4	475	508	−33	8	
4	Tamiš	6	0	6	381	540	−159	6	

Source: Srbijasport.net

==== Results by round ====
Round	1	2	3	4	5	6
Ground	H	H	A	A	A	H
Result	W	W	W	W	W	W
Position	1	1	1	1	1	1

Source: Competitive matches
Ground: A = Away; H = Home; R = Rest. Result: L = Loss; W = Win; R = Rest; P = Postponed.

Win Loss

==== Matches ====
8 May 2016 1	Crvena zvezda	94–54	Tamiš	Belgrade
	Scoring by quarter: 18–9, 29–20, 17–15, 30–10
	Pts: Simonović 15; Rebs: Zirbes 5 Asts: Rebić 10; PIR: Simonović 19	Boxscore	Pts: Vujović 11; Rebs: Vujović 5 Asts: Milošević 5 PIR: Vujović 14	Arena: Pionir Hall

12 May 2016 2	Crvena zvezda	102–67	Metalac	Belgrade
		Boxscore		Arena: Pionir Hall

15 May 2016 3	FMP	83–91	Crvena zvezda	Belgrade
		Boxscore		Arena: Železnik Hall

18 May 2016 4	Tamiš	57–94	Crvena zvezda	Pančevo
		Boxscore		Arena: Strelište Sports Hall

22 May 2016 5	Metalac	56–78	Crvena zvezda	Valjevo
		Boxscore		Arena: Valjevo Sports Hall

24 May 2016 6	Crvena zvezda	72–67	FMP	Belgrade
		Boxscore		Arena: Pionir Hall

==== Playoffs ====
27 May 2016 Semifinals 1	Crvena zvezda	77–66 (Series: 1–0)	Mega Leks	Belgrade
19:00	Scoring by quarter: 21–18, 22–12, 13–12, 21–24
	Pts: Simonović 14; Rebs: Zirbes 8 Asts: Jović 8	Boxscore	Pts: Zagorac 20; Rebs: Zagorac 11; Asts: Ivanović 5	Arena: Pionir Hall; Attendance: 2,479; Referees: Belošević, Glišić, Jevtović

29 May 2016 Semifinals 2	Mega Leks	64–74 (Series: 0–2)	Crvena zvezda	Sremska Mitrovica
20:00	Scoring by quarter: 13–14, 25–23, 17–18, 9–19
	Pts: Janković 23; Rebs: Nikolić 7 Asts: Rašić 7	Boxscore	Pts: Mitrović 20; Rebs: Štimac 13; Asts: Jović 9	Attendance: 1,500; Referees: Jovčić, Nešković, Obrknežević

3 June 2016 Finals 1	Crvena zvezda	84–53 (Series: 1–0)	Partizan	Belgrade
21:00	Scoring by quarter: 21–15, 21–12, 22–12, 20–14
	Pts: Miller 24; Rebs: Mitrović 7 Asts: Micić 4	Boxscore	Pts: Williams 10; Rebs: Williams 5 Asts: three players 2	Arena: Pionir Hall; Attendance: 5,029; Referees: Belošević, Jovčić, Glišić

5 June 2016 Finals 2	Partizan	86–87 (Series: 0–2)	Crvena zvezda	Belgrade
21:00	Scoring by quarter: 25–21, 29–16, 18–25, 14–25
	Pts: Wilson 18; Rebs: Andrew Jones 7 Asts: Wilson 5	Boxscore	Pts: three players 13; Rebs: Mitrović 6 Asts: Jović 7	Arena: Pionir Hall; Attendance: 6,500; Referees: Belošević, Vojinović, Nikolić

7 June 2016 Finals 3	Crvena zvezda	72–75 (Series: 2–1)	Partizan	Belgrade
21:00	Scoring by quarter: 13–5, 16–22, 18–26, 25–22
	Pts: Zirbes 19; Rebs: Zirbes 11; Asts: Jović 14	Boxscore	Pts: Andrew Jones, Veličković 13; Rebs: Murić 7 Asts: Veličković, Wilson 4	Arena: Pionir Hall; Attendance: 5,500; Referees: Jovčić, Nešković, Obrknežević

9 June 2016 Finals 4	Partizan	65–70 (Series: 1–3)	Crvena zvezda	Belgrade
21:00	Scoring by quarter: 22–18, 17–23, 9–15, 17–14
	Pts: Veličković 19; Rebs: Veličković 6 Asts: three players 2	Boxscore	Pts: three players 15; Rebs: Zirbes 7 Asts: Jović 4	Arena: Pionir Hall; Attendance: 6,500; Referees: Belošević, Vojinović, Maričić

=== Radivoj Korać Cup ===
Win Loss

19 February 2016 Quarterfinals	Crvena zvezda	89–44	Smederevo 1953	Niš
21:00	Scoring by quarter: 30–12, 17–12, 14–11, 28–9
	Pts: Rebić 15; Rebs: Štimac 10; Asts: Rebić, Gudurić 4 PIR: Rebić 19	Boxscore	Pts: S. Đorđević 13; Rebs: Vasilić 14; Asts: J. Antić 3 PIR: Vasilić 25	Arena: Čair Sports Center; Attendance: 3,300; Referees: Jevtović, Ninković, Milovanović

20 February 2016 Semifinals	Partizan	68–60	Crvena zvezda	Niš
21:00	Scoring by quarter: 17–13, 16–12, 19–14, 16–21
	Pts: Jones 19; Rebs: Jones 8 Asts: Cvetković 3 PIR: Jones 15	Boxscore	Pts: Kinsey 22; Rebs: Zirbes 12; Asts: Micić 5 PIR: Zirbes, Micić 15	Arena: Čair Sports Center; Attendance: 4,000; Referees: Belošević, Jovčić, Vojinović

== Individual awards ==
=== EuroLeague ===
MVP of the Week

Round	Player	Efficiency	Ref.
RS8	(Germany) Maik Zirbes	33	

All-Euroleague Second Team

Position	Player	Ref.
SF	(United States) Quincy Miller	

=== Adriatic League ===
MVP of the Round

Round	Player	Efficiency	Ref.
22	(Germany) Maik Zirbes	36	
24	(Germany) Maik Zirbes	34	
F1	(Germany) Maik Zirbes	29	
F2	(Serbia) Stefan Jović	20	
F3	(United States) Quincy Miller	19	

MVP of the Month

Month	Player	Ref.
February 2016	(Germany) Maik Zirbes	

Ideal Starting Five

Position	Player	Ref.
C	(Germany) Maik Zirbes	

=== Serbian League ===
Playoff MVP

- (Germany) Maik Zirbes

== Statistics ==
Legend
GP	Games played	GS	Games started	MPG	Minutes per game
FG%	Field-goal percentage	3FG%	3-point field-goal percentage	FT%	Free-throw percentage
RPG	Rebounds per game	APG	Assists per game	SPG	Steals per game
BPG	Blocks per game	PPG	Points per game	PIR	PIR per game

*	Led the league
Player	Left during season

=== EuroLeague ===
Player	GP	GS	MPG	2FG%	3FG%	FT%	RPG	APG	SPG	BPG	PPG	PIR
Nemanja Dangubić	19	15	15.5	.632	.452	.692	1.9	.8	.3	.1	5.2	3.4
Marko Gudurić	24	1	15.4	.474	.371	.810	1.5	1.4	.6	.0	7.1	5.8
Stefan Jović	27	22	23.1	.435	.356	.788	3.0	5.7	1.2	.1	7.0	9.7
Tarence Kinsey	16	15	23.3	.495	.129	.878	2.2	1.9	1.1	.2	9.6	8.1
Branko Lazić	26	11	19.3	.447	.410	.875	1.3	1.0	.9	.0	4.3	2.9
Vasilije Micić	17	1	17.3	.327	.361	.724	1.8	3.6	.2	.2	5.5	5.0
Quincy Miller	24	22	29.0	.596	.327	.778	5.7	.9	.9	1.5	14.1	14.8
Luka Mitrović	4	1	10.4	.417	1.000	.500	2.5	.3	.0	.5	4.5	4.0
Stefan Nastić	2	1	4.2	.286	.000	.000	1.5	.0	.0	.0	2.0	.0
Nikola Rebić	15	0	7.6	.462	.227	.375	1.1	.9	.3	.1	2.0	1.4
Boriša Simanić	7	0	7.3	1.000	.286	1.000	1.0	.0	.1	.3	2.0	2.3
Marko Simonović	27	6	19.5	.545	.421	.783	1.9	.3	.5	.1	7.4	5.9
Vladimir Štimac	25	0	14.3	.550	.000	.594	5.0	.5	.3	.2	6.9	9.2
Maik Zirbes	27	26	25.1	.607	.000	.677	6.1	.7	.9	.6	12.4	14.3
Gal Mekel	4	4	20.2	.217	.333	1.000	1.5	2.8	.3	.3	3.8	0.8
Sofoklis Schortsanitis	2	1	15.2	.500	.000	.500	.5	.0	.0	.5	4.5	-1.5
Marko Tejić	11	3	5.4	.300	.000	.333	1.1	.5	.2	.1	.7	.0
Ryan Thompson	10	6	19.3	.500	.190	.667	1.6	.9	.5	.1	4.8	1.7
Marcus Williams	3	0	15.0	.333	.182	.750	2.0	5.3	.0	.0	5.0	5.0

Source: EuroLeague

== See also ==
- 2015–16 Red Star Belgrade season
- 2015–16 KK Partizan season
