= Baby Shaq =

Baby Shaq may refer to:

- Eddy Curry, an American basketball player
- Nathan Jawai, an Australian basketball player
- Sofoklis Schortsanitis, a Greek basketball player
