= Vasilije Micić =

Serbian basketball player (born 1994)

Vasilije Micić Василије Мицић
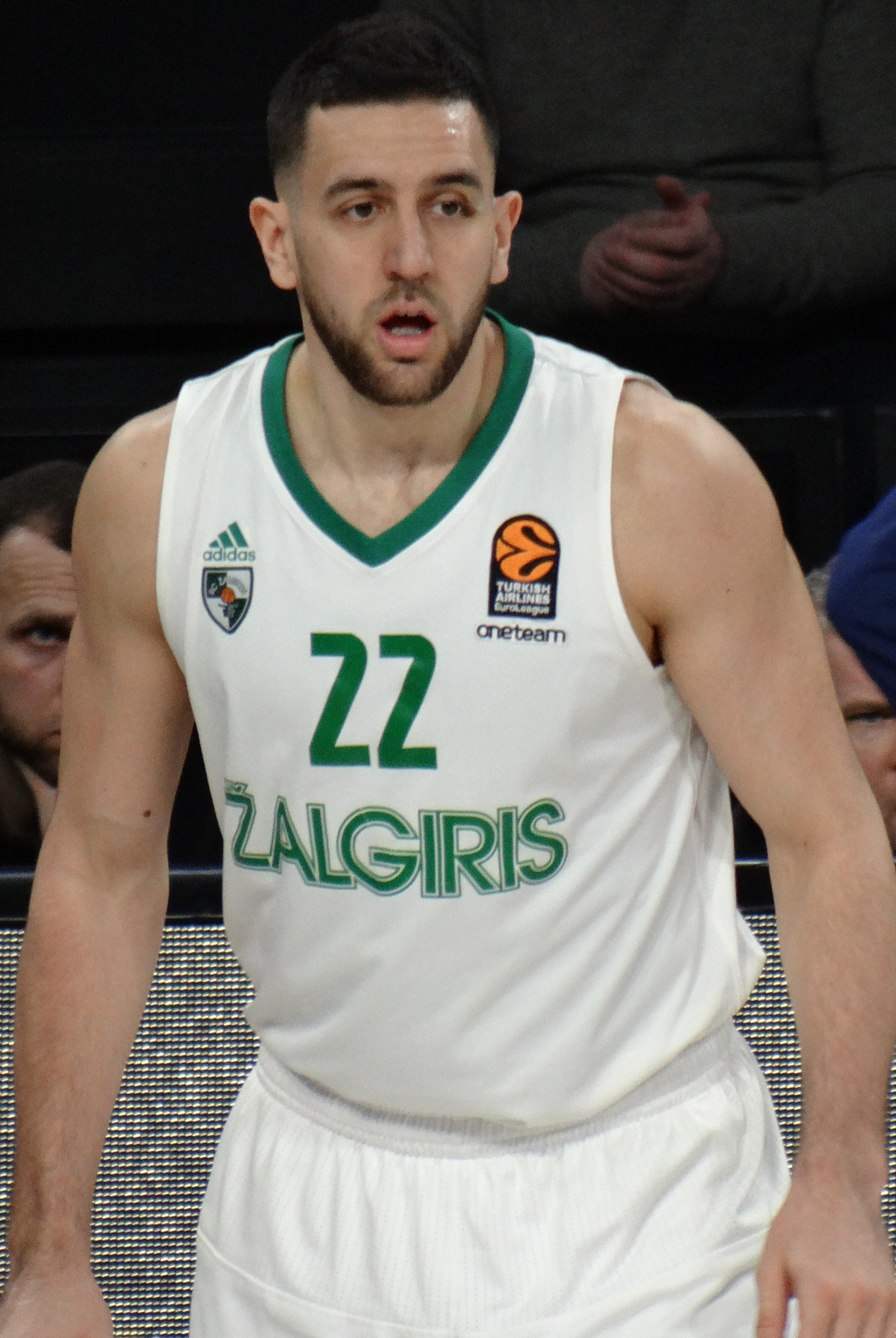
- Micić with Žalgiris Kaunas

No. 22 – Hapoel Tel Aviv
- Position: Point guard
- League: Israeli Basketball Premier League; EuroLeague

Personal information
- Born: 13 January 1994 (age 32) Kraljevo, Serbia, FR Yugoslavia
- Listed height: 6 ft 5 in (1.96 m)
- Listed weight: 188 lb (85 kg)

Career information
- NBA draft: 2014: 2nd round, 52nd overall pick
- Drafted by: Philadelphia 76ers
- Playing career: 2010–present

Career history
- 2010–2014: Mega Vizura
- 2014–2016: Bayern Munich
- 2015–2016: →Crvena zvezda
- 2016–2017: Tofaş
- 2017–2018: Žalgiris Kaunas
- 2018–2023: Anadolu Efes
- 2023–2024: Oklahoma City Thunder
- 2024–2025: Charlotte Hornets
- 2025: Phoenix Suns
- 2025–present: Hapoel Tel Aviv

Career highlights
- EuroLeague 25th Anniversary Team (2025); 2× EuroLeague champion (2021, 2022); Alphonso Ford EuroLeague Top Scorer Trophy (2022); EuroLeague MVP (2021); 2× EuroLeague Final Four MVP (2021, 2022); All-EuroLeague First Team (2021); 2× All-EuroLeague Second Team (2019, 2022); 3× Turkish Super League champion (2019, 2021, 2023); Turkish Cup winner (2022); 3× Turkish Super Cup winner (2018, 2019, 2022); Turkish Super League Finals MVP (2023); Turkish Super League assists leader (2019); 2× Turkish Super League All-Star (2017, 2019); King Mindaugas Cup winner (2018); LKL champion (2018); ABA League champion (2016); Serbian League champion (2016); Serbian Cup MVP (2014)
- Stats at NBA.com
- Stats at Basketball Reference
Medals
Men's basketball
Representing Serbia
Olympic Games
Bronze medal – third place	2024 Paris	Team
EuroBasket
Silver medal – second place	2017 Finland–Israel–Romania–Turkey	Team
U19 World Cup
Silver medal – second place	2013 Czech Republic	Team
U18 European Championship
Silver medal – second place	2011 Poland	Team

Vasilije "Vasa" Micić (Serbian Cyrillic: Василије "Васа" Мицић, born 13 January 1994) is a Serbian professional basketball player for Hapoel Tel Aviv of the Israeli Basketball Premier League and the EuroLeague. He also represents the Serbian national team in international competition.

He was selected by the Philadelphia 76ers with the 52nd overall pick in the 2014 NBA draft, and has played in the NBA for the Oklahoma City Thunder, Charlotte Hornets, and Phoenix Suns. A three-time All-EuroLeague selection, Micić led Anadolu Efes to two EuroLeague titles, in 2021 and 2022, while winning the EuroLeague MVP in 2021 as well as both Final Four MVPs.

== Early life ==
Micić was born on January 13, 1994, in Kraljevo, Serbia. He attended Jovan Cvijić Elementary School in Karaburma, Serbia.

== Junior career ==
From 2002 to 2006, Micić played for the OKK Beograd youth system. In 2006–07, he played for Crvena zvezda juniors, and then from 2007 to 2010, he played for FMP Železnik juniors.

== Professional career ==
=== Mega Vizura (2010–2014) ===
In 2010, Micić signed with Mega Vizura in Belgrade, Serbia. At the age of 16, he made his Basketball League of Serbia debut, going on to play 35 games in 2010–11. In his first season with the club, he appeared in 35 games of the Serbian League and averaged 8.5 points, 3.1 rebounds, and 2.8 assists per game. On 22 November 2011, just 8 games into the 2011–12 season, Micić suffered a season-ending knee injury involving a ligament tear. Over 8 games, he averaged 15.9 points, 5.0 assists, 2.5 steals, and 3.5 rebounds per game.

In the 2012–13 season, he became a leader of the team with Boban Marjanović. The team was promoted to the Adriatic League for the first time in the club's history at the end of the season. Over 41 games in the Serbian League, he averaged 11.8 points, 5.0 assists, and 1.0 steals per game.

On 6 June 2013, Micić signed a two-year contract extension with Mega Vizura. On 8 April 2014, he broke his hand which sidelined him off the court for one month. In his first ABA League season, he averaged 12.1 points, 3.2 rebounds, and 5.8 assists over 25 games.

=== Bayern Munich and loan to Crvena Zvezda (2014–2016) ===
On 4 August 2014, Micić signed a two-year deal with an option for one more season with the German team Bayern Munich. On 28 November 2014, in a EuroLeague game against Panathinaikos, he partially ruptured a collateral ligament in his right elbow and was expected to miss six weeks of play. He appeared in 32 games of the German League averaging 7 points and 3.3 assists per game. He also made a debut in the 2014–15 Euroleague, but appeared in only 6 games and averaging 7.5 points per game.

With the start of 2015–16 season, his playing time further decreased in Bayern. In mid-season, on 27 December 2015, Micić was loaned to the Serbian team Crvena zvezda for the rest of the 2015–16 season. He appeared in 17 games of the 2015–16 Euroleague for Crvena zvezda, averaging 5.5 points and 3.6 assists per game. When the loan was ended, Micić was released by Bayern on 25 July 2016.

=== Tofaş (2016–2017) ===
On 26 July 2016, Micić signed with the Turkish BSL club Tofaş for the 2016–17 Basketbol Süper Ligi season. In 24 games with Tofaş, Micić averaged 13.2 points, 3.9 assists, 2.7 rebounds, and 1.4 steals while shooting 46% from the field and 83% from the free throw line.

=== Žalgiris Kaunas (2017–2018) ===
On 15 June 2017, Micić signed a two-year contract with the Lithuanian club Žalgiris Kaunas. Žalgiris Kaunas had a historic season in which it won yet another Lithuanian League championship and qualified for the EuroLeague Final Four tournament. In 2018 EuroLeague Final Four, it lost to Fenerbahçe Basketball in the semifinal, and won in the third-place game against the CSKA Moscow. Over 36 games in the 2017–18 EuroLeague season, Micić averaged 7.7 points, 4.2 assists, and 2.2 rebounds per game. After the season, Micić along with his teammate Kevin Pangos parted ways with the team.

=== Anadolu Efes (2018–2023) ===
On 20 June 2018, Micić signed a two-year contract with Turkish club Anadolu Efes. In the 2018–19 season, Micić led the team to the 2019 EuroLeague Final Four, where they lost in the final game to CSKA Moscow. Over 37 games in the 2018–19 EuroLeague season, he averaged career-highs of 12.1 points, 5.5 assists, and 2.2 rebounds per game.

On 25 May 2019, Micić signed a two-year contract extension with Anadolu Efes. On 10 August 2020, his agent confirmed that he was returning to the team for the 2020–21 season, rather than trying for the NBA.

By the end of his 2020–21 EuroLeague campaign, Micić became the fourth EuroLeague player of all-time to score at least 100 two-pointers, 70 threes, and 100 free throws in a single season. He also became the first player ever to have made more than 132 two-pointers while making at least 70 triples and 100 free throws. Micić was named to the All-EuroLeague First Team, and received the EuroLeague MVP award. As well, Micić and his fellow Serbian countryman Nikola Jokić became the first-ever pair of players from the same country to be awarded both the NBA MVP and the EuroLeague MVP honors in the same season. On 30 May 2021, he led his team to their first Euroleague Championship, and was named the EuroLeague Final Four MVP. Over 40 EuroLeague games, he averaged a then-career-high 16.7 points per game.

Over 34 games of the 2021–22 EuroLeague season, Micić averaged a season-leading and career-high 18.2 points (for which he received the Alphonso Ford EuroLeague Top Scorer Trophy), 4.6 assists, and 2.7 rebounds per game. Micić won back-to-back EuroLeague titles with Anadolu Efes, after scoring the winning three-pointer in the 2022 EuroLeague Final Four semifinal game against Olympiacos, and later scoring 23 points in the final game against Real Madrid. He was once again named the EuroLeague Final Four MVP.

=== Oklahoma City Thunder (2023–2024) ===
In June 2014, alongside his teammates Nemanja Dangubić and Nikola Jokić, Micić attended the Eurocamp, a basketball camp based in Treviso, Italy, for the NBA draft prospects. He impressed scouts, with 14 points and 10 assists in 25 minutes of the game.

In March 2014, Micić confirmed that he would enter the 2014 NBA draft. On 26 June 2014, Micić was selected by the Philadelphia 76ers with the 52nd overall pick in the 2014 NBA draft. On 8 December 2020, the 76ers traded Micić's draft rights to the Oklahoma City Thunder alongside Al Horford and the rights to Théo Maledon, for Danny Green, Vincent Poirier,and Terrance Ferguson.

On 17 July 2023, Micić signed a contract with the Thunder. In 30 games with the Thunder, Micić had a limited role and averaged 12,0 minutes, 3.3 points, and 2.5 assists per game.

=== Charlotte Hornets (2024–2025) ===
On 8 February 2024, Micić was traded to the Charlotte Hornets, along with Dāvis Bertāns, Tre Mann, a 2024 second-round pick, a 2025 second-round pick, and cash considerations, in exchange for Gordon Hayward. On 10 February, Micić made his Hornets debut, putting up 18 points and delivering nine assists in a 115–106 win over the Memphis Grizzlies. Over 30 regular season games for the Hornets, Micić averaged 27.2 minutes, 10.8 points, 6.2 assists, 2.1 rebounds, and 0.7 steals while shooting 43.7% shooting from the field and 83.9% from the free throw line.

He played basketball for Serbia in the 2024 Olympic Games, in which the team won a bronze medal. In six games he averaged 13.3 points and 4.5 assists per game.

=== Phoenix Suns (2025) ===
On 6 February 2025, Micić, Cody Martin, and a 2026 second-round pick were traded to the Phoenix Suns in exchange for center Jusuf Nurkić and a 2026 first-round pick. For Phoenix, in five games he averaged 4.1 minutes per game, without taking any shots.

On 30 June 2025, Micić, a 2029 first-round pick, and the draft rights to Liam McNeeley were traded to the Charlotte Hornets in exchange for center Mark Williams and a 2029 second-round pick. Six days later, on July 6, 2025, Micić was traded again to the Milwaukee Bucks in exchange for Pat Connaughton and two second-round picks. A day later, Micić agreed to a contract buyout with the Bucks.

=== Hapoel Tel Aviv (2025–present) ===
On July 16, 2025, Micić signed a three-year deal with Hapoel Tel Aviv of the Israeli Basketball Premier League. In 2025–26 with Hapoel Tel Aviv, in 59 games he averaged 24.5 minutes, 12.3 points, 2.7 rebounds, 4.7 assists, and 1.0 steals per game, while shooting .864 from the free throw line.

== National team career ==
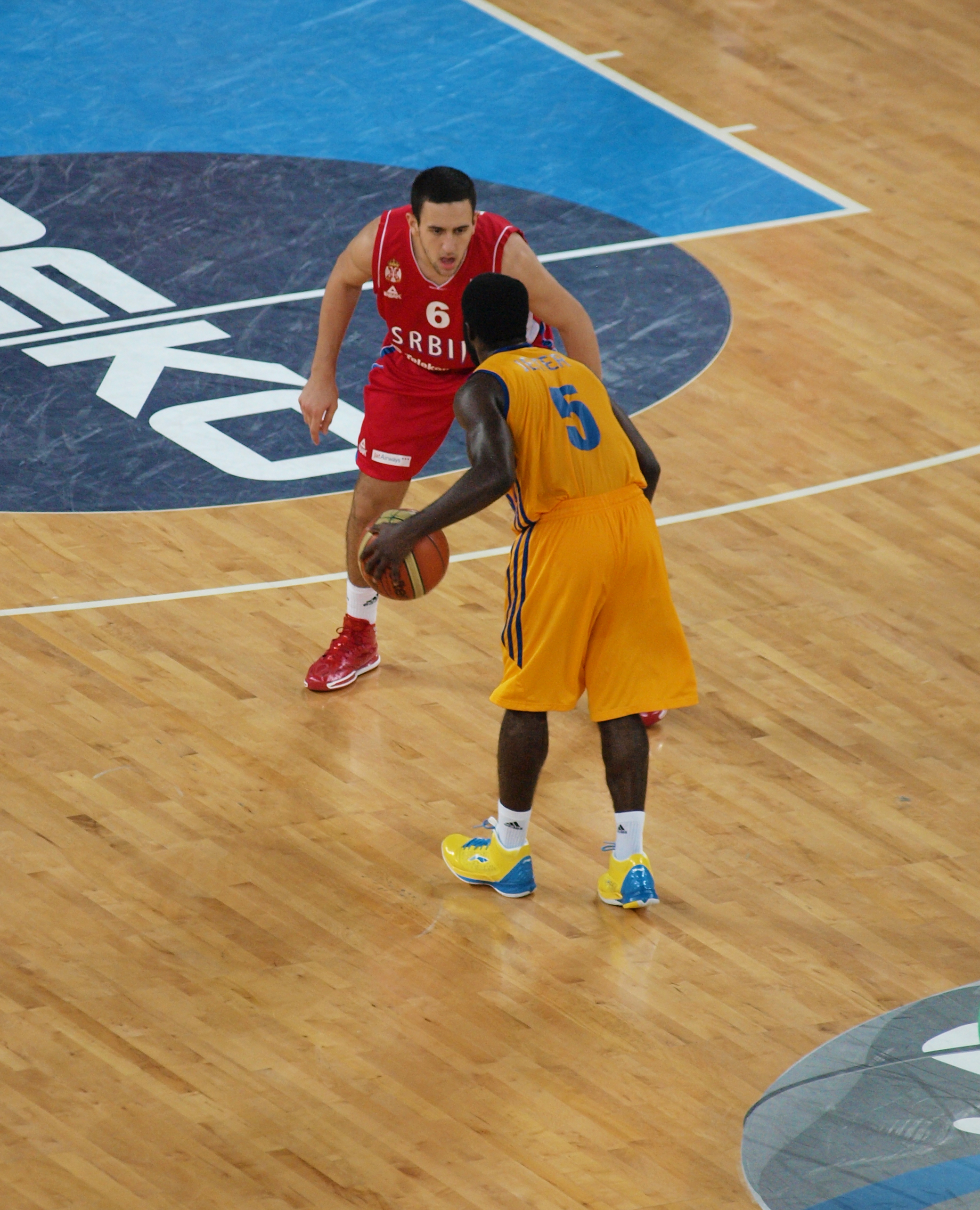
Eugene "Pooh" Jeter versus Micić as Ukraine plays Serbia in Eurobasket 2013.

In 2011, Micić won a silver medal with the Serbian U18 team at the 2011 FIBA Europe Under-18 Championship. In 2013, he again won a silver medal with the Serbian U19 team at the 2013 FIBA Under-19 World Cup, where he was to the All-Tournament Team. In the same year, he debuted for the senior Serbian national team at the EuroBasket 2013 in Slovenia, where he averaged 4.4 points, 1.5 rebounds, and 1.3 assists per game.

Micić also represented Serbia at the EuroBasket 2017, where they won the silver medal, after losing in the final game to Slovenia.

At the 2019 FIBA Basketball World Cup, the national team of Serbia was dubbed as favorite to win the trophy, but was eventually upset in the quarterfinals by Argentina. With wins over the United States and Czech Republic, it finished in fifth place. Micić averaged 5.6 points, 1.8 rebounds, and 3.1 assists over 8 games. In the 2022 Eurobasket, he averaged 14.8 points, 3.2 rebounds, and 7.5 assists over 6 games.

He won the bronze medal at the 2024 Summer Olympics with Serbia. Over 6 tournament games, Micić averaged 13.3 points, 4.5 assists, and 2.3 rebounds.

== Personal life ==
Micić's sister, Nina, is a professional Olympic snowboarder. She competed at the 2014 Winter Olympics.

== Career statistics ==
Legend
GP	Games played	GS	Games started	MPG	Minutes per game
FG%	Field-goal percentage	3P%	3-point field-goal percentage	FT%	Free-throw percentage
RPG	Rebounds per game	APG	Assists per game	SPG	Steals per game
BPG	Blocks per game	PPG	Points per game	PIR	Performance index rating
**Bold**	Career high

=== NBA ===
Year	Team	GP	GS	MPG	FG%	3P%	FT%	RPG	APG	SPG	BPG	PPG
2023–24	Oklahoma City	30	0	12.0	.407	.244	.737	.8	2.5	.3	**.1**	3.3
2023–24	Charlotte	30	**21**	**27.2**	**.437**	.294	**.839**	2.1	**6.2**	**.7**	**.1**	**10.8**
2024–25	Charlotte	**36**	16	21.2	.348	**.360**	.829	**2.4**	3.5	.4	.0	7.5
2024–25	Phoenix	5	0	4.2	.0	.0	.0	.4	.2	.0	.0	.0
Career		101	37	19.4	.395	.315	.819	1.8	3.9	.5	.1	6.8

=== EuroLeague ===
†	Denotes season in which Micic won the EuroLeague
*	Led the league

Year	Team	GP	GS	MPG	FG%	3P%	FT%	RPG	APG	SPG	BPG	PPG	PIR
2014–15	Bayern	6	1	18.0	.450	.200	.875	1.5	3.2	.5	—	7.5	6.8
2015–16	Bayern	4	0	6.2	.000	.000	**1.000**	.8	.8	.5	**.3**	.5	-1.0
2015–16	Crvena zvezda	17	1	17.4	.341	.361	.724	1.8	3.6	.2	.2	5.5	5.0
2017–18	Žalgiris	36*	10	22.4	.432	.355	.707	2.2	4.2	.9	.0	7.7	8.6
2018–19	Anadolu Efes	37*	30	28.2	.474	.371	.819	2.2	5.5	1.0	.1	12.4	13.9
2019–20	Anadolu Efes	24	22	30.6	.467	**.397**	.964	2.5	**5.8**	**1.3**	.0	14.5	16.0
2020–21†	Anadolu Efes	**40**	34	29.6	**.489**	.389	.865	2.6	4.9	1.2	.0	16.7	**17.5**
2021–22†	Anadolu Efes	34	26	30.2	.461	.339	.854	2.7	4.6	1.1	.0	**18.2***	**17.5**
2022–23	Anadolu Efes	31	29	**31.3**	.435	.357	.869	**3.2**	5.4	.9	.1	16.0	17.4
2025–26	Hapoel Tel Aviv	40	**38**	24.0	.414	.309	.895	2.8	4.2	.9	.0	11.5	11.2
Career		269	193	26.4	.450	.355	.849	2.5	4.7	1.0	.1	12.9	13.4

=== Domestic leagues ===
Year	Team	League	GP	MPG	FG%	3P%	FT%	RPG	APG	SPG	BPG	PPG
2011–12	(Serbia) Mega	KLS	8	33.8	.506	.478	.750	3.5	5.0	2.5	.1	15.9
2012–13	(Serbia) Mega	KLS	41	28.0	.442	.384	.667	3.6	5.0	1.0	.0	11.8
2013–14	(Serbia) Mega	KLS	7	29.1	.493	.381	.938	2.9	5.3	1.1	.0	13.3
2013–14	(Serbia) Mega	ABA	26	30.1	.460	.289	.698	3.0	5.6	1.7	.0	11.6
2014–15	(Germany) Bayern	BBL	35	16.1	.358	.238	.865	2.0	3.5	.7	.0	7.0
2015–16	(Germany) Bayern	BBL	4	9.9	.500	.000	1.000	2.0	2.2	.0	.0	2.5
2015–16	(Serbia) Crvena zvezda	KLS	12	16.4	.360	.296	.727	1.5	2.6	1.2	.0	5.0
2015–16	(Serbia) Crvena zvezda	ABA	14	15.2	.315	.292	.625	1.5	4.1	.9	.0	4.0
2016–17	(Turkey) Tofaş	TBSL	24	27.5	.460	.389	.830	2.9	3.9	1.4	.1	13.2
2017–18	(Lithuania) Žalgiris	LKL	44	19.7	.467	.330	.827	2.3	3.8	1.2	.0	8.2
2018–19	(Turkey) Anadolu Efes	TBSL	31	27.6	.505	.377	.794	2.6	6.4	.9	.0	13.6
2019–20	(Turkey) Anadolu Efes	TBSL	16	25.7	.372	.258	.813	1.9	6.4	.9	.0	12.3
2020–21	(Turkey) Anadolu Efes	TBSL	30	22.4	.500	.386	.828	1.8	4.2	.7	.0	14.2
2021–22	(Turkey) Anadolu Efes	TBSL	25	28.0	.475	.430	.867	2.6	5.4	.7	.0	17.4
2022–23	(Turkey) Anadolu Efes	TBSL	31	26.7	.514	.452	.907	1.9	4.6	.9	.0	16.3
2025–26	(Israel) Hapoel Tel Aviv	IBPL	16	24.7	.471	.462	.792	2.4	5.6	1.2	.1	14.1

== See also ==
- List of NBA drafted players from Serbia
- Philadelphia 76ers draft history
