= Philadelphia 76ers draft history =

Following is a list of the professional National Basketball Association Draft selections of the Philadelphia 76ers, beginning in 1950.

== Key ==
Naismith Basketball Hall of Famer	First overall NBA draft pick	Selected for an NBA All-Star Game

== Philadelphia 76ers (1964–present) ==
Year	Round	Pick	Player	Nationality	Position	College/High School/Club
2025	1	3	V. J. Edgecombe	United States	SG	Baylor
2025	2	35	Johni Broome	United States	PF	Auburn
2024	1	16	Jared McCain	United States	PG	Duke
2024	2	41	Adem Bona	Turkey	PF/C	UCLA
2022	1	23	David Roddy	United States	SF	Colorado State
2021	1	28	Jaden Springer	United States	SG	Tennessee
2021	2	50	Filip Petrušev	Serbia	C	Mega Basket (Serbia)
2021	2	53	Charles Bassey	Nigeria	C	Western Kentucky
2020	1	21	Tyrese Maxey	United States	PG	University of Kentucky
2020	2	34	Théo Maledon	France	PG	ASVEL Villerbaune (France)
2020	2	36	Tyler Bey	United States	SF	University of Colorado
2020	2	49	Isaiah Joe	United States	SG	University of Arkansas
2020	2	58	Paul Reed	United States	PF	DePaul University
2019	1	24	Ty Jerome	United States	PG	University of Virginia
2019	2	33	Carsen Edwards	United States	PG	Purdue University
2019	2	34	Bruno Fernando	Angola	C	University of Maryland
2019	2	42	Admiral Schofield	United States	SF	University of Tennessee
2019	2	54	Marial Shayok	Canada	SG	Iowa State University
2018	1	10	Mikal Bridges	United States	SF	Villanova University
2018	1	26	Landry Shamet	United States	PG	Wichita State University
2018	2	38	Khyri Thomas	United States	PG	Creighton University
2018	2	56	Ray Spalding	United States	PF	University of Louisville
2018	2	60	Kostas Antetokounmpo	Greece	SF	University of Dayton
2017	1	1	Markelle Fultz	United States	PG	University of Washington
2017	2	36	Jonah Bolden	Australia	PF	KK FMP Beograd (Serbia)
2017	2	39	Jawun Evans	United States	PG	Oklahoma State University–Stillwater
2017	2	46	Sterling Brown	United States	PG	Southern Methodist University
2017	2	50	Mathias Lessort	France	PF/C	Nanterre 92 (France)
2016	1	1	Ben Simmons	Australia	PF	Louisiana State University
2016	1	24	Timothé Luwawu-Cabarrot	France	SG/SF	KK Mega Basket (Serbia)
2016	1	26	Furkan Korkmaz	Turkey	SG	Yeşilyurt Spor Kulübü
2015	1	3	Jahlil Okafor	United States	C	Duke University
2015	2	35	Willy Hernangómez	Spain	C	Baloncesto Sevilla (Spain)
2015	2	37	Richaun Holmes	United States	SF/PF	Bowling Green State University
2015	2	47	Artūras Gudaitis	Lithuania	C	Žalgiris Kaunas (Lithuania)
2015	2	58	J. P. Tokoto	United States	SG/SF	University of North Carolina
2015	2	60	Luka Mitrović	Serbia	PF	Red Star Belgarde (Serbia)
2014	1	3	Joel Embiid	Cameroon	C	University of Kansas
2014	1	10	Elfrid Payton	United States	PG	University of Louisiana–Lafayette
2014	2	32	K. J. McDaniels	United States	SF	Clemson University
2014	2	39	Jerami Grant	United States	SF	Syracuse University
2014	2	47	Russ Smith	United States	PG	University of Louisville
2014	2	52	Vasilije Micić	Serbia	PG	KK Mega Basket (Serbia)
2014	2	54	Nemanja Dangubić	Serbia	PG	KK Mega Basket (Serbia)
2013	1	11	Michael Carter-Williams	United States	PG	Syracuse University
2013	2	35	Glen Rice Jr.	United States	PG	Georgia Institute of Technology
2013	2	42	Pierre Jackson	United States	PG	Baylor University
2012	1	15	Maurice Harkless	United States	SF	St. John's University
2012	2	45	Justin Hamilton	United States	C	LSU
2012	2	54	Tornike Shengelia	Georgia	PF	Spirou Charleroi (Belgium)
2011	1	16	Nikola Vučević	Montenegro	C/PF	USC
2011	2	50	Lavoy Allen	United States	PF	Temple University
2010	1	2	Evan Turner	United States	SF	Ohio State University
2009	1	17	Jrue Holiday	United States	PG	University of California, Los Angeles
2008	1	16	Marreese Speights	United States	PF	University of Florida
2007	1	12	Thaddeus Young	United States	PF	Georgia Institute of Technology
2007	1	21	Daequan Cook	United States	PG	Ohio State University
2007	1	30	Petteri Koponen	Finland		Espoon Honka (Finland)
2007	2	38	Kyrylo Fesenko	Ukraine		Cherkaski Mavpy (Ukraine)
2006	1	13	Thabo Sefolosha	Switzerland	SG	Pallacanestro Biella (Italy)
2005	2	45	Louis Williams	United States	PG	South Gwinnett High School (Snellville, Georgia)
2004	1	9	Andre Iguodala	United States	SG/SF	University of Arizona
2003	2	50	Paccelis Morlende	France		JDA Dijon Basket (France)
2002	1	16	Jiří Welsch	Czech Republic		KK Olimpija (Slovenia)
2002	2	44	Sam Clancy Jr.	United States		University of Southern California
2001	1	26	Samuel Dalembert	Haiti/ Canada	C	Seton Hall University
2001	2	36	Damone Brown			Syracuse University
2001	2	56	Ethan Sherwood			Georgia Institute of Technology
2000	1	20	Speedy Claxton			Hofstra University
2000	2	48	Mark Karcher			Temple University
1999	2	47	Todd MacCulloch	Canada		University of Washington
1998	1	8	Larry Hughes			Saint Louis University
1998	2	37	Casey Shaw			University of Toledo
1997	1	2	Keith Van Horn			University of Utah
1997	2	33	Marko Milič	Slovenia		KK Olimpija (Slovenia)
1997	2	35	Kebu Stewart			California State University, Bakersfield
1997	2	36	James Collins			Florida State University
1996	1	1	Allen Iverson		PG	Georgetown University
1996	2	31	Mark Hendrickson			Washington State University
1996	2	32	Ryan Minor			University of Oklahoma
1996	2	48	Jamie Feick			Michigan State University
1995	1	3	Jerry Stackhouse			University of North Carolina
1994	1	6	Sharone Wright			Clemson University
1994	1	20	B. J. Tyler			University of Texas at Austin
1994	2	33	Derrick Alston			Duquesne University
1993	1	2	Shawn Bradley			Brigham Young University
1993	2	32	Alphonso Ford			Mississippi Valley State University
1992	1	9	Clarence Weatherspoon			University of Southern Mississippi
1991	2	17	Álvaro Teherán	Colombia		University of Houston
1990	2	44	Brian Oliver			Georgia Institute of Technology
1990	2	47	Derek Strong			Xavier University
1989	1	19	Kenny Payne			University of Louisville
1989	2	44	Reggie Cross			University of Hawaii
1989	2	54	Toney Mack			University of Georgia
1988	1	3	Charles Smith			University of Pittsburgh
1988	2	31	Everette Stephens			Purdue University
1988	3	57	Hernán Montenegro	Argentina		Louisiana State University
1987	1	16	Christian Welp	West Germany		University of Washington
1987	2	39	Vincent Askew			University of Memphis
1987	2	43	Andrew Kennedy			University of Virginia
1987	3	57	Hansi Gnad	West Germany		University of Alaska Anchorage
1987	3	62	Eric Riggins			Rutgers University
1987	4	85	Brian Rahilly			University of Tulsa
1987	5	108	Frank Ross			American University
1987	6	131	Tracy Foster			University of Alabama at Birmingham
1987	7	154	Eric Semisch			West Virginia University
1986	2	44	David Wingate			Georgetown University
1986	3	56	Keith Colbert			Virginia Tech
1986	3	67	Ron Rowan			St. John's University
1986	4	90	Wes Stallings			East Tennessee State University
1986	5	113	Kevin Holmes			DePaul University
1986	6	136	Andre McCloud			Seton Hall University
1986	7	159	Dan Palombizio			Ball State University
1985	1	21	Terry Catledge			University of South Alabama
1985	2	33	Greg Stokes			University of Iowa
1985	2	44	Voise Winters			Bradley University
1985	3	67	Steve Black			La Salle University
1985	4	90	Derrick Gervin			University of Texas at San Antonio
1985	5	113	Carl Wright			Southern Methodist University
1985	6	136	Daryl Lloyd			Drake University
1985	7	159	Jaye Andrews			Bucknell University
1984	1	5	Charles Barkley			Auburn University
1984	1	10	Leon Wood			California State University, Fullerton
1984	1	22	Tom Sewell			Lamar University
1984	3	48	James Banks			University of Georgia
1984	3	68	Butch Graves			Yale University
1984	4	91	Earl Harrison			Morehead State University
1984	5	114	Dan Federman			University of Tennessee
1984	6	137	Gary Springer			Iona College
1984	7	160	Rich Congo			Drexel University
1984	8	183	Frank Dobbs			Villanova University
1984	9	205	Michael Mitchell			Drexel University
1984	10	227	Martin Clark			Boston College
1983	1	17	Leo Rautins	Canada		Syracuse University
1983	2	47	Ken Lyons			North Texas State University
1983	3	64	Claude Riley			Texas A&M University
1983	3	70	Dan Ruland			James Madison University
1983	4	74	Kalpatrick Wells			Mississippi State University
1983	4	93	Craig Robinson			Princeton University
1983	5	116	Mike Milligan			Tennessee State University
1983	6	139	Sedale Threatt			West Virginia University Institute of Technology
1983	7	162	Tony Bruin			Syracuse University
1983	8	184	Gordon Austin			American University
1983	9	206	Charles Fisher			James Madison University
1982	1	22	Mark McNamara			University of California
1982	2	36	J. J. Anderson			Bradley University
1982	2	45	Russ Schoene			University of Tennessee at Chattanooga
1982	3	68	Dale Solomon			Virginia Tech
1982	4	91	Bruce Atkins			Duquesne University
1982	5	114	Donald Mason			California State University, Fresno
1982	6	137	Kevin Boyle			University of Iowa
1982	7	160	Keith Hilliard			Missouri State University
1982	8	183	Donald Seals			Jackson State University
1982	9	204	George Melton			Cheyney University of Pennsylvania
1982	10	224	Randy Burkert			Drexel University
1981	1	22	Franklin Edwards			Cleveland State University
1981	2	46	Vernon Smith			Texas A&M University
1981	3	68	Ernest Graham			University of Maryland, College Park
1981	4	92	Rynn Wright			Texas A&M University
1981	5	114	Steve Craig			Brigham Young University
1981	6	138	Michael Thomas			North Park University
1981	7	160	John Crawford			University of Kansas
1981	8	183	Frank Gilroy			St. John's University
1981	9	202	Ron Wister			Temple University
1981	10	223	Pete Mullenberg			University of Delaware
1980	1	8	Andrew Toney			University of Louisiana at Lafayette
1980	1	21	Monti Davis			Tennessee State University
1980	2	44	Clyde Austin			North Carolina State University
1980	3	67	Reggie Gaines			Winston-Salem State University
1980	4	85	Billy Bryant			Western Kentucky University
1980	4	90	Harold Hubbard			Savannah State University
1980	5	113	Jim Swaney			University of Toledo
1980	6	136	Donald Cooper			Saint Augustine's College (North Carolina)
1980	7	159	Richard Smith			Weber State University
1980	8	177	Martin Lemelle			Grambling State University
1980	9	198	Luke Griffin			Saint Joseph's University
1980	10	213	Joe Hand			King's College
1979	1	16	Jim Spanarkel			Duke University
1979	2	36	Clint Richardson			Seattle University
1979	2	37	Bernard Toone			Marquette University
1979	3	58	Earl Cureton			University of Detroit Mercy
1979	4	83	Mike Niles			California State University, Fullerton
1979	5	103	Carl McPipe			University of Nebraska
1979	6	123	Dan Hartshorne			University of Oregon
1979	7	142	Bobby Willis			University of Pennsylvania
1979	8	163	Rick Raivio			University of Portland
1979	9	180	Coby Leavitt			University of Utah
1979	10	198	Keith McCord			University of Alabama at Birmingham
1978	2	36	Maurice Cheeks			West Texas A&M University
1978	2	43	Glenn Hagan			St. Bonaventure University
1978	4	87	Brett Vroman			University of Nevada, Las Vegas
1978	5	109	Mark Haymoore			University of Massachusetts Amherst
1978	6	130	Osborne Lockhart			University of Minnesota
1978	7	151	Anthony Murray			University of Alabama
1978	8	169	Alan Cunningham			Colorado State University
1978	10	201	Dennis James			Widener University
1977	1	20	Glenn Mosley			Seton Hall University
1977	2	25	Wilson Washington			Old Dominion University
1977	2	42	Bob Elliott			University of Arizona
1977	2	43	Herm Harris			University of Arizona
1977	3	64	Arnold Dugger			Oral Roberts University
1977	4	86	Jack Jones			University of Utah
1977	5	108	Teko Wynder			University of Tulsa
1977	6	129	George Gibson			Winston-Salem State University
1977	7	149	Dennin Forest			University of Nebraska Omaha
1977	8	168	John Olive			Villanova University
1976	1	12	Terry Furlow			Michigan State University
1976	3	47	Ron Norwood			DePaul University
1976	4	64	Freeman Blade			Montana State University Billings
1976	5	81	Jeff Browne			Missouri Western State College
1976	6	99	Mike Dunleavy Sr.			University of South Carolina
1976	7	117	Phil Walker			Millersville University of Pennsylvania
1976	8	135	Lee Dixon			Hardin–Simmons University
1976	9	152	Fly Williams			Austin Peay State University
1976	10	168	Ed Stefanski			University of Pennsylvania
1975	1	5	Darryl Dawkins			Maynard Evans High School (Orlando, Florida)
1975	2	23	World B. Free			Guilford College
1975	3	39	Jimmie Baker			University of Hawaii
1975	3	41	Charles Cleveland			University of Alabama
1975	4	59	Louis Dunbar			University of Houston
1975	5	77	Ken Tyler			Gonzaga University
1975	6	95	Ken Alston			Valdosta State University
1975	7	113	Mike Flynn			University of Kentucky
1975	8	131	Freeman Blade			Montana State University Billings
1975	9	148	Larry Harralson			Drake University
1975	10	164	Rick Reed			Azusa Pacific University
1974	1	2	Marvin Barnes			Providence College
1974	2	19	Don Smith			University of Dayton
1974	3	37	Coniel Norman			University of Arizona
1974	3	42	Harvey Catchings			Hardin–Simmons University
1974	4	55	Butch Taylor			Jacksonville University
1974	5	73	Gary Crowthers			Hardin–Simmons University
1974	6	91	Mark Westra			University of Southern California
1974	7	109	Dave Stoczynski			Gannon University
1974	8	127	Jimmy Powell			Middle Tennessee State University
1974	9	145	Perry Warbington			Georgia Southern University
1974	10	162	Larry Witherspoon			Towson University
1973	1	1	Doug Collins			Illinois State University
1973	1	18	Raymond Lewis			California State University, Los Angeles
1973	2	21	Allan Bristow			Virginia Tech
1973	2	22	George McGinnis			Indiana University
1973	2	32	Caldwell Jones			Albany State University
1973	4	53	Darrel Minniefield			University of New Mexico
1973	5	70	Reggie Royals			Florida State University
1973	6	87	Sterling Wright			Lincoln University (Pennsylvania)
1973	7	104	James Greene			Kentucky Wesleyan College
1973	8	121	Dave Langston			Drake University
1973	9	138	Harvey Catchings			Hardin–Simmons University
1973	10	152	Abe Steward			Jacksonville University
1973	11	166	Rod Freeman			Vanderbilt University
1973	12	175	Connie Warren			Xavier University
1973	13	183	Jim Crawford			La Salle University
1973	14	189	Ernie Johnson			University of Michigan
1973	15	194	Lionel Harris			University of Cincinnati
1973	16	199	Larry Robinson			University of Tennessee
1973	17	203	Tony Prince			St. John's University
1972	1	5	Fred Boyd			Oregon State University
1972	3	36	Charlie Tharpe			Belhaven College
1972	4	52	Marshall Wingate			Niagara University
1972	5	69	Joe Bynes			University of Arkansas at Pine Bluff
1972	6	85	John Glover			Wiley College
1972	7	103	Curtis Pritchett			Saint Augustine's College (NC)
1972	8	118	Jim Kopp			Rockhurst University
1972	9	135	Rod Murray			University of California, Los Angeles
1972	10	147	Gary Watson			University of Wisconsin–Madison
1971	1	12	Dana Lewis			University of Tulsa
1971	2	33	Marvin Stewart			University of Nebraska
1971	3	46	Dave Wohl			University of Pennsylvania
1971	4	63	Erwin Johnson			Augusta State University
1971	5	80	Richard Hood			Phillips University
1971	6	97	Jake Jones			Assumption College
1971	7	114	Curtis Ford			Northeastern State University
1971	8	131	Barry Yates			University of Maryland, College Park
1971	9	147	Tom Lee			University of Arizona
1971	10	163	Jim Dinwiddie			University of Kentucky
1971	11	178	Dana Pagett			University of Southern California
1971	12	191	Ken Kowall			Ohio University
1971	13	203	Hank Commodore			Northwestern Oklahoma State University
1970	1	12	Al Henry			University of Wisconsin–Madison
1970	3	46	Dennis Awtrey			Santa Clara University
1970	4	63	Dan Crenshaw			Alabama State University
1970	5	80	Perry Wallace			Vanderbilt University
1970	6	97	Jerry Venable			Kansas State University
1970	7	114	Carlton Poole			Philadelphia University
1970	8	131	Fran O'Hanlon			Villanova University
1970	9	148	Mike Hauer			Saint Joseph's University
1970	10	165	Gordon Stiles			American University
1970	11	180	David Whitley			Tufts University
1969	1	13	Bud Ogden			Santa Clara University
1969	2	28	Willie Taylor			Le Moyne College
1969	3	42	Mike Grosso			University of Louisville
1969	4	56	Dave Scholz			University of Illinois at Urbana–Champaign
1969	5	70	Joe Cromer			Temple University
1969	6	84	John Jones			Villanova University
1969	7	98	Dave Hamilton			West Virginia State University
1969	8	112	Jim Bowles			Trinity University
1969	9	126	Larry Lewis			Saint Francis University
1969	10	140	Bill Justus			University of Tennessee
1969	11	154	Bruce Sloan			University of Kansas
1969	12	167	Roland Taylor			La Salle University
1968	1	14	Shaler Halimon			Utah State University
1968	5	62	Larry Miller			University of North Carolina
1968	6	76	Chuck Williams			University of Colorado
1968	7	90	Bill Jones			Fairfield University
1968	8	104	Melvin Jones			Albany State University
1968	9	118	Clarence Brookins			Temple University
1968	10	132	Greg Cisson			Rider University
1968	11	145	Bill Soens			University of Miami
1968	12	158	Ted Campbell			North Carolina A&T State University
1968	13	170	Earl Seyfert			Kansas State University
1968	14	181	Tom Youngdale			Davidson College
1968	15	189	George Mack			North Carolina A&T State University
1968	16	197	Joe Crews			Villanova University
1968	17	203	Nate Ware			Tennessee State University
1967	1	12	Craig Raymond			Brigham Young University
1967	5	53	James Reid			Winston-Salem State University
1967	6	65	Tim Powers			Creighton University
1967	7	77	Frank Card			South Carolina State University
1967	8	89	Jim Conley			University of Virginia
1967	9	100	Ron Filipek			Tennessee Technological University
1967	10	111	Butch Ervin			Niagara University
1967	11	121	Ted Campbell			North Carolina A&T State University
1967	12	131	Hubie Marshall			La Salle University
1967	13	139	George Mack			North Carolina A&T State University
1967	14	145	Wayne Brabender			University of Minnesota Morris
1967	15	151	Sherman Dillard			University of Tulsa
1967	16	156	Wayne Chapman			Western Kentucky University
1967	17	159	Gary Paulk			Oklahoma State University
1966	1	9	Matt Guokas			Saint Joseph's University
1966	2	19	Bill Melchionni			Villanova University
1966	3	29	Donnie Freeman			University of Illinois at Urbana–Champaign
1966	4	39	Ken Wilburn			Central State University
1966	5	49	Tom Duff			Saint Joseph's University
1966	6	59	Red Robbins			University of Tennessee
1966	9	83	Pat Caldwell			Rockhurst University
1966	10	90	Bob Bedell			Stanford University
1965	1	5	Billy Cunningham			University of North Carolina
1965	2	13	Jesse Branson			Elon University
1965	3	22	Bob Weiss			Pennsylvania State University
1965	4	31	Hank Finkel			University of Dayton
1965	5	40	Richie Moore			Villanova University
1965	6	49	Mitch Edwards			University of Texas–Pan American
1965	7	57	John Young			Midwestern State University
1965	8	65	Bob Barnek			St. Bonaventure University
1965	9	71	Gene West			Drake University
1965	10	77	Dean Church			University of Louisiana at Lafayette
1965	11	83	Curt Fromal			La Salle University
1965	12	89	Dan Anderson			Augsburg College
1965	13	94	Rich Parks			University of Tulsa
1965	14	98	Jack Morgenthal			University of Houston
1965	15	102	James Pitts			University of Georgia
1965	16	106	Larry Rafferty			Fairfield University
1964	1	4	Lucious Jackson			University of Texas–Pan American
1964	2	11	Ira Harge			University of New Mexico
1964	3	20	Larry Jones			University of Toledo
1964	4	29	Frank Corace			La Salle University
1964	5	38	Lou Skurcenski			Westminster College (Pennsylvania)
1964	6	47	Ricky Kaminsky			Yale University
1964	7	56	Gordon Hatton			University of Dayton
1964	8	65	Bob Pelkington			Xavier University
1964	9	73	Jim Brennan			Clemson University
1964	10	80	Wally Briggs			North Carolina A&T State University
1964	11	87	Thomas Lowry			West Virginia University
1964	12	91	Julius Myers			Morris Brown College

== Syracuse Nationals (1950–1963) ==
Year	Round	Pick	Player	College/High School/Club
1963	1	6	Tom Hoover	Villanova University
1963	2	15	Hershell West	Grambling State University
1963	3	24	Jerry Greenspan	University of Maryland, College Park
1963	4	33	Ray Flynn	Providence College
1963	5	42	Tony Cerkvenik	Arizona State University
1963	6	51	Vince Brewer	Iowa State University
1963	7	60	Bill Brown	Howard Payne University
1962	1	4	Len Chappell	Wake Forest University
1962	2	12	Chet Walker	Bradley University
1962	3	21	Porter Meriwether	Tennessee State University
1962	4	30	Bob McCully	St. Bonaventure University
1962	5	39	John Windsor	Stanford University
1962	6	48	Larry Van Eman	Wichita State University
1962	7	57	Bob Sharpenter	Georgetown University
1962	8	65	Jerry Harkness	Loyola University Chicago
1962	9	74	Vince Brewer	Iowa State University
1961	1	6	Ben Warley	Tennessee State University
1961	2	14	Chris Smith	Virginia Tech
1961	3	28	Chuck Osborne	Western Kentucky University
1961	4	37	Hank Whitney	Iowa State University
1961	5	46	Don Jacobson	University of South Dakota
1961	6	55	Billy Joe Price	New Mexico State University
1961	7	64	Roger Newman	University of Kentucky
1961	8	73	Dave Mills	Seattle University
1961	9	81	Rex Tippitt	Grambling State University
1961	10	88	Pete Chudy	Syracuse University
1961	11	96	Dick Sammons	Le Moyne College
1960	1	5	Lee Shaffer	University of North Carolina
1960	2	13	Wilbur Trosch	Saint Francis University
1960	3	21	Joe Roberts	Ohio State University
1960	4	29	Carl Cole	Eastern Kentucky University
1960	5	37	Jim Mudd	North Texas State University
1960	6	45	Herschell Turner	University of Nebraska
1960	7	53	Bernie Kauffman	University of Kentucky
1960	8	67	Don Lynch	Le Moyne College
1960	9	67	Bernie Findlay	San Diego State University
1959	1	4	Dick Barnett	Tennessee State University
1959	2	11	Bumper Tormohlen	University of Tennessee
1959	3	19	Jon Cincebox	Syracuse University
1959	4	27	Paul Neumann	Stanford University
1959	5	35	Roger Taylor	University of Illinois at Urbana–Champaign
1959	6	43	Bob Dalton	University of California
1959	7	51	Darnell Haney	United States Naval Academy
1958	1	5	Connie Dierking	University of Cincinnati
1958	2	13	Hal Greer	Marshall University
1958	3	21	John Nacincik	University of Maryland, College Park
1958	4	29	Tommy Kearns	University of North Carolina
1958	5	37	Fred Grim	University of Arkansas
1958	6	45	Jack Mimitz	Saint Louis University
1958	7	53	Pete Tillotson	University of Michigan
1958	8	61	Ruel Tucker	Rockhurst University
1957	1	7	George Bon Salle	University of Illinois at Urbana–Champaign
1957	2	15	Jim Morgan	University of Louisville
1957	3	23	Vince Cohen	Syracuse University
1957	4	31	Jerry Mallett	Baylor University
1957	5	39	Frank Nimmo	University of Cincinnati
1957	6	47	Lyndon Lee	Oklahoma City University
1957	7	54	Dick Gaines	Seton Hall University
1957	8	61	Cebe Prince	Marshall University
1957	9	68	Jim Brown	Syracuse University
1957	10	74	Jack Nichols	Colgate University
1957	12	81	Jim Weeks	New York Institute of Technology
1956	1	5	Joe Holup	George Washington University
1956			Forest Able	Western Kentucky University
1956			Willie Bergines	West Virginia University
1956			Milt Graham	Colgate University
1956			Swede Halbrook	Oregon State University
1956			Bob Hopkins	Grambling State University
1956			Paul Judson	University of Illinois at Urbana–Champaign
1956			Dick Julio	University of Massachusetts Dartmouth
1956			Dick Kenyon	Le Moyne College
1956			Jim McLaughlin	Saint Louis University
1956			Jim Ray	University of Toledo
1956			Jess Roh	Idaho State University
1956			Chuck Rolles	Cornell University
1956			Chester Webb	Georgia Southern University
1955	1	5	Ed Conlin	Fordham University
1955	2	14	Don Schlundt	Indiana University
1955	3	21	Jack Sallee	University of Dayton
1955	4	30	Frank Ehmann	Northwestern University
1955	5	37	Mal Duffy	St. Bonaventure University
1955			Cliff Dwyer	North Carolina State University
1955			Ed Galvin	Loyola University New Orleans
1955			Stan Glowaski	Seattle University
1955			Russ Lawler	Stanford University
1955			Marty Satalino	St. John's University
1955			Ron Tomsic	Stanford University
1954	1	6	Red Kerr	University of Illinois at Urbana–Champaign
1954	2	15	Dick Farley	Indiana University
1954	3	24	Jim Tucker	Duquesne University
1954	4	33	Don McLane	Duquesne University
1954	5	42	Paul Pottenburgh	Siena College
1954	6	51	Norman Pott	Wheaton College
1954	7	60	Gus Levett	Franklin & Marshall College
1954	8	69	Mel Besdin	Syracuse University
1954	9	77	Fletcher Johnson	Duquesne University
1954	10	86	Jack Davidson	University of California, Los Angeles
1953	1	6	Jim Neal	Wofford College
1953			Al Bailey	Duquesne University
1953			Garrett Beshear	Murray State University
1953			Glen Dille	University of Tulsa
1953			Joe Hughes	University of Denver
1953			Bill Hull	Utah State University
1953			Bill Jenkins	Le Moyne College
1953			Billy Kenville	St. Bonaventure University
1953			Dick Knostman	Kansas State University
1953			Andy McGowan	Manhattan College
1953			Gerald Nappy	Georgetown University
1953			Warren Shackelford	University of Tulsa
1952	1	7	Bob Lochmueller	University of Louisville
1952			Jim Brasco	New York University
1952			Bud Donnelly	La Salle University
1952			Jim Kennedy	Duquesne University
1952			Ken McBride	University of Maryland Eastern Shore
1952			Harry Moore	West Virginia University
1952			Bob Roche	Syracuse University
1951	1	5	John McConathy	Northwestern State University
1951	2	14	Don Savage	Le Moyne College
1951	3	24	Bato Govedarica	DePaul University
1951	4	34	Paul Horvath	North Carolina State University
1951	5	44	Glen Anderson	Colorado State University
1951	6	54	Bob Wheeler	University of Idaho
1951	7	64	Roy Reardon	St. Francis College
1951	8	74	Tom Jockle	Syracuse University
1951	9	80	Ray Kirkwasser	Ithaca College
1950	1	11	Don Lofgran	University of San Francisco
1950	2		Gerry Calabrese	St. John's University
1950	3		Stan Christie	University of Southern California
1950	4		Paul Merchant	University of Oklahoma
1950	5		Paul Hickey	University of Denver
1950	6		Mack Suprunowicz	University of Michigan
1950	7		Lou Arko	University of Akron
1950	8		Bob Healey	University of Georgia
1950	9		Bob Savage	Syracuse University
1950	10		Glenn Wilkes	Mercer University
