= Milojko Vasilić =

Serbian basketball player

Hopsi Polzela
- Position: Center
- League: Slovenian League

Personal information
- Born: July 8, 1989 (age 37) Užice, SR Serbia, SFR Yugoslavia
- Listed height: 2.07 m (6 ft 9 in)

Career information
- Playing career: 2005–present

Career history
- 2005–2009: Borac Čačak
- 2009–2013: FMP
- 2013–2014: Banska Bystrica
- 2014: Karpoš Sokoli
- 2014: Gradjanski
- 2014–2015: Prievidza
- 2015-–2016: Smederevo
- 2016: AV Ohrid
- 2017–2020: Hopsi Polzela
- 2020–2021: Terme Olimia Podčetrtek

Milojko Vasilić (Serbian Cyrillic: Милојко Василић; born July 8, 1989) is a Serbian professional basketball player for Terme Olimia Podčetrtek of the Slovenian League.
