= Sofoklis Schortsanitis =

Cameroonian-Greek basketball player (born 1985)

Sofoklis Schortsanitis Σοφοκλής Σχορτσανίτης
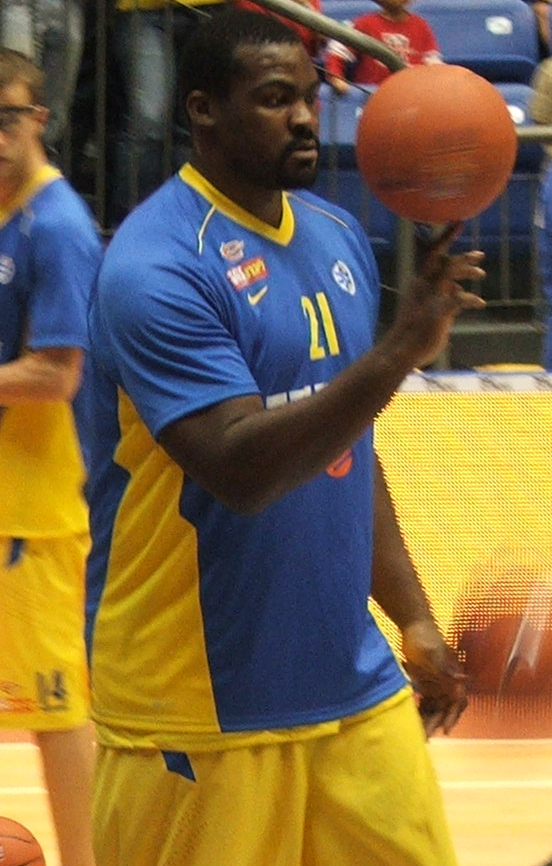
- Schortsanitis with Maccabi Tel Aviv in 2011

Personal information
- Born: 22 June 1985 (age 41) Tiko, Cameroon
- Listed height: 6 ft 10 in (2.08 m)
- Listed weight: 380 lb (172 kg)

Career information
- NBA draft: 2003: 2nd round, 34th overall pick
- Drafted by: Los Angeles Clippers
- Playing career: 2000–2020
- Position: Center
- Number: 21, 15, 5, 18, 12, 6, 22

Career history
- 2000–2003: Iraklis
- 2003–2004: Cantù
- 2004–2005: Aris Thessaloniki
- 2005–2010: Olympiacos
- 2010–2012: Maccabi Tel Aviv
- 2012–2013: Panathinaikos
- 2013–2015: Maccabi Tel Aviv
- 2015: Crvena zvezda
- 2015–2016: PAOK
- 2017–2018: Aries Trikala
- 2019–2020: Ionikos Nikaias

Career highlights
- EuroLeague champion (2014); All-EuroLeague First Team (2011); FIBA EuroStar (2007); Greek League champion (2013); 2× Greek Cup winner (2010, 2013); All-Greek League Team (2006); 6× Greek All-Star (2005, 2006, 2007, 2010, 2013, 2020); 2× Greek All-Star Game MVP (2006, 2010); Greek League Hall of Fame (2022); Adriatic League champion (2012); 3× Israeli Super League champion (2011, 2012, 2014); 4× Israeli State Cup winner (2011, 2012, 2014, 2015); Albert Schweitzer Under-18 World Tournament MVP (2002); Acropolis Tournament MVP (2010)
- Stats at Basketball Reference
Medals
Event	1st	2nd	3rd
FIBA World Cup	0	1	0
FIBA Stanković World Cup	1	0	0
FIBA EuroBasket	0	0	1
FIBA Under-19 World Cup	0	0	1
Albert Schweitzer U-18 World Tournament	1	0	0
FIBA U-18 European Championship	0	0	1
Total	2	1	3
Representing Greece
Men's basketball
FIBA World Cup
Silver medal – second place	2006 Japan	
FIBA Stanković World Cup
Gold medal – first place	2006 China	
FIBA EuroBasket
Bronze medal – third place	2009 Poland	
FIBA U19 World Cup
Bronze medal – third place	2003 Greece	Under-19
Albert Schweitzer U18 World Tournament
Gold medal – first place	2002 Germany	Under-18
FIBA Europe U18 Championship
Bronze medal – third place	2002 Germany	Under-18

Sofoklis Schortsanitis (Greek: Σοφοκλής Σχορτσανίτης; born 22 June 1985) is a Greek-Cameroonian former professional basketball player and Olympian.

An All-EuroLeague First Team selection in 2011, Schortsanitis won the EuroLeague title in 2014 with Maccabi Tel Aviv, and reached the EuroLeague Final in 2010 and 2011, while playing for Olympiacos and Maccabi, respectively. He was a member of the Greece men's national basketball team that captured silver medal honours in the 2006 FIBA World Championship and a bronze medal in the EuroBasket 2009. He is nicknamed "Big Sofo" or "Baby Shaq".

== Early years ==
Born in his native port town of Tiko, Cameroon, to a Greek father and a Cameroonian mother, Schortsanitis moved to Greece with his mother at a very young age. He has a younger brother, Alexandros. He grew up in Kavala, where his parents encouraged him to try basketball. Initially reluctant, he disliked the sport at first, but with constant practice he gradually developed a passion for it. His emerging talent soon caught the eye of a scout/coach, who guided him into pursuing basketball seriously.

== Professional career ==
Schortsanitis began playing professional basketball with Iraklis in the 2000–01 Greek League season. Starting in the 2002–03 Greek League season when he was 17, he averaged 11.5 points and 6.2 rebounds per league game. His performance record would be a failure in Cantù's 2003–04 season, in the Italian League; he lacked maturity and experience. He would return to Greece to play in the 2004–05 season with the Greek club Aris.

=== Olympiacos ===
In the 2005–06 season, Schortsanitis was transferred to Olympiacos. He became a vital member of the team that reached the EuroLeague quarterfinals, and his performances impressed Panagiotis Giannakis, who picked him for the Greece men's national basketball team at the end of the season.

During the following two years, Schortsanitis failed to achieve consistency, and his chronic weight issues reemerged, to the point that he spent almost the entire 2007–08 season dealing with them. He came back in shape for the 2008–09 season, and helped Olympiacos reach the EuroLeague Final Four. In the 2009–10 season, he made another step towards consistency, displaying his most mature performances with Olympiacos, on the club's way to the EuroLeague Final, which they lost to Juan Carlos Navarro's and Ricky Rubio's Barcelona, 86–68.

=== Maccabi Tel Aviv ===
On 5 August 2010, Schortsanitis signed a two-year deal with the then five-time EuroLeague champions, Maccabi Tel Aviv of the Israeli Premier League. His presence alongside Jeremy Pargo, Chuck Eidson, and Doron Perkins helped the team reach the 2011 EuroLeague Final, where they eventually lost to Dimitris Diamantidis' Panathinaikos, by a score of 78–70. Schortsanitis averaged 12 points, 4.1 rebounds and 1 assist per game throughout the EuroLeague 2010–11 season, earning an All-EuroLeague First Team selection.

In the 2011–12 season, Schortsanitis fought a chronic knee injury, which affected his performance during the season, and left him unable to participate with the national team that summer. Nevertheless, he helped Maccabi reach the EuroLeague quarterfinals, where they were topped by Panathinaikos, losing the series, 3–2.

=== Panathinaikos ===
On 4 July 2012, Schortsanitis signed a three-year contract with the Greek club Panathinaikos, worth €1.5 million euros net income. He reportedly turned down significantly more lucrative offers from Baskonia Vitoria and Galatasaray, among others, to return to Greece and fulfill his desire to play for Panathinaikos. In July 2013, Panathinaikos announced that Schortsanitis would not continue play for the club.

=== Second stint with Maccabi ===
On 10 July 2013, Schortsanitis returned to Maccabi after one season in Panathinaikos, and signed a three-year contract with the defending Israeli Premier League champions. In his comeback season with Maccabi, the club won the finals of that season's EuroLeague, which was the first EuroLeague championship won in Schortsanitis' career. Over 29 games played in the EuroLeague that season, he averaged 9.6 points and 2.6 rebounds per game, in 14.2 minutes per game of playing time.

=== Crvena zvezda ===
On 2 August 2015, Schortsanitis signed a one-year contract with the Serbian club Crvena zvezda. On 28 October 2015, he parted ways with Zvezda. In 6 games played with the club in the ABA League's 2015–16 season, he averaged 4.8 points and 2.5 rebounds per game.

=== PAOK ===
On 2 November 2015, Schortsanitis signed with the Greek club PAOK, for the rest of the season. With PAOK, he averaged 13.4 points, 4.4 rebounds, and 1.8 assists per game, in the European-wide 2nd-tier level EuroCup's 2015–16 season.

=== Apollon Patras ===
In December 2016, Schortsanitis joined the Greek club Apollon Patras. However, on 28 December, he suffered a serious injury, as he ruptured his Achilles tendon, during one of the team's practices. The injury caused him to then miss the entire remainder of the Greek Basket League 2016–17 season, and he was thus not able to play in any games with Apollon.

=== Aries Trikala ===
On 18 October 2017, Schortsanitis returned to action, and joined Aries Trikala of the Greek Basket League, for the 2017–18 season. On 6 January 2018, he made his debut in a 76–86 loss to Rethymno Cretan Kings, recording 6 points and one rebound, off the bench.

=== Ionikos Nikaias ===
On 24 July 2019, Schortsanitis signed with Ionikos Nikaias for the Greek Basket League 2019–20 season.

=== NBA draft rights ===
Schortsanitis drew interest from the NBA's Los Angeles Clippers in the summer of 2006, after having been originally selected in the 2nd round (34th overall) of the 2003 NBA draft; however, because he was still under contract with Olympiacos at the time, he did not make a move to the NBA. In 2010, his contract with Olympiacos expired, and he elected to participate in the NBA Summer League with the Clippers, with an eye towards joining the team; this time, however, the Clippers were unimpressed, and he failed to secure a contract with the team. On 30 July 2012, the Los Angeles Clippers traded the draft rights of Schortsanitis to the Atlanta Hawks in a sign-and-trade deal for Willie Green.

On 15 July 2014, his draft rights were traded to the Oklahoma City Thunder in exchange for Thabo Sefolosha, the rights to Georgios Printezis, and cash considerations.

=== Retirement ===
On 10 December 2020, Schortsanitis announced his retirement from playing pro club basketball. Thus, making him one of the eleven players from the 2003 NBA draft Class to have never played in the NBA.

== National team career ==
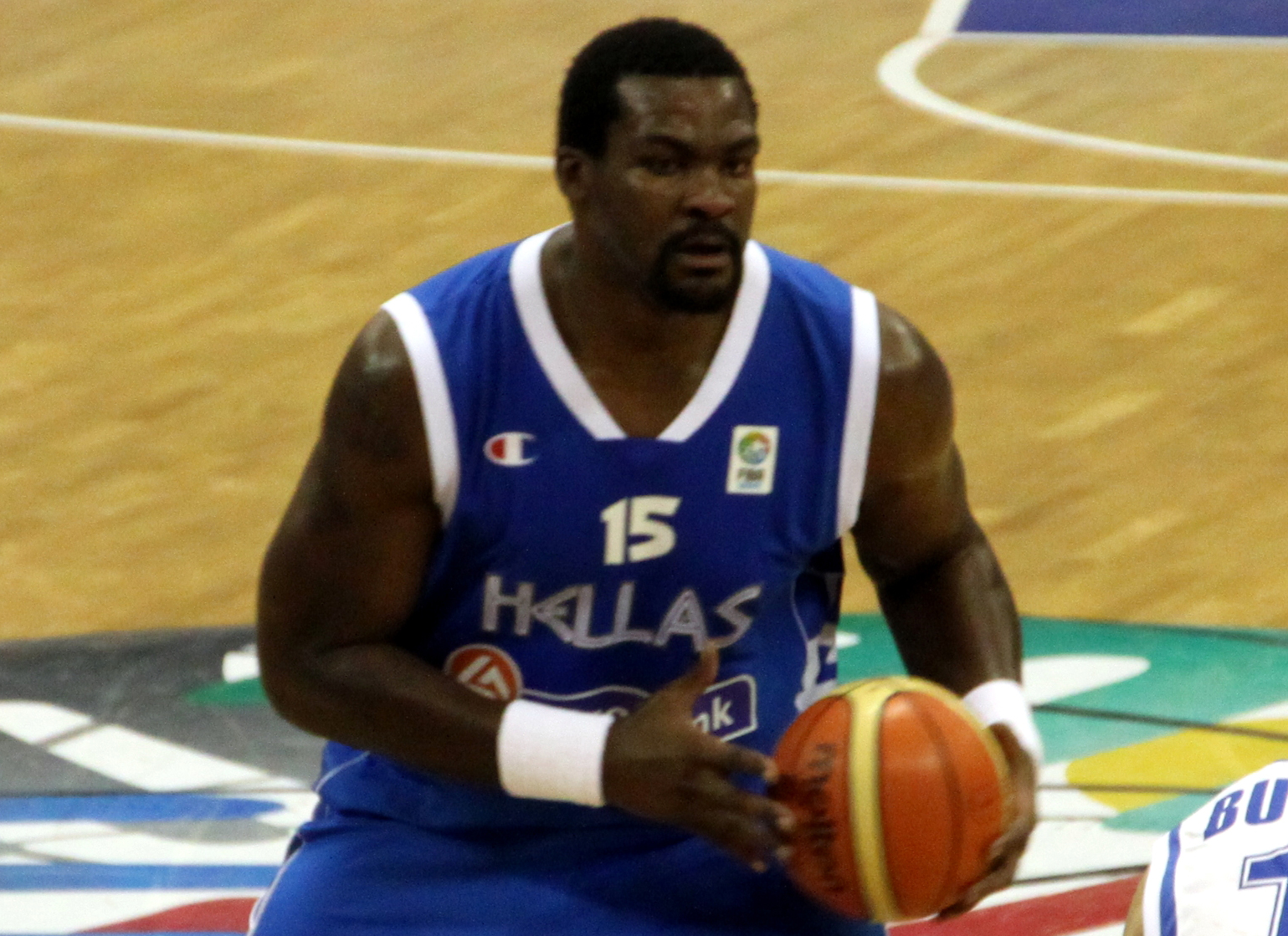
Schortsanitis playing for the Greece men's national basketball team.

=== Greek youth national teams ===
Schortsanitis was on the squad of the Under-16 national team that played at the 2001 FIBA Europe Under-16 Championship, the squad of the Under-18 national team that won a bronze medal at the 2002 FIBA Europe Under-18 Championship, and the squad of the Under-19 national team that won a bronze medal at the 2003 FIBA Under-19 World Cup. Schortsanitis was on the squad of the junior national team that won the gold medal at the 2002 Albert Schweitzer Under-18 World Tournament, where he was also named the MVP of the tournament.

=== Greece national team ===
Play at friendly games and qualifiers were Schortsanitis' introduction to being on the senior Greek national team, before making his first appearance at a major FIBA competition at the 2006 FIBA World Championship, which was held in Japan. He helped Greece win the silver medal, after they defeated Team USA, by 101–95, in the semifinals. Schortsanitis scored 14 points, in 17 minutes in the game. He also played for Greece at the 2008 Summer Olympics.

At the 2009 EuroBasket, which was held in Poland, Schortsanitis' performance was decisive in Greece winning the tournament's bronze medal game against Slovenia, as he scored 23 points on a 78% field goal shooting percentage, while grabbing six rebounds, blocking two shots, and managing to draw 12 fouls. He also played at the 2010 FIBA World Championship.

== Player profile ==
Schortsanitis is a classic, "old school" style center that plays in the low post on offence, and that defends the rim and painted lane area of the court on defense. Schortsanitis was measured at the 2003 NBA pre-draft camp at a height of 6 ft 8 in (2.03 m) tall barefoot, 6 ft 10 in (2.08 m) tall with shoes on, and with a 7 ft 2 in (2.18 m) wingspan.

His official playing weight was listed as 380 pounds (172 kg).

== Career statistics ==
Legend
GP	Games played	GS	Games started	MPG	Minutes per game
FG%	Field-goal percentage	3P%	3-point field-goal percentage	FT%	Free-throw percentage
RPG	Rebounds per game	APG	Assists per game	SPG	Steals per game
BPG	Blocks per game	PPG	Points per game	PIR	Performance index rating
**Bold**	Career high

=== EuroLeague ===
†	Denotes seasons in which Schortsanitis won the EuroLeague

Year	Team	GP	GS	MPG	FG%	3P%	FT%	RPG	APG	SPG	BPG	PPG	PIR
2005–06	Olympiacos	22	1	19.1	.618	—	**.632**	**4.9**	.5	**1.2**	**.6**	10.7	12.0
2006–07	Olympiacos	17	1	11.0	**.655**	—	.507	1.8	.7	.4	.4	6.6	5.4
2008–09	Olympiacos	13	1	8.3	.568	.000	.625	1.8	.3	.2	.1	4.4	2.8
2009–10	Olympiacos	19	18	13.3	.614	—	.486	2.5	.6	.5	.2	7.2	6.6
2010–11	Maccabi	22	**20**	**19.2**	.585	—	.625	4.1	1.0	.8	**.6**	**12.0**	**13.0**
2011–12	Maccabi	21	14	16.0	.595	—	.625	3.0	1.0	.6	.4	8.7	8.6
2012–13	Panathinaikos	26	9	12.1	.576	—	.604	2.3	.9	.3	.1	7.8	6.4
2013–14†	Maccabi	**29**	**20**	14.2	.613	—	.577	2.6	**1.1**	.8	.3	9.6	8.3
2014–15	Maccabi	26	**20**	14.7	.528	—	.549	2.3	1.0	.3	.4	6.7	5.9
2015–16	Crvena zvezda	2	1	15.2	.500	—	.500	.5	—	—	.5	4.5	-1.5
Career		197	105	14.5	.592	.000	.583	2.9	.8	.6	.4	8.4	7.9

== Awards and accomplishments ==
=== Professional career ===
- 6× Greek League All-Star Game: (2005, 2006, 2007, 2010, 2013, 2020)
- 2× Greek All-Star Game MVP: (2006, 2010)
- Greek League Best Five: (2006)
- 2× Greek Cup Winner: (2010, 2013)
- 4× Israeli State Cup Winner: (2011, 2012, 2014, 2015)
- EuroLeague Champion: (2014)
- All-EuroLeague First Team: (2011)
- 3× Israeli Super League Champion: (2011, 2012, 2014)
- Adriatic League Champion: (2012)
- Greek League Champion: (2013)

=== Greek junior national team ===
- 2001 FIBA Europe Under-16 Championship: All-First Team Selection
- 2002 Albert Schweitzer Under-18 World Tournament: Gold
- 2002 Albert Schweitzer Under-18 World Tournament: MVP
- 2002 FIBA Europe Under-18 Championship: Bronze
- 2003 FIBA Under-19 World Cup: Bronze

=== Greek senior national team ===
- 2006 FIBA World Championship: Silver
- 2006 FIBA Stanković World Cup: Gold
- FIBA EuroStar: (2007)
- 2009 EuroBasket: Bronze
- Acropolis Tournament MVP: 2010
