= Nemanja Dangubić =

Serbian basketball player (born 1993)

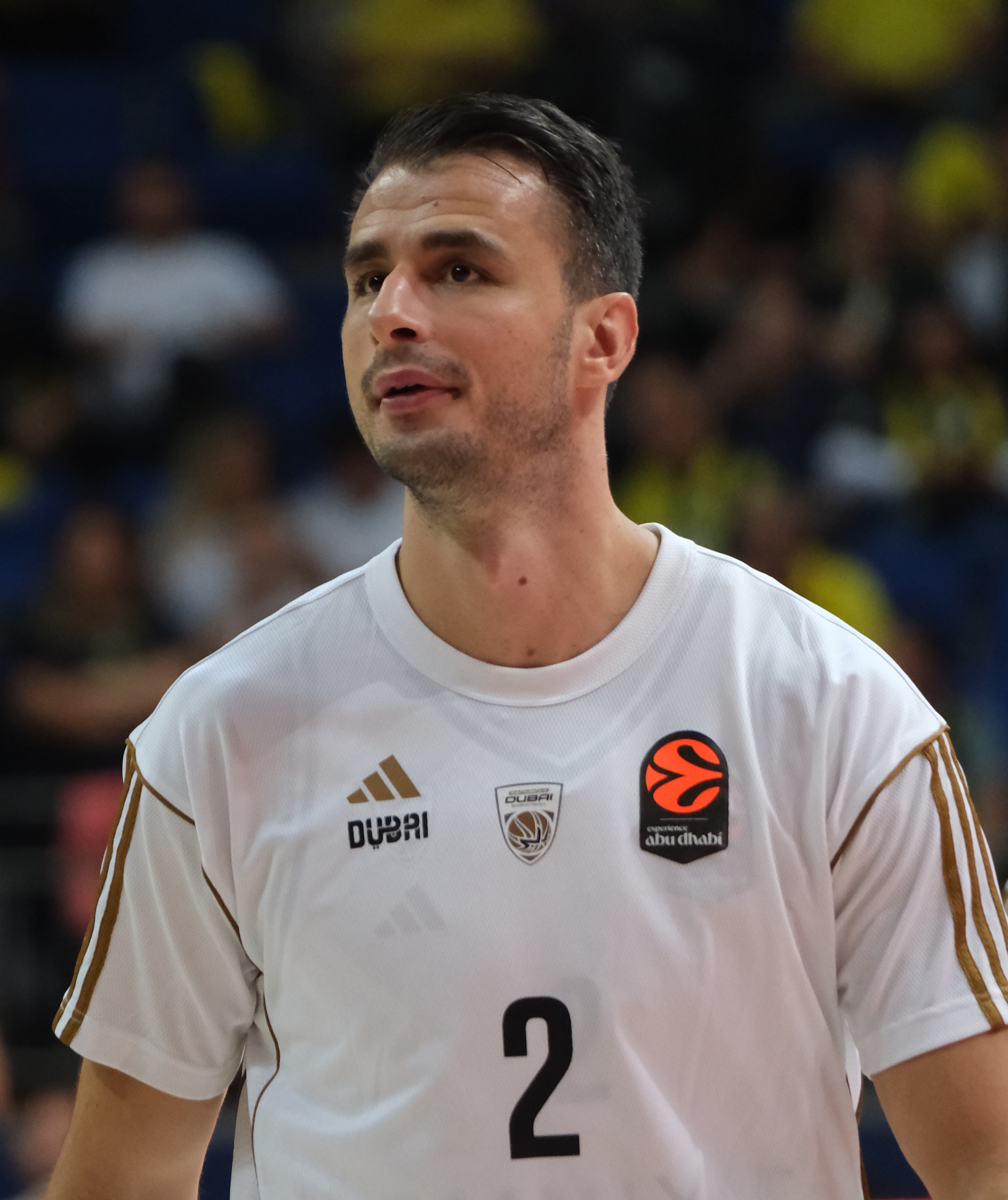
- Dangubić with Dubai Basketball in 2025

No. 2 – Dubai Basketball
- Position: Small forward
- League: ABA League; EuroLeague

Personal information
- Born: 13 April 1993 (age 33) Pančevo, Serbia, FR Yugoslavia
- Listed height: 2.04 m (6 ft 8 in)
- Listed weight: 88 kg (194 lb)

Career information
- NBA draft: 2014: 2nd round, 54th overall pick
- Drafted by: Philadelphia 76ers
- Playing career: 2011–present

Career history
- 2011–2012: Hemofarm
- 2012–2014: Mega Vizura
- 2014–2018: Crvena zvezda
- 2018–2019: Bayern Munich
- 2019–2020: Estudiantes
- 2020–2022: Partizan
- 2022–2023: Promitheas Patras
- 2023–2024: Peristeri
- 2024–present: Dubai Basketball

Career highlights
- 3× ABA League champion (2015–2017); German League champion (2019); 4× Serbian League champion (2015–2018); 2× Serbian Cup winner (2015, 2017)
- Stats at Basketball Reference
Medals
Men's basketball
Representing Serbia
U19 World Cup
Silver medal – second place	2011 Latvia	U19 Team
U18 European Championship
Silver medal – second place	2011 Poland	U18 Team

Nemanja Dangubić (Serbian: Немања Дангубић, born 13 April 1993) is a Serbian professional basketball player for Dubai Basketball of the ABA League and the EuroLeague. His drafts rights are owned by the Memphis Grizzlies of the National Basketball Association (NBA). He was selected by the Philadelphia 76ers with the 54th overall pick in the 2014 NBA draft.

== Professional career ==
In 2010, Dangubić joined the Hemofarm junior team, before joining the senior team for the 2011–12 season.

In July 2012, Dangubić signed with Mega Vizura.

=== Crvena zvezda (2014–2018) ===
On 31 July 2014 Dangubić signed a three-year deal with an opt-out clause after each season with Crvena zvezda. In 2014–15 season, Crvena zvezda won the Adriatic League championship, the Serbian League championship and the Radivoj Korać Cup.

On 10 July 2016 he re-signed with the team until the end of 2017–18 season. In March 2018, it was announced that Dangubić will miss the remainder of the 2017–18 season due to knee injury. He left Zvezda in summer 2018.

=== Bayern Munich (2018–2019) ===
On 18 September 2018 Bayern Munich of the Basketball Bundesliga (BBL) was reported to have signed Dangubić to a one-year deal.

=== Estudiantes (2019–2020) ===
In July 2019, Dangubić signed with the Spanish club Estudiantes.

=== Partizan (2020–2022) ===
On 10 July 2020, Dangubić signed a two-year contract with Partizan Belgrade. In the 2020–21 ABA season, he averaged 7.5 points and 2.9 rebounds over 24 games. In July 2022, he left Partizan.

=== Promitheas Patras (2022–2023) ===
On 18 October 2022, Dangubić signed with Greek EuroCup side Promitheas Patras for the rest of the season, replacing Jericole Hellems. In 19 domestic league matches, he averaged 7.4 points and 3.1 rebounds in 22 minutes per contest.

=== Peristeri (2023–2024) ===
On 24 July 2023, Dangubić signed with Peristeri, remaining in the Greek Basket League.

=== Dubai (2024–present) ===
On July 13, 2024, Dangubić signed with Dubai of the ABA League. Over 32 games, he averaged 5.3 points and 3.2 rebounds on 46.3% shooting from the field. Dubai finished the season with loss in the semifinals series to Partizan Belgrade. In March 2026 it was announced that Dangubić had agreed to a contract extension

=== NBA draft rights ===
On 26 June 2014 Dangubić was selected with the 54th overall pick in the 2014 NBA draft by the Philadelphia 76ers. He was later traded to the San Antonio Spurs on draft night. On 6 July 2019 his draft right was traded to the Brooklyn Nets in a three-team trade. On 19 July 2024, the Nets traded his draft rights to the Memphis Grizzlies.

== National team career ==
Dangubić helped Serbia win silver medals at the 2011 FIBA Under-19 World Championship and the 2011 FIBA Europe Under-18 Championship. While originally in line to make the Serbian squad for the 2014 FIBA World Cup, Dangubić was forced to leave the team's training camp before it had actually begun after suffering from a knee injury.

== Career statistics ==
Legend
GP	Games played	GS	Games started	MPG	Minutes per game
FG%	Field-goal percentage	3P%	3-point field-goal percentage	FT%	Free-throw percentage
RPG	Rebounds per game	APG	Assists per game	SPG	Steals per game
BPG	Blocks per game	PPG	Points per game	PIR	Performance index rating
**Bold**	Career high

=== EuroLeague ===
Year	Team	GP	GS	MPG	FG%	3P%	FT%	RPG	APG	SPG	BPG	PPG	PIR
2014–15	Crvena zvezda	23	11	14.2	38.2	34.2	68.4	2.0	0.7	0.4	**0.1**	4.1	1.9
2015–16	Crvena zvezda	19	15	15.9	**55.1**	45.2	69.2	1.9	0.8	0.3	**0.1**	5.2	3.4
2016–17	Crvena zvezda	24	**24**	19.3	38.2	29.6	**84.2**	2.0	0.7	0.6	**0.1**	5.3	2.5
2017–18	Crvena zvezda	18	15	**20.2**	46.9	**46.8**	80.0	**3.4**	**1.2**	**0.7**	**0.1**	**7.4**	**6.7**
2018–19	Bayern Munich	**30**	1	14.8	41.2	39.5	75.7	2.4	0.5	0.3	**0.1**	4.2	3.9
Career		84	65	17.3	42.3	38.2	76.3	2.3	0.8	0.5	0.1	5.4	3.4

=== EuroCup ===
Year	Team	GP	GS	MPG	FG	3P%	FT	RPG	APG	SPG	BPG	PPG	PIR
2020–21	Partizan	**16**	**13**	**21.0**	**37.8**	**36.8**	52.9	**3.0**	0.6	**0.8**	**0.8**	**5.3**	**4.1**
2021–22	Partizan	12	3	12.5	34.4	29.4	**91.7**	1.8	**0.7**	0.4	0.2	3.2	1.8

=== Domestic leagues ===
Season	Team	League	GP	MPG	FG%	3P%	FT%	RPG	APG	SPG	BPG	PPG
2011–12	Hemofarm	Adriatic League	24	14.5	34.1	12.5	75.8	1.0	1.0	0.3	0.0	3.6
2011–12	Hemofarm	Serbian KLS	14	16.6	38.7	25.0	54.2	2.5	1.4	0.4	0.1	4.7
2012–13	Mega Vizura	Serbian KLS	**41**	26.5	43.6	29.0	66.3	3.1	**2.8**	0.8	0.2	9.0
2013–14	Mega Vizura	Adriatic League	25	24.9	45.1	28.8	64.0	3.4	2.0	0.8	0.2	9.4
2013–14	Mega Vizura	Serbian KLS	15	**27.9**	48.1	27.9	66.1	**3.6**	1.9	0.4	0.3	**11.7**
2014–15	Crvena zvezda	Adriatic League	32	15.7	41.3	30.9	70.5	2.6	1.3	0.7	0.2	5.8
2014–15	Crvena zvezda	Serbian KLS	19	19.4	42.5	29.1	82.4	2.7	.8	0.5	0.1	7.7
2015–16	Crvena zvezda	Adriatic League	19	15.4	39.0	33.3	62.5	1.5	1.1	0.4	0.1	4.8
2015–16	Crvena zvezda	Serbian KLS	12	18.9	40.6	32.4	76.9	1.8	1.0	0.7	0.1	6.1
2016–17	Crvena zvezda	Adriatic League	25	20.6	41.7	32.4	68.0	2.8	1.6	0.8	0.4	7.8
2016–17	Crvena zvezda	Serbian KLS	19	22.4	41.3	31.6	85.7	3.7	2.2	0.5	0.0	7.8
2017–18	Crvena zvezda	Adriatic League	18	18.2	41.1	40.4	84.4	2.8	0.9	0.3	0.2	6.7
2017–18	Crvena zvezda	Radivoj Korać Cup	3	19.0	40.0	28.6	66.7	1.3	1.3	0.6	**0.6**	8.6
2018–19	Bayern Munich	BBL	36	17.3	42.0	30.3	78.7	3.2	0.9	0.8	0.1	5.3
2018–19	Bayern Munich	Zadar SuperCup	3	19.5	50.0	50.0	61.5	2.3	1.6	1.6	0.0	6.3
2018–19	Bayern Munich	BBL-Pokal	1	13.3	**66.7**	**100.0**	0.0	0.0	1.0	**3.0**	0.0	5.0
2020–21	Partizan Nis	Adriatic League	24	23.1	40.6	37.3	62.9	2.9	0.6	0.5	0.3	7.5
2020–21	Partizan Nis	Serbian KLS	5	21.1	35.9	29.4	75.0	3.0	1.4	0.4	0.2	8.4
2020–21	Partizan Nis	Radivoj Korać Cup	2	23.9	63.6	83.3	**100.0**	2.0	1.5	0.5	0.0	10.5
2021–22	Partizan Nis	Adriatic League	16	12.3	32.7	25.8	77.8	1.9	0.8	0.4	0.1	3.1
2021–22	Partizan Nis	Radivoj Korać Cup	3	14.9	53.3	37.5	**100.0**	3.0	2.6	0.6	0.3	6.6

== See also ==
- List of KK Crvena zvezda players with 100 games played
- List of NBA drafted players from Serbia
- Philadelphia 76ers draft history
