= 2008–09 KK Partizan season =

Partizan Belgrade
2008–09 season
- President: Predrag Danilović
- Head coach: Duško Vujošević
- Basketball League of Serbia: Champion
- Radivoj Korać Cup: Champion
- Adriatic League: Champion
- Euroleague: Quarterfinals
- Highest home attendance: vs Panathinaikos (22,567)

In the 2008–09 season, Partizan Belgrade will compete in the Basketball League of Serbia, Radivoj Korać Cup, Adriatic League and Euroleague.

== Players ==
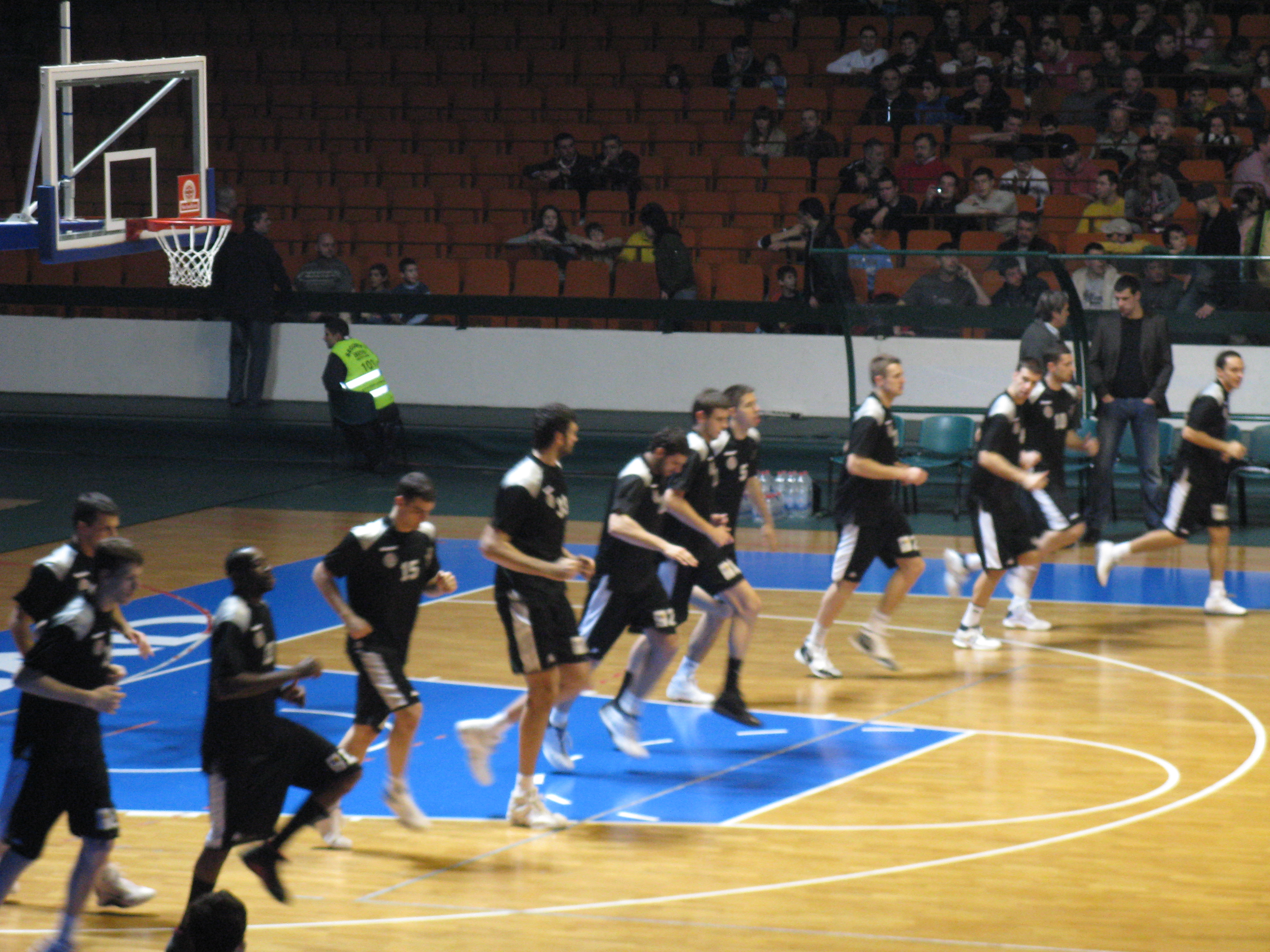
Partizan's team in 2008–09 season

=== Roster ===
KK Partizan roster
Players
Coaches

Pos.	No.	Nat.	Name	Ht.	Wt.	Age
F	4	(Serbia)	Lučić, Vladimir	2.02 m (6 ft 8 in)	91 kg (201 lb)	35 – 17 June 1989
G	5	(Serbia)	Tepić, Milenko	2.02 m (6 ft 8 in)	102 kg (225 lb)	38 – 27 February 1987
G	6	(Serbia)	Riznić, Bogdan	2.01 m (6 ft 7 in)	80 kg (176 lb)	35 – 24 February 1990
F	8	(Serbia)	Milošević, Strahinja	2.03 m (6 ft 8 in)	104 kg (229 lb)	39 – 25 September 1985
G	10	(Serbia)	Rašić, Aleksandar	1.95 m (6 ft 5 in)	90 kg (198 lb)	41 – 16 March 1984
G	11	(Serbia)	Tripković, Uroš	1.96 m (6 ft 5 in)	88 kg (194 lb)	38 – 11 September 1986
F	12	(Serbia)	Veličković, Novica	2.05 m (6 ft 9 in)	109 kg (240 lb)	38 – 5 October 1986
C	13	(Gabon)	Lasme, Stéphane	2.03 m (6 ft 8 in)	98 kg (216 lb)	42 – 17 December 1982
PG	14	(Serbia)	Aleksić, Vukašin	1.82 m (6 ft 0 in)	78 kg (172 lb)	40 – 10 January 1985
F	15	(Serbia)	Vitkovac, Čedomir	2.01 m (6 ft 7 in)	102 kg (225 lb)	42 – 28 October 1982
C	18	(Serbia)	Bešović, Nemanja	2.19 m (7 ft 2 in)	107 kg (236 lb)	32 – 8 June 1992
G	20	(Serbia)	Božić, Petar (C)	1.97 m (6 ft 6 in)	100 kg (220 lb)	46 – 6 December 1978
C	22	(Montenegro)	Rakočević, Žarko	2.04 m (6 ft 8 in)	115 kg (254 lb)	41 – 4 January 1984
F/C	24	(Czech Republic)	Veselý, Jan	2.11 m (6 ft 11 in)	110 kg (243 lb)	34 – 24 April 1990
C	33	(Montenegro)	Vraneš, Slavko	2.29 m (7 ft 6 in)	135 kg (298 lb)	42 – 30 January 1983

Head coach

- (Serbia) Duško Vujošević

Legend

- (C) Team captain
- Injured

- Roster

=== Current depth chart ===
Pos.	Starter	Bench	Bench	Reserve
C	Stéphane Lasme	Slavko Vraneš	Nemanja Bešović
PF	Novica Veličković	Žarko Rakočević
SF	Jan Veselý	Čedomir Vitkovac	Strahinja Milošević	Vladimir Lučić
SG	Milenko Tepić	Uroš Tripković	Bogdan Riznić
PG	Aleksandar Rašić	Petar Božić	Vukašin Aleksić

== Preseason and friendlies ==
26 August 2008	Partizan Belgrade (Serbia)	58–51	(Ukraine) Khimik	Belgrade
	Pts: Vitkovac, Milošević, Đurković 11		Pts: Jackson 15	Arena: Pionir Hall

1 September 2008	Vojvodina (Serbia)	54–79	(Serbia) Partizan Belgrade	Novi Sad
	Pts: Jovanović 15		Pts: Vitkovac 16	Arena: SPENS

3 September 2008	Tamiš (Serbia)	69–98	(Serbia) Partizan Belgrade	Belgrade
	Pts: ?		Pts: Đurković 16

6 September 2008	Partizan Belgrade (Serbia)	74–65	(Serbia) Vojvodina	Belgrade
	Pts: Đurković 16		Pts: ?

8 September 2008	Partizan Belgrade (Serbia)	87–69	(Bosnia and Herzegovina) Igokea	Belgrade
	Scoring by quarter: 21–21, 29–11, 15–15, 22–22
	Pts: Vitkovac 20		Pts: ?

12 September 2008	Šabac (Serbia)	74–102	(Serbia) Partizan Belgrade	Šabac
	Scoring by quarter: 17–25, 26–33, 19–31, 12–15
	Pts: Dušanović 23		Pts: Vitkovac 15

13 September 2008	Metalac (Serbia)	77–82	(Serbia) Partizan Belgrade	Valjevo
	Scoring by quarter: 17–26, 21–11, 17'–26, 22–19
	Pts: Ljubojević 21		Pts: Rakočević 21	Arena: Valjevo Sports Hall

15 September 2008	Partizan Belgrade (Serbia)	61–64	(Greece) Panathinaikos	Valjevo
	Scoring by quarter: 20–31, 18–9, 10–12, 13–12
	Pts: Božić 18		Pts: Nicholas 17	Arena: Valjevo Sports Hall

20 September 2008	Olympiacos (Greece)	74–77	(Serbia) Partizan Belgrade	Rhodes, Greece
	Scoring by quarter: 25–22, 13–16, 18–11, 18–28
	Pts: ?		Pts: Rakočević 19

21 September 2008	Kolossos Rodou (Greece)	63–54	(Serbia) Partizan Belgrade	Rhodes, Greece
	Scoring by quarter: 14–13, 15–11, 18–14, 16–16
	Pts: ?		Pts: Vitkovac 15

26 September 2008	ABS Primorje (Montenegro)	65–87	(Serbia) Partizan Belgrade	Igalo, Montenegro
	Scoring by quarter: 16–24, 16–27, 18–16, 14–20
	Pts: ?		Pts: Lučić 17

27 September 2008	Budućnost Podgorica (Montenegro)	94–74	(Serbia) Partizan Belgrade	Igalo, Montenegro
	Scoring by quarter: 24–13, 16–21, 36–22, 18–18
	Pts: ?		Pts: Rakočević 21

== Competitions ==
	Competition	Position	Record
(Serbia)	Basketball League of Serbia	Winners	12–3
(Serbia)	Radivoj Korać Cup	Winners	3–0
(European Union)	Adriatic League	Winners	25–3
(European Union)	Euroleague	Quarterfinals	9–10

== Basketball League of Serbia ==
=== Group A ===
Pos	Team	Total						
Pos	Team	P	W	L	F	A	D	Pts
1	Partizan Belgrade	6	6	0	488	352	+136	12
2	FMP	6	3	3	436	439	-3	9
3	Vojvodina	6	2	4	442	525	-83	8
4	Metalac	6	1	5	420	470	-50	7

P=Matches played, W=Matches won, L=Matches lost, F=Points for, A=Points against, D=Points difference, Pts=Points

10 April 2009 1	Partizan Belgrade	84–56	FMP	Belgrade
	Scoring by quarter: 16-10, 31-19, 14-17, 23-10
	Pts: Tripković 24	Report	Pts: Protić 13	Arena: Pionir Hall

12 April 2009 2	Partizan Belgrade	80–60	Metalac	Belgrade
	Scoring by quarter: 19-21, 26-13, 14-9, 21-17
	Pts: Veličković 16	Report	Pts: Gagović 12	Arena: Pionir Hall

21 April 2009 3	Vojvodina	66–84	Partizan Belgrade	Novi Sad
	Scoring by quarter: 13-17, 19-27, 17-19, 17-21
	Pts: Šutalo 18	Report	Pts: Božić 15	Arena: SPENS

21 April 2009 4	FMP	63–69	Partizan Belgrade	Belgrade
	Scoring by quarter: 16-11, 16-22, 16-18, 15-18
	Pts: Jeremić 12	Report	Pts: Lasme 22	Arena: Železnik Hall

25 April 2009 5	Metalac	50–76	Partizan Belgrade	Valjevo
	Scoring by quarter: 15-26, 18-18, 6-13, 11-19
	Pts: Marojević 13	Report	Pts: Tripković 17	Arena: Valjevo Sports Hall

27 April 2009 6	Partizan Belgrade	95–57	Vojvodina	Belgrade
	Scoring by quarter: 27-18, 27-11, 18-21, 23-7
	Pts: Tripković, Vitkovac 16	Report	Pts: Fisher 23	Arena: Pionir Hall

==== Semifinals ====
30 April 2009 Semifinals game 1	Partizan Belgrade	62–37 (Series: 1–0)	Hemofarm	Belgrade
	Scoring by quarter: 18-6, 21-12, 13-7, 10-12
	Pts: Veličković 12	Report	Pts: Mačvan 7	Arena: Pionir Hall

2 May 2009 Semifinals game 2	Hemofarm	73–79 (Series: 0–2)	Partizan Belgrade	Vršac
	Scoring by quarter: 14-16, 22-19, 17-24, 20-20
	Pts: Joksimović 15	Report	Pts: Tripković 17	Arena: Millennium Center

5 May 2009 Semifinals game 3	Partizan Belgrade	67–79 (Series: 2–1)	Hemofarm	Belgrade
	Scoring by quarter: 8-21, 21-20, 20-14, 18-24
	Pts: Veličković 16	Report	Pts: Borisov 22	Arena: Pionir Hall

7 May 2009 Semifinals game 4	Hemofarm	69–77 (Series: 1–3)	Partizan Belgrade	Vršac
	Scoring by quarter: 16-22, 24-15, 11-12, 18-28
	Pts: Pavković 19	Report	Pts: Lasme 20	Arena: Millennium Center

==== Final ====
13 May 2009 Final game 1	Partizan Belgrade	70–58 (Series: 1–0)	Crvena zvezda	Belgrade
	Scoring by quarter: 17-16, 21-16, 15-16, 17-10
	Pts: Veličković 15	Report	Pts: Štimac 17	Arena: Pionir Hall

15 May 2009 Final game 2	Crvena zvezda	54–68 (Series: 0–2)	Partizan Belgrade	Belgrade
	Scoring by quarter: 11-16, 12-19, 21-17, 10-16
	Pts: Marinović 16	Report	Pts: Tripković 19	Arena: Pionir Hall

18 May 2009 Final game 3	Partizan Belgrade	58–63 (Series: 2–1)	Crvena zvezda	Belgrade
	Scoring by quarter: 14-23, 18-12, 7-10, 19-18
	Pts: Lasme 12	Report	Pts: Marković 15	Arena: Pionir Hall

21 May 2009 Final game 4	Crvena zvezda	75–73 (Series: 2–2)	Partizan Belgrade	Belgrade
	Scoring by quarter: 17-20, 18-12, 21-14, 19-27
	Pts: Štimac, Bakić, Bjelica 13	Report	Pts: Tripković 16	Arena: Pionir Hall

23 May 2009 Final game 5	Partizan Belgrade	73–61 (Series: 3–2)	Crvena zvezda	Belgrade
	Scoring by quarter: 17-15, 17-12, 24-13, 15-21
	Pts: Rašić 17	Report	Pts: Marinović 15	Arena: Pionir Hall

== Adriatic League ==
=== Standings ===
	Team	W	L	Pts	PF:PA	Diff
1	Partizan	23	3	49	1966:1771	195
2	Cibona	19	7	45	2088:1945	143
3	Hemofarm STADA	19	7	45	2082:1987	95
4	Crvena zvezda	19	7	45	2010:1913	97

=== Regular season ===
4 October 2008 1	Partizan Belgrade (Serbia)	74–67	(Slovenia) Krka	Belgrade
	Scoring by quarter: 14-28, 24-10, 23-14, 13-15
	Pts: Tepić 20	Report	Pts: Marcelić 16	Arena: Pionir Hall

7 October 2008 2	Partizan Belgrade (Serbia)	81–65	(Slovenia) Helios	Belgrade
	Scoring by quarter: 20-12, 22-13, 18-21, 21-19
	Pts: Lasme 17; Rebs: Veličković 6 Asts: Rašić 6	Report	Pts: Petrović 13	Arena: Pionir Hall

11 October 2008 3	Hemofarm (Serbia)	73–74	(Serbia) Partizan Belgrade	Vršac
	Scoring by quarter: 27-13, 19-22, 8-22, 19-17
	Pts: Marković 17	Report	Pts: Veličković 20	Arena: Millennium Center

18 October 2008 4	Partizan Belgrade (Serbia)	83–80(OT)	(Croatia) Zadar	Belgrade
	Scoring by quarter: 16-9, 25-20, 19-21, 10-20, Overtime: 13-10
	Pts: Tepić 20	Report	Pts: Dixon 23	Arena: Pionir Hall

25 October 2008 5	Zagreb (Croatia)	91–92(OT)	(Serbia) Partizan Belgrade	Zagreb
	Scoring by quarter: 19-20, 20-16, 24-17, 15-25, Overtime: 13-14
	Pts: Tomić 23; Rebs: Tomić 14	Report	Pts: Tripković 20	Arena: Trnsko Sports Hall

1 November 2008 6	Partizan Belgrade (Serbia)	85–71	(Montenegro) Budućnost	Belgrade
	Scoring by quarter: 24-11, 16-30, 18-18, 27-12
	Pts: Lasme 18; Rebs: Veličković 11	Report	Pts: Micov 18	Arena: Pionir Hall

8 November 2008 7	FMP (Serbia)	66–69	(Serbia) Partizan Belgrade	Belgrade
	Scoring by quarter: 21-16, 20-23, 13-10, 12-20
	Pts: Labović 19	Report	Pts: Tripković 18; Rebs: Lasme 10	Arena: Železnik Hall

16 November 2008 8	Partizan Belgrade (Serbia)	80–81	(Serbia) Crvena zvezda	Belgrade
	Scoring by quarter: 26-20, 23-22, 13-19, 18-20
	Pts: Rakočević 15	Report	Pts: Kikanović 22	Arena: Pionir Hall

22 November 2008 9	Union Olimpija (Slovenia)	61–66	(Serbia) Partizan Belgrade	Ljubljana
	Scoring by quarter: 23-14, 17-12, 13-18, 8-22
	Pts: Ožbolt 14	Report	Pts: Veličković 18	Arena: Tivoli Hall

29 November 2008 10	Partizan Belgrade (Serbia)	81–52	(Serbia) Vojvodina	Belgrade
	Scoring by quarter: 24-12, 17-12, 16-18, 24-10
	Pts: Rakočević, Veličković 14	Report	Pts: Borovnjak 13	Arena: Pionir Hall

6 December 2008 11	Split (Croatia)	60–70	(Serbia) Partizan Belgrade	Split
	Scoring by quarter: 10-13, 21-22, 17-23, 12-12
	Pts: Batina 14	Report	Pts: Veličković 13	Arena: Arena Gripe

14 December 2008 12	Partizan Belgrade (Serbia)	69–56	(Croatia) Cibona	Belgrade
	Scoring by quarter: 18-14, 19-13, 10-11, 22-18
	Pts: Tripković 26	Report	Pts: Calloway 18	Arena: Pionir Hall

20 December 2008 13	Bosna ASA BHT (Bosnia and Herzegovina)	68–72	(Serbia) Partizan Belgrade	Sarajevo
	Scoring by quarter: 21-16, 19-17, 11-9, 17-30
	Pts: Ikonić 21	Report	Pts: Lasme 21	Arena: Dvorana Mirza Delibašić

23 December 2008 14	Krka (Slovenia)	65–80	(Serbia) Partizan Belgrade	Novo Mesto
	Scoring by quarter: 5-23, 20-14, 14-20, 23-26
	Pts: Essington Shields 21	Report	Pts: Veličković 27	Arena: Leon Štukelj Hall

3 January 2009 15	Helios (Slovenia)	49–59	(Serbia) Partizan Belgrade	Domžale
	Scoring by quarter: 6-23, 10-14, 13-17, 20-4
	Pts: Janža 15	Report	Pts: Rašić 13	Arena: Komunalni center Hall

10 January 2009 16	Partizan Belgrade (Serbia)	78–61	(Serbia) Hemofarm	Belgrade
	Scoring by quarter: 19-14, 24-18, 21-16, 14-13
	Pts: Rašić 15	Report	Pts: Marjanović 17	Arena: Pionir Hall

18 January 2009 17	Zadar (Croatia)	74–65	(Serbia) Partizan Belgrade	Zadar
	Scoring by quarter: 19-14, 19-17, 18-21, 18-13
	Pts: Ružić 18	Report	Pts: Tripković 21	Arena: Krešimir Ćosić Hall

21 January 2009 18	Partizan Belgrade (Serbia)	81–64	(Croatia) Zagreb	Belgrade
	Scoring by quarter: 28-17, 22-12, 9-20, 22-15
	Pts: Veličković 21	Report	Pts: Tomić 18	Arena: Pionir Hall

24 January 2009 19	Budućnost (Montenegro)	64–71	(Serbia) Partizan Belgrade	Podgorica
	Scoring by quarter: 15-24, 11-12, 19-11, 19-24
	Pts: Maraš 20	Report	Pts: Lasme 15	Arena: Morača Sports Center

1 February 2009 20	Partizan Belgrade (Serbia)	78–67	(Serbia) FMP	Belgrade
	Scoring by quarter: 25-15, 20-18, 18-17, 15-17
	Pts: Veličković 17	Report	Pts: Labović 13	Arena: Pionir Hall

7 February 2009 21	Crvena zvezda (Serbia)	82–85	(Serbia) Partizan Belgrade	Belgrade
	Scoring by quarter: 20-17, 21-21, 23-16, 18-31
	Pts: Marinović 17	Report	Pts: Veličković 20	Arena: Pionir Hall

14 February 2009 22	Partizan Belgrade (Serbia)	69–67	(Slovenia) Union Olimpija	Belgrade
	Scoring by quarter: 19-15, 14-23, 20-21, 16-8
	Pts: Lasme 15	Report	Pts: Ožbolt 20	Arena: Pionir Hall

28 February 2009 23	Vojvodina (Serbia)	73–77	(Serbia) Partizan Belgrade	Novi Sad
	Scoring by quarter: 14-20, 17-26, 20-21, 22-10
	Pts: Fisher 24	Report	Pts: Veselý 18	Arena: SPENS

7 March 2009 24	Partizan Belgrade (Serbia)	83–73	(Croatia) Split	Belgrade
	Scoring by quarter: 19-26, 18-14, 22-15, 24-18
	Pts: Veličković, Tripković 20	Report	Pts: Gordon 21	Arena: Pionir Hall

14 March 2009 25	Cibona (Croatia)	66–58	(Serbia) Partizan Belgrade	Zagreb
	Scoring by quarter: 22-17, 18-17, 12-17, 14-7
	Pts: Anderson 23	Report	Pts: Tepić 15	Arena: Dražen Petrović Basketball Hall

18 March 2009 26	Partizan Belgrade (Serbia)	86–75	(Bosnia and Herzegovina) Bosna ASA BHT	Belgrade
	Scoring by quarter: 14-19, 25-22, 26-17, 21-17
	Pts: Lasme 15	Report	Pts: Vučurović, Šehović, Đorđević 14	Arena: Pionir Hall

=== Final four ===
Semifinals; April 16
1	Partizan Belgrade	64
4	Crvena zvezda	58
2	Cibona	77
3	Hemofarm STADA	65

Final; April 18
1	Partizan Belgrade	63
2	Cibona	49

==== Semifinals ====
April 16
20:45 CET

Report

Partizan Belgrade (Serbia)	64–58	(Serbia) Crvena zvezda
Scoring by quarter: 13–11, 18–12, 15–15, 18–20
Pts: Tepić 14; Rebs: Veličković, Veselý, Vraneš 7 Asts: Tepić 4		Pts: Kikanović 15; Rebs: Roberts 8 Asts: Marković 4

Belgrade Arena, Belgrade
Attendance: 10,750
Referees: Muhvić (CRO), Jovčić (SRB), Herceg (CRO)

==== Final ====
April 18
20:45 CET

Report

Partizan Belgrade (Serbia)	63–49	(Croatia) Cibona
Scoring by quarter: 17–9, 21–18, 9–16, 16–6
Pts: Veličković 17; Rebs: Veličković 8 Asts: Tepić 5		Pts: Anderson 22; Rebs: Calloway 7 Asts: Anderson 4

Belgrade Arena, Belgrade
Attendance: 13,328
Referees: Pukl (SLO), Šutulović (MNE), Kolar (SLO)

== Kup Radivoja Koraća ==
Quarterfinals

18 February 2009	Partizan Belgrade	87–58	Vojvodina	Niš
18:00 CET	Scoring by quarter: 12–18, 32–14, 19–11, 26–15
	Pts: Veličković 17	Report	Pts: Bajić 19	Arena: Čair Sports Center

Semifinals

20 February 2009	Partizan Belgrade	83–67	Hemofarm STADA	Niš
20:30 CET	Scoring by quarter: 16–25, 23–11, 21–7, 23–24
	Pts: Veličković 20	Report	Pts: Božović 20	Arena: Čair Sports Center

Final

21 February 2009	Partizan Belgrade	80–65	Crvena zvezda	Niš
18:00 CET	Scoring by quarter: 21–19, 25–13, 15–17, 19–16
	Pts: Veličković 18	Report	Pts: Owens 15	Arena: Čair Sports Center

== Euroleague ==
=== Group D ===
	Team	Pld	W	L	PF	PA	Diff
1.	(Russia) CSKA Moscow	10	7	3	774	644	+130
2.	(Spain) Real Madrid	10	6	4	740	707	+33
3.	(Italy) Armani Jeans Milano	10	5	5	734	745	-11
4.	(Serbia) Partizan Belgrade	10	5	5	706	687	+19
5.	(Turkey) Efes Pilsen	10	4	6	713	762	-49
6.	(Greece) Panionios Forthnet	10	3	7	668	790	-122

Win Loss

23 October 2008 1	Efes Pilsen (Turkey)	61–60	(Serbia) Partizan Belgrade	Istanbul
19:15	Scoring by quarter: 11–14, 24–10, 14–13, 12–23
	Pts: Vujanić 17; Rebs: Gönlüm 6 Asts: Vujanić 7	Report	Pts: Veličković 16; Rebs: Lasme 14; Asts: Milošević 3	Arena: Abdi İpekçi Arena; Attendance: 3,000; Referees: Facchini, Fabio (ITA), Christodoulou, Christos (GRE), Perea, Oscar (ESP)

29 October 2008 2	Partizan Belgrade (Serbia)	81–77	(Spain) Real Madrid	Belgrade
20:45	Scoring by quarter: 21–13, 23–25, 13–21, 24–18
	Pts: Rašić 17; Rebs: Veličković 6 Asts: Tepić 5	Report	Pts: Llull 19; Rebs: Hosley 8 Asts: Mumbrú 2	Arena: Pionir Hall; Attendance: 6,128; Referees: Pitsilkas, Nikolaos (GRE), Cerebuch, Guerrino (ITA), Paternico, Carmelo (ITA)

5 November 2008 3	Partizan Belgrade (Serbia)	81–76	(Italy) Armani Jeans Milano	Belgrade
19:15	Scoring by quarter: 15–28, 23–27, 28–12, 15–9
	Pts: Veličković 14; Rebs: Lasme 10; Asts: Tepić 8	Report	Pts: Thomas 27; Rebs: Hall 5 Asts: Hawkins 4	Arena: Pionir Hall; Attendance: 6,253; Referees: Ziemblicki, Grzegorz (POL), Conde, Antonio (ESP), Koromilas, Elias (GRE)

13 November 2008 4	Panionios Forthnet (Greece)	72–67	(Serbia) Partizan Belgrade	Athens
19:45	Scoring by quarter: 19–10, 21–25, 16–12, 16–20
	Pts: Miles 18; Rebs: Cvetković, Miles, Baxter 5 Asts: Miles 4	Report	Pts: Tepić 19; Rebs: Lasme 9 Asts: Tepić 5	Arena: Makis Liougas Hall; Attendance: 2,300; Referees: Brazauskas, Romualdas (LTU), Zamojski, Jakub (POL), Pozzana, Mauro (ITA)

26 November 2008 5	Partizan Belgrade (Serbia)	62–63	(Russia) CSKA Moscow	Belgrade
20:45	Scoring by quarter: 17–19, 13–15, 22–18, 10–11
	Pts: Tepić 14; Rebs: Veselý 9 Asts: Milošević, Tepić, Rašić, Veličković 2	Report	Pts: Planinić, Lorbek 11; Rebs: Morris 7 Asts: Zisis, Planinić 3	Arena: Pionir Hall; Attendance: 6,683; Referees: Arteaga, Juan Carlos (ESP), Garcia Gonzalez, Juan Carlos (ESP), Chambon, David (FRA)

3 December 2008 6	Partizan Belgrade (Serbia)	83–77	(Turkey) Efes Pilsen	Belgrade
20:45	Scoring by quarter: 21–14, 19–22, 21–15, 22–26
	Pts: Rašić 18; Rebs: Veličković 9 Asts: Tepić 4	Report	Pts: Gönlüm 14; Rebs: Gönlüm 11; Asts: Hammonds, Gönlüm, Smith, Thornton 2	Arena: Pionir Hall; Attendance: 6,912; Referees: Zavlanos, Nikolaos (GRE), Facchini, Fabio (ITA), Perez Pizzaro, Emilio (ESP)

11 December 2008 7	Real Madrid (Spain)	68–67	(Serbia) Partizan Belgrade	Madrid
20:45	Scoring by quarter: 24–9, 12–15, 16–25, 16–18
	Pts: Reyes 15; Rebs: Reyes 9 Asts: Sánchez 3	Report	Pts: Tripković 22; Rebs: Lasme 5 Asts: Tepić 5	Arena: Palacio Vistalegre; Attendance: 6,100; Referees: Voreadis, Lazaros (GRE), Ryzhyk, Borys (UKR), Lefwerth, Oscar (SWE)

17 December 2008 8	Armani Jeans Milano (Italy)	73–59	(Serbia) Partizan Belgrade	Milan
21:00	Scoring by quarter: 26–16, 15–18, 16–6, 16–19
	Pts: Vitali, Thomas 14; Rebs: Rocca, Katelynas 9 Asts: Hawkins, Vitali, Sangaré 2	Report	Pts: Tepić 19; Rebs: Lasme 7 Asts: Veličković 2	Arena: Mediolanum Forum; Attendance: 2,830; Referees: Pukl, Sasa (SLO), Gkontas, Spiros (GRE), Bulto, Vicente (ESP)

7 January 2009 9	Partizan Belgrade (Serbia)	80–57	(Greece) Panionios Forthnet	Belgrade
20:45	Scoring by quarter: 30–9, 14–24, 15–9, 21–15
	Pts: Veselý 19; Rebs: Vraneš 13; Asts: Veličković 7	Report	Pts: Miles 14; Rebs: Miles 5 Asts: Miles 5	Arena: Pionir Hall; Attendance: 6,520; Referees: Bachar, Shmuel (ISR), Drabikovsky, Volodymr (UKR), Chiari, Roberto (ITA)

14 January 2009 10	CSKA Moscow (Russia)	63–66	(Serbia) Partizan Belgrade	Moscow
21:30	Scoring by quarter: 14–18, 15–12, 16–13, 18–23
	Pts: Lorbek 23; Rebs: Lorbek 9 Asts: Holden, Smodiš 3	Report	Pts: Rašić, Tepić 13; Rebs: Vraneš 11; Asts: Rašić 5	Arena: USH CSKA; Attendance: 3,500; Referees: Pitsilkas, Nikolaos (GRE), Rocha, Fernando (POR), Maestre, Nicola (FRA)

=== Group G ===
	Team	Pld	W	L	PF	PA	Diff
1.	(Greece) Panathinaikos	6	5	1	503	428	+72
2.	(Serbia) Partizan	6	4	2	420	434	-14
3.	(Spain) Unicaja Málaga	6	2	4	484	461	+23
4.	(Italy) Lottomatica Roma	6	1	5	441	525	-84

Win Loss

29 January 2009 1	Panathinaikos (Greece)	81–63	(Serbia) Partizan Belgrade	Athens
20:45	Scoring by quarter: 22–23, 14–18, 19–11, 26–11
	Pts: Peković 26; Rebs: Peković, Batiste 6 Asts: Spanoulis, Diamantidis 3	Report	Pts: Veličković 13; Rebs: Lasme, Vraneš, Veselý 5 Asts: Veselý, Tepić, Rašić, Veličković, Tripković 3	Arena: Nikos Galis Olympic Indoor Hall; Attendance: 10,000; Referees: Jungebrand, Carl (FIN), Ankarali, Recep (TUR), Paternico, Carmelo (ITA)

4 February 2009 2	Partizan Belgrade (Serbia)	84–76	(Italy) Lottomatica Roma	Belgrade
20:45	Scoring by quarter: 27–16, 23–26, 18–15, 16–19
	Pts: Tripković 20; Rebs: Veličković 10; Asts: Tepić, Rašić 4	Report	Pts: Brezec 19; Rebs: Hutson 6 Asts: Jaaber 5	Arena: Pionir Hall; Attendance: 6,925; Referees: Martin, Jose (ESP), Spiridonos, Leonidas (GRE), Zamojski, Jakub (POL)

11 February 2009 3	Partizan Belgrade (Serbia)	60–59	(Spain) Unicaja Málaga	Belgrade
20:45	Scoring by quarter: 10–11, 16–15, 18–15, 16–18
	Pts: Tripković, Veličković 12; Rebs: Lasme 9 Asts: Tepić, Veličković 2	Report	Pts: Cook, Welsch 12; Rebs: Haislip 7 Asts: Gomis, Cook 3	Arena: Pionir Hall; Attendance: 6,953; Referees: Lamonica, Luigi (ITA), Ziemblicki, Grzegorz (POL), Rocha, Fernando (POR)

25 February 2009 4	Unicaja Málaga (Spain)	74–78(OT)	(Serbia) Partizan Belgrade	Málaga
20:45	Scoring by quarter: 17–18, 22–17, 19–16, 7–14, Overtime: 13–19
	Pts: N'Dong 14; Rebs: N'Dong 8 Asts: Cook 8	Report	Pts: Lasme 20; Rebs: Lasme 8 Asts: Tepić, Rašić 6	Arena: Martín Carpena; Attendance: 9,450; Referees: Zavlanos, Nikolaos (GRE), Ryzhyk, Borys (UKR), Viator, Eddie (FRA)

5 March 2009 5	Partizan Belgrade (Serbia)	63–56	(Greece) Panathinaikos	Belgrade
20:45	Scoring by quarter: 12–13, 14–16, 15–11, 22–16
	Pts: Tripković, Lasme 12; Rebs: Rakočević 8 Asts: Tepić 4	Report	Pts: Diamantidis 21; Rebs: Fotsis 8 Asts: Perperoglou 2	Arena: Kombank Arena; Attendance: 22,567; Referees: Facchini, Fabio (ITA), Garcia Ortiz, Jose Ramon (ESP), Chambon, David (FRA)

11 March 2009 6	Lottomatica Roma (Italy)	88–72	(Serbia) Partizan Belgrade	Rome
20:00	Scoring by quarter: 26–23, 23–11, 18–18, 21–20
	Pts: Hutson 23; Rebs: Jaaber, Gigli 5 Asts: Jennings 6	Report	Pts: Lasme 17; Rebs: Lasme 8 Asts: Tepić, Rakočević 2	Arena: PalaLottomatica; Attendance: 2,715; Referees: Martin, Jose (ESP), Dozai, Srdjan (CRO), Conde, Antonio (ESP)

==== Quarterfinals ====
Win Loss

24 March 2009 Quarterfinals game 1	CSKA Moscow (Russia)	56–47 (Series: 1–0)	(Serbia) Partizan Belgrade	Moscow
20:15	Scoring by quarter: 13–3, 17–17, 13–11, 13–16
	Pts: Lorbek 16; Rebs: Khryapa 10; Asts: Khryapa 4	Report	Pts: Tripković 12; Rebs: Lasme, Veličković, Rašić 5 Asts: Tepić 3	Arena: USH CSKA; Attendance: 4,600; Referees: Koukoulekidis, Stelios (GRE), Hierrezuelo, Daniel (ESP), Chambon, David (FRA)

26 March 2009 Quarterfinals game 2	CSKA Moscow (Russia)	77–50 (Series: 2–0)	(Serbia) Partizan Belgrade	Moscow
20:15	Scoring by quarter: 21–6, 22–16, 18–12, 16–16
	Pts: Lorbek 21; Rebs: Lorbek 7 Asts: Lorbek, Langdon 2	Report	Pts: Lasme 15; Rebs: Lasme 5 Asts: Tepić, Tripković, Lasme, Božić 2	Arena: USH CSKA; Attendance: 4,500; Referees: Zavlanos, Nikolaos (GRE), Facchini, Fabio (ITA), Zamojski, Jakub (POL)

31 March 2009 Quarterfinals game 3	Partizan Belgrade (Serbia)	56–67 (Series: 0–3)	(Russia) CSKA Moscow	Belgrade
20:45	Scoring by quarter: 14–15, 14–18, 10–19, 18–15
	Pts: Veličković 26; Rebs: Lasme 8 Asts: Veličković 4	Report	Pts: Šiškauskas 20; Rebs: Smodiš 7 Asts: Lorbek 4	Arena: Kombank Arena; Attendance: 21,352; Referees: Voreadis, Lazaros (GRE), Martin, Jose (ESP), Koromlias, Elias (GRE)

== Individual awards ==
Euroleague

EuroLeague Rising Star

- (Serbia) Novica Veličković

Coach of the Year (Alexander Gomelsky Award)

- (Serbia) Duško Vujošević

Euroleague MVP of the Month

- (Serbia) Novica Veličković, February

Euroleague Weekly MVPs

- (Serbia) Novica Veličković – TOP 16, Week 2

Adriatic League

MVP of the Round

- (Serbia) Novica Veličković – Round 14
- (Serbia) Novica Veličković – Final

Radivoj Korać Cup

Finals MVP

- (Serbia) Novica Veličković

Basketball League of Serbia

Finals MVP

- (Serbia) Novica Veličković
