= Serbia men's national under-18 basketball team =

Youth basketball team representing Serbia

Serbia
- FIBA zone: FIBA Europe
- National federation: Basketball Federation of Serbia

U18 EuroBasket
- Appearances: 23
- Medals: Gold: 6 (2005, 2007, 2009, 2017, 2018, 2023); Silver: 3 (2011, 2014, 2024); Bronze: 3 (1996, 2012, 2022)

Serbia men's national under-18 basketball team
Medal record

FIBA U18 EuroBasket

Representing FR Yugoslavia
Bronze medal – third place	1996 Auch, Lourdes, Tarbes	

Representing Serbia and Montenegro
Gold medal – first place	2005 Belgrade	

Representing Serbia
Gold medal – first place	2007 Madrid	
Gold medal – first place	2009 Metz	
Gold medal – first place	2017 Bratislava	
Gold medal – first place	2018 Riga, Ventspils, Liepaja	
Gold medal – first place	2023 Niš	
Silver medal – second place	2011 Wroclaw	
Silver medal – second place	2014 Konya	
Silver medal – second place	2024 Tampere	
Bronze medal – third place	2012 Vilnius, Liepaja	

The Serbia men's national under-18 basketball team (Serbian Cyrillic: Кошаркашка репрезентација Србије до 18 година) is the boys' basketball team, administered by Basketball Federation of Serbia, that represents Serbia in international under-18 men's basketball competitions, consisting mainly of the FIBA U18 EuroBasket.

The national team played as FR Yugoslavia from 1993 to 2003, and as Serbia and Montenegro from 2004 to 2006.

== History ==
=== 1992–2006: Serbia and Montenegro ===
After the dissolution of SFR Yugoslavia, the team as suspended from the 1992 and 1994 European Championships because of international sanctions. It first played at the 1996 championship in France and won bronze, with Vladimir Vidačić as the tournament's top scorer. The team finished fifth in 2000 and again in 2004. In 2005 Servia and Montenegro won its first title at home in Belgrade, un beaten at 8-0 under head coach Stevan Karadžić. Dragan Labović was named MVP, and the roster included Miloš Teodosić, Milenko Tepić and Miroslav Raduljica. The team finished fifth again in 2006, its last tournament before Montenegro became independent.

=== 2007 onwards: Serbia ===
In its first tournament in Serbia, the team won gold in Madrid in 2007. It won again in Metz in 2009, which made it one of Europe's most consistent youth programmes. From 2011 to 2014 it reached podium 3 times:

- Silver in 2011 and 2014
- Bronze in 2012

After finishing outside the medals in 2015 and 2016, Serbia won back-to-back titles in 2017 and 2018. Nikola Mišković was MVP in 2017 and Marko Pecarski in 2018. The team dropped to tenth in 2019. The 2020 championship was cancelled because of the COVID-19 pandemic, and in 2021 team played in the FIBA U18 European Challengers instead. Serbia Won bronze in 2022, then a sixth title at home in Niš in 2023, again unbeaten, with Nikola Topić as MVP. A silver medal in Tampere followed in 2024. The team came 5th in 2025 and 9th in 2029

== Individual awards ==
- Most Valuable Player
  - Dragan Labović – 2005
  - Nikola Mišković – 2017
  - Marko Pecarski – 2018
  - Nikola Topić – 2023
- All-Tournament Team
  - Dejan Musli – 2009
  - Nikola Silađi – 2010
  - Nenad Miljenović – 2011
  - Vasilije Micić – 2011
  - Nikola Janković – 2012
  - Nikola Radičević – 2012
  - Stefan Lazarević – 2014
  - Nikola Mišković – 2017
  - Marko Pecarski – 2018
  - Filip Petrušev – 2018
  - Ilija Milijašević – 2022
  - Nikola Topić – 2023
  - Bogoljub Marković – 2023
- Statistical leaders: Points
  - Vladimir Vidačić – 1996
  - Marko Pecarski – 2018
- Statistical leaders: Rebounds
  - Marko Pecarski – 2018
- Statistical leaders: Assists
  - Vojislav Stojanović – 2015

== Competitive record ==
=== Representing FR Yugoslavia / Serbia and Montenegro ===
Year	Pos.	GP	W	L	Ref.
1964–1990	Part of SFR Yugoslavia				
As (Federal Republic of Yugoslavia) FR Yugoslavia
(Hungary) 1992	Suspended				
(Israel) 1994	Suspended				
(France) 1996	3rd place, bronze medalist(s)	7	4	3	
(Bulgaria) 1998	Did not qualify				
(Croatia) 2000	5th	8	6	2	
(Germany) 2002	Did not qualify				
As Serbia and Montenegro
(Spain) 2004	5th	8	5	3	
(Serbia and Montenegro) 2005	1st place, gold medalist(s)	8	8	0	
(Greece) 2006	5th	8	6	2	
Total	5/9	39	29	10	

=== Representing Serbia ===
Year	Pos.	GP	W	L	Ref.
(Spain) 2007	1st place, gold medalist(s)	8	7	1	
(Greece) 2008	6th	8	4	4	
(France) 2009	1st place, gold medalist(s)	9	7	2	
(Lithuania) 2010	4th	9	5	4	
(Poland) 2011	2nd place, silver medalist(s)	9	6	3	
(Lithuania) (Latvia) 2012	3rd place, bronze medalist(s)	9	6	3	
(Latvia) 2013	6th	9	5	4	
(Turkey) 2014	2nd place, silver medalist(s)	9	7	2	
(Greece) 2015	5th	9	6	3	
(Turkey) 2016	10th	6	3	3	
(Slovakia) 2017	1st place, gold medalist(s)	7	6	1	
(Latvia) 2018	1st place, gold medalist(s)	7	6	1	
(Greece) 2019	10th	7	4	3	
(Turkey) 2022	3rd place, bronze medalist(s)	7	6	1	
(Serbia) 2023	1st place, gold medalist(s)	7	7	0	
(Finland) 2024	2nd place, silver medalist(s)	7	6	1	
(Serbia) 2025	5th	7	5	2	
(Italy) 2026	9th	7	5	2	
Total	18/18	141	101	40	

== Coaches ==
=== FR Yugoslavia / Serbia and Montenegro ===
Years	Head coach	Assistant coach(es)
1996		Ivan Jeremić
1998	Nenad Trajković	
2000	Zlatan Tomić	Nebojša Raičević, Oliver Vidin
2002		
2004	Miodrag Kadija	Miloš Kovač
2005	Stevan Karadžić	Igor Polenek
2006	Jovica Arsić	

=== Serbia ===
Years	Head coach	Assistant coach(es)
2007	Dejan Mijatović	Oliver Vidin, Aleksandar Matović
2008	Miroslav Nikolić	Branko Maksimović, Ivan Smiljanić
2009–2010	Vlada Jovanović	Jovan Popović, Vladimir Zlatanović, Miloš Gligorijević^{2010}
2011	Marko Ičelić	Miloš Obrenović, Nikola Marković
2012	Dejan Mijatović	Đorđe Adžić, Marko Barać
2013–2014	Aleksandar Bućan	Marko Simonović, Aleksandar Bjelić, Tomislav Tomović^{2014}, Bojan Salatić^{2013}
2015	Slobodan Klipa	Ivan Smiljanić, Aleksandar Glišić, Miodrag Dinić
2016	Milan Gurović	Vladimir Jovanović, Mihailo Sušić
2017	Vlada Jovanović	Đorđe Novučić, Vladimir Zlatanović, Dušan Stojkov
2018	Aleksandar Bućan	(Bosnia and Herzegovina) Žarko Milaković, Bojan Salatić
2019	Slobodan Klipa	Miodrag Dinić, Zoran Vraneš, Miloš Isakov Kovačević
2021–2022	Vladimir Đokić	Stevan Mijović, Mihailo Šušić, Saša Đorđević
2023	Nenad Stefanović	Vasilj Đurić, Marko Dimitrijević

== Past rosters ==
=== Representing FY Yugoslavia / Serbia and Montenegro ===
1996 Championship	2000 Championship	2004 Championship	2005 Championship	2006 Championship
Nebojša Šarenac; Jovan Zdravković; Marko Ugrčić; Igor Rakočević; Dimitrije Matić; Ratko Varda; Siniša Kovačević; Vladimir Vidačić; Stevan Nađfeji; Robert Šarović; Boban Savović; Nikola Dačević	Milutin Aleksić; Blagota Sekulić; Vladimir Popović; Aleksandar Gajić; Marko Jovanović; Jovan Koprivica; Dušan Đorđević; Nemanja Matović; Bojan Bakić; Nikola Otašević; Aleksandar Jevdić; Miloš Pavlović	Uroš Tripković; Milenko Tepić; Stefan Ivanović; Srđan Živković; Dragan Labović; Nenad Mijatović; Uroš Duvnjak; Miljan Rakić; Nemanja Aleksandrov; Vladimir Golubović; Ivan Maraš; Tadija Dragićević	Miloš Teodosić; Milenko Tepić; Ivan Paunić; Marko Djurković; Dragan Labović; Nenad Mijatović; Branko Jereminov; Darko Vukomanović; Vladimir Štimac; Miroslav Raduljica; Nikola Dragović; Vladimir Dašić	Darko Kastratović; Petar Despotović; Slobodan Dunđerski; Stefan Marković; Mladen Jeremić; Aleksandar Radulović; Nikola Koprivica; Bojan Radetić; Milan Mačvan; Miroslav Raduljica; Boban Marjanović; Vladimir Dašić

=== Representing Serbia ===
2007 Championship	2008 Championship	2009 Championship	2010 Championship	2011 Championship	2012 Championship
Filip Čović; Stevan Tapušković; Stefan Živanović; Branko Lazić; Dušan Katnić; Darko Vukomanovic; Stefan Stojačić; Dušan Cvetković; Nikola Maravić; Ivan Smiljanić; Nikola Marković; Milan Mačvan	Uroš Petrović; Filip Šepa; Bogdan Riznić; Bojan Subotić; Andreja Milutinović; Aleksandar Mitrović; Aleksandar Vlahović; Nikola Vukasović; Svetozar Stamenković; Nenad Grujo; Dušan Ognjenović; Dejan Musli	Nemanja Jaramaz; Aleksandar Ponjavić; Petar Torlak; Miloš Tripković; Nikola Vukasović; Milić Blagojević; Danilo Anđušić; Lazar Radosavljević; Nemanja Bešović; Nikola Rondović; Branislav Đekić; Dejan Musli	Vukašin Petković; Bogić Vujošević; Petar Lambić; Stefan Nastić; Bogdan Bogdanović; Luka Igrutinović; Marko Luković; Marko Gujančić; Božo Đumić; Đorđe Drenovac; Nikola Silađi; Nemanja Bešović	Nikola Radičević; Nemanja Dangubić; Vasilije Micić; Stefan Popovski-Turanjanin; Saša Avramović; Luka Mitrović; Nenad Miljenović; Nemanja Krstić; Nikola Janković; Đorđe Milošević; Nemanja Bezbradica; Nemanja Mišković	Nikola Radičević; Stefan Pot; Brano Đukanović; Nikola Rebić; Nikola Čvorović; Dušan Kutlešić; Luka Anđušić; Miloš Janković; Nikola Janković; Mihajlo Andrić; Dušan Ristić; Đoko Šalić

2013 Championship	2014 Championship	2015 Championship	2016 Championship	2017 Championship	2018 Championship
Ognjen Jaramaz; Rade Zagorac; Vasilije Pušica; Aleksa Jugović; Dragan Apić; Božidar Babović; Brano Đukanović; Milenko Veljković; Aleksandar Bursać; Stefan Ljubenković; Vasilije Vučetić; Dejan Davidovac	Stefan Peno; Stefan Simić; Uroš Čarapić; Danilo Ostojić; Radovan Đoković; Vanja Marinković; Ilija Đoković; Stefan Lazarević; Nikola Pavlović; Marko Radovanović; Vasilije Vučetić; Vuk Karadžić	Đorđe Dimitrijević; Nikola Ćirković; Aleksandar Aranitović; Slobodan Jovanović; Miloš Glišić; Vojislav Stojanović; Aleksa Radanov; Nikola Popović; Dimitrije Spasojević; Stefan Kenić; Boriša Simanić; David Miladinović	4 Stefan Đorđević; 5 Aleksa Uskoković; 6 Stefan Momirov; 7 Nikola Mišković; 8 Dušan Beslać; 9 Novak Musić; 10 Aleksa Radanov; 12 Boriša Simanić; 13 Miloš Glišić; 15 Aleksa Stepanović; 21 Lazar Nikolić; 22 Ranko Simović	1 Nikola Mišković; 3 Balša Koprivica; 4 Stefan Momirov; 5 Aleksa Uskoković; 7 Vuk Vulikić; 8 Filip Petrušev; 9 Andrija Marjanović; 10 Tadija Tadić; 12 Danilo Petrović; 15 Marko Pecarski; 17 Marko Šarenac; 24 Aleksa Matić	3 Filip Petrušev; 7 Altin Islamović; 8 Bogdan Nedeljković; 9 Bogdan Rutešić; 11 Zoran Paunović; 12 Uroš Trifunović; 14 Toma Vasiljević; 15 Marko Pecarski; 19 Arijan Lakić; 22 Dalibor Ilić; 31 Luka Cerovina; 33 Pavle Kuzmanović

2019 Championship	2021 Challengers	2022 Championship	2023 Championship	2024 Championship
1 Vukašin Mašić; 2 Aleksej Pokuševski; 3 Marko Andrić; 5 Marko Pavićević; 6 Stevan Karapandžić; 7 Đorđe Pažin; 8 Nikola Manojlović; 9 Đorđe Đorđević; 10 Lazar Vasić; 11 Aleksandar Langović; 13 Aleksa Marković; 27 Filip Škobalj	0 Aleksa Milenković; 3 Luka Vudragović; 4 Đorđe Ćurčić; 5 Ilija Milijašević; 6 Filip Radaković; 8 Jovan Ristić; 9 Marko Krstić; 10 Sergej Jeremić; 14 Pavle Stošić; 15 Stefan Janković; 17 Lazar Đoković; 33 Andrija Radojević	0 Aleksa Milenković; 3 Luka Andrić; 4 Đorđe Ćurčić; 5 Ilija Milijašević; 6 Filip Radaković; 7 Aleksa Milošević; 8 Jovan Ristić; 10 Marko Šarenac; 13 Aleksa Čovičković; 17 Lazar Đoković; 23 Nikola Đapa; 31 Matija Milošević	1 Aleksa Ristić; 3 Andrej Kostić; 6 Bogoljub Marković; 7 Andrej Mušicki; 8 Mitar Bošnjaković; 9 Pavle Nikolić; 11 Đorđe Ćurčić; 13 Ognjen Romić; 31 Matija Milošević; 33 Pavle Mišić; 34 Filip Jović; 44 Nikola Topić	1 Aleksandar Vojinović; 2 Marko Tofoski; 5 Savo Drezgić; 7 Ognjen Srzentić; 8 Mitar Bošnjaković; 9 Aleksa Stanojević; 10 Miloš Šojić; 11 Luka Marković; 12 Luka Jovanović; 15 Stefan Plisnić; 27 Aleksa Dimitrijević; 47 Andrej Kostić

== See also ==
- Serbia men's national under-18 3x3 team
- Serbian men's university basketball team
- Serbia men's national under-20 basketball team
- Serbia men's national under-19 basketball team
- Serbia men's national under-17 basketball team
- Serbia men's national under-16 basketball team
