= 2014–15 BIBL season =

2014–15 BIBL
- Season: 2014–15
- Teams: 10

Finals
- Champions: (Kosovo) KB Prishtina
- Runners-up: (Bulgaria) Rilski Sportist

In the seventh season of the Balkan International Basketball League, ten participants from Albania, Bulgaria, Kosovo, the Republic of Macedonia, Montenegro and Romania has competed.

== Teams ==
Country	Teams	Teams		
Montenegro	3	Mornar	Sutjeska	Teodo
Kosovo	2	Peja	Sigal Prishtina	
(North Macedonia) Macedonia	2	Kumanovo	Kožuv	
Albania	1	Vllaznia		
Bulgaria	1	Rilski Sportist		
Romania	1	SCM Craiova		

== Format ==
In the first round the teams were divided into two groups, each containing five teams. Each team played every other team in its group at home and away. The top four teams from each group advanced to the second round. The teams that finished fifth in their group end their participation.

The eight remaining teams are again separated into two groups with four teams each. The teams that already have played during the first round kept the results between them from the first stage and played with the two remaining teams from the other group home and away games. The winners of both groups advanced directly to the semifinals, while the second- and third-placed met in the quarterfinal in home and away elimination games.

The winners of the groups from the second round met against the winners of the third round in two semifinals, played again in home and away elimination games. The winners of those advanced to the final, decided on home and away games.

== First round ==
The games were played between 14 October 2014 and 28 January 2015.

=== Group A ===
	Team	Pld	W	L	PF	PA	Diff	Pts
1.	(North Macedonia) Kumanovo	8	5	3	688	687	+1	13
2.	(Bulgaria) Rilski Sportist	8	4	4	691	686	+5	12
3.	(Montenegro) Sutjeska	8	4	4	641	644	−3	12
4.	(Kosovo) Peja	8	4	4	685	666	+19	12
5.	(Montenegro) Teodo	8	3	5	612	634	−22	11

	KUM	PEJ	RIL	SUT	TEO
(North Macedonia) Kumanovo		83–93	89–82	97–87	76–93
(Kosovo) Peja	89–88		91–93	83–64	77–69
(Bulgaria) Rilski Sportist	90–95	105–97		78–68	83–81
(Montenegro) Sutjeska	83–86	86–84	81–79		82–55
(Montenegro) Teodo	70–74	78–71	84–81	82–90	

=== Group B ===
	Team	Pld	W	L	PF	PA	Diff	Pts
1.	(North Macedonia) Kožuv	8	8	0	707	556	+151	16
2.	(Romania) SCM Craiova	8	4	4	641	606	+35	12
3.	(Montenegro) Mornar	8	4	4	564	542	+22	12
4.	(Kosovo) KB Prishtina	8	4	4	690	691	−1	12
5.	(Albania) Vllaznia	8	0	8	413	620	−207	8

	CRA	KOZ	MOR	PRI	VLL
(Romania) SCM Craiova		84–87	75–63	101–82	86–45
(North Macedonia) Kožuv	80–63		85–66	93–78	99–59
(Montenegro) Mornar	85–81	67–75		80–87	79–48
(Kosovo) KB Prishtina	92–76	87–100	91–104		85–59
(Albania) Vllaznia	72–75	52–88	0–20	78–88	

Notes

1. Vllaznia lost the game on forfait due to issues with the technical equipment, as neither the game clock nor the 24’’ device were functioning.

== Second round ==
The games were played between 3 February and 4 March 2015.

Key to colors
Advances to Semifinal
Advances to Quarterfinal

=== Group C ===
	Team	Pld	W	L	PF	PA	Diff	Pts
1.	(Kosovo) Peja	6	4	2	476	480	−4	10
2.	(North Macedonia) Kumanovo	6	4	2	507	505	+2	10
3.	(Romania) SCM Craiova	6	3	3	473	439	+34	9
4.	(Montenegro) Mornar	6	1	5	463	495	–32	7

	CRA	KUM	MOR	PEJ
(Romania) SCM Craiova		74–75	75–63	97–75
(North Macedonia) Kumanovo	81–79		92–84	83–93
(Montenegro) Mornar	85–81	86–88		65–72
(Kosovo) Peja	60–67	89–88	87–80	

=== Group D ===
	Team	Pld	W	L	PF	PA	Diff	Pts
1.	(North Macedonia) Kožuv	6	4	2	498	475	+23	10
2.	(Kosovo) KB Prishtina	6	4	2	472	427	+45	10
3.	(Bulgaria) Rilski Sportist	6	2	4	459	497	−38	8
4.	(Montenegro) Sutjeska	6	2	4	391	421	−30	8

	KOZ	RIL	PRI	SUT
(North Macedonia) Kožuv		72–74	93–78	79–76
(Bulgaria) Rilski Sportist	86–88		71–94	78–68
(Kosovo) KB Prishtina	87–100	94–71		99–92
(Montenegro) Sutjeska	74–66	81–79	0–20	

Notes

1. Sutjeska lost the game on forfeit after the game was abandoned after 6 minutes of play due to riots from the home fans, which injured two of KB Prishtina players, the head coach, the team manager and one member from the team staff.

== Quarterfinal ==
The quarterfinals are two-legged ties determined on aggregate score. The first leg was played on 10 and 11 March 2015, while the second leg was on 24 and 25 March 2015.

Team #1	Agg.	Team #2	1st leg	2nd leg
Rilski Sportist (Bulgaria)	198–192	(North Macedonia) Kumanovo	97−85	101−107
SCM Craiova (Romania)	143–175	(Kosovo) KB Prishtina	73−77	70−98

== Semifinal ==
31 March 2015
18:30

Report

Rilski Sportist (Bulgaria)	62–63	(Kosovo) Peja
Scoring by quarter: 24−16, 15−11, 10−20, 13−16
Pts: Bozov 13; Rebs: Rakočević 10; Asts: Bozov 5		Pts: Brkić 14; Rebs: Brkić 13; Asts: Wise 7

Universiada Hall, Sofia
Referees: Marius Ciulin, Aleksandar Milojevik, Bogdan Podar

7 April 2015
19:30

Report

Peja (Kosovo)	66–82	(Bulgaria) Rilski Sportist
Scoring by quarter: 16−19, 19−21, 16−26, 15−16
Pts: Wise 17; Rebs: Hajrizi 8 Asts: Wise 9		Pts: Rakočević 22; Rebs: Rakočević 11; Asts: Rakočević 5

Karagaci, Pejë
Referees: Ademir Zurapović, Haris Bijedić, Georgios Poursanidis

Rilski Sportist won 144−129 on aggregate

1 April 2015
19:30

Report

KB Prishtina (Kosovo)	85–61	(North Macedonia) Kožuv
Scoring by quarter: 24−12, 17−13, 29−14, 15−22
Pts: Bavčić 25; Rebs: Bavčić 12; Asts: Berisha 6		Pts: Nešović, Šepa 11; Rebs: Gocevski 7 Asts: Šepa 4

Pallati i Rinisë dhe Sporteve, Pristina
Referees: Zdravko Rutešić, Radomir Vojinović, Ivan Miličević

8 April 2015
19:30

Report

Kožuv (North Macedonia)	86–80	(Kosovo) KB Prishtina
Scoring by quarter: 25−26, 22−19, 26−21, 13−14
Pts: Nešović 18; Rebs: Janjušević 7 Asts: Brčkov 4		Pts: Berisha 22; Rebs: Trajkovski 11; Asts: Berisha 4

26th April Hall, Gevgelija
Referees: Igor Dragojević, Ognjen Jokić, Ventsislav Velikov

KB Prishtina won 165−147 on aggregate

== Final ==
21 April 2015
18:30

Report

KB Prishtina (Kosovo)	74–72	(Bulgaria) Rilski Sportist
Scoring by quarter: 21−27, 17−16, 17−13, 19−16
Pts: Bavčić 23; Rebs: Trajkovski 11; Asts: Hulls 5		Pts: Rakočević 21; Rebs: Gugino 10; Asts: Norfleet 7

Pallati i Rinisë dhe Sporteve, Pristina
Attendance: 2,500
Referees: Marius Ciulin, Igor Dragojević, Zdravko Rutesić

29 April 2015
19:30

Report

Rilski Sportist (Bulgaria)	71–80	(Kosovo) KB Prishtina
Scoring by quarter: 26−22, 10−16, 16−19, 19−23
Pts: Gugino 25; Rebs: Gugino 9 Asts: Bozov 9		Pts: Hulls 22; Rebs: Berisha, Trajkovski 8 Asts: Berisha 5
KB Prishtina won 154−143 on aggregate

Arena Samokov, Samokov
Attendance: 3,000
Referees: Ademir Zurapović, Ognjen Jokić, Haris Bijedić

2014–15 Balkan League Champions

KB Prishtina
1st Title
