= 2017–18 Junior ABA League =

Junior ABA League
- Season: 2017–18
- Dates: November 24–26, 2017 (Group stage); January 27–28, 2018 (Final Four)
- Games played: 24
- Teams: 10

Regular season
- Season MVP: (Georgia (country)) Goga Bitadze

Finals
- Champions: (Serbia) Mega Bemax U19 (1st title)
- Runners-up: (Serbia) Crvena zvezda U19
- Third place: (Bosnia and Herzegovina) Igokea U19
- Fourth place: (Montenegro) Budućnost VOLI U19
- All statistics correct as of January 28, 2018.

The 2017–18 Junior ABA League is the inaugural season of the Junior ABA League with ten men's under-19 teams from Serbia, Croatia, Slovenia, Montenegro, Bosnia and Herzegovina and the Republic of Macedonia participating in it. Teams are the junior selections of the 2017–18 ABA League First Division teams.

== Competition ==
Ten under-19 teams are participating at the 2017–18 Junior ABA League season – Budućnost VOLI, Cedevita, Cibona, Crvena zvezda mts, Igokea, Mega Bemax, Mornar, MZT Skopje Aerodrom, Partizan NIS and Petrol Olimpija - will be divided into two semi-final Groups.

In Group A in Belgrade, Serbia are Crvena zvezda mts, Cibona, Mega Bemax, Mornar and MZT Skopje Aerodrom. In Group B in Zagreb, Croatia are Budućnost VOLI, Cedevita, Igokea, Partizan NIS and Petrol Olimpija.

In the group stage, all teams will face each other team within a group in a round-robin system. The two best placed teams of each group will advance to the final tournament, which will take place in Laktaši. At the final tournament, the teams will play two games – the semifinal and the final or third place game. The winner of the final tournament will become the 2017–18 ABA Junior Tournament Champion.

== Teams ==
=== Team allocation ===
Regular season
(Serbia) Crvena zvezda mts U19	(Montenegro) Budućnost VOLI U19	(Croatia) Cedevita U19	(Bosnia and Herzegovina) Igokea U19
(Serbia) Partizan NIS U19	(Montenegro) Mornar U19	(Slovenia) Petrol Olimpija U19	
(Serbia) Mega Bemax U19	(Croatia) Cibona U19	(North Macedonia) MZT Skopje Aerodrom U19	

=== Locations and personnel ===
Location of teams in the 2017–18 Junior ABA League

Team	Home city	Head coach	Captain
Budućnost VOLI U19	Podgorica	(Montenegro) Petar Mijović	
Cedevita U19	Zagreb	(Croatia) Marko Trninić	
Cibona U19	Zagreb	(Croatia) Ante Samac	
Crvena zvezda mts U19	Belgrade	(Serbia) Bojan Đerić	(Serbia) Zoran Paunović
Igokea U19	Aleksandrovac	(Bosnia and Herzegovina) Žarko Milaković	(Serbia) Dalibor Ilić
Mega Bemax U19	Sremska Mitrovica	(Serbia) Vlada Vukoičić	(Serbia) Andrija Marjanović
Mornar U19	Bar	(Montenegro) Aleksandar Mitrović	
MZT Skopje Aerodrom U19	Skopje	(North Macedonia) Nebojša Đuković	
Partizan NIS U19	Belgrade	(Serbia) Aleksandar Bućan	(Serbia) Marko Pecarski
Petrol Olimpija U19	Ljubljana	(Slovenia) Lojze Šiško	

== Group stage ==
=== Group A ===
Venue: Basket City Hall, Belgrade, Serbia

Pos	Team	Pld	W	L	PF	PA	PD	Pts	Qualification
1	(Serbia) Crvena zvezda mts U19	4	4	0	376	273	+103	8	Advance to Final Four
2	(Serbia) Mega Bemax U19	4	3	1	358	265	+93	7	Advance to Final Four
3	(Croatia) Cibona U19	4	2	2	339	326	+13	6	
4	(North Macedonia) MZT Skopje Aerodrom U19	4	1	3	295	356	−61	5	
5	(Montenegro) Mornar U19	4	0	4	263	411	−148	4	

Source: Junior ABA League

24 November 2017 (Round 1)
Crvena zvezda mts U19 (Serbia)	74–60	(Serbia) Mega Bemax U19
Mornar U19 (Montenegro)	82–86	(North Macedonia) MZT Skopje Aerodrom U19
25 November 2017 (Round 2 and Round 3)
Crvena zvezda mts U19 (Serbia)	113–62	(Montenegro) Mornar U19
MZT Skopje Aerodrom U19 (North Macedonia)	66–91	(Croatia) Cibona U19
Mornar U19 (Montenegro)	46–117	(Serbia) Mega Bemax U19
Cibona U19 (Croatia)	75–94	(Serbia) Crvena zvezda mts U19
26 November 2017 (Round 4 and Round 5)
Mega Bemax U19 (Serbia)	88–67	(North Macedonia) MZT Skopje Aerodrom U19
Mornar U19 (Montenegro)	73–95	(Croatia) Cibona U19
MZT Skopje Aerodrom U19 (North Macedonia)	76–95	(Serbia) Crvena zvezda mts U19
Cibona U19 (Croatia)	78–93	(Serbia) Mega Bemax U19

=== Group B ===
Venue: Dom košarke Cedevita, Zagreb, Croatia

Pos	Team	Pld	W	L	PF	PA	PD	Pts	Qualification
1	(Bosnia and Herzegovina) Igokea U19	4	4	0	329	303	+26	8	Advance to Final Four
2	(Montenegro) Budućnost VOLI U19	4	2	2	318	327	−9	6	Advance to Final Four
3	(Croatia) Cedevita U19	4	2	2	357	317	+40	6	
4	(Serbia) Partizan NIS U19	4	1	3	313	327	−14	5	
5	(Slovenia) Petrol Olimpija U19	4	1	3	302	345	−43	5	

Source: Junior ABA League

24 November 2017 (Round 1)
Cedevita U19 (Croatia)	77–80	(Bosnia and Herzegovina) Igokea U19
Budućnost VOLI U19 (Montenegro)	65–87	(Serbia) Partizan NIS U19
25 November 2017 (Round 2 and Round 3)
Cedevita U19 (Croatia)	81–89	(Montenegro) Budućnost VOLI U19
Partizan NIS U19 (Serbia)	69–84	(Slovenia) Petrol Olimpija U19
Budućnost VOLI U19 (Montenegro)	75–80	(Bosnia and Herzegovina) Igokea U19
Petrol Olimpija U19 (Slovenia)	75–108	(Croatia) Cedevita U19
26 November 2017 (Round 4 and Round 5)
Igokea U19 (Bosnia and Herzegovina)	87–84	(Serbia) Partizan NIS U19
Budućnost VOLI U19 (Montenegro)	89–76	(Slovenia) Petrol Olimpija U19
Partizan NIS U19 (Serbia)	73–91	(Croatia) Cedevita U19
Igokea U19 (Bosnia and Herzegovina)	76–67	(Slovenia) Petrol Olimpija U19

== Final Four ==
Venue: Laktaši Sports Hall, Laktaši, Bosnia and Herzegovina

Semifinals
27 January
(Serbia) Crvena zvezda U19	63
(Montenegro) Budućnost VOLI U19	57
27 January
(Bosnia and Herzegovina) Igokea U19	70
(Serbia) Mega Bemax U19	73

Final
28 January
(Serbia) Crvena zvezda U19	60
(Serbia) Mega Bemax U19	82
Third place
28 January
(Montenegro) Budućnost VOLI U19	74
(Bosnia and Herzegovina) Igokea U19	77

Source: Junior Adriatic League

=== Semifinals ===
==== Crvena zvezda U19 v Budućnost VOLI U19 ====
27 January 2018
12:30

Report

Crvena zvezda U19 (Serbia)	63–57	(Montenegro) Budućnost VOLI U19
Scoring by quarter: 13–14, 17–16, 18–18, 15–9
Pts: Tomašević 22; Rebs: Paunović 12; Asts: Paunović 4		Pts: Slavković 17; Rebs: Raičković 17; Asts: Raičković 3

Laktaši Sports Hall, Laktaši

==== Igokea U19 v Mega Bemax U19 ====
27 January 2018
15:00

Report

Igokea U19 (Bosnia and Herzegovina)	70–73	(Serbia) Mega Bemax U19
Scoring by quarter: 14–8, 19–15, 19–18, 18–32
Pts: Živković 17; Rebs: Ilić 11; Asts: Janković 8		Pts: Bitadze 17; Rebs: Bitadze 14; Asts: Kuzmanović 2

Laktaši Sports Hall, Laktaši

=== Third place ===
28 January 2018
14:30

Report

Budućnost VOLI U19 (Montenegro)	74–77	(Bosnia and Herzegovina) Igokea U19
Scoring by quarter: 23–24, 22–14, 17–16, 12–23
Pts: Slavković 30; Rebs: Kočić 10; Asts: Kočić 4		Pts: Ilić 21; Rebs: Ilić 11; Asts: Janković 6

Laktaši Sports Hall, Laktaši

=== Final ===
28 January 2018
17:00

Report

Crvena zvezda U19 (Serbia)	60–82	(Serbia) Mega Bemax U19
Scoring by quarter: 24–20, 13–15, 9–22, 14–25
Pts: Paunović 14; Rebs: Popović 9 Asts: Paunović 3		Pts: Marjanović 25; Rebs: Bitadze 8 Asts: Jovičić 4

Laktaši Sports Hall, Laktaši

Crvena zvezda	Mega Bemax

Starters:			Pts	Reb	Ast
PG	10	(Serbia) Lazar Vasić	10	4	2
G	9	(Serbia) Arijan Lakić	7	5	5
G/F	11	(Serbia) Zoran Paunović	14	4	3
F	7	(Serbia) Nemanja Popović	11	9	0
F/C	13	(Montenegro) Bojan Tomašević	13	5	0
Reserves:					
PG	4	(Serbia) Vukašin Mašić	0	0	1
SF	5	(Serbia) Ranko Simović	DNP		
F	6	(Serbia) Luka Jovanović	0	0	0
SF	8	(Serbia) Uroš Isailović	0	0	0
C	12	(Serbia) Veljko Radaković	4	0	0
C	14	(Serbia) Miloš Ćojbašić	DNP		
SG	15	(Serbia) Lazar Živanović	3	2	0
Head coach:
(Serbia) Bojan Đerić

2017–18 Junior ABA League Champions

Mega Bemax U19
1st title
MVP
(Georgia (country)) Goga Bitadze

Starters:			Pts	Reb	Ast
PG	12	(Serbia) Mihailo Jovičić	10	1	4
SG	44	(Serbia) Altin Islamović	1	2	0
SF	9	(Serbia) Andrija Marjanović	25	4	2
PF	8	(Serbia) Bogdan Nedeljković	16	7	3
C	15	(Georgia (country)) Goga Bitadze	17	8	1
Reserves:					
PG	0	(Serbia) Vladan Musić	0	0	0
C	6	(Serbia) Mateja Jovanović	2	1	0
SF	7	(Montenegro) Marko Kljajević	2	1	0
G/F	13	(Serbia) Luka Cerovina	0	5	1
F/C	14	(Serbia) Novak Mišković	2	0	0
PG	20	(Serbia) Pavle Kuzmanović	7	3	2
C	33	(Bosnia and Herzegovina) Amar Mehić	0	1	0
Head coach:
(Serbia) Vlada Vukoičić

== Awards ==
Pos.	Player	Team	Ref.
MVP
C	(Georgia (country)) Goga Bitadze	(Serbia) Mega Bemax U19	
Ideal Starting Five
PG	(Montenegro) Andrija Slavković	(Montenegro) Budućnost VOLI U19	
SG	(Serbia) Zoran Paunović	(Serbia) Crvena zvezda U19	
SF	(Serbia) Andrija Marjanović	(Serbia) Mega Bemax U19	
PF	(Serbia) Dalibor Ilić	(Bosnia and Herzegovina) Igokea U19	
C	(Georgia (country)) Goga Bitadze	(Serbia) Mega Bemax U19	

== See also ==
- 2017–18 ABA League First Division
