= 2008–09 ABA NLB League =

2008–09 NLB League season
- League: Liga ABA
- Sport: Basketball
- Teams: Serbia (5 teams); Croatia (4 teams); Slovenia (3 teams); Bosnia and Herzegovina (1 team); Montenegro (1 team)

Regular season
- Season champions: (Serbia) Partizan
- Season MVP: (Croatia) Ante Tomić (Zagreb)
- Top scorer: (Serbia) Dragan Labović (FMP Železnik) (17.96 ppg)

Final four
- Champions: (Serbia) Partizan

NLB League seasons
- ← 2007–08 2009–10 →

The ABA NLB League 2008–09 season was the 8th season of the Liga ABA. This season saw a return to the competition system in use in 2003–04, when the Final Four Tournament was played at the end of the regular season.

A total of 14 teams from Slovenia, Montenegro, Bosnia and Herzegovina, Croatia and Serbia participated in the NLB League season: Union Olimpija, Helios, Krka, Cibona, Zagreb, Zadar, Split, Bosna, Crvena zvezda, Partizan, FMP Železnik, Hemofarm, Vojvodina, Budućnost.

There were 26 round played in the regular part of the season. The best four teams later qualified for the Final Four Tournament, which was played in Belgrade between April 16 and April 18 (Partizan, Cibona, Hemofarm, Crvena zvezda).

Partizan became the 2009 League Champion.

== Team information ==
=== Venues and locations ===
Country	Teams	Team	City	Venue (Capacity)
Serbia	5			
Serbia	5	Partizan	Belgrade	Pionir Hall (8,150)
Serbia	5	Hemofarm STADA	Vršac	Millennium Center (5,000)
Serbia	5	Crvena zvezda	Belgrade	Pionir Hall (8,150)
Serbia	5	FMP Železnik	Belgrade	Železnik Hall (3,000)
Serbia	5	Vojvodina Srbijagas	Novi Sad	SPC Vojvodina (8000)
Croatia	4			
Croatia	4	Cibona	Zagreb	Dražen Petrović Basketball Hall (5,400)
Croatia	4	Zadar	Zadar	Krešimir Ćosić Hall (9,200)
Croatia	4	Zagreb CO	Zagreb	Trnsko (2,000)
Croatia	4	Split CO	Split	Arena Gripe (6,000)
Slovenia	3			
Slovenia	3	Union Olimpija	Ljubljana	Hala Tivoli (6,000)
Slovenia	3	Helios	Domžale	Dvorana Komunalnega centra (2,180)
Slovenia	3	Krka	Novo Mesto	Leon Štukelj Hall (2,000)
Bosnia and Herzegovina	1			
Bosnia and Herzegovina	1	Bosna ASA BHT	Sarajevo	Dvorana Mirza Delibašić (6,500)
Montenegro	1			
Montenegro	1	Budućnost	Podgorica	Morača Sports Center (4,570)

== Regular season ==
=== League table ===
	Team	W	L	Pts	PF:PA	Diff
1	Partizan	23	3	49	1966:1771	195
2	Cibona	19	7	45	2088:1945	143
3	Hemofarm STADA	19	7	45	2082:1987	95
4	Crvena zvezda	19	7	45	2010:1913	97
5	Zadar	17	9	43	2139:1935	204
6	Budućnost m:tel	15	11	41	2017:1972	45
7	Bosna ASA BHT	11	15	37	2025:2062	-37
8	FMP Železnik	10	16	36	2071:2094	-23
9	Union Olimpija	10	16	36	1981:1999	-18
10	Split CO	10	16	36	1899:2014	-115
11	Krka	9	17	35	1897:2041	-144
12	Helios	8	18	34	1897:2010	-113
13	Zagreb CO	8	18	34	1983:2100	-117
14	Vojvodina Srbijagas	4	22	30	1967:2179	-212

Qualified for Final four
Did not qualify for next season

Pld - Played; W - Won; L - Lost;
PF - Points for; PA - Points against; Diff - Difference;
Pts - Points.

=== Incident ===
On Tuesday, 20 January 2009 around 10:40pm at the Split Airport, Red Star Belgrade players were attacked by a group of 20 Croatian hooligans, members of Torcida Split hooligan firm, and supporters of KK Split. The attack occurred inside the airport building as the players and club staff were checking-in for the charter flight back to Belgrade after beating KK Split 62-67 earlier that night in Gripe Hall. The hooligans entered the airport building, stormed the main hall, and attacked the Red Star group with sticks, glass bottles, and rocks, before escaping out of the building using another entrance. The attack did not appear to be organized.

No serious injuries were reported except for Red Star's American shooting guard Andre Owens who got a laceration on his knee as he jumped over the check-in counter to avoid the charging hooligans.

In a press release prompted by the incident, KK Split's management distanced themselves form the behaviour of their fans, expressing regret over the incident. Club president Dino Rađa also publicly apologized.

== Stats Leaders ==
=== Points ===
Rank	Name	Team	Points	Games	PPG
1.	(Serbia) Dragan Labović	FMP Železnik	467	26	17,96
2.	(United States) Eddie Shannon	Split	406	26	15,62
3.	(United States) Nicholas Jacobson	Helios	390	25	15,60
4.	(United States) Richard Shields	Krka	388	25	15,52
5.	(Croatia) Ante Tomić	Zagreb	371	24	15,46

=== Rebounds ===
Rank	Name	Team	Rebounds	Games	RPG
1.	(Croatia) Ante Tomić	Zagreb	206	24	8,58
2.	(North Macedonia) Todor Gečevski	Zadar	204	26	7,85
3.	(Serbia) Novica Veličković	Partizan	180	26	6,92
4.	(Bulgaria) Dejan Ivanov	Zadar	151	22	6,86
5.	(North Macedonia) Predrag Samardžiski	FMP Železnik	178	26	6,85

=== Assists ===
Rank	Name	Team	Assists	Games	APG
1.	(Croatia) Rok Stipčević	Zadar	117	26	4,50
2.	(Serbia) Dušan Djordjević	Bosna	116	26	4,46
3.	(United States) Eddie Shannon	Split	111	26	4,27
4.	(Slovenia) Jure Močnik	Helios	98	26	3,77
5.	(Serbia) Filip Čović	FMP Železnik	73	21	3,48

=== Ranking MVP ===
Rank	Name	Team	Efficiency	Games	Average
1.	(Croatia) Ante Tomić	Zagreb	538	24	22,42
2.	(Serbia) Dragan Labović	FMP	508	26	19,54
3.	(North Macedonia) Todor Gečevski	Zadar	484	26	18,62
4.	(Serbia) Novica Veličković	Partizan	457	26	17,58
5.	(United States) Eddie Shannon	Split	439	26	16,88

=== MVP Round by Round ===
Round	Player	Team	Efficiency
1	(Croatia) Ante Tomić	Zagreb	36
2	(Serbia) Vladan Vukosavljević	Hemofarm	39
3	(Serbia) Miroslav Raduljica	FMP	37
4	(Serbia) Dejan Borovnjak	Vojvodina	29
5	(Montenegro) Vladimir Golubović	Olimpija	35
6	(Croatia) Ante Tomić (2)	Zagreb	35
7	(Croatia) Ante Tomić (3)	Zagreb	32
8	(Serbia) Dejan Borovnjak(2)	Vojvodina	34
9	(United States) Antonio Grant	Split	31
10	(Croatia) Ante Tomić (4)	Zagreb	32
11	(United States) Richard Shields	Krka	32
12	(Serbia) Marko Kešelj	Crvena zvezda	33
13	(Serbia) Dragan Labović	FMP	32
14	(Serbia) Novica Veličković	Partizan	40
15	(Croatia) Rok Stipčević	Zadar	35
16	(Serbia) Dragan Labović (2)	FMP	30
17	(United States) Alan Anderson	Cibona	38
18	(United States) Nicholas Jacobson	Helios	37
19	(United States) Lorinza Harrington	Olimpija	34
20	(United States) Eddie Shannon	Split	34
21	(Croatia) Ante Tomić (5)	Zagreb	32
22	(Serbia) Stefan Marković	Hemofarm	33
23	(United States) Charron Fisher	Vojvodina	31
24	(United States) Charron Fisher (2)	Vojvodina	37
25	(Serbia) Jovo Stanojević	Vojvodina	36
26	(Serbia) Dragan Labović (3)	FMP	26
27	(United States) Alan Anderson (2)	Cibona	27
28	(Serbia) Novica Veličković (2)	Partizan	22

Source: NLB League

== Final four ==
Matches played in, Belgrade, Serbia

Semifinals; April 16
1	Partizan	64
4	Crvena zvezda	58
2	Cibona	77
3	Hemofarm STADA	65

Final; April 18
1	Partizan	63
2	Cibona	49

=== Semifinals ===
==== Partizan vs. Crvena zvezda ====
April 16
20:45 CET

Report

Partizan (Serbia)	64–58	(Serbia) Crvena zvezda
Scoring by quarter: 13-11, 18-12, 15-15, 18-20
Pts: Tepić 14; Rebs: Veličković, Vesely, Vraneš 7 Asts: Tepić 4		Pts: Kikanović 15; Rebs: Roberts 8 Asts: Marković 4

Belgrade Arena, Belgrade
Attendance: 10,750
Referees: Muhvić (CRO), Jovčić (SRB), Herceg (CRO)

==== Cibona vs. Hemofarm STADA ====
April 16
18:15 CET

Report

Cibona (Croatia)	77–65	(Serbia) Hemofarm STADA
Scoring by quarter: 24-11, 20-21, 21-17, 12-16
Pts: Anderson 24; Rebs: Homan 8 Asts: Anderson 4		Pts: Vukosavljević 18; Rebs: Božović 6 Asts: Pavković 4

Belgrade Arena, Belgrade
Attendance: 3,500
Referees: Pukl (SLO), Boltauzer (SLO), Javor (SLO)

=== Final ===
April 18
20:45 CET

Report

Partizan (Serbia)	63–49	(Croatia) Cibona
Scoring by quarter: 17-9, 21-18, 9-16, 16-6
Pts: Veličković, 17; Rebs: Veličković 8 Asts: Tepić 5		Pts: Anderson 22; Rebs: Calloway 7 Asts: Anderson 4

Belgrade Arena, Belgrade
Attendance: 13,328
Referees: Pukl (SLO), Šutulović (MNE), Kolar (SLO)

2008–09 ABA NLB League Champions
(Serbia)
Partizan
3rd title
