= Luka Cerovina =

Serbian basketball player

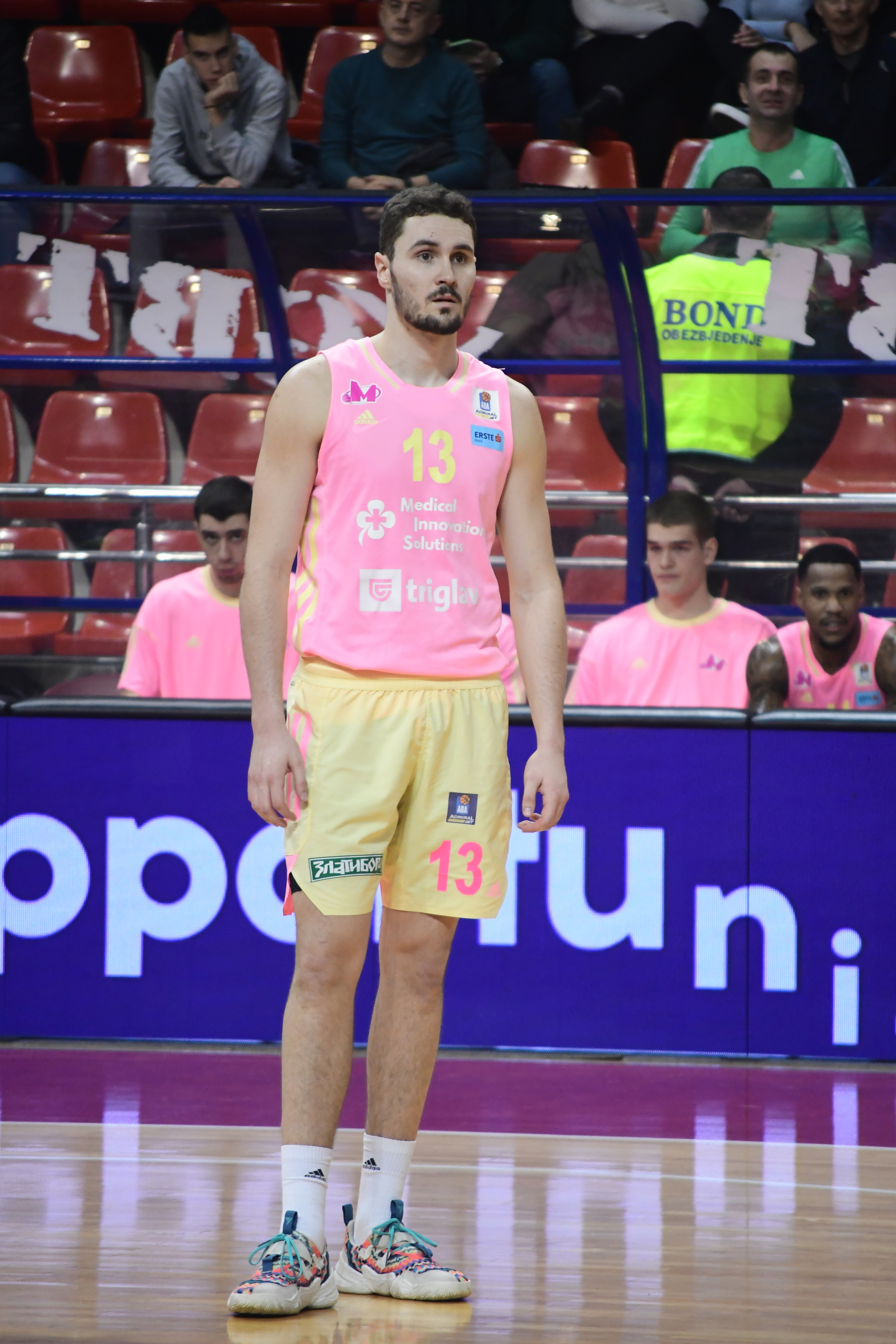
- Cerovina with Mega in 2023

No. 13 – Spartak Subotica
- Position: Small forward
- League: Serbian SuperLeague; ABA League; FIBA Champions League

Personal information
- Born: April 8, 2000 (age 26) Kragujevac, Serbia, FR Yugoslavia
- Listed height: 2.01 m (6 ft 7 in)
- Listed weight: 99 kg (218 lb)

Career information
- NBA draft: 2022: undrafted
- Playing career: 2018–present

Career history
- 2018–2023: Mega Basket
- 2018–2019: →OKK Beograd
- 2023: SLUC Nancy Basket
- 2023–present: Spartak Subotica

Career highlights
- Serbian League champion (2026); Serbian League MVP (2025); ABA League Second Division champion (2023–24); Junior ABA League champion (2018)
Medals
Men's basketball
Representing Serbia
FIBA Europe Under-18 Championship
Gold medal – first place	2018 Latvia	U18 Team

Luka Cerovina (Serbian Cyrillic: Лука Церовина; born April 8, 2000) is a Serbian professional basketball player for Spartak Subotica of the Serbian SuperLeague, the ABA League, and the FIBA Champions League.

== Early career ==
Cerovina started to play basketball for a youth system of his hometown team KK Polet. In 2016, he joined the youth system of Mega Basket from Belgrade. He won the 2017–18 Junior ABA League season for the Mega Bemax U19 team. Over six season games, he averaged 8.8 points, 5.5 rebounds and 2.8 assists per game.

== Professional career ==
Prior to the 2017–18 Serbian SuperLeague season, Cerovina was promoted to the Mega Bemax first team. On April 18, 2018, he made a debut and the first career start in a home win against Tamiš with ten points, five rebounds, and four assists.

On June 23, 2023, he signed with SLUC Nancy Basket of the LNB Pro A.

== National team career ==
Cerovina was a member of the Serbian under-18 team that won the gold medal at the 2018 FIBA Europe Under-18 Championship in Latvia. Over seven tournament games, he averaged 1.8 points, 2.2 rebounds and 0.5 assists per game.

Cerovina was a member of the Serbian under-19 team that finished 7th at the 2019 FIBA Under-19 Basketball World Cup in Heraklion, Greece. Over seven tournament games, he averaged 4.9 points, 4.3 rebounds and 3.7 assists per game.
