= Nikola Mišković =

Serbian basketball player

No. 5 – Álftanes
- Position: Power forward
- League: Úrvalsdeild karla

Personal information
- Born: 25 January 1999 (age 27) Toruń, Poland
- Listed height: 2.09 m (6 ft 10 in)
- Listed weight: 101 kg (223 lb)

Career information
- Playing career: 2017–present

Career history
- 2017–2021: Mega Basket
- 2018: → Beovuk 72
- 2021: Arka Gdynia
- 2021–2022: Podgorica
- 2022: Apollon Patras
- 2023: CB Menorca
- 2023–2024: BC Irkut Irkutsk
- 2024–2025: Pelister
- 2026–present: Álftanes

Career highlights
- Europe U18 Championship MVP (2017); Jordan Brand Classic (2015)
Medals
Men's basketball
Representing Serbia
FIBA Europe Under-18 Championship
Gold medal – first place	2017 Slovakia	U18 Team

Nikola Mišković (Serbian Cyrillic: Никола Мишковић; born 25 January 1999) is a Serbian professional basketball player for Álftanes of the Icelandic Úrvalsdeild karla.

== Early life ==
Mišković was born in Poland, as his father Dejan Mišković was playing for AZS UMK Toruń of the Polish Basketball League. Also, his father played for the Crvena zvezda and many other teams around Europe.

Mišković played the Euroleague Basketball Next Generation Tournaments for the Mega Leks U18 (2015–2017). On 17 April 2015, he participated at 2015 Jordan Brand Classic International Game in Brooklyn, New York.

== Professional career ==
On 30 January 2017, Mišković signed the first professional contract with the Mega Bemax. In February 2018, he was loaned to Beovuk 72 for the 2017–18 Serbian League season. On 20 February, he made his debut for Beovuk 72 in a game against Borac Čačak. He made his Adriatic League debut on 5 March 2018 in a game against Zadar. He left Mega in August 2021.

On 21 September 2021, Mišković signed with Arka Gdynia of the Polish Basketball League. In November 2021, he moved to Montenegrin club Podgorica.

On 5 September 2022, Mišković signed with Greek club Apollon Patras. On 5 December of the same year, he parted ways with the team.

He signed with Álftanes for the second half of the 2025–2026 season but was released after only three games in February 2026.

== National team career ==
Mišković was a member of the Serbian U-18 national basketball team that won the gold medal at the 2017 FIBA Europe Under-18 Championship. Over seven tournament games, he averaged 12.6 points, 5.9 rebounds, and 1.3 assists per game. He was instrumental in the gold-medal game with a game-high 23 points, 4 rebounds, and 2 assists, as Serbia defeated Spain 74–62 after an excellent second-half performance. At the tournament's end, he picked up the Most Valuable Player award and got selected to All-Tournament Team. Also, he participated at the 2016 FIBA Europe Under-18 Championship.

Mišković was a member of the Serbian under-20 team that finished 15th at the 2019 FIBA U20 European Championship in Tel Aviv, Israel. Over seven tournament games, he averaged 7.3 points, 3.6 rebounds, and 2.3 assists per game.

== Career achievements and awards ==
=== Serbian national team ===
- 2017 FIBA Europe Under-18 Championship: Gold

=== Individual ===
- FIBA Europe Under-18 Championship MVP – 2017
- FIBA Europe Under-18 Championship All-Tournament Team – 2017

== Personal life ==
Mišković has a younger brother who is also a basketball player. Novak (born 2001) also grew up with the Mega Basket youth system.
