= Aleksandar Gajić =

Serbian basketball player

Personal information
- Born: 14 January 1983 (age 43) Belgrade, SFR Yugoslavia
- Listed height: 1.86 m (6 ft 1 in)
- Listed weight: 81 kg (179 lb)

Career information
- NBA draft: 2005: undrafted
- Playing career: 2000–2021
- Position: Point guard
- Number: 6, 7, 23

Career history
- 2000–2002: Partizan
- 2002–2003: Crvena zvezda
- 2003–2004: Lukoil Academic
- 2004–2005: Sloga
- 2005: Bosna
- 2005–2006: APOEL
- 2006: Khimik
- 2006–2007: Igokea
- 2007–2008: Ilysiakos
- 2008: Swisslion Takovo
- 2009: Napredak Kruševac
- 2009–2012: AEK Larnaca
Medals
Men's basketball
Representing FR Yugoslavia
FIBA U16 European Championship
Gold medal – first place	1999 Slovenia	U16 Team

Aleksandar Gajić (Serbian Cyrillic: Александар Гајић; born 14 January 1983) is a Serbian former professional basketball player.

== Professional career ==
A point guard, Gajić played for Partizan, Crvena zvezda, Lukoil Academic, Sloga, Bosna, APOEL, Khimik, Igokea, Ilysiakos, Swisslion Takovo, Napredak Kruševac, and AEK Larnaca. He retired as a player with AEK Larnaca in 2012.

== National team career ==
In July 1999, Gajić was a member of the Yugoslavia U16 national team that won the gold medal at the European Championship for Cadets in Slovenia. Over eight tournament games, he averaged 6.9 points, 1.2 rebounds and 1.2 assists per game. At the tournament's end, he picked up the Most Valuable Player award.

In July 2000, Gajić was a member of the Yugoslavia U18 team that won the gold medal at the FIBA Europe Under-18 Championship in Zadar, Croatia. Over five tournament games, he averaged 3 points, 1.2 rebounds and 1.8 assists per game.

== Career achievements ==
- YUBA League champion: 1 (with Partizan: 2001–02)
- Bulgarian National League champion: 1 (with Lukoil Academic: 2003–04)
- Yugoslav Cup winner: 1 (with Partizan: 2001–02)
- Bulgarian Cup winner: 1 (with Lukoil Academic: 2003–04)
- Cup of Bosnia and Herzegovina winner: 1 (with Igokea: 2006–07)
