= Zoran Paunović =

Serbian basketball player (born 2000)

Sloga
- Position: Shooting guard
- League: ABA League; Basketball League of Serbia

Personal information
- Born: 19 July 2000 (age 26) Niš, Serbia, FR Yugoslavia
- Listed height: 1.99 m (6 ft 6 in)
- Listed weight: 90 kg (198 lb)

Career information
- NBA draft: 2022: undrafted
- Playing career: 2018–present

Career history
- 2018–2019: Crvena zvezda mts
- 2018–2019: → FMP
- 2019–2020: Dynamic Belgrade
- 2020–2021: Metalac
- 2021–2022: Podgorica
- 2022–present: Sloga

Career highlights
- All-Junior Adriatic League Team (2018)
Medals
Men's basketball
Representing Serbia
FIBA Europe Under-18 Championship
Gold medal – first place	2018 Latvia	U18 Team

Zoran Paunović (Serbian Cyrillic: Зоран Пауновић, born 19 July 2000) is a Serbian professional basketball player for CS Vâlcea 1924 in the National Romanian Basketball League (LNBM).

== Early career ==
Paunović started to play basketball in his hometown Niš, for the OKK Konstantin youth selections. In Summer 2014, he joined the Crvena zvezda youth. He won the second place at the 2017–18 Junior ABA League season with the Zvezda. Over six season games, he averaged 14.2 points, 5.7 rebounds and 3.2 assists per game. In August 2017, he participated at the Basketball Without Borders Europe Camp 16 in Netanya, Israel.

== Professional career ==
In January 2018, Paunović was added to the Crvena zvezda ABA League roster for the rest of the 2017–18 season. He missed to play a single game during that season. On 25 July 2018, Paunović signed a four-year professional contract with Crvena zvezda. Prior to the 2018–19 season he was loaned out to FMP. On 28 August 2019, Crveza zvezda parted ways with him.

On 11 September 2019, Paunović signed for Dynamic Belgrade. In May 2020, after the COVID-19 pandemic ban, he joined a training camp of Partizan.

On 22 June 2021, Paunović signed for Podgorica.

== National team career ==
Paunović was a member of the Serbian under-16 team that competed at the 2016 FIBA Europe Under-16 Championship in Poland. Over seven tournament games, he averaged 14.6 points, 4.0 rebounds and 2.9 assists per game. Paunović was a member of the Serbian under-18 team that won the gold medal at the 2018 FIBA Europe Under-18 Championship in Latvia. Over seven tournament games, he averaged 16.7 points, 4.1 rebounds and 3.4 assists per game. Paunović was a member of the Serbian under-19 team that finished 7th at the 2019 FIBA Under-19 Basketball World Cup in Heraklion, Greece. Over seven tournament games, he averaged 7.3 points, 4.6 rebounds and 4.4 assists per game.
