= Bogdan Nedeljković =

Serbian basketball player (born 2000)

Marbella
- Position: Small forward / power forward
- League: LEB Plata

Personal information
- Born: April 1, 2000 (age 26) Loznica, Serbia, FR Yugoslavia
- Listed height: 2.03 m (6 ft 8 in)
- Listed weight: 95 kg (209 lb)

Career information
- NBA draft: 2022: undrafted
- Playing career: 2018–present

Career history
- 2018–2019: Igokea
- 2019–2020: Konstantin
- 2020–2021: Vršac
- 2021–2022: Marbella
- 2023: Herceg Novi

Career highlights
- Bosnian Cup winner (2019); Junior Adriatic League champion (2018)
Medals
Men's basketball
Representing Serbia
FIBA Europe Under-18 Championship
Gold medal – first place	2018 Latvia	U18 Team

Bogdan Nedeljković (Serbian Cyrillic: Богдан Недељковић; born April 1, 2000) is a Serbian professional basketball player for CB Marbella of the LEB Plata.

== Early career ==
Nedeljković started to play basketball for youth teams of his hometown team KK Loznica. In 2015, he joined the youth system of Mega Basket from Belgrade. He won the Junior ABA League Championship in the 2017–18 season with the U19 team. Over six tournament games, he averaged 7.3 points, 4.5 rebounds and 1.7 assists per game.

== Professional career ==
In August 2018, Nedeljković signed a contract with Bosnian club Igokea.

== National team career ==
Nedeljković was a member of the Serbian U16 team at the 2016 FIBA Europe Under-16 Championship. Nedeljković was a member of the Serbian U18 team that won the gold medal at the 2018 FIBA Europe Under-18 Championship in Latvia.
