= Danilo Petrović (basketball) =

Serbian basketball player

No. 10 – New Basket Brindisi
- Position: Power forward
- League: Lega Basket Serie A

Personal information
- Born: May 10, 1999 (age 27) Vršac, FR Yugoslavia (today Serbia)
- Listed height: 2.03 m (6 ft 8 in)
- Listed weight: 98 kg (216 lb)

Career information
- NBA draft: 2021: undrafted
- Playing career: 2015–present

Career history
- 2015–2017: Segafredo Virtus Bologna
- 2017–2018: We're Basket Ortona
- 2018–2019: Poderosa Montegranaro
- 2019–2020: Forlì 2.015
- 2020–2021: Benedetto XIV Cento
- 2021–2022: Basket Club Ferrara
- 2022–2023: Basket Ravenna
- 2023–2024: Real Sebastiani Rieti
- 2024–2025: Victoria Libertas Pesaro
- 2026–present: New Basket Brindisi

Career highlights
- Italian Second League champion (2017); Italian LNP Cup winner (2017)
Medals
Men's basketball
Representing Serbia
FIBA Europe Under-18 Championship
Gold medal – first place	2017 Slovakia	U18 Team

Danilo Petrović (Serbian Cyrillic: Данило Петровић; born May 10, 1999) is a Serbian professional basketball player for New Basket Brindisi of the Italian Lega Basket Serie A (LBA).

== Early career ==
His first basketball steps was in KK Vili and the Hemofarm-Stada, later he played for young team of the Crvena zvezda. He played the Euroleague Basketball Next Generation Tournaments for the Segafredo Virtus Bologna U18 team (2014–2016)

== Professional career ==
In 2015, Petrović made his senior basketball appearance for Virtus Bologna of the Serie A2 Basket.

In 2017, Petrović joined We're Basket Ortona of the Italian 3rd-tier Serie B. In 2018, he signed for Poderosa Basket Montegranaro of the Italian Serie A2.

On August 5, 2019, he has signed with Forlì 2.015 of the Italian 2nd-tier level Serie A2 Basket.

On July 2, 2024, he signed with Victoria Libertas Pesaro of the Italian Lega Basket Serie A (LBA).

== National team career ==
Petrović was a member of the Serbian U-18 national basketball team that won the gold medal at the 2017 FIBA Europe Under-18 Championship. Over seven tournament games, he averaged 4 points, 1 rebounds and 0.6 assists per game.
