= Andrija Marjanović =

Serbian basketball player

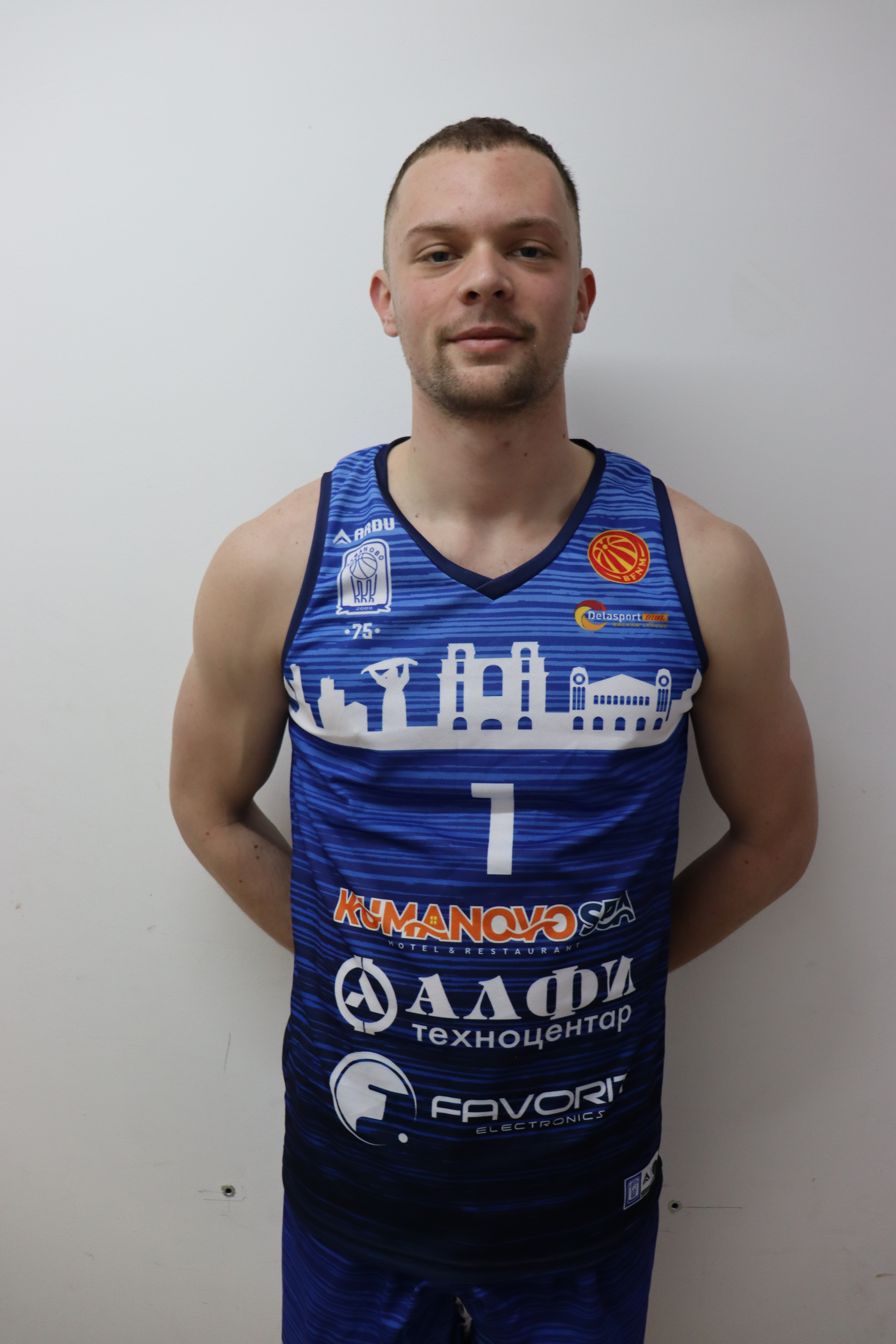

Niš
- Position: Shooting guard / small forward
- League: Second Basketball League of Serbia

Personal information
- Born: January 14, 1999 (age 27) Niš, Serbia, FR Yugoslavia
- Listed height: 2.02 m (6 ft 8 in)
- Listed weight: 97 kg (214 lb)

Career information
- NBA draft: 2021: undrafted
- Playing career: 2016–present

Career history
- 2016: FC Barcelona Lassa B
- 2017–2020: Mega Bemax
- 2017–2018: → Beovuk 72
- 2020: Sloboda Užice
- 2020–2021: Zlatibor
- 2021–2022: Metalac Valjevo
- 2022: Kumanovo
- 2022–2023: San Pablo Burgos
- 2023: Kumanovo
- 2023–2024: Club Melilla Baloncesto
- 2024–present: Niš

Career highlights
- Junior Adriatic League champion (2018); ANGT champion (2016); All-Junior Adriatic League Team (2018)
Medals
Men's basketball
Representing Serbia
FIBA Europe Under-18 Championship
Gold medal – first place	2017 Slovakia	U18 Team

Andrija Marjanović (Serbian Cyrillic: Андрија Марјановић; born January 14, 1999) is a Serbian professional basketball player for Niš of the Second Basketball League of Serbia.

== Early life ==
In June 2014, at 15 years of age, Marjanović moved to Barcelona, Spain where he played for FC Barcelona Lassa B. From 2015 to 2017, Marjanović played the Euroleague Basketball Next Generation Tournament for the FC Barcelona Lassa U18. In February 2017, Marjanović joined the Basketball Without Borders Global Camp in New Orleans, US.

== Professional career ==
On August 24, 2017, Marjanović signed a multi-year contract with Mega Bemax. He made his Adriatic League debut for Mega Bemax on October 4 in a game against the Crvena zvezda mts where he played 5 minutes without scoring. On start of 2017–18 KLS season he was loaned to Beovuk 72. On October 14, he made a debut for Beovuk 72 in a game against Vršac.

In July 2020, Marjanović signed a contract with Sloboda Užice. In October 2020, he joined Zlatibor. Marjanović signed with Metalac Valjevo in 2021 and averaged 13.1 points, 3.2 rebounds, and 2.3 assists per game. On March 16, 2022, he signed with KK Kumanovo of the Macedonian First League.

On August 8, 2022, he has signed with San Pablo Burgos of the LEB Oro.

== National team career ==
Marjanović was a member of the Serbian U-18 national basketball team that won the gold medal at the 2017 FIBA Europe Under-18 Championship. Over seven tournament games, he averaged 6 points, 3 rebounds and 0.9 assists per game. He was a member of the Serbian U-16 national basketball team which participate at the 2014 and 2015 FIBA Europe Under-16 Championship. Over nine 2015 tournament games, he averaged 14.1 points, 3.2 rebounds and 1.1 assists per game. Marjanović was a member of the Serbian under-20 team that finished 15th at the 2019 FIBA U20 European Championship in Tel Aviv, Israel. Over seven tournament games, he averaged 7.1 points, 1.9 rebounds, and 0.9 assists per game.
