= Edin Bavčić =

Bosnian basketball player (born 1984)

Personal information
- Born: 6 May 1984 (age 42) Foča, SR Bosnia-Herzegovina, SFR Yugoslavia
- Listed height: 6 ft 10 in (2.08 m)
- Listed weight: 242 lb (110 kg)

Career information
- NBA draft: 2006: 2nd round, 56th overall pick
- Drafted by: Toronto Raptors
- Playing career: 2003–2022
- Position: Power forward
- Number: 13

Career history
- 2003–2004: Bosna
- 2004: Ilidža
- 2004–2008: Bosna
- 2008–2009: Kepez Belediyespor
- 2009: Koln 99ers
- 2009–2010: Union Olimpija
- 2010: New Basket Brindisi
- 2010–2011: Khimik Yuzhny
- 2011: Aris Thessaloniki
- 2011: Vanoli Cremona
- 2011–2012: KAOD
- 2012: Limoges CSP
- 2012–2014: KAOD
- 2014–2015: Sigal Prishtina
- 2015–2016: Sopron
- 2016–2017: Apollon Patras
- 2017–2022: Klosterneuburg Dukes

Career highlights
- 3× Bosnian League champion (2005, 2006, 2008); Bosnian Cup winner (2005); Supercup of Slovenia winner (2009); Slovenian Cup winner (2010); Champions cup winner (2012); Kosovo Superleague champion (2015); Balkan League champion (2015)
- Stats at Basketball Reference

Edin Bavčić (born 6 May 1984) is a retired Bosnian professional basketball player.

== Professional career ==
=== Europe ===
Edin played for KK Bosna, which was the champion of the Bosnia and Herzegovina Basketball League in 2006.

At the beginning of the 2008–09 season, Bavčić joined TBL team Antalya Kepez Belediyesi but later in the season, he joined the Basketball Bundesliga team Köln 99ers. On 10 June 2009 he signed with Union Olimpija where he averaged 11.4 points and 6.3 rebounds per game in the Slovenian league, 5.7 points in the Adriatic League and 5.2 points and 4 rebounds at the Euroleague.

In 2011, he joined Aris BC, after having played for New Basket Brindisi, in Italy, and BC Khimik, in Ukraine.

In August 2011, he signed a one-year contract with Vanoli Cremona, however, they released him on December 6. The next day, he signed with Greek team KAOD.

On 16 August 2012 he signed with Limoges CSP where he averaged 2.3 points and 2.1 rebounds in 7 games. On 22 November he was released by Limoges. On 4 December he re-signed with KAOD.

On 2 September 2014 he signed with Sigal Prishtina.

On September 15, 2015, he signed with Sopron of the Hungarian League after averaging 17 points and 10 rebounds per game at Kosovo.

On 17 August 2016 he signed with Apollon Patras of the Greek Basket League.

On 16 August 2017 he signed with Klosterneuburg Dukes of the Austrian Bundesliga. Bavčić announced his retirement from professional basketball in June 2022.

=== NBA ===
In June 2006, he was selected by the Toronto Raptors with the 56th pick of the 2006 NBA draft.

On 11 July 2012 the New Orleans Hornets agreed to a three-team trade acquiring the rights for Bavčić, while sending Jarrett Jack to the Golden State Warriors and Darryl Watkins to the Philadelphia 76ers.

On 21 January 2014 the New Orleans Pelicans traded Bavčić's rights to the Brooklyn Nets for Tyshawn Taylor. On 10 July 2014 the Nets traded his rights to the Cleveland Cavaliers.
