= Mihailo Jovičić =

Serbian basketball player

KTE Duna Aszfalt
- Position: Point guard

Personal information
- Born: January 24, 1999 (age 27) Kragujevac, Serbia, FR Yugoslavia
- Listed height: 1.90 m (6 ft 3 in)
- Listed weight: 84 kg (185 lb)

Career information
- NBA draft: 2021: undrafted
- Playing career: 2014–present

Career history
- 2014–2016: Real Madrid B
- 2016–2021: Mega Basket
- 2018–2020: → OKK Beograd
- 2021–2022: Podgorica
- 2022–2023: SPD Radnički
- 2023-2024: Caledonia Gladiators
- 2024: Vršac
- 2024: Rabotnički
- 2024-2025: Tamiš
- 2025-2026: CSM Galați
- 2026-2027: KTE-Duna Aszfalt

Career highlights
- Junior Adriatic League champion (2018); Second Basketball League of Serbia champion (2023); Second Basketball League of Serbia MVP (2023)

Mihailo Jovičić (Serbian Cyrillic: Михаило Јовичић; born January 24, 1999) is a Serbian professional basketball player who plays for KTE-Duna Aszfalt of the Hungarian first division

== Early life ==
Jovičić started his basketball career playing with the youth teams of SK Foka from Kragujevac. In June 2014, at 15 years of age, he moved to Madrid, Spain where he played for the Real Madrid B. He played for Real Madrid cadet and junior team until 2016 when he went back to Serbia. In 2016–17 season, Jovičić played the Euroleague Basketball Next Generation Tournament for the Mega Leks U18 .

== Professional career ==
On January 30, 2017, Jovičić signed the first professional contract with the Mega Leks. He made his Adriatic League debut on October 1, 2017 in a home win against KK Cibona.

On 18 June 2021, Jovičić signed a multi-year contract with Podgorica.
