= Dejan Mišković (basketball) =

Serbian basketball player

Personal information
- Born: February 13, 1974 (age 52) Ingolstadt, West Germany
- Listed height: 6 ft 9 in (2.06 m)
- Listed weight: 235 lb (107 kg)

Career information
- NBA draft: 1996: undrafted
- Playing career: 1991–2010
- Position: Center
- Number: 14

Career history
- 1991–1996: Spartak Subotica
- 1996–1998: Crvena zvezda
- 1998–1999: AZS UMK Toruń
- 1999–2000: Stal Ostrów Wielkopolski
- 2000–2001: Crvena zvezda
- 2002–2003: Lokomotiv Mineralnye Vody
- 2003–2004: Apollon Limassol
- 2004–2005: Amsterdam Astronauts
- 2005–2006: Atlas
- 2006–2007: Doukas
- 2009–2010: Trust Pasargad Shiraz

Career highlights
- Yugoslav League champion (1998); Dutch League champion (2005)
Medals
Men's basketball
Representing FR Yugoslavia
European Championship for 22 and Under
Bronze medal – third place	1996 Turkey	U22 Team

Dejan Mišković (Serbian Cyrillic: Дејан Мишковић; born February 13, 1974) is a Serbian former professional basketball player.

== Playing career ==
Mišković played five seasons in total in the Yugoslav League, for Spartak Subotica, Crvena zvezda and Atlas. From 1998–2000, he played for AZS UMK Toruń and Stal Ostrów Wielkopolski of the Polish League. Also, he played for Lokomotiv Mineralnye Vody (Russian Super League 1), Apollon Limassol (Cyprus Division A), Amsterdam Astronauts (Dutch League) and Doukas (Greek A2 League). He finished his professional career in Iranian Super League where he played for the Trust Pasargad from Shiraz during the 2009–10 season.

== International career ==
Mišković was a member of the FR Yugoslavia national under-22 team that won the bronze medal at the 1996 European Championship for 22 and Under in Turkey. Over seven tournament games, he averaged 9.3 points, 4.7 rebounds and 0.3 assists per game. Also, he represented SFR Yugoslavia national under-16 team at the 1991 European Championship for Cadets together with Predrag Drobnjak, Saša Dončić, Haris Brkić and Zlatko Bolić among others. Over seven tournament games, he averaged 9.3 points per game.

== Career achievements and awards ==
=== Club ===
- Yugoslav League champion: 1 (with Crvena zvezda: 1997–98)
- Dutch League champion: 1 (with Amsterdam Astronauts: 2004–05)
- FIBA Korać Cup runner-up: (with Crvena zvezda: 1997–98)

=== National team ===
- 1996 European Championship for 22 and Under: Bronze

=== Individual ===
- Polish League All-Star Game: 1999

== Personal life ==
His sons Nikola (born 1999) and Novak (born 2001) are professional basketball players. Nikola is currently playing for the Mega Bemax and he was the 2017 FIBA Europe Under-18 Championship MVP. Novak is playing for the Mega Bemax junior team.
