= Ricky Shields =

American basketball player

Personal information
- Born: July 27, 1982 (age 44) Upper Marlboro, Maryland
- Listed height: 6 ft 4 in (1.93 m)

Career information
- High school: Hargrave Military Academy (Chatham, Virginia)
- College: Rutgers (2001–2005)
- NBA draft: 2005: undrafted
- Playing career: 2005–2011
- Position: Shooting guard

Career history
- 2005–2006: Florida Flame
- 2006: Polonia Warszawa
- 2006–2008: TED Kolejliler
- 2008–2009: Krka
- 2009: Kavala
- 2010: Helios Domžale
- 2010–2011: Mitteldeutscher BC

Richard Essington Shields (born July 27, 1982) is an American former professional basketball player. Standing at 6 ft 4 in (1.93 m) he played the shooting guard position.
