= Eddie Shannon =

American basketball coach (born 1977)

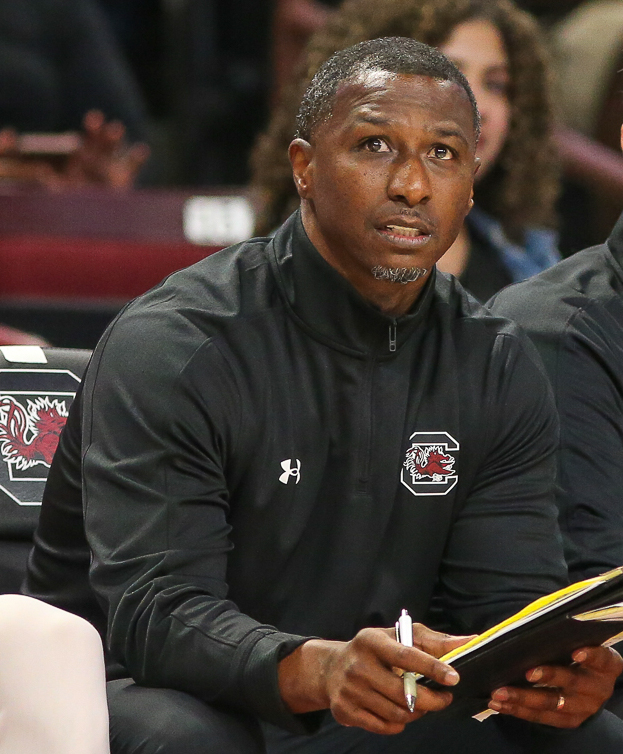
- Shannon as an assistant coach with South Carolina in 2022

South Carolina Gamecocks
- Title: Assistant coach
- League: Southeastern Conference

Personal information
- Born: January 29, 1977 (age 49) West Palm Beach, Florida, U.S.
- Listed height: 5 ft 11 in (1.80 m)
- Listed weight: 167 lb (76 kg)

Career information
- High school: Cardinal Newman (West Palm Beach, Florida)
- College: Florida (1995–1999)
- NBA draft: 1999: undrafted
- Playing career: 2001–2011
- Position: Point guard
- Coaching career: 2012–present

Career history

Playing
- 2001–2002: Plannja Basket
- 2002–2003: PBC Ural Great
- 2003–2005: Snaidero Cucine Udine
- 2005–2006: Dinamo Sassari
- 2006–2007: Ventspils
- 2007–2008: Strasbourg IG
- 2008–2009: Split
- 2009–2010: Apollon Limassol
- 2010: Fileni BPA Jesi
- 2010: AEK Athens
- 2010–2011: Adelaide 36ers

Coaching
- 2012–2015: Palm Beach Atlantic (assistant)
- 2015–2017: Chattanooga (assistant)
- 2017–2019: Canisius (assistant)
- 2019–2022: Chattanooga (assistant)
- 2022–present: South Carolina (assistant)

Career highlights
- USBWA Most Courageous Award (1999)

Eddie Shannon (born January 29, 1977) is an American basketball coach and former professional player who is an assistant coach for the South Carolina Gamecocks.

== Early life ==
Shannon, a native of West Palm Beach, Florida, has played his entire career essentially with only one eye. At the age of 10 while playing with some of his seventh-grade friends, he was unintentionally hit in the right eye with a rock, forever altering his vision. Following the accident, he underwent surgery to remove blood clots from his eye, and a year later, had a cataract removed. As an eighth-grader, his vision began to blur, and he could only see shadows.

Even with limited vision, Eddie went on to star for Cardinal Newman High School in West Palm Beach which led him to be recruited by the University of Florida where he became the Florida Gators starting point guard.

Despite Shannon continuing to excel on the basketball court, the vision in his right eye got progressively worse. After consulting a doctor, he decided to have a certain type of surgery, known as an Evisceration, which involves removing parts of his eye. He was eventually fitted with a cosmetic prosthesis that covers his damaged cornea leading him to wear goggles when playing, though he has since discarded them.

== Professional career ==
Most of Shannon's professional career was played in European leagues which included stints with KK Split in Croatia and Strasbourg IG in France. In all he spent some nine seasons in Europe including a stint as teammate to Australian Boomers center Chris Anstey at PBC Ural Great in Russia.

Shannon signed as an import player for the Adelaide 36ers midway through the 2010-11 NBL season and made his debut for the club as a substitute against the Wollongong Hawks on December 10, 2010 where he scored 12 points and had 5 assists in a solid debut for his new team. For the rest of the NBL season Shannon started all bar two games for the 36ers, only missing the two games due to an ankle sprain. At the end of the 2010–11 season Shannon had played 18 games for the 36ers and averaged 9.6 points, 2.5 rebounds and 4.4 assists per game.

Following the NBL season, Shannon was released by the 36ers. He then returned home to Florida where he hosted a basketball camp in West Palm Beach on July 23, 2011.

== Coaching career ==
Following the conclusion of his playing career, Shannon worked as an assistant coach for several collegiate teams. In 2022, he was hired to be an assistant coach at the University of South Carolina.
