= Jozo Brkić =

Bosnian-Herzogovinian basketball player

Traiskirchen Lions
- Position: Center
- League: Österreichische Basketball Bundesliga; Alpe Adria Cup

Personal information
- Born: 19 July 1986 (age 40) Mostar, SFR Yugoslavia
- Listed height: 6 ft 11 in (2.11 m)
- Listed weight: 260 lb (118 kg)

Career information
- NBA draft: 2007: Undrafted
- Playing career: 2004–present

Career history
- 2004–2007: HKK Široki
- 2007–2008: KK Dubrovnik
- 2008–2009: KK Trogir
- 2009–2012: HKK Čapljina Lasta
- 2012–2013: KK Zadar
- 2013–2014: KK Rogaška
- 2014–2015: KB Peja
- 2015: SZTE-Szedeak Szeged
- 2015-2017: KK Jolly Šibenik
- 2017–2018: Traiskirchen Lions
- 2018–2020: Iserlohn Kangaroos
- 2020-2024: ETB Miners Essen

Jozo Brkić (born 19 July 1986 in Mostar, SFR Yugoslavia) is a professional Bosnian-Herzegovinian basketball player. Brkić started his career with HKK Široki from Bosnia and Herzegovina.
