= Srđan Kočić =

Bosnian basketball player (born 1999)

Free agent
- Position: Small forward

Personal information
- Born: 27 November 1999 (age 26) Gradiška, Bosnia and Herzegovina
- Listed height: 2.01 m (6 ft 7 in)
- Listed weight: 95 kg (209 lb)

Career information
- NBA draft: 2021: undrafted
- Playing career: 2016–present

Career history
- 2016–2018: Spars Sarajevo
- 2018–2019: Budućnost
- 2018–2019: → Studentski centar
- 2019–2021: Igokea
- 2021: Borac Banja Luka
- 2021–2022: Vojvodina

Career highlights
- ABA League champion (2018); Montenegrin Cup winner (2018)
Medals
Men's basketball
Representing Bosnia and Herzegovina
FIBA Europe Under-16 Championship
Gold medal – first place	2015 Lithuania	U16 Team

Srđan Kočić (Serbian Cyrillic: Срђан Кочић; born 27 November 1999), is a Bosnian professional basketball player who last played for Vojvodina of the Basketball League of Serbia and the Adriatic 2 League. Kočić is a member of Bosnia and Herzegovina national youth basketball team.

== Playing career ==
On 22 August 2019, Kočić signed for Igokea of the ABA League. On 8 January 2021, he signed for Borac Banja Luka. In August 2021, he signed for Vojvodina of the Basketball League of Serbia.

== National team career ==
Kočić was a member of the Bosnia and Herzegovina U16 team that won the gold medal at the 2015 FIBA Europe Under-16 Championship. Over nine tournament games, he averaged 1.9 points, 2.7 rebounds and 1.0 rebounds per game. He also played at the 2016 FIBA Under-17 World Championship. Over four tournament games, he averaged 2.0 points, 6.0 rebounds and 2.8 rebounds per game.
