= Žarko Rakočević =

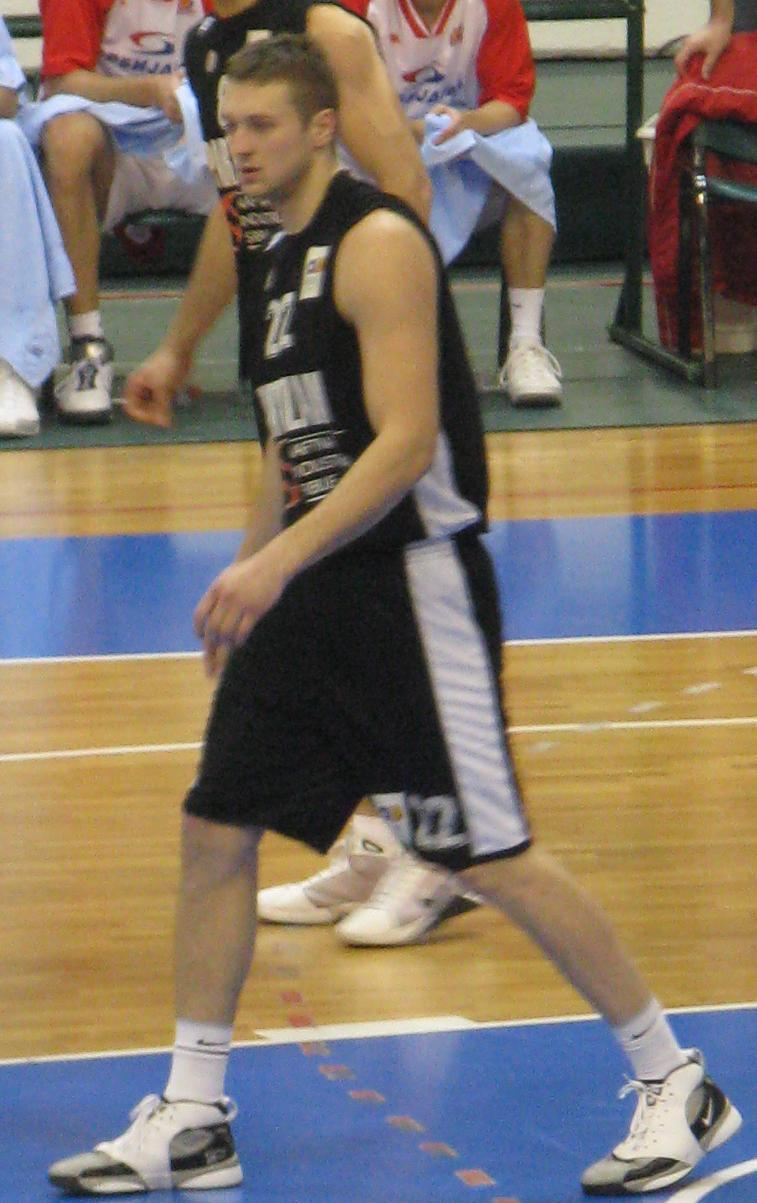
- Rakočević with Partizan in 2009

Personal information
- Born: January 4, 1984 (age 42) Kolašin, SFR Yugoslavia
- Listed height: 2.04 m (6 ft 8 in)
- Listed weight: 115 kg (254 lb)

Career information
- NBA draft: 2006: undrafted
- Playing career: 2002–present
- Position: Power forward

Career history
- 2002–2008: Budućnost Podgorica
- 2008: Cherkaski Mavpy
- 2008–2009: Partizan
- 2009: Gorštak Kolašin
- 2010: Bosna
- 2010–2011: Igokea
- 2011: BC Vienna
- 2011–2012: Valencia
- 2012: Lugano Tigers
- 2012–2013: Zepter Vienna
- 2013–2014: Körmend
- 2014: Al Muharraq
- 2014–2015: Rilski Sportist
- 2015: Atomerőmű SE
- 2016: Kumanovo
- 2016–2017: BC Orchies
- 2017–2018: Sorgues Basket Club
- 2018–2020: Union sportive Avignon Pontet
- 2020–2022: ALL Jura Basket
- 2022–2023: Étoile Charleville-Mézières

Career highlights
- Adriatic League champion (2009); Serbian League champion (2009); Serbian Cup winner (2009); Montenegrin League champion (2007); 2× Montenegrin Cup winner (2007, 2008)

Žarko Rakočević (Serbian: Жарко Ракочевић; born January 4, 1984) is a Montenegrin professional basketball player for Étoile de Charleville-Mézières of the French Nationale Masculine 2 (NM2). Standing at 2.04 m (6 ft 8 in), he plays at the power forward position.

== Professional career ==
Rakočević started his career with Budućnost Podgorica. In March 2008, he signed with the Ukrainian club Cherkaski Mavpy for the rest of the season. On August 28, 2008, he signed with the Serbian club Partizan Belgrade. In October 2009, he parted ways with Partizan. During November 2009, he played with Gorštak Kolašin. On December 11, 2009, he signed with Bosna for the rest of the season.

On July 15, 2010, he signed with Igokea for the 2010–11 season.

On September 26, 2011, he signed with the Austrian club BC Vienna. On December 12, 2011, he left Vienna and signed a one-month contract with the Spanish club Valencia. On January 13, 2012, he parted ways with the club following the expiration of his contract. On January 24, 2012, he signed with Lugano Tigers of the Swiss League for the rest of the season.

On August 24, 2012, he returned to Zepter Vienna. On February 6, 2013, he parted ways with Vienna. On July 2, 2013, he signed a one-year contract with the Hungarian club Körmend. In August 2014, he signed with Al Muharraq in Bahrain.

On December 16, 2014, he signed with the Bulgarian club Rilski Sportist for the rest of the season. On July 8, 2015, he signed with Hungarian club Atomerőmű SE. On January 5, 2016, he signed with Kumanovo of the Macedonian League. On March 9, 2016, he parted ways with Kumanovo.

On August 10, 2016, he signed with French club BC Orchies.
