= Aleksandar Bućan =

Serbian basketball coach

Personal information
- Born: July 14, 1973 (age 53) Belgrade, SR Serbia, SFR Yugoslavia
- Position: Head coach
- Coaching career: 1993–present

Career history

Coaching
- 1993–2002: Partizan (youth)
- 2002–2004: Lavovi 063 (youth, assistant)
- 2004–2005: Napredak Kruševac
- 2005: Swisslion Vršac
- 2005–2006: Radnički Zastava
- 2006: Tamiš
- 2006–2007: Napredak Kruševac
- 2007–2010: India
- 2010–2011: Železničar Inđija
- 2011–2019: Partizan (youth)
- 2019–2021: Vizura
Medals
Men's basketball
Head Coach for Serbia
U18 European Championship
Gold medal – first place	2018 Latvia	U18 Team
Silver medal – second place	2014 Turkey	U18 Team
Head Coach for Serbia and Montenegro
U16 European Championship
Bronze medal – third place	2006 Spain	U16 Team

Aleksandar Bućan (Serbian: Александар Бућан; born July 14, 1973) is a Serbian professional basketball coach who is a youth system coordinator of the Basketball Federation of Serbia Kids:Gala Bućan

Wife:/

== Coaching career ==
Bućan had multiple stints with Partizan NIS youth selections. He also coached senior teams of Napredak Kruševac, Swisslion Vršac, Radnički Zastava, Tamiš and Železničar.

=== National teams ===
Youth

Bućan coached the under-16 men's selection of the Serbia and Montenegro national team. At 2006 FIBA Europe Under-16 Championship, his team won the bronze medal.

Bućan coached youth men's selections of the Serbia national team (under-18, under-19, under-20). At the 2013 FIBA Europe Under-18 Championship, Serbia finished 6th among 16 teams. At the 2014 FIBA Europe Under-18 Championship Serbia won silver medal. At the 2015 FIBA Under-19 World Championship, Serbia finished 9th among 16 teams. At the 2016 FIBA Europe Under-20 Championship, Serbia finished 11th among 16 teams.

In November 2022, the Basketball Federation of Serbia hired Bućan as their new youth system coordinator.

Senior

On May 21, 2007, Bućan has been appointed head coach of the India national basketball team. At the 2007 FIBA Asia Championship, India finished 15th among 16 teams. At the 2009 FIBA Asia Championship, India finished 13th among 16 teams.
