= Marko Djurković =

Serbian basketball player

Marko Đurković
Personal information
- Born: February 24, 1987 (age 39) Banja Luka, SFR Yugoslavia
- Listed height: 2.06 m (6 ft 9 in)

Career information
- NBA draft: 2009: undrafted
- Playing career: 2005–2017
- Position: Power forward

Career history
- 2005–2006: Sloga Kraljevo
- 2006–2008: Partizan
- 2008–2009: Vizura
- 2009–2010: Igokea
- 2010: Borac Banja Luka
- 2010–2011: Vahostav Zilina
- 2011: Krka
- 2012: Zepter Vienna
- 2012–2013: Ezzahra Sports
- 2013–2014: CSU Pitești
- 2014–2015: Gaz Metan Mediaș
- 2015: Rabotnički
- 2015: CSU Craiova
- 2015–2016: BBC Monthey
- 2016–2017: Sutjeska

Marko Đurković (born February 24, 1987) is a retired Serbian professional basketball player who last played for KK Sutjeska of the Montenegrin Basketball League.
