= Dragan Labović =

Serbian basketball player (1987–2025)

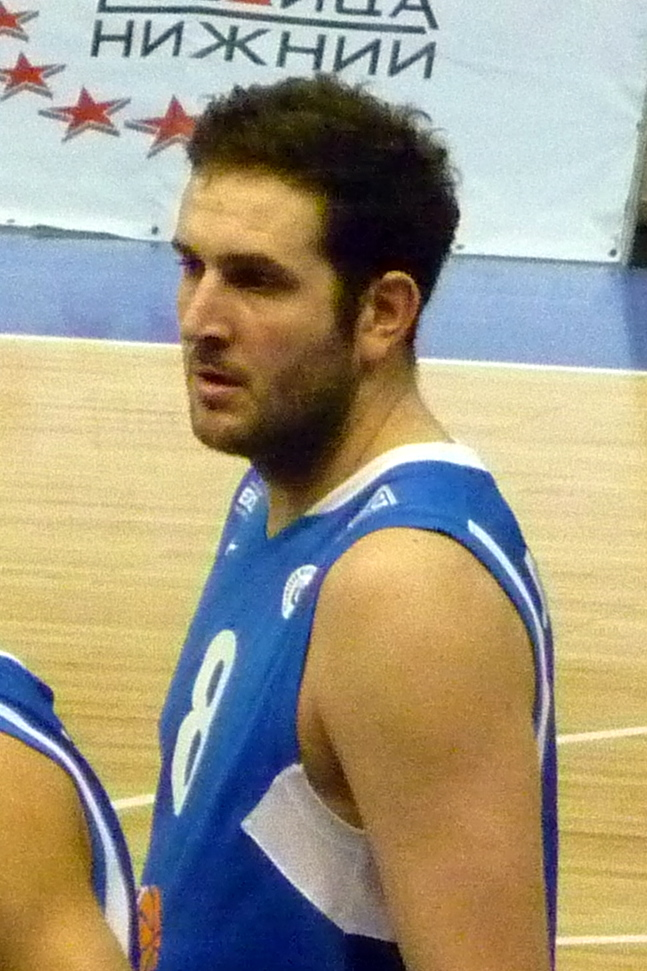
- Labović with Enisey in 2010

Personal information
- Born: April 20, 1987 Prokuplje, SR Serbia, Yugoslavia
- Died: May 9, 2025 (aged 38) Belgrade, Serbia
- Listed height: 2.07 m (6 ft 9 in)
- Listed weight: 115 kg (254 lb)

Career information
- NBA draft: 2009: undrafted
- Playing career: 2003–2019
- Position: Power forward

Career history
- 2003–2010: FMP
- 2005–2006: → Borac Čačak
- 2010: Aris
- 2010: Skyliners Frankfurt
- 2010–2011: Enisey
- 2011–2012: Krasnye Krylia
- 2012–2013: Nizhny Novgorod
- 2013–2014: AZS Koszalin
- 2014: Aliağa Petkim
- 2014: Al Riyadi Club
- 2014–2015: CSU Asesoft Ploiești
- 2015: İstanbul BB
- 2015–2016: BC Nokia
- 2016–2017: Karpoš Sokoli
- 2017–2019: BC Nokia

Career highlights
- Serbian Cup MVP (2007); ABA League Top Scorer (2009); 2× Serbian Cup winner (2005, 2007); Russian Cup winner (2012); Macedonian Cup winner (2017); FIBA Europe Under-18 Championship MVP (2005)
Medals
Men's basketball
Representing Serbia
U20 European Championship
Gold medal – first place	2007 Slovenia	Team
Representing Serbia and Montenegro
U20 European Championship
Gold medal – first place	2006 Turkey	Team
U18 European Championship
Gold medal – first place	2005 Serbia and Montenegro	Team
European Championship for Cadets
Gold medal – first place	2003 Spain	Team

Dragan Labović (Serbian Cyrillic: Драган Лабовић; 20 April 1987 – 9 May 2025) was a Serbian professional basketball player. A native of Prokuplje and a 2.07 m (6 ft 9 in) tall power forward, he rose to prominence during his teenage years, where he won four gold medals for the youth Serbian national basketball teams. He also represented the senior national team.

In his 16-year career, he played for many clubs around Europe, most notably for FMP Belgrade, Enisey, Krasnye Krylia and later in his career for Nokia and Karpoš Sokoli.

== Professional career ==
=== FMP Belgrade (2003–10) ===
Labović grew up with Zdravlje from Leskovac, from where he moved to juniors of Belgrade-based team FMP in 2002. He made his debut for the first team during the 2003–04 season, and in next two years he played a few games for the first team.

For the 2005–06 season, he was loaned to KK Borac Čačak where he had minutes to play and chance to improve himself. In 2006, he was invited to play at Nike Hoop Summit in Memphis, Tennessee. After one season at loan he went back to FMP. With FMP he won the 2007 Serbian Cup.

He was the ABA League Top Scorer of the 2008–09 season, averaging 18 points on 47% shooting from the field, 6.3 rebounds and 1.6 assists over 26 games. In his last season with the club, he averaged 4.3 points and 3.2 rebounds on 27.8% shooting from the field, over 13 ABA League games.

=== 2010: Short stints with Aris and Skyliners Frankfurt ===
On 3 January 2010, he signed with the Greek club Aris. He played only three league games and four Eurocup games, and in March 2010, he moved to Skyliners Frankfurt for the rest of the season.

=== 2010–13: Russian teams ===
During the 2010–11 season, he played for the Russian team Enisey. The following season, he moved to Krasnye Krylia. During the 2011–12 season, Labović averaged 13.5 points and 5.7 rebounds on 36.8% shooting from the field, in 16 VTB League games with Krasnye Krylia.

In June 2012, he signed a two-year contract with Nizhny Novgorod, but left the club after the first season.

=== 2013–14 ===
In November 2013, he signed with the Polish club AZS Koszalin. He left the club in January 2014 due to family reasons. On 31 January 2014, he signed with Aliağa Petkim of the Turkish Basketball League. He left them in April 2014. Later that month, he entered the Lebanese League, signing with Al Riyadi Club. He left Al Riyadi in May 2014, after having played only two games.

=== Asesoft Ploiești (2014–15) ===
In July 2014, he signed a one-year contract with the Romanian team CSU Asesoft Ploiești. In February 2015, he left Asesoft. In 12 league games he averaged 10.7 points per game. He also played 15 games in Eurocup where he had 8.3 points per game.

=== 2015: Short stint with İstanbul BB ===
In October 2015, he signed with the Turkish club İstanbul BB. He left Istanbul after appearing in four games, where he averaged 10 points, 3 rebounds and 1.3 assists on 58.3% shooting from the field.

=== Nokia (2015–16) ===
In December 2015, he signed with the Finnish club BC Nokia for the rest of the season. In 23 Finnish League games played, he averaged 19.1 points and 7.5 rebounds over 23 games.

=== Karpoš Sokoli (2016–17) ===
On 7 July 2016, Labović signed with Macedonian club Karpoš Sokoli. In his debut season with the team, he averaged 15.6 points and 4.7 rebounds on 46.3% shooting from the field in 26 ABA League games. On 19 June 2017, he re-signed with Karpoš Sokoli for one more season.

=== Return to Nokia (2017–19) ===
On 1 December 2017, he left Karpoš Sokoli and signed with his former club BC Nokia. During the 2017–18 season, he averaged 20.5 points, 7.9 rebounds and 2.2 assists on 53.7% shooting from the field, in 26 Finnish League games. In his last season with the team, Labović averaged 14 points, 5.6 rebounds and 1.6 assists over 40 Finnish League games.

== Serbian national team ==
=== Youth teams ===
Labović won the gold medal at the 2003 FIBA Europe Under-16 Championship and the 2005 FIBA Europe Under-18 Championship. He was MVP at 2005 FIBA Europe Under-18 Championship. He was part of the younger generation in the national teams did not lose a single match at official matches, and there he was one of the best players in that generation with Milenko Tepić and Miloš Teodosić.

=== Senior team ===
Labović made the Serbian national basketball team under head coach Moka Slavnić for the EuroBasket 2007. He appeared in three games, averaging 1.3 points and 1.4 rebounds per game.

Controversial 2012 press release about Dušan Ivković

During summer 2012, head coach Dušan Ivković included Labović on the preliminary list of players for the EuroBasket 2013 qualifying, but the 25-year-old power forward who had spent the preceding club season with Krasnye Krylia from Samara didn't make the final cut.

Commenting on his decision to exclude Labović, Ivković reportedly stated that "Labović has been having issues with his weight as he recently became a father and probably celebrated a little too much".

Stung by Ivković's comment, Labović responded months later, in September 2012, by putting out a bitter, somewhat cryptic, and highly unusual press release published by Serbian sports media outlets. Though Ivković's comments had been made months earlier, Labović's press release came following the completion of the EuroBasket qualifying cycle in which Serbia barely qualified on basket difference despite being in what most considered to be an easy qualifying group alongside Montenegro, Israel, Estonia, Iceland, and Slovakia.

In the release, Labović criticizes 68-year-old Ivković's professional integrity and coaching skills, accusing the famous coach of letting his agent Miško Ražnatović of the BeoBasket agency exert an undue influence when it comes to squad selection for the national team. Among other things, addressing Ivković directly, Labović said:

Mr. Ivković, I'd like to remind everyone of the year 2008 when I was the Adriatic League leading scorer and the MVP of every competition possible, all of which wasn't enough to make your national squad that had been put together by a certain managerial agency. That year, 2008, your team selection raised the transfer market price for a lot of players that never deserved it, while lowering mine considerably. Ninety percent of the players that participated in that qualifying cycle soon made millions as a result of the exposure received through the national team. I later did too, thank God, despite not being in the national team, despite being ignored by that managerial agency, and despite your phone calls around Europe to give instructions how players should play...... I don't think you're much of a coach. In fact I don't think you're a coach at all. You're more of a basketball philosopher. You won two Euroleagues, spending €970 million in the process.... I'm not playing for Real or Barcelona, but over the last three years I've got more basketball action in my legs than 80% of your national squad. While you're heading that team, nothing will change—Teodosić will always be hogging the ball before passing to Krle and that's the entire game plan. The rest of the players might as well be mascots cheering on the sidelines, which is the same role they have in their clubs. I suggest you consider a quiet life in retirement. I, for my part, will still be fat, playing 25-30 minutes per game, and making money despite not getting your endorsement.

A few weeks after his press release, Labović's club Nizhny Novgorod led by the Serbian head coach Zoran Lukić, reprimanded the player although his punishment was not specified.

== Personal life ==
On 19 July 2019, Labović was detained by police for public disturbance. The incident occurred at a pool party in the Belgrade suburb of Ovča where reportedly inebriated Labović began smashing bottles and verbally menacing the property's owner, identified in the Serbian press reports as Lazar M., who eventually called the police. After being kept for 12 hours at a Borča police station in order to sober up, Labović had a misdemeanour investigation request (prekršajna prijava) filed against him.

Labović was arrested in the Belgrade suburb of Železnik on 7 December 2021 in the immediate aftermath of an incident that reportedly saw him assault a taxi driver and drive off with his vehicle. The altercation reportedly began when Labović—while getting into the said taxi—took issue with the driver's request for Labović to have a seat in the back of the car in accordance with COVID-19 epidemiological measures.

On 9 May 2025, Labović died of a heart attack, at the age of 38.

== See also ==
- List of Serbia men's national basketball team players
