= Charron Fisher =

American basketball player

Personal information
- Born: November 15, 1985 (age 41) Camden, New Jersey
- Listed height: 6 ft 4 in (1.93 m)
- Listed weight: 230 lb (104 kg)

Career information
- High school: Roman Catholic (Philadelphia, Pennsylvania)
- College: Niagara (2004–2008)
- NBA draft: 2008: undrafted
- Playing career: 2008–2015
- Position: Guard / forward

Career history
- 2008–2009: Vojvodina Srbijagas
- 2009–2010: BC Kalev
- 2010–2011: APOEL
- 2011–2014: AEK Larnaca
- 2015: Hoops Club

Charron Fisher (born November 15, 1985) is an American former professional basketball player.

== College career ==
After attending Roman Catholic High School in Philadelphia, Fisher played college basketball at Niagara University. During his four-year stint with the Purple Eagles, between 2004 and 2008, he averaged 19.6 points, 7.6 rebounds, 1.1 assists and 1.1 steals per game. As a senior at Niagara, Fisher averaged 27.6 points, 9.5 rebounds, 1.2 assists and 1.7 steals per game.

== Professional career ==
After graduating from college, Fisher moved to Serbia and played for Vojvodina Srbijagas in the 2008–09 season. After that, he spent the full 2009–10 season with Kalev/Cramo in Estonia. In 2010, Fisher signed with APOEL from Cyprus, but an injury in November left him out for the rest of the 2010–11 season. In July 2011, Fisher signed a one-year contract for AEK Larnaca. With Petrolina AEK he won the Cypriot championship in 2013 and was named league MVP.
