= Filip Šepa =

Serbian basketball player

Borac Zemun
- Title: Sporting director
- League: Second League of Serbia

Personal information
- Born: 5 June 1990 (age 36) Belgrade, SR Serbia, SFR Yugoslavia
- Listed height: 1.98 m (6 ft 6 in)

Career information
- NBA draft: 2012: undrafted
- Playing career: 2008–2019
- Position: Shooting guard

Career history
- 2008–2009: Crvena zvezda
- 2009–2010: Radnički Kragujevac
- 2010–2011: Novi Sad
- 2011–2014: OKK Beograd
- 2014–2015: Kožuv
- 2015–2016: Karpoš Sokoli
- 2016: CSU Craiova
- 2017: Karpoš Sokoli
- 2017–2018: Olomoucko
- 2018: Zemun
- 2019: Bratunac
- 2019: UBSC Graz

Career highlights
- Macedonian Cup winner (2017)
Medals
Men's basketball
Representing Serbia and Montenegro
U16 European Championship
Bronze medal – third place	2006 Spain	Team

Filip Šepa (Serbian Cyrillic: Филип Шепа; born 5 June 1990) is a Serbian professional basketball executive and former player who is the sporting director for Borac Zemun of the Second Basketball League of Serbia.

== Professional career ==
A shooting guard, Šepa played for Crvena zvezda, Radnički Kragujevac, Novi Sad, OKK Beograd, Kožuv, Karpoš Sokoli, CSU Craiova, Olomoucko, Zemun, Bratunac, and UBSC Graz. He retired as a player with UBSC Graz in 2019.

== Post-playing career ==
After retirement, Šepa joined Borac Zemun as the sporting director. His team won the 2nd-tier Cup of Serbia for the 2021–22 season.
