= 2010–11 Serbian First League (basketball) =

2010–11 Serbian First League (Basketball)
- League: Serbian First League
- Sport: Basketball
- Duration: October 2, 2010 - April 17, 2011
- TV partner: Sos Kanal

Serbian First League seasons
- ← 2009–10 2011–12 →

The 2010–11 Serbian First League season is the 5th season of the Serbian First league (Basketball), the third professional basketball league in Serbia. The 182-game regular season (26 games for each of the 14 teams) began on Saturday, October 2, 2010, and will end on Sunday, April 17, 2011.

== Teams for 2010–11 season ==
Group North

Team	City	Arena	Capacity
KK Mladost Teletehnika	Bački Jarak		
KK Dunav	Stari Banovci		
KK Nova Pazova	Nova Pazova		
KK Meridiana	Novi Sad		
KK Odžaci	Odžaci		
KK Veternik	Veternik		
OKK Vrbas	Vrbas		
KK Stara Pazova	Stara Pazova		
KK Novi Sad MT	Novi Sad		
KK Topola	Bačka Topola		
KK Jedinstvo Novi Bečej	Novi Bečej		
KK Radnički	Kovin		
KK Sport Key	Novi Sad		
KK Duga	Novi Sad		

== Regular season ==
=== Serbian Second League Group North ===
Pos	Team	P	W	L	F	A	D	Pts
1	KK Mladost Teletehnika	20	19	1	1502	1186	+316	39
2	KK Dunav	21	17	4	1467	1247	+220	38
3	KK Nova Pazova	20	16	4	1397	1221	+176	36
4	KK Meridiana	20	16	4	1411	1190	+221	36
5	KK Odžaci	21	11	10	1375	1409	34	32
6	KK Veternik	20	12	8	1405	1328	+ 77	32
7	OKK Vrbas	20	12	8	1462	1336	+126	32
8	KK Stara Pazova	19	11	8	1244	1161	+ 83	30
9	KK Novi Sad MT	20	8	12	1307	1338	31	28
10	KK Topola	20	7	13	1180	1342	162	27
11	KK Jedinstvo	18	8	10	1180	1114	+ 66	26
12	KK Radnički	19	6	13	1129	1187	58	25
13	KK Sport Key	24	0	24	0	480	480	0
14	KK Duga	24	0	24	0	480	480	0

== Group Central ==
Team	City	Arena	Capacity
KK Mladost Zemun	Belgrade		
KK Kolubara LA 2003	Lazarevac		
KK Parizan MT	Belgrade		
KK Torlak Aboca	Belgrade		
KK Kotež	Belgrade		
KK Beovuk 72	Belgrade		
KK Stari DIF Slodes	Belgrade		
KK Sava	Belgrade		
KK Pro Sport	Belgrade		
KK Koledž Sport Plus	Belgrade		
KK Žitko Basket	Belgrade		
KK Grocka	Belgrade		
KK Zemun	Belgrade		
KK Milan Trivić	Belgrade		

== Regular season ==
=== Serbian Second League Group Central ===
Pos	Team	P	W	L	F	A	D	Pts
1	KK Mladost	19	17	2	1646	1288	+358	36
2	KK Kolubara LA 2003	19	15	4	1470	1253	+217	34
3	KK Parizan MT	19	13	6	1562	1488	+74	32
4	KK Torlak Aboca	19	12	7	1676	1518	+158	31
5	KK Kotež	19	11	8	1611	1560	+ 51	30
6	KK Beovuk 72	19	11	8	1534	1503	+ 31	30
7	KK Stari DIF Slodes	19	10	9	1579	1597	-18	29
8	KK Sava	19	9	10	1458	1542	84	28
9	KK Pro Sport	19	9	10	1500	1532	32	28
10	KK Koledž Sport Plus	19	8	11	1493	1479	+ 14	27
11	KK Žitko Basket	19	8	11	1473	1573	100	27
12	KK Grocka	19	6	13	1461	1575	114	25
13	KK Zemun	19	4	15	1348	1547	199	23
14	KK Milan Trivić	19	0	19	1391	1747	355	19

== Group East ==
Team	City	Arena	Capacity
KK Napredak MAXI CO	Aleksinac		
KK Jablanica	Medveđa		
KK Pirot	Pirot		
KK Morava	Vladičin Han		
KK Jug	Vranje		
KK Junior	Niš		
KK Kuršumlija	Kuršumlija		
KK Mladost Zaječar	Zaječar		
KK Eko Basket	Niš		
KK Knjaževac	Knjaževac		
KK Rtanj	Boljevac		
KK Prokuplje	Prokuplje		
KK Nibak	Niš		
KK Dimitrovgrad	Dimitrovgrad		

== Regular season ==
=== Serbian Second League Group East ===
Pos	Team	P	W	L	F	A	D	Pts
1	KK Napredak MAXI CO	19	17	2	1646	1288	+358	36
2	KK Jablanica	19	15	4	1470	1253	+217	34
3	KK Pirot	19	13	6	1562	1488	+74	32
4	KK Morava	19	12	7	1676	1518	+158	31
5	KK Jug	19	11	8	1611	1560	+ 51	30
6	KK Junior	19	11	8	1534	1503	+ 31	30
7	KK Kuršumlija	19	10	9	1579	1597	-18	29
8	KK Mladost	19	9	10	1458	1542	84	28
9	KK Eko Basket	19	9	10	1500	1532	32	28
10	KK Knjaževac	19	8	11	1493	1479	+ 14	27
11	KK Rtanj	19	8	11	1473	1573	100	27
12	KK Prokuplje	19	6	13	1461	1575	114	25
13	KK Nibak	19	4	15	1348	1547	199	23
14	KK Dimitrovgrad	19	0	19	1391	1747	355	19

== Group West ==
Team	City	Arena	Capacity
KK Šabac	Šabac		
KK Priboj	Priboj		
OKK Novi Pazar	Novi Pazar		
KK Zlatar	Nova Varoš		
KK Sloga	Požega		
KK Polet Ratina	Ratina		
KK Klik	Arilje		
KK Mašinac	Kraljevo		
KK Mionica	Mionica		
KK Prva Petoletka	Trstenik		
KK Železničar	Čačak		
KK Svilajnac Kompo	Svilajnac		
KK Požarevac	Požarevac		
KK Zlatibor	Čajetina		

== Regular season ==
=== Serbian Second League Group West ===
Pos	Team	P	W	L	F	A	D	Pts
1	KK Šabac	19	17	2	1646	1288	+358	36
2	KK Priboj	19	15	4	1470	1253	+217	34
3	OKK Novi Pazar	19	13	6	1562	1488	+74	32
4	KK Zlatar	19	12	7	1676	1518	+158	31
5	KK Sloga	19	11	8	1611	1560	+ 51	30
6	KK Polet Ratina	19	11	8	1534	1503	+ 31	30
7	KK Klik	19	10	9	1579	1597	-18	29
8	KK Mašinac	19	9	10	1458	1542	84	28
9	KK Mionica	19	9	10	1500	1532	32	28
10	KK Prva Petoletka	19	8	11	1493	1479	+ 14	27
11	KK Železničar	19	8	11	1473	1573	100	27
12	KK Svilajnac Kompo	19	6	13	1461	1575	114	25
13	KK Požarevac	19	4	15	1348	1547	199	23
14	KK Zlatibor	19	0	19	1391	1747	355	19

P=Matches played, W=Matches won, L=Matches lost, F=Points for, A=Points against, D=Points difference, Pts=Points

Promotion to Basketball league of Serbia B
Relegation to Serbian Second league
