= 2014–15 Euroleague Basketball Next Generation Tournament =

Adidas NGT
- Season: 2015–16
- Teams: 32

Regular season
- Season MVP: (Slovenia) Luka Dončić

Finals
- Champions: (Spain) Real Madrid
- Runners-up: (Serbia) Crvena Zvezda

The 2014–15 Euroleague Basketball Next Generation Tournament, also called Adidas Next Generation Tournament by sponsorship reasons, was the 13th edition of the international junior basketball tournament organized by the Euroleague Basketball Company.

As in past years, 32 teams joined the first stage, which was played in four qualifying tournaments between December 2014 and February 2015. The four group winners, Crvena Zvezda Telekom as reigning champions and three wildcarded teams joined the Final Tournament, that was played in Madrid on May 14–17.

== Qualifying tournaments ==
=== Torneo Città di Roma ===
The Torneo Città di Roma was played on December 27 to 29, 2014.

==== Group A ====
Pos	Team	Pld	W	L	PF	PA	PD	STE	BRO	CED	MTA
1	(Italy) Stella Azzurra	3	3	0	186	153	+33		60–56	57–50	69–47
2	(Germany) Brose Baskets	3	2	1	200	192	+8				74–67
3	(Croatia) Cedevita Zagreb	3	1	2	192	198	−6		65–70		
4	(Israel) Maccabi Teddy Tel Aviv	3	0	3	185	220	−35			71–77	

==== Group B ====
Pos	Team	Pld	W	L	PF	PA	PD	UNI	SPA	MIL	VIR
1	(Spain) Unicaja	3	3	0	261	176	+85		82–67	91–52	
2	(Bosnia and Herzegovina) Spars Sarajevo	3	2	1	218	198	+20				
3	(Italy) Armani Junior Milan	3	1	2	193	247	−54		56–75		85–81
4	(Italy) Virtus Bologna	3	0	3	198	249	−51	57–88	60–76		

==== Classification games ====
7th place game

Maccabi Teddy Tel Aviv (Israel)	101–76	(Italy) Virtus Bologna

5th place game

Cedevita Zagreb (Croatia)	70–48	(Italy) Armani Junior Milan

3rd place game

Brose Baskets (Germany)	48–78	(Bosnia and Herzegovina) Spars Sarajevo

==== Final ====
29 December 2014
19:30

Boxscore

Stella Azzurra (Italy)	65–50	(Spain) Unicaja
Scoring by quarter: 25–7, 10–8, 15–21, 15–14
Pts: Thiam 13; Rebs: Palsson 6 Asts: La Torre, Radonjić 4 PIR: Thiam 14		Pts: Belemene 21; Rebs: Okouo 10; Asts: Aguilar 3 PIR: Uta 18

Altero Felici, Rome
Attendance: 350

=== Torneig de Bàsquet Junior Ciutat de L'Hospitalet ===
The Torneig de Bàsquet Junior Ciutat de L'Hospitalet was played on January 4 to 6, 2015.

==== Group A ====
Pos	Team	Pld	W	L	PF	PA	PD	RMB	SEV	GAL	HOS
1	(Spain) Real Madrid	3	3	0	249	142	+107		79–51	101–53	
2	(Spain) Baloncesto Sevilla	3	2	1	204	220	−16			73–62	
3	(Turkey) Galatasaray	3	1	2	183	238	−55				
4	(Spain) CB L'Hospitalet	3	0	3	181	217	−36	38–69	79–80	64–68	

==== Group B ====
Pos	Team	Pld	W	L	PF	PA	PD	FCB	UOL	JOV	ASV
1	(Spain) FC Barcelona	3	3	0	244	204	+40		76–62	86–79	
2	(Slovenia) Union Olimpija	3	1	2	215	226	−11				62–65
3	(Spain) FIATC Joventut	3	1	2	234	241	−7		85–91		
4	(France) Asvel Lyon Villeurbanne	3	1	2	192	214	−22	63–82		64–70	

==== Semifinals ====
Real Madrid (Spain)	74–48	(Slovenia) Union Olimpija

Baloncesto Sevilla (Spain)	70–74	(Spain) FC Barcelona

==== Classification games ====
7th place game

CB L'Hospitalet (Spain)	67–60	(France) Asvel Lyon Villeurbanne

5th place game

Galatasaray (Turkey)	58–97	(Spain) FIATC Joventut

No third place game was played

==== Final ====
6 January 2015
18:45

Boxscore

Real Madrid (Spain)	87–55	(Spain) FC Barcelona
Scoring by quarter: 22–14, 24–8, 22–19, 19–14
Pts: Dončić 17; Rebs: Ndiaye 14; Asts: Dončić 5 PIR: Dončić 25		Pts: Peno 18; Rebs: Diagné 6 Asts: Figueras 2 PIR: Peno 14

Pavelló L'Hospitalet Nord, L'Hospitalet de Llobregat
Attendance: 1,000
Referees: Xavier Berasaluce (ESP), Martí Chiva (ESP)

=== Kaunas International Junior Tournament ===
The Kaunas International Junior Tournament was played on January 16 to 18, 201.

==== Group A ====
Pos	Team	Pld	W	L	PF	PA	PD	ŽAL	INS	BAY	USK
1	(Lithuania) Žalgiris Kaunas	3	3	0	264	171	+93			99–64	
2	(France) INSEP	3	2	1	200	177	+23	60–76			69–50
3	(Germany) Bayern Munich	3	1	2	176	229	−53		51–71		61–59
4	(Czech Republic) USK Future Stars Praha	3	0	3	156	219	−63	47–89			

==== Group B ====
Pos	Team	Pld	W	L	PF	PA	PD	VEF	FBÜ	RYT	CSK
1	(Latvia) VEF Rīga	3	3	0	241	199	+42		71–61		
2	(Turkey) Fenerbahçe Ülker	3	2	1	244	188	+56			85–68	
3	(Lithuania) Lietuvos Rytas	3	1	2	204	237	−33	61–83			75–69
4	(Russia) CSKA Moscow	3	0	3	195	260	−65	77–87	49–98		

==== 3rd place game ====
INSEP (France)	65–57	(Turkey) Fenerbahçe Ülker

==== Final ====
18 January 2015
16:30

Boxscore

Žalgiris Kaunas (Lithuania)	87–65	(Latvia) VEF Rīga
Scoring by quarter: 21–9, 25–17, 19–28, 22–11
Pts: Echodas 21; Rebs: Birutis 14; Asts: Beliauskas 7 PIR: Birutis 32		Pts: Siliņš 23; Rebs: three players 5 Asts: Zoriks 3 PIR: Siliņš 15

Žalgiris Arena
Attendance: 2,500

=== Marko Ivković Tournament (Belgrade) ===
The Marko Ivković Tournament was played from February 27 to March 1, 2015.

==== Group A ====
Pos	Team	Pld	W	L	PF	PA	PD	CZV	ALB	VÆR	MEG
1	(Serbia) Crvena Zvezda Telekom	3	3	0	273	172	+101		96–64	97–46	
2	(Germany) Alba Berlin	3	2	1	229	246	−17				84–73
3	(Denmark) Værløse BBK	3	1	2	206	259	−53		77–81		
4	(Serbia) Mega Leks	3	0	3	216	247	−31	62–80		81–83	

==== Group B ====
Pos	Team	Pld	W	L	PF	PA	PD	PAR	ZEM	CBA	VEN
1	(Serbia) Partizan NIS	3	2	1	202	197	+5			62–56	
2	(Serbia) Zemun Belgrade	3	2	1	215	200	+15	63–69			
3	(Spain) Canarias Basketball Academy	3	1	2	185	205	−20		58–75		71–68
4	(Italy) Umana Reyer Venezia	3	1	2	219	219	0	78–71	73–77		

==== Semifinals ====
Partizan NIS (Serbia)	86–63	(Germany) Alba Berlin

Crvena Zvezda Telekom (Serbia)	94–69	(Serbia) Zemun Belgrade

==== Classification games ====
7th place game

Mega Leks (Serbia)	89–85	(Italy) Umana Reyer Venezia

5th place game

Værløse BBK (Denmark)	67–73	(Spain) Canarias Basketball Academy

3rd place game

Alba Berlin (Germany)	81–72	(Serbia) Zemun Belgrade

==== Final ====
1 March 2015
15:00

Boxscore

Partizan NIS (Serbia)	51–73	(Serbia) Crvena Zvezda Telekom
Scoring by quarter: 13–19, 18–21, 10–13, 10–20
Pts: Glišić 15; Rebs: Tanasković 8 Asts: Antić 4 PIR: Armuš, Glišić 11		Pts: Popović 14; Rebs: Kenić 11; Asts: Stojanović 5 PIR: Popović 17

Hala Basket City, Belgrade
Attendance: 700

== Final tournament ==
The Final Tournament of the Euroleague NGT was played at Polideportivo Antonio Magariños, in Madrid, Spain by the four champions of the qualifying tournaments and four wildcarded teams by the Euroleague on March 20, 2015. The Championship Game was hosted at the Barclaycard Center, hours before of the final game of the 2015 Euroleague Final Four.

=== Group A ===
Pos	Team	Pld	W	L	PF	PA	PD	RMB	INS	VEF	STE
1	(Spain) Real Madrid	3	3	0	224	161	+63		65–58		74–43
2	(France) INSEP	3	2	1	213	175	+38				85–55
3	(Latvia) VEF Rīga	3	1	2	207	216	−9	60–85	55–70		
4	(Italy) Stella Azzurra Roma	3	0	3	159	251	−92			61–92	

=== Group B ===
Pos	Team	Pld	W	L	PF	PA	PD	CZV	SPA	UNI	ŽAL
1	(Serbia) Crvena Zvezda	3	2	1	231	187	+44		95–47	73–68	
2	(Bosnia and Herzegovina) Spars Sarajevo	3	2	1	186	222	−36			70–67	
3	(Spain) Unicaja	3	1	2	213	216	−3				78–73
4	(Lithuania) Žalgiris Kaunas	3	1	2	210	210	0	72–63	60–69		

=== Final ===
17 May 2015
12:00

Boxscore

Real Madrid (Spain)	73–70	(Serbia) Crvena Zvezda Telekom
Scoring by quarter: 15–22, 24–15, 20–14, 14–19
Pts: Barreiro 19; Rebs: Dončić, N'Diaye 11; Asts: Dončić 5 PIR: Barreiro 21		Pts: Aranitović 26; Rebs: Stojanović 12; Asts: Stojanović 6 PIR: Aranitović 19
Real Madrid, champion of the 2014–15 Euroleague Basketball Next Generation Tournament

Barclaycard Center, Madrid
Attendance: 4,500
Referees: Marcin Kowalski (POL), Semen Ovinov (RUS), David Romano (ISR)
