= 2015–16 Euroleague Basketball Next Generation Tournament =

Adidas NGT
- Season: 2015–16
- Teams: 32

Regular season
- Season MVP: (Serbia) Boriša Simanić

Finals
- Champions: (Spain) FC Barcelona
- Runners-up: (Serbia) Crvena zvezda

The 2015–16 Euroleague Basketball Next Generation Tournament, also called Adidas Next Generation Tournament by sponsorship reasons, is the 14th edition of the international junior basketball tournament organized by the Euroleague Basketball Company.

As in past years, 32 teams joined the first stage, which are played in four qualifying tournaments between December 2015 and February 2016. The four group winners, Real Madrid as reigning champions and three wildcarded teams will join the Final Tournament, that will be played in Berlin on May 12–15.

== Qualifying tournaments ==
=== Torneo Città di Roma ===
The Torneo Città di Roma was played on December 27 to 29, 2015.

==== Group A ====
Pos	Team	Pld	W	L	PF	PA	PD	STE	VIR	CSK	EFS
1	(Italy) Stella Azzurra	3	3	0	207	178	+29		67–62	68–62	72–54
2	(Italy) Virtus Bologna	3	2	1	211	173	+38			68–57	81–49
3	(Russia) CSKA Moscow	3	1	2	186	181	+5				
4	(Turkey) Anadolu Efes	3	0	3	148	220	−72			45–67	

Source: Adidas NGT

==== Group B ====
Pos	Team	Pld	W	L	PF	PA	PD	MEG	MIL	UNI	VEN
1	(Serbia) Mega Leks	3	2	1	238	191	+47		74–80		
2	(Italy) Armani Junior Milan	3	2	1	242	229	+13			79–83	
3	(Spain) Unicaja	3	2	1	203	212	−9	44–87			
4	(Italy) Umana Reyer Venezia	3	0	3	185	236	−51	67–77	72–83	46–76	

Source: Adidas NGT

==== Classification games ====
7th place game

Anadolu Efes (Turkey)	55–75	(Italy) Umana Reyer Venezia

5th place game

CSKA Moscow (Russia)	62–74	(Spain) Unicaja

3rd place game

Virtus Bologna (Italy)	77–63	(Italy) Armani Junior Milan

==== Final ====
29 December 2015
18:00

Boxscore

Stella Azzurra (Italy)	71–73	(Serbia) Mega Leks
Scoring by quarter: 22–17, 15–17, 16–24, 18–15
Pts: Vitale 14; Rebs: Ulaneo 11; Asts: Trapani 11; PIR: Ulaneo 14		Pts: Aranitović 28; Rebs: Musić 8 Asts: Aranitović 4 PIR: Aranitović 27

Altero Felici, Rome
Attendance: 600

=== Torneig de Bàsquet Junior Ciutat de L'Hospitalet ===
The Torneig de Bàsquet Junior Ciutat de L'Hospitalet was played on January 4 to 6, 2016.

==== Group A ====
Pos	Team	Pld	W	L	PF	PA	PD	RMB	MAC	JOV	UOL
1	(Spain) Real Madrid	3	3	0	197	135	+62		69–49		
2	(Israel) Maccabi Teddy Tel Aviv	3	1	2	210	224	−14				82–75
3	(Spain) FIATC Joventut	3	1	2	197	208	−11	50–60	80–79		
4	(Slovenia) Union Olimpija	3	1	2	180	217	−37	36–68		69–67	

Source: Adidas NGT

==== Group B ====
Pos	Team	Pld	W	L	PF	PA	PD	FCB	BRO	HOS	SEV
1	(Spain) FC Barcelona Lassa	3	3	0	254	189	+65			89–71	
2	(Germany) Brose Baskets	3	2	1	228	196	+32	71–80			
3	(Spain) Torrons Vicens L'Hospitalet	3	1	2	195	231	−36		49–79		75–63
4	(Spain) Baloncesto Sevilla	3	0	3	177	238	−61		67–78		

Source: Adidas NGT

==== Semifinals ====
Real Madrid (Spain)	64–52	(Germany) Brose Baskets

Maccabi Teddy Tel Aviv (Israel)	52–89	(Spain) FC Barcelona Lassa

==== Classification games ====
7th place game

Union Olimpija (Slovenia)	52–83	(Spain) Baloncesto Sevilla

5th place game

FIATC Joventut (Spain)	73–82	(Spain) Torrons Vicens L'Hospitalet

No third place game was played

==== Final ====
6 January 2016
18:30

Boxscore

Real Madrid (Spain)	50–48	(Spain) FC Barcelona Lassa
Scoring by quarter: 12–9, 22–19, 9–11, 7–9
Pts: Radončić 16; Rebs: Ndiaye 16; Asts: Jovičić, Radončić 2 PIR: Ndiaye 15		Pts: Martínez 10; Rebs: Diagne 11; Asts: Carrasco, Figueras 2 PIR: Esteban 10

Pavelló L'Hospitalet Nord, L'Hospitalet de Llobregat
Attendance: 500
Referees: Carlos Dos Santos (ESP), Ernesto Olvera (ESP)

=== Kaunas International Junior Tournament ===
The Kaunas International Junior Tournament was played on January 15 to 17, 2016.

==== Group A ====
Pos	Team	Pld	W	L	PF	PA	PD	ŽAL	CIB	LUD	FNB
1	(Lithuania) Žalgiris	3	3	0	286	194	+92		104–68		
2	(Croatia) Cibona	3	2	1	237	251	−14			69–55	100–92
3	(Germany) Porsche BA Ludwigsburg	3	1	2	188	227	−39	56–88			
4	(Turkey) Fenerbahçe	3	0	3	232	271	−39	70–94		70–77	

Source: Adidas NGT
Rules for classification: 1) points; 2) goal difference; 3) number of goals scored.

==== Group B ====
Pos	Team	Pld	W	L	PF	PA	PD	LRY	IN	VEF	USK
1	(Lithuania) Lietuvos Rytas	3	3	0	247	199	+48				90–63
2	(France) INSEP	3	2	1	233	200	+33	72–74		82–75	
3	(Latvia) VEF Rīga	3	1	2	191	214	−23	64–83			
4	(Czech Republic) USK Future Stars Praha	3	0	3	163	221	−58		51–79	49–52	

Source: Adidas NGT
Rules for classification: 1) points; 2) goal difference; 3) number of goals scored.

==== 3rd place game ====
Cibona (Croatia)	71–68	(France) INSEP

==== Final ====
17 January 2016
12:30

Boxscore

Žalgiris Kaunas (Lithuania)	87–76	(Lithuania) Lietuvos Rytas
Scoring by quarter: 31–17, 17–16, 18–22, 21–21
Pts: Hartenstein 29; Rebs: Hartenstein 12; Asts: Velička 16; PIR: Hartenstein 37		Pts: Pilauskas 23; Rebs: Vaičiūnas 7 Asts: Pilauskas 4 PIR: Pilauskas 24

Žalgiris Arena
Attendance: 1,065

=== Belgrade International Junior Tournament ===
The Belgrade International Junior Tournament was played from February 26 to 28, 2016.

==== Group A ====
Pos	Team	Pld	W	L	PF	PA	PD	CZV	SPA	ALB	BUD
1	(Serbia) Crvena Zvezda Telekom	3	3	0	307	223	+84		104–67	98–78	105–78
2	(Bosnia and Herzegovina) Spars Sarajevo	3	2	1	239	256	−17			76–72	
3	(Germany) Alba Berlin	3	1	2	242	261	−19				
4	(Montenegro) Budućnost VOLI	3	0	3	245	293	−48		80–96	87–92	

==== Group B ====
Pos	Team	Pld	W	L	PF	PA	PD	CED	PAR	BAY	ZEM
1	(Croatia) Cedevita	3	3	0	268	237	+31		93–79	93–77	82–81
2	(Serbia) Partizan	3	2	1	230	223	+7			70–52	81–78
3	(Germany) Bayern Munich	3	1	2	194	216	−22				65–53
4	(Serbia) Zemun Belgrade	3	0	3	212	228	−16				

==== Semifinals ====
Crvena Zvezda Telekom (Serbia)	107–69	(Serbia) Partizan

Cedevita (Croatia)	77–104	(Bosnia and Herzegovina) Spars Sarajevo

==== Classification games ====
7th place game

Budućnost VOLI (Montenegro)	85–86	(Serbia) Zemun Belgrade

5th place game

Alba Berlin (Germany)	75–72	(Germany) Bayern Munich

3rd place game

Partizan (Serbia)	83–61	(Croatia) Cedevita

==== Final ====
28 February 2016
20:00

Boxscore

Crvena Zvezda Telekom (Serbia)	92–88	(Bosnia and Herzegovina) Spars Sarajevo
Scoring by quarter: 22–22, 25–20, 23–15, 22–31
Pts: Radanov 26; Rebs: Đorđević 15; Asts: Radanov 8 PIR: Radanov 34		Pts: Gegić, Čampara 24; Rebs: Stepanović 12; Asts: Gegić 5 PIR: Gegić 27

Železnik hall, Belgrade
Attendance: 1,500

== Final tournament ==
Alba Berlin, FC Barcelona Lassa, INSEP and Lietuvos Rytas received a wild card for joining the final tournament with the four qualifying tournament winners (title holder Real Madrid, Mega Bemax, who changed sponsorship naming from the qualifying tournament, Žalgiris and Crvena Zvezda Telekom).

All games of the Group A and the Group B played at Sportforum Hohenschönhausen. The final game was played at Mercedes-Benz Arena on the same day of the 2015–16 Euroleague Final.

=== Group A ===
Pos	Team	Pld	W	L	PF	PA	PD	FCB	INS	ŽAL	MEG
1	(Spain) FC Barcelona Lassa	3	3	0	251	211	+40		83–75		85–70
2	(France) INSEP	3	2	1	255	228	+27			83–80	
3	(Lithuania) Žalgiris	3	1	2	227	234	−7	66–83			81–68
4	(Serbia) Mega Bemax	3	0	3	203	263	−60		65–97		

Source: Adidas NGT

=== Group B ===
Pos	Team	Pld	W	L	PF	PA	PD	CZV	RMB	ALB	LRY
1	(Serbia) Crvena Zvezda Telekom	3	2	1	234	214	+20			85–68	70–77
2	(Spain) Real Madrid	3	2	1	212	209	+3	69–79		73–62	
3	(Germany) Alba Berlin	3	1	2	224	244	−20				94–86
4	(Lithuania) Lietuvos Rytas	3	1	2	231	234	−3		68–70		

Source: Adidas NGT

==== Final ====
15 May 2016
12:00

Boxscore

FC Barcelona Lassa (Spain)	90–82	(Serbia) Crvena Zvezda Telekom
Scoring by quarter: 33–17, 17–29, 20–17, 20–19
Pts: Vila 21; Rebs: Vila 8 Asts: Figueras 10; PIR: Vila 28		Pts: Radanov 23; Rebs: Simanić 6 Asts: Radanov 4 PIR: Radanov 23

Mercedes-Benz Arena, Berlin
Attendance: 916
Referees: Sérgio Silva (POR), Tomasz Trawicki (POL), Mario Majkić (SLO)
