= Aleksa Radanov =

Serbian basketball player (born 1998)

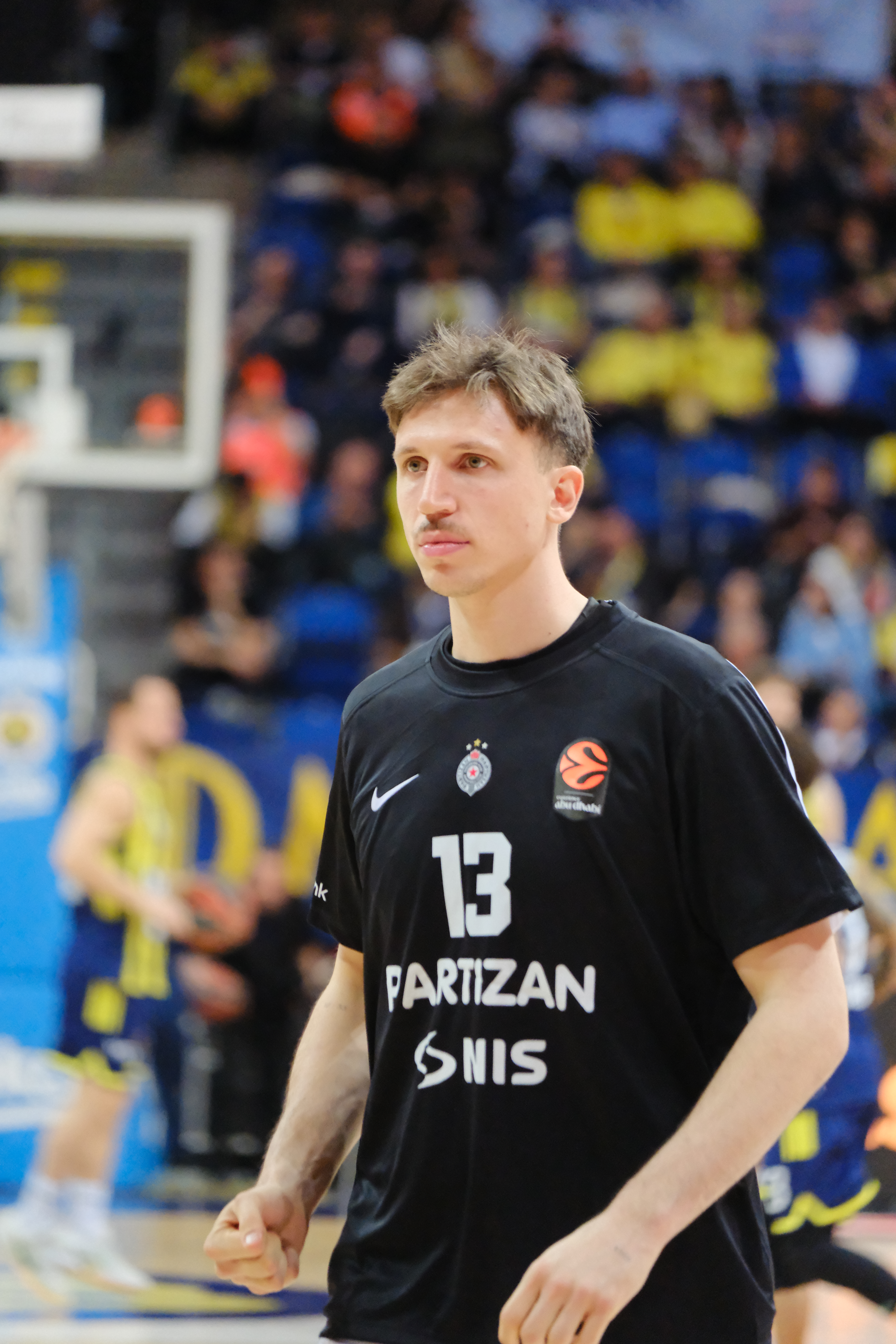
- Radanov with Partizan Belgrade in 2026

Free agent
- Position: Small forward

Personal information
- Born: February 1, 1998 (age 28) Belgrade, Serbia, FR Yugoslavia
- Listed height: 2.01 m (6 ft 7 in)
- Listed weight: 95 kg (209 lb)

Career information
- NBA draft: 2020: undrafted
- Playing career: 2015–present

Career history
- 2015–2021: Crvena zvezda
- 2015–2020: →FMP
- 2021–2022: Igokea
- 2022–2023: Peristeri
- 2023–2024: Runa Basket
- 2024: Mega
- 2025: Legia Warsaw
- 2025: Bayern Munich
- 2026: Partizan

Career highlights
- 3× ABA League champion (2015, 2019, 2021); ABA League Supercup winner (2018); 3× Serbian League champion (2018, 2019, 2021); Serbian Cup winner (2021); Bosnian League champion (2022); Bosnian Cup winner (2022); PLK champion (2025); EuroLeague IJT champion (2014)

Aleksa Radanov (Serbian Cyrillic: Алекса Раданов; born February 1, 1998) is a Serbian professional basketball player who last played for Partizan Belgrade of the Serbian SuperLeague, the ABA League and the EuroLeague.

== Early life and career ==
Radanov grew up with Crvena zvezda youth teams. He won the 2014 EuroLeague NIJT. He lost finals of the 2014–15 and 2015–16 EuroLeague NGT season.

== Professional career ==
Prior to the 2014–15 season, Radanov signed his first professional contract with Crvena zvezda. Since the 2015–16 season, he played on loan for another Serbian team FMP. In April 2018, he was recalled from loan to Crvena zvezda. In August 2019, he was loaned to FMP for the 2019–20 season. Radanov returned to Crvena zvezda on July 29, 2020, signing a two-year deal.

On 13 July 2021, Radanov signed for Bosnian club Igokea.

On 12 July 2022, Radanov signed with Peristeri Athens of the Greek Basket League. In 31 domestic league games, he averaged 5.4 points, 3.3 rebounds and 1.1 assists, playing around 19 minutes per contest. On 20 June 2023, Radanov mutually parted ways with the club.

On February 3, 2025, he signed with Legia Warsaw of the Polish Basketball League (PLK).

In September 2025, he signed for Bayern Munich of the German BBL and the EuroLeague. After limited playing time with the Germans, Radanov signed for another EuroLeague team in January 2026, Partizan of the KLS and ABA League.

== Career achievements ==
- Serbian League champion: 3 (with Crvena zvezda: 2017–18, 2018–19, 2020–21)
- Bosnian League champion: 1 (with Igokea: 2021–22)
- Adriatic League champion: 3 (with Crvena zvezda: 2014–15, 2018–19, 2020–21)
- Adriatic Supercup winner: 1 (with Crvena zvezda: 2018)
- Serbian Cup winner: 1 (with Crvena zvezda: 2020–21)
- Bosnian Cup winner: 1 (with Igokea: 2021–22)
- EuroLeague IJT champion: 1 (with Crvena zvezda U-18: 2013–14)
