= 2009–10 Euroleague Regular Season Group D =

Standings and Results for Group D of the regular season phase of the 2009–10 Euroleague basketball tournament.

== Standings ==
Key to colors
Top four places in each group advance to Top 16
Eliminated

	Team	Pld	W	L	PF	PA	Diff	Tie-break
1.	(Spain) Real Madrid	10	8	2	811	690	+121	2–0
2.	(Greece) Panathinaikos Athens	10	8	2	792	697	+95	0–2
3.	(Russia) Khimki Moscow Region	10	6	4	740	733	+7	
4.	(Poland) Asseco Prokom Gdynia	10	4	6	747	810	−63	
5.	(Italy) Armani Jeans Milano	10	3	7	724	741	−17	
6.	(Germany) EWE Baskets Oldenburg	10	1	9	657	800	−143	

== Fixtures and results ==
All times given below are in Central European Time.

Unless otherwise indicated, all attendance totals are from the corresponding match report posted on the official Euroleague site and included with each game summary.

=== Game 1 ===
21 October 2009
19:45 CET

Report

Asseco Prokom Gdynia (Poland)	81–87	(Germany) EWE Baskets Oldenburg
Scoring by quarter: 21-24, 23-22, 17-16, 20-25
Pts: Woods 23; Rebs: Woods 14; Asts: Logan 6		Pts: Paulding 23; Rebs: Majstorović, Perković 8 Asts: Foster 6

Gdynia Sports Arena
Attendance: 3,250
Referees: Ilija Belošević (SRB), Carmelo Paternico (ITA), Panagiotis Anastopoulos (GRE)

22 October 2009
18:00 CET

Report

Khimki Moscow Region (Russia)	84–81 (OT) (OT)	(Spain) Real Madrid
Scoring by quarter: 17-14, 22-18, 14-20, 19-20, Overtime: 12-9
Pts: Cabezas 20; Rebs: Jankūnas 11; Asts: Langford, Cabezas 3		Pts: Lavrinovič 32; Rebs: Lavrinovič 11; Asts: Prigioni 6

Basketball Center of Moscow Region
Attendance: 4,900
Referees: Fabio Facchini (ITA), Fernando Rocha (POR), Olegs Latisevs (LAT)

22 October 2009
20:30 CET

Report

Armani Jeans Milano (Italy)	67–75	(Greece) Panathinaikos Athens
Scoring by quarter: 22-21, 16-14, 14-21, 15-19
Pts: Finley 13; Rebs: Acker, Finley, Hall 5 Asts: Acker 4		Pts: Spanoulis 19; Rebs: Peković 6 Asts: Spanoulis 5

Mediolanum Forum
Attendance: 1,500
Referees: Dani Hierrezuelo (ESP), Matej Boltauzer (SLO), Sreten Radović (CRO)

=== Game 2 ===
28 October 2009
20:00

Report

EWE Baskets Oldenburg (Germany)	70–79	(Italy) Armani Jeans Milano
Scoring by quarter: 16-11, 19-23, 16-15, 19-30
Pts: Foster 20; Rebs: Perković 6 Asts: Foster 3		Pts: Mačiulis 18; Rebs: Rocca 6 Asts: Hall 5

Weser-Ems-Halle
Attendance: 2,874
Referees: Juan Carlos Arteaga (ESP), Dubravko Muhvić (CRO), Vicente Bulto (ESP)

28 October 2009
20:45 CET

Report

Real Madrid (Spain)	94–72	(Poland) Asseco Prokom Gdynia
Scoring by quarter: 30-22, 21-11, 17-12, 26-27
Pts: Lavrinovič 19; Rebs: Lavrinovič 5 Asts: Lavrinovič 5 Steals: Lavrinovič 4		Pts: Woods 22; Rebs: Burrell 13; Asts: Woods, Ewing 4 Steals: Logan 4

Palacio Vistalegre
Attendance: 5,800
Referees: Volodymr Drabikovsky(UKR), Milivoje Jovčić (SRB), Zdravco Rutesic (MNE)

29 October 2009
20:15

Report

Panathinaikos Athens (Greece)	101–66	(Russia) Khimki Moscow Region
Scoring by quarter: 28-14, 23-11, 21-25, 29-16
Pts: Diamantidis 22; Rebs: Diamantidis 5 Asts: Spanoulis, Calathes 6		Pts: Langford 14; Rebs: Jankūnas 6 Asts: López 3

Olympic Indoor Hall
Attendance: 10,000
Referees: Shmuel Bachar (ISR), Sradan Dozai (CRO), Emilio Pérez Pizarro (ESP)

=== Game 3 ===
4 November 2009
18:00

Report

Khimki Moscow Region (Russia)	77–72	(Germany) EWE Baskets Oldenburg
Scoring by quarter: 24-9, 12-33, 19-13, 22-17
Pts: Jankūnas 23; Rebs: Jankūnas 7 Asts: López 5		Pts: Foster 17; Rebs: Majstorović, Carter 5 Asts: Foster, Paulding 6

Khimki Moscow Region
Attendance: 3,000
Referees: Leonidas Spiridonos (GRE), Tomas Jasevicius (LTU), Tolga Sahin(TUR)

4 November 2009
20:15

Report

Asseco Prokom Gdynia (Poland)	88–83	(Italy) Armani Jeans Milano
Scoring by quarter: 16-25, 27-14, 21-21, 24-23
Pts: Logan 23; Rebs: Sow 10; Asts: Jagla 4		Pts: Finley 25; Rebs: Mancinelli, Hall 6 Asts: Mačiulis 5

Gdynia Sports Arena
Attendance: 3,353
Referees: Jose Ramon Garcia Ortiz (ESP), Spiros Gontas (GRE), Oskars Lucis (LAT)

5 November 2009
20:45

Report

Real Madrid (Spain)	80–70	(Greece) Panathinaikos Athens
Scoring by quarter: 12-21, 22-7, 25-23, 21-19
Pts: Kaukėnas 17; Rebs: Lavrinovič 5 Asts: Veličković, Llull 4		Pts: Peković 22; Rebs: Peković 7 Asts: Spanoulis 6

Palacio Vistalegre
Attendance: 12,500
Referees: Romualdas Brazauskas (LTU), Borys Ryzhyk (UKR), Eddie Viator (FRA)

=== Game 4 ===
11 November 2009
19:45

Report

Asseco Prokom Gdynia (Poland)	65–75	(Greece) Panathinaikos Athens
Scoring by quarter: 13-25, 20-20, 11-20, 21-10
Pts: Jagla 17; Rebs: Jagla 7 Asts: Logan 5		Pts: Nicholas, Peković 17; Rebs: Fotsis, Nicholas 7 Asts: Spanoulis 5

Gdynia Sports Arena
Attendance: 4,100
Referees: Fabio Facchini (ITA), Dubravko Muhvic (CRO), Robert Lottermoser (GER)

11 November 2009
20:00

Report

EWE Baskets Oldenburg (Germany)	61–104	(Spain) Real Madrid
Scoring by quarter: 16-28, 21-30, 13-27, 11-19
Pts: Foster 16; Rebs: Scekic, Majstorović 6 Asts: Scekic, Paulding 2		Pts: Lavrinovič 18; Rebs: Garbajosa, Dašić 5 Asts: Veličković 6

Weser-Ems-Halle
Attendance: 4,104
Referees: Christos Christodoulou (GRE), Spiros Gontas (GRE), Roman Kolar (SLO)

12 November 2009
20:30

Report

Armani Jeans Milano (Italy)	68–72	(Russia) Khimki Moscow Region
Scoring by quarter: 19-16, 16-15, 15-18, 18-23
Pts: Finley 19; Rebs: Hall, Rocca 6 Asts: Finley 3		Pts: Langford 17; Rebs: Langford 5 Asts: Langford, Cabezas 3

Mediolanum Forum
Attendance: 2,059
Referees: Juan Carlos Mitjana (ESP), Sasa Maricic (SRB), David Chambon (FRA)

=== Game 5 ===
25 November 2009
18:00

Report

Khimki Moscow Region (Russia)	89–67	(Poland) Asseco Prokom Gdynia
Scoring by quarter: 22-20, 22-16, 17-12, 28-19
Pts: McCarty 22; Rebs: five players with 5 Asts: Langford 9		Pts: Sow 18; Rebs: Woods 7 Asts: Harrington, Woods 4

Basketball Center of Moscow Region
Attendance: 3,000
Referees: José Martín (ESP), Siniša Herceg (CRO), Matej Boltauzer (SLO)

25 November 2009
18:30

Report

Panathinaikos Athens (Greece)	96–63	(Germany) EWE Baskets Oldenburg
Scoring by quarter: 23-21, 13-21, 30-14, 30-7
Pts: Batiste 25; Rebs: Batiste 6 Asts: Calathes 6		Pts: Bailey, Carter 12; Rebs: Scekic 14; Asts: Paulding 3

Olympic Indoor Hall
Attendance: 4,600
Referees: Luigi Lamonica (ITA), Recep Ankarali (TUR), Gianluca Mattioli (ITA)

26 November 2009
20:45

Report

Real Madrid (Spain)	82–69	(Italy) Armani Jeans Milano
Scoring by quarter: 21-22, 15-23, 22-13, 24-11
Pts: Veličković 21; Rebs: Veličković, Garbajosa 7 Asts: Kaukėnas, Llull 4		Pts: Mačiulis 20; Rebs: Hall, Rocca 6 Asts: Mordente 4

Palacio Vistalegre
Attendance: 7,900
Referees: Grzegorz Ziemblicki (POL), Marek Cmikiewicz (POL), Panagiotis Anastopoulos (GRE)

=== Game 6 ===
2 December 2009
20:45

Report

Real Madrid (Spain)	70–59	(Russia) Khimki Moscow Region
Scoring by quarter: 12-13, 19-15, 19-17, 20-14
Pts: Garbajosa 13; Rebs: Veličković 7 Asts: Prigioni 7		Pts: Javtokas 17; Rebs: Javtokas 9 Asts: López 5

Palacio Vistalegre
Attendance: 10,800
Referees: Carl Jungebrand (FIN), Sreten Radović (CRO), Jakub Zamojski (POL)

3 December 2009
18:00

Report

Panathinaikos Athens (Greece)	80–68	(Italy) Armani Jeans Milano
Scoring by quarter: 27-12, 17-20, 19-16, 17-20
Pts: Peković 16; Rebs: Fotsis 8 Asts: Diamantidis, Jasikevičius 3		Pts: Mačiulis 17; Rebs: Hall 5 Asts: Bulleri, Viggiano 3

Athens Olympic Sports Complex
Attendance: 4,850
Referees: Volodymr Drabikovsky (UKR), Siniša Herceg (CRO), Sergey Mikhaylov (RUS)

3 December 2009
20:00

Report

EWE Baskets Oldenburg (Germany)	80–82	(Poland) Asseco Prokom Gdynia
Scoring by quarter: 20-21, 21-15, 20-28, 19-18
Pts: Perković 12; Rebs: Majstorović 6 Asts: Foster 4		Pts: Woods 25; Rebs: Sow 12; Asts: Logan 8

AWD-Dome
Attendance: 2,400
Referees: Lazaros Voreadis (GRE), Eddie Viator (FRA), Sergiy Zashchuck (UKR)

=== Game 7 ===
9 December 2009
18:00

Report

Khimki Moscow Region (Russia)	82–87 (OT)	(Greece) Panathinaikos Athens
Scoring by quarter: 20-21, 20-21, 17-17, 16-14, Overtime: 9-14
Pts: McCarty 21; Rebs: McCarty 11; Asts: Fridzon, López 7		Pts: Spanoulis 24; Rebs: Perperoglou, Fotsis 6 Asts: Spanoulis, Diamantidis

Basketball Center of Moscow Region
Attendance: 4,000
Referees: Zoran Šutulović (MNE), Jose Ramon Garcia Ortiz (ESP), Olegs Latisevs (LAT)

9 December 2009
19:45

Report

Asseco Prokom Gdynia (Poland)	82–76	(Spain) Real Madrid
Scoring by quarter: 24-21, 22-22, 16-18, 20-15
Pts: Woods 27; Rebs: Woods, Hrycaniuk 5 Asts: Logan, Ewing 4		Pts: Reyes 16; Rebs: Garbajosa 9 Asts: Prigioni 5

Gdynia Sports Arena
Attendance: 4,300
Referees: Luigi Lamonica (ITA), Milivoje Jovčić (SRB), Luis Lopes (POR)

9 December 2009
20:30

Report

Armani Jeans Milano (Italy)	79–51	(Germany) EWE Baskets Oldenburg
Scoring by quarter: 23-16, 18-13, 18-5, 20-17
Pts: Petravičius 16; Rebs: Mačiulis 8 Asts: Bulleri 5		Pts: Foster 10; Rebs: Carter 5 Asts: Paulding 3

Mediolanum Forum
Attendance: 1,784
Referees: Ilija Belošević (SRB), Jakub Zamojski (POL), Tomas Jasevicius (LTU)

=== Game 8 ===
16 December 2009
20:00

Report

EWE Baskets Oldenburg (Germany)	49–62	(Russia) Khimki Moscow Region
Scoring by quarter: 8-14, 18-17, 9-18, 14-13
Pts: Perkovic 18; Rebs: Boumtje-Boumtje 7 Asts: Bailey 3		Pts: Langford 19; Rebs: Javtokas 10; Asts: Fridzon, Cabezas, McCarty 2

Weser-Ems-Halle
Attendance: 3,065
Referees: Grzegorz Ziemblicki (POL), Roberto Chiari (ITA), Andrej Lovsyn (SLO)

17 December 2009
19:00

Report

Panathinaikos Athens (Greece)	67–76	(Spain) Real Madrid
Scoring by quarter: 8-22, 19-17, 18-24, 22-13
Pts: Nicholas 12; Rebs: Fotsis 10; Asts: Nicholas 5		Pts: Bullock 15; Rebs: Lavrinovič 8 Asts: Prigioni, Kaukėnas 3

Olympic Indoor Hall
Attendance: 15,200
Referees: Carl Jungebrand (FIN), Fernando Rocha (POR), Eddie Viator (FRA)

17 December 2009
20:30

Report

Armani Jeans Milano (Italy)	82–69	(Poland) Asseco Prokom Gdynia
Scoring by quarter: 20-16, 22-12, 17-21, 23-20
Pts: Finley 20; Rebs: Rocca, Petravičius 7 Asts: Mordente 3		Pts: Ewing 21; Rebs: Lapeta, Woods 8 Asts: Ewing 3

Mediolanum Forum
Attendance: 2,711
Referees: Saša Pukl (SLO), Juan Carlos Garcia Gonzalez (ESP), Robert Vyklicky (CZE)

=== Game 9 ===
6 January 2010
18:15

Report

Panathinaikos Athens (Greece)	74–66	(Poland) Asseco Prokom Gdynia
Scoring by quarter: 23-18, 13-20, 15-12, 23-16
Pts: Batiste, Nicholas 13; Rebs: Fotsis 6 Asts: Spanoulis 5		Pts: Ewing 19; Rebs: Varda 9 Asts: Logan, Varda, Woods 3

Athens Olympic Sports Complex
Attendance: 7,500
Referees: Dani Hierrezuelo (ESP), Sradan Dozai (CRO), Oliver Krause (GER)

6 January 2010
20:45

Report

Real Madrid (Spain)	73–60	(Germany) EWE Baskets Oldenburg
Scoring by quarter: 17-20, 17-10, 24-17, 15-13
Pts: Lavrinovič 16; Rebs: Jarić 8 Asts: Prigioni 4		Pts: Paulding 12; Rebs: Boumtje-Boumtje 8 Asts: Foster 4

Palacio Vistalegre
Attendance: 6,400
Referees: Zoran Šutulović (MNE), Murat Biricik (TUR), Damir Javor (SLO)

7 January 2010
18:00

Report

Khimki Moscow Region (Russia)	79–63	(Italy) Armani Jeans Milano
Scoring by quarter: 19-20, 20-18, 20-10, 20-15
Pts: Langford 18; Rebs: Javtokas, McCarty 9 Asts: Langford 5		Pts: Rocca 17; Rebs: Rocca 7 Asts: Finley 3

Basketball Center of Moscow Region
Attendance: 4,000
Referees: Costas Mouzakis (GRE), Milivoje Jovčić (SRB), Elias Koromilas (GRE)

=== Game 10 ===
13 January 2010
20:30

Report

Asseco Prokom Gdynia (Poland)	75–70	(Russia) Khimki Moscow Region
Scoring by quarter: 22-21, 23-8, 10-23, 20-18
Pts: Logan 24; Rebs: Woods 7 Asts: Ewing 4		Pts: McCarty 22; Rebs: Jankūnas 10; Asts: López 5

Gdynia Sports Arena
Attendance: 5,000
Referees: Juan Carlos Arteaga (ESP), Vicente Bulto (ESP), Apostolos Kalpakas (SWE),

13 January 2010
20:30

Report

Armani Jeans Milano (Italy)	66–75	(Spain) Real Madrid
Scoring by quarter: 19-16, 20-16, 13-22, 14-21
Pts: Mancinelli 18; Rebs: Viggiano 9 Asts: four players with 2		Pts: Kaukėnas 12; Rebs: Reyes 8 Asts: four players with 2

Mediolanum Forum
Attendance: 4,886
Referees: Romualdas Brazauskas (LTU), Milija Vojinovic (SRB), Olegs Latisevs (LAT)

13 January 2010
20:30

Report

EWE Baskets Oldenburg (Germany)	64–67	(Greece) Panathinaikos Athens
Scoring by quarter: 10-20, 15-13, 24-17, 15-17
Pts: Paulding 19; Rebs: Majstorović 9 Asts: Foster, Gardner 4		Pts: Batiste 21; Rebs: Batiste 9 Asts: Nicholas, Calathes 3

Weser-Ems-Halle
Attendance: 3,637
Referees: Saša Pukl (SLO), Paolo Taurino (ITA), Jasmina Juras (SRB)
