= Miloš Ćojbašić =

Serbian basketball player

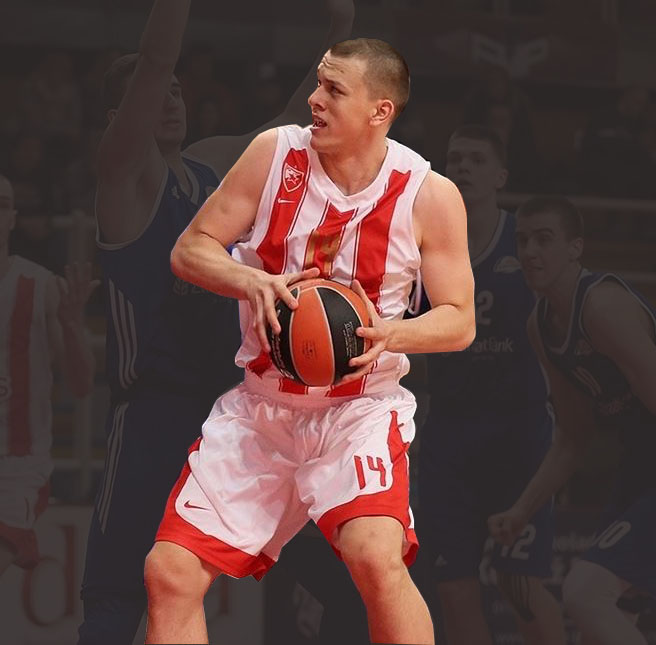
- Milos Cojbasic, center, 206cm, 115kg

No. 11 – Shumen
- Position: Power forward / center
- League: NBL (Bulgaria)

Personal information
- Born: August 11, 2000 (age 26) Belgrade, Serbia, FR Yugoslavia
- Listed height: 2.06 m (6 ft 9 in)
- Listed weight: 115 kg (254 lb)

Career information
- Playing career: 2018–present

Career history
- 2018–2019: Crvena zvezda mts
- 2018–2019: → Žarkovo
- 2019: Sloga Tundja Yambol
- 2019–2020: Cherno More Ticha Varna
- 2020–2021: Kolubara LA 2003
- 2021–2022: BC Shumen
- 2022: KK Beko
- 2023-: [BEEFMAN.EXE 3X3 Yokohama]]

Miloš Ćojbašić (Serbian Cyrillic: Милош Ћоjбашић; born August 11, 2000) is a Serbian professional basketball player for Shumen of the National Basketball League of Bulgaria.

== Early career ==
Ćojbašić started playing basketball for KK Borča in Belgrade. In 2016, he joined KK Zemun. In summer 2017, he became a member of Crvena zvezda youth system. With Crvena Zvezda he was 2 time Champion in Serbian championship league. Ćojbašić also won the second place at the 2017–18 Junior ABA League season with the Crvena Zvezda. Over six tournament games, he averaged 5.2 points and 1.8 rebounds per game. He also won the second place at the 2018–19 Junior ABA League season with the Crvena Zvezda.

== Professional career ==
In January 2018, Ćojbašić signed his first professional contract with Crvena zvezda and he played for Crvena zvezda youth system. In August 2018, he was loaned out to Žarkovo of the Second League of Serbia.

In August 2019, Ćojbašić was added to Sloga of the Second League of Serbia. After three months Ćojbašić signed with the Bulgarian club Tundja Yambol. However, a few months čater he joined Cherno More Ticha Varna.

In December 2020, Ćojbašić signed with Kolubara LA 2003.

In September 2021, Miloš Ćojbašić signed 1 year contract with Shumen.

In 2022, Miloš Ćojbašić signed 1 year contract with KK Beko.

In 2023, Miloš Ćojbašić signed 1 year contract with BEEFMAN.EXE 3X3, in Yokohama, Japan.
