= KK Crvena zvezda (youth) =

Youth system basketball team in Belgrade, Serbia

Crvena zvezda
- Nickname: Crveno-beli (The Red-Whites); Zvezda (The Star)
- Leagues: U19 ABA Championship; First Regional League
- Location: Belgrade, Serbia
- Team colors: Red, white
- Main sponsor: Mobile Telephony of Serbia
- President: Nebojša Čović
- Team manager: Jovica Antonić
- Head coach: Branko Jorović (U19); Miloš Šakota (U16)
- Championships: 1 EuroLeague NGT
- Website: kkcrvenazvezda.rs
Home	Away

KK Crvena zvezda is a men's professional basketball club based in Belgrade, Serbia, which has youth system teams, cadets (under-16) and juniors (under-18 and under-19). The U18 and U19 teams play in the RODA Junior Basketball League of Serbia and the Junior Adriatic League. They have won a Euroleague Basketball Next Generation Tournament. The U16 team plays in the Triglav Cadet Basketball League of Serbia.

Some of the most notable home-grown players of Crvena zvezda are Zoran Slavnić, a member of the 50 greatest players in the history of FIBA international basketball, as selected in 1991, then Igor Rakočević – the three-time EuroLeague Top Scorer, Peja Stojaković – the NBA All-Star player and FIBA EuroBasket MVP, as well as Vladimir Cvetković and Dragan Kapičić.

Further notable home-grown players include Goran Rakočević, Ivan Sarjanović, Žarko Koprivica, Slobodan Nikolić, Predrag Bogosavljev, Boban Janković, Mirko Milićević, Branislav Prelević, Aleksandar Trifunović, Nebojša Ilić, Saša Obradović, Rastko Cvetković, Nikola Jestratijević, Miloš Vujanić, Vladimir Radmanović, Milutin Aleksić, Milko Bjelica, Luka Bogdanović, Tadija Dragićević, Nemanja Nedović, Marko Gudurić, and Ognjen Dobrić.

Aleksandar Đorđević (one of 50 Greatest EuroLeague Contributors), Dejan Koturović, Marko Jarić and Vladimir Micov were members of the club's youth system who have never appeared in a regular season or playoff game for the first team.

== History ==
In 2014, Crvena zvezda captured its first Euroleague Basketball Nike International Junior Tournament title by beating Real Madrid 55–42 in the final Sunday at Mediolanim Forum in Milan. The team was coached by Stevan Mijović and featured Stefan Kenić, Jovan Anđelković, Danilo Ostojić, Vojislav Stojanović, Nikola Rakićević, Bratislav Jerković, Aleksa Radanov, David Miladinović, Marko Radovanović, Boriša Simanić, Aleksandar Aranitović, Stefan Lazarević.

In the 2014–15 Euroleague NGT season Finals, Crvena zvezda got defeated Real Madrid with 70–73. The team was coached by Slobodan Klipa and featured Ivan Ćorović, Nemanja Kapetanović, Aleksandar Aranitović, Vojislav Stojanović, Aleksa Radanov, Stefan Kenić, Jovan Drljača, David Miladinović, Nikola Popović, Boriša Simanić, Nikola Rakićević, and Matija Radović.

In the 2015–16 Euroleague NGT season Finals, Crvena zvezda got defeated FC Barcelona Lassa with 82–90. The team was coached by Branko Maksimović and featured Petar Rebić, Aleksa Uskoković, Ivan Ćorović, Milan Radaković, Uroš Ilić, Stefan Momirov, Srećko Gašić, Boriša Simanić, Aleksa Radanov, Matija Radović, Stefan Đorđević and Vladimir Kovačević. Boriša Simanić won the MVP Finals Award.

The U19 team joined the 3rd-tier First Regional League – Center for the 2021–22 season.

== Players ==
=== Current U19 roster ===
Crvena zvezda mts roster
Players
Coaches

Pos.	No.	Nat.	Name	Ht.	Age
SG	7	(Serbia)	Dabić, Vasilije	1.90 m (6 ft 3 in)	21 – 13 January 2005
F		(Serbia)	Đoković, Lazar	2.07 m (6 ft 9 in)	22 – 15 April 2004
C	5	(Serbia)	Gačić, Lazar	2.12 m (6 ft 11 in)	21 – 31 January 2005
G/F		(Serbia)	Gagić, Lazar	1.97 m (6 ft 6 in)	20 – 1 August 2005
		(Serbia)	Lukić, Ognjen		20 – 5 June 2005
F		(Serbia)	Lutovac, Bogdan	1.95 m (6 ft 5 in)	21 – 8 January 2005
F/C		(Serbia)	Marjanac, Đorđe		21 – 11 September 2004
PF	11	(Serbia)	Mišić, Pavle	2.09 m (6 ft 10 in)	20 – 5 October 2005
PG	9	(Montenegro)	Pavlović, Vladimir	1.87 m (6 ft 2 in)	21 – 27 July 2004
G/F	6	(Serbia)	Radaković, Filip	2.00 m (6 ft 7 in)	22 – 7 May 2004
F	14	(Serbia)	Radojević, Andrija	2.04 m (6 ft 8 in)	21 – 22 June 2004
G	4	(Serbia)	Topić, Nikola	1.98 m (6 ft 6 in)	20 – 10 August 2005

Head coach

- (Serbia) Branko Jorović

Assistant coach(es)

- (Serbia) Bojan Đerić
- (Serbia) Milan Majstorović

Legend

- (C) Team captain
- Injured

- Roster
Updated: August 17, 2022

=== Current U16 roster ===
Crvena zvezda mts roster
Players
Coaches

Pos.	No.	Nat.	Name	Ht.	Age
		(Serbia)	Bjelica, Novak		20 – 19 March 2006
		(Serbia)	Cvijetić, Vladimir		19 – 26 January 2007
		(Serbia)	Kontić, Vladimir		20 – 6 January 2006
SG		(Serbia)	Kostić, Andrej	1.93 m (6 ft 4 in)	19 – 2 November 2006
		(Serbia)	Lučić, Andrej		19 – 6 January 2007
		(Serbia)	Milosavljević, Dušan		19 – 12 February 2007
PF	10	(Serbia)	Mišić, Pavle	2.09 m (6 ft 10 in)	20 – 5 October 2005
		(Serbia)	Pamučina, Aleksa		21 – 26 January 2005
	5	(Serbia)	Radovanović, Relja		21 – 5 May 2005
		(Montenegro)	Radulović, Bodin		19 – 22 July 2006
SF		(Serbia)	Romčević, Uroš	2.03 m (6 ft 8 in)	20 – 10 March 2006
F		(Serbia)	Spasojević, Damjan	2.03 m (6 ft 8 in)	19 – 26 June 2006
		(Serbia)	Vitorović, Matija		20 – 2 February 2006

Head coach

- (Greece) Miloš Šakota

Assistant coach(es)

- (Serbia) Marko Lalić

Legend

- (C) Team captain
- Injured

- Roster
Updated: August 17, 2022

== Staff ==
=== Current members ===
Youth system coordinator		(Serbia) Jovica Antonić
U19	Head coach	(Serbia) Branko Jorović
U19	Assistant coaches	(Serbia) Bojan Đerić
U19	Assistant coaches	(Serbia) Milan Majstorović
U16	Head coach	(Greece) Miloš Šakota
U16	Assistant coach	(Serbia) Marko Lalić
U14	Head coach	(Serbia) Nemanja Novašikić
U14	Assistant coach	(Serbia) Nebojša Stanojević

=== Notable coaches ===
- (Socialist Federal Republic of Yugoslavia) Milan Bjegojević
- (Socialist Federal Republic of Yugoslavia) Mile Protić
- (Socialist Federal Republic of Yugoslavia) Božidar Maljković
- (Socialist Federal Republic of Yugoslavia) Vladislav Lučić
- (Socialist Federal Republic of Yugoslavia) Marin Sedlaček
- (Serbia and Montenegro) Stevan Karadžić
- (Serbia and Montenegro) Darko Rajaković
- (Serbia) Slobodan Klipa

=== Youth system coordinators ===
- (Serbia and Montenegro) (Serbia) Marin Sedlaček (2003–2007)
- (Serbia) Slobodan Klipa (2016–2022)
- (Serbia) Jovica Antonić (2022–present)

== Season-by-season ==
The U19 roster competed in the senior league system:

Season	Tier	Division	Pos.	Postseason	W–L	Rf.
2006–07						
2007–08
2008–09	2	BLS First B League	10	—	11–15	
2009–10						
2010–11
2011–12
2012–13
2013–14
2014–15
2015–16
2016–17
2017–18
2018–19
2019–20
2020–21
2021–22	3	BLS 1 Regional League	2	4th place	21–7	

== Trophies and awards ==
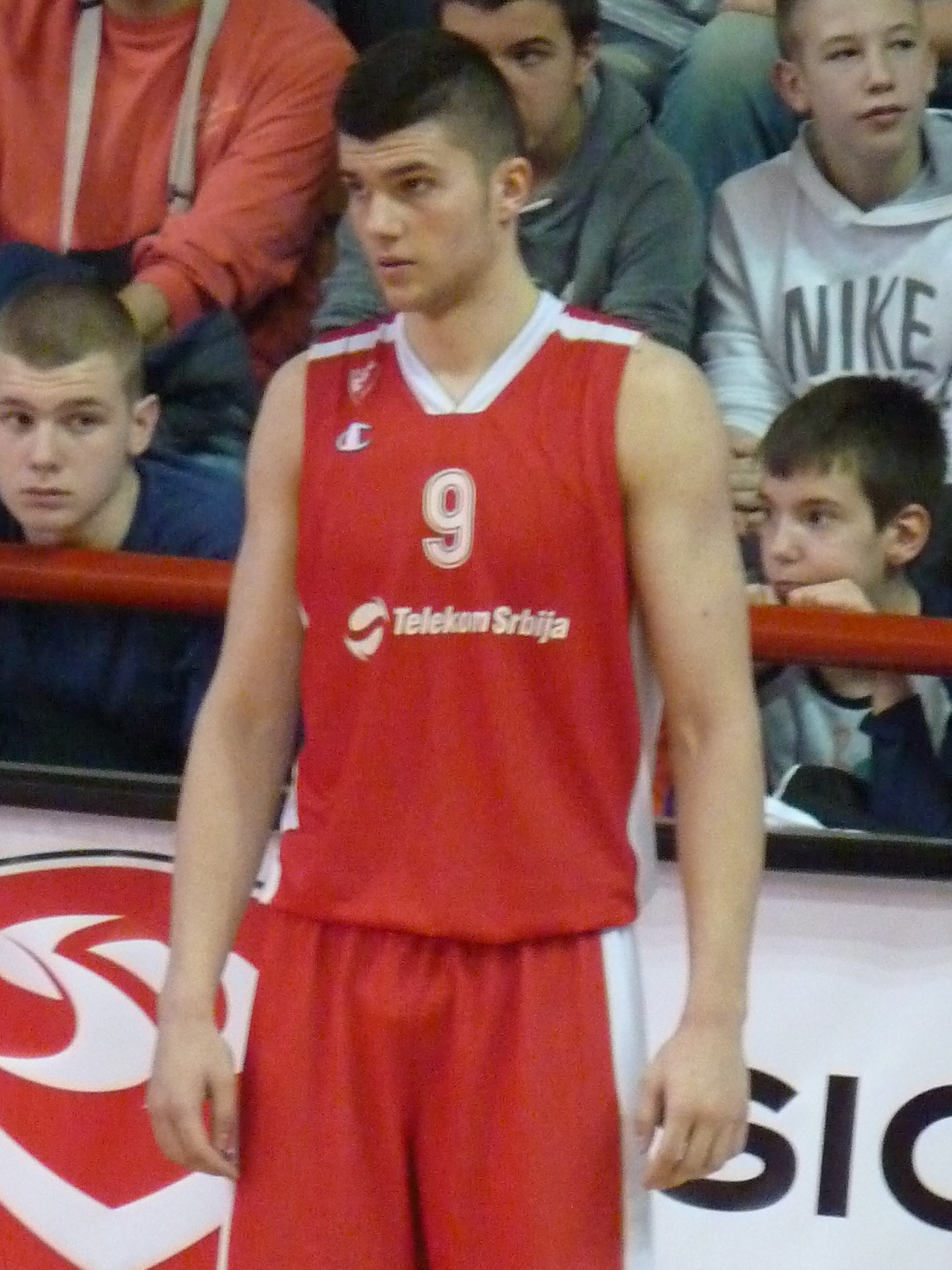
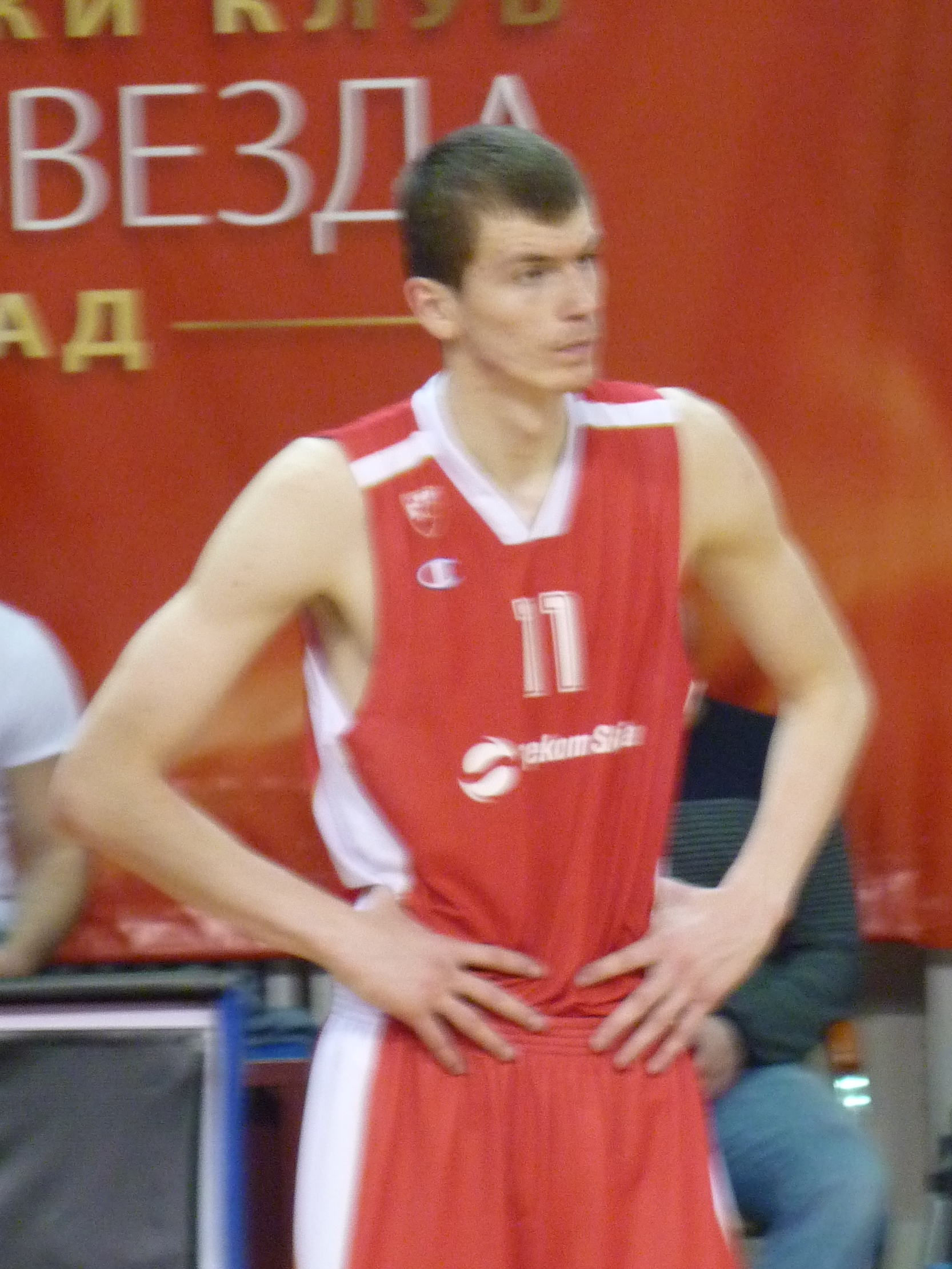
Vojislav Stojanović (left) and Boriša Simanić (right) are the only Crvena zvezda U-18 players who won Euroleague NGT Finals MVP award.

=== Trophies ===
- Euroleague NGT
  - Winners (1): 2013–14
  - Runners-up (2): 2014–15, 2015–16
- Junior ABA League
  - Runners-up (4): 2017–18, 2018–19, 2022-23, 2025-26
- Junior Basketball League of Serbia
  - Winners (7): 1993, 1998, 2007–08, 2014–15, 2016–17, 2017–18, 2018–19
- Cadets Basketball League of Serbia
  - Winners (7): 1993, 1997, 2013, 2014, 2015, 2016–17, 2017–18
- Pioneer Basketball league of Serbia
  - Winners (8): 2003, 2012, 2013, 2015, 2018, 2023, 2025, 2026
- Pioneer Serbian Cup
  - Winners (2): 2019, 2020
- Pioneer European Cup
  - Winners (1): 2011
- Junior Basketball League of Yugoslavia (defunct)
  - Winners (10): 1948, 1949, 1952, 1953, 1955, 1957, 1963, 1967, 1978, 1984
- Cadets Basketball League of Yugoslavia (defunct)
  - Winners (4): 1973, 1974, 1975, 1985

=== Awards ===
- Euroleague NGT Finals MVP (2)
  - (Serbia) Vojislav Stojanović – 2014
  - (Serbia) Boriša Simanić – 2016
- Junior Basketball League of Serbia Finals MVP
  - (Montenegro) Bojan Tomašević – 2019
