= PBC CSKA Junior =

CSKA Junior
- Leagues: VTB United Youth League
- Founded: 1991; 34 years ago
- History: CSKA-2 (1991–2017); CSKA Junior (2017-present)
- Arena: Universal Sports Hall CSKA (capacity: 5,000)
- Location: Moscow, Russia
- Team colors: Red, Blue
- President: Andrey Vatutin
- Head coach: Maksim Sharafan
- Affiliation(s): CSKA Moscow
- Championships: 3 EuroLeague NGT; 4 VTB United Youth League; 22 Russian Youth Basketball Championship
- Website: cskabasket.com
| Home | Away | Third |

PBC CSKA Junior, formerly known as CSKA-2, is the youth team of the basketball club CSKA Moscow and is based in Moscow, Russia. The team currently competes in VTB United Youth League.

CSKA Junior is the most successful team in Euroleague NGT, having won the tournament 3 times in a row.

Club plays its home games in Universal Sports Hall CSKA.

== Honours and achievements ==
=== Club ===
- Euroleague NGT
  - Winners (3): 2003–04, 2004–05, 2005–06
- VTB United Youth League
  - Champions (4): 2014–15, 2015–16, 2016–17, 2017-18
  - Runners-up (1): 2018–19
- Russian Youth Basketball Championship
  - Champions (22): 1991–2012
- Russian Youth SuperCup
  - Winners (1): 2015
- Galis Basketball (friendly)
  - Winners (1): 2019

=== Individual ===
- Euroleague NGT Finals MVP
  - (Russia) Vasiliy Zavoruev – 2004
  - (Russia) Vasiliy Zavoruev – 2005
  - (Russia) Ivan Nelyubov – 2006

== Roster ==
CSKA Junior roster
Players
Coaches

| Pos. | No. | Nat. | Name | Ht. | Wt. | Age |
|---|---|---|---|---|---|---|
| SF | 19 | (Russia) | Pokhodyayev, Danila | 1.99 m (6 ft 6 in) | 92 kg (203 lb) | 24 – 4 February 2001 |
| PF | 20 | (Russia) | Kochergin, Daniil | 2.03 m (6 ft 8 in) | 79 kg (174 lb) | 25 – 29 October 1999 |
| C | 21 | (Russia) | Lakhin, Vasiliy | 2.10 m (6 ft 11 in) | 97 kg (214 lb) | 26 – 7 January 1999 |
| SF | 24 | (Russia) | Soldatov, Nikita | 1.99 m (6 ft 6 in) | 92 kg (203 lb) | 26 – 26 February 1999 |
| PF | 25 | (Russia) | Gafurov, Filipp | 2.05 m (6 ft 9 in) | 80 kg (176 lb) | 23 – 23 June 2001 |
| PG | 26 | (Russia) | Kovalyov, Denis | 1.87 m (6 ft 2 in) | 72 kg (159 lb) | 23 – 30 June 2001 |
| F | 27 | (Russia) | Dolinin, Sergey | 2.03 m (6 ft 8 in) | 92 kg (203 lb) | 25 – 16 February 2000 |
| F | 28 | (Russia) | Goldin, Vladislav | 2.02 m (6 ft 8 in) | 90 kg (198 lb) | 23 – 12 May 2001 |
| SG | 29 | (Russia) | Tishin, Vsevolod | 1.93 m (6 ft 4 in) | 83 kg (183 lb) | 23 – 9 April 2001 |
| PG | 31 | (Russia) | Konovalov, Makar | 1.85 m (6 ft 1 in) | 66 kg (146 lb) | 24 – 6 December 2000 |
| F | 33 | (Russia) | Lakhin, Viktor | 2.03 m (6 ft 8 in) | 82 kg (181 lb) | 23 – 30 July 2001 |
| SG | 34 | (Russia) | Koroteyev, Serafim | 1.87 m (6 ft 2 in) | 72 kg (159 lb) | 24 – 14 August 2000 |
| SF | 35 | (Russia) | Posrednikov, Vasiliy | 1.99 m (6 ft 6 in) | 95 kg (209 lb) | 24 – 13 May 2000 |

Head coach

- (Russia) Maksim Sharafan

Assistant coach(es)

- (Russia) Anton Katayev

Athletic trainer(s)

- (Russia) Pavel Gerasimov

Physiotherapist(s)

- (Russia) Yuriy Lipskiy

Team manager

- (Russia) Sergey Mazurin

Legend

- (C) Team captain
- Injured

- Roster
Updated: 2018-08-11
