= First Regional Basketball League =

First Men's Regional League
- Founded: 2006; 20 years ago
- First season: 2006–07
- Country: Serbia
- Confederation: FIBA Europe
- Divisions: 4
- Number of teams: 60
- Level on pyramid: 3rd
- Promotion to: Second Men's League
- Relegation to: Second Men's Regional League
- Domestic cup: Cup of Serbia
- Website: kss.rs

First Men's Regional League (Serbian Cyrillic: Прва мушка регионална лига, romanized: Prva muška regionalna liga), previously First Serbian League, is the men's regional basketball league in Serbia. It is the 3rd-tier of the basketball league system in Serbia. Founded in 2006, it is run by the Basketball Federation of Serbia (KSS).

== Rules ==
=== Competition format ===
The league, operated by the Basketball Federation of Serbia and regional basketball associations, consists of four divisions, North, Central, East and West, which have 14 teams each. The first team in every division will be promoted to the Second Basketball League of Serbia. The teams positioned 13th and 14th in the First Regional League will be relegated to a lower-tier league - the Second Regional League.

=== Groups ===
Division	Teams	Regional Basketball Association
North	16	BA Vojvodina
Central	14	BA Belgrade
East	14	RBA East Serbia; RBA South Serbia
West	16	RBA West Serbia; RBA Central Serbia; RBA Raška–Kosovo

== History ==
Division champions of the First Regional League:

Season	North		South		Ref.
2006–07	Kotež Pfizer (Belgrade)		Sloboda (Užice)		
2007–08	Superfund BP (Belgrade)		Maraton (Jagodina)		
Season	North	Center	East	West	Ref.
2008–09	Železničar Inđija (Inđija)	Partizan B-team (Belgrade)	Jug (Vranje)	Jagodina (Jagodina)	
2009–10	Spartak (Subotica)	Radnički Belgrade (Belgrade)	Niš (Niš)	Student UK (Kragujevac)	
2010–11	Mladost Bački Jarak (Bački Jarak)	Mladost Zemun (Zemun)	Napredak MAXI CO (Aleksinac)	Šabac (Šabac)	
2011–12	Meridiana (Novi Sad)	Partizan NIS B-team (Belgrade)	Morava (Vladičin Han)	Plana (Velika Plana)	
2012–13	Vojvodina (Novi Sad)	Kolubara LA 2003 (Lazarevac)	Pirot (Pirot)	Šabac (Šabac)	
2013–14	Srem (Sremska Mitrovica)	Viva Basket (Belgrade)	Zdravlje (Leskovac)	Plana (Velika Plana)	
2014–15	Dunav (Stari Banovci)	Beko (Belgrade)	Niš (Niš)	Zlatibor (Čajetina)	
2015–16	Futog Tupanjac MD (Futog)	Kolubara LA 2003 (Lazarevac)	Rtanj (Boljevac)	Radnički 1950 (Kragujevac)	
2016–17	Akademik (Srbobran)	Žarkovo (Belgrade)	Zdravlje (Leskovac)	Klik (Arilje)	
2017–18	Vrbas (Vrbas)	Zemun Fitofarmacija (Belgrade)	Rtanj (Boljevac)	Zlatar (Nova Varoš)	
2018–19	Sveti Đorđe (Žitište)	Radnički Belgrade (Belgrade)	Fair Play (Niš)	Železničar Čačak (Čačak)	
2019–20	All canceled due to the COVID-19 pandemic in Serbia				
2020–21	Hercegovac (Gajdobra)	Žitko Basket (Belgrade)	Radnik (Surdulica)	Čačak 94 (Čačak)	
2021–22	Joker (Sombor)	Beko (Belgrade)	Morava (Vladičin Han)	Radnički 1950 (Kragujevac)	
2022–23	Proleter Zrenjanin (Zrenjanin)	Radnički Beograd (Belgrade)	Bor (Bor)	Loznica (Loznica)	
2023–24	Železničar Inđija (Inđija)	Zemun (Zemun)	Niš (Niš)	Ivanjica (Ivanjica)	
2024–25	Sloven (Ruma)	IBC (Belgrade)	OKK Konstantin (Niš)	KK Jagodina (Jagodina)	
2025–26	Dunav 2014 (Apatin)	Astra Beograd (Belgrade)	Borac Leskovac (Leskovac)	Napredak Kruševac (Kruševac)	

== Current clubs ==
The following is the list of clubs for the 2024–25 season.

=== North ===
The North division is composed of 16 clubs.

Team	City
Akademik	Srbobran
Breg	Breg
Dinamo Pančevo	Pančevo
Dunav 2014	Apatin
Futog	Futog
Hajduk Kula	Kula
Nova Pazova	Nova Pazova
Petrovgrad Zrenjanin	Zrenjanin
Radnički Kovin	Kovin
Sloven	Ruma
Srem	Sremska Mitrovica
Star	Novi Sad
Stara Pazova	Stara Pazova
Sveti Đorđe	Žitište
Topola	Bačka Topola
Vrbas	Vrbas

=== Center ===
The Center division is composed of 14 clubs.

Team	City
Astra Beograd	Belgrade
Barajevo	Belgrade
Beovuk 72	Belgrade
IBC	Belgrade
Mladenovac	Mladenovac
Mladost VEBA	Belgrade
Paragon Lazarevac	Lazarevac
Radnički Obrenovac	Obrenovac
Real Beograd	Belgrade
Rivers BM	Belgrade
Torlak	Belgrade
Vizura	Zemun
Žarkovo	Belgrade
Žitko Basket	Belgrade

=== East ===
The East division is composed of 14 teams.

Team	City
Bin	Zaječar
Bor RTB	Bor
Borac Leskovac	Leskovac
Dimitrovgrad	Dimitrovgrad
Jablanica	Medveđa
Jastrebac Aleksina	Aleksinac
Knjaževac 1950	Knjaževac
Konstantin	Niš
OKK Junior	Niš
Napredak Aleksinac	Aleksinac
Panteri	Vranje
Ratnici	Niš
Topličanin	Prokuplje
Trijumf	Niš

=== West ===
The West division is composed of 16 teams.

Team	City
Ćuprija	Ćuprija
Jagodina	Jagodina
Mladost Čačak	Čačak
Napredak Junior	Kruševac
Novi Pazar 1969	Novi Pazar
Paraćin	Paraćin
Plana	Velika Plana
Polet Ratina	Ratina
Požarevac	Požarevac
Priboj	Priboj
Šabac	Šabac
Smederevo 1953	Smederevo
Svilajnac	Svilajnac
Užice	Užice
Zekas 75	Rača
Zlatar	Nova Varoš
