= VTB United Youth League =

- Founded: 2013; 12 years ago
- First season: 2013–14
- Country: Russia
- Confederation: FIBA Europe
- Number of teams: 11
- Domestic cup(s): Russian Cup
- Current champions: (Russia) Zenit M (1st title)
- Most championships: (Russia) CSKA Junior (5 titles)
- Website: www.vtbyouth-league.com

The VTB United Youth League (Russian: Единая Молодежная Лига ВТБ) is a basketball tournament that is contested between the youth teams of basketball clubs from the VTB United League. The league is sponsored by VTB Bank.

The reigning champion is Zenit M after defeating 68:71 after overtime CSKA Junior.

== Formats ==
In the tournament, there are 11 teams that play in 4 rounds - paired matches at home and on the road. The 8 best teams on the basis of the regular season go to the Final Eight. The age of players performing in the Youth League must not be less than 15 and not older than 19 years on the date of the first match.

== Current clubs ==
Club	City
Avtodor-2	Saratov
CSKA Junior	Moscow
Enisey-2	Krasnoyarsk
Khimki-2	Khimki
Lokomotiv-Kuban-2	Krasnodar
Nizhniy Novgorod-2	Nizhniy Novgorod
Parma-2	Perm
Samara-2	Samara
Spartak Saint Petersburg-2	Saint Petersburg
UNICS-2	Kazan
Zenit-M	Saint-Petersburg
MBA-2	Moscow

== Finals ==
Season	Host city	Final			Third place game		
Season	Host city	Champion	Score	Runner-up	Bronze	Score	4th place
2013–14	No playoffs	Khimki-2	By location	Zenit-2	UNICS-2	By location	CSKA-2
2014–15	Saratov	CSKA-2	97:76	UNICS-2	Khimki-2	91:66	Avtodor-2
2015–16	Samara	CSKA-2	67:65	Avtodor-2	Khimki-2	69:66	Samara-2
2016–17	Krasnodar	CSKA-2	70:61	Khimki-2	Samara-2	78:74	Lokomotiv-Kuban-2
2017–18	Samara	CSKA Junior	78:74	Samara-2	Khimki-2	91:88	Lokomotiv-Kuban-2
2018–19	Saint Petersburg	Khimki-2	82:70	CSKA Junior	Samara-2	91:65	Avtodor-2
2020-21	Saint Petersburg	CSKA Junior	89:65	Lokomotiv-Kuban-2	Nizhny Novgorod-2	63:61	Khimki-2
2021-22	Moscow	Zenit M	71:68	CSKA Junior	Khimki-2	57:55	MBA-2

== Statistics by club ==
Club	Gold	Silver	Bronze
CSKA Junior	5 (2015, 2016, 2017, 2018, 2021)	2 (2019, 2022)	
Khimki-2	2 (2014, 2019)	1 (2017)	3 (2015, 2016, 2018)
Zenit M	1 (2022)		
Samara-2		1 (2018)	2 (2017, 2019)
UNICS-2		1 (2015)	1 (2014)
Zenit-2		1 (2014)	
Avtodor-2		1 (2016)	

== See also ==
- Euroleague Basketball Next Generation Tournament
- Junior ABA League
