= Boriša Simanić =

Serbian basketball player

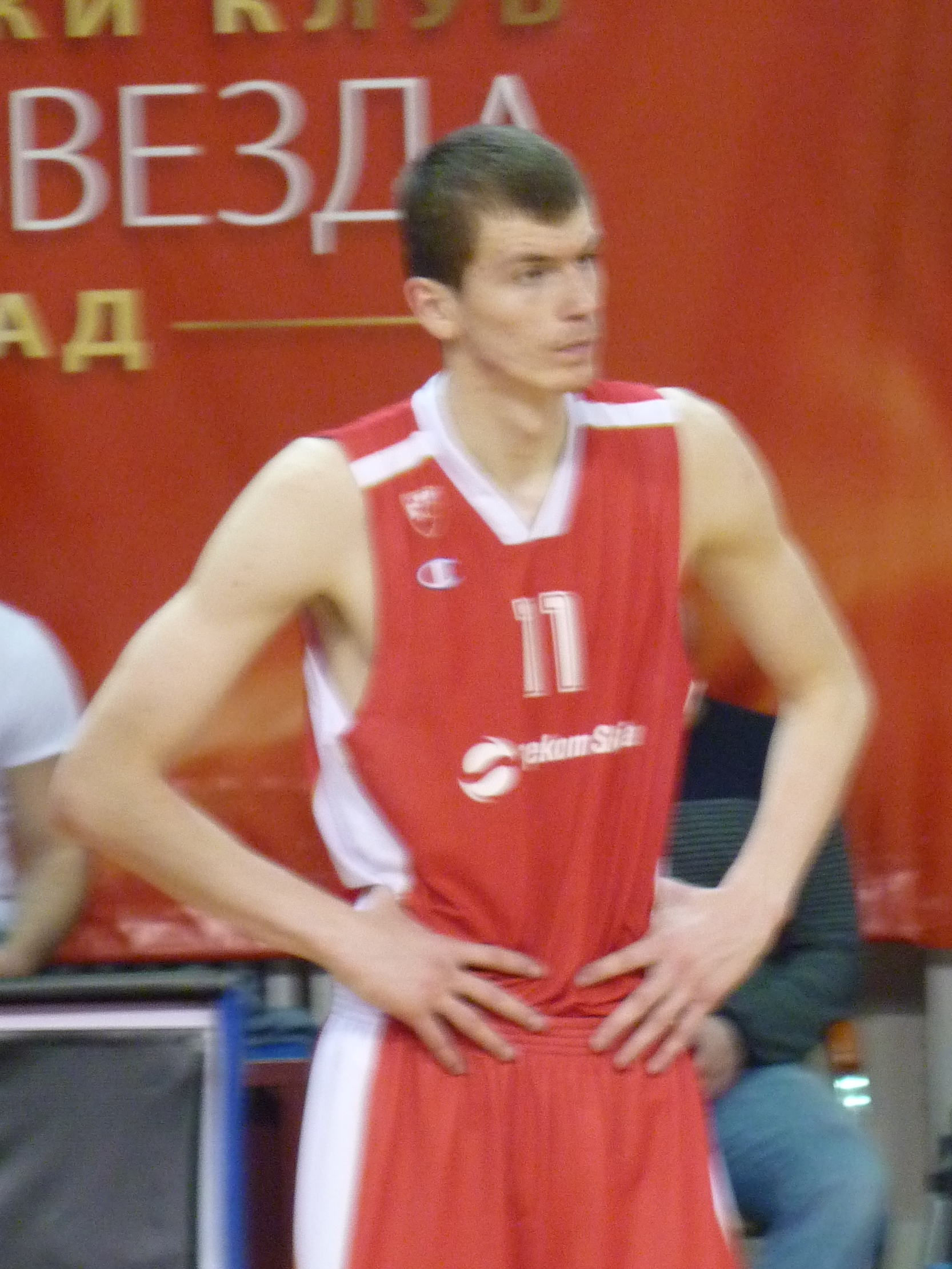
- Simanić with Crvena zvezda U18 in 2015

No. 22 – Mitteldeutscher BC
- Position: Power forward
- League: Basketball Bundesliga

Personal information
- Born: 20 March 1998 (age 28) Ljubovija, Serbia, FR Yugoslavia
- Listed height: 2.11 m (6 ft 11 in)
- Listed weight: 100 kg (220 lb)

Career information
- NBA draft: 2020: undrafted
- Playing career: 2014–present

Career history
- 2014–2021: Crvena zvezda
- 2014–2015: → FMP
- 2017–2018: → FMP
- 2021–2022: Mega
- 2022–2023: Zaragoza
- 2024–2026: Igokea
- 2026–present: Mitteldeutscher

Career highlights
- 3× ABA League champion (2016, 2017, 2019); 3× Serbian League champion (2016, 2017, 2019); Bosnian League champion (2025); 2× Serbian Cup winner (2017, 2021); Bosnian Cup winner (2025); Adriatic Supercup winner (2018); Next Generation Tournament MVP (2016)
Medals
Men's basketball
Representing Serbia
FIBA World Cup
Silver medal – second place	2023 Philippines–Japan–Indonesia
U16 European Championship
Silver medal – second place	2013 Ukraine	Team

Boriša Simanić (Serbian Cyrillic: Бориша Симанић, born 20 March 1998) is a Serbian professional basketball player for Mitteldeutscher Basketball Club (MBC) of the German Basketball Bundesliga (BBL). Standing at 2.11 m, he plays at the power forward position. He also represents the Serbian national team in international competitions.

== Playing career ==
=== Crvena zvezda (2013–2021) ===
Boriša moved to the Crvena zvezda's youth system in December 2013 from Budućnost Bijeljina, making his senior team debut at Crvena zvezda during the 2015–16 season. He was named Most Valuable Player of the 2016 Euroleague Next Generation Tournament Finals in 2016.

Simanić made his first EuroLeague appearance on 22 October 2015 in a 71–98 loss to Real Madrid, tallying ten points and four rebounds in 28 minutes of action. He was a member of the World Select Team that played in the Nike Hoop Summit in Portland, Oregon on 7 April 2017. Coming off the bench, Simanić recorded two points, two rebounds and two blocked shots in 10:17 minutes of play.

In August 2017, Simanić was once again loaned to FMP. On 26 June 2019, Simanić signed a two-year extension for Crvena zvezda. In March 2021, the Zvezda parted ways with him.

=== Mega Basket (2021–2022) ===
In April 2021, Simanić signed for Mega Basket.

In July 2022, Simanić played for the Utah Jazz during the 2022 NBA Summer League.

=== Zaragoza (2022–2023) ===
On 20 July 2022, Simanić signed with Spanish club Casademont Zaragoza.

On 19 September 2023, he announced his retirement of playing basketball.

=== Igokea (2024–2026) ===
In September 2024, Simanić signed with the Bosnian Igokea returning to professional basketball after a year after his kidney injury. In June 2025, Simanić was signed to a one-year contract extension with the team.

=== Mitteldeutscher BC (2026–present) ===
On August 13, 2026, he signed with Mitteldeutscher BC of the Basketball Bundesliga (BBL).

== National team career ==
Simanić competed for the Serbian junior national teams at the 2013 under-16 European Championships, winning a silver medal at the event. One year later, he averaged 10.2 points, 4.3 boards and 1.3 blocked shots a contest throughout the tournament in Latvia.

In 2015, Simanić represented the Serbian under-18 squad at the European Championships and the under-19 team at the World Championships.

On 30 August 2023, while playing against South Sudan in 2023 FIBA Basketball World Cup, Simanić was struck in the kidney by Nuni Omot while defending the basket. This blow resulted in a major injury which required his kidney to be removed.

== Career statistics ==
Legend
GP	Games played	GS	Games started	MPG	Minutes per game
FG%	Field-goal percentage	3P%	3-point field-goal percentage	FT%	Free-throw percentage
RPG	Rebounds per game	APG	Assists per game	SPG	Steals per game
BPG	Blocks per game	PPG	Points per game	PIR	Performance index rating
**Bold**	Career high

=== Euroleague ===
Year	Team	GP	GS	MPG	FG%	3P%	FT%	RPG	APG	SPG	BPG	PPG	PIR
2015–16	Crvena zvezda	7	0	7.5	.500	.286	**1.000**	1.0	0.0	0.1	0.3	2.0	2.3
2016–17	Crvena zvezda	3	**2**	5.6	.200	.000	.000	1.0	.3	0.0	0.0	0.7	1.0
2019–20	Crvena zvezda	**20**	**18**	**12.4**	**.625**	**.516**	.500	**1.2**	**0.6**	**0.3**	**0.5**	**4.0**	**3.2**
2020–21	Crvena zvezda	3	0	4.2	.000	.500	.000	1.0	0.3	**0.3**	0.0	1.0	1.3
Career		10	2	7.0	.400	.222	1.000	1.0	.1	.1	.2	1.6	1.3

== See also ==
- List of KK Crvena zvezda players with 100 games played
