= KK Knjaževac 1950 =

Basketball club in Knjaževac, Serbia

Košarkaški klub Knjaževac 1950
- Leagues: First Regional League of Serbia
- Founded: 1950; 75 years ago
- History: KK Knjaževac 1950 (1950–present)
- Arena: Kaplar Hall
- Capacity: 250
- Location: Knjaževac, Serbia
- Team colors: Red and White
- Head coach: Goran Miljkovic

Košarkaški klub Knjaževac 1950 (Serbian Cyrillic: Кошаркашки клуб Књажевац 1950), commonly referred to as Knjaževac, is a men's basketball club based in Knjaževac, Serbia. They are currently competing in the First Regional League of Serbia, East Division.

The club was founded in 1950 and was named after its host city.

== History ==
=== 2011–2016 ===
After 5 good seasons in the First Regional League the club stopped competing following the 2015–16 season. In the final season Knjaževac 1950 did not qualify to the Second Basketball league of Serbia for 2016–17 season. They have had an 82–79 road win over won Rtanj in the 1st game but then had an 84–75 home loss which was insufficient for advance to the Second Basketball league of Serbia in the 2016–17 season due to points difference.

=== After 2020 ===
In the 2020–21 season, Knjaževac return in Serbia basketball. They started in Second Regional League, they were 2nd but they did qualify to First Regional League again for the 2021–22 season.

In the 2021–22 season, Knjaževac was 3rd place in First Regional League group A with record 7–5. In First Regional League playoff they finished 7th out of 8 teams with record 3–11.

Tebi je zivot dao sve, a meni Kevin Punter je.
