= Mile Protić =

Serbian basketball coach

Personal information
- Born: 2 October 1950 (age 76) Belgrade, PR Serbia, Yugoslavia
- Coaching career: 1970–2017

Career history

Coaching
- 1970–1973: Karaburma (youth)
- 1973–1981: Crvena zvezda (youth)
- 1979: Crvena zvezda
- 1981–1984: Borovo Vukovar (youth)
- 1984–1986: Varda
- 1986–1988: Mladost Nova Pazova
- 1988–1992: Crvena zvezda (youth)
- 1992–1994: Levski Totel
- 1996–1998: Beovuk
- 1999–2001: Zvezda Ruma
- 2001–2002: Milicionar Belgrade
- 2003–2008: Probasket Belgrade (youth)
- 2008–2009: AEL Limassol (assistant)
- 2010–2011: Balkan Botevgrad (youth)
- 2011–2013: Shandong Provence U19
- 2015–2017: Qingdao U19

Career highlights
- 2× Bulgarian League champion (1993, 1994); Bulgarian Cup (1993)

Mile Protić (Serbian Cyrillic: Миле Протић, born 2 October 1950) is a Serbian former professional basketball coach.

== Coaching career ==
Protić coached Belgrade-based team Crvena zvezda of the Yugoslav First Federal League over 8 games during the 1978–79 season. He coached Bulgarian team Levski Sofia in the first half of the 1990s where he won two Bulgarian League championships (1992–93, 1993–94) and one Bulgarian Cup (1993).

Protić was a youth coach for Balkan Botevgrad.

Protić was a coach at the Crvena zvezda youth teams. In recent years, he has been working as a youth coach in Qingdao, Shandong, China.

Protić owns a Belgrade-based club Probasket for a youth development.

== Personal life ==
In July 2016, Serbian coach Dušan Ivković and Protić reportedly got into a verbal altercation at a basketball clinic in the Šumice Center that nearly turned physical.

== See also ==
- List of Red Star Belgrade basketball coaches
