= Milan Dozet =

Serbian basketball executive and former player

Crvena zvezda Meridianbet
- Title: Vice President
- League: Basketball League of Serbia; Adriatic League

Personal information
- Born: 12 May 1979 (age 47) Gospić, SR Croatia, SFR Yugoslavia
- Listed height: 2.03 m (6 ft 8 in)
- Listed weight: 88 kg (194 lb)

Career information
- NBA draft: 2001: undrafted
- Playing career: 1996–2014
- Position: Small forward
- Number: 6

Career history
- 1996–1998: Partizan
- 1998–1999: Zemun
- 1999–2001: Sloga
- 2001–2004: Crvena Zvezda
- 2004–2006: NIS Vojvodina
- 2006–2007: Kyiv
- 2007–2008: Panellinios
- 2008–2009: Proteas AEL
- 2009–2010: APOEL
- 2010–2014: Igokea

Career highlights
- No. 6 retired by Igokea

Milan Dozet (Serbian Cyrillic: Милан Дозет; born 12 May 1979) is a Serbian professional basketball executive and former player. He currently serves as the Vice President for Crvena zvezda. Standing at 2.03 m (6 ft 8 in), he played the small forward position.

== Professional career ==
During his professional career, Dozet played with the following clubs: Partizan, Zemun, Sloga, Crvena Zvezda, NIS Vojvodina, Kyiv, Panellinios, Proteas AEL, APOEL and Igokea.

In February 2016, his former club Igokea retired his jersey number.

== National team career ==
Dozet was a member of the FR Yugoslavia under-20 team that won the gold medal at the 1998 FIBA Europe Under-20 Championship in Italy. He also won the bronze medal at the 2005 Summer Universiade in İzmir, Turkey.

== Career achievements ==
- Bosnian League champion: 2 (with Igokea: 2012–13, 2013–14)
- Cypriot League champion: 1 (with APOEL: 2009–10)
- YUBA League champion: 1 (with Partizan: 1996–97)
- Serbia-Montenegro Cup winner: 1 (with Crvena zvezda: 2003–04)
- Ukrainian Cup winner: 1 (with Kyiv: 2006–07)
- Cypriot Cup winner: 1 (with AEL: 2008–09)
- Bosnian Cup winner: 1 (with Igokea: 2012–13)

== Post-playing career ==
On 3 August 2020, Dozet was elected as a member of the Assembly of the KK Crvena zvezda. On 1 January 2022, Crvena zvezda appointed Dozet as their new sporting director. In June 2026, he transitioned to the role of Vice President.

== See also ==
- List of KK Crvena zvezda players with 100 games played

Sporting positions
Preceded by Nemanja Vasiljević	Sporting director of KK Crvena zvezda 2022–2026	Succeeded by Miloš Teodosić
