= KK Radnički 1950 =

Basketball club in Kragujevac, Serbia

Radnički 1950
- Nickname: Crveni (The Reds)
- Leagues: Second League of Serbia
- Founded: 2007; 18 years ago
- History: KK Mladost Palanka (2007–2014); KK Radnički 1950 (2014–present)
- Arena: Jezero Hall
- Capacity: 3,750
- Location: Serbia; Smederevska Palanka (2007–2014); Kragujevac (2014–present)
- Team colors: Red and White
- Website: kkradnicki1950.rs

Košarkaški klub Radnički 1950 (Serbian Cyrillic: Кошаркашки клуб Раднички 1950), commonly referred to as KK Radnički 1950, is a men's professional basketball club based in Kragujevac, Serbia. The club was founded in Smederevska Palanka in 2007 as KK Mladost Palanka, and was relocated to Kragujevac in 2014. The club currently plays in the Second Basketball League of Serbia.

== History ==
=== Radnički 1950 ===
The club has changed its name on 6 October 2014, following the disestablishment of Radnički Kragujevac in summer 2014.

In its second season in the First Regional League, West Division Radnički 1950 won the League and got promoted to the Second League of Serbia for the 2016–17 season.

In August 2018, Zoran Stevanović became the club's president.

Following departure from Partizan, Nikola Lončar joined the club's staff.

== Players ==
- Luka Igrutinović

== Coaches ==
- (Serbia) Igor Todorović (2014–2018)
- (Serbia) Ivica Vukotić (2018–2020)
- (Serbia) Zoran Cvetanović (2020–2021)
- (Serbia) Igor Todorović (2021–2022)
- (Serbia) Nenad Nikolić (2022–present)

== Season by season ==
Season	Tier	Division	Pos.	Postseason	W–L	National Cup
2014–15	3	First Regional (West)	8	—	11–15	DNQ
2015–16	3	First Regional (West)	1	—	23–3	DNQ
2016–17	2	Second League	6	—	19–9	DNQ
2017–18	3	First Regional (West)	3	—	19–7	DNQ
2018–19	3	First Regional (West)	A3	Playoff 6th	14–14	DNQ
2019–20	3	First Regional (West)	Abandoned		8–12	DNQ
2020–21	3	First Regional (West)	A6	Playout 2nd	15–13	DNQ
2021–22	3	First Regional (West)	A1	Playoff W	25–3	DNQ

Source: SrbijaSport

== Trophies and awards ==
=== Trophies ===
- First Regional League, West Division (3rd-tier)
  - Winners (2): 2015–16, 2021–22
