= Ivica Vukotić =

Serbian basketball player and coach

Personal information
- Born: 6 January 1977 (age 49) Kragujevac, SR Serbia, Yugoslavia
- Listed height: 1.83 m (6 ft 0 in)

Career information
- NBA draft: 1999: undrafted
- Playing career: 1994–2014
- Position: Point guard
- Number: 4, 5
- Coaching career: 2018–present

Career history

Playing
- 1994–1995: Radnički Kragujevac
- –1998: Zastava
- 1998–1999: Mogren
- 1999–2000: Zastava
- 2000–2001: Kumanovo
- 2001–2002: TuS Jena
- 2005–2006: Igokea
- 2006–2007: Jedinstvo Bijelo Polje
- 2007–2008: Dunav 2007 Ruse
- AMAK SP Ohrid
- 2010–2011: Kumanovo
- 2012–2013: Plana
- 2013–2014: Stragari

Coaching
- 2018–2020: Radnički 1950
- 2020–2021: Radnički Kragujevac (assistant)
- 2021–2022: Radnički Kragujevac
- 2022-2023: OKK Novi Pazar

Ivica Vukotić (Serbian Cyrillic: Ивица Вукотић; born 6 January 1977) is a Serbian professional basketball coach and former player. He has a wife Biljana and daughter Tara.

== Professional career ==
A point guard, Vukotić played for Zastava, Mogren Budva, Kumanovo, TuS Jena, Igokea, Jedinstvo Bijelo Polje, Dunav 2007 Ruse,AMAK SP Ohrid, Spars Sarajevo, Plana, and Stragari. He retired as a player with Stragari in 2014.

== Coaching career ==
In August 2018, Vukotić was named the head coach of Radnički 1950 Kragujevac. He left in August 2020.

On 23 January 2021, Radnički Kragujevac hired Vukotić as their new head coach. He resign in February 2022.
