= KK Beko =

Basketball club in Belgrade, Serbia

Beko
- Leagues: Second League of Serbia
- Founded: 1986; 40 years ago
- History: KK Kotež (1986–2012); KK Beko (2012–present)
- Arena: Padinska Skela Hall
- Capacity: 600
- Location: Belgrade, Serbia
- Team colors: Blue and White
- Website: kkbeko.rs

Košarkaški klub Beko (Serbian Cyrillic: Кошаркашки клуб Беко), commonly referred to as KK Beko, is a men's professional basketball club based in Belgrade, Serbia. They currently compete in the Second Basketball League of Serbia (2nd-tier).

== History ==
The club was founded in 1986 as KK Kotež and was named after Kotež, an urban neighborhood of Palilula, Belgrade.

== Sponsorship naming ==
The club has had several denominations through the years due to its sponsorship:

- Kotež Pfizer: 2006–2007
- Kotež BEKO: 2011–2012

== Players ==
- Miloš Ćojbašić

== Coaches ==
- (Serbia and Montenegro) Velisav Vesković (2008)
- (Montenegro) Vasilije Budimić (2017–2021)
- (Serbia) Nenad Petronić (2021–present)

== Trophies and awards ==
=== Trophies ===
- First Regional League of Serbia, Central Division (3rd-tier)
  - Winners (3): 2006–07, 2014–15, 2021–22

== Notable players ==
- (Serbia) Alen Smailagić

Youth system

- (Socialist Federal Republic of Yugoslavia) Dejan Koturović
- (Serbia and Montenegro) Mladen Pantić
- (Serbia and Montenegro) Nenad Šulović
