= Milan Majstorović =

Serbian basketball player

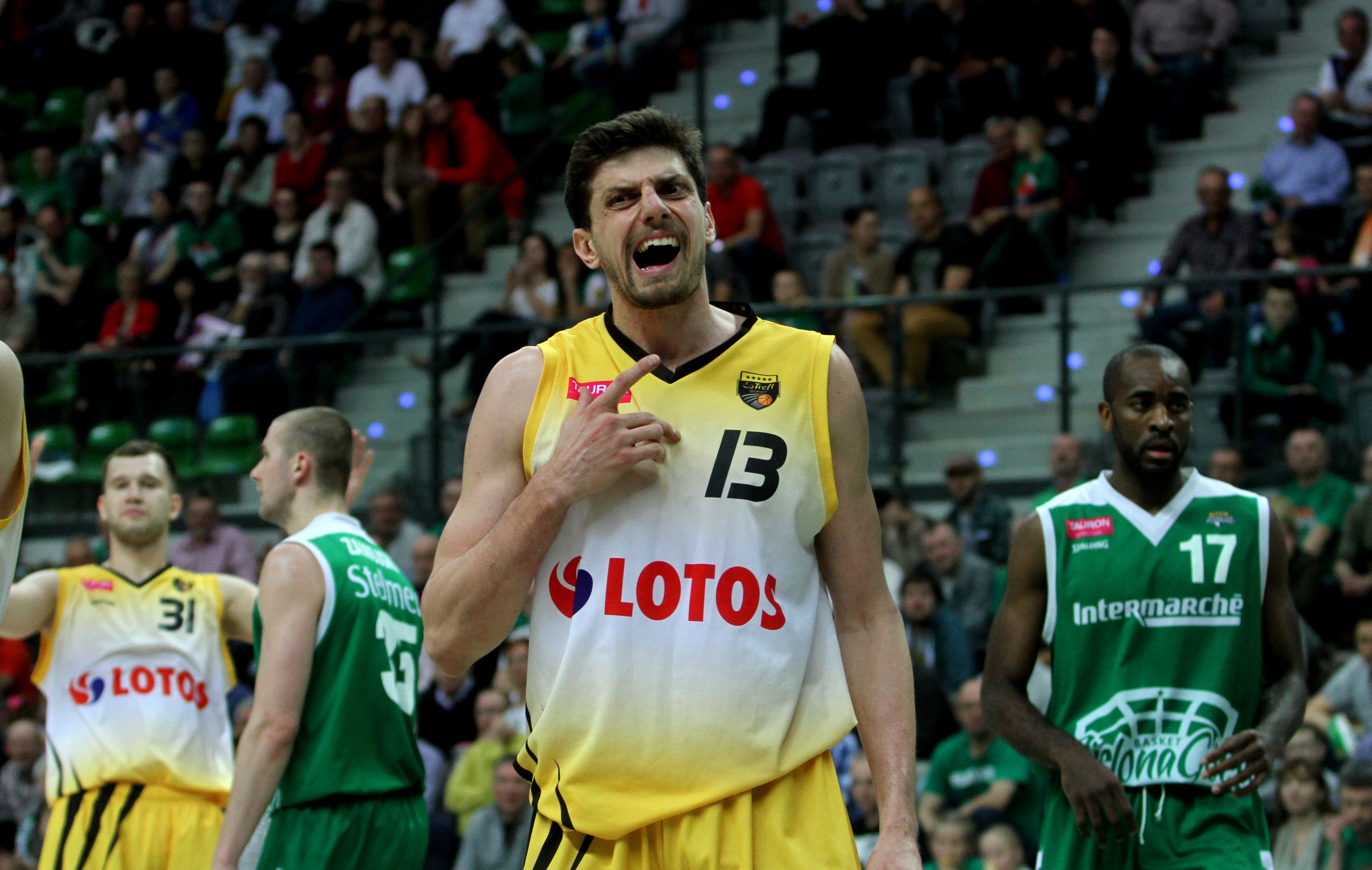
- Majstorović playing for Trefl Sopot in 2014

Crvena zvezda mts
- Title: U19 Assistant Coach

Personal information
- Born: 28 January 1983 (age 43) Novi Sad, SR Serbia, SFR Yugoslavia
- Listed height: 2.07 m (6 ft 9 in)
- Listed weight: 110 kg (243 lb)

Career information
- NBA draft: 2005: undrafted
- Playing career: 2001–2018
- Position: Power forward / center
- Number: 11, 12
- Coaching career: 2021–present

Career history

Playing
- 2001–2003: Spartak Subotica
- 2003–2005: Reflex
- 2005–2007: Lagun Aro Bilbao Basket
- 2007–2010: EWE Oldenburg
- 2010–2011: Assignia Manresa
- 2011–2012: EWE Oldenburg
- 2013–2014: Trefl Sopot
- 2014–2015: Falco KC Szombathely
- 2016: OKK Beograd
- 2017–2018: Radnički Beograd

Coaching
- 2021–present: Crvena zvezda U19 (assistant)

Career highlights
- Bundesliga champion (2009); Adriatic League champion (2004)
Medals
Men's basketball
Representing Serbia and Montenegro
Summer Universiade
Gold medal – first place	2003 Daegu

Milan Majstorović (Serbian Cyrillic: Милан Мајсторовић; born 28 January 1983) is a Serbian professional basketball coach and former player who is an assistant coach for Crvena zvezda U19. Standing at 6 ft 9 in (2.06 m) and weighing 243 pounds (110 kg), he played both power forward and center positions.

== Coaching career ==
In 2021, Crvena zvezda hired Majstorović as their new assistant coach for the under-19 team. He was also appointed to the 2022–23 coaching staff.
