= Je'Kel Foster =

American basketball player (born 1983)

Personal information
- Born: July 22, 1983 (age 43) Natchez, Mississippi, U.S.
- Listed height: 6 ft 3 in (1.91 m)
- Listed weight: 216 lb (98 kg)

Career information
- High school: Natchez (Natchez, Mississippi)
- College: Howard College (2002–2003); Chipola (2003–2004); Ohio State (2004–2006)
- NBA draft: 2006: undrafted
- Playing career: 2006–present
- Position: Point guard / shooting guard

Career history
- 2006–2007: EnBW Ludwigsburg
- 2007–2008: Paris-Levallois
- 2008–2010: EWE Baskets Oldenburg
- 2010–2011: Triboldi Cremona
- 2011–2012: Bayern Munich
- 2012: Spirou Charleroi
- 2012–2013: Alba Berlin
- 2013: JSF Nanterre
- 2014: Sidigas Avellino
- 2015: Medi Bayreuth
- 2015–2016: Guaros de Lara
- 2016: Manresa
- 2016–2018: Benfica Libolo

Career highlights
- German Bundesliga champion (2009); 2× German Bundesliga All-Star (2007, 2012); German League Newcomer of the Year (2007)

Je'Kel Reshard Foster (born July 22, 1983) is an American professional basketball player for Benfica do Libolo of the BIC Basket.

== College ==
Foster began his studies at Howard Junior College in Big Spring, Texas. After a year, his basketball coach Chris Jans joined the Chipola Junior College at Marianna, Florida and took Foster with him. For further studies Foster then switched to the Ohio State University, where he played for the university team Buckeyes in the NCAA.

== Professional career ==
After going undrafted in the 2006 NBA draft, he signed with EnBW Ludwigsburg of the German Bundesliga for the 2006–07 season.

For the 2007–08 season he signed with Paris-Levallois of the French LNB Pro A. From 2008 to 2010 he played with EWE Baskets Oldenburg. In July 2010, he signed with Triboldi Cremona of Italy for the 2010–11 season.

In July 2011, he signed with Bayern Munich. He played there till August 2012, when he was cut because of disciplinary reasons.

In September 2012, he signed with Spirou Charleroi of Belgium. He played there till December when he goes to Alba Berlin where he was signed a week after Alba lost point guard, Vule Avdalović, to a season-ending knee injury.

In October 2013, he signed with JSF Nanterre. He left them in December 2013. On February 5, 2014, he signed with Sidigas Avellino of Italy for the rest of the season.

On November 21, 2014, Foster signed with Homenetmen Beirut of Lebanon. However, he never played for the Lebanese club. On January 13, 2015, he signed with Medi Bayreuth of Germany for the rest of the season.

On December 9, 2015, he signed with Guaros de Lara of the Venezuelan LPB. On March 1, 2016, he signed with ICL Manresa of Spain for the rest of the 2015–16 ACB season.

On September 8, 2016, Foster signed in Angola with C.R.D. Libolo of the BIC Basket.
