= Vojislav Stojanović =

Serbian professional basketball player (born 1997)

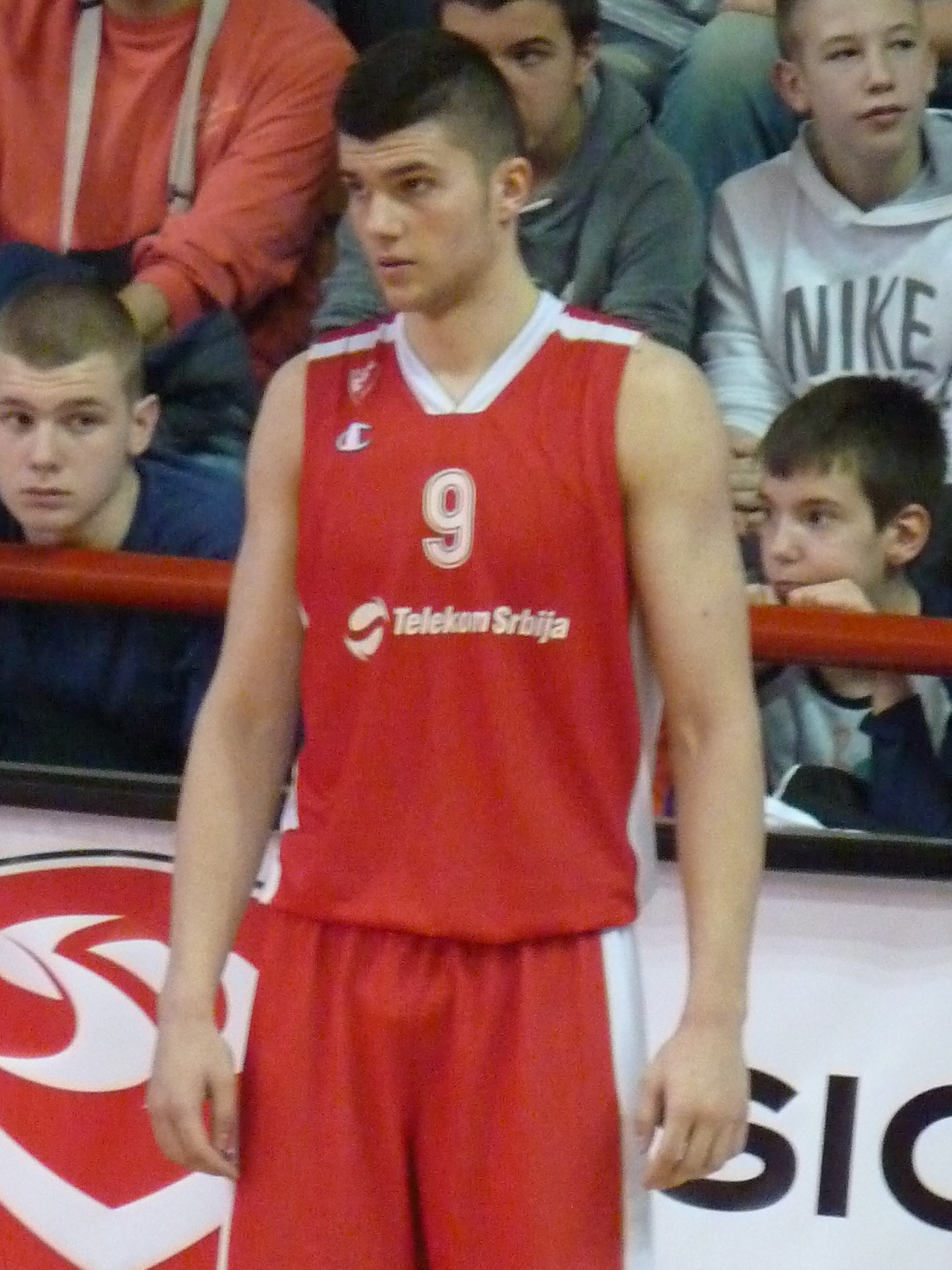
- Stojanović with Crvena zvezda U19 in March 2015.

Personal information
- Born: April 14, 1997 (age 29) Belgrade, FR Yugoslavia
- Listed height: 1.99 m (6 ft 6 in)
- Listed weight: 98 kg (216 lb)

Career information
- NBA draft: 2019: undrafted
- Playing career: 2014–present
- Position: Shooting guard / small forward

Career history
- 2014–2015: Crvena zvezda
- 2014–2015: → FMP
- 2015–2018: Orlandina
- 2018–2020: Vanoli Cremona
- 2021: Fortitudo Bologna
- 2021–2022: Stings Mantova

Career highlights
- Euroleague IJT MVP (2014)
Medals
Men's basketball
Representing Serbia
U16 European Championship
Silver medal – second place	2013 Ukraine	U16 National Team
U17 World Championship
Bronze medal – third place	2014 UAE	U17 National Team

Vojislav Stojanović (Serbian Cyrillic: Војислав Стојановић; born April 14, 1997) is a Serbian professional basketball player.

== Professional career ==
Vojislav grew up with Crvena zvezda youth teams. He was the most valuable player of the 2014 Euroleague NIJT Final 8, contributing to winning the trophy with the averages of 13.5 points, 6.3 rebounds and 4.8 assists over four games.

On August 2, 2018, Stojanović signed a three-year deal with the Italian club Auxilium Torino. However, on November 24, 2018, he parted ways with Torino. Stojanović never played a single minute with the team. Coach Larry Brown never saw him as a part of the rotations and put him outside of the active roster. Two days later, he signed a three-year deal with Vanoli Cremona.

After being free agent for almost all the 2020–21, he was signed by Fortitudo Bologna one match before the end of the season.

On July 9, 2021, Stojanović signed for Stings Mantova in the Serie A2, second tier Italian national competition.
