= Euroleague Basketball Next Generation Tournament =

European U-18 men's basketball tournament

Next Generation Tournament
- Current season, competition or edition: 2025–26 EuroLeague Basketball Next Generation Tournament
- Sport: Basketball
- Founded: 2002
- CEO: Jesús 'Chus' Bueno
- President: Dejan Bodiroga
- No. of teams: 32
- Continent: Europe
- Most recent champion: (Spain) FC Barcelona (2nd title)
- Most titles: (Spain) Real Madrid (5 titles)
- Website: euroleaguebasketball.net/nge/

The Euroleague Basketball Next Generation Tournament is an international boy's youth age basketball tournament that is contested between the best basketball clubs in Europe in the Under-18 age category. The tournament is organized by Euroleague Basketball, and is sponsored by Adidas. The tournament's Final Four takes place during the senior men's EuroLeague Final Four event. The tournaments's Final Four also features a slam dunk contest and 3 point shootout contest.

== History ==
The first Next Generation Tournament Final Four was held in 2003, in Barcelona, Spain. The tournament was originally officially called the Euroleague Basketball International Junior Tournament and was sponsored by Nike. Its sponsorship name was originally the Nike International Junior Tournament (NIJT). Originally, the tournament featured only 8 teams in total. In 2014, the name of the tournament was officially changed to the Euroleague Basketball Next Generation Tournament, and Adidas took over as the tournament's main sponsor. Thus, the tournament's new sponsorship name became the Adidas Next Generation Tournament.

The four regional tournaments were originally the Torneo Città di Roma, the Torneig de Bàsquet Junior Ciutat de L'Hospitalet, the Kaunas International Junior Tournament, and the Belgrade International Junior Tournament. In 2016, the Torneo Città di Roma was replaced by the Torneo Costa del Sol.

== Format ==
In total, 34 teams compete to play for the Next Generation Tournament title, at the Next Generation Tournament Final Four. 32 teams compete in 4 regional tournaments, in order to qualify to the 8 team Final Four qualification tournament. The regional tournaments are the Torneig de Bàsquet Junior Ciutat de L'Hospitalet, the Kaunas International Junior Tournament, the Belgrade International Junior Tournament, and the Torneo Costa del Sol. The winners of each of the 4 regional tournaments qualify to the Final Four qualification tournament.

In addition to the 4 winners of each of the regional qualification tournaments, the reigning champion from the previous season, as well as three wild card invitees, also take part in the Final Tournament, which is played by eight teams that are divided into two groups of four teams each. The two group winners play on the same court where the senior men's EuroLeague Final Four is held.

== Results ==
Semifinalists or best 2nd in final group stage.

#	Season	Host city	Champion	Runner-up	Score	Semifinalists	MVP	Ref
1	2002–03	Barcelona	(Lithuania) Žalgiris	(Israel) Maccabi Tel Aviv	87–80		(Lithuania) Rolandas Alijevas	
2	2003–04	Tel Aviv	(Russia) CSKA Moscow	(Italy) Montepaschi Siena	90–62		(Russia) Vasiliy Zavoruev	
3	2004–05	Moscow	(Russia) CSKA Moscow	(Lithuania) Žalgiris	97–64		(Russia) Vasiliy Zavoruev	
4	2005–06	Prague	(Russia) CSKA Moscow	(Lithuania) Žalgiris	59–55		(Russia) Ivan Nelyubov	
5	2006–07	Athens	(Lithuania) Žalgiris	(Serbia) FMP	78–74		(Lithuania) Donatas Motiejūnas	
6	2007–08	Madrid	(Serbia) FMP	(Spain) Barcelona	80–70		(Serbia) Dejan Musli	
7	2008–09	Berlin	(Serbia) FMP	(Lithuania) Lietuvos rytas	123–110		(Serbia) Dejan Musli	
8	2009–10	Paris	(France) INSEP	(Serbia) FMP	83–73		(France) Livio Jean-Charles	
9	2010–11	Barcelona	(Croatia) Zagreb	(Lithuania) Žalgiris	76–65		(Croatia) Dario Šarić	
10	2011–12	Istanbul	(Lithuania) Lietuvos rytas	(Turkey) Fenerbahçe	88–70		(Turkey) Metecan Birsen	
11	2012–13	London	(Spain) FIATC Joventut	(Spain) Barcelona	82–59		(Spain) Alberto Abalde	
12	2013–14	Milan	(Serbia) Crvena zvezda Telekom	(Spain) Real Madrid	55–42		(Serbia) Vojislav Stojanović	
13	2014–15	Madrid	(Spain) Real Madrid	(Serbia) Crvena zvezda Telekom	73–70	Germany 3 / Serbia 4	(Slovenia) Luka Dončić	
14	2015–16	Berlin	(Spain) Barcelona Lassa	(Serbia) Crvena zvezda Telekom	90–82	Serbia 3 / Croatia 4	(Serbia) Boriša Simanić	
15	2016–17	Istanbul	(France) Centre Fédéral	(Serbia) Mega Bemax	65–58	Spain / Russia	(France) Ivan Février	
16	2017–18	Belgrade	(Lithuania) Lietuvos rytas	(Italy) Stella Azzurra	76–71	Spain / Spain	(Lithuania) Deividas Sirvydis	
17	2018–19	Vitoria-Gasteiz	(Spain) Real Madrid	(Serbia) Mega Bemax	95–76	Serbia / Germany	(Serbia) Mario Nakić	
-	2019–20	Cancelled due to the COVID-19 pandemic in Europe						
18	2020–21	Valencia	(Spain) Real Madrid	(Spain) Barcelona	81–78	Serbia / France	(Spain) Eli Ndiaye	
19	2021–22	Belgrade	(Serbia) Mega Mozzart	(European Union) Next Generation Select Team	82–61		(Serbia) Nikola Đurišić	
20	2022–23	Kaunas	(Spain) Real Madrid	(European Union) Next Generation Select Team	71–60		(Slovenia) Jan Vide	
21	2023–24	Berlin	(Spain) Real Madrid	(France) INSEP	85–84		(Spain) Hugo González	
22	2024–25	Abu Dhabi	(Lithuania) Žalgiris	(Italy) EA7 Emporio Armani Milan	89–81		(Lithuania) Dominykas Grunkis	
23	2025–26	Athens	(Spain) Barcelona	(Spain) Real Madrid	85–77		(United States) Joaquim Boumtje-Boumtje	

== Performances ==
=== Performance by club ===
Rank	Club	Titles	Runners-up
1	(Spain) Real Madrid	5; 2015, 2019, 2021, 2023, 2024	2; 2014, 2026
2	(Lithuania) Žalgiris	3; 2003, 2007, 2025	3; 2005, 2006, 2011
3	(Russia) CSKA Moscow	3; 2004, 2005, 2006	0
4	(Spain) Barcelona	2; 2016, 2026	3; 2008, 2013, 2021
5	(Serbia) FMP	2; 2008, 2009	2; 2007, 2010
6	(France) INSEP / Centre Fédéral	2; 2010, 2017	1; 2024
–	(Lithuania) Rytas	2; 2012, 2018	1; 2009
8	(Serbia) Crvena zvezda	1; 2014	2; 2015, 2016
–	(Serbia) Mega Basket	1; 2022	2; 2017, 2019
10	(Croatia) Zagreb	1; 2011	0
–	(Spain) Joventut	1; 2013	0
12	(European Union) Next Generation Select Team	0	2; 2022, 2023
13	(Israel) Maccabi Tel Aviv	0	1; 2003
–	(Italy) Mens Sana Siena	0	1; 2004
–	(Turkey) Fenerbahçe	0	1; 2012
–	(Italy) Stella Azzurra	0	1; 2018
–	(Italy) EA7 Emporio Armani Milan	0	1; 2025

=== Performance by country ===
Rank	Country	Titles	Runners-up
1	Spain	8 Real Madrid (5), Barcelona (2), Joventut (1)	5 Barcelona (3), Real Madrid (2)
2	Lithuania	5 Žalgiris (3), Rytas (2)	4 Žalgiris (3), Rytas (1)
3	Serbia	4 FMP (2), Crvena zvezda (1), Mega Basket (1)	6 FMP (2), Crvena zvezda (2), Mega Basket (2)
4	Russia	3 CSKA Moscow (3)	0
5	France	2 INSEP / Centre Fédéral (2)	1 INSEP / Centre Fédéral (1)
6	Croatia	1 Zagreb (1)	0
7	Italy	0	3 Mens Sana Siena (1), Stella Azzurra (1), EA7 Emporio Armani Milan (1)
8	Israel	0	1 Maccabi Tel Aviv (1)
–	Turkey	0	1 Fenerbahçe (1)

== See also ==
- Junior ABA League
- VTB United Youth League
- EuroLeague
- EuroCup

== Results ==
- International Super Leagues, European National Leagues, Other National Leagues, Tournaments & Cups - RealGM
- Youth Basketball Champions League News, Rumors, Roster, Stats, Awards, Transactions, Depth Charts, Forums - RealGM
- adidas Next Generation Tournament Teams - RealGM
- adidas Next Generation Tournament Teams - RealGM
- adidas Next Generation Tournament Teams - RealGM
