= Ratina =

Settlement in Serbia

Coordinates: 43°42′05″N 20°45′03″E

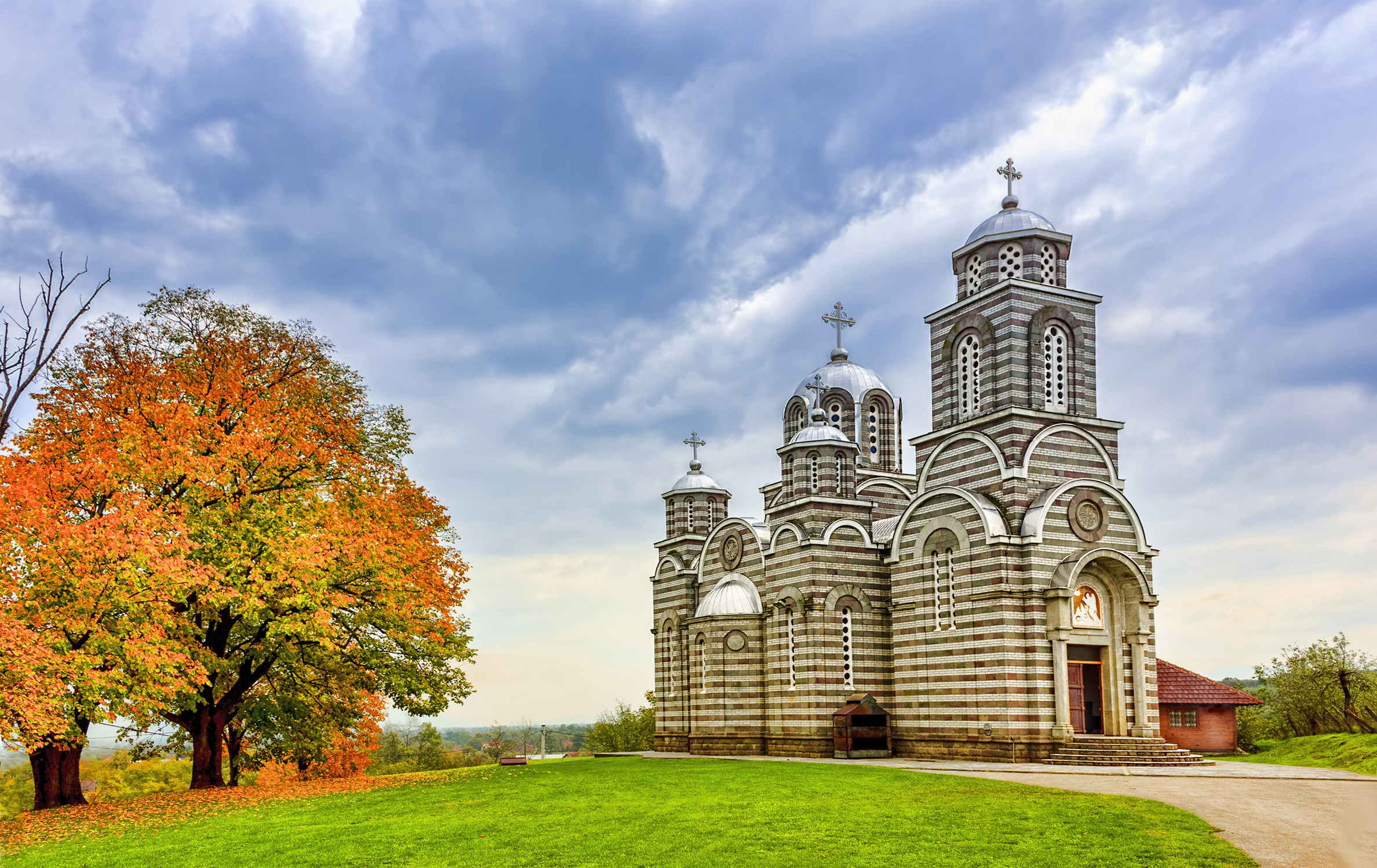
Church of St. John the Baptist in Ratina

Ratina is a suburban community in the municipality of Kraljevo, Serbia. It is located 6 kilometers from the city center and has about 12,000 inhabitants.
