= KK Rtanj =

Basketball club in Boljevac, Serbia

Rtanj
- Leagues: First Regional League of Serbia
- Founded: 1980; 46 years ago
- History: KK Rtanj (1980–present)
- Arena: Boljevac Sports Hall
- Location: Boljevac, Serbia
- Team colors: Blue and White
- President: Milan Grbović
- Head coach: Ivan Simić

Košarkaški klub Rtanj (Serbian Cyrillic: Кошаркашки клуб Ртањ), commonly referred to as KK Rtanj, is a men's basketball club based in Boljevac, Serbia. They are currently competing in the First Regional League of Serbia (3rd-tier).

The club was founded in 1980 and was named after Rtanj, a mountain situated in eastern Serbia.

== Trophies and awards ==
=== Trophies ===
- First Regional League (Eastern Division) (3rd-tier)
  - Winners (2): 2015–16, 2017–18

== Notable players ==
- (Serbia) Boban Marjanović (youth system)
