= Stella Azzurra Roma =

Amateur basketball club in Rome, Italy

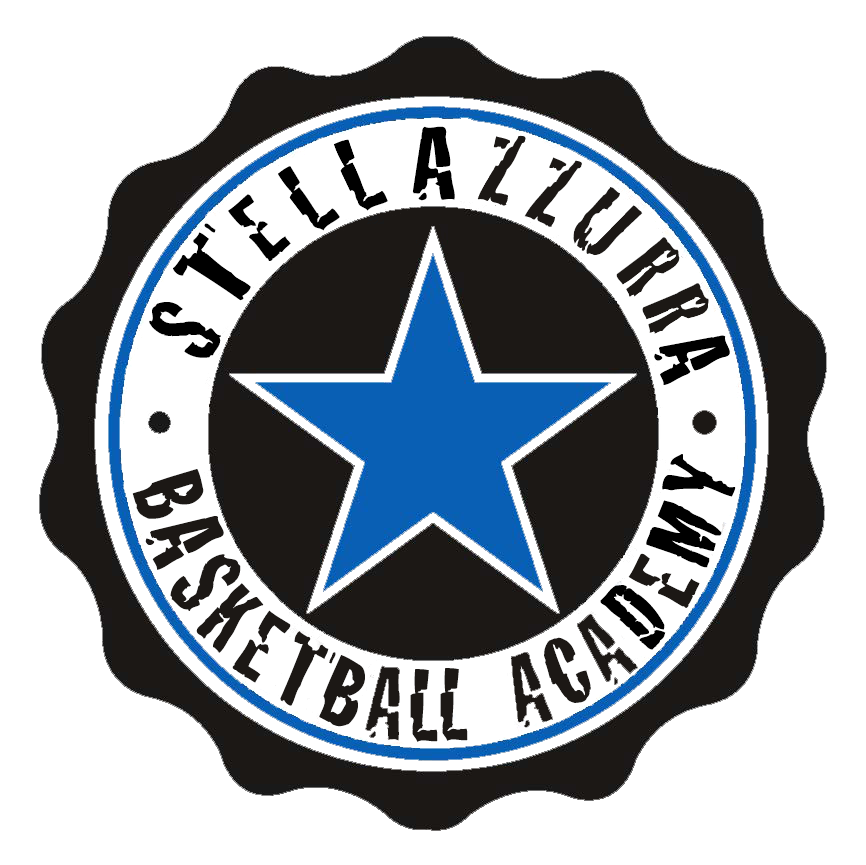
- Leagues: Serie B
- Founded: 1938; 88 years ago
- History: A.S. Stella Azzura; 1938–present
- Arena: Arena Altero Felici
- Location: Rome, Italy
- President: Tommaso Antonelli
- Head coach: Germano D’Arcangeli
- Website: StellaAzzurra.it (in Italian)
Home	Away

Associazione Sportiva Stella Azzurra Roma is an Italian amateur basketball club based in Rome. It plays in the third division Serie B as of the 2015–16 season. The club is mainly known for its excellent youth teams, which participate in European competitions such as the Next Generation Tournament.

== History ==
Stella Azzurra Roma was founded in 1938 by youngsters playing on a pitch in the courtyard of the Collegio San Giuseppe - Istituto De Merode in Rome.The side played in the first division Serie A from 1954 to 1966, then for two other seasons before another period from 1974 to 1980, disappearing from the professional leagues after being relegated from the Serie A2 in 1982.

In May 2015, Stella Azzurra Roma won its first ever national Under-19 title.

In 2018, Stella's under-18 team were the runners-up at the EuroLeague Basketball Next Generation Tournament, losing to BC Lietuvos rytas in the final.

== Honours ==
=== Under-18 Team ===
- EuroLeague Basketball Next Generation Tournament
  - Runners-up (1): 2017–18

== Notable players ==
- (Italy) Andrea Bargnani '02-'03
- (Romania) Robert Bobroczky '14-'15
- (Puerto Rico) Stephen Thompson Jr.

== Notable coaches ==
- (Italy) Valerio Bianchini '74-'79
