= Aleksandar Aranitović =

Serbian basketball player

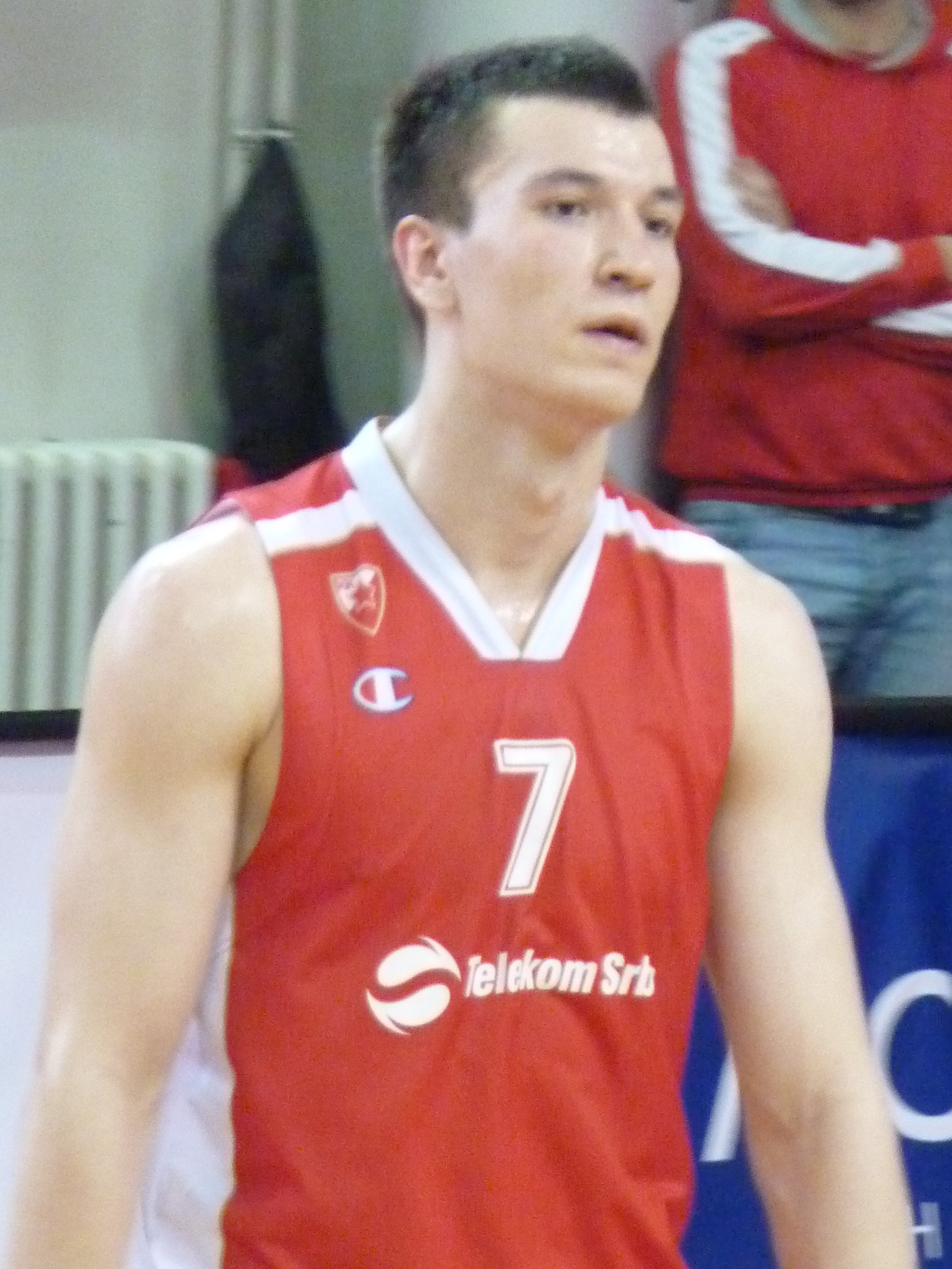
- Aranitović with Crvena zvezda juniors in March 2015

No. 17 – Río Breogán
- Position: Shooting guard
- League: Liga ACB

Personal information
- Born: January 24, 1998 (age 28) Belgrade, FR Yugoslavia
- Listed height: 1.95 m (6 ft 5 in)
- Listed weight: 97 kg (214 lb)

Career information
- NBA draft: 2020: undrafted
- Playing career: 2015–present

Career history
- 2015–2017: Crvena zvezda
- 2015–2016: →Mega Leks
- 2017–2019: Partizan
- 2020: ADA Blois
- 2020–2021: Heroes Den Bosch
- 2021: Mladost Zemun
- 2021–2022: Alytus Dzūkija
- 2022–2024: Cibona
- 2024–present: Río Breogán

Career highlights
- Serbian League champion (2015); Serbian Cup winner (2018); Croatian Cup winner (2023); Euroleague IJT champion (2014)
Medals
Men's basketball
Representing Serbia
FIBA Europe Under-16 Championship
Silver medal – second place	2013 Ukraine	Team
FIBA Under-17 World Championship
Bronze medal – third place	2014 UAE	Team

Aleksandar Aranitović (Serbian Cyrillic: Александар Аранитовић, born 24 January 1998) is a Serbian professional basketball for Breogán of the Liga ACB. Standing at 1.95 m (6 ft 5 in), he plays at the shooting guard position. His older brother Petar is also a professional basketball player.

== Professional career ==
Aranitović played in youth categories with Crvena zvezda. He made his debut with Zvezda's first team during the 2015 Serbian SuperLeague season. On July 16, 2015, Crvena zvezda loaned him to Mega Leks for the 2015–16 season. On January 25, 2016, he signed his first professional contract with Crvena zvezda until 2020. While playing with Mega Leks, he got injured in early February 2016, and later missed the rest of the 2015–16 season. In December 2016, he renewed his injury and later missed the whole 2016–17 season.

On August 9, 2017, Aranitović signed a three-year contract with Partizan. Partizan parted ways with him in December 2019.

In January 2020, Aranitović signed for ADA Blois of the French LNB Pro B.

On September 30, 2020, Aranitović signed a try-out contract with Heroes Den Bosch. In January 2021, Aranitović signed with Mladost Zemun. On September 27, 2022, Aranitović signed a contract with Cibona of the Croatian League.

On June 17, 2024, he was announced by Río Breogán as their new player ahead of the 2024–25 campaign.

== National team career ==
With Serbia's junior national team, Aranitović won the silver medal at the 2013 FIBA Europe Under-16 Championship and the bronze medal at the 2014 FIBA Under-17 World Championship. He also played at the 2014 FIBA Europe Under-16 Championship, 2015 FIBA Europe Under-18 Championship and the 2015 FIBA Under-19 World Championship.
