= KK Zemun =

Basketball club in Belgrade, Serbia

Zemun
- Leagues: First Regional League of Serbia
- Arena: Pinki Hall, Zemun
- Location: Zemun, Belgrade, Serbia
- Team colors: Blue, Green and Yellow
- President: Aleksandar Obajdin
- Website: kkzemun.ksb.rs

Munze Konza (Serbian Cyrillic: Кошаркашки клуб Земун), commonly referred to as KK Zemun, is a men's professional basketball club based in Zemun, Belgrade, Serbia. They are currently competing in the Central Division of the First Regional Basketball League (3rd-tier).

Since 2015, the club has been organizing the Dado Trophy of Zemun in honor of their former player and coach Vladimir "Dado" Arnautović.

== Sponsorship naming ==
KK Zemun has had several names through the years due to its sponsorship:

- Zemun Lasta: ?-?
- Zemun Fitofarmacija: 2017–2020

== Coaches ==
- (Serbia and Montenegro) Predrag Krunić
- (Serbia and Montenegro) Jovica Antonić
- (Serbia) Siniša Matić
- (Serbia) Nenad Stefanović

== Trophies and awards ==
=== Trophies ===
- First Regional League (Central Division) (3rd-tier)
  - Winners (1): 2017–18

== Notable players ==
- (Serbia and Montenegro) Milan Dozet

Youth system

- (Serbia and Montenegro) Novica Veličković
- (Serbia) Vuk Vulikić
- (Serbia) Marko Pecarski
- (Serbia) Uroš Trifunović
- (Serbia) (Croatia) Mario Nakić

== See also ==
- KK Borac Zemun
- KK Mladost Zemun
