= 2014 FIBA Under-17 World Championship squads =

Players' ages as of the tournament's opening day (8 August 2014).

== Group A ==
=== Angola ===
Head coach: (Angola) Manuel Silva

#	Pos	Name	DoB/Age	Height	Club
4	Guard	Eric Amandio	15 June 1998 (aged 16)	1.86 metres (6.1 ft)	(Angola) Petro Atlético de Luanda
5	Guard	Daniel Manuel	24 January 1997 (aged 17)	1.80 metres (5.9 ft)	(Angola) Vila Clotilde
6	Center	Silvio De Sousa	10 July 1998 (aged 16)	2.03 metres (6.7 ft)	(Angola) Primero Agosto
7	Shooting Guard	Avelino Do	9 June 1997 (aged 17)	1.93 metres (6.3 ft)	(Angola) Petro Atlético de Luanda
8	Guard	Edmilson Miranda	8 September 1997 (aged 16)	1.82 metres (6.0 ft)	(Angola) Primero Agosto
9	Shooting Guard	Teodoro Hilario	28 February 1998 (aged 16)	1.93 metres (6.3 ft)	Inter Clube de Angola
10	Forward	Valdir Manuel	5 May 1999 (aged 15)	2.04 metres (6.7 ft)	(Angola) Petro Atlético de Luanda
11	Shooting Guard	Aires Goubel	5 January 1997 (aged 17)	1.92 metres (6.3 ft)	(Angola) Primero Agosto
12	Forward	Joao Jungo	18 October 1997 (aged 16)	1.98 metres (6.5 ft)	(Angola) Vila Clotilde
13	Forward	Bruno Fernandez	15 August 1998 (aged 15)	2.02 metres (6.6 ft)	(Angola) Primero Agosto
14	Shooting Guard	Milton Valente	28 September 1998 (aged 15)	1.98 metres (6.5 ft)	(Angola) Primero Agosto
15	Shooting Guard	Cristiano Xavier	7 January 1998 (aged 16)	1.98 metres (6.5 ft)	(Angola) Petro Atlético de Luanda

=== Greece ===
Head coach: (Greece) Dimitrios Papanikolaou

#	Pos	Name	DoB/Age	Height	Club
4	Shooting Guard	Antonis Koniaris	30 September 1997 (aged 16)	1.91 metres (6.3 ft)	(Greece) Panathinaikos
5	Power Forward	Thanasis Ntouzidis	18 August 1997 (aged 16)	2.04 metres (6.7 ft)	(Greece) Ikaros Kallitheas
6	Shooting Guard	Iakovos Milentigievits	11 January 1997 (aged 17)	1.91 metres (6.3 ft)	(Greece) Aigaleo
7	Point Guard	Dimitris Flionis	8 April 1997 (aged 17)	1.91 metres (6.3 ft)	(Greece) Aris
8	Forward	Ioannis Michaloutsos	9 January 1997 (aged 17)	2.04 metres (6.7 ft)	(Spain) Lugo
9	Guard	Antonis Pefanis	8 February 1997 (aged 17)	1.96 metres (6.4 ft)	(Greece) Proteas Voulas
10	Small Forward	Nikos Diplaros	28 June 1997 (aged 17)	1.91 metres (6.3 ft)	(Greece) Esperos Patron
11	Power Forward	Pantelis Skordas	11 April 1997 (aged 17)	2.00 metres (6.56 ft)	(Greece) Ikaros Kallitheas
12	Small Forward	Nikos Kamaras	25 October 1997 (aged 16)	2.00 metres (6.56 ft)	(Greece) Mantoulidis
13	Shooting Guard	Vassilis Mouratos	24 November 1997 (aged 16)	1.93 metres (6.3 ft)	(Greece) Ag. Anargyroi
14	Center	Georgios Papagiannis	3 July 1997 (aged 17)	2.20 metres (7.2 ft)	(Greece) Panathinaikos
15	Small Forward	Vassilis Charalampopoulos	6 January 1997 (aged 17)	2.04 metres (6.7 ft)	(Greece) Panathinaikos

=== Philippines ===
Head coach: (Philippines) Michael Ray Jarin

#	Pos	Name	DoB/Age	Height	Club
4	Shooting Guard	Jose Go IV	16 January 1997 (aged 17)	1.77 metres (5.8 ft)	(Philippines) Ateneo de Manila University
5	Point Guard	Matthew Nieto	31 March 1997 (aged 17)	1.84 metres (6.0 ft)	(Philippines) Ateneo de Manila University
6	Point Guard	Diego Dario	6 January 1997 (aged 17)	1.70 metres (5.6 ft)	University of the Philippines
7	Point Forward	Michael Nieto	31 March 1997 (aged 17)	1.88 metres (6.2 ft)	(Philippines) Ateneo de Manila University
8	Point Guard	Lorenzo Navarro	30 March 1997 (aged 17)	1.73 metres (5.7 ft)	(Philippines) San Sebastian College - Recoletos
9	Small Forward	Arnie Padilla	31 July 1997 (aged 17)	1.85 metres (6.1 ft)	(Philippines) Far Eastern University
10	Shooting Guard	Jolo Mendoza	31 January 1998 (aged 16)	1.75 metres (5.7 ft)	(Philippines) Ateneo de Manila University
11	Shooting Guard	Mikel Panlilo	21 September 1997 (aged 16)	1.80 metres (5.9 ft)	(Philippines) International School Manila
12	Small Forward	Michael Dela Cruz	8 April 1997 (aged 17)	1.83 metres (6.0 ft)	(Philippines) La Salle Green Hills
13	Center	Carlo Abadeza	19 April 1997 (aged 17)	1.90 metres (6.2 ft)	(Philippines) Arellano University
14	Center	Richard Escoto	21 March 1997 (aged 17)	1.90 metres (6.2 ft)	(Philippines) Far Eastern University
15	Small Forward	Paul Desiderio	2 February 1997 (aged 17)	1.85 metres (6.1 ft)	University of the Philippines

=== United States ===
Head coach: (United States) Don Showalter

#	Pos	Name	DoB/Age	Height	Club
4	Guard	Tyus Battle	23 September 1997 (aged 16)	1.95 metres (6.4 ft)	(United States) Gill St. Bernard’s School
5	Forward	Devearl Ramsay	17 May 1997 (aged 17)	1.80 metres (5.9 ft)	(United States) Sierra Canyon School
6	Guard	Terrance Ferguson	17 May 1998 (aged 16)	1.98 metres (6.5 ft)	(United States) Prime Prep Academy
7	Guard	Malik Newman	21 February 1997 (aged 17)	1.93 metres (6.3 ft)	(United States) Callaway High School
8	Guard	V.J. King	22 January 1997 (aged 17)	1.98 metres (6.5 ft)	(United States) St. Vincent–St. Mary High School
9	Guard	Josh Jackson	10 February 1997 (aged 17)	2.03 metres (6.7 ft)	(United States) Consortium College Prep
10	Guard	Jayson Tatum	3 March 1998 (aged 16)	2.05 metres (6.7 ft)	(United States) Chaminade College Prep
11	Shooting Guard	Henry Ellenson	13 January 1997 (aged 17)	2.08 metres (6.8 ft)	(United States) Rice Lake High School
12	Forward	Caleb Swanigan	18 April 1997 (aged 17)	2.03 metres (6.7 ft)	(United States) Homestead High School
13	Forward	Harry Giles	22 April 1997 (aged 17)	2.05 metres (6.7 ft)	(United States) Wesleyan Christian Academy
14	Forward	Ivan Rabb	4 February 1997 (aged 17)	2.08 metres (6.8 ft)	(United States) Bishop O'Dowd High School
15	Center	Diamond Stone	10 February 1997 (aged 17)	2.08 metres (6.8 ft)	(United States) Dominican High School

== Group B ==
=== Australia ===
Head coach:

#	Pos	Name	DoB/Age	Height	Club
4	Shooting Guard	Dejan Vasiljevic	26 April 1997 (aged 17)	1.87 metres (6.1 ft)	(Australia) Centre of Excellence
5	Guard	Jayden Hodgson	25 May 1997 (aged 17)	1.80 metres (5.9 ft)	(Australia) Central Coast Waves
6	Point Guard	Matthew Owies	19 March 1997 (aged 17)	1.80 metres (5.9 ft)	(Australia) Melbourne Tigers
7	Shooting Guard	Tom Wilson	24 June 1997 (aged 17)	1.91 metres (6.3 ft)	(Australia) Centre of Excellence
8	Power Forward	Abiola Akintola	13 February 1997 (aged 17)	1.95 metres (6.4 ft)	(Australia) Centre of Excellence
9	Power Forward	Kouat Noi	29 October 1997 (aged 16)	1.95 metres (6.4 ft)	(Australia) Newcastle Hunters
10	Shooting Guard	Trent McMullan	24 February 1997 (aged 17)	1.93 metres (6.3 ft)	(Australia) Wodonga
11	Small Forward	Kyle Clark	3 March 1997 (aged 17)	1.96 metres (6.4 ft)	(Australia) Wynyard Wildcats
12	Small Forward	Jack White	5 August 1997 (aged 17)	1.95 metres (6.4 ft)	(Australia) Centre of Excellence
13	Center	Harry Froling	20 April 1998 (aged 16)	2.05 metres (6.7 ft)	(Australia) Centre of Excellence
14	Center	Deng Gak	12 May 1998 (aged 16)	2.06 metres (6.8 ft)	(Australia) Centre of Excellence
15	Center	Isaac Humphries	5 January 1998 (aged 16)	2.10 metres (6.9 ft)	(Australia) Centre of Excellence

=== Canada ===
Head coach:

#	Pos	Name	DoB/Age	Height	Club
4	Guard	Brandon Cyrus	15 October 1997 (aged 16)	1.93 metres (6.3 ft)	(Canada) Torrey Pines High School
5	Guard	Koby Mcewan	29 July 1997 (aged 17)	1.93 metres (6.3 ft)	(Canada) Wasatch Academy
6	Guard	Howard Washington, Jr.	24 March 1998 (aged 16)	1.87 metres (6.1 ft)	(United States) Canisius High School
7	Forward	Jerome Desrosiers	2 November 1997 (aged 16)	1.98 metres (6.5 ft)	(Canada) Northfield Mount Hermon
8	Guard	Jamal Murray	23 February 1997 (aged 17)	1.95 metres (6.4 ft)	(Canada) Athlete Institute
9	Forward	Eddie Ekiyor	3 May 1997 (aged 17)	2.03 metres (6.7 ft)	(Canada) New Hampton Prep
10	Center	Kalif Young	5 April 1997 (aged 17)	2.03 metres (6.7 ft)	(Canada) Hodan Nalayeh Secondary School
11	Guard	Marcus Ottey	13 March 1997 (aged 17)	1.85 metres (6.1 ft)	(Canada) St. Benedict Prep
12	Guard	Marquell Fraser	1 March 1997 (aged 17)	1.93 metres (6.3 ft)	(Canada) Mountain Mission School
13	Forward	Nicola Djogo	4 June 1997 (aged 17)	1.98 metres (6.5 ft)	(Canada) Saltfleet Academy
14	Guard	Nelson Kaputo	24 April 1997 (aged 17)	1.85 metres (6.1 ft)	(Canada) St. Michael's College School
15	Forward	Daniel Cummings	14 March 1997 (aged 17)	2.10 metres (6.9 ft)	(Canada) St. Benedict Prep

=== France ===
Head coach:

#	Pos	Name	DoB/Age	Height	Club
4	Point Guard	Arthur Leboeuf	10 March 1997 (aged 17)	1.75 metres (5.7 ft)	(France) Centre Fédéral
5	Point Guard	Adrien Labanére	6 April 1997 (aged 17)	1.75 metres (5.7 ft)	(France) Elan Béarnis Pau-Orthez
6	Forward	Olivier Cortale	16 March 1997 (aged 17)	2.06 metres (6.8 ft)	(France) Centre Fédéral
7	Center	Jonathan Jeanne	3 July 1997 (aged 17)	2.13 metres (7.0 ft)	(France) Centre Fédéral
8	Guard	Luc Loubaki	20 January 1997 (aged 17)	1.91 metres (6.3 ft)	(France) Centre Fédéral
9	Guard	Lucas Hergott	26 December 1997 (aged 16)	1.97 metres (6.5 ft)	(France) ASVEL
10	Small Forward	Carl Ponsar	2 April 1997 (aged 17)	2.00 metres (6.56 ft)	(France) SPO Rouen
11	Point Guard	Grégory Bengaber	5 March 1997 (aged 17)	1.83 metres (6.0 ft)	(France) Centre Fédéral
12	Center	Amine Noua	7 February 1997 (aged 17)	2.00 metres (6.56 ft)	(France) ASVEL
13	Forward	Stéphane Gombauld	5 March 1997 (aged 17)	2.02 metres (6.6 ft)	(France) Centre Fédéral
14	Small Forward	Gauthier Denis	1 April 1997 (aged 17)	1.98 metres (6.5 ft)	(France) STB Le Havre
15	Forward	Thomas hufschmidt	5 September 1997 (aged 16)	1.98 metres (6.5 ft)	(France) Le Mans Sarthe Basket

=== Japan ===
Head coach:

#	Pos	Name	DoB/Age	Height	Club
4	Forward	Satoru Maeta	6 March 1997 (aged 17)	1.88 metres (6.2 ft)	(Japan) Yamagata Minami High School
5	Guard	Yutaro Hayashi	6 May 1997 (aged 17)	1.80 metres (5.9 ft)	(Japan) Makuhari Sogo High School
6	Guard	Shogo Taira	2 April 1997 (aged 17)	1.70 metres (5.6 ft)	(Japan) Funabashi High School
7	Guard	Kaito Muto	11 August 1997 (aged 16)	1.74 metres (5.7 ft)	(Japan) Fukuoka Daiichi High School
8	Guard	Seiya Igarashi	13 June 1997 (aged 17)	1.78 metres (5.8 ft)	(Japan) Omiya Kita High School
9	Forward	Yuto Nomi	10 April 1997 (aged 17)	1.81 metres (5.9 ft)	(Japan) Meisei High School
10	Forward	Hayato Maki	14 December 1997 (aged 16)	1.87 metres (6.1 ft)	(Japan) Fukuoka Ohori High School
11	Center	Yuta Kono	29 January 1998 (aged 16)	1.90 metres (6.2 ft)	(Japan) Fukuoka Daiichi High School
12	Center	Hiroto Gunji	18 April 1997 (aged 17)	1.92 metres (6.3 ft)	(Japan) Tsuchiura Nichidai High School
13	Center	Daniel Dan Nnanna	2 June 1997 (aged 17)	1.94 metres (6.4 ft)	
14	Center	Rui Hachimura	8 February 1998 (aged 16)	1.97 metres (6.5 ft)	(Japan) Meisei High School
15	Center	Gen Hiraiwa	5 December 1997 (aged 16)	1.98 metres (6.5 ft)	(Japan) Tsuchiura Nichidai High School

== Group C ==
=== Italy ===
Head coach: F Luigi Papa

=== Puerto Rico ===
Head coach:

=== Spain ===
Head coach:

=== United Arab Emirates ===
Head coach:

== Group D ==
=== Argentina ===
Head coach:

=== China ===
Head coach:

=== Egypt ===
Head coach:

=== Serbia ===
Head coach:
