= FIBA Under-17 Basketball World Cup All-Tournament Team =

Youth basketball award

The FIBA Under-17 Basketball World Cup All-Tournament Team is a bi-annual award, that is given by FIBA, to the five best players of the FIBA Under-17 World Cup.

== Honourees ==
Year	First Team			Second Team			Ref.
Year	Player	Position	Team	Player	Position	Team	
2010	Kevin Pangos	PG/SG	Canada	not awarded			
2010	Bradley Beal	SG/SF	United States	not awarded			
2010	Mateusz Ponitka	SG/SF	Poland	not awarded			
2010	James Michael McAdoo	PF	United States	not awarded			
2010	Przemek Karnowski	C	Poland	not awarded			
2012	Dante Exum	PG/SG	Australia	not awarded			
2012	Mario Hezonja	SG/SF	Croatia	not awarded			
2012	Justise Winslow	SF	United States	not awarded			
2012	Gabriel Deck	SF/PF	Argentina	not awarded			
2012	Jahlil Okafor	C	United States	not awarded			
2014	Malik Newman	PG/SG	United States	not awarded			
2014	Dejan Vasiljevic	SG	Australia	not awarded			
2014	Nikola Rakićević	SG/SF	Serbia	not awarded			
2014	Isaac Humphries	PF/C	Australia	not awarded			
2014	Diamond Stone	C	United States	not awarded			
2016	Collin Sexton	PG	United States	not awarded			
2016	Arnas Velička	PG/SG	Lithuania	not awarded			
2016	Džanan Musa	SG/SF	Bosnia and Herzegovina	not awarded			
2016	Sergi Martínez	PF	Spain	not awarded			
2016	Wendell Carter Jr.	PF/C	United States	not awarded			
2018	André Curbelo	PG	Puerto Rico	not awarded			
2018	Killian Hayes	SG	France	not awarded			
2018	Jalen Green	SG	United States	not awarded			
2018	Vernon Carey	PF	United States	not awarded			
2018	Oumar Ballo	C	Mali	not awarded			
2022	Lucas Langarita	PG	Spain	not awarded			
2022	Ilane Fibleuil	SG	France	not awarded			
2022	Koa Peat	SF	United States	not awarded			
2022	Cooper Flagg	PF	United States	not awarded			
2022	Izan Almansa	C	Spain	not awarded			
2024	Kaan Onat	PG	Turkey	Derin Can Ostun	SG	Turkey	
2024	AJ Dybantsa	PG/SG	United States	Koa Peat (2)	SF/PF	United States	
2024	Oscar Goodman	SF/PF	New Zealand	Tyran Stokes	SF/PF	United States	
2024	Maikcol Perez	SF/PF	Italy	Diego Garavaglia	SF/PF	Italy	
2024	Cameron Boozer	SF/PF	United States	Artūras Butajevas	C	Lithuania	
2026	Beckham Black	PG	United States	Darius Karutasu	SG	Turkey	
2026	Ömer Kutluay	PG	Turkey	DJ Gaines	PG	Puerto Rico	
2026	Luke Paul	PG/SG	Australia	Matija Lukić	SG	Serbia	
2026	Nikola Kusturica	SF	Serbia	CJ Rosser	SF/PF	United States	
2026	Joaquim Boumtje-Boumtje	C	United States	Nathan Soliman	SF/PF	France	
