= Serbia men's national under-16 and under-17 basketball team =

Serbia men's national under-16 and under-17 basketball team may refer to:

- Serbia men's national under-16 basketball team
- Serbia men's national under-17 basketball team
