= Dimitrios Papanikolaou =

Greek basketball player & coach (born 1977)

Dimitrios Papanikolaou Δημήτρης Παπανικολάου
Personal information
- Born: February 7, 1977 (age 49) Nea Liosia, Athens, Greece
- Listed height: 6 ft 7.5 in (2.02 m)
- Listed weight: 230 lb (104 kg)

Career information
- Playing career: 1992–2011
- Position: Shooting guard / small forward
- Number: 7, 6, 4
- Coaching career: 2012–present

Career history

Playing
- 1992–1995: Sporting
- 1995–2002: Olympiacos
- 2002–2003: Makedonikos
- 2003–2007: Panathinaikos
- 2007–2009: AEK Athens
- 2009–2010: Panionios
- 2010–2011: Peristeri

Coaching
- 2012: AEK Athens
- 2012: Ilysiakos
- 2013: Greece (assistant)
- 2014: Greece Under-17

Career highlights
- As player: 2× EuroLeague champion (1997, 2007); 6× Greek League champion (1996, 1997, 2004–2007); 5× Greek Cup winner (1997, 2002, 2005–2007); 7× Greek League All-Star (1996 II, 1998, 1999, 2001–2003, 2006); Greek All-Star Game Slam Dunk Champion (2001)
Medals
Men's basketball
Representing Greece
FIBA Europe Under-16 Championship
Gold medal – first place	1993 Turkey	Under-16
FIBA Under-19 World Cup
Gold medal – first place	1995 Greece	Under-19

Dimitrios Papanikolaou (alternate spelling: Dimitris) (Greek: Δημήτρης Παπανικολάου; born February 7, 1977, in Nea Liosia, Athens, Greece) is a retired Greek professional basketball player and a professional basketball coach. He is 2.02 m (6 ft 7 1/2 in) tall. He spent most of his career playing at the shooting guard and small forward positions, although he also played at the power forward position late in his career.

== Professional career ==
Papanikolaou began his professional career in 1992 with the Greek club Sporting Athens when he was transferred from the amateur club Asteras Neon Liosion. He then transferred to Olympiacos Piraeus in the year 1995. With Olympiacos, he won 2 Greek Basket League championships (1996, 1997), 2 Greek Cups (1997, 2002), the EuroLeague championship (1997), and also the Triple Crown (1997). In 1997 summer Papanikolaou left Olympiakos for Virtus Bologna, but he wasn't free for the Italian club until his 21st birthday. Finally, after 5 months without official action in Bologna, he signed a new contract with Olympiacos.

In 2002, he moved to Makedonikos Kozani, and then in 2003, he moved to Panathinaikos Athens. With Panathinaikos, they won 4 Greek Basket League championships (2004, 2005, 2006, 2007), 3 Greek Cups (2005, 2006, 2007), the EuroLeague championship (2007), and also the Triple Crown (2007). In 2007, he moved to AEK Athens, in 2009 to Panionios, and a year later he joined Peristeri. He announced his retirement from professional basketball on August 22, 2011.

== National team career ==
With the Greece men's national under-16 basketball team, Papanikolaou won the gold medal at the 1993 FIBA Europe Under-16 Championship. With the Greece men's national under-19 basketball team, he also won the gold medal at the 1995 FIBA Under-19 World Cup. With the Greece men's national basketball team, Papanikolaou competed at the 1998 FIBA World Cup, and finished in 4th place in the world with Greece.

He also competed with Greece at the following EuroBaskets: the 1997 EuroBasket, the 1999 EuroBasket, the 2001 EuroBasket, and the 2003 EuroBasket. Papanikolaou was also a member of the Greece team at the 1996 Summer Olympic Games; and he was also a member of Greece's team at the 2004 Summer Olympic Games. In both Olympics, Greece managed to finish 5th in the world.

== Coaching career ==
On January 24, 2012, Papanikolaou began his coaching career, as the head coach of AEK Athens, where he stayed for about one month. In the summer of 2012, he became the head coach of Ilysiakos. In 2013, he became an assistant coach for the Greece men's national basketball team. In 2014, he coached the Greece men's national under-17 basketball team at the 2014 FIBA Under-17 World Championship.

== Personal life ==
He hails from Preveza and Nafpaktia

== Honors and accomplishments ==
=== Pro career ===
- 6× Greek League Champion: (1996, 1997, 2004, 2005, 2006, 2007)
- 7× Greek League All-Star: (1996 II, 1998, 1999, 2001, 2002, 2003, 2006)
- 5× Greek Cup Winner: (1997, 2002, 2005, 2006, 2007)
- 2× EuroLeague Champion: (1997, 2007)
- EuroLeague All-Final Four Team: (1997)
- 2× Triple Crown: Champion (1997, 2007)
- Greek All-Star Game Slam Dunk Champion: (2001)

=== Greece junior national team ===
- 1993 FIBA Europe Under-16 Championship: Gold
- 1995 FIBA Under-19 World Cup: Gold
