= Vassilis Ioannou =

Greek basketball player

Vasilis Ioannou
Papagou
- Position: Shooting guard
- League: Greek Elite League

Personal information
- Born: December 1, 2008 (age 17) Greece
- Listed height: 6 ft 4 in (1.93 m)

Career information
- Playing career: 2024–present

Career history
- 2024–present: AEK Athens
- 2026–present: →Papagou

Vasilis Ioannou (Greek: Βασίλης Ιωάννου; born December 1, 2008) is a Greek basketball player for Papagou of the Greek Elite League. He is a 1.93 m (6 ft 4 in) tall shooting guard.

== Youth career ==
Ioannou began his basketball development with Panerythraikos B.C. before joining the youth programme of AEK Athens. During the 2024–25 Rising Stars Greece competition, Ioannou played for AEK's youth team and was one of the team's leading performers. In the quarter-finals of the Rising Stars Final 8 against Panionios, he scored 19 points and made the game-winning three-pointer at the buzzer to give AEK an 82–79 victory. Ioannou was subsequently selected to the Rising Stars competition's best five for the 2024–25 season.

== Professional career ==
Ioannou was included to AEK's squad for a match against Lavrio in March 2025. He made his oficcial debut against Maroussi, becoming the second youngesty player of AEK to debut in the Greek Basketball League. On August 21, 2026, he signed his first professional contract with the club until 2030, and was loaned to Papagou for the 2026-27 season.

== International career ==
Ioannou represented Greece at youth level and was selected for the Greek under-17 national team in 2025.
