= Stefan Kenić =

Serbian basketball player (born 1997)

Free Agent
- Position: Small forward

Personal information
- Born: 27 April 1997 (age 29) Belgrade, Serbia, FR Yugoslavia
- Listed height: 2.06 m (6 ft 9 in)
- Listed weight: 101 kg (223 lb)

Career information
- College: Cleveland State (2017–2019); Chattanooga (2019–2021)
- NBA draft: 2021: undrafted
- Playing career: 2015–present

Career history
- 2015–2016: Crvena zvezda
- 2015–2016: → FMP
- 2016–2017: Smederevo 1953
- 2021–2022: Borac Banja Luka
- 2022–2023: Twarde Pierniki Toruń
- 2023–2024: Arka Gdynia

Career highlights
- Euroleague IJT champion (2014)
Medals
Men's basketball
Representing Serbia
U16 European Championship
Silver medal – second place	2013 Ukraine	U16 Team
U17 World Cup
Bronze medal – third place	2014 UAE	U17 Team

Stefan Kenić (Serbian Cyrillic: Стефан Кенић, born 27 April 1997) is a Serbian professional basketball player who last played for Arka Gdynia of the Polish Basketball League (PLK). He played college basketball for the Cleveland State Vikings and the Chattanooga Mocs.

== Early career ==
Kenić grew up with Crvena zvezda youth teams. He won the 2014 Euroleague NIJT.

== College career ==
On 2 June 2017 Kenić committed to play basketball for the Cleveland State Vikings.

As a freshman, Kenić appeared in 35 games (including 31 starts) at the Cleveland State Vikings in their 2017–18 season. He made the first career start against the Akron on 11 November 2017 with nine points, three rebounds, two blocks and two steals. In the freshman season he averaged 9.5 points and 3.3 rebounds per game.

== Professional career ==
On 13 May 2015 Kenić signed the first professional contract with Crvena zvezda. He was loaned to FMP for the 2015–16 season. During the 2016–17 season, he played for the Smederevo 1953.

In August 2021, Kenić signed for the Bosnian team Borac Banja Luka.

On 31 July 2022 he signed with Twarde Pierniki Toruń of the Polish Basketball League (PLK).

On 17 July 2023 he signed with Arka Gdynia of the Polish Basketball League (PLK).

== National team career ==
Kenić was a member of the Serbian U-16 national basketball team that won the silver medal at the 2013 FIBA Europe Under-16 Championship in Ukraine. He was a member of the Serbian U-17 national basketball team that won the bronze medal at the 2014 FIBA Under-17 World Championship in the United Arab Emirates.
