= David Miladinović =

Serbian basketball player

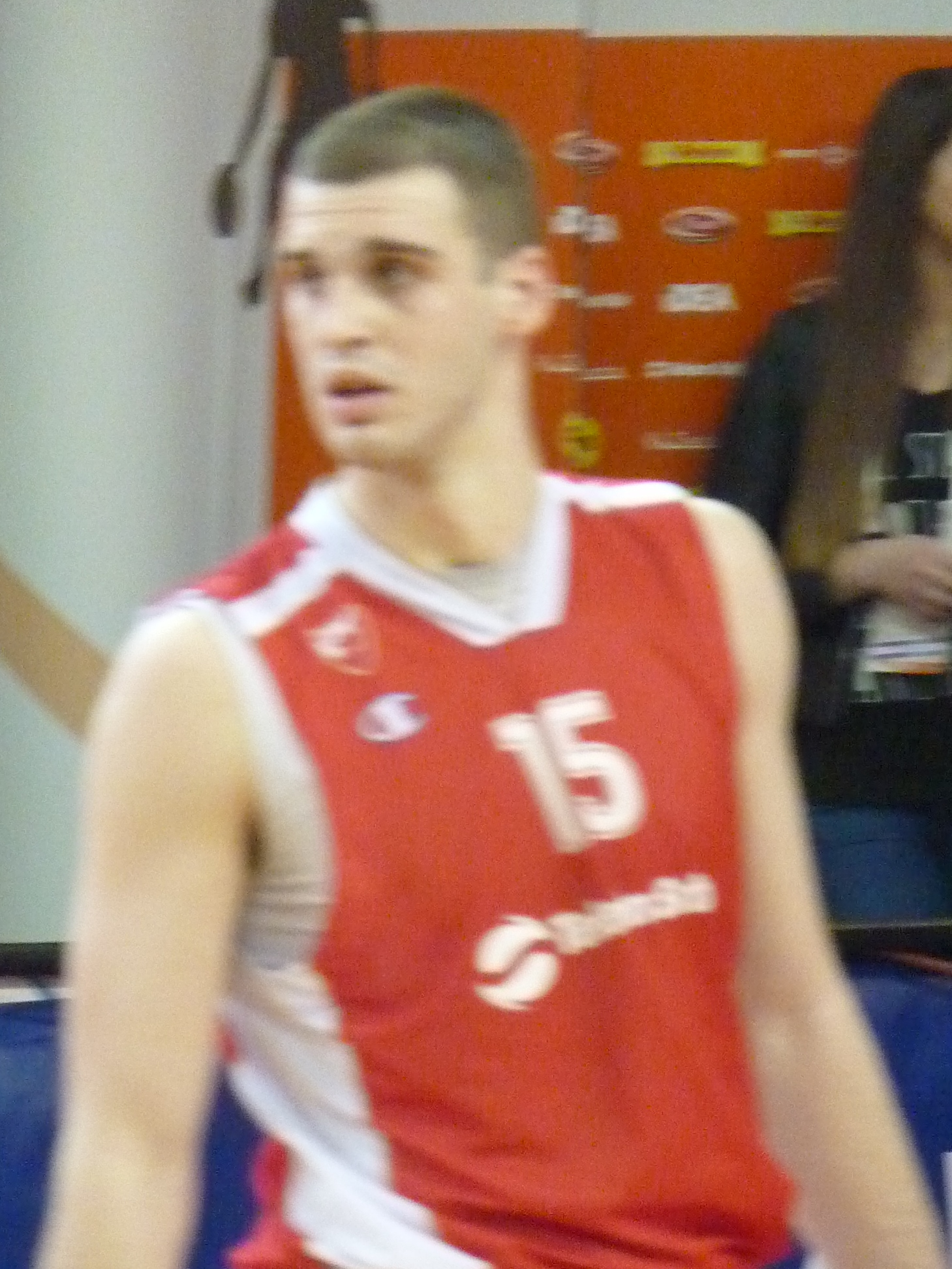

No. 15 – Sloboda Užice
- Position: Center
- League: Basketball League of Serbia

Personal information
- Born: May 18, 1997 (age 29) Smederevska Palanka, Serbia, FR Yugoslavia
- Listed height: 2.09 m (6 ft 10 in)
- Listed weight: 110 kg (243 lb)

Career information
- NBA draft: 2019: undrafted
- Playing career: 2014–present

Career history
- 2014–2016: FMP
- 2016–2017: Napredak Rubin
- 2017–2018: Dynamic VIP PAY
- 2018–2019: AV Ohrid
- 2019: Kumanovo
- 2019–2020: Novi Pazar
- 2020–2021: Iskra Svit
- 2021–present: Sloboda Užice

Career highlights
- Euroleague IJT champion (2014)
Medals
Men's basketball
Representing Serbia
U16 European Championship
Silver medal – second place	2013 Ukraine	U16 Team
U17 World Cup
Bronze medal – third place	2014 UAE	U17 Team

David Miladinović (Serbian Cyrillic: Давид Миладиновић, born May 18, 1997) is a Serbian basketball player for Sloboda Užice of the Basketball League of Serbia.

== Early career ==
Miladinović grew up with the Crvena zvezda youth team. He won the 2014 Euroleague NIJT.

== Playing career ==
Miladinović started his professional basketball career in 2014 with FMP from Belgrade where he played for two seasons in the Basketball League of Serbia. During the 2016–17 season, he played for the Napredak Rubin from Kruševac. Prior to the 2017–18 season, he signed for the Dynamic VIP PAY of the Basketball League of Serbia and the ABA League Second Division. He left Dynamic in summer 2018.

Miladinović played for AV Ohrid during the 2018–19 season. Miladinović signed for Kumanovo for the 2019–20 season.

== International career ==
Miladinović was a member of the Serbian U-16 national basketball team that won the silver medal at the 2013 FIBA Europe Under-16 Championship in Ukraine. He was a member of the Serbian U-17 national basketball team that won the bronze medal at the 2014 FIBA Under-17 World Championship in the United Arab Emirates.
