= 2014 FIBA Under-17 World Championship =

Tournament details
- Host country: United Arab Emirates
- City: Dubai
- Dates: 8–16 August
- Teams: 16 (from 5 confederations)
- Venues: 3 (in 1 host city)

Final positions
- Champions: United States (3rd title)

Tournament statistics
- MVP: (United States) Malik Newman
- Top scorer: (Japan) Hachimura (22.6)
- Top rebounds: (Puerto Rico) Toro (13.6)
- Top assists: (Serbia) Peno (3.4)
- PPG (Team): United States (104.1)
- RPG (Team): United States (56.9)
- APG (Team): United States (15.6)

Official website
- www.fiba.basketball

The 2014 FIBA Under-17 World Championship (Arabic: بطولة العالم لكرة السلة 2014 تحت 17 سنة ) was the 3rd edition of the FIBA Under-17 World Championship, the biennial international men's youth basketball championship contested by the U17 national teams of the member associations of FIBA.

It was hosted by Dubai, United Arab Emirates from 8 to 16 August 2014. This edition of the tournament was also expanded to sixteen teams. The preliminary round took place in Al-Ahli Arena and Al-Wasl Arena, with the Hamdan Sports Complex hosting the final round. This was the first FIBA U17 World Championship that was held outside of Europe.

The United States won their third consecutive title by defeating Australia, in a rematch of the last edition, 99–92 in the final.

== Qualification ==
Sixteen teams had qualified for this year's edition.

- 2013 FIBA Africa Under-16 Championship
  - Angola
  - Egypt
- 2013 FIBA Asia Under-16 Championship
  - China
  - Philippines
  - Japan
- 2013 FIBA Americas Under-16 Championship
  - Argentina
  - Canada
  - Puerto Rico
  - United States
- 2013 FIBA Europe Under-16 Championship
  - France
  - Greece
  - Italy
  - Serbia
  - Spain
- 2013 FIBA Oceania Under-17 Championship
  - Australia
- Host nation
  - United Arab Emirates

== Preliminary round ==
The draw took place on 12 February 2014.

=== Group A ===
Team	Pld	W	L	PF	PA	PD	Pts
United States	3	3	0	306	193	+113	6
Greece	3	2	1	220	199	+21	5
Angola	3	1	2	189	233	−44	4
Philippines	3	0	3	201	291	−90	3

8 August 2014
15:45

Boxscore

Angola	82–72	Philippines
Scoring by quarter: 15–12, 26–20, 20–20, 21–20
Pts: Jungo 26; Rebs: Manuel 13; Asts: Miranda 4		Pts: Mendoza 16; Rebs: Desiderio 10; Asts: Desiderio 3

Al-Ahli Arena, Dubai
Referees: Damir Javor (SLO), Tomasz Trawicki (POL), Ricardo Hayles (JAM)

8 August 2014
21:00

Boxscore

Greece	73–83	United States
Scoring by quarter: 19–28, 18–17, 19–21, 17–17
Pts: Charalampopoulos 17; Rebs: Papagiannis 11; Asts: Papagiannis 3		Pts: Stone 22; Rebs: Stone 10; Asts: Giles 4

Al-Ahli Arena, Dubai
Referees: Carlos Cortes (ESP), Timothy Brown (NZL), Eduardo Albano (BRA)

9 August 2014
16:30

Boxscore

United States	99–56	Angola
Scoring by quarter: 27–8, 23–17, 29–15, 20–16
Pts: Giles 14; Rebs: Stone 12; Asts: Ramsey, Jackson 4		Pts: De Sousa 17; Rebs: Fernando 13; Asts: Do 3

Al-Wasl Arena, Dubai
Referees: Petri Mäntylä (FIN), Hatim Al-Harbi (KSA), Mohamed El-Menshawy (EGY)

9 August 2014
18:45

Boxscore

Philippines	65–85	Greece
Scoring by quarter: 17–25, 9–21, 7–17, 32–22
Pts: Mendoza 19; Rebs: M. Nieto 13; Asts: Dario 4		Pts: Pefanis 26; Rebs: Ntouzidis 11; Asts: Flionis 4

Al-Wasl Arena, Dubai
Referees: Saverio Lanzarini (ITA), Chung Yi-chih (TPE), Americo Rodríguez (VEN)

11 August 2014
16:30

Boxscore

Angola	51–62	Greece
Scoring by quarter: 12–18, 16–19, 6–16, 17–9
Pts: Fernandes 16; Rebs: De Sousa 12; Asts: Amandio 4		Pts: Charalampopoulos 15; Rebs: Charalampopoulos 9 Asts: Milentigievits 3

Al-Wasl Arena, Dubai
Referees: Jesed Díaz (PUR), Aare Halliko (EST), Ilya Putenko (RUS)

11 August 2014
18:45

Boxscore

United States	124–64	Philippines
Scoring by quarter: 32–16, 29–16, 29–20, 34–12
Pts: Newman, Jackson 16; Rebs: Jackson, Stone 11; Asts: Jackson 5		Pts: Mendoza 19; Rebs: Nieto, Michael 5 Asts: three players 3

Al-Ahli Arena, Dubai
Referees: Fabricio Vito (ARG), Youssouf Maiga (MLI), Zhoobin Jalili (IRN)

=== Group B ===
Team	Pld	W	L	PF	PA	PD	Pts	Tie
France	3	2	1	253	201	+52	5	1–1; 1.05
Canada	3	2	1	247	202	+45	5	1–1; 1.01
Australia	3	2	1	255	250	+5	5	1–1; 0.95
Japan	3	0	3	187	289	−102	3	

8 August 2014
13:30

Boxscore

Japan	84–97 (OT)	Australia
Scoring by quarter: 14–27, 17–14, 25–19, 21–17, Overtime: 7–20
Pts: Hachimura 22; Rebs: Hachimura 9 Asts: Hayashi 6		Pts: Vasiljevic 23; Rebs: Humphries 14; Asts: Hodgson 2

Al-Wasl Arena, Dubai
Referees: Aare Halliko (EST), Mohamed El-Menshawy (EGY), Julio Anaya (PAN)

8 August 2014
18:45

Boxscore

France	76–66	Canada
Scoring by quarter: 15–25, 15–17, 22–12, 24–12
Pts: Gombauld 28; Rebs: Gombauld 20; Asts: Loubaki 5		Pts: Ekiyor, Cummings 14; Rebs: Ekiyor 7 Asts: Murray 3

Al-Wasl Arena, Dubai
Referees: Sinisa Herceg (CRO), Harja Jaladri (INA), Jesed Díaz (PUR)

9 August 2014
14:15

Boxscore

Canada	96–52	Japan
Scoring by quarter: 14–19, 32–14, 28–7, 22–12
Pts: Desrosiers 20; Rebs: Young 8 Asts: Cummings 4		Pts: Hachimura, Hiraiwa 13; Rebs: Hiraiwa 10; Asts: Maki 2

Al-Ahli Arena, Dubai
Referees: Jurgis Laurinavicius (LTU), Ersan Kartal (TUR), Ilya Putenko (RUS)

9 August 2014
16:30

Boxscore

Australia	84–81	France
Scoring by quarter: 21–18, 22–24, 20–20, 21–19
Pts: Vasiljevic 18; Rebs: Wilson 8 Asts: Owies 4		Pts: Gombauld 23; Rebs: Noua 9 Asts: Hergott 2

Al-Ahli Arena, Dubai
Referees: Fabricio Vito (ARG), Jonathan Sterling (USA), Zhoobin Jalili (IRN)

11 August 2014
14:15

Boxscore

Japan	51–96	France
Scoring by quarter: 12–22, 13–27, 14–27, 12–20
Pts: Hachimura 27; Rebs: Hachimura 8 Asts: Igarashi, Hiraiwa 2		Pts: Denis 24; Rebs: Noua 12; Asts: Bengaber 3

Al-Wasl Arena, Dubai
Referees: Petri Mäntylä (FIN), Chung Yi-chih (TPE), Americo Rodríguez (VEN)

11 August 2014
16:30

Boxscore

Canada	85–74	Australia
Scoring by quarter: 22–25, 15–8, 22–18, 26–23
Pts: Murray 25; Rebs: Murray 7 Asts: Ekiyor 3		Pts: Humphries 41; Rebs: Humphries 19; Asts: Owies 4

Al-Ahli Arena, Dubai
Referees: Carlos Cortes (ESP), Ricardo Hayles (JAM), Saverio Lanzarini (ITA)

=== Group C ===
Team	Pld	W	L	PF	PA	PD	Pts
Puerto Rico	3	3	0	235	169	+66	6
Italy	3	2	1	236	140	+96	5
Spain	3	1	2	253	158	+95	4
United Arab Emirates	3	0	3	112	369	−257	3

8 August 2014
13:30

Boxscore

Puerto Rico	67–65	Spain
Scoring by quarter: 19–12, 16–19, 10–21, 22–13
Pts: Toro 16; Rebs: Allende 12; Asts: Pacheco 3		Pts: López-Arostegui 15; Rebs: García 8 Asts: García 3

Al-Ahli Arena, Dubai
Referees: Fabricio Vito (ARG), Petri Mäntylä (FIN), Chung Yi-chih (TPE)

8 August 2014
18:45

Boxscore

United Arab Emirates	32–121	Italy
Scoring by quarter: 8–32, 7–28, 10–33, 7–28
Pts: Juma 17; Rebs: Al-Mehairi 6 Asts: Saad, Suwais 1		Pts: Tote 22; Rebs: Pecchia 9 Asts: Savoldelli, Bucarelli 4

Al-Ahli Arena, Dubai
Referees: Jurgis Laurinavičius (LTU), Ersan Kartal (TUR), Youssouf Maiga (MLI)

9 August 2014
14:15

Boxscore

Italy	51–58	Puerto Rico
Scoring by quarter: 13–13, 14–14, 10–17, 14–14
Pts: Tote 16; Rebs: Nwohuocha 7 Asts: four players 2		Pts: Toro 20; Rebs: Toro 14; Asts: three players 1

Al-Wasl Arena, Dubai
Referees: Sinisa Herceg (CRO), Timothy Brown (NZL), Eduardo Albano (BRA)

9 August 2014
21:00

Boxscore

Spain	138–27	United Arab Emirates
Scoring by quarter: 31–17, 28–5, 39–4, 40–1
Pts: Amo 23; Rebs: Amo 12; Asts: Turbica 9		Pts: Juma 11; Rebs: four players 3 Asts: three players 1

Al-Wasl Arena, Dubai
Referees: Aare Halliko (EST), Harja Jaladri (INA), Ricardo Hayles (JAM)

11 August 2014
18:45

Boxscore

Italy	64–50	Spain
Scoring by quarter: 22–22, 11–11, 19–10, 12–7
Pts: La Torre 18; Rebs: La Torre 7 Asts: Moretti 3		Pts: Yusta 15; Rebs: Turbica, García 4 Asts: Turbica 2

Al-Wasl Arena, Dubai
Referees: Damit Javor (SLO), Julio Anaya (PAN), Jonathan Sterling (USA)

11 August 2014
21:00

Boxscore

Puerto Rico	110–53	United Arab Emirates
Scoring by quarter: 27–15, 28–16, 32–9, 23–13
Pts: Ebube 20; Rebs: Toro 17; Asts: Moya 6		Pts: Mohammad 21; Rebs: Saad 5 Asts: Juma 3

Al-Ahli Arena, Dubai
Referees: Tomasz Trawicki (POL), Hatim Al-Harbi (KSA), Mohammed El-Menshawy (EGY)

=== Group D ===
Team	Pld	W	L	PF	PA	PD	Pts
Serbia	3	3	0	221	188	+33	6
Argentina	3	2	1	206	169	+37	5
China	3	1	2	222	213	+9	4
Egypt	3	0	3	160	239	−79	3

8 August 2014
15:45

Boxscore

Serbia	80–68	China
Scoring by quarter: 23–11, 20–22, 11–20 , 26–15
Pts: Rakićević 17; Rebs: Kenić 9 Asts: Peno 5		Pts: Fu Hao 19; Rebs: Hu Jinqiu 12; Asts: Fu Hao 5

Al-Wasl Arena, Dubai
Referees: Jonathan Sterling (USA), Saverio Lanzarini (ITA), Zhoobin Jalili (IRN)

8 August 2014
21:00

Boxscore

Argentina	74–39	Egypt
Scoring by quarter: 22–10, 6–9, 28–8, 18–12
Pts: Fjellerup 22; Rebs: Fjellerup 11; Asts: Aliende 5		Pts: Farag, El-Safwany 7 Rebs: Khalaf 6 Asts: four players 1

Al-Wasl Arena, Dubai
Referees: Ilya Putenko (RUS), Americo Rodríguez (VEN), Hatim Al-Harbi (KSA)

9 August 2014
18:45

Boxscore

Egypt	63–81	Serbia
Scoring by quarter: 17–25, 13–20, 20–15, 13–21
Pts: Metwaly 16; Rebs: Bakr, El-Safwany 5 Asts: Saadelin 3		Pts: Rakićević 14; Rebs: Miladinović 13; Asts: Peno 5

Al-Ahli Arena, Dubai
Referees: Carlos Cortes (ESP), Jesed Díaz (PUR), Julio Anaya (PAN)

9 August 2014
21:00

Boxscore

China	70–75	Argentina
Scoring by quarter: 20–14, 20–21, 8–20, 22–20
Pts: Zhao Yanhao 31; Rebs: Hu Jinqiu 16; Asts: Liu Chunqing 5		Pts: Fjellerup 22; Rebs: Fjellerup, L. Delfino 6 Asts: Aliende 5

Al-Ahli Arena, Dubai
Referees: Damir Javor (SLO), Tomasz Trawicki (POL), Youssouf Maiga (MLI)

11 August 2014
14:15

Boxscore

China	84–56	Egypt
Scoring by quarter: 21–11, 30–8, 13–23, 20–16
Pts: Hu Jinqiu, Fu Hao 18; Rebs: Hu Jinqiu 16; Asts: Xu Mingzhi 4		Pts: Farag, El-Safwany 11; Rebs: Bakr 5 Asts: Mohamed, Metwaly 2

Al-Ahli Arena, Dubai
Referees: Sinisa Herceg (CRO), Harja Jaladri (INA), Jurgis Laurinavicius (LTU)

11 August 2014
21:00

Boxscore

Argentina	57–60	Serbia
Scoring by quarter: 14–14, 12–12, 14–16, 17–18
Pts: Fjellerup 15; Rebs: Fjellerup 7 Asts: Aliende 3		Pts: Kenić 18; Rebs: Stojanović 10; Asts: Peno, Stojanović 2

Al-Wasl Arena, Dubai
Referees: Ersan Kartal (TUR), Timothy Brown (NZL), Eduardo Albano (BRA)

== Final round ==
Round of 16
A1	United States	122
B4	Japan	38
C2	Italy	67
D3	China	79
A3	Angola	59
B2	Canada	106
C4	United Arab Emirates	31
D1	Serbia	116
A2	Greece	76
B3	Australia	84
C1	Puerto Rico (OT)	86
D4	Egypt	79
A4	Philippines	57
B1	France	86
C3	Spain	64
D2	Argentina	57

Quarterfinals
A1	United States	113
D3	China	71
B2	Canada	64
D1	Serbia	71
B3	Australia	76
C1	Puerto Rico	52
B1	France	67
C3	Spain	71

Semifinals
A1	United States	89
D1	Serbia	68
B3	Australia (OT)	80
C3	Spain	74

Final
A1	United States	99
B3	Australia	92
Third place
D1	Serbia	62
C3	Spain	59

=== Round of 16 ===
12 August 2014
14:15

Boxscore

United States	122–38	Japan
Scoring by quarter: 41–6, 34–11, 27–14, 20–7
Pts: Tatum 19; Rebs: Stone 11; Asts: Newman 6		Pts: Hachimura 25; Rebs: Hiraiwa 7 Asts: Hayashi 2

Al-Ahli Arena, Dubai
Referees: Saverio Lanzarini (ITA), Ricardo Hayles (JAM), Zhoobin Jalili (IRN)

12 August 2014
14:15

Boxscore

Angola	59–106	Canada
Scoring by quarter: 19–25, 7–31, 12–24, 21–26
Pts: De Sousa 14; Rebs: De Sousa 14; Asts: Manuel 3		Pts: McEwan 23; Rebs: Young 10; Asts: Murray 3

Al-Wasl Arena, Dubai
Referees: Petri Mäntylä (FIN), Tomasz Trawicki (POL), Timothy Brown (NZL)

12 August 2014
16:30

Boxscore

Philippines	57–86	France
Scoring by quarter: 17–20, 18–21, 12–20, 10–25
Pts: M. Nieto 12; Rebs: M. Nieto 10; Asts: M. Nieto 4		Pts: Noua 21; Rebs: Gombauld 20; Asts: Loubaki 5

Al-Ahli Arena, Dubai
Referees: Jurgis Laurinavicius (LTU), Hatim Al-Harbi (KSA), Harja Jaladri (INA)

12 August 2014
16:30

Boxscore

Italy	67–79	China
Scoring by quarter: 8–27, 17–16, 22–18, 20–18
Pts: La Torre 17; Rebs: Pecchia 4 Asts: Bucarelli 2		Pts: Zhao Yanhao 32; Rebs: Hu Jinqiu 17; Asts: Liu Chunqing 2

Al-Wasl Arena, Dubai
Referees: Carlos Cortes (ESP), Eduardo Albano (BRA), Julio Anaya (PAN)

12 August 2014
18:45

Boxscore

Puerto Rico	86–79 (OT)	Egypt
Scoring by quarter: 20–17, 29–20, 12–22, 10–12, Overtime: 15–8
Pts: Gandia 29; Rebs: Toro 13; Asts: Moya, Toro 3		Pts: Abdelrahman 16; Rebs: Khalaf 10; Asts: Mohamed 8

Al-Ahli Arena, Dubai
Referees: Ilya Putenko (RUS), Ersan Kartal (TUR), Youssouf Maiga (MLI)

12 August 2014
18:45

Boxscore

United Arab Emirates	31–116	Serbia
Scoring by quarter: 9–28, 3–24, 6–32, 13–32
Pts: Juma 12; Rebs: Mohammad 4 Asts: Suwais 2		Pts: Popović 26; Rebs: Popović 14; Asts: Jovanović 6

Al-Wasl Arena, Dubai
Referees: Americo Rodríguez (VEN), Chung Yi-chih (TPE), Mohamed El-Menshawy (EGY)

12 August 2014
21:00

Boxscore

Greece	76–84	Australia
Scoring by quarter: 19–19, 17–18, 16–29, 24–18
Pts: Koniaris 21; Rebs: Charalampopoulos 7 Asts: Charalampopoulos 4		Pts: Humphries 20; Rebs: Humphries 16; Asts: Owies 2

Al-Ahli Arena, Dubai
Referees: Fabricio Vito (ARG), Damir Javor (SLO), Jonathan Sterling (USA)

12 August 2014
21:00

Boxscore

Spain	64–57	Argentina
Scoring by quarter: 11–12, 13–8, 19–17, 21–20
Pts: Yusta 18; Rebs: López-Arostegui 9 Asts: García 4		Pts: Delfino 18; Rebs: Aliende 8 Asts: Fjellerup 8

Al-Wasl Arena, Dubai
Referees: Sinisa Herceg (CRO), Aare Halliko (EST), Jesed Díaz (PUR)

=== 9th–16th place classification playoffs ===
13th place game
B4	Japan	53
D4	Egypt	68
15th place game
C4	United Arab Emirates	51
A4	Philippines	115

13th-16th place semifinals
B4	Japan	91
C4	United Arab Emirates	49
D4	Egypt	92
A4	Philippines	67

9th-16th place quarterfinals
B4	Japan	56
C2	Italy	83
A3	Angola	89
C4	United Arab Emirates	47
A2	Greece	67
D4	Egypt	50
A4	Philippines	71
D2	Argentina	84

9th-12th place semifinals
C2	Italy	77
A3	Angola	71
A2	Greece	54
D2	Argentina	65

9th place game
C2	Italy	66
D2	Argentina	62
11th place game
A3	Angola	59
A2	Greece	51

==== 9th–16th place quarterfinals ====
14 August 2014
12:00

Boxscore

Japan	56–83	Italy
Scoring by quarter: 8–20, 14–21, 10–30, 24–12
Pts: Hachimura 35; Rebs: Hachimura 6 Asts: Muto, Igarashi 4		Pts: La Torre 17; Rebs: Nwohuocha 8 Asts: Moretti 5

Al-Wasl Arena, Dubai
Referees: Tomasz Trawicki (POL), Jesed Díaz (PUR), Harja Jaladri (INA)

14 August 2014
14:15

Boxscore

Angola	89–47	United Arab Emirates
Scoring by quarter: 21–17, 24–6, 17–8, 27–16
Pts: Amandio 24; Rebs: Manuel 12; Asts: Miranda 4		Pts: Mohammad 17; Rebs: Al-Abdulla, Saad 6 Asts: Mohammad 2

Al-Wasl Arena, Dubai
Referees: Carlos Cortes (ESP), Chung Yi-chih (TPE), Ricardo Hayles (JAM)

14 August 2014
16:30

Boxscore

Philippines	71–84	Argentina
Scoring by quarter: 14–22, 13–13, 19–27, 25–22
Pts: Go 27; Rebs: M. Nieto 8 Asts: M. Nieto 4		Pts: A. Delfino 20; Rebs: L. Delfino 8 Asts: three players 2

Al-Wasl Arena, Dubai
Referees: Jonathan Sterling (USA), Timothy Brown (NZL), Mohamed El-Menshawy (EGY)

14 August 2014
18:45

Boxscore

Greece	67–50	Egypt
Scoring by quarter: 26–6, 8–14, 17–8, 16–22
Pts: Pefanis 16; Rebs: Papagiannis 10; Asts: Flionis 6		Pts: El-Safwany 16; Rebs: Khalaf 10; Asts: Abdelrahman 3

Al-Wasl Arena, Dubai
Referees: Petri Mäntylä (FIN), Youssouf Maiga (MLI), Zhoobin Jalili (IRN)

==== 13th–16th place semifinals ====
15 August 2014
14:15

Boxscore

Japan	91–49	United Arab Emirates
Scoring by quarter: 23–16, 23–9, 27–13, 18–11
Pts: Maki 24; Rebs: Maeta 8 Asts: Hayashi 5		Pts: Mohammad 16; Rebs: Mohammad 5 Asts: Suwais 1

Al-Wasl Arena, Dubai
Referees: Ilya Putenko (RUS), Youssouf Maiga (MLI), Hatim Al-Harbi (KSA)

15 August 2014
16:30

Boxscore

Egypt	92–67	Philippines
Scoring by quarter: 32–19, 17–13, 17–14, 26–21
Pts: Metwaly 24; Rebs: Metwaly 12; Asts: Hussein 5		Pts: M. Nieto 20; Rebs: M. Nieto 6 Asts: M. Nieto, Desiderio 3

Al-Wasl Arena, Dubai
Referees: Fabricio Vito (ARG), Ricardo Hayles (JAM), Eduardo Albano (BRA)

==== 9th–12th place semifinals ====
15 August 2014
12:00

Boxscore

Italy	77–71	Angola
Scoring by quarter: 11–19, 22–15, 24–25, 20–12
Pts: Moretti 23; Rebs: Pecchia 8 Asts: four players 3		Pts: Amandio 26; Rebs: Fernandes 16; Asts: Amandio 4

Al-Wasl Arena, Dubai
Referees: Jonathan Sterling (USA), Ersan Kartal (TUR), Mohamed El-Menshawy (EGY)

15 August 2014
18:45

Boxscore

Greece	54–65	Argentina
Scoring by quarter: 15–6, 10–22, 7–18, 22–19
Pts: Charalampopoulos 13; Rebs: Charalampopoulos 7 Asts: Koniaris, Milentigievits 2		Pts: Fjellerup 14; Rebs: Fjellerup, Galardo 10; Asts: four players 2

Al-Wasl Arena, Dubai
Referees: Carlos Cortes (ESP), Chung Yi-chih (TPE), Jesed Díaz (PUR)

==== 15th place game ====
16 August 2014
16:30

Boxscore

United Arab Emirates	51–115	Philippines
Scoring by quarter: 15–26, 11–23, 7 –40, 18–26
Pts: Suwais 12; Rebs: Al-Abdulla, Al-Zarooni 6		Pts: Desiderio 25; Rebs: Padilla 12; Asts: Desiderio 5

Al-Wasl Arena, Dubai
Referees: Jesed Díaz (PUR), Harja Jaladri (INA), Zhoobin Jalili (IRN)

==== 13th place game ====
16 August 2014
09:45

Boxscore

Japan	53–68	Egypt
Scoring by quarter: 11–16, 9–22, 18–17, 15–13
Pts: Hachimura 22; Rebs: Maki 8 Asts: Hayashi, Nomi 3		Pts: Khalaf 15; Rebs: Khalaf 19; Asts: three players 1

Al-Wasl Arena, Dubai
Referees: Ersan Kartal (TUR), Chung Yi-chih (TPE), Mohamed Al-Hammadi (UAE)

==== Eleventh place game ====
16 August 2014
12:00

Boxscore

Angola	59–51	Greece
Scoring by quarter: 16–8, 9–18, 19–10, 15–15
Pts: De Sousa 14; Rebs: De Sousa, Jungo 10; Asts: Do 3		Pts: Pefanis, Mouratos 11; Rebs: Mouratos 6 Asts: Pefanis 4

Al-Wasl Arena, Dubai
Referees: Tomasz Trawicki (POL), Americo Rodríguez (VEN), Ricardo Hayles (JAM)

==== Ninth place game ====
16 August 2014
14:15

Boxscore

Italy	66–62	Argentina
Scoring by quarter: 14–13, 13–9, 16–23, 23–17
Pts: Moretti 16; Rebs: Nwohuocha 8 Asts: Costa 3		Pts: Carvalho, Aliende 16; Rebs: Onetto 9 Asts: Aliende 3

Al-Wasl Arena, Dubai
Referees: Petri Mäntylä (FIN), Mohamed El-Menshawy (EGY), Julio Anaya (PAN)

=== Quarterfinals ===
14 August 2014
14:15

Boxscore

United States	113–71	China
Scoring by quarter: 30–11, 21–14, 34–18, 28–28
Pts: Ellenson 21; Rebs: Ellenson 10; Asts: Newman 5		Pts: Fu Hao 16; Rebs: Fu Hao, Hu Jinqiu 7 Asts: He Xining 5

Hamdan Sports Complex, Dubai
Referees: Sinisa Herceg (CRO), Americo Rodríguez (VEN), Hatim Al-Harbi (KSA)

14 August 2014
16:30

Boxscore

Canada	64–71	Serbia
Scoring by quarter: 16–27, 24–20, 15–5, 9–19
Pts: Murray 24; Rebs: Murray 8 Asts: Murray 3		Pts: Marinković 18; Rebs: Stojanović, Miladinović 8 Asts: Peno 6

Hamdan Sports Complex, Dubai
Referees: Fabricio Vito (ARG), Aare Halliko (EST), Ilya Putenko (RUS)

14 August 2014
18:45

Boxscore

Australia	76–52	Puerto Rico
Scoring by quarter: 23–12, 18–14, 16–18, 19–8
Pts: Vasiljevic 21; Rebs: Vasiljevic 13; Asts: Hodgson 3		Pts: Toro 18; Rebs: Toro 9 Asts: four players 1

Hamdan Sports Complex, Dubai
Referees: Jurgis Laurinavicius (LTU), Saverio Lanzarini (ITA), Julio Freile (PAN)

14 August 2014
21:00

Boxscore

France	67–71	Spain
Scoring by quarter: 22–17, 11–23, 14–18, 20–13
Pts: Gombauld 21; Rebs: Gombauld 11; Asts: Noua 3		Pts: García 20; Rebs: Sorolla 6 Asts: three players 3

Hamdan Sports Complex, Dubai
Referees: Damir Javor (SLO), Ersan Kartal (TUR), Eduardo Albano (BRA)

=== 5–8th place playoffs ===
Semifinals
15 August
China	81
Canada	92
15 August
Puerto Rico	70
France	63

Fifth place
16 August
Canada	63
Puerto Rico	65
Seventh place
16 August
China	87
France	79

==== 5–8th place semifinals ====
15 August 2014
14:15

Boxscore

China	81–92	Canada
Scoring by quarter: 21–20, 20–28, 17–20, 23–24
Pts: Zhao Yanhao 25; Rebs: Hu Jinqiu 10; Asts: Liu Chunqing 5		Pts: Ekiyor 21; Rebs: Ekiyor 9 Asts: Murray 5

Hamdan Sports Complex, Dubai
Referees: Damir Javor (SLO), Americo Rodríguez (VEN), Harja Jaladri (INA)

15 August 2014
16:30

Boxscore

Puerto Rico	70–63	France
Scoring by quarter: 16–17, 13–16, 16–15, 25–15
Pts: Toro 21; Rebs: Toro 18; Asts: Gandia 4		Pts: Gombauld 17; Rebs: Gombauld 11; Asts: Labanére 2

Hamdan Sports Complex, Dubai
Referees: Sinisa Herceg (CRO), Saverio Lanzarini (ITA), Zhoobin Jalili (IRN)

==== Seventh place game ====
16 August 2014
14:15

Boxscore

China	87–79	France
Scoring by quarter: 25–26, 25–15, 17–21, 20–17
Pts: Zhao Yanhao 25; Rebs: Hu Jinqiu 8 Asts: He Xining, Liu Chunqing 8		Pts: Noua 32; Rebs: Noua 9 Asts: Jeanne, Hergott 3

Hamdan Sports Complex, Dubai
Referees: Aare Halliko (EST), Youssouf Maiga (MLI), Ilya Putenko (RUS)

==== Fifth place game ====
16 August 2014
16:30

Boxscore

Canada	63–65	Puerto Rico
Scoring by quarter: 17–11, 16–14, 16–22, 14–18
Pts: Murray 17; Rebs: Ekiyor 10; Asts: Cyrus, Murray 2		Pts: Allende 16; Rebs: Toro 12; Asts: Gandia 3

Hamdan Sports Complex, Dubai
Referees: Sinisa Herceg (CRO), Timothy Brown (NZL), Hatim Al-Harbi (KSA)

=== Championship ===
==== Semifinals ====
15 August 2014
18:45

Boxscore

United States	89–68	Serbia
Scoring by quarter: 24–16, 15–20, 20–12, 30–20
Pts: Newman 15; Rebs: Giles 12; Asts: Ferguson 4		Pts: Rakićević 19; Rebs: Aranitović 8 Asts: Peno 4

Hamdan Sports Complex, Dubai
Referees: Petri Mäntylä (FIN), Tomasz Trawicki (POL), Timothy Brown (NZL)

15 August 2014
21:00

Boxscore

Australia	80–74 (OT)	Spain
Scoring by quarter: 11–21, 21–22, 17–12, 18–12, Overtime: 13–7
Pts: Humphries 22; Rebs: Wilson 11; Asts: Owies 7		Pts: Sorolla 15; Rebs: Rodríguez 10; Asts: Pérez 3

Hamdan Sports Complex, Dubai
Referees: Jurgis Laurinavicius (LTU), Aare Halliko (EST), Julio Anaya (PAN)

==== Third place game ====
16 August 2014
18:45

Boxscore

Serbia	62–59	Spain
Scoring by quarter: 13–15, 9–13, 21–16, 19–15
Pts: Rakićević 17; Rebs: Bojanić, Aranitović 8 Asts: Stojanović 3		Pts: Vilá 20; Rebs: Vilá 10; Asts: Pérez 3

Hamdan Sports Complex, Dubai
Referees: Fabricio Vito (ARG), Saverio Lanzarini (ITA), Jonathan Sterling (USA)

==== Final ====
16 August 2014
21:00

Boxscore

United States	99–92	Australia
Scoring by quarter: 28–27, 22–16, 24–21, 25–28
Pts: Newman 21; Rebs: Newman 11; Asts: Newman 3		Pts: Vasiljevic 29; Rebs: Wilson, Humphries 6 Asts: Wilson 7

Hamdan Sports Complex, Dubai
Referees: Damir Javor (SLO), Carlos Cortes (ESP), Eduardo Albano (BRA)

== Final standings ==
Rank	Team	Record
1st place, gold medalist(s)	United States	7–0
2nd place, silver medalist(s)	Australia	5–2
3rd place, bronze medalist(s)	Serbia	6–1
4th	Spain	3–4
5th	Puerto Rico	6–1
6th	Canada	4–3
7th	China	3–4
8th	France	4–3
9th	Italy	5–2
10th	Argentina	4–3
11th	Angola	3–4
12th	Greece	3–4
13th	Egypt	2–5
14th	Japan	1–6
15th	Philippines	1–6
16th	United Arab Emirates	0–7

== Awards ==
2014 Under-17 World Championship winner

United States
Third title

Most Valuable Player
(United States) Malik Newman

All-Tournament Team

- (United States) Malik Newman
- (Australia) Dejan Vasiljevic
- (Serbia) Nikola Rakićević
- (Australia) Isaac Humphries
- (United States) Diamond Stone

== Statistical leaders ==
Points

Name	PPG
(Japan) Rui Hachimura	22.6
(China) Zhao Yanhao	21.6
(Australia) Isaac Humphries	18.9
(France) Amine Noua	18.7
(China) Hu Jinqiu	17.4
(Australia) Dejan Vasiljevic	17.4

Rebounds

Name	RPG
(Puerto Rico) Arnaldo Toro	13.6
(China) Hu Jinqiu	12.3
(Australia) Isaac Humphries	11.6
(Angola) Bruno Fernandes	10.6
(France) Stéphane Gombauld	10.3

Assists

Name	APG
(Serbia) Stefan Peno	3.4
(China) Liu Chunqing	3.3
(Australia) Matthew Owies	3.1
(Argentina) Guillermo Aliende	3.0
(United States) Malik Newman	3.0

Blocks

Name	BPG
(Egypt) Ahmed Khalaf	4.9
(Australia) Isaac Humphries	3.3
(United States) Diamond Stone	3.3
(Angola) Bruno Fernandes	2.7
(Japan) Rui Hachimura	1.7
(Spain) Ramón Vilá	1.7

Steals

Name	SPG
(China) Zhao Yanhao	3.3
(Egypt) Ahmed Metwaly	3.0
(Egypt) Mohamed Mohamed	2.4
(United States) Harry Giles	2.3
(Angola) Silvio De Sousa	2.1
(Argentina) Maximo Fjellerup	2.1
(Italy) Andrea Pecchia	2.1
