= Nikola Rakićević =

Serbian basketball player

Personal information
- Born: January 14, 1997 (age 29) Smederevska Palanka, FR Yugoslavia
- Listed height: 6 ft 5 in (1.96 m)
- Listed weight: 185 lb (84 kg)

Career information
- College: Buffalo (2015–2017)
- NBA draft: 2019: undrafted
- Position: Shooting guard / small forward

Career highlights
- MAC champion (2016); Euroleague IJT champion (2014)
Medals
Men's basketball
Representing Serbia
FIBA Under-17 Basketball World Cup
Bronze medal – third place	2014 UAE	U17 Team
FIBA Europe Under-16 Championship
Silver medal – second place	2013 Ukraine	U16 Team

Nikola Rakićević (Serbian Cyrillic: Никола Ракићевић; born January 14, 1997) is a Serbian professional basketball player. He played college basketball for the Buffalo Bulls.

== Early life ==
Rakićević played basketball for the youth teams of Crvena zvezda from 2012 to 2015. He was a member of the Crvena zvezda U18 team that won the 2014 Euroleague Next Generation tournament. In February 2015, Rakićević participated at the NBA All-Star Basketball Without Borders Global Camp in New York City, NY.

== College career ==
As a freshman, Rakićević appeared in 20 games at the State University of New York at Buffalo in their 2015–16 season. On November 13, 2015, he recorded a career-best seven rebounds in the season opener against Pitt-Bradford. On December 29, he scored a career-high 14 points and added five rebounds against Delaware.

As a sophomore, Rakićević appeared in 21 games in the Bulls' 2016–17 season before missing the final three games and the conference tournament due to a season-ending injury. He made three starts on the year and tied his career high with 14 points at Kent State as he went 6-of-11 from the floor. He had eight points against Ohio and scored four points in seven of his 21 games. He averaged 2.6 points and 1.3 rebounds per game.

Rakićević wasn't in the Bulls rosters for the 2017–18 season. His departure was on medical grounds, primarily with his knee issues. Also, Rakićević was ruled out for the entire 2018–19 season, his senior year.

== International career ==
Rakićević was a member of the Serbian U-16 national basketball team that won the silver medal at the 2013 FIBA Europe Under-16 Championship in Ukraine. Over seven tournament games, he averaged 6 points, 3.3 rebounds and 0.6 assists per game. Also, he was a member of the Serbian U-17 national team that won the bronze medal at the 2014 FIBA Under-17 World Championship in Dubai, UAE. Over seven tournament games, he averaged 12.4 points, 5.7 rebounds and 0.6 assists per game. At the tournament's end, he was named to the All-Tournament Team.

== Career achievements and awards ==
=== Youth level ===
- Euroleague Next Generation tournament champion: 2014
- Euroleague Next Generation Tournament runner-up: 2015

=== College ===
- Mid-American Conference champion: 2016

Individual

- Mid-American Conference All-Academic First team: 2016–17

=== Serbian national team ===
Individual

- 2014 FIBA Under-17 World Championship: All-Tournament Team

== Personal life ==
Rakićević is born in Smederevska Palanka, Serbia, FR Yugoslavia, to Saša and Jasmina. He has one sister.

Rakićević earned his bachelor's degree in business administration from the University at Buffalo in 2019. He was a business office student assistant at the University at Buffalo School of Management from August 2017 until his graduation.
