= Máximo Fjellerup =

Argentine basketball player

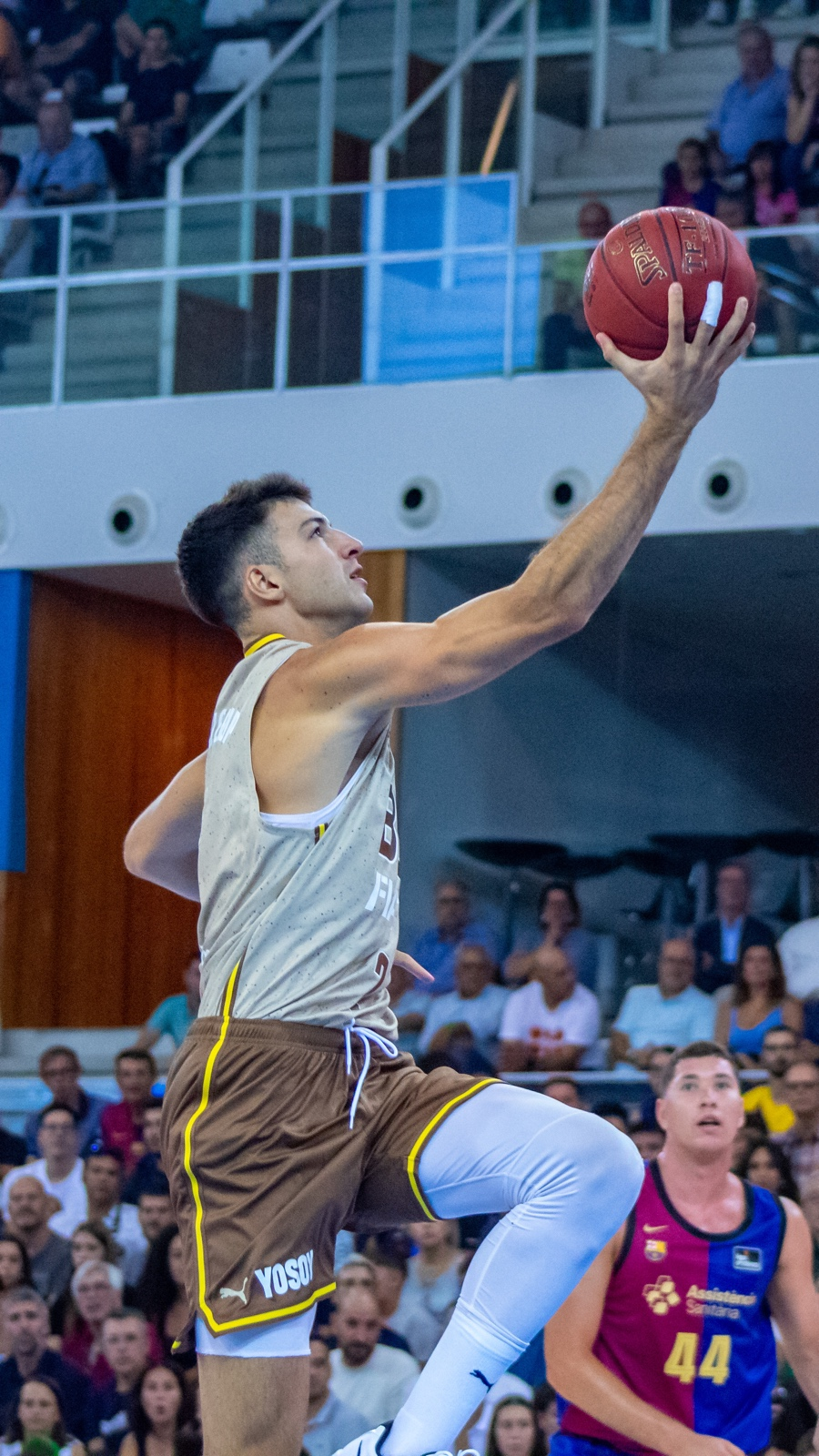
- Fjellerup with Bàsquet Girona in 2024

No. 2 – Bàsquet Girona
- Position: Shooting guard / small forward
- League: Liga ACB

Personal information
- Born: November 25, 1997 (age 28) Tres Arroyos, Argentina
- Listed height: 6 ft 6 in (1.98 m)
- Listed weight: 200 lb (91 kg)

Career information
- NBA draft: 2019: undrafted
- Playing career: 2014–present

Career history
- 2014–2018: Bahía Basket
- 2018–2021: San Lorenzo
- 2021: Palma
- 2022–present: Bàsquet Girona
Medals
Men's basketball
Representing Argentina
World Cup
Silver medal – second place	2019 China
FIBA AmeriCup
Gold medal – first place	2022 Brazil
Silver medal – second place	2017 Argentina
Pan American Games
Gold medal – first place	2019 Lima	Team

Máximo Hugo Fjellerup (born November 25, 1997) is an Argentine professional basketball player for Spanish club Bàsquet Girona of Liga ACB. At a height of 1.98 metres (6 feet 6 inches) tall, he plays at the shooting guard and small forward positions.

== Professional career ==
In his pro career, Fjellerup has played in both the 2nd-tier South American League, and the 1st-tier FIBA Americas League.

== National team career ==
Fjellerup has been a member of the senior Argentine national team. With Argentina, he played at the 2017 FIBA AmeriCup, where he won a silver medal. In 2019, he took part in the team that won the Pan American gold medal in Lima. He was included in the Argentine squad for the 2019 FIBA Basketball World Cup and clinched silver medal with Argentina which emerged as runners-up to Spain at the 2019 FIBA Basketball World Cup.

In 2022, Fjellerup won the gold medal in the 2022 FIBA AmeriCup held in Recife, Brazil. He did not play for many minutes, but was one of the Argentine squad's shooting guards in the tournament.
