= Amine Noua =

French basketball player (born 1997)

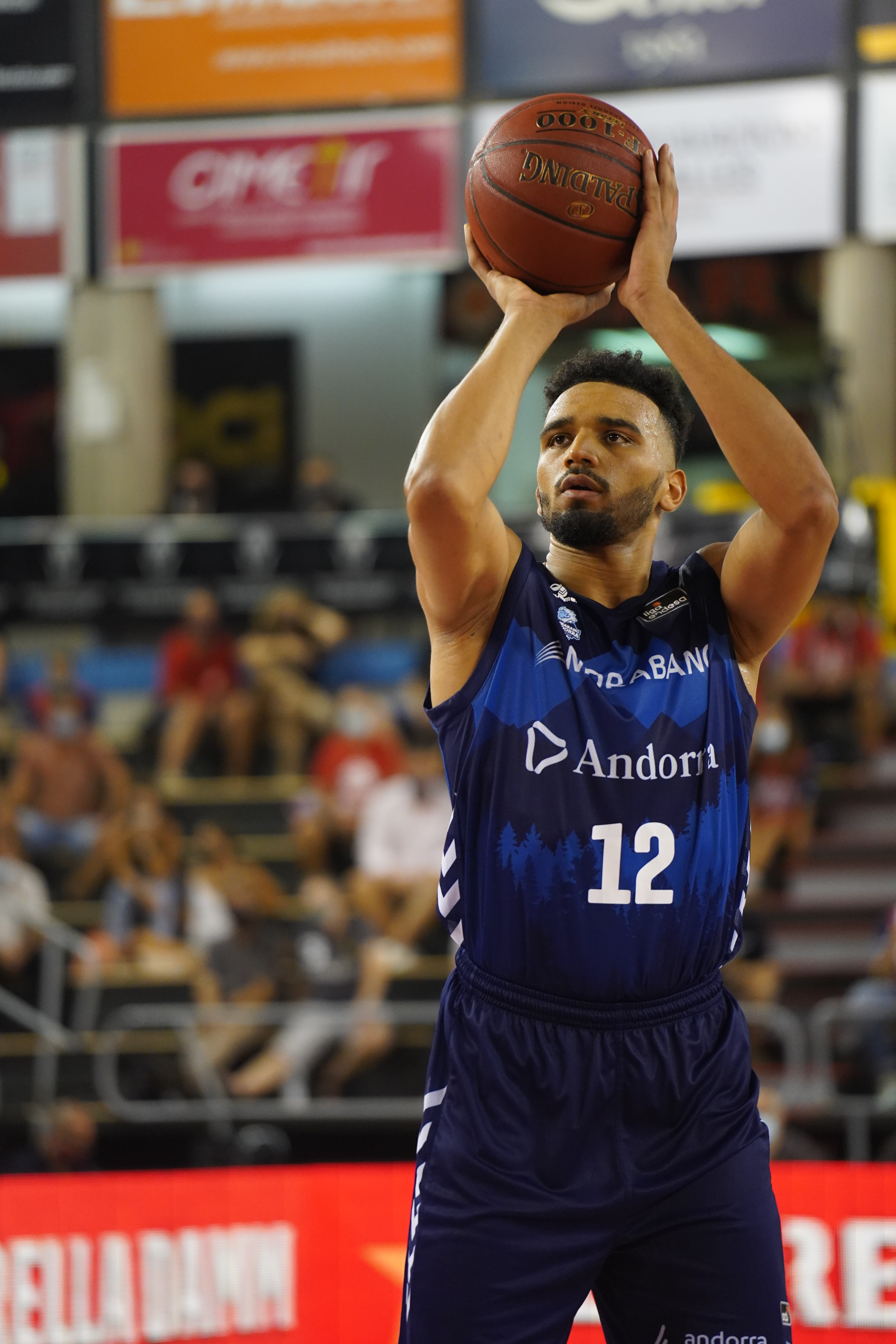
- Noua with Andorra in 2021

No. 17 – Unicaja Málaga
- Position: Power forward
- League: Liga ACB; BCL

Personal information
- Born: February 7, 1997 (age 29) Lyon, France
- Listed height: 2.02 m (6 ft 8 in)
- Listed weight: 91 kg (201 lb)

Career information
- NBA draft: 2019: undrafted
- Playing career: 2015–present

Career history
- 2015–2021: ASVEL
- 2021–2022: Andorra
- 2022: SIG Strasbourg
- 2022–2023: ASVEL
- 2023: Hapoel Holon
- 2023–2024: Derthona
- 2024: Fenerbahçe
- 2024–2025: Granada
- 2025: Satria Muda Pertamina
- 2025–2026: Aris Thessaloniki
- 2026–present: Unicaja Málaga

Career highlights
- 3x LNB Élite champion (2016, 2019, 2021); 2x French Cup winner (2019, 2021); Turkish Super League champion (2024); Turkish Cup winner (2024)
Medals
Representing France
Men's basketball
FIBA Europe Under-20
Bronze medal – third place	2017 Greece	National Team

Amine Noua (born February 7, 1997) is a French professional basketball player for Unicaja Málaga of the Liga ACB and the Basketball Champions League (BCL). Standing at 2.02 m (6 ft 8 in), he plays at the power forward position.

== Professional career ==
Noua was born in Lyon and cut his teeth in the youth ranks of ASVEL Basket. After playing in the club's under-21 team, he made his first-team debut in January 2016, scoring two points in five minutes against Champagne Châlons-Reims Basket. During ASVEL's championship run that year, he averaged 0.8 points and 0.8 rebounds in 3.8 minutes per contest.

In April 2018, he declared for the 2018 NBA draft. However, he withdrew before the deadline. His breakout season came in 2017–18, when he averaged 11 points and 4.7 rebounds a game in 32 ProA contests (including 26 starts). He also attended the French All Star Game that season.

On July 7, 2021, he has signed with MoraBanc Andorra of the Liga ACB.

On April 11, 2022, he has signed with SIG Strasbourg of the French LNB Pro A. He returned to ASVEL on July 7, 2022.

On August 1, 2023, he signed with Hapoel Holon of the Israeli Basketball Premier League.

On December 2, 2023, he signed with Derthona Basket of the Italian LBA.

On January 22, 2024, he signed a one-month contract with Fenerbahçe Beko of the Turkish Basketbol Süper Ligi (BSL). On February 19, 2024, Fenerbahçe Beko extend his contract to end of the 2023–24 season. On July 9, 2024, Noua parted ways with the Turkish club.

On July 31, 2024, he signed with Covirán Granada of the Liga ACB.

After playing the previous season for Aris Thessaloniki, Noua signed with Unicaja of the Liga ACB and the Basketball Champions League on July 30, 2026.

== Career statistics ==
Legend
GP	Games played	GS	Games started	MPG	Minutes per game
FG%	Field-goal percentage	3P%	3-point field-goal percentage	FT%	Free-throw percentage
RPG	Rebounds per game	APG	Assists per game	SPG	Steals per game
BPG	Blocks per game	PPG	Points per game	PIR	Performance index rating
**Bold**	Career high

=== EuroLeague ===
Year	Team	GP	GS	MPG	FG%	3P%	FT%	RPG	APG	SPG	BPG	PPG	PIR
2019–20	ASVEL	25	6	14.1	**.625**	.326	.625	2.0	.3	.3	.2	5.0	3.2
2020–21	ASVEL	28	4	15.3	.485	.317	**.762**	2.5	**.8**	**.4**	.1	5.0	5.1
2022–23	ASVEL	**30**	**19**	**19.4**	.500	.341	.700	**3.0**	**.8**	.3	.4	**6.5**	4.9
2023–24	Fenerbahçe	12	7	14.7	.541	.375	**.800**	2.8	.5	.2	**.8**	4.2	**5.3**
Career		95	36	16.4	.443	.333	.710	2.6	.6	.3	.4	5.4	4.6

=== EuroCup ===
Year	Team	GP	GS	MPG	FG%	3P%	FT%	RPG	APG	SPG	BPG	PPG	PIR
2017–18	ASVEL	**15**	**15**	22.2	**.457**	.367	.524	**4.1**	**1.1**	.3	.6	7.9	8.2
2018–19	ASVEL	**15**	4	**25.5**	.520	**.432**	**.688**	4.0	**1.1**	**.6**	**.7**	**10.8**	**10.7**
2021–22	Andorra	13	8	19.1	.413	.273	.500	2.7	.6	.2	.6	6.0	4.4
Career		43	37	22.4	.412	.364	.581	3.7	.9	.4	.6	8.3	7.9

=== Basketball Champions League ===
Year	Team	GP	GS	MPG	FG%	3P%	FT%	RPG	APG	SPG	BPG	PPG
2016–17	ASVEL	**18**	2	16.2	**.526**	**.400**	.552	3.6	.6	.6	.3	5.4
2023–24	Hapoel Holon	4	**4**	**31.9**	.420	.333	.727	**6.7**	**1.0**	**.7**	**.7**	**14.0**
2023–24	Derthona Tortona	4	3	16.3	.067	.111	**.778**	2.5	.5	.2	**.7**	2.5
Career		26	9	18.6	.440	.281	.633	3.9	.6	.5	.5	6.3

=== FIBA Europe Cup ===
Year	Team	GP	GS	MPG	FG%	3P%	FT%	RPG	APG	SPG	BPG	PPG
2015–16	ASVEL	3	0	6.6	.250	.000	.250	.7	—	—	—	1.0
Career		3	0	6.6	.250	.000	.250	.7	—	—	—	1.0

=== Domestic leagues ===
Year	Team	League	GP	MPG	FG%	3P%	FT%	RPG	APG	SPG	BPG	PPG
2015–16	(France) ASVEL	Pro A	12	3.8	.267	—	.500	.8	—	.1	.1	0.8
2016–17	(France) ASVEL	Pro A	38	10.8	.473	.143	.450	2.7	.3	.3	.3	3.0
2017–18	(France) ASVEL	Pro A	32	23.6	.521	.330	.712	4.7	1.0	.7	.5	11.0
2018–19	(France) ASVEL	LNB Élite	41	22.0	.484	.362	.647	3.7	.9	.4	.6	9.4
2019–20	(France) ASVEL	LNB Élite	22	19.5	.513	.400	.750	3.3	.9	.4	.3	9.7
2020–21	(France) ASVEL	LNB Élite	33	20.8	.510	.429	.827	3.5	.9	.6	.5	10.9
2021–22	(Spain) Andorra	ACB	21	16.8	.442	.411	.850	2.3	.5	.2	.2	6.7
2021–22	(France) SIG Strasbourg	LNB Élite	9	25.3	.515	.400	.650	3.8	1.3	.2	.4	14.6
2022–23	(France) ASVEL	LNB Élite	35	18.5	.476	.358	.655	3.2	1.0	.3	.4	8.5
2023–24	(Italy) Derthona Tortona	LBA	6	17.5	.441	.235	.333	4.0	.5	.5	.7	6.0
2023–24	(Turkey) Fenerbahçe	TBSL	2	29.1	.650	.000	.833	6.5	2.5	.5	.5	15.5

== International career ==
Noua was part of the French national team, competing in the 2013 FIBA Europe Under-16 Championships. At the 2014 FIBA Under-17 World Championships, he poured in 18.7 points a contest, finishing fourth in the tournament in scoring en route to Eurobasket.com All-World Championships U17 3rd Team distinction. Noua averaged 15.8 points per game at the 2016 FIBA Europe under-20 Championships.

During the 2017 FIBA Europe Under-20 Championship, he averaged team-highs 12.9 points as well as 7.9 rebounds a game, helping France win the bronze medal and was named to the All-Tournament Team. In November 2017, he received his first call-up for the men's national team.

== Personal life ==
Noua is of Moroccan and Algerian descent.
