= Iakovos Milentigievits =

Greek basketball player

Iakovos Milentigievits Ιάκωβος Μιλεντίγιεβιτς
Free agent
- Position: Shooting guard / point guard

Personal information
- Born: January 11, 1997 (age 29) Maroussi, Athens, Greece
- Listed height: 6 ft 2.75 in (1.90 m)
- Listed weight: 180 lb (82 kg)

Career information
- Playing career: 2015–present

Career history
- 2015–2017: Doukas
- 2017–2018: Koroivos Amaliadas
- 2018–2019: Ionikos Nikaias
- 2019–2021: Psychiko
- 2021–2023: APAS Fanaria Naxou
- 2023–2025: Panionios
- 2025–2026: Proteas Voulas
- 2026: Psychiko

Career highlights
- Greek 2nd Division champion (2019)
Medals
Representing Greece
Men's basketball
FIBA Europe Under-20 Championship
Gold medal – first place	2017 Greece	Under-20
FIBA Europe Under-18 Championship
Gold medal – first place	2015 Greece	Under-18

Iakovos Milentigievits Alifieris (alternate spelling: Milentijević) (Greek: Ιάκωβος Μιλεντίγιεβιτς Αλιφιέρης; born January 11, 1997) is a Serbian–Greek professional basketball player who currently plays for Psychiko of the Greek Elite League. At 1.90 m (6 ft 2 3/4 in) tall, he plays at the point guard and shooting guard positions.

== Professional career ==
After playing in the Greek 4th Division, during the 2014–15 season, with Aigaleo, Milentigievits began his pro career with the Greek 2nd Division club Doukas, during the 2015–16 season. In 2017, he moved to the Greek 1st Division club Koroivos, for the 2017–18 season.

On June 14, Milentigievits joined Panionios of the Greek Elite League. On June 1, 2024, after gaining the promotion with Panionios to the Greek Basket League, he renewed his contract with the team for two more seasons.

In late 2025 the club announced that Milentigievits will leave Panionios before his contact's end. Shortly after he announced to join Proteas Voulas for one season. On June 10, 2026, Psychiko B.C. announced that he will join the team for the upcoming 2026/2027 season.

== National team career ==
Milentigievits played at the 2014 FIBA Under-17 World Cup and won gold medals at the 2015 FIBA Europe Under-18 Championship and 2017 FIBA Europe Under-20 Championship.

== Personal life ==
Milentigievits' father is a Serbian former basketball player, his mother is Greek and his younger sister Elena is a volleyball player who played with Olympiacos.
