= Isaac Humphries =

Australian basketball player (born 1998)

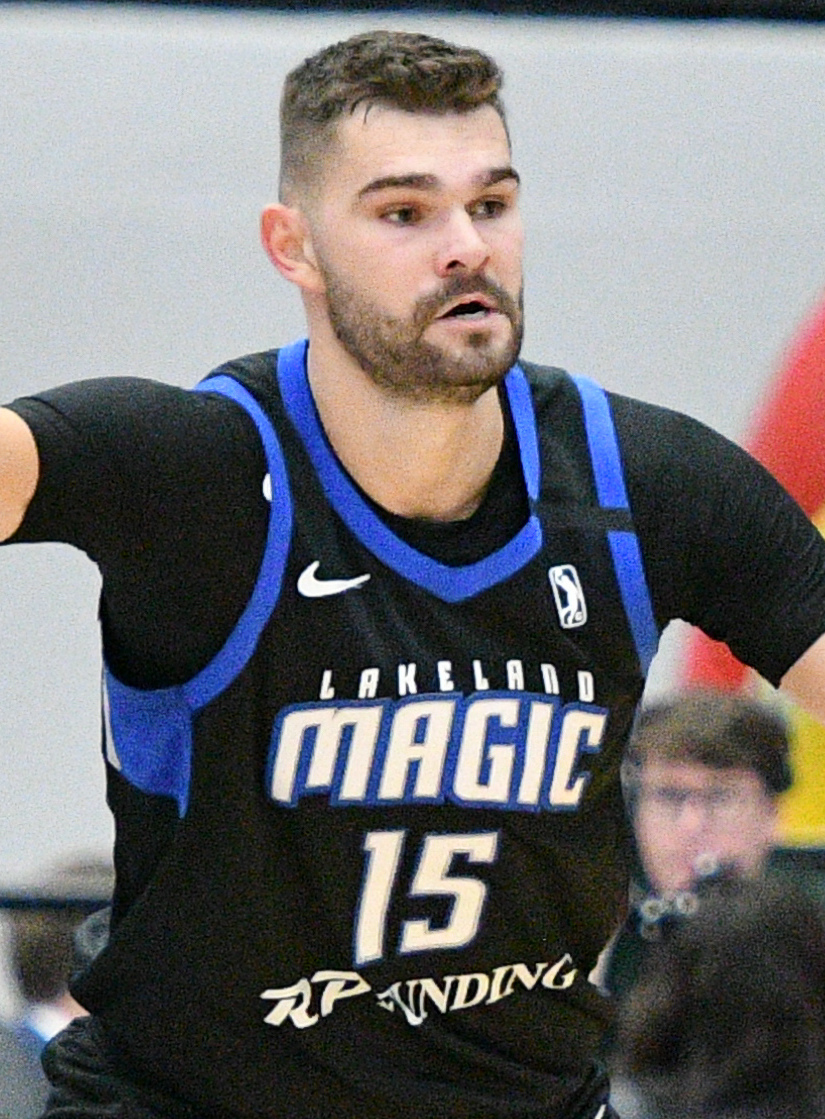
- Humphries with the Lakeland Magic in 2020

Personal information
- Born: 5 January 1998 (age 28) Sydney, New South Wales, Australia
- Listed height: 213 cm (7 ft 0 in)
- Listed weight: 112 kg (247 lb)

Career information
- High school: Scots College (Sydney, New South Wales); La Lumiere (LaPorte, Indiana)
- College: Kentucky (2015–2017)
- NBA draft: 2017: undrafted
- Playing career: 2014–2026
- Position: Center

Career history
- 2014: BA Centre of Excellence
- 2017–2018: Sydney Kings
- 2018: FMP
- 2018–2019: Erie BayHawks
- 2019: Atlanta Hawks
- 2019–2020: Lakeland Magic
- 2020–2022: Adelaide 36ers
- 2022–2023: Melbourne United
- 2023–2026: Adelaide 36ers

Career highlights
- NBL Rookie of the Year (2018)
- Stats at NBA.com
- Stats at Basketball Reference
Medals
Men's basketball
Representing Australia
FIBA Under-17 World Cup
Silver medal – second place	2014 Dubai	National team

Isaac Bradley Humphries (born 5 January 1998) is an Australian former professional basketball player. He played college basketball in the United States for the Kentucky Wildcats before making his professional debut in the National Basketball League (NBL) for the Sydney Kings in 2017. After two seasons in the NBA G League and making his NBA debut for the Atlanta Hawks in 2019, Humphries joined the Adelaide 36ers in 2020. He played two seasons for the 36ers before joining Melbourne United for a season, and then re-joining the 36ers in 2023. After three seasons for the 36ers, he retired due to injury in October 2026.

In 2022, Humphries became the first NBL player to come out as gay. He is also a singer and cabaret performer, performing at the Adelaide Fringe in 2024 and 2025.

== Early life and career ==
Isaac Bradley Humphries was born on 5 January 1998 in the Sydney suburb of Caringbah. He grew up in Cronulla, where the predominant culture was surfing and beach. He was a musical child, playing violin at four, trumpet the following year, and piano later. He was also a gifted singer, performing on stages around Sydney before he started playing basketball.

After playing rugby league for a while, Humphries started playing basketball at the age of 12. In 2010, he spent six months in Hamilton, Ontario, Canada.

Humphries attended Scots College in Sydney, where he reached 7 ft (2.1 m) in height by the time he was 16. He was later very appreciative of the support and facilities offered by the school, saying "That school changed my life. Saved my life".

In 2014, Humphries moved to Canberra to attend the Australian Institute of Sport (AIS) and play for the BA Centre of Excellence in the South East Australian Basketball League (SEABL). In nine SEABL games, he averaged 7.8 points, 7.0 rebounds and 1.2 assists per game. During his time at the AIS, he played around the world with the national under-17s team.

== College career ==
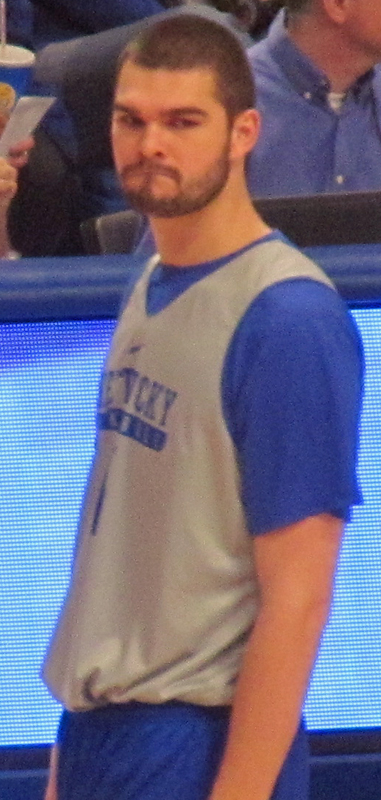
Humphries with the Kentucky Wildcats in 2016

Humphries took his game to the United States in December 2014 to play prep ball at La Lumiere School in La Porte, Indiana.

Humphries enrolled at the University of Kentucky, where he saw action in 23 games as a freshman with the Wildcats in 2015–16. Coming off the bench in all but one game, he averaged 1.9 points and 2.4 rebounds in 9.1 minutes per contest.

In the 2016–17 campaign, Humphries appeared in 38 games for the Wildcats with one start, producing averages of 2.8 points and 2.8 boards per outing in 8.3 minutes a game. He scored a career-high 12 points in his last college game, Kentucky's 75–73 loss to the North Carolina Tar Heels in the South Region finals where he was also named in the NCAA All-Regional tournament team.

In April 2017, Humphries declared for the NBA draft, forgoing his final two years of college eligibility.

== Professional career ==
=== Sydney Kings (2017–2018) ===
Opting to turn professional, Humphries worked out with several NBA franchises over the summer, including the Washington Wizards, after going undrafted in the 2017 NBA draft. Humphries returned to Australia and signed with his hometown team the Sydney Kings on 27 July 2017 for the 2017–18 NBL season. With the Kings, Humphries averaged 6.9 points, 3.6 rebounds and 1.0 blocks while shooting 58 percent in 16 minutes per game, making six starts in 26 appearances. He was subsequently named the NBL Rookie of the Year.

=== FMP (2018) ===
On 27 February 2018, Humphries agreed to a deal with FMP of the Basketball League of Serbia.

=== Erie BayHawks (2018–2019) ===
On 8 October 2018, Humphries signed a training camp deal with the Atlanta Hawks, but was waived the next day. He subsequently joined the Erie BayHawks for the 2018–19 NBA G League season.

=== Atlanta Hawks (2019) ===
On 1 April 2019, Humphries signed with Atlanta for the remainder of 2018–19 NBA season.

Humphries joined the Los Angeles Clippers for the 2019 NBA Summer League in Las Vegas.

=== Lakeland Magic (2019–2020) ===
On 24 September 2019, Humphries signed with the Orlando Magic. He was waived and assigned to the Lakeland Magic. Humphries averaged 8.8 points, 5.9 rebounds, and 1.6 blocks per game during the 2019–20 season.

=== Adelaide 36ers (2020–2022) ===
On 16 July 2020, Humphries signed a two-year deal to return to the NBL with the Adelaide 36ers. He averaged 13.3 points, 7.1 rebounds, and a league-leading 2.8 blocks per game during the 2020–21 season. His mutual option for a second season with the 36ers was not exercised.

On 9 July 2021, Humphries re-signed with the 36ers for the 2021–22 NBL season. He played just six matches, averaging 7.7 points in 17.7 minutes per game, before a knee injury ruled him out for the season in February 2022.

=== Melbourne United (2022–2023) ===
On 22 July 2022, Humphries signed with Melbourne United for the 2022–23 NBL season.

=== Return to Adelaide (2023–2026) ===
On 26 April 2023, Humphries signed with the Adelaide 36ers for the 2023–24 NBL season, returning to the franchise for a second stint. He had the most productive season of his career coinciding with his first relatively injury-free season in a number of years. Humphries played in all 28 games and averaged 15.3 points, 6.7 rebounds, and 1.3 blocks per game. He was subsequently named 36ers Club MVP.

On 7 March 2024, Humphries re-signed with the 36ers on a three-year deal.

Prior to the 2025–26 NBL season, Humphries was named co-captain of the 36ers alongside Bryce Cotton and Dejan Vasiljevic. In 2025–26, Humphries averaged 12.6 points, 5 rebounds and 1.5 blocks per game.

Due to a knee injury, Humphries missed the 2026–27 pre-season Blitz tournament and the season opener. On 1 October 2026, he was ruled out for an extended period after it was discovered that his knee injury was worse than expected. Due to the persistent knee injury, Humphries announced his retirement from the NBL on 20 October 2026.

In 173 games across eight NBL seasons, Humphries averaged 11.6 points, 5.5 rebounds, 1 assist and 1.5 blocks per game.

== National team career ==
Humphries made his debut for the Australian junior national team at the 2013 FIBA Oceania Under-16 Championship. In 2014, he helped Australia win the silver medal at the FIBA Under-17 World Championship, averaging 18.9 points, 11.6 rebounds and 3.3 blocks per game and earning All-Tournament Team honours. Humphries made his senior debut for the Australian national team in a 2019 FIBA World Cup qualifying match against Kazakhstan, where he recorded 17 points and 7 rebounds in a dominant performance.

== Career statistics ==
Legend
GP	Games played	GS	Games started	MPG	Minutes per game
FG%	Field goal percentage	3P%	3-point field goal percentage	FT%	Free throw percentage
RPG	Rebounds per game	APG	Assists per game	SPG	Steals per game
BPG	Blocks per game	PPG	Points per game	**Bold**	Career high

=== NBA ===
==== Regular season ====
Year	Team	GP	GS	MPG	FG%	3P%	FT%	RPG	APG	SPG	BPG	PPG
2018–19	Atlanta	5	1	11.2	.286	.273	–	2.2	.0	.2	.0	3.0
Career		5	1	11.2	.286	.273	–	2.2	.0	.2	.0	3.0

=== NBA G League ===
==== Regular season ====
Year	Team	GP	GS	MPG	FG%	3P%	FT%	RPG	APG	SPG	BPG	PPG
2018–19	Erie	46	34	21.8	.538	.337	.662	7.0	1.0	.8	1.0	11.3
Career		46	34	21.8	.538	.337	.662	7.0	1.0	.8	1.0	11.3

=== NBL ===
Year	Team	GP	GS	MPG	FG%	3P%	FT%	RPG	APG	SPG	BPG	PPG
2017–18	Sydney	26	6	16.5	.583	.000	.653	3.7	.8	.7	1.0	6.9
Career		26	6	16.5	.583	.000	.653	3.7	.8	.7	1.0	6.9

=== College ===
Year	Team	GP	GS	MPG	FG%	3P%	FT%	RPG	APG	SPG	BPG	PPG
2015–16	Kentucky	23	**1**	**9.1**	.390	–	**.733**	2.4	.1	.1	**.7**	1.9
2016–17	Kentucky	**38**	**1**	8.3	**.511**	–	.600	**2.8**	**.2**	**.2**	.5	**2.8**
Career		61	2	8.6	.473	–	.650	2.7	.2	.2	.6	2.4

== Music career ==
While playing basketball in the US, Humphries occasionally sang the American national anthem before basketball matches, and for charity events. He restarted his music career after some years immersed in basketball, during which time he started learning new instruments that he could play anywhere. As of 2024 he was continuing the two careers in parallel, performing as well as writing and releasing music. In that year, he was an ambassador for the Adelaide Fringe, as well as performing a show called Unearthed. It was so named because it focused on sharing personal moments and songs that helped him "unearth" who he became. The show included original songs as well as cover versions, which he sings in his tenor voice. The season sold out.

For the 2025 Adelaide Fringe, Humphries performs his show called More of Me.

== Personal life ==
On 16 November 2022, Humphries came out as gay. The announcement saw Humphries become the only active openly gay male professional basketball player in a top-tier league anywhere in the world. He also became the first ever Australian male basketball player and first player in the NBL to be openly gay. He said that he had struggled with his sexuality and contemplated suicide, but ultimately decided that he would be happier to be open about it with his teammates. He posted a video online, which was shared widely, including by Lauren Jackson, Dylan Alcott, and Andrew Gaze. By February 2023 it had garnered around 10 million views, with mostly positive responses, including messages from Tones and I and Dannii Minogue. However, although the NBA sent a message of solidarity, not a single active NBA player showed support.

Humphries has a tattoo on his arm reading "silence is loud", referring to his depression. He is a friend of Prinnie Stevens, who was also an Adelaide Fringe ambassador in 2024.

== See also ==
- List of foreign basketball players in Serbia
