= Matthew Owies =

Australian rules footballer

Personal information
- Full name: Matthew Owies
- Born: 19 March 1997 (age 29)
- Original team: Camberwell Sharks (YJFL)/St Kevin's College
- Draft: Not drafted, 2018 Category B rookie
- Height: 180 cm (5 ft 11 in)
- Weight: 81 kg (179 lb)
- Position: Forward

Club information
- Current club: West Coast
- Number: 16

Playing career^{1}
Years	Club	Games (Goals)
2019–2024	Carlton	72 (89)
2025–2026	West Coast	19 (9)
Total		91 (98)
- ^{1} Playing statistics correct to the end of the 2026 season.

Matthew John Owies (born 19 March 1997) is former Australian rules footballer and former basketball player who played for the West Coast Eagles and Carlton Blues in the Australian Football League (AFL).

== Junior Sport ==
Raised in Melbourne, Owies played junior football for Camberwell Sharks and school football for St Kevin's, but was also a skilled basketballer, and at age 15 he switched his primary focus to basketball. As a point guard, Owies represented Australia at the 2014 FIBA Under-17 World Championship, and played for the Dandenong Rangers in the South East Australian Basketball League.

=== Basketball scholarship ===
Following his junior success, Owies received an athletic scholarship to play NCAA men's basketball for the Hawaii Rainbow Warriors. He played with the Rainbow Warriors as a true freshman in the 2016–17 season; he then sat out the 2017–18 season to transfer to the Seattle Redhawks.

== Switch back to Australian football ==
During 2018, Owies opted to return to Australia and football, and signed with the Carlton Football Club at the end of the 2018 season as a Category B rookie, a category for players who have not been registered with a football club for at least three years. After almost two years of development as a small marking forward, Owies made his senior AFL debut on 8 September 2020 against the Sydney Swans at Metricon Stadium, the only game he played for the season. Owies' next game came early in the 2021 season, in which he kicked his first career goal in a three-goal performance against Essendon. Owies established himself in the Carlton forward-line over the next two years, and was elevated to the senior list in 2023.

=== Trade to West Coast ===
Following the 2024 AFL season, the out-of-contract Owies was put up for trade by Carlton. He was ultimately traded to West Coast on 15 October.

After playing 16 games for West Coast in the 2025 AFL season, he was only selected for three more games in 2026, before being delisted at the end of the season, despite having a further year to run on his contract.

== Personal life ==
Owies currently studies a Bachelor of Exercise and Sport Science at Deakin University.

== Statistics ==
Updated to the end of round 22, 2026.

Legend
G	Goals	K	Kicks	D	Disposals	T	Tackles
B	Behinds	H	Handballs	M	Marks

Season	Team	No.	Games	Totals							Averages (per game)							Votes
Season	Team	No.	Games	G	B	K	H	D	M	T	G	B	K	H	D	M	T	Votes
2020 (Note: The 2020 season was played with 17 home-and-away matches per team (down from 22) and 16-minute quarters with time on (down from 20-minute quarters with time on) due to the impact of the COVID-19 pandemic.)	Carlton	44	1	0	0	3	2	5	1	1	0.0	0.0	3.0	2.0	5.0	1.0	1.0	0
2021	Carlton	44	13	15	17	69	46	115	43	38	1.2	1.3	5.3	3.5	8.8	3.3	2.9	0
2022	Carlton	44	17	14	11	103	59	162	43	66	0.8	0.6	6.1	3.5	9.5	2.5	3.9	0
2023	Carlton	44	18	27	12	107	54	161	48	44	1.5	0.7	5.9	3.0	8.9	2.7	2.4	0
2024	Carlton	44	23	33	13	133	66	199	67	52	1.4	0.6	5.8	2.9	8.7	2.9	2.3	0
2025	West Coast	16	16	7	9	89	54	143	46	38	0.4	0.6	5.6	3.4	8.9	2.9	2.4	0
2026	West Coast	16	3	2	2	18	6	24	10	10	0.7	0.7	6.0	2.0	8.0	3.3	3.3	0
Career			91	98	64	522	287	809	258	249	1.1	0.7	5.7	3.2	8.9	2.8	2.7	0
