= Malik Newman =

American basketball player (born 1997)

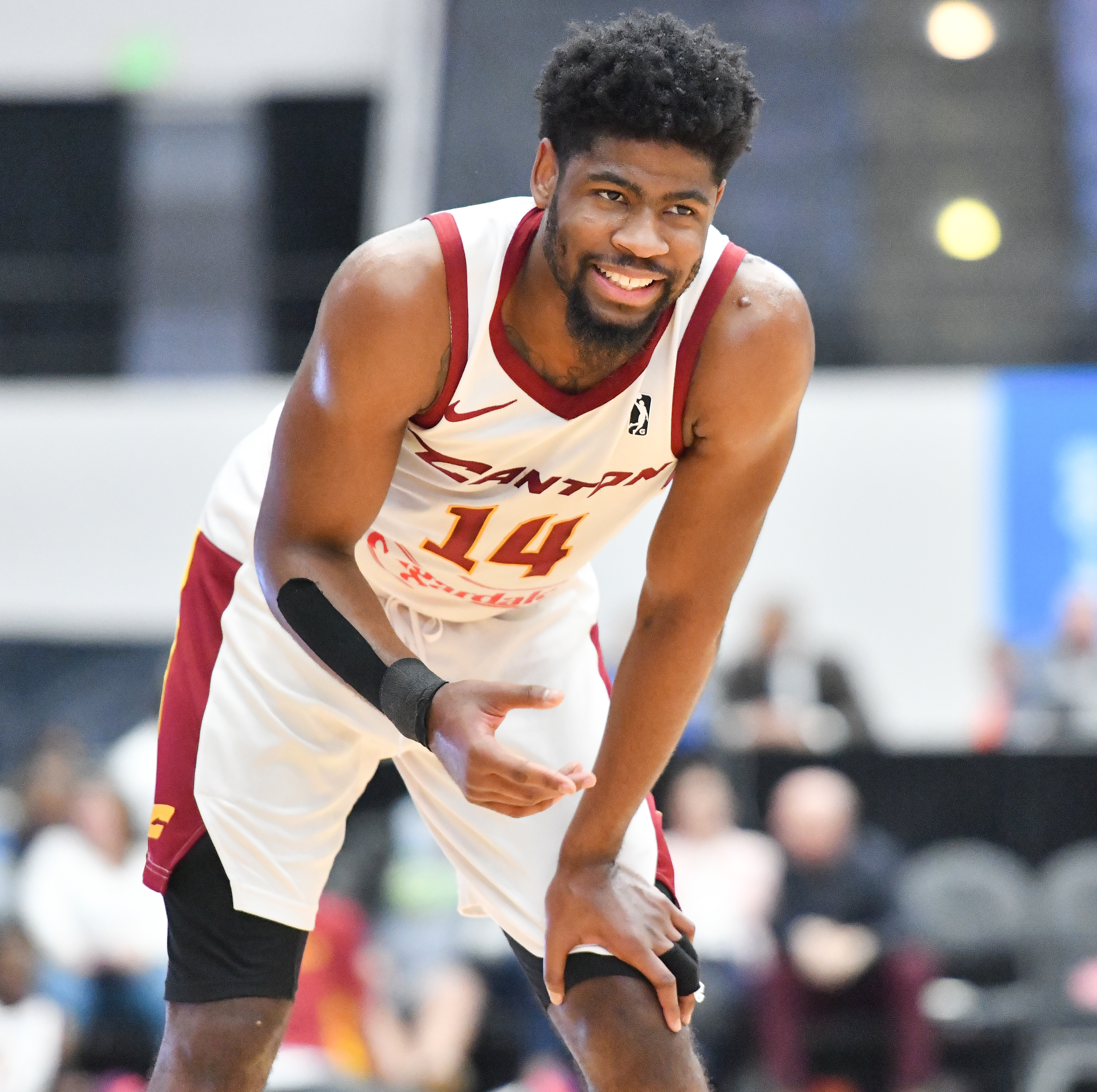
- Newman with the Canton Charge in 2020

Free agent
- Position: Shooting guard

Personal information
- Born: February 21, 1997 (age 29) Shreveport, Louisiana, U.S.
- Listed height: 6 ft 3 in (1.91 m)
- Listed weight: 190 lb (86 kg)

Career information
- High school: Callaway (Jackson, Mississippi)
- College: Mississippi State (2015–2016); Kansas (2017–2018)
- NBA draft: 2018: undrafted
- Playing career: 2018–present

Career history
- 2018–2019: Sioux Falls Skyforce
- 2019–2020: Canton Charge
- 2020: Cleveland Cavaliers
- 2020–2021: Frutti Extra Bursaspor
- 2021: Ironi Nahariya
- 2021–2022: Cleveland Cavaliers
- 2021–2022: →Cleveland Charge
- 2022–2023: Avtodor Saratov
- 2023: Zhejiang Golden Bulls
- 2023–2024: Avtodor Saratov
- 2024: Jilin Northeast Tigers
- 2024–2025: Napoli Basket
- 2025: Merkezefendi
- 2025–2026: Avtodor Saratov
- 2026: Zenit Saint Petersburg

Career highlights
- VTB United League Top Scorer (2023); Big 12 Newcomer of the Year (2018); Big 12 tournament MVP (2018); First-team Parade All-American (2015); McDonald's All-American (2015); 3× Mississippi Mr. Basketball (2013–2015); FIBA Under-17 World Cup MVP (2014); FIBA Americas Under-16 Championship MVP (2013)
- Stats at NBA.com
- Stats at Basketball Reference
Medals
Men's basketball
Representing the United States
FIBA U17 World Cup
Gold medal – first place	2014 Dubai	National team
FIBA Americas U16 Championship
Gold medal – first place	2013 Maldonado	National team

Malik Ti Derious Newman (born February 21, 1997) is an American professional basketball player who last played for Zenit Saint Petersburg of the VTB United League. He played college basketball for the Mississippi State Bulldogs and the Kansas Jayhawks. He attended Callaway High School in Jackson, Mississippi. He helped lead Callaway to four straight victories in the MHSAA Class 5A boys basketball championship. As a senior his jersey number 14 was retired by the school.

== High school career ==
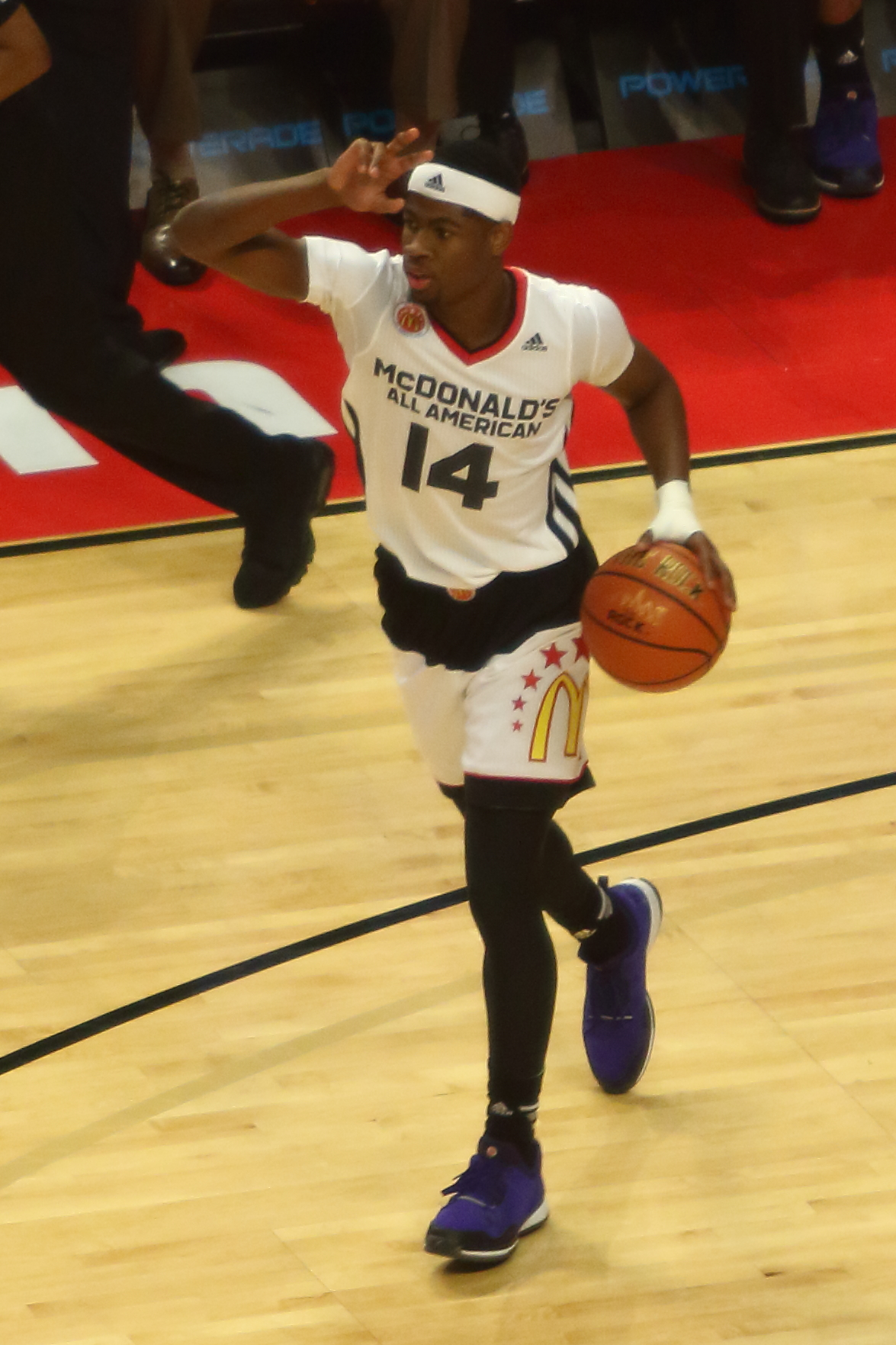
Newman at the 2015 McDonald's All-American Game

Newman attended Callaway High School in Jackson, Mississippi all four years of his high school basketball career. As a junior, Newman scored 25 points, 6 rebounds, and 2 blocks to defeat Vicksburg High School to win the 2014 Mississippi Class 5A Championship. In August 2014, Newman was named the MVP of the 2014 FIBA Under-17 World Championship. As a senior, Newman averaged 29.7 points, 5.7 rebounds, and 4.2 assist per game while leading the Chargers to a (31–3) overall record. Newman was selected to play in the 2015 McDonald's All-American Boys Game, Jordan Brand Classic, and Nike Hoop Summit. He was rated by Rivals.com as a five-star recruit and was ranked as the eighth best overall player, while ESPN ranked him 10th overall in the Class of 2015. Newman committed to Mississippi State University to play college basketball.

== College career ==
=== Mississippi State ===
On April 24, 2015, he signed to play college basketball at Mississippi State University, where his father, Horatio Webster, played from 1997 to 1998. During his freshman season he averaged 11.3 points per game.

=== Kansas ===
On July 1, 2016, he decided to transfer and committed to play at the University of Kansas. Per NCAA regulations, he redshirted during the Jayhawks 2016–2017 season.

In his first and only season with the Jayhawks, Newman averaged 14.2 points, 5.0 rebounds and 2.1 assists per game and was named Big 12 Newcomer of the Year. On March 25, 2018, Malik scored 13 of the Jayhawks' points in overtime and finished with a career-high 32 to lead the Jayhawks to the NCAA Final Four in a victory over Duke University.

== Professional career ==
=== Sioux Falls Skyforce (2018–2019) ===
After going undrafted in the 2018 NBA draft, Newman signed a two-way contract with the Los Angeles Lakers on July 1, 2018. Following the conclusion of the Summer League, the Lakers released him on July 19.

On August 6, 2018, Newman signed an Exhibit 10 contract with the Miami Heat. He was waived on October 7. Newman was signed by the Sioux Falls Skyforce of the NBA G League on October 10. In 17 games with the Skyforce, Newman averaged 9.5 points and 2.6 rebounds per game.

=== Canton Charge (2019–2020) ===
On January 5, 2019, Newman was traded to the Canton Charge for forward Emanuel Terry. On November 21, Newman had 26 points, three rebounds, four assists, and three steals during a win over the Erie BayHawks. In January 2020, he scored over 20 points in five straight games. Newman finished second on the team in scoring at 16.1 points per game.

=== Cleveland Cavaliers (2020) ===
On February 9, 2020, the Cleveland Cavaliers announced that they had signed Newman to a 10-day contract. Newman made his NBA debut that evening against the Los Angeles Clippers and scored two points on a pair of free throws in four minutes of action. It was his only NBA regular-season appearance.

=== Bursaspor (2020–2021) ===
On June 29, 2020, Newman signed with Frutti Extra Bursaspor of the Turkish Super League (BSL).

=== Ironi Nahariya (2021) ===
On January 16, 2021, Newman signed with Ironi Nahariya of the Israeli Basketball Premier League. In 2020-21 he was third in the Israel Basketball Premier League in free throw percentage (91.8 per cent).

=== Cleveland Charge (2021) ===
On October 23, 2021, Newman signed with the Cleveland Charge. He averaged 17.8 points, 3.2 rebounds and 3.9 assists per game.

=== Cleveland Cavaliers (2021–2022) ===
On December 29, 2021, Newman signed a 10-day contract with the Cleveland Cavaliers via the NBA's hardship exception.

=== Return to the Charge (2022) ===
On January 8, 2022, Newman was reacquired by the Cleveland Charge. On March 28, he was waived after suffering a season-ending injury.

=== Avtodor Saratov (2022–2023) ===
On November 5, 2022, he signed with Avtodor Saratov of the VTB United League.

=== Zhejiang Golden Bulls (2023) ===
On September 8, 2023, Newman signed with the Zhejiang Golden Bulls of the Chinese Basketball Association (CBA).

=== Return to Avtodor Saratov (2023–2024) ===
On December 25, 2023, Newman returned to Avtodor Saratov of the VTB United League.

=== Napoli Basket (2024–2025) ===
On December 9, 2024, Newman signed with Napoli Basket of the Lega Basket Serie A.

=== Merkezefendi Basket (2025) ===
On January 16, 2025, he signed with Merkezefendi Basket of the Basketbol Süper Ligi (BSL).

=== Third stint with Avtodor Saratov (2025–2026) ===
On August 29, 2025, Newman signed with Avtodor Saratov of the VTB United League.

=== Zenit Saint Petersburg (2026) ===
On September 29, 2026, Newman signed with Zenit Saint Petersburg of the Russian VTB United League. After appearing in only 3 games, Newman and Zenit agreed to part ways on October 13, 2026.

== Career statistics ==
Legend
GP	Games played	GS	Games started	MPG	Minutes per game
FG%	Field goal percentage	3P%	3-point field goal percentage	FT%	Free throw percentage
RPG	Rebounds per game	APG	Assists per game	SPG	Steals per game
BPG	Blocks per game	PPG	Points per game	**Bold**	Career high

=== Regular season ===
Year	Team	GP	GS	MPG	FG%	3P%	FT%	RPG	APG	SPG	BPG	PPG
2019–20	Cleveland	**1**	0	4.0	.000	.000	**1.000**	.0	.0	.0	.0	2.0
2021–22	Cleveland	**1**	0	**8.0**	**.600**	.000	**1.000**	**1.0**	**1.0**	.0	.0	**8.0**
Career		2	0	6.0	.429	.000	1.000	.5	.5	.0	.0	5.0

=== College ===
Year	Team	GP	GS	MPG	FG%	3P%	FT%	RPG	APG	SPG	BPG	PPG
2015–16	Mississippi State	29	22	27.2	.391	.379	.687	2.8	**2.2**	.4	.1	11.3
2017–18	Kansas	**39**	**33**	**31.6**	**.463**	**.415**	**.835**	**5.0**	2.1	**1.1**	**.2**	**14.2**
Career		68	55	30.0	.433	.399	.780	4.1	2.1	.8	.1	13.0
