= Luc Loubaki =

French basketball player

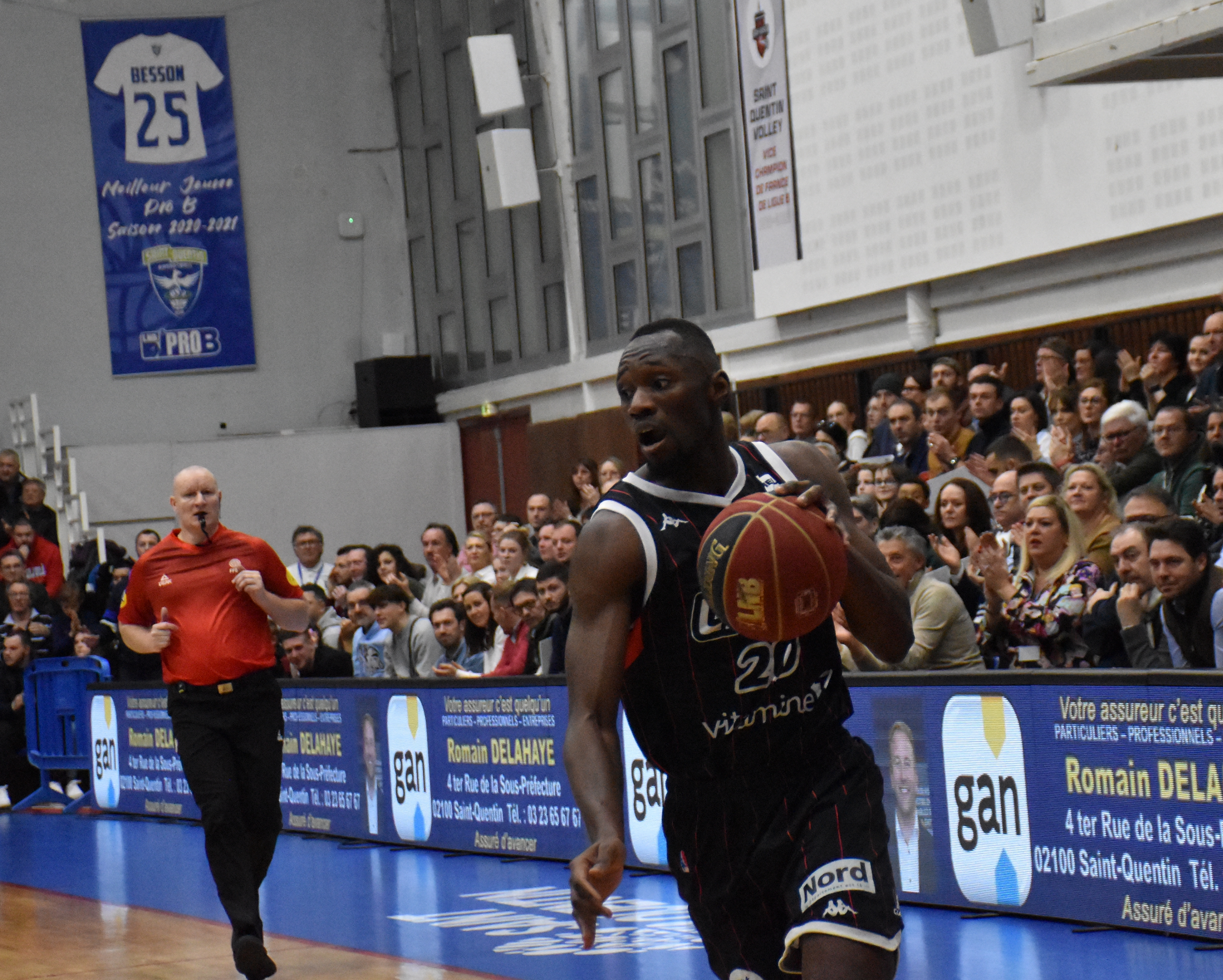
- Luc Loubaki in February 2023

No. 20 – Lille Métropole
- Position: Guard
- League: LNB Pro B

Personal information
- Born: January 20, 1997 (age 29) Pontoise, France
- Listed height: 191 cm (6 ft 3 in)

Career history
- 2015–2017: Orléans
- 2017–2019: Monaco
- 2019–2021: Lille Métropole
- 2021–2022: Boulazac Basket Dordogne
- 2022–present: Lille Métropole

Career highlights
- Leaders Cup winner (2018); Basketball Without Borders Europe Camp MVP (2014)

Luc Arnaud Loubaki (born January 20, 1997, in Pontoise) is a French professional basketball player for Lille Métropole of the LNB Pro B.

== Professional career ==
Having come through the youth ranks of Entente Cergy-Osny-Pontoise, Loubaki joined the Paris-Levallois youth set-up in 2010. He won the 2012 French national junior championship with the club and subsequently enrolled at INSEP, the French National Institute of Sport, expertise, and performance. Loubaki played in the 2013 Jordan Brand Classic International Game, scoring 10 points. In 2014, he garnered MVP honors at the Basketball Without Borders Europe Camp in Rome. As a member of the INSEP squad, Loubaki competed in the third-tier league NM1 and graduated in 2015. In his final season at INSEP, he averaged 9.7 points, 2.4 rebounds, 2.1 assists and 1.8 steals a contest in NM1 play.

In July 2015, Loubaki signed his first professional contract, a five-year deal with Orléans Loiret Basket of the French top-flight LNB Pro A. He was an early entry candidate for the 2016 NBA draft, but removed his name from the list.

He inked with AS Monaco Basket prior to the 2017-18 season.

On April 18, 2019, he has signed contract with Lille Métropole of the French LNB Pro B.

On July 15, 2021, he has signed with Boulazac Basket Dordogne of the LNB Pro B.

=== National team ===
He was part of the French junior national teams on several occasions, including the 2013 U16 and 2015 U18 European Championship as well as the 2014 U17 World Championships.
