= Serbia men's national under-17 basketball team =

Serbian Basketball Team

Serbia U-17
- FIBA zone: FIBA Europe
- National federation: KSS
- Coach: Stevan Mijović
- Nickname: Orlići (The Eaglets)

World Cup
- Appearances: 5
- Medals: 2026; 2014

First international
- Serbia 99–67 Egypt (Hamburg, Germany; 2 July 2010)
Medal record
Silver medal – second place	2026 Turkey
Bronze medal – third place	2014 United Arab Emirates

The Serbian men's national under-17 basketball team (Serbian Cyrillic: Кошаркашка репрезентација Србије до 17 година) is the boys' basketball team, administered by the Basketball Federation of Serbia, that represents Serbia in international under-17 (under age 17) men's basketball competitions, consisting mainly of the FIBA Under-17 Basketball World Cup.

== World Cup record ==
Year	Pos.	GP	W	L	Ref.
(Germany) 2010	5th	8	4	4	
(Lithuania) 2012	Did not qualify				
(United Arab Emirates) 2014	Bronze medal	7	6	1	
(Spain) 2016	Did not qualify				
(Argentina) 2018	10th	7	4	3	
(Spain) 2022	5th	7	5	2	
(Turkey) 2024	Did not qualify				
(Turkey) 2026	Silver medal	7	5	2	
(Greece) 2028	To be determined				
Total	5/9	36	24	12	

Updated on 5 July 2026

== Coaches ==
Years	Head coach	Assistant coach(es)
2010	Nenad Trunić	
2012	Did not qualify	—
2014	Vanja Guša	
2016	Did not qualify	—
2018	Slobodan Klipa	Bojan Simanić, Zoran Vraneš, Ljubiša Stojiljković
2022	Dragoljub Avramović	Tomislav Tomović, Marko Spasić
2026	Stevan Mijovic	Nikola Nesic, Dejan Dokic

== Team ==
=== Rosters ===
2010 Championship	2014 Championship	2018 Cup	2022 Cup	2026 Cup
4 Aleksandar Cvetković; 5 Nikola Rakićević; 6 Marko Radonjić; 7 Nemanja Dangubić; 8 Nikola Čvorović; 9 Luka Mitrović; 10 Nenad Miljenović; 11 Nemanja Krstić; 12 Nikola Janković; 13 Đorđe Milošević; 14 Nemanja Bezbradica; 15 Marko Ćirović	4 Stefan Peno; 5 Nikola Ćirković; 6 Vanja Marinković; 7 Marko Armus; 8 Slobodan Jovanović; 9 Vojislav Stojanović; 10 Nikola Rakićević; 11 Nikola Popović; 12 Ivan Bojanić; 13 Stefan Kenić; 14 Aleksandar Aranitović; 15 David Miladinović	0 Vladan Musić; 2 Aleksej Pokuševski; 5 Marko Pavićević; 6 Stevan Karapandžić; 7 Đorđe Pažin; 9 Lazar Živanović; 10 Lazar Vasić; 11 Aleksandar Langović; 13 Aleksa Marković; 14 Dušan Tanasković; 15 Nemanja Popović; 32 David Petrušev	4 Đorđe Ćurčić; 5 Asim Đulović; 6 Bogoljub Marković; 7 Andrej Mušicki; 8 Mitar Bošnjaković; 9 Pavle Nikolić; 16 Ognjen Stanković; 23 Danilo Dožić; 31 Matija Milošević; 34 Filip Jović; 35 Lazar Gačić; 70 Viktor Mikić	2 Luka Galić; 3 Nikola Durović; 7 Vuk Stepanović; 9 Ognjen Simjanovski; 10 Marko Veselinović; 11 Matija Lukić; 12 Vaso Šaponjić; 18 Luka Miladinović; 22 Petar Bjelica; 25 Nikola Kusturica; 31 Lazar Miličić; 95 Luka Pavlović

=== Individual awards ===
World Cup All-Tournament Team

- Nikola Rakićević – 2014
- Nikola Kusturica – 2026

Best defensive player

- Nikola Kusturica – 2026

Statistical leaders: Assists

- Ognjen Stanković – 2022

== See also ==
- Serbian men's university basketball team
- Serbia men's national under-20 basketball team
- Serbia men's national under-19 basketball team
- Serbia men's national under-18 basketball team
- Serbia men's national under-16 basketball team
