= Dejan Vasiljevic =

Australian basketball player (born 1997)

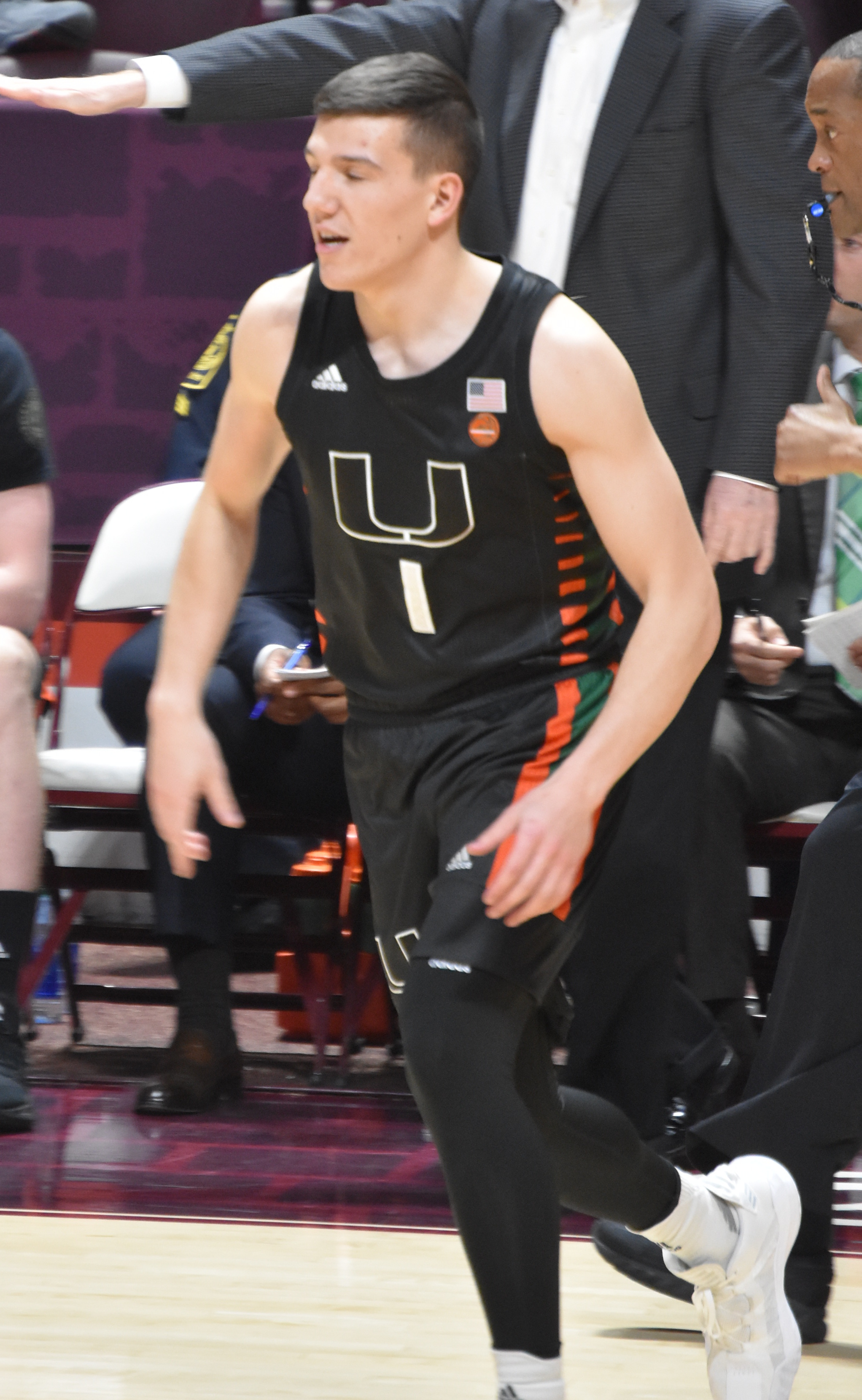
- Vasiljevic with the Miami Hurricanes in 2020

No. 34 – New Zealand Breakers
- Position: Shooting guard
- League: NBL

Personal information
- Born: 26 April 1997 (age 29) Calgary, Alberta, Canada
- Listed height: 190 cm (6 ft 3 in)
- Listed weight: 94 kg (207 lb)

Career information
- High school: Bacchus Marsh Grammar (Bacchus Marsh, Victoria); Lake Ginninderra (Canberra, ACT)
- College: Miami (Florida) (2016–2020)
- NBA draft: 2020: undrafted
- Playing career: 2013–present

Career history
- 2013: Melbourne Tigers
- 2014–2015: BA Centre of Excellence
- 2016: Diamond Valley Eagles
- 2020–2023: Sydney Kings
- 2022–2023: Diamond Valley Eagles
- 2023–2026: Adelaide 36ers
- 2024: Waverley Falcons
- 2025: Forestville Eagles
- 2026: Sturt Sabres
- 2026–present: New Zealand Breakers

Career highlights
- 2× NBL champion (2022, 2023); NBL1 South All-Star Five (2022)
- Stats at Basketball Reference
Medals
Men's basketball
Representing Australia
FIBA Under-17 World Cup
Silver medal – second place	2014 United Arab Emirates	Team
Universiade
Bronze medal – third place	2019 Italy	Team

Dejan "DJ" Vasiljevic (born 26 April 1997) is an Australian professional basketball player for the New Zealand Breakers of the National Basketball League (NBL). He played college basketball for the Miami Hurricanes before joining the Sydney Kings in 2020. He won two NBL championships with the Kings in 2022 and 2023.

== Early life and career ==
Vasiljevic was born in Calgary, Alberta, to semi-pro Serbian handball players. He moved with his family to Melbourne at the age of six. Growing up, Vasiljevic played soccer, tennis, and cricket, and did not begin playing basketball until the age of 12. His father attempted to mold him after Croatian basketball player Drazen Petrovic. He attended Bacchus Marsh Grammar School in Bacchus Marsh, Victoria.

In 2013, Vasiljevic played one game for the Melbourne Tigers in the Big V. He moved to Canberra in 2014 to attend the Australian Institute of Sport (AIS). In 2014 and 2015, he played for the BA Centre of Excellence in the South East Australian Basketball League (SEABL).

While at the AIS in Canberra, Vasiljevic attended Lake Ginninderra College. He helped Lake Ginninderra win the national title at the 2015 Australian schools championships alongside teammate Jack White. Vasiljevic scored 45 points in the final.

In 2016, Vasiljevic played nine games for the Diamond Valley Eagles in the Big V.

== College career ==
Vasiljevic was recruited by Stanford, LSU, Louisville, and California, but he signed with the Miami Hurricanes because he liked the academics and his family loved the city.

Vasiljevic set the Miami freshman record for made three-pointers (51) while averaging 6.0 points and 1.3 rebounds per game. He posted 9.0 points and 2.5 rebounds per game as a sophomore, while shooting 41.1 percent from three-point range. At the end of his sophomore season, Vasiljevic suffered a stress fracture in his foot. Instead of surgery, he went on a nutrition plan crafted by his girlfriend, and lost some weight. As a junior, Vasiljevic averaged 11.8 points and 4.5 rebounds per game on a team that finished 14–18. Following his junior season, Vasiljevic considered turning professional, but was persuaded to return by coach Jim Larrañaga. On 21 November 2019, he scored a career-high 25 points including the two clinching foul shots with 1.2 seconds remaining in a 74–70 win over Missouri State. As a senior, Vasiljevic averaged 13.2 points and 4.2 rebounds per game. He scored 1,271 points in his college career, ranking 21st on the Hurricane's all-time list, and is second in made three-pointers with 272.

== Professional career ==
After going undrafted in the 2020 NBA draft, Vasiljevic signed with the Sydney Kings of the National Basketball League (NBL) on 17 July 2020. In 21 games in the 2020–21 NBL season, he averaged 15.4 points, 3.6 rebounds and 1.8 assists per game.

In the 2021–22 NBL season, Vasiljevic helped the Kings win the championship. In 31 games, he averaged 12.4 points, 2.8 rebounds and 1.4 assists per game.

In the 2022 off-season, Vasiljevic played for the Phoenix Suns in the NBA Summer League and the Diamond Valley Eagles in the NBL1 South during the 2022 NBL1 season.

On 4 January 2023, Vasiljevic scored a career-high 42 points with ten 3-pointers in the Kings' 118–102 win over the South East Melbourne Phoenix. He went on to help the Kings win back-to-back NBL championships. In 36 games in 2022–23, he averaged 13.4 points, 4.3 rebounds and 1.8 assists per game. He opted out of his contract with the Kings following the season and returned to the Diamond Valley Eagles for a short stint during the 2023 NBL1 season.

Vasiljevic played for the Washington Wizards in the 2023 NBA Summer League and then joined the team for a brief pre-season stint.

On 17 October 2023, Vasiljevic signed with the Adelaide 36ers for the rest of the 2023–24 NBL season. On 29 January 2024, he signed a three-year contract extension with the 36ers.

Vasiljevic joined the Waverley Falcons for the 2024 NBL1 South season.

On 5 December 2024, Vasiljevic was ruled out for a month with a hamstring injury. On 19 January 2025, he scored 32 points and made ten 3-pointers, including seven 3-pointers in the first quarter, in the 36ers' 99–75 win over the Cairns Taipans.

Vasiljevic joined the Forestville Eagles of the NBL1 Central for the 2025 season. He helped the Eagles finish the regular season on top of the ladder.

Prior to the 2025–26 NBL season, Vasiljevic was named co-captain of the 36ers alongside Bryce Cotton and Isaac Humphries. In game three of the semi-finals series, he scored 27 points with six 3-pointers in a 108–96 victory to win the series 2–1 over the South East Melbourne Phoenix, helping advance the 36ers through to the NBL Championship Series.

On 20 April 2026, Vasiljevic and the 36ers mutually agreed to part ways after three seasons and 90 games. He subsequently joined the Sturt Sabres for the 2026 NBL1 Central season.

On 28 April 2026, Vasiljevic signed with the New Zealand Breakers for the 2026–27 NBL season. On 13 November 2026, he scored 36 points in a 94–90 overtime win over the Brisbane Bullets.

== National team career ==
Vasiljevic has represented Australia at several international tournaments. In the 2013 FIBA Oceania U16 Tournament, he averaged 20 points per game. He won a silver medal at the 2014 FIBA Under-17 World Championship in Dubai and was named to the all-tournament team after averaging 17.4 points and 6.6 rebounds per game. At the 2015 FIBA Under-19 World Championship in Heraklion, Vasiljevic averaged 13.3 points and 3.1 rebounds per game.

In 2019, Vasiljevic helped Australia win bronze at the Summer Universiade in Italy, scoring 33 points in the consolation win against Israel.

Vasiljevic debuted for the Australian Boomers during the FIBA World Cup qualifiers in 2021. He re-joined the Boomers for 2025 FIBA Asia Cup qualifiers in 2024.

In April 2025, Vasiljevic was named in the Boomers squad for a trans-Tasman series against New Zealand in May.

== Personal life ==
Vasiljevic is a dual national of Canada and Australia.
