= Greece men's national under-17 basketball team =

Greece
- Joined FIBA: 1932
- FIBA zone: FIBA Europe
- Coach: vacant

FIBA Under-17 Basketball World Cup
- Appearances: 1
Home	Away

The Greek men's national under-17 basketball team (Greek: Εθνική ομάδα καλαθοσφαίρισης Παίδων Ελλάδας) is the Under-17 age representative for Greece in international youth basketball competitions. It is organized and run by the Hellenic Basketball Federation (Ε.Ο.Κ.). The Greek Under-17 national basketball team represents Greece at the FIBA Under-17 Basketball World Cup.

== FIBA Under-17 Basketball World Cup ==
Year	Position
(Germany) 2010	Did Not Participate
(Lithuania) 2012	Did Not Participate
(United Arab Emirates) 2014	12th
(Spain) 2016	Did Not Participate
(Argentina) 2018	Did Not Participate
(Spain) 2022	Did Not Participate
(Turkey) 2024	Did Not Qualify
(Turkey) 2026	Did not qualify
(Greece) 2028	Qualified as host
Total	2/9
