= 2022–23 Second Men's League of Serbia (basketball) =

Basketball League of Serbia season

- League: Second League of Serbia
- Season: 2022–23
- Games played: 22 each
- Teams: 16

Finals
- Champions: SPD Radnički
- Runners-up: Joker

Seasons
- ← 2021–22 2023–24 →

The 2022–23 Second Men's League of Serbia is the 17th season of the Second Basketball League of Serbia, the 2nd-tier men's professional basketball league in Serbia.

== Teams ==
A total of 16 teams participated in the 2022–23 Second Men's League of Serbia, divided into two geographical groups with 8 clubs. On 1 July 2022, the Basketball Federation of Serbia confirmed the teams for the 2022–23 season, with a note given to Radnik.

=== Promotion and relegation ===
The following are the team changes of Second League from the 2021–22 season:

Incoming
Relegated from First League	Promoted from First Regional League
Radnički Kragujevac; Slodes SoccerBet	Joker; Beko; Morava; Radnički 1950

Outgoing
Promoted to First League	Relegated to First Regional League
Spartak Office Shoes; Čačak 94	Konstantin; Proleter Naftagas; Napredak Junior; Beovuk 72

=== Venues and locations ===
Location of teams in the 2022–23 season

Team	City	Arena	Capacity
Beko	Belgrade	Padinska Skela Hall	600
Borac Zemun	Belgrade	Pinki Hall	2,000
Hercegovac	Gajdobra	Gajdobra Sports Hall	—
Joker	Sombor	Mostonga Hall	1,000
Klik	Arilje	Arilje Sports Hall	—
Mladost SP	Smederevska Palanka	Vuk Karadžić School Hall	500
Morava	Vladičin Han	Vladičin Han Sports Hall	—
Napredak	Aleksinac	Aleksinac Sports Hall	1,400
Pirot	Pirot	Pirot Kej Hall	835
Radnički 1950	Kragujevac	Jezero Hall	3,750
Radnik	Surdulica	Surdulica Sports Hall	800
Slodes	Belgrade	Slodes Hall	2,000
SPD Radnički	Kragujevac	Jezero Hall	3,750
Star	Novi Sad	SPC Vojvodina	1,030
Železničar	Čačak	Borac Hall	4,000
Žitko Basket	Belgrade	Master Sport Center	750

=== Head coaches ===
Team	Head coach	Coaching changes
Beko	(Serbia) Nenad Petronić	—
Borac Zemun	(Serbia) Marko Boras	Pavle Trifunović
Hercegovac	(Serbia) Miloš Luburić	Radomir Kisić
Joker	(Serbia) Nebojša Vagić	—
Klik	(Serbia) Dragan Mitrović	Branko Jorović (until Jul 2022)
Mladost SP	(Serbia) Ivan Stefanović	—
Morava	(Serbia) Perica Mitić	—
Napredak	(Serbia) Nenad Stojković	Slaviša Bogavac
Pirot	(Serbia) Zoran Milovanović	—
Radnički 1950	(Serbia) Nenad Nikolić	Igor Todorović
Radnik	(Serbia) Vuk Lepojević	Perica Mitić
Slodes	(Serbia) Dušan Petrović	—
Star	(Serbia) Aleksandar Komnenić	—
SPD Radnički	(Serbia) Stevan Mijović	Filip Socek
Železničar	(Serbia) Aleksandar Bjelić	—
Žitko Basket	(Serbia) Nenad Karanović	Marko Boras

== Regular season ==
=== Group A ===
Pos	Team	Pld	W	L	PF	PA	PD	Pts	Qualification or relegation
1	Joker	14	11	3	1353	1172	+181	25	Qualification to Playoff
2	SPD Radnički	14	11	3	1247	1125	+122	25	Qualification to Playoff
3	Hercegovac	14	8	6	1190	1201	−11	22	Qualification to Playoff
4	Star	14	8	6	1180	1196	−16	22	Qualification to Playoff
5	Mladost SP	14	6	8	1154	1135	+19	20	Qualification to Playout
6	Klik	14	6	8	1100	1157	−57	20	Qualification to Playout
7	Morava	14	4	10	1075	1169	−94	18	Qualification to Playout
8	Železničar	14	2	12	1065	1209	−144	16	Qualification to Playout

Source: SrbijaSport

=== Group B ===
Pos	Team	Pld	W	L	PF	PA	PD	Pts	Qualification or relegation
1	Borac Zemun	14	12	2	1271	1101	+170	26	Qualification to Playoff
2	Pirot	14	9	5	1236	1145	+91	23	Qualification to Playoff
3	Slodes	14	8	6	1197	1200	−3	22	Qualification to Playoff
4	Radnik	14	8	6	1122	1127	−5	22	Qualification to Playoff
5	Žitko Basket	14	6	8	1141	1151	−10	20	Qualification to Playout
6	Radnički 1950	14	6	8	1091	1125	−34	20	Qualification to Playout
7	Napredak	14	4	10	1056	1185	−129	18	Qualification to Playout
8	Beko	14	3	11	1065	1145	−80	17	Qualification to Playout

Source: SrbijaSport

== Play Off ==
Pos	Team	Pld	W	L	PF	PA	PD	Pts	Qualification or relegation
1	SPD Radnički	14	12	2	1286	1154	+132	26	Qualification to 2023–24 Basketball League of Serbia
2	Joker	14	10	4	1409	1183	+226	24	Qualification to 2023–24 Basketball League of Serbia
3	Hercegovac	14	8	6	1265	1211	+54	22	
4	Pirot	14	8	6	1290	1258	+32	22	
5	Borac Zemun	14	7	7	1258	1223	+35	21	
6	Star	14	6	8	1178	1281	−103	20	
7	Radnik	14	4	10	1101	1261	−160	18	
8	Slodes	14	1	13	1165	1381	−216	15	

Source: SrbijaSport

== Play Out ==
Pos	Team	Pld	W	L	PF	PA	PD	Pts	Qualification or relegation
1	Morava	14	12	2	1203	1099	+104	26	
2	Mladost SP	14	11	3	1190	1060	+130	25	
3	Klik	14	10	4	1136	1028	+108	24	
4	Železničar	14	9	5	1064	972	+92	23	
5	Radnički 1950	14	5	9	1094	1154	−60	19	Relegated to First Regional Basketball League
6	Napredak	14	4	10	1122	1263	−141	18	Relegated to First Regional Basketball League
7	Žitko Basket	14	3	11	1014	1114	−100	17	Relegated to First Regional Basketball League
8	Beko	14	2	12	994	1127	−133	16	Relegated to First Regional Basketball League

Source: SrbijaSport

== See also ==
- 2022–23 Basketball League of Serbia
