= 2022–23 Basketball League of Serbia =

Basketball League of Serbia season

- League: Basketball League of Serbia
- Season: 2022–23
- Dates: 1 October 2022 – 15 April 2023 (First League); May–June 2023 (Playoffs)
- Games played: 30 each (First League)
- Teams: 16 (First League); 21 (total)
- TV partner: Arena Sport

Seasons
- ← 2021–22 2023–24 →

The 2022–23 Admiral Bet Basketball League of Serbia (Serbian Cyrillic: Кошаркашка лига Србије 2022–23.) is the 17th season of the Basketball League of Serbia, the top-tier professional basketball league in Serbia. Also, it is the 78th national championship played by Serbian clubs inclusive of the nation's previous incarnations as Yugoslavia and Serbia & Montenegro.

Crvena zvezda mts is the 7-time defending champion.

== Teams ==
A total of 21 teams participate in the 2022–23 Basketball League of Serbia.

=== Distribution ===
The following is the access list for this season.

Access list for the 2022–23 Serbian League
	Teams entering in this round	Teams advancing from the previous round
First League (16 teams)	14 highest-placed teams from the last season; 2 highest-placed teams from the Second League	
Super League (8 teams)	3 Adriatic League teams (Borac, FMP, Mega)	5 highest-placed teams from the First League
Playoffs (4 teams)	2 Adriatic League teams (Crvena zvezda, Partizan)	2 group winners from the Super League

=== Promotion and relegation ===
Teams promoted from the Second League

- Spartak Office Shoes
- Čačak 94

Teams relegated to the Second League

- Radnički Kragujevac
- Slodes SoccerBet

=== Venues and locations ===
Location of clubs in the 2022–23 season

Club	Home city	Arena	Capacity
Borac Mozzart	Čačak	Borac Hall	3,000
Crvena zvezda mts	Belgrade	Aleksandar Nikolić Hall	5,878
Čačak 94 Quantox	Čačak	Borac Hall	3,000
Dunav	Stari Banovci	Park Hall	—N/a
Dynamic Balkan Bet	Belgrade	Ranko Žeravica Hall	5,000
FMP Meridian	Belgrade	Železnik Hall	3,000
Kolubara LA 2003	Lazarevac	Kolubara Sport Center	1,700
Mega MIS	Belgrade	Mega Factory Hall	700
Metalac	Valjevo	Valjevo Sports Hall	1,500
Mladost MaxBet	Zemun	Master Sport Center	750
Novi Pazar	Novi Pazar	Pendik Sports Hall	1,600
OKK Beograd	Belgrade	Mega Factory Hall	700
Partizan Mozzart Bet	Belgrade	Štark Arena	18,386
Sloboda	Užice	Veliki Park Hall	2,200
Sloga	Kraljevo	Kraljevo Sports Hall	3,350
Spartak Office Shoes	Subotica	Dudova Šuma Sports Center	3,000
Tamiš	Pančevo	Strelište Sports Hall	1,100
Vojvodina	Novi Sad	SPC Vojvodina	7,022
Vršac	Vršac	Millennium Center	4,400
Zdravlje	Leskovac	SRC Dubočica	3,600
Zlatibor Gold Gondola	Čajetina	Čajetina Sport Center	1,000

Clubs in the 2022–23 First Adriatic League
Clubs in the 2022–23 Second Adriatic League

== First League ==
=== Personnel and sponsorship ===
Club	Head coach	Captain	Kit manufacturer	Shirt sponsor
Čačak 94 Quantox	(Serbia) Ivan Radovanović	(Serbia) Radenko Pilčević	Ardu Sport	Quantox
Dunav	(Serbia) Mitar Ašćerić	(Serbia) Vuk Malidžan	—	Grad Stara Pazova
Dynamic Balkan Bet	(Serbia) Saša Nikitović	(Serbia) Nenad Šulović	Ardu Sport	Balkan Bet
Kolubara LA 2003	(Serbia) Saša Pavlović	(Serbia) Vukašin Sinđelić	Seven	MaxBet / Grad Lazarevac
Metalac	(Serbia) Branislav Ratkovica	(Serbia) Marko Bajić	Peak	—
Mladost MaxBet	(Serbia) Dragan Jakovljević	(Serbia) Marko Milenković	CK	MaxBet
Novi Pazar	(Serbia) Ivica Vukotić	(Serbia) Asmir Numanović	Maluro	Numanović
OKK Beograd	(Serbia) Vule Avdalović	(Serbia) Nenad Miljenović	Naai	—
Sloboda	(Serbia) Velimir Gašić	(Serbia) David Miladinović	Ardu Sport	mts
Sloga	(Serbia) Marko Dimitrijević	(Serbia) Stefan Matović	Maluro	—
Spartak Office Shoes	(Serbia) Željko Lukajić	(Serbia) Predrag Prlja	—	Office Shoes
Tamiš	(Serbia) Bojan Jovičić	(Serbia) Ivan Smiljanić	—	—
Vojvodina	(Serbia) Miloš Isakov Kovačević	(Serbia) Marko Ljubičić	Ardu Sport	—
Vršac	(Serbia) Siniša Matić	(Serbia) Bratislav Jeković	Ardu Sport	Villager / Element
Zdravlje	(Serbia) Nikola Ristić	(Serbia) Milan Radivojević	Maluro	—
Zlatibor Gold Gondola	(Serbia) Strajin Nedović	(Serbia) Nemanja Protić	Ardu Sport	Boje i fasade Maxima

=== Coaching changes ===
Team	Outgoing manager	Date of vacancy	Position in table	Replaced with	Date of appointment	Ref.
Vojvodina	(Serbia) Miroslav Nikolić	15 June 2022	Off-season	(Serbia) Miloš Isakov Kovačević	16 June 2022	
OKK Beograd	(Montenegro) Vasilije Budimić	17 June 2022	Off-season	(Serbia) Vule Avdalović	17 June 2022	
Sloboda	(Serbia) Oliver Popović	23 June 2022	Off-season	(Serbia) Velimir Gašić	23 June 2022	
Kolubara LA 2003	(Serbia) Stevan Mijović	June 2022	Off-season	(Serbia) Branko Jorović	4 July 2022	
Kolubara LA 2003	(Serbia) Branko Jorović	9 July 2022	Off-season	(Serbia) Darko Kostić	July 2022	
Novi Pazar	(Serbia) Darko Kostić	July 2022	Off-season	(Montenegro) Vasilije Budimić	9 July 2022	
Vršac	(Serbia) Siniša Matić	July 2022	Off-season	(Serbia) Vladimir Đokić	July 2022	
Čačak 94 Quantox	(Serbia) Ivan Radovanović	July 2022	Off-season	(Serbia) Vladimir Lučić	July 2022	
Zdravlje	(Serbia) Lazar Spasić	31 October 2022	13th (1–5)	(Serbia) Nikola Ristić	31 October 2022	
Spartak Office Shoes	(Serbia) Srećko Sekulović	6 November 2022	5th (5–2)	(Serbia) Oliver Kostić	9 November 2022	
Dunav	(Serbia) Milivoje Lazić	November 2022	16th (1–6)	(Serbia) Mitar Ašćerić	November 2022	
Novi Pazar	(Montenegro) Vasilije Budimić	24 November 2022	12th (2–7)	(Serbia) Ivica Vukotić	24 November 2022	
Čačak 94 Quantox	(Serbia) Vladimir Lučić	28 November 2022	16th (1–9)	(Serbia) Ivan Radovanović	28 November 2022	
Kolubara LA 2003	(Serbia) Darko Kostić	2022		(Serbia) Saša Pavlović	2022	
Spartak Office Shoes	(Serbia) Oliver Kostić	4 January 2023	5th (9–6)	(Serbia) Željko Lukajić	4 January 2023	

=== Standings ===
Pos	Team	Pld	W	L	PF	PA	PD	Pts	Qualification or relegation
1	Zlatibor Gold Gondola	30	22	8	2544	2338	+206	52	Qualification to Super League and ABA 2
2	Spartak Office Shoes	30	22	8	1790	1719	+71	52	Qualification to Super League and ABA 2
3	Vojvodina	30	22	8	1765	1644	+121	52	Qualification to Super League
4	Metalac	30	20	10	1806	1588	+218	50	Qualification to Super League
5	OKK Beograd	30	18	12	1757	1711	+46	48	Qualification to Super League
6	Dinamik	30	18	12	1636	1540	+96	48	
7	Tamiš	30	15	15	1620	1628	−8	45	
8	Vršac	30	14	16	1808	1690	+118	44	
9	Sloga	30	13	17	1590	1600	−10	43	
10	Mladost MaxBet	30	13	17	1760	1803	−43	43	
11	Čačak 94 Quantox	30	12	18	1626	1718	−92	42	
12	Sloboda	30	12	18	1617	1675	−58	42	
13	Novi Pazar	30	10	20	1623	1732	−109	40	
14	Zdravlje	30	9	21	1609	1688	−79	39	
15	Kolubara LA 2003	30	9	21	1588	1768	−180	39	Relegation to Second League
16	Dunav	30	11	19	1578	1837	−259	41	Relegation to Second League

Updated to match(es) played on 28 December 2022. Source: KLS, SrbijaSport

== SuperLeague ==
The Playoffs are the second stage of the 2022–23 Serbian League season. On 29 May 2023, Partizan announced withdrawal from the 2023 Serbian League playoffs following numerous postponements in the 2023 ABA League Finals.

=== Qualified teams ===
First ABA League	BLS First League
1 Partizan Mozzart Bet; 2 Crvena zvezda Meridianbet; 3 FMP Soccerbet; 4 Mega MIS; 5 Borac Mozzart	1 Zlatibor Gold Gondola; 2 Spartak Office Shoes; 3 Vojvodina; 4 Metalac; 5 OKK Beograd

==== Personnel and sponsorship ====
Team	Head coach	Captain	Kit manufacturer	Shirt sponsor
Borac Mozzart	(Serbia) Dejan Mijatović	(Serbia) Nemanja Todorović	—	P.S. Fashion / MozzartSport
Crvena zvezda Meridianbet	(Basketball Federation of Montenegro) Duško Ivanović	(Serbia) Branko Lazić	Adidas	Meridian
FMP Soccerbet	(Serbia) Nenad Stefanović	(United States) Charles Jenkins	Adidas	Soccerbet
Mega MIS	(Serbia) Marko Barać	(Serbia) Luka Cerovina	Adidas	Medical Innovation Solutions
Metalac	(Serbia) Branislav Ratkovica	(Serbia) Marko Bajić	Peak	—
OKK Beograd	(Serbia) Vule Avdalović	(Serbia) Nenad Miljenović	Naai	—
Partizan Mozzart Bet	(Serbia) Željko Obradović	(United States) Kevin Punter	Under Armour	NIS / Mozzart
Spartak Office Shoes	(Serbia) Željko Lukajić	(Serbia) Predrag Prlja	—	Office Shoes
Vojvodina	(Serbia) Miloš Isakov Kovačević	(Serbia) Marko Ljubičić	Ardu Sport	—
Zlatibor Gold Gondola	(Serbia) Strajin Nedović	(Serbia) Nemanja Protić	Ardu Sport	Boje i fasade Maxima

==== Coaching changes ====
Team	Outgoing manager	Date of vacancy	Position in table	Replaced with	Date of appointment	Ref.
Mega MIS	(Serbia) Vlada Jovanović	16 June 2022	Off-season	(Serbia) Marko Barać	20 June 2022	
Crvena zvezda mts	(Montenegro) Dejan Radonjić	30 June 2022	Off-season	(Serbia) Vladimir Jovanović	8 July 2022	
Crvena zvezda mts	(Basketball Federation of Serbia) Vladimir Jovanović	13 November 2022	Off-season	(Basketball Federation of Montenegro) Duško Ivanović	14 November 2022	
Borac Mozzart	(Basketball Federation of Serbia) Marko Marinović	28 November 2022	Off-season	(Basketball Federation of Serbia) Dejan Mijatović	28 November 2022	

=== SuperLeague Playoffs ===
Teams involved:

- 3 lowest-placed Serbian teams from the Adriatic League: FMP Soccerbet, Mega MIS, Borac Mozzart
- 5 highest-placed teams from the First League: Zlatibor Gold Gondola, Spartak Office Shoes, Vojvodina, Metalac, OKK Beograd

==== Group A ====
Pos	Team	Pld	W	L	PF	PA	PD	Pts		FMP	OKK	SPA	ZLA
1	FMP Soccerbet	6	5	1	564	494	+70	11	Qualification to SuperLeague Final Four	—	95–91	98–80	112–81
2	OKK Beograd	6	4	2	550	474	+76	10		82–84	—	87–67	91–76
3	Spartak Office Shoes	6	3	3	502	520	−18	9		82–78	80–101	—	103–81
4	Zlatibor Gold Gondola	6	0	6	463	591	−128	6		78–97	72–98	75–90	—

Source: KLS, SrbijaSport
Legend: Blue = home team win; Red = away team win.

==== Group B ====
Pos	Team	Pld	W	L	PF	PA	PD	Pts	Qualification or relegation	MEG	BOR	VOJ	MET
1	Mega MIS	6	5	1	531	458	+73	11	Qualification to SuperLeague Final Four	—	92–78	96–64	88–77
2	Borac Mozzart	6	4	2	511	486	+25	10		87–82	—	90–83	100–74
3	Vojvodina	6	3	3	480	498	−18	9		74–83	80–61	—	99–92
4	Metalac	6	0	6	472	552	−80	6		78–90	75–95	76–80	—

Updated to match(es) played on completed. Source: KLS, SrbijaSport
Legend: Blue = home team win; Red = away team win.

=== SuperLeague Final Four ===
Teams involved:

- 2 highest-placed Serbian teams from the First ABA League: Partizan Mozzart Bet (withdraw), Crvena zvezda Meridianbet
- 2 winners of the SuperLeague Playoffs: FMP Soccerbet, Mega MIS

Semifinals			Finals
			Crvena zvezda Meridianbet	94	82
			FMP Soccerbet	70	72
Mega MIS	72	70	FMP Soccerbet	70	72
FMP Soccerbet	75	96

== Clubs in European competitions ==
Competition	Team	Progress	Result
EuroLeague	Partizan Mozzart Bet	Playoffs	Eliminated in Quarterfinals by (Spanish Basketball Federation) Real Madrid, 2–3
EuroLeague	Crvena zvezda Meridianbet	Regular season	10th (17–17)
Champions League	FMP Meridian	Qualification Group D	Eliminated in final by (Denmark) Bakken Bears, 88–82

== See also ==
- List of current Basketball League of Serbia team rosters
- 2022–23 Second Men's League of Serbia (basketball)
- 2022–23 Radivoj Korać Cup
- 2022–23 Basketball Cup of Serbia
- 2022–23 ABA League First Division
- 2022–23 ABA League Second Division
- 2022–23 First Women's Basketball League of Serbia
- 2022–23 KK Crvena zvezda season
- 2022–23 KK Partizan season
