= 2022–23 Basketball Cup of Serbia =

2022–23 Cup of Serbia
- Season: 2022–23
- Duration: 20 December 2022 – 28 January 2023
- Games played: 7
- Teams: 8

Finals
- Champions: Spartak Office Shoes (1st title)
- Runners-up: Vojvodina
- Semifinalists: OKK Beograd; Zdravlje

The 2022–23 Basketball Cup of Serbia is the 17th season of the Serbian 2nd-tier men's cup tournament.

Finalists Spartak Office Shoes and Vojvodina got qualified for the 2023 Radivoj Korać Cup.

== Bracket ==
Quarterfinals
20 December 2022
Morava | 56
Spartak Office Shoes | 101
21 December 2022
Čačak 94 Quantox | 74
OKK Beograd | 84
21 December 2022
Zdravlje | 92
Mladost MaxBet | 82
21 December 2022
Sloboda | 66
Vojvodina | 71

Semifinals
11 January 2023
Spartak Office Shoes | 87
OKK Beograd | 63
11 January 2023
Zdravlje | 82
Vojvodina | 84

Final
28 January 2023
Spartak Office Shoes | 78
Vojvodina | 69

== Quarterfinals ==
All times are local UTC+1.

=== Morava v Spartak Office Shoes ===
20 December 2022
18:30

Boxscore

| Morava | 56–101 | Spartak Office Shoes |
Scoring by quarter: 18–26, 20–26, 5–24, 13–25
| Pts: N. Kostić, Prokić 12; Rebs: Aleksandar Miletić 10; Asts: Luka Tomašević 5 | | Pts: Aleksandar Ilkić 23; Rebs: Aleksandar Ilkić 9 Asts: Patrick Hardy Jr. 6 |

Vladičin Han Sports Hall, Vladičin Han
Attendance: 200
Referees: Stefan Zdravković, Milan Sibinović, B. Petković

=== Čačak 94 Quantox v OKK Beograd ===
21 December 2022
19:00

Boxscore

| Čačak 94 Quantox | 74–84 | OKK Beograd |
Scoring by quarter: 20–20, 15–22, 24–18, 15–24
| Pts: Trey Pulliam 13; Rebs: Nikola Radovanović 8 Asts: Nikola Radovanović 6 | | Pts: Stefan Miljenović 25; Rebs: Balaban, Samardziski 7 Asts: Nenad Miljenović 8 |

Borac Hall, Čačak
Attendance: 100
Referees: Ivan Stefanović, Duško Sedlar, Strahinja Dašić

=== Zdravlje v Mladost MaxBet ===
21 December 2022
17:00

Boxscore

| Zdravlje | 92–82 | Mladost MaxBet |
Scoring by quarter: 21–25, 21–18, 22–23, 28–16
| Pts: Noah Blackwell 23; Rebs: Milan Škundrić 11; Asts: Stojković, Duane 6 | | Pts: Jon Davis 21; Rebs: Marković, Opoku 6 Asts: Jon Davis 3 |

SRC Dubočica, Leskovac
Attendance: 350
Referees: Radoš Arsenijević, Vojkan Živković, Stefan Zdravković

=== Sloboda v Vojvodina ===
21 December 2022
18:00

Boxscore

| Sloboda | 66–71 | Vojvodina |
Scoring by quarter: 21–28, 17–13, 12–11, 16–19
| Pts: Nemanja Kapetanović 16; Rebs: Nekić, Aleksa Ilić 6 Asts: Nikola Ćirković 4 | | Pts: Luka Nedeljkov 28; Rebs: Dušan Beslać 7 Asts: Marko Ljubičić 5 |

Veliki Park Hall, Užice
Attendance: 550
Referees: Stefan Ćalić, Danilo Petković, S. Krstić

== Semifinals ==
All times are local UTC+1.

=== Spartak Office Shoes v OKK Beograd ===
11 January 2023
19:00

Boxscore

| Spartak Office Shoes | 87–63 | OKK Beograd |
Scoring by quarter: 18–13, 21–22, 22–13, 26–15
| Pts: Danilović, Hardy Jr. 20; Rebs: Patrick Hardy Jr. 8 Asts: Miloš Milisavljević 6 | | Pts: Boris Savović 20; Rebs: Timotej Malovec 6 Asts: Nenad Miljenović 4 |

Dudova Šuma Hall, Subotica
Attendance: 100
Referees: Vladimir Vesković, Marko Strika, Pavle Šipka

=== Zdravlje v Vojvodina ===
11 January 2023
16:30

Boxscore

| Zdravlje | 82–84 | Vojvodina |
Scoring by quarter: 18–18, 17–21, 22–26, 25–19
| Pts: Noah Blackwell 20; Rebs: Milan Škundrić 7 Asts: Strahinja Stojković 4 | | Pts: Nikola Gaćeša 27; Rebs: Dušan Beslać 5 Asts: Dušan Beslać 5 |

SRC Dubočica, Leskovac
Attendance: 1,100
Referees: Ivan Ilić, Ljubomir Marković, Stefan Zdravković

== Final ==
28 January 2023
19:00

Boxscore

| Spartak Office Shoes | 78–69 | Vojvodina |
Scoring by quarter: 12–15, 22–20, 27–18, 17–16
| Pts: Andrija Bojić 21; Rebs: Andrija Bojić 11; Asts: Milisavljević, Sokolović 4 | | Pts: Koča Jovović 11; Rebs: Stefan Šajin 5 Asts: Nikola Pešaković 6 |

Dudova Šuma Hall, Subotica
Attendance: 400
Referees: Marko Strika, Ljubomir Marković, Vladimir Tomić

== See also ==
- 2022–23 Radivoj Korać Cup
- 2022–23 Second Men's League of Serbia
- 2022–23 Basketball League of Serbia
