= 2021–22 Second Men's League of Serbia (basketball) =

Second League of Serbia
- Season: 2021–22
- Duration: September 2021 – April 2022
- Games played: 22 each
- Teams: 16

Finals
- Champions: Spartak Office Shoes
- Runners-up: Čačak 94

Statistical leaders
Points	(Serbia) Marko Čakarević	19.1
Rebounds	(Serbia) Predrag Radovanović	10.8
Assists	(Serbia) Petar Šparović	9.2
Index Rating	(Serbia) Marko Čakarević	28.6
- All statistics correct as of April 16, 2021.

The 2021–22 Second Men's League of Serbia is the 16th season of the Second Basketball League of Serbia, the 2nd-tier men's professional basketball league in Serbia.

== Teams ==
A total of 16 teams participated in the 2021–22 Second Men's League of Serbia, divided into two geographical groups with 8 clubs.

In August 2021, the Basketball Federation of Serbia confirmed a disaffiliation of Fair Play and their merge into Spartak. Spartak took the Fair Play's spot for the 2021–22 season.

=== Promotion and relegation ===
Incoming	Outgoing
Relegated from the First League (1st-tier); Napredak Metalka Majur; Pirot	Promoted to the First League (1st-tier); Zdravlje Leskovac; Slodes
Promoted from the First Regional League (3rd-tier); Hercegovac; Žitko Basket; Čačak 94; Radnik	Relegated to the First Regional League (3rd-tier); Radnički; Bor RTB; Sveti Đorđe; Vrbas

=== Venues and locations ===
Location of teams in the 2021–22 season

Team	City	Arena	Capacity
Beovuk 72	Belgrade	SC Šumice	2,000
Borac Zemun	Belgrade	Pinki Hall	2,000
Čačak 94	Čačak	Borac Hall	4,000
Hercegovac	Gajdobra	Gajdobra Sports Hall	—
Klik	Arilje	Arilje Sports Hall	—
Konstantin	Niš	Čair Sports Center	4,000
Mladost SP	Smederevska Palanka	Vuk Karadžić School Hall	500
Napredak Metalka Majur	Aleksinac	Aleksinac Sports Hall	1,400
Napredak Junior	Kruševac	Kruševac Sports Hall	2,500
Pirot	Pirot	Pirot Kej Hall	835
Proleter Naftagas	Zrenjanin	Crystal Hall	3,000
Radnik	Surdulica	Surdulica Sports Hall	800
Spartak Office Shoes	Subotica	SC Dudova Šuma	3,000
Star	Novi Sad	SPC Vojvodina	1,030
Železničar	Čačak	Borac Hall	4,000
Žitko Basket	Belgrade	Master Sport Center	750

=== Head coaches ===
Team	Head coach	Coaching changes
Beovuk 72	(Serbia) Rajko Mirković	Nikola Stanić
Borac Zemun	(Serbia) Pavle Trifunović	Vedran Popović (until Aug 2021); Siniša Matić (until Mar 2022)
Čačak 94	(Serbia) Zoran Stefanović	—
Hercegovac	(Serbia) Radomir Kisić	—
Klik	(Serbia) Branko Jorović	Miljan Marjanović
Konstantin	(Serbia) Ljubiša Damjanović	—
Mladost SP	(Serbia) Ivan Stefanović	Zlatan Rakić
Napredak Metalka Majur	(Serbia) Slaviša Bogavac	Dušan Jelić
Napredak Junior	(Serbia) Marko Cvetković	—
Pirot	(Serbia) Zoran Milovanović	Filip Socek (until Aug 2021)
Proleter Naftagas	(Serbia) Stefan Atanacković	—
Radnik	(Serbia) Perica Mitić	—
Spartak Office Shoes	(Serbia) Srećko Sekulović	Deni Katanić, Filip Socek (until Nov 2021)
Star	(Serbia) Aleksandar Komnenić	Dimitrije Živković
Železničar	(Serbia) Aleksandar Bjelić	—
Žitko Basket	(Serbia) Marko Boras	—

== Regular season ==
=== Group A ===
Pos	Team	Pld	W	L	PF	PA	PD	Pts	Qualification or relegation
1	Železničar	14	11	3	1095	971	+124	25	Qualification to Playoff
2	Borac Zemun	14	10	4	1105	1014	+91	24	Qualification to Playoff
3	Hercegovac	14	9	5	1121	1105	+16	23	Qualification to Playoff
4	Radnik	14	7	7	1166	1154	+12	21	Qualification to Playoff
5	Klik	14	6	8	1109	1148	−39	20	Qualification to Playout
6	Star	14	6	8	1048	1092	−44	20	Qualification to Playout
7	Napredak Metalka Majur	14	4	10	1057	1126	−69	18	Qualification to Playout
8	Konstantin	14	3	11	1040	1131	−91	17	Qualification to Playout

Source: SrbijaSport

=== Group B ===
Pos	Team	Pld	W	L	PF	PA	PD	Pts	Qualification or relegation
1	Spartak Office Shoes	14	12	2	1202	974	+228	26	Qualification to Playoff
2	Čačak 94	14	11	3	1110	978	+132	25	Qualification to Playoff
3	Pirot	14	11	3	1118	1057	+61	25	Qualification to Playoff
4	Mladost SP	14	7	7	1056	1058	−2	21	Qualification to Playoff
5	Žitko Basket	14	6	8	1099	1129	−30	20	Qualification to Playout
6	Proleter Naftagas	14	5	9	945	1080	−135	19	Qualification to Playout
7	Napredak Junior	14	3	11	940	1021	−81	17	Qualification to Playout
8	Beovuk 72	14	1	13	914	1087	−173	15	Qualification to Playout

Source: SrbijaSport

== Post-season ==
=== Playoff ===
Pos	Team	Pld	W	L	PF	PA	PD	Pts	Qualification or relegation
1	Spartak Office Shoes	14	12	2	1311	1074	+237	26	Qualification to First League
2	Čačak 94	14	11	3	1164	1053	+111	25	Qualification to First League
3	Pirot	14	9	5	1130	1113	+17	23	
4	Mladost SP	14	7	7	1099	1114	−15	21	
5	Železničar	14	5	9	1029	1074	−45	19	
6	Borac Zemun	14	5	9	1139	1164	−25	19	
7	Radnik	14	4	10	1154	1262	−108	18	
8	Hercegovac	14	3	11	1059	1231	−172	17	

Source: SrbijaSport, KSS

=== Playout ===
Pos	Team	Pld	W	L	PF	PA	PD	Pts	Qualification or relegation
1	Star	14	9	5	1121	1081	+40	23	
2	Napredak Metalka Majur	14	9	5	1169	1114	+55	23	
3	Žitko Basket	14	9	5	1104	1074	+30	23	
4	Klik	14	8	6	1156	1094	+62	22	
5	Konstantin	14	8	6	1100	1080	+20	22	Relegation to Regional Leagues
6	Proleter Naftagas	14	6	8	1030	1075	−45	20	Relegation to Regional Leagues
7	Napredak Junior	14	5	9	995	1046	−51	19	Relegation to Regional Leagues
8	Beovuk 72	14	2	12	1034	1145	−111	16	Relegation to Regional Leagues

Source: SrbijaSport, KSS

== See also ==
- 2021–22 Basketball League of Serbia
- 2021–22 Basketball Cup of Serbia
