= Jorović =

Jorović (Serbian Cyrillic: Јоровић) is a Serbian surname. Notable people with the surname include:

- Branko Jorović (born 1981), Serbian basketball coach and former player
- Ivana Jorović (born 1997), Serbian tennis player
