= Vladimir Androić =

Serbian basketball coach (born 1957)

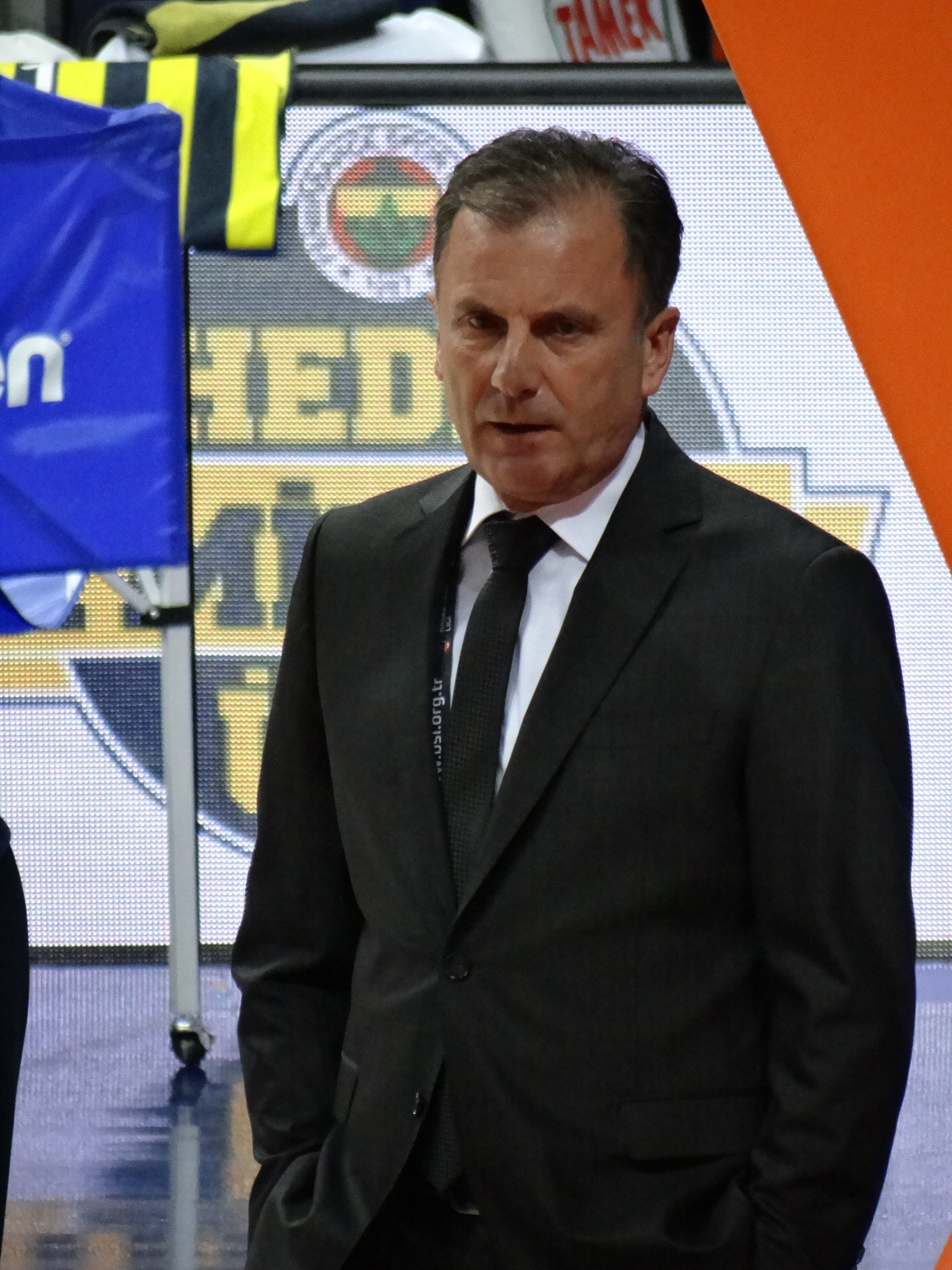
- Androić with Fenerbahçe in 2018

Panathinaikos
- Title: Assistant coach
- League: Greek Basketball League; EuroLeague

Personal information
- Born: 30 July 1957 (age 69) Čačak, PR Serbia, Yugoslavia
- Listed height: 1.82 m (6 ft 0 in)

Career information
- NBA draft: 1979: undrafted
- Playing career: 1975–1990
- Position: Point guard
- Number: 4, 11
- Coaching career: 1990–present

Career history

Playing
- 1975–1977: Železničar Čačak
- 1978–1984: Borac Čačak
- 1984–1985: Šibenka
- 1985–1989: Borac Čačak
- 1989–1990: Partizan

Coaching
- 1990–1992: Borac Čačak (assistant)
- 1992–1993: Borac Čačak
- Mašinac
- Mladost Čačak
- Achilleas Kaimakli
- 2008–2009: Lokomotiv Rostov (assistant)
- Napredak Kruševac
- 2011: Zagreb (assistant)
- 2011–2012: Zagreb
- 2013–2020: Fenerbahçe (assistant)
- 2021–2025: Partizan (assistant)
- 2026–present: Panathinaikos (assistant)

Career highlights
- As assistant coach: EuroLeague champion (2017); 4× Turkish League champion (2014, 2016–2018); 3× Turkish Cup winner (2016, 2019, 2020); 3× Turkish Supercup winner (2013, 2016, 2017); 2× ABA League champion (2023, 2025); Serbian League champion (2025)

Vladimir Androić (Serbian Cyrillic: Владимир Андроић; born 30 July 1957) is a Serbian professional basketball coach and former professional player who is currently an assistant coach for Panathinaikos of the Greek Basketball League (GBL) and the EuroLeague.

== Playing career ==
A point guard, Androić played in Yugoslavia from 1975 to 1990 for Železničar Čačak, Borac Čačak, Šibenka, and Partizan. He retired as a player with Partizan in 1990.

== Coaching career ==
After retirement in 1990, Androić joined a coaching staff of Borac Čačak under Ratko Joksić as an assistant coach. After two years as the assistant coach, Androić got promoted as the new head coach of Borac. Later, he coached Mašinac and Mladost Čačak. Also, he coached teams in Cyprus and Russia (Lokomotiv Rostov).

On 14 October 2011, Zagreb hired Androić as their new head coach. On 29 March 2012, Zagreb parted ways with him.

In August 2013, Fenerbahçe head coach Željko Obradović added Androić to his coaching staff as an assistant. Androić left Fenerbahçe following the departure of Obradović after the end of the 2019–20 season.

In August 2021, Androić was named an assistant coach for Partizan under Željko Obradović.

== Career achievements ==
As assistant coach

- EuroLeague champion: 1 (with Fenerbahçe: 2016–17)
- Turkish League champion: 4 (with Fenerbahçe: 2013–14, 2015–16, 2016–17, 2017–18)
- Turkish Cup winner: 3 (with Fenerbahçe: 2016, 2019, 2020)
- Turkish Super Cup winner: 3 (with Fenerbahçe: 2013, 2016, 2017)
- Adriatic League champion: 2 (with Partizan: 2022–23, 2024–25)
- Serbian League champion: 1 (with Partizan: 2024–25)

== Personal life ==
His father Borislav Androić was born in Petrova Gora, a village near Lobor, in present-day Croatia. As a military analyst of the Yugoslav People's Army, Borislav moved to Čačak prior Vladimir was born and there he met Vladimir's mother.

Androić served as the best man at the wedding of basketball coach Željko Obradović.
