= Filip Dumić =

Serbian basketball player (born 1990)

No. 4 – Radnički Kragujevac
- Position: Point guard
- League: Basketball League of Serbia

Personal information
- Born: October 8, 1990 (age 36) Čačak, Serbia, Yugoslavia
- Listed height: 5 ft 10 in (1.78 m)
- Listed weight: 190 lb (86 kg)

Career information
- NBA draft: 2012: undrafted
- Playing career: 2008–present

Career history
- 2008–2012: Mladost Čačak
- 2012–2013: OKK Konstantin
- 2013–2015: Borac Čačak
- 2015: Jedinstvo Bijelo Polje
- 2015: Vršac
- 2015–2016: Tamiš
- 2016: Sloga
- 2017: Mladost Mrkonjić Grad
- 2018: Timba Timișoara
- 2018–2019: Kumanovo
- 2019–2020: Pelister
- 2020–present: Radnički Kragujevac

Filip Dumić (born October 8, 1990) is a Serbian professional basketball player who plays for KK Čačak 94 of the Basketball League of Serbia.

== Professional career ==
On August 17, 2013, he signed with Borac Čačak. On January 22, 2018, Dumić signed with Romanian basketball club Timba Timișoara. On September 11, 2018, he signed with Macedonian basketball club Kumanovo.
