= Bogdan Bogdanović (basketball) =

Serbian basketball player (born 1992)

Bogdan Bogdanović Богдан Богдановић
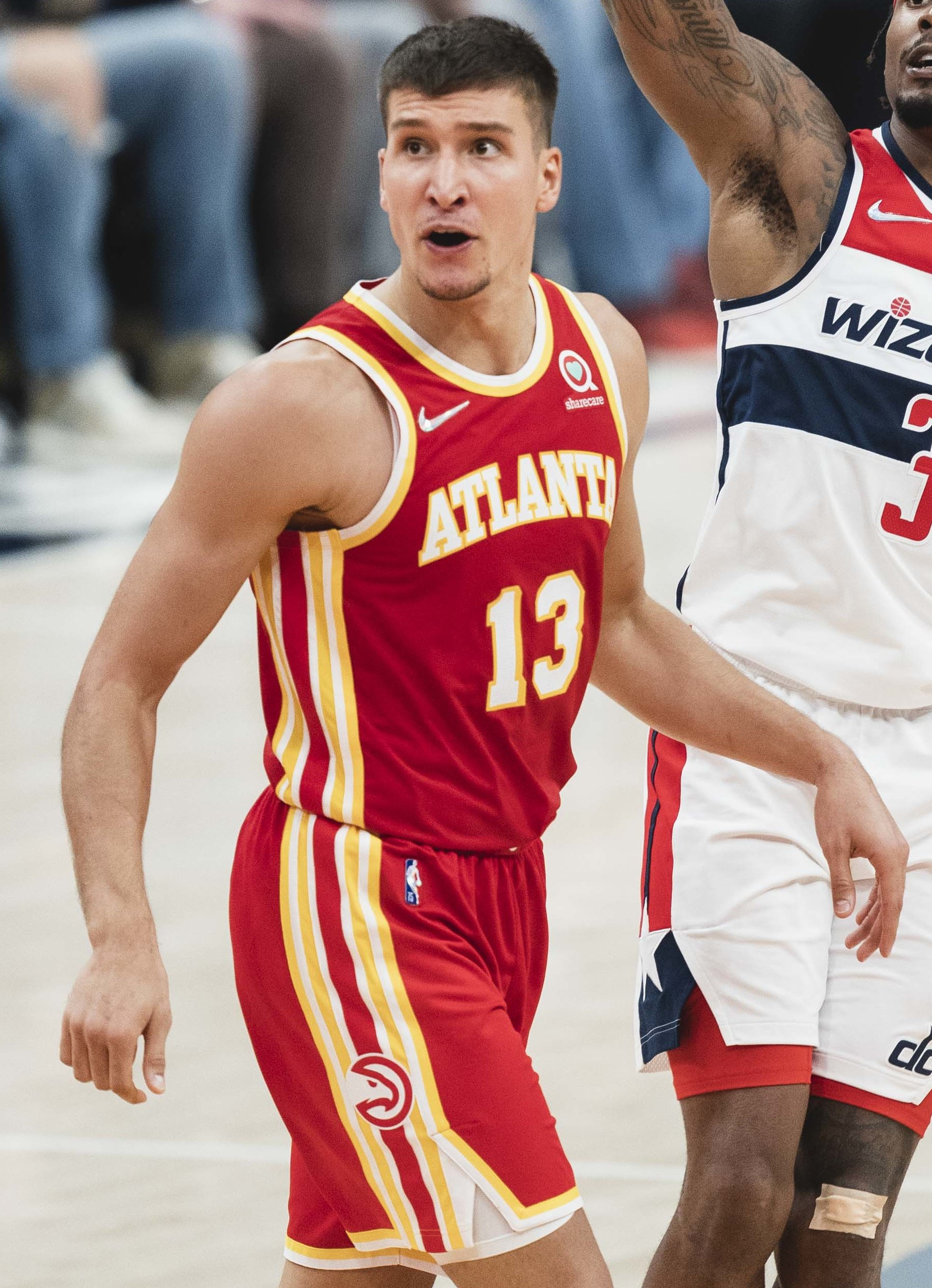
- Bogdanović with the Atlanta Hawks in 2021

No. 31 – Houston Rockets
- Position: Shooting guard
- League: NBA

Personal information
- Born: 18 August 1992 (age 34) Belgrade, Serbia, FR Yugoslavia
- Listed height: 6 ft 5 in (1.96 m)
- Listed weight: 231 lb (105 kg)

Career information
- NBA draft: 2014: 1st round, 27th overall pick
- Drafted by: Phoenix Suns
- Playing career: 2010–present

Career history
- 2010–2014: Partizan
- 2014–2017: Fenerbahçe
- 2017–2020: Sacramento Kings
- 2020–2025: Atlanta Hawks
- 2025–2026: Los Angeles Clippers
- 2026–present: Houston Rockets

Career highlights
- NBA All-Rookie Second Team (2018); EuroLeague champion (2017); All-EuroLeague First Team (2017); 2× EuroLeague Rising Star (2014, 2015); EuroLeague 2010–2020 All-Decade Team (2020); EuroLeague 25th Anniversary Team (2025); 2× Turkish League champion (2016, 2017); 2× ABA League champion (2011, 2013); 4× Serbian League champion (2011–2014); Turkish Cup winner (2016); 2× Serbian Cup winner (2011, 2012); Turkish Super Cup winner (2016); Turkish League Finals MVP (2017); Serbian League Playoffs MVP (2014); All-ABA League Team (2014); 3× Serbian Player of the Year (2017, 2019, 2023); Turkish Cup Final MVP (2016)
- Stats at NBA.com
- Stats at Basketball Reference
Medals
Men's basketball
Representing Serbia
Olympic Games
Silver medal – second place	2016 Rio de Janeiro	Team
Bronze medal – third place	2024 Paris	Team
World Cup
Silver medal – second place	2014 Spain
Silver medal – second place	2023 Philippines–Japan–Indonesia
EuroBasket
Silver medal – second place	2017 Finland–Israel–Romania–Turkey
U19 World Championship
Silver medal – second place	2011 Latvia	Team

Bogdan Bogdanović (Serbian Cyrillic: Богдан Богдановић; born 18 August 1992) is a Serbian professional basketball player for the Houston Rockets of the National Basketball Association (NBA). He also represents the Serbian national team.

He was selected by the Phoenix Suns with the 27th overall pick in the 2014 NBA draft, with his draft rights being traded to the Sacramento Kings during the 2016 NBA draft. Bogdanović earned an All-EuroLeague First Team, a All-FIBA EuroBasket Team and was selected two times to the All-FIBA World Cup First Team. He helped Serbia win the bronze medal and was named to the FIBA Olympics All-Second Team at 2024 Summer Olympics in Paris. He is the all-time leading scorer for Serbia.

== Early life, family and education ==
Bogdan Bogdanović was born in Serbia to parents Dragan and Koviljka. He grew up in Belgrade, and his father was a volleyball coach.

He has a sister named Ivana. He is related to the late Serbian architect Bogdan Bogdanović, sharing the same name.

== Early career ==
Bogdanović began playing organized basketball with ŠKK Zvezdara, a club in Belgrade. In April 2008, he moved on to Žitko Basket (then known as Alimenti Basket), also from Belgrade. Playing with Žitko Basket under coach Dragan Jakovljević, Bogdanović was part of the team that in April 2010 earned third place in the 2009–10 Junior Serbian League at the final eight tournament in Vršac, after beating Partizan juniors in the quarterfinal, losing 89–86 to Hemofarm juniors in the semifinal and beating FMP junior team 82–76 in the third place game.

A few weeks later in May 2010, together with another Žitko player Luka Pajković, Bogdanović got attached to FMP's junior team featuring Nenad Miljenović, Stefan Popovski-Turanjanin, Nemanja Bezbradica, Nikola Janković, and Nikola Silađi for the Nike International Junior Tournament (NIJT) in Paris where the FMP juniors were defending their club's double title from the previous two years. They were drawn in one of two round-robin groups at the tournament, alongside KK Split, Treviso, and Málaga. After beating Treviso and Split, FMP required a win over Málaga juniors to win their group and make the final; with precisely Bogdanović making the difference with an off-balance buzzer-beater for a 79–78 final score, two of his 21 points on the day alongside 6 rebounds. In the final game FMP took on INSEP and lost 73–83 with Bogdanović having an outing to forget due to the mid-game injury that forced him to leave the contest.

== Professional career ==
=== Partizan (2010–2014) ===
In September 2010, 18-year-old Bogdanović signed his first professional contract with Partizan. Initially, in his first two seasons with the crno-beli, under head coach Vlada Jovanović, Bogdanović didn't play much.

With the summer 2012 return of head coach Duško Vujošević to Partizan, 20-year-old Bogdanović began to see increased minutes. After Danilo Anđušić's departure in December 2012, Bogdanović's role in the team stabilized even more. The 2012–13 season saw him make his EuroLeague debut with the team, averaging 5 points per game and 1.8 rebounds per game over 6 appearances.

After being called up for the Serbian national team during summer 2013, he earned greater trust from coach Vujošević, reflected in increased playing time and bigger team role in the 2013–14 season.

In the EuroLeague victory over CSKA Moscow in Belgrade, Bogdanović scored a career-high 27 points, shooting 10 for 16 from the field. Shortly after the game, he was praised by Serbian national team selector Aleksandar Đorđević, as being one of the most promising young European players.

In a February ABA League away game versus Cibona, Bogdanović scored a career-high 32 points, also adding 4 rebounds and 5 assists. Over 23 games in the EuroLeague, he averaged 14.8 points, 3.7 rebounds and 3.7 assists per game, all career-highs. In April 2014, along with his teammate Joffrey Lauvergne, he was selected to the Ideal Team of the ABA League.

In May 2014, he was voted the EuroLeague Rising Star of the season, by the head coaches of 24 EuroLeague teams.

Partizan finished the season by winning its 13th consecutive Serbian League title, after once again defeating their archrivals, Red Star Belgrade, 3–1 in the league's finals series. Bogdanović exploded in the finals series, averaging 30.8 points, 4.8 rebounds, and 4.2 assists per game. For such a performance, he was named the league's Finals MVP.

Following Bogdanović's summer 2014 transfer from Partizan to Fenerbahce, the player's decision to leave the club was publicly criticized by Partizan's head coach Vujošević who claimed that by leaving in 2014 Bogdanović broke their verbal agreement the coach had struck with the player (along with Bogdanović's parents and agent Aleksandar Rašković) two years earlier in 2012. Their 2012 agreement, according to the coach, saw then 20-year-old Bogdanović be placed immediately into Partizan's first team rotation in return for the player's promise he would stay with the team three more seasons from that point on. Following Partizan's failure to qualify for the next season's EuroLeague, Bogdanović left the club in summer 2014—two years after the supposed agreement thus one year short of the 3-year commitment.

=== Fenerbahçe (2014–2017) ===
On 11 July 2014, Bogdanović officially signed a four-year contract, containing opt-out clauses after the second and third seasons, with the Turkish team Fenerbahçe. Over four years, Bogdanović is slated to make €3.5 million euros net income, while Partizan also received a €1.3 million buyout from Fenerbahçe, as the player was still under contract with the Belgrade club.

==== 2014–15 season ====
Even though Bogdanović was a newcomer in the team, head coach Željko Obradović gave him a significant number of minutes and a starter role. With the beginning of the 2014–15 season, he struggled in shooting and consistency. On 15 November, in a 93–86 win over FC Bayern Munich, he scored 18 points and added 7 assists, his best game since coming to the new team. Over 10 games in the first phase of the EuroLeague, he averaged 10.4 points and 3.4 assists per game. On 20 March, Bogdanović set a season-high of 25 points, and added 4 assists, in a 98–77 win over Emporio Armani Milano. For such a performance, he was named the EuroLeague MVP of the Round, with a Performance Index Rating of 32. On 26 March, in a game against Unicaja Málaga, he scored a 20-meter distance buzzer beater at the end of the second quarter. After good showings in the Top 16, he struggled in shooting in the quarter-final playoff series against Maccabi Tel Aviv, averaging 8 points on 25% shooting from the field. Eventually, Fenerbahçe won the EuroLeague playoff series, and advanced to the 2015 Euroleague Final Four, the first in the club's history.

On 7 May, he was voted the EuroLeague Rising Star for the second season in a row, becoming only the second player, after Nikola Mirotić, to win the award twice. On 15 May 2015, however, his team lost in the EuroLeague semifinal game to Real Madrid, by a score of 87–96. Eventually, Fenerbahçe finished in 4th place in the EuroLeague, after losing in the third-place game to CSKA Moscow, by a score of 80–86. Over the season, in 29 EuroLeague games, Bogdanović averaged 10.6 points, 2.9 rebounds, and 2.8 assists per game. Also, in 36 games of the Turkish League, he averaged 11.5 points, 3.1 rebounds, and 2.4 assists.

==== 2015–16 season ====
Throughout his second season with the team, Bogdanović continued with his good performances, becoming one of the team's leaders. Occasionally, in the late phases of the games, he also had the ball in his hands. Fenerbahçe won the Turkish Cup, with a 67–65 win over Darüşşafaka, with Bogdanović being named the Cup MVP. Fenerbahçe also reached the final game of the 2016 Euroleague Final Four, but fell short of winning the EuroLeague championship, after an overtime 96–101 loss to CSKA Moscow. Over 28 EuroLeague games, he averaged 11.7 points, 3.3 rebounds, and 3 assists per game. At the end of the season, Fenerbahçe won the Turkish League championship.

==== 2016–17 season ====
On 26 October 2016, in a EuroLeague game against Žalgiris Kaunas, Bogdanović sprained his right ankle; at first it was estimated that he will need two to three weeks of recovery time, but recovery didn't seem to go as expected as he didn't return until January 2017. On 6 January 2017, he returned on the court, in a game against Milano. Bogdanović proved to be a major contributor for Fenerbahçe in the EuroLeague playoffs, as he would be the team's leading scorer in their first two games against Panathinaikos, before his club ultimately swept them, to earn another EuroLeague Final Four appearance. As a result of his contributions, he was not only named the EuroLeague's Player of the Round during those first two playoff games, but he was also named the EuroLeague's Player of the Month, for his overall work that month. He later helped Fenerbahçe repeat their place in the Finals of the EuroLeague, after helping them defeat Real Madrid, in the EuroLeague Final Four semifinals, by a score of 84–75. He had 14 points and 6 rebounds against Real Madrid. Two days later, Bogdanović would help the club win their first ever EuroLeague championship, as they beat out Olympiacos, by a score of 80–64, in the championship game. Afterwards, Bogdanović would lead Fenerbahçe to its second straight Turkish Super League Finals victory, by sweeping Beşiktaş Sompo Japan, and winning the Turkish Super League Finals MVP award in the process.

In 2020, he was named to the EuroLeague 2010–20 All-Decade Team.

=== Sacramento Kings (2017–2020) ===
On 26 June 2014, while playing for Partizan Belgrade, Bogdanović was selected by the Phoenix Suns with the 27th overall pick in the 2014 NBA draft. On 23 June 2016, on the night of the 2016 NBA draft, the Suns traded his rights to the Sacramento Kings along with Georgios Papagiannis, Skal Labissière and the Detroit Pistons' 2020 second-round pick, in exchange for the draft rights of Marquese Chriss.

On 13 July 2017, Bogdanović signed a three-year, $27 million contract with the Sacramento Kings. He made his NBA debut on 23 October 2017, against the team that originally drafted him, the Phoenix Suns. Bogdanović recorded 12 points, 3 rebounds, and 2 assists in 25 minutes of play off the bench as the Kings lost 117–115.

Bogdanović was selected as a member of the Team World for the 2018 Rising Stars Challenge. He led Team World to a 155–124 win over Team USA with 26 points, 6 assists and 4 rebounds, while shooting 7 of 13 from the three-point line and was named the MVP of the game. The Sacramento Kings finished the season with a 27–55 record, thus failing to qualify to the NBA playoffs for the twelfth season in a row. Bogdanović in his first NBA season had the averages of 11.8 points, 3.3 assists and 2.9 rebounds over 78 games.

After the end of the season, he had an MRI procedure that revealed a slight tear of the medial meniscus in his left knee. On 24 April 2018, he underwent a meniscus debridement surgery in order to fully recover his left knee. On 22 May 2018, he was named to the NBA All-Rookie Second Team.

Bogdanović was selected as a member of the Team World for the 2019 Rising Stars Challenge. After missing the first ten games due to an injury rehab, in his sophomore season with the club Bogdanović mainly played the role of sixth man and second unit leader. Over 70 games, he averaged career-highs of 14.1 points, 3.8 assists and 3.5 rebounds.

In his contract year with the club, Bogdanović averaged 15.1 points, 3.4 assists and 3.4 rebounds over 61 games. The 2019–20 NBA season was suspended in March as a result of COVID-19 pandemic and Sacramento Kings were invited for 22-team 2020 NBA Bubble. Eventually, they did not manage to qualify for the playoffs and finished the season with 31–41 record.

=== Atlanta Hawks (2020–2025) ===
In November 2020, the Kings attempted to sign-and-trade Bogdanović to the Milwaukee Bucks along with Justin James for Donte DiVincenzo, D. J. Wilson, and Ersan İlyasova. The trade unraveled when it was announced that the NBA was investigating the Bucks for having contact with Bogdanović and/or his agent before it was allowed under free agency rules. The Bucks reportedly felt double-crossed by the situation, decided not to pursue the trade further, and were stripped of their 2022 second-round draft pick at the conclusion of the investigation in December. According to Bogdanović, he was not made aware of the trade by the Kings and felt betrayed by the organization.

On 24 November 2020, Bogdanović signed a four-year, $72 million contract with the Atlanta Hawks. Bogdanović would only play in 44 games during the 2020–21 regular season due to injuries, but set new career highs, averaging 16.4 points per game and shot 90.9% on free throws. Coincidentally, the Hawks faced the Bucks in the 2021 Eastern Conference Finals, which the Bucks won in six games before winning the NBA championship.

After the 2021–22 season ended, Bogdanović underwent right knee surgery and was ruled out for at least three months. On 16 March 2023, he signed a four-year, $68 million contract extension with the Hawks.

On 11 December 2023, Bogdanović put up a career-high 40 points on 10 three-pointers made in a 129–122 loss to the Denver Nuggets. He also became the first player in Hawks history to put up at least 40 points and 10 three-pointers made in a game.

On 23 October 2024, he was sidelined for a month with a right hamstring tendinopathy during a game against the Brooklyn Nets.

=== Los Angeles Clippers (2025–2026) ===
On 6 February 2025, Bogdanović was traded to the Los Angeles Clippers alongside three future second-round picks in exchange for Terance Mann and Bones Hyland.

=== Houston Rockets (2026–present) ===
On 8 July 2026, Bogdanović signed a one-year, $3.9 million contract with the Houston Rockets. On 21 October, he made his Rockets debut, recording five points and two assists in a 128–110 win over the Dallas Mavericks.

== National team career ==
=== Junior national team ===
Bogdanović's play with Žitko got him a training camp invite ahead of the 2009 FIBA Europe Under-18 Championship in France, however he was quickly cut by head coach Vlada Jovanović since he was about to turn 17 at that time.

In the summer of 2010, Bogdanović was selected to represent Serbia by head coach Jovanović for the European under-18 Championship wherein they finished fourth in the tournament.

The following year, Bogdanović, while still with Partizan at the club level, was selected to play for Serbia's Under-19 national team under head coach Dejan Mijatović at the 2011 FIBA Under-19 World Championship in Latvia. Playing alongside Aleksandar Cvetković, Đorđe Drenovac, Luka Mitrović, Nemanja Dangubić, and Nemanja Bešović, they finished as a runner-up against a Jonas Valančiūnas-led Lithuanian team. Bogdanović averaged 8.9 points and 5 rebounds per game for the tournament.

=== Senior national team ===
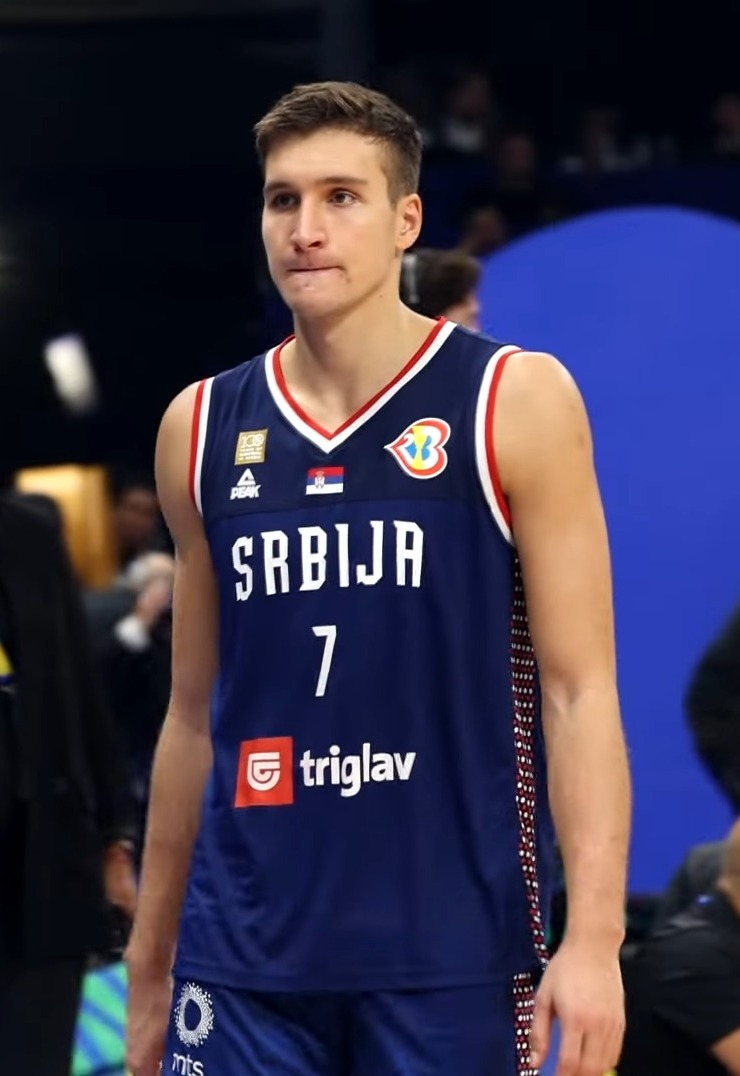
Bogdanović with the Serbian national basketball team at the 2023 FIBA Basketball World Cup

In the EuroBasket 2013 in Slovenia, Bogdanović represented the senior Serbian national team, averaging 9.4 points, 4.3 rebounds, and 2 assists per game. Bogdanović was a member of the Serbian national basketball team that won the silver medal at the 2014 FIBA Basketball World Cup, under head coach Aleksandar Đorđević. He emerged in the knockout phase against Greece, Brazil, and France, and ended the tournament with averages of 12 points, 2.4 rebounds, and 2.8 assists per game, on 47% shooting.

In the last few pre-tournament friendly games for the EuroBasket 2015, Serbian team head coach Đorđević put Bogdanović on the bench due to the twenty-three-year-old player's persistent back injury problems. Despite that, he was named to the 12-man roster that represented Serbia at the EuroBasket. Throughout the first phase of the tournament, playing with pain injections, he saw limited minutes, and his production slightly decreased from the previous summer. Despite that, Serbia dominated in the tournament's toughest group, Group B, with a 5–0 record, and then eliminated Finland and Czech Republic in the round of 16 and quarterfinal games, respectively. However, they were stopped in the semifinal game by Lithuania, with a score of 67–64, and eventually lost to the tournament's host team, France, in the bronze-medal game, with a score of 81–68. Over 9 tournament games, Bogdanović averaged 8.9 points, 3.2 rebounds, and 3.2 assists per game, on 39.7% shooting from the field, and 27.1% shooting from the three-point line.

Bogdanović also represented Serbia at the 2016 Summer Olympics where they won the silver medal, after losing to the United States in the final game with 96–66.

Bogdanović also represented Serbia at the EuroBasket 2017 where they won the silver medal, after losing in the final game to Slovenia. With the absence of long-time team captain and leader Miloš Teodosić due to injury, Bogdanović stepped in as the team's leader. Over 9 tournament games, he averaged 20.4 points, 3.4 rebounds and 5 assists per game, on 47.4% overall field goal shooting. He was named All-Tournament Team.

At the 2019 FIBA Basketball World Cup, the national team of Serbia was dubbed as favorite to win the trophy, but was eventually upset in the quarterfinals by Argentina. With wins over the United States and Czech Republic, it finished in fifth place. Bogdanović was once again the best player in the team, averaging 22.9 points, 4.1 rebounds and 4.4 assists over 8 games, while shooting 55.6% from the field and 53% from the three-point line. For his performances, he was selected to the FIBA Basketball World Cup All-Tournament Team. With 183 points scored throughout the tournament, he was the FIBA Basketball World Cup Top Scorer by total points scored.

Bogdanović missed the EuroBasket 2022 due to a right knee surgery.

Bogdanović won silver medal at the 2023 FIBA Basketball World Cup with the Serbia national team. He averaged 19.1 points, 4.6 rebounds, 3.3 assists, and 2.1 steals per game. In recognition of his individual play, Bogdanović was named second time in a row to the World Cup All-Tournament Team.

He played with Serbia at the 2024 Olympics in Paris, and led the team with 30 points in the third group stage game against South Sudan, surpassing Miloš Teodosić to become Serbia's all-time leading scorer in all competitions by scoring his 1,058th career point. His 30-point performance also set an Olympic record for a Serbian player. He won the bronze medal at the 2024 Summer Olympics with Serbia. Over 6 tournament games, Bogdanović averaged 18.3 points, 3.8 assists and 4 rebounds, while shooting 47.6 percent from the field, 46.2 percent from three-point range, and 92.3 percent from the free throw line. For his performances, Bogdanović was named to the tournament's All-Second Team.

Bogdanović was once again selected for the EuroBasket 2025. He suffered a hamstring injury in the second group stage game against Portugal, which later ruled him out for the remainder of the tournament.

== Career statistics ==
Legend
GP	Games played	GS	Games started	MPG	Minutes per game
FG%	Field-goal percentage	3P%	3-point field-goal percentage	FT%	Free-throw percentage
RPG	Rebounds per game	APG	Assists per game	SPG	Steals per game
BPG	Blocks per game	PPG	Points per game	PIR	Performance index rating
**Bold**	Career high

=== NBA ===
==== Regular season ====
Year	Team	GP	GS	MPG	FG%	3P%	FT%	RPG	APG	SPG	BPG	PPG
2017–18	Sacramento	78	**52**	27.9	.446	.392	.840	2.9	3.3	.9	.2	11.8
2018–19	Sacramento	70	17	27.8	.418	.360	.827	3.5	**3.8**	1.0	.2	14.1
2019–20	Sacramento	61	28	28.9	.440	.372	.741	3.4	3.4	1.0	.2	15.1
2020–21	Atlanta	44	27	29.7	.473	**.438**	.909	3.6	3.3	1.1	**.3**	16.4
2021–22	Atlanta	63	27	29.3	.431	.368	.843	**4.0**	3.1	1.1	.2	15.1
2022–23	Atlanta	54	9	27.9	.447	.406	.813	3.1	2.8	.8	**.3**	14.0
2023–24	Atlanta	**79**	33	**30.4**	.428	.374	**.921**	3.4	3.1	**1.2**	**.3**	**16.9**
2024–25	Atlanta	24	0	24.9	.371	.301	.882	2.8	2.0	.8	**.3**	10.0
2024–25	L.A. Clippers	30	4	25.0	**.474**	.427	.875	3.1	3.2	.7	.2	11.4
2025–26	L.A. Clippers	23	3	19.7	.388	.347	.800	2.6	2.2	.4	.1	7.4
Career		526	200	28.0	.436	.381	.845	3.3	3.2	1.0	.2	14.0

==== Playoffs ====
Year	Team	GP	GS	MPG	FG%	3P%	FT%	RPG	APG	SPG	BPG	PPG
2021	Atlanta	**18**	**18**	**33.2**	.390	.329	.706	4.2	2.9	**1.6**	.3	14.1
2022	Atlanta	4	0	26.7	.408	.346	.800	**4.8**	**3.0**	.3	.3	**14.3**
2023	Atlanta	6	1	26.1	**.556**	**.455**	.714	3.0	2.5	1.0	**.8**	13.3
2025	L.A. Clippers	7	0	16.7	.364	.292	**.857**	2.9	2.1	.4	.0	6.4
Career		35	19	28.0	.412	.345	.756	3.8	2.7	1.1	.3	12.4

=== EuroLeague ===
†	Denotes seasons in which Bogdanović won the EuroLeague

Year	Team	GP	GS	MPG	FG%	3P%	FT%	RPG	APG	SPG	BPG	PPG	PIR
2012–13	Partizan	6	3	17.6	.333	.200	.800	1.8	1.0	.7	—	5.0	3.7
2013–14	Partizan	23	18	**31.4**	.401	.370	.754	3.7	**3.7**	**1.6**	.2	**14.8**	12.7
2014–15	Fenerbahçe	**29**	**27**	28.3	.395	.358	.797	2.9	2.8	.7	.3	10.6	10.0
2015–16	Fenerbahçe	28	24	27.6	.411	.370	.797	3.3	3.0	1.0	**.4**	11.7	12.5
2016–17†	Fenerbahçe	22	17	27.9	**.500**	**.430**	**.855**	**3.8**	3.6	1.1	.3	14.6	**16.7**
Career		108	89	28.1	.419	.376	.801	3.3	3.1	1.1	.3	12.3	12.2

== Personal life ==
He is a fan of the World of Warcraft series of video games. On 10 April 2016, fans of Fenerbahçe named a star after Bogdan Bogdanović.

== See also ==
- List of Olympic medalists in basketball
- List of Serbian NBA players
