= Ivan Saičić =

Serbian basketball player

Radnik Surdulica
- Position: Small forward
- League: Second League of Serbia

Personal information
- Born: 8 February 1993 (age 33) Belgrade, Serbia, FR Yugoslavia
- Listed height: 2.01 m (6 ft 7 in)
- Listed weight: 98 kg (216 lb)

Career information
- College: Winthrop (2013–2014); West Georgia (2015–2017); Oklahoma City (2017–2018)
- NBA draft: 2018: undrafted
- Playing career: 2011–present

Career history
- 2011: Crvena zvezda
- 2012–2013: Vršac
- 2018: OKK Beograd
- 2018–2019: Vera Tbilisi
- 2020–2021: Napredak Junior
- 2021–present: Radnik Surdulica

Ivan Saičić (Serbian Cyrillic: Иван Саичић; born 8 February 1993) is a Serbian professional basketball player for Radnik Surdulica of the Second Basketball League of Serbia.

== College career ==
Saičić played his freshman season of college basketball at the Winthrop University, in their 2013–14 season. As a sophomore and junior, Saičić played for University of West Georgia from 2015 to 2017. Saičić played his senior season at the Oklahoma City University, in their 2017–18 season.

== Professional career ==
Saičić played for Crvena zvezda and Vršac prior he moved to the United States in 2013 to pursuit with college basketball. After he finished college career in 2018 he signed for OKK Beograd.

Saičić joined Georgian team Vera Tbilisi for the 2018–19 season. In August 2020, he signed for Napredak Junior.
