= Vladimir Ivelja =

Serbian basketball player

Hercegovac Gajdobra
- Position: Power forward

Personal information
- Born: March 20, 1988 (age 38) Tuzla, SR Bosnia and Herzegovina, SFR Yugoslavia
- Listed height: 2.03 m (6 ft 8 in)

Career information
- NBA draft: 2010: undrafted
- Playing career: 2005–present

Career history
- 2005–2006: Vrbas
- 2006–2008: Radnički Novi Sad
- 2008–2011: FMP
- 2011–2014: Vojvodina Srbijagas
- 2014–2015: Kožuv
- 2015–2016: Feni Industries
- 2016–2017: Esprit Košice
- 2017–2018: Iskra Svit
- 2018: Lovćen 1947
- 2019: Kozuv
- 2019–2020: Čapljina Lasta
- 2021–present: Hercegovac Gajdobra

Vladimir Ivelja (born March 20, 1988) is a Serbian professional basketball power forward who play for Hercegovac Gajdobra of the Second Basketball League of Serbia.
