= Vasilije Curcic =

Serbian basketball player

No. 44 – Hercegovac Gajdobra
- Position: Power forward
- League: Basketball League of Serbia

Personal information
- Born: October 11, 1991 (age 35) Kragujevac, Serbia
- Listed height: 6 ft 9 in (2.06 m)
- Listed weight: 235 lb (107 kg)

Career information
- College: Memorial (2012–2017)
- NBA draft: 2017: undrafted
- Playing career: 2017–present

Career history
- 2017–2018: St. John's Edge
- 2018–2019: Basket Navarra
- 2024–2026: Zlatibor
- 2026–present: Hercegovac Gajdobra

Career highlights
- 3× Second-team AUS All-Star (2014–2015, 2017); First-team AUS All-Star (2016)

Vasilije Curcic (Vasilije Ćurčić; born October 11, 1991) is a Serbian professional basketball player who last played for the St. John's Edge of the National Basketball League of Canada (NBLC). He played five seasons of college basketball for the Memorial Sea-Hawks of Atlantic University Sport (AUS) in Canada, winning conference honors each year. A 6-foot-9, 235-pound power forward and native of Kragujevac, Serbia, Curcic attended high school at First Kragujevac Gymnasium. Vasilije has one son born in 2018 named Nelson Vincent.

== Early life ==
Curcic was born in the Serbian city of Kragujevac, where he attended First Kragujevac Gymnasium. In 2012, he took part in the postgraduate program at Luxembourg Basketball Academy (LBBA) for nine months. At LBBA, he helped draw attention from the Memorial University of Newfoundland, and on August 12, 2012, he committed to play with the Sea-Hawks under head coach Peter Benoite.

== College career ==
As a first-year member of the Memorial Sea-Hawks, on February 2, 2013, Curcic was tabbed as athlete of the week by The Telegram after recording a total of 49 points, 15 rebounds, and six assists in two games against St. Francis Xavier. He was named to the Atlantic University Sport (AUS) All-Rookie Team. For his next two seasons, Curcic was named second-team and then first-team AUS All-Star. He earned second-team honors in the following year. In 2016–17, Curcic was sidelined for much of the season because of injury but finished with second-team AUS All-Star accolades. By the end of his college career, after leading Memorial in scoring for all five seasons, Curcic was considered one of the best players in program history. He left Memorial as its third all-time leading scorer.

== Professional career ==
After graduating from Memorial, Curcic returned to Serbia to play professionally, but he was unable to find any satisfactory offers. On December 12, 2017, he signed with the St. John's Edge of the National Basketball League of Canada (NBLC). With the move, he reunited with Carl English, who he had trained with for several previous offseasons. On December 17, Curcic debuted for St. John's, with two points and one assist in nine minutes against the London Lightning. He recorded 11 points, seven rebounds, and two assists—all season-highs—in a win over the Niagara River Lions on January 21, 2018. Curcic was deactivated and released by the Edge on February 12, after he suffered a leg injury in practice.
