= KK Mladost Čačak =

Basketball club in Čačak, Serbia

Mladost Čačak
- Leagues: First Regional League of Serbia
- Founded: 6 February 1995; 30 years ago
- History: KK Mladost (1995–present)
- Arena: Borac Hall
- Capacity: 4,000
- Location: Čačak, Serbia
- Team colors: Blue, Orange
- Website: www.kkmladost.rs

Košarkaški klub Mladost (Serbian Cyrillic: Кошаркашки клуб Младост), commonly referred to as KK Mladost Čačak, is a men's basketball club based in Čačak, Serbia. The club currently competes in the 3rd-tier First Regional League of Serbia.

== History ==
The club is founded on 6 February 1995 in Čačak, succeeding a basketball academy founded by coach Ratko Joksić in 1991. The club brought together young coaches such as Doborilo Jojić, Vladimir Androić, Dejan Tomić, Dragan Cvetković, among others.

== Coaches ==
- (Serbia and Montenegro) Vladimir Androić
- (Serbia) Vladimir Zlatanović
- (Serbia) Mihailo Sušić

== See also ==
- KK Borac Čačak
- KK Čačak 94
- KK Železničar Čačak
