= Radisav Ćurčić =

Serbian basketball player

Radisav Ćurčić Радисав Ћурчић
Personal information
- Born: September 26, 1965 (age 61) Čačak, SR Serbia, SFR Yugoslavia
- Listed height: 6 ft 10 in (2.08 m)
- Listed weight: 275 lb (125 kg)

Career information
- NBA draft: 1987: undrafted
- Playing career: 1986–2002
- Position: Center
- Number: 44

Career history
- 1986–1987: Železničar Čačak
- 1987–1992: Smelt Olimpija
- 1992: APU Udine
- 1992–1993: Dallas Mavericks
- 1993–1994: Dinamo Sassari
- 1994–1996: Maccabi Tel Aviv
- 1996–1997: Tuborg
- 1997–1999: Hapoel Jerusalem
- 1999–2000: Fenerbahçe
- 2000–2002: Maccabi Tel Aviv
- Stats at NBA.com
- Stats at Basketball Reference
Medals
Men's basketball
Representing Yugoslavia
World Championships
| Gold medal – first place | 1990 Argentina | National team |
Goodwill Games
| Gold medal – first place | 1990 Seattle |

Radisav Ćurčić (Serbian: Радисав Ћурчић, pronounced [ˌrǎdisaʋ ˈt͜ɕûːrt͡ʃit͜ɕ], Hebrew: ראדיסאב צ'ורצ'יץ'; born September 26, 1965) is a Serbian-Israeli former professional basketball player. Standing at 6 ft 10 in (2.08 m) and weighing 275 pounds (125 kg), he played the center position. He represented the Yugoslavia national basketball team internationally.

== Playing career ==
A center, Ćurčić played 17 seasons in Yugoslavia, Italy, Turkey, and Israel, from 1986 to 2002. During his playing days, he played for Železničar Čačak, Smelt Olimpija, APU Udine, the Dallas Mavericks, Dinamo Sassari, Maccabi Tel Aviv, Tuborg, Hapoel Jerusalem, and Fenerbahçe. He retired as a player with Maccabi Tel Aviv in 2002.

== National team career ==
In August 1990, Ćurčić was a member of the Yugoslavia national team that won a gold medal at the FIBA World Championship in Argentina. Over six tournament games, he averaged 2.3 points per game.

== Career achievements and awards ==
Trophies

- FIBA SuproLeague champion: 1 (with Maccabi Tel Aviv: 2000–01)
- Israeli Premier League champion: 4 (with Maccabi Tel Aviv: 1994–95, 1995–96, 2000–01, 2001–02)
- Israeli State Cup winner: 2 (with Maccabi Tel Aviv: 2001, 2002)

Individual awards

- Israeli Basketball Premier League MVP — 1999

== NBA career statistics ==
Legend
| GP | Games played | GS | Games started | MPG | Minutes per game |
| FG% | Field goal percentage | 3P% | 3-point field goal percentage | FT% | Free throw percentage |
| RPG | Rebounds per game | APG | Assists per game | SPG | Steals per game |
| BPG | Blocks per game | PPG | Points per game | **Bold** | Career high |

=== Regular season ===
| Year | Team | GP | GS | MPG | FG% | 3P% | FT% | RPG | APG | SPG | BPG | PPG |
|---|---|---|---|---|---|---|---|---|---|---|---|---|
| 1992–93 | Dallas | 20 | 0 | 8.3 | .390 | — | .722 | 2.5 | .6 | .4 | .1 | 2.9 |

== See also ==
- List of Serbian NBA players
