= Radenko Pilčević =

Serbian basketball player

Čačak 94
- Position: Point guard / shooting guard
- League: Basketball League of Serbia

Personal information
- Born: December 15, 1986 (age 39) Gornji Milanovac, SR Serbia, SFR Yugoslavia
- Listed height: 1.88 m (6 ft 2 in)
- Listed weight: 85 kg (187 lb)

Career information
- NBA draft: 2008: undrafted
- Playing career: 2004–present

Career history
- 2004–2005: Železničar Čačak
- 2005–2006: Ribnica
- 2006–2007: Crnokosa
- 2007–2008: Proleter Naftagas
- 2008–2009: Borac Čačak
- 2009–2011: Mitteldeutscher
- 2011–2012: Gießen 46ers
- 2012: Feni Industries
- 2013: Crnokosa
- 2013–2014: Radnički Kragujevac
- 2014: Szolnoki Olaj
- 2014: U Pitești
- 2014–2015: Timișoara
- 2015: Metalac Valjevo
- 2015–2016: Craiova
- 2016–2017: Košice
- 2017: Science City Jena
- 2017–2018: Košice
- 2018: Teodo Tivat
- 2018–2019: Lovćen 1947
- 2019–2021: Bratunac
- 2021–present: Čačak 94

Radenko Pilčević (Serbian Cyrillic: Раденко Пилчевић; born December 15, 1986) is a Serbian professional basketball player for Čačak 94 of the Basketball League of Serbia. He can play both point guard and shooting guard positions.

== Professional career ==
In December 2013, he signed with Radnički Kragujevac. He left them in February 2014. Later that month he moved to Hungary and signed with Szolnoki Olaj for the remainder of the season.

In August 2014, he signed with BCM U Pitești of the Romanian League. On November 27, 2014, he left Pitești. Three days later, he signed with BC Timișoara for the rest of the season.

On August 11, 2015, he signed with Lithuanian club BC Dzūkija. However, he left Dzūkija before appearing in a game for them. In October 2015, he signed with Metalac Valjevo. On December 3, 2015, he parted ways with Metalac after appearing in seven ABA league games.

On June 18, 2017, he signed with German club Science City Jena for the 2017–18 season. After only three games he left Jena and returned to his former club KB Košice. In 2018, he had a stint with Teodo Tivat. In August 2018, he signed for Lovćen 1947.

In August 2021, he signed for Čačak 94 of the Second Basketball League of Serbia.
