= KK Radnik Surdulica =

Basketball club in Surdulica, Serbia

Radnik
- Leagues: Second League of Serbia
- Founded: 1998; 27 years ago
- History: KK Radnik; 1998–present
- Arena: Surdulica Sports Hall
- Capacity: 800
- Location: Surdulica, Serbia
- Team colors: Blue, white

Košarkaški klub Radnik (Serbian Cyrillic: Кошаркашки клуб Радник), commonly referred to as KK Radnik, is a men's basketball club based in Surdulica, Serbia. They are currently competing in the Second Basketball League of Serbia.

== History ==
The club won the First Regional League – East Division in the 2020–21 season and get qualified to the Second League of Serbia for the 2021–22 season.

== Players ==
- (Serbia) Ivan Saičić
- (Serbia) Andrija Simović

== Head coaches ==
- (Serbia) Milan Janjić (2019–)

== Trophies and awards ==
=== Trophies ===
- First Regional League, East Division (3rd-tier)
  - Winners (1): 2020–21

== See also ==
- FK Radnik Surdulica
