= KK Hercegovac Gajdobra =

Basketball club in Bačka Palanka, Serbia

Hercegovac
- Leagues: Basketball League of Serbia
- Founded: April 2019; 7 years ago
- History: KK Hercegovac; 2019–present
- Arena: Gajdobra Sports Center
- Capacity: 800
- Location: Gajdobra, Serbia
- Team colors: Blue, white
- President: Stojan Dangubic
- Head coach: Aleksandar Komnenić
- Website: kkhercegovac.rs

Košarkaški klub Hercegovac (Serbian Cyrillic: Кошаркашки клуб Херцеговац), commonly referred to as KK Hercegovac, is a men's professional basketball club based in Gajdobra, near Bačka Palanka, Vojvodina, Serbia. They are currently competing in the Basketball League of Serbia.

The club bears its name after an ethnonym Herzegovinian.

== History ==
The club was formed in April 2019, bearing the same name of the club dissolved in 2002. In their first competition, the club won the 2019 Vojvodina Summer League (5th-tier) and got qualified to the Second Regional League for the 2019–20 season. In the 2020–21 season, the club won the 3rd-tier First Regional League – North Division and got qualified to the Second League of Serbia for the 2021–22 season.

=== Current roster ===
Note: Flags indicate national team eligibility at FIBA-sanctioned events. Players may hold other non-FIBA nationalities not displayed.

KK Hercegovac Gajdobra roster
Players
Coaches

Pos.	No.	Nat.	Name	Ht.		Age
G		(Serbia)	Todoric, Mateja	1.90 m (6 ft 3 in)		38 – 10 August 1988
G		(Serbia)	Tejic, Bogdan	1.89 m (6 ft 2 in)		25 – 18 January 2001
SG		(Serbia)	Zarić, Aleksa	1.94 m (6 ft 4 in)		28 – 28 March 1998
G		(Serbia)	Dimić, Miloš	1.95 m (6 ft 5 in)		36 – 17 October 1989
SG		(Serbia)	Stojanovic, Dusan
F		(Serbia)	Marko, Brekic	1.99 m (6 ft 6 in)		24 – 8 November 2001
SF		(Serbia)	Kumović, Ranko	1.97 m (6 ft 6 in)		24 – 16 February 2002
G/F		(Serbia)	Grusanovic, Mladen	2.00 m (6 ft 7 in)		29 – 3 March 1997
F		(Serbia)	Radovanovic, Predrag (C)
PF		(Serbia)	Dangubic, Risto	1.97 m (6 ft 6 in)		24 – 28 June 2002
C		(Serbia)	Maric, Dragan	2.04 m (6 ft 8 in)		30 – 25 June 1996
F/C		(Serbia)	Gaćeša, Nikola	2.05 m (6 ft 9 in)		38 – 20 September 1987
PF		(Serbia)	Curcic, Vasilije	2.06 m (6 ft 9 in)	107 kg (236 lb)	34 – 11 October 1991

Head coach

- (Serbia) Aleksandar Komnenić

Assistant coach(es)

- (Serbia) Vukasin Jelacic

Legend

- (C) Team captain
- (TW) Two-way affiliate player
- Injured

- Roster
Updated: January 19, 2024

== Head coaches ==
- (Serbia) Radomir Kisić (2019–2022)
- (Serbia) Slobodan Bjelica (2022)
- (Serbia) Miloš Luburić (2022–2023)
- (Serbia) Aleksandar Komnenić (2023-present)

== Trophies and awards ==
=== Trophies ===
- First Regional League, North Division (3rd-tier)
  - Winners (1): 2020–21
- League Cup of Serbia (2nd-tier)
  - Winner (1): 2023–24

== Notable players ==
- (Serbia) Strahinja Stojačić
- (Serbia) Stefan Stojačić
- (Serbia) Božo Đumić
- (Serbia) Vladimir Ivelja
- (Serbia) Marko Branković
- (Serbia) Dejan Janjić
- (Serbia) Vasilije Curcic
