= KK Žitko Basket =

Basketball club in Belgrade, Serbia

Žitko Basket
- Leagues: Second League of Serbia
- History: KK Žitko Basket
- Arena: Master Sport Center
- Capacity: 750
- Location: Belgrade, Serbia
- Team colors: Blue, yellow

Košarkaški klub Žitko Basket (Serbian Cyrillic: Кошаркашки клуб Житко Баскет), commonly referred to as KK Žitko Basket, is a men's basketball club based in Belgrade, Serbia. They are currently competing in the Second Basketball League of Serbia.

== History ==
The club got media attention in the mid-2010s due to the basketball development of Bogdan Bogdanović who played for their youth system before signed for Partizan in September 2010. Also, the club got attention in 2020 due to a similarity of their logo with one from the Golden State Warriors. The club logo has the Ada Bridge silhouette.

In April 2021, the club won the First Regional League Central Division for the 2020–21 season and got promoted to the Second League of Serbia for the 2021–22 season.

== Players ==
- (Serbia) Marko Čakarević
- (Serbia) Bogdan Riznić
- (Serbia) Matija Belić

== Head coaches ==
- (Serbia and Montenegro) (Serbia) Dragan Jakovljević (2000–2013, 2014–2019)
- (Serbia) Milan Stevanović (2021)
- (Serbia) Marko Boras (2021–2022)
- (Serbia) Nenad Karanović (2022–2023)
- (Serbia) Marko Ljubojević (2023–present)

== Season-by-season ==
Season	Tier	Division	Pos.	W–L	National Cup	Regional competitions	European competitions
2009–10	3	First Regional League	13	3–23	-	-	-
2010–11	3	First Regional League	10	10–16	-	-	-
2011–12	3	First Regional League	7	12–14	-	-	-
2012–13	3	First Regional League	11	8–18	-	-	-
2013–14	3	First Regional League	14	2–24	-	-	-
2014–15	3	First Regional League	9	10–16	-	-	-
2015–16	3	First Regional League	3	17–9	-	-	-
2016–17	3	First Regional League	9	11–15	-	-	-
2017-18	3	First Regional League	8	7–15	-	-	-
2018–19	3	First Regional League	8	7–13	-	-	-
2019–20	3	First Regional League	9	4–14	-	-	-
2020–21	3	First Regional League	1	24–2	-	-	-
2021–22	2	BLS Second League	11	10–12	-	-	-

== Trophies and awards ==
=== Trophies ===
- First Regional League, Center Division (3rd-tier)
  - Winners (1): 2020–21

== Notable players ==
Youth system

- (Serbia) Marko Čakarević
- (Serbia) Bogdan Bogdanović
