= Miloš Isakov Kovačević =

Serbian basketball coach

Personal information
- Born: 15 June 1989 (age 37) Novi Sad, SR Serbia, Yugoslavia
- Position: Head Coach

Career history

Coaching
- Mladost Veternik
- 2020–2022: Vojvodina (assistant)
- 2022–2025: Vojvodina

Miloš Isakov Kovačević (Serbian Cyrillic: Милош Исаков Ковачевић; born 15 June 1989) is a Serbian professional basketball coach for Vojvodina of the Basketball League of Serbia.

== Early life and education ==
Isakov Kovačević earned his degree in medicine from the University of Novi Sad. In October 2020, the College of Sports and Health in Belgrade awarded their best students, including Isakov Kovačević.

== Coaching career ==
Isakov Kovačević started his coaching career with Mladost Veternik. In August 2020, Isakov Kovačević joined Vojvodina as an assistant coach. On 15 June 2022, Vojvodina hired Isakov Kovačević as their new head coach.

== National team coaching career ==
In July/August 2019, Isakov Kovačević was an assistant coach for Serbia national under-18 team at the FIBA U18 European Championship in Volos, Greece.

In February 2022, Serbia national team head coach Svetislav Pešić added Isakov Kovačević as a scout to his coaching staff. He left the position in August 2022.

In July 2022, Isakov Kovačević was the head coach for the Serbia national under-15 team that finished 7th at the European Youth Olympic Festival in Banská Bystrica, Slovakia.
