= KK Čačak 94 =

Basketball club in Čačak, Serbia

Čačak 94
- Leagues: Basketball League of Serbia
- Founded: 1994; 32 years ago
- History: KK Čačak 94 (1994–present)
- Arena: Borac Hall
- Capacity: 4,000
- Location: Čačak, Serbia
- Team colors: Red, blue, white
- President: Nikola Bojovic
- Head coach: Vladimir Zlatanovic
- Website: kkcacak94.rs

Košarkaški klub Čačak '94 (Serbian Cyrillic: Кошаркашки клуб Чачак '94), commonly referred to as KK Čačak 94 or Čačak 94 Quantox due to sponsorship reasons, is a men's professional basketball club based in Čačak, Serbia. The club currently participates in the Basketball League of Serbia.

== History ==
The initiative for founding of the Čačak94 basketball club was started by a group of basketball enthusiasts in 1994. Dragomir Grujović was chosen for the president. In the words of the founders themselves, there was the need for a third basketball club in Čačak because of a big number of boys who were training basketball and couldn't find their place in senior teams of the two existing clubs in Čačak. The first coach of the team was Dobrilo Jojić and the assistant coach was Slobodan Jovanović. The next summer, the management of the club was made stronger by Mirko Drobnjak and the club managed to win its first higher competition rank – The II Serbian League Western Group. The team finished the 1999–2000 season on the 13th position and lost the status of a member of the II Serbian League.

In August 2000, great sports enthusiast and basketball lover Zoran Krivokapić gathered a group of fifteen-year-old boys who he played the League of the younger categories of the Region 6 for the next couple of years. During 2002, great efforts were made in order to reorganize the club so that it could play the senior level basketball. Dušan Nikolić was elected the club's president and Zoran Krivokapić was the coach. In that way, all the conditions for the continuation of the competition were created. In 2002/2003 season, the team returns in the senior competition and already in 2003 it gets the cadet team as well. Since 2003 until this day, Čačak94 has played a great number of games in the Summer League and the II Serbian League.

During 2016, the club was taken over by a new management led by Vuk Popović who played for Cacak94 for 10 seasons before becoming an owner. In the 2020–21 2MLS season, the club was promoted to the 2nd-tier Second League of Serbia. In the next season, the club finished 2nd and achieved promotion to the top-tier Basketball League of Serbia for the 2022–23 BLS season.

== Cooperation with Dubai Basketball ==
Basketball club Dubai established business and technical cooperation with Čačak 94 with the aim of developing young basketball talents.

This cooperation would bring Čačak 94 significant financial support and additional club stability. This project is part of a wider plan that also includes Basketball club Vojvodina in Novi Sad.

== Players ==
=== Current roster ===
Note: Flags indicate national team eligibility at FIBA-sanctioned events. Players may hold other non-FIBA nationalities not displayed.

Čačak 94 roster
Players
Coaches

Pos.	No.	Nat.	Name	Ht.	Age
PG	4	(Serbia)	Pilčević, Radenko	1.87 m (6 ft 2 in)	39 – 15 December 1986
SG	5	(Serbia)	Ćurčić, Đorđe	1.88 m (6 ft 2 in)	22 – 10 July 2004
SF	6	(Serbia)	Popović, Matija	2.00 m (6 ft 7 in)	30 – 14 October 1996
G/F	7	(Serbia)	Gugović, Vuk	1.97 m (6 ft 6 in)	27 – 13 November 1998
SF	8	(United States)	Pulliam, Trey	195 m (639 ft 9 in)	28 – 7 July 1998
SG	9	(Serbia)	Tresač, Đorđe	1.93 m (6 ft 4 in)	38 – 9 December 1987
SG	10	(United States)	Daniels, Devon	1.98 m (6 ft 6 in)	28 – 18 June 1998
SG	11	(Serbia)	Radovanovic, Nikola	196 m (643 ft 1 in)	24–25 – Missing required parameter 1=month! 2001
SG	12	(Serbia)	Popović, Vuk	186 m (610 ft 3 in)	42 – 31 January 1984
F/C	13	(Serbia)	Majstorović, Đorđe	2.08 m (6 ft 10 in)	36 – 13 March 1990
			[[ | ]]
C	15	(Serbia)	Pantić, Mladen	2.10 m (6 ft 11 in)	44 – 31 July 1982
			[[ | ]]
PG		(Serbia)	Dumić, Filip	1.83 m (6 ft 0 in)	36 – 8 October 1990

Head coach

- (Serbia) Djordje Micic (basketball)

Assistant coach(es)

Marko Marinovic

Team manager

Kosta Nikitovic

Legend

- (C) Team captain
- Injured

- Roster
Updated: June 6, 2022

== Coaches ==
- (Serbia and Montenegro) Dobrilo Jojić
- (Serbia and Montenegro) Zoran Krivokapić
- (Serbia) Zoran Stefanović (2017–2022)
- (Serbia) Ivan Radovanović (2022)
- (Serbia) Vladimir Lučić (2022)
- (Serbia) Ivan Radovanović (2022)
- (Serbia) Djordje Mićić (2022)
- (Serbia) Marko Marinović (2022)

== Trophies and awards ==
=== Trophies ===
- First Regional League, West Division (3rd-tier)
  - Winners (1): 2020–21
- Second Regional League, West Group One Division (4th-tier)
  - Winners (1): 2017–18

== See also ==
- KK Borac Čačak
- KK Mladost Čačak
- KK Železničar Čačak
