= Dragan Jakovljević (basketball) =

Serbian basketball coach

Personal information
- Born: 18 April 1973 (age 53) Belgrade, SR Serbia, SFR Yugoslavia
- Position: Head coach
- Coaching career: 2000–present

Career history

Coaching
- 2000–2013: Žitko Basket
- 2013–2014: Crvena zvezda U16
- 2014–2019: Žitko Basket
- 2019–2022: Mladost Zemun

Dragan Jakovljević (Serbian Cyrillic: Драган Jaкoвљeвић; born 18 April 1973) is a Serbian professional basketball coach. He last served as a head coach for Mladost Zemun of the Basketball League of Serbia and the ABA League Second Division.

== Coaching career ==
Jakovljević spent the first 19 years of his coaching career working with youth system. Almost the entire time, he spent with the Belgrade-based Žitko Basket. The only time out of Žitko Basket was in the 2013–14 season when he coached Crvena zvezda U16 team.

On 24 July 2019, Jakovljević was named the head coach for Mladost Zemun of the Basketball League of Serbia.
