= KK Star =

Basketball club in Belgrade, Serbia

Star
- Leagues: Second League of Serbia
- Founded: 16 April 2004; 21 years ago
- History: KK Star; 2004–present
- Arena: SPC Vojvodina
- Capacity: 1,030
- Location: Novi Sad, Serbia
- Team colors: Orange and Black
- President: Mićo Radanović
- Website: kkstar.org

Košarkaški klub Star (Serbian Cyrillic: Кошаркашки клуб Стар, transl. Star Basketball Club), commonly referred to as KK Star, is a men's basketball club based in Novi Sad, Serbia. They are currently competing in the Second Basketball League of Serbia.

== History ==
Founded in April 2004 in Novi Ledinci, the club used to play in the 3rd-tier First Regional League of Serbia, North Division.

In September 2020, they got a wild card and promotion to the Second Basketball League of Serbia for the 2020–21 season following withdrawal of Spartak.

== Home arena ==
Star plays its home games at the SPC Vojvodina small hall. The hall is located in Novi Sad, Vojvodina Province, and was built in 1981. The small hall has a seating capacity of 1,030 seats.

== Players ==
- Danilo Mijatović

== Head coaches ==
- (Serbia) Dimitrije Živković (2019–2021)
- (Serbia) Aleksandar Komnenić (2021–present)

== Trophies and awards ==
=== Trophies ===
- Second Regional League, North–N Division (4th-tier)
  - Winners (1): 2017–18

== See also ==
- KK Vojvodina
