= KK Železničar Čačak =

Basketball club in Čačak, Serbia

Železničar Čačak
- Nickname: Žele
- Leagues: Second League of Serbia
- Founded: 1949; 77 years ago
- History: KK Železničar (1949–present)
- Arena: Borac Hall
- Capacity: 4,000
- Location: Čačak, Serbia
- Team colors: Blue and White
- President: Dušan Vulović
- Head coach: Aleksandar Bjelić
- Website: kkzeleznicarcacak.rs

Košarkaški klub Železničar Čačak (Serbian Cyrillic: Кошаркашки клуб Железничар Чачак), commonly referred to as KK Železničar Čačak, is a men's professional basketball club based in Čačak, Serbia. The club currently participates in the Second League of Serbia.

Former Železničar player Aleksandar Nikolić, later a professional coach and a "father" of Serbian basketball, was inducted into the FIBA Hall of Fame and Basketball Hall of Fame as a coach. Also many famous players and coaches started their basketball careers in Želeničar, such as Dragan Kićanović, Željko Obradović, Radisav Ćurčić.

== Coaches ==
- (Serbia) Predrag Vučićević
- (Serbia) Željko Bugarčić (2016–2019)
- (Serbia) Branko Jorović (2019–2020)
- (Serbia) Aleksandar Bjelić (2020–present)

== See also ==
- KK Borac Čačak
- KK Čačak 94
- KK Mladost Čačak
