= Branko Jorović =

Serbian basketball coach and player

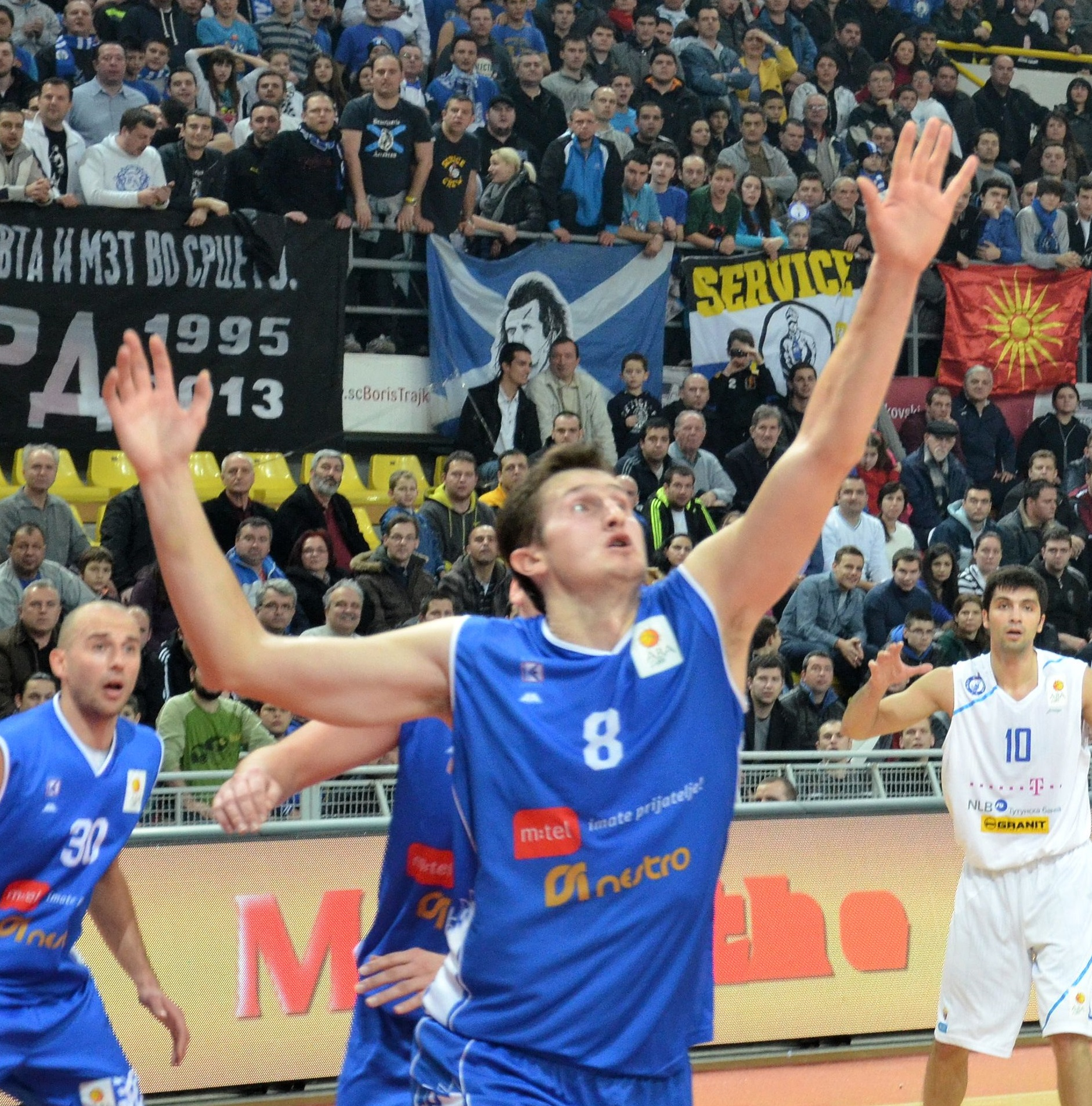
- Jorović playing for Igokea in January 2013.

Crvena zvezda Meridianbet
- Title: U-19 head coach
- League: Junior ABA League

Personal information
- Born: November 27, 1981 (age 44) Čačak, SFR Yugoslavia
- Listed height: 2.04 m (6 ft 8 in)
- Listed weight: 97 kg (214 lb)

Career information
- NBA draft: 2003: undrafted
- Playing career: 2000–2016
- Position: Small forward / power forward
- Number: 8
- Coaching career: 2017–present

Career history

Playing
- 2000–2003: Borac Čačak
- 2003–2006: FMP
- 2008: Olympias Patras
- 2008–2009: Swisslion Takovo
- 2009–2010: Borac Čačak
- 2010–2011: Kavala
- 2011–2012: Braunschweig
- 2012–2015: Igokea
- 2015: Borac Čačak
- 2015–2016: U-BT Cluj-Napoca

Coaching
- 2017: Bosna Royal (assistant)
- 2018–2019: Politehnica Iași
- 2019–2020: Železničar Čačak
- 2021–2022: Klik Arilje
- 2022: Crvena zvezda (assistant)
- 2022–present: Crvena zvezda U19
Medals
Men's basketball
Representing Serbia and Montenegro
Summer Universiade
Gold medal – first place	2003 Daegu

Branko Jorović (Serbian Cyrillic: Бранко Јоровић; born November 27, 1981) is a Serbian professional basketball coach and former player who serves as the U-19 head coach for Crvena zvezda mts. He played both the small forward and power forward positions.

== Playing career ==
A forward, Jorović played for Borac Čačak, FMP Železnik, Olympias Patras, Swisslion Takovo, Kavala, Braunschweig, Igokea, and U-BT Cluj-Napoca. He retired as a player with Cluj-Napoca in 2016.

== National team career ==
Jorović was a member of the Serbia and Montenegro national team at the 2006 FIBA World Championship in Japan. Previously, he won a gold medal at the 2003 Summer Universiade in Daegu.

== Coaching career ==
In October 207, Jorović was named an assistant coach for Bosna Royal. He left Bosnia in December 2017. In December 2019, he signed for Železničar Čačak.

In July 2022, Jorović became the head coach for Kolubara LA 2003 of the Basketball League of Serbia. However, Crvena zvezda mts added him to their coaching staff as an assistant coach, on 9 July 2022. On 19 November 2022, the club parted ways with his following the head coach change. Five days later, on 24 November, Crvena zvezda mts hired him as the U-19 team head coach.

== Career achievements ==
As player:

- Adriatic League champion: 2 (with FMP Železnik: 2003–04, 2005–06)
- Championship of Bosnia and Herzegovina champion: 3 (with Igokea: 2012–13, 2013–14, 2014–15)
- Serbian Cup winner: 1 (with FMP Železnik: 2004–05)
- Bosnia and Herzegovina Cup winner: 2 (with Igokea: 2012–13, 2014–15)
