= Borac Hall =

Indoor arena in Čačak, Serbia

Borac Hall Хала Борац
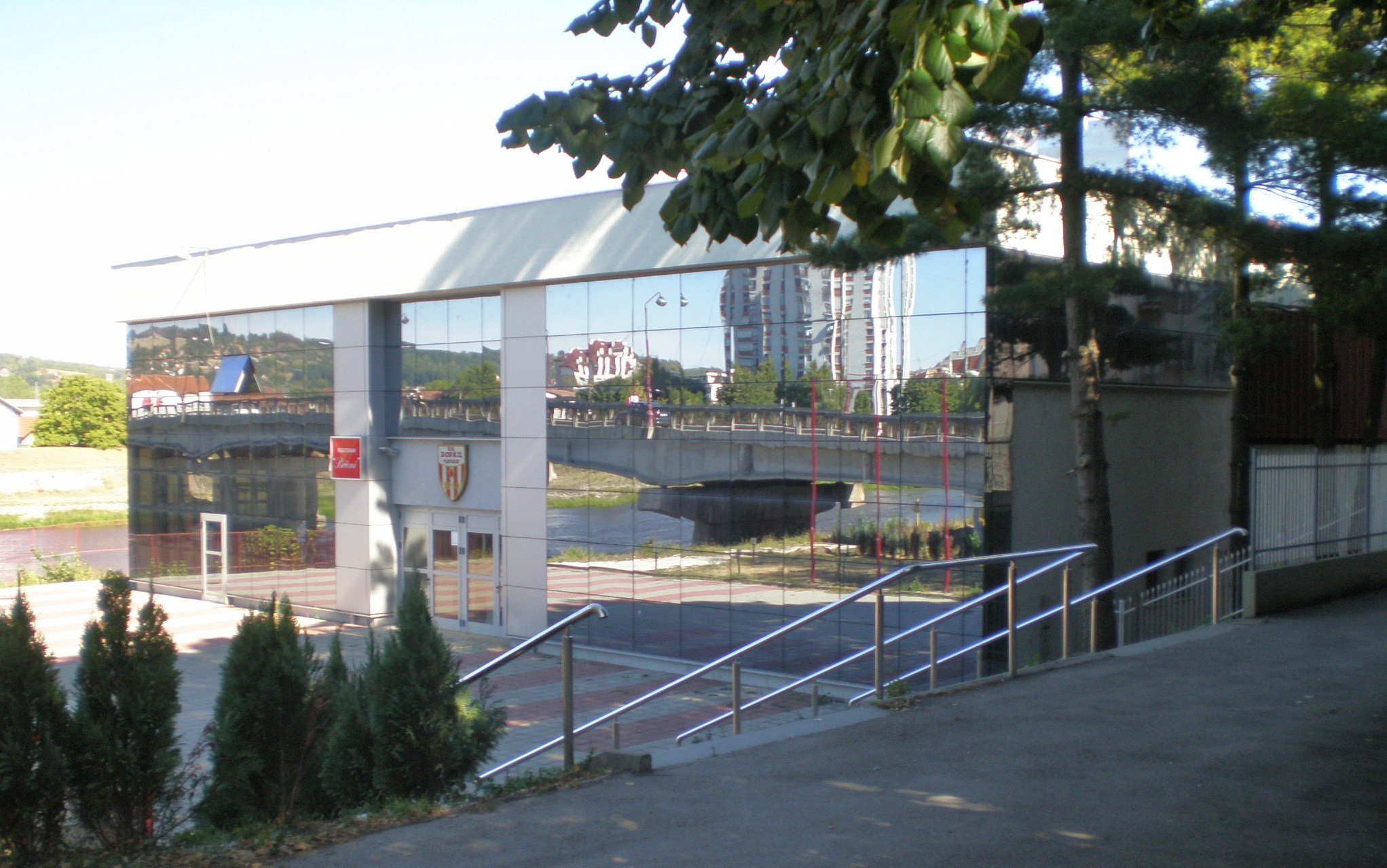
- Hall Borac from the outside
- Interactive map of Borac Hall; Хала Борац
- Location: Čačak, Serbia
- Coordinates: 43.897621°N 20.352492°E
- Capacity: 3,000
- Surface: Parquetry

Construction
- Opened: 1969; 57 years ago
- Renovated: 2009

Tenant
- KK Borac (1969–present)

Borac Hall Near Morava (Serbian: Хала Борца крај Мораве, romanized: Hala Borca kraj Morave), commonly known as Borac Hall (Serbian: Хала Борац, lit. 'Hala Borac'), is an indoor arena in Čačak, Serbia. It has a capacity of 4,000 people. It is home arena of a basketball club Borac.

== Gallery ==
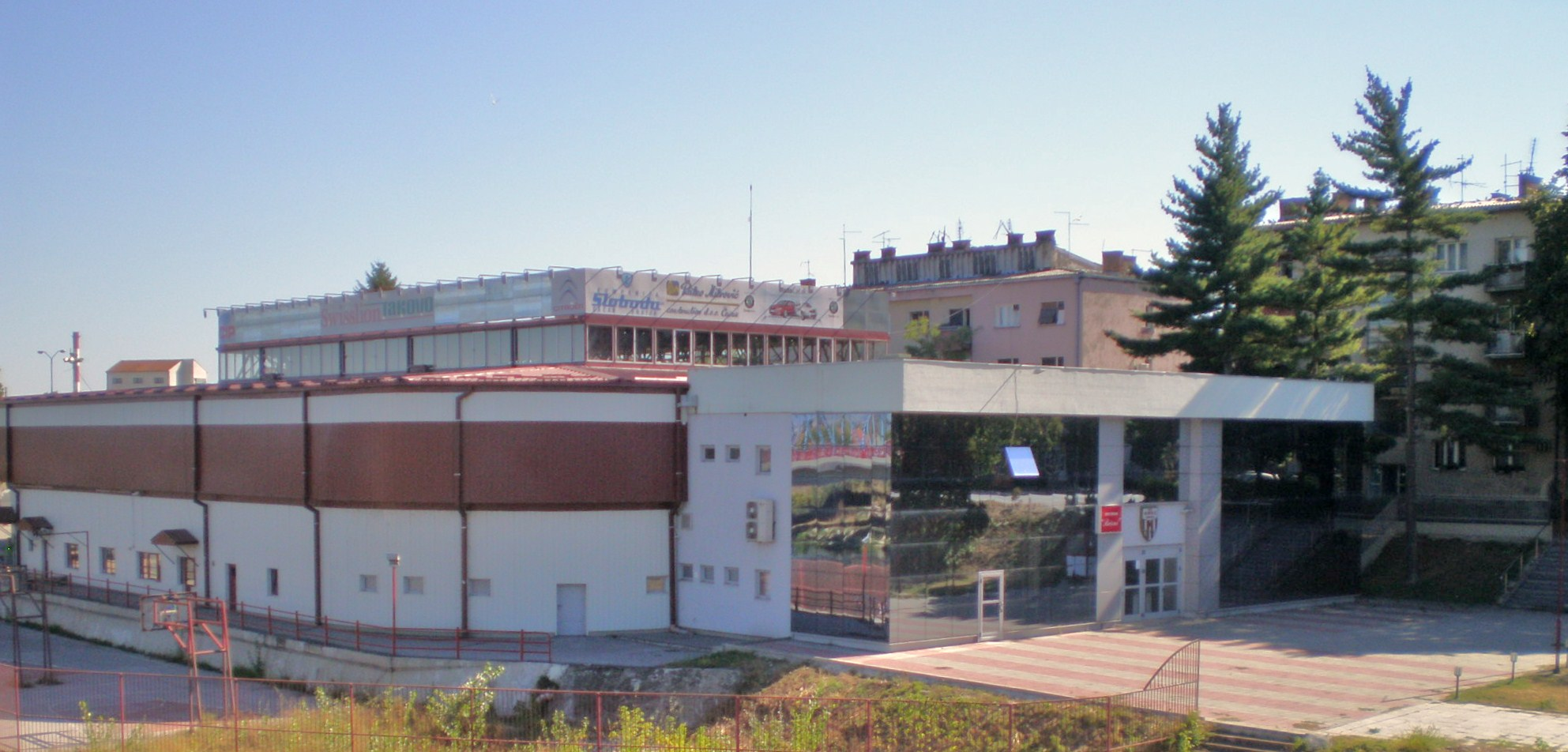
View on Borac Hall from outside, May 2013

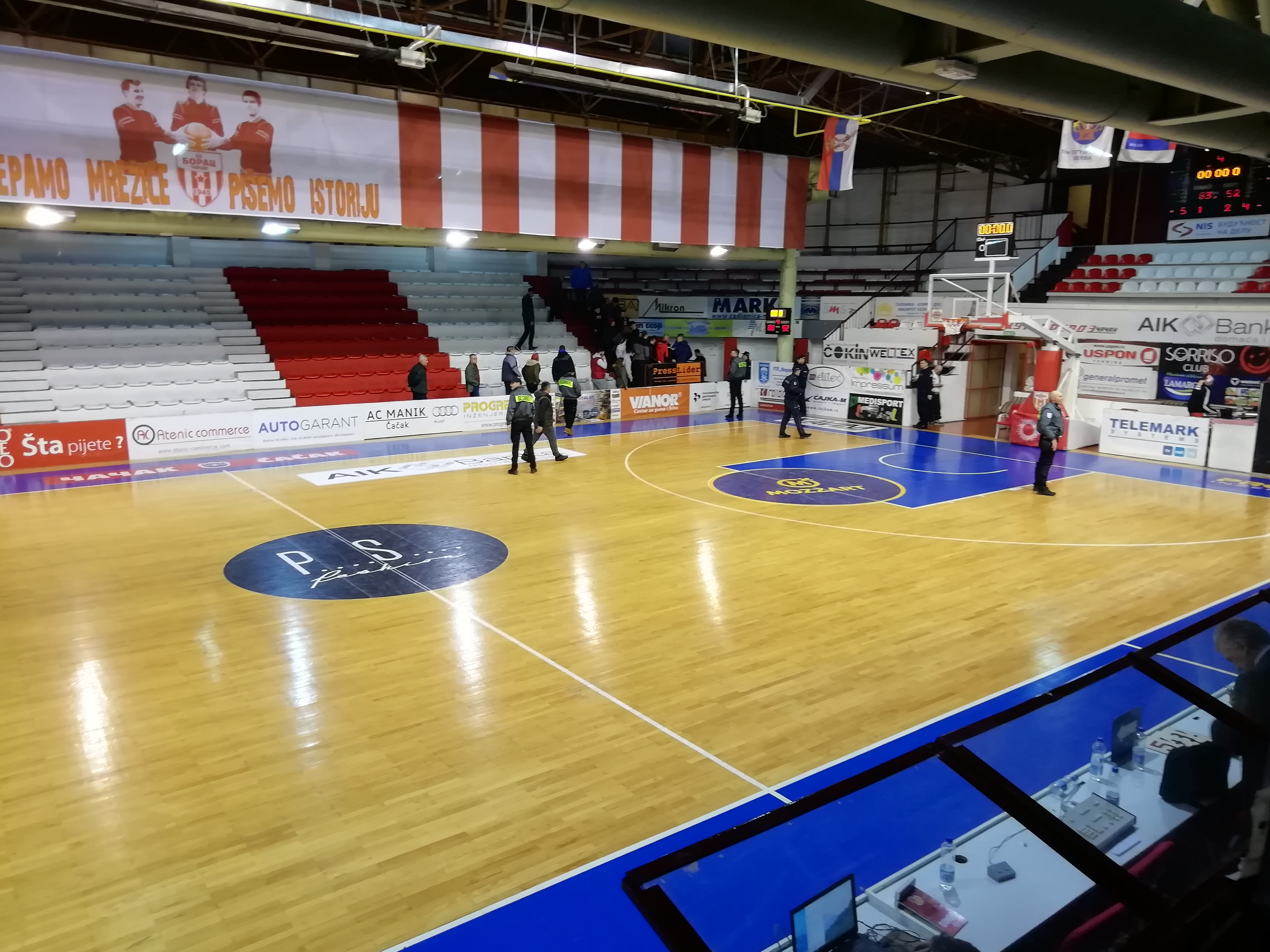
View on basketball court, February 2019

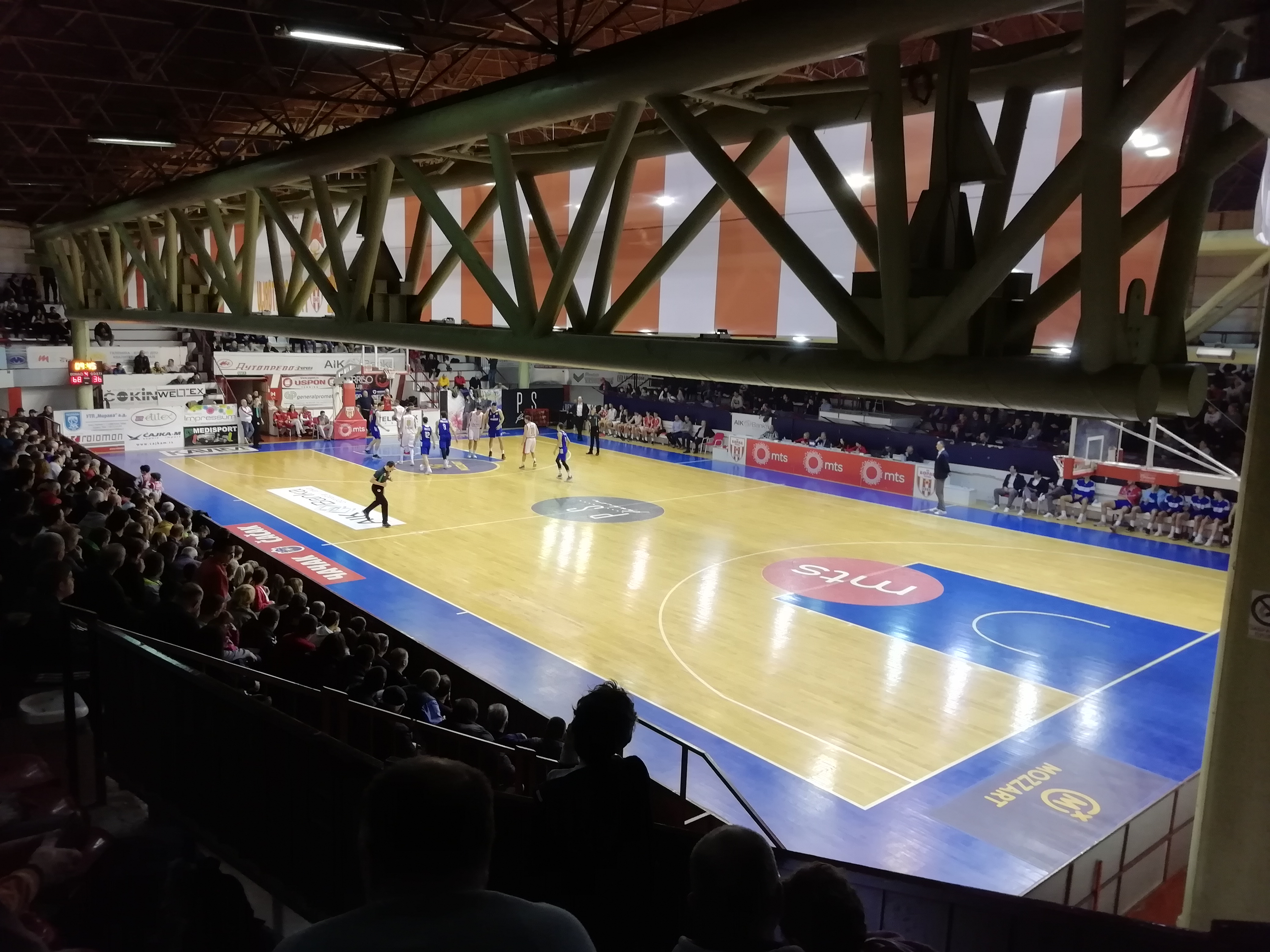
Indoors of Borac Hall, February 2019

== See also ==
- List of indoor arenas in Serbia
