= 2020–21 Basketball League of Serbia =

Basketball League of Serbia
- Season: 2020–21
- Duration: September 25, 2020 – April 10, 2021 (First League)
- Games played: 30 each (regular season)
- Teams: 16 (regular season); 21 (total)
- TV partner: Arena Sport

Regular season
- Season MVP: (Serbia) Đorđe Simeunović
- Relegated: Napredak JKP; Pirot

Finals
- Champions: Crvena zvezda mts
- Runners-up: Mega Soccerbet
- Semi-finalists: Partizan NIS; Borac
- Finals MVP: (Serbia) Ognjen Dobrić

Records
- Biggest home win: Dynamic 111–73 Sloga (3 October 2020)
- Biggest away win: Dynamic 54–82 Vojvodina (7 February 2021)
- Highest scoring: Mladost 116–114 Radnički (18 October 2020)
- Winning streak: 22 games Mladost
- Losing streak: 8 games Pirot
- All statistics correct as of April 7, 2021.

The 2020–21 Basketball League of Serbia (Serbian Cyrillic: Кошаркашка лига Србије 2020–21.) is the 15th season of the Basketball League of Serbia, the top-tier professional basketball league in Serbia. Also, it's the 77th national championship played by Serbian clubs inclusive of the nation's previous incarnations as Yugoslavia and Serbia & Montenegro.

The season is the first to be played after the previous season was abandoned due to the COVID-19 pandemic in Serbia. The Basketball Federation of Serbia ruled that the 13 teams from the previous season will stay in the league and the three highest-placed clubs from Second League will be promoted. The first-placed team from the previous season, Borac, joins the ABA League. Crvena zvezda mts is the defending champion.

The First League began on 25 September 2020. The SuperLeague will start in May 2021.

== Teams ==
A total of 21 teams participated in the 2020–21 Basketball League of Serbia.

=== Distribution ===
The following is the access list for this season.

Access list for the 2020–21 Serbian League
	Teams entering in this round	Teams advancing from the previous round
First League (16 teams)	13 teams from the last season; 3 highest-placed teams from the Second League	
Playoffs (8 teams)	5 Adriatic League teams (Borac, Crvena zvezda mts, FMP, Mega Soccerbet, Partizan NIS)	3 highest-placed teams from the First League

=== Promotion and relegation ===
Teams promoted from the Second League

- Radnički Kragujevac
- Sloga
- Pirot

Teams relegated to the Second League

- None

=== Venues and locations ===
Location of teams in the 2020–21 season

Team	Home city	Arena	Capacity
Borac	Čačak	Borac Hall	2,000
Crvena zvezda mts	Belgrade	Aleksandar Nikolić Hall	5,878
Dunav	Stari Banovci	Park Hall	—N/a
Dynamic VIP PAY	Belgrade	Ranko Žeravica Hall	5,000
FMP	Belgrade	Železnik Hall	3,000
Kolubara LA 2003	Lazarevac	Kolubara Sport Center	1,700
Mega Soccerbet	Belgrade	Mega Factory	700
Metalac	Valjevo	Valjevo Sports Hall	1,500
Mladost MaxBet	Zemun	Master Sport Center	750
Napredak JKP	Aleksinac	Aleksinac Sports Hall	1,400
Novi Pazar	Novi Pazar	Pendik Sports Hall	1,600
OKK Beograd	Belgrade	Mega Factory	700
Partizan NIS	Belgrade	Štark Arena	18,386
Pirot	Pirot	Pirot Kej Hall	835
Radnički	Kragujevac	Jezero Hall	3,750
Sloboda	Užice	Veliki Park Hall	2,200
Sloga	Kraljevo	Kraljevo Sports Hall	3,350
Tamiš	Pančevo	Strelište Sports Hall	1,100
Vojvodina	Novi Sad	SPC Vojvodina	7,022
Vršac	Vršac	Millennium Center	4,400
Zlatibor	Čajetina	Čajetina Sport Center	1,000

Teams that play in the 2020–21 First Adriatic League
Teams that play in the 2020–21 Second Adriatic League

== Regular season ==
The 2020–21 regular season began on 25 September 2020.

=== Personnel and sponsorship ===
Team	Head coach	Captain	Kit manufacturer	Shirt sponsor
Dunav	(Serbia) Mitar Ašćerić	(Serbia) Aleksandar Miljković	Cvetex	—
Dynamic VIP PAY	(Serbia) Saša Nikitović	(Serbia) Marko Čakarević	Champion	VIP PAY
Kolubara LA 2003	(Serbia) Marko Dimitrijević	(Serbia) Nikola Simić	—	EPS / Grad Lazarevac
Metalac	(Serbia) Vladimir Đokić	(Serbia) Igor Đuković	—	—
Mladost MaxBet	(Serbia) Dragan Jakovljević	(Serbia) Marko Milenković	Champion	—
Napredak JKP	(Serbia) Dušan Jelić	(Serbia) Nikola Raičević	—	—
Novi Pazar	(Greece) Darko Kostić	(Serbia) Asmir Numanović	—	Admiral
OKK Beograd	(Serbia) Branislav Ratkovica	(Serbia) Marko Boltić	Adidas	—
Pirot	(Serbia) Filip Socek	(Serbia) Miodrag Stojanović	—	—
Radnički Kragujevac	(Serbia) Ivica Vukotić	(Serbia) Raško Katić	Seven	City of Kragujevac
Sloboda	(Serbia) Oliver Popović	(Serbia) Stefan Simić	Ardu Sport	mts
Sloga	(Serbia) Dragan Kostić	(Serbia) Uroš Mirković	—	—
Tamiš	(Serbia) Nebojša Vidić	(Serbia) Saša Radović	—	—
Vojvodina	(Serbia) Miroslav Nikolić	(Serbia) Aleksa Zarić	Peak	—
Vršac	(Serbia) Vladimir Lučić	(Montenegro) Miloš Savović	Spirit	Villager / Element
Zlatibor	(Serbia) Strajin Nedović	(Serbia) Bogdan Riznić	Ardu Sport	—

=== Coaching changes ===
Team	Outgoing manager	Date of vacancy	Position in table	Replaced with	Date of appointment	Ref.
Vojvodina	(Serbia) Filip Socek	June 2020	Off-season	(Serbia) Miroslav Nikolić	June 2020	
OKK Beograd	(Serbia) Branko Milisavljević	5 June 2020	Off-season	(Serbia) Branislav Ratkovica	5 June 2020	
Novi Pazar	(Serbia) Oliver Popović	June 2020	Off-season	(Greece) Darko Kostić	16 June 2020	
Kolubara LA 2003	(Serbia) Dušan Radović	August 2020	Off-season	(Serbia) Marko Dimitrijević	August 2020	
Sloboda	(Serbia) Vladimir Lučić	1 November 2020	15th (1–5)	(Serbia) Oliver Popović	1 November 2020	
Vršac	(Serbia) Zoran Todorović	2 November 2020	16th (1–5)	(Serbia) Vladimir Lučić	2 November 2020	
Sloga	(Serbia) Saša Pavlović	9 November 2020	14th (2–5)	(Serbia) Zoran Petrović	9 November 2020	
Pirot	(Serbia) Marko Spasić	15 November 2020	12th (2–6)	(Serbia) Filip Socek	16 November 2020	
Sloga	(Serbia) Zoran Petrović	15 January 2021	12th (6–10)	(Serbia) Dragan Kostić	15 January 2021	
Radnički	(Serbia) Igor Todorović	23 January 2021	16th (6–10)	(Serbia) Ivica Vukotić	23 January 2021	
Napredak JKP	(Serbia) Nebojša Raičević	8 February 2021	12th (7–13)	(Serbia) Dušan Jelić	8 February 2021	
Dynamic VIP PAY	(Slovenia) Miro Alilović	12 February 2021	6th (9–11)	(Serbia) Saša Nikitović	12 February 2021	
Tamiš	(Serbia) Bojan Jovičić	10 March 2021	7th (11–12)	(Serbia) Nebojša Vidić	10 March 2021	

=== Standings ===
Pos	Team	Pld	W	L	PF	PA	PD	Pts	Qualification or relegation
1	Mladost MaxBet	30	28	2	2868	2583	+285	58	Qualification to Super League and ABA 2
2	Vojvodina	30	26	4	2631	2266	+365	56	Qualification to Super League and ABA 2
3	Zlatibor	30	19	11	2625	2476	+149	49	Qualification to Super League
4	Dynamic VIP PAY	30	16	14	2670	2600	+70	46	
5	Novi Pazar	30	16	14	2491	2490	+1	46	
6	Vršac	30	15	15	2617	2657	−40	45	
7	Sloboda	30	15	15	2555	2463	+92	45	
8	Tamiš	30	14	16	2560	2554	+6	44	
9	Kolubara LA 2003	30	13	17	2460	2588	−128	43	
10	OKK Beograd	30	12	18	2525	2527	−2	42	
11	Radnički	30	12	18	2660	2725	−65	42	
12	Metalac	30	12	18	2296	2472	−176	42	
13	Sloga	30	11	19	2431	2604	−173	41	
14	Dunav	30	11	19	2516	2684	−168	41	
15	Napredak JKP	30	11	19	2507	2561	−54	41	Relegation to Second League
16	Pirot	30	9	21	2385	2547	−162	39	Relegation to Second League

Source: KLS, SrbijaSport

== Super League ==
The Super League was canceled and the qualified teams were played in the Playoffs.

=== Qualified teams ===
First ABA League	Regular season
1 Crvena zvezda mts 2 Mega Soccerbet; 3 Partizan NIS; 4 FMP; 5 Borac	1 Mladost MaxBet; 2 Vojvodina; 3 Zlatibor

==== Personnel and sponsorship ====
Team	Head coach	Captain	Kit manufacturer	Shirt sponsor
Borac Čačak	(Serbia) Marko Marinović	(Serbia) Uroš Čarapić	—	P.S. Fashion
Crvena zvezda mts	(Montenegro) Dejan Radonjić	(Serbia) Branko Lazić	Adidas	mts
FMP	(Serbia) Vanja Guša	(Serbia) Radoš Šešlija	Adidas	FMP
Mega Soccerbet	(Serbia) Vlada Jovanović	(Serbia) Milenko Tepić	Adidas	Soccerbet / Tehnomanija
Mladost MaxBet	(Serbia) Dragan Jakovljević	(Serbia) Marko Milenković	Champion	—
Partizan NIS	(Serbia) Aleksandar Matović	(Serbia) Novica Veličković	Under Armour	NIS / mts
Vojvodina	(Serbia) Miroslav Nikolić	(Serbia) Aleksa Zarić	Peak	—
Zlatibor	(Serbia) Strajin Nedović	(Serbia) Bogdan Riznić	Ardu Sport	—

==== Coaching changes ====
Team	Outgoing manager	Date of vacancy	Position in table	Replaced with	Date of appointment	Ref.
Mega Soccerbet	(Serbia) Dejan Milojević	1 June 2020	Off-season	(Serbia) Vlada Jovanović	1 June 2020	
Crvena zvezda mts	(Serbia) Dragan Šakota	8 June 2020	Off-season	(Serbia) Saša Obradović	10 June 2020	
Partizan NIS	(Italy) Andrea Trinchieri	2 July 2020	Off-season	(Montenegro) Vlado Šćepanović	9 July 2020	
Partizan NIS	(Montenegro) Vlado Šćepanović	30 October 2020	Off-season	(Serbia) Milivoje Lazić (interim)	30 October 2020	
Partizan NIS	(Serbia) Milivoje Lazić (interim)	5 November 2020	Off-season	(Slovenia) Sašo Filipovski	5 November 2020	
FMP	(Serbia) Vladimir Jovanović	14 December 2020	Off-season	(Serbia) Bojan Đerić (interim)	14 December 2020	
Crvena zvezda mts	(Serbia) Saša Obradović	24 December 2020	Off-season	(Montenegro) Dejan Radonjić	25 December 2020	
FMP	(Serbia) Bojan Đerić (interim)	13 February 2021	Off-season	(Serbia) Vanja Guša	13 February 2021	
Partizan NIS	(Slovenia) Sašo Filipovski	9 March 2021	Off-season	(Serbia) Aleksandar Matović	9 March 2021	

== Playoffs ==
The playoffs are scheduled to start on May 27, 2021, and end on June 13, 2021.

=== Bracket ===
Quarterfinals
31 May–1 June
Crvena zvezda mts	2
Zlatibor	0
27–29 May
FMP	0
Borac	2
27–29 May
Mega Soccerbet	2
Vojvodina	0
27–29 May
Partizan NIS	2
Mladost MaxBet	0

Semifinals
4–6 June
Crvena zvezda mts	2
Borac	0
1–5 June
Mega Soccerbet	2
Partizan NIS	1

Final
9–13 June
Crvena zvezda mts	2
Mega Soccerbet	1

=== Quarterfinals ===
Team 1	Series	Team 2	Game 1	Game 2	Game 3
Crvena zvezda mts	2–0	Zlatibor	74–56	91–68	—
FMP	0–2	Borac	67–77	85–92	—
Mega Soccerbet	2–0	Vojvodina	77–66	95–87	—
Partizan NIS	2–0	Mladost MaxBet	70–50	94–84	—

=== Semifinals ===
Team 1	Series	Team 2	Game 1	Game 2	Game 3
Crvena zvezda mts	2–0	Borac	101–70	80–57	—
Mega Soccerbet	2–1	Partizan NIS	94–86	77–81	82–68

=== Finals ===
Team 1	Series	Team 2	Game 1	Game 2	Game 3
Crvena zvezda mts	2–1	Mega Soccerbet	98–69	79–86	77–65

2020–21 Basketball League of Serbia Champions

Crvena zvezda mts
21st title

== Serbian clubs in European competitions ==
Team	Competition	Progress
Crvena zvezda mts	EuroLeague	Regular season
Partizan NIS	EuroCup	Top 16

== See also ==
- List of current Basketball League of Serbia team rosters
- 2020–21 Second Men's League of Serbia (basketball)
- 2020–21 Radivoj Korać Cup
- 2020–21 ABA League First Division
- 2020–21 ABA League Second Division
- 2020–21 First Women's Basketball League of Serbia
- 2020–21 KK Crvena zvezda season
- 2020–21 KK Partizan season
