= 2020–21 Second Men's League of Serbia (basketball) =

Second League of Serbia
- Season: 2020–21
- Duration: 3 October 2020 – March 2021
- Games played: 22 each
- Teams: 16

Finals
- Champions: Zdravlje
- Runners-up: Slodes

Statistical leaders
Points	(Serbia) Nino Čelebić	22.0
Rebounds	(Serbia) Dejan Bjelić	10.2
Assists	(Serbia) Nino Čelebić	9.0

Records
- Winning streak: Slodes (8 games)
- Losing streak: Vrbas (22 games)
- All statistics correct as of March 23, 2021.

The 2020–21 Second Men's League of Serbia is the 15th season of the Second Basketball League of Serbia, the 2nd-tier men's professional basketball league in Serbia.

The season is the first to be played after the previous season was abandoned due to the COVID-19 pandemic in Serbia. The Basketball Federation of Serbia ruled that the 11 teams from the previous season will stay in the league and the highest-placed clubs from four divisions of the First Regional League will be promoted, while the three highest-placed clubs from the previous season will be promoted to the First League.

== Teams ==
A total of 16 teams participated in the 2020–21 Second Men's League of Serbia, divided into two geographical groups with 8 clubs.

=== Promotion and relegation ===
Teams promoted to the First League (1st-tier)

- Radnički Kragujevac
- Sloga
- Pirot

Teams relegated from the First League (1st-tier)

- None

Teams promoted from the First Regional League (3rd-tier)

- Vrbas
- Slodes
- Klik
- Bor RTB
- Napredak Junior

Teams relegated to the First Regional League (3rd-tier)

- None

Other actions

In August 2020, Zemun withdraw from the 2020–21 season and got relegated to the First Regional League while Spartak failed to fulfill requirements for the Second League and got relegated to the 4th-tier Second Regional League. To fulfill the remaining spots, the Basketball Federation of Serbia gave two wildcards to Borac Zemun and Star.

=== Venues and locations ===
Location of teams in the 2020–21 season

Team	City	Arena	Capacity
Beovuk 72	Belgrade	SC Šumice	2,000
Bor RTB	Bor	USC Bor	3,000
Borac Zemun	Belgrade	Pinki Hall	2,000
Fair Play	Niš	Dušan Radović School Hall	—
Klik	Arilje	Arilje Sports Hall	—
Konstantin	Niš	Čair Sports Center	4,000
Mladost SP	Smederevska Palanka	Vuk Karadžić School Hall	500
Napredak Junior	Kruševac	Kruševac Sports Hall	2,500
Proleter Naftagas	Zrenjanin	Crystal Hall	3,000
Radnički	Belgrade	Radnički SD Hall	—
Slodes	Belgrade	Slodes Hall	2,000
Star	Novi Sad	SPC Vojvodina	1,030
Sveti Đorđe	Žitište	Nikola Tesla School Hall	—
Vrbas	Vrbas	CFK Drago Jovović	2,500
Zdravlje	Leskovac	SRC Dubočica	3,600
Železničar	Čačak	Borac Hall	4,000

=== Head coaches ===
Team	Head coach	Coaching changes
Beovuk 72	(Serbia) Nikola Stanić	—
Bor RTB	(Serbia) Miloš Nejkov	Dejan Aleksić (until Aug 2020)
Borac Zemun	(Serbia) Vedran Popović	—
Fair Play	(Serbia) Vladan Glavinić	Saša Jović (until Aug 2020)
Klik	(Serbia) Miljan Marjanović	—
Konstantin	(Serbia) Marko Cvetković	Marko Cvetković (until Nov 2020); Dušan Radović (Nov 2020 – N/A)
Mladost SP	(Serbia) Zlatan Rakić	Milovan Bogojević (until Aug 2020)
Napredak Junior	(Serbia) Ljubiša Damjanović	Vladimir Mišković (until Aug 2020)
Proleter Naftagas	(Serbia) Stefan Atanacković	—
Radnički	(Serbia) Nebojša Knežević	Goran Vučković (until Aug 2020)
Slodes	(Serbia) Marko Boras	—
Sveti Đorđe	(Serbia) Nenad Vignjević	—
Star	(Serbia) Dimitrije Živković	—
Vrbas	(Serbia) Petar Bodrožić	Bojan Marković (until Aug 2020)
Zdravlje	(Serbia) Lazar Spasić	—
Železničar	(Serbia) Aleksandar Bjelić	Branko Jorović (until Jul 2020)

== Regular season ==
=== Group North ===
Pos	Team	Pld	W	L	PF	PA	PD	Pts	Qualification or relegation
1	Slodes	14	12	2	1236	1051	+185	26	Qualification to Playoff
2	Proleter Naftagas	14	9	5	1081	984	+97	23 (Note: Proleter Naftagas 151–141 Beovuk 72)	Qualification to Playoff
3	Beovuk 72	14	9	5	1109	1061	+48	23	Qualification to Playoff
4	Borac	14	8	6	1176	1162	+14	22	Qualification to Playoff
5	Star	14	6	8	1086	1112	−26	20 (Note: Star 3–1, Radnički 2–2, Sveti Đorđe 1–3)	Qualification to Playout
6	Radnički	14	6	8	1164	1115	+49	20	Qualification to Playout
7	Sveti Đorđe	14	6	8	1037	1086	−49	20	Qualification to Playout
8	Vrbas	14	0	14	912	1230	−318	14	Qualification to Playout

Source: SrbijaSport, KSS Report

=== Group South ===
Pos	Team	Pld	W	L	PF	PA	PD	Pts	Qualification or relegation
1	Zdravlje	14	9	5	1110	1035	+75	23 (Note: Zdravlje 167–162 Klik)	Qualification to Playoff
2	Klik	14	9	5	1109	1063	+46	23	Qualification to Playoff
3	Železničar	14	8	6	1003	1041	−38	22 (Note: Železničar 3–1, Fair Play 2–2, Konstantin 1–3)	Qualification to Playoff
4	Fair Play	14	8	6	1147	1113	+34	22	Qualification to Playoff
5	Konstantin	14	8	6	1050	989	+61	22	Qualification to Playout
6	Napredak Junior	14	7	7	1010	976	+34	21	Qualification to Playout
7	Mladost SP	14	5	9	1097	1108	−11	19	Qualification to Playout
8	Bor RTB	14	2	12	916	1117	−201	16	Qualification to Playout

Source: SrbijaSport, KSS Report

== Post-season ==
=== Playoff ===
Pos	Team	Pld	W	L	PF	PA	PD	Pts	Qualification or relegation
1	Zdravlje	14	11	3	1196	1066	+130	25	Qualification to First League
2	Slodes	14	9	5	1129	1044	+85	23 (Note: Slodes 144–134 Fair Play)	Qualification to First League
3	Fair Play	14	9	5	1133	1036	+97	23	
4	Klik	14	8	6	1170	1119	+51	22	
5	Železničar	14	7	7	1092	1119	−27	21	
6	Proleter Naftagas	14	6	8	1063	1057	+6	20	
7	Beovuk 72	14	4	10	1077	1224	−147	18	
8	Borac	14	2	12	1009	1204	−195	16	

Source: SrbijaSport, KSS

=== Playout ===
Pos	Team	Pld	W	L	PF	PA	PD	Pts	Qualification or relegation
1	Konstantin	14	9	5	1177	1046	+131	23	
2	Napredak Junior	14	9	5	1052	999	+53	23	
3	Mladost SP	14	9	5	1149	1079	+70	23	
4	Star	14	9	5	1103	1094	+9	23	
5	Radnički	14	8	6	1129	1002	+127	22	Relegation to Regional Leagues
6	Sveti Đorđe	14	6	8	1082	1125	−43	20	Relegation to Regional Leagues
7	Bor RTB	14	6	8	969	1008	−39	20	Relegation to Regional Leagues
8	Vrbas	14	0	14	876	1184	−308	14	Relegation to Regional Leagues

Source: SrbijaSport, KSS

== See also ==
- 2020–21 Basketball League of Serbia
- 2020–21 Basketball Cup of Serbia
