= 2019–20 Second Men's League of Serbia (basketball) =

14th season of the Second Basketball League of Serbia

Second League of Serbia
- Season: 2019–20
- Duration: 5 October 2019 – 15 March 2020
- Teams: 14

Finals
- Champions: None declared

Statistical leaders
Points	(Serbia) Filip Barna	23.1
Rebounds	(Serbia) Filip Barna	9.1
Assists	(Serbia) Vladimir Veličković	7.6
Index Rating	(Serbia) Filip Barna	29.7
- All statistics correct as of May 25, 2020.

The 2018–19 Second Men's League of Serbia is the 14th season of the Second Basketball League of Serbia, the 2nd-tier men's professional basketball league in Serbia.

On 16 March 2020, the Basketball Federation of Serbia temporarily suspended its competitions due to the COVID-19 pandemic. On 2 June, the Federation canceled definitely the season due to the COVID-19 pandemic.

== Teams ==
=== Promotion and relegation ===
Teams promoted to the First League (1st-tier)

- Kolubara LA 2003
- Napredak JKP

Teams relegated from the First League (1st-tier)

- Spartak
- Beovuk 72

Teams promoted from the First Regional League (3rd-tier)

- Radnički Beograd
- Sveti Đorđe
- Fair Play
- Železničar

Teams relegated to the First Regional League (3rd-tier)

- Vrbas
- Rtanj
- Žarkovo
- Plana

=== Venues and locations ===
Location of teams in the 2019–20 season

Team	City	Arena	Capacity
Beovuk 72	Belgrade	SC Šumice	2,000
Fair Play	Niš	Dušan Radović School Hall	
Konstantin	Niš	Čair Sports Center	4,000
Mladost SP	Smederevska Palanka	Vuk Karadžić School Hall	500
Pirot	Pirot	Pirot Kej Hall	835
Proleter Naftagas	Zrenjanin	Crystal Hall	3,000
Radnički Beograd	Belgrade	SC Šumice	1,000
Radnički Kragujevac	Kragujevac	Jezero Hall	3,750
Sloga	Kraljevo	Kraljevo Sports Hall	3,350
Spartak	Subotica	SC Dudova Šuma	3,000
Sveti Đorđe	Žitište	Nikola Tesla School Hall	
Zdravlje	Leskovac	SRC Dubočica	3,600
Zemun Fitofarmacija	Belgrade	Pinki Hall	5,000
Železničar	Čačak	Borac Hall	4,000

=== Head coaches ===
Team	Head coach	Former head coaches
Beovuk 72	(Serbia) Nikola Stanić	—N/a
Fair Play	(Serbia) Saša Jović	Srećko Sekulović (until Nov 2019)
Konstantin	(Serbia) Marko Cvetković	—N/a
Mladost SP	(Serbia) Milovan Bogojević	—N/a
Pirot	(Serbia) Marko Spasić	—N/a
Proleter Naftagas	(Serbia) Stefan Atanacković	—N/a
Radnički Beograd	(Serbia) Goran Vučković	—N/a
Radnički Kragujevac	(Serbia) Igor Todorović	—N/a
Sloga	(Serbia) Saša Pavlović	—N/a
Spartak	(Serbia) Blagoja Ivić	Slobodan Bjelica (until Jan 2020)
Sveti Đorđe	(Serbia) Nenad Vignjević	—N/a
Zdravlje	(Serbia) Lazar Spasić	—N/a
Zemun Fitofarmacija	(Serbia) Nenad Stefanović	—N/a
Železničar	(Serbia) Branko Jorović	(Serbia) Željko Bugarčić (until Dec 2019)

== League table ==
Pos	Team	Pld	W	L	PF	PA	PD	Pts	Qualification or relegation
1	Radnički Kragujevac	22	20	2	2112	1701	+411	42	Promoted to First League
2	Sloga	22	19	3	1836	1601	+235	41	Promoted to First League
3	Pirot	22	15	7	1776	1693	+83	37	Promoted to First League
4	Radnički Beograd	22	14	8	1889	1798	+91	36	
5	Zemun Fitofarmacija	22	14	8	1899	1843	+56	36	
6	Mladost SP	22	12	10	1796	1788	+8	34	
7	Spartak	22	11	11	1841	1876	−35	33	
8	Proleter Naftagas	22	10	12	1617	1702	−85	32	
9	Zdravlje	22	9	13	1835	1797	+38	31	
10	Železničar	22	8	14	1738	1816	−78	30	
11	Konstantin	22	7	15	1648	1812	−164	29	
12	Fair Play	22	7	15	1703	1863	−160	29	
13	Sveti Đorđe	22	6	16	1693	1815	−122	28	
14	Beovuk 72	22	2	20	1685	1963	−278	24	

Source: srbijasport.net

== See also ==
- 2019–20 Basketball League of Serbia
- 2019–20 Basketball Cup of Serbia
