= 2019–20 Basketball League of Serbia =

Basketball League of Serbia
- Season: 2019–20
- Duration: October 5, 2019 – March 15, 2020
- Teams: 18
- TV partner: Arena Sport

Finals
- Champions: None declared
- All statistics correct as of May 1, 2019.

The 2019–20 Basketball League of Serbia (Serbian Cyrillic: Кошаркашка лига Србије 2019–20.) is the 14th season of the Basketball League of Serbia, the highest professional basketball league in Serbia. Also, it's the 76th national championship played by Serbian clubs inclusive of nation's previous incarnations as Yugoslavia and Serbia & Montenegro.

The regular season began in October 2019 and ended in March 2020. The SuperLeague season was suspended prior to its start due to the COVID-19 pandemic. On 28 May 2020, the League Assembly canceled definitely the season due to the COVID-19 pandemic.

Crvena zvezda mts was the defending champion and as a consequence of the COVID-19 pandemic, the League Assembly decided not to recognize any team as the champion for the season. The SuperLeague season would have been played in April and May 2020. The playoffs would have been played in June 2020.

== Teams ==
=== Distribution ===
The following is the access list for this season.

Access list for 2019–20 Serbian League
	Teams entering in this round	Teams advancing from the previous round
First League (14 teams)	12 highest-placed teams from the last season; 2 highest-placed teams from the Second League	
Super League (12 teams)	4 Adriatic League teams (Crvena zvezda mts, FMP, Mega Bemax, Partizan NIS)	8 highest-placed teams from the First League
Playoffs (4 teams)		2 group winners from the Super League; 2 group runners-up from the Super League

=== Promotion and relegation ===
Teams promoted from the Second League

- Kolubara LA 2003
- Napredak JKP

Teams relegated to the Second League

- Beovuk 72
- Spartak

=== Venues and locations ===
Location of teams in the 2019–20 season

Team	Home city	Arena	Capacity
Borac	Čačak	Borac Hall	2,000
Crvena zvezda mts	Belgrade	Aleksandar Nikolić Hall	5,878
Dunav	Stari Banovci	Park Hall	
Dynamic VIP PAY	Belgrade	Ranko Žeravica Hall	5,000
FMP	Belgrade	Železnik Hall	3,000
Kolubara LA 2003	Lazarevac	SRC Kolubara	1,700
Mega Bemax	Belgrade	Mega Factory	700
Metalac	Valjevo	Valjevo Sports Hall	1,500
Mladost	Zemun	Master Sport Center	750
Napredak JKP	Aleksinac	Aleksinac Sports Hall	1,400
Novi Pazar	Novi Pazar	Pendik Sports Hall	1,600
OKK Beograd	Belgrade	Mega Factory	700
Partizan NIS	Belgrade	Štark Arena	18,386
Sloboda	Užice	Veliki Park Hall	2,200
Tamiš	Pančevo	Strelište Sports Hall	1,100
Vojvodina	Novi Sad	SPC Vojvodina	7,022
Vršac	Vršac	Millennium Center	4,400
Zlatibor	Čajetina	WAI TAI - STC Zlatibor	712

Teams that play in the 2019–20 First Adriatic League
Teams that play in the 2019–20 Second Adriatic League

=== Personnel and sponsorship ===
Team	Head coach	Captain	Kit manufacturer	Shirt sponsor
Borac	(Serbia) Marko Marinović	(Serbia) Uroš Čarapić	—	P.S. Fashion
Dunav	(Serbia) Mitar Ašćerić	(Serbia) Aleksandar Miljković	Cvetex	Best Shop Group
Dynamic VIP PAY	(Slovenia) Miro Alilović	(Serbia) Dušan Beslać	Champion	VIP PAY
Kolubara LA 2003	(Serbia) Dušan Radović	(Serbia) Nikola Simić	—	—
Metalac	(Serbia) Vladimir Đokić	(Serbia) Aleksandar Vasić	—	—
Mladost	(Serbia) Dragan Jakovljević	(Serbia) Lazar Stefanović	—	—
Napredak JKP	(Serbia) Nebojša Raičević	(Serbia) Nikola Raičević	—	—
Novi Pazar	(Serbia) Oliver Popović	(Serbia) Asmir Numanović	Cvetex	Barbosa
OKK Beograd	(Serbia) Branko Milisavljević	(Serbia)	Adidas	—
Sloboda	(Serbia) Vladimir Lučić	(Serbia) Petar Marić	—	—
Tamiš	(Serbia) Bojan Jovičić	(Serbia) Saša Radović	unit-sport	Grad Pančevo
Vojvodina	(Serbia) Filip Socek	(Serbia) Aleksa Zarić	Peak	Roda
Vršac	(Serbia) Zoran Todorović	(Montenegro) Miloš Savović	Spirit	Villager
Zlatibor	(Serbia) Strajin Nedović	(Montenegro) Radomir Marojević	Ardu	Dino park

=== Coaching changes ===
Round	Team	Outgoing coach	Date(s) of change	Incoming coach	Ref.
Off-season	OKK Beograd	(Serbia) Branislav Vićentić	7 June 2019	(Serbia) Branko Milisavljević	
Off-season	Borac	(Serbia) Jovica Arsić	29 June 2019	(Serbia) Marko Marinović	
Off-season	Mladost Zemun	(Serbia) Marko Barać	24 July 2019	(Serbia) Dragan Jakovljević	
Off-season	Metalac	(Serbia) Mihailo Poček	27 September 2019	(Serbia) Vladimir Đokić	
Off-season	Vojvodina	(Serbia) Filip Socek	September 2019	(Serbia) Marko Skoko	
6th	Kolubara LA 2003	(Serbia) Žarko Simić	November 2019	(Serbia) Dušan Radović	
7th	Vojvodina	(Serbia) Marko Skoko	November 2019	(Serbia) Filip Socek	
18th	Vršac	(Greece) Darko Kostić	6 February 2020	(Serbia) Zoran Todorović	

== First League ==
=== League table ===
Pos	Team	Pld	W	L	PF	PA	PD	Pts	Qualification or relegation
1	Borac	26	23	3	2291	1996	+295	49	Qualified to 2020–21 ABA 1
2	Sloboda	26	20	6	2360	2154	+206	46	Qualification to 2020–21 ABA 2
3	Zlatibor	26	17	9	2334	2171	+163	43	Qualification to 2020–21 ABA 2
4	Novi Pazar	26	17	9	2333	2259	+74	43	
5	Dynamic VIP PAY	26	16	10	2224	2080	+144	42	
6	Mladost	26	15	11	2299	2339	−40	41	Promotion to 2020–21 ABA 2
7	Napredak JKP	26	11	15	2072	2027	+45	37	
8	Metalac	26	10	16	2087	2215	−128	36	
9	Kolubara LA 2003	26	10	16	2089	2250	−161	36	
10	Dunav	26	10	16	2116	2232	−116	36	
11	Tamiš	26	10	16	1986	2056	−70	36	
12	Vršac	26	9	17	2081	2176	−95	35	
13	OKK Beograd	26	9	17	2099	2149	−50	35	
14	Vojvodina	26	5	21	2159	2426	−267	31	

Source: SrbijaSport

== Serbian clubs in European competitions ==
Team	Competition	Progress
Crvena zvezda mts	EuroLeague	Regular season
Partizan NIS	EuroCup	Quarterfinals

== See also ==
- List of current Basketball League of Serbia team rosters
- 2019–20 Second Men's League of Serbia (basketball)
- 2019–20 Radivoj Korać Cup
- 2019–20 ABA League First Division
- 2019–20 ABA League Second Division
- 2019–20 First Women's Basketball League of Serbia
