= 2017–18 Basketball League of Serbia B =

Second League of Serbia
- Season: 2017–18
- Duration: October 7, 2017 – April 22, 2018
- Games played: 182
- Teams: 14

Finals
- Champions: Sloboda
- Runners-up: Novi Pazar

Statistical leaders
Points	(Serbia) Nikola Kostić	21.7
Rebounds	(Serbia) Darko Rnić	10.9
Assists	(Serbia) Sanel Mukanović	7.0
Index Rating	(Serbia) Darko Rnić	28.1
- All statistics correct as of June 4, 2018.

The 2017–18 Basketball League of Serbia B is the 12th season of the Second Basketball League of Serbia, the 2nd-tier men's professional basketball league in Serbia.

== Teams ==
=== Promotion and relegation ===
Teams promoted to the First League (1st-tier)

- Zlatibor
- Vojvodina

Teams relegated from the First League (1st-tier)

- Smederevo 1953
- Konstantin

Teams promoted from the First Regional League (3rd-tier)

- Akademik
- Žarkovo
- Klik
- Zdravlje

Teams relegated to the First Regional League (3rd-tier)

- Futog Tupanjac MD
- Srem
- Jagodina
- Rtanj

=== Venues and locations ===
Location of teams in the 2017–18 season

Team	City	Arena	Capacity
Smederevo 1953	Smederevo	Smederevo Hall	2,800
Konstantin	Niš	Čair Sports Center	4,000
Plana	Velika Plana	TSC Velika Plana	1,000
Proleter Naftagas	Zrenjanin	Medison Hall	3,000
Pirot	Pirot	Pirot Kej Hall	835
Napredak Bosphorus	Aleksinac	Aleksinac Sports Hall	1,000
Sloboda	Užice	Veliki Park Hall	2,200
Mladost SP	Smederevska Palanka	Vuk Karadžić School Hall	500
Kolubara LA 2003	Lazarevac	Lazarevac Sports Hall	1,700
Novi Pazar	Novi Pazar	Pendik Sports Hall	1,600
Akademik	Srbobran	Srbobran Sports Hall	750
Žarkovo	Belgrade	Žarkovo Sports Hall	800
Klik	Arilje	Arilje Sports Hall	525
Zdravlje	Leskovac	SRC Dubočica	3,600

== League table ==
Pos	Team	Pld	W	L	PF	PA	PD	Pts	Qualification or relegation
1	Sloboda	26	23	3	2278	1976	+302	49	Promoted to the First League
2	Novi Pazar	26	21	5	2146	1843	+303	47	Promoted to the First League
3	Mladost SP	26	20	6	2051	1820	+231	46	
4	Pirot	26	15	11	2109	2043	+66	41	
5	Napredak Bosphorus	26	14	12	2174	2007	+167	40	
6	Žarkovo	26	14	12	2062	1954	+108	40	
7	Klik	26	14	12	1988	1884	+104	40	
8	Proleter Naftagas	26	14	12	2081	2035	+46	40	
9	Zdravlje	26	12	14	2147	2219	−72	38	
10	Kolubara LA 2003	26	12	14	2049	2087	−38	38	
11	Plana	26	9	17	2033	2239	−206	35	Relegation to the Regional Leagues
12	Akademik	26	7	19	2008	2163	−155	33	Relegation to the Regional Leagues
13	Konstantin	26	5	21	1767	2199	−432	31	Relegation to the Regional Leagues
14	Smederevo 1953	26	2	24	1860	2284	−424	28	Relegation to the Regional Leagues

Source: Second League of Serbia

== Statistics ==
=== Individual statistic leaders ===
Category	Player	Team	Statistic
Points per game	(Serbia) Nikola Kostić	Plana	21.7
Rebounds per game	(Serbia) Darko Rnić	Smederevo 1953	10.9
Assists per game	(Serbia) Sanel Mukanović	Novi Pazar	7.0
Steals per game	(Serbia) Stefan Stanisavljević	Napredak Bosphorus	2.4
Blocks per game	(Serbia) Nemanja Arsić	Mladost SP	2.6

Source: Eurobasket

== See also ==
- 2017–18 Basketball League of Serbia
