= 2018–19 Second Men's League of Serbia (basketball) =

Basketball tournament season

Second League of Serbia
- Season: 2018–19
- Duration: September 28, 2018 – April 13, 2019
- Teams: 14

Regular season
- Relegated: Vrbas; Rtanj; Žarkovo; Plana

Finals
- Champions: Kolubara LA 2003
- Runners-up: Napredak JKP

Statistical leaders
Points	(Serbia) Ivan Đurović	23.6
Rebounds	(Serbia) Mihailo Todorović	13.5
Assists	(Serbia) Sanel Mukanović	8.3
Index Rating	(Serbia) Aleksandar Petrović	28.4

Records
- Losing streak: Plana; 26 games
- All statistics correct as of April 15, 2019.

The 2018–19 Second Men's League of Serbia is the 13th season of the Second Basketball League of Serbia, the 2nd-tier men's professional basketball league in Serbia.

== Teams ==
=== Promotion and relegation ===
Teams promoted to the First League (1st-tier)

- Sloboda
- Novi Pazar

Teams relegated from the First League (1st-tier)

- Radnički
- Sloga

Teams promoted from the First Regional League (3rd-tier)

- Vrbas
- Zemun Fitofarmacija
- Rtanj
- ~~Zlatar~~

Teams relegated to the First Regional League (3rd-tier)

- ~~Plana~~
- Akademik
- ~~Konstantin~~
- Smederevo 1953

=== Suspensions ===
In July 2018, the Basketball Federation of Serbia did not issued the competitions licenses to Klik and KK Zlatar for competing in the 2018–19 season due to unfulfilled requirements of the competition. Thus, KK Plana and OKK Konstantin were to stay in the league.

=== Venues and locations ===
Location of teams in the 2018–19 season

Team	City	Arena	Capacity
Radnički	Kragujevac	Jezero Hall	3,750
Sloga	Kraljevo	Kraljevo Sports Hall	3,350
Proleter Naftagas	Zrenjanin	Crystal Hall	3,000
Pirot	Pirot	Pirot Kej Hall	835
Napredak JKP	Aleksinac	Aleksinac Sports Hall	1,000
Mladost SP	Smederevska Palanka	Vuk Karadžić School Hall	500
Kolubara LA 2003	Lazarevac	SRC Kolubara Hall	1,700
Konstantin	Niš	Čair Sports Center	4,000
Plana	Velika Plana	TSC Velika Plana	1,000
Žarkovo	Belgrade	Žarkovo Sports Hall	800
Zdravlje	Leskovac	SRC Dubočica	3,600
Vrbas	Vrbas	CFK Drago Jovović	
Zemun Fitofarmacija	Belgrade	Pinki Hall	5,000
Rtanj	Boljevac	Boljevac Sports Hall	

== League table ==
Pos	Team	Pld	W	L	PF	PA	PD	Pts	Qualification or relegation
1	Kolubara LA 2003	26	21	5	2264	1965	+299	47	Promoted to the First League
2	Napredak JKP	26	21	5	2001	1768	+233	47	Promoted to the First League
3	Mladost SP	26	18	8	2130	1968	+162	44	
4	Sloga	26	15	11	2031	2000	+31	41	
5	Konstantin	26	15	11	2155	2030	+125	41	
6	Pirot	26	14	12	2139	2078	+61	40	
7	Zemun Fitofarmacija	26	14	12	2008	1940	+68	40	
8	Zdravlje	26	14	12	2069	1970	+99	40	
9	Radnički	26	13	13	2227	2075	+152	39	
10	Proleter Naftagas	26	12	14	2039	2029	+10	38	
11	Vrbas	26	11	15	1804	2010	−206	37	Relegation to the Regional Leagues
12	Rtanj	26	9	17	1993	2085	−92	35	Relegation to the Regional Leagues
13	Žarkovo	26	5	21	1955	2269	−314	31	Relegation to the Regional Leagues
14	Plana	26	0	26	1638	2266	−628	26	Relegation to the Regional Leagues

Source: eurobasket.com

== Statistics ==
=== Individual statistic leaders ===
Category	Player	Team	Statistic
Points per game	(Serbia) Ivan Đurović	Vrbas	23.6
Rebounds per game	(Serbia) Mihailo Todorović	Plana	13.5
Assists per game	(Serbia) Sanel Mukanović	Pirot	8.3
Steals per game	(Serbia) Petar Šparović	Kolubara LA 2003	2.9
Blocks per game	(Serbia) Dušan Miletić	Sloga	1.6

Source: Eurobasket

== See also ==
- 2018–19 Basketball League of Serbia
- 2018–19 Basketball Cup of Serbia
