= 2010–11 Basketball League of Serbia B =

Basketball League of Serbia B
- Season: 2010–11
- Duration: 2 October 2010 – 17 April 2011
- Games played: 22 each
- Teams: 16
- TV partner: SOS kanal

Finals
- Champions: BKK Radnički
- Runners-up: Radnički Basket

Statistical leaders
Points	(Serbia) Dragan Bjelica	26.6
Rebounds	(Serbia) Nemanja Knežević	10.2
Assists	(Serbia) Dragan Bjelica	6.7
- All statistics correct as of April 16, 2021.

The 2010–11 Basketball League of Serbia B is the 5th season of the Basketball League of Serbia B, the second professional basketball league in Serbia. The 182-game regular season (26 games for each of the 14 teams) began on Saturday, October 2, 2010, and will end on Sunday, April 17, 2011.

== Teams ==
=== Promotion and relegation ===
Promoted to Basketball League of Serbia B

- BKK Radnički
- Niš
- Spartak
- KG Student

Relegated to Serbian First League

- Jug
- Vrbas
- Zdravlje
- Beovuk 72

=== Venues and locations ===
Team	City	Arena	Capacity
Radnički Beograd	Belgrade		
Radnički Basket	Belgrade	Basket City Hall	1,700
Železničar	Inđija	Inđija Hall	600
Spartak	Subotica	Dudova Šuma Hall	3,000
Smederevo Vizura	Smederevo	Smederevo Hall	3,000
Viva Basket	Belgrade		
KG Student	Kragujevac	Veliki Park Hall	500
Sinđelić	Niš	Čair Sports Center	4,000
Vojvodina Novi Sad	Novi Sad		
Radnički Obrenovac	Obrenovac	Obrenovac Hall	1,500
Mladost	Čačak		
Jagodina	Jagodina	JASSA Sports Center	2,500
Niš	Niš	Čair Sports Center	4,000
Radnički KG 06	Kragujevac	Jezero Hall	4,000

== Regular season ==
Pos	Team	P	W	L	F	A	D	Pts
1	BKK Radnički	19	17	2	1646	1288	+358	36
2	Radnički Basket	19	15	4	1470	1253	+217	34
3	Železničar	19	13	6	1562	1488	+74	32
4	Spartak	19	12	7	1676	1518	+158	31
5	Smederevo Vizura	19	11	8	1611	1560	+ 51	30
6	KG Student	19	11	8	1534	1503	+ 31	30
7	Viva Basket	19	10	9	1579	1597	-18	29
8	Sinđelić	19	9	10	1458	1542	84	28
9	Vojvodina	19	9	10	1500	1532	32	28
10	Radnički	19	8	11	1493	1479	+ 14	27
11	Mladost	19	8	11	1473	1573	100	27
12	Jagodina	19	6	13	1461	1575	114	25
13	Niš	19	4	15	1348	1547	199	23
14	Radnički KG 06	19	0	19	1391	1747	355	19

P=Matches played, W=Matches won, L=Matches lost, F=Points for, A=Points against, D=Points difference, Pts=Points

Promotion to Basketball League of Serbia
Relegation to Serbian First League

Source: SrbijaSport
