= KK Fair Play =

Defunct basketball club in Niš, Serbia

Fair Play
- Founded: March 23, 2017; 9 years ago
- Dissolved: May 2021; 5 years ago
- History: KK Fair Play (2017–2021)
- Arena: Dušan Radović School Hall
- Location: Niš, Serbia
- Team colors: Purple and Orange

Košarkaški klub Fair Play (Serbian Cyrillic: Кошаркашки клуб Фер Плеј), commonly referred to as KK Fair Play, was a men's basketball club based in Niš, Serbia. In 2021, it was merged into Subotica-based team Spartak.

== History ==
In the inaugural season (2017–18), the club won the Second Regional League of Serbia, East Division, and got promoted to the First Regional League of Serbia, East Division. In the 2018–19 season, they won the First Regional League and got promoted to the Second Basketball League of Serbia for the 2019–20 season.

In May 2021, there were talks to merge into a Subotica-based club Spartak. In August 2021, the Basketball Federation of Serbia confirmed a disaffiliation of the club and theirs merge into Spartak.

== Head coaches ==
- (Serbia) Ljubiša Damjanović (2017–2019)
- (Serbia) Srećko Sekulović (2019)
- (Serbia) Saša Jović (2019–2020)
- (Serbia) Vladan Glavinić (2020–2021)

== Season by season ==
Season	Tier	Division	Pos.	Postseason	W–L	National Cup
2017–18	4	Second Regional League ED	1	—N/a	18–0	—
2018–19	3	First Regional League ED	1	—	23–3	—
2019–20	2	Second League of Serbia	12	Abd	7–15	—
2020–21	2	Second League of Serbia	4	Third	17–11	—

== Trophies and awards ==
=== Trophies ===
- First Regional League, East Division (3rd-tier)
  - Winners (1): 2018–19
- Second Regional League, East Division (4th-tier)
  - Winners (1): 2017–18

== See also ==
Basketball clubs in Niš

- Konstantin
- Ergonom (defunct)
