= KK Napredak (disambiguation) =

KK Napredak may refer to:

- Basketball teams in Serbia
  - KK Napredak Kruševac, based in Kruševac (1946–present)
  - KK Napredak Aleksinac, based in Aleksinac (1957–present)
