= Dušan Beslać =

Serbian basketball player

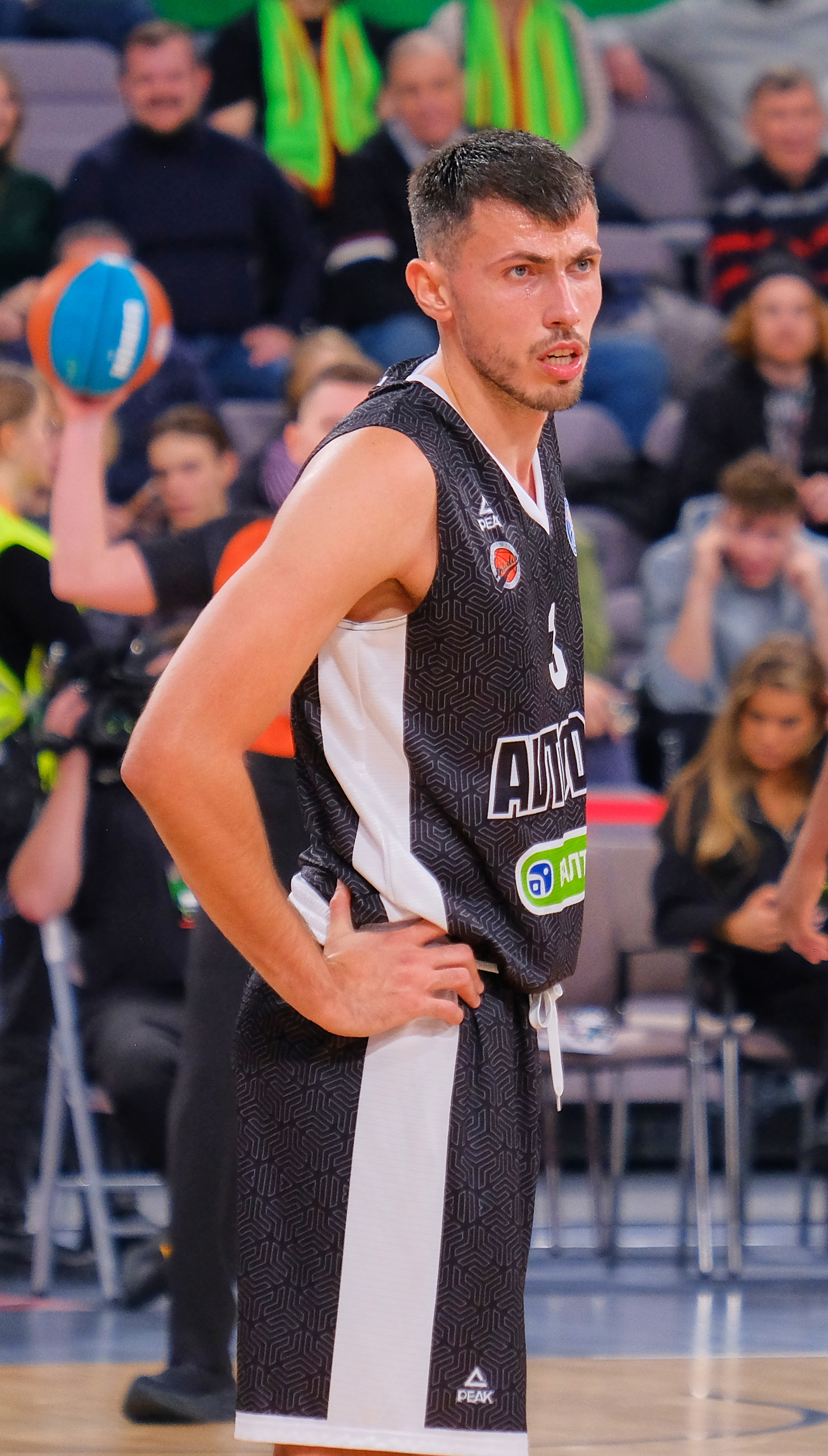
- Beslać with the BC Avtodor (2024)

No. 3 – U-BT Cluj-Napoca
- Position: Power forward
- League: Liga Națională; ABA League; EuroCup

Personal information
- Born: October 6, 1998 (age 28) Sombor, Serbia, FR Yugoslavia
- Listed height: 2.06 m (6 ft 9 in)
- Listed weight: 103 kg (227 lb)

Career information
- NBA draft: 2020: undrafted
- Playing career: 2015–present

Career history
- 2015–2016: Smederevo 1953
- 2016–2020: Dynamic BG
- 2020–2023: Vojvodina
- 2023–2026: Avtodor
- 2026–present: U-BT Cluj-Napoca

Career highlights
- Serbian League Cup winner (2021)

Dušan Beslać (Serbian Cyrillic: Душан Беслаћ; born October 6, 1998) is a Serbian professional basketball player for U-BT Cluj-Napoca of the Romanian Liga Națională, the ABA League and the EuroCup. He is part of Serbian qualifications team, also won an MVP of Serbian League in the 2022–23 season.

== Playing career ==
During the 2015–16 season, he played for Smederevo 1953. In 2016, he joined Dynamic BG.

== International career ==
Beslać was a member of the Serbian U-18 national team that participated at the 2016 FIBA Europe Under-18 Championship and a member of the Serbian U-16 national team that participated at the 2014 FIBA Europe Under-16 Championship.

== Career statistics ==
Legend
GP	Games played	GS	Games started	MPG	Minutes per game
FG%	Field-goal percentage	3P%	3-point field-goal percentage	FT%	Free-throw percentage
RPG	Rebounds per game	APG	Assists per game	SPG	Steals per game
BPG	Blocks per game	PPG	Points per game	PIR	Performance index rating
**Bold**	Career high

=== Domestic leagues ===
Year	Team	League	GP	MPG	FG%	3P%	FT%	RPG	APG	SPG	BPG	PPG
2015–16	Smederevo 1953	KLS	12	11.0	.522	.300	.583	2.0	.3	.1	.0	2.8
2016–17	Dynamic BG	KLS	19	5.6	.484	.357	.714	.5	.3	.2	.1	2.1
2017–18	Dynamic BG	KLS	**36**	13.1	.449	**.411**	.775	2.1	1.0	.4	.6	5.3
2018–19	Dynamic BG	KLS	22	18.0	.433	.367	**.892**	3.0	.4	.6	.6	8.3
2019–20	Dynamic BG	KLS	25	21.0	.504	.380	.731	3.0	1.5	.5	.8	8.2
2020–21	Vojvodina	KLS	30	26.8	**.550**	.323	.750	5.2	1.2	.6	.8	13.4
2021–22	Vojvodina	KLS	24	**30.1**	.475	.344	.815	**7.9**	**1.9**	**1.1**	**1.5**	**16.6**
