= Marko Dimitrijević =

Serbian basketball coach and former player

Sloga
- Title: Head coach
- League: Basketball League of Serbia

Personal information
- Born: 8 February 1978 (age 48) Kraljevo, SR Serbia, SFR Yugoslavia
- Listed height: 1.90 m (6 ft 3 in)

Career information
- NBA draft: 2000: undrafted
- Playing career: 1996–2013
- Position: Guard
- Number: 5, 10
- Coaching career: 2014–present

Career history

Playing
- 2001–2002: Sloga
- 2002: Pardubice
- 2002–2003: Igokea
- 2003–2004: Konstantin
- 2004–2006: Mašinac
- 2008: Gaz Metan Mediaș
- 2008–2009: Feni Industries
- 2009–2011: Sloga
- 2011–2012: Tamiš
- 2012–2013: Smederevo 1953

Coaching
- 2014–2016: Polet Ratina
- 2016–2017: Mladost SP
- 2017: Novi Pazar
- 2018–2019: Zdravlje
- 2019–2020: Anibal (assistant)
- 2020–2021: Kolubara LA 2003
- 2021–present: Sloga

Marko Dimitrijević (Serbian Cyrillic: Марко Димитријевић; born 8 February 1978) is a Serbian professional basketball coach and former player who is the head coach for Sloga of the Basketball League of Serbia.

== Playing career ==
During his playing days a guard, Dimitrijević played for his hometown teams Sloga and Mašinac, as well as Srem, Partizan, Igokea (Bosnia and Herzegovina), Pardubice (Czech Republic), Gaz Metan Mediaș (Romania), Feni Industries (Macedonia), Tamiš, and Smederevo 1953. Dimitrijevic retired as a player with Smederevo in 2013.

== Coaching career ==
After retirement in 2013, Dimitrijević became the head coach for Polet, a club based in Ratina near his hometown, of the First Regional League of Serbia. Afterward, Dimitrijević had coached Mladost SP before he signed with Novi Pazar on 27 June 2017. In December 2017, he parted ways with Novi Pazar.

Dimitrijević was an assistant coach for the Serbian men's university basketball team at the 2017 Summer Universiade in Taipei. The Serbia squad lost to Latvia in the bronze medal game.

In September 2018, Dimitrijević was hired as the new head coach for Zdravlje.

In August 2020, Dimitrijević became the head coach for Kolubara LA 2003 of the Basketball League of Serbia.
