= Nenad Stefanović =

Serbian basketball coach

- Stefanović in 2026

Igokea m:tel
- Title: Head coach
- League: Bosnian League; ABA League

Personal information
- Born: 31 August 1985 (age 41) Titovo Užice, SR Serbia, Yugoslavia
- Listed height: 1.93 m (6 ft 4 in)

Career information
- NBA draft: 2007: undrafted
- Playing career: 2002–2014
- Position: Point guard / shooting guard
- Coaching career: 2014–present

Career history

Playing
- 2002–2003: OKK Beograd
- 2004–2005: Sloga
- 2005–2006: Partizan
- 2006–2007: OKK Beograd
- 2007–2008: FMP
- 2008: Polpak Swiecie
- 2008: Mogren
- 2008–2009: Borac Čačak
- 2009–2010: Metalac
- 2010: Radnički Kragujevac
- 2010–2011: Tamiš
- 2011–2012: Smederevo 1953
- 2012–2013: Stockholm Eagles
- 2013: Tamiš
- 2013: 08 Stockholm
- 2013–2014: Žarkovo

Coaching
- 2016–2020: Zemun
- 2020–2021: OKK Beograd (assistant)
- 2021–2024: FMP
- 2024–present: Igokea

Career highlights
- As player: YUBA League champion (2006); As head coach: Bosnian League champion (2025); Bosnian Cup winner (2025); First Regional League (Central Division) of Serbia champion (2018)

Nenad Stefanović (Serbian Cyrillic: Ненад Стефановић; born 31 August 1985) is a Serbian professional basketball coach and former player. He is the current head coach for Igokea m:tel of the Bosnian League and the ABA League.

== Playing career ==
A point guard, Stefanović spent his playing career in Serbia, Poland, Montenegro, and Sweden. During his playing days, he played for OKK Beograd, Sloga, Partizan, FMP Železnik, Polpak Swiecie, KK Mogren Budva, Borac Čačak, Metalac, Radnički Kragujevac, Tamiš, Smederevo 1953, Stockholm Eagles, 08 Stockholm, and Žarkovo. He retired as a player with Žarkovo in 2014.

== Coaching career ==
After retirement in 2014, Stefanović joined a youth system of Žarkovo as the U19 head coach. He was also the head coach of Zemun from 2016–2020. He was an assistant coach for OKK Beograd in the 2020–21 Serbian League season.

On 2 June 2021, FMP hired Stefanović as their new head coach. On 15 December 2023, he was fired by the club after 6 straight losses in ABA League.
