= Vladimir Lučić (disambiguation) =

Vladimir Lučić may refer to:

- Vladimir Lučić (born 1989), Serbian basketball player
- Vladimir Lučić (basketball, born 1982), Serbian basketball coach
- Vladimir Lučić (footballer) (born 2002), Serbian footballer
