= KK Bor =

Basketball club in Bor, Serbia

KK Bor RTB
- Leagues: Second League of Serbia
- Founded: May 16, 1952; 73 years ago
- Arena: Sports Center ''Bobana Veličković Momčilović''
- Capacity: 3000
- Location: Bor, Serbia
- Team colors: White and blue
- President: Gojko Džaković
- Head coach: Aleksa Kolar

Košarkaški klub Bor RTB (Serbian Cyrillic: Кошаркашки клуб Бор РТБ), commonly referred to as KK Bor RTB, is a men's basketball club based in Bor, Serbia. It is part of the Bor's multi-sports club. It competes in the Second Basketball League of Serbia.

== History ==
The biggest success in the club's history is reaching placement to the Second Yugoslavia League in 1977, after a 98–97 win over Partizan Jagodina.

== Home arena ==
Bor RTB plays its home games at the Bor Sports Center. The hall is located in Bor, Eastern Serbia. It has a seating capacity of 3,000 seats.

== Head coaches ==
- Dejan Aleksić (2019–2020)
- Miloš Nejkov (2020–2021)
- Dejan Aleksić (2021–2024)
- Aleksa Kolar (2024-present)

== Trophies and awards ==
=== Trophies ===
- Second Regional League, East Division (4th-tier)
  - Winners (1): 2016–17
