= Miloš Trailović =

Serbian basketball player

Personal information
- Born: September 15, 1981 (age 45) Niš, SR Serbia, SFR Yugoslavia
- Listed height: 1.98 m (6 ft 6 in)

Career information
- Playing career: 2003–2019
- Position: Guard

Career history
- 2003–2007: Ergonom Niš
- 2007–2008: Hemofarm
- 2008–2009: MZT Skopje
- 2009–2014: OKK Konstantin
- 2014–2017: Napredak Bosphorus
- 2018–2019: Prokuplje

Miloš Trailović (born September 15, 1981) is a Serbian former professional basketball player.
