= KK Sloboda =

KK Sloboda may refer to the following basketball teams:

== Bosnia and Herzegovina ==
- KK Sloboda Tuzla, based in Tuzla
- KK Sloboda 1973, based in Novi Grad

== Serbia ==
- KK Sloboda Užice, based in Užice (1950–present)
- KK Sloboda Novi Sad, based in Novi Sad
