= Nebojša Raičević =

Serbian basketball coach

Free agent
- Position: Head coach

Personal information
- Born: 1961 (age 64–65) Kruševac, PR Serbia, Yugoslavia

Career information
- NBA draft: 1983: undrafted
- Coaching career: 1994–present

Career history

Playing
- Napredak Kruševac

Coaching
- 1994–1995: Napredak Kruševac
- 1998–1999: Napredak Aleksinac
- OKK Kruševac
- 2013: Al-Muharraq
- 2014–2016: Napredak Kruševac
- 2017–2021: Napredak Aleksinac
Medals
Men's basketball
Head coach for Iran
FIBA Asia Under-18 Championship
Gold medal – first place	2008 Iran	U18 Team

Nebojša Raičević (Serbian Cyrillic: Небојша Раичевић; born 1961) is a Serbian professional basketball coach and former player. Lastly, he was the head coach for Napredak Aleksinac of the Basketball League of Serbia.

== Coaching career ==
In 1999, Raičević founded the basketball club based in his hometown, OKK Kruševac.

In July 2013, Raičević was named the head coach for Al-Muharraq of the Bahraini Premier League.

In 2017, Raičević was hired as the new head coach of Napredak Aleksinac. His team finished second in the Second League of Serbia's 2018–19 season and got promoted to the Basketball League of Serbia for the first time in club's history. He left Napredak in February 2021.

=== National team coaching career ===
Raičević was an assistant coach of the Yugoslavia national under-18 team at the 2000 FIBA Europe Under-18 Championship in Croatia.

Raičević was the head coach of the Iran national U18 team that won the gold medal at the 2008 FIBA Asia Under-18 Championship with a 6–1 record. Also, he was the Iran U19 head coach at the 2009 FIBA Under-19 World Championship in Auckland, New Zealand.
