= List of indoor arenas in Serbia =

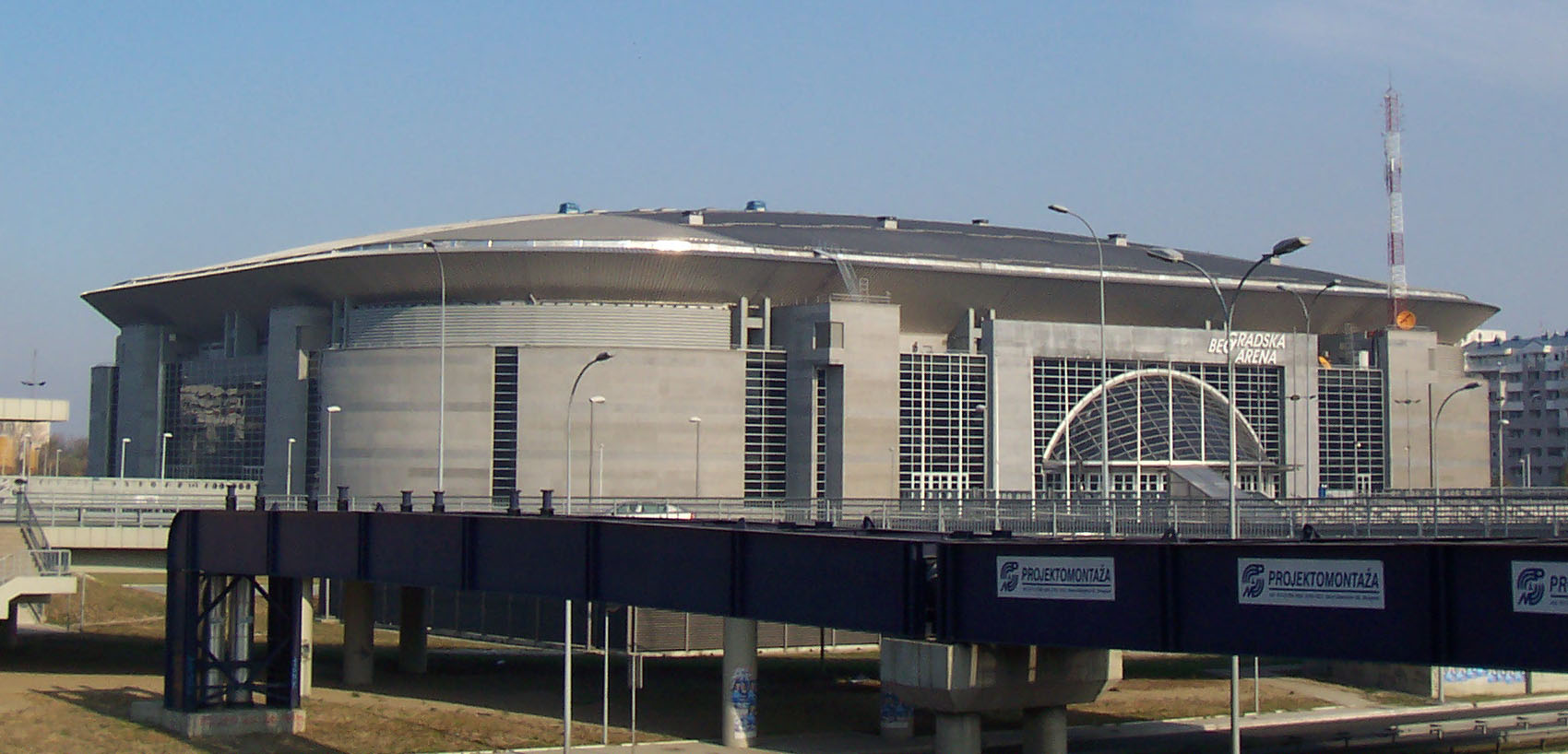
Štark Arena

The following is a list of indoor arenas in Serbia (excluding Kosovo). The Štark Arena is the largest indoor stadium in Serbia. It is the home of KK Crvena zvezda and KK Partizan, two basketball clubs.

== List of indoor arenas ==
Photo	Arena	Capacity	Location	Year opened
	Štark Arena	18,386	Belgrade	2004
	Aleksandar Nikolić Hall	8,000	Belgrade	1973
	SPC Vojvodina	6,987	Novi Sad	1981
	Jezero Hall	5,320	Kragujevac	1978
	Ranko Žeravica Sports Hall	5,000	Belgrade	1968
	SC Čair	5,000	Niš	1974
	Millennium Centar	4,400	Vršac	2001
	Borac Hall	1,500	Čačak	1969
	SRC Dubočica	3,400	Leskovac	1983
	Kraljevo Sports Hall	3,000-6,000	Kraljevo	2015
	Železnik Hall	3,000	Belgrade	1995
	SC Bor	3,000	Bor	1986
	Vranje Hall	3,000	Vranje	1989
	Crystal Hall	2,800	Zrenjanin	2009
	Zvonimir Zvonko Vujin Hall	2,800	Zrenjanin	1961
	Smederevo Hall	2,600	Smederevo	2009
	JASSA Sports Center	2,600	Jagodina	1978
	SC Požarevac	2,506	Požarevac	1983
	SC Dudova šuma	2,500	Subotica	1968
	Kruševac Sports Hall	2,500	Kruševac	1977
	SC Ruma	2,500	Ruma	1991
	SPC Pinki	2,500	Sremska Mitrovica	1987
	SRC Kraljevica	2,360	Zaječar	1976
	Pinki Hall	2,300	Belgrade	1974
	Zorka Hall	2,300	Šabac	1976
	Lagator Hall	2,236	Loznica	1984
	Slodes Hall	2000	Belgrade	1995
	Veliki Park Hall	2,200	Užice	1975
	SC Priboj	2,100	Priboj	1991
	SRC Šumadija	2,000	Aranđelovac	1980
	SC Mladost	2,000	Bečej	1988
	Raška Hall	2,000	Raška	2008
	Hram Hall	2,000	Kać	2000
	SC Banjica	1,800	Belgrade	1974
	SRC Jezero	1,800	Kladovo	1996
	SC Kolubara	1,700	Lazarevac	1978
	SRC Ljubomir Ivanović - Gedža	1,620	Mladenovac	
	Župa Hall	1,500	Aleksandrovac	
	Pendik Hall	1,500	Novi Pazar	2012
	Mostonga Hall	1,500	Sombor	1981
	Vrbas Sports Hall	1,500	Vrbas	1980
	Futog Sports Hall	1,500	Futog	2006
	SC Slana Bara	1,500	Novi Sad	2007
	Breza Hall	1,500	Gornji Milanovac	2008
	Obrenovac Hall	1,500	Obrenovac	1982
	Valjevo Sports Hall	1,500	Valjevo	1972
	Majdanpek Sports Hall	1,500	Majdanpek	
	Vlade Divac Sports Hall	1,300	Vrnjačka Banja	2008
	SC Šumice	1,300	Belgrade	1974
	Tikvara Hall	1,200	Bačka Palanka	
	Apatin Hall	1,125	Apatin	
	Strelište Sports Hall	1,100	Pančevo	1980
	STC Bajina Bašta	1,050	Bajina Bašta	
	SC Rakovica	1,000	Belgrade	
	Zoran Đinđić Hall	1,000	Prokuplje	2006
	Beočin Hall	1,000	Beočin	1991
	SC Mladost	1,000	Čačak	
	Dimitrovgrad Hall	1,000	Dimitrovgrad	2012
	SC Stara Pazova	1,000	Stara Pazova	
	Aleksinac Hall	900	Aleksinac	
	Petrovaradin Hall	900	Novi Sad	2017
	SC Jezero	860	Kikinda	1979
	Kej Hall	835	Pirot	2006
	Brus Hall	800	Brus	
	Sopot Hall	800	Sopot	
	SC Master	750	Belgrade	
	STC Zlatibor	712	Zlatibor	
	Radivoj Korać Hall	700	Belgrade	2012
	SC Park Hall	600	Kragujevac	
	Banjica Hall	520	Bela Palanka	2012
	SC Blace	500	Blace	2002
	Mega Factory Hall	500	Belgrade	2002
	SC Srbobran	500	Srbobran	2002
	KSC Čajetina	500	Čajetina	
	SC Torvel	400	Belgrade	
	Hall Crvenka	400	Crvenka	1981
	Žarkovo Hall	350	Belgrade	
	SC Vračar	200	Belgrade	
	Dynamic Hall		Belgrade	2015
	SC Kovilovo		Belgrade	
	SD Radnički Hall		Belgrade	
	Bojnik Hall		Bojnik	2016
	SC Inđija		Inđija	
	Kučevo Hall		Kučevo	
	SC Duga		Novi Sad	
	SC Petrovac Na Mlavi		Petrovac	
	SC Kolos		Čačak	
	Žitorađa Hall		Žitorađa	1998

== List of indoor swimming pool arenas ==
Photo	Arena	Capacity	Location	Year opened
	SC Banjica	2,000	Belgrade	1974
	SRC Tašmajdan	1,800	Belgrade	1968
	SC Čair	1,050	Niš	1978
	SPC Vojvodina	1,000	Novi Sad	
	SRC 11. April	900	Belgrade	1979
	SC Jezero	800	Kikinda	1979
	SC Kruševac	800	Kruševac	
	SRC Majdanpek	800	Majdanpek	
	SRC Bor	700	Bor	
	SRC Mladost	650	Bečej	
	SC Milan Gale Muškatirović	600	Belgrade	1973
	SRC Zorka	600	Šabac	
	CFK Vračar	500	Belgrade	
	SC Soko	500	Sombor	
	SC Park	390	Kragujevac	2011
	SC Zrenjanin	350	Zrenjanin	
	SKC Obrenovac	300	Obrenovac	
	SC Mladost	240	Pančevo	
	SC Slana Bara	200	Novi Sad	2009
	City Pool	200	Užice	2012
	SC Pirot		Pirot	2015
	SC Prozivka		Subotica	2012

== List of indoor ice rinks ==
Photo	Arena	Capacity	Location	Year opened
	SPC Vojvodina Ice Hall	1,623	Novi Sad	1981
	Pionir Ice Hall	1,500	Belgrade	1973
	Beostar Ice Hall	200	Belgrade	2006

== See also ==
- List of indoor arenas in Europe
- List of indoor arenas by capacity
- Lists of stadiums
