= SPD Radnički =

Sports society in Kragujevac, Serbia

- Sports: 7 clubs in 4 different sports
- Founded: 12 February 2019; 6 years ago
- Based in: Kragujevac, Serbia
- Colors: Red and White
- Website: spdradnickikragujevac.com

Sportsko privredno društvo Radnički (Serbian Cyrillic: Спортско привредно друштво Раднчки, lit. 'Radnički Sports Company'), commonly abbreviated as SPD Radnički (Serbian Cyrillic: СПД Раднички), is a company and multi-sport club based in Kragujevac, Serbia. There are currently four men's and three women's teams within the club.

== Clubs ==
The following is a list of sport clubs owned by SPD Radnički:

Sport	Team name	Founded
Basketball	KKK Radnički; ŽKK Radnički	2015; 1967
Handball	RK Radnički; ŽRK Radnički	1964; 1993
Volleyball	OK Radnički; ŽOK Radnički	1945; 1977
Water polo	KVK Radnički	2012
