= KK Pirot =

Basketball club in Pirot, Serbia

Pirot
- Leagues: Second League of Serbia
- Founded: 1952; 74 years ago
- History: KK Partizan (1952–1961); KK Pirot (1961–present)
- Arena: Pirot Kej Hall
- Capacity: 835 (1000)
- Location: Pirot, Serbia
- Team colors: Red and White
- President: Bojan Randjelović
- Head coach: Marko Spasić
- Website: kkpirot.com
Home	Away

Košarkaški klub Pirot (Serbian Cyrillic: Кошаркашки клуб Пирот), commonly referred to as KK Pirot, is a men's professional basketball club based in Pirot, Serbia. They are currently competing in the Second League of Serbia.

== History ==
In the 2019–20 season, Pirot placed third in the Second League of Serbia and got promoted to the Basketball League of Serbia for the 2020–21 season.

== Players ==
=== 2024/25 season roster ===
Note: Flags indicate national team eligibility at FIBA-sanctioned events. Players may hold other non-FIBA nationalities not displayed.

KK Pirot roster
Players
Coaches

Pos.	No.	Nat.	Name	Ht.	Age
PG	4	(Serbia)	Đonlić, Nikola	1.84 m (6 ft 0 in)	32 – 7 December 1993
G/F	17	(Serbia)	Radulović, Uglješa	2.00 m (6 ft 7 in)	26 – 23 March 2000
SG	7	(Serbia)	Filipović, Dušan (C)	1.88 m (6 ft 2 in)	34 – 2 August 1992
SG	8	(Serbia)	Pančić, Pavle	1.93 m (6 ft 4 in)	21 – 12 July 2005
G/F	9	(Serbia)	Djordjević, Dimitrije	1.93 m (6 ft 4 in)	26 – 8 February 2000
PF/C	14	(Serbia)	Matović, Martin	2.04 m (6 ft 8 in)	32 – 21 April 1994
PF	11	(Serbia)	Vukićević, Miloš	2.01 m (6 ft 7 in)	32 – 23 January 1994
F	12	(Serbia)	Vasić, Vuk	2.00 m (6 ft 7 in)	24 – 16 February 2002
F	55	(Serbia)	Kostić, Andrija	1.99 m (6 ft 6 in)	20 – 9 August 2006
F	27	(Serbia)	Đorđević, Vid	1.99 m (6 ft 6 in)	19 – 18 July 2007
C	13	(Serbia)	Đorđević, Borko	2.09 m (6 ft 10 in)	31 – 28 October 1994
PG	16	(Serbia)	Stefanović, Vladimir	1.82 m (6 ft 0 in)	27 – 15 June 1999
CG	5	(Serbia)	Đorđević, Aleksa	1.85 m (6 ft 1 in)	21 – 21 June 2005
PG	17	(Serbia)	Stojković, Strahinja	1.85 m (6 ft 1 in)	27–28 – Missing required parameter 1=month! 1998

Head coach

- (Serbia) Marko Spasić

Assistant coach(es)

- (Serbia) Ivica Lakićević

Legend

- (C) Team captain
- Injured

== Coaches ==
- (Serbia and Montenegro) Zoran Sotirović (2000–2001)
- (Serbia and Montenegro) Oliver Kostić (2001–2002)
- (Serbia and Montenegro) Zoran Sotirović (2002–2004)
- (Serbia) Zoran Sotirović (2008–2009)
- (Serbia) Marko Spasić (2011–2012)
- (Serbia) Zoran Petrović (2012–2014)
- (Serbia) Mihajlo Mitić (2014–2016)
- (Serbia) Marko Spasić (2016–2020)
- (Serbia) Filip Socek (2020–2021)
- (Serbia) Zoran Milovanović (2021–2023)
- (Serbia) Marko Spasić (2023–present)

== Season by season ==
Season	Tier	Division	Pos.	Postseason	W–L
2009–10	3	First regional League - East division	3rd	—	20–6
2010–11	3	First regional League - East division	4th	—	18–8
2011–12	3	First regional League - East division	3rd	—	22–4
2012–13	3	First regional League - East division	1st	—	24–2
2013–14	2	Second Basketball League of Serbia	7th	—	13-13
2014–15	2	Second Basketball League of Serbia	3rd	—	20–6
2015–16	2	Second Basketball League of Serbia	8th	—	13-13
2016–17	2	Second Basketball League of Serbia	4th	—	17–9
2017–18	2	Second Basketball League of Serbia	4th	—	15–11
2018–19	2	Second Basketball League of Serbia	6th	—	14–12
2019–20	2	Second Basketball League of Serbia	3rd	—	15–7
2020–21	1	BLS First League	16th	—	9-21
2021–22	2	Second Basketball League of Serbia	3rd	3rd	20–8
2022–23	2	Second Basketball League of Serbia	2nd	4th	17–11

== Trophies and awards ==
=== Trophies ===
- First Regional League – East Division (3rd-tier)
  - Winners (1): 2012–13

=== Individual awards ===
- Second Men's League of Serbia assists leader (4):
  - Sanel Mukanović — 2013–14, 2014–15, 2017–18, 2018–19

== Notable players ==
- (Socialist Federal Republic of Yugoslavia) Svetislav Pešić
- (Socialist Federal Republic of Yugoslavia) Zoran Lazarević
- (Serbia) Strahinja Dragićević
- (Serbia) Nemanja Nenadić
- (Australia) Venky Jois
