= Zoran Todorović =

Serbian basketball player and coach

Personal information
- Born: July 9, 1967 (age 59) Smederevo, SR Serbia, SFR Yugoslavia

Career information
- NBA draft: 1989: undrafted
- Playing career: 1985–1997
- Position: Point guard
- Coaching career: 1999–present

Career history

Coaching
- 1999–2001: Smederevo 1953
- 2001–2003: Swisslion Vršac
- 2003–2005: Smederevo 1953
- 2005–2006: FMP (youth)
- 2006–2007: Pelister
- 2007–2008: Proleter Naftagas
- 2008–2017: Smederevo 1953
- 2017: Kragujevački Radnički
- 2017, 2018–2019: Mladost SP
- 2019: Pelister
- 2020: Vršac

Zoran Todorović (Serbian Cyrillic: Зоран Тодоровић; born July 9, 1967) is a Serbian basketball coach and former player.

== Playing career ==
Todorović played for Smederevo 1953, Goša from Smederevska Palanka, and Radnički Kovin. He also played in the 1995–96 season for the Apollon Limassol of the Cyprus Division A.

== Coaching career ==
Todorović started his coaching career in 1999 with Smederevo 1953. In 2001, he had moved to Swisslion Vršac where he stayed until 2003. In 2003, once again he signed with Smederevo. After two seasons he became a youth coach for the FMP. In 2006–07 season he coached Pelister of the Macedonian First League. In next season, he coached Proleter Naftagas of the Second Basketball League of Serbia.

In September 2017, Todorović was named a head coach for Kragujevački Radnički of the Basketball League of Serbia. After four losses in first four games on the start of 2017–18 season, he resigned.

On 6 February 2020, Todorović was named a head coach for Vršac. On 2 November 2020, Vršac parted ways with him.

=== National youth teams ===
Todorović was an assistant coach for the Serbian men's university team in 2012 and 2013.

On 17 December 2015, Todorović was named as the head coach of the Serbia men's B national team. On 8 February 2017, he became the head coach of the Serbian men's university team. His team took 4th place at the 2017 Summer Universiade in Taipei, Taiwan.
