= Zablaće (Čačak) =

Zablaće Заблаће (Serbian)
- Village
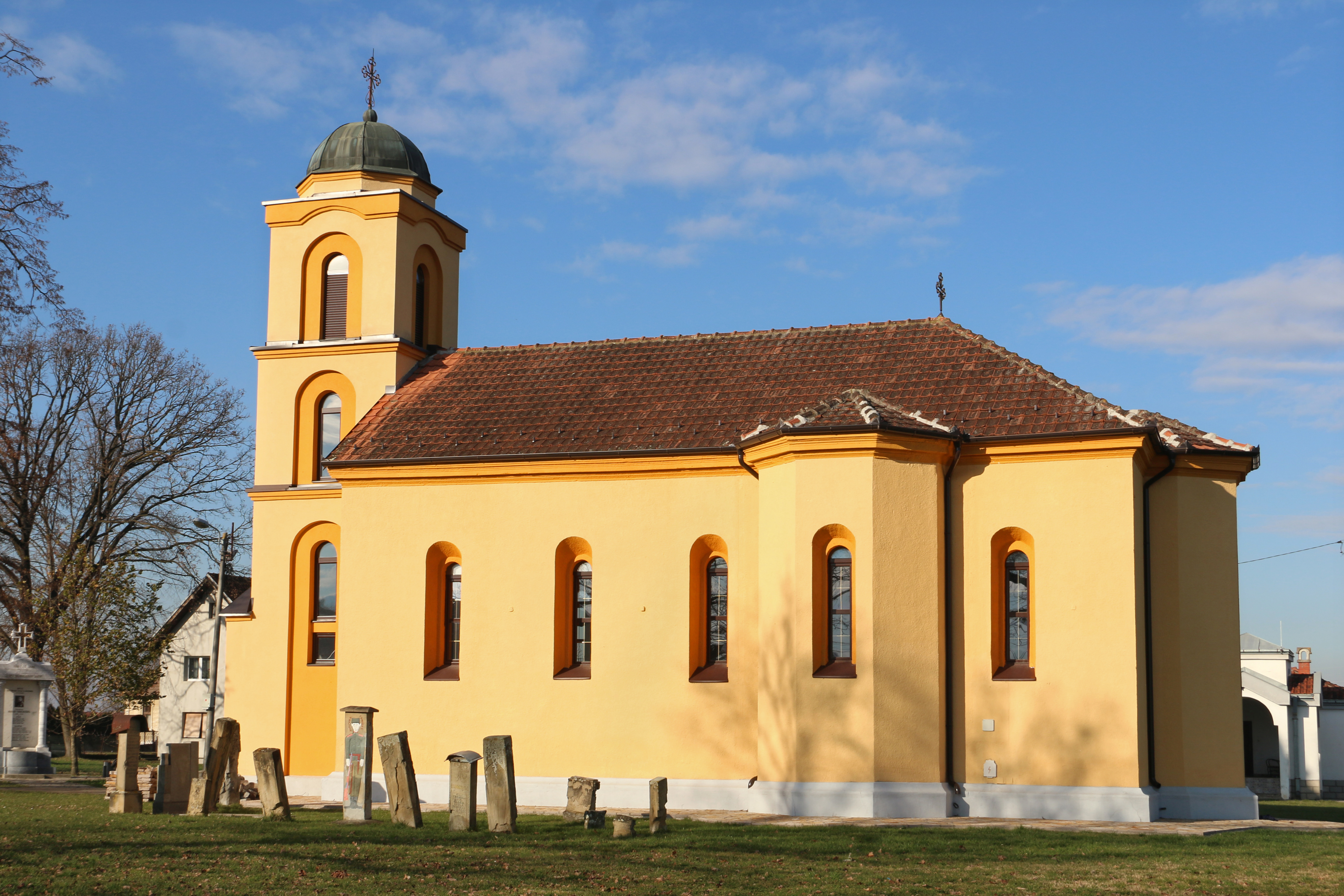
- Church of St. Archangel Gabriel in Zablaće

- Location within Serbia
- Coordinates: 43°50′48″N 20°27′00″E
- Country: Serbia
- District: Moravica District
- Municipality: Čačak

Area
  - Total: 8.46 km^{2} (3.27 sq mi)
- Elevation: 198 m (650 ft)

Population (2011)
  - Total: 1,170
  - Density: 138/km^{2} (358/sq mi)
- Time zone: UTC+1 (CET)
  - Summer (DST): UTC+2 (CEST)

Zablaće (Serbian Cyrillic: Заблаће) is a village in the municipality of Čačak, Serbia. According to the 2011 census, the village has a population of 1,170 people.
