= Vladimir Lučić (basketball, born 1982) =

Serbian basketball coach

Personal information
- Born: October 4, 1982 (age 44) Čačak, SR Serbia, SFR Yugoslavia
- Position: Head coach
- Coaching career: 2001–present

Career history

Coaching
- 2006–2007: Beovuk 72
- 2007–2008: FMP Železnik (youth, asst.)
- 2008–2009: Beovuk 72 (assistant)
- 2009–2010: Beovuk 72 (youth)
- 2010–2012: Žarkovo
- 2012–2013: Concordia Chiajna
- 2014–2016: Traiskirchen Lions
- 2017–2020: Sloboda Užice
- 2020–2021: Vršac
- 2021: Budapesti Honvéd
- 2021–2022: Rasta Vechta
- 2022: Čačak 94

Career highlights
- Serbian League Cup winner (2020); 2nd Serbian League champion (2018)

Vladimir Lučić (Serbian Cyrillic: Владимир Лучић; born October 4, 1982) is a Serbian professional basketball coach.

== Coaching career ==
Lučić begun his professional coaching career in 2001. He was a staff member for the Beovuk 72 youth team. Later, he coached Beovuk 72 and Žarkovo of Serbian 2nd-tier League. In 2012, Lučić was named a head coach for the Romanian team Concordia Chiajna. In November 2013, he left Concordia.

In January 2014, Lučić became a head coach for the Austrian team Arkadia Traiskirchen Lions of the Austrian Bundesliga. His contract was not renewed after the 2014-15 campaign due to financial reasons. However, Lučić returned to Arkadia in November 2015. He reached the semifinals of the Austrian championship with the club and parted company with the team after the 2015–16 season.

In January 2017, Lučić was named a head coach for the Serbian team Sloboda Užice of the Serbian 2nd-tier League. He won the Second Serbian League in the 2017–18 season and moved Sloboda Užice to the Basketball League of Serbia for the 2018–19 season. On 1 November 2020, Sloboda Užice parted ways with him. On the next day, he was hired as the new head coach for Vršac. In July 2021, he signed a two-year contract extension with Vršac. In August 2021, he parted ways with Vršac.

After agreeing on terms with Budapesti Honvéd in the summer of 2021 and coaching the team until October 2021, he signed with SC Rasta Vechta of the German second-tier league ProA on November 9, 2021.
