= Aleksa Zarić =

Serbian basketball player

Hercegovac
- Position: Shooting guard
- League: Second League of Serbia

Personal information
- Born: March 28, 1998 (age 28) Novi Sad, Serbia, FR Yugoslavia
- Listed height: 1.96 m (6 ft 5 in)
- Listed weight: 90 kg (198 lb)

Career information
- NBA draft: 2020: undrafted
- Playing career: 2015–present

Career history
- 2015–2022: Vojvodina
- 2019: → Mega Bemax
- 2022–present: Hercegovac

Career highlights
- Serbian League Cup winner (2021)

Aleksa Zarić (Serbian Cyrillic: Алекса Зарић; born March 28, 1998) is a Serbian professional basketball player for Hercegovac of the Second League of Serbia.

== Professional career ==
Zarić started professional basketball career in his hometown team Vojvodina. In April 2019, Zarić was loaned out to Mega Bemax for the rest of the 2018–19 Serbian League season.
