= Dušan Jelić =

Serbian-Greek professional basketball player (born 1974)

Personal information
- Born: 13 August 1974 (age 52) Banatska Palanka, SFR Yugoslavia
- Listed height: 6 ft 11 in (2.11 m)
- Listed weight: 275 lb (125 kg)

Career information
- NBA draft: 1997: undrafted
- Playing career: 1991–2011
- Position: Center
- Number: 9
- Coaching career: 2013–present

Career history

Playing
- 1991–1992: Crvena zvezda
- 1993–2000: Panionios
- 2000–2001: Crvena zvezda
- 2001: Lucentum Alicante
- 2001–2002: Olympiacos
- 2002–2003: Air Avellino
- 2003–2004: Tau Cerámica
- 2004: Prokom Trefl Sopot
- 2004–2005: Makedonikos
- 2005: Anwil Włocławek
- 2005–2006: Upea Capo d'Orlando
- 2006: Castelletto Ticino
- 2006: Huelva
- 2006–2007: Ventspils
- 2007–2008: APOEL
- 2008: BC Kalev
- 2008–2009: Swisslion Takovo
- 2009: Euroins Cherno More
- 2009–2010: Apollon Patras
- 2010–2011: FMP

Coaching
- 2013–2014: Crvena zvezda U16 (assistant)
- 2014–2016: Club Africain (assistant)
- 2016–2018: Petrochimi 2
- 2018–2019: Nizhny Novgorod (assistant)
- 2019–2021: Mladost Zemun (assistant)
- 2021: Napredak Aleksinac

Career highlights
- As a player: Greek Cup winner (2002)

Dušan Jelić (Serbian Cyrillic: Душан Јелић; born 13 August 1974) is a Serbian-Greek professional basketball coach and former player. At a height of 2.11 m (6 ft 11 in) tall, he played at the center position.

== Coaching career ==
In February 2021, Jelić was hired as the new head coach of Napredak Aleksinac of the Basketball League of Serbia.

== Personal life ==
Like many players from the former Yugoslavia during the 1990s, Jelić obtained Greek citizenship, while playing in the country, and thus competed as a domestic player under the name Ntousan Koutsopoulos (Greek: Ντοὐσαν Κουτσόπουλος). In Greece, he is also known by the name Dušan Jelic Koutsopoulos.
