= Vladimir Veličković (basketball) =

Serbian basketball player

Vladimir Velicković
Personal information
- Born: 3 March 1989 (age 37) Niš, SR Serbia, SFR Yugoslavia
- Listed height: 1.78 m (5 ft 10 in)

Career information
- NBA draft: 2011: undrafted
- Playing career: 2009–present
- Position: Point guard

Career history
- 2009–2010: Vojvodina Srbijagas
- 2011: MZT Skopje
- 2011–2012: Vojvodina Srbijagas
- 2012–2013: Konstantin
- 2013–2014: Baník Handlová
- 2014–2016: Konstantin
- 2016–2017: Tamiš
- 2017–2018: Zlatibor
- 2018–2019: Konstantin
- 2019: Dynamic
- 2019–2020: Zdravlje
- 2020–2021: Konstantin

Career highlights
- Serbian League Cup winner (2018)

Vladimir Veličković (Serbian Cyrillic: Владимир Величковић; born 3 March 1989) is a Serbian professional basketball player.

== Playing career ==
A point guard, Veličković played for Vojvodina Srbijagas, MZT Skopje (Macedonia), Konstantin, Baník Handlová (Slovakia), Tamiš, Zlatibor, Dynamic, and Zdravlje.
