= Darko Kostić (basketball) =

Serbian-Greek basketball player and coach

Personal information
- Born: 30 September 1978 (age 48) Smederevo, SR Serbia, SFR Yugoslavia
- Listed height: 1.85 m (6 ft 1 in)

Career information
- NBA draft: 2000: undrafted
- Playing career: 1997–2015
- Position: Point guard
- Number: 5, 10, 6
- Coaching career: 2015–present

Career history

Playing
- 1997–1998: Filippos
- 1998–1999: Okapi Aalstar
- 1999–2000: Ratiopharm Ulm
- 2000–2001: Okapi Aalstar
- 2001–2002: Smederevo 1953
- 2002–2003: Radnički Belgrade
- 2003–2004: Chemosvit
- 2004–2005: BKM Lučenec
- Salesianos
- 2006–2009: Ermis Lagkada
- 2009–2012: Doxa Lefkadas
- 2012–2015: Livadeia

Coaching
- 2015–2016: OKK Beograd (assistant)
- 2016–2018: OKK Beograd
- 2018: Academic Bultex 99
- 2019–2020: Vršac
- 2020–2022: Novi Pazar
- 2022: Kolubara LA 2003
- 2025: KK Mladost Smederevska Palanka
- 2026 - present: KK Borac Zemun

Darko Kostić (Serbian Cyrillic: Дарко Костић, Greek: Ντάρκο Ράλλη (Ntarko Rallis); born 30 September 1978) is a Serbian–Greek professional basketball coach and former player.

== Playing career ==
Rallis had two stints with the Belgian team Okapi Aalstar where played during 1998–99 and 2000–01 season. In between he played for the German team Ratiopharm Ulm. In 2003, he moved to Slovakia where he played for two seasons for Chemosvit Svit and MBK Lučenec. Also, he played for the Ecuadorian team Salesianos Club Guayaquil.

On 2 November 2011 Rallis signed for Doxa Lefkadas of the Greek A2 League. He also played for the Greek A2 League teams Ermis Lagkada, and Livadeia.

== Coaching career ==
Prior to the 2016–17 season Kostić was named as a head coach of OKK Beograd after one year he spent there as an assistant coach of the head coach Vlade Đurović. He left the club in June 2018.

On 30 July 2018 Kostić became a head coach for Bulgarian team Academic Bultex 99. On 27 December 2018 Academic parted ways with him following the loss against Beroe.

On 4 January 2019, Kostić was named as a head coach of Vršac of the Basketball League of Serbia. In February 2020, he left Vršac.

On 16 June 2020, Kostić became a head coach for Novi Pazar.

On 13 Jaunuary 2026, Kostić became a head coach for KK Borac Zemun
