= Branko Milisavljević =

Serbian basketball player and coach

Branko Milisavljević Бранко Милисављевић
Podgorica
- Title: Assistant coach
- League: Prva A Liga; ABA League Second Division

Personal information
- Born: 21 July 1976 (age 50) Titovo Užice, SR Serbia, SFR Yugoslavia
- Listed height: 1.93 m (6 ft 4 in)
- Listed weight: 84 kg (185 lb)

Career information
- NBA draft: 1998: undrafted
- Playing career: 1996–2014
- Position: Point guard
- Number: 4, 10, 13, 17, 18
- Coaching career: 2015–present

Career history

Playing
- 1996–2000: Borac Čačak
- 2000: Shakhter Irkutsk
- 2000–2001: Partizan
- 2001–2002: Limoges CSP
- 2002–2003: PAOK
- 2003: Olympiacos
- 2003–2004: Dynamo Moscow
- 2004–2005: Telekom Baskets Bonn
- 2005: Ironi Nahariya
- 2006: Mega Ishrana
- 2006–2007: SLUC Nancy Basket
- 2007: Paris-Levallois
- 2007–2008: Maroussi
- 2008–2009: Lietuvos rytas
- 2009: Cajasol Sevilla
- 2009–2010: PAOK
- 2010–2012: Mega Vizura
- 2012: Radnički Belgrade
- 2012–2013: Lugano Tigers
- 2013–2014: Les Lions de Genève

Coaching
- 2015–2017: Radnički Belgrade
- 2017–2018: BBC Monthey
- 2019: Mega Basket (youth)
- 2019–2020: OKK Beograd
- 2021–2025: Podgorica (assistant)
- 2025–present: Partizan (youth)

Career highlights
- YUBA League Top Scorer (2000)

Branko Milisavljević (Serbian: Бранко Милисављевић; born 21 July 1976) is a Serbian professional basketball coach and former player who works as coach in youth system of Partizan.

Standing at 1.93 m (6 ft 4 in), he played at the point guard position.

== Playing career ==
During his playing career, Milisavljević played abroad in several countries, most notably in France and Greece where he played for three clubs. He also played in Russia, Germany, Israel, Lithuania, Spain and Switzerland. In his homeland, Milisavljević played for Borac Čačak, Partizan, Mega Vizura and BKK Radnički.

== Coaching career ==
Milisavljević coached Radnički Belgrade and BBC Monthey. In January 2019, he was named as the head youth coach of Mega Bemax succeeding Vlada Vukoičić.

On June 7 2019, Milisavljević became the head coach for OKK Beograd of the Basketball League of Serbia. He left the club after the 2019–20 season.

In June 2021, Montenegrin team Podgorica named him their new assistant coach.
