= Second Regional Basketball League =

Second Men's Regional League
- Founded: 2006; 20 years ago
- First season: 2006–07
- Country: Serbia
- Confederation: FIBA Europe
- Divisions: 6
- Number of teams: 56
- Level on pyramid: 4th
- Promotion to: First Men's Regional League
- Relegation to: Local Summer Leagues
- Website: kss.rs

Second Men's Regional League (Serbian Cyrillic: Друга мушка регионална лига, romanized: Druga muška regionalna liga) is the men's regional basketball league in Serbia. It is the 4th-tier of the basketball league system in Serbia. Founded in 2006, it is run by the Basketball Federation of Serbia (KSS).

== Rules ==
=== Competition format ===
The league, operated by the Basketball Federation of Serbia and Regional Basketball Associations, consists of six divisions, North (N), North (S), Central, East, West (Group One) and West (Group Two), which have 14 teams each. The first team in every division will be promoted to First Men's Regional League in line with the regional format.

== History ==
The following are the division champions of the Second Regional League:

| Season | North (N) | North (S) | Central | East | West – Group One | West – Group Two | Ref. |
|---|---|---|---|---|---|---|---|
| 2006–07 | Not available | Not available | Not available | Not available | Not available | Not available | |
| 2007–08 | Not available | Not available | Not available | Not available | Not available | Not available | |
| 2008–09 | Not available | Not available | Pro Sport (Belgrade) | Not available | Not available | Not available | |
| 2009–10 | Not available | Not available | Milan Trivić (Belgrade) | Not available | Not available | Not available | |
| 2010–11 | Not available | Not available | Surčin (Belgrade) | Zdravlje 09 (Leskovac) | Not available | Not available | |
| 2011–12 | Not available | Not available | Borča (Borča) | Not available | Not available | Not available | |
| 2012–13 | Not available | Not available | Sparta Radijus Vektor (Belgrade) | Naisus (Niš) | Mileševac (Prijepolje) | Sloga Despotovac (Despotovac) | |
| 2013–14 | Futog Tehnomer (Futog) | BNS (Banatsko Novo Selo) | Surčin Dobanovci (Belgrade) | Jastrebac (Aleksinac) | Student Bajina Bašta (Bajina Bašta) | Mladost SP (Smederevska Palanka) | |
| 2014–15 | Crvenka Dunav (Crvenka) | Radnički Kovin (Kovin) | Grocka (Belgrade) | Radan (Lebane) | Klik (Arilje) | Zekas 75 (Rača) | |
| 2015–16 | Dunav 2014 (Apatin) | Nova Pazova (Nova Pazova) | Ras (Belgrade) | Mladost Zaječar (Zaječar) | Mileševac (Prijepolje) | Kragujevački Radnički (Kragujevac) | |
| 2016–17 | Mladost Veternik (Veternik) | Omladinac (Novi Banovci) | Vitez BGD 011 (Belgrade) | Bor RTB (Bor) | Radnički Valjevo (Valjevo) | Paraćin (Paraćin) | |
| 2017–18 | Star (Novi Sad) | Železničar Inđija (Inđija) | BTC (Belgrade) | Fair Play (Niš) | Čačak 94 (Čačak) | Požarevac (Požarevac) | |
| 2018–19 | Sloboda NS (Novi Sad) | Stara Pazova (Stara Pazova) | LA Basket (Lazarevac) | Probasket (Prokuplje) | Loznica (Loznica) | Svilajnac (Svilajnac) | |
| 2019–20 | All canceled due to the COVID-19 pandemic in Serbia | | | | | | |
| 2020–21 | Srbobran (Srbobran) | Sloven (Ruma) | ŠKK Zvezdara (Belgrade) | Ratnici (Niš) | Mileševac (Prijepolje) | Paraćin (Paraćin) | |
| 2021–22 | I Came to Play (Novi Sad) | Radnički Kovin (Kovin) | Beba Basket (Belgrade) | Radan (Lebane) | Morava (Zablaće, Čačak) | Ćuprija (Ćuprija) | |

== Current clubs ==
The following is the list of clubs for the 2021–22 season.

=== North (N) ===
The North (North) division is composed of 17 clubs.

| Club | City |
|---|---|
| Akademik | Srbobran |
| Apatin | Apatin |
| Bagljaš | Zrenjanin |
| Basketball Stars | Futog |
| Beočin | Beočin |
| Budućnost Novi Sad | Novi Sad |
| Crvenka | Crvenka |
| Futog 1267 | Futog |
| I Came to Play | Novi Sad |
| Karađorđevo | Banatsko Karađorđevo |
| Marina | Bačka Palanka |
| OKK Spartak | Subotica |
| Petrovgrad | Zrenjanin |
| Proleter Ravno Selo | Ravno Selo |
| Sivac | Sivac |
| Sport's World | Novi Sad |
| Veternik 1998 | Veternik |

=== North (S) ===
The North (South) division is composed of 11 clubs.

| Club | City |
|---|---|
| Agrobanat | Plandište |
| BNS | Banatsko Novo Selo |
| Dinamo | Pančevo |
| Jadran | Golubinci |
| Jedinstvo Kačarevo | Kačarevo |
| Opovo 99 | Opovo |
| Partizan Šid | Šid |
| Radnički Kovin | Kovin |
| RU-Koš | Ruma |
| Šimanovci | Šimanovci |
| Vojka | Vojka |

=== Canter ===
The Canter division is composed of 13 clubs.

| Club | City |
|---|---|
| ABBA Barič | Barič |
| AS Basket | Belgrade |
| Barajevo Bambi | Belgrade |
| Borča | Belgrade |
| Cerak | Belgrade |
| Eko-Sport | Belgrade |
| Gorica Sremčica | Belgrade |
| Gro-Basket | Grocka |
| Mondo Basket | Zemun |
| Ras | Belgrade |
| Surčin Dobanovci | Dobanovci |
| Umka Jazz | Umka |
| Veba Basket | Belgrade |

=== East ===
The East division is composed of 10 clubs.

| Club | City |
|---|---|
| Bin | Zaječar |
| Hajduk Veljko | Negotin |
| Hisar | Leskovac |
| Jasktrebac | Aleksinac |
| Kuršumlija | Kuršumlija |
| Pusta Reka | Bojnik |
| Radan | Lebane |
| Sokobanja | Sokobanja |
| Svrljig | Svrljig |
| Trijumf | Niš |

=== West – Group One ===
The West Group One division is composed of 16 clubs.

| Club | City |
|---|---|
| Apač | Loznica |
| Babaić | Ljig |
| Miks | Majur |
| Mladost Čačak | Čačak |
| Mladost 2014 | Ub |
| Morava | Zablaće |
| MVP 3x3 | Krupanj |
| Osečina | Osečina |
| Play Off | Užice |
| Radnički VA | Valjevo |
| Sevojno | Sevojno |
| Sloga Požega | Požega |
| Student 014 | Valjevo |
| Šabac | Šabac |
| Užice | Užice |
| Železničar Lajkovac | Lajkovac |

=== West – Group Two ===
The West Group Two division is composed of 15 clubs.

| Club | City |
|---|---|
| Ćuprija | Ćuprija |
| Goč | Vrnjačka Banja |
| Koš 020 | Novi Pazar |
| OKK Kruševac | Kruševac |
| Polet | Kraljevo |
| Prva Petoletka | Trstenik |
| Sloga Batočina | Batočina |
| Sloga Despotovac | Despotovac |
| Sloga PNM | Petrovac na Mlavi |
| Smederevo 1953 | Smederevo |
| Stari Ras | Novi Pazar |
| Šumadija 2017 | Aranđelovac |
| Trepča | Kosovska Mitrovica |
| Zicer | Novi Pazar |
| Zicer 2014 | Gruža |
