= KK SPD Radnički =

Basketball club in Kragujevac, Serbia

Radnički Kragujevac
- Leagues: Basketball League of Serbia
- Founded: 2015; 11 years ago
- History: KKK Radnički (2015–2019); SPD Radnički (2019–present)
- Arena: Jezero Hall
- Capacity: 3,750
- Location: Kragujevac, Serbia
- Team colors: Red and White
- President: Srećko Otović
- Head coach: Igor Todorović
- Ownership: SPD Radnički
- Website: kkkradnicki.rs
| Home | Away |

Košarkaški klub Radnički (Serbian Cyrillic: Кошаркашки клуб Раднички), commonly referred to as Radnički Kragujevac or SPD Radnički, is a men's professional basketball club based in Kragujevac, Serbia, and a part of a multi-sports company SPD Radnički. They are currently competing in the Basketball League of Serbia.

== History ==
Logo from 2015 to 2019

The club was founded in October 2015 as KKK Radnički (full name: Kragujevački košarkaški klub Radnički), and a former basketball player and Kragujevac-born Nikola Lončar became the club president.

Napredak Rubin, which competed in the Basketball League of Serbia in the 2016–17 season, changed the tier with the Radnički for 2017–18 season. By approval from the Basketball Federation of Serbia, Napredak moved to the 3rd-tier First Regional League (West).

Since 2019, the club has been a part of multi-sports club SPD Radnički, based in Kragujevac.

== Players ==
- Mihailo Jovičić
- Đorđe Milosavljević

== Season by season ==
| Season | Tier | Division | Pos. | Postseason | W–L | National Cup |
|---|---|---|---|---|---|---|
| 2015–16 | 4 | Second Regional (West Group 2) | 1 | —N/a | 22–0 | — |
| 2016–17 | 3 | First Regional (West) | 4 | — | 20–6 | — |
| 2017–18 | 1 | BLS First League | 13 | DNQ | 7–19 | — |
| 2018–19 | 2 | BLS Second League | 9 | — | 13–13 | — |
| 2019–20 | 2 | BLS Second League | 1 | — | 20–2 | — |
| 2020–21 | 1 | BLS First League | 11 | DNQ | 12–18 | Quarterfinalist |
| 2021–22 | 1 | BLS First League | 15 | DNQ | 11–19 | Quarterfinalist |

Source: Srbijasport

== Coaching history ==
- (Serbia) Nenad Milojević (2015–2016)
- (Serbia) Zoran Milovanović (August 2016 – April 2017)
- (Serbia) Darko Brajković (2017)
- (Serbia) Zoran Todorović (2017)
- (Serbia) Bojan Kusmuk (2017–2018)
- (Serbia) Igor Todorović (2018–2021)
- (Serbia) Ivica Vukotić (2021–2022)
- (Serbia) Filip Socek (2022)
- (Serbia) Stevan Mijović (2022–2023)
- (Serbia) Marko Simonović (2023–2024)
- (Serbia) Igor Todorović (2024–present)
