= Filip Socek =

Serbian basketball player and coach

Personal information
- Born: December 31, 1982 (age 43) Novi Sad, SR Serbia, SFR Yugoslavia
- Listed height: 1.92 m (6 ft 4 in)

Career information
- NBA draft: 2004: undrafted
- Playing career: 2001–2009
- Position: Guard
- Coaching career: 2009–present

Career history

Coaching
- 2009–2011: Mladost Bački Jarak (assistant)
- 2011–2012: Meridiana (assistant)
- 2012–2014: Meridiana
- 2014–2015: Spartak
- 2015–2019, 2019–2020: Vojvodina
- 2020–2021: Pirot
- 2021–2022: Spartak
- 2022: Radnički Kragujevac
- 2022 - 2024: BC Kazma, Kuwait
- 2024 - present: KK Proleter, Zrenjanin

Career highlights
- Serbian B League champion (2013)
Medals
Men's basketball
Assistant coach for Serbia
FIBA Europe Under-16 Championship
Silver medal – second place	2013 Ukraine	U16 Team

Filip Socek (Serbian Cyrillic: Филип Соцек; born December 31, 1982) is a Serbian basketball coach and former player.

== Playing career ==
Socek was professional basketball player who played for his hometown team Vojvodina and for Montenegrin teams Mogren and Ulcinj. He finished his playing career with Mladost Bački Jarak in 2009.

== Coaching career ==
Socek was a coach head coach of Mladost Bački Jarak and Meridiana. He won the Serbian B League in 2012–13 season with Meridiana.

He was an assistant coach for Serbia men's national under-16 basketball team which won a silver medal at the 2013 FIBA Europe Under-16 Championship.

Prior to the 2014–15 season, Socek became a head coach for the Spartak Subotica. In January 2015, Socek was named as a head coach for the Vojvodina. He left Vojvodina after the 2018–19 season. In November 2019, he signed for Vojvodina. He left the club after in June 2020.

On 16 November 2020, Socek was hired as the new head coach of Pirot. Prior to the 2021–22 2MLS season, Spartak Subotica hired him as their new head coach. Spartak fired him in November 2021. On 21 February 2022, Radnički Kragujevac hired Socek as their new head coach.

== Career achievements and awards ==
- Serbian B League champion: 1 (with Meridiana: 2012–13)
- AP Vojvodina Coach of the Year: 2017
