= OKK Vrbas =

Basketball club in Vrbas, Serbia

Vrbas
- Leagues: Second League of Serbia
- Founded: 1997; 28 years ago
- History: OKK Vrbas (1997–present)
- Arena: Centar za fizičku kulturu Vrbas
- Capacity: 18.000
- Location: Vrbas, Serbia
- Team colors: Blue and white

Omladinski košarkaški klub Vrbas (Serbian Cyrillic: Омладински кошаркашки клуб Врбас; transl. Vrbas Youth Basketball Club), commonly referred to as OKK Vrbas or KK Vrbas, is a men's basketball club based in Vrbas, Serbia. They are currently competing in the Second Basketball League of Serbia.

== History ==
The club finished at the top spot in the 2019–20 season with a 17–1 record prior the cancellation of the season. After the abandoned season, the club got promoted to the Second Basketball League of Serbia for the 2020–21 season.

== Head coaches ==
- (Serbia) Veselin Čolaković (2017–2018)
- (Serbia) Vuk Peković (2017–2018)
- (Serbia) Bojan Marković (2019–2020)
- (Serbia) Petar Bodrožić (2020–2021)
- (Serbia) Bojan Marković (2021–present)

== Trophies and awards ==
=== Trophies ===
- First Regional League, North Division (3rd-tier)
  - Winners (1): 2017–18

=== Individual awards ===
- Second Men's League of Serbia scoring leader (1):
  - Ivan Đurović — 2018–19
