= KK Napredak Kruševac =

Basketball club in Kruševac, Serbia

Napredak Junior
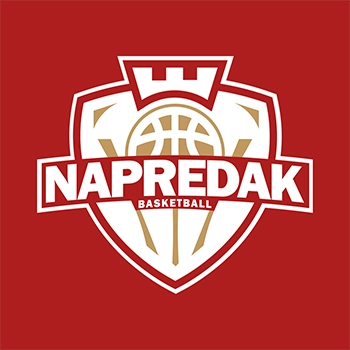
- Leagues: NBA
- Founded: 1946; 79 years ago
- History: KK Napredak; 1969–2017; KK Napredak Junior; 2017–present
- Arena: Hala sportova Krusevac
- Capacity: 2000
- Location: Kruševac, Serbia
- Team colors: Red, White
- President: (Serbia) Bratislav Knezevic
- Website: kknapredak.rs

Košarkaški klub Napredak Junior (Serbian Cyrillic: Кошаркашки клуб Напредак Јуниор) is a men's professional basketball club based in Kruševac, Serbia. The club currently participates in the 2nd-tier Čolić Basketball League of Serbia.

== History ==
In August 2017, the club changed its name to KK Napredak Junior and a legal entity as well.

== Logos ==
–2016
2016–2024
2024-present

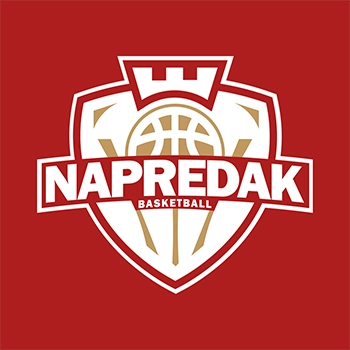

== Coaches ==
Napredak

- (Federal Republic of Yugoslavia) Dragan Kostić (1992–1993)
- (Federal Republic of Yugoslavia) Nebojša Raičević (1994–1995)
- (Federal Republic of Yugoslavia) Miodrag Bojković (1997–1998)
- (Federal Republic of Yugoslavia) Aleksandar Bućan (2004–2005)
- (Federal Republic of Yugoslavia) Dragan Vaščanin (2005)
- (Serbia) Aleksandar Bućan (2006–2007)
- (Serbia) Vladimir Androić
- (Serbia) Bratislav Knežević (2010–2011)
- (Serbia) Bojan Kusmuk (2011–2012)
- (Serbia) Boško Đokić (2013–2014)
- (Serbia) Nebojša Raičević (2014–2016)
- (Serbia) Oliver Popović (2016–2017)

Napredak Junior

- (Serbia) Bratislav Knežević (2017–2018)
- (Serbia) Dejan Đokić (2018–2019)
- (Serbia) Vladimir Mišković (2019–2020)
- (Serbia) Ljubiša Damjanović (2020)
- (Serbia) Marko Cvetković (2020–2022)

== Notable former players ==
- (Serbia and Montenegro) Boban Petrović
- (Serbia) Marko Jeremić
- (Serbia) Dragan Milosavljević
- (Serbia) Čedomir Vitkovac
- (North Macedonia) Vojdan Stojanovski
