= Marko Cvetković =

Serbian basketball player and coach

Igokea m:tel
- Title: Assistant coach
- League: Bosnian League; ABA League

Personal information
- Born: 14 April 1977 (age 49) Niš, SR Serbia, Yugoslavia
- Listed height: 1.97 m (6 ft 6 in)

Career information
- NBA draft: 1999: undrafted
- Playing career: 1995–2012
- Position: Shooting guard / small forward
- Number: 13, 31
- Coaching career: 2012–present

Career history

Playing
- 1995–1997: Viner Broker Niš
- 1997–1999: Sloga
- 1999–2002: Zdravlje
- 2002–2004: NIS Vojvodina
- 2004: Spartak
- 2004–2005: OKK Beograd
- 2005–2006: Nyíregyháza
- 2006–2007: Zdravlje
- 2007–2008: Crvena zvezda
- 2009: Ergonom
- 2009–2010: Sinđelić
- 2010: Lukoil Academic
- 2011–2012: Konstantin

Coaching
- 2012–2013: Konstantin (assistant)
- 2013–2016: Konstantin
- 2016–2017: Handlová
- 2017, 2018–2020: Konstantin
- 2020–2022: Napredak Junior
- 2022–present: Igokea (assistant)

Career highlights
- As player: NBL-Bulgaria champion (2010)
Medals
Men's basketball
Assistant Coach for Serbia
U20 European Championship Division B
Gold medal – first place	2022 Georgia	Team

Marko Cvetković (Serbian Cyrillic: Марко Цветковић; born 14 April 1977) is a Serbian professional basketball coach and former player. He is currently an assistant coach for Igokea m:tel of the Bosnian League and the ABA League.

== Professional career ==
A shooting guard and small forward, Cvetković played for Sloga, Zdravlje, NIS Vojvodina, Spartak, OKK Beograd, Crvena zvezda, Ergonom, Konstantin, and Lukoil Academic. He retired as a player with Konstantin in 2012.

== Coaching career ==
After retirement in 2012, Cvetković was hired as an assistant coach for club where he ended his playing career, Konstantin under head coach Boško Đokić. In March 2013, he got promoted as the head coach. Cvetković left the club after the end of the 2015–16 KLS season.

In November 2016, Cvetković was hired as the head coach for Handlová for the 2016–17 Slovak League.

In September 2017, Cvetković returned to Konstantin as the head coach. He resigned in December 2017. In August 2018, Cvetković was named the head coach of Konstantin for the third time. He resigned in November 2020.

In December 2020, Napredak Junior hired Cvetković as their new head coach. In June 2022, Cvetković became an assistant coach for Igokea m:tel.

In July 2022, Cvetković was an assistant coach for the Serbian under-20 national team that won a gold medal at the 2022 FIBA U20 European Championship Division B in Tbilisi, Georgia.
