= KK Klik =

Basketball club in Arilje, Serbia

Klik
- Leagues: Second League of Serbia
- Founded: 17 March 1977; 49 years ago
- History: KK Klik; 1977–present
- Arena: Arilje Sports Hall
- Capacity: 520
- Location: Arilje, Serbia
- Team colors: Sky Blue and White
- President: Ivan Đajić
- Website: kk-klik.rs

Košarkaški klub Klik (Serbian Cyrillic: Кошаркашки клуб Клик, transl. Klik Basketball Club), commonly referred to as KK Klik or Klik Arilje, is a men's basketball club based in Arilje, Serbia. They currently compete in the Second Basketball League of Serbia.

== History ==
=== 1977–1993: Foundation and early years ===
The club was founded on 17 March 1977, and named after the Klik Hill near the Grdovići village. The club co-founders were Mišo and Milan Ostojić, two brothers who got introduce to basketball by Miodrag Marjanović, who had recently moved from Čačak to Arilje for work. At that time, Marjanović had just finished his basketball career in Železničar Čačak. The first president of the club was Andrija Topalović, the director of the Kolor clothing factory based in Arilje. The symbol of the club is eagle and the basic color of the club is sky blue. Soon after the club foundation, they played its first game in the summer league against KK Mačva from Bogatić. At that time the coach was Zoran Stojković, who got replaced by Ljupče Ćirković. The next coach was one of the co-founders, Miodrag Marjanović. He worked as a coach at the club for 12 years, leading a senior and junior team.

In 1980, a sports hall was opened within the Stevan Čolović elementary school. At the opening, the club played against Borac Čačak led by Željko Obradović. In 1984, the club qualified for the Second Serbian League. In 1986–87 season, the club won over Crnokosa, Zlatibor, Železničar Čačak, and Borac Čačak got to eight-finals of the Yugoslav Cup where they were defeated by IMT Belgrade which later won the cup. It was the greatest achievement in the club's history at the time. The club's best player in the cup tournament was Milun Vukotić.

=== 1993–1996: First successes ===
In the 1993–94 season, the club's management added several experienced players to the roster. The goal was to be placed in a higher rank of the competition, which was already successful in the first season. The team was led from the bench by the coaching tandem of Milan Kuvekalović and Dragan Milovojević, and later they were joined as the first coach by Petar Rodić. That season, 22 consecutive victories were achieved and the record of Cibona was tied. Already next season, placement in the YUBA B League was secured.

In the YUBA B League, the team was coached by Vladeta Milovanović. Promotion to the YUBA League was secured, which was divided into 1A and 1B leagues next season, so Klik was supposed to play in the 1B league as well. At the tournament in Arilje, the club, in the competition of Hemofarm and Zastava Kragujevac, became the amateur champion of Serbia and received a trophy from the basketball association. Due to the lack of an requisite sports hall, the club was merged with Zastava Kragujevac for a two-year period, but as the hall failed to be built in that period, the club had to start from the bottom tier.

=== 2000–2014 ===
Prior to 2000, the club competed only with its youth system. In the 2000–01 season, through the summer league, the Second Regional League was placed with coaches Dr. Dragan Milivojević from the round 12, and until then the team was led by Milan Kuvekalović. In the 2003–04 season, got promoted to the First Regional League was achieved, led by coaches Milun Vukotić and Milan Kuvekalović. That team was composed only of players born in Arilje.

=== Recent years ===
Prior to 2014, the club was relegated to the Second Serbian Regional League several times and returned to the First Serbian Regional League - West.

In the 2014–15 season, the club had to start from the beginning. Several experienced players were added to the junior team, and with 24 victories and only 2 defeats, they were placed in a higher rank. Djordje Lazovic led the team from the bench as the first coach, and Nebojsa Kaljevic, both prominent players of the club, led the team as an assistant coach.

In the next season, in the higher rank of the competition (First Serbian Regional League - West), the 5th place was won, and in the 2016/2017 season, the team was further strengthened. After the 9th round, the team had 3 defeats in the championship and was far from fighting for 1st place. placement in the Second League of Serbia, followed by a series of 17 consecutive victories and placement in the Second League of Serbia after 20. In the first part of the season, it was led by Đorđe Lazović and the second part of the season from the bench as first coach Marko Ičelić with the help of Dr. Dragan Milivojevic.

Second league of Serbia was welcomed with great enthusiasm. After the 2010-11 season, Miljan Marjanović returned to the club as a coach. In the competition of many big teams, the club took the 5th place in the division with 3 more clubs, which was a huge success. The league of Serbia was welcomed with great enthusiasm.

In the summer of 2018, Serbian basketball federation administratively returned the club to a lower rank in the First Serbian Regional League, which did not reduce the enthusiasm of everyone in the club. The work with the younger categories was additionally intensified and a competitive senior team was formed, which took the 2nd place in the league of 16 teams.

== Players ==
- Dragoslav Papić

== Head coaches ==
- (Serbia) Dragan Brkić (2007–2009)
- (Serbia) Miljan Marjanović (2010–2011)
- (Serbia) Milan Kuvekalović (2011–2012)
- (Serbia) Dragan Brkić (2012–2014)
- (Serbia) Đorđe Lazović (2014–2016)
- (Serbia) Dragan Milivojević (2017)
- (Serbia) Marko Ičelić (2017)
- (Serbia) Miljan Marjanović (2017–2018)
- (Serbia) Dušan Radović (2018)
- (Serbia) Vladimir Mišković (2019)
- (Serbia) Miljan Marjanović (2019–2021)
- (Serbia) Branko Jorović (2021–2022)
- (Serbia) Dragan Mitrović (2022–present)

== Trophies and awards ==
=== Trophies ===
- First Regional League, West Division (3rd-tier)
  - Winners (1): 2019–20
- First Regional League, West Division (3rd-tier)
  - Winners (1): 2016–17
- Second Regional League, West One Division (4th-tier)
  - Winners (1): 2014–15
- Second Regional League, West Division
  - Winners (1): 2003–04
