= KK Kolubara LA 2003 =

Basketball club in Lazarevac, Serbia

Kolubara LA 2003
- Leagues: Basketball League of Serbia
- Founded: 1970; 55 years ago
- History: KK Kolubara (1970–2003); KK Kolubara LA 2003 (2003–present)
- Arena: SRC Kolubara
- Capacity: 1,700
- Location: Lazarevac, Serbia
- Team colors: Green and White
- Website: kkkolubara.rs

Košarkaški klub Kolubara Lazarevac 2003 (Serbian Cyrillic: Кошаркашки клуб Колубара Лазаревац 2003), commonly referred to as KK Kolubara LA 2003, is a men's professional basketball club based in Lazarevac, Serbia. The club was named after Kolubara River. They are currently competing in the Basketball League of Serbia.

== Players ==
=== Current roster ===
Note: Flags indicate national team eligibility at FIBA-sanctioned events. Players may hold other non-FIBA nationalities not displayed.

KK Kolubara LA 2003 roster
Players
Coaches

Pos.	No.	Nat.	Name	Ht.	Age
G	1	(Serbia)	Živković, Vojislav	1.88 m (6 ft 2 in)	22 – 19 August 2003
PF	4	(Serbia)	Stojadinović, Marko	2.03 m (6 ft 8 in)	36 – 27 February 1989
PG	5	(Serbia)	Blagojević, Bogdan	1.88 m (6 ft 2 in)	21 – 17 December 2003
G	7	(Serbia)	Todorić, Mateja	1.90 m (6 ft 3 in)	27 – 10 August 1998
G/F	8	(Serbia)	Žunić, Matija	1.93 m (6 ft 4 in)	31 – 15 February 1994
SF	9	(Serbia)	Blagojević, Milić	2.01 m (6 ft 7 in)	34 – 10 January 1991
PG	10	(Serbia)	Simić, Nikola (C)	1.91 m (6 ft 3 in)	37 – 30 January 1988
PG	11	(United States)	Hannah, Supreme	1.83 m (6 ft 0 in)	31 – 17 May 1994
F/C	12	(Serbia)	Stojičić, Dušan	2.04 m (6 ft 8 in)	24 – 20 April 2001
SG	13	(Serbia)	Sinđelić, Vukašin	1.93 m (6 ft 4 in)	29 – 7 December 1995
C	14	(Serbia)	Andrejević, Stefan	2.09 m (6 ft 10 in)	32 – 3 August 1993
G	20	(Serbia)	Duvnjak, Uroš	1.91 m (6 ft 3 in)	38 – 19 November 1986
F/C	22	(Serbia)	Hadžifejzović, Sead	2.02 m (6 ft 8 in)	36 – 3 April 1989
SG	–	(Serbia)	Bačanac, Mihailo	1.88 m (6 ft 2 in)	22 – 25 May 2003
PF	–	(Bosnia and Herzegovina)	Pajić, Omar	2.06 m (6 ft 9 in)	26 – 24 August 1999
SF	–	(Serbia)	Grušanović, Mladen	2.02 m (6 ft 8 in)	28 – 3 March 1997

Head coach

- (Serbia) Darko Kostić

Legend

- (C) Team captain
- Injured

- Roster
Updated: July 24, 2022

== Coaches ==
- (Socialist Federal Republic of Yugoslavia) Boško Đokić
- (Socialist Federal Republic of Yugoslavia) Marijan Novović (1988–1989)
- (Federal Republic of Yugoslavia) Dragan Veljković (1990–1993)
- (Federal Republic of Yugoslavia) Rajko Maravić (1994–1995)
- (Federal Republic of Yugoslavia) Dejan Srzić (1997–1998)
- (Serbia) Srđan Jeković (2007–2009)
- (Serbia) Žarko Simić (2012–2015)
- (Serbia) Srđan Jeković (2015–2016)
- (Serbia) Žarko Simić (2016–2019)
- (Serbia) Dušan Radović (2019–2020)
- (Serbia) Marko Dimitrijević (2020–2021)
- (Serbia) Stevan Mijović (2021–2022)
- (Serbia) (Greece) Darko Kostić (2022–present)

== Trophies and awards ==
=== Trophies ===
- Second League of Serbia (2nd-tier)
  - Winners (1): 2018–19
- First Regional League (Central Division) (3rd-tier)
  - Winners (2): 2012–13, 2015–16

== Notable players ==
- (New Zealand) Nenad Vučinić
- (Serbia) Nikola Čvorović
- (United States) Brandon Penn

== See also ==
- FK Kolubara
