= OKK Novi Pazar =

Basketball club in Novi Pazar, Serbia

Novi Pazar Salamander
- Leagues: Basketball League of Serbia
- Founded: 1969; 56 years ago
- History: OKK Novi Pazar Salamander (1969–present)
- Arena: Pendik Sports Hall
- Capacity: 1,600
- Location: Novi Pazar, Serbia
- Team colors: Blue and White
- President: Bekim Corovic
- Team manager: Džemil Imamović
- Head coach: Milan Popić
- Championships: 1 National League Cup
- Website: okknovipazar.rs
Home	Away

Omladinski košarkaški klub Novi Pazar Salamander (Serbian Cyrillic: Омладински кошаркашки клуб Нови Пазар Саламандер, transl. Novi Pazar Salamander Youth Basketball Club), commonly referred to as OKK Novi Pazar Salamander or simply Novi Pazar Salamander, is a men's professional basketball club based in Novi Pazar, Serbia. They are currently competing in the Basketball League of Serbia.

== History ==
In the 2017–18 season, Novi Pazar placed second in the Second League of Serbia and got promoted to the Basketball League of Serbia for the 2018–19 season. The club won the 2019 Cup of Serbia.

== Players ==
=== Current roster ===
Note: Flags indicate national team eligibility at FIBA-sanctioned events. Players may hold other non-FIBA nationalities not displayed.

OKK Novi Pazar roster
Players
Coaches

Pos.	No.	Nat.	Name	Ht.	Age
SF	0	(Serbia)	Majstorović, Dušan	1.95 m (6 ft 5 in)	29 – 11 August 1995
PG	1	(United States)	Green Jr., Wendell	1.80 m (5 ft 11 in)	22 – 7 August 2002
G	4	(Serbia)	Novković, Matija	1.93 m (6 ft 4 in)	28 – 24 August 1996
SF	6	(Serbia)	Milić, Željko		22 – 29 March 2003
C	7	(Serbia)	Numanović, Asmir (C)	2.08 m (6 ft 10 in)	34 – 2 April 1991
SG	8	(Serbia)	Kulundžić, Luka	1.94 m (6 ft 4 in)	20 – 11 November 2004
G	9	(Serbia)	Mikavica, Bogdan	1.94 m (6 ft 4 in)	25 – 9 October 1999
PF	11	(Bosnia and Herzegovina)	Manjgafić, Fahrudin	2.07 m (6 ft 9 in)	28 – 21 January 1997
C	13	(Serbia)	Muratović, Džejlan	2.05 m (6 ft 9 in)	29 – 16 January 1996
C	14	(Serbia)	Radomirović, Vladimir	2.06 m (6 ft 9 in)	25 – 11 January 2000
PG	20	(Serbia)	Eminbegović, Emin	1.86 m (6 ft 1 in)	24 – 30 March 2001
F/C	24	(Serbia)	Đulović, Enis	2.03 m (6 ft 8 in)	27 – 29 November 1997
	55	(Turkey)	Paltaci, Erbey		21 – 10 May 2004
SG	77	(Serbia)	Islamović, Altin	2.00 m (6 ft 7 in)	25 – 14 February 2000

Head coach

- (Montenegro) Vasilije Budimić

Assistant coach(es)

- (Serbia) Ivica Vukotić

Legend

- (C) Team captain
- (L) On loan
- (TW) Two-way affiliate player
- Injured

- Roster
Updated: December 31, 2021

== Coaches ==
- (Serbia) Dragan Kostić (2015, 2016)
- (Serbia) Slađan Ivić (2016–2017)
- (Serbia) Marko Dimitrijević (2017)
- (Serbia) Boško Đokić (2017–2018)
- (Serbia) Oliver Popović (2018–2020)
- (Greece) (Serbia) Darko Kostić (2020–2022)
- (Montenegro) Vasilije Budimić (2022)
- (Serbia) Ivica Vukotić (2022–present)

== Trophies and awards ==
=== Trophies ===
- League Cup of Serbia (2nd-tier)
  - Winner (1): 2018–19

== See also ==
- FK Novi Pazar
