= KK Mladost SP =

Basketball club in Smederevska Palanka, Serbia

Mladost SP
- Leagues: Second Basketball League of Serbia
- Founded: 1970; 55 years ago
- History: KK Mladost SP (1970–present)
- Arena: Vuk Karadžić School Hall
- Capacity: 500
- Location: Smederevska Palanka, Serbia
- Team colors: Blue and White

Košarkaški klub Mladost SP (Serbian Cyrillic: Кошаркашки клуб Младост СП), commonly referred to as Mladost SP, is a men's professional basketball club based in Smederevska Palanka, Serbia. They are currently competing in the KLS League.

== Players ==
- Nikola Čvorović

== Head coaches ==
- (Serbia) Marko Dimitrijević (2016–2017)
- (Serbia) Zoran Todorović (2017, 2018–2019)
- (Serbia) Milovan Bogojević (2019–2020)
- (Serbia) Zlatan Rakić (2020–2021)
- (Serbia) Ivan Stefanović (2021–present)

== Trophies and awards ==
=== Trophies ===
- Second Regional League (West G2 Division) (4th-tier)
  - Winners (1): 2013–14
