= Second Basketball League of Serbia =

Second Men's League
- Founded: 2006; 20 years ago
- First season: 2006–07
- Country: Serbia
- Confederation: FIBA Europe
- Number of teams: 16
- Level on pyramid: 2nd
- Promotion to: First Men's League
- Relegation to: First Men's Regional League
- Domestic cup: Cup of Serbia
- Current champions: Hercegovac (1st title) (2024–25)
- Most championships: Jagodina; Radnički Beograd (2 titles)
- Website: lige.kss.rs
- 2024–25 season

Second Men's League of Serbia (Serbian Cyrillic: Друга мушка лига Србије, romanized: Druga muška liga Srbije), previously Basketball League of Serbia B, is the second-tier level men's professional basketball league in Serbia. Founded in 2006, it is run by the Basketball Federation of Serbia (KSS).

== Rules ==
=== Competition format ===
The league, operated by the Basketball Federation of Serbia, has 14 teams. From the 2012–13 season, the top two teams in Second League goes to First League of Serbia. The teams positioned 11th, 12th, 13th and 14th in Second will be relegated to the 3td tier – First Men's Regional League.

=== Arena standards ===
Currently, clubs must have home arenas with capacity of minimum 500 seats.

== History ==
The two first teams are promoted to the Basketball League of Serbia.

| Season | Champion | Runner-up | Champion's Coach | Ref. |
|---|---|---|---|---|
| 2006–07 | Radnički Invest Novi Sad | Vizura | (Serbia) Mladen Mikić | |
| 2007–08 | Tamiš Petrohemija | Metalac | (Serbia) Dragan Nikolić | |
| 2008–09 | Proleter | OKK Beograd | | |
| 2009–10 | Superfund | Crnokosa | (Serbia) Srđan Flajs | |
| 2010–11 | Radnički Belgrade | Radnički Basket Belgrade | (Serbia) Dragan Nikolić | |
| 2011–12 | Jagodina | Konstantin | (Serbia) Aleksandar Icić | |
| 2012–13 | Meridiana | Crnokosa | (Serbia) Filip Socek | |
| 2013–14 | Jagodina | Spartak | (Serbia) Miljan Marjanović | |
| 2014–15 | Mladost Zemun | Beovuk 72 | (Serbia) Dragan Nikolić | |
| 2015–16 | Dynamic BG | Dunav | (Serbia) Miroslav Nikolić | |
| 2016–17 | Zlatibor | Vojvodina | (Serbia) Dušan Radović | |
| 2017–18 | Sloboda | Novi Pazar | (Serbia) Vladimir Lučić | |
| 2018–19 | Kolubara LA 2003 | Napredak JKP | (Serbia) Žarko Simić | |
| 2019–20 | Canceled due to the COVID-19 pandemic in Serbia | | None | |
| 2020–21 | Zdravlje | Slodes | (Serbia) Lazar Spasić | |
| 2021–22 | Spartak Office Shoes | Čačak 94 | (Serbia) Srećko Sekulović | |
| 2022–23 | Radnički SPD | Joker | (Serbia) Stevan Mijović | |
| 2023–24 | Radnički Beograd | Mladost SP | (Serbia) Marko Boltić | |
| 2024–25 | Hercegovac | Borac | (Serbia) Aleksandar Komnenić | |
| 2025–26 | Kolubara LA 2003 | Niš Maxbet | (Serbia) Vladimir Marić | |

== Current clubs ==
Location of teams in the 2026–27 season

| Team | City | Arena | Capacity |
|---|---|---|---|
| Beko | Krnjača, Belgrade | Padinska Skela Hall | 600 |
| Vršac Meridianbet | Vršac | Millennium Center | 4,400 |
| Mladost SP | Smederevska Palanka | Sala OŠ "Vuk Karadžić" | 600 |
| Beovuk 72 | Rakovica, Belgrade | Hala Slodes | 700 |
| Klik | Arilje | Hala Gradski Park Arilje | 600 |
| Napredak Kruševac | Kruševac | Hala sportova Kruševac | 2,000 |
| Sombor | Sombor | Mostonga Hall | 1,000 |
| Loznica | Loznica | Lagator Hall | 2,236 |
| Zdravlje | Leskovac | Sports hall Partizan | 500 |
| Ivanjica | Ivanjica | Sala OŠ "Kirilo Savić", Ivanjica | 500 |
| Pirot | Pirot | Pirot Kej Hall | 835 |
| Proleter Naftagas | Zrenjanin | Crystal Hall | 2,800 |
| Konstantin | Niš | Sports hall "Mika Antić" | 500 |
| IBC | Zvezdara | [[]] | 0 |
| Apatin | Apatin | SC "Rade - Ratko Vejin" | 1,100 |
| Jagodina | Jagodina | JASSA Sports Center | 2,600 |

== Statistical leaders ==
Source: eurobasket.com

=== Points ===
| Season | Player | Team | PPG |
|---|---|---|---|
| 2006–07 | | | |
| 2007–08 | | | |
| 2008–09 | (Serbia) Ivan Dukanac | Mladost Čačak | 27.5 |
| 2009–10 | | | |
| 2010–11 | (Serbia) Dragan Bjelica | Viva Basket | 26.6 |
| 2011–12 | (Serbia) Dragan Bjelica | Viva Basket | 24.5 |
| 2012–13 | (Serbia) Mihajlo Andrić | Partizan B-team | 19.5 |
| 2013–14 | (Serbia) Vukan Živković | Železničar Inđija | 24.0 |
| 2014–15 | (Serbia) Dušan Domović Bulut | Meridiana | 23.6 |
| 2015–16 | (Serbia) Đorđo Đorđić | Srem | 21.3 |
| 2016–17 | (Serbia) Đorđo Đorđić | Srem | 19.7 |
| 2017–18 | (Serbia) Nikola Kostić | Plana | 21.7 |
| 2018–19 | (Serbia) Ivan Đurović | Vrbas | 23.6 |
| 2019–20 | (Serbia) Filip Barna | Spartak | 23.1 |
| 2020–21 | (Serbia) Nino Čelebić | Borac Zemun | 22.0 |
| 2021–22 | (Serbia) Marko Čakarević | Star | 19.1 |
| 2022–23 | (Serbia) Vuk Borovicanin | Beko | 24.7 |
| 2023–24 | (Serbia) Stefan Balmazović | Beko | 28.6 |
| 2024–25 | (Serbia) Ratko Arsovic | Klik | 23.6 |

=== Rebounds ===
| Season | Player | Team | RPG |
|---|---|---|---|
| 2006–07 | | | |
| 2007–08 | | | |
| 2008–09 | | | |
| 2009–10 | | | |
| 2010–11 | (Serbia) Nemanja Knežević | Vojvodina | 10.2 |
| 2011–12 | (Serbia) Aleksandar Vuletić | Viva Basket | 12.2 |
| 2012–13 | (Serbia) Miloš Janković | Mladost Čačak | 11.3 |
| 2013–14 | (Serbia) Srđan Grujić | Morava | 9.8 |
| 2014–15 | (Serbia) Miladin Kovačević | Plana | 9.1 |
| 2015–16 | (Serbia) Nemanja Subotić | Proleter Naftagas | 10.4 |
| 2016–17 | (Serbia) Ivan Demčešen | Jagodina | 9.8 |
| 2017–18 | (Serbia) Darko Rnić | Smederevo 1953 | 10.9 |
| 2018–19 | (Serbia) Mihailo Todorović | Plana | 13.5 |
| 2019–20 | (Serbia) Filip Barna | Spartak | 9.1 |
| 2020–21 | (Serbia) Dejan Bjelić | Klik | 10.2 |
| 2021–22 | (Serbia) Predrag Radovanović | Hercegovac | 10.8 |
| 2022–23 | (Serbia) Vuk Borovicanin | Beko | 10.0 |
| 2023–24 | (Serbia) Dimitrije Marić | Železničar Čačak | 14.3 |
| 2024–25 | (Serbia) Vuk Vasic | Pirot | 10.5 |

=== Assists ===
| Season | Player | Team | APG |
|---|---|---|---|
| 2006–07 | | | |
| 2007–08 | | | |
| 2008–09 | | | |
| 2009–10 | | | |
| 2010–11 | (Serbia) Dragan Bjelica | Viva Basket | 6.7 |
| 2011–12 | (Serbia) Dragan Bjelica | Viva Basket | 7.6 |
| 2012–13 | (Serbia) Perica Mitić | Morava | 6.1 |
| 2013–14 | (Serbia) Sanel Mukanović | Pirot | 7.6 |
| 2014–15 | (Serbia) Sanel Mukanović | Pirot | 7.7 |
| 2015–16 | (Serbia) Stefan Atanacković | Proleter Naftagas | 8.2 |
| 2016–17 | (Serbia) Stefan Atanacković | Proleter Naftagas | 7.0 |
| 2017–18 | (Serbia) Sanel Mukanović | Novi Pazar | 7.0 |
| 2018–19 | (Serbia) Sanel Mukanović | Pirot | 8.3 |
| 2019–20 | (Serbia) Vladimir Veličković | Zdravlje | 7.6 |
| 2020–21 | (Serbia) Nino Čelebić | Borac Zemun | 9.0 |
| 2021–22 | (Serbia) Petar Šparović | Mladost SP | 9.2 |
| 2022–23 | (Serbia) Petar Šparović | Mladost SP | 9.6 |
| 2023–24 | (Serbia) Aleksandar Vlahovic | KK Star | 8.9 |
| 2024–25 | (Serbia) Miloje Susic | Borac Zemun | 7.5 |

== See also ==
- YUBA B League (1991–2006)
- 1st B Federal Basketball League (1980–1992)
