= Veliki Park Hall =

- Hala Veliki Park
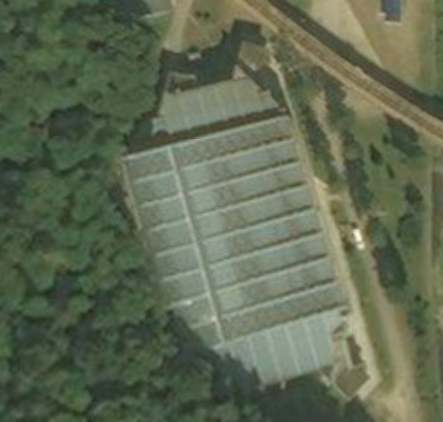
- Interactive map of Veliki Park Hall
- Location: Užice, Serbia
- Coordinates: 43°50′57.05″N 19°50′44.67″E
- Capacity: 2,200 (basketball); 3,500 (concerts)

Tenants
- KK Sloboda; OK Jedinstvo

Veliki Park Hall, known locally as Hala Veliki Park is an indoor sporting arena located in Užice, Serbia. The seating capacity of the arena is for 2,200 spectators for sports events and 3,500 at concerts.

It is currently home to the KK Sloboda basketball team and OK Jedinstvo volleyball team.

== See also ==
- List of indoor arenas in Serbia
