= KK Napredak Aleksinac =

Basketball club in Aleksinac, Serbia

Napredak Aleksinac
- Leagues: Second League of Serbia
- Founded: April 7, 1957; 68 years ago
- History: KK Mladost (1957–1976); KK Napredak (1976–napredak)
- Arena: Sports Hall Aleksinac (1,000)
- Location: Aleksinac, Serbia
- Team colors: Red and White
- President: Nenad Stojković
- Website: kknapredakaleksinac.org.rs

Košarkaški klub Napredak (Serbian Cyrillic: Кошаркашки клуб Напредак), commonly referred to as Napredak Aleksinac, is a men's professional basketball club based in Aleksinac, Serbia. They are currently competing in the Second League of Serbia.

The club has been competing in the Second Basketball League of Serbia since the 2011–12 season.

== Sponsorship naming ==
The club has had several denominations through the years due to its sponsorship:

- Napredak Maxi CO (2012–2016)
- Napredak Bosphorus (2016–2018)
- Napredak JKP (2018–2021)
- Napredak Metalka Majur (2021–2022)

== Coaches ==
- (Serbia) Predrag Jaćimović (2014–2015)
- (Serbia) Boško Đokić (2015–2016)
- (Serbia) Slobodan Nikolić (2016–2017)
- (Serbia) Nebojša Raičević (2017–2021)
- (Serbia) Dušan Jelić (2021)
- (Serbia) Slaviša Bogavac (2021–2022)
- (Serbia) Nenad Stojković (2022–2025)
- (Serbia) Dino Olenik (2025–present)

== Trophies and awards ==
=== Trophies ===
- Second League of Serbia (2nd-tier)
  - Runners-up (1): 2018–19
- First Regional League (East Division) (3rd-tier)
  - Winners (1): 2010–11

== Notable players ==
- (Serbia) Miloš Trailović
- (Serbia) Andreja Stevanović
