= SRC Dubočica =

Indoor sporting arena

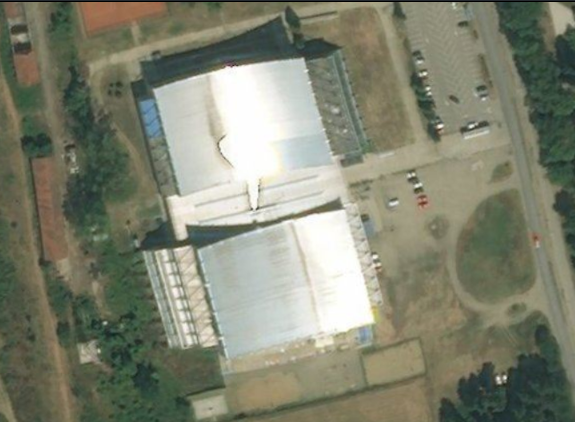
- Interactive map of SRC Dubočica
- Location: Vlajkova bb 16000; Leskovac, Serbia
- Coordinates: 42.9772°N 21.9506°E
- Owner: SRC Dubočica
- Capacity: 3,600-4,000

Construction
- Opened: 1983

Tenant
- KK Zdravlje

SRC Dubočica (Serbian Cyrillic: СРЦ Дубочица) is an indoor sporting arena located in Leskovac, Serbia. The capacity of the arena is 3,600 people. It is currently home to the Zdravlje basketball team.

== See also ==
- List of indoor arenas in Serbia
- Leskovac
