= KK Žarkovo =

Basketball club in Belgrade, Serbia

Žarkovo
- Leagues: First Regional League of Serbia
- Founded: 1975; 50 years ago
- History: KK Žarkovo (1975–present)
- Arena: Žarkovo Sports Hall
- Capacity: 800
- Location: Belgrade, Serbia
- Team colors: Green and White
- Website: kkzarkovo.com

Košarkaški klub Žarkovo (Serbian Cyrillic: Кошаркашки клуб Жарково), commonly referred to as KK Žarkovo, is a men's professional basketball club based in Belgrade, Serbia. They are currently competing in the First Regional League of Serbia (3rd-tier).

The club was founded in 1975 and was named after Žarkovo, an urban neighborhood of Belgrade.

== Coaches ==
- (Serbia) Đorđe Ilić (2018–2021)

== Trophies and awards ==
=== Trophies ===
- First Regional League (Central Division) (3rd-tier)
  - Winners (1): 2016–17
