= KK Smederevo 1953 =

Basketball club in Smederevo, Serbia

Smederevo 1953
- Leagues: Second Regional League of Serbia
- Founded: 1953; 73 years ago
- History: KK Metalac (1953–?); KK Smederevo 1953 (?–present)
- Arena: Sports Hall Smederevo, Smederevo (capacity: 3,000)
- Location: Smederevo, Serbia
- Team colors: Blue and White
- Championships: None
- Website: www.kksmederevo1953.rs
Home	Away

Košarkaški klub Smederevo 1953 (Serbian Cyrillic: Кошаркашки клуб Смедерево 1953), commonly referred to as KK Smederevo 1953, is a men's basketball club based in Smederevo, Serbia. The club currently plays in the Second Regional League of Serbia (4th-tier).

== History ==
The club was founded by students of the University of Belgrade on July 28, 1953, under the name of KK Metalac (Serbian Cyrillic: КК Металац). At that time, the club was part of the Metalac Sports Society. The first club president was Kosta Perović, while the first coach and the first player was Roman Bruj.

The 2011–12 season of KLS was the first time the club competed in the top professional club league in Serbia.

== Coaches ==
- (Serbia and Montenegro) Dragan Marinković
- (Serbia) Zoran Todorović

== Notable former players ==
- (Bulgaria) Branko Mirković
- (Georgia (country)) Goga Bitadze
- (Serbia) Ognjen Jaramaz
- (Serbia) Rade Zagorac
- (Serbia) Darko Balaban
