= OKK Konstantin =

Basketball club in Niš, Serbia

Konstantin
- Nickname: The Emperors
- Leagues: Second League of Serbia
- Founded: 2009; 16 years ago
- History: KK Sinđelić; 2009–2011; OKK Konstantin; 2011–present
- Arena: Čair Sports Center
- Capacity: 4,000
- Location: Niš, Serbia
- Team colors: Red, White and Blue
- President: Zvonko Milošević
- Head coach: Nikola Bogdanović
- Website: www.konstantinokk.rs

Omladinski košarkaški klub Konstantin (Serbian Cyrillic: Омладински кошаркашки клуб Константин), commonly referred to as OKK Konstantin or simply Konstantin, is a men's professional basketball club based in Niš, Serbia. They are currently competing in the Second Basketball League of Serbia.

== Home arena ==
Konstantin plays their domestic home games at the Čair Sports Center, located in Niš. It has a seating capacity of 4,000.

== Players ==
- Aleksandar Mladenović

 * Petar Ćirić

== Coaches ==
- (Serbia) Jovica Antonić (2011–2012)
- (Serbia) Boško Đokić (2012–2013)
- (Serbia) Marko Cvetković (2013–2016)
- (Serbia) Predrag Jaćimović (2016–2017)
- (Serbia) Marko Cvetković (2017)
- (Serbia) Slobodan Nikolić (2018)
- (Serbia) Marko Cvetković (2018–2020)
- (Serbia) Dušan Radović (2020–2021)
- (Serbia) Ljubiša Damjanović (2021–present)
- SRB Milan Tubić 2022/2023
- SRB Milan Tubić 2023/2024

== See also ==
- KK Ergonom
