= Serbian basketball league system =

The Serbian basketball league system, or Serbian basketball league pyramid is a series of interconnected competitions for professional basketball clubs in Serbia. The system has a hierarchical format with a promotion and demotion system between competitions at different levels.

== Men ==
There are currently five different competitions on the pyramid - the 1st tier Basketball League of Serbia, the 2nd tier Second Basketball League of Serbia, the 3rd tier First Regional League, the 4th tier Second Regional League, which comprises the lower level regional divisions.

Basketball League of Serbia and Basketball League of Serbia B are organized by the Basketball Federation of Serbia while the lower tiers are organized by the Regional Federations.

=== The tier levels ===
For the 2023–24 season, the Serbian basketball league system is as follows:

Level	League									
ABA	Adriatic League First Division (5 out of 12 teams)									
ABA	Adriatic League Second Division (3 out of 12 teams)									
1	Super League of Serbia (8 teams)									
1	Basketball League of Serbia (16 teams)									
2	Second Basketball League of Serbia (16 teams)									
3	First Regional League North (16 teams)			First Regional League Central 1 (8 teams)	First Regional League Central 2 (8 teams)	First Regional League East (14 teams)	First Regional League West A (8 teams)		First Regional League West B (8 teams)	
4	Second Regional League; Group North A (9 teams)	Second Regional League; Group North B (10 teams)	Second Regional League; Group South (10 teams)	Second Regional League Central (9 teams)		Second Regional League East (12 teams)	Second Regional League West; Group 1A (8 teams)	Second Regional League West; Group 2A (8 teams)	Second Regional League West; Group 1B (7 teams)	Second Regional League West; Group 2B (8 teams)
5	Local Summer Leagues									

==== Level 5 – Local Summer Leagues ====
Level 4	Level 5	Districts
North Division – Group North	Bačka Division	South Bačka District
North Division – Group North	Bačka Division	North Bačka District
North Division – Group North	Bačka Division	West Bačka District
North Division – Group North	North Banat Division	Central Banat District
North Division – Group North	North Banat Division	North Banat District
North Division – Group South	South Banat Division	South Banat District
North Division – Group South	Srem Division	Srem District
Central Division	Belgrade Division	Belgrade
East Division	East Serbia Division	Nišava District
East Division	East Serbia Division	Pirot District
East Division	East Serbia Division	Zaječar District
East Division	East Serbia Division	Bor District
East Division	South Serbia Division	Jablanica District
East Division	South Serbia Division	Pčinja District
East Division	South Serbia Division	Toplica District
West Division – Group One	West Serbia Division	Mačva District
West Division – Group One	West Serbia Division	Kolubara District
West Division – Group One	West Serbia Division	Moravica District
West Division – Group One	West Serbia Division	Zlatibor District
West Division – Group Two	Central Serbia Division	Šumadija District
West Division – Group Two	Central Serbia Division	Pomoravlje District
West Division – Group Two	Central Serbia Division	Rasina District
West Division – Group Two	Central Serbia Division	Braničevo District
West Division – Group Two	Central Serbia Division	Podunavlje District
West Division – Group Two	Raška–Kosovo Division	Raška District
West Division – Group Two	Raška–Kosovo Division	Kosovo and Metohija Districts

=== Other competitions ===
- Radivoj Korać Cup (1st tier)
- Basketball Cup of Serbia (2nd tier)

== Women ==
Since the 2006–07 season, there are currently different competitions on the pyramid.

1. First Women's Basketball League of Serbia, organized by the Basketball Federation of Serbia and composed of 10 teams.
2. Second Women's Basketball League of Serbia, organized by the Basketball Federation of Serbia and composed of 10 teams.
3. First Women's Regional Basketball League

Level	League			
1	First League of Serbia (10 teams)			
2	Second League of Serbia (10 teams)			
3	Regional League of Serbia North 1 (8 teams)	Regional League of Serbia North 2 (8 teams)	Regional League of Serbia South 1 (6 teams)	Regional League of Serbia South 2 (10 teams)

=== Other competitions ===
- Milan Ciga Vasojević Cup

== See also ==
- League system
- European professional club basketball system
- Spanish basketball league system
- Greek basketball league system
- Italian basketball league system
- French basketball league system
- Russian basketball league system
- Turkish basketball league system
- German basketball league system
- Polish basketball league system
- Hungarian basketball league system
- South American professional club basketball system
