= 2014–15 KK Crvena zvezda season =

Serbian basketball club season

Crvena zvezda Telekom
2014–15 season
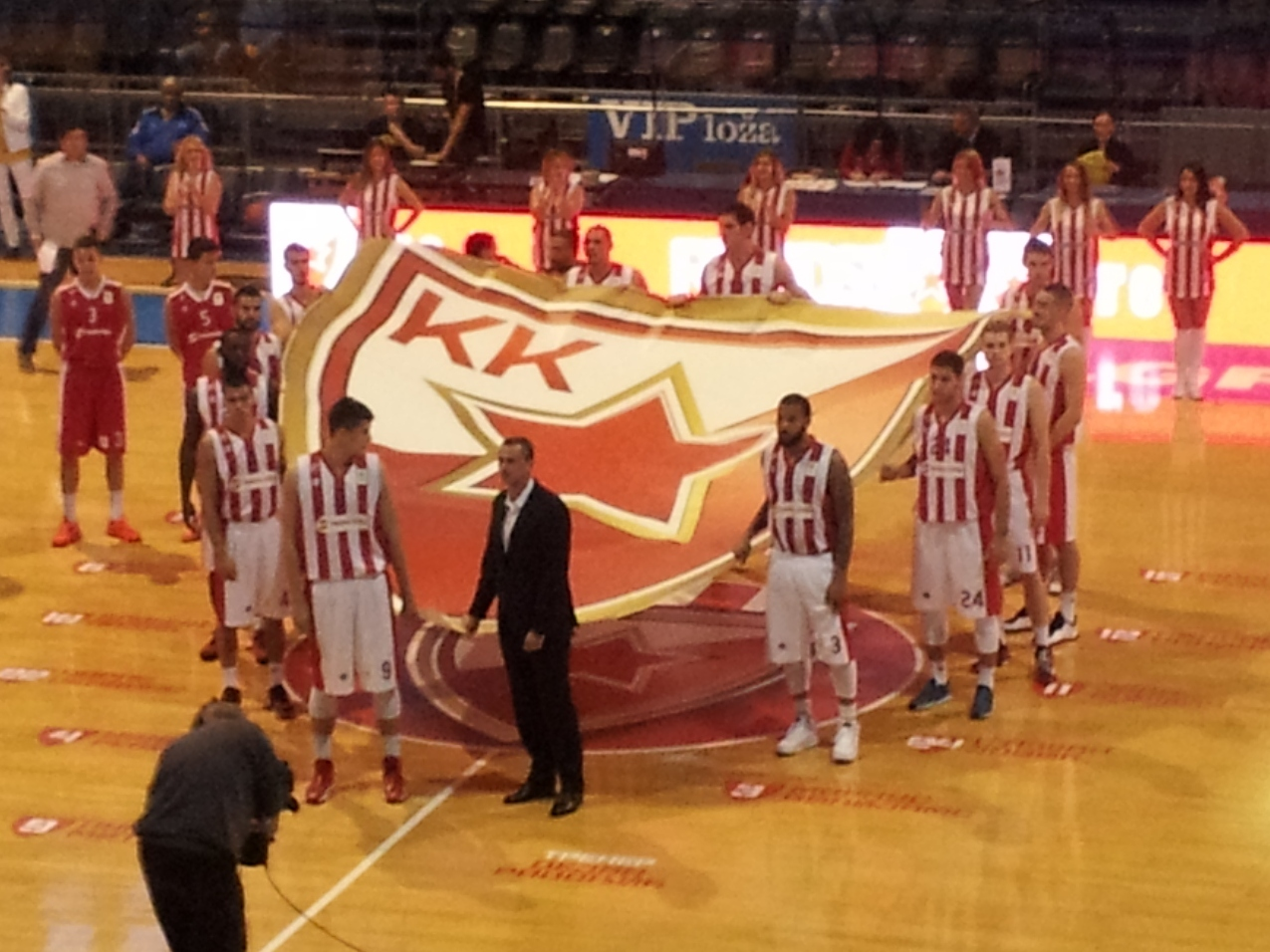
- Crvena zvezda players ahead of their 2014-15 Adriatic League opening game versus Levski on 3 October 2014.
- President: (Serbia) Nebojša Čović
- Head coach: (Montenegro) Dejan Radonjić
- Arena: Pionir Hall; Kombank Arena
- Serbian League: 1st
- Playoffs: Champions
- Adriatic League: 1st
- Playoffs: Champions
- EuroLeague: Top 16
- Radivoj Korać Cup: Winner
- Highest home attendance: 18,733 (Note: Euroleague season record); 72–79 Real Madrid (2 January 2015)
Home	Away
- All statistics correct as of March 30, 2018.

The 2014–15 season is Crvena zvezda's 70th season in the existence of the club. The team played in the Basketball League of Serbia, in the Adriatic League and in the Euroleague.

== Overview ==
In the summer of 2014, Red Star signed Nikola Kalinić and Stefan Jović from Radnički Kragujevac, NBA prospect Nemanja Dangubić, center Maik Zirbes and finalized a huge signing of point guard Marcus Williams. In the 2014-2015 season, the club participated in the EuroLeague, winning 6 out of 10 games in the regular season, reaching Top 16 and seeing its average home attendance rising to 14,483. In the Adriatic league, it set a new record of 20 consecutive victories, ending league competition with a record of 24–2, losing only to Krka and Partizan. In the playoffs, Zvezda triumphed over Partizan 3–1 in the semifinals, and 3–1 over Cedevita Zagreb in the finals, winning its first trophy in this competition and securing a place in the Euroleague for the 2015–2016 season. Zvezda also won the Radivoj Korać Cup for the third time in a row. In the Basketball League of Serbia, Zvezda entered the playoffs with 13 wins and only one loss. In the semifinals, they defeated Mega Leks 2–0, and in the final triumphed over Zvezda's greatest rival, Partizan, 3–0.

== Players ==
=== Squad information ===
Note: Flags indicate national team eligibility at FIBA sanctioned events. Players may hold other non-FIBA nationality not displayed.

Crvena zvezda roster
Players
Coaches

Pos.	No.	Nat.	Name	Ht.	Wt.	Age
SG	7	(Serbia)	Aranitović, Aleksandar	1.95 m (6 ft 5 in)	91 kg (201 lb)	28 – 24 January 1998
G/F	11	(Slovenia)	Blažič, Jaka	1.96 m (6 ft 5 in)	96 kg (212 lb)	36 – 30 June 1990
G/F	6	(Serbia)	Dangubić, Nemanja	2.04 m (6 ft 8 in)	88 kg (194 lb)	33 – 13 April 1993
PG	24	(Serbia)	Jović, Stefan	1.98 m (6 ft 6 in)	94 kg (207 lb)	36 – 3 November 1990
G	22	(United States)	Jenkins, Charles	1.91 m (6 ft 3 in)	100 kg (220 lb)	37 – 28 February 1989
F	12	(Serbia)	Kalinić, Nikola	2.03 m (6 ft 8 in)	101 kg (223 lb)	35 – 8 November 1991
C	14	(Serbia)	Kaplanović, Đorđe	2.10 m (6 ft 11 in)	102 kg (225 lb)	31 – 21 March 1995
G/F	10	(Serbia)	Lazić, Branko	1.95 m (6 ft 5 in)	87 kg (192 lb)	37 – 12 January 1989
C	13	(Serbia)	Marjanović, Boban	2.21 m (7 ft 3 in)	132 kg (291 lb)	38 – 15 August 1988
PF	9	(Serbia)	Mitrović, Luka (C)	2.05 m (6 ft 9 in)	102 kg (225 lb)	33 – 21 March 1993
PG	4	(Serbia)	Rebić, Nikola	1.88 m (6 ft 2 in)	80 kg (176 lb)	31 – 22 January 1995
PF	15	(Serbia)	Tejić, Marko	2.10 m (6 ft 11 in)	105 kg (231 lb)	31 – 4 August 1995
PG	3	(United States)	Williams, Marcus	1.91 m (6 ft 3 in)	95 kg (209 lb)	40 – 3 December 1985
C	33	(Germany)	Zirbes, Maik	2.08 m (6 ft 10 in)	115 kg (254 lb)	36 – 29 January 1990

Head coach

- (Montenegro) Dejan Radonjić

Assistant coach(es)

- (Montenegro) Borko Radović
- (Serbia) Saša Kosović

Team manager

- (Serbia) Nebojša Ilić

Legend

- (C) Team captain
- Injured

- Roster
Updated: 22 April 2015

=== Depth chart ===
Pos.	Starting 5	Bench 1	Bench 2	Reserves
C	Boban Marjanović	Maik Zirbes		Đorđe Kaplanović
PF	Luka Mitrović	Marko Tejić
SF	Nikola Kalinić	Nemanja Dangubić
SG	Charles Jenkins	Branko Lazić	Jaka Blažič	Aleksandar Aranitović
PG	Marcus Williams	Stefan Jović	Nikola Rebić

=== Players with multiple nationalities ===
- (Serbia) (Montenegro) Đorđe Kaplanović

=== Out on loan ===
KK Crvena zvezda players out on loan
Nat.	Player	Position	Team	On loan since
(Serbia)	Brano Đukanović	SG	(Serbia) FMP	August 2013
(Serbia)	Ognjen Dobrić	SG/SF	(Serbia) FMP	August 2014
(Serbia)	Stefan Lazarević	SG/SF	(Serbia) FMP	August 2014
(Serbia)	Marko Radovanović	PF	(Serbia) FMP	August 2014
(Serbia)	Marko Gudurić	SF	(Serbia) FMP	August 2014
(Serbia)	Boriša Simanić	PF	(Serbia) FMP	August 2014
(Serbia)	Danilo Ostojić	SF	(Serbia) FMP	August 2014
(Serbia)	Vojislav Stojanović	SG/SF	(Serbia) FMP	August 2014
(Serbia)	Nikola Čvorović	SG/SF	(Serbia) FMP	April 2015

=== Players In ===
Position	#	Player	Moving from	Ref.
F	12	(Serbia) Nikola Kalinić	(Serbia) Radnički Kragujevac	
SF	6	(Serbia) Nemanja Dangubić	(Serbia) Mega Vizura	
C	33	(Germany) Maik Zirbes	(Germany) Brose Baskets	
PG	3	(United States) Marcus Williams	(Russia) Lokomotiv Kuban	
PG	24	(Serbia) Stefan Jović	(Serbia) Radnički Kragujevac	
C	14	(Serbia) Đorđe Kaplanović	(Serbia) FMP	
SF	5	(Serbia) Nikola Čvorović	(Serbia) FMP	
SG	7	(Serbia) Aleksandar Aranitović	(Serbia) Crvena zvezda U18	
SG	20	(Serbia) Aleksa Radanov	(Serbia) Crvena zvezda U18	

=== Players Out ===
Position	#	Player	Moving to	Ref.
PG/SG	20	(United States) DeMarcus Nelson	(Greece) Panathinaikos	
SF	12	(Serbia) Marko Simonović	(France) Élan Béarnais Pau-Orthez	
PF	34	(Serbia) Tadija Dragićević	(France) SIG Strasbourg	
C	15	(Serbia) Raško Katić	(Spain) CAI Zaragoza	
PF/C	14	(Serbia) Ivan Radenović	Free Agent	
PG	31	(Ukraine) Oleksandr Lypovyy	(Ukraine) Budivelnyk	
SF	5	(Serbia) Nikola Čvorović	(Serbia) FMP (Loan)	

== Club ==
=== Technical Staff ===
Position	Staff member
General Manager	(Serbia) Davor Ristović
Sports Director	(Serbia) Mirko Pavlović
Team Manager	(Serbia) Nebojša Ilić
Head coach	(Montenegro) Dejan Radonjić
Assistant coaches	(Montenegro) Borko Radović
Assistant coaches	(Serbia) Nikola Birač
Assistant coaches	(Serbia) Saša Kosović
Conditioning coach	(Montenegro) Dragan Gačević
Physiotherapist	(Serbia) Milorad Ćirić

=== Kit ===
- Supplier: Champion
- Main sponsor: mts
- Back sponsor: Idea
- Short sponsor:

Home	Away

== Competitions ==
=== Overall ===
Competition	Started round	Final position / round	First match	Last match
Adriatic League	Matchday 1	Champions	October 3, 2014	April 30, 2015
EuroLeague	Matchday 1	Top 16	October 15, 2014	April 9, 2015
Serbian Super League	Matchday 1	Champions	March 29, 2015	June 18, 2015
Radivoj Korać Cup	Quarterfinals	Winner	February 20, 2015	February 22, 2015

Source: Competitions

=== Overview ===
Competition	Record							
Competition	Pld	W	D	L	PF	PA	PD	Win %
Adriatic League	26	24	0	2	2,147	1,790	+357	92.31
Adriatic League Playoffs	8	6	0	2	605	567	+38	75.00
Serbian League	14	13	0	1	1,233	995	+238	92.86
Serbian League Playoffs	5	5	0	0	407	356	+51	100.00
Radivoj Korać Cup	3	3	0	0	237	206	+31	100.00
EuroLeague	10	6	0	4	784	728	+56	60.00
EuroLeague Top 16	14	4	0	10	1,025	1,059	−34	28.57
Total	80	61	0	19	6,438	5,701	+737	76.25

Last updated: April 1, 2018
Source: Competitions

=== Adriatic League ===
==== League table ====
Pos	Team	Pld	W	L	PF	PA	PD	Pts	Qualification or relegation
1	(Serbia) Crvena Zvezda	26	24	2	2147	1790	+357	50	Qualification to playoffs
2	(Montenegro) Budućnost VOLI	26	19	7	1993	1816	+177	45	Qualification to playoffs
3	(Croatia) Cedevita	26	18	8	2004	1838	+166	44	Qualification to playoffs
4	(Serbia) Partizan	26	18	8	1924	1778	+146	44	Qualification to playoffs
5	(Slovenia) Union Olimpija	26	15	11	1952	1849	+103	41	

Source: ABA League

==== Results by round ====
Round	1	2	3	4	5	6	7	8	9	10	11	12	13	14	15	16	17	18	19	20	21	22	23	24	25	26
Ground																										
Result	W	W	W	W	W	W	W	W	W	W	W	W	W	W	W	W	W	W	W	W	L	W	L	W	W	W
Position	1	1	1	1	1	1	1	1	1	1	1	1	1	1	1	1	1	1	1	1	1	1	1	1	1	1

Source: Competitive matches
Ground: A = Away; H = Home; R = Rest. Result: L = Loss; W = Win; R = Rest; P = Postponed.

Win Loss

==== Playoffs ====
14 April 2015 Semifinals 1	Crvena zvezda (Serbia)	73–64 (Series: 1–0)	(Serbia) Partizan	Pionir Hall, Belgrade
21:00	Scoring by quarter: 24–13, 14–18, 17–21, 18–12
	Pts: Jenkins 19; Rebs: Marjanović 9 Asts: Williams, Kalinić 3	Report	Pts: Mačvan 12; Rebs: Mačvan 12; Asts: Mačvan 5	Attendance: 5,932; Referees: Sreten Radović, Milivoje Jovčić, Damir Javor

15 April 2015 Semifinals 2	Crvena zvezda (Serbia)	68–70 (Series: 1–1)	(Serbia) Partizan	Pionir Hall, Belgrade
21:00	Scoring by quarter: 17–22, 18–20, 13–16, 20–12
	Pts: Jenkins 19; Rebs: Marjanović 8 Asts: Williams 3	Report	Pts: Mačvan 14; Rebs: Mačvan 17; Asts: Milutinov 4	Attendance: 5,983; Referees: Srđan Dožai, Matej Boltauzer, Siniša Herceg

18 April 2015 Semifinals 3	Partizan (Serbia)	85–95 (Series: 1–2)	(Serbia) Crvena zvezda	Pionir Hall, Belgrade
21:00	Scoring by quarter: 20–26, 24–25, 18–22, 23–22
	Pts: Milosavljević 23; Rebs: Mačvan 5 Asts: Tepić 3	Report	Pts: Kalinić 25; Rebs: Mitrović 9 Asts: Mitrović 5	Attendance: 7,000; Referees: Ilija Belošević, Sreten Radović, Damir Javor

19 April 2015 Semifinals 4	Partizan (Serbia)	73–81 (Series: 1–3)	(Serbia) Crvena zvezda	Pionir Hall, Belgrade
21:00	Scoring by quarter: 24–22, 12–16, 22–26, 15–17
	Pts: Murić 25; Rebs: Milutinov 8 Asts: Murić, Milosavljević 3	Report	Pts: Williams, Jenkins 19; Rebs: Marjanović 14; Asts: 3 players 3	Attendance: 7,000; Referees: Saša Pukl, Sašo Petek, Tomislav Hordov

25 April 2015 Finals 1	Crvena Zvezda (Serbia)	68–59 (Series: 1–0)	(Croatia) Cedevita	Pionir Hall, Belgrade
21:00	Scoring by quarter: 24–9, 18–15, 12–20, 14–15
	Pts: Mitrović 18; Rebs: Marjanović 12; Asts: Williams 5	Report	Pts: Babić 12; Rebs: Bilan 8 Asts: Žganec, Ukić 4	Attendance: 5,526; Referees: Saša Pukl, Zdravko Rutešić, Miloš Koljenšić

26 April 2015 Finals 2	Crvena Zvezda (Serbia)	69–65 (Series: 2–0)	(Croatia) Cedevita	Pionir Hall, Belgrade
20:30	Scoring by quarter: 22–8, 18–24, 18–16, 11–17
	Pts: Marjanović 20; Rebs: Marjanović 14; Asts: Marjanović 5	Report	Pts: Babić 14; Rebs: Žganec 8 Asts: Ukić 10	Attendance: 5,405; Referees: Matej Boltauzer, Sašo Petek, Mario Majkič

29 April 2015 Finals 3	Cedevita (Croatia)	72–62 (Series: 1–2)	(Serbia) Crvena zvezda	Dom Sportova, Zagreb
20:30	Scoring by quarter: 23–16, 18–17, 27–13, 4–16
	Pts: Barać 15; Rebs: Zubčić, Žganec 6 Asts: Ukić 4	Report	Pts: Marjanović 16; Rebs: Kalinić 7 Asts: Mitrović 2	Attendance: 3,100; Referees: Matej Boltauzer, Damir Javor, Miloš Koljenšić

30 April 2015 Finals 4	Cedevita (Croatia)	79–89 (Series: 1–3)	(Serbia) Crvena zvezda	Dom Sportova, Zagreb
20:30	Scoring by quarter: 25–30, 10–22, 23–17, 21–20
	Pts: Zubčić 15; Rebs: Barać 4 Asts: Gordić 4	Report	Pts: Jenkins 17; Rebs: Kalinić 8 Asts: 4 players 3	Attendance: 3,050; Referees: Saša Pukl, Sašo Petek, Mario Majkič

=== EuroLeague ===
==== Regular season table ====
Pos	Team	Pld	W	L	PF	PA	PD	Tie
1	(Greece) Olympiacos	10	8	2	748	711	+37	
2	(Serbia) Crvena zvezda	10	6	4	784	728	+56	
3	(Spain) Laboral Kutxa	10	5	5	803	798	+5	
4	(Turkey) Galatasaray Liv Hospital	10	4	6	803	818	−15	1–1 (+16)
5	(Lithuania) Neptūnas	10	4	6	763	857	−94	1–1 (–16)

Win Loss

==== Regular season matches ====
Source: EuroLeague

16 October 2014 1	Crvena Zvezda (Serbia)	76–68	(Turkey) Galatasaray	Belgrade
20:45	Scoring by quarter: 17–20, 29–10, 17–18, 13–20
	Pts: Marjanović 22; Rebs: Marjanović 10; Asts: Williams 7	Report	Pts: Erceg 17; Rebs: Erceg 8 Asts: Arroyo 5	Arena: Kombank Arena; Attendance: 16,834 (Tentative); Referees: Antonio Conde (ESP), Panagiotis Anastopoulos (GRE), Seffi Shemmesh (ISR)

23 October 2014 2	Neptūnas (Lithuania)	83–81	(Serbia) Crvena Zvezda	Klaipėda
18:00	Scoring by quarter: 25-20, 22-17, 20-24, 16-20
	Pts: Gailius 19; Rebs: Gailius, Galdikas, Zavackas 7 Asts: Shakur 6	Report	Pts: Williams 23; Rebs: Mitrović 10; Asts: Williams 6	Arena: Švyturys Arena; Attendance: 5,309; Referees: Recep Ankarali (TUR), Gianluca Mattioli (ITA), Carlos Peruga (ESP)

30 October 2014 3	Crvena Zvezda (Serbia)	76–63	(Spain) Valencia	Belgrade
19:00	Scoring by quarter: 21-16, 18-10, 26-16, 11-21
	Pts: Marjanović 16; Rebs: Marjanović 9 Asts: Williams 8	Report	Pts: Buycks 14; Rebs: Sato 7 Asts: Vives 3	Arena: Kombank Arena; Attendance: 15,820; Referees: Luigi Lamonica (ITA), Boris Shulga (UKR), Sergiy Zashchuk (UKR)

7 November 2014 4	Crvena Zvezda (Serbia)	57–62	(Greece) Olympiacos	Belgrade
19:00	Scoring by quarter: 14-13, 12-24, 10-13, 21-12
	Pts: Marjanović 13; Rebs: Marjanović 14; Asts: Williams, Mitrović 4	Report	Pts: Spanoulis 14; Rebs: Agravanis 9 Asts: Sloukas 5	Arena: Kombank Arena; Attendance: 18,732; Referees: Dani Hierrezuelo (ESP), Eddie Viator (FRA), Rustu Nuran (TUR)

13 November 2014 5	Laboral Kutxa (Spain)	66–86	(Serbia) Crvena Zvezda	Vitoria-Gasteiz
20:30	Scoring by quarter: 22-21, 12-20, 16-25, 16-20
	Pts: Shengelia 20; Rebs: Shengelia 5 Asts: Heurtel 7	Report	Pts: Mitrović 17; Rebs: Kalinić 8 Asts: Williams 6	Arena: Fernando Buesa Arenad; Attendance: 8,064; Referees: Spiros Gkontas (GRE), Marek Cmikiewicz (POL), Anastasios Piloidis (GRE)

21 November 2014 6	Galatasaray (Turkey)	110–103(OT)	(Serbia) Crvena Zvezda	Istanbul
19:00	Scoring by quarter: 22-16, 23-24, 9-23, 28-19, Overtime: 1414 2OT = 14 7
	Pts: Erceg 32; Rebs: Güler 8 Asts: Arroyo, Arslan 6	Report	Pts: Mitrovic 30; Rebs: Marjanovic 17; Asts: Williams 17	Arena: Abdi İpekçi Arena; Attendance: 8,582; Referees: Paolo Taurino (ITA), Tomas Jasevicius (LTU), Aare Halliko (EST)

27 November 2014 7	Crvena Zvezda (Serbia)	79–62	(Lithuania) Neptūnas	Belgrade
19:00	Scoring by quarter: 22-14, 13-23, 27-10, 17-15
	Pts: Marjanovic 24; Rebs: Marjanovic 12; Asts: Williams 7	Report	Pts: Gailius 18; Rebs: Benson, Zavackas 7 Asts: Gailius 6	Arena: Kombank Arena; Attendance: 12,547; Referees: Vicente Bulto (ESP), Elias Koromilas (GRE), Piotr Pastusiak (POL)

5 December 2014 8	Valencia (Spain)	68–77	(Serbia) Crvena Zvezda	Valencia
21:00	Scoring by quarter: 16-20, 21-22, 15-20, 16-15
	Pts: Dubljević 22; Rebs: Lučić 6 Asts: Ribas 6	Report	Pts: Marjanović 18; Rebs: Marjanović 11; Asts: Mitrović 6	Arena: Pabellón Fuente San Luis; Attendance: 6,387; Referees: Roberto Chiari (ITA), Jakub Zamojski (POL), Joseph Bissang (FRA)

12 December 2014 9	Olympiacos (Greece)	64–59	(Serbia) Crvena Zvezda	Piraeus
20:30	Scoring by quarter: 13-16, 14-12, 15-20, 22-11
	Pts: Spanoulis 15; Rebs: Petway 7 Asts: Sloukas 5	Report	Pts: Marjanović 17; Rebs: Marjanović 13; Asts: Williams, Jović 4	Arena: Peace and Friendship Stadium; Attendance: 11,573; Referees: Borys Ryzhyk (UKR), Piotr Pastusiak (POL), David Romano (ISR)

19 December 2014 10	Crvena Zvezda (Serbia)	90–82	(Spain) Laboral Kutxa	Belgrade
19:00	Scoring by quarter: 18-18, 28-27, 24-18, 20-19
	Pts: Williams 23; Rebs: Marjanović 12; Asts: Williams 8	Report	Pts: Bertāns 16; Rebs: Tillie 7 Asts: Heurtel 7	Arena: Pionir Hall; Attendance: 0 Referees: Luigi Lamonica (ITA), Paolo Taurino (ITA), Sergiy Zashchuk (UKR)

==== Top 16 table ====
Pos	Team	Pld	W	L	PF	PA	PD	Tie
4	(Greece) Panathinaikos	14	7	7	1048	1022	+26	1–1 (+4)
5	(Germany) Alba Berlin	14	7	7	976	1031	−55	1–1 (–4)
6	(Lithuania) Žalgiris	14	5	9	1004	1075	−71	
7	(Serbia) Crvena zvezda	14	4	10	1025	1059	−34	
8	(Turkey) Galatasaray	14	2	12	1023	1167	−144	

Win Loss

==== Top 16 matches ====
Source: EuroLeague

2 January 2015 1	Crvena Zvezda (Serbia)	72–79	(Spain) Real Madrid	Belgrade
19:00	Scoring by quarter: 12–15, 19–19, 14–24, 27–21
	Pts: Mitrović, Zirbes 13; Rebs: Marjanović 7 Asts: Jović 9	Report	Pts: Fernández 15; Rebs: Fernández 6 Asts: Llull 9	Arena: Kombank Arena; Attendance: 18,733; Referees: Christos Christodoulou (GRE), Spiros Gkontas (GRE), Nicola Maestre (FRA)

8 January 2015 2	Maccabi Tel Aviv (Israel)	78–67	(Serbia) Crvena Zvezda	Tel Aviv
20:05	Scoring by quarter: 21–18, 16–15, 19–16, 22–18
	Pts: Randle 16; Rebs: Smith 10; Asts: Ohayon 8	Report	Pts: Kalinić 18; Rebs: Blažič, Marjanović 8 Asts: Williams 9	Arena: Menora Mivtachim Arena; Attendance: 10,728; Referees: Juan Carlos Garcia Gonzalez (ESP), Antonio Conde (ESP), Petros Papapetrou (GRE)

16 January 2015 3	Crvena Zvezda (Serbia)	65–74	(Turkey) Galatasaray	Belgrade
20:45	Scoring by quarter: 19–21, 16–12, 12–18, 18–23
	Pts: Marjanović 18; Rebs: Marjanović, Zirbes 7 Asts: Williams 4	Boxscore	Pts: Micov 12; Rebs: Maric 7 Asts: Arroyo, Micov 3	Arena: Kombank Arena; Attendance: 17,821; Referees: Dani Hierrenzuelo (ESP), Olegs Latisevs (LAT), Piotr Pastusiak (POL)

23 January 2015 4	FC Barcelona (Spain)	92–77	(Serbia) Crvena Zvezda	Barcelona
20:45	Scoring by quarter: 27–21, 22–17, 21–21, 22–18
	Pts: Abrines 15; Rebs: Tomić 10; Asts: Huertas 7	Report	Pts: Blažič 13; Rebs: Marjanović 7 Asts: Williams, Jović 3	Arena: Palau Blaugrana; Attendance: 7,340; Referees: Borys Ryzhyk (UKR), Roberto Chiari (ITA), Ioannis Foufis (GRE)

29 January 2015 5	Crvena Zvezda (Serbia)	86–69	(Germany) Alba Berlin	Belgrade
20:45	Scoring by quarter: 22–12, 25–17, 17–18, 22–22
	Pts: Marjanović 17; Rebs: Marjanović 12; Asts: Williams 10	Report	Pts: McLean 14; Rebs: Renfroe 8 Asts: Renfroe 4	Arena: Pionir Hall; Attendance: 5,908; Referees: Luigi Lamonica (ITA), Elias Koromilas (GRE), Boris Shulga (UKR)

5 February 2015 6	Crvena Zvezda (Serbia)	68–70	(Lithuania) Žalgiris	Belgrade
20:45	Scoring by quarter: 13–20, 21–19, 15–14, 19–17
	Pts: Marjanović 17; Rebs: Marjanović 10; Asts: Williams 7	Report	Pts: Anderson 22; Rebs: Jankūnas 8 Asts: Lekavičius, Milaknis 3	Arena: Kombank Arena; Attendance: 18,382; Referees: Juan Carlos Garcia Gonzalez (ESP), Spiros Gkontas (GRE), Carlos Cortes (ESP)

13 February 2015 7	Panathinaikos (Greece)	74–69	(Serbia) Crvena Zvezda	Athens
20:45	Scoring by quarter: 26–6, 11–23, 15–22, 22–18
	Pts: Slaughter 16; Rebs: Fotsis, Gist 5 Asts: Diamantidis 10	Report	Pts: Jenkins, Marjanović 17; Rebs: Marjanović 10; Asts: Kalinić 4	Arena: O.A.C.A. Attendance: 10,101; Referees: Vicente Bulto (ESP), Tolga Sahin (ITA), Sergiy Zashchuk (UKR)

26 February 2015 8	Real Madrid (Spain)	85–61	(Serbia) Crvena Zvezda	Madrid
20:45	Scoring by quarter: 16–18, 24–11, 20–17, 25–15
	Pts: Carroll 17; Rebs: Reyes, Slaughter 5 Asts: Llull 7	Report	Pts: Marjanović 21; Rebs: Marjanović 13; Asts: Williams 8	Arena: Palacio de Deportes de la Comunidad de Madrid; Attendance: 11,385; Referees: Robert Lottermoser (GER), Roberto Chiari (ITA), Anastasios Piloidis (GRE)

5 March 2015 9	Crvena Zvezda (Serbia)	89–76	(Israel) Maccabi Tel Aviv	Belgrade
20:45	Scoring by quarter: 18–20, 20–14, 16–25, 35–17
	Pts: Marjanović 19; Rebs: Marjanović 17; Asts: Williams 5	Report	Pts: Smith 15; Rebs: Tyus 8 Asts: Ohayon 8	Arena: Kombank Arena; Attendance: 9,926; Referees: Dani Hierrezuelo (ESP), Marcin Kowalski (POL), Benjamin Jimenez (ESP)

12 March 2015 10	Galatasaray (Turkey)	68–91	(Serbia) Crvena Zvezda	Istanbul
19:00	Scoring by quarter: 16–21, 19–31, 16–15, 17–24
	Pts: Pocius 13; Rebs: Young 5 Asts: Carter, Pocius, Nikolov 2	Report	Pts: Blažič 19; Rebs: Marjanović 9 Asts: Jović 8	Arena: Abdi İpekçi Arena; Attendance: 6,231; Referees: Christos Christodoulou (GRE), Juan Carlos Garcia Gonzalez (ESP), Tomas Jasevicius (LTU)

19 March 2015 11	Crvena Zvezda (Serbia)	73–77	(Spain) FC Barcelona	Belgrade
19:15	Scoring by quarter: 15–15, 17–22, 18–11, 23–29
	Pts: Marjanović 23; Rebs: Marjanović 11; Asts: Williams 7	Report	Pts: Navarro 12; Rebs: Satoransky 10; Asts: Satoransky 5	Arena: Kombank Arena; Attendance: 18,450; Referees: Eddie Viator (FRA), Elias Koromilas (GRE), Aare Halliko (EST)

26 March 2015 12	Alba Berlin (Germany)	73–68	(Serbia) Crvena Zvezda	Berlin
20:15	Scoring by quarter: 22–9, 17–13, 20–27, 14–19
	Pts: Banić 18; Rebs: Redding 7 Asts: Redding 11	Report	Pts: Marjanović 27; Rebs: Mitrović, Marjanović 10; Asts: Jović 5	Arena: O2 World; Attendance: 10,867; Referees: Luigi Lamonica (ITA), Ioannis Foufis (GRE), Carlos Peruga (ESP)

3 April 2015 13	Žalgiris (Lithuania)	76–70	(Serbia) Crvena Zvezda	Kaunas
18:45	Scoring by quarter: 12–12, 28–15, 11–28, 25–15
	Pts: Jankūnas 19; Rebs: Jankūnas 9 Asts: Anderson 5	Report	Pts: Marjanović 14; Rebs: Marjanović 12; Asts: Williams 5	Arena: Žalgiris Arena; Attendance: 9,015; Referees: Dani Hierrezuelo (ESP), Emilio Perez Pizarro (ESP), Marcin Kowalski (POL)

9 April 2015 14	Crvena Zvezda (Serbia)	69–68	(Greece) Panathinaikos	Belgrade
20:45	Scoring by quarter: 16–7, 14–19, 14–19, 25–23
	Pts: Kalinić 14; Rebs: Marjanović 16; Asts: Williams 7	Report	Pts: Batista 15; Rebs: Fotsis, Batista 6 Asts: Diamantidis 6	Arena: Pionir Hall; Attendance: 6,156 (Tentative); Referees: Borys Ryzhyk (UKR), Carmelo Paternico (ITA), Olegs Latisevs (LAT)

=== Serbian Super League ===
==== League table ====
Pos	Team	Pld	W	L	PF	PA	PD	Pts	Qualification or relegation
1	Crvena zvezda	14	13	1	1233	995	+238	27	Qualification to playoffs
2	Partizan	14	13	1	1169	975	+194	27	Qualification to playoffs
3	Metalac	14	8	6	1080	1013	+67	22	Qualification to playoffs
4	Mega Leks	14	7	7	1207	1142	+65	21	Qualification to playoffs
5	Vojvodina Srbijagas	14	6	8	1016	1104	−88	20	

Source: Srbijasport.net

==== Results by round ====
Round	1	2	3	4	5	6	7	8	9	10	11	12	13	14
Ground	H	A	H	A	H	A	H	A	H	A	H	A	H	A
Result	W	W	W	W	W	W	W	W	W	W	W	W	W	L
Position	1	2	1	1	1	1	1	1	1	1	1	1	1	1

Source: Competitive matches
Ground: A = Away; H = Home; R = Rest. Result: L = Loss; W = Win; R = Rest; P = Postponed.

Win Loss

==== Matches ====
Source: eurobasket.com

=== Radivoj Korać Cup ===
Win Loss

20 February 2015 Quarterfinals	Crvena zvezda	81–65	Konstantin	Niš
21:00	Scoring by quarter: 32-16, 22-14, 19-15, 8-20
	Pts: Marjanović 15; Rebs: Mitrović 6 Asts: Jović 5	Report	Pts: Ostojić 12; Rebs: Obrenović 7 Asts: Veličković 6	Arena: Čair Sports Center; Attendance: 4,500; Referees: Milan Mazic, Branislav Mrdak, Rados Arsenijevic

21 February 2015 Semifinals	Partizan	67–76	Crvena zvezda	Niš
21:00	Scoring by quarter: 18-26, 16-17, 16-13, 17-20
	Pts: Mačvan 20; Rebs: Murić, Milutinov, Mačvan 5 Asts: Milosavljević 3	Report	Pts: Blažič 15; Rebs: Mitrović 7 Asts: Williams 2	Arena: Čair Sports Center; Attendance: 4,500; Referees: Ilija Belosevic, Milivoje Jovcic, Milija Vojinovic

22 February 2015 Finals	Mega Leks	74–80	Crvena zvezda	Niš
17:00	Scoring by quarter: 21-16, 21-19, 15-24, 17-21
	Pts: Miljenović 21; Rebs: Kešelj 7 Asts: Miljenović, Jokić, Zagorac 2	Report	Pts: Mitrović 21; Rebs: Mitrović 12; Asts: Williams 8	Arena: Čair Sports Center; Attendance: 4,500; Referees: Ilija Belosevic, Milivoje Jovcic, Uros Nikolic

== Individual awards ==
=== EuroLeague ===
MVP of the Week

Round	Player	Efficiency	Ref.
RS-1	(Serbia) Boban Marjanović	30	
RS-7	(Serbia) Boban Marjanović	36	
T16-14	(Serbia) Boban Marjanović	28	

All-Euroleague First Team

Position	Player	Ref.
C	(Serbia) Boban Marjanović	

Individual statistics leaders

- Rating per game: (Serbia) Boban Marjanović (25.67)
- Rebounds per game: (Serbia) Boban Marjanović (10.67)

=== Adriatic League ===
MVP of the Round

Round	Player	Efficiency	Ref.
2	(United States) Marcus Williams	29	
4	(Serbia) Luka Mitrović	34	
14	(Serbia) Nikola Kalinić	32	
SF3	(Serbia) Nikola Kalinić	29	
F1	(Serbia) Boban Marjanović	24	
F2	(Serbia) Boban Marjanović	39	
F3	(Serbia) Boban Marjanović	18	
F4	(United States) Charles Jenkins	19	

MVP of the Month

Month	Player	Ref.
November 2014	(Serbia) Boban Marjanović	

Ideal Starting Five

Position	Player	Ref.
C	(Serbia) Boban Marjanović	

Coach of the season

- (Montenegro) Dejan Radonjić

=== Serbian Super League ===
MVP of the Round

Round	Player	Efficiency	Ref.
5	(Serbia) Boban Marjanović	40	

Super League MVP

- (Serbia) Boban Marjanović

=== Radivoj Korać Cup ===
Finals MVP

- (Serbia) Luka Mitrović

== Statistics ==
Legend
GP	Games played	GS	Games started	MPG	Minutes per game
FG%	Field-goal percentage	3FG%	3-point field-goal percentage	FT%	Free-throw percentage
RPG	Rebounds per game	APG	Assists per game	SPG	Steals per game
BPG	Blocks per game	PPG	Points per game	PIR	PIR per game

*	Led the league
Player	Left during season

=== EuroLeague ===
Player	GP	GS	MPG	2FG%	3FG%	FT%	RPG	APG	SPG	BPG	PPG	PIR
Jaka Blažič	24	10	21.2	.487	.309	.750	2.8	1.0	.5	.1	9.1	5.8
Nemanja Dangubić	23	11	14.1	.412	.342	.684	2.0	.7	.4	.1	4.1	1.9
Charles Jenkins	24	4	19.1	.381	.310	.800	1.3	1.3	.9	.2	6.6	3.7
Stefan Jović	19	1	13.4	.421	.261	.625	2.1	2.8	1.0	.1	2.9	4.8
Nikola Kalinić	24	10	26.0	.470	.355	.627	3.9	2.0	.8	.2	9.2	9.1
Branko Lazić	19	13	17.5	.432	.345	.750	1.5	.7	.6	.1	3.9	2.7
Boban Marjanović	24	24	27.2	.621		.781	10.7	1.0	.4	.9	16.6	25.7
Luka Mitrović	24	20	24.4	.555	.175	.780	5.2	2.3	1.0	.2	8.6	9.7
Nikola Rebić	4	0	1.4					.3				-0.3
Marko Tejić	17	4	8.6	.375	.333	.375	1.4	.7	.1	.1	1.6	0.1
Marcus Williams	24	23	25.5	.345	.292	.755	3.2	6.1	.8		9.7	10.7
Maik Zirbes	24	0	12.6	.630		.688	3.3	.3	.5	.4	5.2	6.2

Source: EuroLeague

== See also ==
- 2014–15 Red Star Belgrade season
- 2014–15 KK Partizan season
