= 2014–15 Euroleague Regular Season Group D =

Standings and Results for Group D of the Regular Season phase of the 2014–15 Euroleague basketball tournament.

== Standings ==
Pos	Team	Pld	W	L	PF	PA	PD	OLY	CZT	LBO	GSL	NEP	VBC
1	(Greece) Olympiacos (A)	10	8	2	748	711	+37		64–59	63–57	93–66	89–79	77–76
2	(Serbia) Crvena Zvezda (A)	10	6	4	784	728	+56	57–62		90–82	76–68	79–62	76–63
3	(Spain) Laboral Kutxa (A)	10	5	5	803	798	+5	89–70	66–86		91–90	88–69	93–89
4	(Turkey) Galatasaray Liv Hospital (A)	10	4 (Note: Tiebreaker: 1–1 (+16))	6	803	818	−15	79–74	110–103	82–89		94–68	71–64
5	(Lithuania) Neptūnas (E)	10	4 (Note: Tiebreaker: 1–1 (–16))	6	763	857	−94	81–85	83–81	80–79	82–72		94–87
6	(Spain) Valencia (E)	10	3	7	775	764	+11	68–71	68–77	79–69	78–71	103–65	

(A) Advance to Top 16; (E) Enter 2014–15 Eurocup Basketball last 32 round

== Fixtures and results ==
All times given below are in Central European Time.

=== Game 1 ===
15 October 2014
20:30

Report

Laboral Kutxa (Spain)	88–69	(Lithuania) Neptūnas
Scoring by quarter: 20–15, 17–15, 24–20, 27–19
Pts: Bertāns 20; Rebs: Gomes, Shengelia 7 Asts: Heurtel 10		Pts: Zavackas 17; Rebs: Zavackas 7 Asts: Shakur 4

Fernando Buesa Arena, Vitoria-Gasteiz
Attendance: 7,689 (Tentative)
Referees: Sreten Radovic (CRO), Elias Koromilas (GRE), Sasa Maricic (SRB)

16 October 2014
20:45

Report

Crvena Zvezda (Serbia)	76–68	(Turkey) Galatasaray
Scoring by quarter: 17–20, 29–10, 17–18, 13–20
Pts: Marjanović 22; Rebs: Marjanović 10; Asts: Williams 7		Pts: Erceg 17; Rebs: Erceg 8 Asts: Arroyo 5

Kombank Arena, Belgrade
Attendance: 16,834 (Tentative)
Referees: Antonio Conde (ESP), Panagiotis Anastopoulos (GRE), Seffi Shemmesh (ISR)

16 October 2014
21:00

Report

Valencia (Spain)	68–71	(Greece) Olympiacos
Scoring by quarter: 18–20, 18–18, 18–18, 14–15
Pts: Harangody 14; Rebs: Sato, Harangody 5 Asts: Van Rossom 4		Pts: Spanoulis 21; Rebs: Petway 8 Asts: Spanoulis, Lafayette 5

Pabellón Fuente San Luis, Valencia
Attendance: 8,500 (Tentative)
Referees: Borys Ryzhyk (UKR), Ilija Belosevic (SRB), Marcin Kowalski (POL)

=== Game 2 ===
23 October 2014
18:00

Report

Neptūnas (Lithuania)	83–81	(Serbia) Crvena Zvezda
Scoring by quarter: 25-20, 22-17, 20-24, 16-20
Pts: Gailius 19; Rebs: Gailius, Galdikas, Zavackas 7 Asts: Shakur 6		Pts: Williams 23; Rebs: Mitrović 10; Asts: Williams 6

Švyturys Arena, Klaipėda
Attendance: 5,309
Referees: Recep Ankarali (TUR), Gianluca Mattioli (ITA), Carlos Peruga (ESP)

23 October 2014
19:00

Report

Galatasaray (Turkey)	71–64	(Spain) Valencia
Scoring by quarter: 25-12, 22-12, 15-26, 9-14
Pts: Arroyo 16; Rebs: Aldemir 12; Asts: Arroyo 5		Pts: Harangody 16; Rebs: Lončar 8 Asts: Van Rossom 7

Abdi İpekçi Arena, Istanbul
Attendance: 6,779
Referees: Sreten Radovic (CRO), Spiros Skontas (GRE), Robert Vyklicky (CZE)

24 October 2014
20:30

Report

Olympiacos (Greece)	63–57	(Spain) Laboral Kutxa
Scoring by quarter: 17-10, 13-16, 18-19, 15-12
Pts: Lojeski 15; Rebs: Hunter, Agravanis 7 Asts: Mantzaris 5		Pts: San Emeterio 14; Rebs: Iverson 7 Asts: Heurtel 5

Peace and Friendship Stadium, Piraeus
Attendance: 6,876
Referees: Sasa Pukl (SLO), Olegs Latisevs (LTU), Marko Juras (SRB)

=== Game 3 ===
30 October 2014
19:00

Report

Crvena Zvezda (Serbia)	76–63	(Spain) Valencia
Scoring by quarter: 21-16, 18-10, 26-16, 11-21
Pts: Marjanović 16; Rebs: Marjanović 9 Asts: Williams 8		Pts: Buycks 14; Rebs: Sato 7 Asts: Vives 3

Kombank Arena, Belgrade
Attendance: 15,820
Referees: Luigi Lamonica (ITA), Boris Shulga (UKR), Sergiy Zashchuk (UKR)

31 October 2014
19:00

Report

Neptūnas (Lithuania)	81–85 (OT)	(Greece) Olympiacos
Scoring by quarter: 15-17, 15-21, 25-17, 21-21, Overtime: 5-9
Pts: Gailius 16; Rebs: Galdikas 11; Asts: Four players 4		Pts: Spanoulis 34; Rebs: Petway 7 Asts: Spanoulis 7

Švyturys Arena, Klaipėda
Attendance: 5,500 (Tentative)
Referees: Jose Ramon Garcia Ortiz (ESP), Petar Obradovic (BIH), Aleksandar Glisic (SRB)

31 October 2014
20:30

Report

Laboral Kutxa (Spain)	91–90	(Turkey) Galatasaray
Scoring by quarter: 23-24, 24-25, 23-21, 21-20
Pts: Iverson, Heurtel 17; Rebs: Iverson 6 Asts: Heurtel 8		Pts: Erceg 24; Rebs: Aldemir 9 Asts: Arroyo 8

Fernando Buesa Arena, Vitoria-Gasteiz
Attendance: 9,287
Referees: Milivoje Jovcic (SRB), Damir Javor (SLO), Ioannis Foufis (GRE)

=== Game 4 ===
7 November 2014
19:00

Report

Crvena Zvezda (Serbia)	57–62	(Greece) Olympiacos
Scoring by quarter: 14-13, 12-24, 10-13, 21-12
Pts: Marjanović 13; Rebs: Marjanović 14; Asts: Williams, Mitrović 4		Pts: Spanoulis 14; Rebs: Agravanis 9 Asts: Sloukas 5

Kombank Arena, Belgrade
Attendance: 18,732
Referees: Dani Hierrezuelo (ESP), Eddie Viator (FRA), Rustu Nuran (TUR)

7 November 2014
20:45

Report

Valencia (Spain)	79–69	(Spain) Laboral Kutxa
Scoring by quarter: 15-22, 23-14, 27-20, 14-13
Pts: Harangody 23; Rebs: Dubljević 7 Asts: Van Rossom 9		Pts: Shengelia 20; Rebs: Vujačić 6 Asts: Heurtel 7

Pabellón Fuente San Luis, Valencia
Attendance: 6,213
Referees: Fernando Rocha (POR), Panagiotis Anastopoulos (GRE), Tomasz Trawicki (POL)

7 November 2014
20:45

Report

Galatasaray (Turkey)	94–68	(Lithuania) Neptūnas
Scoring by quarter: 23-15, 23-17, 31-12, 17-24
Pts: Güler 18; Rebs: Gönlüm 8 Asts: Micov 8		Pts: Girdžiūnas, Gailius 10; Rebs: Dimša, Galdikas 4 Asts: Mažeika, Zavackas 3

Abdi İpekçi Arena, Istanbul
Attendance: 5,002
Referees: Miguel Perez Perez (ESP), Benjamin Jimenez (ESP), Roberto Chiari (ITA)

=== Game 5 ===
13 November 2014
18:00

Report

Neptūnas (Lithuania)	94–87	(Spain) Valencia
Scoring by quarter: 24-17, 29-25, 20-21, 21-24
Pts: Gailius 19; Rebs: Vasylius 5 Asts: Shakur 4		Pts: Ribas 22; Rebs: Four players 4 Asts: Van Rossom 5

Švyturys Arena, Klaipėda
Attendance: 5,395
Referees: Tolga Sahin (ITA), Petri Mantyla (FIN), Aare Halliko (EST)

13 November 2014
20:30

Report

Laboral Kutxa (Spain)	66–86	(Serbia) Crvena Zvezda
Scoring by quarter: 22-21, 12-20, 16-25, 16-20
Pts: Shengelia 20; Rebs: Shengelia 5 Asts: Heurtel 7		Pts: Mitrović 17; Rebs: Kalinić 8 Asts: Williams 6

Fernando Buesa Arena, Vitoria-Gasteiz
Attendance: 8,064
Referees: Spiros Gkontas (GRE), Marek Cmikiewicz (POL), Anastasios Piloidis (GRE)

13 November 2014
20:45

Report

Olympiacos (Greece)	93–66	(Turkey) Galatasaray
Scoring by quarter: 26-13, 23-26, 19-14, 25-13
Pts: Hunter 17; Rebs: Hunter 10; Asts: Spanoulis 7		Pts: Arroyo 14; Rebs: Gönlüm 5 Asts: Four players 2

Peace and Friendship Stadium, Piraeus
Attendance: 7,900
Referees: Fernando Rocha (POR), Marcin Kowalski (POL), Carlos Peruga (ESP)

=== Game 6 ===
20 November 2014
18:00

Report

Neptūnas (Lithuania)	80–79	(Spain) Laboral Kutxa
Scoring by quarter: 20-15, 21-18, 20-21, 19-25
Pts: Shakur, Zavackas 16; Rebs: Galdikas 7 Asts: Mažeika, Gailius 3		Pts: Heurtel 31; Rebs: Iverson, Tillie 8 Asts: Heurtel 5

Švyturys Arena, Klaipėda
Attendance: 5,475
Referees: Borys Ryzhyk (UKR), Srdan Dozai (CRO), Apostolos Kalpakas (SWE)

20 November 2014
18:45

Report

Olympiacos (Greece)	77–76	(Spain) Valencia
Scoring by quarter: 26-21, 19-19, 9-20, 23-16
Pts: Spanoulis 15; Rebs: Agravanis 10; Asts: Spanoulis 7		Pts: Ribas, Lučić, Dubljević 16; Rebs: Ribas 5 Asts: Ribas 6

Peace and Friendship Stadium, Piraeus
Attendance: 8,641
Referees: Robert Lottermoser (GER), Carmelo Paternico (ITA), Saso Petek (SLO)

21 November 2014
19:00

Report

Galatasaray (Turkey)	110–103 (OT)	(Serbia) Crvena Zvezda
Scoring by quarter: 22-16, 23-24, 9-23, 28-19, Overtime: 1414 2OT = 14 7
Pts: Erceg 32; Rebs: Güler 8 Asts: Arroyo, Arslan 6		Pts: Mitrovic 30; Rebs: Marjanovic 17; Asts: Williams 17

Abdi İpekçi Arena, Istanbul
Attendance: 8,582
Referees: Paolo Taurino (ITA), Tomas Jasevicius (LTU), Aare Halliko (EST)

=== Game 7 ===
27 November 2014
19:00

Report

Crvena Zvezda (Serbia)	79–62	(Lithuania) Neptūnas
Scoring by quarter: 22-14, 13-23, 27-10, 17-15
Pts: Marjanović 24; Rebs: Marjanović 12; Asts: Williams 7		Pts: Gailius 18; Rebs: Benson, Zavackas 7 Asts: Gailius 6

Kombank Arena, Belgrade
Attendance: 12,547
Referees: Vicente Bulto (ESP), Elias Koromilas (GRE), Piotr Pastusiak (POL)

27 November 2014
20:45

Report

Laboral Kutxa (Spain)	89–70	(Greece) Olympiacos
Scoring by quarter: 24-17, 20-20, 24-15, 21-18
Pts: Heurtel 18; Rebs: Begić 7 Asts: Heurtel 4		Pts: Spanoulis 27; Rebs: Dunston 6 Asts: Spanoulis 3

Fernando Buesa Arena, Vitoria-Gasteiz
Attendance: 10,121
Referees: Tolga Sahin (ITA), Jakub Zamojski (POL), Boris Shulga (UKR)

28 November 2014
21:00

Report

Valencia (Spain)	78–71	(Turkey) Galatasaray
Scoring by quarter: 27-17, 13-13, 17-16, 21-25
Pts: Lončar 15; Rebs: Harangody 8 Asts: Ribas, Vives 5		Pts: Aradori 20; Rebs: Gönlüm, Aradori 8 Asts: Aradori 6

Pabellón Fuente San Luis, Valencia
Attendance: 5,964
Referees: Sasa Pukl (SLO), Olegs Latisevs (LAT), Nicola Maestre (FRA)

=== Game 8 ===
5 December 2014
20:15

Report

Galatasaray (Turkey)	82–89	(Spain) Laboral Kutxa
Scoring by quarter: 19-19, 19-20, 27-28, 17-22
Pts: Arroyo 22; Rebs: Gönlüm 8 Asts: Güler 4		Pts: San Emeterio 25; Rebs: Tillie 10; Asts: Heurtel 9

Abdi İpekçi Arena, Istanbul
Attendance: 8,168
Referees: Matej Boltauzer (SLO), Grzegorz Ziemblicki (POL), Clements Fritz (GER)

5 December 2014
20:45

Report

Olympiacos (Greece)	89–79	(Lithuania) Neptūnas
Scoring by quarter: 24-19, 23-17, 22-17, 20-26
Pts: Petway 20; Rebs: Hunter 6 Asts: Spanoulis 9		Pts: Zavackas 15; Rebs: Benson 8 Asts: Shakur, Zavackas 3

Peace and Friendship Stadium, Piraeus
Attendance: 6,039
Referees: Recep Ankarali (TUR), Paolo Taurino (ITA), Zdravko Rutesic (MNE)

5 December 2014
21:00

Report

Valencia (Spain)	68–77	(Serbia) Crvena Zvezda
Scoring by quarter: 16-20, 21-22, 15-20, 16-15
Pts: Dubljević 22; Rebs: Lučić 6 Asts: Ribas 6		Pts: Marjanović 18; Rebs: Marjanović 11; Asts: Mitrović 6

Pabellón Fuente San Luis, Valencia
Attendance: 6,387
Referees: Roberto Chiari (ITA), Jakub Zamojski (POL), Joseph Bissang (FRA)

=== Game 9 ===
10 December 2014
18:00

Report

Neptūnas (Lithuania)	82–72	(Turkey) Galatasaray
Scoring by quarter: 22-18, 18-19, 23-23, 19-12
Pts: Gailius 23; Rebs: Gailius 8 Asts: Mažeika, Girdžiūnas, Shakur 3		Pts: Erceg 24; Rebs: Young 8 Asts: Arroyo 5

Švyturys Arena, Klaipėda
Attendance: 5,669
Referees: Dani Hierrezuelo (ESP), Panagiotis Anastopoulos (GRE), Milos Koljensic (MNE)

12 December 2014
20:30

Report

Olympiacos (Greece)	64–59	(Serbia) Crvena Zvezda
Scoring by quarter: 13-16, 14-12, 15-20, 22-11
Pts: Spanoulis 15; Rebs: Petway 7 Asts: Sloukas 5		Pts: Marjanović 17; Rebs: Marjanović 13; Asts: Williams, Jović 4

Peace and Friendship Stadium, Piraeus
Attendance: 11,573
Referees: Borys Ryzhyk (UKR), Piotr Pastusiak (POL), David Romano (ISR)

12 December 2014
20:45

Report

Laboral Kutxa (Spain)	93–89	(Spain) Valencia
Scoring by quarter: 28-24, 23-23, 18-15, 24-27
Pts: Causeur 21; Rebs: Iverson 11; Asts: Heurtel 4		Pts: Nedović 17; Rebs: Dubljević 5 Asts: Nedović 4

Fernando Buesa Arena, Vitoria-Gasteiz
Attendance: 9,862
Referees: Christos Christodoulou (GRE), Eddie Viator (FRA), Rustu Nuran (TUR)

=== Game 10 ===
18 December 2014
19:00

Report

Valencia (Spain)	103–65	(Lithuania) Neptūnas
Scoring by quarter: 28-17, 24-14, 23-18, 28-16
Pts: Harangody 20; Rebs: Sato 10; Asts: Vives 6		Pts: Gailius 15; Rebs: Gailius, Galdikas 6 Asts: Shakur 7

Pabellón Fuente San Luis, Valencia
Attendance: 3,005
Referees: Robert Lottermoser (GER), Spiros Gkontas (GRE), Apostolos Kalpakas (SWE)

18 December 2014
19:00

Report

Galatasaray (Turkey)	79–74	(Greece) Olympiacos
Scoring by quarter: 20-18, 16-20, 21-12, 22-24
Pts: Arroyo 24; Rebs: Young 13; Asts: Güler 5		Pts: Lojeski 22; Rebs: Petway 7 Asts: Spanoulis 5

Abdi İpekçi Arena, Istanbul
Attendance: 0
Referees: Antonio Conde (ESP), Carmelo Paternico (ITA), Benjamin Jimenez (ESP)

19 December 2014
19:00

Report

Crvena Zvezda (Serbia)	90–82	(Spain) Laboral Kutxa
Scoring by quarter: 18-18, 28-27, 24-18, 20-19
Pts: Williams 23; Rebs: Marjanović 12; Asts: Williams 8		Pts: Bertāns 16; Rebs: Tillie 7 Asts: Heurtel 7

Pionir Hall, Belgrade
Attendance: 0
Referees: Luigi Lamonica (ITA), Paolo Taurino (ITA), Sergiy Zashchuk (UKR)

== Statistics ==
	(Serbia) Crvena zvezda	(Turkey) Galatasaray	(Spain) Laboral Kutxa	(Lithuania) Neptūnas Klaipėda	(Greece) Olympiacos	(Spain) Valencia
PPG	(Serbia) Boban Marjanović (16.8)	(Serbia) Zoran Erceg (18.1)	(France) Thomas Heurtel (12.2)	(Lithuania) Deividas Gailius (14.7)	(Greece) Vassilis Spanoulis (17.5)	(Montenegro) Bojan Dubljević (15.5)
RPG	(Serbia) Boban Marjanović (10.7)	(Turkey) Furkan Aldemir (6.2)	(United States) Colton Iverson (6.0)	(Lithuania) Donatas Zavackas (5.2)	(United States) Bryant Dunston (5.0)	(United States) Luke Harangody & (Central African Republic) Romain Sato (4.8)
APG	(United States) Marcus Williams (6.9)	(Puerto Rico) Carlos Arroyo (4.3)	(France) Thomas Heurtel (6.7)	(United States) Mustafa Shakur (3.8)	(Greece) Vassilis Spanoulis (5.2)	(Belgium) Sam Van Rossom (5.0)
