= Nikola Čvorović =

Serbian basketball player

CB Marbella
- Position: Forward
- League: LEB Plata

Personal information
- Born: 30 January 1994 (age 32) Novi Sad, Serbia, FR Yugoslavia
- Listed height: 2.01 m (6 ft 7 in)
- Listed weight: 95 kg (209 lb)

Career information
- NBA draft: 2016: undrafted
- Playing career: 2010–present

Career history
- 2010–2011, 2012–2015: Crvena zvezda
- 2012–2013: →Radnički FMP
- 2013–2014, 2015: →FMP
- 2015: Vršac
- 2015–2015: Mladost SP
- 2016: Sarno
- 2016–2017: Mladost SP
- 2017–2018: Novi Pazar
- 2018–2019: Zdravlje
- 2019–2020: Kolubara LA 2003
- 2021–present: Marbella

Career highlights
- ABA League champion (2015); Serbian Cup winner (2015)
Medals
Men's basketball
Representing Serbia
U18 European Championship
Bronze medal – third place	2012 Lithuania/Latvia	U18 Team

Nikola Čvorović (Serbian Cyrillic: Никола Чворовић, born 30 January 1994) is a Serbian professional basketball player who plays for CB Marbella in the Spanish LEB Plata.

== Playing career ==
On October 23, 2010, Čvorović made his ABA League debut. In February 2012, Čvorović signed a four-year contract for Crvena zvezda. He spent the 2014–15 season with Crvena zvezda without playing any game. In April 2015, he is loaned to FMP for the rest of the season. In August 2015, he was waived by Zvezda.
