= 2014–15 Euroleague Top 16 Group E =

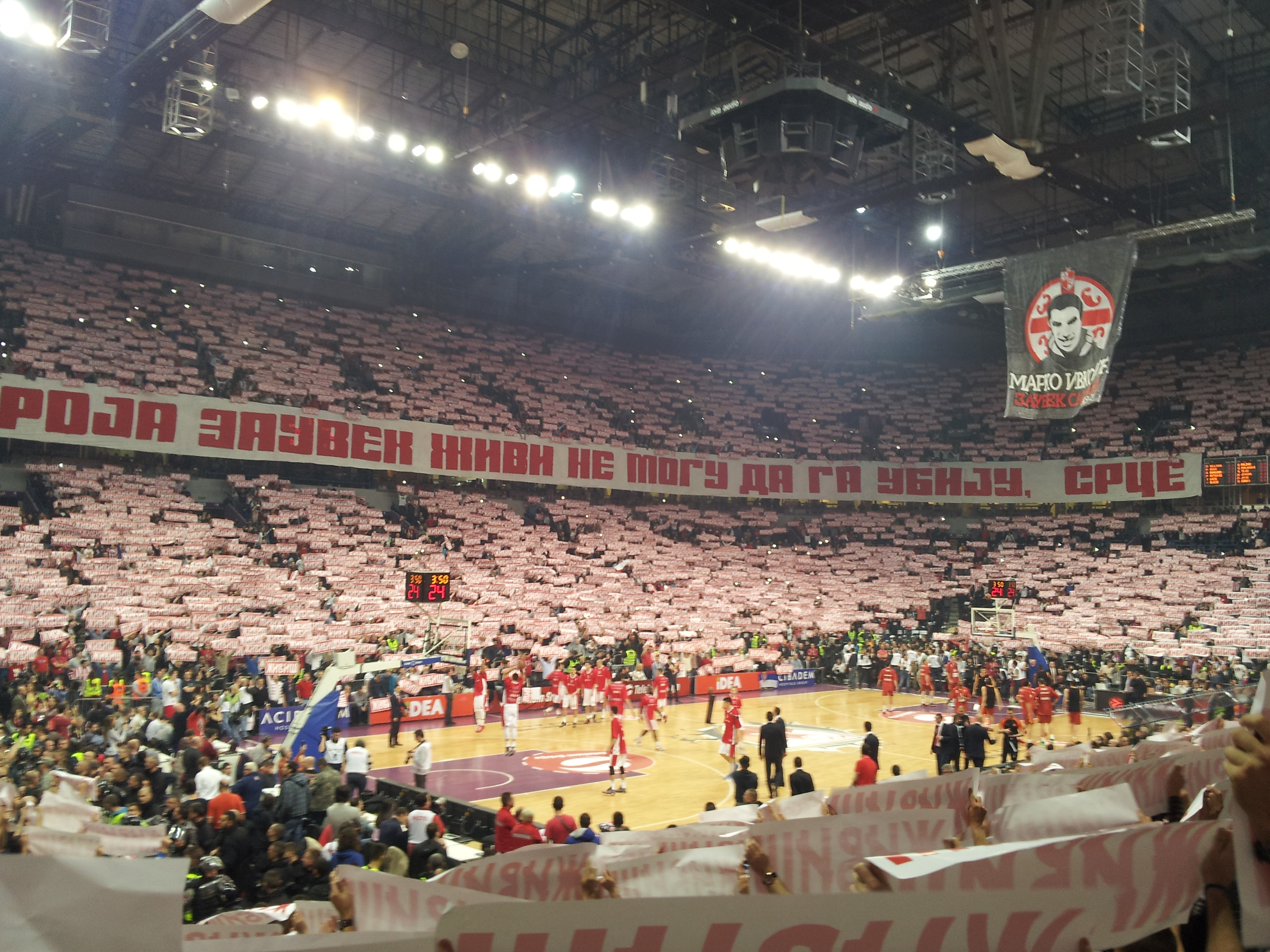
Played only two months following the previous contest between the two teams in Istanbul when Crvena zvezda's fan Marko Ivković got stabbed to death by a Galatasaray fan outside the Abdi İpekçi Arena, the Crvena zvezda vs. Galatasaray game in Belgrade's Kombank Arena in January 2015 featured a great deal of tension.

== Standings ==
| Pos | Team | Pld | W | L | PF | PA | PD | RMD | FCB | MTA | PAN | ALB | ŽAL | CZT | GSL |
|---|---|---|---|---|---|---|---|---|---|---|---|---|---|---|---|
| 1 | (Spain) Real Madrid (A) | 14 | 11 (Note: Tiebreaker: 1–1 (+19)) | 3 | 1224 | 1032 | +192 | | 97–73 | 86–75 | 83–65 | 93–62 | 99–83 | 85–61 | 93–78 |
| 2 | (Spain) FC Barcelona (A) | 14 | 11 (Note: Tiebreaker: 1–1 (–19)) | 3 | 1149 | 1062 | +87 | 85–80 | | 89–71 | 80–76 | 92–82 | 89–72 | 92–77 | 82–70 |
| 3 | (Israel) Maccabi Tel Aviv (A) | 14 | 9 | 5 | 1071 | 1072 | −1 | 90–86 | 70–68 | | 73–70 | 59–66 | 79–72 | 78–67 | 81–72 |
| 4 | (Greece) Panathinaikos (A) | 14 | 7 (Note: Tiebreaker: 1–1 (+4)) | 7 | 1048 | 1022 | +26 | 85–69 | 77–81 | 83–76 | | 66–68 | 77–58 | 74–69 | 86–77 |
| 5 | (Germany) Alba Berlin (E) | 14 | 7 (Note: Tiebreaker: 1–1 (–4)) | 7 | 976 | 1031 | −55 | 61–79 | 80–70 | 64–73 | 59–65 | | 80–72 | 73–68 | 75–68 |
| 6 | (Lithuania) Žalgiris (E) | 14 | 5 | 9 | 1004 | 1075 | −71 | 71–88 | 72–83 | 66–73 | 76–70 | 75–62 | | 76–70 | 72–59 |
| 7 | (Serbia) Crvena Zvezda (E) | 14 | 4 | 10 | 1025 | 1059 | −34 | 72–79 | 73–77 | 89–76 | 69–68 | 86–69 | 68–70 | | 65–74 |
| 8 | (Turkey) Galatasaray (E) | 14 | 2 | 12 | 1023 | 1167 | −144 | 71–107 | 65–88 | 94–97 | 84–86 | 65–75 | 78–69 | 68–91 | |

(A) Advance to Playoffs; (E) Eliminated

== Fixtures and results ==
All times given below are in Central European Time.

=== Game 1 ===
30 December 2014
19:00

Report

| Galatasaray (Turkey) | 78–69 | (Lithuania) Žalgiris |
Scoring by quarter: 20–22, 15–19, 22–14, 21–14
| Pts: Erceg, Güler 14; Rebs: Carter, Güler 7 Asts: Arroyo 5 | | Pts: Anderson 15; Rebs: Kariniauskas, Javtokas 6 Asts: Kariniauskas 4 |

Abdi İpekçi Arena, Istanbul
Attendance: 0
Referees: Borys Ryzhyk (UKR), Eddie Viator (FRA), Marek Cmikiewicz (POL)

30 December 2014
21:00

Report

| Panathinaikos (Greece) | 83–76 | (Israel) Maccabi Tel Aviv |
Scoring by quarter: 15–19, 24–24, 21–21, 23–12
| Pts: Batista 16; Rebs: Mavrokefalidis, Gist, Batista 6 Asts: Diamantidis 7 | | Pts: Randle, Linhart 18; Rebs: Tyus 11; Asts: Pargo 9 |

O.A.C.A., Athens
Attendance: 11,561
Referees: Ilija Belosevic (SRB), Recep Ankarali (TUR), Olegs Latisevs (LAT)

2 January 2015
19:00

Report

| Crvena Zvezda (Serbia) | 72–79 | (Spain) Real Madrid |
Scoring by quarter: 12–15, 19–19, 14–24, 27–21
| Pts: Mitrović, Zirbes 13; Rebs: Marjanović 7 Asts: Jović 9 | | Pts: Fernández 15; Rebs: Fernández 6 Asts: Llull 9 |

Kombank Arena, Belgrade
Attendance: 18,733
Referees: Christos Christodoulou (GRE), Spiros Gkontas (GRE), Nicola Maestre (FRA)

2 January 2015
20:00

Report

| Alba Berlin (Germany) | 80–70 | (Spain) FC Barcelona |
Scoring by quarter: 16–23, 23–17, 22–8, 19–22
| Pts: Redding, McLean, Radošević 16; Rebs: Redding, McLean 8 Asts: Renfroe, Hammonds 4 | | Pts: Huertas 23; Rebs: Tomić 10; Asts: Huertas 7 |

O2 World, Berlin
Attendance: 9,379
Referees: Paolo Taurino (ITA), Panagiotis Anastopoulos (GRE), Joseph Bissang (FRA)

=== Game 2 ===
8 January 2015
20:05

Report

| Maccabi Tel Aviv (Israel) | 78–67 | (Serbia) Crvena Zvezda |
Scoring by quarter: 21–18, 16–15, 19–16, 22–18
| Pts: Randle 16; Rebs: Smith 10; Asts: Ohayon 8 | | Pts: Kalinić 18; Rebs: Blažič, Marjanović 8 Asts: Williams 9 |

Menora Mivtachim Arena, Tel Aviv
Attendance: 10,728
Referees: Juan Carlos Garcia Gonzalez (ESP), Antonio Conde (ESP), Petros Papapetrou (GRE)

8 January 2015
20:45

Report

| Real Madrid (Spain) | 93–78 | (Turkey) Galatasaray |
Scoring by quarter: 25–24, 30–15, 14–18, 24–21
| Pts: Reyes 22; Rebs: Reyes 11; Asts: Llull 7 | | Pts: Erceg 17; Rebs: Erceg 5 Asts: Arroyo 6 |

Palacio de Deportes de la Comunidad de Madrid, Madrid
Attendance: 7,806
Referees: Sreten Radovic (CRO), Boris Shulga (UKR), Ioannis Foufis (GRE)

9 January 2015
18:45

Report

| Žalgiris (Lithuania) | 75–62 | (Germany) Alba Berlin |
Scoring by quarter: 18–15, 17–13, 18–18, 22–16
| Pts: Anderson 16; Rebs: Jankūnas, Anderson 6 Asts: Cherry, Jankūnas 4 | | Pts: McLean 16; Rebs: Renfroe 7 Asts: Hammonds 6 |

Žalgiris Arena, Kaunas
Attendance: 9,317
Referees: Miguel Perez Perez (ESP), Tolga Sahin (ITA), Emilio Perez Pizarro (ESP)

9 January 2015
20:45

Report

| FC Barcelona (Spain) | 80–76 | (Greece) Panathinaikos |
Scoring by quarter: 14–20, 23–17, 26–19, 17–20
| Pts: Huertas 22; Rebs: Doellman, Thomas, Tomić 6 Asts: Huertas 5 | | Pts: Nelson 16; Rebs: Batista 12; Asts: Diamantidis 4 |

Palau Blaugrana, Barcelona
Attendance: 5,162
Referees: Luigi Lamonica (ITA), Milivoje Jovcic (SRB), Tomas Jasevicius (ESP)

=== Game 3 ===
15 January 2015
20:15

Boxscore

| Alba Berlin (Germany) | 61–79 | (Spain) Real Madrid |
Scoring by quarter: 15–16, 19–20, 10–19, 17–24
| Pts: Renfroe 13; Rebs: McLean 5 Asts: Redding 4 | | Pts: Llull 13; Rebs: Ayón, Reyes 6 Asts: Rodríguez 7 |

O2 World, Berlin
Attendance: 9,317
Referees: Recep Ankarali (TUR), Matej Boltauzer (SLO), Tomasz Trawicki (POL)

15 January 2015
20:45

Boxscore

| Maccabi Tel Aviv (Israel) | 70–68 | (Spain) FC Barcelona |
Scoring by quarter: 15–13, 21–15, 17–19, 17–21
| Pts: Pargo 20; Rebs: Schortsanitis 9 Asts: Pargo 7 | | Pts: Tomić 21; Rebs: Tomić 10; Asts: Huertas 7 |

Menora Mivtachim Arena, Tel Aviv
Attendance: 10,728
Referees: Robert Lottermoser (GER), Spiros Gontas (GRE), Milos Koljensic (MNE)

16 January 2015
20:45

Boxscore

| Crvena Zvezda (Serbia) | 65–74 | (Turkey) Galatasaray |
Scoring by quarter: 19–21, 16–12, 12–18, 18–23
| Pts: Marjanović 18; Rebs: Marjanović, Zirbes 7 Asts: Williams 4 | | Pts: Micov 12; Rebs: Marić 7 Asts: Arroyo, Micov 3 |

Kombank Arena, Belgrade
Attendance: 17,821
Referees: Dani Hierrenzuelo (ESP), Olegs Latisevs (LAT), Piotr Pastusiak (POL)

16 January 2015
20:45

Boxscore

| Panathinaikos (Greece) | 77–58 | (Lithuania) Žalgiris |
Scoring by quarter: 24–16, 22–17, 17–9, 14–16
| Pts: Pappas 14; Rebs: Batista 9 Asts: Diamantidis 6 | | Pts: Cherry 13; Rebs: Jankūnas 7 Asts: Lekavičius 3 |

O.A.C.A., Athens
Attendance: 8,522
Referees: Vicente Bulto (ESP), Damir Javor (SLO), Benjamin Jimenez (ESP)

=== Game 4 ===
22 January 2015
19:00

Report

| Galatasaray (Turkey) | 65–75 | (Germany) Alba Berlin |
Scoring by quarter: 19–18, 14–13, 15–21, 17–23
| Pts: Erceg 19; Rebs: Young 6 Asts: Carter 5 | | Pts: Redding 16; Rebs: McLean 7 Asts: Renfroe 9 |

Abdi İpekçi Arena, Istanbul
Attendance: 0
Referees: Fernando Rocha (POR), Antonio Conde (ESP), Carlos Cortes (ESP)

22 January 2015
20:45

Report

| Real Madrid (Spain) | 83–65 | (Greece) Panathinaikos |
Scoring by quarter: 20–14, 19–15, 21–19, 23–17
| Pts: Reyes 18; Rebs: Reyes 9 Asts: Rodríguez 7 | | Pts: Batista 15; Rebs: Batista 9 Asts: Diamantidis 7 |

Palacio de Deportes de la Comunidad de Madrid, Madrid
Attendance: 11,382
Referees: Robert Lottermoser (GER), Eddie Viator (FRA), Carmelo Paternico (ITA)

23 January 2015
18:45

Report

| Žalgiris (Lithuania) | 66–73 | (Israel) Maccabi Tel Aviv |
Scoring by quarter: 22–22, 15–18, 15–8, 14–25
| Pts: Jankūnas 18; Rebs: Jankūnas 13; Asts: Lekavičius 3 | | Pts: Landesberg 20; Rebs: Smith, Ohayon 6 Asts: Pargo 8 |

Žalgiris Arena, Kaunas
Attendance: 13,145
Referees: Sasa Pukl (SLO), Srdan Dozai (CRO), Elias Koromilas (GRE)

23 January 2015
20:45

Report

| FC Barcelona (Spain) | 92–77 | (Serbia) Crvena Zvezda |
Scoring by quarter: 27–21, 22–17, 21–21, 22–18
| Pts: Abrines 15; Rebs: Tomić 10; Asts: Huertas 7 | | Pts: Blažič 13; Rebs: Marjanović 7 Asts: Williams, Jović 3 |

Palau Blaugrana, Barcelona
Attendance: 7,340
Referees: Borys Ryzhyk (UKR), Roberto Chiari (ITA), Ioannis Foufis (GRE)

=== Game 5 ===
29 January 2015
20:05

Report

| Maccabi Tel Aviv (Israel) | 90–86 | (Spain) Real Madrid |
Scoring by quarter: 23–31, 23–23, 22–15, 22–17
| Pts: Haynes, Schortsanitis 17; Rebs: Schortsanitis 8 Asts: Pargo 9 | | Pts: Reyes 20; Rebs: Reyes 11; Asts: Rodríguez 8 |

Menora Mivtachim Arena, Tel Aviv
Attendance: 10,728
Referees: Borys Ryzhyk (UKR), Fernando Rocha (POR), Panagiotis Anastopoulos (GRE)

29 January 2015
20:45

Report

| Crvena Zvezda (Serbia) | 86–69 | (Germany) Alba Berlin |
Scoring by quarter: 22–12, 25–17, 17–18, 22–22
| Pts: Marjanović 17; Rebs: Marjanović 12; Asts: Williams 10 | | Pts: McLean 14; Rebs: Renfroe 8 Asts: Renfroe 4 |

Pionir Hall, Belgrade
Attendance: 5,908
Referees: Luigi Lamonica (ITA), Elias Koromilas (GRE), Boris Shulga (UKR)

30 January 2015
20:45

Report

| Panathinaikos (Greece) | 86–77 | (Turkey) Galatasaray |
Scoring by quarter: 19–11, 23–16, 23–19, 21–31
| Pts: Blūms 16; Rebs: Fotsis 11; Asts: Nelson 8 | | Pts: Micov 16; Rebs: Young 8 Asts: Arroyo 6 |

O.A.C.A., Athens
Attendance: 9,288
Referees: Ilija Belosevic (SRB), Paolo Taurino (ITA), Carlos Peruga (ESP)

30 January 2015
20:45

Report

| FC Barcelona (Spain) | 89–72 | (Lithuania) Žalgiris |
Scoring by quarter: 29–13, 22–20, 16–20, 22–19
| Pts: Tomić 16; Rebs: Tomić 9 Asts: Huertas, Jackson, Tomić 5 | | Pts: Gudaitis 17; Rebs: Gudaitis, Songaila, Jankūnas 5 Asts: Dimša 4 |

Palau Blaugrana, Barcelona
Attendance: 6,762
Referees: Grzegorz Ziemblicki (POL), Joseph Bissang (FRA), Petros Papapetrou (GRE)

=== Game 6 ===
5 February 2015
19:00

Report

| Galatasaray (Turkey) | 94–97 (OT) | (Israel) Maccabi Tel Aviv |
Scoring by quarter: 22–27, 22–22, 19–15, 22–21, Overtime: 9–12
| Pts: Erceg 29; Rebs: Carter 8 Asts: Güler 4 | | Pts: Smith 24; Rebs: Tyus 8 Asts: Ohayon 6 |

Abdi İpekçi Arena, Istanbul
Attendance: 11,300
Referees: Luigi Lamonica (ITA), Milivoje Jovcic (SRB), Anastasios Piloidis (GRE)

5 February 2015
20:45

Report

| Crvena Zvezda (Serbia) | 68–70 | (Lithuania) Žalgiris |
Scoring by quarter: 13–20, 21–19, 15–14, 19–17
| Pts: Marjanović 17; Rebs: Marjanović 10; Asts: Williams 7 | | Pts: Anderson 22; Rebs: Jankūnas 8 Asts: Lekavičius, Milaknis 3 |

Kombank Arena, Belgrade
Attendance: 18,382
Referees: Juan Carlos Garcia Gonzalez (ESP), Spiros Gkontas (GRE), Carlos Cortes (ESP)

5 February 2015
20:45

Report

| Real Madrid (Spain) | 97–73 | (Spain) FC Barcelona |
Scoring by quarter: 26–16, 16–17, 24–20, 31–20
| Pts: Rodríguez 23; Rebs: Fernández 9 Asts: Rodríguez 6 | | Pts: Hezonja 22; Rebs: Tomić 6 Asts: Abrines 4 |

Palacio de Deportes de la Comunidad de Madrid, Madrid
Attendance: 12,662
Referees: Christos Christodoulou (GRE), Ilija Belosevic (SRB), Tolga Sahin (ITA)

6 February 2015
20:00

Report

| Alba Berlin (Germany) | 59–65 | (Greece) Panathinaikos |
Scoring by quarter: 13–13, 16–9, 16–23, 14–20
| Pts: McLean, Redding 11; Rebs: Redding 6 Asts: Redding 4 | | Pts: Mavrokefalidis 11; Rebs: Fotsis 8 Asts: Diamantidis, Gist 3 |

O2 World, Berlin
Attendance: 11,406
Referees: Miguel Perez Perez (ESP), Roberto Chiari (ITA), Rustu Nuran (TUR)

=== Game 7 ===
12 February 2015
18:45

Report

| Žalgiris (Lithuania) | 71–88 | (Spain) Real Madrid |
Scoring by quarter: 23–24, 24–23, 13–25, 11–16
| Pts: Javtokas 12; Rebs: Gudaitis, Javtokas 6 Asts: Lekavičius, Songaila 4 | | Pts: Fernández 17; Rebs: Nocioni 6 Asts: Lull 9 |

Žalgiris Arena, Kaunas
Attendance: 12,368
Referees: Luigi Lamonica (ITA), Rustu Nuran (TUR), Piotr Pastusiak (POL)

12 February 2015
20:05

Report

| Maccabi Tel Aviv (Israel) | 59–66 | (Germany) Alba Berlin |
Scoring by quarter: 16–15, 20–20, 8–15, 15–16
| Pts: Smith 17; Rebs: Smith 9 Asts: Smith 4 | | Pts: McLean 18; Rebs: McLean, Redding 6 Asts: Tabu 7 |

Menora Mivtachim Arena, Tel Aviv
Attendance: 10,728
Referees: Christos Christodoulou (GRE), Recep Ankarali (TUR), Carlos Peruga (ESP)

12 February 2015
20:45

Report

| FC Barcelona (Spain) | 82–70 | (Turkey) Galatasaray |
Scoring by quarter: 22–20, 30–19, 14–17, 16–14
| Pts: Satoransky 17; Rebs: Doellman, Tomić 9 Asts: Tomić 5 | | Pts: Erceg 18; Rebs: Young 14; Asts: Arslan 6 |

Palau Blaugrana, Barcelona
Attendance: 7,066
Referees: Robert Lottermoser (GER), Eddie Viator (FRA), Aare Halliko (EST)

13 February 2015
20:45

Report

| Panathinaikos (Greece) | 74–69 | (Serbia) Crvena Zvezda |
Scoring by quarter: 26–6, 11–23, 15–22, 22–18
| Pts: Slaughter 16; Rebs: Fotsis, Gist 5 Asts: Diamantidis 10 | | Pts: Jenkins, Marjanović 17; Rebs: Marjanović 10; Asts: Kalinić 4 |

O.A.C.A., Athens
Attendance: 10,101
Referees: Vicente Bulto (ESP), Tolga Sahin (ITA), Sergiy Zashchuk (UKR)

=== Game 8 ===
26 February 2015
18:45

Report

| Žalgiris (Lithuania) | 72–59 | (Turkey) Galatasaray |
Scoring by quarter: 23–8, 19–16, 12–19, 18–16
| Pts: Jankūnas 12; Rebs: Jankūnas 9 Asts: Anderson 6 | | Pts: Güler 16; Rebs: Gönlüm 10; Asts: Carter 3 |

Žalgiris Arena, Kaunas
Attendance: 8,700
Referees: Dani Hierrenzuelo (ESP), Sreten Radovic (CRO), Ioannis Foufis (GRE)

26 February 2015
20:05

Report

| Maccabi Tel Aviv (Israel) | 73–70 | (Greece) Panathinaikos |
Scoring by quarter: 22–17, 16–13, 16–22, 19–18
| Pts: Pargo 16; Rebs: Linhart 10; Asts: Haynes, Randle 5 | | Pts: Janković 16; Rebs: Batista 6 Asts: Diamantidis 6 |

Menora Mivtachim Arena, Tel Aviv
Attendance: 10,728
Referees: Sasa Pukl (SLO), Juan Carlos Garcia Gonzalez (ESP), Matej Boltauzer (SLO)

26 February 2015
20:45

Report

| Real Madrid (Spain) | 85–61 | (Serbia) Crvena Zvezda |
Scoring by quarter: 16–18, 24–11, 20–17, 25–15
| Pts: Carroll 17; Rebs: Reyes, Slaughter 5 Asts: Llull 7 | | Pts: Marjanović 21; Rebs: Marjanović 13; Asts: Williams 8 |

Palacio de Deportes de la Comunidad de Madrid, Madrid
Attendance: 11,385
Referees: Robert Lottermoser (GER), Roberto Chiari (ITA), Anastasios Piloidis (GRE)

27 February 2015
20:45

Report

| FC Barcelona (Spain) | 92–82 (OT) | (Germany) Alba Berlin |
Scoring by quarter: 13–14, 27–18, 19–14, 18–31, Overtime: 15–5
| Pts: Doellman 17; Rebs: Tomić 5 Asts: Satoransky 8 | | Pts: Redding, Renfroe 20; Rebs: Radošević 7 Asts: Renfroe 7 |

Palau Blaugrana, Barcelona
Attendance: 7,634
Referees: Fernando Rocha (POR), Panagiotis Anastopoulos (GRE), Marcin Kowalski (POL)

=== Game 9 ===
4 March 2015
20:15

Report

| Alba Berlin (Germany) | 80–72 | (Lithuania) Žalgiris |
Scoring by quarter: 20–17, 22–20, 20–14, 18–21
| Pts: Redding 27; Rebs: Redding, Renfroe 7 Asts: Renfroe 8 | | Pts: Milaknis 18; Rebs: Songaila 4 Asts: Lekavičius 4 |

O2 World, Berlin
Attendance: 9,088
Referees: Milivoje Jovcic (SRB), Antonio Conde (ESP), Damir Javor (SLO)

5 March 2015
20:45

Report

| Crvena Zvezda (Serbia) | 89–76 | (Israel) Maccabi Tel Aviv |
Scoring by quarter: 18–20, 20–14, 16–25, 35–17
| Pts: Marjanović 19; Rebs: Marjanović 17; Asts: Williams 5 | | Pts: Smith 15; Rebs: Tyus 8 Asts: Ohayon 8 |

Kombank Arena, Belgrade
Attendance: 9,926
Referees: Dani Hierrezuelo (ESP), Marcin Kowalski (POL), Benjamin Jimenez (ESP)

5 March 2015
20:45

Report

| Panathinaikos (Greece) | 77–81 | (Spain) FC Barcelona |
Scoring by quarter: 21–16, 11–26, 20–15, 25–24
| Pts: Batista 16; Rebs: Batista 9 Asts: Diamantidis 6 | | Pts: Doellman 21; Rebs: Doellman, Tomić 7 Asts: Satoranský 6 |

O.A.C.A., Athens
Attendance: 16,033
Referees: Luigi Lamonica (ITA), Carmelo Paternico (ITA), Milos Koljensic (MNE)

6 March 2015
19:00

Report

| Galatasaray (Turkey) | 71–107 | (Spain) Real Madrid |
Scoring by quarter: 20–24, 14–33, 25–20, 12–30
| Pts: Young 19; Rebs: Young 8 Asts: Carter, Arslan 3 | | Pts: Fernández 17; Rebs: Bourousis 5 Asts: Rodríguez, Llull 7 |

Abdi İpekçi Arena, Istanbul
Attendance: 11,312
Referees: Sasa Pukl (SLO), Jakub Zamojski (POL), Elias Koromilas (GRE)

=== Game 10 ===
12 March 2015
19:00

Report

| Galatasaray (Turkey) | 68–91 | (Serbia) Crvena Zvezda |
Scoring by quarter: 16–21, 19–31, 16–15, 17–24
| Pts: Pocius 13; Rebs: Young 5 Asts: Carter, Pocius, Nikolov 2 | | Pts: Blažič 19; Rebs: Marjanović 9 Asts: Jović 8 |

Abdi İpekçi Arena, Istanbul
Attendance: 6,231
Referees: Christos Christodoulou (GRE), Juan Carlos Garcia Gonzalez (ESP), Tomas Jasevicius (LTU)

12 March 2015
20:45

Report

| FC Barcelona (Spain) | 89–71 | (Israel) Maccabi Tel Aviv |
Scoring by quarter: 26–16, 21–18, 17–19, 25–18
| Pts: Tomić 16; Rebs: Tomić 12; Asts: Tomić 6 | | Pts: Alexander 16; Rebs: Smith, Randle 4 Asts: Smith 3 |

Palau Blaugrana, Barcelona
Attendance: 7,729
Referees: Ilija Belosevic (SRB), Tolga Sahin (ITA), Boris Shulga (UKR)

12 March 2015
21:00

Report

| Real Madrid (Spain) | 93–62 | (Germany) Alba Berlin |
Scoring by quarter: 27–18, 19–21, 24–7, 23–16
| Pts: Carroll 13; Rebs: Reyes 8 Asts: Fernández 8 | | Pts: Redding 14; Rebs: Renfroe 6 Asts: Renfroe 5 |

Palacio de Deportes de la Comunidad de Madrid, Madrid
Attendance: 10,682
Referees: Eddie Viator (FRA), Srdan Dozai (CRO), Petros Papapetrou (GRE)

13 March 2015
18:45

Report

| Žalgiris (Lithuania) | 76–70 | (Greece) Panathinaikos |
Scoring by quarter: 17–13, 22–15, 16–27, 21–15
| Pts: Cherry 18; Rebs: Anderson, Ulanovas 6 Asts: Ulanovas 5 | | Pts: Pappas 21; Rebs: Mavrokefalidis 6 Asts: Diamantidis 5 |

Žalgiris Arena, Kaunas
Attendance: 9,984
Referees: Borys Ryzhyk (UKR), Recep Ankarali (TUR), Benjamin Jimenez (ESP)

=== Game 11 ===
19 March 2015
19:15

Report

| Crvena Zvezda (Serbia) | 73–77 | (Spain) FC Barcelona |
Scoring by quarter: 15–15, 17–22, 18–11, 23–29
| Pts: Marjanović 23; Rebs: Marjanović 11; Asts: Williams 7 | | Pts: Navarro 12; Rebs: Satoransky 10; Asts: Satoransky 5 |

Kombank Arena, Belgrade
Attendance: 18,450
Referees: Eddie Viator (FRA), Elias Koromilas (GRE), Aare Halliko (EST)

19 March 2015
20:05

Report

| Maccabi Tel Aviv (Israel) | 79–72 | (Lithuania) Žalgiris |
Scoring by quarter: 18–15, 25–19, 23–20, 13–18
| Pts: Pargo 26; Rebs: Randle 8 Asts: Ohayon 7 | | Pts: Milaknis 19; Rebs: Jankūnas 11; Asts: Anderson, Lekavičius 6 |

Menora Mivtachim Arena, Tel Aviv
Attendance: 10,728
Referees: Srdan Dozai (CRO), Vicente Bulto (ESP), Roberto Chiari (ITA)

19 March 2015
21:00

Report

| Alba Berlin (Germany) | 75–68 | (Turkey) Galatasaray |
Scoring by quarter: 16–12, 22–14, 21–18, 16–24
| Pts: Banić 15; Rebs: three players 5 Asts: Redding 10 | | Pts: Arslan, Erceg 16; Rebs: Young 6 Asts: Güler 4 |

O2 World, Berlin
Attendance: 13,259
Referees: Miguel Perez Perez (ESP), Matej Boltauzer (SLO), Oscar Perea (ESP)

20 March 2015
19:00

Report

| Panathinaikos (Greece) | 85–69 | (Spain) Real Madrid |
Scoring by quarter: 19–15, 22–20, 28–18, 16–16
| Pts: Pappas 22; Rebs: Batista, Mavrokefalidis 9 Asts: Janković 6 | | Pts: Carroll 16; Rebs: five players 4 Asts: Rodríguez 5 |

O.A.C.A., Athens
Attendance: 14,766
Referees: Ilija Belosevic (SRB), Fernando Rocha (POR), Piotr Pastusiak (POL)

=== Game 12 ===
25 March 2015
18:45

Report

| Žalgiris (Lithuania) | 72–83 | (Spain) FC Barcelona |
Scoring by quarter: 16–22, 17–20, 20–23, 19–18
| Pts: Anderson 24; Rebs: Jankūnas 9 Asts: Lekavičius 5 | | Pts: Abrines 16; Rebs: Pleiß 7 Asts: Huertas 5 |

Žalgiris Arena, Kaunas
Attendance: 9,988
Referees: Fernando Rocha (POR), Paolo Taurino (ITA), Milija Vojinovic (SRB)

26 March 2015
20:15

Report

| Alba Berlin (Germany) | 73–68 | (Serbia) Crvena Zvezda |
Scoring by quarter: 22–9, 17–13, 20–27, 14–19
| Pts: Banić 18; Rebs: Redding 7 Asts: Redding 11 | | Pts: Marjanović 27; Rebs: Mitrović, Marjanović 10; Asts: Jović 5 |

O2 World, Berlin
Attendance: 10,867
Referees: Luigi Lamonica (ITA), Ioannis Foufis (GRE), Carlos Peruga (ESP)

27 March 2015
19:00

Report

| Galatasaray (Turkey) | 84–86 | (Greece) Panathinaikos |
Scoring by quarter: 16–23, 22–17, 21–19, 25–27
| Pts: Young 24; Rebs: Young 9 Asts: Micov 7 | | Pts: Gist, Batista 14; Rebs: Janković, Batista 6 Asts: Diamantidis 9 |

Abdi İpekçi Arena, Istanbul
Attendance: 3,138
Referees: Dani Hierrezuelo (ESP), Emilio Perez Pizarro (ESP), Damir Javor (SLO)

27 March 2015
20:45

Report

| Real Madrid (Spain) | 86–75 | (Israel) Maccabi Tel Aviv |
Scoring by quarter: 27–13, 19–27, 20–14, 20–21
| Pts: Carroll 18; Rebs: Reyes 9 Asts: Llull 9 | | Pts: Randle 17; Rebs: Randle, Alexander 7 Asts: Pargo 7 |

Palacio de Deportes de la Comunidad de Madrid, Madrid
Attendance: 12,350
Referees: Christos Christodoulou (GRE), Recep Anakrali (TUR) Matej Boltauzer (SLO)

=== Game 13 ===
2 April 2015
20:05

Report

| Maccabi Tel Aviv (Israel) | 81–72 | (Turkey) Galatasaray |
Scoring by quarter: 23–23, 20–19, 15–11, 23–19
| Pts: Smith 22; Rebs: Smith, Tyus 8 Asts: Pargo 8 | | Pts: Gönlüm 18; Rebs: Carter, Young 7 Asts: Pocius 5 |

Menora Mivtachim Arena, Tel Aviv
Attendance: 10,728
Referees: Sreten Radovic (CRO), Panagiotis Anastopoulos (GRE), Carlos Peruga (ESP)

2 April 2015
20:45

Report

| FC Barcelona (Spain) | 85–80 | (Spain) Real Madrid |
Scoring by quarter: 17–25, 24–16, 23–21, 21–18
| Pts: Hezonja 15; Rebs: Tomić 8 Asts: Navarro, Satoransky 5 | | Pts: Fernández 20; Rebs: Nocioni, Ayón, Carroll 5 Asts: Llull 8 |

Palau Blaugrana, Barcelona
Attendance: 8,529
Referees: Borys Ryzhyk (UKR), Robert Lottermoser (GER), Olegs Latisevs (LAT)

2 April 2015
20:45

Report

| Panathinaikos (Greece) | 66–68 | (Germany) Alba Berlin |
Scoring by quarter: 21–23, 19–10, 15–13, 11–22
| Pts: Diamantidis 18; Rebs: Fotsis 5 Asts: Diamantidis 4 | | Pts: Renfroe 16; Rebs: McLean 11; Asts: Renfroe 9 |

O.A.C.A., Athens
Attendance: 11,757
Referees: Juan Carlos Garcia Gonzalez (ESP), Milivoje Jovcic (SRB), Rustu Nuran (TUR)

3 April 2015
18:45

Report

| Žalgiris (Lithuania) | 76–70 | (Serbia) Crvena Zvezda |
Scoring by quarter: 12–12, 28–15, 11–28, 25–15
| Pts: Jankūnas 19; Rebs: Jankūnas 9 Asts: Anderson 5 | | Pts: Marjanović 14; Rebs: Marjanović 12; Asts: Williams 5 |

Žalgiris Arena, Kaunas
Attendance: 9,015
Referees: Dani Hierrezuelo (ESP), Emilio Perez Pizarro (ESP), Marcin Kowalski (POL)

=== Game 14 ===
9 April 2015
20:00

Report

| Alba Berlin (Germany) | 64–73 | (Israel) Maccabi Tel Aviv |
Scoring by quarter: 17–21, 17–20, 17–12, 13–20
| Pts: Renfroe, McLean, Radošević 10; Rebs: Redding 8 Asts: Renfroe 9 | | Pts: Smith 28; Rebs: Tyus 10; Asts: Pargo 6 |

O2 World, Berlin
Attendance: 14,133 (Tentative)
Referees: Ilija Belosevic (SRB), Dani Hierrezuelo (ESP), Carlos Cortes (ESP)

9 April 2015
20:45

Report

| Crvena Zvezda (Serbia) | 69–68 | (Greece) Panathinaikos |
Scoring by quarter: 16–7, 14–19, 14–19, 25–23
| Pts: Kalinić 14; Rebs: Marjanović 16; Asts: Williams 7 | | Pts: Batista 15; Rebs: Fotsis, Batista 6 Asts: Diamantidis 6 |

Pionir Hall, Belgrade
Attendance: 6,156 (Tentative)
Referees: Borys Ryzhyk (UKR), Carmelo Paternico (ITA), Olegs Latisevs (LAT)

10 April 2015
19:00

Report

| Galatasaray (Turkey) | 65–88 | (Spain) FC Barcelona |
Scoring by quarter: 17–21, 17–18, 17–22, 14–27
| Pts: Micov 10; Rebs: Erceg 6 Asts: Güler 7 | | Pts: Tomić 20; Rebs: Pleiß 12; Asts: Huertas, Satoranský 5 |

Abdi İpekçi Arena, Istanbul
Attendance: 0
Referees: Milivoje Jovcic (SRB), Spiros Gkontas (GRE), Joseph Bissang (FRA)

10 April 2015
21:00

Report

| Real Madrid (Spain) | 99–83 | (Lithuania) Žalgiris |
Scoring by quarter: 21–12, 19–31, 28–19, 31–21
| Pts: Reyes 17; Rebs: Rivers 9 Asts: Llull 8 | | Pts: Anderson 17; Rebs: Gudaitis 6 Asts: Milaknis 5 |

Palacio de Deportes de la Comunidad de Madrid, Madrid
Attendance: 9,622 (Tentative)
Referees: Sreten Radovic (CRO), Petros Papapetrou (GRE), Ersan Kartal (TUR)
