= Đorđe Kaplanović =

Serbian basketball player

Personal information
- Born: 21 March 1995 (age 31) Podgorica, FR Yugoslavia
- Listed height: 2.10 m (6 ft 11 in)
- Listed weight: 102 kg (225 lb)

Career information
- Playing career: 2013–present
- Position: Center / power forward

Career history
- 2013–2014: FMP
- 2014–2015: Crvena Zvezda
- 2015–2016: Asseco Gdynia
- 2016–2017: FMP
- 2017–2018: Metalac
- 2018: Dinamo București
- 2018–2019: Metalac
- 2019–2020: EuroNickel 2005
- 2020–2021: Sloboda Tuzla
- 2021: Zlatibor
- 2021: Kumanovo

Career highlights
- ABA League champion (2015); Serbian League champion (2015); Serbian Cup winner (2015)
Medals
Men's basketball
Representing Serbia
U20 European Championship
Bronze medal – third place	2014 Greece	Team
Gold medal – first place	2015 Italy

Đorđe Kaplanović (Serbian Cyrillic: Ђорђе Каплановић; born 21 March 1995) is a Serbian professional basketball player.

== Professional career ==
On 27 September 2020, Kaplanović signed a contract for Sloboda Tuzla of the Basketball Championship of Bosnia and Herzegovina for the 2020–21 season. On 13 January 2021, Kaplanović signed for Zlatibor. Later, he was released prior his debut for Zlatibor.
