= Velibor Radović =

Montenegrin-Israeli basketball player and coach

Personal information
- Born: March 16, 1972 (age 54) Titograd, SR Montenegro, SFR Yugoslavia
- Listed height: 2.02 m (6 ft 8 in)

Career information
- NBA draft: 1994: undrafted
- Playing career: 1989–2010
- Position: Forward
- Coaching career: 2012–present

Career history

Playing
- 1989–1992: Jugoplastika
- 1993–1994: Hapoel Naharyia
- 1994–1995: Maccabi Kiryat Motzkin
- 1995–1996: Crvena zvezda
- 1996–1999: Maccabi Tel Aviv
- 1999–2000: Maccabi Ra'anana
- 2000–2001: Maccabi Tel Aviv
- 2001–2002: Maccabi Ra'anana
- 2002–2003: Crvena zvezda
- 2003–2004: SLUC Nancy Basket
- 2004–2005: Keravnos
- 2005–2006: Hapoel Tel Aviv
- 2006–2007: Slávia TU Košice
- 2007–2010: Albacomp

Coaching
- 2012–2013: Stelmet Zielona Góra (assistant)
- 2013–2017: Crvena zvezda (assistant)
- 2018–2020: Bayern Munich (assistant)

Career highlights
- As player: 2× Euroleague Champion (1990, 1991); FIBA SuproLeague (2001)
Medals
Men's basketball
Representing Yugoslavia
Europe Championship for Cadets
Silver medal – second place	1989 Spain	U16 Team

Velibor Radović (Serbian Cyrillic: Велибор Радовић; born 16 March 1972) is a Montenegrin-Israeli professional basketball coach and former player. Standing at 2.02 m (6 ft 8 in), he played as a forward.

== Career achievements ==
As assistant coach

- German League champion: 2 (with Bayern Munich: 2017–18, 2018–19)
- Serbian League champion: 3 (with Crvena zvezda: 2014–15, 2015–16, 2016–17)
- Radivoj Korać Cup winner: 3 (with Crvena zvezda: 2013–14, 2014–15, 2016–17)
- Adriatic League champion: 3 (with Crvena zvezda: 2014–15, 2015–16, 2016–17)
