= Simas Galdikas =

Lithuanian basketball player

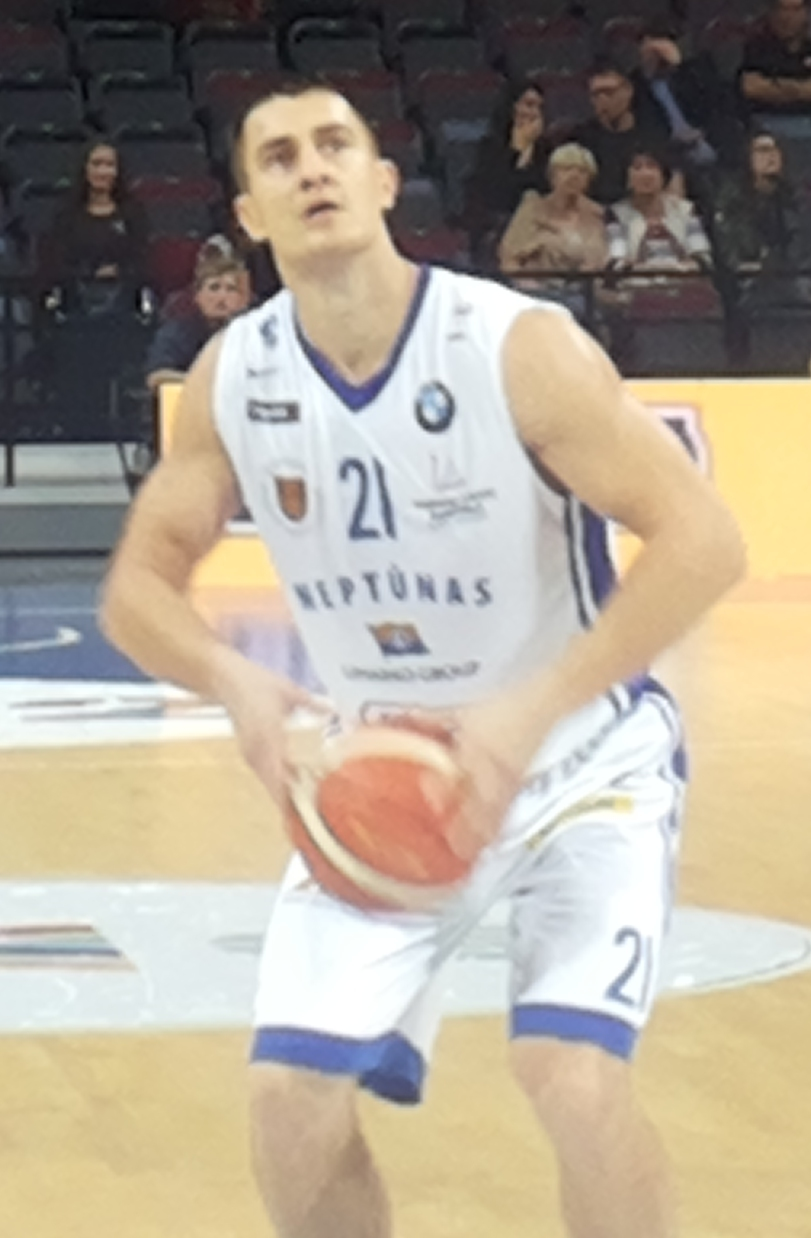
- Galdikas shooting free throws in 2015

Personal information
- Born: 3 January 1987 (age 39) Klaipėda, Lithuanian SSR, Soviet Union
- Listed height: 2.03 m (6 ft 8 in)
- Listed weight: 118 kg (260 lb)

Career information
- NBA draft: 2009: undrafted
- Playing career: 2006–2022
- Position: Center / power forward

Career history
- 2006–2007: Nafta-Uni-Laivitė Klaipėda
- 2009–2012: Neptūnas Klaipėda
- 2012: Dnipro Dnipropetrovsk
- 2012–2015: Neptūnas Klaipėda
- 2015–2016: Steaua CSM EximBank Bucharest
- 2016–2017: Lietkabelis Panevėžys
- 2017–2021: Neptūnas Klaipėda
- 2021–2022: BC Gargždai-SC

Simonas Galdikas (born 3 January 1987) is a Lithuanian former professional basketball player who last played for BC Gargždai-SC of the Lithuanian National Basketball League.

== Playing career ==
Galdikas joined Neptūnas Klaipėda in 2009, after showing good performance in Lithuania's second strongest basketball league – NKL playing for Nafta-Uni-Laivitė Klaipėda scoring 9.2 points and 5.6 rebounds in his last season at the team. While playing for the latter, he was working as a security guard in a shopping mall.

On 1 August 2016, Galdikas signed with Lietkabelis Panevėžys.

On 22 August 2017, Galdikas signed with Neptūnas Klaipėda for a two-year contract. During the 2020–21 season he averaged 6.4 points and 3.4 rebounds per game. On 8 September 2021, Galdikas signed with BC Gargždai-SC of the Lithuanian National Basketball League.

== Euroleague career statistics ==
Legend
| GP | Games played | GS | Games started | MPG | Minutes per game |
| FG% | Field-goal percentage | 3P% | 3-point field-goal percentage | FT% | Free-throw percentage |
| RPG | Rebounds per game | APG | Assists per game | SPG | Steals per game |
| BPG | Blocks per game | PPG | Points per game | PIR | Performance index rating |
| **Bold** | Career high |

| Year | Team | GP | GS | MPG | FG% | 3P% | FT% | RPG | APG | SPG | BPG | PPG | PIR |
|---|---|---|---|---|---|---|---|---|---|---|---|---|---|
| 2014–15 | Neptūnas | 10 | 9 | 19.2 | .632 | .000 | .750 | 4.7 | .9 | .8 | .3 | 6.0 | 7.8 |
| Career | | 10 | 9 | 19.2 | .632 | .000 | .750 | 4.7 | .9 | .8 | .3 | 6.0 | 7.8 |
