= Mustafa Shakur =

American basketball player (born 1984)

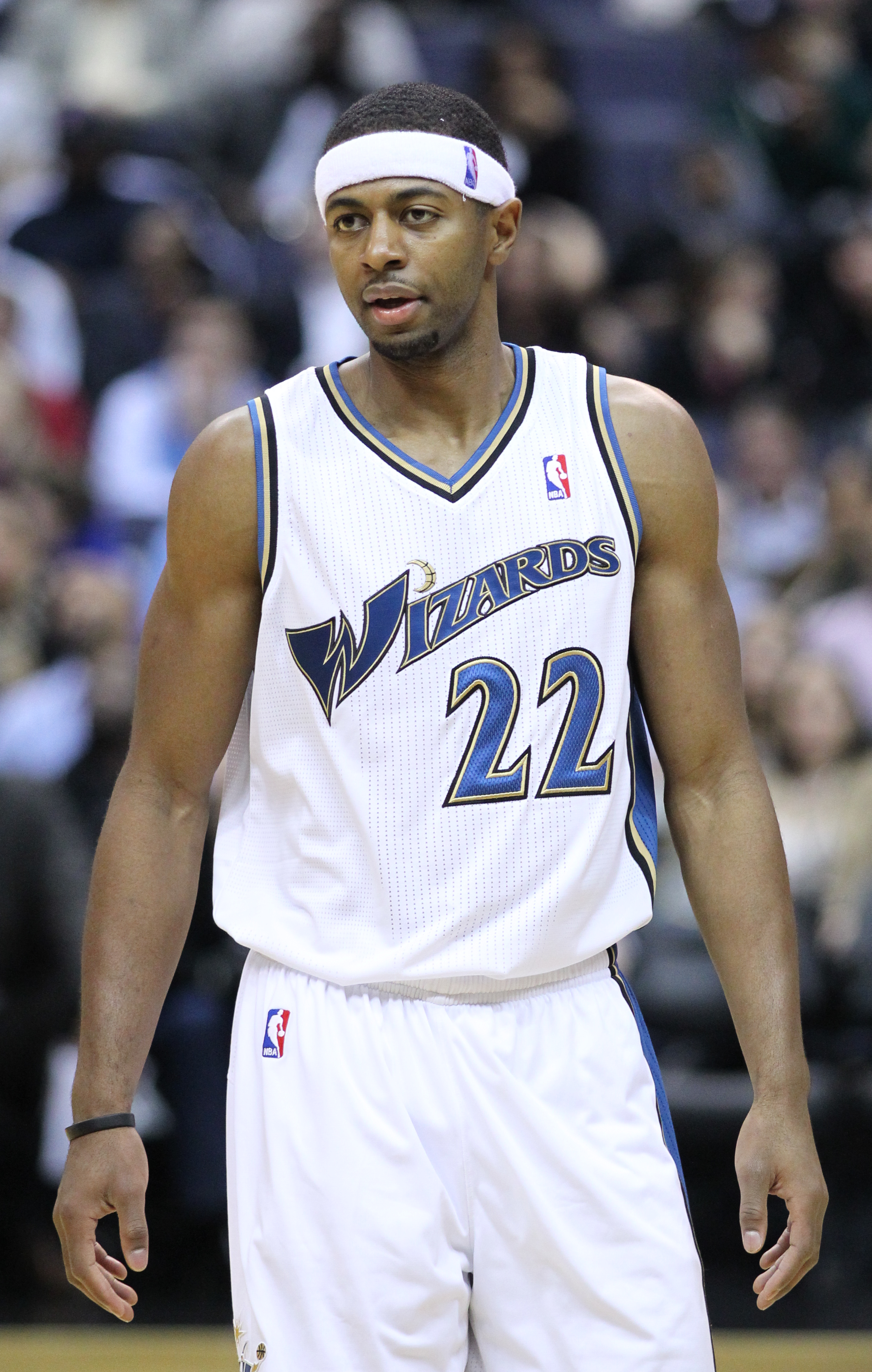
- Shakur with the Wizards in 2011

Personal information
- Born: August 18, 1984 (age 41) Philadelphia, Pennsylvania, U.S.
- Listed height: 6 ft 3 in (1.91 m)
- Listed weight: 190 lb (86 kg)

Career information
- High school: William Penn (Philadelphia, Pennsylvania); Friends' Central School (Wynnewood, Pennsylvania)
- College: Arizona (2003–2007)
- NBA draft: 2007: undrafted
- Playing career: 2007–2018
- Position: Point guard
- Number: 22

Career history
- 2007–2008: Prokom Trefl Sopot
- 2008–2009: TAU Cerámica
- 2009: Panellinios
- 2009–2010: Tulsa 66ers
- 2010–2011: Rio Grande Valley Vipers
- 2011: Washington Wizards
- 2011: Pau-Orthez
- 2011–2012: Novipiù Casale Monferrato
- 2012–2013: Sidigas Avellino
- 2013–2014: Erie BayHawks
- 2014: Tulsa 66ers
- 2014: Oklahoma City Thunder
- 2014: Tadamon Zouk
- 2014–2015: Neptūnas Klaipėda
- 2015–2016: MHP Riesen Ludwigsburg
- 2016–2017: Afyonkarahisar Belediyespor
- 2017: S.Oliver Würzburg
- 2018: Oklahoma City Blue

Career highlights
- 2× NBA D-League All-Star (2010, 2011); All-NBA D-League Second Team (2010); PLK champion (2008); Pac-10 All-Freshman Team (2004); McDonald's All-American (2003)
- Stats at NBA.com
- Stats at Basketball Reference

Mustafadeen Abdush-Shakur (born August 18, 1984) is an American former professional basketball player. He played college basketball for the Arizona Wildcats and has previously played professionally in Europe, Lebanon, the NBA D-League and the National Basketball Association (NBA).

== High school career ==
Shakur attended William Penn High School in Philadelphia as a sophomore in 2000–01, before transferring to Friends' Central School for his junior year. As a junior in 2001–02, he averaged 18.8 points, 6.0 rebounds, 4.0 assists and 2.0 steals per game to lead Friends' Central to the Friends League title. He also earned first team all-state and all-Friends kudos, while claiming second-team all-city and all-public honors.

On November 13, 2002, he signed a National Letter of Intent to play college basketball for the University of Arizona.

As a senior in 2002–03, he averaged 26.8 points, 6.8 assists and 4.1 steals per game while earning USA Today High School Boys all-USA first team, EA Sports All-America, ABCD Camp All-Star and first-team all-state honors. He also earned Gatorade Pennsylvania Player of the Year and McDonald's All-American honors.

== College career ==
In his freshman season at Arizona, Shakur was named to the Pac-10 All-Freshman Team. In 30 games, he averaged 9.4 points, 3.6 rebounds and 4.5 assists per game.

In his sophomore season, he was a member of the preseason Naismith Award watch list, and went on to average 8.1 points, 3.6 rebounds, 4.5 assists and 1.2 steals in 37 games.

In his junior season, he was the only Wildcat to start every game as he ended the season with 455 career assists, a figure that is tied for ninth on the UA career list. In 33 games, he averaged 11.2 points, 3.7 rebounds, 4.7 assists and 1.5 steals per game.

On April 12, 2006, he declared for the NBA draft, but later withdrew his name from consideration on June 18, 2006.

In his senior season, he earned honorable mention all-Pac-10 honors after finishing his career ranked 22nd on the UA career points scored list (1,318), second in assists (670), third in games started (129), fourth in minutes played (4,070), fifth in games played (131), seventh in average minutes per game (31.1), and 10th in steals (156). His 215 assists in 2006–07 was the fourth-highest single-season total in school history, and subsequently finished his career with more assists (670) than any other player in the Lute Olson era. In 31 games, he averaged 11.9 points, 4.0 rebounds, 6.9 assists and 1.5 steals per game.

=== College statistics ===
Year	Team	GP	GS	MPG	FG%	3P%	FT%	RPG	APG	SPG	BPG	PPG
2003–04	Arizona	30	28	30.2	.519	.396	.803	3.6	4.5	.6	.0	9.4
2004–05	Arizona	37	37	28.9	.423	.378	.738	3.6	4.5	1.2	.1	8.1
2005–06	Arizona	33	33	30.7	.423	.333	.806	3.7	4.7	1.5	.1	11.2
2006–07	Arizona	31	31	34.8	.455	.325	.788	4.0	6.9	1.5	.2	11.9
Career		131	129	31.0	.452	.355	.786	3.7	5.1	1.2	.1	10.1

== Professional career ==
=== 2007–08 season ===
Shakur went undrafted in the 2007 NBA draft. On July 5, 2007, he signed with the Sacramento Kings and joined them for the 2007 NBA Summer League. However, he was later waived by the Kings on October 31, 2007. The next month, he signed with Prokom Trefl Sopot of Poland for the rest of the season.

=== 2008–09 season ===
In July 2008, Shakur joined the Charlotte Bobcats for the 2008 NBA Summer League. On September 16, 2008, he signed a one-year deal with TAU Cerámica of the Liga ACB. On January 22, 2009, his contract was terminated by Cerámica. The next day, he signed with Panellinios of Greece for the rest of the season.

=== 2009–10 season ===
In July 2009, Shakur joined the Los Angeles Lakers for the 2009 NBA Summer League. On September 27, 2009, he signed with the Minnesota Timberwolves. However, he was waived by the Timberwolves on October 19, 2009. On November 5, 2009, he was selected in the second round of the 2009 NBA D-League draft by the Tulsa 66ers.

On March 16, 2010, he signed a 10-day contract with the Oklahoma City Thunder. On March 25, 2010, he was released by the Thunder before playing in a game for them. On March 31, 2010, he signed with the Thunder for the rest of the season, and was immediately assigned back down to the Tulsa 66ers. On April 14, 2010, he was recalled by the Thunder. Two days later, he was reassigned to the 66ers, and again recalled the next day.

=== 2010–11 season ===
In July 2010, Shakur joined the Oklahoma City Thunder for the 2010 NBA Summer League. On September 8, 2010, he signed with the New Orleans Hornets. However, he was later waived by the Hornets on October 18, 2010. Later that month, he was reacquired by the Tulsa 66ers. On November 2, 2010, he was traded to the Rio Grande Valley Vipers in exchange for Robert Vaden.

On January 22, 2011, he signed a 10-day contract with the Washington Wizards. On February 12, 2011, he signed a second 10-day contract with the Wizards. On February 28, 2011, he signed with the Wizards for the rest of the season.

=== 2011–12 season ===
On June 27, 2011, Shakur signed with Pau-Orthez of France for the 2011–12 season. On November 14, 2011, he was released by Pau-Orthez after just seven games. The next day, he signed with Novipiù Casale Monferrato of Italy for the rest of the season.

=== 2012–13 season ===
On September 18, 2012, Shakur signed with Sidigas Avellino of Italy for the 2012–13 season. In January 2013, he parted ways with Sidigas Avellino after 17 games.

On March 5, 2013, he was reacquired by the Rio Grande Valley Vipers. The same day, he was traded to the Erie BayHawks.

=== 2013–14 season ===
On October 31, 2013, Shakur was reacquired by the Erie BayHawks. On January 22, 2014, he was traded to the Tulsa 66ers.

On March 16, 2014, he signed a 10-day contract with the Oklahoma City Thunder. On March 26, 2014, he was not offered a second 10-day contract by the Thunder after his first 10-day contract expired. Two days later, he returned to the 66ers.

On April 23, 2014, he signed with Tadamon Zouk of Lebanon for the 2013–14 FLB season.

=== 2014–15 season ===
On September 12, 2014, Shakur signed with Neptūnas of Lithuania for the 2014–15 season. In 45 league games for Neptūnas, he averaged 9.4 points, 3.0 rebounds, 3.5 assists and 1.5 steals per game.

=== 2015–16 season ===
On October 5, 2016, Shakur signed with German club MHP Riesen Ludwigsburg for the 2015–16 Basketball Bundesliga season.

=== 2016–17 season ===
On September 16, 2016, Shakur signed with Afyonkarahisar Belediyespor of the Turkish Basketball First League. On January 21, 2017, he left Afyonkarahisar and signed with German club S.Oliver Würzburg for the rest of the 2016–17 Basketball Bundesliga season.

=== 2017–18 season ===
On January 23, 2018, Shakur signed with Oklahoma City Blue of the NBA G League.

== Career statistics ==
Legend
GP	Games played	GS	Games started	MPG	Minutes per game
FG%	Field-goal percentage	3P%	3-point field-goal percentage	FT%	Free-throw percentage
RPG	Rebounds per game	APG	Assists per game	SPG	Steals per game
BPG	Blocks per game	PPG	Points per game	PIR	Performance index rating
**Bold**	Career high

=== NBA ===
==== Regular season ====
Year	Team	GP	GS	MPG	FG%	3P%	FT%	RPG	APG	SPG	BPG	PPG
2010–11	Washington	**22**	0	**7.2**	**.356**	**.100**	**.533**	**1.0**	1.1	**.2**	**.1**	**2.3**
2013–14	Oklahoma City	3	0	3.7	.000	.000	.500	.0	**1.3**	.0	.0	.3
Career		25	0	6.8	.339	.091	.529	.9	1.2	.2	.1	2.1

=== Euroleague ===
Year	Team	GP	GS	MPG	FG%	3P%	FT%	RPG	APG	SPG	BPG	PPG	PIR
2007–08	Prokom Trefl Sopot	7	1	18.4	.382	**.385**	.667	2.1	2.1	0.6	**0.3**	7.6	3.7
2008–09	TAU Cerámica	**10**	2	13.7	**.425**	.167	.760	1.3	1.3	0.8	0.0	5.5	4.6
2014–15	Neptūnas	**10**	**10**	**24.8**	.396	.143	**.875**	**2.3**	**3.8**	**1.2**	0.0	**9.6**	**8.7**
Career		27	13	19.0	.397	.217	.793	1.9	2.4	0.9	0.1	7.6	5.8

=== Eurocup ===
Year	Team	GP	GS	MPG	FG%	3P%	FT%	RPG	APG	SPG	BPG	PPG	PIR
2008–09	Panellinios	**6**	0	12.2	**.538**	**.500**	.615	0.8	1.2	1.0	0.0	6.3	5.7
2014–15	Neptūnas	**6**	**6**	**23.2**	.486	.333	**.762**	**3.3**	**3.5**	**1.3**	**0.2**	**8.7**	**11.5**
Career		12	6	17.6	.508	.400	.706	2.1	2.3	1.2	0.1	7.5	8.5

=== NBA D-League ===
==== Regular season ====
Year	Team	GP	GS	MPG	FG%	3P%	FT%	RPG	APG	SPG	BPG	PPG
2009–10	Tulsa	**47**	**47**	**37.8**	.488	**.382**	.747	4.5	**6.9**	**2.3**	.2	**19.3**
2010–11	Rio Grande Valley	23	23	36.4	.488	.320	.711	4.7	5.0	1.9	.3	16.7
2012–13	Erie	7	7	**37.8**	.441	.353	.800	4.4	5.6	**2.3**	.3	17.1
2013–14	Erie	17	17	32.2	**.492**	.361	.761	3.6	5.4	1.1	.2	14.6
2013–14	Tulsa	23	22	36.4	.467	.300	**.840**	**5.0**	6.8	**2.3**	**.4**	14.6
Career		117	116	36.5	.481	.344	.764	4.5	6.2	2.0	.3	17.9

==== Playoffs ====
Year	Team	GP	GS	MPG	FG%	3P%	FT%	RPG	APG	SPG	BPG	PPG
2009–10	Tulsa	4	4	32.9	.510	.375	.786	4.5	3.8	2.0	1.0	16.0
Career		4	4	32.9	.510	.375	.786	4.5	3.8	2.0	1.0	16.0

== International career ==
Shakur was a member of the 2003 USA Basketball Men's Junior National Team, which finished fifth at the World Championships with a 7–1 record. He averaged 5.0 points, 1.1 rebounds and 2.8 assists during the eight-game tournament in Thessaloniki, Greece, where his best effort was a 10-point (4-of-7 FG), four-assist, five-steal performance vs. Slovenia on July 19.

In 2004, he helped the USA World Championship for Young Men Qualifying team post a 5–0 record and win the gold medal by averaging 3.0 points, 1.3 rebounds and 0.5 assists per game during the tournament in Halifax, Nova Scotia, Canada. His best effort was a six-point, two-rebound, two-assist performance in USA's 87–64 win over Brazil on July 29.
