= Luka Mitrović =

Serbian basketball player (born 1993)

Luka Mitrović Лука Митровић
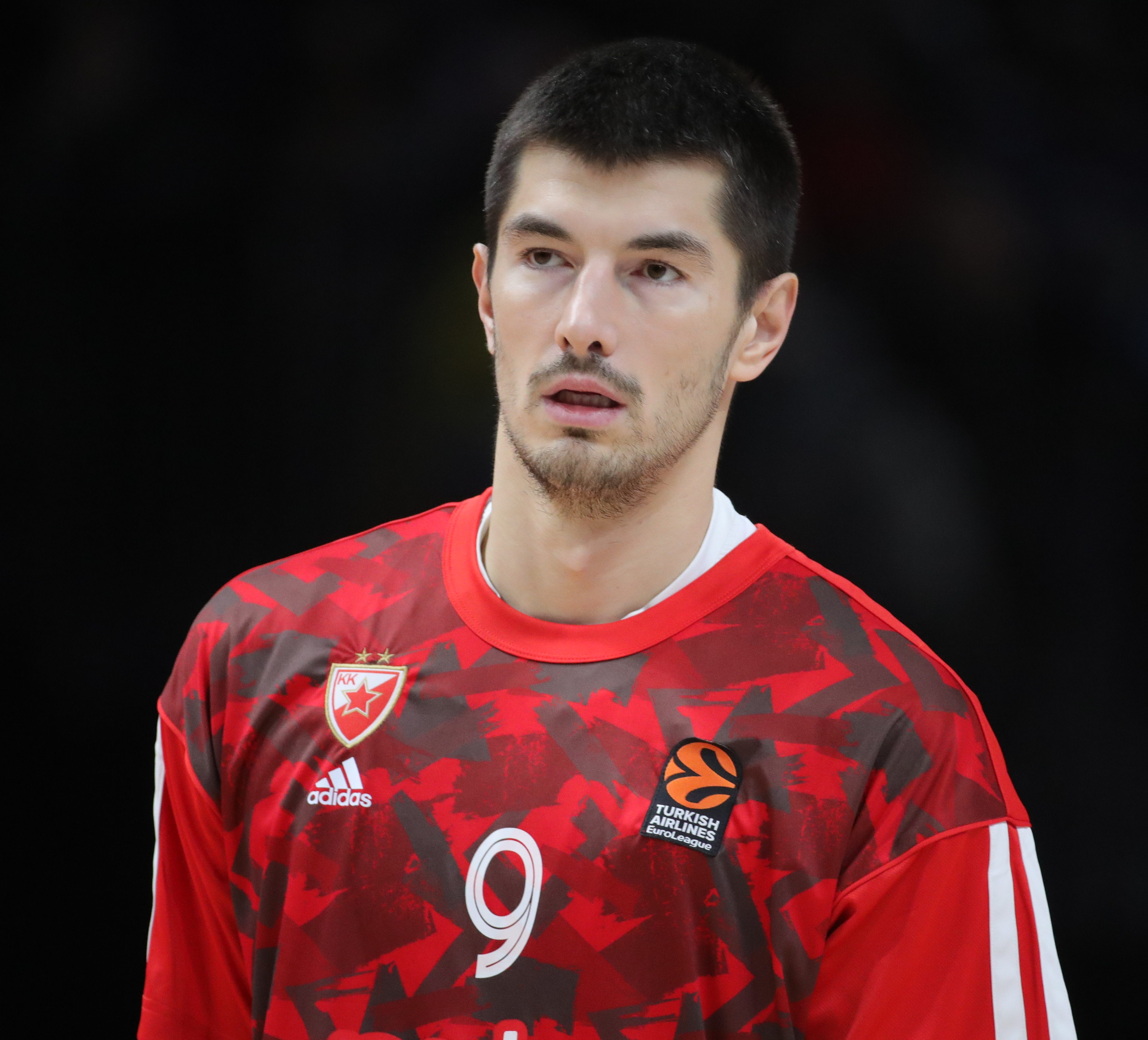
- Mitrović with Crvena zvezda in 2022

No. 99 – Bahçeşehir Koleji
- Position: Power forward / center
- League: Basketbol Süper Ligi; EuroCup

Personal information
- Born: 21 March 1993 (age 33) Novi Sad, Serbia, FR Yugoslavia
- Listed height: 2.06 m (6 ft 9 in)
- Listed weight: 102 kg (225 lb)

Career information
- NBA draft: 2015: 2nd round, 60th overall pick
- Drafted by: Philadelphia 76ers
- Playing career: 2005–present

Career history
- 2011–2012: Hemofarm
- 2012–2017: Crvena zvezda
- 2017–2018: Brose Bamberg
- 2019: UCAM Murcia
- 2019–2020: Manresa
- 2020: Hapoel Jerusalem
- 2020–2021: Budućnost
- 2021–2025: Crvena zvezda
- 2025–2026: CSKA Moscow
- 2026–present: Bahçeşehir Koleji

Career highlights
- 5× ABA League champion (2015–2017, 2022), 2024); 6× Serbian League champion (2015–2017, 2022—2024); Montenegrin League champion (2021); 8× Serbian Cup winner (2013–2015, 2017, 2022–2025); Montenegrin Cup winner (2021); Serbian Cup MVP (2015)
- Stats at Basketball Reference
Medals
Men's basketball
Representing Serbia
U19 World Championship
Silver medal – second place	2011 Latvia	U19 National Team
U18 European Championship
Silver medal – second place	2011 Poland	U18 National Team
U16 European Championship
Bronze medal – third place	2009 Lithuania	U16 National Team

Luka Mitrović (Serbian Cyrillic: Лука Митровић; born 21 March 1993) is a Serbian professional basketball player for Bahçeşehir Koleji of the Basketbol Süper Ligi (BSL) and the EuroCup. Standing at 6 ft 9 in (2.06 m), he plays at the power forward and center positions. Mitrović was the final selection of the 2015 NBA draft.

== Club career ==
=== Early years ===
Mitrović started playing basketball in Novi Sad-based club Kadet. In 2009, he moved to Hemofarm where he first played for the youth team. In the 2010–11 season, he signed his first professional contract with the team.

=== Crvena zvezda (2012–2017) ===
In 2012, he signed a contract with Crvena zvezda. In the 2013–14 season, his role in the team increased, becoming off-the-bench player. He also played the EuroLeague for the first time in his career. Over 7 EuroLeague games, he averaged 3.6 points and 4 rebounds per game. Before the start of 2014–15 season, he was promoted in the team captain. On 21 November 2014 he posted a career-high 30 points in a double overtime 103–110 loss against Galatasaray. Over 24 EuroLeague games, he averaged 8.6 points, 5.2 rebounds and 2.3 assists per game, all career-high. In 2014–15 season, Crvena zvezda won the Adriatic League championship, the Serbian League championship and the Radivoj Korać Cup.

On 26 August he extended his contract with Crvena zvezda until 2017. On 18 October 2015, in a game against Union Olimpija, he suffered a left knee injury which should keep him off-the-court for a few months.

On 8 September 2016, he re-signed with the team until the end of 2017–18 season. In November 2016, he had minor muscle strain which kept him off the court for 10 days.

=== Stints in Europe (2017–2021) ===
On 29 June 2017, Mitrović signed a three-year contract with German club Brose Bamberg. In July 2018, he parted ways with the club.

On 10 January 2019, Mitrović joined UCAM Murcia. He averaged 4.9 points and 4.2 rebounds per game. On October 17, 2019, he signed with Manresa.

On 23 August 2020, Mitrović signed with Hapoel Jerusalem of the Israeli Premier League. He played his only game for Hapoel Jerusalem in the quarterfinals of the 2020 Basketball Champions League Final Eight.

On 21 October 2020, Mitrović signed with Budućnost of the Prva A Liga and the ABA League.

=== Back to Crvena zvezda (2021–2025) ===
On June 18, 2021, he has signed with Crvena zvezda of the Adriatic League. The club won ABA League, Serbian League, and Serbian Cup in the 2021–22 season.

=== Bahçeşehir Koleji (2026–present) ===
On October 6, 2026, Mitrović signed with Bahçeşehir Koleji of the Basketbol Süper Ligi (BSL).

=== NBA draft rights ===
On 25 June 2015, Mitrović was the final pick of the 2015 NBA draft, after being selected by the Philadelphia 76ers.

On 10 July 2015, the Sacramento Kings acquired Mitrović and Artūras Gudaitis from the Philadelphia 76ers in exchange for Carl Landry, Jason Thompson, and Nik Stauskas.

On November 3, 2023, the Los Angeles Clippers acquired the rights to Mitrović from Sacramento in exchange for Filip Petrušev, a former teammate of his during the 2022–23 season.

== Career achievements ==
- Serbian League champion: 3 (with Crvena zvezda: 2014–15, 2015–16, 2016–17)
- Montenegrin League champion: 1 (with Budućnost: 2020–21)
- Radivoj Korać Cup winner: 5 (with Crvena zvezda: 2012–13, 2013–14, 2014–15, 2016–17, 2021–22)
- Montenegrin Cup winner: 1 (with Budućnost: 2020–21)
- Adriatic League champion: 4 (with Crvena zvezda: 2014–15, 2015–16, 2016–17, 2021–22)

== Career statistics ==
Legend
GP	Games played	GS	Games started	MPG	Minutes per game
FG%	Field-goal percentage	3P%	3-point field-goal percentage	FT%	Free-throw percentage
RPG	Rebounds per game	APG	Assists per game	SPG	Steals per game
BPG	Blocks per game	PPG	Points per game	PIR	Performance index rating
**Bold**	Career high

=== EuroLeague ===
Year	Team	GP	GS	MPG	FG%	3P%	FT%	RPG	APG	SPG	BPG	PPG	PIR
2013–14	Crvena zvezda	7	5	13.9	.409	.125	.750	4.0	1.0	.4	.3	3.6	6.7
2014–15	Crvena zvezda	24	20	**24.7**	.429	.175	**.780**	**5.2**	**2.3**	**1.0**	.2	8.6	9.7
2015–16	Crvena zvezda	4	1	10.5	.500	**1.000**	.500	2.5	.3	—	**.5**	4.5	4.0
2016–17	Crvena zvezda	28	**27**	15.7	.450	.167	.536	2.3	1.4	.5	.1	4.1	4.3
2017–18	Bamberg	16	5	13.7	.509	.375	.533	3.1	.7	.2	.2	4.2	4.6
2021–22	Crvena zvezda	**31**	11	19.9	.594	.000	.680	4.3	1.7	.6	.2	8.3	10.6
2022–23	Crvena zvezda	**31**	9	18.9	**.639**	**1.000**	.687	4.4	1.9	.3	.2	7.6	10.2
2023–24	Crvena zvezda	**31**	19	19.6	.593	.333	.685	4.9	1.7	.6	.3	**9.4**	**12.3**
Career		172	97	18.6	.537	.212	.676	4.1	1.6	.5	.2	7.1	8.8

=== EuroCup ===
Year	Team	GP	GS	MPG	FG%	3P%	FT%	RPG	APG	SPG	BPG	PPG	PIR
2010–11	Hemofarm	1	0	2.0	.000	—	—	—	—	—	—	0.0	-1.0
2012–13	Crvena zvezda	5	0	4.0	**.667**	—	**.667**	.2	.2	—	.2	1.6	1.4
2013–14	Crvena zvezda	1	0	11.0	.500	—	—	**4.0**	—	**1.0**	—	2.0	**7.0**
2020–21	Budućnost	**14**	**1**	**11.4**	.355	—	.552	2.9	**.5**	**1.0**	**.3**	**2.7**	3.9
Career		21	1	9.1	.378	—	.571	2.1	.4	.7	.2	2.3	3.2

=== Basketball Champions League ===
Year	Team	GP	GS	MPG	FG%	3P%	FT%	RPG	APG	SPG	BPG	PPG
2018–19	UCAM Murcia	3	**2**	**21.6**	.467	.000	.750	**6.7**	2.0	**1.3**	**1.0**	5.7
2019–20	Manresa	**7**	**2**	18.4	.543	.000	**.773**	3.9	**2.9**	.4	.3	7.9
2019–20	Hapoel Jerusalem	1	0	15.0	**.714**	—	.600	4.0	—	—	—	**13.0**
Career		11	4	1.4	.544	.000	.742	4.6	2.4	.6	.5	7.7

=== Domestic leagues ===
Year	Team	League	GP	MPG	FG%	3P%	FT%	RPG	APG	SPG	BPG	PPG
2010–11	(Serbia) Hemofarm	KLS	2	13.5	.000	—	—	3.5	—	.5	—	0.0
2010–11	(Serbia) Hemofarm	ABA	1	8.0	—	—	—	1.0	—	1.0	—	0.0
2011–12	(Serbia) Hemofarm	KLS	14	24.0	.539	.111	.724	5.9	1.5	.4	.3	7.4
2011–12	(Serbia) Hemofarm	ABA	24	12.8	.525	.250	.700	2.1	.9	.4	.0	3.3
2012–13	(Serbia) Crvena zvezda	KLS	14	7.5	.478	.667	.667	2.1	.4	—	.1	2.1
2012–13	(Serbia) Crvena zvezda	ABA	14	5.1	.368	—	.500	1.2	.1	.1	—	1.4
2013–14	(Serbia) Smederevo	KLS	13	2.8	.500	1.000	.500	.2	—	.1	—	0.4
2013–14	(Serbia) Crvena zvezda	KLS	16	18.4	.540	.500	.667	5.2	1.9	.4	.4	5.5
2013–14	(Serbia) Crvena zvezda	ABA	12	12.7	.405	.333	.650	3.2	1.0	.5	—	3.7
2014–15	(Serbia) Smederevo	KLS	3	2.0	—	—	—	—	—	—	—	0.0
2014–15	(Serbia) Crvena zvezda	KLS	18	25.2	.504	.344	.825	6.0	2.5	1.1	.2	10.7
2014–15	(Serbia) Crvena zvezda	ABA	33	23.9	.492	.341	.787	5.9	2.1	.9	.6	10.0
2015–16	(Serbia) OKK Beograd	KLS	17	10.3	.356	.500	.364	1.1	1.1	.4	—	2.2
2015–16	(Serbia) Crvena zvezda	KLS	12	19.9	.541	.357	.722	4.1	1.7	.8	.4	9.2
2015–16	(Serbia) Crvena zvezda	ABA	9	22.8	.551	.350	.724	5.3	2.1	.8	.7	9.1
2016–17	(Serbia) Crvena zvezda	KLS	19	19.4	.598	.500	.636	4.8	2.4	.8	.5	6.8
2016–17	(Serbia) Crvena zvezda	ABA	30	19.6	.485	.349	.686	5.4	2.4	.5	.4	7.1
2017–18	(Germany) Bamberg	BBL	19	19.5	.526	.063	.767	4.6	2.2	.5	.2	7.7
2018–19	(Spain) UCAM Murcia	ACB	17	16.1	.492	.444	.765	3.8	1.4	.3	.1	4.8
2019–20	(Spain) Manresa	ACB	17	16.3	.580	.000	.565	3.9	1.9	.3	.2	8.3
2020–21	(Montenegro) Budućnost	Prva A	2	21.8	.833	—	.500	9.0	4.5	1.5	—	11.0
2020–21	(Montenegro) Budućnost	ABA	24	11.8	.614	—	.773	3.2	1.0	.3	.1	4.3
2021–22	(Serbia) Crvena zvezda	KLS	5	14.4	.586	.000	.583	4.8	1.2	.2	—	8.2
2021–22	(Serbia) Crvena zvezda	ABA	34	17.7	.602	.500	.761	4.6	1.4	.7	.2	8.6
2022–23	(Serbia) Crvena zvezda	KLS	2	20.6	.706	—	.867	6.0	1.5	1.0	—	18.5
2022–23	(Serbia) Crvena zvezda	ABA	33	17.7	.665	—	.702	3.9	1.8	.7	.3	9.2
2023–24	(Serbia) Crvena zvezda	KLS	3	17.9	.850	—	.615	5.7	2.7	.7	—	14.0
2023–24	(Serbia) Crvena zvezda	ABA	31	17.0	.680	.000	.656	4.1	2.2	.7	.2	9.8

== Personal life ==
Mitrović has been dating Nina Micić, a Serbian Olympic snowboarder and sister of basketball player Vasilije Micić.

== See also ==
- List of NBA drafted players from Serbia
- Philadelphia 76ers draft history

Sporting positions
Preceded by Marko Simonović	Crvena zvezda captain 2014–2017	Succeeded by Branko Lazić
