= Zoran Erceg =

Serbian basketball player

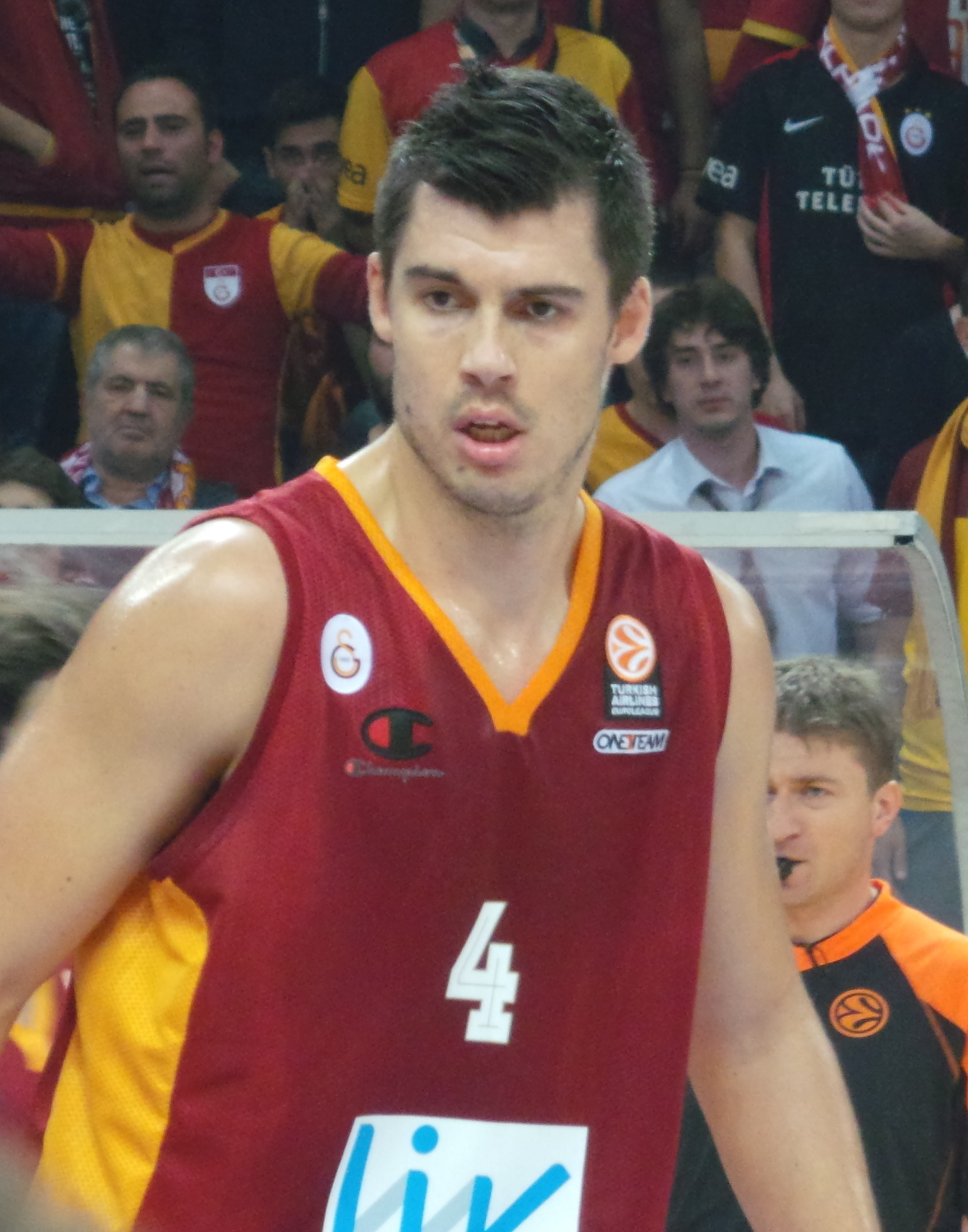
- Erceg with Galatasaray in October 2013.

Personal information
- Born: 11 January 1985 (age 41) Pakrac, SR Croatia, SFR Yugoslavia
- Listed height: 2.11 m (6 ft 11 in)
- Listed weight: 112 kg (247 lb)

Career information
- NBA draft: 2007: undrafted
- Playing career: 2002–2015
- Position: Power forward
- Number: 4, 7, 14, 17

Career history
- 2002–2003: Polet Novi Bečej
- 2003–2008: FMP
- 2006: →Borac Čačak
- 2008–2011: Olympiacos
- 2009–2010: →Panionios
- 2011–2012: Beşiktaş
- 2012–2013: CSKA Moscow
- 2013–2015: Galatasaray

Career highlights
- VTB League champion (2013); RBSL champion (2013); EuroChallenge champion (2012); TBSL champion (2012); Turkish All-Star (2012); Turkish Cup winner (2012); Greek Cup winner (2011); 2× Greek All-Star (2010, 2011); All-Greek League Second Team (2010); ABA League champion (2006); 2× Radivoj Korać Cup winner (2005, 2007); ABA League Final Four MVP (2007); Serbian League Top Scorer (2008)

Zoran Erceg (Serbian Cyrillic: Зоран Ерцег; born 11 January 1985) is a Serbian former professional basketball player. He represented the Serbian national basketball team internationally. Standing at 6 ft 11 in (2.11 m), he played the power forward position.

== Professional career ==
=== Early years ===
Erceg started playing professionally with Polet Keramika Novi Bečej in 2002, before going to FMP in 2003. In 2006 he was shortly loaned to Borac Čačak.

=== Olympiacos (2008–11) ===
He signed a 5-year contract with the Greek team Olympiacos Piraeus in June 2008. In December 2009, Erceg was loaned to Panionios for the rest of the 2009–10 season.

=== Beşiktaş (2011–12) ===
In August 2011, he signed a one-year deal with the Turkish team Beşiktaş. With them, he won every competition they participated in, the Turkish League championship, Turkish Cup and a third-tier European competition EuroChallenge. His games in Beşiktaş attracted the interest of many European big clubs.

=== CSKA Moscow (2012–13) ===
On 29 June 2012 he signed a three-year contract with the Russian team CSKA Moscow. During his stint in CSKA, Erceg has mostly came off-the-bench, producing 6.2 points and 2.5 rebounds per game. He won the Russian League championship and the VTB United League.

=== Galatasaray (2013–15) ===
Despite having a three-year contract, Erceg terminated it and signed a two-year contract with Galatasaray Liv Hospital in July 2013. In the new team, Erceg had bigger role than in his previous team. In April Euroleague game overtime loss against his former team CSKA Moscow, he set career-high and also team record 35 points, while also adding 9 rebounds and 2 steals. He finished season with career-highs of 11.2 points and 4.9 rebounds over 25 games. In the 2014–15 season his role in the team increased even more. He had a season-high 32 points in a double overtime 110–103 victory over Crvena zvezda. He also hit a 30 feet far buzzer-beater to put the game in an overtime. For such performance, he was named the Euroleague MVP of Round 6, for the first time in his career.

== National team career ==
Erceg played with the senior Serbian national basketball team at the EuroBasket 2007.

He represented Serbia once again at the EuroBasket 2015 under head coach Aleksandar Đorđević. In the first phase of the tournament, Serbia dominated in the toughest Group B with 5-0 record, and then eliminated Finland and Czech Republic in the round-of-16 and quarterfinals, respectively. Erceg had his best performance scoring 20 points against Czech Republic in the quarterfinal game. However, Serbia was stopped in the semifinal game by Lithuania 64–67, and eventually lost to the host team France in the bronze-medal game 68–81. Over 9 tournament games, Erceg averaged 8.3 points, 2.6 rebounds, and 1.2 assists per game on 52.4% shooting from the field.

== Career statistics ==
Legend
GP	Games played	GS	Games started	MPG	Minutes per game
FG%	Field-goal percentage	3P%	3-point field-goal percentage	FT%	Free-throw percentage
RPG	Rebounds per game	APG	Assists per game	SPG	Steals per game
BPG	Blocks per game	PPG	Points per game	PIR	Performance index rating
**Bold**	Career high

=== EuroLeague ===
Year	Team	GP	GS	MPG	FG%	3P%	FT%	RPG	APG	SPG	BPG	PPG	PIR
2008–09	Olympiacos	20	1	11.8	**.583**	**.445**	.559	2.1	.3	.5	.1	5.0	4.5
2010–11	Olympiacos	16	4	17.8	.413	.297	.875	3.1	.5	.4	**.4**	5.9	5.7
2012–13	CSKA	15	5	14.4	.457	.375	.917	2.5	.5	.7	.1	6.2	6.5
2013–14	Galatasaray	**25**	**23**	27.5	.400	.333	**.925**	**4.9**	**1.6**	.6	.2	11.2	13.2
2014–15	Galatasaray	22	22	**30.7**	.408	.388	.899	4.3	.9	**1.2**	.1	**15.0**	**15.4**
Career		98	55	22.5	.427	.363	.854	3.6	.8	.7	.2	9.1	9.7

== See also ==
- List of Serbia men's national basketball team players
