= 2014–15 Radivoj Korać Cup =

Radivoj Korać Cup 2015
- League: Radivoj Korać Cup
- Sport: Basketball
- Duration: 19–22 February 2015
- Finals champions: Crvena zvezda
- Runners-up: Mega Vizura
- Finals MVP: (Serbia) Luka Mitrović

Radivoj Korać Cup seasons
- ← 2013–14 2015–16 →

The 2015 Radivoj Korać Cup season was the 13th season of the Serbian national basketball cup tournament.

The competition started on February 19 and concluded with the Final on February 22, 2015.

== Venue ==
Niš	2014–15 Radivoj Korać Cup (Serbia)
Čair Sports Center	2014–15 Radivoj Korać Cup (Serbia)
Capacity: 4,500	2014–15 Radivoj Korać Cup (Serbia)

== Teams ==
Eight teams competed in this years cup.

Seeded	Unseeded
Metalac Farmakom	Vršac Swisslion
Crvena zvezda	FMP
Partizan	Konstantin
Mega Leks	Vojvodina Srbijagas

== Bracket ==
Quarterfinals; February 19 and 20		Semifinals; February 21		Final; February 22
Crvena zvezda	81
Konstantin	65	Crvena zvezda	76
Partizan	81	Partizan	67
Vojvodina	54			Crvena zvezda	80
Mega Leks	92			Mega Leks	74
FMP	85	Mega Leks	85
Metalac	73	Vršac	66
Vršac	78

=== Quarterfinals ===
19 February 2015
17:00

Report

Metalac	73–78	Vršac
Scoring by quarter: 14-13, 26-20, 15-26, 18-19
Pts: Protić, Jevtović 11; Rebs: Jevtović 13; Asts: Protić 4		Pts: Davidovac 18; Rebs: Apić 12; Asts: Dimić 4

Čair Sports Center, Niš
Attendance: 1,500
Referees: Uros Obrknezevic, Marko Pecelj, Dusko Sedlar

19 February 2015
21:00

Report

Partizan	81–54	Vojvodina
Scoring by quarter: 17-11, 16-6, 32-19, 16-18
Pts: Pavlović 14; Rebs: Tepić, Milutinov, Mačvan 7 Asts: Pavlović 3		Pts: Šešlija 9 Rebs: Popović 6 Asts: Novak, Popović, Grubor 2

Čair Sports Center, Niš
Attendance: 4,400
Referees: Marko Juras, Caslav Cukalovic, Vladimir Veskovic

20 February 2015
17:00

Report

Mega Leks	92–85	FMP
Scoring by quarter: 22-26, 27-22, 21-21, 22-16
Pts: Kešelj 28; Rebs: Musli 13; Asts: Miljenović 13		Pts: Mićović 21; Rebs: Lazarević 10; Asts: Čović 8

Čair Sports Center, Niš
Attendance: 1,800
Referees: Uros Nikolic, Vladimir Jevtovic, Ivan Stefanovic

20 February 2015
21:00

Report

Crvena zvezda	81–65	Konstantin
Scoring by quarter: 32-16, 22-14, 19-15, 8-20
Pts: Marjanović 15; Rebs: Mitrović 6 Asts: Jović 5		Pts: Ostojić 12; Rebs: Obrenović 7 Asts: Veličković 6

Čair Sports Center, Niš
Attendance: 4,500
Referees: Milan Mazic, Branislav Mrdak, Rados Arsenijevic

=== Semifinals ===
21 February 2015
18:30

Report

Vršac	66–85	Mega Leks
Scoring by quarter: 22-27, 15-18, 6-25, 23-15
Pts: Tomašević 14; Rebs: Davidovac, Tomašević 6 Asts: Davidovac 3		Pts: Zagorac 17; Rebs: Jokić, Nikolić 6 Asts: Miljenović 7

Čair Sports Center, Niš
Attendance: 4,500
Referees: Dragan Neskovic, Sasa Maricic, Aleksandar Glisic

21 February 2015
21:00

Report

Partizan	67–76	Crvena zvezda
Scoring by quarter: 18-26, 16-17, 16-13, 17-20
Pts: Mačvan 20; Rebs: Murić, Milutinov, Mačvan 5 Asts: Milosavljević 3		Pts: Blažič 15; Rebs: Mitrović 7 Asts: Williams 2

Čair Sports Center, Niš
Attendance: 4,500
Referees: Ilija Belosevic, Milivoje Jovcic, Milija Vojinovic

=== Final ===
22 February 2015
17:00

Report

Mega Leks	74–80	Crvena zvezda
Scoring by quarter: 21-16, 21-19, 15-24, 17-21
Pts: Miljenović 21; Rebs: Kešelj 7 Asts: Miljenović, Jokić, Zagorac 2		Pts: Mitrović 21; Rebs: Mitrović 12; Asts: Williams 8

Čair Sports Center, Niš
Attendance: 4,500
Referees: Ilija Belosevic, Milivoje Jovcic, Uros Nikolic

Mega Leks

MVP

(Serbia) Luka Mitrović

Game rules
Game was played under FIBA rules.

2015 Radivoj Korać Cup Champions
Crvena zvezda
8th title

Crvena zvedza
