= BLS Super League MVP =

The BLS Super League MVP, or Serbian Super League MVP, is the award bestowed to the player, deemed to be the "Most Valuable Player" during the second part of a season of the Basketball League of Serbia. The Basketball League of Serbia is the top-tier level national men's professional club basketball league in Serbia. The award has existed and has been awarded by the Serbian League since the 2006–07 season.

== Winners ==
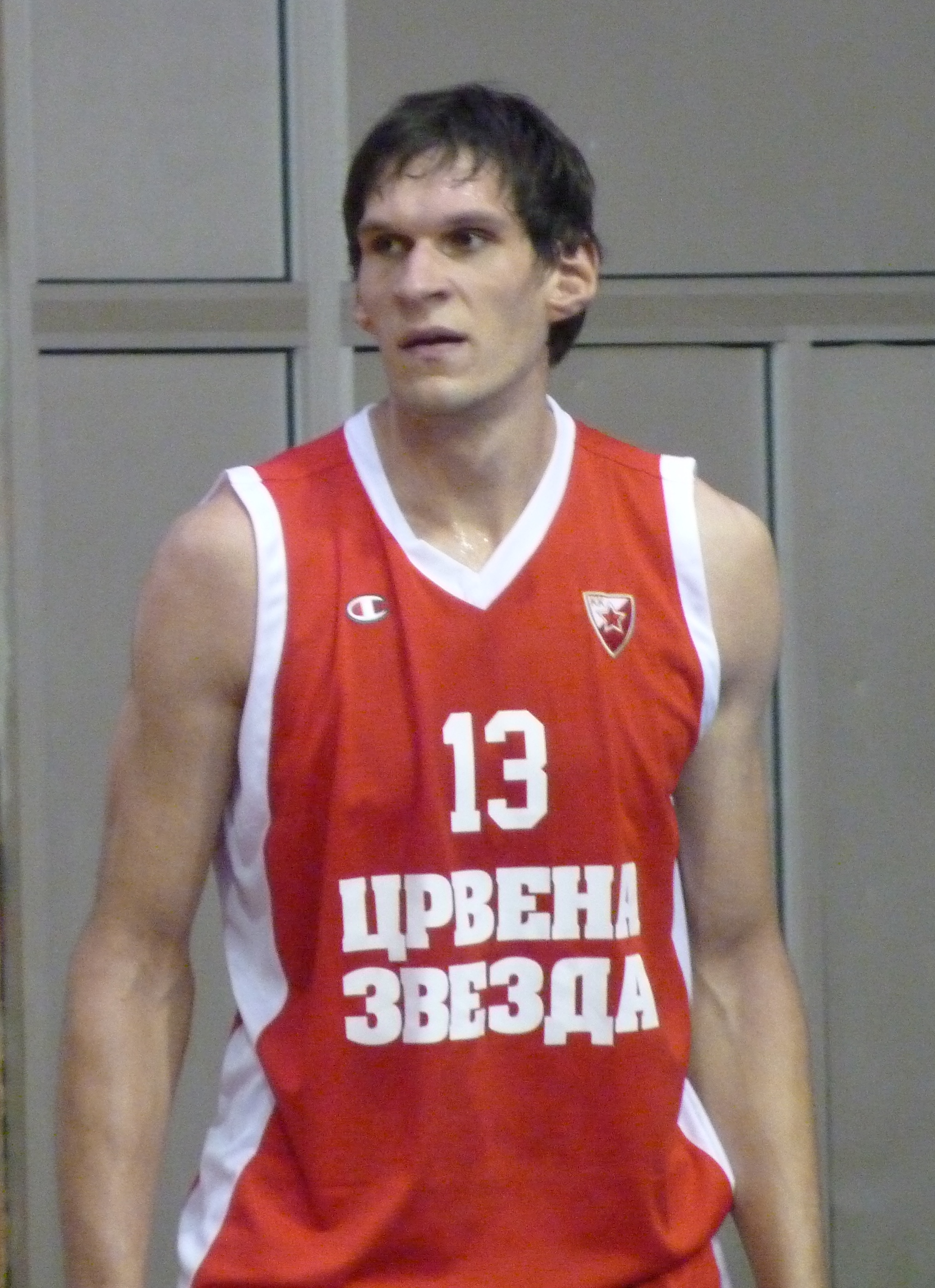
Boban Marjanović won the award three times in his career.

Season	Player	Team	Ref.
2006–07	(Serbia) Miloš Bojović	Sloga	
2007–08	(Serbia) Nikola Ilić	Borac Čačak	
2008–09	(Serbia) Novica Veličković	Partizan	
2009–10	(Serbia) Miroslav Raduljica	FMP	
2010–11	(Serbia) Marko Ljubičić	Metalac	
2011–12	(Serbia) Miloš Dimić	Radnički FMP	
2012–13	(Serbia) Boban Marjanović	Mega Vizura	
2013–14	(Serbia) Boban Marjanović (2)	Crvena zvezda	
2014–15	(Serbia) Boban Marjanović (3)	Crvena zvezda (2)	
2015–16	(Serbia) Aleksa Avramović	Borac Čačak (2)	
2016–17	(Serbia) Marko Čakarević	Dynamic	
2017–18	(United States) Nigel Williams-Goss	Partizan NIS	
2018–19	(Georgia (country)) Goga Bitadze	Mega Bemax (2)	
2019–20	Canceled due to COVID-19 pandemic in Serbia		
2020–21	Not awarded		
2021–22	Not awarded		
2022–23	Not awarded		
2023–24	Not awarded		
2024–25	Not awarded		

== Players with most awards ==
Player	Editions	Notes
(Serbia) Boban Marjanović	3	2013, 2014, 2015

== See also ==
- ABA League MVP
- Radivoj Korać Cup MVP Award
