= BLS First League MVP =

- Sport: Basketball
- Competition: First League of Serbia
- Awarded for: The best performance in the First League
- Location: Belgrade
- Country: Serbia
- Presented by: Basketball Federation of Serbia

History
- First award: 2007
- Editions: 16
- First winner: Miloš Bojović
- Most wins: Đukan Đukanović (2)
- Most recent: Dušan Kutlešić

The BLS First League MVP, or the Serbian First League MVP, is the award bestowed to the player that is deemed to be the "Most Valuable Player" during the first part of a season of the Basketball League of Serbia. The Basketball League of Serbia is the top-tier level national men's professional club basketball league in Serbia. The award has existed and been awarded by the Serbian League since the 2006–07 season.

== Winners ==
Season	Player	Team	Ref.
2006–07	(Serbia) Miloš Bojović	Sloga	
2007–08	(Serbia) Nikola Ilić	Borac Čačak	
2008–09	(Serbia) Uroš Mirković	Mašinac	
2009–10	(Serbia) Aleksandar Mladenović	Ergonom	
2010–11	(Serbia) Nenad Šulović	Napredak Rubin	
2011–12	(Serbia) Darko Balaban	Smederevo 1953	
2012–13	(Serbia) Boban Marjanović	Mega Vizura	
2013–14	(Serbia) Andrija Bojić	OKK Beograd	
2014–15	(Serbia) Vuk Malidžan	OKK Beograd (2)	
2015–16	(Serbia) Aleksa Avramović	Borac Čačak (2)	
2016–17	(Jamaica) Kimani Ffriend	Dynamic	
2017–18	(Serbia) Đukan Đukanović	Metalac	
2018–19	(Serbia) Đukan Đukanović (2)	Metalac (2)	
2019–20	(Serbia) Andrija Simović	Vojvodina	
2020–21	(Serbia) Đorđe Simeunović	Napredak Aleksinac	
2021–22	(Serbia) Dušan Kutlešić	Zlatibor	
2022–23			
2023–24			
2024–25			

== Players with most awards ==
Player	Editions	Notes
(Serbia) Đukan Đukanović	2	2018, 2019
