= Branko Lazić =

Serbian basketball player (born 1989)

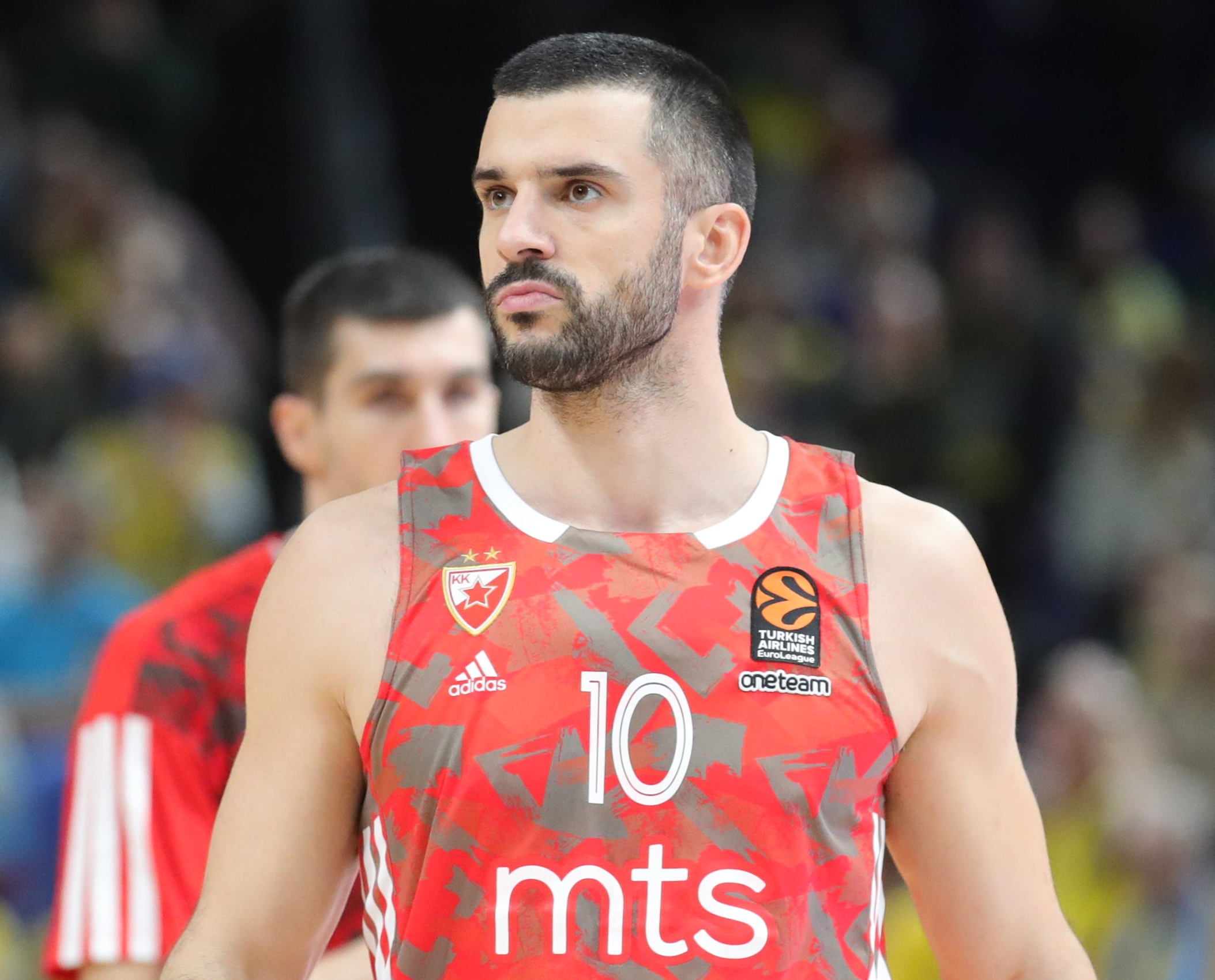
- Lazić with Crvena zvezda in November 2022.

Personal information
- Born: 12 January 1989 (age 37) Ljubovija, SR Serbia, Yugoslavia
- Listed height: 1.95 m (6 ft 5 in)
- Listed weight: 100 kg (220 lb)

Career information
- NBA draft: 2011: undrafted
- Playing career: 2007–2025
- Position: Small forward / shooting guard
- Number: 10

Career history
- 2007–2011: FMP
- 2011–2025: Crvena zvezda

Career highlights
- 7× ABA League champion (2015–2017, 2019, 2021, 2022, 2024); 9× Serbian League champion (2015–2019, 2021-2024); 9× Serbian Cup winner (2013–2015, 2017, 2021–2025; Adriatic Supercup winner (2018); 3× ABA League Defensive Player of the Year (2021, 2022, 2024)
Medals
Men's basketball
Representing Serbia
EuroBasket
Silver medal – second place	2017 Finland–Israel–Romania–Turkey
U18 European Championship
Gold medal – first place	2007 Spain	Team

Branko Lazić (Serbian Cyrillic: Бранко Лазић, pronounced [ˌbrǎːŋko ˈlǎːzit͜ɕ]; born 12 January 1989) is a Serbian former professional basketball player. He has also represented the senior Serbian national basketball team internationally. He has won a record seven ABA League titles.

== Professional career ==
=== FMP ===
Lazić started his professional career in 2007 with a Belgrade-based team FMP. He played four seasons there, until 2011.

=== Crvena zvezda ===
In 2011, Lazić signed a one-year contract with Crvena zvezda. On August 10, 2012, he signed a three-year extension with Crvena zvezda. On June 25, 2015, he signed a new two-year extension with Crvena zvezda.

On February 7, 2017, Lazić became third player with most appearances of all time for Crvena zvezda passing Vuk Radivojević and Dragiša Vučinić. On July 13, Lazić signed a new two-year contract with the club and became the team captain after departure of former team captain Luka Mitrović. On February 12, 2018, Lazić played in his 430th game, passed Slobodan Nikolić, and became the player with most appearances in the Crvena zvezda history. On March 3, 2019, in a 70–68 win over Partizan, Lazić played in his 500th game for the Zvezda. On June 24, 2019, Lazić signed a three-year extension with Crvena zvezda.

On January 18, 2021, Lazić made his 600th appearance for Crvena zvezda in a 79–77 win over Real Madrid. On December 19, 2021, Lazić passed Tadija Dragićević to become the Zvezda's ABA League all-time scoring leader.

Lazić was elected on 5-year term as a member of the Assembly of Crvena zvezda on 27 December 2021. In June 2022, he won his 20th major title with the Zvezda. On 13 July 2022, Lazić signed a two-year contract extension with the club.

In August 2025, Lazić was being famous for his political acts and opinions which made the club management to part ways with him after fourteen years, with whom he lifted 26 trophies.

In September 2026, at the ceremony celebrating the ABA League’s 25th anniversary, Lazić announced his retirement.

== National team career ==
In August 2017, head coach of the Serbia men's national basketball team Aleksandar Đorđević named Lazić as one of 12 players who represented Serbia at the EuroBasket 2017. They won the silver medal, after losing in the final game to Slovenia.

== Career achievements ==
- Serbian League champion: 9 (with Crvena zvezda: 2014–15, 2015–16, 2016–17, 2017–18, 2018–19, 2020–21, 2021–22, 2022–23, 2023–24)
- Radivoj Korać Cup winner: 8 (with Crvena zvezda: 2012–13, 2013–14, 2014–15, 2016–17, 2020–21, 2021–22, 2022–23, 2023–24)
- Adriatic League champion: 7 (with Crvena zvezda: 2014–15, 2015–16, 2016–17, 2018–19, 2020–21, 2021–22, 2023–24)
- Adriatic Supercup winner: 1 (with Crvena zvezda: 2018)

== Career statistics ==
Legend
GP	Games played	GS	Games started	MPG	Minutes per game
FG%	Field-goal percentage	3P%	3-point field-goal percentage	FT%	Free-throw percentage
RPG	Rebounds per game	APG	Assists per game	SPG	Steals per game
BPG	Blocks per game	PPG	Points per game	PIR	Performance index rating
**Bold**	Career high

=== EuroLeague ===
Year	Team	GP	GS	MPG	FG%	3P%	FT%	RPG	APG	SPG	BPG	PPG	PIR
2013–14	Crvena zvezda	10	8	14.3	**.474**	.429	.833	1.3	.7	.1	—	2.6	1.8
2014–15	Crvena zvezda	19	13	17.7	.394	.345	.750	1.5	.7	.6	**.1**	3.9	2.7
2015–16	Crvena zvezda	26	11	19.5	.430	.410	.875	1.3	**1.0**	.9	—	4.3	2.9
2016–17	Crvena zvezda	30	6	**23.6**	.467	.368	.571	**2.2**	.3	**1.4**	**.1**	**4.4**	**4.0**
2017–18	Crvena zvezda	30	21	20.4	.324	.259	**.944**	2.0	.9	.8	**.1**	3.3	2.5
2019–20	Crvena zvezda	25	**25**	16.2	.406	.292	.667	1.3	.6	.6	.0	3.9	1.8
2020–21	Crvena zvezda	**33**	23	16.3	.369	.354	.909	1.3	.7	.6	—	2.7	1.6
2021–22	Crvena zvezda	25	2	16.2	.373	.340	.864	1.0	.4	.3	**.1**	3.7	2.2
2022–23	Crvena zvezda	25	16	18.4	.471	**.500**	.600	1.2	.6	.6	.0	2.7	1.4
2023–24	Crvena zvezda	22	16	13.8	.322	.289	.917	1.5	.4	.4	.0	2.7	1.0
Career		245	141	18.0	.397	.345	.806	1.5	.6	.7	.1	3.5	2.3

=== EuroCup ===
Year	Team	GP	GS	MPG	FG%	3P%	FT%	RPG	APG	SPG	BPG	PPG	PIR
2007–08	FMP	7	1	12.6	.500	**.500**	.500	1.4	.4	.6	—	2.6	0.7
2008–09	FMP	3	1	8.3	.000	—	—	.3	—	—	—	0.0	-2.3
2012–13	Crvena zvezda	12	1	13.4	**.538**	.400	.778	1.1	.3	.3	—	3.8	**2.6**
2013–14	Crvena zvezda	11	8	**17.0**	.452	.421	**.800**	1.5	.6	**.7**	**.2**	**4.0**	2.3
2018–19	Crvena zvezda	**12**	**12**	16.7	.429	.350	.500	**1.8**	**.8**	.4	.1	3.2	1.8
Career		45	23	14.7	.462	.400	.722	1.4	.5	.5	.1	3.2	1.7

=== Domestic leagues ===
Year	Team	League	GP	MPG	FG%	3P%	FT%	RPG	APG	SPG	BPG	PPG
2007–08	(Serbia) FMP	KLS	14	18.4	.514	.467	.769	1.8	1.0	1.4	.1	3.9
2007–08	(Serbia) FMP	ABA	23	12.3	.543	.462	.692	1.0	.4	.9	—	2.3
2008–09	(Serbia) FMP	KLS	6	27.2	.400	.200	.692	2.5	.7	1.0	—	5.3
2008–09	(Serbia) FMP	ABA	24	18.8	.464	.444	.692	1.6	.5	.8	.2	3.5
2009–10	(Serbia) FMP	KLS	14	20.6	.455	.286	.750	2.6	.6	.9	.1	4.4
2009–10	(Serbia) FMP	ABA	24	18.5	.482	.341	.781	1.8	1.0	.4	.1	5.0
2010–11	(Serbia) FMP	KLS-FL	16	18.0	.506	.333	.850	3.6	.5	1.1	.1	6.5
2010–11	(Serbia) FMP	KLS	7	20.7	.500	.300	.750	2.7	.9	.6	—	8.6
2011–12	(Serbia) Crvena zvezda	KLS	21	13.5	.310	.326	.875	1.7	.3	.6	—	3.6
2011–12	(Serbia) Crvena zvezda	ABA	24	15.7	.400	.333	.688	1.1	.5	.7	.1	3.6
2012–13	(Serbia) Crvena zvezda	KLS	21	17.5	.391	.333	.762	1.9	.8	.4	.1	3.9
2012–13	(Serbia) Crvena zvezda	ABA	25	12.6	.469	.441	.800	1.5	.4	.8	—	3.6
2013–14	(Serbia) Crvena zvezda	KLS	16	19.1	.457	.408	.833	2.0	1.1	.6	.1	6.5
2013–14	(Serbia) Crvena zvezda	ABA	26	16.3	.379	.300	.680	1.7	.6	.5	.0	3.6
2014–15	(Serbia) Crvena zvezda	KLS	18	20.1	.426	.347	.759	2.3	.8	1.3	.1	6.9
2014–15	(Serbia) Crvena zvezda	ABA	28	16.8	.451	.408	.750	1.8	.6	.5	.0	4.2
2015–16	(Serbia) Crvena zvezda	KLS	12	19.9	.396	.357	.714	2.2	1.1	1.6	—	4.7
2015–16	(Serbia) Crvena zvezda	ABA	30	22.6	.450	.410	.806	1.7	1.3	1.3	.0	6.4
2016–17	(Serbia) Crvena zvezda	KLS	13	22.5	.464	.415	.833	2.4	1.4	1.0	.1	8.1
2016–17	(Serbia) Crvena zvezda	ABA	32	21.9	.410	.363	.863	2.3	1.2	1.3	.2	5.7
2017–18	(Serbia) Crvena zvezda	KLS	17	19.9	.430	.345	.778	3.3	1.5	.7	—	5.9
2017–18	(Serbia) Crvena zvezda	ABA	26	19.1	.395	.354	.778	2.1	.9	.8	.1	3.8
2018–19	(Serbia) Crvena zvezda	KLS	15	18.0	.464	.370	.867	.9	.9	.9	.1	6.3
2018–19	(Serbia) Crvena zvezda	ABA	25	14.7	.414	.378	.786	1.4	.4	.6	.0	3.9
2019–20	(Serbia) Crvena zvezda	ABA	17	19.5	.550	.439	.905	1.5	.6	1.1	—	6.1
2020–21	(Serbia) Crvena zvezda	KLS	7	19.2	.556	.500	1.000	1.6	1.0	.6	—	5.9
2020–21	(Serbia) Crvena zvezda	ABA	27	19.2	.489	.507	.833	2.0	.5	1.0	.0	5.1
2021–22	(Serbia) Crvena zvezda	KLS	5	20.8	.464	.316	.750	1.4	.6	—	—	7.0
2021–22	(Serbia) Crvena zvezda	ABA	23	17.7	.410	.380	.769	1.9	.6	.7	—	5.8
2022–23	(Serbia) Crvena zvezda	KLS	2	12.8	.250	.250	—	1.0	.5	1.0	—	1.5
2022–23	(Serbia) Crvena zvezda	ABA	29	16.1	.376	.382	.818	1.3	.8	.8	.1	3.9
2023–24	(Serbia) Crvena zvezda	KLS	3	15.4	.000	.000	.500	2.0	—	—	—	1.3
2023–24	(Serbia) Crvena zvezda	ABA	24	15.6	.387	.371	.857	1.4	.5	.7	—	5.5

== See also ==
- KK Crvena zvezda accomplishments and records
- List of KK Crvena zvezda players with 100 games played
- List of Serbia men's national basketball team players

Sporting positions
Preceded by Luka Mitrović	Crvena zvezda captain 2017–2025	Succeeded by Ognjen Dobrić
