= 2012–13 Basketball League of Serbia =

- League: Basketball League of Serbia
- Sport: Basketball
- Duration: October 6, 2012 – March 16, 2013
- TV partner: RTS

First League
- Season champions: Vojvodina
- Season MVP: (Serbia) Boban Marjanović (Mega Vizura)

Super League
- Season champions: Partizan
- Season MVP: (Serbia) Boban Marjanović (Mega Vizura)

Playoff stage
- Finals champions: Partizan
- Runners-up: Crvena zvezda
- Finals MVP: (Serbia) Dragan Milosavljević (Partizan)

Basketball League of Serbia seasons
- ← 2011–12 2013–14 →

The 2012–13 Basketball League of Serbia season is the 7th season of the Basketball League of Serbia, the highest professional basketball league in Serbia. It is also 69th national championship played by Serbian clubs inclusive of nation's previous incarnations as Yugoslavia and Serbia & Montenegro.

The first half of the season consists of 14 teams and 182-game regular season (26 games for each of the 14 teams) began on Saturday, October 8, 2012 and will end on Sunday, March 16, 2013. The second half of the season consists of 3 teams from Adriatic League and the best 5 teams from first half of the season. The first half is called First League and second is called Super League.

== Teams for 2012–13 season ==
Location of teams in the 2012–13 Basketball League of Serbia

| Team | City | Arena | Capacity | Head coach |
|---|---|---|---|---|
| BKK Radnički | Belgrade | SC Šumice | 1.000 | Dragan Nikolić |
| Borac | Čačak | Borac Sports Hall | 2.000 | Raško Bojić |
| Crvena Zvezda Telekom | Belgrade | Pionir Hall | 8.150 | Vlada Vukoičić |
| Jagodina | Jagodina | JASSA Sports Center | 2.500 | Ivo Smiljanić |
| Konstantin | Niš | Čair Sports Center | 4.800 | Boško Đokić |
| Mega Vizura | Belgrade | Kruševac Sports Hall | 2.500 | Dejan Milojević |
| Metalac | Valjevo | Valjevo Sports Hall | 1.500 | Milovan Stepandić |
| OKK Beograd | Belgrade | SC Šumice | 1.000 | Vlade Đurović |
| Partizan mt:s | Belgrade | Pionir Hall | 8.150 | Duško Vujošević |
| Radnički FMP | Belgrade | FMP Hall | 2.500 | Miloš Pejić |
| Radnički Kragujevac | Kragujevac | Hala Jezero | 3.500 | Miroslav Nikolić |
| Sloboda | Užice | Veliki Park Sports Hall | 2.200 | Vladimir Đokić |
| Sloga | Kraljevo | Kraljevo Sports Hall | 1.500 | Zoran Milovanović |
| Smederevo 1953 | Smederevo | Sports Hall Smederevo | 3.000 | Zoran Todorović |
| Tamiš | Pančevo | Strelište Sports Hall | 1.100 | Bojan Jovičić |
| Vojvodina Srbijagas | Novi Sad | SPC Vojvodina | 1.100 | Siniša Matić |
| Vršac | Vršac | Millennium Center | 4.400 | Oliver Popović |

| Teams from Adriatic League |
| Teams from Balkan International Basketball league |

== First League ==
=== Standings ===
| | Team | Pld | W | L | PF | PA | Diff | Pts |
|---|---|---|---|---|---|---|---|---|
| 1 | Vojvodina Srbijagas | 26 | 20 | 6 | 2222 | 1967 | +255 | 46 |
| 2 | Mega Vizura | 26 | 20 | 6 | 2305 | 2068 | +237 | 46 |
| 3 | Metalac | 26 | 16 | 10 | 1981 | 1933 | +48 | 42 |
| 4 | Konstantin | 26 | 15 | 11 | 1899 | 1789 | +110 | 41 |
| 5 | Sloboda | 26 | 15 | 11 | 1987 | 1971 | +16 | 41 |
| 6 | Vršac | 26 | 14 | 12 | 2136 | 2130 | +6 | 40 |
| 7 | Radnički FMP | 26 | 14 | 12 | 1981 | 1893 | +88 | 40 |
| 8 | Borac | 26 | 13 | 13 | 1942 | 1957 | –15 | 39 |
| 9 | OKK Beograd | 26 | 12 | 14 | 2134 | 2156 | –22 | 38 |
| 10 | Tamiš | 26 | 11 | 15 | 1926 | 1921 | +5 | 37 |
| 11 | Smederevo 1953 | 26 | 10 | 16 | 1960 | 2030 | –70 | 36 |
| 12 | Sloga | 26 | 9 | 17 | 2041 | 2223 | –182 | 35 |
| 13 | BKK Radnički | 26 | 8 | 18 | 1944 | 2074 | –130 | 34 |
| 14 | Jagodina | 26 | 5 | 21 | 1888 | 2234 | –346 | 31 |

| Qualified for Super League |
| Relegation to B League |

Pld – Played; W – Won; L – Lost; PF – Points for; PA – Points against; Diff – Difference; Pts – Points.

As of 23 March 2013

=== Schedule and results ===
1. round
| Mega Vizura – Borac | 87–71 |
| Vršac – Vojvodina | 82–91 |
| Konstantin – Tamiš | 73–63 |
| Smederevo 1953 – Radnički FMP | 75–80 |
| Jagodina – OKK Beograd | 81–63 |
| BKK Radnički – Metalac | 82–84 |
| Sloga – Sloboda | 58–63 |

2. round
| Borac – Sloboda | 64–65 |
| Metalac – Sloga | 74–59 |
| OKK Beograd – BKK Radnički | 71–93 |
| Radnički FMP – Jagodina | 95–87 |
| Tamiš – Smederevo 1953 | 88–71 |
| Vojvodina – Konstantin | 83–67 |
| Mega Vizura – Vršac | 92–81 |

3. round
| Vršac – Borac | 78–72 |
| Konstantin – Mega Vizura | 89–71 |
| Smederevo 1953 – Vojvodina | 71–80 |
| Jagodina – Tamiš | 70–72 |
| BKK Radnički – Radnički FMP | 79–75 |
| Sloga – OKK Beograd | 85–91 |
| Sloboda – Metalac | 81–72 |

4. round
| Borac – Metalac | 69-39 |
| OKK Beograd – Sloboda | 92-88 |
| Radnički FMP – Sloga | 89-64 |
| Tamiš – BKK Radnički | 76-69 |
| Vojvodina – Jagodina | 101-70 |
| Mega Vizura – Smederevo 1953 | 91-75 |
| Vršac – Konstantin | 72-71 |

5. round
| Konstantin – Borac | 68-51 |
| Smederevo 1953 – Vršac | 75-77 |
| Jagodina – Mega Vizura | 74-94 |
| BKK Radnički – Vojvodina | 72-87 |
| Sloga – Tamiš | 83-79 |
| Sloboda – Radnički FMP | 70-61 |
| Metalac – OKK Beograd | 78-75 |

6. round
| Borac – OKK Beograd | 82–80 |
| Radnički FMP – Metalac | 77–59 |
| Tamiš – Sloboda | 93–68 |
| Vojvodina – Sloga | 101–73 |
| Mega Vizura – BKK Radnički | 84–79 |
| Vršac – Jagodina | 83–73 |
| Konstantin – Smederevo 1953 | 74–84 |

7. round
| Smederevo 1953 – Borac | 69–64 |
| Jagodina – Konstantin | 61–55 |
| BKK Radnički – Vršac | 77–89 |
| Sloga – Mega Vizura | 93–94 |
| Sloboda – Vojvodina | 90–88 |
| Metalac – Tamiš | 69–54 |
| OKK Beograd – Radnički FMP | 74–73 |

8. round
| Borac – Radnički FMP | 96–90 |
| Tamiš – OKK Beograd | 74–81 |
| Vojvodina – Metalac | 75–73 |
| Mega Vizura – Sloboda | 100–81 |
| Vršac – Sloga | 95–81 |
| Konstantin – BKK Radnički | 70–50 |
| Smederevo 1953 – Jagodina | 69–71 |

9. round
| Jagodina – Borac | 80–82 |
| BKK Radnički – Smederevo 1953 | 79–59 |
| Sloga – Konstantin | 72–77 |
| Sloboda – Vršac | 76–69 |
| Metalac – Mega Vizura | 87–89 |
| OKK Beograd – Vojvodina | 78–96 |
| Radnički FMP – Tamiš | 68–67 |

10. round
| Borac – Tamiš | 61–58 |
| Vojvodina – Radnički FMP | 101–59 |
| Mega Vizura – OKK Beograd | 107–80 |
| Vršac – Metalac | 65–75 |
| Konstantin – Sloboda | 89–66 |
| Smederevo 1953 – Sloga | 79–67 |
| Jagodina – BKK Radnički | 68–79 |

11. round
| BKK Radnički – Borac | 90–86 |
| Sloga – Jagodina | 87–77 |
| Sloboda – Smederevo 1953 | 84–80 |
| Metalac – Konstantin | 73–70 |
| OKK Beograd – Vršac | 122–113 |
| Radnički FMP – Mega Vizura | 83–86 |
| Tamiš – Vojvodina | 93–78 |

12. round
| Borac – Vojvodina | 79–70 |
| Mega Vizura – Tamiš | 93–75 |
| Vršac – Radnički FMP | 84–77 |
| Konstantin – OKK Beograd | 79–70 |
| Smederevo 1953 – Metalac | 76–86 |
| Jagodina – Sloboda | 88–69 |
| BKK Radnički – Sloga | 90–76 |

13. round
| Sloga – Borac | 101–83 |
| Sloboda – BKK Radnički | 73–68 |
| Metalac – Jagodina | 95–63 |
| OKK Beograd – Smederevo 1953 | 77–90 |
| Radnički FMP – Konstantin | 74–56 |
| Tamiš – Vršac | 77–82 |
| Vojvodina – Mega Vizura | 88–76 |

14. round
| Borac – Mega Vizura | 89–84 |
| Vojvodina – Vršac | 102–79 |
| Tamiš – Konstantin | 70–63 |
| Radnički FMP – Smederevo 1953 | 70–77 |
| OKK Beograd – Jagodina | 79–67 |
| Metalac – BKK Radnički | 75–68 |
| Sloboda – Sloga | 84–69 |

15. round
| Sloboda – Borac | 75–69 |
| Sloga – Metalac | 90–87 |
| BKK Radnički – OKK Beograd | 76–101 |
| Jagodina – Radnički FMP | 55–95 |
| Smederevo 1953 – Tamiš | 71–62 |
| Konstantin – Vojvodina | 79–76 |
| Vršac – Mega Vizura | 89–100 |

16. round
| Borac – Vršac | 81–61 |
| Mega Vizura – Konstantin | 86–70 |
| Vojvodina – Smederevo 1953 | 103–78 |
| Tamiš – Jagodina | 76–56 |
| Radnički FMP – BKK Radnički | 75–61 |
| OKK Beograd – Sloga | 109–66 |
| Metalac – Sloboda | 77–73 |

17. round
| Metalac – Borac | 76–56 |
| Sloboda – OKK Beograd | 83–68 |
| Sloga – Radnički FMP | 81–69 |
| BKK Radnički – Tamiš | 80–83 |
| Jagodina – Vojvodina | 76–95 |
| Smederevo 1953 – Mega Vizura | 73–89 |
| Konstantin – Vršac | 71–61 |

18. round
| Borac – Konstantin | 68–75 |
| Vršac – Smederevo 1953 | 72–65 |
| Mega Vizura – Jagodina | 113–76 |
| Vojvodina – BKK Radnički | 82–74 |
| Tamiš – Sloga | 79–82 |
| Radnički FMP – Sloboda | 81–61 |
| OKK Beograd – Metalac | 71–77 |

19. round
| OKK Beograd – Borac | 85–60 |
| Metalac – Radnički FMP | 79–71 |
| Sloboda – Tamiš | 67–73 |
| Sloga – Vojvodina | 72–74 |
| BKK Radnički – Mega Vizura | 64–94 |
| Jagodina – Vršac | 87–101 |
| Smederevo 1953 – Konstantin | 62–59 |

20. round
| Borac – Smederevo 1953 | 81–77 |
| Konstantin – Jagodina | 100–49 |
| Vršac – BKK Radnički | 98–69 |
| Mega Vizura – Sloga | 102–70 |
| Vojvodina – Sloboda | 85–78 |
| Tamiš – Metalac | 84–69 |
| Radnički FMP – OKK Beograd | 84–76 |

21. round
| Radnički FMP – Borac | 79–62 |
| OKK Beograd – Tamiš | 76–72 |
| Metalac – Vojvodina | 70–67 |
| Sloboda – Mega Vizura | 80–55 |
| Sloga – Vršac | 104–93 |
| BKK Radnički – Konstantin | 66–74 |
| Jagodina – Smederevo 1953 | 90–74 |

22. round
| Borac – Jagodina | 78–52 |
| Smederevo 1953 – BKK Radnički | 66–70 |
| Konstantin – Sloga | 91–77 |
| Vršac – Sloboda | 79–73 |
| Mega Vizura – Metalac | 95–79 |
| Vojvodina – OKK Beograd | 86–79 |
| Tamiš – Radnički FMP | 55–68 |

23. round
| Tamiš – Borac | 72–76 |
| Radnički FMP – Vojvodina | 67–68 |
| OKK Beograd – Mega Vizura | 90–84 |
| Metalac – Vršac | 87–76 |
| Sloboda – Konstantin | 80–68 |
| Sloga – Smederevo 1953 | 70–74 |
| BKK Radnički – Jagodina | 78–77 |

24. round
| Borac – BKK Radnički | 91–84 |
| Jagodina – Sloga | 87–98 |
| Smederevo 1953 – Sloboda | 87–69 |
| Konstantin – Metalac | 76–73 |
| Vršac – OKK Beograd | 95–84 |
| Mega Vizura – Radnički FMP | 81–74 |
| Vojvodina – Tamiš | 83–84 |

25. round
| Vojvodina – Borac | 85–72 |
| Tamiš – Mega Vizura | 81–82 |
| Radnički FMP – Vršac | 82–80 |
| OKK Beograd – Konstantin | 66–76 |
| Metalac – Smederevo 1953 | 81–92 |
| Sloboda – Jagodina | 116–74 |
| Sloga – BKK Radnički | 86–83 |

26. round
| Borac – Sloga | 99–77 |
| BKK Radnički – Sloboda | 64–74 |
| Jagodina – Metalac | 79–87 |
| Smederevo 1953 – OKK Beograd | 91–96 |
| Konstantin – Radnički FMP | 59–65 |
| Vršac – Tamiš | 82–66 |
| Mega Vizura – Vojvodina | 76–77 |

== Super League ==
As of 25 May 2013

=== Standings ===
| Pos | Team | Total | | | | | | |
| Pos | Team | P | W | L | F | A | D | Pts |
|---|---|---|---|---|---|---|---|---|
| 1 | Partizan mt:s | 14 | 12 | 2 | 1195 | 935 | +260 | 26 |
| 2 | Crvena zvezda Telekom | 14 | 11 | 3 | 1143 | 1015 | +128 | 25 |
| 3 | Mega Vizura | 14 | 9 | 5 | 1142 | 1104 | +38 | 23 |
| 4 | Vojvodina Srbijagas | 14 | 8 | 6 | 1113 | 1074 | +39 | 22 |
| 5 | Radnički Kragujevac | 14 | 7 | 7 | 1112 | 1064 | +48 | 21 |
| 6 | Metalac Koteks | 14 | 4 | 10 | 1064 | 1112 | -48 | 18 |
| 7 | Sloboda Užice | 14 | 4 | 10 | 938 | 1223 | -285 | 18 |
| 8 | Konstantin | 14 | 1 | 13 | 923 | 1103 | -180 | 15 |

P=Matches played, W=Matches won, L=Matches lost, F=Points for, A=Points against, D=Points difference, Pts=Points

| Qualification for Adriatic League |

=== Schedule and results ===
1. round
| Vojvodina Srbijagas – Metalac | 81–77 |
| Sloboda – Crvena zvezda | 66–97 |
| Partizan – Mega Vizura | 95–64 |
| Konstantin – Radnički | 73–90 |

2. round
| Metalac – Radnički | 91–93 |
| Mega Vizura – Konstantin | 85–73 |
| Crvena zvezda – Partizan | 67–77 |
| Vojvodina Srbijagas – Sloboda | 91–65 |

3. round
| Sloboda – Metalac | 90–88 |
| Partizan – Vojvodina Srbijagas | 88–59 |
| Crvena zvezda – Konstantin | 96–71 |
| Radnički – Mega Vizura | 69–77 |

== Playoff stage ==
=== Semifinals ===
Game 1

28 May 2013
19:00

| Partizan mt:s | 79–54 | Vojvodina Srbijagas |
Scoring by quarter: 21–18, 19–11, 23–12, 16–13
| Pts: Bertāns 22; Rebs: Musli 11; Asts: Lauvergne 6 | | Pts: Marković 11; Rebs: Marković 8 Asts: Boltić 5 |
Partizan leads 1–0

Pionir Hall
Belgrade, Serbia
Attendance: 3,000
Referees: Belošević Ilija, Nikolić Uroš, Stefanović Ivan

29 May 2013
21:00

| Crvena zvezda Telekom | 78–61 | Mega Vizura |
Scoring by quarter: 21–14, 17–23, 19–16, 21–8
| Pts: Simonović 18; Rebs: Savović 18; Asts: Nelson 9 | | Pts: Veličković 14; Rebs: Marjanović, Micić 5 Asts: Micić 5 |
Crvena zvezda leads 1–0

Pionir Hall
Belgrade, Serbia
Attendance: 7,000
Referees: Maričić Saša, Juras Marko, Obrknežević Uroš

Game 2

30 May 2013
21:00

| Vojvodina Srbijagas | 61–82 | Partizan mt:s |
Scoring by quarter: 13–29, 16–17, 14–18, 18–18
| Pts: Zeković 16; Rebs: Marković 8 Asts: Čović 5 | | Pts: Lauvergne 20; Rebs: Lauvergne 11; Asts: Six players 2 |
Partizan won 2–0

SC Slana Bara
Novi Sad, Serbia
Attendance: 1,300
Referees: Maričić Saša, Jevtović Vladimir, Obrknežević Uroš

31 May 2013
21:00

| Mega Vizura | 73–71 | Crvena zvezda Telekom |
Scoring by quarter: 17–16, 13–13, 19–18, 24–24
| Pts: Marjanović 16; Rebs: Marjanović 15; Asts: Micić 7 | | Pts: Simonović 20; Rebs: Four players 6 Asts: Nelson 3 |
Series tied at 1–1

Kruševac Sports Hall
Kruševac, Serbia
Attendance: 2,500
Referees: Belošević Ilija, Nikolić Uroš, Glišić Aleksandar

Game 3

2 June 2013
21:00

| Crvena zvezda Telekom | 77–68 | Mega Vizura |
Scoring by quarter: 20–24, 16–19, 17–11, 24–14
| Pts: Nelson 20; Rebs: Savović 10; Asts: Nelson 6 | | Pts: Marjanović 21; Rebs: Marjanović 10; Asts: Micić 4 |
Crvena zvezda won 2–1

Pionir Hall
Belgrade, Serbia
Attendance: 7,000
Referees: Nešković Dragan, Jevtović Vladimir, Ninković Nemanja

=== Final ===
Game 1

5 June 2013
19:00

| Partizan mt:s | 82–54 | Crvena zvezda Telekom |
Scoring by quarter: 23–16, 20–12, 17–20, 22–6
| Pts: Milosavljević 28; Rebs: Lauvergne 8 Asts: Westermann, Gordić 3 | | Pts: Katić 19; Rebs: Katić, Nelson 5 Asts: Lazić 2 |
Partizan leads 1–0

Pionir Hall
Belgrade, Serbia
Attendance: 5,500
Referees: Nešković Dragan, Maričić Saša, Nikolić Uroš

Game 2

7 June 2013
19:00

| Crvena zvezda Telekom | 69–71 | Partizan mt:s |
Scoring by quarter: 22–16, 21–17, 11–19, 15–19
| Pts: Simonović, Katić 17; Rebs: Savović 10; Asts: Nelson 8 | | Pts: Bertāns 13; Rebs: Bertāns 6 Asts: Milosavljević 4 |
Partizan leads 2–0

Pionir Hall
Belgrade, Serbia
Attendance: 5,500
Referees: Belošević Ilija, Jovčić Milivoje, Obrknežević Uroš

Game 3

10 June 2013
19:00

| Partizan mt:s | 74–81 | Crvena zvezda Telekom |
Scoring by quarter: 24–20, 15–19, 22–21, 13–21
| Pts: Lučić 26; Rebs: Lauvergne 7 Asts: Musli 3 | | Pts: Rakočević 18; Rebs: Scott 9 Asts: Katić, Radivojević 3 |
Partizan leads 2–1

Pionir Hall
Belgrade, Serbia
Attendance: 6,000
Referees: Vojinović Milija, Juras Marko, Jevtović Vladimir

Game 4

12 June 2013
20:00

| Crvena zvezda Telekom | 52–68 | Partizan mt:s |
Scoring by quarter: 11–15, 10–19, 12–16, 19–18
| Pts: Nelson 12; Rebs: Scott 5 Asts: Radivojević 4 | | Pts: Bogdanović 17; Rebs: Lauvergne 11; Asts: Westermann 4 |
Partizan won 3–1

Pionir Hall
Belgrade, Serbia
Attendance: 6,500
Referees: Belošević Ilija, Maričić Saša, Nikolić Uroš

=== Bracket ===
Semifinals
1 | Partizan mt:s | 2
4 | Vojvodina Srbijagas | 0
2 | Crvena zvezda Telekom | 2
3 | Mega Vizura | 1

Final
1 | Partizan mt:s | 3
2 | Crvena zvezda Telekom | 1

2012–13 Basketball League of Serbia Champions

Partizan
20th Title

== Stats leaders ==
=== MVP Round by Round ===
First League

| Round | Player | Team | Efficiency |
|---|---|---|---|
| 1 | (Serbia) Boban Marjanović | Mega Vizura | 40 |
| 2 | (Serbia) Vuksan Gagović | Jagodina | 33 |
| 3 | (Montenegro) Nemanja Radović | Vršac | 33 |
| 4 | (Serbia) Dejan Burić | Tamiš | 33 |
| 5 | (Montenegro) Nemanja Radović (2) | Vršac | 45 |
| 6 | (Serbia) Mlađen Šljivančanin | Borac | 41 |
| 7 | (Serbia) Marko Popović | Sloga | 34 |
| 8 | (Serbia) Boban Marjanović (2) | Mega Vizura | 46 |
| 9 | (Serbia) Stanoje Knežević | OKK Beograd | 37 |
| 10 | (Serbia) Boban Marjanović (3) | Mega Vizura | 37 |
| 11 | (Serbia) Boban Marjanović (4) | Mega Vizura | 43 |
| 12 | (Serbia) Boban Marjanović (5) | Mega Vizura | 36 |
| 13 | (Serbia) Saša Mijailović | Sloga | 37 |
| 14 | (Serbia) Boban Marjanović (6) | Mega Vizura | 50 |
| 15 | (Serbia) Boban Marjanović (7) | Mega Vizura | 35 |
| 16 | (Serbia) Rajko Kljajević | Jagodina | 39 |
| 17 | (Serbia) Marko Popović (2) | Sloga | 32 |
| 17 | (Serbia) Slavko Stefanović | Sloboda | 32 |
| 18 | (Serbia) Boban Marjanović (8) | Mega Vizura | 36 |
| 19 | (Serbia) Marko Popović (3) | Sloga | 33 |
| 20 | (Serbia) Boban Marjanović (9) | Mega Vizura | 34 |
| 20 | (Montenegro) Maksim Šturanović | Radnički FMP | 34 |
| 21 | (Serbia) Aleksandar Marelja | Sloga | 31 |
| 22 | (Serbia) Boban Marjanović (10) | Mega Vizura | 41 |
| 23 | (Serbia) Nikola Jevtović | Sloboda | 39 |
| 24 | (Serbia) Boban Marjanović (11) | Mega Vizura | 32 |
| 24 | (Serbia) Aleksandar Marelja (2) | Sloga | 32 |
| 25 | (Montenegro) Bojan Bakić | Metalac | 38 |
| 26 | (Serbia) Miljan Radisavljević | Borac | 37 |

Super League

| Round | Player | Team | Efficiency |
|---|---|---|---|
| 1 | (Serbia) Bogdan Bogdanović | Partizan | 29 |
| 2 | (Montenegro) Bojan Bakić | Metalac Valjevo | 42 |
| 3 | (Serbia) Boban Marjanović | Mega Vizura | 38 |
| 4 | (Serbia) Boban Marjanović (2) | Mega Vizura | 29 |
| 5 | (Serbia) Igor Rakočević | Crvena zvezda | 27 |
| 6 | (Montenegro) Bojan Bakić (2) | Metalac Valjevo | 33 |
| 7 | (Serbia) Igor Rakočević (2) | Crvena Zvezda | 39 |
| 8 | (Serbia) Novica Veličković | Mega Vizura | 31 |
| 9 | (Serbia) Boban Marjanović (3) | Mega Vizura | 28 |
| 10 | (Serbia) Novica Veličković (2) | Mega Vizura | 43 |
| 11 | (Serbia) Boban Marjanović (4) | Mega Vizura | 49 |
| 12 | (Latvia) Dāvis Bertāns | Partizan | 27 |
| 13 | (Serbia) Boban Marjanović (5) | Mega Vizura | 25 |
| 14 | (United States) DeMarcus Nelson | Crvena zvezda | 25 |

Play off

| Round | Player | Team | Efficiency |
|---|---|---|---|
| 1 | (Serbia) Boris Savović | Crvena zvezda | 33 |
| 2 | (Serbia) Boban Marjanović | Mega Vizura | 33 |
| 3 | (Serbia) Boban Marjanović (2) | Mega Vizura | 31 |
| 4 | (Serbia) Dragan Milosavljević | Partizan | 29 |
| 5 | (Serbia) Boris Savović (2) | Crvena zvezda | 22 |
| 6 | (Serbia) Vladimir Lučić | Partizan | 30 |
| 7 | (France) Joffrey Lauvergne | Partizan | 24 |
