= 2015–16 Basketball League of Serbia =

- Duration: October 2, 2015 – June 9, 2016
- Teams: 18 (Note: Four teams (Crvena zvedza, Partizan, Mega Vizura & Metalac) will only play starting from the second half of the season.)
- TV partners: RTS; Arena Sport

Finals
- Champions: Crvena zvezda (17th title)
- Runners-up: Partizan

The 2015–16 Basketball League of Serbia season is the 10th season of the Basketball League of Serbia, the highest professional basketball league in Serbia. It is also 72nd national championship played by Serbian clubs inclusive of nation's previous incarnations as Yugoslavia and Serbia & Montenegro.

The first half of the season consists of 14 teams and 182-game regular season (26 games for each of the 14 teams) began on October 2, 2015, and will end on March 26, 2016. The second half of the season consists of 4 teams from Adriatic League and the best 4 teams from first half of the season. Playoff starts soon after. The first half is called First League and second is called Super League.

== Teams for 2015–16 season ==
Location of teams in the 2015–16 Basketball League of Serbia

Team	City	Arena	Capacity	Head coach
Spartak	Subotica	SC Dudova Šuma	3.000	Predrag Borilović
Borac Mozzart Sport	Čačak	Hala kraj Morave	2.000	Raško Bojić
Crvena Zvezda Telekom	Belgrade	Hall Aleksandar Nikolić	8.150	Dejan Radonjić
Napredak Rubin	Kruševac	Kruševac Sports Hall	2.500	Boško Đokić
Beovuk 72	Belgrade	Vizura Sport Center	1.500	
Mladost	Zemun	Pinki Hall	2.300	
Konstantin	Niš	Čair Sports Center	5.000	Marko Cvetković
Mega Vizura	Belgrade	Sports Hall Pinki	3.000	Dejan Milojević
Metalac Farmakom	Valjevo	Valjevo Sports Hall	1.500	Vladimir Đokić
OKK Beograd	Belgrade	SC Šumice	2.000	Vlade Đurović
Partizan NIS	Belgrade	Hall Aleksandar Nikolić	8.150	Aleksandar Džikić
FMP	Belgrade	Železnik Hall	2.000	Milan Gurović
Jagodina	Jagodina	JASSA Sports Center	2.600	Aleksandar Ićić
Sloga	Kraljevo	New Ribnica hall	3.350	
Smederevo 1953	Smederevo	Sports Hall Smederevo	2.600	Zoran Todorović
Tamiš	Pančevo	Strelište Sports Hall	1.100	Darko Jovičić
Vojvodina Srbijagas	Novi Sad	SPC Vojvodina	1.100	Dušan Alimpijević
Vršac Swisslion	Vršac	Millennium Center	5.000	Oliver Popović

Teams that play in the 2015–16 Adriatic League

== First League ==
=== Standings ===
Pos	Team	Pld	W	L	PF	PA	PD	Qualification or relegation
1	FMP	26	24	2	2230	1658	+572	Super League
2	Borac	26	18	8	2172	2017	+155	Super League
3	Konstantin	26	17	9	2077	2052	+25	Super League
4	Tamiš	26	15	11	1970	1841	+129	Super League
5	Mladost Admiral	26	15	11	2041	1926	+115	
6	Napredak Rubin	26	13	13	1886	1909	−23	
7	Beovuk 72	26	13	13	2048	2060	−12	
8	Spartak	26	12	14	1988	1977	+11	
9	Sloga	26	12	14	1838	1986	−148	
10	Vršac Swisslion	26	11	15	2004	2014	−10	
11	Smederevo 1953	26	11	15	1955	2014	−59	
12	OKK Beograd	26	9	17	2035	2090	−55	
13	Vojvodina Srbijagas	26	9	17	1850	2049	−199	Relegated
14	Jagodina	26	3	23	1804	2305	−501	Relegated

== Super League ==
=== Group A ===
Pos	Team	Pld	W	L	PF	PA	PD	Qualification	CZV	FMP	MET	TAM
1	Crvena Zvezda	6	6	0	531	384	+147	Playoff stage		72–67	102–67	94–54
2	FMP	6	4	2	484	439	+45	Playoff stage	83–91		92–78	78–53
3	Metalac	6	2	4	475	508	−33		56–78	80–84		104–85
4	Tamiš	6	0	6	381	540	−159		57–94	65–80	67–90	

=== Group B ===
Pos	Team	Pld	W	L	PF	PA	PD	Qualification	PAR	MEG	KON	BOR
1	Partizan	6	6	0	550	467	+83	Playoff stage		94–89	89–73	102–79
2	Mega Leks	6	4	2	578	480	+98	Playoff stage	81–85		93–64	102–74
3	Konstantin	6	1 (Note: Tie 1–1 (+1))	5	440	538	−98		62–86	75–104		89–75
4	Borac	6	1 (Note: Tie 1–1 (–1))	5	491	574	−83		83–94	89–109	91–78	

== Playoff stage ==
Semifinals
1A	Crvena Zvezda	77	74
2B	Mega Leks	66	64
1B	Partizan	82	74	87
2A	FMP	63	79	78

Finals
Crvena Zvezda	84	87	72	70
Partizan	53	86	75	65

2015–16 Basketball League of Serbia champions

17th title

=== 3rd place series for 2016–17 ABA League ===
3rd place
1	Mega Leks	93	83	83	90	81
2	FMP	77	89	84	79	73

==== Semifinals ====
27 May 2016
19:00

Crvena Zvezda	77–66	Mega Leks
Scoring by quarter: 21–18, 22–12, 13–12, 21–24
Pts: Simonović 14; Rebs: Zirbes 8 Asts: Jović 8		Pts: Zagorac 20; Rebs: Zagorac 11; Asts: Ivanović 5

Belgrade
Attendance: 2,479
Referees: Belošević, Glišić, Jevtović

28 May 2016
18:00

Partizan	82–63	FMP
Scoring by quarter: 12–16, 25–11, 26–14, 19–22
Pts: Murić 14; Rebs: Cvetković 6 Asts: Cvetković, Murić 3		Pts: Davidovac 19; Rebs: Lazarević 10; Asts: Čović, Davidovac 3

Belgrade
Attendance: 4,000
Referees: Jovčić, Vojinović, Nikolić

29 May 2016
20:00

Mega Leks	64–74	Crvena Zvezda
Scoring by quarter: 13–14, 25–23, 17–18, 9–19
Pts: Janković 23; Rebs: Nikolić 7 Asts: Rašić 7		Pts: Mitrović 20; Rebs: Štimac 13; Asts: Jović 9

Sremska Mitrovica
Attendance: 1,500
Referees: Jovčić, Nešković, Obrknežević

30 May 2016
21:00

FMP	79–74	Partizan
Scoring by quarter: 19–20, 24–16, 18–14, 18–24
Pts: Dobrić 21; Rebs: Lazarević 10; Asts: Čović 7		Pts: Andrew Jones 18; Rebs: Milutinović, Williams 6 Asts: Cvetković 5

Železnik
Attendance: 500
Referees: Belošević, Vojinović, Maričić

1 June 2016
21:00

Partizan	87–78	FMP
Scoring by quarter: 24–10, 17–16, 28–28, 18–24
Pts: Veličković 20; Rebs: Andrew Jones 8 Asts: Wilson 6		Pts: Tejić 16; Rebs: Apić 11; Asts: Lazarević 5

Belgrade
Attendance: 6,000
Referees: Belošević, Jovčić, Vojinović

==== Finals ====
3 June 2016
21:00

Crvena Zvezda	84–53	Partizan
Scoring by quarter: 21–15, 21–12, 22–12, 20–14
Pts: Miller 24; Rebs: Mitrović 7 Asts: Micić 4		Pts: Williams 10; Rebs: Williams 5 Asts: three players 2

Belgrade
Attendance: 5,029
Referees: Belošević, Jovčić, Glišić

5 June 2016
21:00

Partizan	86–87	Crvena Zvezda
Scoring by quarter: 25–21, 29–16, 18–25, 14–25
Pts: Wilson 18; Rebs: Andrew Jones 7 Asts: Wilson 5		Pts: three players 13; Rebs: Mitrović 6 Asts: Jović 7

Belgrade
Attendance: 6,500
Referees: Belošević, Vojinović, Nikolić

7 June 2016
21:00

Crvena Zvezda	72–75	Partizan
Scoring by quarter: 13–5, 16–22, 18–26, 25–22
Pts: Zirbes 19; Rebs: Zirbes 11; Asts: Jović 14		Pts: Andrew Jones, Veličković 13; Rebs: Murić 7 Asts: Veličković, Wilson 4

Belgrade
Attendance: 5,500
Referees: Jovčić, Nešković, Obrknežević

9 June 2016
21:00

Partizan	65–70	Crvena Zvezda
Scoring by quarter: 22–18, 17–23, 9–15, 17–14
Pts: Veličković 19; Rebs: Veličković 6 Asts: three players 2		Pts: three players 15; Rebs: Zirbes 7 Asts: Jović 4

Belgrade
Attendance: 6,500
Referees: Belošević, Vojinović, Maričić

== Individual statistics ==
=== Rating ===
Rank	Name	Team	Games	Rating	PIR
1.	(Serbia) Aleksa Avramović	Borac	24	623	25.96
2.	(Serbia) Danilo Tasić	Konstantin	24	574	23.92
3.	(Serbia) Andrija Bojić	OKK Beograd	24	557	23.21

=== Points ===
Rank	Name	Team	Games	Points	PPG
1.	(Serbia) Aleksa Avramović	Borac	24	491	20.46
2.	(Serbia) Danilo Tasić	Konstantin	24	444	18.50
3.	(Serbia) Milan Trtić	Sloga	26	441	16.96

=== Rebounds ===
Rank	Name	Team	Games	Rebounds	RPG
1.	(Serbia) Stefan Fundić	Beovuk 72	25	257	10.28
2.	(Serbia) Andrija Bojić	OKK Beograd	24	206	8.58
3.	(Serbia) Andrija Simović	Vršac	25	186	7.44

=== Assists ===
Rank	Name	Team	Games	Assists	APG
1.	(Serbia) Filip Čović	FMP	26	169	6.50
2.	(Serbia) Aleksa Avramović	Borac	24	139	5.79
3.	(Serbia) Stefan Pot	Mladost Admiral	19	108	5.68

== Stats leaders ==
=== MVP of the Round ===
First League

Round	Player	Team	Efficiency
1	(Serbia) Stefan Živanović	Smederevo	46
2	(Serbia) Nebojša Jovišić	Vojvodina	35
3	(Serbia) Ivan Smiljanić	Tamiš	30
4	(Slovenia) Vuk Malidžan	OKK Beograd	48
5	(Serbia) Danilo Šibalić	Smederevo	30
6	(Slovenia) Vuk Malidžan (2)	OKK Beograd	34
7	(Serbia) Ivan Demčešen	Jagodina	31
7	(Serbia) Radovan Đoković	Jagodina	31
8	(Serbia) Dušan Vuletić	Sloga	40
9	(Serbia) Dragan Apić	FMP	38
10	(Slovenia) Vuk Malidžan (3)	OKK Beograd	45
11	(Serbia) Nikola Vukasović	OKK Beograd	33
12	(Serbia) Aleksa Avramović	Borac	49
13	(Jamaica) Kimani Ffriend	Jagodina	37
14	(Serbia) Filip Čović	FMP	37
15	(Serbia) Stefan Matović	Sloga	37
16	(Jamaica) Kimani Ffriend (2)	Jagodina	43
17	(Serbia) Danilo Tasić	Konstantin	43
18	(Serbia) Aleksa Avramović (2)	Borac	63
19	(Serbia) Danilo Tasić (2)	Konstantin	34
19	(Jamaica) Kimani Ffriend (3)	Jagodina	34
20	(Serbia) Andrija Bojić	OKK Beograd	41
21	(Serbia) Stefan Matović (2)	Sloga	47
22	(Serbia) Stefan Fundić	Beovuk 72	39
23	(Serbia) Milan Vulić	Spartak	35
24	(Serbia) Danilo Tasić (3)	Konstantin	36
25	(Serbia) Jovan Đorđević Marinković	Napredak	39
26	(Serbia) Stefan Fundić (2)	Beovuk 72	53

Super League

Round	Player	Team	Efficiency
1	(Serbia) Rade Zagorac	Mega Leks	36
2	(Serbia) Vladimir Đorđević	Konstantin	28
3	(Serbia) Rade Zagorac (2)	Mega Leks	30
4	(Serbia) Filip Čović (2)	FMP	32
5	(Montenegro) Danilo Nikolić	Mega Leks	30
6	(Croatia) Ivica Zubac	Mega Leks	36
