= 2014–15 Basketball League of Serbia =

- League: Basketball League of Serbia
- Sport: Basketball
- Duration: October 10, 2014 – June 18, 2015
- TV partner(s): RTS; Arena Sport

First League
- Season champions: FMP
- Season MVP: Vuk Malidžan (OKK Beograd)
- Top scorer: Dragan Kruščić (Tamiš)

Super League
- Season champions: Crvena zvezda
- Season MVP: Boban Marjanović (Crvena zvezda)
- Top scorer: Nikola Jokić (Mega Leks)

Playoff stage

Basketball League of Serbia seasons
- ← 2013–14 2015–16 →

The 2014–15 Basketball League of Serbia season is the 9th season of the Basketball League of Serbia, the highest professional basketball league in Serbia. It is also 71st national championship played by Serbian clubs inclusive of nation's previous incarnations as Yugoslavia and Serbia & Montenegro.

The first half of the season consists of 12 teams and 132-game regular season (22 games for each of the 12 teams) began on October 10, 2014, and will end on March 21, 2015. The second half of the season consists of 4 teams from Adriatic League and the best 4 teams from first half of the season. Each team plays 14 games since March 28, 2015. until June 4, 2015. Playoff starts soon after. The first half is called First League and second is called Super League.

== Teams for 2014–15 season ==
Location of teams in the 2014–15 Basketball League of Serbia

Team	City	Arena	Capacity	Head coach
Spartak	Subotica	SC Dudova Šuma	3.000	Predrag Borilović
Borac Mozzart Sport	Čačak	Hala kraj Morave	4.000	Raško Bojić
Crvena Zvezda	Belgrade	Pionir Hall	8.150	Dejan Radonjić
Napredak Rubin	Kruševac	Kruševac Sports Hall	2.500	Boško Đokić
Konstantin	Niš	Čair Sports Center	5.000	Marko Cvetković
Mega Vizura	Belgrade	New Belgrade Sports Hall	5.000	Dejan Milojević
Metalac Farmakom	Valjevo	Valjevo Sports Hall	1.500	Vladimir Đokić
OKK Beograd	Belgrade	SC Šumice	2.000	Milovan Stepandić
Partizan	Belgrade	Pionir Hall	8.150	Duško Vujošević
FMP	Belgrade	Železnik Hall	2.000	Milan Gurović
Jagodina	Jagodina	JASSA Sports Center	2.600	Aleksandar Ićić
Sloga	Kraljevo	New Ribnica hall	3.350	
Smederevo 1953	Smederevo	Sports Hall Smederevo	2.600	Zoran Todorović
Tamiš	Pančevo	Strelište Sports Hall	1.100	Darko Jovičić
Vojvodina Srbijagas	Novi Sad	SPC Vojvodina	1.100	Dušan Alimpijević
Vršac Swisslion	Vršac	Millennium Center	5.000	Oliver Popović

Teams from Adriatic League

== First League ==
=== Standings ===
Pos	Team	Pld	W	L	PF	PA	PD	Qualification
1	FMP	22	19	3	1843	1600	+243	Super League
2	Konstantin	22	17	5	1825	1618	+207	Super League
3	Vojvodina Srbijagas	22	17	5	1764	1664	+100	Super League
4	Tamiš	22	13	9	1684	1636	+48	Super League
5	Vršac Swisslion	22	13	9	1799	1681	+118	
6	OKK Beograd	22	11	11	1805	1807	−2	
7	Borac	22	9	13	1637	1614	+23	
8	Smederevo 1953	22	9	13	1646	1750	−104	
9	Sloga	22	7	15	1724	1783	−59	
10	Spartak	22	7	15	1665	1777	−112	
11	Napredak Rubin	22	5	17	1402	1602	−200	
12	Jagodina	22	5	17	1558	1820	−262	

=== Results ===
Home \ Away	BOR	FMP	JAG	KON	NAP	OKK	SLO	SME	SPA	TAM	VOJ	VRS
Borac		66–72	80–65	58–70	64–56	77–73	88–72	73–66	75–66	71–58	73–76	79–80
FMP	79–74		76–40	80–74	94–72	77–70	95–88	98–84	87–63	85–70	73–76	79–66
Jagodina	58–86	71–100		77–87	71–69	94–90	67–56	67–76	84–77	59–76	83–95	90–84
Konstantin	98–89	61–80	101–74		70–68	97–72	82–71	101–56	83–82	89–79	82–67	93–83
Napredak Rubin	59–52	75–81	68–57	51–73		68–76	63–94	71–60	56–70	80–78	62–68	50–77
OKK Beograd	91–86	92–102	83–65	86–73	81–70		90–78	75–81	80–66	79–68	98–84	95–89
Sloga	70–75	84–72	86–82	75–86	68–65	88–82		96–81	106–79	64–68	80–87	91–97
Smederevo 1953	85–82	69–75	71–66	65–86	64–68	79–77	91–79		82–71	88–91	82–67	102–98
Spartak	90–80	74–86	100–74	65–74	66–61	101–90	71–70	86–76		67–78	74–85	71–75
Tamiš	66–56	80–85	78–75	118–114	79–62	82–83	78–56	69–65	89–71		67–78	73–67
Vojvodina Srbijagas	79–74	83–81	84–66	67–66	77–57	94–69	84–77	77–71	93–84	73–74		93–83
Vršac Swisslion	85–79	68–84	97–73	55–65	82–51	88–73	84–77	77–52	93–71	69–65	88–77	

Legend: Blue = home team win; Red = away team win.

== Super League ==
=== Standings ===
Pos	Team	Pld	W	L	PF	PA	PD	Qualification
1	Crvena Zvezda	14	13	1	1233	995	+238	Playoff stage & 2015–16 ABA League
2	Partizan	14	13	1	1169	975	+194	Playoff stage & 2015–16 ABA League
3	Metalac	14	8	6	1080	1013	+67	Playoff stage & 2015–16 ABA League
4	Mega Leks	14	7	7	1207	1142	+65	Playoff stage & 2015–16 ABA League
5	Vojvodina	14	6	8	1016	1104	−88	
6	FMP	14	4	10	1078	1110	−32	
7	Konstantin	14	4	10	1029	1187	−158	
8	Tamiš	14	1	13	881	1167	−286	

== Playoff stage ==
Semifinals
1	Crvena Zvezda	109	90
4	Mega Leks	80	89
2	Partizan	86	73
3	Metalac	66	69

Finals
Crvena Zvezda	78	72	58
Partizan	64	69	54

2014–15 Basketball League of Serbia champions

16th title

== Stats leaders ==
=== MVP of the Round ===
First League

Round	Player	Team	Efficiency
1	(Serbia) Aleksandar Stevović	Smederevo 1953	40
2	(Serbia) Stefan Pot	Vojvodina	30
3	(Serbia) Dragan Apić	Vršac	42
4	(Serbia) Filip Čović	FMP	40
5	(Serbia) Milan Vulić	Sloga	28
6	(Serbia) Vuk Malidžan	OKK Beograd	35
7	(Serbia) Filip Čović (2)	FMP	37
8	(Serbia) Jovan Antić & (Serbia) Aleksandar Todorović	Spartak & Sloga	31
9	(Serbia) Vuk Malidžan (2)	OKK Beograd	28
10	(Serbia) Radomir Marojević	OKK Beograd	41
11	(Serbia) Vuk Malidžan (3)	OKK Beograd	38
12	(Serbia) Vuk Malidžan (4)	OKK Beograd	34
13	(Serbia) Miloš Dimić	Vršac	32
14	(Serbia) Stefan Simić	Napredak	42
15	(Serbia) Filip Čović (3)	FMP	29
16	(Serbia) Strahinja Stojačić	Konstantin	29
17	(Serbia) Marko Stojadinović	Smederevo 1953	36
18	(Serbia) Marko Stojadinović (2)	Smederevo 1953	37
19	(Serbia) Ognjen Kužeta	OKK Beograd	30
20	(Serbia) Marko Gudurić & (Serbia) Rajko Kljajević	FMP & Borac	30
21	(Serbia) Miloš Dimić (2) & (Serbia) Nikola Vujović	Vršac & Tamiš	31
22	(Serbia) Marko Gudurić (2)	FMP	40

Super League

Round	Player	Team	Efficiency
1	(Serbia) Nikola Milutinov	Partizan	36
2	(Serbia) Milan Mačvan	Partizan	25
3	(Serbia) Jovan Novak	Vojvodina	32
4	(Serbia) Dejan Davidovac	FMP	30
5	(Serbia) Boban Marjanović	Crvena Zvezda	40
6	(Serbia) Nikola Jokić	Mega Leks	36
7	(Serbia) Nikola Jokić (2) & (Serbia) Jovan Novak (2)	Mega Leks & Vojvodina	36
8	(Serbia) Đorđe Majstorović	Metalac	34
9	(Serbia) Nikola Jokić (3)	Mega Leks	47
10	(Serbia) Nikola Jokić (4)	Mega Leks	29
11	(Serbia) Nikola Jokić (5)	Mega Leks	41
12	(Serbia) Nikola Jokić (6)	Mega Leks	34
13	(Serbia) Nikola Jokić (7)	Mega Leks	52
14	(Serbia) Ljubomir Čampara	Vojvodina	34

Play off

Round	Player	Team	Efficiency
