= Denić =

Denić is a surname. Notable people with the surname include:

- Aleksandar Denić (born 1963), Serbian artist and production designer
- Đorđe Denić (born 1996), Serbian footballer
- Mioljub Denić (1925–2014), Serbian cardiologist and basketball player
- Pavle Denić (1855–1939), Serbian engineer, professor, diplomat and politician
