= Marko Popović (basketball, born 1984) =

Serbian professional basketball player (born 1984)

Personal information
- Born: March 3, 1984 (age 42) Sarajevo, SR Bosnia and Herzegovina, SFR Yugoslavia
- Listed height: 1.93 m (6 ft 4 in)
- Listed weight: 85 kg (187 lb)

Career information
- NBA draft: 2006: undrafted
- Playing career: 2000–2017
- Position: Guard

Career history
- 2000–2002: Zastava
- 2002–2003: Beopetrol
- 2003–2004: Zastava
- 2004–2005: Ibon Nikšić
- 2005–2006: Ergonom Niš
- 2007–2008: Sloga
- 2008–2009: Vojvodina Srbijagas
- 2009: Gymnastikos Olympia Larissas
- 2009: Napredak Kruševac
- 2011: Vojvodina Srbijagas
- 2011: Sloga
- 2011–2012: UCAM Murcia
- 2012: Zlatorog Laško
- 2012–2013: Sloga
- 2014: Vojvodina Srbijagas
- 2015: Smederevo
- 2015: Dinamo Tbilisi
- 2016: Start Lublin
- 2017: Shahrdari Tabriz
- 2017: Karpoš Sokoli
- 2017: Sloga

Marko Popović (born March 3, 1984) is a Serbian former professional basketball player, who played for 17 years professionally, mainly in the Basketball League of Serbia, but also had brief stints in Spain, Georgia, and Poland.
