= 2009–10 Basketball League of Serbia =

- League: Basketball League of Serbia
- Sport: Basketball
- TV partner: RTS

First League
- Season champions: Borac Čačak
- Season MVP: (Serbia) Aleksandar Mladenović (Ergonom)

Super League
- Season champions: Partizan
- Season MVP: (Serbia) Miroslav Raduljica (FMP Železnik)

Playoff stage
- Finals champions: Partizan
- Runners-up: Hemofarm
- Finals MVP: (United States) Bo McCalebb (Partizan)

Basketball League of Serbia seasons
- ← 2008–09 2010–11 →

The 2009–10 Basketball League of Serbia season was the 4th season of the Basketball League of Serbia, the highest professional basketball league in Serbia. It was also 66th national championship played by Serbian clubs inclusive of nation's previous incarnations as Yugoslavia and Serbia & Montenegro.

== Teams for 2009–10 season ==
Team	City	Arena	Capacity
Partizan	Belgrade	Pionir Hall	8.150
Hemofarm	Vršac	Millennium Center	5.000
Crvena zvezda	Belgrade	Pionir Hall	8.150
Radnički	Kragujevac	Lake Hall	4.000
FMP Železnik	Železnik	FMP Hall	3.000
Vojvodina Srbijagas	Novi Sad	Spens Sports Center	11.500
Metalac	Valjevo	Valjevo Sports Hall	1.500
Proleter Naftagas	Zrenjanin	Medison Hall	3.500
Mašinac	Kraljevo		
OKK Beograd	Belgrade	Sport Eko Hall	1.000
Tamiš	Pančevo	Strelište Sports Hall	1.100
Napredak Rubin	Kruševac	Kruševac Sports Hall	2.500
Sloga	Kraljevo	Kraljevo Sports Hall	1.500
Borac	Čačak	Borac Sports Hall	3.000
Novi Sad	Novi Sad	Spens Sports Center	1.100
Radnički KG 06	Kragujevac	Lake Hall	4.000
Mega Vizura	Belgrade	Vizura Sports Center	1.500
Radnički Basket	Novi Sad		
Ergonom	Niš		

Teams from Adriatic League
Teams from Balkan International Basketball League

== Regular season ==
=== First League standings ===
#	Teams	GP	W	L	PTS
1	Borac Čačak*	26	20	6	46
2	Tamiš Petrohemija*	26	19	7	45
3	Metalac*	26	18	8	44
4	OKK Beograd	26	17	9	43
5	Proleter Naftagas	26	15	11	41
6	Vojvodina Srbijagas	26	15	11	41
7	Novi Sad	26	15	11	41
8	Mega Vizura	26	13	13	39
9	Napredak	26	12	14	38
10	Sloga	26	12	14	38
11	Mašinac	26	10	16	36
12	Radnički Basket	26	9	17	35
13	Ergonom	26	5	21	31
14	KG 06	26	2	24	28

=== Super League standings ===
#	Teams	GP	W	L	PTS
1	Partizan*	14	13	1	27
2	Hemofarm*	14	12	2	26
3	Radnički Kragujevac*	14	9	5	23
4	Crvena zvezda*	14	8	6	22
5	FMP Železnik	14	6	8	20
6	Metalac	14	3	11	17
7	Tamiš Petrohemija	14	3	11	17
8	Borac Čačak	14	2	12	14

== Playoff stage ==
Semifinals
1	Partizan	2
4	Crvena zvezda	0
2	Hemofarm	2
3	Radnički Kragujevac	0

Final
Partizan	3^{1}
Hemofarm	0

2009–10 Basketball League of Serbia Champions

Partizan
17th Title
