= Đorđe Ćurčić (basketball, born 2005) =

Serbian basketball player

No. 11 – Borac Čačak
- Position: Shooting guard
- League: Basketball League of Serbia; Adriatic League

Personal information
- Born: 17 April 2005 (age 21) Čačak, Serbia and Montenegro
- Listed height: 1.95 m (6 ft 5 in)

Career information
- Playing career: 2021–present

Career history
- 2021–present: Borac Čačak

Đorđe Ćurčić (Serbian Cyrillic: Ђорђе Ћурчић; born 17 April 2005), also credited to as Đorđe M. Ćurčić, is a Serbian professional basketball player for Borac Čačak of the Basketball League of Serbia and the ABA League. Standing at 1.95 m (6 ft 5 in), he plays shooting guard position.

== Professional career ==
Ćurčić grew up with a youth system of his hometown club Borac. On 3 December 2021, Ćurčić made his ABA League debut in an 80–66 win over Split with no records in a minute of playing time.

== National team career ==
In July 2022, Ćurčić was a member of the Serbia U-17 team at the FIBA Under-17 Basketball World Cup in Spain. Over seven tournament games, he averaged 8.1 points, 3.7 rebounds, and 2.1 assists per game.
