= Aleksa Avramović =

Serbian basketball player (born 1994)

Aleksa Avramović Алекса Аврамовић
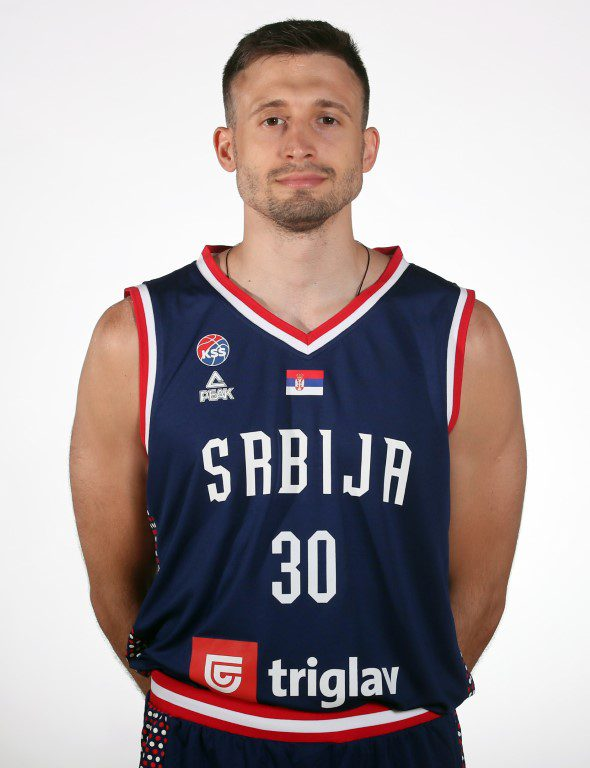
- Avramović with Serbian national team in 2024

No. 4 – Bahçeşehir Koleji
- Position: Point guard / shooting guard
- League: Basketbol Süper Ligi; EuroCup

Personal information
- Born: October 25, 1994 (age 32) Čačak, FR Yugoslavia
- Listed height: 1.93 m (6 ft 4 in)
- Listed weight: 87 kg (192 lb)

Career information
- NBA draft: 2016: undrafted
- Playing career: 2013–present

Career history
- 2013–2014: Borac Čačak
- 2014–2015: OKK Beograd
- 2015–2016: Borac Čačak
- 2016–2019: Varese
- 2019–2020: Unicaja Malaga
- 2019–2020: →Estudiantes
- 2020–2021: Estudiantes
- 2021–2024: Partizan
- 2024–2025: CSKA Moscow
- 2025–present: Dubai Basketball
- 2026–present: →Bahçeşehir Koleji

Career highlights
- Olympics Best Defensive Player (2024); 2x ABA League champion (2023, 2026); VTB United League champion (2025); VTB United League Newcomer of The Year (2025); VTB All-Star (2025); VTB United League Supercup winner (2024); VTB United League Supercup MVP (2024); Serbian First League MVP (2016)
Medals
Men's basketball
Representing Serbia
Olympic Games
Bronze medal – third place	2024 Paris	Team
FIBA World Cup
Silver medal – second place	2023 Philippines–Japan–Indonesia	Team

Aleksa Avramović (Serbian Cyrillic: Алекса Аврамовић; born October 25, 1994) is a Serbian professional basketball player for Bahçeşehir Koleji of the Basketbol Süper Ligi (BSL) and the EuroCup, on loan from Dubai Basketball. He also represents the Serbia men's national basketball team internationally.

== Youth career ==
Avramović played in the youth system of Mladost Čačak, before joining city rivals Borac Čačak in 2013.

== Professional career ==
=== Early years ===
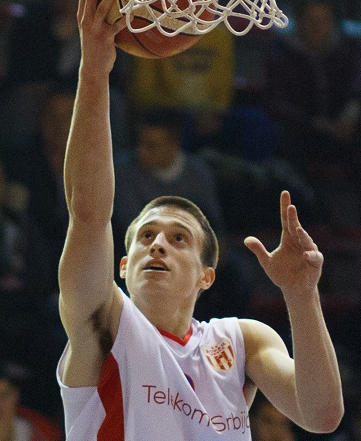
Avramović with Borac Čačak in 2016

Avramović had his first senior basketball experience with Borac Čačak where he played the entire 2013–14 season, after which he spent one season playing for OKK Beograd.

In the summer of 2015, he returned to his former team, Borac Čačak. He was the league's leading scorer and the MVP in the first half of the 2015–16 season. In February game against Mladost Zemun, he scored 47 points on 15 from 21 shooting from the field, while also having 6 assists and 12 rebounds; for such performance, he was named the MVP of the round with the index rating of 63. He finished the season with the averages of 20.1 points, 4.4 rebounds and 5.9 assists per game.

=== Varese (2016–2019) ===
On June 16, 2016, he signed a contract with the Italian team Pallacanestro Varese. On October 3, 2016, he made his debut for the team against Dinamo Sassari, scoring 4 points in 15 minutes. In the first round of the 2016–17 Basketball Champions League, he scored 29 points in 25 minutes against ASVEL. In his debut season with the club, Avramović averaged 6.5 points over 25 Italian League games, while shooting 36.4% from the field.

In 2017–18 season, Avramović improved his season statistics, averaging 11.8 points, 3.1 rebounds and 2.3 assists over 30 Italian League games. In 2018–19, he emerged as team leader, appearing in 30 Italian League games and averaging 17.7 points, 3.4 rebounds and 3 assists per game, while shooting 43.8% from the field and 39.5% on 5.2 three-point attempts per game.

=== Unicaja (2019–2021) ===
On June 28, 2019, he signed a two-year deal with Unicaja of the Liga ACB, reportedly worth 530,000 euros. He was on loan to Estudiantes in December 2019 and averaged 14.7 points per game before the season was suspended. On June 10, 2020, he re-signed with Estudiantes, In 2020–21 season, he averaged 16.4 points, 3.5 assists and 2.9 rebounds over 36 games of the Spanish League.

=== Partizan (2021–2024) ===
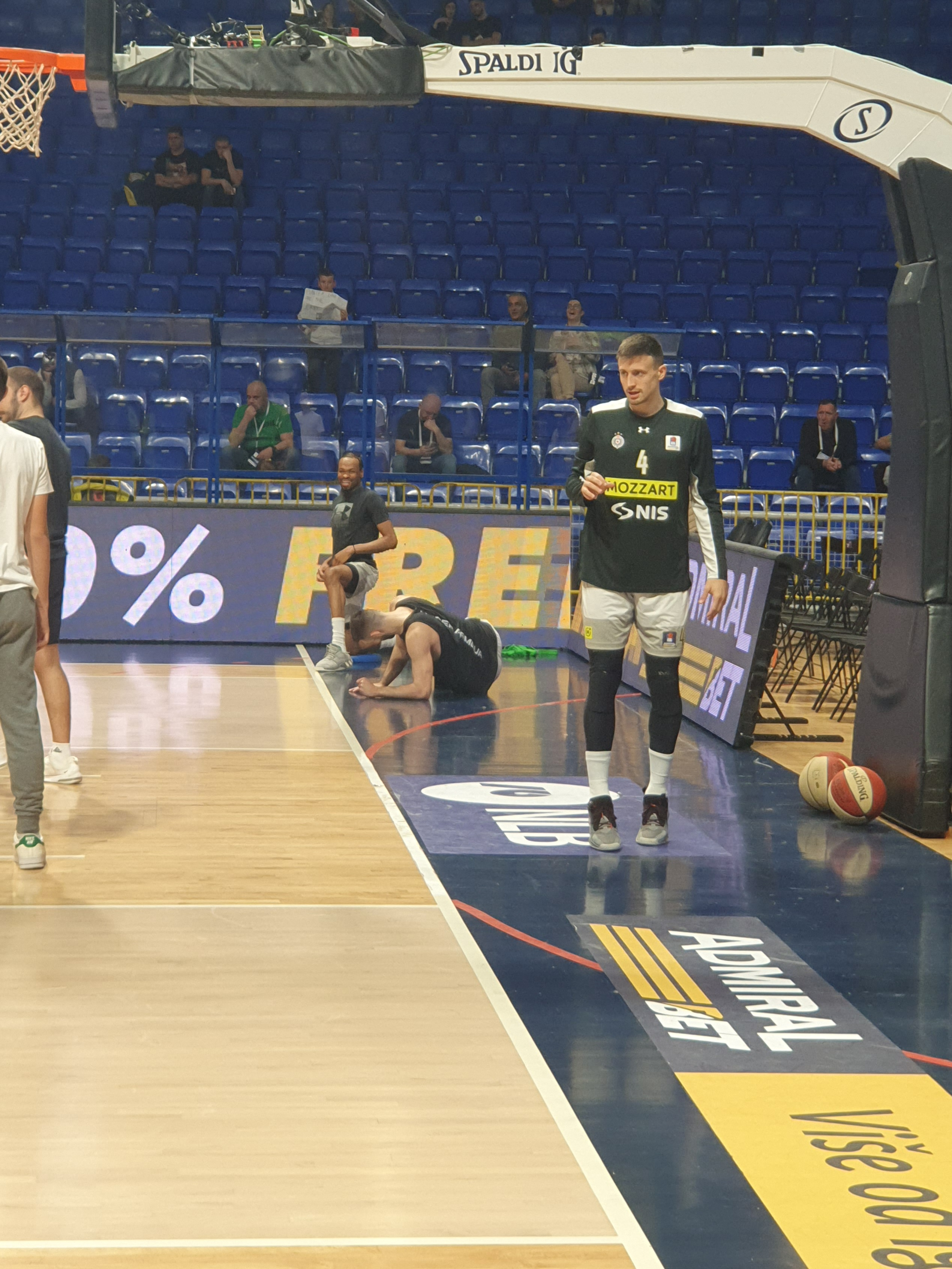
Avramović warming up for game against KK Budućnost

On July 6, 2021, Avramović signed a two-year deal with Partizan of the ABA League and the EuroCup. On March 6, 2022, in the Eternal derby against bitter rivals KK Crvena zvezda, Avramović scored 33 points, recorded 6 assists and 1 rebound. His game of the season brought victory against Zvezda with a score of 98–84 in the 21st round of the ABA League. Over 2021–22 season, Avramović averaged 11.1 points and 3.3 assists over 32 ABA League games.

During the 2022–23 season, Avramović for the first time played in EuroLeague where Partizan was eliminated from the Real Madrid in tight playoffs series. Over the season, Avramović averaged 6.3 points, 1.9 rebounds and 1.3 assists per game. Partizan ended the 2022–23 season by lifting the ABA League championship trophy, after 3–2 score against Crvena zvezda in the Finals series. In ABA League, he averaged 8.4 points and 3.2 assists over 17 games.

On July 6, 2023, Avramović signed a new two-year contract with Partizan, reportadely worth 450,000 euros per season. On 1 March 2024, in a 100-90 win against Anadolu Efes, he set a career-high of 30 points. Over the season, he averaged 10.2 points, 1.8 rebounds and 1.8 assists over 24 EuroLeague games. The season was deemed to be unsuccessful for Partizan as they finished the season without lifting any trophy.

=== CSKA Moscow (2024–2025) ===
On July 25, 2024, he signed with CSKA Moscow of the VTB United League. In his debut season with the team, Avramović averaged 12.1 points, 3.3 assists and 2.8 rebounds over 56 VTB League games. CSKA managed to win the VTB League championship after defeating Zenit Saint Petersburg in the finals series of the playoffs with 4–2.

=== Dubai Basketball (2025–present) ===
In May 2025, Avramović signed a multi-year contract starting with the next season, with the newcomer to the EuroLeague, Dubai Basketball.

==== Loan to Bahçeşehir (2026–present) ====
On July 16, 2026 Avramović was loaned out to Bahçeşehir Koleji.

== National team career ==
Avramović represented the Serbia men's national basketball team at the 2023 FIBA Basketball World Cup, under manager Svetislav Pešić. Serbia went on to win the silver medal, losing to Germany in the final game. Over 7 games played, Avramović averaged 11.3 points, 2.1 assists and 1.4 rebounds per game. He won the bronze medal at the 2024 Summer Olympics with Serbia. Over six tournament games, Avramović averaged 10.5 points, 3.2 assists and 2.5 rebounds, and was named the tournament's Best Defensive Player, ahead of 2024 NBA Defensive Player of the Year Rudy Gobert and Victor Wembanyama who finished second in DPOY voting that same season.

== Career statistics ==
Legend
GP	Games played	GS	Games started	MPG	Minutes per game
FG%	Field-goal percentage	3P%	3-point field-goal percentage	FT%	Free-throw percentage
RPG	Rebounds per game	APG	Assists per game	SPG	Steals per game
BPG	Blocks per game	PPG	Points per game	PIR	Performance index rating
**Bold**	Career high

=== EuroLeague ===
Year	Team	GP	GS	MPG	FG%	3P%	FT%	RPG	APG	SPG	BPG	PPG	PIR
2022–23	Partizan	23	**7**	14.0	.446	**.333**	.688	**1.9**	1.6	.6	**.2**	6.3	5.4
2023–24	Partizan	**24**	6	**18.6**	**.508**	.295	**.775**	1.8	**1.8**	**.7**	**.2**	**10.2**	**8.8**
Career		47	13	14.0	.476	.310	.750	1.8	1.7	.7	.2	8.3	7.1

=== EuroCup ===
Year	Team	GP	GS	MPG	FG%	3P%	FT%	RPG	APG	SPG	BPG	PPG	PIR
2019–20	Málaga	9	3	13.1	.380	.208	.700	1.2	.6	.6	—	5.6	3.2
2021–22	Partizan	**17**	**9**	**20.9**	**.418**	**.218**	**.763**	**2.5**	**3.4**	**1.6**	**.2**	**9.0**	**9.8**
Career		26	12	18.2	.408	.215	.750	2.0	2.4	1.2	.2	7.8	7.5

=== Basketball Champions League ===
Year	Team	GP	GS	MPG	FG%	3P%	FT%	RPG	APG	SPG	BPG	PPG
2016–17	Varese	13	0	20.7	.461	.381	.750	2.2	1.8	.7	.1	12.4
Career		13	0	20.7	.461	.381	.750	2.2	1.8	.7	.1	12.4

=== FIBA Europe Cup ===
Year	Team	GP	GS	MPG	FG%	3P%	FT%	RPG	APG	SPG	BPG	PPG
2018–19	Varese	17	15	22.2	.445	.220	.881	1.9	3.6	1.4	.2	12.3
Career		17	15	22.2	.445	.220	.881	1.9	3.6	1.4	.2	12.3

=== Domestic leagues ===
Year	Team	League	GP	MPG	FG%	3P%	FT%	RPG	APG	SPG	BPG	PPG
2013–14	(Serbia) Borac Čačak	KLS	22	3.0	.333	.143	.500	.2	.3	.2	.1	0.4
2014–15	(Serbia) OKK Beograd	KLS	20	15.4	.566	.300	.816	2.1	1.9	1.2	.1	8.9
2015–16	(Serbia) Borac Čačak	KLS	30	31.6	.527	.390	.850	4.4	5.9	2.1	.3	20.1
2016–17	(Italy) Varese	LBA	25	14.8	.364	.232	.814	1.4	1.3	.7	.0	6.5
2017–18	(Italy) Varese	LBA	33	22.7	.439	.299	.798	3.1	2.2	1.2	.1	12.6
2018–19	(Italy) Varese	LBA	30	28.6	.438	.395	.761	3.4	3.0	1.4	.2	17.7
2019–20	(Spain) Málaga	ACB	11	10.8	.404	.308	.857	1.4	.6	.3	.1	4.4
2019–20	(Spain) Estudiantes	ACB	10	26.2	.412	.345	.750	3.3	1.5	.9	.1	14.7
2020–21	(Spain) Estudiantes	ACB	36	29.8	.438	.312	.839	2.9	3.5	1.2	.3	16.4
2021–22	(Serbia) Partizan	ABA	32	22.0	.481	.409	.775	2.7	3.3	1.1	.2	11.1
2022–23	(Serbia) Partizan	ABA	17	16.2	.551	.442	.833	1.8	3.2	.9	.1	8.3
2023–24	(Serbia) Partizan	KLS	4	29.1	.389	.263	.783	4.0	5.2	.7	.2	12.7
2023–24	(Serbia) Partizan	ABA	25	18.1	.500	.395	.824	2.2	2.7	.9	.2	10.8
