= 2008–09 Basketball League of Serbia =

- League: Basketball League of Serbia
- Sport: Basketball
- TV partner: RTS

First League
- Season champions: Swisslion Vršac
- Season MVP: (Serbia) Uroš Mirković (Mašinac)

Super League
- Season champions: Partizan (Group A); Crvena zvezda (Group B)
- Season MVP: (Serbia) Novica Veličković (Partizan)

Playoff stage
- Finals champions: Partizan
- Runners-up: Crvena zvezda
- Finals MVP: (Serbia) Novica Veličković (Partizan)

Basketball League of Serbia seasons
- ← 2007–08 2009–10 →

The 2008–09 Basketball League of Serbia season was the 3rd season of the highest professional basketball league in Serbia. It was also 65th national championship played by Serbian clubs inclusive of nation's previous incarnations as Yugoslavia and Serbia & Montenegro.

== Teams for 2008–09 season ==
=== Locations and venues ===
City	Teams	Team	Path	Venue (Capacity)
Belgrade	5			
Belgrade	5	Partizan	Adriatic League	Pionir Hall (8,150)
Belgrade	5	Crvena zvezda	Adriatic League	Pionir Hall (8,150)
Belgrade	5	FMP Železnik	Adriatic League	Železnik Hall (3,000)
Belgrade	5	Mega Hypo Leasing	A League	Šumice Sports Center (2,000)
Belgrade	5	Vizura	A League	Vizura Sports Center (1,500)
Novi Sad	3			
Novi Sad	3	Vojvodina Srbijagas	Adriatic League	SPENS main Hall (7,500)
Novi Sad	3	Novi Sad	A League	SPENS main Hall (7,500)
Novi Sad	3	Radnički Invest Inženjering	A League	Basketland (0,350)
Kraljevo	2			
Kraljevo	2	Sloga	A League	Kraljevo Sports Hall (1,500)
Kraljevo	2	Mašinac	A League	Kraljevo Sports Hall (1,500)
Vršac	2			
Vršac	2	Hemofarm	Adriatic League	Millennium Center (5,000)
Vršac	2	Lions	A League	Chemical Medical School Hall (1,100)
Čačak	1			
Čačak	1	Borac	A League	Borac Morava Hall (3,000)
Kragujevac	1			
Kragujevac	1	Radnički 034 Group	A League	Lake Hall (4,000)
Kruševac	1			
Kruševac	1	Napredak	A League	Kruševac Sports Hall (2,500)
Leskovac	1			
Leskovac	1	Zdravlje	A League	Dubočica Sports Center (3,000)
Niš	1			
Niš	1	Ergonom	A League	Čair Sports Center (4,000)
Pančevo	1			
Pančevo	1	Tamiš	A League	Strelište Sports Hall (1,100)
Valjevo	1			
Valjevo	1	Metalac	A League	Valjevo Sports Hall (1,500)

Clubs also participating in the 2008-09 ABA NLB League
Clubs also participating in the 2008–09 BIBL season

== Regular season ==
=== First League ===
==== Standings ====
Pos	Team	Total						
		P	W	L	F	A	D	Pts
1	Lions	26	22	4	2040	1790	(+)250	48
2	Borac	26	18	8	2029	1901	(+)128	44
3	Metalac	26	17	9	2136	2038	(+)98	43
4	Napredak	26	15	11	2051	2030	(+)21	41
5	Mega Hypo Leasing	26	15	11	2175	2196	(-)21	41
6	Radnički 034 Group	26	13	13	2081	2056	(+)25	39
7	Ergonom	26	12	14	2131	2189	(-)58	38
8	Novi Sad	26	12	14	2062	2062	0	38
9	Radnički Invest Inženjering	26	12	14	2002	2059	(-)57	38
10	Sloga	26	11	15	2155	2130	(+)25	37
11	Mašinac	26	10	16	1987	2053	(-)66	36
12	Tamiš	26	10	16	2007	2038	(-)31	36
13	Vizura	26	9	17	1996	2080	(-)84	35
14	Zdravlje	26	6	20	2017	2247	(-)230	32

=== Super League standings & results ===
==== Group A ====
Pos	Team	Total						
		P	W	L	F	Av	D	Pts
1	Partizan	6	6	0	488	352	(+)136	12
2	FMP Železnik	6	3	3	436	439	(-)3	9
3	Vojvodina Srbijagas	6	2	4	442	525	(-)83	8
4	Metalac	6	1	5	420	470	(-)50	7

Results
Team	Partizan	FMP Železnik	Vojvodina Srbijagas	Metalac
Partizan	—	84—56	95—57	80—60
FMP Železnik	63—69	—	92—71	76—66
Vojvodina Srbijagas	66—84	82—77	—	87—84
Metalac	50—76	67—72	93—79	—

==== Group B ====
Pos	Team	Total						
		P	W	L	F	A	D	Pts
1	Crvena zvezda	6	5	1	505	437	(+)68	11
2	Hemofarm	6	5	1	483	421	(+)62	11
3	Lions	6	1	5	389	458	(-)69	7
4	Borac	6	1	5	449	510	(-)61	7

Results
Team	Crvena zvezda	Hemofarm	Lions	Borac Čačak
Crvena zvezda	—	81—76	91—63	109—90
Hemofarm	82—79	—	80—63	78—72
Lions	52—64	60—76	—	77—64
Borac	74—81	66—91	83—74	—

P=Matches played, W=Matches won, L=Matches lost, F=Points for, A=Points against, D=Points difference, Pts=Points

Qualification for Playoff Stage and 2009–10 Adriatic League
Qualified to play best-of-five series for 5th place
Qualification for Super League
Relegation to B League

== 5th place series ==
5th place
A3	Vojvodina Srbijagas	0
B3	Lions	3

== Playoff stage ==
Semifinals
A1	Partizan	3
B2	Hemofarm	1
B1	Red Star	3
A2	FMP Železnik	0

Final
Partizan	3
Red Star	2

2008–09 Basketball League of Serbia Champions

Partizan
16th Title

== Top 5 final ranking ==
Rank	Team
1	Partizan
2	Crvena zvezda
3	Hemofarm
4	FMP Železnik
5	Lions

Rank	Team
1	Partizan
2	Crvena zvezda
3	Hemofarm
4	FMP Železnik
5	Lions

Qualified to play in 2009–10 Euroleague season
Qualified to play in 2009–10 Eurocup season
Qualified to play in 2009–10 Euro Challenge season
Qualified to play in 2009–10 Adriatic League season
