= Nikola Ilić =

Serbian basketball player (1985–2012)

Personal information
- Born: 26 February 1985 Ub, SR Serbia, SFR Yugoslavia
- Died: 7 December 2012 (aged 27) Ub, Serbia
- Listed height: 2.07 m (6 ft 9 in)
- Listed weight: 98 kg (216 lb)

Career information
- NBA draft: 2007: undrafted
- Playing career: 2003–2011
- Position: Power forward

Career history
- 2003–2004: Železničar Čačak
- 2004–2005: Krka
- 2005–2008: Borac Čačak
- 2008–2009: FMP
- 2009–2011: Asesoft Ploiești

Career highlights
- Serbian Super League MVP (2008); Serbian First League MVP (2008); Romanian League champion (2010)

Nikola Ilić (Serbian Cyrillic: Никола Илић, 26 February 1985 – 7 December 2012) was a Serbian professional basketball player.

== Playing career ==
Ilić played for Železničar Čačak, Krka (Slovenia), Borac Čačak, FMP, and Asesoft Ploiești (Romania).

In the 2007–08 BLS season, Ilić was honored with both First League MVP and Super League MVP awards.

== Death ==
On 7 December 2012, Ilić died after long battle against cancer at age of 27.
