= Marko Ivanović =

Serbian basketball player

Borac Čačak
- Title: General manager
- League: Basketball League of Serbia

Personal information
- Born: July 24, 1962 (age 64) SR Serbia, SFR Yugoslavia
- Listed height: 2.04 m (6 ft 8 in)

Career information
- NBA draft: 1984: undrafted
- Playing career: 1981–2003
- Position: Power forward
- Number: 10, 7

Career history
- 1981–1989: Borac Čačak
- 1989–1991: Partizan
- 1991–1992: Rabotnički
- 1992–1993: Apollon Patras
- 1993–1996: Rabotnički
- 1996–1998: Budućnost Podgorica
- 1998–1999: Beobanka
- 1999–2001: Hemofarm
- 2001–2002: Primorka
- 2002–2003: Levski Sofia
Medals
Men's basketball
Representing Yugoslavia
Universiade
Silver medal – second place	1983 Edmonton	Team
European Championship for Cadets
Gold medal – first place	1979 Syria	Team
European Championship for Juniors
Silver medal – second place	1980 Yugoslavia	Team

Marko Ivanović (Serbian Cyrillic: Марко Ивановић; born July 24, 1962) is a Serbian professional basketball executive and former player. He is currently serving as the general manager for Borac Čačak of the Basketball League of Serbia.

== Post-playing career ==
Ivanović was the general manager for Hemofarm from 2003 to 2011. Since 2012, he has been the general manager for Borac Čačak.
