= Danilo Šibalić =

Serbian basketball player

Personal information
- Born: 18 March 1988 (age 38) Belgrade, SR Serbia, SFR Yugoslavia
- Listed height: 2.04 m (6 ft 8 in)
- Listed weight: 103 kg (227 lb)

Career information
- NBA draft: 2010: undrafted
- Playing career: 2005–present
- Position: Forward

Career history
- 2005–2006: Beovuk
- 2006–2007: Vojvodina Srbijagas
- 2008: UBC Sankt Pölten
- 2009: Ergonom
- 2009: Radnički KG 06
- 2009–2010: Ovče Pole
- 2010–2011: Ulcinj
- 2011: Napredak Rubin
- 2012: Servitium
- 2012–2013: Smederevo 1953
- 2013–2014: LF Basket
- 2014: ABA Strumica
- 2014–2015: Teodo Tivat
- 2015: Smederevo 1953
- 2016–2018: Igokea
- 2018–2019: Aubenas US
- 2019: Sloboda Tuzla
- 2019–2020: Aubenas US
- 2020–2021: Žitko Basket

Career highlights
- Bosnian League champion (2017); 2× Bosnian Cup winner (2017, 2018)

Danilo Šibalić (born 18 March 1988) is a Serbian professional basketball player.

== Career ==
Šibalić started his career with KK Beovuk 72. He later played for Vojvodina Srbijagas, UBC St. Pölten (Austria), Ergonom, Radnički KG 06 and Ovče Pole (Macedonia).

In the 2010–11 season, he played for Ulcinj, and for the next season he signed with Napredak Kruševac.

The 2012–13 season he started with KK Servitium of the Bosnian League. After appearing in five games he left Servitium and moved to Smederevo for the rest of the season.

On 15 May 2013 he signed with LF Basket of the Swedish Basketligan for the 2013–14 season.

On 24 September 2014 he signed with ABA Strumica in Macedonia. In December 2015, he left Strumica and signed with Teodo Tivat for the rest of the season.

The 2015–16 season he started with Smederevo. In January 2016, he left Smederevo and signed with Igokea for the rest of the season. On 2 July 2016 he re-signed with Igokea for the 2016–17 season. On 20 June 2017 he signed a two-year contract extension with Igokea.

On 5 August 2018 Šibalić signed for US Aubenas Basket in France to play in the 3rd-tier league for one year.
