= KK Borac Čačak =

Basketball club in Čačak, Serbia

Borac Čačak
- Leagues: Basketball League of Serbia; Adriatic League
- Founded: 25 April 1945; 81 years ago
- History: KK Borac; 1945–present
- Arena: Borac Hall
- Capacity: 3,000
- Location: Čačak, Serbia
- Main sponsor: City of Čačak
- President: Predrag Pantović
- General manager: Marko Ivanović
- Head coach: Saša Ocokoljić
- Championships: 1 National League Cup
- Website: www.kkborac.rs
Home	Away

Košarkaški klub Borac Čačak (Serbian Cyrillic: Кошаркашки клуб Борац Чачак), commonly referred to as KK Borac Čačak or as Borac Mozzart due to sponsorship reasons, is a men's professional basketball club based in Čačak, Serbia. The club plays in the Adriatic League and the Basketball League of Serbia. Their home arena is the Borac Hall.

== History ==
=== 1945–1992 ===
Borac was a member of the Yugoslav First Federal League since the 1952 season. Players that grew up in this club were Radmilo Mišović (top scorer player of first division in the seventies), Dragan Kićanović, Radivoj Živković, Željko Obradović, and many other players who have left a significant mark on the basketball area of European, Yugoslav and Serbian basketball. In the 1972–73 season, the club finished in fourth place in the Regular Season standings of the Yugoslav First Basketball League, which was considered a great success for club from small city in Yugoslavia back then. Also, in the following season, Borac participated in European FIBA Korać Cup. In the 1978–79 Yugoslav First Basketball League season, the club finished in fifth place and club's youth team won the national competition.

=== 1992–2017 ===
In the period of FR Yugoslavia, Borac was a regular participant of top-tier YUBA League. In 1992–93 season, the club made it to the semifinals of the Yugoslav Cup. Following the Montenegrin independence from state union, the club participated in the Basketball League of Serbia, top-tier national league competition and one below the regional ABA League. In the 2009–10 Basketball League of Serbia season, the club finished in first place of the regular season standings of the Basketball League of Serbia, but was eliminated later in the Super League, which consists of best ranked national league clubs and Serbian clubs that participated in the ABA League. In the 2015–16 Basketball League of Serbia and 2016–17 Basketball League of Serbia seasons, the club finished in second place of the regular season standings of the Basketball League of Serbia.

=== 2017–present ===
Starting with the 2017–18 season, the club besides the national league played in the newly established regional ABA League Second Division, where they were first in regular season, but eventually eliminated in the Playoffs. In the 2017–18 Basketball League of Serbia, 2018–19 Basketball League of Serbia and 2019–20 Basketball League of Serbia season as well, the club was first in regular season standings of the Basketball League of Serbia. In 2019–20 season which was cut short due to COVID-19 pandemic, the club based on regular season standings of the 2019–20 ABA League Second Division, was promoted to the top-tier regional league.

Borac finished its debut appearance in the 2020–21 ABA League First Division in 11th place, with 8–18 record, led by head coach Marko Marinović. In the following season, Borac improved its overall record to 9–17, but was forced to play the relegation playoffs because of league regulations with the Serbian team, and the new champion of the ABA League Second Division – Zlatibor, which they won in best of three games format. In November 2022, Dejan Mijatović took the head coaching position and in Borac's third consecutive season (2022–23) of ABA League, they finished in 13th place after avoiding direct elimination with away win over favorite Budućnost. In the relegation playoffs, Borac prevailed over Helios Suns with 2–1 record, to stay in the league. In 2023–24 season, Borac finished in 10th place of the ABA League with 10–16 record.

== Sponsorship naming ==
Borac has had several denominations through the years due to its sponsorship:

- Borac Reksprom: 1992–1993
- Borac Mozzart Sport: 2013–2016
- Borac Mozzart: 2022–present

== Home arenas ==
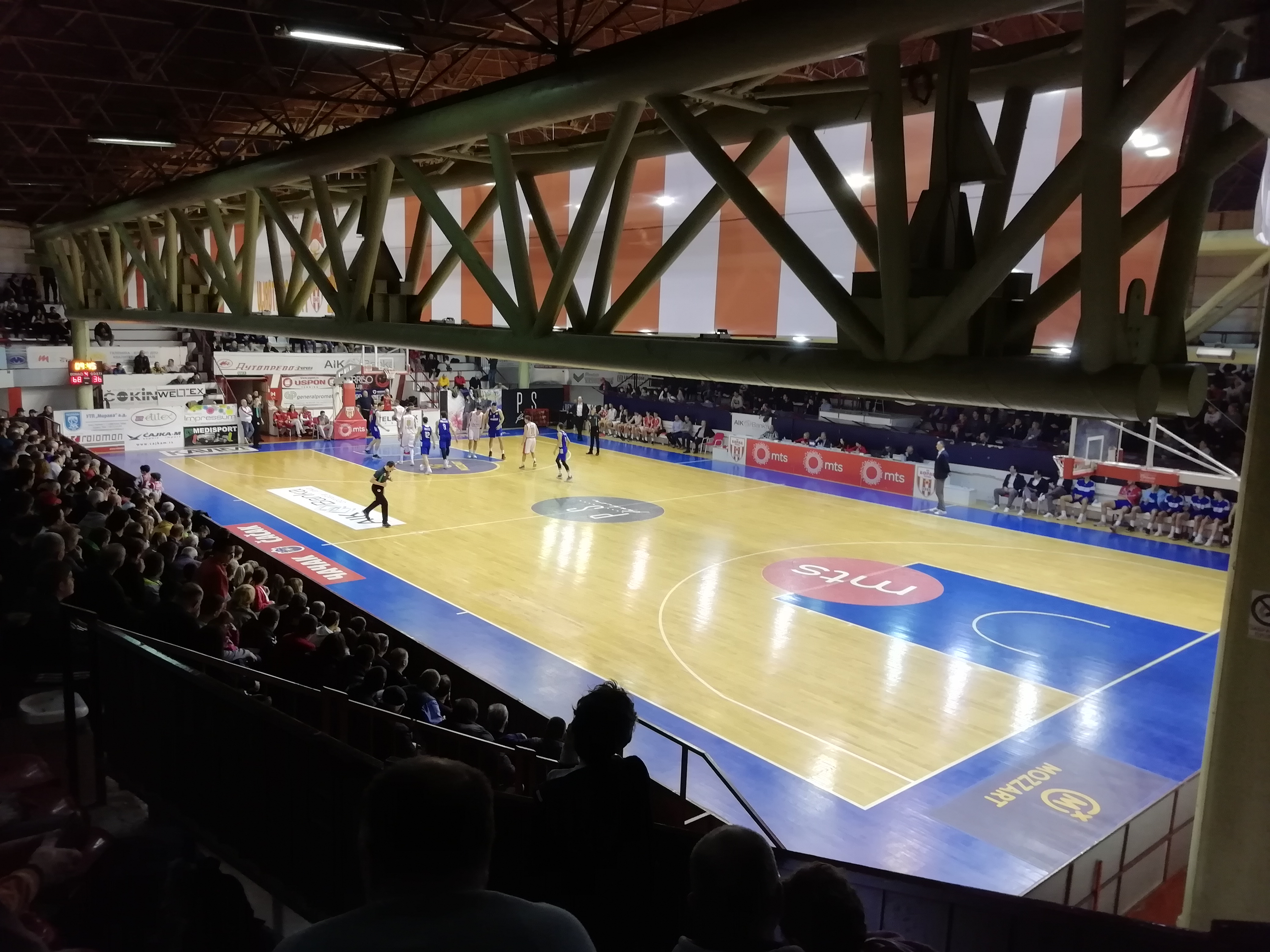
Borac Hall, February 2019

- Borac Hall Near Morava (1969–present)

== Players ==
=== Current roster ===
Note: Flags indicate national team eligibility at FIBA-sanctioned events. Players may hold other non-FIBA nationalities not displayed.

Borac Čačak roster
Players
Coaches

Pos.	No.	Nat.	Name	Ht.	Wt.	Age
G	1	(United States)	Pierre-Louis, Joshua	1.93 m (6 ft 4 in)	82 kg (181 lb)	25 – 8 May 2001
PF	3	(United States)	Spear, Kahliel	2.01 m (6 ft 7 in)		26 – 2 June 2000
PG	4	(Serbia)	Radović, Petar	1.85 m (6 ft 1 in)		18 – 5 November 2007
F	9	(Serbia)	Nikolić, Pavle	2.01 m (6 ft 7 in)		21 – 4 September 2005
F	10	(Bosnia and Herzegovina)	Jošilo, Marko	2.00 m (6 ft 7 in)		34 – 16 October 1992
SG	11	(Serbia)	Ćurčić, Đorđe	1.95 m (6 ft 5 in)		21 – 17 April 2005
F/C	13	(Serbia)	Fundić, Stefan	2.01 m (6 ft 7 in)	105 kg (231 lb)	32 – 30 June 1994
PG	23	(Serbia)	Uskoković, Aleksa	1.90 m (6 ft 3 in)	86 kg (190 lb)	27 – 30 August 1999
SG	44	(Serbia)	Čarapić, Uroš (C)	1.95 m (6 ft 5 in)	91 kg (201 lb)	30 – 24 September 1996
F	55	(Serbia)	Manojlović, Nikola	2.01 m (6 ft 7 in)	95 kg (209 lb)	24 – 14 February 2002

Head coach

- (Serbia) Saša Ocokoljić

Assistant coach(es)

- (Serbia) Miloš Pejanović
- (Serbia) Miroslav Milić

Team manager

- (Serbia) Marko Ivanović

Legend

- (C) Team captain
- (TW) Two-way affiliate player
- Injured

- Roster
Updated: July 1, 2026

=== Depth chart ===
Pos.	Starting 5	Bench
C	Stefan Fundić	Kahliel Spear
PF	Pavle Nikolić	Marko Jošilo
SF	Nikola Manojlović	Uroš Čarapić
SG	Joshua Pierre-Louis	Đorđe Ćurčić
PG	Aleksa Uskoković	Petar Radović

== Coaches ==
- (Socialist Federal Republic of Yugoslavia) Mioljub Denić (1951–1960)
- (Socialist Federal Republic of Yugoslavia) Aleksandar Stefanović (1967)
- (Socialist Federal Republic of Yugoslavia) Josip Sever (1967–1968)
- (Socialist Federal Republic of Yugoslavia) Aleksandar Stefanović (1968–1969)
- (Socialist Federal Republic of Yugoslavia) Radmilo Mišović (1969)
- (Socialist Federal Republic of Yugoslavia) Aleksandar Stefanović (1969–1970)
- (Socialist Federal Republic of Yugoslavia) Dragoljub Pljakić (1970–1971)
- (Socialist Federal Republic of Yugoslavia) Lazar Lečić (1972–1973)
- (Socialist Federal Republic of Yugoslavia) Slobodan Koprivica (1973–1974)
- (Socialist Federal Republic of Yugoslavia) Nikola Mišović (1975–1976)
- (Socialist Federal Republic of Yugoslavia) Slobodan Koprivica (1977–1978)
- (Socialist Federal Republic of Yugoslavia) Aleksandar Nikolić (1978–1980)
- (Socialist Federal Republic of Yugoslavia) Slobodan Koprivica (1981–1983)
- (Socialist Federal Republic of Yugoslavia) Maško Purić (1983)
- (Socialist Federal Republic of Yugoslavia) Nenad Trajković (1989–1990)
- (Socialist Federal Republic of Yugoslavia) Ratko Joksić (1990–1992)
- (Federal Republic of Yugoslavia) Vladimir Androić (1992–1993)
- (Federal Republic of Yugoslavia) Slobodan Janković (1994–1995)
- (Federal Republic of Yugoslavia) Milovan Stepandić (1998–2000)
- (Federal Republic of Yugoslavia) Dejan Mijatović (2000–2002)
- (Federal Republic of Yugoslavia) Raško Bojić (2002–2003)
- (Serbia) Milovan Stepandić (2005–2008)
- (Serbia) Raško Bojić (2008–2015)
- (Serbia) Aleksandar Bjelić (2015)
- (Serbia) Raško Bojić (2015–2018)
- (Serbia) Jovica Arsić (2018–2019)
- (Serbia) Marko Marinović (2019–2022)
- (Serbia) Dejan Mijatović (2022–2024)
(Serbia) Saša Ocokoljić (2024–present)

== Hall of Famers and greatest players ==
=== Naismith Memorial Basketball Hall of Fame ===
Borac Čačak Hall of Famers
Coaches
Name	Position	Tenure	Inducted
Aleksandar Nikolić	Head coach	1978–1980	1998

=== FIBA Hall of Fame ===
KK Borac Čačak Hall of Famers
Players
No.	Name	Position	Tenure	Inducted
	Dragan Kićanović	SG	1971–1972	2010
Coaches
Name		Position	Tenure	Inducted
Aleksandar Nikolić		Head coach	1978–1980	2007

=== FIBA Order of Merit recipients ===
FIBA Order of Merit recipients
Order	Name	Tenure	Inducted
19	Aleksandar Nikolić	1978–1980 as coach	1995

=== FIBA's 50 Greatest Players ===
Borac Čačak Players
No.	Name	Position	Tenure	Inducted
	Dragan Kićanović	SG	1971–1972	1991

== Season-by-season ==
Season	Tier	Division	Pos.	Postseason	W–L	National Cup	Adriatic competitions			European competitions
2006–07	1	BLS First League	6	—	11–11	—	—			—
2007–08	1	BLS First League	3	SL 7th	16–20	Quarterfinalist	—			—
2008–09	1	BLS First League	2	SL B-4th	19–13	Quarterfinalist	—			—
2009–10	1	BLS First League	1	SL 8th	22–16	—	—			—
2010–11	1	BLS First League	11	—	11–15	—	—			—
2011–12	1	BLS First League	9	—	12–14	—	—			—
2012–13	1	BLS First League	8	—	13–13	—	—			—
2013–14	1	BLS First League	4	SL 8th	20–20	Quarterfinalist	—			—
2014–15	1	BLS First League	7	—	9–13	—	—			—
2015–16	1	BLS First League	2	SL B-4th	19–13	Quarterfinalist	—			—
2016–17	1	BLS First League	2	SL 6th	24–16	—	—			—
2017–18	1	BLS First League	1	Semifinals	28–8	Quarterfinalist	ABA 2nd League	SF	16–7	—
2018–19	1	BLS First League	1	SL A-3rd	28–8	Quarterfinalist	ABA 2nd League	SF	13–11	—
2019–20	1	BLS First League	1	Abd	23–3	Quarterfinalist	ABA 2nd League	Abd	20–2	—
2020–21	1	BLS Super League	NH	Semifinals	2–2	Quarterfinalist	ABA 1st League	11	8–18	—
2021–22	1	BLS Super League	NH	PR Runners-up	4–3	Quarterfinalist	ABA 1st League	11	9–17	—
2022–23	1	BLS Super League	NH	SL B-2nd	4–2	Quarterfinalist	ABA 1st League	13	7–19	—
2023–24	1	BLS Super League	NH	Quarterfinals	2–2	Quarterfinalist	ABA 1st League	10	10–16	—
2024–25	1	BLS Super League	NH	Preliminary round	2–10	Quarterfinalist	ABA 1st League	12	10–20	—

== Trophies and awards ==
=== Trophies ===
- Yugoslav Federal B League (2nd-tier / defunct)
  - Winner (1): 1980–81
- YUBA B League (2nd-tier / defunct)
  - Winner (2): 1998–99, 2003–04
- League Cup of Serbia (2nd-tier)
  - Winner (1): 2013–14

=== Awards ===
- BLS First League MVP
  - (Serbia) Nikola Ilić (1) – 2007–08
  - (Serbia) Aleksa Avramović (1) – 2015–16
- BLS Super League MVP
  - (Serbia) Nikola Ilić (1) – 2007–08
- Yugoslav League Top Scorer
  - (Socialist Federal Republic of Yugoslavia) Radmilo Mišović (5) – 1967–68, 1968–69, 1970–71, 1971–72, 1973–74

== Notable players ==
Note: Flags indicate national team eligibility at FIBA-sanctioned events. Players may hold other non-FIBA nationalities not displayed.

Criteria

To appear in this section a player must have either:

- Set a club record or won an individual award while at the club
- Played at least one official international match for their national team at any time
- Played at least one official NBA match at any time.

1970s

- (Socialist Federal Republic of Yugoslavia) Goran Grbović
- (Socialist Federal Republic of Yugoslavia) Dragan Kićanović
- (Socialist Federal Republic of Yugoslavia) Milan Kurćubić
- (Socialist Federal Republic of Yugoslavia) Radmilo Mišović
- (Socialist Federal Republic of Yugoslavia) Radivoj Živković

1980s

- (Socialist Federal Republic of Yugoslavia) Radisav Ćurčić
- (Socialist Federal Republic of Yugoslavia) Marko Ivanović
- (Socialist Federal Republic of Yugoslavia) Željko Obradović

1990s

- (North Macedonia) Igor Mihajlovski
- (Serbia and Montenegro) Haris Brkić
- (Serbia and Montenegro) Branko Milisavljević
- (Serbia and Montenegro) Oliver Popović
- (Serbia and Montenegro) Miroslav Radošević

2000s

- (Serbia and Montenegro) Branko Cvetković
- (Serbia and Montenegro) Zoran Erceg
- (Serbia and Montenegro) Dragan Labović
- (Serbia and Montenegro) Marko Marinović
- (Serbia and Montenegro) Aleksandar Rašić
- (Serbia and Montenegro) Duško Savanović
- (Serbia and Montenegro) Miloš Teodosić
- (Serbia) Nikola Ilić
- (Serbia) Branko Jorović
- (Serbia) Miroslav Raduljica

2010s

- (Bosnia and Herzegovina) Aleksej Nešović
- (Serbia) Aleksa Avramović
- (Serbia) Ilija Đoković
- (Serbia) Nemanja Protić

2020s

- (United States) Hunter Hale
- (Argentina) Lautaro López
- (Georgia (country)) Duda Sanadze
- (Serbia) Sava Lešić
- (Serbia) Ivan Marinković
- (Serbia) Dušan Miletić
- (United States) Bryce Jones
- (Serbia) Filip Rebrača

== International record ==
Season	Achievement	Notes
FIBA Korać Cup
1979–80	Round of 16	3rd in Group C with Hapoel Tel Aviv, Antonini Siena, ASPO Tours (3–3)
1984–85	Second round	Eliminated by Fenerbahçe, 171–172 (1–1)
1973–74	First round	Eliminated by Innocenti Milano, 155–176 (0–2)

== See also ==
- KK Železničar Čačak
- KK Čačak 94
- KK Mladost Čačak
