= Saša Ocokoljić =

Serbian basketball player and coach

Personal information
- Born: 21 October 1976 (age 50) Podgorica, SFR Yugoslavia
- Listed height: 1.83 m (6 ft 0 in)

Career information
- Playing career: 1996–2012
- Position: Point guard
- Coaching career: 2014–present

Career history

Playing
- 1996–2001: Borac Čačak
- 2001–2002: Balkan Botevgrad
- 2002–2004: OKK Beograd
- 2004: Banvit
- 2004: Borac Čačak
- 2005–2006: CSU Asesoft Ploiești
- 2006–2007: Kyiv
- 2007–2008: Ironi Nahariya
- 2008–2009: Swisslion Lions
- 2009–2010: Keravnos
- 2010–2011: PBG Poznań
- 2011: Feni Industries
- 2012: Borac Čačak

Coaching
- 2014–2015: CSU Ploiești (assistant)
- 2015–2017: CSU Ploiești
- 2017–2019: Steaua București (assistant)
- 2019–2021: Steaua București
- 2020–2022: CSO Voluntari

Saša Ocokoljić (Serbian Cyrillic: Саша Оцокољић; born 21 October 1976) is a Serbian professional basketball coach and former player, who last served as head coach for CSO Voluntari of the Liga Națională.
