= Mioljub Denić =

Serbian chief physician, cardiologist, basketball player and coach

- Born: 1925
- Died: 13 November 2014 (aged 88–89); Čačak, Serbia
- Education: University of Belgrade (MD)
- Occupations: chief physician; cardiologist; internist; basketball player; basketball coach
- Medical career
- Field: cardiologist; internist
- Basketball career

Career information
- Playing career: 1942–1956
- Coaching career: 1946–1960

Career history

Playing
- 1942: SK 1913
- 1946–1950: Metalac Beograd
- 1951–1956: Borac Čačak

Coaching
- 1946–1948: Metalac Beograd
- 1951–1960: Borac Čačak

Mioljub "Bole" Denić (Serbian Cyrillic: Миољуб "Боле" Денић; 1925 – 13 November 2014) was a Serbian chief physician, cardiologist, basketball player and coach.
