= 2006–07 Basketball League of Serbia =

- League: Basketball League of Serbia
- Sport: Basketball
- TV partner: RTS

First League
- Season champions: Vojvodina Srbijagas
- Season MVP: (Serbia) Miloš Bojović (Sloga Kraljevo)

Super League
- Season champions: Hemofarm
- Season MVP: (Serbia) Miloš Bojović (Sloga Kraljevo)

Playoff stage
- Finals champions: Partizan
- Runners-up: Crvena zvezda
- Finals MVP: (Serbia) Milan Gurović (Crvena zvezda)

Basketball League of Serbia seasons
- ← 2005–06 (YUBA) 2007–08 →

The 2006–07 Basketball League of Serbia season was the 1st season of the Basketball League of Serbia, the highest professional basketball league in Serbia. It was also the 63rd national championship played by Serbian clubs inclusive of nation's previous incarnations as Yugoslavia and Serbia & Montenegro.

== Regular season ==
=== First League standings ===
Pos	Team	Total						
		P	W	L	F	A	D	Pts
1	Vojvodina Srbijagas	22	21	1	1895	1650	(+)245	43
2	Sloga	22	14	8	1829	1752	(+)77	36
3	Mega Ishrana	22	13	9	1951	1832	(+)119	35
4	Mašinac	22	12	10	1631	1632	(-)1	34
5	Novi Sad	22	11	11	1815	1773	(+)42	33
6	Borac	22	11	11	1794	1795	(-)1	33
7	Radnički	22	11	11	1849	1857	(-)8	33
8	Zdravlje	22	10	12	1684	1666	(+)18	32
9	Swisslion Takovo	22	8	14	1769	1809	(-)40	30
10	Ergonom	22	8	14	1741	1901	(-)160	30
11	Napredak Rubin	22	7	15	1703	1853	(-)150	29
12	OKK Beograd	22	6	16	1650	1791	(-)141	28

* Source: srbijasport.net

=== Super League standings ===
Pos	Team	Total						
		P	W	L	F	A	D	Pts
1	Hemofarm*	14	12	2	1240	1118	(+)122	26
2	FMP Železnik*	14	12	2	1230	1089	(+)141	26
3	Partizan*	14	10	4	1256	1114	(+)142	24
4	Crvena zvezda*	14	9	5	1275	1211	(+)64	23
5	Vojvodina Srbijagas*	14	6	8	1144	1153	(-)9	20
6	Mega Ishrana	14	3	11	1166	1216	(-)50	17
7	Mašinac	14	3	11	1038	1270	(-)232	17
8	Sloga	14	1	13	1105	1283	(-)178	15

* Source: srbijasport.net

P=Matches played, W=Matches won, L=Matches lost, F=Points for, A=Points against, D=Points difference, Pts=Points

(*)Qualification for Adriatic League

Qualification for Playoff stage
Qualification for Super League
Relegation to B League

== Playoff stage ==
=== Semifinals ===
1st Round

June 08, 2007

FMP Železnik	77–81	Partizan
Scoring by quarter: 24–17, 19–24, 20–21, 14–19

Železnik Hall, Železnik

June 09, 2007

Hemofarm	72–74	Crvena zvezda
Scoring by quarter: 21–20, 14–13, 19–17, 18–24

Millennium Center, Vršac

2nd Round

June 10, 2007

Partizan	90–73	FMP Železnik
Scoring by quarter: 22–20, 21–17, 24–13, 23–23

Pionir Hall, Belgrade

June 12, 2007

Crvena zvezda	91–81	Hemofarm
Scoring by quarter: 23–22, 17–14, 18–23, 33–22

Pionir Hall, Belgrade

=== Final ===
1st Round

June 17, 2007

Partizan	91–89	Crvena zvezda
Scoring by quarter: 27–23, 12–22, 27–23, 25–21

Pionir Hall, Belgrade

2nd Round

June 19, 2007

Crvena zvezda	83–100	Partizan
Scoring by quarter: 25–26, 15–17, 19–29, 24–28

Pionir Hall, Belgrade

3rd Round

June 22, 2007

Partizan	77–91	Crvena zvezda
Scoring by quarter: 23–25, 13–24, 16–20, 25–22

Pionir Hall, Belgrade

4th Round

June 24, 2007

Crvena zvezda	67–84	Partizan
Scoring by quarter: 16–17, 20–27, 12–19, 19–21

Pionir Hall, Belgrade

=== Bracket ===
Semifinals
1	Hemofarm	0
4	Crvena zvezda	2
2	FMP Železnik	0
3	Partizan	2

Final
Crvena zvezda	1
Partizan	3

2006–07 Basketball League of Serbia Champions

Partizan
14th Title

== See also ==
2006-07 Adriatic Basketball League
