= Aleksandar Mladenović (basketball) =

Serbian basketball player

Konstantin
- Position: Center

Personal information
- Born: December 2, 1984 (age 41) Niš, SR Serbia, SFR Yugoslavia
- Listed height: 2.07 m (6 ft 9 in)
- Listed weight: 117 kg (258 lb)

Career information
- NBA draft: 2006: undrafted
- Playing career: 2002–present

Career history
- 2002–2007: Ergonom Best
- 2007: Mega Ishrana
- 2007–2008: Swisslion Vršac
- 2008: Hemofarm
- 2008–2010: Ergonom Best
- 2010–2011: Mureș
- 2011–2012: WKS Śląsk Wrocław
- 2012–2013: Gaz Metan Mediaș
- 2013–2014: Mureș Targu-Mures
- 2014–2015: WKS Śląsk Wrocław
- 2015–2017: BCM U Pitești
- 2017: Mureș Targu-Mures
- 2017–2019: MKS Dąbrowa Górnicza
- 2019–present: Konstantin

Career highlights
- Romanian Cup winner (2013); Serbian First League MVP (2010)

Aleksandar Mladenović (Serbian Cyrillic: Александар Младеновић; born December 2, 1984) is a Serbian professional basketball player for Konstantin.

== Professional career ==
On December 18, 2017, Mladenović signed for MKS Dąbrowa Górnicza of the Polish Basketball League.
