= Andrija Simović =

Serbian basketball player

Andrija Simović (Serbian Cyrillic: Андрија Симовић, born 11 March 1995, Belgrade, Serbia) is a Serbian professional basketball player, currently playing as a power forward for KK Ratnici, Niš of the 1.Man Regional League - East.
