= 2007–08 Basketball League of Serbia =

- League: Basketball League of Serbia
- Sport: Basketball
- TV partner: RTS

First League
- Season champions: Swisslion Vršac
- Season MVP: (Serbia) Nikola Ilić (Borac Čačak)

Super League
- Season champions: Partizan
- Season MVP: (Serbia) Nikola Ilić (Borac Čačak)

Playoff stage
- Finals champions: Partizan
- Runners-up: Hemofarm
- Finals MVP: (Montenegro) Nikola Peković (Partizan)

Basketball League of Serbia seasons
- ← 2006–07 2008–09 →

The 2007–08 Basketball League of Serbia season was the 2nd season of the Basketball League of Serbia, the highest professional basketball league in Serbia. It was also 64th national championship played by Serbian clubs inclusive of nation's previous incarnations as Yugoslavia and Serbia & Montenegro.

== Regular season ==
=== First League standings ===
Pos	Team	Total						
		P	W	L	F	A	D	Pts
1	Lions	22	17	5	1873	1690	(+)183	39
2	Vizura	22	14	8	1828	1765	(+)63	36
3	Borac	22	14	8	1769	1666	(+)103	36
4	Radnički 034 Group	22	13	9	1803	1798	(+)5	35
5	Mega Aqua Monta	22	12	10	1841	1793	(+)48	15
6	Sloga	22	12	10	1836	1761	(+)75	34
7	Novi Sad	22	11	11	1788	1811	(-23)	33
8	Mašinac	22	10	12	1694	1737	(-43)	32
9	Radnički Invest Inženjering	22	9	13	1742	1768	(-26)	31
10	Napredak Rubin	22	9	13	1891	1984	(-93)	31
11	Zdravlje	22	9	13	1767	1790	(-)23	31
12	Ergonom	22	2	20	1706	1975	(-)269	24

* Source: srbijasport.net

=== Super League standings ===
Pos	Team	Total						
		P	W	L	F	A	D	Pts
1	Partizan Igokea	14	12	2	1177	978	(+)199	26
2	FMP	14	12	2	1269	1110	(+)159	26
3	Hemofarm	14	9	5	1087	970	(+)117	23
4	Crvena zvezda	14	9	5	1220	1172	(+)48	23
5	Vojvodina Srbijagas	14	7	7	1042	1054	(-)12	21
6	Lions	14	4	10	1061	1122	(-)61	18
7	Borac	14	2	12	1009	1241	(-)232	16
8	Vizura	14	1	13	990	1208	(-)218	15

* Source: srbijasport.net

P=Matches played, W=Matches won, L=Matches lost, F=Points for, A=Points against, D=Points difference, Pts=Points

Qualification for Playoff Stage and Adriatic League
Qualification for Super League
Relegation to B League

== Playoff stage ==
Semifinals
1	Partizan Igokea	2
4	Crvena zvezda	0
2	FMP Železnik	1
3	Hemofarm STADA	2

Final
1	Partizan Igokea	3
3	Hemofarm STADA	1

2007–08 Basketball League of Serbia Champions

Partizan
15th Title
