= KK Radnički KG 06 =

Defunct basketball club in Kragujevac, Serbia

Radnički KG 06
- Founded: 2004; 21 years ago
- Dissolved: 2011; 14 years ago
- History: KK Radnički Zastava (2004–2006); KK Radnički (2006–2007); KK Radnički KG 06 (2007–2011)
- Arena: Jezero Hall
- Location: Kragujevac, Serbia
- Team colors: Red and White
- Championships: 1 National League Cup

Košarkaški klub Radnički KG 06 (Serbian Cyrillic: КК Раднички КГ 06), commonly referred to as Radnički KG 06, was a men's professional basketball club based in Kragujevac, Serbia.

== History ==
The club was founded in 2004 by the merger of two local clubs (Radnički and Zastava), and was named KK Radnički Zastava.

In 2006, the club switched its name to just KK Radnički, and competed under the sponsorship name Radnički 034 Group. From 2009, the club was known as KK Radnički KG 06. In the summer of 2006, the club bought the Basketball League of Serbia license from Atlas.

Radnički KG 06 played in the Balkan International Basketball League during the 2008–09 season.

== Coaches ==
- (Serbia and Montenegro) Slobodan Nikolić (2004–2005)
- (Serbia and Montenegro) Aleksandar Bućan (2005–2006)
- (Serbia) Zoran Cvetanović (2006–2008)
- (Serbia) Radovan Pešić (2008–2009)

== Season by season ==
Season	Tier	Division	Pos.	Postseason	W–L	Radivoj Korać Cup	Regional competition		
2004–05	2	SCG B League	3		18–8	—			
2005–06	2	SCG B League	6		17–9	—			
2006–07	1	BLS First League	7	DNQ	11–11	Quarterfinalist			
2007–08	1	BLS First League	4	DNQ	13–9	—			
2008–09	1	BLS First League	6	DNQ	13–13	—	Balkan League	QF	3–7
2009–10	1	BLS First League	14	DNQ	2–24	—			
2010–11	2	Second League	14		0–26	—			
