= Oliver Popović =

Serbian basketball player and coach

Personal information
- Born: 18 March 1970 (age 56) Titovo Užice, SR Serbia, SFR Yugoslavia
- Listed height: 2.00 m (6 ft 7 in)

Career information
- NBA draft: 1992: undrafted
- Playing career: 1986–2005
- Position: Small forward
- Coaching career: 2005–present

Career history

Playing
- 1986–1991: Partizan
- 1991–1992: Infos RTM
- 1992–1993: Borac Čačak
- 1993–1995: Spartak Subotica
- 1995–1997: Beobanka
- 1997–1999: Crvena zvezda
- 1999–2000: Beobanka
- 2000–2001: Lokomotiv Rostov
- 2001–2003: UNICS Kazan
- 2003–2005: Maroussi

Coaching
- 2005: Avala Ada
- 2005–2006: Tamiš
- 2006–2007: Mega Ishrana
- 2007–2008: Vizura
- 2008–2009: Khimik
- 2012–2014: Vršac
- 2015–2016: SCM U Craiova
- 2016–2017: Napredak Kruševac
- 2017: Dynamic
- 2018–2020: Novi Pazar
- 2020–2022: Sloboda Užice
- 2022–2024: UNICS (youth)
- 2024–: Zenit-2 Saint Petersburg

Career highlights
- Serbian League Cup winner (2019)
Medals
Men's basketball
Representing (Socialist Federal Republic of Yugoslavia) Yugoslavia
European Championship for Cadets
Gold medal – first place	1987 Hungary	Team

Oliver Popović (Serbian Cyrillic: Оливер Поповић; born 18 March 1970) is a Serbian professional basketball coach and former player.

== Playing career ==
He was a Yugoslav champion (1987 and 1998) and Cup holder (1989), silver medalist of Russian (2002) and Greek (2004) basketball championships; bronze medalist of 1988 European Champions' Cup, winner of 1989 Korać Cup and 2003 NEBL; finalist of the 2004 FIBA Euroleague.

== Coaching career ==
On 7 August 2017, Popović was named a head coach of the Belgrade team Dynamic. On 19 December, he parted ways with Dynamic.

On 21 June 2018, Popović became the head coach for Novi Pazar of the Basketball League of Serbia. He left Novi Pazar after the 2019–20 season.

On 1 November 2020, Popović was hired as the new head coach for his hometown team Sloboda Užice.

On 19 November 2022, Popović became the head coach of UNICS Kazan youth team.
