= Raško Bojić =

Serbian basketball coach

Borac Čačak
- Position: Youth coach

Personal information
- Born: December 17, 1964 (age 61) Čačak, SR Serbia, SFR Yugoslavia
- Coaching career: 2002–present

Career history

Coaching
- 2002–2003: Borac Čačak
- 2005–2008: Borac Čačak (assistant)
- 2008–2015, 2015–2018: Borac Čačak
- 2018–present: Borac Čačak U19

Career highlights
- Serbian League Cup winner (2014)

Raško Bojić (Serbian Cyrillic: Рашко Бојић; born December 17, 1964) is a Serbian basketball coach.

== Coaching career ==
In January 2015, Bojić resigned as a head coach of Borac Čačak. On December 12, 2015, he returns to Borac as the head coach. He resigned on April 9, 2018.
