= Kruševac Sports Hall =

Sports Hall

Kruševac Sports Hall Хала спортова у Крушевцу
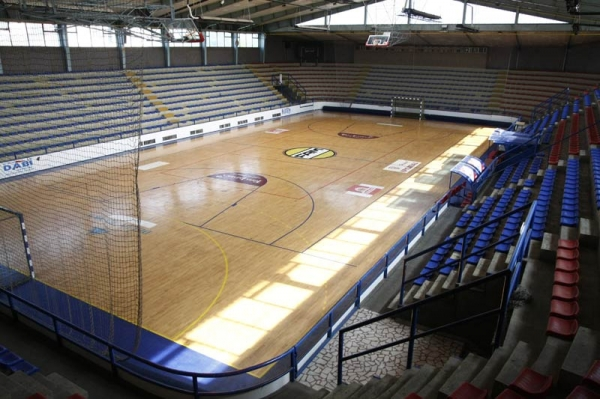
- Location: Kruševac, Serbia
- Owner: City of Kruševac
- Capacity: 2,500

Construction
- Opened: 1977
- Renovated: 2013

Tenants
- KK Napredak Kruševac; ORK Napredak

Kruševac Sports Hall (Serbian: Хала спортова у Крушевцу, romanized: Hala sportova u Kruševcu) is an indoor arena in Kruševac. It has a capacity of 2500 people. It is a home arena of basketball team KK Napredak and ORK Napredak. Sports Hall was opened in 1977 and renovated in 2013. Sports Hall also has a gymnastics hall called "Soko" meaning "Falcon".

== See also ==
- List of indoor arenas in Serbia
