= Valjevo Sports Hall =

Indoor arena in Valjevo, Serbia

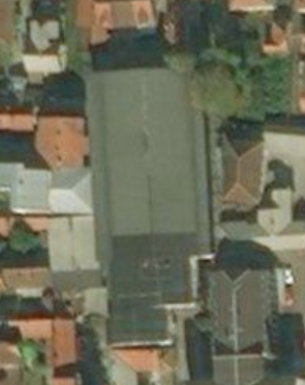
- Interactive map of Valjevo Sports Hall
- Location: Valjevo, Serbia
- Coordinates: 44.27164°N 19.88279°E
- Capacity: 1,500

Construction
- Opened: 1972

Tenant
- KK Metalac

Valjevo Sports Hall is an indoor arena in Valjevo, built in 1972. It has a capacity of 2500 people. It is a home arena of basketball team KK Metalac.

== See also ==
- List of indoor arenas in Serbia
