= KK Sloga =

Basketball club in Kraljevo, Serbia

Sloga
- Nickname: Beli (The Whites)
- Leagues: Basketball League of Serbia
- Founded: 1949; 77 years ago
- History: KK Sloga; 1949–1992, 1996–present KK Bobanik; 1992–1996
- Arena: Kraljevo Sports Hall
- Capacity: 3,331
- Location: Kraljevo, Serbia
- Team colors: White and Blue
- Head coach: Marko Dimitrijević
- Website: kksloga.com
| Home | Away |

Košarkaški klub Sloga (Serbian Cyrillic: Кошаркашки клуб Cлoгa), commonly referred to as KK Sloga, is a men's professional basketball club based in Kraljevo, Serbia. The club plays in the Basketball League of Serbia. Their home arena is the Kraljevo Sports Hall.

Some of the club's star players over the years have included Vlade Divac and Ljubodrag Simonović.

== Sponsorship naming ==
Sloga has had several denominations through the years due to its sponsorship:

- Sloga Magnohrom: 1990–1991
- Sloga Telekom Srbija: 2000–2001
- Sloga Favorite BM: 2003–2004
- Sloga Société Générale: 2005–2007

== Identity ==
The main color of Sloga, since its foundation, is white. Because of it the Sloga players are often nicknamed Beli (transl. The Whites). Supporters of Sloga are Kasapi (transl. The Butchers) and they also support the football section of the Sloga Sports Society, FK Sloga Kraljevo.

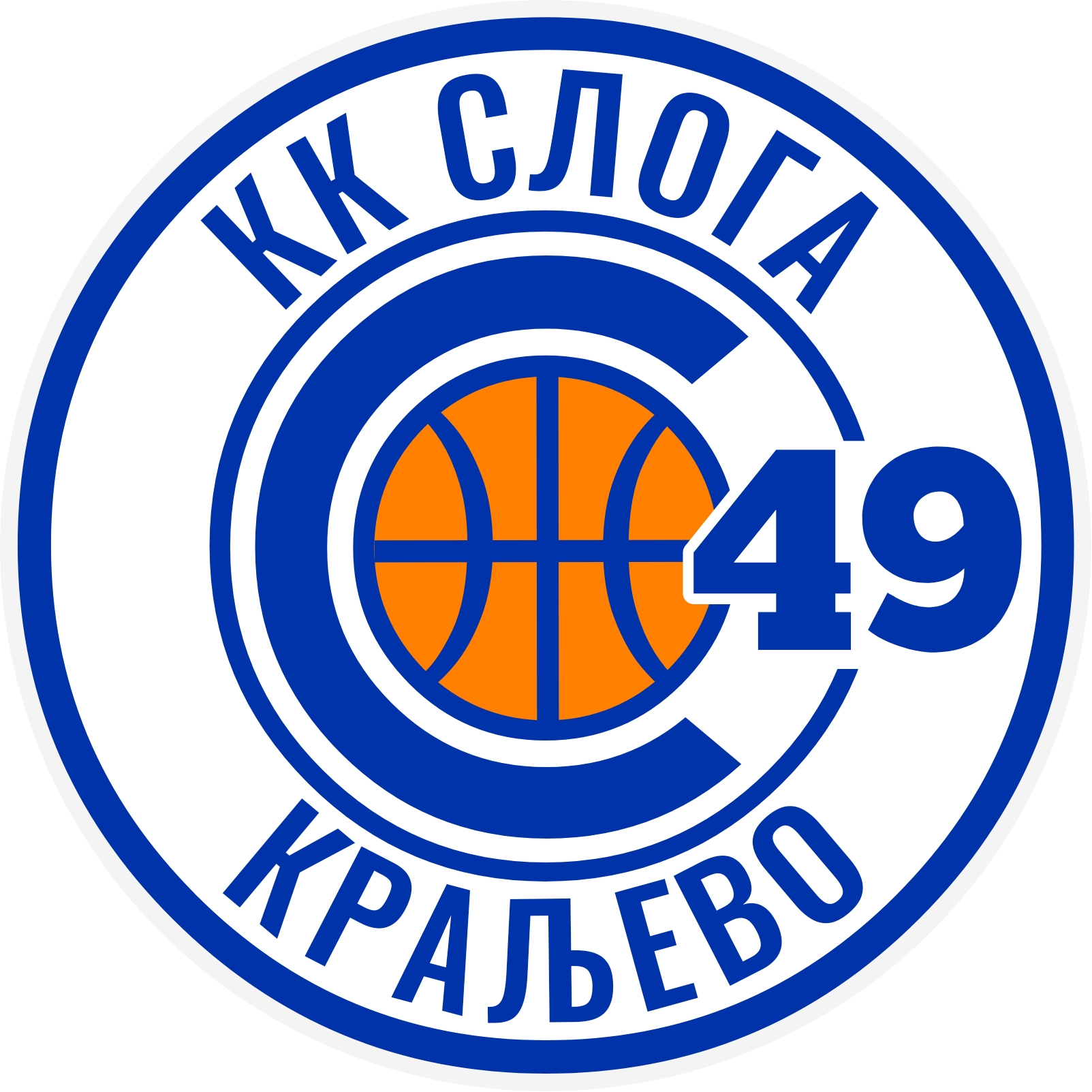
New concept of KK Sloga logo

== Home arena ==
Sloga plays its home games at the Kraljevo Sports Hall. The hall is located in Kraljevo and was built in 2015. It has a seating capacity of 3,331 seats.

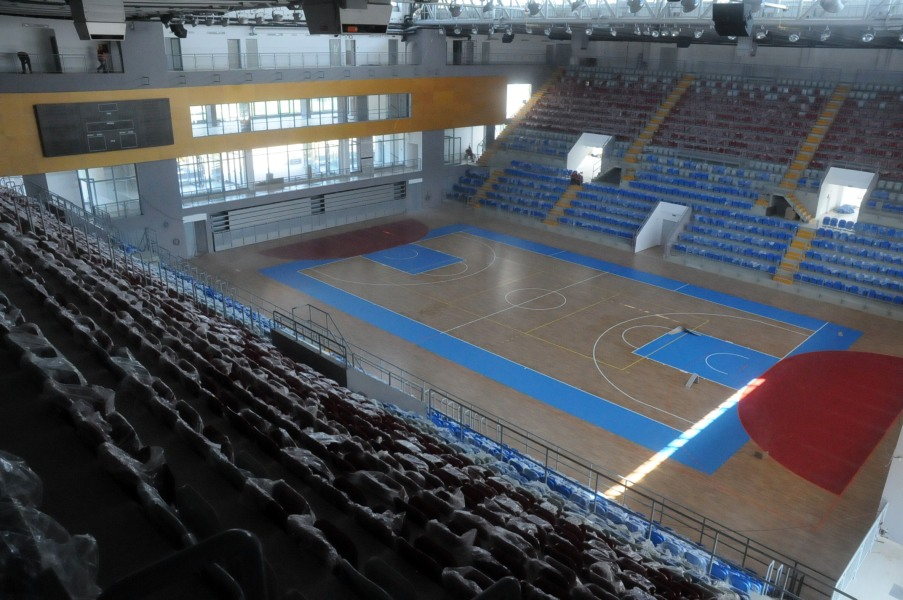
Kraljevo Sports Hall

== Players ==
=== Current roster ===
Note: Flags indicate national team eligibility at FIBA-sanctioned events. Players may hold other non-FIBA nationalities not displayed.

Sloga roster
Players
Coaches

| Pos. | No. | Nat. | Name | Ht. | Age |
|---|---|---|---|---|---|
| SF | 7 | (Serbia) | Matović, Stefan | 2.03 m (6 ft 8 in) | 35 – 3 March 1991 |
| G/F | 25 | (Serbia) | Simeunović, Đorđe | 2.02 m (6 ft 8 in) | 24 – 4 September 2002 |
| F | 44 | (Serbia) | Stamenić, Jovan | 1.97 m (6 ft 6 in) | 30 – 13 May 1996 |
| G | | (Bosnia and Herzegovina) | Nikolić, Nemanja | 1.96 m (6 ft 5 in) | 28 – 7 October 1998 |
| PG | | (Lebanon) | Khalil, Jad | 1.86 m (6 ft 1 in) | 29 – 20 November 1996 |
| G/F | | (United States) | Underwood, Dimitrius | 1.93 m (6 ft 4 in) |
| SG | | (Serbia) | Paunović, Zoran | 1.99 m (6 ft 6 in) | 26 – 19 July 2000 |
| PG | | (Bosnia and Herzegovina) | Bojanić, Andrej | 1.92 m (6 ft 4 in) | 24 – 11 July 2002 |
| PF | | (Bosnia and Herzegovina) | Đurović, Lazar | 2.02 m (6 ft 8 in) | 29 – 18 October 1997 |

Head coach

- (Serbia) Marko Dimitrijević

Legend

- (C) Team captain
- (TW) Two-way affiliate player
- Injured

- Roster
Updated: September 19, 2022

=== Hall of Famers and greatest players ===
Naismith Memorial Basketball Hall of Fame

Sloga Hall of Famers
Players
| No. | Name | Position | Tenure | Inducted |
|---|---|---|---|---|
| 12 | Vlade Divac | C | 1983–1986 | 2019 |

FIBA Hall of Fame

Sloga Hall of Famers
Players
| No. | Name | Position | Tenure | Inducted |
|---|---|---|---|---|
| 12 | Vlade Divac | C | 1983–1986 | 2010 |

FIBA's 50 Greatest Players

Sloga Players
| No. | Name | Position | Tenure | Inducted |
|---|---|---|---|---|
| 12 | Vlade Divac | C | 1983–1986 | 1991 |

== Coaches ==
- (Socialist Federal Republic of Yugoslavia) Milovan Bogojević (1990–1991)
- (Serbia and Montenegro) Gordan Marković (1991–1992)
- (Serbia and Montenegro) Rajko Toroman (1992)
- (Serbia and Montenegro) Gordan Marković (1993)
- (Serbia and Montenegro) Srboljub Đorđević (1994)
- (Serbia and Montenegro) Nenad Trajković (1995–1996)
- (Serbia and Montenegro) Dragan Kostić (2002–2003)
- (Serbia and Montenegro) Miodrag Kadija (2005–2006)
- (Serbia) Miloš Pejić (2006–2008)
- (Serbia) Dragan Kostić (2008–2009)
- (Serbia) Miloš Pejić (2009–2010)
- (Serbia) Bojan Kusmuk (2010–2011)
- (Serbia) Zoran Milovanović (2011–2013)
- (Serbia) Mihajlo Drobnjak (2013)
- (Serbia) Vladimir Đokić (2013–2014)
- (Serbia) Zoran Petrović (2014–2016)
- (Serbia) Dragan Kostić (2016)
- (Serbia) Boško Đokić (2016–2017)
- (Serbia) Bojan Kusmuk (2017)
- (Serbia) Mihajlo Drobnjak (2017–2018)
- (Serbia) Zoran Petrović (2018–2019)
- (Serbia) Saša Pavlović (2019–2020)
- (Serbia) Zoran Petrović (2020–2021)
- (Serbia) Dragan Kostić (2021)
- (Serbia) Marko Dimitrijević (2021–present)

== Trophies and awards ==
=== Awards ===
- BLS First League MVP
  - (Serbia) Miloš Bojović (1) – 2006–07
- BLS Super League MVP
  - (Serbia) Miloš Bojović (1) – 2006–07

== Notable players ==
Note: Flags indicate national team eligibility at FIBA-sanctioned events. Players may hold other non-FIBA nationalities not displayed.

Criteria

To appear in this section a player must have either:

- Set a club record or won an individual award while at the club
- Played at least one official international match for their national team at any time
- Played at least one official NBA match at any time.

- (Socialist Federal Republic of Yugoslavia) Vlade Divac
- (Socialist Federal Republic of Yugoslavia) Sreten Dragojlović
- (Socialist Federal Republic of Yugoslavia) Ljubodrag Simonović
- (Socialist Federal Republic of Yugoslavia) Dragan Todorić
- (Federal Republic of Yugoslavia) Miloš Babić
- (Federal Republic of Yugoslavia) Miloš Pejić
- (Serbia) Slobodan Božović
- (Serbia) Marko Dimitrijević
- (Serbia) Stefan Jović
- (Serbia) Dušan Miletić
- (Serbia) Vuk Radivojević
- (Bosnia and Herzegovina) Saša Vasiljević
- (Slovenia) Saša Dončić
