= List of current Basketball League of Serbia team rosters =

Below is a list of current rosters of teams from Basketball League of Serbia.

== First League ==
=== Čačak 94 ===
Note: Flags indicate national team eligibility at FIBA-sanctioned events. Players may hold other non-FIBA nationalities not displayed.

Čačak 94 roster
Players
Coaches

Pos.	No.	Nat.	Name	Ht.	Age
PG	4	(Serbia)	Pilčević, Radenko	1.87 m (6 ft 2 in)	38 – 15 December 1986
SG	5	(Serbia)	Ćurčić, Đorđe	1.88 m (6 ft 2 in)	20 – 10 July 2004
SF	6	(Serbia)	Popović, Matija	2.00 m (6 ft 7 in)	28 – 14 October 1996
G/F	7	(Serbia)	Gugović, Vuk	1.97 m (6 ft 6 in)	26 – 13 November 1998
SF	8	(United States)	Pulliam, Trey	195 m (639 ft 9 in)	26 – 7 July 1998
SG	9	(Serbia)	Tresač, Đorđe	1.93 m (6 ft 4 in)	37 – 9 December 1987
SG	10	(United States)	Daniels, Devon	1.98 m (6 ft 6 in)	26 – 18 June 1998
SG	11	(Serbia)	Radovanovic, Nikola	196 m (643 ft 1 in)	23–24 – Missing required parameter 1=month! 2001
SG	12	(Serbia)	Popović, Vuk	186 m (610 ft 3 in)	41 – 31 January 1984
F/C	13	(Serbia)	Majstorović, Đorđe	2.08 m (6 ft 10 in)	35 – 13 March 1990
			[[ | ]]
C	15	(Serbia)	Pantić, Mladen	2.10 m (6 ft 11 in)	42 – 31 July 1982
			[[ | ]]
PG		(Serbia)	Dumić, Filip	1.83 m (6 ft 0 in)	34 – 8 October 1990

Head coach

- (Serbia) Djordje Micic (basketball)

Assistant coach(es)

Marko Marinovic

Team manager

Kosta Nikitovic

Legend

- (C) Team captain
- Injured

- Roster
Updated: June 6, 2022

=== Dunav ===
Note: Flags indicate national team eligibility at FIBA-sanctioned events. Players may hold other non-FIBA nationalities not displayed.

Dunav roster
Players
Coaches

Pos.	No.	Nat.	Name	Ht.	Age
G/F	1	(Serbia)	Dobrašinović, Vuk	1.98 m (6 ft 6 in)	22 – 9 June 2002
PG	5	(Serbia)	Popović, Srđan	1.86 m (6 ft 1 in)	22 – 27 March 2003
PF	6	(Croatia)	Cvitković, Tomislav	2.06 m (6 ft 9 in)	26 – 19 May 1998
PG	9	(Serbia)	Malidžan, Vuk	1.88 m (6 ft 2 in)	37 – 14 January 1988
PG	10	(Serbia)	Milenković, Miloš	1.88 m (6 ft 2 in)	23 – 15 November 2001
SG	13	(Montenegro)	Jovanović, Đorđije (L)	1.97 m (6 ft 6 in)	21 – 15 May 2003
G	19	(Serbia)	Miljković, Aleksandar (C)	1.93 m (6 ft 4 in)	31 – 18 March 1994
PF	21	(Montenegro)	Grković, Marko	2.00 m (6 ft 7 in)	28 – 21 January 1997
PF	33	(Serbia)	Vukčević, Marko (L)	2.05 m (6 ft 9 in)	21 – 6 May 2003
F/C		(Serbia)	Krsmanović, Srđan	2.06 m (6 ft 9 in)	24 – 2 December 2000
PG		(Turkey)	Oktay, Alp	1.89 m (6 ft 2 in)	24 – 9 February 2001

Head coach

- (Serbia) Mitar Ašćerić

Assistant coach(es)

- (Serbia) Slobodan Adamović
- (Serbia) Aleksandar Vržina

Legend

- (C) Team captain
- (TW) Two-way affiliate player
- Injured

- Roster
Updated: June 16, 2022

=== Dynamic ===
Note: Flags indicate national team eligibility at FIBA-sanctioned events. Players may hold other non-FIBA nationalities not displayed.

Dynamic Belgrade roster
Players
Coaches

Pos.	No.	Nat.	Name	Ht.	Age
F	0	(Serbia)	Velimirović, Uroš	1.92 m (6 ft 4 in)	20 – 11 February 2005
PG	1	(Serbia)	Ristić, Aleksa	1.92 m (6 ft 4 in)	19 – 11 July 2005
F	2	(Serbia)	Romić, Ognjen	2.05 m (6 ft 9 in)	19 – 22 May 2005
PG	3	(Serbia)	Protić, Nemanja	1.82 m (6 ft 0 in)	38 – 13 August 1986
F	4	(Serbia)	Kostić, Nikola	1.99 m (6 ft 6 in)	31 – 28 June 1993
PF	6	(Serbia)	Lugić, Lazar	2.06 m (6 ft 9 in)	26 – 5 May 1998
G	11	(Serbia)	Petrović, Ilija	2.06 m (6 ft 9 in)	19 – 5 May 2005
F	12	(Serbia)	Lakić, Stefan	2.01 m (6 ft 7 in)	30 – 12 January 1995
F/C	15	(Serbia)	Nekić, Jovan	2.05 m (6 ft 9 in)	20 – 20 January 2005
C	19	(Serbia)	Malešević, Filip	2.17 m (7 ft 1 in)	19 – 15 August 2005
C	21	(Serbia)	Joksimović, Lazar	2.03 m (6 ft 8 in)	23 – 6 January 2002
F/C	23	(Serbia)	Dishman, DeAndre	1.98 m (6 ft 6 in)	27 – 1 January 1998
G	44	(Serbia)	Obradović, Rastko	1.96 m (6 ft 5 in)	17 – 1 August 2007

Head coach

- (Serbia) Nikola Marković

Assistant coach(es)

- (Serbia) Jovan Beader
- (Serbia) Božidar Babović
- (Serbia) Nemanja Jovićević

Legend

- (C) Team captain
- Injured

- Roster
Updated: January 3, 2023

=== Kolubara ===
Note: Flags indicate national team eligibility at FIBA-sanctioned events. Players may hold other non-FIBA nationalities not displayed.

KK Kolubara LA 2003 roster
Players
Coaches

Pos.	No.	Nat.	Name	Ht.	Age
G	1	(Serbia)	Živković, Vojislav	1.88 m (6 ft 2 in)	21 – 19 August 2003
PF	4	(Serbia)	Stojadinović, Marko	2.03 m (6 ft 8 in)	36 – 27 February 1989
PG	5	(Serbia)	Blagojević, Bogdan	1.88 m (6 ft 2 in)	21 – 17 December 2003
G	7	(Serbia)	Todorić, Mateja	1.90 m (6 ft 3 in)	26 – 10 August 1998
G/F	8	(Serbia)	Žunić, Matija	1.93 m (6 ft 4 in)	31 – 15 February 1994
SF	9	(Serbia)	Blagojević, Milić	2.01 m (6 ft 7 in)	34 – 10 January 1991
PG	10	(Serbia)	Simić, Nikola (C)	1.91 m (6 ft 3 in)	37 – 30 January 1988
PG	11	(United States)	Hannah, Supreme	1.83 m (6 ft 0 in)	30 – 17 May 1994
F/C	12	(Serbia)	Stojičić, Dušan	2.04 m (6 ft 8 in)	24 – 20 April 2001
SG	13	(Serbia)	Sinđelić, Vukašin	1.93 m (6 ft 4 in)	29 – 7 December 1995
C	14	(Serbia)	Andrejević, Stefan	2.09 m (6 ft 10 in)	31 – 3 August 1993
G	20	(Serbia)	Duvnjak, Uroš	1.91 m (6 ft 3 in)	38 – 19 November 1986
F/C	22	(Serbia)	Hadžifejzović, Sead	2.02 m (6 ft 8 in)	36 – 3 April 1989
SG	–	(Serbia)	Bačanac, Mihailo	1.88 m (6 ft 2 in)	21 – 25 May 2003
PF	–	(Bosnia and Herzegovina)	Pajić, Omar	2.06 m (6 ft 9 in)	25 – 24 August 1999
SF	–	(Serbia)	Grušanović, Mladen	2.02 m (6 ft 8 in)	28 – 3 March 1997

Head coach

- (Serbia) Darko Kostić

Legend

- (C) Team captain
- Injured

- Roster
Updated: July 24, 2022

=== Metalac ===
Note: Flags indicate national team eligibility at FIBA-sanctioned events. Players may hold other non-FIBA nationalities not displayed.

Metalac Valjevo roster
Players
Coaches

Pos.	No.	Nat.	Name	Ht.	Wt.	Age
G	1	(Serbia)	Bajić, Marko (C)	1.91 m (6 ft 3 in)	80 kg (176 lb)	23 – 12 November 2001
F	7	(Serbia)	Đuran, Filip	1.98 m (6 ft 6 in)	85 kg (187 lb)	33 – 9 July 1991
F/C	10	(Serbia)	Vuksanović, Saša	2.06 m (6 ft 9 in)	102 kg (225 lb)	27 – 14 May 1997
G	11	(New Zealand)	Cook-Green, Joe	1.85 m (6 ft 1 in)	84 kg (185 lb)	27 – 24 July 1997
G	13	(Serbia)	Novković, Matija	1.93 m (6 ft 4 in)	90 kg (198 lb)	28 – 28 April 1996
G	15	(United States)	Dye, Kenny	1.83 m (6 ft 0 in)	80 kg (176 lb)	24 – 7 July 2000
F	16	(Serbia)	Popović, Aleksa	2.05 m (6 ft 9 in)	100 kg (220 lb)	26 – 20 March 1999
F/C	25	(Serbia)	Lešić, Sava	2.05 m (6 ft 9 in)	101 kg (223 lb)	37 – 23 February 1988
G	26	(Serbia)	Janković, Nemanja	1.78 m (5 ft 10 in)	73 kg (161 lb)	22 – 1 November 2002
G/F	35	(United States)	Lyons, Tyrone	2.01 m (6 ft 7 in)	84 kg (185 lb)	24 – 22 September 2000
G/F	41	(Serbia)	Munižaba, Milan	1.97 m (6 ft 6 in)	90 kg (198 lb)	27 – 10 February 1998
G	44	(Serbia)	Teofilović, Aleksandar	1.80 m (5 ft 11 in)	79 kg (174 lb)	24 – 2 December 2000

Head coach

- (Serbia) Saša Milićević

Assistant coach(es)

- (Serbia) Radomir Simić

Legend

- (C) Team captain
- (TW) Two-way affiliate player
- Injured

- Roster
Updated: September 20, 2023

=== Mladost ===
Note: Flags indicate national team eligibility at FIBA-sanctioned events. Players may hold other non-FIBA nationalities not displayed.

Mladost MaxBet roster
Players
Coaches

Pos.	No.	Nat.	Name	Ht.	Age
PG	3	(Slovenia)	Klavžar, Nejc	1.87 m (6 ft 2 in)	26 – 21 March 1999
PG	6	(Serbia)	Milosavljević, Đorđe	1.83 m (6 ft 0 in)	30 – 31 August 1994
F	7	(Serbia)	Belić, Matija	2.00 m (6 ft 7 in)	21 – 16 May 2003
SG	9	(Serbia)	Milenković, Marko (C)	2.00 m (6 ft 7 in)	25 – 6 May 1999
PF	10	(Serbia)	Gavrilović, Strahinja	2.06 m (6 ft 9 in)	31 – 5 May 1993
C	12	(Republic of the Congo)	Oyona Ibandzo, David	2.10 m (6 ft 11 in)	21 – 8 February 2004
SF	13	(Serbia)	Kovačević, Nikola	2.02 m (6 ft 8 in)	25 – 12 August 1999
F/C	14	(Serbia)	Bojić, Andrija	2.08 m (6 ft 10 in)	31 – 28 May 1993
F/C	15	(Serbia)	Bjeličić, Kosta	2.05 m (6 ft 9 in)	19 – 5 July 2005
PF	34	(United States)	Carlson, Cody	2.06 m (6 ft 9 in)	26 – 17 November 1998
SF	35	(Serbia)	Živojinović, Petar	1.99 m (6 ft 6 in)	22 – 29 June 2002
PF	38	(The Gambia)	Sarr, Ousainou	2.10 m (6 ft 11 in)	22 – 6 June 2002
G		(United States)	Armstrong, Terry	1.97 m (6 ft 6 in)	24 – 16 July 2000
PG		(United States)	Davis, Jon	1.88 m (6 ft 2 in)	28 – 8 November 1996
SF		(Serbia)	Radovanović, Nikola (L)	2.04 m (6 ft 8 in)	22 – 13 March 2003

Head coach

- (Serbia) Marko Dimitrijević

Assistant coach(es)

- (Serbia) Predrag Savić
- (Serbia) Ljubomir Milentijev

Legend

- (C) Team captain
- (L) On loan
- (TW) Two-way affiliate player
- Injured

- Roster
Updated: June 13, 2022

=== Novi Pazar ===
Note: Flags indicate national team eligibility at FIBA-sanctioned events. Players may hold other non-FIBA nationalities not displayed.

OKK Novi Pazar roster
Players
Coaches

Pos.	No.	Nat.	Name	Ht.	Age
SF	0	(Serbia)	Majstorović, Dušan	1.95 m (6 ft 5 in)	29 – 11 August 1995
PG	1	(United States)	Green Jr., Wendell	1.80 m (5 ft 11 in)	22 – 7 August 2002
G	4	(Serbia)	Novković, Matija	1.93 m (6 ft 4 in)	28 – 24 August 1996
SF	6	(Serbia)	Milić, Željko		22 – 29 March 2003
C	7	(Serbia)	Numanović, Asmir (C)	2.08 m (6 ft 10 in)	34 – 2 April 1991
SG	8	(Serbia)	Kulundžić, Luka	1.94 m (6 ft 4 in)	20 – 11 November 2004
G	9	(Serbia)	Mikavica, Bogdan	1.94 m (6 ft 4 in)	25 – 9 October 1999
PF	11	(Bosnia and Herzegovina)	Manjgafić, Fahrudin	2.07 m (6 ft 9 in)	28 – 21 January 1997
C	13	(Serbia)	Muratović, Džejlan	2.05 m (6 ft 9 in)	29 – 16 January 1996
C	14	(Serbia)	Radomirović, Vladimir	2.06 m (6 ft 9 in)	25 – 11 January 2000
PG	20	(Serbia)	Eminbegović, Emin	1.86 m (6 ft 1 in)	24 – 30 March 2001
F/C	24	(Serbia)	Đulović, Enis	2.03 m (6 ft 8 in)	27 – 29 November 1997
	55	(Turkey)	Paltaci, Erbey		20 – 10 May 2004
SG	77	(Serbia)	Islamović, Altin	2.00 m (6 ft 7 in)	25 – 14 February 2000

Head coach

- (Montenegro) Vasilije Budimić

Assistant coach(es)

- (Serbia) Ivica Vukotić

Legend

- (C) Team captain
- (L) On loan
- (TW) Two-way affiliate player
- Injured

- Roster
Updated: December 31, 2021

=== OKK Beograd ===
Note: Flags indicate national team eligibility at FIBA-sanctioned events. Players may hold other non-FIBA nationalities not displayed.

OKK Beograd roster
Players
Coaches

Pos.	No.	Nat.	Name	Ht.	Age
SF	0	(Serbia)	Milenković, Aleksa (TW)	2.01 m (6 ft 7 in)	21 – 18 April 2004
SG	1	(Serbia)	Paunović, Luka	1.95 m (6 ft 5 in)	22 – 7 August 2002
PG	3	(Serbia)	Miljenović, Stefan	2.01 m (6 ft 7 in)	23 – 21 August 2001
PF	4	(Croatia)	Jelavić, Andrija	2.07 m (6 ft 9 in)	20 – 26 May 2004
PG	8	(Serbia)	Milutinović, Mihailo	1.91 m (6 ft 3 in)	22 – 21 March 2003
SF	9	(Serbia)	Paunović, Andrej	1.95 m (6 ft 5 in)
C	12	(Serbia)	Balaban, Darko	2.11 m (6 ft 11 in)	35 – 22 September 1989
C	14	(North Macedonia)	Samardžiski, Predrag	2.15 m (7 ft 1 in)	39 – 11 April 1986
PF	19	(Serbia)	Živković, Marko	2.03 m (6 ft 8 in)
SF	20	(Serbia)	Đulović, Asim	1.98 m (6 ft 6 in)	19 – 30 July 2005
C	21	(Serbia)	Jonović, Ahmet	2.13 m (7 ft 0 in)	21 – 11 December 2003
PG	24	(Serbia)	Labović, Danilo	1.92 m (6 ft 4 in)	21 – 26 July 2003
G	31	(Serbia)	Miljenovic, Nenad	1.94 m (6 ft 4 in)	32 – 8 April 1993
SF	88	(Slovakia)	Malovec, Timotej	2.04 m (6 ft 8 in)	21 – 25 April 2004
PF	–	(Montenegro)	Savović, Boris	2.10 m (6 ft 11 in)	37 – 18 June 1987
SF	–	(Serbia)	Vukadinović, Nemanja	1.92 m (6 ft 4 in)	20 – 9 August 2004
PG	–	(Serbia)	Topić, Nikola	1.98 m (6 ft 6 in)	19 – 10 August 2005

Head coach

- (Serbia) Vule Avdalović

Assistant coach(es)

- (Serbia) Veselin Petrović
- (Serbia) Srđan Flajs

Legend

- (C) Team captain
- (L) On loan
- (TW) Two-way affiliate player
- Injured

- Roster
Updated: January 10, 2023

=== Sloboda ===
Note: Flags indicate national team eligibility at FIBA-sanctioned events. Players may hold other non-FIBA nationalities not displayed.

Sloboda Užice roster
Players
Coaches

Pos.	No.	Nat.	Name	Ht.	Age
SF	3	(Serbia)	Prijović, Nedeljko	2.03 m (6 ft 8 in)	28 – 26 June 1996
C	4	(Serbia)	Bogićević, Petar	2.06 m (6 ft 9 in)	22 – 12 June 2002
SG	6	(Serbia)	Ćubić, Aleksa	2.02 m (6 ft 8 in)	24 – 30 April 2000
PF	7	(Slovenia)	Novak, Jan	2.00 m (6 ft 7 in)	29 – 7 July 1995
PG	9	(Serbia)	Aksentijević, Luka	1.87 m (6 ft 2 in)	23 – 22 January 2002
SG	10	(Serbia)	Božić, Đorđe	1.95 m (6 ft 5 in)	24 – 5 February 2001
F	11	(Serbia)	Blagojević, Nikola	2.01 m (6 ft 7 in)	23 – 8 February 2002
PF	12	(Serbia)	Ilić, Aleksa	2.05 m (6 ft 9 in)	24 – 11 May 2000
C	15	(Serbia)	Miladinović, David	2.09 m (6 ft 10 in)	27 – 18 May 1997
C	17	(Montenegro)	Matović, Radomir	2.16 m (7 ft 1 in)	24 – 23 August 2000
SF	18	(Serbia)	Matić, Čedomir	2.05 m (6 ft 9 in)	22 – 19 March 2003
PG	25	(Serbia)	Dimitrijević, Đorđe	1.88 m (6 ft 2 in)	28 – 6 February 1997

Head coach

- (Serbia) Oliver Popović

Legend

- (C) Team captain
- (L) On loan
- (TW) Two-way affiliate player
- Injured

- Roster
Updated: December 31, 2021

=== Sloga ===
Note: Flags indicate national team eligibility at FIBA-sanctioned events. Players may hold other non-FIBA nationalities not displayed.

Sloga roster
Players
Coaches

Pos.	No.	Nat.	Name	Ht.	Age
SF	7	(Serbia)	Matović, Stefan	2.03 m (6 ft 8 in)	34 – 3 March 1991
G/F	25	(Serbia)	Simeunović, Đorđe	2.02 m (6 ft 8 in)	22 – 4 September 2002
F	44	(Serbia)	Stamenić, Jovan	1.97 m (6 ft 6 in)	28 – 13 May 1996
G		(Bosnia and Herzegovina)	Nikolić, Nemanja	1.96 m (6 ft 5 in)	26 – 7 October 1998
PG		(Lebanon)	Khalil, Jad	1.86 m (6 ft 1 in)	28 – 20 November 1996
G/F		(United States)	Underwood, Dimitrius	1.93 m (6 ft 4 in)
SG		(Serbia)	Paunović, Zoran	1.99 m (6 ft 6 in)	24 – 19 July 2000
PG		(Bosnia and Herzegovina)	Bojanić, Andrej	1.92 m (6 ft 4 in)	22 – 11 July 2002
PF		(Bosnia and Herzegovina)	Đurović, Lazar	2.02 m (6 ft 8 in)	27 – 18 October 1997

Head coach

- (Serbia) Marko Dimitrijević

Legend

- (C) Team captain
- (TW) Two-way affiliate player
- Injured

- Roster
Updated: September 19, 2022

=== Spartak ===
Note: Flags indicate national team eligibility at FIBA-sanctioned events. Players may hold other non-FIBA nationalities not displayed.

Spartak Office Shoes roster
Players
Coaches

Pos.	No.	Nat.	Name	Ht.	Wt.	Age
G	2	(United States)	Gibson, Umoja	1.85 m (6 ft 1 in)	78 kg (172 lb)	26 – 4 July 1998
G/F	3	(Serbia)	Cerovina, Luka	2.01 m (6 ft 7 in)	99 kg (218 lb)	25 – 8 April 2000
G/F	8	(Serbia)	Momirov, Stefan	1.98 m (6 ft 6 in)	96 kg (212 lb)	25 – 18 December 1999
G	9	(Serbia)	Milisavljević, Miloš (C)	1.91 m (6 ft 3 in)	91 kg (201 lb)	31 – 7 September 1993
G	10	(Bosnia and Herzegovina) (Serbia)	Gordić, Nemanja	1.93 m (6 ft 4 in)	90 kg (198 lb)	36 – 25 September 1988
C	11	(Serbia)	Miletić, Dušan	2.13 m (7 ft 0 in)	103 kg (227 lb)	26 – 30 July 1998
F/C	13	(Serbia)	Medarević, Vojin	2.06 m (6 ft 9 in)	104 kg (229 lb)	22 – 7 June 2002
C	15	(Serbia)	Tejić, Marko	2.10 m (6 ft 11 in)	114 kg (251 lb)	29 – 4 August 1995
F/C	22	(Bosnia and Herzegovina) (Serbia)	Ilić, Dalibor	2.05 m (6 ft 9 in)	94 kg (207 lb)	25 – 4 March 2000
G	32	(Canada) (Jamaica)	Kajami-Keane, Kaza	1.88 m (6 ft 2 in)	84 kg (185 lb)	31 – 27 January 1994
PF	34	(Montenegro)	Nikolić, Danilo	2.06 m (6 ft 9 in)	93 kg (205 lb)	32 – 8 April 1993
PG	45	(United States)	Bolton, Rasir	1.90 m (6 ft 3 in)	84 kg (185 lb)	25 – 27 September 1999

Head coach

- (Serbia) Vlada Jovanović

Assistant coach(es)

- (Serbia) Slobodan Ljubotina
- (Serbia) Đorđe Varagić

Legend

- (C) Team captain
- Injured

- Roster
Updated: April 1, 2025

=== Tamiš ===
Note: Flags indicate national team eligibility at FIBA-sanctioned events. Players may hold other non-FIBA nationalities not displayed.

KK Tamiš roster
Players
Coaches

Pos.	No.	Nat.	Name	Ht.	Age
PG	3	(Serbia)	Vidić, Milutin	1.90 m (6 ft 3 in)	21 – 8 January 2004
SG	4	(Serbia)	Solomun, Ivan	1.95 m (6 ft 5 in)	23 – 11 March 2002
C	5	(Serbia)	Lugić, Lazar	2.08 m (6 ft 10 in)	26 – 5 May 1998
C	6	(Georgia (country))	Bakradze, Giorgi	2.06 m (6 ft 9 in)	30 – 25 June 1994
PG	8	(Serbia)	Radović, Saša (C)	1.80 m (5 ft 11 in)	29 – 21 August 1995
F	10	(Serbia)	Šinik, Marko	1.88 m (6 ft 2 in)	26 – 11 December 1998
C	12	(Serbia)	Pavićević, Filip	2.07 m (6 ft 9 in)	25 – 1 May 1999
SG	13	(Serbia)	Strinić, Mateja	1.95 m (6 ft 5 in)	24 – 18 September 2000
PF	15	(Serbia)	Kovačević, Vasilije	2.05 m (6 ft 9 in)	24 – 11 January 2001
SF	16	(Serbia)	Smiljanić, Ivan	1.99 m (6 ft 6 in)	36 – 4 April 1989
C	26	(Serbia)	Ostojić, Goran	2.06 m (6 ft 9 in)	34 – 10 January 1991
SG	31	(Serbia)	Terzić, Branislav	1.96 m (6 ft 5 in)	27 – 22 December 1997
G/F	35	(Serbia)	Đorđević, Dimitrije	1.92 m (6 ft 4 in)	24 – 2 August 2000
C	–	(Serbia)	Todorović, Mihailo	2.10 m (6 ft 11 in)	29 – 9 July 1995
PF	–	(Serbia)	Pantović, Ognjen	2.01 m (6 ft 7 in)	28 – 3 June 1996
C	–	(Serbia)	Kojadinović, Aleksa	2.07 m (6 ft 9 in)	26 – 27 July 1998
PG	–	(United States)	Nicholas, Josh	1.90 m (6 ft 3 in)	26 – 16 August 1998

Head coach

- (Serbia) Bojan Jovičić

Assistant coach(es)

- (Serbia) Zoran Topić
- (Serbia) Lazar Dejanović

Legend

- (C) Team captain
- (L) On loan
- (TW) Two-way affiliate player
- Injured

- Roster
Updated: August 3, 2022

=== Vojvodina ===
Note: Flags indicate national team eligibility at FIBA-sanctioned events. Players may hold other non-FIBA nationalities not displayed.

KK Vojvodina roster
Players
Coaches

Pos.	No.	Nat.	Name	Ht.	Age
PF	0	(Serbia)	Rebrača, Filip	2.06 m (6 ft 9 in)	27 – 3 September 1997
SG	2	(Serbia)	Banjac, Uroš	1.97 m (6 ft 6 in)	24 – 21 March 2001
PG	5	(Serbia)	Ljubičić, Marko	1.95 m (6 ft 5 in)	37 – 23 July 1987
SG	7	(Serbia)	Ašćerić, Luka	2.01 m (6 ft 7 in)	28 – 10 January 1997
G	10	(Serbia)	Bumbić, Boško	1.91 m (6 ft 3 in)	24 – 27 February 2001
PG	11	(United States)	Smith, Scoochie	1.88 m (6 ft 2 in)	30 – 11 November 1994
PF	13	(Serbia)	Savić, Stefan	2.00 m (6 ft 7 in)	29 – 13 December 1995
PF	–	(Serbia)	Ristanović, Andrija	2.11 m (6 ft 11 in)	26 – 12 July 1998
SG	–	(Serbia)	Pešaković, Nikola	1.93 m (6 ft 4 in)	34 – 23 April 1991
G	–	(Serbia)	Jovović, Koča	1.87 m (6 ft 2 in)	31 – 26 May 1993
SG	–	(Bosnia and Herzegovina)	Živković, Nemanja	1.96 m (6 ft 5 in)	25 – 25 May 1999
C	–	(Serbia)	Čampara, Ljubomir	2.03 m (6 ft 8 in)	31 – 29 August 1993
PG	–	(Serbia)	Mitrović, Stefan	1.89 m (6 ft 2 in)	30 – 28 August 1994

Head coach

- (Serbia) Miloš Isakov Kovačević

Assistant coach(es)

- (Serbia) Stefan Škripac

Legend

- (C) Team captain
- Injured

- Roster
Updated: 23 August 2022

=== Vršac ===
Note: Flags indicate national team eligibility at FIBA-sanctioned events. Players may hold other non-FIBA nationalities not displayed.

KK Vršac roster
Players
Coaches

Pos.	No.	Nat.	Name	Ht.	Age
SG	0	(Serbia)	Radovanović, Nikola	1.95 m (6 ft 5 in)	23 – 29 May 2001
PG	2	(Serbia)	Mićović, Ognjen	1.87 m (6 ft 2 in)	25 – 10 March 2000
PG	4	(Serbia)	Dukić, Marko	1.90 m (6 ft 3 in)	23 – 9 December 2001
F	6	(Serbia)	Jovanović, Luka	2.03 m (6 ft 8 in)	24 – 4 June 2000
PG	8	(Serbia)	Jovanović, Slobodan	1.93 m (6 ft 4 in)	28 – 19 February 1997
F	9	(Serbia)	Agoč, Stegan	2.01 m (6 ft 7 in)	22 – 27 May 2002
SG	13	(Slovenia)	Jurček, Žiga	1.96 m (6 ft 5 in)	27 – 22 April 1998
F	15	(Serbia)	Vasiljević, Toma	2.05 m (6 ft 9 in)	24 – 7 October 2000
SF	16	(Serbia)	Tomić, David	1.98 m (6 ft 6 in)	20 – 14 July 2004
SG	17	(Serbia)	Dimić, Miloš	1.94 m (6 ft 4 in)	35 – 17 October 1989
PG	22	(Serbia)	Milić, Andrija	1.82 m (6 ft 0 in)	22 – 2 September 2002
F/C	31	(Serbia)	Jeković, Bratislav	2.02 m (6 ft 8 in)	28 – 31 August 1996
SG	67	(Serbia)	Majstorović, Mateja	1.88 m (6 ft 2 in)	21 – 4 August 2003
PG	77	(Serbia)	Nikolić, Miloš	1.86 m (6 ft 1 in)	28 – 17 October 1996
C	88	(Serbia)	Juzbašić, Dušan	2.07 m (6 ft 9 in)	26 – 8 June 1998
SG		(Serbia)	Simić, Stefan	1.96 m (6 ft 5 in)	29 – 3 January 1996
PG		(Serbia)	Vasić, Lazar (L)	1.91 m (6 ft 3 in)	24 – 3 January 2001
SG		(Serbia)	Radović, Matija	2.01 m (6 ft 7 in)	27 – 25 April 1998

Head coach

- (Serbia) Vladimir Đokić

Assistant coach(es)

- (Serbia) Marko Lalić

Legend

- (C) Team captain
- (TW) Two-way affiliate player
- Injured

- Roster
Updated: August 24, 2022

=== Zdravlje ===
Note: Flags indicate national team eligibility at FIBA-sanctioned events. Players may hold other non-FIBA nationalities not displayed.

Zdravlje Leskovac roster
Players
Coaches

Pos.	No.	Nat.	Name	Ht.	Age
G	1	(Serbia)	Cekić, Nikola	1.90 m (6 ft 3 in)	24 – 18 December 2000
PG	3	(Serbia)	Stojković, Strahinja	1.83 m (6 ft 0 in)	27 – 20 May 1997
SG	4	(Serbia)	Jović, Dragomir	1.90 m (6 ft 3 in)	31 – 31 January 1994
F	5	(United States)	Hudson, Cornelius	2.01 m (6 ft 7 in)	31 – 29 December 1993
SG	7	(Serbia)	Petković, Miloš	1.88 m (6 ft 2 in)	25 – 18 September 1999
G/F	8	(Serbia)	Đokić, Đorđe	1.96 m (6 ft 5 in)	19 – 8 August 2005
SG	10	(Serbia)	Radivojević, Milan (C)	1.91 m (6 ft 3 in)	35 – 22 September 1989
PF	11	(Serbia)	Mitić, Nikola	2.01 m (6 ft 7 in)	19 – 21 December 2005
PF	12	(Serbia)	Stamenković, Svetozar	2.06 m (6 ft 9 in)	34 – 28 October 1990
PF	15	(Serbia)	Stajić, Vojislav	1.99 m (6 ft 6 in)	27 – 4 February 1998
PF	21	(Serbia)	Jovanović, Stevan	2.01 m (6 ft 7 in)	24 – 10 January 2001
G/F	24	(Serbia)	Jović, Miloš	1.95 m (6 ft 5 in)	27 – 28 August 1997
PG	55	(United States)	Blackwell, Noah	1.90 m (6 ft 3 in)	29 – 19 April 1996
PF	99	(Serbia)	Bjelak, Eldan	1.99 m (6 ft 6 in)	29 – 27 May 1995
PF	-	(Jamaica)	Morgan, Duana	1.98 m (6 ft 6 in)	31 – 24 July 1993
F	-	(United States)	Lampkin, Jacob	2.06 m (6 ft 9 in)

Head coach

- (Serbia) Nikola Ristić

Assistant coach(es)

- (Serbia) Predrag Tasić

Legend

- (C) Team captain
- Injured

- Roster
Updated: August 11, 2022

=== Zlatibor ===
Note: Flags indicate national team eligibility at FIBA-sanctioned events. Players may hold other non-FIBA nationalities not displayed.

KK Zlatibor roster
Players
Coaches

Pos.	No.	Nat.	Name	Ht.	Age
PF	44	(Serbia)	Curcic, Vasilije	2.06 m (6 ft 9 in)	33 – 11 October 1991
PG	3	(Serbia)	Protić, Nemanja	1.82 m (6 ft 0 in)	38 – 13 August 1986
PF	4	(Serbia)	Čabrilo, Aleksa	2.06 m (6 ft 9 in)	27 – 16 November 1997
SF	7	(Serbia)	Đuran, Filip	1.98 m (6 ft 6 in)	33 – 4 July 1991
SG	9	(Slovenia)	Grubelič, Sandi	1.96 m (6 ft 5 in)	30 – 3 October 1994
SG	10	(Serbia)	Đukanović, Brano	1.96 m (6 ft 5 in)	30 – 21 March 1995
C	11	(Serbia)	Milošević, Lazar	2.05 m (6 ft 9 in)	21 – 8 April 2004
F	13	(Serbia)	Matović, Andrija	1.98 m (6 ft 6 in)	21 – 25 September 2003
SF	21	(Serbia)	Joksimović, Lazar	2.03 m (6 ft 8 in)	23 – 6 January 2002
PG	22	(Serbia)	Tadić, Tadija	1.94 m (6 ft 4 in)	26 – 22 April 1999
SG	24	(Serbia)	Ponjavić, Aleksandar	2.00 m (6 ft 7 in)	34 – 3 March 1991
SG	33	(Serbia)	Čorbić, Boško	1.91 m (6 ft 3 in)	29 – 9 August 1995
F/C	35	(Serbia)	Tejić, Marko	2.10 m (6 ft 11 in)	29 – 4 August 1995
PG	44	(Serbia)	Tejić, Bogdan	1.90 m (6 ft 3 in)	24 – 18 January 2001

Head coach

- (Serbia) Strajin Nedović

Legend

- (C) Team captain
- Injured

- Roster
Updated: December 9, 2022

== Super League ==
=== Borac Čačak ===
Note: Flags indicate national team eligibility at FIBA-sanctioned events. Players may hold other non-FIBA nationalities not displayed.

Borac Čačak roster
Players
Coaches

Pos.	No.	Nat.	Name	Ht.		Age
PG	4	(Serbia)	Radović, Petar (TW)	1.80 m (5 ft 11 in)		17 – 5 November 2007
F	9	(Serbia)	Nikolić, Pavle	2.01 m (6 ft 7 in)		19 – 4 September 2005
G	0	(United States)	Davidson, Keishawn	1.88 m (6 ft 2 in)	79 kg (174 lb)	24 – 1 March 2001
F	10	(Serbia)	Jošilo, Marko (C)	2.00 m (6 ft 7 in)		32 – 16 October 1992
F	12	(Lithuania)	Furmanavičius, Justas	199 m (652 ft 11 in)	95 kg (209 lb)	30 – 14 September 1994
SG	44	(Serbia)	Čarapić, Uroš (C)	1.95 m (6 ft 5 in)		28 – 24 September 1996
SG	11	(Serbia)	Ćurčić, Đorđe	1.95 m (6 ft 5 in)		20 – 17 April 2005
C	5	(Serbia)	Pavićević, Marko	2.09 m (6 ft 10 in)		23 – 8 May 2001
SF	55	(Serbia)	Manojlović, Nikola	2.01 m (6 ft 7 in)		23 – 14 February 2002
C	41	(Serbia)	Gagić, Đorđe	2.10 m (6 ft 11 in)	130 kg (287 lb)	34 – 28 December 1990
PG	3	(United States)	Baldwin, Diante	1.83 m (6 ft 0 in)	82 kg (181 lb)	30 – 17 October 1994
G	66	(Lithuania)	Valinskas, Paulius	1.91 m (6 ft 3 in)	85 kg (187 lb)	29 – 9 December 1995

Head coach

- (Serbia) Saša Ocokoljić

Assistant coach(es)

- (Serbia) Miloš Pejanović
- (Serbia) Miroslav Milić

Team manager

- (Serbia) Marko Ivanović

Legend

- (C) Team captain
- (TW) Two-way affiliate player
- Injured

- Roster
Updated: January 10, 2023

=== Crvena zvezda mts ===
Note: Flags indicate national team eligibility at FIBA-sanctioned events. Players may hold other non-FIBA nationalities not displayed.

Crvena zvezda Meridianbet roster
Players
Coaches

Pos.	No.	Nat.	Name	Ht.	Wt.	Age
PG	0	(United States) (Bulgaria)	Miller-McIntyre, Codi	1.91 m (6 ft 3 in)	90 kg (198 lb)	30 – 1 June 1994
PF	1	(United States)	Brown, John	2.03 m (6 ft 8 in)	98 kg (216 lb)	33 – 28 January 1992
SG	3	(United States)	Canaan, Isaiah	1.83 m (6 ft 0 in)	91 kg (201 lb)	33 – 21 May 1991
G	4	(Serbia)	Teodosić, Miloš	1.96 m (6 ft 5 in)	90 kg (198 lb)	38 – 19 March 1987
F	7	(Serbia)	Davidovac, Dejan	2.03 m (6 ft 8 in)	95 kg (209 lb)	30 – 17 January 1995
F/C	9	(Serbia)	Mitrović, Luka	2.06 m (6 ft 9 in)	110 kg (243 lb)	32 – 21 March 1993
G/F	10	(Serbia)	Lazić, Branko (C)	1.95 m (6 ft 5 in)	91 kg (201 lb)	36 – 12 January 1989
F	12	(Serbia)	Kalinić, Nikola	2.03 m (6 ft 8 in)	105 kg (231 lb)	33 – 8 November 1991
G/F	13	(Serbia)	Dobrić, Ognjen	2.00 m (6 ft 7 in)	93 kg (205 lb)	30 – 27 October 1994
C	21	(United States) (Russia)	Bolomboy, Joel	2.06 m (6 ft 9 in)	106 kg (234 lb)	31 – 28 January 1994
PF	24	(United States)	Daum, Mike	2.06 m (6 ft 9 in)	107 kg (236 lb)	29 – 30 October 1995
F/C	30	(Serbia)	Petrušev, Filip	2.11 m (6 ft 11 in)	106 kg (234 lb)	25 – 15 April 2000
SF	31	(Lithuania)	Giedraitis, Rokas	2.01 m (6 ft 7 in)	88 kg (194 lb)	32 – 16 August 1992
SG	36	(Serbia)	Nedović, Nemanja	1.91 m (6 ft 3 in)	87 kg (192 lb)	33 – 16 June 1991
G/F	47	(Serbia)	Kostić, Andrej	1.98 m (6 ft 6 in)	88 kg (194 lb)	18 – 2 November 2006
PG	99	(Brazil)	dos Santos, Yago	1.75 m (5 ft 9 in)	70 kg (154 lb)	26 – 9 March 1999

Head coach

- (Greece) Ioannis Sfairopoulos

Assistant coach(es)

- (Greece) Vasileios Geragotellis
- (Serbia) Tomislav Tomović
- (Serbia) Đorđe Lazarević
- (Serbia) Mladen Manojlović
- (Serbia) Miloš Vuletić

Strength & conditioning coach(es)

- (Serbia) Vladan Radonjić
- (Serbia) Igor Tomašević

Team manager

- (Serbia) Nebojša Ilić

Legend

- (C) Team captain
- Injured

- Roster
Updated: December 27, 2024

=== FMP ===
Note: Flags indicate national team eligibility at FIBA-sanctioned events. Players may hold other non-FIBA nationalities not displayed.

FMP Meridian roster
Players
Coaches

Pos.	No.	Nat.	Name	Ht.	Age
PG	0	(Slovenia)	Rebec, Matic	1.81 m (5 ft 11 in)	30 – 24 January 1995
SG	3	(Montenegro)	Popović, Petar	1.95 m (6 ft 5 in)	28 – 13 September 1996
G/F	10	(Serbia)	Šaranović, Nikola	2.00 m (6 ft 7 in)	21 – 20 August 2003
SF	11	(Serbia)	Simović, Ranko	2.03 m (6 ft 8 in)	25 – 7 June 1999
G/F	12	(Serbia)	Matović, Ognjen	1.98 m (6 ft 6 in)	20 – 8 August 2004
F	13	(Montenegro)	Tomašević, Bojan	2.01 m (6 ft 7 in)	23 – 20 June 2001
C	14	(Serbia)	Gašić, Nikola	2.12 m (6 ft 11 in)	23 – 17 November 2001
F	15	(Serbia)	Radosavljević, Dušan	2.03 m (6 ft 8 in)	23 – 3 November 2001
PF	22	(Serbia)	Stanojević, Aleksa	2.04 m (6 ft 8 in)	18 – 2 September 2006
SG	23	(Serbia)	Stojanović, Vojislav	1.96 m (6 ft 5 in)	28 – 14 April 1997
C	32	(Serbia)	Kuzmić, Ognjen	2.13 m (7 ft 0 in)	34 – 16 May 1990
F	73	(Serbia)	Lazarević, Stefan	1.81 m (5 ft 11 in)	28 – 20 August 1996
F	88	(Serbia)	Barna, Filip	2.01 m (6 ft 7 in)	25 – 5 December 1999

Head coach

- (Serbia) Saša Nikitović

Assistant coach(es)

- (Serbia) Goran Tadić
- (Serbia) Goran Topić

Strength & conditioning coach(es)

- (Serbia) Feđa Sretenović

Legend

- (C) Team captain
- (L) On loan
- Injured

- Roster
Updated: 18 November 2024

=== Mega Basket ===
Note: Flags indicate national team eligibility at FIBA-sanctioned events. Players may hold other non-FIBA nationalities not displayed.

Mega Superbet roster
Players
Coaches

Pos.	No.	Nat.	Name	Ht.	Age
F	0	(Serbia)	Milenković, Aleksa	2.04 m (6 ft 8 in)	21 – 18 April 2004
PG	1	(Bosnia and Herzegovina) (Serbia)	Kondić, Kosta	1.93 m (6 ft 4 in)	23 – 5 August 2001
PG	3	(Serbia)	Miljenović, Stefan	1.93 m (6 ft 4 in)	23 – 21 August 2001
PF	4	(Croatia)	Jelavić, Andrija	2.07 m (6 ft 9 in)	20 – 26 May 2004
PF	5	(Serbia)	Vukčević, Marko	2.04 m (6 ft 8 in)	21 – 6 May 2003
F	6	(Serbia)	Marković, Bogoljub	2.10 m (6 ft 11 in)	19 – 12 July 2005
PG	7	(Germany)	Kayil, Jack	1.93 m (6 ft 4 in)	19 – 27 January 2006
SG	8	(Slovenia)	Kroflič, Urban	1.98 m (6 ft 6 in)	19 – 28 March 2006
F	9	(Slovenia)	Macura, Sergej	2.04 m (6 ft 8 in)	21 – 10 April 2004
PG	10	(Serbia)	Milijašević, Ilija	1.89 m (6 ft 2 in)	21 – 6 February 2004
PG	11	(Serbia)	Milutinović, Mihailo	1.91 m (6 ft 3 in)	22 – 21 March 2003
PG	24	(Romania)	Illes, Luca (L)	1.94 m (6 ft 4 in)	18 – 8 January 2007
PF	34	(Bosnia and Herzegovina) (Serbia)	Jović, Filip	2.05 m (6 ft 9 in)	20 – 1 February 2005
C	44	(Serbia)	Tanasković, Dušan	2.08 m (6 ft 10 in)	24 – 23 February 2001
PG	77	(Serbia)	Petrović, Mihailo	1.90 m (6 ft 3 in)	22 – 23 February 2003
SF	88	(Slovakia)	Malovec, Timotej	2.04 m (6 ft 8 in)	21 – 25 April 2004

Head coach

- (Serbia) Marko Barać

Assistant coach(es)

- (Serbia) Miloš Mitrović
- (Serbia) Branislav Božović
- (Serbia) Petar Radonjić
- (Serbia) Nikola Milojević

Team manager

- (Serbia) Novica Veličković

Legend

- (C) Team captain
- (L) On loan
- (TW) Two-way affiliate player
- Injured

- Roster
- Transactions
Updated: April 15, 2025

=== Partizan NIS ===
Note: Flags indicate national team eligibility at FIBA-sanctioned events. Players may hold other non-FIBA nationalities not displayed.

Partizan Mozzart Bet roster
Players
Coaches

Pos.	No.	Nat.	Name	Ht.	Wt.	Age
C	0	(United States) (Uganda)	Davies, Brandon	2.08 m (6 ft 10 in)	109 kg (240 lb)	33 – 25 July 1991
G	1	(Denmark)	Lundberg, Gabriel	1.93 m (6 ft 4 in)	92 kg (203 lb)	30 – 4 December 1994
PG	2	(United States) (South Sudan)	Jones, Carlik	1.83 m (6 ft 0 in)	81 kg (179 lb)	27 – 23 December 1997
G	3	(France) (Rwanda)	Ntilikina, Frank	1.93 m (6 ft 4 in)	91 kg (201 lb)	26 – 28 July 1998
G	4	(Germany) (United States)	Washington Jr., Duane	1.88 m (6 ft 2 in)	89 kg (196 lb)	25 – 24 March 2000
C	5	(Serbia)	Koprivica, Balša	2.16 m (7 ft 1 in)	109 kg (240 lb)	24 – 1 May 2000
SF	7	(Serbia) (Croatia)	Nakić, Mario	2.02 m (6 ft 8 in)	99 kg (218 lb)	23 – 14 June 2001
G/F	8	(Serbia)	Bošnjaković, Mitar	2.00 m (6 ft 7 in)	94 kg (207 lb)	18 – 24 August 2006
G/F	9	(Serbia)	Marinković, Vanja (C)	1.99 m (6 ft 6 in)	85 kg (187 lb)	28 – 9 January 1997
PF	11	(Serbia)	Pokuševski, Aleksej	2.13 m (7 ft 0 in)	95 kg (209 lb)	23 – 26 December 2001
G/F	12	(United States)	Brown, Sterling	1.96 m (6 ft 5 in)	99 kg (218 lb)	30 – 10 February 1995
F	17	(Germany) (Democratic Republic of the Congo)	Bonga, Isaac	2.03 m (6 ft 8 in)	82 kg (181 lb)	25 – 8 November 1999
G/F	19	(Serbia)	Lakić, Arijan	1.98 m (6 ft 6 in)	82 kg (181 lb)	25 – 20 January 2000
G	21	(Serbia)	Šekularac, Đorđe (Y)	1.98 m (6 ft 6 in)		17 – 23 July 2007
PF	24	(Canada)	Mike, Isiaha	2.03 m (6 ft 8 in)	98 kg (216 lb)	27 – 11 August 1997
G/F	44	(Serbia)	Danilović, Uroš (Y)	2.01 m (6 ft 7 in)		17 – 15 September 2007
C	88	(United States)	Jones, Tyrique	2.06 m (6 ft 9 in)	108 kg (238 lb)	27 – 3 May 1997
G/F		(Serbia)	Isailović, Stefan (Y)	2.02 m (6 ft 8 in)		18 – 14 February 2007

Head coach

- (Serbia) Željko Obradović

Assistant coach(es)

- (Serbia) Vladimir Androić
- (Spain) Josep Maria Izquierdo
- (Serbia) Bogdan Karaičić
- (Serbia) Aleksandar Matović

Athletic trainer(s)

- (Serbia) Predrag Zimonjić

Team manager

- (Serbia) Luka Vulikić

Legend

- (C) Team captain
- (Y) Youth player
- Injured

- Roster
- Transactions
Updated: December 5, 2024

== See also ==
- List of current ABA Liga team rosters
- List of foreign basketball players in Serbia
