= 2022 ABA League Second Division Playoffs =

Basketball league play-offs

Tournament details
- City: Skopje
- Dates: 13–17 April 2022
- Season: 2021–22
- Teams: 8
- Defending champions: Studentski centar

Final positions
- Champions: Zlatibor (1st title)
- Runners-up: MZT Skopje Aerodrom
- Semifinalists: Borac Banja Luka; Široki

Awards
- Best player: Dušan Kutlešić (Zlatibor)

The 2022 ABA League Second Division Playoffs is the basketball play-off tournament that decides the winner of the 2021–22 ABA League Second Division season. The winner of the play-offs qualifies for the 2022–23 ABA League First Division.

== Qualified teams ==
1. (North Macedonia) MZT Skopje Aerodrom (final)
2. (Slovenia) Helios Suns (quarterfinals)
3. (Bosnia and Herzegovina) Borac Banja Luka (semifinals)
4. (Bosnia and Herzegovina) Široki (semifinals)
5. (Bosnia and Herzegovina) Spars Ilidža (quarterfinals)
6. (Serbia) Mladost MaxBet (quarterfinals)
7. (Serbia) Zlatibor (champion)
8. (Montenegro) Sutjeska (quarterfinals)

== Venue ==
In April 2021, it was announced that the Playoffs will be played in Skopje, North Macedonia.

| Skopje | 2022 ABA League Second Division Playoffs (Yugoslavia) |
| Jane Sandanski Arena | 2022 ABA League Second Division Playoffs (Yugoslavia) |
| Capacity: 7,500 | 2022 ABA League Second Division Playoffs (Yugoslavia) |

== Bracket ==
Knock-out elimination phases were played under single-game format.

Quarterfinals
13 April 2022
3 (Bosnia and Herzegovina) Borac Banja Luka | 80
6 (Serbia) Mladost MaxBet | 79
13 April 2022
2 (Slovenia) Helios Suns | 82
7 (Serbia) Zlatibor | 84
13 April 2022
4 (Bosnia and Herzegovina) Široki | 85
5 (Bosnia and Herzegovina) Spars Ilidža | 81
13 April 2022
1 (North Macedonia) MZT Skopje Aerodrom | 73
8 (Montenegro) Sutjeska | 68

Semifinals
15 April 2022
3 (Bosnia and Herzegovina) Borac Banja Luka | 83
7 (Serbia) Zlatibor | 98
15 April 2022
4 (Bosnia and Herzegovina) Široki | 71
1 (North Macedonia) MZT Skopje Aerodrom | 75

Final
17 April 2022
7 (Serbia) Zlatibor (OT) | 78
1 (North Macedonia) MZT Skopje Aerodrom | 73

== Quarterfinals ==
Quarterfinals were played on 13 April 2022.

13 April 2022
12:00

Boxscore

| Borac Banja Luka (Bosnia and Herzegovina) | 80–79 | (Serbia) Mladost MaxBet |
Scoring by quarter: 17–11, 26–22, 22–20, 15–26
| Pts: Diante Baldwin 18; Rebs: Radoš Šešlija 11; Asts: Diante Baldwin 6 | | Pts: Strahinja Gavrilović 26; Rebs: Strahinja Gavrilović 17; Asts: Nejc Klavžar 8 |

Jane Sandanski Arena, Skopje
Attendance: 100
Referees: Milivoje Jovčić, Nermin Nikšić, Aleksandar Davidov

13 April 2022
15:00

Boxscore

| Helios Suns (Slovenia) | 82–84 | (Serbia) Zlatibor |
Scoring by quarter: 17–18, 20–21, 20–19, 25–26
| Pts: Blaž Mahkovic 18; Rebs: Jois, Šantelj 7 each Asts: Leon Šantelj 4 | | Pts: Dimitrije Nikolić 22; Rebs: Dimitrije Nikolić 12; Asts: Nemanja Protić 10 |

Jane Sandanski Arena, Skopje
Attendance: 150
Referees: Luka Kardum, Tomislav Stapić, Branimir Galić

13 April 2022
18:00

Boxscore

| MZT Skopje Aerodrom (North Macedonia) | 73–68 | (Montenegro) Sutjeska |
Scoring by quarter: 22–19, 18–16, 13–15, 20–18
| Pts: Kristijan Nikolov 17; Rebs: Damjan Stojanovski 8 Asts: Kristijan Nikolov 6 | | Pts: Spasojević, Tomašević 13 each Rebs: Tomašević, Koprivica 6 each Asts: Adi Zahiragić 6 |

Jane Sandanski Arena, Skopje
Attendance: 1,500
Referees: Mario Majkić, Dragan Porobić, Miloš Hadžić

13 April 2022
21:00

Boxscore

| Široki (Bosnia and Herzegovina) | 85–81 | (Bosnia and Herzegovina) Spars Ilidža |
Scoring by quarter: 26–16, 16–15, 19–24, 24–26
| Pts: Luka Božić 31; Rebs: Mate Vucić 13; Asts: Luka Božić 5 | | Pts: Mašan Vrbica 16; Rebs: Marko Ramljak 10; Asts: Vrbica, Ramljak 6 each |

Jane Sandanski Arena, Skopje
Attendance: 100
Referees: Saša Pukl, Tomislav Vovk, Stefan Ćalić

== Semifinals ==
Semifinals were played on 15 April 2022.

15 April 2022
18:00

Boxscore

| Borac Banja Luka (Bosnia and Herzegovina) | 83–98 | (Serbia) Zlatibor |
Scoring by quarter: 23–28, 18–15, 18–24, 24–31
| Pts: Diante Baldwin 21; Rebs: Bošković, Šešlija 7 each Asts: Diante Baldwin 7 | | Pts: Dušan Kutlešić 30; Rebs: Dimitrije Nikolić 9 Asts: Dušan Kutlešić 7 |

Jane Sandanski Arena, Skopje
Attendance: 700
Referees: Miloš Koljenšić, Igor Dragojević, Marko Mustapić

15 April 2022
21:00

Boxscore

| MZT Skopje Aerodrom (North Macedonia) | 75–71 | (Bosnia and Herzegovina) Široki |
Scoring by quarter: 19–20, 25–19, 16–17, 15–15
| Pts: Damjan Stojanovski 17; Rebs: Mekić, Rikić 7 each Asts: Kristijan Nikolov 8 | | Pts: Josip Bilinovac 20; Rebs: Luka Božić 12; Asts: Bilinovac, Božić 6 each |

Jane Sandanski Arena, Skopje
Attendance: 4,500
Referees: Ilija Belošević, Ivan Stefanović, Bojan Kruljac

== Final ==
17 April 2022
19:00

Boxscore

| MZT Skopje Aerodrom (North Macedonia) | 73–78 (OT) | (Serbia) Zlatibor |
Scoring by quarter: 11–31, 25–19, 16−10, 20−12, Overtime: 1−6
| Pts: Vojdan Stojanovski 14; Rebs: Davis, Mekić 11 each Asts: Mekić, V. Stojanovski 3 each | | Pts: Dušan Kutlešić 33; Rebs: Dušan Kutlešić 10; Asts: Protić, Đuran 3 each |

Jane Sandanski Arena, Skopje
Attendance: 5,500
Referees: Tomislav Hordov, Denis Hadžić, Krunoslav Peić

| Starters: | | | Pts | Reb | Ast |
|---|---|---|---|---|---|
| PG | 5 | (North Macedonia) Kristijan Nikolov | 12 | 2 | 2 |
| SG | 20 | (North Macedonia) Vojdan Stojanovski | 14 | 8 | 3 |
| G/F | 10 | (North Macedonia) Adem Mekić | 12 | 11 | 3 |
| PF | 23 | (Montenegro) Nemanja Milošević | 10 | 7 | 1 |
| C | 33 | (Croatia) Robert Rikić | 6 | 2 | 0 |
| Reserves: | | | | | |
| F/C | 0 | (North Macedonia) Bojan Krstevski | 0 | 2 | 2 |
| F | 3 | (United States) Juan Davis | 12 | 11 | 1 |
| PG | 7 | (United States) Sharaud Curry | 0 | 0 | 0 |
| SG | 8 | (North Macedonia) Damjan Robev | 2 | 0 | 1 |
| SG | 17 | (North Macedonia) Dimitar Ivanov | DNP | | |
| G/F | 19 | (North Macedonia) Damjan Stojanovski | 5 | 6 | 2 |
| F | 77 | (North Macedonia) Bojan Veličkovski | DNP | | |
Head coach:
(Basketball Federation of North Macedonia) Aleksandar Petrović

| MZT | ZLA |

| MZT | Statistics | ZLA |
|---|---|---|
| 18/35 (51.4%) | 2-pt field goals | 21/39 (53.8%) |
| 9/33 (27.3%) | 3-pt field goals | 9/39 (23.1%) |
| 10/12 (83.3%) | Free throws | 9/18 (50%) |
| 16 | Offensive rebounds | 12 |
| 33 | Defensive rebounds | 22 |
| 49 | Total rebounds | 34 |
| 15 | Assists | 10 |
| 20 | Turnovers | 6 |
| 5 | Steals | 9 |
| 1 | Blocks | 0 |
| 22 | Fouls | 18 |

| Starters: | | | Pts | Reb | Ast |
|---|---|---|---|---|---|
| PG | 22 | (Serbia) Tadija Tadić | 7 | 3 | 1 |
| SG | 9 | (Slovenia) Sandi Grubelič | 9 | 4 | 1 |
| SG | 8 | (Serbia) Dušan Kutlešić | 33 | 10 | 2 |
| SF | 11 | (Serbia) Filip Đuran | 12 | 5 | 3 |
| C | 24 | (Serbia) Dimitrije Nikolić | 6 | 4 | 0 |
| Reserves: | | | | | |
| PG | 3 | (Serbia) Nemanja Protić | 9 | 1 | 3 |
| PF | 4 | (Serbia) Aleksa Čabrilo | 2 | 7 | 0 |
| SG | 7 | (Bosnia and Herzegovina) Stefan Adžić | DNP | | |
| C | 10 | (Serbia) Bogdan Vesović | DNP | | |
| PG | 17 | (Serbia) Vuk Jovanović | DNP | | |
| SF | 21 | (Serbia) Lazar Joksimović | 0 | 0 | 0 |
Head coach:
(Basketball Federation of Serbia) Strajin Nedović

== See also ==
- 2022 ABA League First Division Playoffs

2020–21 domestic competitions

- 2021–22 Basketball Championship of Bosnia and Herzegovina
- (Montenegro) 2021–22 Prva A liga
- (North Macedonia) 2021–22 Macedonian First League
- 2021–22 Basketball League of Serbia
- (Slovenia) 2021–22 Slovenian Basketball League
