= 2019–20 Basketball Cup of Serbia =

2019–20 Cup of Serbia
- Season: 2019–20
- Duration: 3 December 2019 – 22 January 2020
- Games played: 7
- Teams: 8

Finals
- Champions: Sloboda (1st title)
- Runners-up: Radnički Beograd
- Semifinalists: Dunav; Novi Pazar

The 2019–20 Basketball Cup of Serbia is the 14th season of the Serbian 2nd-tier men's cup tournament.

On 24 December 2019, the finalist Radnički Beograd qualified for the 2020 Radivoj Korać Cup. On the next day, Sloboda qualified for the Cup also.

== Bracket ==
Quarterfinals
9 December 2019
Pirot	80
Novi Pazar	96
4 December 2019
Radnički Beograd	93
Napredak JKP	73
3 December 2019
Joker	71
Sloboda	91
11 December 2019
Dunav	71
OKK Beograd	70

Semifinals
24 December 2019
Novi Pazar	83
Radnički Beograd	93
25 December 2019
Sloboda	88
Dunav	83

Final
22 January 2020
Radnički Beograd	105
Sloboda (OT)	109

Source: KUP KSS DRUGI STEPEN

== Quarterfinals ==
=== Pirot v Novi Pazar ===
9 December 2019
17:00

Boxscore

Pirot	80–96	Novi Pazar
Scoring by quarter: 15–26, 26–16, 23–31, 16–23
Pts: Matović 18; Rebs: Đorđević 8 Asts: Filipović, Đonlić 5		Pts: Vulić 23; Rebs: Todorović 5 Asts: Todorović 6

Kej Hall, Pirot
Attendance: 300
Referees: Petar Pešić, Dragan Matić, Strahinja Dašić

=== Radnički Beograd v Napredak JKP ===
4 December 2019
16:30

Boxscore

Radnički Beograd	93–73	Napredak JKP
Scoring by quarter: 27–23, 18–15, 30–17, 21–18
Pts: Dunđerski 20; Rebs: Dunđerski 9 Asts: Dunđerski 7		Pts: Raičević 16; Rebs: Stanković 6 Asts: Ilkić 6

Slobodan Piva Ivković Hall, Belgrade
Attendance: 100
Referees: Nemanja Ninković, Ivan Stefanović, Strahinja Dašić

=== Joker v Sloboda ===
3 December 2019
19:45

Boxscore

Joker	71–91	Sloboda
Scoring by quarter: 29–27, 21–27, 13–19, 8–18
Pts: Jovanović 24; Rebs: Suvajdžic 7 Asts: Arnaut 9		Pts: Tadić 17; Rebs: Tadić, Simović 8 Asts: Simić 5

Mostonga Hall, Sombor
Attendance: 150
Referees: Duško Sedlar, Miloš Hadžić, Bogdan Mali

=== Dunav v OKK Beograd ===
11 December 2019
19:00

Boxscore

Dunav	71–70	OKK Beograd
Scoring by quarter: 15–21, 18–19, 18–15, 20–15
Pts: Mitrović 17; Rebs: Ivić 10; Asts: Mitrović, Simić 5		Pts: Musić 19; Rebs: four players 5 Asts: Malešević 4

Park Hall, Stara Pazova
Attendance: 100
Referees: Vladimir Jevtović, Siniša Prpa, Vladimir Vesković

== Semifinals ==
=== Radnički Beograd v Novi Pazar ===
24 December 2019
16:30

Boxscore

Radnički Beograd	93–83	Novi Pazar
Scoring by quarter: 26–21, 25–21, 24–17, 18–24
Pts: Lučić 26; Rebs: Lučić 10; Asts: Dunđerski 14		Pts: Brunčević 26; Rebs: Korač 5 Asts: Korač 11

Slobodan Piva Ivković Hall, Belgrade
Attendance: 250
Referees: Radoš Arsenijević, Vladimir Jevtović, Siniša Prpa

=== Dunav v Sloboda ===
25 December 2019
19:00

Boxscore

Dunav	83–88	Sloboda
Scoring by quarter: 22–20, 25–19, 16–19, 20–30
Pts: Mitrović; Rebs: Ivić 10; Asts: Kovačević 4		Pts: Nikolić 25; Rebs: Nikolić 8 Asts: Simić 8

Park Hall, Stara Pazova
Attendance: 250
Referees: Aleksandar Glišić, Nemanja Ninković, Stefan Ćalić

== Final ==
22 January 2019
16:30

Boxscore

Radnički Beograd	105–109 (OT)	Sloboda
Scoring by quarter: 14–15, 19–28, 33–28, 26–21, Overtime: 13–17
Pts: Lučić 20; Rebs: Nikolić 10; Asts: Dunđerski 12		Pts: Nikolić 37; Rebs: Nikolić, Simović 8 Asts: Tadić 13

Slobodan Piva Ivković Hall, Belgrade
Attendance: 250
Referees: Radoš Arsenijević, Dragan Matić, Petar Pešić

== See also ==
- 2019–20 Radivoj Korać Cup
- 2019–20 Basketball League of Serbia
