= 2019–20 Radivoj Korać Cup =

2020 Triglav osiguranje^{1} Radivoj Korać Cup
Tournament details
- Country: Serbia
- City: Niš
- Venue(s): Čair Sports Center
- Dates: 13–16 February 2020
- Teams: 8
- Defending champions: Partizan NIS
- TV partner(s): Arena Sport

Final positions
- Champions: Partizan NIS
- Runners-up: Crvena zvezda mts
- Semifinalists: Mega Bemax; FMP

Tournament statistics
- Matches played: 7
- Attendance: 23,500 (3,357 per match)
- Scoring leader(s): (United States) Marcus Paige (Partizan NIS)

Awards
- MVP: (Serbia) Ognjen Jaramaz (Partizan NIS)
- ^{1} Sponsored cup name, referring to Triglav Osiguranje

The 2020 Triglav osiguranje Radivoj Korać Cup was the 18th season of the Serbian men's national basketball cup tournament. The tournament was held in Niš between 13–16 February 2020.

Partizan NIS successfully defended their title, winning third time in a row.

== Qualified teams ==
ABA League First Division	Basketball League of Serbia	Cup of Serbia (2nd-tier)
Crvena zvezda mts FMP; Mega Bemax; Partizan NIS	Borac Čačak (1st)^{1} Dynamic VIP PAY (3rd)^{1}	Radnički Beograd (runners-up); Sloboda Užice (winner)

^{1} League table position after 13 rounds played

== Venue ==
Niš	2019–20 Radivoj Korać Cup (Serbia)
Čair Sports Center	2019–20 Radivoj Korać Cup (Serbia)
Capacity: 5,000 expanded	2019–20 Radivoj Korać Cup (Serbia)

== Draw ==
The draw was held in the Crowne Plaza hotel in Belgrade on 30 January 2019.

Seeded	Unseeded
Crvena zvezda mts	Borac
FMP	Dynamic VIP PAY
Mega Bemax	Radnički Beograd
Partizan NIS	Sloboda Užice

== Bracket ==
Quarterfinals
13 February
Mega Bemax	83
Sloboda	73
13 February
Crvena zvezda mts	107
Radnički Beograd	67
14 February
Partizan NIS	87
Borac	79
14 February
FMP	98
Dynamic VIP PAY	73

Semifinals
15 February
Mega Bemax	79
Crvena zvezda mts	80
15 February
Partizan NIS	85
FMP	77

Final
16 February
Crvena zvezda mts	84
Partizan NIS (OT)	85

== Quarterfinals ==
All times are local UTC+1.

=== Crvena zvezda mts v Radnički Beograd ===
Arena Sport

13 February 2020
17:00

Boxscore

Crvena zvezda mts	107–67	Radnički Beograd
Scoring by quarter: 25–28, 35–14, 24–13, 23–12
Pts: Punter 23; Rebs: Gist 8 Asts: three players 4		Pts: Valjarević 16; Rebs: Dunđerski 4 Asts: Dunđerski 11

Čair Sports Center, Niš
Attendance: 4,500
Referees: Siniša Prpa, Nemanja Ninković, Stefan Ćalić

=== Mega Bemax v Sloboda ===
Arena Sport

13 February 2020
19:30

Boxscore

Mega Bemax	82–73	Sloboda
Scoring by quarter: 24–22, 15–25, 25–16, 18–10
Pts: Simonović 32; Rebs: Simonović 13; Asts: Perry 6		Pts: Simić 18; Rebs: Simović 13; Asts: Foster 5

Čair Sports Center, Niš
Attendance: 500
Referees: Aleksandar Glišić, Radoš Arsenijević, Nemanja Vlahović

=== FMP v Dynamic VIP PAY ===
Arena Sport

14 February 2020
17:00

Boxscore

FMP	98–73	Dynamic VIP PAY
Scoring by quarter: 23–21, 25–17, 26–14, 24–21
Pts: Pot 14; Rebs: Pecarski 7 Asts: Uskoković 4		Pts: Glišić 17; Rebs: Beslać 5 Asts: Akay 11

Čair Sports Center, Niš
Attendance: 1,000
Referees: Vladimir Jevtović, Ivan Stefanović, Petar Pešić

=== Partizan NIS v Borac ===
Arena Sport

14 February 2020
19:30

Boxscore

Partizan NIS	87–79	Borac
Scoring by quarter: 20–18, 26–15, 13–22, 28–24
Pts: Zagorac 16; Rebs: McAdoo 9 Asts: Jaramaz 5		Pts: Đoković, Jones 18; Rebs: Nerandžić, Čarapić 5 Asts: Popović 5

Čair Sports Center, Niš
Attendance: 4,000
Referees: Saša Maričić, Branislav Mrdak, Vladimir Vesković

== Semifinals ==
All times are local UTC+1.

=== Mega Bemax v Crvena zvezda mts ===
Arena Sport

15 February 2020
17:00

Boxscore

Mega Bemax	79–80	Crvena zvezda mts
Scoring by quarter: 24–17, 9–23, 27–18, 19–22
Pts: Perry 20; Rebs: Simonović 11; Asts: Perry 9		Pts: Punter 22; Rebs: Gist, Štimac 7 Asts: Brown 3

Čair Sports Center, Niš
Attendance: 4,000
Referees: Milivoje Jovčić, Saša Maričić, Vladimir Jevtović

=== Partizan NIS v FMP ===
Arena Sport

15 February 2020
21:00

Boxscore

Partizan NIS	85–77	FMP
Scoring by quarter: 24–22, 16–23, 23–12, 22–20
Pts: Thomas 13; Rebs: three players 6 Asts: Walden 5		Pts: Kuzmić 13; Rebs: three players 6 Asts: Čović 8

Čair Sports Center, Niš
Attendance: 4,500
Referees: Ilija Belošević, Uroš Obrknežević, Uroš Nikolić

== Final ==
This is the fourth final game in a row between Crvena zvezda and Partizan, and the seventh final in the Radivoj Korać Cup overall.

Arena Sport

16 February 2020
21:00

Boxscore

Crvena zvezda mts	84–85 (OT)	Partizan NIS
Scoring by quarter: 13–19, 18–15, 18–18, 29–26, Overtime: 6–7
Pts: Brown 17; Rebs: Štimac 10; Asts: Brown 7		Pts: Paige 21; Rebs: Zagorac 6 Asts: Walden 5

Čair Sports Center, Niš
Attendance: 5,000
Referees: Ilija Belošević, Milivoje Jovčić, Uroš Nikolić

Starters:			Pts	Reb	Ast
G	22	(Serbia) Charles Jenkins	5	3	2
G	12	(United States) Billy Baron	8	5	2
SF	10	(Serbia) Branko Lazić	0	1	1
PF	21	(Serbia) Marko Jagodić-Kuridža	4	2	0
C	91	(Serbia) Vladimir Štimac	11	10	0
Reserves:					
G	00	(United States) Kevin Punter	12	3	1
PG	4	(United States) Lorenzo Brown	17	2	7
G/F	7	(Serbia) Dejan Davidovac	16	3	1
SF	13	(Serbia) Ognjen Dobrić	DNP		
F/C	15	(United States) James Gist	11	5	0
PF	28	(Serbia) Boriša Simanić	DNP		
C	50	(Nigeria) Michael Ojo	0	3	0
Head coach:
(Serbia) Dragan Šakota

CZV	PAR

CZV	Statistics	PAR
20/46 (43%)	2-pt field goals	16/36 (44%)
7/18 (38%)	3-pt field goals	12/30 (40%)
23/25 (92%)	Free throws	17/28 (60%)
12	Offensive rebounds	10
32	Defensive rebounds	25
44	Total rebounds	35
14	Assists	14
22	Turnovers	13
5	Steals	8
3	Blocks	5
33 (29)	Fouls	31 (32)

2019–20 Radivoj Korać Cup Champions
Partizan NIS
16th title
MVP
(Serbia) Ognjen Jaramaz

Starters:			Pts	Reb	Ast
G	2	(United States) Corey Walden	9	2	5
G	10	(Serbia) Ognjen Jaramaz	19	3	2
SF	3	(Serbia) Rade Zagorac	11	6	2
PF	12	(Serbia) Novica Veličković	9	4	2
F/C	21	(Serbia) Nikola Janković	6	3	2
Reserves:					
G	5	(United States) Marcus Paige	21	1	1
PF	8	(United States) James McAdoo	0	1	0
G	9	(Serbia) Lazar Stefanović	DNP		
PF	14	(Serbia) Stefan Birčević	4	1	0
PF	25	(United States) Rashawn Thomas	2	3	0
G	32	(Serbia) Uroš Trifunović	2	1	0
C	42	(United States) William Mosley	2	5	0
Head coach:
(Italy) Andrea Trinchieri

== See also ==
- 2019 ABA League Supercup
- 2019–20 Milan Ciga Vasojević Cup
