= Dimitrije Nikolić =

Serbian basketball player

MZT Skopje
- Position: Center
- League: Macedonian League

Personal information
- Born: 6 August 1997 (age 29) Kragujevac, Serbia, FR Yugoslavia
- Listed height: 2.11 m (6 ft 11 in)
- Listed weight: 114 kg (251 lb)

Career information
- Playing career: 2016–present

Career history
- 2016–2017: Kregujevački Radnički
- 2017: Mladost Zemun
- 2017–2021: Partizan
- 2017: → Sloga
- 2018–2019: → Mladost Zemun
- 2019–2021: → Sloboda Užice
- 2021: FMP
- 2021–2022: Zlatibor
- 2022–2023: SCM U Craiova
- 2023–2024: Zlatibor
- 2024: Nevėžis Kėdainiai
- 2024–2025: SPD Radnički
- 2025: SCM U Craiova
- 2025–2026: Corona Brașov
- 2026–present: MZT Skopje

Career highlights
- ABA League 2 champion (2022); Serbian League Cup winner (2020)

Dimitrije Nikolić (Serbian Cyrillic: Димитрије Николић, born 6 August 1997) is a Serbian professional basketball player for MZT Skopje of the Macedonian League.

== Professional career ==
Nikolić started his career with Radnički in the Basketball League of Serbia. He also played for the Mladost Zemun, also in the Serbian League.

On 26 September 2017, Nikolić signed a multi-year contract with Partizan Belgrade.

On 21 May 2021, Nikolić signed a three-year contract for FMP. On 18 November 2021, he parted ways with FMP.

In April 2022, Zlatibor won the ABA League Second Division for the 2021–22 season following a 78–73 overtime win over MZT Skopje Aerodreom.

On 18 July 2024, Nikolič signed with Nevėžis Kėdainiai of the Lithuanian Basketball League (LKL).
