= Dušan Kutlešić =

Serbian basketball player

Free Agent
- Position: Shooting guard

Personal information
- Born: October 30, 1994 (age 32) Užice, FR Yugoslavia
- Listed height: 1.99 m (6 ft 6 in)
- Listed weight: 91 kg (201 lb)

Career information
- NBA draft: 2016: undrafted
- Playing career: 2012–present

Career history
- 2012–2014: Sloboda
- 2014–2016: Metalac Farmakom
- 2016–2017: FMP
- 2017–2018: Vršac
- 2018: Borac Čačak
- 2018–2019: Dynamic Belgrade
- 2019–2020: Sloboda
- 2020: Steaua București
- 2020–2022: Zlatibor
- 2022–2023: Zastal Zielona Góra

Career highlights
- ABA League 2 champion (2022); Serbian League Cup winner (2020)
Medals
Men's basketball
Representing Serbia
U19 World Championship
Silver medal – second place	2013 Czech Republic	U-19 Team
U18 European Championship
Bronze medal – third place	2012 Lithuania/Latvia	U-18 Team

Dušan Kutlešić (Serbian Cyrillic: Душан Кутлешић, born 30 October 1994) is a Serbian professional basketball player who last played for Zastal Zielona Góra of the Polish Basketball League.

== Professional career ==
Kutlešić signed with Dynamic on August 29, 2018.

In April 2022, Zlatibor won the ABA League Second Division for the 2021–22 season following a 78–73 overtime win over MZT Skopje Aerodreom. He was named the Playoffs MVP.

On July 8, 2022, he has signed with Stelmet Zielona Góra of the Polish Basketball League (PLK).
