= Miloš Obrenović (basketball) =

Serbian basketball coach

Karşıyaka Basket
- Position: Assistant coach
- League: Basketbol Süper Ligi

Personal information
- Born: 12 May 1988 (age 38) Titovo Užice, Serbia, Yugoslavia
- Coaching career: 2011–present

Career history

Coaching
- 2011–2012: Sloboda Užice
- 2012–2014: Varda HE
- 2016–2018: Banvit (assistant)
- 2019–2022: Crvena zvezda Youth
- 2025–present: Karşıyaka Basket (assistant)
Medals
Men's basketball
Assistant coach for Serbia
U18 European Championship
Silver medal – second place	2011 Poland	U18 Team
FIBA Europe Under-16 Championship
Bronze medal – third place	2012 Lithuania/Latvia	U16 Team

Miloš Obrenović (Serbian Cyrillic: Милош Обреновић; born 12 May 1988) is a Serbian professional basketball coach.

== Coaching career ==
Obrenović coached Sloboda Užice and the Bosnian team Varda HE. Obrenović was an assistant coach for the Turkish club Banvit until 2018.

In September 2019, Obrenović was hired as the head coach for the Crvena zvezda Cadets (under-16 team), succeeding Slobodan Klipa who took the Zvezda's Juniors.

On August 26, 2025, he signed with Karşıyaka Basket of the Basketbol Süper Ligi (BSL).

== National teams coaching career ==
Obrenović was an assistant coach of the U18 Serbia national team that won the silver medal at the 2011 FIBA Europe Under-18 Championship in Poland. Obrenović was an assistant coach of the U16 Serbia national team that won the bronze medal at the 2012 FIBA Europe Under-16 Championship in Latvia and Lithuania. At both championships (2011 and 2012), he was an assistant coach to the head coach Marko Ičelić. Also, Obrenović was an assistant coach at the 2015 FIBA Europe Under-16 Championship in Kaunas, Lithuania.
