= Tadija Tadić =

Serbian basketball player

MZT Skopje
- Position: Point guard
- League: Macedonian League• FIBA Europe Cup • ABA 2

Personal information
- Born: April 22, 1999 (age 27) Belgrade, FR Yugoslavia
- Listed height: 1.94 m (6 ft 4 in)
- Listed weight: 87 kg (192 lb)

Career information
- Playing career: 2017–present

Career history
- 2017–2021: Partizan
- 2018–2019: → Mladost Zemun
- 2019–2021: → Sloboda Užice
- 2021–2023: Zlatibor
- 2023–2024: DEAC
- 2024–2025: Kumanovo
- 2025–2026: Sutjeska
- 2026–present: MZT Skopje

Career highlights
- ABA League 2 champion (2022); Serbian Cup winner (2018); Serbian League Cup winner (2020)
Medals
Men's basketball
Representing Serbia
FIBA Europe Under-18 Championship
Gold medal – first place	2017 Slovakia	U18 Team

Tadija Tadić (Serbian Cyrillic: Тадија Тадић, born April 22, 1999) is a Serbian professional basketball player who plays for MZT Skopje the Macedonian League.

== Professional career ==
On September 8, 2017, Tadić signed a four-year contract with the Partizan NIS from Belgrade.

In April 2022, Zlatibor won the ABA League Second Division for the 2021–22 season following a 78–73 overtime win over MZT Skopje Aerodrom.

== National team career ==
Tadić was a member of the Serbian U-18 national basketball team that won the gold medal at the 2017 FIBA Europe Under-18 Championship. Over seven tournament games, he averaged 3.1 points, 2.4 rebounds and 1.3 assists per game. He also represented Serbia men's national under-16 team at the 2015 Championship. Over eight games he averaged 4.6 points, 2.0 rebounds and 1.9 assists per game. Tadić was a member of the Serbian under-20 team that finished 15th at the 2019 FIBA U20 European Championship in Tel Aviv, Israel. Over three tournament games, he averaged 0.7 rebounds and 1 assist per game.
