= List of current ABA Liga team rosters =

Below is a list of current rosters of teams from ABA League First Division and Second Division:

== See also ==
- List of current Basketball League of Serbia team rosters
