= OKK Dunav =

Basketball club in Stari Banovci, Serbia

Dunav
- Nickname: Alasi (Danube Fishermen)
- Leagues: Basketball League of Serbia
- Founded: October 1976; 49 years ago
- History: KK Dunav (1976–2017); OKK Dunav (2017–present)
- Arena: Park Hall
- Location: Stara Pazova, Serbia
- Team colors: White and Light Blue
- President: Zoran Kristić
- Head coach: Mitar Ašćerić
- Affiliation: Partizan (2021–present)
- Website: www.kkdunav.rs
Home	Away

Omladinski košarkaški klub Dunav (Serbian Cyrillic: Омладински кошаркашки клуб Дунав), commonly referred to as OKK Dunav, is a men's professional basketball club based in Stari Banovci, near Stara Pazova, Serbia. They are currently competing in the Basketball League of Serbia (KLS). The club is the league affiliate of Partizan NIS.

Nicknamed Alasi (transl. Danube Fishermen), the club was named after Danube (Serbian: Дунав, romanized: Dunav), a river which passes near Stari Banovci.

== History ==
The club was founded in 1976 as KK Dunav. In early 2017, Dunav got qualified for the 2017 Radivoj Korać Cup. In the Cup tournament they lost to Partizan in the quarterfinals. In March 2017, the club changed its name to OKK Dunav.

In August 2021, the club signed a contract on sports and technical cooperation with Adriatic League team Partizan. In November 2022, the club applied and declined subsequently participation in the 2022–23 season of the European North Basketball League (ENBL).

== Players ==
=== Current roster ===
Note: Flags indicate national team eligibility at FIBA-sanctioned events. Players may hold other non-FIBA nationalities not displayed.

Dunav roster
Players
Coaches

Pos.	No.	Nat.	Name	Ht.	Age
G/F	1	(Serbia)	Dobrašinović, Vuk	1.98 m (6 ft 6 in)	23 – 9 June 2002
PG	5	(Serbia)	Popović, Srđan	1.86 m (6 ft 1 in)	22 – 27 March 2003
PF	6	(Croatia)	Cvitković, Tomislav	2.06 m (6 ft 9 in)	27 – 19 May 1998
PG	9	(Serbia)	Malidžan, Vuk	1.88 m (6 ft 2 in)	37 – 14 January 1988
PG	10	(Serbia)	Milenković, Miloš	1.88 m (6 ft 2 in)	23 – 15 November 2001
SG	13	(Montenegro)	Jovanović, Đorđije (L)	1.97 m (6 ft 6 in)	22 – 15 May 2003
G	19	(Serbia)	Miljković, Aleksandar (C)	1.93 m (6 ft 4 in)	31 – 18 March 1994
PF	21	(Montenegro)	Grković, Marko	2.00 m (6 ft 7 in)	28 – 21 January 1997
PF	33	(Serbia)	Vukčević, Marko (L)	2.05 m (6 ft 9 in)	22 – 6 May 2003
F/C		(Serbia)	Krsmanović, Srđan	2.06 m (6 ft 9 in)	24 – 2 December 2000
PG		(Turkey)	Oktay, Alp	1.89 m (6 ft 2 in)	24 – 9 February 2001

Head coach

- (Serbia) Mitar Ašćerić

Assistant coach(es)

- (Serbia) Slobodan Adamović
- (Serbia) Aleksandar Vržina

Legend

- (C) Team captain
- (TW) Two-way affiliate player
- Injured

- Roster
Updated: June 16, 2022

== Coaches ==
- (Serbia) Vuk Stanimirović (2010–2017)
- (Serbia) Mitar Ašćerić (2017–2021)
- (Serbia) Milivoje Lazić (2021–2022)
- (Serbia) Mitar Ašćerić (2022–present)

== Trophies and awards ==
=== Trophies ===
- First Regional League, North Division (3rd-tier)
  - Winners (1): 2014–15

== Season-by-season ==
Season	Tier	Division	Pos.	Postseason	W–L	National Cup	Regional competition	European competitions
2006–07				—		—	—	—
2007–08				—		—	—	—
2008–09	3	First Regional League	9	None		—	—	—
2009–10	3	First Regional League	4	None		—	—	—
2010–11	3	First Regional League	3	None	20–6	—	—	—
2011–12	3	First Regional League	11	None	10–16	—	—	—
2012–13	3	First Regional League	5	None	15–11	—	—	—
2013–14	3	First Regional League	2	None	22–4	—	—	—
2014–15	3	First Regional League	1	None	24–0	—	—	—
2015–16	2	Second League	2	None	21–5	—	—	—
2016–17	1	BLS First League	5	—	14–12	Quarterfinalist	—	—
2017–18	1	BLS First League	9	–	12–14	—	—	—
2018–19	1	BLS First League	8	SL A–6	12–24	—	—	—
2019–20	1	BLS First League	10	—	10–16	—	—	—
2020–21	1	BLS First League	14	—	11–19	—	—	—
2021–22	1	BLS First League	12	—	14–16	—	—	—

== See also ==
- FK Dunav Stari Banovci
