= Stefan Simić (basketball) =

Serbian basketball player

Kozuv
- Position: Guard
- League: Macedonian First League

Personal information
- Born: January 3, 1996 (age 30) Šabac, Serbia, FR Yugoslavia
- Listed height: 1.93 m (6 ft 4 in)
- Listed weight: 81 kg (179 lb)

Career information
- Playing career: 2013–present

Career history
- 2013–2017: Mega Basket
- 2013–2014: → Smederevo 1953
- 2014–2015: → Napredak Kruševac
- 2016–2017: → Smederevo 1953
- 2017–2021: Sloboda Užice
- 2021–2022: Mladost Zemun
- 2022: Sutjeska
- 2022–2024: Vršac
- 2024–2025: Joker
- 2025–2026: Sloboda Užice
- 2026–present: Kožuv

Career highlights
- Serbian League Cup winner (2020)
Medals
Men's basketball
Representing Serbia
U18 European Championship
Silver medal – second place	2014 Turkey	Team

Stefan Simić (Serbian Cyrillic: Стефан Симић, born 3 January 1996) is a Serbian professional basketball player for Kožuv of the Macedonian First League.
