= Uroš Lučić =

Serbian basketball player

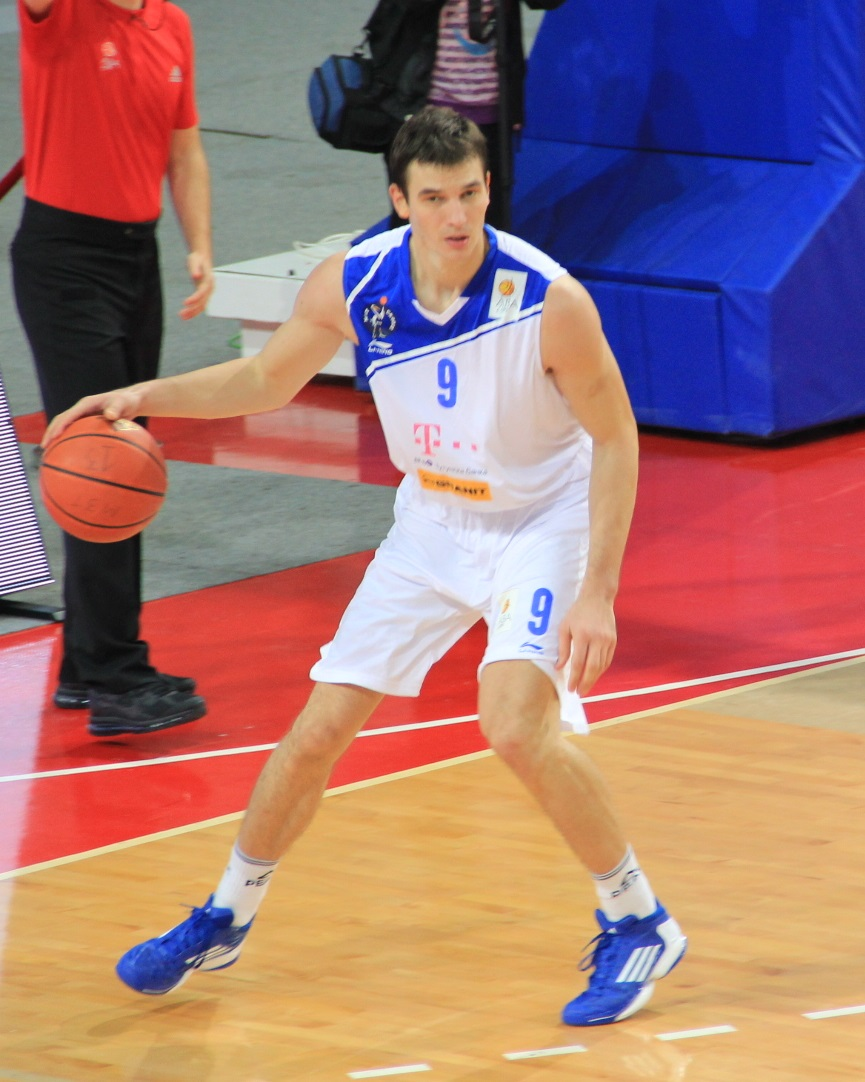
- Lučić with MZT in 2013

Personal information
- Born: March 12, 1983 (age 43) Belgrade, SFR Yugoslavia
- Listed height: 2.07 m (6 ft 9 in)

Career information
- Playing career: 2001–2021
- Position: Power forward

Career history
- 2001–2003: Radnički Beograd
- 2003–2004: KK Svilajnac
- 2004–2006: Sloga
- 2006: Radnički Zastava
- 2006–2007: Ergonom
- 2007–2008: Zdravlje
- 2008: Vizura
- 2008–2009: Zlatorog Laško
- 2009–2010: Krka
- 2010–2011: Steaua București
- 2011: OKK Beograd
- 2011: Radnički Kragujevac
- 2011–2013: Krka
- 2013–2015: MZT Skopje
- 2015–2016: CSM Oradea
- 2016: MZT Skopje
- 2016–2017: CSM Oradea
- 2017–2019: Jászberényi KSE
- 2019–2021: Radnički Beograd

Career highlights
- Romanian League champion (2016); 3× Slovenian League champion (2010, 2012, 2013); 2× Macedonian League champion (2014, 2015)

Uroš Lučić (born March 12, 1983) is a Serbian professional basketball player who last played for Radnički Beograd of the Second Basketball League of Serbia.

He is the older brother of Vladimir Lučić, who is currently playing for Bayern Munich.

== Professional career ==
During his career, Lučić played for numerous clubs in several countries, most notably with Zlatorog Laško and Krka in Slovenia. In his homeland, Lučić played with OKK Beograd and Radnički Kragujevac.
