= Kristijan Nikolov =

Macedonian-Turkish basketball player

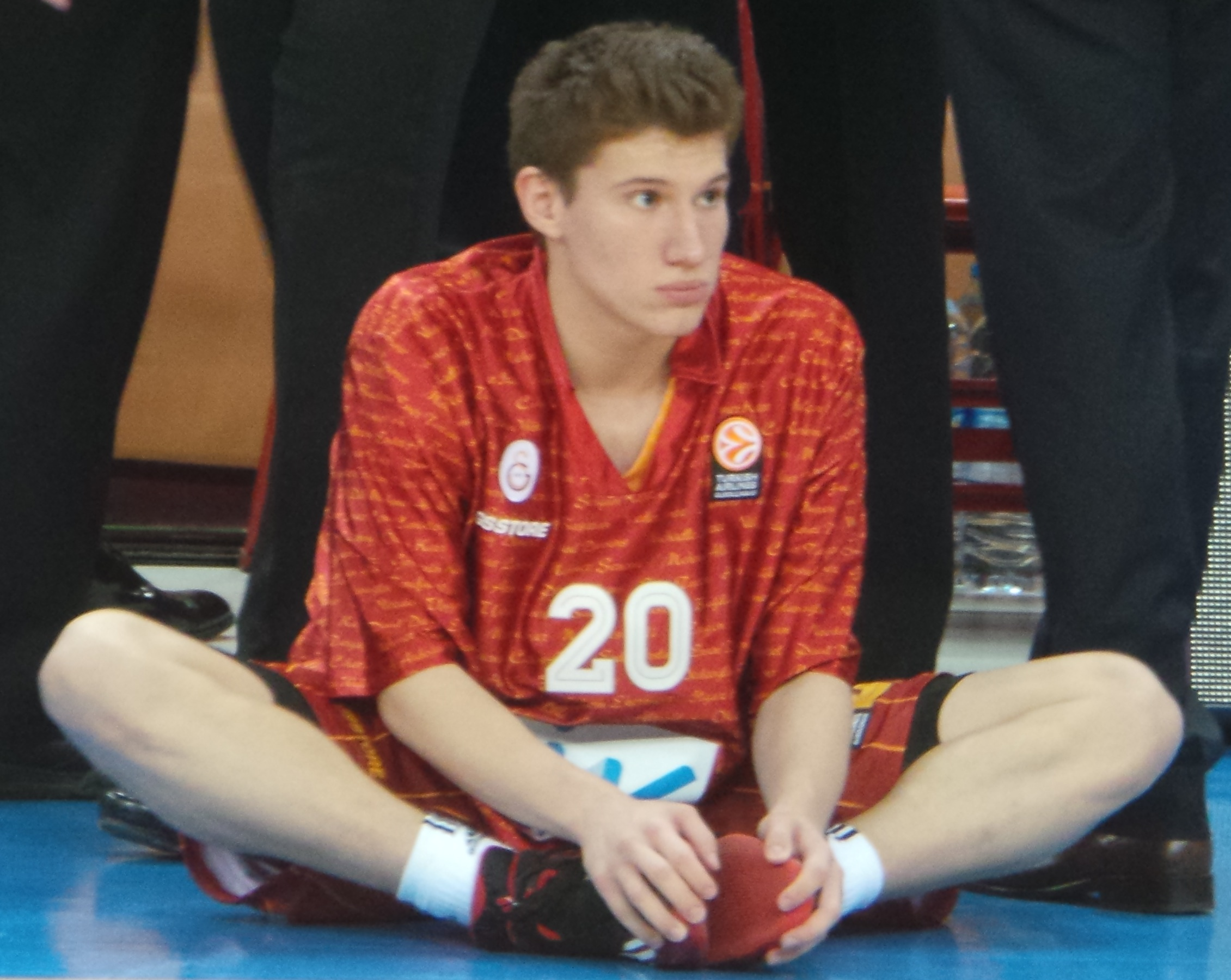
- Nikolov with Galatasaray in November 2014.

Rabotnički
- Position: Point guard
- League: Macedonian League

Personal information
- Born: 5 October 1996 (age 30) Skopje, Macedonia
- Listed height: 1.87 m (6 ft 2 in)
- Listed weight: 83 kg (183 lb)

Career information
- Playing career: 2014–present

Career history
- 2014–2016: Galatasaray
- 2015–2016: →Yeşilgiresun Belediye
- 2016: Trabzonspor
- 2016–2017: İstanbul BB
- 2017–2018: Yeşilgiresun Belediye
- 2018–2019: Socar Petkim S.K.
- 2019–2022: MZT Skopje
- 2022–2023: Konyaspor
- 2023: Rabotnički
- 2024: Kapakli Spor
- 2024–2025: Cedi Osman BSK
- 2025–2026: Gaziantep Basketbol
- 2026–present: Rabotnički

Career highlights
- Macedonian Cup winner (2021); 2× Macedonian League champion (2021,2022)

Kristijan Nikolov (born 5 October 1996) is a Macedonian-Turkish professional basketball player for Rabotnički of the [[[Macedonian First League (basketball)|Macedonian League]].

== Early years ==
Nikolov was born in Skopje, North Macedonia (then the Republic of Macedonia), to Macedonian parents. He started playing basketball in Macedonia. In 2010, he moved to Galatasaray Liv Hospital, where he signed a youth contract to play in it the club's youngster teams.

== Professional career ==
Nikolov made his debut in Galatasaray's senior team in the 2014–15 season.

On 28 June 2015, he was sent on loan to Yeşilgiresun Belediye.

On 2 December 2016, he signed with İstanbul BB.

On 12 September 2017, Nikolov returned to Yeşilgiresun Belediye.

On 12 January 2018, he signed with Socar Petkim S.K.

On 24 July 2019, he signed with MZT Skopje.

On July 12, 2022, he has signed with Konyaspor of the Turkish Basketbol Süper Ligi (BSL).

== Personal ==
In 2014, Nikolov became a Turkish citizen at the age of 17.
