= Nikola Marković =

Nikola Marković may refer to:

- Nikola Marković (basketball) (born 1989), Serbian basketball player
- Nikola Markovic (soccer) (born 2004), Canadian soccer player
- Nikola Marković (painter) (1843–1889, Serbian painter
