= Nikola Korač =

Montenegrin basketball player

Nikola Korać
Personal information
- Born: January 15, 1986 (age 40) Bijelo Polje, SR Montenegro, SFR Yugoslavia
- Listed height: 6 ft 1 in (1.85 m)
- Listed weight: 198 lb (90 kg)

Career information
- NBA draft: 2008: undrafted
- Playing career: 2003–present
- Position: Point guard

Career history
- 2003–2004: Prokuplje
- 2005–2006: OKK Beograd
- 2006–2007: Prokuplje
- 2007–2010: OKK Beograd
- 2010: Igokea
- 2010–2011: Jedinstvo Bijelo Polje
- 2012: White Eagles Stockholm
- 2012–2013: Jedinstvo Bijelo Polje
- 2013–2014: Teodo
- 2014: Kožuv
- 2014–2015: Mornar
- 2015–2016: Sutjeska
- 2016: Mornar
- 2017–2018: Lovćen 1947
- 2018–2019: Bosco
- 2019: Šibenik
- 2019–2020: Novi Pazar
- 2020–2021: Sutjeska
- 2021–2022: Podgorica

Nikola Korać (born January 15, 1986) is a Montenegrin professional basketball player who last played for Podgorica of the Montenegrin Basketball League.
