= Mitar Ašćerić =

Serbian basketball player and coach

Dunav
- Position: Head coach
- League: Basketball League of Serbia

Personal information
- Born: 8 November 1973 (age 53) Zemun, SR Serbia, SFR Yugoslavia

Career information
- NBA draft: 1995: undrafted
- Playing career: 1991–2006
- Coaching career: 2013–present

Career history

Coaching
- 2013–2017: Dunav (assistant)
- 2017–2021, 2022–present: Dunav

Mitar Ašćerić (Serbian Cyrillic: Митар Ашћерић; born 8 November 1973) is a Serbian professional basketball coach and former player who is the head coach for Dunav of the Basketball League of Serbia.

== Playing career ==
Ašćerić retired as a player with Dunav in 2006.

== Coaching career ==
In 2017, Ašćerić was hired as the head coach for Dunav. He previously worked there as an assistant coach. In September 2021 he left his job as head coach.

== Personal life ==
Ašćerić used to be a member of the Stara Pazova City Assembly.
