= Vuk Malidžan =

Serbian basketball player

No. 9 – Dunav
- Position: Point guard
- League: Basketball League of Serbia

Personal information
- Born: January 14, 1988 (age 38) Belgrade, SR Serbia, SFR Yugoslavia
- Listed height: 1.88 m (6 ft 2 in)
- Listed weight: 78 kg (172 lb)

Career information
- NBA draft: 2010: undrafted
- Playing career: 2008–present

Career history
- 2008–2010: Superfund BP
- 2010–2011: Varda HE
- 2011–2015: OKK Beograd
- 2015–2016: Helios Domžale
- 2016: Nokia
- 2016–2017: Dunav
- 2017–2018: Mladost Zemun
- 2018: Nokia
- 2018–2019: Dynamic Belgrade
- 2019: Handlová
- 2019–2023: Dunav

Career highlights
- Second League of Serbia champion (2010); Serbian First League MVP (2015)

Vuk Malidžan (Serbian Cyrillic: Вук Малиџан, born January 14, 1988) is a Serbian professional basketball player for Dunav of the Basketball League of Serbia.

== Professional career ==
Malidžan played for the Superfund BP (Second League of Serbia), and for OKK Beograd and Dunav Stari Banovci of the Basketball League of Serbia. He was selected as the First League MVP in 2014–15 season. Prior to the 2017–18 season, he signed for Mladost Zemun. Malidžan also played abroad for the Varda HE (Bosnia and Herzegovina), Helios Domžale (Slovenia) and Nokia (Finland).
