= Nemanja Protić =

Serbian basketball player

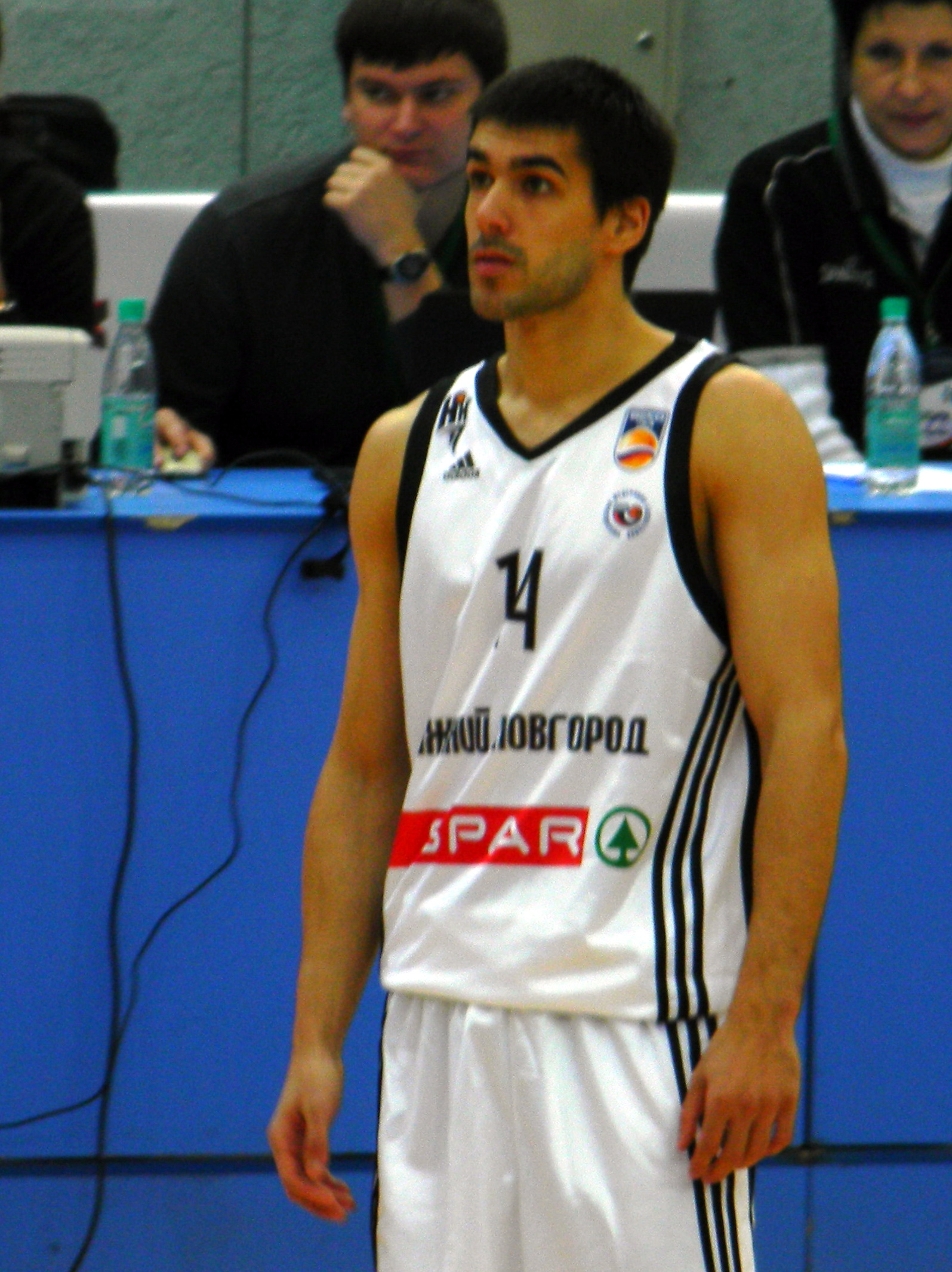
- Protić in 2011

Personal information
- Born: August 13, 1986 (age 40) Čačak, SR Serbia, SFR Yugoslavia
- Listed height: 1.82 m (6 ft 0 in)
- Listed weight: 78 kg (172 lb)

Career information
- NBA draft: 2008: undrafted
- Playing career: 2005–present
- Position: Point guard

Career history
- 2005–2006: Borac Čačak
- 2006–2010: FMP Železnik
- 2010–2011: EWE Baskets Oldenburg
- 2011: Khimik
- 2011–2012: Nizhny Novgorod
- 2012: Olin Edirne
- 2013: Borac Čačak
- 2013: Levski Sofia
- 2013: Borac Čačak
- 2013–2014: Budućnost Podgorica
- 2014: Borac Čačak
- 2015: Metalac Valjevo
- 2015–2016: MZT Skopje
- 2016–2017: Jászberényi KSE
- 2017–2018: Universitet Yugra Surgut
- 2018–2019: Spars Sarajevo
- 2019–2020: Petrochimi Bandar Imam
- 2020–2023: Zlatibor
- 2023–2024: BKK Radnički
- 2024–present: Dynamic

Career highlights
- ABA League 2 champion (2022); Macedonian League champion (2016); Serbian Cup winner (2007); Macedonian Cup winner (2016)
Medals
Men's basketball
Representing Serbia
Universiade
Gold medal – first place	2009 Belgrade	Team competition

Nemanja Protić (Serbian Cyrillic: Немања Протић; born August 13, 1986) is a Serbian professional basketball player. He is a 1.82 m (6 ft 0 in) tall point guard.

== Playing career ==
In April 2022, Zlatibor won the ABA League Second Division for the 2021–22 season following a 78–73 overtime win over MZT Skopje Aerodreom.
