= Ranko Simović =

Serbian basketball player

No. 11 – FMP
- Position: Small forward
- League: Basketball League of Serbia; ABA League

Personal information
- Born: June 7, 1999 (age 27) Podgorica, Montenegro, FR Yugoslavia
- Listed height: 2.03 m (6 ft 8 in)
- Listed weight: 90 kg (198 lb)

Career information
- NBA draft: 2021: undrafted
- Playing career: 2018–present

Career history
- 2018–2022: Crvena zvezda
- 2018–2019: → Vršac
- 2019: → FMP
- 2019–2020: → Sloboda Užice
- 2020–2022: → FMP
- 2022–present: FMP

Career highlights
- Serbian League Cup winner (2020)

Ranko Simović (Serbian Cyrillic: Ранко Симовић, born June 7, 1999) is a Serbian professional basketball player who currently plays for FMP of the ABA League as a loaned player of Crvena zvezda mts.

== Professional career ==
Simović grew up playing basketball for Mladost Čačak. In 2016, he was added to the Crvena zvezda U18 team.

On June 19, 2017, Simović signed a four-year contract with Crvena zvezda. Prior to the 2018–19 season he was loaned out to Vršac. Through 21 games in the 2018–19 ABA 2 season, he averaged 5.5 points, 3.6 rebounds, and 0.9 assists per game. In April 2019, he joined FMP for the rest of the 2018–19 season. In December, he was loaned to Sloboda Užice for the rest of the 2019–20 season.

In May 2022, Simović signed a two-year contract with FMP.

== National team career ==
Simović was a member of the Serbia under-18 team that finished 10th at the 2016 FIBA Europe Under-18 Championship in Samsun, Turkey. Over seven tournament games, he averaged 3.8 points, 4.2 rebounds, and 0.6 assists per game. Simović was a member of the Serbian under-20 team that finished 15th at the 2019 FIBA U20 European Championship in Tel Aviv, Israel. Over seven tournament games, he averaged 9.9 points, 7.1 rebounds, and 1.7 assists per game.
