= Strajin Nedović =

Serbian basketball coach and former player

Zlatibor
- Position: Head coach
- League: ABA League Second Division; Basketball League of Serbia

Personal information
- Born: 7 August 1976 (age 50) Titovo Užice, Serbia, Yugoslavia

Career information
- NBA draft: 1998: undrafted
- Playing career: 1994–2011
- Coaching career: 2004–present

Career history

Playing
- 1994–1995: Zlatibor
- 1995–1996: Radnički Obrenovac
- 1996–2011: Zlatibor

Coaching
- 2004–2014: Zlatibor (youth)
- 2014–2019: Zlatibor (assistant)
- 2019–present: Zlatibor

Career highlights
- ABA League 2 champion (2022)

Strajin Nedović (Serbian Cyrillic: Страјин Недовић; born 7 August 1976) is a Serbian professional basketball coach and former player who is the head coach for Zlatibor of the Basketball League of Serbia and the ABA League Second Division.

== Playing career ==
As a basketball player, Nedović almost played his entire career with Zlatibor. The only period out of Zlatibor was in the 1995–96 season when he played for Radnički Obrenovac. Nedović retired as a player with Zlatibor in 2011.

== Coaching career ==
Nedović joined the coaching staff of Zlatibor when he was an active player for the club. At first, he was a coach in their youth system. Later, he became an assistant coach. As the assistant coach, Nedović participated in the greatest successes of the club, such as the promotion to the Second League of Serbia in 2015, as well as the promotion to the Basketball League of Serbia (BLS) two years later. In BLS, he was an assistant to Vanja Guša for two seasons, starting in 2017.

In February 2019, Nedović became the head coach for Zlatibor after Guša parted ways with the club. In April 2022, Zlatibor won the ABA League Second Division for the 2021–22 season following a 78–73 overtime win over MZT Skopje Aerodreom.

== Personal life ==
Nedović was a party leader of the Democratic Party (DS) in Čajetina. He was a candidate at the 2008 Serbian local elections in Čajetina. In February 2014, he left the Democratic Party to join newly formed New Democratic Party (NDS) (later Social Democratic Party) led by former Serbian President Boris Tadić.
