= Slobodan Dunđerski =

Serbian basketball player

Free agent
- Position: Point guard

Personal information
- Born: March 1, 1988 (age 38) Belgrade, SFR Yugoslavia
- Listed height: 1.90 m (6 ft 3 in)
- Listed weight: 74 kg (163 lb)

Career information
- NBA draft: 2010: undrafted
- Playing career: 2007–present

Career history
- 2007–2008: Sūduva
- 2008–2009: Vizura
- 2009–2011: OKK Beograd
- 2011–2012: Vojvodina Srbijagas
- 2012–2013: Gaz Metan Mediaş
- 2013–2014: FMP
- 2014–2015: Metalac Valjevo
- 2015: Kožuv
- 2015: Mladost Zemun
- 2015–2016: BC Timișoara
- 2016: Jászberényi KSE
- 2016–2017: Dinamo București
- 2019–2021: Radnički Beograd

Slobodan Dunđerski (born March 1, 1988) is a Serbian professional basketball player.
