= 2021–22 ABA League Second Division =

ABA League Second Division
- Season: 2021–22
- Duration: 11 October 2021 – 17 April 2022
- Games played: 13 each
- Teams: 14
- TV partner: Arena Sport

Regular season
- Top seed: (North Macedonia) MZT Skopje Aerodrom

Finals
- Champions: (Serbia) Zlatibor (1st title)
- Runners-up: (North Macedonia) MZT Skopje Aerodrom
- Semifinalists: (Bosnia and Herzegovina) Borac Banja Luka (Bosnia and Herzegovina) Široki
- Finals MVP: (Serbia) Dušan Kutlešić

Statistical leaders
Points	(United States) Antoine Livingston	22.77
Rebounds	(Serbia) Nikola Janković	9.5
Assists	(North Macedonia) Boban Stajić	6.92
Index Rating	(United States) Antoine Livingston	27.77

Records
- Highest scoring: Široki 103–108 Mladost (8 November 2021)
- Winning streak: 7 games Borac Banja Luka
- Losing streak: 9 games Vrijednosnice
- All statistics correct as of February 10, 2022.

The 2021–22 ABA League Second Division was the 5th season of the ABA Second Division with 14 teams from Bosnia and Herzegovina, Croatia, Montenegro, North Macedonia, Serbia, and Slovenia participating in it.

== Teams ==
A total of 14 teams contest the league for the 2021–22 season, based on the results in the domestic championships and taking into consideration the results in the previous season. On 31 August 2021, ABA League JTD announced 12 teams and availability for two teams to be filled by awarding wild cards. On 13 September, two clubs Široki and Zlatibor were awarded with wildcards fulfilling the remaining spots.

=== Distribution ===
The following is the access list for this season.

Access list for the 2021–22 ABA League Second Division
	Teams entering in this round	Teams advancing from the previous round
Regular season (14 teams)	2 highest-placed teams from each of the six national leagues at the end of regular season (12 in total); 2 teams with a wild card	
Playoffs (8 teams)		8 highest-placed teams from the regular season

=== Team allocation ===
Location of teams in the 2021–22 ABA League Second Division

The labels in the parentheses show how each team qualified for the place of its starting round:

- 1st–9th: Positions in national leagues at the end of regular season or playoffs.
- WC: Wild card

Regular season
(Bosnia and Herzegovina) Borac Banja Luka (2nd)	(Montenegro) Lovćen 1947 (2th)	(Serbia) Mladost MaxBet (1st)	(Slovenia) Helios Suns (3rd)
(Bosnia and Herzegovina) Spars (3rd)	(Montenegro) Sutjeska (3th)	(Serbia) Vojvodina (2nd)	(Slovenia) Rogaška (4th)
(Bosnia and Herzegovina) Široki (4th)^{WC}	(Montenegro) Podgorica (4th)^{Note CRO}	(Serbia) Zlatibor (3rd)^{WC}	
(Croatia) Vrijednosnice Osijek (9th)	(North Macedonia) Pelister (3rd)	(North Macedonia) MZT Skopje (1st)	

Note CRO: In July 2021, a Croatian team Adria Oil Škrljevo withdrew its bid to join the Alpe Adria Cup for the 2021–22 season. Also, another Croatian team Sonik-Puntamika withdrew its bid.

A Croatian team Gorica has been applied for the Alpe Adria Cup in the upcoming season, also. Following withdrew of Gorica, Vrijednosnice Osijek joined the league for the upcoming season. Since no other Croatian team applied, one more berth was given to Montenegro.

=== Personnel and sponsorship ===
Team	Home city	Head coach	Captain	Kit manufacturer	Shirt sponsor
Borac	Banja Luka	(Serbia) Dragan Nikolić		Kelme	—
Helios Suns	Domžale	(Slovenia) Dejan Jakara	(Slovenia) Aljaž Bratec	Spalding	Helios / Triglav
Lovćen 1947	Cetinje	(Montenegro) Petar Jovanović	(Montenegro) Nikola Borilović	GBT	—
Mladost MaxBet	Belgrade	(Serbia) Dragan Jakovljević	(Serbia) Marko Milenković	CK	MaxBet
MZT Skopje Aerodrom	Skopje	(North Macedonia) Aleksandar Petrović	(North Macedonia) Damjan Stojanovski	Spalding	UNIBanka
Pelister	Bitola	(North Macedonia) Marjan Ilievski		Unit sport	—
Podgorica	Podgorica	(Montenegro) Nebojša Bogavac		NetS	Bemax
Rogaška	Rogaška Slatina	(Slovenia) Damjan Novaković		Luanvi	—
Spars	Sarajevo	(Montenegro) Miodrag Kadija		No1	Visit Sarajevo
Sutjeska	Nikšić	(Montenegro) Darko Vujačić		Ardu Sport	—
Široki	Široki Brijeg	(Croatia) Danijel Jusup	(Bosnia and Herzegovina) Jure Zubac	Ardu Sport	TT Kabeli
Vojvodina	Novi Sad	(Serbia) Miroslav Nikolić	(Serbia) Aleksa Zarić	Peak	—
Vrijednosnice	Osijek	(Croatia) Marko Mandić	(Croatia) Šime Lisica	IDEko	VROS
Zlatibor	Čajetina	(Serbia) Strajin Nedović	(Serbia) Dušan Kutlešić	Ardu Sport	Boje i fasade Maxima

=== Coaching changes ===
Team	Outgoing manager	Date of vacancy	Position in table	Replaced with	Date of appointment	Ref.
Podgorica	(Montenegro) Zoran Kašćelan	June 2021	Off-season	(Montenegro) Nebojša Bogavac	18 June 2021	
Široki	(Croatia) Damir Vujanović	July 2021	Off-season	(Croatia) Danijel Jusup	21 June 2021	
Spars	(Montenegro) Miodrag Kadija	August 2021	Off-season	(Montenegro) Zoran Kašćelan	25 August 2021	
Spars	(Montenegro) Zoran Kašćelan	31 December 2021	7th (4–3)	(Montenegro) Miodrag Kadija	31 December 2021	
MZT Skopje Aerodrom	(North Macedonia) Darko Radulović	27 February 2022	2nd (8–2)	(North Macedonia) Aleksandar Petrović	27 February 2022	
Sutjeska	(Serbia) Velimir Gašić	21 March 2022	7th (6–4)	(Montenegro) Darko Vujačić	21 March 2022	

== Venues ==
The Regular season is divided in five tournaments. The hosts are Zlatibor in Serbia, Osijek in Croatia, and Banja Luka, Sarajevo, and Široki Brijeg in Bosnia and Herzegovina.

(Serbia) Zlatibor, Čajetina	2021–22 ABA League Second Division (Yugoslavia)	(Bosnia and Herzegovina) Sarajevo	(Bosnia and Herzegovina) Široki Brijeg
TRC Zlatibor Hall	2021–22 ABA League Second Division (Yugoslavia)	Arena Hills Sports Hall	Pecara Sports Hall
Capacity: 2,500	2021–22 ABA League Second Division (Yugoslavia)	Capacity: N/A	Capacity: 4,500
(Croatia) Osijek	2021–22 ABA League Second Division (Yugoslavia)	(Bosnia and Herzegovina) Banja Luka	(North Macedonia) Skopje
Gradski vrt Hall	2021–22 ABA League Second Division (Yugoslavia)	Borik Sports Hall	Jane Sandanski Arena
Capacity: 4,448	2021–22 ABA League Second Division (Yugoslavia)	Capacity: 3,060	Capacity: 7,500

== Schedule ==
The schedule of the competition will be as follows.

Schedule for 2021–22 ABA League Second Division
Phase	Round	Location	First leg
Regular season	Round 1	Zlatibor	10–13 October 2021
Regular season	Round 2	Zlatibor	13–15 October 2021
Regular season	Round 3	Osijek	8–10 November 2021
Regular season	Round 4	Osijek	10–12 November 2021
Regular season	Round 5	Sarajevo	13–15 December 2021
Regular season	Round 6	Sarajevo	15–17 December 2021
Regular season	Round 7	Sarajevo	17–19 December 2021
Regular season	Round 8	Banja Luka	6–8 February 2022
Regular season	Round 9	Banja Luka	8–10 February 2022
Regular season	Round 10	Banja Luka	10–12 February 2022
Regular season	Round 11	Široki Brijeg	21–23 March 2022
Regular season	Round 12	Široki Brijeg	23–25 March 2022
Regular season	Round 13	Široki Brijeg	25–27 March 2022
Playoffs	Quarterfinals	Skopje	13 April 2022
Playoffs	Semifinals	Skopje	15 April 2022
Playoffs	Final	Skopje	17 April 2022

Originally scheduled for 17–23 January 2022, the Banja Luka Tournament was rescheduled to 6–12 February due to COVID-19 outbreaks.

== Regular season ==
The Regular season is split in five tournaments featuring two or three rounds.

=== League table ===
Pos	Team	Pld	W	L	PF	PA	PD	Pts	Qualification or relegation
1	(North Macedonia) MZT Skopje Aerodrom	13	10	3	1074	998	+76	23	Advance to the Playoffs
2	(Slovenia) Helios Suns	13	10	3	1113	1011	+102	23	Advance to the Playoffs
3	(Bosnia and Herzegovina) Borac Banja Luka	13	9	4	1117	1000	+117	22	Advance to the Playoffs
4	(Bosnia and Herzegovina) Široki	13	9	4	1158	1076	+82	22	Advance to the Playoffs
5	(Bosnia and Herzegovina) Spars	13	8	5	1049	1024	+25	21	Advance to the Playoffs
6	(Serbia) Mladost MaxBet	13	8	5	1222	1184	+38	21	Advance to the Playoffs
7	(Serbia) Zlatibor	13	8	5	1025	1016	+9	21	Advance to the Playoffs
8	(Montenegro) Sutjeska	13	7	6	945	966	−21	20	Advance to the Playoffs
9	(Serbia) Vojvodina	13	6	7	996	989	+7	19	
10	(Montenegro) Podgorica	13	5	8	969	989	−20	18	
11	(North Macedonia) Pelister	13	4	9	1079	1112	−33	17	
12	(Slovenia) Rogaška	13	3	10	1019	1085	−66	16	
13	(Montenegro) Lovćen 1947	13	3	10	1075	1207	−132	16	
14	(Croatia) Vrijednosnice	13	1	12	931	1115	−184	14	

Source: ABA2

=== Results ===
Home \ Away	BOR	HEL	LOV	MLA	MZT	OSI	PEL	POD	ROG	SPA	SUT	ŠIR	VOJ	ZLA
Borac Banja Luka	—	—	—	—	—	89–78	—	—	89–87	83–62	74–75	—	74–76	87–75
Helios Suns	99–93	—	—	88–68	—	—	85–81	90–95	—	83–77	65–57	—	77–76	—
Lovćen 1947	71–98	80–94	—	90–114	—	—	108–85	76–75	—	—	79–87	—	81–83	—
Mladost Maxbet	87–92	—	—	—	—	85–77	—	—	102–98	98–102	88–80	—	93–90	—
MZT Skopje Aerodrom	80–73	94–88	100–81	97–90	—	—	80–64	76–75	—	—	—	—	83–75	—
Vrijednosnice	—	67–84	76–94	—	73–83	—	—	—	85–84	—	—	78–99	—	53–73
Pelister	86–101	—	—	99–83	—	97–78	—	—	—	97–90	93–73	—	66–75	—
Podgorica	55–70	—	—	69–96	—	73–63	79–67	—	80–68	—	—	—	—	66–73
Rogaška	—	60–93	89–81	—	80–64	—	92–79	—	—	—	—	80–88	—	60–71
Spars	—	—	87–59	—	77–87	82–74	—	74–84	93–78	—	—	69–63	—	76–71
Sutjeska	—	—	—	—	56–55	80–68	—	73–65	79–73	79–86	—	58–81	—	72–73
Široki	69–94	94–91	120–95	103–108	78–91	—	83–82	92–91	—	—	—	—	—	—
Vojvodina	—	—	—	—	—	92–61	—	71–62	81–70	68–74	66–76	69–93	—	74–79
Zlatibor	—	69–76	99–80	99–110	88–84	—	85–83	—	—	—	—	70–95	—	—

Source: ABA2
Legend: Blue = home team win; Red = away team win.
Matches with lighter background shading were decided after overtime.

== Playoffs ==
Based on the results and position of the clubs in the standings after the regular season, Playoffs will take place with teams from 1st to 8th position. The Quarterfinals will be played in knockout pairs 1–8, 2–7, 3–6, 4–5. The winners of the Quarterfinals will qualify to the Semifinals and the winners of the Semifinals will play the Final.

=== Bracket ===
Quarterfinals
13 April 2022
3 (Bosnia and Herzegovina) Borac Banja Luka	80
6 (Serbia) Mladost MaxBet	79
13 April 2022
2 (Slovenia) Helios Suns	82
7 (Serbia) Zlatibor	84
13 April 2022
4 (Bosnia and Herzegovina) Široki	85
5 (Bosnia and Herzegovina) Spars Ilidža	81
13 April 2022
1 (North Macedonia) MZT Skopje Aerodrom	73
8 (Montenegro) Sutjeska	68

Semifinals
15 April 2022
3 (Bosnia and Herzegovina) Borac Banja Luka	83
7 (Serbia) Zlatibor	98
15 April 2022
4 (Bosnia and Herzegovina) Široki	71
1 (North Macedonia) MZT Skopje Aerodrom	75

Final
17 April 2022
7 (Serbia) Zlatibor (OT)	78
1 (North Macedonia) MZT Skopje Aerodrom	73

== See also ==
- 2021–22 ABA League First Division

2021–22 domestic competitions

- 2021–22 Basketball Championship of Bosnia and Herzegovina
- (Croatia) 2021–22 HT Premijer liga
- (Montenegro) 2021–22 Prva A liga
- (North Macedonia) 2021–22 Macedonian First League
- 2021–22 Basketball League of Serbia
- (Slovenia) 2021–22 Slovenian Basketball League
