= KK Zlatibor =

Basketball club in Čajetina, Serbia

Zlatibor
- Leagues: Basketball League of Serbia; ABA League Second Division
- Founded: 16 September 1979; 45 years ago
- History: KK Zlatibor; 1979–present
- Arena: Čajetina Sports Hall
- Location: Čajetina, Serbia
- Team colors: Blue, Orange and White
- President: Rajko Pelverović
- General manager: Đorđe Aleksandrić
- Head coach: Strajin Nedović
- Championships: 1 ABA League 2; 1 National League Cup
- Retired numbers: 1 (14)
- Website: www.kkzlatibor.rs
Home	Away

Košarkaški klub Zlatibor (Serbian Cyrillic: Кошаркашки клуб Златибор, English: Zlatibor Basketball Club), commonly referred to as KK Zlatibor or Zlatibor Gold Gondola due to sponsorship reasons, is a men's professional basketball club based in Čajetina, Serbia. They are currently competing in the Basketball League of Serbia and the ABA League Second Division

== History ==
Basketball beginnings in Čajetina came with the success of amateur sports competition in western Serbia known as the MOSI. Pioneers of basketball in Čajetina, Sead Begović, and Radomir Raković among the others founded KK Zlatibor on 19 September 1979. The first club president was Aleksandar Vasiljević. Most of its history, Zlatibor played in 3rd-tier league West Division with several attempts of attacking 1st place which leads to the higher league. Finally, in 2015 after the win against neighbor-team Priboj from Priboj, the club got promoted to the Second League of Serbia. In the 2016–17 season, Zlatibor won the Second League and got promoted to the Basketball League of Serbia for the 2017–18 season. That year Zlatibor ended up in 4th place which took them to the second phase – Basketball League of Serbia. After group phase and matches against Crvena Zvezda, Borac, Mega Bemax, Tamiš, and Mladost, the club advanced to the playoffs with a 4–6 record. The same year, the club won the 2018 Cup of Serbia, advancing to quarterfinals of the 2018 Radivoj Korać Cup.

Zlatibor recognized four former players for great achievements in the club's history as the Legends: Sead Begović, Radomir Raković, Želimir Džambić, and Duško Pantović.

In April 2022, Zlatibor won the ABA League Second Division for the 2021–22 season following a 78–73 overtime win over MZT Skopje Aerodrom. In June 2022, Zlatibor got an invitation from the FIBA Basketball Champions League for the 2022–23 season. Later, they withdrawn. In June 2022, the club added retired NBA Player Nikola Peković to its managing board.

== Players ==
=== Retired numbers ===
KK Zlatibor retired numbers
No	Nat.	Player	Position	Tenure	Ref.
14	(Serbia and Montenegro)	Želimir Džambić	SG	1980–2000	

=== Current roster ===
Note: Flags indicate national team eligibility at FIBA-sanctioned events. Players may hold other non-FIBA nationalities not displayed.

KK Zlatibor roster
Players
Coaches

Pos.	No.	Nat.	Name	Ht.	Age
PF	44	(Serbia)	Curcic, Vasilije	2.06 m (6 ft 9 in)	33 – 11 October 1991
PG	3	(Serbia)	Protić, Nemanja	1.82 m (6 ft 0 in)	39 – 13 August 1986
PF	4	(Serbia)	Čabrilo, Aleksa	2.06 m (6 ft 9 in)	27 – 16 November 1997
SF	7	(Serbia)	Đuran, Filip	1.98 m (6 ft 6 in)	34 – 4 July 1991
SG	9	(Slovenia)	Grubelič, Sandi	1.96 m (6 ft 5 in)	30 – 3 October 1994
SG	10	(Serbia)	Đukanović, Brano	1.96 m (6 ft 5 in)	30 – 21 March 1995
C	11	(Serbia)	Milošević, Lazar	2.05 m (6 ft 9 in)	21 – 8 April 2004
F	13	(Serbia)	Matović, Andrija	1.98 m (6 ft 6 in)	21 – 25 September 2003
SF	21	(Serbia)	Joksimović, Lazar	2.03 m (6 ft 8 in)	23 – 6 January 2002
PG	22	(Serbia)	Tadić, Tadija	1.94 m (6 ft 4 in)	26 – 22 April 1999
SG	24	(Serbia)	Ponjavić, Aleksandar	2.00 m (6 ft 7 in)	34 – 3 March 1991
SG	33	(Serbia)	Čorbić, Boško	1.91 m (6 ft 3 in)	30 – 9 August 1995
F/C	35	(Serbia)	Tejić, Marko	2.10 m (6 ft 11 in)	30 – 4 August 1995
PG	44	(Serbia)	Tejić, Bogdan	1.90 m (6 ft 3 in)	24 – 18 January 2001

Head coach

- (Serbia) Strajin Nedović

Legend

- (C) Team captain
- Injured

- Roster
Updated: December 9, 2022

== Coaches ==
- (Montenegro) Mladen Šekularac (2015)
- (Serbia) Predrag Jaćimović (2015–2016)
- (Serbia) Dušan Radović (2016–2017)
- (Serbia) Vanja Guša (2017–2019)
- (Serbia) Strajin Nedović (2019–present)

== Trophies and awards ==
=== Trophies ===
- ABA League Second Division
  - Winner (1): 2021–22
- Second League of Serbia (2nd-tier)
  - Winner (1): 2016–17
- First Regional League of Serbia (3rd-tier)
  - Winner (1): 2014–15
- League Cup of Serbia (2nd-tier)
  - Winner (1): 2017–18

=== Individual awards ===
- ABA League Second Division MVP Award (1):
  - (Serbia) Dušan Kutlešić – 2021–22
- Serbian League MVP Award (1):
  - (Serbia) Dušan Kutlešić – 2021–22

== Notable players ==
- (Cameroon) Robert Songolo Ngijol
- (Serbia) Nikola Vasić
- (Montenegro) Mladen Šekularac
