= KK Sloboda Užice =

Basketball club in Užice, Serbia

Sloboda Užice
- Nickname: The Ere
- Leagues: Basketball League of Serbia
- Founded: 1950; 76 years ago
- History: List: KK Sloboda 1950–1962 KK Sevojno 1962–1972 KK Raketa 1972–1976 KK Prvi partizan 1976–1991 KK Užice 1991–2001 KK Forma Play Off 2001–2004 KK Gradina 2004–2006 KK Sloboda 2006–present
- Arena: Veliki Park Sports Hall (capacity: 2,200)
- Location: Užice, Serbia
- Team colors: White, Red and Black
- General manager: Ratko Radovanović
- Head coach: Oliver Popović
- Championships: 1 Second League; 1 Regional League
| Home | Away |

Košarkaški klub Sloboda (Serbian Cyrillic: Кошаркашки клуб Слобода), commonly referred to as KK Sloboda Užice, is a men's professional basketball club based in Užice, Serbia. The club currently participates in the Basketball League of Serbia. They play home matches in the Veliki Park Sports Hall.

== History ==
In November 1949 a group of high school students become interested in basketball and staged two friendly matches. In January 1950 the first basketball tournament was held in Titovo Užice. That same year two basketball teams were formed: one at the City Gymnastic Society, and the other at the Sports Association "Prvi partizan". Later on, the basketball players from the City Gymnastics Society moved to the Sports Association "Sloboda" to form a new basketball team. A female team was formed then. In 1953, basketball team evolved into the Basketball club Sloboda.

Interest in the club increased in 1957. In January 1958, a traditional basketball tournament was organized by the Crvena zvezda, the Sloboda players showed a great interest. Also, the club began to contest in the Basketball Cup of Yugoslavia. Basketball club Sloboda since then has been in the 3rd tier of Yugoslav basketball competition, SR Serbia Republic League.

Copper Mill Sevojno became the club's patron in 1962 and the basketball club changed its name to Sevojno. In 1972 the club changed its name to Raketa (English: Rocket), after moving to Rocket Sport Society. its name to Prvi partizan, which was maintained until 1991. The club's greatest achievement was the participation in the Yugoslav First Federal League in the 1988–89 season. Playing along with the great basketball clubs such as the Partizan Belgrade, Red Star Belgrade, Jugoplastika Split, Cibona Zagreb, Olimpija Ljubljana and others, the club placed 11th.

After the dissolution of SFR Yugoslavia, the club continues to compete in the FR Yugoslavia First League. In the 1991–92 season, the club placed 7th, but the next season it was relegated. From 1991 to 2006 the club changed its name four times. By 2001, the club was called Užice. Then from 2001 to 2004, Forma Play Off. From 2004 to 2006, Gradina. After 53 years of its existence the club has returned to its original name. Sloboda.

The club won the Serbian Regional League 2006–07 season title and was promoted to the Basketball League of Serbia B. The club spent two seasons there and due to poor results in second season it has been relegated. In the season 2009–10 the club competed in the Serbian League, but they agreed with the Mašinac to replace rank because of difficult financial situation in Kraljevo. The Sloboda moved to the Basketball League of Serbia and BC Mašinac moved to the Serbian League and received a fee of 5 million dinars.

In its debut season in top flight men's basketball competition in Serbia, Sloboda has been ranked 9th, with 12 wins and 14 defeats. Next season the club has ranked a place lower than last year with 11 wins and 15 defeats. In 2013 Sloboda had increased its reputation when club history reached the 2013 Radivoj Korać Cup quarterfinal contesting the Serbian powerhouse Partizan.

== Home arena ==
The Veliki Park Sports Hall is a multi-purpose indoor arena located in Užice and it has a capacity of 2,200 seats.

== Supporters ==
The organized supporters of the Sloboda Užice sports association are known as the Freedom Fighters. Besides a football club, they also support the Sloboda basketball team.

== Players ==
=== Current roster ===
Note: Flags indicate national team eligibility at FIBA-sanctioned events. Players may hold other non-FIBA nationalities not displayed.

Sloboda Užice roster
Players
Coaches

| Pos. | No. | Nat. | Name | Ht. | Age |
|---|---|---|---|---|---|
| SF | 3 | (Serbia) | Prijović, Nedeljko | 2.03 m (6 ft 8 in) | 29 – 26 June 1996 |
| C | 4 | (Serbia) | Bogićević, Petar | 2.06 m (6 ft 9 in) | 23 – 12 June 2002 |
| SG | 6 | (Serbia) | Ćubić, Aleksa | 2.02 m (6 ft 8 in) | 25 – 30 April 2000 |
| PF | 7 | (Slovenia) | Novak, Jan | 2.00 m (6 ft 7 in) | 30 – 7 July 1995 |
| PG | 9 | (Serbia) | Aksentijević, Luka | 1.87 m (6 ft 2 in) | 24 – 22 January 2002 |
| SG | 10 | (Serbia) | Božić, Đorđe | 1.95 m (6 ft 5 in) | 25 – 5 February 2001 |
| F | 11 | (Serbia) | Blagojević, Nikola | 2.01 m (6 ft 7 in) | 24 – 8 February 2002 |
| PF | 12 | (Serbia) | Ilić, Aleksa | 2.05 m (6 ft 9 in) | 25 – 11 May 2000 |
| C | 15 | (Serbia) | Miladinović, David | 2.09 m (6 ft 10 in) | 28 – 18 May 1997 |
| C | 17 | (Montenegro) | Matović, Radomir | 2.16 m (7 ft 1 in) | 25 – 23 August 2000 |
| SF | 18 | (Serbia) | Matić, Čedomir | 2.05 m (6 ft 9 in) | 23 – 19 March 2003 |
| PG | 25 | (Serbia) | Dimitrijević, Đorđe | 1.88 m (6 ft 2 in) | 29 – 6 February 1997 |

Head coach

- (Serbia) Oliver Popović

Legend

- (C) Team captain
- (L) On loan
- (TW) Two-way affiliate player
- Injured

- Roster
Updated: December 31, 2021

== Coaches ==
- (Socialist Federal Republic of Yugoslavia) Slobodan Janković (1990–1991)
- (Federal Republic of Yugoslavia) Petar Rodić (1991–1992)
- (Federal Republic of Yugoslavia) Slobodan Janković (1992–1993)
- (Federal Republic of Yugoslavia) Ivan Obućina (1994–1995)
- (Federal Republic of Yugoslavia) Aleksandar Aćimović (2000–2001)
- (Serbia) Miroslav Radošević (2010–2011)
- (Serbia) Miloš Obrenović (2011–2012)
- (Serbia) Vladimir Đokić (2012–2013)
- (Montenegro) Mladen Šekularac (2015–2016)
- (Serbia) Vladimir Lučić (2017–2020)
- (Serbia) Oliver Popović (2020–present)

== Trophies and awards ==
=== Trophies ===
- Yugoslav Federal B League (2nd tier)
  - Winner (1): 1987–88
- Serbian Second League (2nd tier)
  - Winner (1): 2017–18
- Serbian Regional League (3rd tier)
  - Winner (1): 2006–07

== International record ==
| Season | Achievement | Notes |
FIBA Korać Cup
| 1992–93 | Second round | Eliminated by MOL Szolnoki Olajbányász, 0–4 (0–2) |
