= 2018–19 KK Crvena zvezda season =

Serbian basketball club season

Crvena zvezda mts
2018–19 season
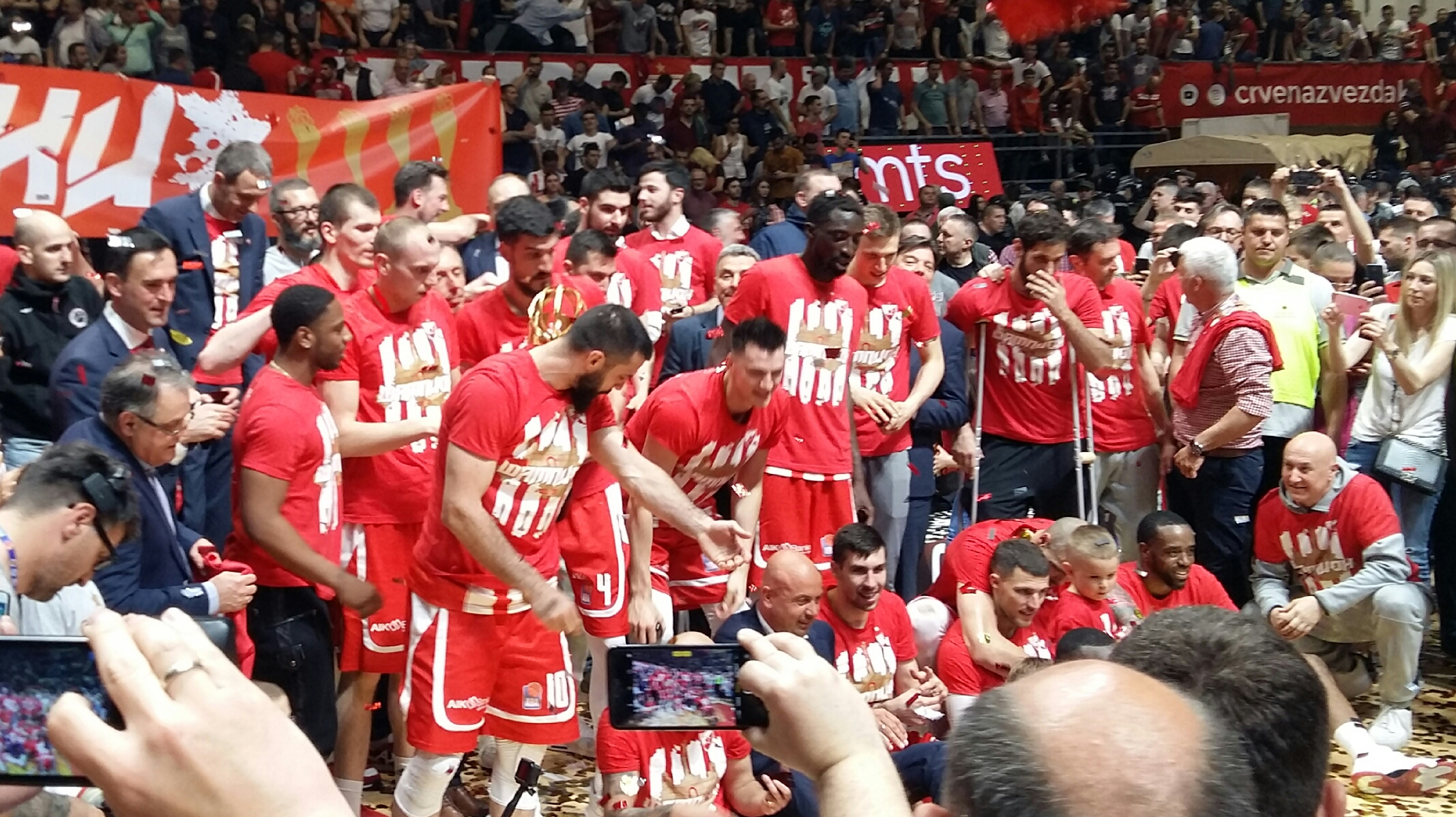
- Adriatic Championship celebration after the Adriatic Finals Game 5
- President: (Serbia) Nebojša Čović
- Head coach: (Serbia) Milan Tomić
- Arena: Aleksandar Nikolić Hall
- ABA League: 1st
- Playoffs: Champions
- Serbian League: 1st (Group A)
- Playoffs: Champions
- EuroCup: Top 16
- Radivoj Korać Cup: Runners-up
- Adriatic Supercup: Winners
- Highest home attendance: 6,858; 84–63 Partizan (6 April 2019)
- Lowest home attendance: 367; 83–57 Zlatibor (18 May 2019)
- Average home attendance: 5,011 (EuroCup); 4,564 (Adriatic League); 2,687 (Serbian League)
- Biggest win: 97–54 Budućnost VOLI (22 April 2019)
- Biggest defeat: 75–91 Monaco (14 November 2018); 76–92 Valencia Basket (16 January 2019); 68–84 Cedevita (26 January 2019)
| Home | Away |
- All statistics correct as of June 18, 2019.

The 2018–19 season was the 74th Crvena zvezda season in the existence of the club. The team played in the Basketball League of Serbia, in the Adriatic League and in the EuroCup.

Crvena zvezda won their first Adriatic Supercup trophy, the fourth Adriatic League Championship, and the 20th National Championship.

== Overview ==
In summer 2018 the team started with signing Milan Tomić as a head coach. Soon to follow were the players Billy Baron, Michael Ojo and two centers from Radonjić era: Maik Zirbes and Dušan Ristić. Zvezda also added experienced Stratos Perperoglou and Mouhammad Faye, as well as point guard Joe Ragland. The last one to sign was combo guard Nemanja Nenadić from development team FMP.

After the end of the 2017–18 season, Stefan Janković decided to part ways with Crvena zvezda even though he was under contract with them, with both parties having different views on his contract status. His contract status was since then under review by the Basketball Federation of Serbia and FIBA.

Crvena zvezda started the season well, convincingly winning ABA Super Cup tournament by beating last season ABA champion Budućnost in the final game. Tomić struck a great balance between hard defense and versatile offense, causing team to grab the first spot at the beginning of ABA League, as well as the EuroCup Group A. Bad streak in EuroCup during November caused the Zvezda to finish group phase on the third spot, which was still good enough for it to advance to the next stage. In ABA, Zvezda ended the first part of the season with 11-0, having defeated every opponent in the league.

== Players ==
=== Squad information ===
Note: Flags indicate national team eligibility at FIBA-sanctioned events. Players may hold other non-FIBA nationalities not displayed.

Crvena zvezda mts roster
Players
Coaches

| Pos. | No. | Nat. | Name | Ht. | Wt. | Age |
|---|---|---|---|---|---|---|
| SG | 12 | (United States) | Baron, Billy | 1.88 m (6 ft 2 in) | 88 kg (194 lb) | 35 – 11 December 1990 |
| PG | 3 | (Serbia) | Čović, Filip | 1.80 m (5 ft 11 in) | 72 kg (159 lb) | 37 – 5 June 1989 |
| G/F | 7 | (Serbia) | Davidovac, Dejan | 2.03 m (6 ft 8 in) | 95 kg (209 lb) | 31 – 17 January 1995 |
| G/F | 13 | (Serbia) | Dobrić, Ognjen | 2.00 m (6 ft 7 in) | 93 kg (205 lb) | 31 – 27 October 1994 |
| PF | 11 | (Senegal) | Faye, Mouhammad | 2.08 m (6 ft 10 in) | 98 kg (216 lb) | 41 – 14 September 1985 |
| SF | 4 | (Serbia) | Kešelj, Marko | 2.06 m (6 ft 9 in) | 94 kg (207 lb) | 38 – 2 January 1988 |
| G/F | 10 | (Serbia) | Lazić, Branko (C) | 1.95 m (6 ft 5 in) | 91 kg (201 lb) | 37 – 12 January 1989 |
| G | 9 | (Serbia) | Nenadić, Nemanja | 1.97 m (6 ft 6 in) | 88 kg (194 lb) | 32 – 2 January 1994 |
| C | 50 | (Nigeria) | Ojo, Michael | 2.16 m (7 ft 1 in) | 138 kg (304 lb) | 33 – 5 January 1993 |
| SF | 5 | (Greece) | Perperoglou, Stratos (injured) | 2.03 m (6 ft 8 in) | 104 kg (229 lb) | 42 – 7 August 1984 |
| G/F | 2 | (Serbia) | Radanov, Aleksa | 2.02 m (6 ft 8 in) | 84 kg (185 lb) | 28 – 1 February 1998 |
| PG | 1 | (United States) | Ragland, Joe (injured) | 1.82 m (6 ft 0 in) | 80 kg (176 lb) | 36 – 11 November 1989 |
| C | 14 | (Serbia) | Ristić, Dušan | 2.14 m (7 ft 0 in) | 111 kg (245 lb) | 30 – 27 November 1995 |
| SG | 23 | (United States) | Rivers, K. C. | 1.96 m (6 ft 5 in) | 97 kg (214 lb) | 39 – 1 March 1987 |
| PF | 22 | (Serbia) | Simanić, Boriša | 2.13 m (7 ft 0 in) | 92 kg (203 lb) | 28 – 20 March 1998 |

Head coach

- (Serbia) Milan Tomić

Assistant coach(es)

- (Serbia) Andrija Gavrilović
- (Serbia) Milenko Topić
- (Serbia) Saša Kosović

Strength & conditioning coach(es)

- (Serbia) Aleksandar Lukman

Team manager

- (Serbia) Nebojša Ilić

Legend

- (C) Team captain
- Injured

- Roster
- Transactions
Updated: May 3, 2019

=== Players with multiple nationalities ===
- (Nigeria) (United States) Michael Ojo
- (United States) (Liberia) Joe Ragland
- (United States) (Guinea-Bissau) K. C. Rivers

=== Depth chart ===
| Pos. | Starting 5 | Bench 1 | Bench 2 | Reserves |
|---|---|---|---|---|
| C | Michael Ojo | Dušan Ristić |
| PF | Mouhammad Faye | Boriša Simanić | Marko Kešelj |
| SF | Branko Lazić | Ognjen Dobrić | | Stratos Perperoglou (injured) |
| SG | Billy Baron | K. C. Rivers | | Aleksa Radanov |
| PG | Dejan Davidovac | Filip Čović | Nemanja Nenadić | Joe Ragland (injured) |

=== On loan ===
KK Crvena zvezda players out on loan
| Nat. | Player | Position | Team | On loan since |
| (Serbia) | Petar Rakićević | SG/SF | (Serbia) Dynamic VIP PAY | November 2017 |
| (Serbia) | Stefan Lazarević | SG/SF | (Serbia) FMP | December 2017 |
| (Serbia) | Stefan Đorđević | PF | (Serbia) FMP | August 2018 |
| (Serbia) | Zoran Paunović | SG | (Serbia) FMP | August 2018 |
| (Serbia) | Nikola Jovanović | PF/C | (Italy) Dolomiti Energia Trento | August 2018 |
| (Serbia) | Ranko Simović | SF | (Serbia) Vršac (Serbia) FMP | August 2018 – March 2019; April 2019 |

=== Players In ===
| Pos. | # | Player | Moving from | Date | Ref. |
|---|---|---|---|---|---|
| PG | 12 | (United States) Billy Baron | (Turkey) Eskişehir | 14 July 2018 | |
| C | 14 | (Serbia) Dušan Ristić | (United States) Arizona | 15 July 2018 | |
| C | 33 | (Germany) Maik Zirbes | (Germany) Bayern Munich | 17 July 2018 | |
| C | 50 | (Nigeria) Michael Ojo | (Serbia) FMP | 18 July 2018 | |
| SF | 5 | (Greece) Stratos Perperoglou | (Israel) Hapoel Jerusalem | 3 August 2018 | |
| PF | 11 | (Senegal) Mouhammad Faye | (Greece) Promitheas Patras | 4 August 2018 | |
| PG | 1 | (United States) Joe Ragland | (Russia) Lokomotiv Kuban | 10 August 2018 | |
| PF | 22 | (Serbia) Boriša Simanić | (Serbia) FMP (Loan return) | 13 August 2018 | |
| SG/PG | 9 | (Serbia) Nemanja Nenadić | (Serbia) FMP | 14 September 2018 | |
| SG/SF | 23 | (United States) K. C. Rivers | (Italy) Reggio Emilia | 11 February 2019 | |

Source: ABA League

=== Players Out ===
| Pos. | # | Player | Moving to | Date | Ref. |
|---|---|---|---|---|---|
| PF/C | 12 | (North Macedonia) Pero Antić | Retired | July 2018 | |
| PF/C | 26 | (France) Mathias Lessort | (Spain) Unicaja | 30 July 2018 | |
| SG | 14 | (Dominican Republic) James Feldeine | (Israel) Hapoel Jerusalem | 11 August 2018 | |
| PF/C | 32 | (Serbia) Nikola Jovanović | (Italy) Trento (Loan) | 16 August 2018 | |
| PG | 22 | (Montenegro) Taylor Rochestie | (China) Tianjin Gold Lions | 19 August 2018 | |
| SF | 6 | (Serbia) Nemanja Dangubić | (Germany) Bayern Munich | 18 September 2018 | |
| C | 23 | (Slovenia) Alen Omić | (Montenegro) Budućnost VOLI | 25 September 2018 | |
| PF/C | 16 | (Serbia) Stefan Janković | (Serbia) Partizan NIS | 22 October 2018 | |
| PF/C | — | (Serbia) Dragan Apić^{1} | (Russia) Lokomotiv Kuban | 18 January 2019 | |
| C | 33 | (Germany) Maik Zirbes | (China) Guangxi Weizhuang | 3 May 2019 | |

Notes:

- ^{1} On loan during the 2018–19 ABA season.

== Club ==
=== Technical Staff ===
| Position | Staff member |
|---|---|
| General Manager | (Serbia) Filip Sunturlić |
| Sports Director | (Serbia) Nebojša Ilić |
| Team Manager | (Serbia) Nebojša Ilić |
| Head Coach | (Serbia) (Greece) Milan Tomić |
| Assistant Coaches | (Serbia) (Italy) Andrija Gavrilović |
| Assistant Coaches | (Serbia) Milenko Topić |
| Assistant Coaches | (Serbia) (Bosnia and Herzegovina) Saša Kosović |
| Conditioning Coach | (Serbia) Aleksandar Lukman |
| Physiotherapist | (Serbia) Milorad Ćirić |
| Doctors | (Serbia) Nebojša Mitrović |
| Doctors | (Serbia) Boris Gluščević |

Source: Crvena zvezda Staff Archived 2017-09-28 at the Wayback Machine

=== Technical Staff changes ===
| Change | Date | Staff member | Staff position | Ref. |
|---|---|---|---|---|
| Out | June 2018 | (Serbia) Davor Ristović | General Manager | |
| Out | 13 July 2018 | (Serbia) Milenko Topić | Interim Head Coach | |
| In | 13 July 2018 | (Serbia) (Greece) Milan Tomić | Head coach | |
| Out | 15 July 2018 | (Serbia) Aleksandar Jovančević | Conditioning Coach | |
| In | 15 July 2018 | (Serbia) Aleksandar Lukman | Conditioning Coach | |
| In | 21 July 2018 | (Serbia) (Italy) Andrija Gavrilović | Assistant Coach | |
| Out | 21 July 2018 | (Serbia) Slobodan Ljubotina | Assistant Coach | |
| Out | 21 July 2018 | (Serbia) (Croatia) Aleksandar Zarić | Assistant Coach | |

=== Kit ===
- Supplier: Nike
- Main sponsor: mts
- Left shoulder sponsor: Mitsubishi Motors
- Back sponsor: Idea (top), Komercijalna banka (bottom)
- Shorts sponsor: AIK Banka

| Home | Away |

== Pre-season and friendlies ==
Win Loss

| 29 August 2018 1 | Crvena zvezda mts (Serbia) | 100–54 | (Germany) HAKRO Crailsheim Merlins | Belgrade |
| | Scoring by quarter: 24–15, 27–12, 19–13, 30–14 |
| | Pts: Ragland 13; Rebs: Zirbes 10; Asts: Čović 8 PIR: not available | Boxscore | Pts: not available Rebs: not available Asts: not available PIR: not available | Arena: Aleksandar Nikolić Hall; Attendance: 30; Referees: not available |

| 2 September 2018 2 | Crvena zvezda mts (Serbia) | 100–63 | (Serbia) Dynamic | Belgrade |
| | Scoring by quarter: 31–20, 29–14, 22–13, 18–16 |
| | Pts: Perperoglou 13; Rebs: Ristić 7 Asts: Čović 6 PIR: not available | Boxscore | Pts: Glišić, Kutlešić 15; Rebs: not available Asts: Rakićević 5 PIR: not available | Arena: Aleksandar Nikolić Hall; Attendance: 30; Referees: not available |

| 8 September 2018 3 | Crvena zvezda mts (Serbia) | 94–63 | (Greece) AEK | Belgrade |
| 20:00 (EET) | Scoring by quarter: 22–16, 20–15, 30–17, 22–15 |
| | Pts: Perperoglou 13; Rebs: Ristić 9 Asts: Čović 10; PIR: not available | Boxscore | Pts: Mačiulis 15; Rebs: not available Asts: not available PIR: not available | Arena: Železnik Hall; Attendance: 30; Referees: not available |

| 12 September 2018 4 | Crvena zvezda mts (Serbia) | 83–77 | (Belgium) Telenet Giants Antwerp | Belgrade |
| 17:00 | Scoring by quarter: 15–18, 23–26, 19–24, 26–9 |
| | Pts: Ragland 17; Rebs: Ojo 10; Asts: Ragland 8 PIR: Ojo 24 | Boxscore | Pts: Lee 22; Rebs: Tate 8 Asts: Tate 6 PIR: Tate 22 | Arena: Aleksandar Nikolić Hall; Attendance: 50; Referees: not available |

| 14 September 2018 5 | Crvena zvezda mts (Serbia) | 88–77 | (Russia) Nizhny Novgorod | Belgrade |
| 19:00 | Scoring by quarter: 23–17, 21–22, 16–17, 28–21 |
| | Pts: Ojo 16; Rebs: Ristić 5 Asts: Čović 6 PIR: not available | Boxscore | Pts: Strebkov 15; Rebs: not available Asts: not available PIR: not available | Arena: Aleksandar Nikolić Hall; Attendance: 3,500; Referees: not available |

== Competitions ==
=== Overall ===
| Competition | Started round | Final position / round | First match | Last match |
|---|---|---|---|---|
| Adriatic League | Matchday 1 | Champions | September 28, 2018 | April 22, 2019 |
| EuroCup | Matchday 1 | Top 16 | October 2, 2018 | February 5, 2019 |
| Serbian Super League | Matchday 1 | Champions | April 27, 2019 | June 17, 2019 |
| Adriatic Supercup | Quarterfinals | Winner | September 21, 2018 | September 23, 2018 |
| Radivoj Korać Cup | Quarterfinals | Runners-up | February 17, 2019 | February 17, 2019 |

Updated to match played June 17, 2019
Source: Competitions

=== Overview ===
| Competition | Record | | | | | | | |
| Competition | Pld | W | D | L | PF | PA | PD | Win % |
|---|---|---|---|---|---|---|---|---|
| Adriatic League | 22 | 21 | 0 | 1 | 1,875 | 1,517 | +358 | 95.45 |
| Adriatic Playoffs | 8 | 5 | 0 | 3 | 704 | 593 | +111 | 62.50 |
| EuroCup | 10 | 6 | 0 | 4 | 825 | 768 | +57 | 60.00 |
| EuroCup Top 16 | 6 | 2 | 0 | 4 | 490 | 485 | +5 | 33.33 |
| Serbian SuperLeague | 10 | 10 | 0 | 0 | 854 | 630 | +224 | 100.00 |
| Serbian League Playoffs | 6 | 5 | 0 | 1 | 521 | 495 | +26 | 83.33 |
| Adriatic Supercup | 3 | 3 | 0 | 0 | 254 | 203 | +51 | 100.00 |
| Radivoj Korać Cup | 3 | 2 | 0 | 1 | 241 | 219 | +22 | 66.67 |
| Total | 68 | 54 | 0 | 14 | 5,764 | 4,910 | +854 | 79.41 |

Last updated: June 17, 2019
Source: Competitions

=== Adriatic League ===
==== Regular season ====
| Pos | Team | Pld | W | L | PF | PA | PD | Pts | Qualification or relegation |
|---|---|---|---|---|---|---|---|---|---|
| 1 | (Serbia) Crvena zvezda mts | 22 | 21 | 1 | 1875 | 1517 | +358 | 43 | Advance to the playoffs |
| 2 | (Croatia) Cedevita | 22 | 16 | 6 | 1924 | 1769 | +155 | 38 (Note: Cedevita 1–1, 1.02; Budućnost VOLI 1–1, 0.98) | Advance to the playoffs |
| 3 | (Montenegro) Budućnost VOLI | 22 | 16 | 6 | 1783 | 1636 | +147 | 38 | Advance to the playoffs |
| 4 | (Serbia) Partizan NIS | 22 | 14 | 8 | 1779 | 1663 | +116 | 36 | Advance to the playoffs |
| 5 | (Serbia) Mega Bemax | 22 | 10 | 12 | 1802 | 1880 | −78 | 32 (Note: Mega Bemax 1–1, 1.06; FMP 1–1, 0.94) | |

Source: ABA League

==== Results by round ====
| Round | 1 | 2 | 3 | 4 | 5 | 6 | 7 | 8 | 9 | 10 | 11 | 12 | 13 | 14 | 15 | 16 | 17 | 18 | 19 | 20 | 21 | 22 |
|---|---|---|---|---|---|---|---|---|---|---|---|---|---|---|---|---|---|---|---|---|---|---|
| Ground | H | A | H | H | A | H | A | H | A | H | A | A | H | A | A | H | A | H | A | H | A | H |
| Result | W | W | W | W | W | W | W | W | W | W | W | W | W | W | W | W | L | W | W | W | W | W |
| Position | 4 | 2 | 1 | 1 | 1 | 1 | 1 | 1 | 1 | 1 | 1 | 1 | 1 | 1 | 1 | 1 | 1 | 1 | 1 | 1 | 1 | 1 |

Last updated: March 16, 2019.
Source: Competitive matches
Ground: A = Away; H = Home; R = Rest. Result: L = Loss; W = Win; R = Rest; P = Postponed.

Win Loss

==== Matches ====
| 29 September 2018 1 | Crvena zvezda mts (Serbia) | 78–68 | (Croatia) Cibona | Belgrade |
| 20:00 | Scoring by quarter: 21–20, 21–15, 17–21, 19–12 |
| Arena Sport | Pts: Ragland 22; Rebs: Ojo 7 Asts: Ragland 7 PIR: Ragland 28 | Boxscore | Pts: M. Ljubičić 17; Rebs: M. Ljubičić 7 Asts: Bilinovac 5 PIR: M. Ljubičić, Rozić 19 | Arena: Aleksandar Nikolić Hall; Attendance: 3,987; Referees: Igor Dragojević, Mario Majkić, Branislav Mrdak |

| 7 October 2018 2 | Budućnost VOLI (Montenegro) | 71–87 | (Serbia) Crvena zvezda mts | Podgorica |
| 19:00 | Scoring by quarter: 13–22, 18–23, 19–22, 21–20 |
| Arena Sport | Pts: Gordić, Omić 11; Rebs: Omić 11; Asts: Gordić 6 PIR: Omić 23 | Boxscore | Pts: Perperoglou 20; Rebs: Baron, Zirbes 6 Asts: Ragland 11; PIR: Zirbes 25 | Arena: Morača Sports Center; Attendance: 5,248; Referees: Matej Boltauzer, Sreten Radović, Sašo Petek |

| 13 October 2018 3 | Crvena zvezda mts (Serbia) | 80–66 | (Slovenia) Krka | Belgrade |
| 17:00 | Scoring by quarter: 29–17, 17–15, 20–19, 14–15 |
| Arena Sport | Pts: Baron 13; Rebs: Ristić 6 Asts: Ragland 4 PIR: Ristić 15 | Boxscore | Pts: Marinelli 15; Rebs: Cinac 6 Asts: Marinelli 7 PIR: Marinelli 26 | Arena: Aleksandar Nikolić Hall; Attendance: 3,254; Referees: Saša Pukl, Uroš Nikolić, Dragan Kralj |

| 20 October 2018 4 | Crvena zvezda mts (Serbia) | 96–75 | (Bosnia and Herzegovina) Igokea | Belgrade |
| 21:00 | Scoring by quarter: 25–23, 27–21, 23–11, 21–20 |
| Arena Sport | Pts: Radanov 16; Rebs: Zirbes 5 Asts: Čović 10; PIR: Radanov 22 | Boxscore | Pts: Lešić 21; Rebs: Ilić 6 Asts: Talić 6 PIR: Lešić 20 | Arena: Aleksandar Nikolić Hall; Attendance: 2,347; Referees: Marko Juras, Milan Nedović, Radoš Arsenijević |

| 27 October 2018 5 | FMP (Serbia) | 72–81 | (Serbia) Crvena zvezda mts | Belgrade |
| 18:30 | Scoring by quarter: 12–25, 20–20, 17–15, 23–21 |
| Arena Sport | Pts: Apić 22; Rebs: Reath 8 Asts: Rebec 9 PIR: Apić 30 | Boxscore | Pts: Faye 18; Rebs: Ojo 8 Asts: Čović 6 PIR: Faye 22 | Arena: Železnik Hall; Attendance: 1,400; Referees: Uroš Obrknežević, Josip Radojković, Gordan Terlević |

| 3 November 2018 6 | Crvena zvezda mts (Serbia) | 94–79 | (Croatia) Cedevita | Belgrade |
| 21:00 | Scoring by quarter: 22–14, 28–20, 22–18, 22–27 |
| Arena Sport | Pts: Dobrić 17; Rebs: Zirbes 9 Asts: Perperoglou 6 PIR: Čović 21 | Boxscore | Pts: Bell 19; Rebs: Stipanović 7 Asts: Katić 3 PIR: Bell 22 | Arena: Aleksandar Nikolić Hall; Attendance: 4,673; Referees: Saša Pukl, Milivoje Jovčić, Matej Špendl |

| 10 November 2018 7 | Petrol Olimpija (Slovenia) | 60–83 | (Serbia) Crvena zvezda mts | Ljubljana |
| 17:00 | Scoring by quarter: 23–22, 13–21, 13–22, 11–18 |
| Arena Sport | Pts: Reynolds 17; Rebs: Jones 5 Asts: Reynolds 6 PIR: Reynolds 22 | Boxscore | Pts: Baron 17; Rebs: Ojo 10; Asts: Baron 6 PIR: Baron 20 | Arena: Arena Stožice; Attendance: 3,500; Referees: Tomislav Hordov, Sašo Petek, Vladan Šundić |

| 17 November 2018 8 | Crvena zvezda mts (Serbia) | 104–71 | (Montenegro) Mornar | Belgrade |
| 19:00 | Scoring by quarter: 23–16, 27–16, 25–27, 29–12 |
| Arena Sport | Pts: Baron 18; Rebs: Ojo 10; Asts: Ragland 9 PIR: Ojo 27 | Boxscore | Pts: Waller, Brown 19; Rebs: Luković, Sané 5 Asts: Brown 5 PIR: Waller 15 | Arena: Aleksandar Nikolić Hall; Attendance: 3,572; Referees: Damir Javor, Mario Majkić, Saša Babić |

| 24 November 2018 9 | Partizan NIS (Serbia) | 71–77 | (Serbia) Crvena zvezda mts | Belgrade |
| 17:00 | Scoring by quarter: 22–15, 19–23, 10–20, 20–19 |
| Arena Sport | Pts: Landale 18; Rebs: Landale, Janković 5 Asts: Nikolić 4 PIR: Landale 18 | Boxscore | Pts: Perperoglou 25; Rebs: Zirbes 8 Asts: Ragland 6 PIR: Perperoglou 30 | Arena: Aleksandar Nikolić Hall; Attendance: 6,500; Referees: Ilija Belošević, Milija Vojinović, Dragan Porobić |

| 8 December 2018 10 | Crvena zvezda mts (Serbia) | 97–70 | (Croatia) Zadar | Belgrade |
| 19:00 | Scoring by quarter: 22–16, 23–17, 34–20, 18–17 |
| Arena Sport | Pts: Ragland 17; Rebs: Davidovac 6 Asts: Ragland, Davidovac 6 PIR: Ragland 28 | Boxscore | Pts: Vaughn 16; Rebs: Brzoja 6 Asts: Brzoja 5 PIR: Božić 11 | Arena: Aleksandar Nikolić Hall; Attendance: 3,048; Referees: Sreten Radović, Igor Dragojević, Uroš Nikolić |

| 15 December 2018 11 | Mega Bemax (Serbia) | 68–78 | (Serbia) Crvena zvezda mts | Sremska Mitrovica |
| 19:00 | Scoring by quarter: 15–20, 10–22, 22–22, 21–14 |
| Arena Sport | Pts: Bitadze 23; Rebs: Bitadze, Mokoka 6 Asts: Ratkovica 5 PIR: Bitadze 25 | Boxscore | Pts: Perperoglou 17; Rebs: Faye 10; Asts: Perperoglou, Baron 4 PIR: Perperoglou 17 | Arena: Pinki Sports Hall; Attendance: 2,170; Referees: Miloš Koljenšić, Branislav Mrdak, Ivan Stefanović |

| 22 December 2018 12 | Cibona (Croatia) | 54–76 | (Serbia) Crvena zvezda mts | Zagreb |
| 17:00 | Scoring by quarter: 18–24, 13–14, 17–22, 6–16 |
| Arena Sport | Pts: M. Ljubičić 17; Rebs: K. Ljubičić 6 Asts: Markota 3 PIR: M. Ljubičić 22 | Boxscore | Pts: Baron 16; Rebs: Ojo 10; Asts: Ragland 5 PIR: Ojo, Baron 26 | Arena: Dražen Petrović Basketball Hall; Attendance: 1,000; Referees: Damir Javor, Tomislav Hordov, Matej Špendl |

| 29 December 2018 13 | Crvena zvezda mts (Serbia) | 86–72 | (Montenegro) Budućnost VOLI | Belgrade |
| 19:00 | Scoring by quarter: 23–21, 23–29, 17–23, 23–9 |
| Arena Sport | Pts: Perperoglou 23; Rebs: Simanić 12; Asts: Ragland 6 PIR: Perperoglou 28 | Boxscore | Pts: Cole 21; Rebs: Clarke 8 Asts: three players 3 PIR: Cole 22 | Arena: Aleksandar Nikolić Hall; Attendance: 5,978; Referees: Sašo Petek, Josip Radojković, Milan Nedović |

| 4 January 2019 14 | Krka (Slovenia) | 66–96 | (Serbia) Crvena zvezda mts | Novo Mesto |
| 18:00 | Scoring by quarter: 13–22, 18–30, 23–17, 12–27 |
| Arena Sport | Pts: Balažič 13; Rebs: Marinelli, Balažič 4 Asts: Lapornik 7 PIR: Balažič 19 | Boxscore | Pts: Kešelj 20; Rebs: Čović 5 Asts: Ragland, Čović 8 PIR: Kešelj 22 | Arena: Leon Štukelj Hall; Attendance: 1,500; Referees: Josip Radojković, Branislav Mrdak, Dragan Porobić |

| 12 January 2019 15 | Igokea (Bosnia and Herzegovina) | 77–79 | (Serbia) Crvena zvezda mts | Laktaši |
| 17:00 | Scoring by quarter: 18–20, 25–21, 19–18, 15–20 |
| Arena Sport | Pts: Anđušić 15; Rebs: Milošević 9 Asts: Anđušić 5 PIR: Milošević 15 | Boxscore | Pts: Ragland 18; Rebs: Perperoglou 6 Asts: Ragland 7 PIR: Ragland, Ojo 18 | Arena: Laktaši Sports Hall; Attendance: 3,000; Referees: Uroš Obrknežević, Denis Hadžić, Radoš Arsenijević |

| 19 January 2019 16 | Crvena zvezda mts (Serbia) | 79–62 | (Serbia) FMP | Belgrade |
| 19:00 | Scoring by quarter: 18–9, 22–12, 16–23, 23–18 |
| Arena Sport | Pts: Dobrić 14; Rebs: Kešelj 6 Asts: Čović 5 PIR: Simanić 17 | Boxscore | Pts: Jeremić, Marzette 11; Rebs: Đorđević 7 Asts: Pot 4 PIR: Marzette 12 | Arena: Aleksandar Nikolić Hall; Attendance: 2,345; Referees: Sreten Radović, Dragan Kralj, Gordan Terlević |

| 26 January 2019 17 | Cedevita (Croatia) | 84–68 | (Serbia) Crvena zvezda mts | Zagreb |
| 17:00 | Scoring by quarter: 21–20, 28–13, 21–12, 14–23 |
| Arena Sport | Pts: Pullen 16; Rebs: Stipanović 8 Asts: Cobbs 4 PIR: Stipanović 17 | Boxscore | Pts: Dobrić 17; Rebs: Dobrić 6 Asts: Ragland 7 PIR: Dobrić 21 | Arena: Dom Sportova; Attendance: 2,800; Referees: Matej Boltauzer, Damir Javor, Matej Špendl |

| 2 February 2019 18 | Crvena zvezda mts (Serbia) | 89–61 | (Slovenia) Petrol Olimpija | Belgrade |
| 19:00 | Scoring by quarter: 24–19, 25–10, 17–18, 23–14 |
| Arena Sport | Pts: Dobrić 15; Rebs: Three players 6 Asts: Čović 12; PIR: Čović 23 | Boxscore | Pts: Lapornik 14; Rebs: Simonović 7 Asts: Špan 3 PIR: Simonović 11 | Arena: Aleksandar Nikolić Hall; Attendance: 3,000; Referees: Uroš Obrknežević, Dragan Porobić, Denis Hadžić |

| 9 February 2019 19 | Mornar (Montenegro) | 57–90 | (Serbia) Crvena zvezda mts | Bar |
| 19:00 | Scoring by quarter: 14–25, 12–25, 19–30, 12–10 |
| Arena Sport | Pts: Mićović 15; Rebs: Mićović 6 Asts: Knight, Vujošević 3 PIR: Mićović 16 | Boxscore | Pts: Baron 14; Rebs: Ojo 6 Asts: Ragland 7 PIR: Baron, Dobrić 17 | Arena: Topolica Sport Hall; Attendance: 3,000; Referees: Tomislav Hordov, Josip Radojković, Gordan Terlević |

| 3 March 2019 20 | Crvena zvezda mts (Serbia) | 70–68 | (Serbia) Partizan NIS | Belgrade |
| 18:00 | Scoring by quarter: 16–16, 16–18, 20–14, 18–20 |
| Arena Sport | Pts: Ragland 18; Rebs: Ojo 9 Asts: Ragland 5 PIR: Ojo 23 | Boxscore | Pts: Marinković, Landale 13; Rebs: Janković, Landale 6 Asts: Paige 4 PIR: Jaramaz 16 | Arena: Aleksandar Nikolić Hall; Attendance: 5,435; Referees: Miloš Koljenšić, Marko Juras, Uroš Nikolić |

| 9 March 2019 21 | Zadar (Croatia) | 69–87 | (Serbia) Crvena zvezda mts | Zadar |
| 17:00 | Scoring by quarter: 15–19, 16–18, 17–35, 21–15 |
| Arena Sport | Pts: Little 22; Rebs: Vuković 10; Asts: Bašić 4 PIR: Little 25 | Boxscore | Pts: Ragland 15; Rebs: Simanić 10; Asts: Ragland 5 PIR: Simanić 17 | Arena: Krešimir Ćosić Hall; Attendance: 5,500; Referees: Sašo Petek, Milija Vojinović, Matej Špendl |

| 16 March 2019 22 | Crvena zvezda mts (Serbia) | 100–76 | (Serbia) Mega Bemax | Belgrade |
| 19:00 | Scoring by quarter: 20–23, 37–10, 25–25, 18–18 |
| Arena Sport | Pts: Simanić, Ojo 14; Rebs: Ojo 9 Asts: Ragland 7 PIR: Simanić 26 | Boxscore | Pts: Mišković 15; Rebs: Nikolić 8 Asts: Atić, Cerovina 3 PIR: Nikolić 15 | Arena: Aleksandar Nikolić Hall; Attendance: 3,274; Referees: Milivoje Jovčić, Mario Majkić, Igor Dragojević |

==== Playoffs ====
| 23 March 2019 Semifinals 1 | Crvena zvezda mts (Serbia) | 106–101(OT) (Series: 1–0) | (Serbia) Partizan NIS | Belgrade |
| 19:00 | Scoring by quarter: 21–11, 15–24, 24–28, 25–22, Overtime: 21–16 |
| Arena Sport | Pts: Baron 23; Rebs: Davidovac 6 Asts: Čović 9 PIR: Davidovac 26 | Boxscore | Pts: Marinković 20; Rebs: Sy 6 Asts: Renfroe 8 PIR: Marinković 21 | Arena: Aleksandar Nikolić Hall; Attendance: 5,989; Referees: Ilija Belošević, Damir Javor, Tomislav Hordov |

| 30 March 2019 Semifinals 2 | Partizan NIS (Serbia) | 70–67 (Series: 1–1) | (Serbia) Crvena zvezda mts | Belgrade |
| 19:00 | Scoring by quarter: 13–9, 21–18, 14–22, 22–18 |
| Arena Sport | Pts: Marinković 18; Rebs: Landale; Asts: four players 3 PIR: Marinković 22 | Boxscore | Pts: Perperoglou 16; Rebs: Ojo 6 Asts: Čović 7 PIR: Perperoglou 12 | Arena: Aleksandar Nikolić Hall; Attendance: 6,500; Referees: Matej Boltauzer, Saša Pukl, Miloš Koljenšić |

| 6 April 2019 Semifinals 3 | Crvena zvezda mts (Serbia) | 84–63 (Series: 2–1) | (Serbia) Partizan NIS | Belgrade |
| 18:00 | Scoring by quarter: 21–13, 23–15, 20–13, 20–22 |
| Arena Sport | Pts: Perperoglou 18; Rebs: Ojo 8 Asts: Čović 6 PIR: Čović, Dobrić 13 | Boxscore | Pts: Marinković 12; Rebs: Paige, Veličković 6 Asts: Renfroe 8 PIR: N. Janković 15 | Arena: Aleksandar Nikolić Hall; Attendance: 6,858; Referees: Matej Boltauzer, Saša Pukl, Miloš Koljenšić |

| 12 April 2019 Finals 1 | Crvena zvezda mts (Serbia) | 91–72 (Series: 1–0) | (Montenegro) Budućnost VOLI | Belgrade |
| 19:00 | Scoring by quarter: 18–20, 27–22, 20–10, 26–20 |
| Arena Sport | Pts: Baron 19; Rebs: Zirbes, Ojo 6 Asts: Čović 6 PIR: Baron 27 | Boxscore | Pts: Cole 18; Rebs: Bitadze, Clarke 6 Asts: Cole, Gordić 4 PIR: Cole 16 | Arena: Aleksandar Nikolić Hall; Attendance: 6,374; Referees: Matej Boltauzer, Saša Pukl, Tomislav Hordov |

| 14 April 2019 Finals 2 | Crvena zvezda mts (Serbia) | 107–69 (Series: 2–0) | (Montenegro) Budućnost VOLI | Belgrade |
| 19:00 | Scoring by quarter: 26–19, 28–19, 22–16, 31–15 |
| Arena Sport | Pts: Perperoglou 17; Rebs: Faye 6 Asts: Čović 7 PIR: Rivers 20 | Boxscore | Pts: Gordić 11; Rebs: Jackson 7 Asts: Gordić 6 PIR: Gordić 18 | Arena: Aleksandar Nikolić Hall; Attendance: 6,397; Referees: Sreten Radović, Damir Javor, Miloš Koljenšić |

| 17 April 2019 Finals 3 | Budućnost VOLI (Montenegro) | 80–72 (Series: 1–2) | (Serbia) Crvena zvezda mts | Podgorica |
| 19:00 | Scoring by quarter: 18–25, 27–25, 21–8, 14–14 |
| Arena Sport | Pts: Cole 20; Rebs: Cole 7 Asts: Gordić 4 PIR: Cole 20 | Boxscore | Pts: Rivers 19; Rebs: Faye, Ojo 10; Asts: Čović 4 PIR: Faye 15 | Arena: Morača Sports Center; Attendance: 5,860; Referees: Tomislav Hordov, Mario Majkić, Marko Juras |

| 19 April 2019 Finals 4 | Budućnost VOLI (Montenegro) | 84–80 (Series: 2–2) | (Serbia) Crvena zvezda mts | Podgorica |
| 19:00 | Scoring by quarter: 20–25, 15–13, 22–20, 27–22 |
| Arena Sport | Pts: Cole 31; Rebs: Cole, Clark 6 Asts: Cole 6 PIR: Cole 36 | Boxscore | Pts: Baron 24; Rebs: Ojo 10; Asts: Faye 4 PIR: Baron 23 | Arena: Morača Sports Center; Attendance: 5,360; Referees: Damir Javor, Sašo Petek, Uroš Nikolić |

| 22 April 2019 Finals 5 | Crvena zvezda mts (Serbia) | 97–54 (Series: 3–2) | (Montenegro) Budućnost VOLI | Belgrade |
| 19:00 | Scoring by quarter: 18–13, 29–8, 27–16, 23–17 |
| Arena Sport | Pts: Rivers 21; Rebs: Ojo, Rivers 6 Asts: Čović 9 PIR: Rivers, Simanić 21 | Boxscore | Pts: Cole 9 Rebs: Clark 7 Asts: Cole 3 PIR: Cole, Gordić 10 | Arena: Aleksandar Nikolić Hall; Attendance: 6,500; Referees: Saša Pukl, Tomislav Hordov, Mario Majkić |

=== EuroCup ===
==== Regular season: Group A ====
| Pos | Team | Pld | W | L | PF | PA | PD | Qualification |
|---|---|---|---|---|---|---|---|---|
| 1 | (France) Monaco | 10 | 7 | 3 | 796 | 757 | +39 | Advance to Top 16 |
| 2 | (Spain) MoraBanc Andorra | 10 | 6 | 4 | 852 | 834 | +18 | Advance to Top 16 |
| 3 | (Serbia) Crvena zvezda mts | 10 | 6 | 4 | 825 | 768 | +57 | Advance to Top 16 |
| 4 | (Germany) ratiopharm Ulm | 10 | 5 | 5 | 824 | 827 | −3 | Advance to Top 16 |
| 5 | (Italy) Germani Brescia Leonessa | 10 | 3 | 7 | 780 | 842 | −62 | |
| 6 | (Turkey) Galatasaray | 10 | 3 | 7 | 761 | 810 | −49 | |

Source: EuroCup Basketball
Rules for classification: All points scored in extra period(s) were not counted in the standings, nor for any tie-break situation.

==== Regular season results by round ====
| Round | 1 | 2 | 3 | 4 | 5 | 6 | 7 | 8 | 9 | 10 |
|---|---|---|---|---|---|---|---|---|---|---|
| Ground | H | A | H | A | H | A | H | A | H | A |
| Result | W | W | W | L | W | L | L | L | W | W |
| Position | 1 | 1 | 1 | 2 | 1 | 1 | 2 | 3 | 3 | 3 |

Last updated: December 19, 2018.
Source: Competitive matches
Ground: A = Away; H = Home; R = Rest. Result: L = Loss; W = Win; R = Rest; P = Postponed.

Win Loss

==== Regular season matches ====
| 2 October 2018 1 | Crvena zvezda mts (Serbia) | 88–73 | (Germany) ratiopharm Ulm | Belgrade |
| 19:00 (CET) | Scoring by quarter: 28–21, 18–22, 16–16, 26–14 |
| Sport Klub | Pts: Baron 19; Rebs: Ojo 10; Asts: Ragland 6 PIR: Ojo 29 | Report | Pts: Fotu 16; Rebs: Evans 6 Asts: Miller, Green 4 PIR: Fotu 19 | Arena: Aleksandar Nikolić Hall; Attendance: 4,876; Referees: Carmelo Paternico (ITA), Petros Papapetrou (GRE), Mykola Ambrosov (UKR) |

| 10 October 2018 2 | Monaco (France) | 63–66 | (Serbia) Crvena zvezda mts | Fontvieille |
| 19:45 (CET) | Scoring by quarter: 6–17, 18–12, 20–8, 19–29 |
| Sport Klub | Pts: Kikanović 22; Rebs: Hummer 12; Asts: Jones 7 PIR: Kikanović 21 | Report | Pts: Ragland, Perperoglou 13; Rebs: Ojo 7 Asts: Čović 3 PIR: Ojo, Perperoglou 13 | Arena: Salle Gaston Médecin; Attendance: 0 Referees: Carlos Peruga (ESP), Ersan Kartal (TUR), Eduard Udyanskyy (UKR) |

| 17 October 2018 3 | Crvena zvezda mts (Serbia) | 85–79 | (Spain) MoraBanc Andorra | Belgrade |
| 19:00 (CET) | Scoring by quarter: 16–17, 28–17, 16–25, 25–21 |
| Sport Klub | Pts: Ragland 24; Rebs: Faye 11; Asts: Ragland 8 PIR: Faye 28 | Report | Pts: Jelínek 18; Rebs: Ennis 5 Asts: Albicy 12; PIR: Albicy 26 | Arena: Aleksandar Nikolić Hall; Attendance: 4,987; Referees: Jakub Zamojski (POL), Aare Halliko (EST), Semen Ovinov (RUS) |

| 24 October 2018 4 | Germani Brescia Leonessa (Italy) | 69–61 | (Serbia) Crvena zvezda mts | Brescia |
| 20:30 (CET) | Scoring by quarter: 15–31, 24–7, 17–12, 13–11 |
| Sport Klub | Pts: Beverly 15; Rebs: Zerini 8 Asts: Moss 5 PIR: Beverly, Moss 15 | Report | Pts: Baron 22; Rebs: Zirbes 8 Asts: Ragland 7 PIR: Ragland 17 | Arena: PalaLeonessa; Attendance: 2,150; Referees: Piotr Pastusiak (POL), Moritz Reiter (GER), Arturas Sukys (LTU) |

| 30 October 2018 5 | Crvena zvezda mts (Serbia) | 87–57 | (Turkey) Galatasaray Odeabank | Belgrade |
| 19:00 (CET) | Scoring by quarter: 26–13, 18–13, 25–21, 18–10 |
| Sport Klub | Pts: Ragland 21; Rebs: Baron 7 Asts: Baron 5 PIR: Baron 26 | Report | Pts: Webster 16; Rebs: Auguste 9 Asts: four players 2 PIR: Auguste 19 | Arena: Aleksandar Nikolić Hall; Attendance: 5,896; Referees: Benjamin Jimenez (SPA), Spiros Gkontas (GRE), Gytis Vilius (LTU) |

| 7 November 2018 6 | ratiopharm Ulm (Germany) | 95–80 | (Serbia) Crvena zvezda mts | Ulm |
| 19:30 (CET) | Scoring by quarter: 21–17, 29–16, 23–24, 22–23 |
| Sport Klub | Pts: Evans 23; Rebs: Evans 11; Asts: Akpınar, Fotu 3 PIR: Evans 31 | Report | Pts: Dobrić 21; Rebs: Faye 11; Asts: Ragland 7 PIR: Dobrić 26 | Arena: Ratiopharm Arena; Attendance: 5,200; Referees: Fernando Rocha (POR), Amit Balak (ISR), Jordi Aliaga Solé (SPA) |

| 14 November 2018 7 | Crvena zvezda mts (Serbia) | 75–91 | (France) Monaco | Belgrade |
| 19:00 (CET) | Scoring by quarter: 29–29, 16–15, 17–23, 13–15 |
| | Pts: Baron 14; Rebs: Faye 8 Asts: Ragland 8 PIR: Baron 13 | Report | Pts: Needham 21; Rebs: Lacombe 6 Asts: Needham, Lacombe 6 PIR: Needham 25 | Arena: Aleksandar Nikolić Hall; Attendance: 4,952; Referees: Daniel Hierrezuelo Navas (ESP), Ersan Kartal (TUR), Mykola Ambrosov (UKR) |

| 20 November 2018 8 | MoraBanc Andorra (Spain) | 91–80 | (Serbia) Crvena zvezda mts | Andorra la Vella |
| 20:00 (CET) | Scoring by quarter: 25–20, 21–27, 25–15, 20–18 |
| | Pts: Albicy 19; Rebs: Stević 7 Asts: Luz 5 PIR: Albicy 22 | Report | Pts: Ragland 20; Rebs: Faye 9 Asts: Ragland, Baron 3 PIR: Ragland, Zirbes 17 | Arena: Poliesportiu d'Andorra; Attendance: 2,530; Referees: Christos Christodoulou (GRE), Ingus Baumanis (LAT), Hugues Thepenier (FRA) |

| 12 December 2018 9 | Crvena zvezda mts (Serbia) | 103–67 | (Italy) Germani Brescia Leonessa | Belgrade |
| 19:00 (CET) | Scoring by quarter: 31–14, 34–8, 17–21, 21–24 |
| | Pts: Ragland 16; Rebs: Ristić, Simanić 6 Asts: Ragland 10; PIR: Ragland 27 | Report | Pts: Allen 17; Rebs: Laquintana 5 Asts: Allen 3 PIR: Laquintana 14 | Arena: Aleksandar Nikolić Hall; Attendance: 4,682; Referees: Spiros Gkontas (GRE), Jurgis Laurinavicius (LIT), Tomasz Trawicki (POL) |

| 19 December 2018 10 | Galatasaray Odeabank (Turkey) | 83–100 | (Serbia) Crvena zvezda mts | Istanbul |
| 20:00 (FET) | Scoring by quarter: 26–24, 16–25, 26–30, 15–21 |
| | Pts: Hayes 30; Rebs: Three players 4 Asts: Webster 7 PIR: Hayes 31 | Report | Pts: Baron 20; Rebs: Ojo 7 Asts: Ragland 12; PIR: Ragland 31 | Arena: Sinan Erdem Dome; Attendance: 1,146; Referees: Anne Panther (GER), Aare Halliko (EST), Michele Rossi (ITA) |

==== Top 16: Group G ====
| Pos | Team | Pld | W | L | PF | PA | PD | Qualification |
|---|---|---|---|---|---|---|---|---|
| 1 | (Spain) Valencia Basket | 6 | 6 | 0 | 501 | 458 | +43 | Advance to quarterfinals |
| 2 | (Spain) Unicaja | 6 | 3 | 3 | 468 | 485 | −17 | Advance to quarterfinals |
| 3 | (Serbia) Crvena zvezda mts | 6 | 2 | 4 | 490 | 485 | +5 | |
| 4 | (France) Limoges CSP | 6 | 1 | 5 | 450 | 481 | −31 | |

Source: EuroCup Basketball
Rules for classification: All points scored in extra period(s) were not counted in the standings, nor for any tie-break situation.

==== Top 16 results by round ====
| Round | 1 | 2 | 3 | 4 | 5 | 6 |
|---|---|---|---|---|---|---|
| Ground | H | A | A | H | A | H |
| Result | W | L | L | L | L | W |
| Position | 1 | 3 | 3 | 3 | 3 | 3 |

Last updated: February 5, 2019.
Source: Competitive matches
Ground: A = Away; H = Home; R = Rest. Result: L = Loss; W = Win; R = Rest; P = Postponed.

Win Loss

==== Top 16 matches ====
| 2 January 2019 1 | Crvena zvezda mts (Serbia) | 83–71 | (France) Limoges | Belgrade |
| 20:00 | Scoring by quarter: 25–16, 15–16, 18–21, 25–18 |
| Sport Klub | Pts: Baron 13; Rebs: Perperoglou 8 Asts: Čović, Davidovac 6 PIR: Baron 22 | Report | Pts: Hardy 20; Rebs: Boutsiele 8 Asts: Taylor 7 PIR: Hardy 20 | Arena: Aleksandar Nikolić Hall; Attendance: 5,897; Referees: Carlos Peruga (SPA), Petros Papapetrou (GRE), Robert Vyklicky (CZE) |

| 8 January 2019 2 | Unicaja (Spain) | 79–74 | (Serbia) Crvena zvezda mts | Málaga |
| 19:45 | Scoring by quarter: 26–13, 25–24, 14–18, 14–19 |
| Sport Klub; Teledeporte | Pts: Lessort 16; Rebs: Shermadini 9 Asts: Roberts, Fernández 4 PIR: Lessort 25 | Report | Pts: Perperoglou 23; Rebs: Ristić 8 Asts: Ragland 7 PIR: Perperoglou 20 | Arena: Palacio de Deportes José María Martín Carpena; Attendance: 5,032; Referees: Christos Christodoulou (GRE), Clemens Fritz (GER), Gytis Vilius (LIT) |

| 16 January 2019 3 | Valencia Basket (Spain) | 92–76 | (Serbia) Crvena zvezda mts | Valencia |
| 20:45 | Scoring by quarter: 21–23, 21–14, 25–20, 25–19 |
| Sport Klub | Pts: Dubljević 14; Rebs: Dubljević 8 Asts: Diot 5 PIR: Thomas 21 | Report | Pts: Ragland 21; Rebs: Ojo 6 Asts: Four players 3 PIR: Ragland 23 | Arena: Pabellón Fuente de San Luis; Attendance: 6,312; Referees: Petri Mantyla (FIN), Jurgis Laurinavicius (LIT), Tomasz Trawicki (POL) |

| 23 January 2019 4 | Crvena zvezda mts (Serbia) | 81–82 | (Spain) Valencia Basket | Belgrade |
| 19:00 | Scoring by quarter: 17–21, 27–21, 14–22, 23–18 |
| Sport Klub; Teledeporte | Pts: Perperoglou 26; Rebs: Faye 10; Asts: Three players 3 PIR: Perperoglou 22 | Report | Pts: Dubljević 24; Rebs: Dubljević 8 Asts: Van Rossom 6 PIR: Dubljević 29 | Arena: Aleksandar Nikolić Hall; Attendance: 5,898; Referees: Emin Mogulkoc (TUR), Sergio Silva (POR), Hugues Thepenier (FRA) |

| 29 January 2019 5 | Limoges (France) | 72–71 | (Serbia) Crvena zvezda mts | Limoges |
| 20:00 | Scoring by quarter: 15–16, 25–19, 8–25, 24–11 |
| Sport Klub | Pts: Miles, Boutsiele 13; Rebs: Boutsiele 13; Asts: Taylor 7 PIR: Boutsiele 24 | Report | Pts: Ragland 15; Rebs: Ojo, Ristić 6 Asts: Ragland 6 PIR: Ragland 25 | Arena: Beaublanc; Attendance: 4,200; Referees: Petros Papapetrou (GRE), Jordi Aliaga (ESP), Ersan Kartal (TUR) |

| 5 February 2019 6 | Crvena zvezda mts (Serbia) | 105–89 | (Spain) Unicaja | Belgrade |
| 19:00 | Scoring by quarter: 26–27, 31–14, 24–24, 24–24 |
| Sport Klub | Pts: Ragland 17; Rebs: Simanić 7 Asts: Ragland 7 PIR: Ragland 21 | Report | Pts: Wiltjer 18; Rebs: Milosavljević, Shermadini 4 Asts: Boatright, Roberts 3 PIR: Fernández 17 | Arena: Aleksandar Nikolić Hall; Attendance: 2,896; Referees: Fernando Rocha (POR), Seffi Shemmesh (ISR), Robert Vyklicky (CZE) |

=== Serbian Super League ===
The 2018–19 Basketball League of Serbia was the 13th season of the Serbian highest professional basketball league and the Super League, as the second part of the season, and was held from April 27 to June 17, 2019.

==== Regular season ====
| Pos | Team | Pld | W | L | PF | PA | PD | Pts | Qualification |
|---|---|---|---|---|---|---|---|---|---|
| 1 | Crvena zvezda mts | 10 | 10 | 0 | 854 | 630 | +224 | 20 | Qualification to the Playoffs |
| 2 | FMP | 10 | 8 | 2 | 824 | 688 | +136 | 18 | Qualification to the Playoffs |
| 3 | Borac | 10 | 6 | 4 | 776 | 799 | −23 | 16 | |
| 4 | Zlatibor | 10 | 3 | 7 | 728 | 803 | −75 | 13 | |
| 5 | OKK Beograd | 10 | 2 | 8 | 807 | 884 | −77 | 12 | |
| 6 | Dunav | 10 | 1 | 9 | 723 | 908 | −185 | 11 | |

Source: Basketball League of Serbia

==== Results by round ====
| Round | 1 | 2 | 3 | 4 | 5 | 6 | 7 | 8 | 9 | 10 |
|---|---|---|---|---|---|---|---|---|---|---|
| Ground | H | A | H | H | A | A | H | A | A | H |
| Result | W | W | W | W | W | W | W | W | W | W |
| Position | 1 | 1 | 1 | 1 | 1 | 1 | 1 | 1 | 1 | 1 |

Last updated: May 29, 2019.
Source: Competitive matches
Ground: A = Away; H = Home; R = Rest. Result: L = Loss; W = Win; R = Rest; P = Postponed.

Win Loss

==== Matches ====
| 27 April 2019 1 | Crvena zvezda mts | 101–60 | Dunav | Belgrade |
| 18:00 | Scoring by quarter: 26–15, 33–16, 23–20, 19–9 |
| Arena Sport | Pts: Ristić 18; Rebs: Ristić 8 Asts: Čović 7 PIR: Ristić 32 | Boxscore | Pts: Nikolić 11; Rebs: Nikolić 10; Asts: Simić 4 PIR: Nikolić 19 | Arena: Aleksandar Nikolić Hall; Attendance: 2,367; Referees: Saša Maričić, Jasmina Juras, Duško Sedlar |

| 1 May 2019 2 | Zlatibor | 68–82 | Crvena zvezda mts | Čajetina |
| 19:00 | Scoring by quarter: 16–23, 26–27, 15–20, 11–12 |
| | Pts: Bjelica 13; Rebs: four players 3 Asts: Vorkapić, Nikolić 4 PIR: Pavlović 11 | Boxscore | Pts: Davidovac 22; Rebs: Ristić, Ojo 9 Asts: Čović 3 PIR: Davidovac 26 | Arena: WAI TAI - STC Zlatibor; Attendance: 1,100; Referees: Ilija Belošević, Vladimir Jevtović, Stefan Ćalić |

| 4 May 2019 3 | Crvena zvezda mts | 82–65 | FMP | Belgrade |
| 21:00 | Scoring by quarter: 21–14, 28–13, 13–25, 20–13 |
| Arena Sport | Pts: Ristić 16; Rebs: Ristić 10; Asts: Čović 16; PIR: Ristić 20 | Boxscore | Pts: Delany 18; Rebs: Šešlija 7 Asts: Uskoković 7 PIR: Delany 20 | Arena: Aleksandar Nikolić Hall; Attendance: 1,829; Referees: Saša Maričić, Vladimir Jevtović, Nemanja Ninković |

| 8 May 2019 4 | Crvena zvezda mts | 82–50 | OKK Beograd | Belgrade |
| 19:00 | Scoring by quarter: 19–16, 23–13, 25–14, 15–7 |
| Arena Sport | Pts: Ristić 15; Rebs: Ristić 7 Asts: Čović 12; PIR: Dobrić 21 | Boxscore | Pts: Cerovina 15; Rebs: Langović 8 Asts: Musić 6 PIR: Tanasković 12 | Arena: Aleksandar Nikolić Hall; Attendance: TBA; Referees: Milivoje Jovčić, Siniša Prpa, Vladimir Vesković |

| 11 May 2019 5 | Borac | 67–77 | Crvena zvezda mts | Čačak |
| 20:00 | Scoring by quarter: 23–17, 18–21, 15–22, 11–17 |
| Arena Sport | Pts: I. Đoković 22; Rebs: Majstorović 6 Asts: R. Đoković 5 PIR: I. Đoković 19 | Boxscore | Pts: Lazić, Rivers 18; Rebs: Faye 10; Asts: Čović 8 PIR: Lazić 17 | Arena: Borac Hall; Attendance: 2,500; Referees: Milija Vojinović, Aleksandar Glišić, Ivan Stefanović |

| 15 May 2019 6 | Dunav | 65–91 | Crvena zvezda mts | Stari Banovci |
| 20:00 | Scoring by quarter: 19–22, 13–23, 16–22, 17–24 |
| Arena Sport | Pts: Ivić 11; Rebs: Kovačević 7 Asts: Šućov; PIR: Grušanović 11 | Boxscore | Pts: Davidovac 19; Rebs: Ojo 10; Asts: Čović 5 PIR: Ojo 29 | Arena: Park Hall; Attendance: 1,036; Referees: Marko Juras, Vladimir Vesković, Jasmina Juras |

| 18 May 2019 7 | Crvena zvezda mts | 83–57 | Zlatibor | Belgrade |
| 17:00 | Scoring by quarter: 25–16, 19–19, 26–12, 13–10 |
| Arena Sport | Pts: Čović 16; Rebs: Rivers 6 Asts: three players 4 PIR: Čović 21 | Boxscore | Pts: Babović 15; Rebs: Marojević 7 Asts: Vorkapić 8 PIR: Babović 17 | Arena: Železnik Hall; Attendance: 367; Referees: Ilija Belošević, Branislav Mrdak, Jasmina Juras |

| 22 May 2019 8 | FMP | 62–77 | Crvena zvezda mts | Belgrade |
| 20:00 | Scoring by quarter: 14–16, 20–19, 16–21, 12–21 |
| Arena Sport | Pts: Đorđević 16; Rebs: Đorđević 6 Asts: Pot 5 PIR: Đorđević 15 | Boxscore | Pts: Dobrić 19; Rebs: Ristić 8 Asts: Three players 4 PIR: Dobrić 21 | Arena: Železnik Hall; Attendance: 580; Referees: Uroš Nikolić, Ivan Stefanović, Radoš Arsenijević |

| 25 May 2019 9 | OKK Beograd | 78–93 | Crvena zvezda mts | Belgrade |
| 17:00 | Scoring by quarter: 17–27, 20–24, 18–25, 23–17 |
| Arena Sport | Pts: Simeunović 24; Rebs: Stanić 6 Asts: Simeunović 6 PIR: Simeunović 32 | Boxscore | Pts: Ojo 14; Rebs: Faye 6 Asts: Nenadić 8 PIR: Ojo 21 | Arena: Mega Factory; Attendance: 300; Referees: Uroš Obrknežević, Branislav Mrdak, Duško Sedlar |

| 29 May 2019 10 | Crvena zvezda mts | 86–58 | Borac | Belgrade |
| 18:00 | Scoring by quarter: 20–20, 17–17, 21–11, 28–10 |
| Arena Sport | Pts: Ristić 16; Rebs: Ristić 9 Asts: Čović 5 PIR: Ristić 27 | Boxscore | Pts: Kočović 15; Rebs: Miletić 8 Asts: Kočović 4 PIR: Kočović 15 | Arena: Aleksandar Nikolić Hall; Attendance: 1,406; Referees: Srđan Janković, Srđan Janković, Branko Lazić |

==== Playoffs ====
| 2 June 2019 Semifinals 1 | Crvena zvezda mts | 83–72 (Series: 1–0) | Mega Bemax | Belgrade |
| 19:00 | Scoring by quarter: 12–17, 26–23, 20–17, 25–17 |
| Arena Sport | Pts: Baron 24; Rebs: Faye 9 Asts: three players 3 PIR: Čović 18 | Boxscore | Pts: Ašćerić 20; Rebs: Bitadze 8 Asts: Bitadze, Atić 6 PIR: Atić 18 | Arena: Aleksandar Nikolić Hall; Attendance: 1,976; Referees: Milija Vojinović, Aleksandar Glišić, Saša Maričić |

| 4 June 2019 Semifinals 2 | Mega Bemax | 91–96 (Series: 0–2) | Crvena zvezda mts | Belgrade |
| 19:00 | Scoring by quarter: 25–24, 25–25, 22–24, 19–23 |
| Arena Sport | Pts: Ašćerić 20; Rebs: Fundić, Atić 7 Asts: Atić 9 PIR: Atić 27 | Boxscore | Pts: Rivers 29; Rebs: Ojo 6 Asts: Čović 4 PIR: Rivers 24 | Arena: Mega Factory; Attendance: 500; Referees: Ilija Belošević, Uroš Obrknežević, Siniša Prpa |

| 10 June 2019 Finals 1 | Crvena zvezda mts | 98–94 (Series: 1–0) | Partizan NIS | Belgrade |
| 18:00 | Scoring by quarter: 30–22, 18–18, 25–28, 25–26 |
| Arena Sport | Pts: Davidovac 20; Rebs: Ojo 8 Asts: Čović 5 PIR: Čović 28 | Boxscore | Pts: Renfroe 20; Rebs: N. Janković 7 Asts: Jaramaz, Renfroe 4 PIR: Renfroe 24 | Arena: Aleksandar Nikolić Hall; Attendance: 5,231; Referees: Milivoje Jovčić, Aleksandar Glišić, Vladimir Jevtović |

| 12 June 2019 Finals 2 | Partizan NIS | 73–72 (Series: 1–1) | Crvena zvezda mts | Belgrade |
| 19:00 | Scoring by quarter: 17–9, 19–20, 13–24, 24–19 |
| Arena Sport | Pts: Paige 19; Rebs: N. Janković 10; Asts: Renfroe 3 PIR: N. Janković 19 | Boxscore | Pts: Faye 14; Rebs: Ojo 7 Asts: Baron 7 PIR: Faye 18 | Arena: Aleksandar Nikolić Hall; Attendance: 6,500; Referees: Ilija Belošević, Marko Juras, Uroš Obrknežević |

| 15 June 2019 Finals 3 | Crvena zvezda mts | 96–90 (Series: 2–1) | Partizan NIS | Belgrade |
| 18:00 | Scoring by quarter: 22–18, 26–27, 20–19, 28–26 |
| Arena Sport | Pts: Baron 25; Rebs: Faye 9 Asts: Čović 8 PIR: Baron 28 | Boxscore | Pts: Marinković 21; Rebs: Renfroe 6 Asts: Renfroe 8 PIR: Renfroe 35 | Arena: Aleksandar Nikolić Hall; Attendance: 5,634; Referees: Milivoje Jovčić, Marko Juras, Uroš Nikolić |

| 17 June 2019 Finals 4 | Partizan NIS | 75–76 (Series: 1–3) | Crvena zvezda mts | Belgrade |
| 18:00 | Scoring by quarter: 23–16, 19–18, 10–18, 23–24 |
| Arena Sport | Pts: Gagić, Renfroe 11; Rebs: Veličković 7 Asts: Renfroe 4 PIR: Jaramaz 13 | Boxscore | Pts: Baron 21; Rebs: Ojo 7 Asts: Čović 7 PIR: Baron 19 | Arena: Aleksandar Nikolić Hall; Attendance: 6,500; Referees: Ilija Belošević, Uroš Obrknežević, Uroš Nikolić |

=== Radivoj Korać Cup ===
The 2019 Radivoj Korać Cup was 13th season of the Serbian cup tournament and was held within February 2019.

Win Loss

| 15 February 2019 Quarterfinals | Crvena zvezda mts | 75–70 | Dynamic VIP PAY | Niš |
| 19:30 | Scoring by quarter: 13–19, 17–20, 18–19, 27–12 |
| Arena Sport | Pts: Baron 21; Rebs: Zirbes 7 Asts: Ragland 8 PIR: Baron 27 | Boxscore | Pts: Glišić 23; Rebs: Glišić 9 Asts: Rakićević 6 PIR: Glišić 29 | Arena: Čair Sports Center; Attendance: 3,000; Referees: Aleksandar Glišić, Siniša Prpa, Radoš Arsenijević |

| 16 February 2019 Semifinals | Crvena zvezda mts | 92–73 | Mega Bemax | Niš |
| 21:00 | Scoring by quarter: 12–16, 30–21, 18–24, 32–12 |
| Arena Sport | Pts: Baron 20; Rebs: Ristić 8 Asts: Ragland 9 PIR: Perperoglou 19 | Boxscore | Pts: Atić 20; Rebs: Stanić 9 Asts: Ratkovica 10; PIR: Stanić 24 | Arena: Čair Sports Center; Attendance: 3,000; Referees: Milivoje Jovčić, Milija Vojinović, Marko Juras |

| 17 February 2019 Final | Partizan NIS | 76–74 | Crvena zvezda mts | Niš |
| 17:00 | Scoring by quarter: 19–18, 18–15, 18–24, 21–17 |
| Arena Sport | Pts: Renfroe, Landale 18; Rebs: Renfroe 7 Asts: Renfroe 10; PIR: Renfroe 26 | Boxscore | Pts: Baron 18; Rebs: Perperoglou, Ristić 5 Asts: Ragland 9 PIR: Ragland 20 | Arena: Čair Sports Center; Attendance: 4,500; Referees: Ilija Belošević, Milivoje Jovčić, Uroš Obrknežević |

=== Adriatic Supercup ===
Win Loss

| 21 September 2018 Quarterfinals | Crvena zvezda mts (Serbia) | 86–60 | (Slovenia) Petrol Olimpija | Laktaši |
| 20:30 | Scoring by quarter: 20–28, 20–14, 20–9, 26–9 |
| Arena Sport | Pts: Zirbes 14; Rebs: Faye 9 Asts: Ragland, Radanov 5 PIR: Zirbes 20 | Boxscore | Pts: Mesiček 15; Rebs: Begić 5 Asts: Mesiček 4 PIR: Lazić 17 | Arena: Laktaši Sports Hall; Attendance: 1,500; Referees: Miloš Koljenšić, Igor Dragojević, Saša Babić |

| 22 September 2018 Semifinals | Cedevita (Croatia) | 68–79 | (Serbia) Crvena zvezda mts | Laktaši |
| 20:30 | Scoring by quarter: 16–25, 11–20, 17–11, 24–23 |
| Arena Sport | Pts: four players 10; Rebs: Aguilar 7 Asts: Magette 5 PIR: Aguilar 14 | Boxscore | Pts: Ragland 20; Rebs: Faye 7 Asts: Čović 4 PIR: Faye 22 | Arena: Laktaši Sports Hall; Attendance: 2,200; Referees: Miloš Koljenšić, Mario Majkić, Saša Babić |

| 23 September 2018 Final | Budućnost VOLI (Montenegro) | 75–89 | (Serbia) Crvena zvezda mts | Laktaši |
| 21:00 | Scoring by quarter: 16–28, 16–29, 23–21, 20–11 |
| Arena Sport | Pts: Barović 19; Rebs: Clarke 6 Asts: Jackson 5 PIR: Barović 23 | Boxscore | Pts: Faye 14; Rebs: Zirbes, Lazić 5 Asts: Ragland 7 PIR: Zirbes 16 | Arena: Laktaši Sports Hall; Attendance: 2,500; Referees: Saša Pukl, Tomislav Hordov, Mario Majkić |

== Individual awards ==
=== Adriatic League ===
MVP of the Round

| Round | Player | Eff. | Ref. |
|---|---|---|---|
| SF1 | (Serbia) Dejan Davidovac | 26 | |
| F1 | (United States) Billy Baron | 27 | |
| F2 | (United States) K. C. Rivers | 20 | |
| F5 | (United States) K. C. Rivers | 21 | |

Ideal Starting Five

| Position | Player | Ref. |
|---|---|---|
| PG | (United States) Joe Ragland | |
| SF | (Greece) Stratos Perperoglou | |

Finals MVP

| Position | Player | Ref. |
|---|---|---|
| SG | (United States) Billy Baron | |

Super Cup MVP

| Position | Player | Ref. |
|---|---|---|
| PF | (Senegal) Mouhammad Faye | |

=== Serbian League ===
Finals MVP

| Position | Player | Ref. |
|---|---|---|
| SG | (United States) Billy Baron | |

== Statistics ==
Legend
| GP | Games played | GS | Games started | MPG | Minutes per game |
| FG% | Field-goal percentage | 3FG% | 3-point field-goal percentage | FT% | Free-throw percentage |
| RPG | Rebounds per game | APG | Assists per game | SPG | Steals per game |
| BPG | Blocks per game | PPG | Points per game | PIR | PIR per game |

| Player | Left during season |

=== Adriatic League ===
| Player | GP | GS | MPG | 2FG% | 3FG% | FT% | RPG | APG | SPG | BPG | PPG | PIR |
|---|---|---|---|---|---|---|---|---|---|---|---|---|
| Billy Baron | 29 | 29 | 21.5 | .607 | .418 | .847 | 2.3 | 2.7 | 1.0 | 0.0 | 11.6 | 12.0 |
| Filip Čović | 25 | 1 | 17.7 | .436 | .322 | .769 | 1.3 | 5.0 | 0.4 | 0.0 | 5.8 | 8.0 |
| Dejan Davidovac | 22 | 7 | 16.4 | .578 | .294 | .725 | 3.5 | 1.8 | 0.9 | 0.5 | 5.7 | 8.8 |
| Ognjen Dobrić | 24 | 4 | 16.3 | .787 | .416 | .741 | 2.4 | 0.6 | 0.6 | 0.2 | 8.8 | 8.5 |
| Mouhammad Faye | 27 | 20 | 20.4 | .722 | .333 | .787 | 5.1 | 1.3 | 0.6 | 0.9 | 6.8 | 10.4 |
| Marko Kešelj | 11 | 1 | 9.7 | .333 | .556 | .600 | 1.6 | 0.4 | 0.3 | 0.0 | 5.1 | 4.3 |
| Branko Lazić | 25 | 23 | 14.2 | .480 | .378 | .786 | 1.4 | 0.4 | 0.6 | 0.0 | 3.9 | 2.9 |
| Nemanja Nenadić | 17 | 0 | 9.8 | .316 | .273 | .588 | 1.4 | 1.1 | 0.2 | 0.0 | 3.6 | 2.1 |
| Michael Ojo | 30 | 14 | 19.1 | .651 | .000 | .657 | 6.4 | 0.3 | 0.4 | 0.8 | 8.5 | 12.8 |
| Stratos Perperoglou | 23 | 2 | 19.5 | .559 | .366 | .577 | 2.8 | 1.8 | 0.9 | 0.1 | 10.9 | 10.2 |
| Aleksa Radanov | 7 | 0 | 8.6 | 1.000 | 1.000 | .667 | 1.0 | 0.4 | 0.7 | 0.0 | 3.6 | 3.4 |
| Joe Ragland | 22 | 22 | 22.3 | .607 | .314 | .846 | 2.1 | 5.7 | 1.1 | 0.0 | 10.7 | 13.4 |
| Dušan Ristić | 16 | 1 | 8.3 | .534 | 1.000 | .680 | 2.4 | 0.4 | 0.1 | 0.2 | 5.1 | 5.8 |
| K. C. Rivers | 11 | 1 | 19.3 | .457 | .360 | .652 | 2.5 | 1.8 | 0.5 | 0.3 | 10.1 | 6.7 |
| Boriša Simanić | 27 | 10 | 18.8 | .607 | .451 | .923 | 3.6 | 1.0 | 0.7 | 1.0 | 7.0 | 9.5 |
| Maik Zirbes | 28 | 15 | 15.6 | .625 | .000 | .731 | 3.8 | 0.6 | 0.5 | 0.5 | 7.8 | 8.7 |
| Stefan Janković | Did not play (Suspension) | | | | | | | | | | | |

Last updated: April 22, 2019.
Source: Adriatic League

=== EuroCup ===
| Player | GP | GS | MPG | 2FG% | 3FG% | FT% | RPG | APG | SPG | BPG | PPG | PIR |
|---|---|---|---|---|---|---|---|---|---|---|---|---|
| Billy Baron | 16 | 16 | 26:58 | .510 | .494 | .816 | 2.6 | 2.8 | 0.5 | 0.0 | 12.9 | 13.2 |
| Filip Čović | 13 | 0 | 13:38 | .545 | .325 | .826 | 0.8 | 2.6 | 0.3 | 0.0 | 6.3 | 6.1 |
| Dejan Davidovac | 8 | 0 | 10:53 | .692 | .222 | .538 | 0.9 | 1.5 | 0.0 | 0.0 | 3.9 | 3.6 |
| Ognjen Dobrić | 12 | 4 | 18:50 | .475 | .371 | .625 | 2.3 | 0.7 | 0.8 | 0.3 | 6.8 | 6.0 |
| Mouhammad Faye | 13 | 9 | 24:58 | .529 | .354 | .792 | 6.9 | 1.6 | 0.8 | 0.7 | 8.2 | 12.5 |
| Marko Kešelj | 4 | 0 | 12:22 | 1.000 | .375 | 1.000 | 1.0 | 0.3 | 0.3 | 0.3 | 4.5 | 4.0 |
| Branko Lazić | 12 | 12 | 16:39 | .533 | .350 | .500 | 1.8 | 0.8 | 0.4 | 0.1 | 3.2 | 1.8 |
| Nemanja Nenadić | 5 | 0 | 9:31 | .500 | .800 | .500 | 1.4 | 1.8 | 0.6 | 0.0 | 5.0 | 5.6 |
| Michael Ojo | 16 | 2 | 15:09 | .707 | .000 | .647 | 4.5 | 0.4 | 0.5 | 0.9 | 6.5 | 10.4 |
| Stratos Perperoglou | 16 | 0 | 23:10 | .458 | .414 | .706 | 2.8 | 1.6 | 0.8 | 0.3 | 10.8 | 9.6 |
| Aleksa Radanov | 8 | 0 | 6:13 | .375 | .750 | .571 | 0.5 | 0.6 | 0.1 | 0.0 | 2.4 | 1.8 |
| Joe Ragland | 16 | 16 | 26:54 | .643 | .354 | .759 | 1.9 | 6.0 | 1.3 | 0.0 | 14.8 | 16.8 |
| Dušan Ristić | 13 | 1 | 8:05 | .464 | .000 | 1.000 | 2.8 | 0.1 | 0.2 | 0.2 | 2.4 | 3.3 |
| Boriša Simanić | 15 | 7 | 12:34 | .633 | .355 | .750 | 2.5 | 0.7 | 0.6 | 0.8 | 4.9 | 5.9 |
| Maik Zirbes | 14 | 13 | 19:12 | .661 | .000 | .375 | 3.6 | 0.8 | 0.5 | 0.4 | 6.5 | 6.7 |
| Stefan Janković | Did not play (Suspension) | | | | | | | | | | | |

Last updated: February 5, 2019.
Source: 7Days EuroCup

=== Serbian Super League ===
| Player | GP | GS | MPG | 2FG% | 3FG% | FT% | RPG | APG | SPG | BPG | PPG | PIR |
|---|---|---|---|---|---|---|---|---|---|---|---|---|
| Billy Baron | 14 | 13 | 20:17 | .538 | .452 | .900 | 2.1 | 2.9 | 0.4 | 0.1 | 10.9 | 11.3 |
| Filip Čović | 15 | 0 | 20:57 | .415 | .319 | .840 | 1.9 | 6.1 | 0.9 | 0.1 | 8.1 | 11.9 |
| Dejan Davidovac | 16 | 16 | 20:55 | .500 | .403 | .694 | 3.0 | 2.2 | 1.1 | 0.4 | 9.5 | 11.4 |
| Ognjen Dobrić | 15 | 1 | 19:25 | .707 | .319 | .750 | 2.4 | 0.6 | 0.6 | 0.2 | 9.9 | 9.7 |
| Mouhammad Faye | 15 | 14 | 20:06 | .700 | .359 | .659 | 5.1 | 1.7 | 0.9 | 1.1 | 6.5 | 9.7 |
| Marko Kešelj | 8 | 0 | 9:01 | .600 | .250 | 1.000 | 1.3 | 0.4 | 0.3 | 0.0 | 3.5 | 1.8 |
| Branko Lazić | 15 | 15 | 17:58 | .652 | .370 | .867 | 0.9 | 0.9 | 0.9 | 0.1 | 6.3 | 4.6 |
| Nemanja Nenadić | 8 | 0 | 13:37 | .654 | .235 | .100 | 2.9 | 2.4 | 0.6 | 0.1 | 5.9 | 6.5 |
| Michael Ojo | 16 | 16 | 18:50 | .741 | .000 | .709 | 5.6 | 0.6 | 0.3 | 0.6 | 9.2 | 13.9 |
| Stratos Perperoglou | Not added to the roster | | | | | | | | | | | |
| Aleksa Radanov | 9 | 1 | 9:06 | .750 | .077 | .500 | 1.1 | 0.4 | 0.6 | 0.1 | 2.0 | 1.0 |
| Joe Ragland | Not added to the roster | | | | | | | | | | | |
| Dušan Ristić | 15 | 0 | 16:35 | .625 | .000 | .833 | 5.4 | 0.6 | 0.3 | 0.5 | 8.0 | 11.4 |
| K. C. Rivers | 14 | 2 | 21:39 | .507 | .406 | .765 | 2.9 | 2.4 | 1.3 | 0.2 | 11.8 | 10.4 |
| Boriša Simanić | 16 | 2 | 17:57 | .552 | .341 | .786 | 2.7 | 0.9 | 0.5 | 0.5 | 5.3 | 6.3 |

Last updated: June 17, 2019.
Source: kls.rs

=== Radivoj Korać Cup ===
| Player | GP | GS | MPG | 2FG% | 3FG% | FT% | RPG | APG | SPG | BPG | PPG | PIR |
|---|---|---|---|---|---|---|---|---|---|---|---|---|
| Billy Baron | 3 | 3 | 28:53 | .500 | .619 | .889 | 3.7 | 1.0 | 1.0 | 0.0 | 19.7 | 20.7 |
| Filip Čović | 3 | 0 | 11:20 | 1.000 | .000 | .333 | 1.0 | 4.0 | 1.3 | 0.0 | 2.0 | 6.3 |
| Dejan Davidovac | 3 | 0 | 21:08 | .875 | .692 | .667 | 3.7 | 0.7 | 0.7 | 0.3 | 15.0 | 17.0 |
| Ognjen Dobrić | 3 | 0 | 17:23 | .571 | .556 | .667 | 1.7 | 1.3 | 1.7 | 0.7 | 9.0 | 10.3 |
| Mouhammad Faye | Not added to the roster | | | | | | | | | | | |
| Marko Kešelj | 3 | 0 | 11:31 | .000 | .333 | .000 | 2.0 | 0.3 | 1.0 | 0.3 | 1.0 | -1.0 |
| Branko Lazić | 3 | 2 | 4:22 | 1.000 | .000 | .000 | 0.7 | 0.0 | 0.0 | 0.3 | 0.7 | 0.0 |
| Nemanja Nenadić | Did not play | | | | | | | | | | | |
| Michael Ojo | Not added to the roster | | | | | | | | | | | |
| Stratos Perperoglou | 3 | 1 | 24:27 | .364 | .118 | .667 | 5.0 | 1.3 | 1.3 | 0.3 | 6.0 | 5.0 |
| Aleksa Radanov | Did not play | | | | | | | | | | | |
| Joe Ragland | 3 | 3 | 25:19 | .500 | .273 | 1.000 | 3.0 | 8.7 | 0.7 | 0.0 | 9.7 | 13.0 |
| Dušan Ristić | 3 | 0 | 18:09 | .444 | .000 | .700 | 5.3 | 0.0 | 0.3 | 1.0 | 5.0 | 8.0 |
| K. C. Rivers | Not added to the roster | | | | | | | | | | | |
| Boriša Simanić | 3 | 3 | 20:29 | .333 | .235 | 1.000 | 3.0 | 0.3 | 0.0 | 1.3 | 7.3 | 8.0 |
| Lazar Vasić | Did not play | | | | | | | | | | | |
| Maik Zirbes | 3 | 3 | 17:00 | .462 | .000 | .750 | 5.0 | 0.3 | 0.0 | 0.7 | 5.0 | 6.3 |

Last updated: February 17, 2019.
Source: KSS

=== ABA Super Cup ===
| Player | GP | GS | MPG | 2FG% | 3FG% | FT% | RPG | APG | SPG | BPG | PPG | PIR |
|---|---|---|---|---|---|---|---|---|---|---|---|---|
| Billy Baron | 3 | 3 | 25:06 | .500 | .384 | .750 | 1.6 | 3.3 | 0.7 | 0.0 | 8.0 | 9.0 |
| Filip Čović | 2 | 0 | 17:38 | .333 | .400 | 1.000 | 3.0 | 2.5 | 1.0 | 0.0 | 6.5 | 10.5 |
| Dejan Davidovac | Did not play (Injured) | | | | | | | | | | | |
| Ognjen Dobrić | 2 | 0 | 15:28 | .000 | .556 | .000 | 1.5 | 1.5 | 0.5 | 0.0 | 7.5 | 6.5 |
| Mouhammad Faye | 3 | 3 | 24:13 | .714 | .461 | .667 | 6.3 | 2.3 | 1.3 | 1.3 | 12.7 | 17.3 |
| Stefan Janković | Did not play (Suspension) | | | | | | | | | | | |
| Marko Kešelj | 1 | 0 | 4:27 | 1.000 | .000 | .000 | 1.0 | 1.0 | 0.0 | 0.0 | 2.0 | 5.0 |
| Branko Lazić | 3 | 3 | 19:48 | .000 | .200 | 1.000 | 3.0 | 0.7 | 0.3 | 0.0 | 1.6 | 0.6 |
| Nemanja Nenadić | 1 | 0 | 14:52 | .500 | .500 | .750 | 2.0 | 5.0 | 3.0 | 0.0 | 8.0 | 15.0 |
| Michael Ojo | 3 | 0 | 15:22 | .875 | .000 | 1.000 | 3.3 | 0.3 | 0.3 | 0.7 | 6.0 | 9.0 |
| Stratos Perperoglou | 3 | 0 | 20:19 | .272 | .533 | 1.000 | 2.7 | 2.3 | 1.3 | 0.0 | 11.3 | 8.0 |
| Aleksa Radanov | 2 | 0 | 12:46 | .500 | .250 | .000 | 1.5 | 2.5 | 1.0 | 0.0 | 2.5 | 3.0 |
| Joe Ragland | 3 | 3 | 26:39 | .529 | .667 | .556 | 1.7 | 4.7 | 1.0 | 0.0 | 13.7 | 13.7 |
| Dušan Ristić | 3 | 0 | 5:52 | .700 | .000 | .500 | 2.0 | 0.0 | 0.3 | 0.6 | 5.3 | 6.0 |
| Boriša Simanić | 3 | 0 | 7:40 | .000 | .000 | .000 | 0.3 | 0.0 | 0.0 | 0.0 | 0.0 | -1.6 |
| Maik Zirbes | 3 | 3 | 18:20 | .592 | .000 | 1.000 | 5.0 | 1.0 | 1.0 | 0.3 | 11.7 | 14.7 |

Last updated: September 24, 2018.
Source: ABA League

== See also ==
- 2018–19 Red Star Belgrade season
- 2018–19 KK Partizan season
