= 2019 ABA League First Division Playoffs =

Tournament details
- Dates: March 23, 2019 – April 22, 2019
- Season: 2018–19
- Teams: 4
- Defending champions: (Montenegro) Budućnost VOLI

Final positions
- Champions: (Serbia) Crvena zvezda mts (4thth title)
- Runners-up: (Montenegro) Budućnost VOLI
- Semifinalists: (Croatia) Cedevita; (Serbia) Partizan NIS

Awards
- MVP: (United States) Billy Baron

The 2019 ABA League Playoffs was the play-off tournament that decides the winner of the 2018–19 ABA League First Division season. The playoffs had started on March 23, 2019 and ended on April 22, 2019. The winner of the play-offs, Crvena zvezda mts, qualified for the 2019–20 EuroLeague.

== Qualified teams ==
Round	Team	Ref.
1st	(Serbia) Crvena zvezda mts	
2nd	(Croatia) Cedevita	
3rd	(Montenegro) Budućnost VOLI	
4th	(Serbia) Partizan NIS	

== Bracket ==
Semifinals
March 23 – April 6
(Serbia) Crvena zvezda mts	2
(Serbia) Partizan NIS	1
March 25 – April 7
(Croatia) Cedevita	1
(Montenegro) Budućnost VOLI	2

Finals
April 12 – April 22
(Serbia) Crvena zvezda mts	3
(Montenegro) Budućnost VOLI	2

== Semifinals ==
Team 1	Series	Team 2	Game 1	Game 2	Game 3
Crvena zvezda mts (Serbia)	2–1	(Serbia) Partizan NIS	106–101	67–70	84–63
Cedevita (Croatia)	1–2	(Montenegro) Budućnost VOLI	90–83	72–87	73–78

=== Game 1 ===
==== Crvena zvezda v Partizan ====
23 March 2019	Crvena zvezda mts (Serbia)	106–101(OT) (Series: 1–0)	(Serbia) Partizan NIS	Belgrade
19:00	Scoring by quarter: 21–11, 15–24, 24–28, 25–22, Overtime: 21–16
Arena Sport	Pts: Baron 23; Rebs: Davidovac 6 Asts: Čović 9 PIR: Davidovac 26	Boxscore	Pts: Marinković 20; Rebs: Sy 6 Asts: Renfroe 8 PIR: Marinković 21	Arena: Aleksandar Nikolić Hall; Attendance: 5,989; Referees: Ilija Belošević, Damir Javor, Tomislav Hordov

Starters:			Pts	Reb	Ast
PG	1	(United States) Joe Ragland	6	0	1
SG	12	(United States) Billy Baron	23	2	0
SF	10	(Serbia) Branko Lazić	5	0	0
PF	11	(Senegal) Mouhammad Faye	2	5	0
C	50	(Nigeria) Michael Ojo	6	5	0
Reserves:					
PG	3	(Serbia) Filip Čović	16	1	9
SF	5	(Greece) Stratos Perperoglou	4	1	0
SF	7	(Serbia) Dejan Davidovac	18	6	2
G/F	13	(Serbia) Ognjen Dobrić	8	2	0
PF	22	(Serbia) Boriša Simanić	0	2	0
SG	23	(United States) K. C. Rivers	12	1	2
C	33	(Germany) Maik Zirbes	6	3	1
Head coach:
(Serbia) Milan Tomić

Crvena zvezda	Partizan

CZV	Statistics	PAR
22/30 (73%)	2-pt field goals	22/38 (58%)
11/31 (36%)	3-pt field goals	13/30 (43%)
29/41 (71%)	Free throws	18/25 (72%)
4	Offensive rebounds	8
24	Defensive rebounds	20
28	Total rebounds	28
15	Assists	22
10	Turnovers	10
5	Steals	1
5	Blocks	5
26 (33)	Fouls	33 (26)

Starters:			Pts	Reb	Ast
G	32	(Bosnia and Herzegovina) Alex Renfroe	14	3	8
SG	9	(Serbia) Vanja Marinković	20	1	2
F/C	33	(Serbia) Stefan Janković	4	2	0
PF	12	(Serbia) Novica Veličković	11	5	4
C	41	(Serbia) Đorđe Gagić	0	1	0
Reserves:					
F/C	1	(Serbia) Nikola Janković	8	3	0
G	2	(United States) Marcus Paige	3	2	1
F	5	(France) Bandja Sy	9	6	1
G	10	(Serbia) Ognjen Jaramaz	1	0	1
SF	25	(Serbia) Rade Zagorac	10	4	1
C	34	(Australia) Jock Landale	17	1	1
PG	77	(Slovenia) Aleksej Nikolić	4	0	3
Head coach:
(Italy) Andrea Trinchieri

==== Cedevita v Budućnost ====
25 March 2019	Cedevita (Croatia)	90–83 (Series: 1–0)	(Montenegro) Budućnost VOLI	Zagreb
19:00	Scoring by quarter: 21–18, 16–20, 28–21, 25–24
Arena Sport	Pts: Cobbs 23; Rebs: Stipanović 8 Asts: Cobbs 5 PIR: Cobbs 22	Boxscore	Pts: Clark 23; Rebs: Cole 5 Asts: Cole 7 PIR: Clark 18	Arena: Dražen Petrović Basketball Hall; Attendance: 4,500; Referees: Matej Boltauzer, Saša Pukl, Uroš Obrknežević

Starters:			Pts	Reb	Ast
PG	1	(United States) Justin Cobbs	23	2	5
SG	2	(Croatia) Filip Krušlin	8	1	0
SF	23	(United States) Elgin Cook	14	6	0
PF	27	(Croatia) Ivan Ramljak	2	4	3
C	13	(Bosnia and Herzegovina) Andrija Stipanović	12	8	4
Reserves:					
PG	0	(Georgia (country)) Jacob Pullen	20	0	2
PG	6	(Croatia) Toni Katić	0	0	2
C	11	(Croatia) Karlo Žganec	0	3	1
PF	15	(Croatia) Marko Banić	2	1	0
SG	19	(Croatia) Domagoj Bošnjak	DNP		
SG	29	(Croatia) Jakov Mustapić	DNP		
SF	88	(Slovenia) Edo Murić	9	6	2
Head coach:
(Croatia) Slaven Rimac

Cedevita	Budućnost

CED	Statistics	BUD
20/38 (53%)	2-pt field goals	24/40 (60%)
7/17 (41%)	3-pt field goals	8/28 (29%)
29/34 (85%)	Free throws	11/19 (58%)
12	Offensive rebounds	9
19	Defensive rebounds	15
31	Total rebounds	24
19	Assists	24
16	Turnovers	13
5	Steals	7
3	Blocks	5
22 (30)	Fouls	30 (21)

Starters:			Pts	Reb	Ast
PG	10	(Bosnia and Herzegovina) Nemanja Gordić	11	2	6
SG	1	(France) Edwin Jackson	9	3	3
SF	31	(United States) James Bell	9	1	2
PF	5	(United States) Earl Clark	23	4	3
C	6	(Montenegro) Filip Barović	0	2	1
Reserves:					
PG	3	(United States) Norris Cole	13	5	7
SG	4	(Montenegro) Suad Šehović	6	1	0
SF	7	(United States) Coty Clarke	2	2	1
SF	8	(Montenegro) Sead Šehović	DNP		
C	11	(Georgia (country)) Goga Bitadze	8	4	0
SG	30	(Montenegro) Petar Popović	2	0	1
PF	34	(Montenegro) Danilo Nikolić	DNP		
Head coach:
(Croatia) Jasmin Repeša

=== Game 2 ===
==== Partizan v Crvena zvezda ====
30 March 2019	Partizan NIS (Serbia)	70–67 (Series: 1–1)	(Serbia) Crvena zvezda mts	Belgrade
19:00	Scoring by quarter: 13–9, 21–18, 14–22, 22–18
Arena Sport	Pts: Marinković 18; Rebs: Landale 8 Asts: four players 3 PIR: Marinković 22	Boxscore	Pts: Perperoglou 16; Rebs: Ojo 6 Asts: Čović 7 PIR: Perperoglou 12	Arena: Aleksandar Nikolić Hall; Attendance: 6,500; Referees: Matej Boltauzer, Saša Pukl, Miloš Koljenšić

Starters:			Pts	Reb	Ast
G	32	(Bosnia and Herzegovina) Alex Renfroe	6	2	3
G	2	(United States) Marcus Paige	8	0	3
F	5	(France) Bandja Sy	4	5	0
PF	12	(Serbia) Novica Veličković	7	3	0
C	41	(Serbia) Đorđe Gagić	3	1	1
Reserves:					
F/C	1	(Serbia) Nikola Janković	0	2	0
SG	9	(Serbia) Vanja Marinković	18	3	3
G	10	(Serbia) Ognjen Jaramaz	3	0	0
SF	25	(Serbia) Rade Zagorac	4	1	0
F/C	33	(Serbia) Stefan Janković	1	4	0
C	34	(Australia) Jock Landale	10	8	1
PG	77	(Slovenia) Aleksej Nikolić	6	1	3
Head coach:
(Italy) Andrea Trinchieri

Partizan	Crvena zvezda

PAR	Statistics	CZV
11/34 (35%)	2-pt field goals	19/27 (70%)
9/23 (39%)	3-pt field goals	5/28 (18%)
21/29 (72%)	Free throws	14/24 (58%)
8	Offensive rebounds	9
22	Defensive rebounds	26
30	Total rebounds	35
14	Assists	17
8	Turnovers	10
4	Steals	5
5	Blocks	5
25 (25)	Fouls	25 (25)

Starters:			Pts	Reb	Ast
SG	23	(United States) K. C. Rivers	6	5	2
SG	12	(United States) Billy Baron	7	1	1
SF	10	(Serbia) Branko Lazić	5	3	0
PF	11	(Senegal) Mouhammad Faye	4	4	2
C	50	(Nigeria) Michael Ojo	3	6	0
Reserves:					
PG	3	(Serbia) Filip Čović	6	2	7
SF	5	(Greece) Stratos Perperoglou	16	1	2
SF	7	(Serbia) Dejan Davidovac	3	1	2
G	9	(Serbia) Nemanja Nenadić	DNP		
G/F	13	(Serbia) Ognjen Dobrić	3	2	0
PF	22	(Serbia) Boriša Simanić	3	5	0
C	33	(Germany) Maik Zirbes	11	5	1
Head coach:
(Serbia) Milan Tomić

==== Budućnost v Cedevita ====
31 March 2019	Budućnost VOLI (Montenegro)	87–72 (Series: 1–1)	(Croatia) Cedevita	Podgorica
19:00	Scoring by quarter: 16–17, 17–14, 25–19, 29–22
	Pts: Jackson 15; Rebs: Jackson 6 Asts: Cole 9 PIR: Jackson 18	Boxscore	Pts: Pullen 18; Rebs: Ramljak 5 Asts: Katić 4 PIR: Pullen, Krušlin 16	Arena: Morača Sports Center; Attendance: 5,280; Referees: Ilija Belošević, Marko Juras, Uroš Nikolić

Starters:			Pts	Reb	Ast
PG	3	(United States) Norris Cole	11	4	9
SG	1	(France) Edwin Jackson	15	6	2
SF	4	(Montenegro) Suad Šehović	10	2	1
PF	34	(Montenegro) Danilo Nikolić	11	5	1
C	6	(Montenegro) Filip Barović	4	4	0
Reserves:					
PF	5	(United States) Earl Clark	5	2	1
SF	8	(Montenegro) Sead Šehović	DNP		
PG	10	(Bosnia and Herzegovina) Nemanja Gordić	11	1	3
C	11	(Georgia (country)) Goga Bitadze	11	5	0
SG	30	(Montenegro) Petar Popović	0	0	0
SF	31	(United States) James Bell	9	5	0
PF	41	(United States) Devin Williams	DNP		
Head coach:
(Croatia) Jasmin Repeša

Budućnost	Cedevita

BUD	Statistics	CED
22/38 (58%)	2-pt field goals	13/32 (41%)
11/27 (41%)	3-pt field goals	9/23 (39%)
10/17 (59%)	Free throws	19/25 (75%)
9	Offensive rebounds	6
25	Defensive rebounds	20
34	Total rebounds	26
17	Assists	14
12	Turnovers	12
7	Steals	4
4	Blocks	1
26 (21)	Fouls	21 (26)

Starters:			Pts	Reb	Ast
PG	1	(United States) Justin Cobbs	11	2	2
SG	2	(Croatia) Filip Krušlin	11	4	2
SF	23	(United States) Elgin Cook	3	1	1
PF	27	(Croatia) Ivan Ramljak	8	5	1
C	13	(Bosnia and Herzegovina) Andrija Stipanović	8	4	1
Reserves:					
PG	0	(Georgia (country)) Jacob Pullen	18	2	0
PG	6	(Croatia) Toni Katić	2	1	4
C	11	(Croatia) Karlo Žganec	1	3	3
PF	15	(Croatia) Marko Banić	4	1	0
SG	29	(Croatia) Jakov Mustapić	DNP		
SF	88	(Slovenia) Edo Murić	6	3	0
Head coach:
(Croatia) Slaven Rimac

=== Game 3 ===
==== Crvena zvezda v Partizan ====
6 April 2019	Crvena zvezda mts (Serbia)	84–63 (Series: 2–1)	(Serbia) Partizan NIS	Belgrade
18:00	Scoring by quarter: 21–13, 23–15, 20–13, 20–22
Arena Sport	Pts: Perperoglou 18; Rebs: Ojo 8 Asts: Čović 6 PIR: Čović, Dobrić 13	Boxscore	Pts: Marinković 12; Rebs: Paige, Veličković 6 Asts: Renfroe 8 PIR: N. Janković 15	Arena: Aleksandar Nikolić Hall; Attendance: 6,858; Referees: Sreten Radović, Sašo Petek, Mario Majkić

Starters:			Pts	Reb	Ast
SF	7	(Serbia) Dejan Davidovac	4	2	3
SG	12	(United States) Billy Baron	8	2	4
SF	10	(Serbia) Branko Lazić	0	2	0
PF	11	(Senegal) Mouhammad Faye	6	5	0
C	50	(Nigeria) Michael Ojo	9	8	0
Reserves:					
PG	3	(Serbia) Filip Čović	10	1	6
SF	5	(Greece) Stratos Perperoglou	18	1	0
G	9	(Serbia) Nemanja Nenadić	1	0	0
G/F	13	(Serbia) Ognjen Dobrić	10	7	0
PF	22	(Serbia) Boriša Simanić	8	2	1
SG	23	(United States) K. C. Rivers	6	0	2
C	33	(Germany) Maik Zirbes	4	4	0
Head coach:
(Serbia) Milan Tomić

Crvena zvezda	Partizan

CZV	Statistics	PAR
22/35 (57%)	2-pt field goals	14/34 (41%)
11/24 (46%)	3-pt field goals	5/25 (20%)
11/20 (55%)	Free throws	20/31 (65%)
5	Offensive rebounds	7
29	Defensive rebounds	20
34	Total rebounds	27
16	Assists	13
19	Turnovers	16
5	Steals	11
12	Blocks	12
30 (26)	Fouls	26 (30)

Starters:			Pts	Reb	Ast
G	32	(Bosnia and Herzegovina) Alex Renfroe	0	4	8
G	2	(United States) Marcus Paige	11	6	2
F	5	(France) Bandja Sy	0	2	0
PF	12	(Serbia) Novica Veličković	8	6	0
C	41	(Serbia) Đorđe Gagić	3	1	0
Reserves:					
F/C	1	(Serbia) Nikola Janković	10	4	0
SG	9	(Serbia) Vanja Marinković	12	1	0
G	10	(Serbia) Ognjen Jaramaz	6	1	1
SF	25	(Serbia) Rade Zagorac	8	1	0
F/C	33	(Serbia) Stefan Janković	3	0	0
C	34	(Australia) Jock Landale	0	0	1
PG	77	(Slovenia) Aleksej Nikolić	2	1	1
Head coach:
(Italy) Andrea Trinchieri

==== Cedevita v Budućnost ====
7 April 2019	Cedevita (Croatia)	73–78 (Series: 1–2)	(Montenegro) Budućnost VOLI	Zagreb
19:00	Scoring by quarter: 21–10, 20–29, 17–18, 15–21
	Pts: Cobbs 23; Rebs: Ramljak 12; Asts: Cobbs 4 PIR: Cobbs 20	Boxscore	Pts: Clark 19; Rebs: Bitadze 7 Asts: Gordić 5 PIR: Gordić 16	Arena: Dražen Petrović Basketball Hall; Attendance: 5,500; Referees: Matej Boltauzer, Damir Javor, Milivoje Jovčić

Starters:			Pts	Reb	Ast
PG	1	(United States) Justin Cobbs	23	1	4
SG	2	(Croatia) Filip Krušlin	6	5	3
SF	23	(United States) Elgin Cook	8	6	2
PF	27	(Croatia) Ivan Ramljak	6	12	2
C	13	(Bosnia and Herzegovina) Andrija Stipanović	4	1	0
Reserves:					
PG	0	(Georgia (country)) Jacob Pullen	14	2	0
PG	6	(Croatia) Toni Katić	1	2	1
C	11	(Croatia) Karlo Žganec	0	0	1
PF	15	(Croatia) Marko Banić	4	3	0
SG	19	(Croatia) Domagoj Bošnjak	DNP		
SG	29	(Croatia) Jakov Mustapić	DNP		
SF	88	(Slovenia) Edo Murić	7	2	1
Head coach:
(Croatia) Slaven Rimac

Cedevita	Budućnost

CED	Statistics	BUD
19/32 (59%)	2-pt field goals	20/32 (62%)
5/25 (20%)	3-pt field goals	5/21 (23%)
20/32 (62%)	Free throws	23/34 (67%)
12	Offensive rebounds	7
22	Defensive rebounds	21
34	Total rebounds	28
14	Assists	14
13	Turnovers	14
8	Steals	5
1	Blocks	5
28 (28)	Fouls	28 (27)

Starters:			Pts	Reb	Ast
PG	3	(United States) Norris Cole	5	3	1
SG	1	(France) Edwin Jackson	11	2	3
SG	4	(Montenegro) Suad Šehović	0	1	1
PF	5	(United States) Earl Clark	19	5	0
C	11	(Georgia (country)) Goga Bitadze	13	7	0
Reserves:					
C	6	(Montenegro) Filip Barović	2	5	2
SF	7	(United States) Coty Clarke	4	0	2
PG	10	(Bosnia and Herzegovina) Nemanja Gordić	15	2	5
SG	30	(Montenegro) Petar Popović	DNP		
SF	31	(United States) James Bell	7	1	0
PF	34	(Montenegro) Danilo Nikolić	2	2	0
F/C	41	(United States) Devin Williams	DNP		
Head coach:
(Croatia) Jasmin Repeša

== Finals ==
Team 1	Series	Team 2	Game 1	Game 2	Game 3	Game 4	Game 5
Crvena zvezda mts (Serbia)	3–2	(Montenegro) Budućnost VOLI	91–72	107–69	72–80	80–84	97–54

=== Game 1 ===
12 April 2019 Finals 1	Crvena zvezda mts (Serbia)	91–72 (Series: 1–0)	(Montenegro) Budućnost VOLI	Belgrade
19:00	Scoring by quarter: 18–20, 27–22, 20–10, 26–20
Arena Sport	Pts: Baron 19; Rebs: Zirbes, Ojo 6 Asts: Čović 6 PIR: Baron 27	Boxscore	Pts: Cole 18; Rebs: Bitadze, Clarke 6 Asts: Cole, Gordić 4 PIR: Cole 16	Arena: Aleksandar Nikolić Hall; Attendance: 6,374; Referees: Matej Boltauzer, Saša Pukl, Tomislav Hordov

Starters:			Pts	Reb	Ast
SG	12	(United States) Billy Baron	19	4	5
SF	7	(Serbia) Dejan Davidovac	8	5	4
SF	10	(Serbia) Branko Lazić	3	1	0
PF	11	(Senegal) Mouhammad Faye	7	5	1
C	50	(Nigeria) Michael Ojo	8	6	1
Reserves:					
PG	3	(Serbia) Filip Čović	8	2	6
SF	5	(Greece) Stratos Perperoglou	7	1	1
G	9	(Serbia) Nemanja Nenadić	0	0	0
G/F	13	(Serbia) Ognjen Dobrić	12	2	0
PF	22	(Serbia) Boriša Simanić	3	0	2
SG	23	(United States) K. C. Rivers	7	0	1
C	33	(Germany) Maik Zirbes	9	6	1
Head coach:
(Serbia) Milan Tomić

Crvena zvezda	Budućnost

CZV	Statistics	BUD
17/30 (57%)	2-pt field goals	16/35 (46%)
12/22 (55%)	3-pt field goals	7/24 (29%)
21/34 (62%)	Free throws	19/29 (66%)
6	Offensive rebounds	14
26	Defensive rebounds	20
32	Total rebounds	34
22	Assists	14
11	Turnovers	13
7	Steals	5
7	Blocks	7
26 (26)	Fouls	27 (25)

Starters:			Pts	Reb	Ast
PG	3	(United States) Norris Cole	18	3	4
SG	1	(France) Edwin Jackson	6	2	3
SG	4	(Montenegro) Suad Šehović	0	0	0
PF	5	(United States) Earl Clark	8	3	0
C	11	(Georgia (country)) Goga Bitadze	6	6	1
Reserves:					
C	6	(Montenegro) Filip Barović	5	3	0
SF	7	(United States) Coty Clarke	8	6	0
PG	10	(Bosnia and Herzegovina) Nemanja Gordić	8	1	4
SG	30	(Montenegro) Petar Popović	2	0	1
SF	31	(United States) James Bell	5	4	0
PF	34	(Montenegro) Danilo Nikolić	3	3	1
F/C	41	(United States) Devin Williams	3	3	0
Head coach:
(Croatia) Jasmin Repeša

=== Game 2 ===
14 April 2019 Finals 2	Crvena zvezda mts (Serbia)	107–69 (Series: 2–0)	(Montenegro) Budućnost VOLI	Belgrade
19:00	Scoring by quarter: 26–19, 28–19, 22–16, 31–15
Arena Sport	Pts: Perperoglou 17; Rebs: Faye 6 Asts: Čović 7 PIR: Rivers 20	Boxscore	Pts: Gordić 11; Rebs: Jackson 7 Asts: Gordić 6 PIR: Gordić 18	Arena: Aleksandar Nikolić Hall; Attendance: 6,397; Referees: Sreten Radović, Damir Javor, Miloš Koljenšić

Starters:			Pts	Reb	Ast
SG	12	(United States) Billy Baron	10	3	3
SF	7	(Serbia) Dejan Davidovac	6	1	0
SF	10	(Serbia) Branko Lazić	0	0	0
PF	11	(Senegal) Mouhammad Faye	8	6	4
C	50	(Nigeria) Michael Ojo	10	5	0
Reserves:					
PG	3	(Serbia) Filip Čović	9	3	7
SF	5	(Greece) Stratos Perperoglou	17	2	0
G	9	(Serbia) Nemanja Nenadić	5	0	0
G/F	13	(Serbia) Ognjen Dobrić	12	1	0
PF	22	(Serbia) Boriša Simanić	6	3	0
SG	23	(United States) K. C. Rivers	16	1	5
C	33	(Germany) Maik Zirbes	8	1	1
Head coach:
(Serbia) Milan Tomić

Crvena zvezda	Budućnost

CZV	Statistics	BUD
25/30 (83%)	2-pt field goals	21/40 (53%)
12/25 (48%)	3-pt field goals	5/17 (29%)
21/30 (70%)	Free throws	12/22 (55%)
3	Offensive rebounds	7
23	Defensive rebounds	17
26	Total rebounds	24
20	Assists	13
7	Turnovers	14
10	Steals	5
3	Blocks	3
25 (24)	Fouls	28 (24)

Starters:			Pts	Reb	Ast
PG	3	(United States) Norris Cole	9	0	1
SG	1	(France) Edwin Jackson	2	7	1
SG	4	(Montenegro) Suad Šehović	0	2	0
PF	5	(United States) Earl Clark	7	1	0
C	11	(Georgia (country)) Goga Bitadze	9	5	0
Reserves:					
C	6	(Montenegro) Filip Barović	10	3	2
SF	7	(United States) Coty Clarke	4	1	1
PG	10	(Bosnia and Herzegovina) Nemanja Gordić	11	0	6
SG	30	(Montenegro) Petar Popović	2	1	1
SF	31	(United States) James Bell	10	1	1
PF	34	(Montenegro) Danilo Nikolić	5	3	0
F/C	41	(United States) Devin Williams	0	0	0
Head coach:
(Croatia) Jasmin Repeša

=== Game 3 ===
17 April 2019 Finals 3	Budućnost VOLI (Montenegro)	80–72 (Series: 1–2)	(Serbia) Crvena zvezda mts	Podgorica
19:00	Scoring by quarter: 18–25, 27–25, 21–8, 14–14
Arena Sport	Pts: Cole 20; Rebs: Cole 7 Asts: Gordić 4 PIR: Cole 20	Boxscore	Pts: Rivers 19; Rebs: Faye, Ojo 10; Asts: Čović 4 PIR: Faye 15	Arena: Morača Sports Center; Attendance: 5,860; Referees: Tomislav Hordov, Mario Majkić, Marko Juras

Starters:			Pts	Reb	Ast
PG	3	(United States) Norris Cole	20	7	2
SG	1	(France) Edwin Jackson	10	4	1
SG	4	(Montenegro) Suad Šehović	0	3	0
PF	5	(United States) Earl Clark	3	2	0
C	6	(Montenegro) Filip Barović	8	3	2
Reserves:					
SF	7	(United States) Coty Clarke	14	2	2
PG	10	(Bosnia and Herzegovina) Nemanja Gordić	5	0	4
C	11	(Georgia (country)) Goga Bitadze	4	4	0
SG	30	(Montenegro) Petar Popović	DNP		
SF	31	(United States) James Bell	8	1	1
PF	34	(Montenegro) Danilo Nikolić	8	3	1
F/C	41	(United States) Devin Williams	DNP		
Head coach:
(Croatia) Jasmin Repeša

Budućnost	Crvena zvezda

BUD	Statistics	CZV
23/47 (49%)	2-pt field goals	11/25 (44%)
5/16 (31%)	3-pt field goals	9/29 (31%)
19/25 (76%)	Free throws	23/30 (77%)
6	Offensive rebounds	8
23	Defensive rebounds	28
29	Total rebounds	36
13	Assists	11
6	Turnovers	16
9	Steals	0
1	Blocks	4
27 (26)	Fouls	26 (27)

Starters:			Pts	Reb	Ast
SG	12	(United States) Billy Baron	12	3	1
SF	7	(Serbia) Dejan Davidovac	0	5	0
SF	10	(Serbia) Branko Lazić	5	0	1
PF	11	(Senegal) Mouhammad Faye	7	10	1
C	33	(Germany) Maik Zirbes	10	3	0
Reserves:					
PG	3	(Serbia) Filip Čović	10	1	4
SF	4	(Serbia) Marko Kešelj	DNP		
G	9	(Serbia) Nemanja Nenadić	DNP		
G/F	13	(Serbia) Ognjen Dobrić	5	1	1
PF	22	(Serbia) Boriša Simanić	0	1	0
SG	23	(United States) K. C. Rivers	19	2	2
C	50	(Nigeria) Michael Ojo	4	10	1
Head coach:
(Serbia) Milan Tomić

=== Game 4 ===
19 April 2019 Finals 4	Budućnost VOLI (Montenegro)	84–80 (Series: 2–2)	(Serbia) Crvena zvezda mts	Podgorica
19:00	Scoring by quarter: 20–25, 15–13, 22–20, 27–22
Arena Sport	Pts: Cole 31; Rebs: Cole, Clark 6 Asts: Cole 6 PIR: Cole 36	Boxscore	Pts: Baron 24; Rebs: Ojo 10; Asts: Faye 4 PIR: Baron 23	Arena: Morača Sports Center; Attendance: 5,360; Referees: Damir Javor, Sašo Petek, Uroš Nikolić

Starters:			Pts	Reb	Ast
PG	3	(United States) Norris Cole	31	6	6
SG	1	(France) Edwin Jackson	23	2	2
SG	4	(Montenegro) Suad Šehović	2	0	0
PF	5	(United States) Earl Clark	15	6	0
C	6	(Montenegro) Filip Barović	3	5	1
Reserves:					
SF	7	(United States) Coty Clarke	0	2	0
PG	10	(Bosnia and Herzegovina) Nemanja Gordić	7	1	0
C	11	(Georgia (country)) Goga Bitadze	2	3	0
SG	30	(Montenegro) Petar Popović	0	1	0
SF	31	(United States) James Bell	1	1	0
PF	34	(Montenegro) Danilo Nikolić	0	1	1
F/C	41	(United States) Devin Williams	DNP		
Head coach:
(Croatia) Jasmin Repeša

Budućnost	Crvena zvezda

BUD	Statistics	CZV
23/42 (41%)	2-pt field goals	18/38 (47%)
7/17 (41%)	3-pt field goals	9/22 (41%)
17/28 (61%)	Free throws	17/23 (74%)
7	Offensive rebounds	13
21	Defensive rebounds	27
28	Total rebounds	40
9	Assists	13
8	Turnovers	14
5	Steals	3
2	Blocks	3
25 (25)	Fouls	25 (25)

Starters:			Pts	Reb	Ast
SG	12	(United States) Billy Baron	24	4	3
G/F	13	(Serbia) Ognjen Dobrić	14	4	1
SF	7	(Serbia) Dejan Davidovac	8	4	1
PF	11	(Senegal) Mouhammad Faye	14	7	4
C	50	(Nigeria) Michael Ojo	8	10	0
Reserves:					
PG	3	(Serbia) Filip Čović	2	0	2
SF	4	(Serbia) Marko Kešelj	0	0	0
G	9	(Serbia) Nemanja Nenadić	DNP		
SF	10	(Serbia) Branko Lazić	0	1	0
PF	22	(Serbia) Boriša Simanić	DNP		
SG	23	(United States) K. C. Rivers	3	5	2
C	33	(Germany) Maik Zirbes	7	5	0
Head coach:
(Serbia) Milan Tomić

=== Game 5 ===
22 April 2019 Finals 5	Crvena zvezda mts (Serbia)	97–54 (Series: 3–2)	(Montenegro) Budućnost VOLI	Belgrade
19:00	Scoring by quarter: 18–13, 29–8, 27–16, 23–17
Arena Sport; O2.TV	Pts: Rivers 21; Rebs: Ojo, Rivers 6 Asts: Čović 9 PIR: Rivers, Simanić 21	Boxscore	Pts: Cole 9 Rebs: Clark 7 Asts: Cole 3 PIR: Cole, Gordić 10	Arena: Aleksandar Nikolić Hall; Attendance: 6,500; Referees: Saša Pukl, Tomislav Hordov, Mario Majkić

Starters:			Pts	Reb	Ast
SG	12	(United States) Billy Baron	7	3	5
SF	7	(Serbia) Dejan Davidovac	11	5	2
SF	10	(Serbia) Branko Lazić	5	0	1
PF	11	(Senegal) Mouhammad Faye	10	5	2
C	50	(Nigeria) Michael Ojo	10	6	2
Reserves:					
PG	3	(Serbia) Filip Čović	9	2	9
SF	4	(Serbia) Marko Kešelj	3	0	1
G	9	(Serbia) Nemanja Nenadić	0	0	2
G/F	13	(Serbia) Ognjen Dobrić	6	5	0
PF	22	(Serbia) Boriša Simanić	10	5	3
SG	23	(United States) K. C. Rivers	21	6	0
C	33	(Germany) Maik Zirbes	5	2	0
Head coach:
(Serbia) Milan Tomić

Crvena zvezda	Budućnost

CZV	Statistics	BUD
17/28 (61%)	2-pt field goals	11/39 (28%)
16/32 (50%)	3-pt field goals	6/23 (26%)
15/21 (71%)	Free throws	14/21 (67%)
7	Offensive rebounds	8
32	Defensive rebounds	17
39	Total rebounds	25
27	Assists	9
11	Turnovers	9
4	Steals	3
5	Blocks	1
25 (22)	Fouls	23 (24)

Starters:			Pts	Reb	Ast
PG	3	(United States) Norris Cole	9	2	3
PG	10	(Bosnia and Herzegovina) Nemanja Gordić	7	2	2
SG	1	(France) Edwin Jackson	7	1	1
PF	5	(United States) Earl Clark	2	7	0
C	6	(Montenegro) Filip Barović	0	1	0
Reserves:					
SG	4	(Montenegro) Suad Šehović	3	1	0
SF	7	(United States) Coty Clarke	0	0	0
C	11	(Georgia (country)) Goga Bitadze	7	3	0
SG	30	(Montenegro) Petar Popović	3	2	1
SF	31	(United States) James Bell	3	1	1
PF	34	(Montenegro) Danilo Nikolić	6	4	1
F/C	41	(United States) Devin Williams	7	1	0
Head coach:
(Croatia) Jasmin Repeša

== See also ==
- 2019 ABA League Second Division Playoffs
- 2018 ABA League Playoffs
- 2018–19 KK Crvena zvezda season
