= Michael Ojo (basketball, born 1993) =

Nigerian-American basketball player (1993–2020)

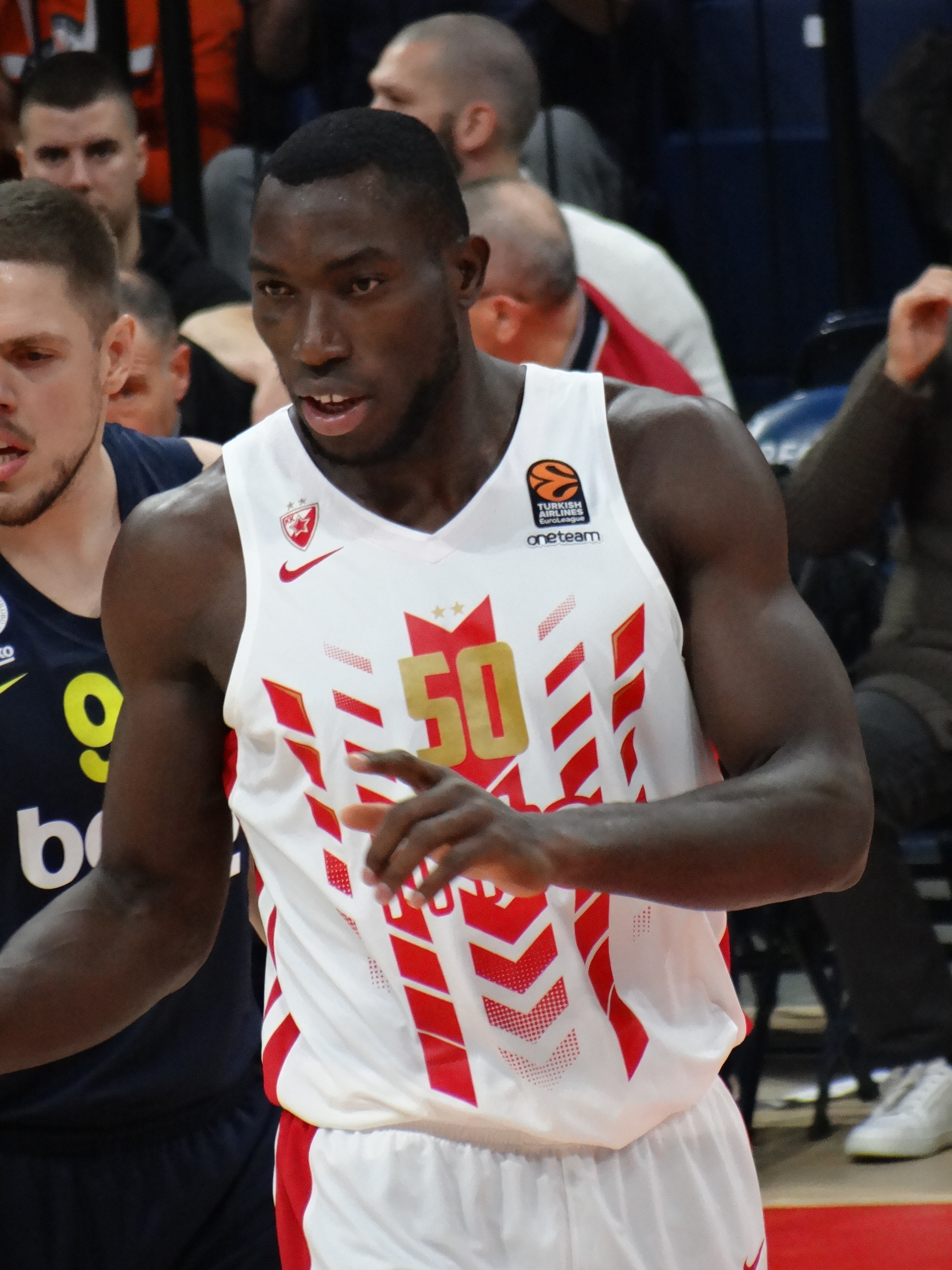
- Ojo with Crvena zvezda in 2019

Personal information
- Born: January 5, 1993 Lagos, Nigeria
- Died: August 7, 2020 (aged 27) Belgrade, Serbia
- Listed height: 7 ft 1 in (2.16 m)
- Listed weight: 310 lb (141 kg)

Career information
- High school: Tennessee Temple (Chattanooga, Tennessee)
- College: Florida State (2012–2017)
- NBA draft: 2017: undrafted
- Playing career: 2017–2020
- Position: Center
- Number: 50

Career history
- 2017–2018: FMP
- 2018–2020: Crvena zvezda

Career highlights
- Adriatic League champion (2019); Serbian League champion (2019); Adriatic Supercup winner (2018)

Michael Olalekan Ojo (January 5, 1993 – August 7, 2020) was a Nigerian-American professional basketball player. After competing in college basketball for the Florida State Seminoles, he played professionally for three seasons with Serbian clubs FMP and Crvena zvezda. Ojo died of a heart attack at the age of 27.

== Early life ==
Ojo was born on January 5, 1993, in Lagos, Nigeria, Ojo is the son of Olayinminu Ojo. Ojo attended Tennessee Temple Academy in Chattanooga, Tennessee. In 2012, he earned All-American Honors as a senior from the National Association of Christian Athletes and named to the All-Tournament Team at the National Association of Christian Athletes Tournament. As a senior, he averaged 15.0 points, 14.0 rebounds and 5.0 blocks per game.

== College career ==
Ojo attended Florida State University. He selected Florida State over Vanderbilt University and the University of Tennessee at Chattanooga.

He played four seasons of college basketball for the Florida State Seminoles under Leonard Hamilton, from 2012 to 2017. He missed the 2015–16 season but remained enrolled at the school as a medical redshirt. Afterward, as a senior, Ojo averaged 4.9 points and 3.2 rebounds per game.

== Professional career ==
=== FMP (2017–2018) ===
On August 17, 2017, Ojo signed a multi-year contract with Serbian club FMP. Ojo made his ABA League debut on September 19, recording 8 points and 2 rebounds, in a 74–67 loss to Cedevita. On October 20, he recorded 11 points and 12 rebounds in a 91–76 win over Zadar. On March 3, 2018, he scored 19 points and recorded 9 rebounds in an 86–81 loss to Petrol Olimpija. Ojo averaged 11.7 points, 5.9 rebounds, and 1.1 blocks over 21 games with FMP in the ABA League. He also appeared in the 2018 Serbian SuperLeague season. On May 3, 2018, he scored season-high 21 points and recorded season-high 17 rebounds in an 87–82 win over Partizan NIS. Ojo averaged 10.4 points and 5.6 rebounds over 14 games in the SuperLeague.

=== Crvena zvezda (2018–2020) ===
On July 18, 2018, Ojo inked a two-year deal with another Serbian club, Crvena zvezda. In the beginning of the season, he won 2018 ABA League Supercup with Crvena zvezda. In the 2018–19 season, his first with the club, he averaged 6.5 points and 4.5 rebounds over 16 EuroCup games. He won the ABA League in the same season, as well as Serbian League championship.

During the 2019–20 season, Ojo appeared in 22 EuroLeague games with Crvena zvezda, averaging 4.1 points and 3 rebounds per game. On March 9, 2020, against FMP, Ojo recorded 10 points and 2 rebounds in what would be his final game. The season was temporarily suspended three days later and canceled definitely in May 2020 due to the COVID-19 pandemic in all competitions the Zvezda has played.

During two seasons he played with Crvena zvezda, Ojo appeared in 108 games in domestic, regional and European competitions.

== Career statistics ==
Legend
GP	Games played	GS	Games started	MPG	Minutes per game
FG%	Field-goal percentage	3P%	3-point field-goal percentage	FT%	Free-throw percentage
RPG	Rebounds per game	APG	Assists per game	SPG	Steals per game
BPG	Blocks per game	PPG	Points per game	PIR	Performance index rating
**Bold**	Career high

=== EuroLeague ===
Year	Team	GP	GS	MPG	FG%	3P%	FT%	RPG	APG	SPG	BPG	PPG	PIR
2019–20	Crvena zvezda	22	3	11.4	.622	.000	.761	3.0	.3	.8	.2	4.1	5.0

=== EuroCup ===
Year	Team	GP	GS	MPG	FG%	3P%	FT%	RPG	APG	SPG	BPG	PPG	PIR
2018–19	Crvena zvezda	16	2	15:09	.707	.000	.647	4.5	.4	.5	0.9	6.5	10.4

=== College ===
Year	Team	GP	GS	MPG	FG%	3P%	FT%	RPG	APG	SPG	BPG	PPG
2012–13	Florida State	27	9	5.0	.292	.000	.364	1.0	.1	.1	.3	.7
2013–14	Florida State	**36**	14	11.9	.547	.000	.426	3.0	**.3**	.1	.7	2.5
2014–15	Florida State	33	21	8.8	.529	.000	.386	2.4	.2	.2	.5	2.2
2015–16	Florida State	Redshirt season										
2016–17	Florida State	35	**34**	**12.2**	**.564**	.000	**.806**	**3.2**	.2	**.3**	**.9**	**4.9**
**Career**		131	78	9.8	.525	.000	.569	2.5	.2	.2	.6	2.7

== Personal life ==
Ojo wore a shoe size 21 (US sizing systems). Nike invested in a US$15,000 machine to create a shoe to properly fit Ojo.

=== Death ===
On August 7, 2020, he unexpectedly died from a heart attack during training in Belgrade, Serbia, at the age of 27 whilst also testing positive for COVID-19. He was conducting an individual training session at the Partizan Stadium when he collapsed. Crvena zvezda requested an investigation from the authorities regarding his death. Reportedly, he did not have a training permit because he tested positive for COVID-19 in July.

A moment of silence was held before all 7DAYS EuroCup and Turkish Airlines EuroLeague games in Round 1 of the 2020–21 season in his memory, as well as the late CSKA Moscow team doctor Roman Abzhelilov. The same was held in the ABA League.

== See also ==
- List of basketball players who died during their careers
- List of KK Crvena zvezda players with 100 games played
