= Ed Sedar =

American baseball player & coach

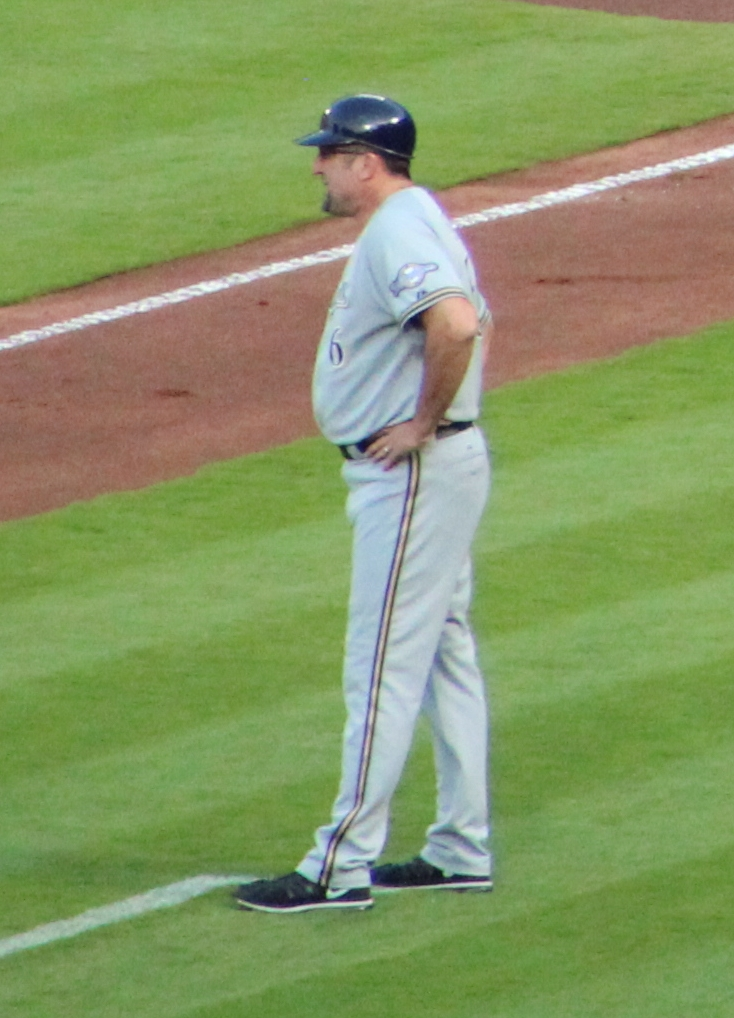
- Sedar with the Milwaukee Brewers in 2014
- Coach
- Born: August 8, 1961 (age 64); Waukegan, Illinois, U.S.
- Bats: Right Throws: Right
- Stats at Baseball Reference

Teams
- Milwaukee Brewers (2007–2021)

Edward Joseph Sedar (born August 8, 1961) is an American former professional baseball coach. He previously served as the first base coach for the Milwaukee Brewers of Major League Baseball (MLB) from 2007 to 2010 and as the third base coach from 2011 to 2021.

== Biography ==
Sedar played eight seasons as an outfielder in the Chicago White Sox organization after playing collegiate ball at College of Lake County. He later became a manager in the Brewers organization with the Ogden Raptors and Helena Brewers.

On October 25, 2021, Sedar announced his retirement from coaching.
