= Mouhammad Faye =

Senegalese basketball player

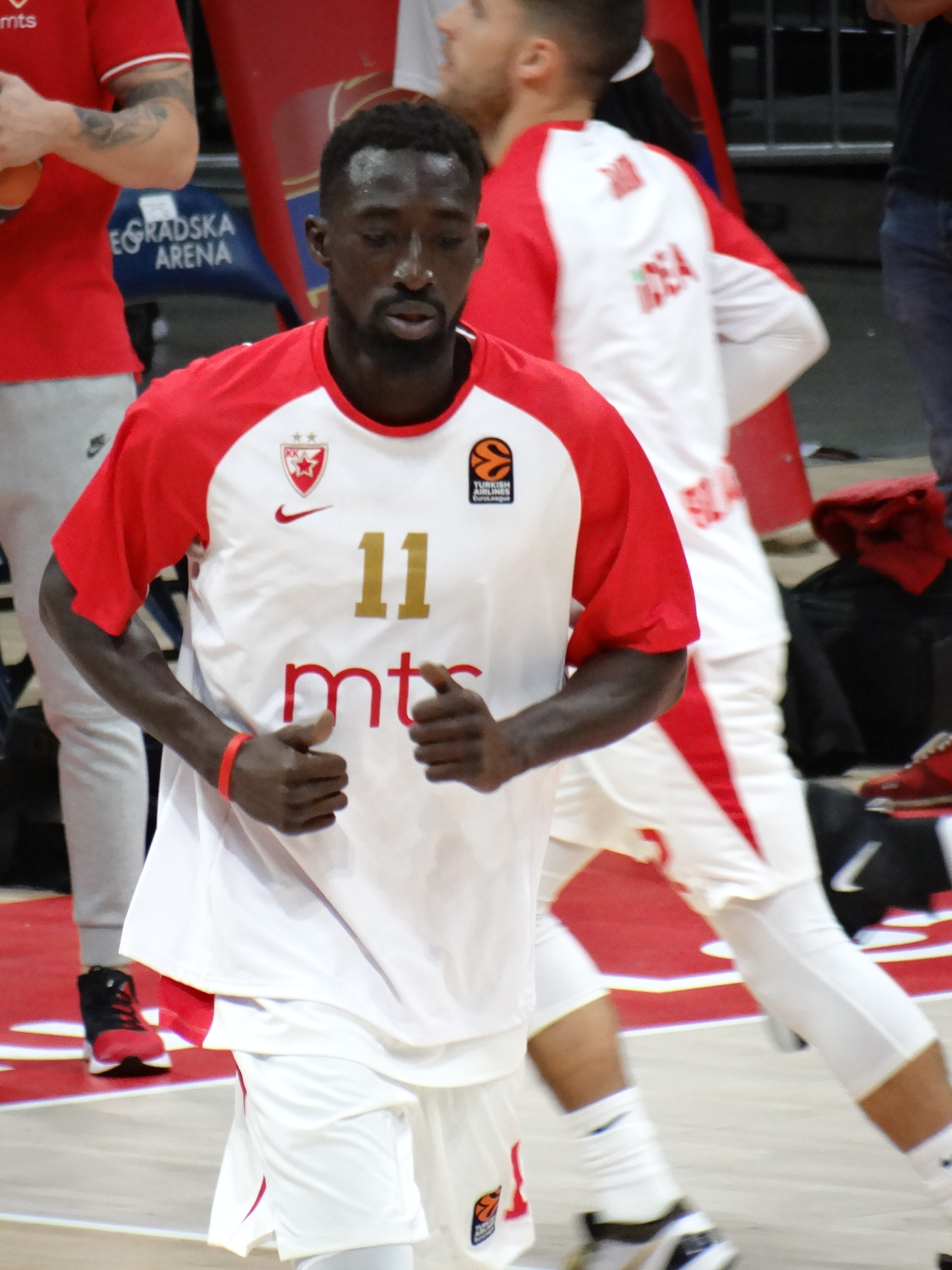
- Faye with Crvena zvezda in 2019

No. 21 – Al Rayyan Doha
- Position: Power forward
- League: Qatari Basketball League

Personal information
- Born: September 14, 1985 (age 41) Dakar, Senegal
- Listed height: 6 ft 10 in (2.08 m)
- Listed weight: 216 lb (98 kg)

Career information
- High school: SEED Academy (Dakar, Senegal)
- College: Georgia Tech (2006–2008); SMU (2008–2010)
- NBA draft: 2010: undrafted
- Playing career: 2010–present

Career history
- 2002–2004: Jeanne d'Arc Dakar
- 2004–2005: US Rail
- 2010–2011: Rio Grande Valley Vipers
- 2011–2012: Hyères-Toulon
- 2012–2013: Ikaros Kallitheas
- 2013–2014: Panelefsiniakos
- 2014–2015: Rethymno
- 2015–2016: Varese
- 2016–2017: Promitheas Patras
- 2017: Sagesse
- 2017–2018: Promitheas Patras
- 2018–2020: Crvena zvezda
- 2020: Avtodor
- 2020–2021: Promitheas Patras
- 2021: Boulazac Dordogne
- 2023–present: Al-Rayyan Doha

Career highlights
- Adriatic League champion (2019); Serbian League champion (2019); Adriatic Supercup winner (2018); Adriatic Supercup MVP (2018); All-Greek League Second Team (2017); Greek League rebounding leader (2015); NBA D-League All-Rookie Second Team (2011)
Medals
Men's basketball
Representing Senegal
AfroBasket
Bronze medal – third place	Abidjan 2013
Bronze medal – third place	2017 Tunisia/Senegal

Mouhammad "Mo" Faye (born September 14, 1985) is a Senegalese professional basketball player who plays for Al Rayyan. He also represents the senior Senegalese national team.

== Early life ==
Faye was born to Demba and Mame Youmane Niang Faye. He is the youngest of five children; his oldest brother, Assane Faye, played basketball at the University of New Hampshire. Faye attended SEED Academy in Dakar, Senegal. In 2002, he was a member of the Senegalese under-18 national basketball team, and in 2004 he was a member of the under-20 national team.

== College career ==
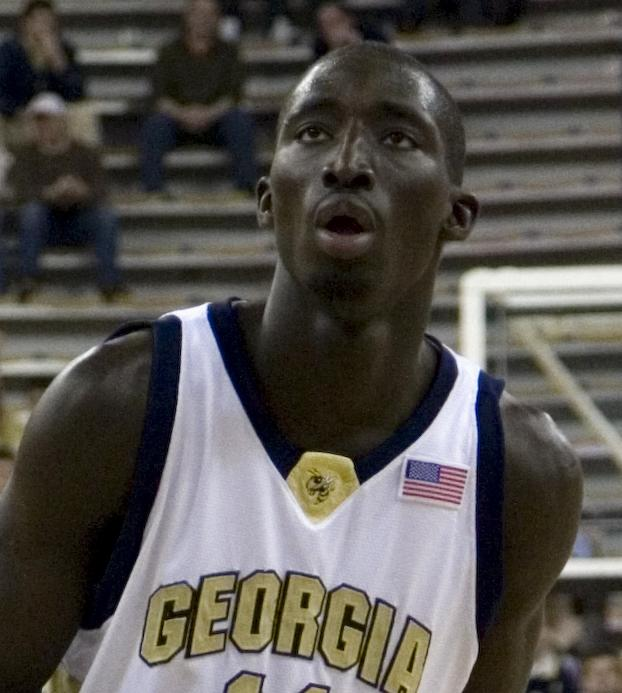
Faye at Georgia Tech in 2006.

Due to a delay in the translation of his transcripts, Faye sat out his first season and was cleared to begin practice with the team in the fall 2006 semester. He started his career as a redshirt freshman in the 2006–07 season, but his initial playing status was in question due to a wrist injury that he sustained in a pickup game over the summer. Faye became a starter when his teammate Lewis Clinch was suspended for the remainder of the 2006–07 season on January 5, 2007. Faye was sidelined again on February 5, 2007, after struggling with flu-like symptoms, which coach Paul Hewitt speculated may have been caused by mononucleosis.

== Professional career ==
Faye played for the Dallas Mavericks in the NBA Summer League in 2010. He later signed with the NBA D-League club Rio Grande Valley Vipers.

After one year in the NBA D-League, he signed with Hyeres-Toulon of the LNB Pro B averaging 12 points and 5 rebounds per game.

For the 2012–13 season, he joined Ikaros Kallitheas of the Greek Basket League, The next year, he joined Panelefsiniakos and for the 2014–15 season he played for Rethymno.

On August 13, 2015, Faye joined Pallacanestro Varese. He left the team before the end of the season, as he was found positive for doping. He was also suspended for six months from basketball. On July 17, 2016, Faye signed with the Greek team Promitheas Patras. On April 24, 2017, Faye signed with the Lebanese team Sagesse.

On August 4, 2018, he moved to Serbia and signed with Crvena zvezda for the 2018–19 season. On June 28, 2019, he re-signed with Crvena zvezda for one more season. On February 7, 2020, Faye and the Serbian club officially parted ways.

On July 17, 2020, Faye officially returned to Greece, once again for Promitheas.

On February 25, 2021, he has signed with Boulazac Basket Dordogne of the LNB Pro A.

On March 1, 2023, Faye was announced by Al-Rayyan Doha of the Qatari Basketball League (QBL).

== National team career ==
Faye has been a long-time member of the senior Senegalese national basketball team. With Senegal, he has played at the following FIBA AfroBasket tournaments: the 2007 FIBA Africa Championship, the 2009 FIBA Africa Championship, the 2011 FIBA Africa Championship, the 2013 FIBA Africa Championship, the 2015 AfroBasket, and the 2017 AfroBasket. He won bronze medals at the 2013 FIBA Africa Championship, and the 2017 AfroBasket.

He also played with Senegal at the 2014 FIBA World Cup, and at the 2019 FIBA World Cup.
