= Nikola Pavlović =

Serbian basketball player

No. 12 – Teodo
- Position: Power forward
- League: Prva A Liga

Personal information
- Born: May 13, 1996 (age 30) Kraljevo, Serbia, FR Yugoslavia
- Listed height: 2.03 m (6 ft 8 in)
- Listed weight: 102 kg (225 lb)

Career information
- NBA draft: 2018: undrafted
- Playing career: 2013–present

Career history
- 2013–2015: Vršac
- 2015–2017: Mega Leks
- 2016–2017: → Smederevo 1953
- 2017–2018: Kragujevački Radnički
- 2018: Vršac
- 2018–2019: Zlatibor
- 2019: Kožuv
- 2019–2021: Zlatibor
- 2021–2022: Ibar
- 2022: KK Teodo Tivat
Medals
Men's basketball
Representing Serbia
U18 European Championship
Silver medal – second place	2014 Turkey	Team
FIBA Europe Under-16 Championship
Bronze medal – third place	2012 Lithuania & Latvia	Team

Nikola Pavlović (Serbian Cyrillic: Никола Павловић, born 13 May 1996) is a Serbian professional basketball player for KK Teodo of the Montenegrin Prva A Liga. He is playing as a power forward.
