= Petar Vorkapić =

Serbian basketball player

Free agent
- Position: Point guard

Personal information
- Born: March 15, 1995 (age 31) Belgrade, Serbia, FR Yugoslavia
- Listed height: 1.93 m (6 ft 4 in)

Career information
- NBA draft: 2017: undrafted
- Playing career: 2013–present

Career history
- 2013–2015: Crvena zvezda
- 2013–2015: → FMP
- 2015–2017: Sloga
- 2017–2018: Kožuv
- 2018–2021: Zlatibor

Petar Vorkapić (Serbian Cyrillic: Петар Воркапић, born 15 March 1995) is a Serbian professional basketball player who last played for Zlatibor of the Basketball League of Serbia.

Petar grew up with Crvena zvezda youth teams and signed his first professional contract in April 2013.
