= Alex Marzette =

American basketball player (born 1993)

Personal information
- Born: March 11, 1993 (age 33) Racine, Wisconsin, U.S.
- Listed height: 1.96 m (6 ft 5 in)
- Listed weight: 84 kg (185 lb)

Career information
- High school: Jerome I. Case (Racine, Wisconsin)
- College: College of Lake County (2011–2012); Volunteer State CC (2012–2013); Southern Indiana (2013–2014); Robert Morris (Illinois) (2014–2015)
- NBA draft: 2015: undrafted
- Playing career: 2015–2020
- Position: Shooting guard

Career history
- 2016–2017: CAB Madeira
- 2017: Joensuun Kataja
- 2017–2018: Mount Gambier Pioneers
- 2018: Wisconsin Herd
- 2018–2019: FMP
- 2019: Novi Pazar
- 2019–2020: EuroNickel 2005

Alexander Derrell Washington Marzette (born March 11, 1993), is an American professional former basketball player Marzette played college basketball for the College of Lake County, the Volunteer State, the Southern Indiana Screaming Eagles, the Robert Morris Eagles.

== College career ==
Marzette received an honorable mention at the end of the 2015 NAIA Division II men's basketball tournament.

== Professional career ==
In December 2018, Marzette joined FMP of the Basketball League of Serbia. He parted ways with FMP in February 2019 and signed with Novi Pazar for the rest of the 2018–19 season. Novi Pazar parted ways with him in March 2019. On June 27, 2019, he signed with Macedonian basketball club EuroNickel 2005.
