= Gerald Beverly =

American basketball player (born 1993)

Free agent
- Position: Center / power forward

Personal information
- Born: November 18, 1993 (age 32) Rochester, New York, U.S.
- Listed height: 6 ft 8 in (2.03 m)
- Listed weight: 235 lb (107 kg)

Career information
- High school: Gates Chili (Rochester, New York)
- College: Daemen (2011–2015)
- NBA draft: 2015: undrafted
- Playing career: 2015–present

Career history
- 2015–2016: Telekom Baskets Bonn
- 2016–2017: Canton Charge
- 2017–2018: Canton Charge
- 2018: Liège Basket
- 2018–2019: Basket Brescia Leonessa
- 2019–2020: APU Udine
- 2020–2022: Rizing Zephyr Fukuoka
- 2022–2023: Iwate Big Bulls
- 2023–2024: Urania Milano
- 2024–2025: Iwate Big Bulls

Career highlights
- 2× ECC Defensive Player of the Year (2014, 2015); 2× First-team All-ECC (2014, 2015)

Gerald Leon Beverly (born November 18, 1993) is an American professional basketball player who last played for Iwate Big Bulls of the Japanese B.League. He played college basketball for the Daemen Wildcats.

== College career ==
Beverly played four seasons at Daemen College. In 120 career games for the Wildcats, he averaged 15.0 points on .667 shooting with 8.4 rebounds in 25.3 minutes per game.

== Professional career ==
After going undrafted in the 2015 NBA draft, Beverly signed with Telekom Baskets Bonn of the Basketball Bundesliga, appearing in eight games for them.

On October 30, Beverly was selected by the Los Angeles D-Fenders in the third round of the 2016 NBA Development League draft, but was waived on November 10. Six days later, he was acquired by the Canton Charge making his debut two days later in a 127–121 loss to the Grand Rapids Drive, recording 10 points, nine rebounds, one steal and two blocks in 25 minutes off the bench.

On August 29, 2017, Beverly signed with the Israeli team Maccabi Rishon LeZion for the 2017–18 season. However, he was later waived by Rishon LeZion on October 2 after appearing in one game.

On March 28, 2018, Liège Basket of the EuroMillions Basketball League announced they had signed Beverly for the remainder of the season.

On July 12, 2018, Beverly signed a deal with the Italian club Basket Brescia Leonessa.

On November 12, 2020, Beverly signed with the Rizing Zephyr Fukuoka of the B2 League.

On June 9, 2021, Beverly re-signed with the Rizing Zephyr Fukuoka of the B2 League.

On May 20, 2022, Beverly signed with the Iwate Big Bulls of the B3 League.

On July 27, 2023, Beverly signed with the Urania Milano of the Serie A2.

On May 22, 2024, Beverly signed with the Iwate Big Bulls of the B3 League. On December 20, his contract was terminated.
