= Tennessee Temple Academy =

Former private school in Tennessee, United States

Coordinates: 35.0337°N 85.2772°W

Tennessee Temple Academy was a K-12 school in Chattanooga, Tennessee, that is operated in association with Tennessee Temple University. In March 2011, the university announced that the school would close at the end of the 2010-2011 school year.

== History ==
Tennessee Temple Academy was established in 1951 as a Southern Baptist elementary school that included kindergarten and grades 1 through 5. It enrolled 132 students that year. High school and middle school programs were added in 1971, and the school achieved its peak enrollment of about 1,000 students in 1980.

The school enjoyed some athletic success in the 2000s, winning three Tennessee Secondary School Athletic Association (TSSAA) boys' basketball championships in a five-period beginning in 2002.

By the 2010-2011 school year, total enrollment had declined to 140 students, with just seven or eight students in some grades. In view of this low enrollment, the school's board of directors voted to cease operations at the end of the school year. The March 2011 announcement of the closure indicated that the school would continue offering an “online academy” and a dual enrollment program under which high school juniors and seniors could enroll in university classes.

== Athletics ==
The school won state championships on boys' basketball in 2002, 2003, and 2007
