= 2017–18 KK Partizan season =

Serbian basketball club season

Partizan NIS Belgrade
2017–18 season
- President: (Serbia) Ostoja Mijailović
- Head coach: (Serbia) Nenad Čanak
- Serbian League: Semi-finals
- ABA League: 5th place
- EuroCup: Regular season
- Radivoj Korać Cup: Winner
- ABA Supercup: 6th place
Home	Away
- All statistics correct as of May 30, 2018.

In the 2017–18 season, Partizan NIS Belgrade competed in the Basketball League of Serbia, the Radivoj Korać Cup, the Adriatic League and the EuroCup.

== Players ==
=== Current roster ===
Note: Flags indicate national team eligibility at FIBA-sanctioned events. Players may hold other non-FIBA nationalities not displayed.

Partizan NIS Belgrade roster
Players
Coaches

Pos.	No.	Nat.	Name	Ht.		Age
PG	3	(United States)	Williams-Goss, Nigel	1.91 m (6 ft 3 in)	88 kg (194 lb)	32 – 16 August 1994
CG	4	(United States)	Vaughn, Kwame	1.91 m (6 ft 3 in)	88 kg (194 lb)	36 – 31 May 1990
F	5	(France)	Sy, Bandja	2.04 m (6 ft 8 in)	97 kg (214 lb)	36 – 30 July 1990
PG	6	(Serbia)	Tadić, Tadija	1.94 m (6 ft 4 in)	87 kg (192 lb)	27 – 22 April 1999
SG	7	(Serbia)	Aranitović, Aleksandar	1.95 m (6 ft 5 in)	91 kg (201 lb)	28 – 24 January 1998
SG	8	(Serbia)	Jovanović, Slobodan	1.93 m (6 ft 4 in)	95 kg (209 lb)	29 – 19 February 1997
SG	9	(Serbia)	Marinković, Vanja	1.98 m (6 ft 6 in)	86 kg (190 lb)	29 – 9 January 1997
SF	10	(Serbia)	Tanasković, Nikola (injured)	2.04 m (6 ft 8 in)	98 kg (216 lb)	28 – 21 October 1997
PF	12	(Serbia)	Veličković, Novica	2.05 m (6 ft 9 in)	109 kg (240 lb)	39 – 5 October 1986
C	14	(Bosnia and Herzegovina)	Tomić, Obrad (injured)	2.08 m (6 ft 10 in)	108 kg (238 lb)	33 – 4 August 1993
F/C	15	(Serbia)	Pecarski, Marko	2.08 m (6 ft 10 in)	98 kg (216 lb)	26 – 12 February 2000
PF	17	(Serbia)	Gavrilović, Strahinja	2.06 m (6 ft 9 in)	104 kg (229 lb)	33 – 5 April 1993
SF	21	(Serbia)	Andrić, Mihajlo	2.00 m (6 ft 7 in)	98 kg (216 lb)	32 – 4 January 1994
SF	24	(Serbia)	Čakarević, Marko	2.00 m (6 ft 7 in)	86 kg (190 lb)	38 – 13 May 1988
C	37	(Ghana)	Brimah, Amida	2.08 m (6 ft 10 in)	104 kg (229 lb)	32 – 11 February 1994
C	41	(Serbia)	Gagić, Đorđe	2.10 m (6 ft 11 in)	114 kg (251 lb)	35 – 28 December 1990
C	95	(Serbia)	Šalić, Đoko	2.10 m (6 ft 11 in)	107 kg (236 lb)	30 – 18 September 1995

Head coach

(Serbia) Nenad Čanak

Assistant coach(es)

- (Serbia) Aleksandar Matović

Strength & conditioning coach(es)

- (Serbia) Adam Petrović

Team manager

- (Serbia) Dušan Kecman

Legend

- (C) Team captain
- Injured

- Roster
Updated: April 14, 2018

=== Depth chart ===
Pos.	Starting 5	Bench 1	Bench 2	Bench 3
C	Đorđe Gagić	Amida Brimah	Đoko Šalić	Obrad Tomić
PF	Novica Veličković	Nikola Tanasković	Strahinja Gavrilović	Marko Pecarski
SF	Bandja Sy	Mihajlo Andrić	Marko Čakarević
SG	Vanja Marinković	Aleksandar Aranitović	Slobodan Jovanović
PG	Nigel Williams-Goss	Kwame Vaughn	Tadija Tadić

=== Players with multiple nationalities ===
- (Serbia) (Bosnia and Herzegovina) Đoko Šalić
- (France) (Mali) Bandja Sy
- (Serbia) (Spain) Marko Pecarski

=== Roster changes ===
==== In ====
No.	Pos.	Nat.	Name	Moving from	Source
14	C	(Bosnia and Herzegovina)	Obrad Tomić	(Bosnia and Herzegovina) Kakanj	
17	PF	(Serbia)	Strahinja Gavrilović	(Serbia) Dynamic Belgrade	
7	SG	(Serbia)	Aleksandar Aranitović	(Serbia) Crvena zvezda	
11	PG	(Australia)	Tom Wilson	(Australia) Melbourne Tigers	
28	SG	(Serbia)	Andreja Stevanović	(Serbia) Dynamic Belgrade	
3	PG	(United States)	Nigel Williams-Goss	(United States) Gonzaga	
6	PG	(Serbia)	Tadija Tadić	From youth team	
24	SF	(Serbia)	Marko Čakarević	(Serbia) Dynamic Belgrade	
2	PG	(United States)	Patrick Miller	(Dominican Republic) Leones de Santo Domingo	
15	PF/C	(Serbia)	Marko Pecarski	(Germany) FC Bayern Munich II	
95	C	(Serbia)	Đoko Šalić	(Montenegro) Sutjeska	
13	C	(Serbia)	Dimitrije Nikolić	(Serbia) KKK Radnički	
23	PF/C	(Jamaica)	Samardo Samuels	(Italy) Enel Brindisi	
	SF	(Serbia)	Đorđe Pažin	(Italy) Stella Azzurra Roma	
41	PF/C	(Serbia)	Đorđe Gagić	(Turkey) Yeşilgiresun Belediye	
4	SF/SG	(United States)	Kwame Vaughn	(Greece) Aris Thessaloniki	
5	SF/PF	(France)	Bandja Sy	(Greece) AEK Athens	
13	C	(Serbia)	Dimitrije Nikolić	(Serbia) Sloga (Loan return)	
37	C	(Ghana)	Amida Brimah	(United States) Austin Spurs	

==== Out ====
No.	Pos.	Nat.	Name	Moving to	Source
44	SG	(United States)	Jamont Gordon	Free agent	
6	PG	(Serbia)	Branislav Ratkovica	(Croatia) Cibona	
13	C	(Serbia)	Đorđe Majstorović	(North Macedonia) MZT Skopje	
15	C	(Serbia)	Miloš Koprivica	(Serbia) Mega Bemax	
55	C	(Serbia)	Uroš Luković	(Montenegro) Mornar Bar	
14	PF	(Serbia)	Stefan Birčević	(Turkey) İstanbul BŞB	
43	PF	(Bosnia and Herzegovina)	Kenan Karahodžić	(Spain) Unicaja Málaga (Loan return)	
7	SF	(Bosnia and Herzegovina)	Adin Vrabac	(Spain) Iberostar Tenerife	
25	PG	(United States)	Will Hatcher	(Italy) Dinamo Sassari	
33	PG	(Serbia)	Stefan Pot	(Serbia) FMP	
10	SF	(Serbia)	Nikola Tanasković	(Serbia) Spartak Subotica (dual registration)	
8	SG	(Serbia)	Slobodan Jovanović	(Serbia) OKK Beograd (dual registration)	
13	C	(Serbia)	Dimitrije Nikolić	(Serbia) KK Sloga (loan)	
23	PF/C	(Jamaica)	Samardo Samuels	(France) Limoges	
28	SG	(Serbia)	Andreja Stevanović	(Serbia) Dynamic Belgrade	
11	PG	(Australia)	Tom Wilson	(Australia) Melbourne Tigers	
2	PG	(United States)	Patrick Miller	(Turkey) Gaziantep	
13	C	(Serbia)	Dimitrije Nikolić	(Serbia) KK Mladost Zemun (loan)	
	SF	(Serbia)	Đorđe Pažin	(Serbia) KK Mladost Zemun (loan)	

== Pre-season and friendlies ==
27 August 2017	Partizan (Serbia)	73–88	(Germany) Oldenburg	Belgrade
18:00 (CEST)	Scoring by quarter: 21–23, 18–20, 18–27, 16–18
	Pts: Andrić 14; Rebs: not available Asts: not available	Boxscore	Pts: Mahalbašić 17; Rebs: not available Asts: not available	Arena: Vizura Sports Center

6 September 2017	Partizan (Serbia)	77–65	(Bosnia and Herzegovina) Igokea	Belgrade
	Scoring by quarter: 23–21, 20–17, 19–11, 15–16
	Pts: Pecarski 19; Rebs: not available Asts: not available	Boxscore	Pts: Šibalić 19; Rebs: not available Asts: not available	Arena: Aleksandar Nikolić Hall

12 September 2017	Partizan (Serbia)	75–97	(Russia) Lokomotiv Kuban	Belgrade
	Scoring by quarter: 20–28, 19–25, 19–20, 17–24
	Pts: Williams-Goss 17; Rebs: not available Asts: Williams-Goss 7	Boxscore	Pts: Ragland 21; Rebs: Qvale 7 Asts: Collins 7	Arena: Mega Factory Hall

13 September 2017	Partizan (Serbia)	84–87	(Belgium) Antwerp	Belgrade
18:30 (CEST)	Scoring by quarter: 19–24, 15–16, 19–22, 31–24
	Pts: Williams-Goss 16; Rebs: Veličković 10; Asts: Williams-Goss 10	Boxscore	Pts: Dudzinski 20; Rebs: not available Asts: Lee 10	Arena: Mega Factory Hall

14 September 2017	Partizan (Serbia)	78–85	(Turkey) Beşiktaş	Belgrade
	Scoring by quarter: 20–21, 25–16, 10–29, 23–19
	Pts: Šalić 17; Rebs: not available Asts: Williams-Goss 6	Boxscore	Pts: Clark 39; Rebs: not available Asts: not available	Arena: Aleksandar Nikolić Hall

22 September 2017	Partizan (Serbia)	68–82	(Turkey) Fenerbahçe Doğuş	Belgrade
18:45 (CEST)	Scoring by quarter: 16–27, 16–10, 21–22, 15–23
Arena Sport	Pts: Marinković 13; Rebs: Čakarević 7 Asts: Miller 5	Boxscore	Pts: Nunnally 18; Rebs: Nunnally 10; Asts: Sloukas 8	Arena: Aleksandar Nikolić Hall; Attendance: 6,000; Referees: Juras, Marko (SRB), Veskovic, Vladimir (SRB), Strika, Marko (SRB)

22 November 2017	Novi Pazar (Serbia)	57–80	(Serbia) Partizan	Novi Pazar
19:00 (CEST)	Scoring by quarter: 9–20, 19–18, 13–17, 19–25
	Pts: Muratović 13; Rebs: not available Asts: not available	Boxscore	Pts: Stevanović 18; Rebs: not available Asts: not available	Arena: Sports Hall Pendik

1 April 2018	Ulcinj (Montenegro)	77–87	(Serbia) Partizan	Ulcinj
19:00 (CEST)	Scoring by quarter: 12–22, 34–21, 18–18, 13–26
	Pts: Bošković, Shepherd 16; Rebs: not available Asts: not available	Boxscore	Pts: Williams-Goss 16; Rebs: not available Asts: not available	Arena: Sports Hall Bratstvo-Jedinstvo; Attendance: 600

3 April 2018	Lovćen (Montenegro)	65–76	(Serbia) Partizan	Cetinje
18:00 (CEST)	Scoring by quarter: 10–20, 25–23, 16–22, 14–11
	Pts: Vrbica 13; Rebs: Vrbica 8 Asts: Vrbica 10	Boxscore	Pts: Sy 14; Rebs: Pecarski 8 Asts: Williams-Goss 7	Arena: Sports Hall Lovćen; Attendance: 2,000

4 April 2018	Sutjeska (Montenegro)	78–75	(Serbia) Partizan	Bar
18:00 (CEST)	Scoring by quarter: 24–15, 15–16, 20–20, 24–19
	Pts: Pavličević 25; Rebs: not available Asts: not available	Boxscore	Pts: Williams-Goss 26; Rebs: not available Asts: not available	Arena: Topolica Sport Hall

6 April 2018	Teodo (Montenegro)	92–90	(Serbia) Partizan	Tivat
19:00 (CEST)	Scoring by quarter: 27–22, 24–23, 25–22, 16–23
	Pts: Abramovič 20; Rebs: Pilčević 4 Asts: Savić 5	Boxscore	Pts: Williams-Goss 20; Rebs: Aranitović, Gagić 5 Asts: Vaughn 4	Arena: Dvorana Župa; Attendance: 1,000

12 April 2018	Partizan (Serbia)	79–85	(Serbia) Mega Bemax	Kragujevac
19:30 (CEST)	Scoring by quarter: 24–20, 11–24, 20–23, 24–18
	Pts: Marinković 21; Rebs: not available Asts: not available	Boxscore	Pts: Kapetanović 14; Rebs: not available Asts: not available	Arena: Jezero Hall

== Competitions ==
	Competition	Position	Record
(Serbia)	Basketball League of Serbia	Semifinals	11–3
(Serbia)	Radivoj Korać Cup	Winners	3–0
(European Union)	Adriatic League	5th place	11–11
(European Union)	ABA Supercup	6th place	1–2
(European Union)	EuroCup	Regular season	1–9

== Adriatic League ==
=== League table ===
Pos	Team	Pld	W	L	PF	PA	PD	Pts	Qualification or relegation
3	(Croatia) Cedevita	22	17	5	1798	1645	+153	39 (Note: Budućnost VOLI 1–1, 1.01; Cedevita 1–1, 0.99)	Advance to the playoffs
4	(Montenegro) Mornar	22	14	8	1825	1790	+35	36	Advance to the playoffs
5	(Serbia) Partizan NIS	22	11	11	1936	1893	+43	33	
6	(Croatia) Zadar	22	10	12	1846	1885	−39	32 (Note: Zadar 1–1, 1.09; Petrol Olimpija 1–1, 0.92)	
7	(Slovenia) Petrol Olimpija	22	10	12	1738	1793	−55	32	

Source: ABA League

=== Matches ===
Win Loss

29 September 2017 1	MZT Skopje (North Macedonia)	92–89	(Serbia) Partizan	Skopje
20:00	Scoring by quarter: 26–25, 16–26, 21–19, 29–22
Arena Sport	Pts: Stojanovski 25; Rebs: Trajkovski 14; Asts: Garcia 9	Boxscore	Pts: Veličković 16; Rebs: Čakarević 7 Asts: Williams-Goss 10	Arena: Jane Sandanski Arena; Attendance: 4,000

4 October 2017 2	Mornar (Montenegro)	82–80	(Serbia) Partizan	Bar
17:00	Scoring by quarter: 36–22, 18–19, 17–16, 12–24
Arena Sport	Pts: Raley-Ross 18; Rebs: Luković, Pavić 7 Asts: Needham 7	Boxscore	Pts: Miller 20; Rebs: Veličković 7 Asts: Miller 4	Arena: Topolica Sport Hall; Attendance: 2,200

7 October 2017 3	Partizan (Serbia)	87–84	(Serbia) FMP	Belgrade
19:00	Scoring by quarter: 28–20, 17–23, 22–17, 20–24
Arena Sport	Pts: Miller 20; Rebs: Čakarević 8 Asts: Williams-Goss 9	Boxscore	Pts: Čović 24; Rebs: Ojo 10; Asts: Čović 10	Arena: Hall Aleksandar Nikolić; Attendance: 3,700

14 October 2017 4	Zadar (Croatia)	97–104	(Serbia) Partizan	Zadar
17:00	Scoring by quarter: 21–26, 27–29, 18–19, 31–30
Arena Sport	Pts: Božić 29; Rebs: Božić 10; Asts: Bašić 5	Boxscore	Pts: Marinković 33; Rebs: Williams-Goss 8 Asts: Williams-Goss 8	Arena: Krešimir Ćosić Hall; Attendance: 6,000

21 October 2017 5	Partizan (Serbia)	117–104	(Bosnia and Herzegovina) Igokea	Belgrade
21:00	Scoring by quarter: 19–23, 31–27, 30–21, 37–33
Arena Sport	Pts: Williams-Goss 30; Rebs: Čakarević 10; Asts: Miller 11	Boxscore	Pts: Wright 34; Rebs: Milošević 8 Asts: Ljubičić 6	Arena: Hall Aleksandar Nikolić; Attendance: 4,000

27 October 2017 6	Cibona (Croatia)	74–90	(Serbia) Partizan	Zagreb
18:00	Scoring by quarter: 16–17, 17–26, 18–24, 23–23
Arena Sport	Pts: Žorić, Young 20; Rebs: Melvin 7 Asts: Young 3	Boxscore	Pts: Williams-Goss 20; Rebs: Samuels 7 Asts: Williams-Goss 13	Arena: Dražen Petrović Basketball Hall; Attendance: 2,850

6 November 2017 7	Partizan (Serbia)	84–100	(Serbia) Crvena zvezda	Belgrade
21:00	Scoring by quarter: 21–26, 21–27, 21–21, 21–26
Arena Sport	Pts: Veličković 18; Rebs: Williams-Goss 5 Asts: Miller 11	Boxscore	Pts: Bjelica 29; Rebs: Antić 8 Asts: Rochestie, Feldine 7	Arena: Hall Aleksandar Nikolić; Attendance: 6,000

11 November 2017 8	Mega Bemax (Serbia)	89–102	(Serbia) Partizan	Sremska Mitrovica
19:00	Scoring by quarter: 23-21, 21–30, 16–22, 29–29
Arena Sport	Pts: Ennis 26; Rebs: Bitadze 10; Asts: Ennis 6	Boxscore	Pts: Williams-Goss 23; Rebs: Veličković 11; Asts: Williams-Goss 10	Arena: Pinki Hall; Attendance: 2,500

18 November 2017 9	Partizan (Serbia)	77–78	(Slovenia) Petrol Olimpija	Belgrade
19:00	Scoring by quarter: 20-9, 25–26, 13–26, 19-17
Arena Sport	Pts: Gavrilović 17; Rebs: Gavrilović 11; Asts: Veličković 6	Boxscore	Pts: Špan 20; Rebs: Hrovat 7 Asts: Oliver 6	Arena: Hall Aleksandar Nikolić; Attendance: 3,800

2 December 2017 10	Budućnost (Montenegro)	86–79	(Serbia) Partizan	Podgorica
19:00	Scoring by quarter: 24–20, 31–23, 16–26, 15–10
Arena Sport	Pts: Gordić 19; Rebs: Landry 7 Asts: Gordić 5	Boxscore	Pts: Miller 22; Rebs: Miller 5 Asts: Miller, Williams-Goss 4	Arena: Morača Sports Center; Attendance: 3,900

9 December 2017 11	Partizan (Serbia)	82–92	(Croatia) Cedevita	Belgrade
19:00	Scoring by quarter: 23–24, 21–20, 12–23, 20–25
Arena Sport	Pts: Williams-Goss 25; Rebs: Čakarević 7 Asts: Miller 6	Boxscore	Pts: Ukić 23; Rebs: Nichols 6 Asts: Ukić 6	Arena: Hall Aleksandar Nikolić; Attendance: 3,850

16 December 2017 12	Partizan (Serbia)	112–94	(North Macedonia) MZT Skopje	Belgrade
19:00	Scoring by quarter: 32–19, 37–23, 19–28, 24-24
Arena Sport	Pts: Andrić 29; Rebs: Williams-Goss, Aranitović, Tanasković, Pecarski 3 Asts: Williams-Goss 11	Boxscore	Pts: Trajkovski 20; Rebs: Lalić 7 Asts: Pavličević, Mavra 4	Arena: Hall Aleksandar Nikolić; Attendance: 2,850

23 December 2017 13	Partizan (Serbia)	93–98	(Montenegro) Mornar	Belgrade
17:00	Scoring by quarter: 25–7, 25–30, 19–31, 24–30
Arena Sport	Pts: Williams-Goss, Miller 16; Rebs: Veličković 6 Asts: Williams-Goss 8	Boxscore	Pts: Raley-Ross 21; Rebs: Luković 8 Asts: Raley-Ross 5	Arena: Hall Aleksandar Nikolić; Attendance: 3,700

30 December 2017 14	FMP (Serbia)	83–71	(Serbia) Partizan	Belgrade
19:00	Scoring by quarter: 17–17, 24–24, 27–21, 15–9
Arena Sport	Pts: Jeremić 14; Rebs: Simanić 7 Asts: Čović 14	Boxscore	Pts: Andrić 16; Rebs: Andrić, Marinković 4 Asts: Williams-Goss, Miller 5	Arena: Železnik Hall; Attendance: 750

4 January 2018 15	Partizan (Serbia)	95–87	(Croatia) Zadar	Belgrade
17:00	Scoring by quarter: 20–18, 18–23, 39–22, 18–24
Arena Sport	Pts: Williams-Goss 22; Rebs: Veličković, Gagić 8 Asts: Williams-Goss 9	Boxscore	Pts: Bostic 27; Rebs: Vuković 6 Asts: Knowles 7	Arena: Hall Aleksandar Nikolić; Attendance: 6,300

14 January 2018 16	Igokea (Bosnia and Herzegovina)	67–74	(Serbia) Partizan	Laktaši
17:00	Scoring by quarter: 15–15, 23–19, 7–22, 22–18
Arena Sport	Pts: Rikić 15; Rebs: Ljubičić 13; Asts: Radivojević 6	Report	Pts: Veličković 25; Rebs: Aranitović 8 Asts: Williams-Goss 6	Arena: Laktaši Sports Hall; Referees: 3,000

20 January 2018 17	Partizan (Serbia)	80–69	(Croatia) Cibona	Belgrade
19:00	Scoring by quarter: 17–17, 23–26, 23–16, 19–10
Arena Sport	Pts: Veličković 23; Rebs: Veličković 12; Asts: Williams-Goss 8	Report	Pts: Tomas 22; Rebs: Žorić 7 Asts: Ratkovica 6	Arena: Hall Aleksandar Nikolić; Attendance: 6,300

29 January 2018 18	Crvena zvezda (Serbia)	86–74	(Serbia) Partizan	Belgrade
21:00	Scoring by quarter: 22–24, 27–19, 22–14, 15–17
Arena Sport	Pts: Dobrić 18; Rebs: Dobrić, Rochestie, Ennis 4 Asts: Rochestie 10	Report	Pts: Veličković 20; Rebs: Veličković 10; Asts: Williams-Goss 5	Arena: Hall Aleksandar Nikolić; Attendance: 5,203

4 February 2018 19	Partizan (Serbia)	89–73	(Serbia) Mega Bemax	Belgrade
19:00	Scoring by quarter: 22–14, 27–17, 22–21, 18–21
Arena Sport	Pts: Williams-Goss, Sy 12; Rebs: Sy 9 Asts: Veličković 7	Report	Pts: Čančar 12; Rebs: Čančar 6 Asts: Jaramaz 6	Arena: Hall Aleksandar Nikolić; Attendance: 6,000

10 February 2018 20	Petrol Olimpija (Slovenia)	89–87(OT)	(Serbia) Partizan	Ljubljana
21:00	Scoring by quarter: 18–23, 18–14, 16–25, 25–15, Overtime: 12–10
Arena Sport	Pts: Hrovat 22; Rebs: Oliver, Morgan 8 Asts: Oliver 6	Report	Pts: Williams-Goss 23; Rebs: Veličković 8 Asts: Williams-Goss 7	Arena: Tivoli Hall; Attendance: 1,500

4 March 2018 21	Partizan (Serbia)	94–83	(Montenegro) Budućnost	Belgrade
19:00	Scoring by quarter: 15–24, 21–26, 31–15, 27–18
Arena Sport	Pts: Veličković 28; Rebs: Sy 11; Asts: Vaughn 9	Report	Pts: Ivanović 11; Rebs: Doellman, Gordić, Šehović 4 Asts: Gordić 6	Arena: Hall Aleksandar Nikolić; Attendance: 4,000

10 March 2018 22	Cedevita (Croatia)	85–75	(Serbia) Partizan	Zagreb
19:00	Scoring by quarter: 20–21, 18–18, 25–19, 22–17
Arena Sport	Pts: Markota 15; Rebs: Nichols 7 Asts: Ukić 8	Report	Pts: Vaughn 20; Rebs: Sy 8 Asts: Aranitović 6	Arena: Dražen Petrović Basketball Hall; Referees: 1,200

== Basketball League of Serbia ==
=== League table (Group B) ===
Pos	Team	Pld	W	L	PF	PA	PD	Pts	Qualification	FMP	PAR	DYN	VRS	VOJ	MET
1	FMP	10	9	1	906	757	+149	19 (Note: FMP 1–1, 1.01; Partizan NIS 1–1, 0.99)	Qualification to the Playoffs	—	87–82	84–71	84–54	94–71	101–74
2	Partizan NIS	10	9	1	942	741	+201	19	Qualification to the Playoffs	94–90	—	87–71	108–66	90–67	91–79
3	Dynamic VIP PAY	10	5	5	836	808	+28	15	Qualification to the Playoffs	70–82	82–93	—	94–74	94–83	84–90
4	Vršac	10	3	7	783	913	−130	13	Qualification to the Playoffs	89–102	59–108	75–90	—	103–85	109–79
5	Vojvodina	10	2	8	773	898	−125	12 (Note: Vojvodina 2–0; Metalac 0–2)		77–81	62–88	66–87	79–84	—	81–76
6	Metalac	10	2	8	810	933	−123	12		75–101	78–101	74–93	84–70	101–102	—

Source: Basketball League of Serbia
Legend: Blue = home team win; Red = away team win.

=== Matches ===
Win Loss

19 April 2018 1	Partizan	90–67	Vojvodina	Belgrade
20:00	Scoring by quarter: 28–10, 21–31, 18–13, 23–13
Arena Sport	Pts: Williams-Goss 16; Rebs: Pecarski 10; Asts: Williams-Goss 9	Boxscore	Pts: Janjić 20; Rebs: Silađi 9 Asts: Stojanović 6	Arena: Hall Aleksandar Nikolić; Attendance: 2,000; Referees: Saša Maričić, Ivan Stefanović, Marko Strika

22 April 2018 2	Partizan	94–90	FMP	Belgrade
21:00	Scoring by quarter: 27–22, 23–27, 19–23, 25–18
Arena Sport	Pts: Williams-Goss, Marinković 26; Rebs: Brimah, Aranitović 6 Asts: Williams-Goss 10	Boxscore	Pts: Nenadić 32; Rebs: Apić 7 Asts: Pot 7	Arena: Hall Aleksandar Nikolić; Attendance: 2,000; Referees: Ilija Belošević, Milija Vojinović, Vladimir Vesković

25 April 2018 3	Dynamic	82–93	Partizan	Belgrade
20:00	Scoring by quarter: 23–29, 17–24, 20–23, 22–17
	Pts: Krstić 19; Rebs: Krstić 6 Asts: Rakićević 6	Boxscore	Pts: Williams-Goss 35; Rebs: Brimah 7 Asts: Williams-Goss 12	Arena: Dynamic Sports Center; Attendance: 500; Referees: Uroš Obrknežević, Uroš Nikolić, Aleksandar Milojević

28 April 2018 4	Partizan	108–66	Vršac	Belgrade
19:00	Scoring by quarter: 25–16, 36–17, 28–23, 19–10
	Pts: Williams-Goss 20; Rebs: Pecarski 13; Asts: Sy 7	Boxscore	Pts: Đerić 14; Rebs: Đorđević 5 Asts: Pašajlić 8	Arena: Hall Aleksandar Nikolić; Attendance: 800; Referees: Saša Maričić, Radoš Arsenijević, Petar Pešić

1 May 2018 5	Partizan	91–79	Metalac	Belgrade
18:30	Scoring by quarter: 24–19, 18–19, 23–28, 26–13
Arena Sport	Pts: Williams-Goss 24; Rebs: Gagić 7 Asts: Williams-Goss 7	Boxscore	Pts: Đukanović 17; Rebs: Narandžić 12; Asts: Vasić 12	Arena: Hall Aleksandar Nikolić; Attendance: 500; Referees: Radoš Arsenijević, Jasmina Juras, Branislav Mrdak

4 May 2018 6	Vojvodina	62–88	Partizan	Novi Sad
18:00	Scoring by quarter: 15–25, 14–20, 17–23, 16–20
Arena Sport	Pts: Bjelica 16; Rebs: Zarić 6 Asts: Bjelica 4	Boxscore	Pts: Williams-Goss, Andrić 16; Rebs: Gagić 11; Asts: Williams-Goss 13	Arena: SPC Vojvodina; Attendance: 2,200; Referees: Milija Vojinović, Uroš Obrknežević, Petar Pešić

7 May 2018 7	FMP	87–82	Partizan	Belgrade
18:00	Scoring by quarter: 25-23, 22-4, 18-21, 22-34
Arena Sport	Pts: Ojo 21; Rebs: Ojo 17; Asts: Pot 6	Boxscore	Pts: Gagić 25; Rebs: Gagić 7 Asts: Williams-Goss 8	Arena: Železnik Hall; Attendance: 500; Referees: Ilija Belošević, Uroš Nikolić, Siniša Prpa

10 May 2018 8	Partizan	87–71	Dynamic	Belgrade
18:00	Scoring by quarter: 27–17, 17-22, 18-22, 25–10
Arena Sport	Pts: Williams-Goss 19; Rebs: Veličković 9 Asts: Williams-Goss 8	Boxscore	Pts: Todorović 18; Rebs: Todorović 6 Asts: Rakićević 7	Arena: Hall Aleksandar Nikolić; Attendance: 500; Referees: Uroš Obrknežević, Siniša Prpa, Duško Sedlar

13 May 2018 9	Vršac	59–108	Partizan	Vršac
20:30	Scoring by quarter: 14-25, 15-21, 12-30, 18-32
Arena Sport	Pts: Đorđević 20; Rebs: Đorđević 10; Asts: Radivojević 3	Boxscore	Pts: Marinković 16; Rebs: Gagić 10; Asts: Williams-Goss 10	Arena: Millennium Centar; Attendance: 3,500; Referees: Saša Maričić, Branislav Mrdak, Ivan Stefanović

16 May 2018 10	Metalac	78–101	Partizan	Valjevo
18:00	Scoring by quarter: 27-28, 19-26, 13-20, 19-27
	Pts: Mikulić 17; Rebs: Kaplanović 12; Asts: Vasić 12	Boxscore	Pts: Marinković 26; Rebs: Marinković 6 Asts: Williams-Goss 4	Arena: Valjevo Sports Hall; Attendance: 1,000; Referees: Ilija Belošević, Vladimir Jevtović, Nemanja Ninković

=== Playoffs ===
Win Loss

22 May 2018 Quarterfinals 1	Partizan	97–68 (Series: 1–0)	Mega Bemax	Belgrade
20:00	Scoring by quarter: 22–20, 22–14, 30–17, 23–17
Arena Sport	Pts: Gagić 16; Rebs: Sy, Veličković 6 Asts: Williams-Goss 8	Boxscore	Pts: Bitadze 17; Rebs: Bitadze 6 Asts: Lazić 4	Arena: Aleksandar Nikolić Hall; Attendance: 3,000; Referees: Ilija Belošević, Uroš Nikolić, Vladimir Jevtović

24 May 2018 Quarterfinals 2	Mega Bemax	79–93 (Series: 0–2)	Partizan	Belgrade
18:00	Scoring by quarter: 26–20, 20–26, 20–24, 13–23
Arena Sport	Pts: Jaramaz 15; Rebs: Jaramaz 6 Asts: Musić 8	Boxscore	Pts: Veličković 22; Rebs: Veličković 7 Asts: Williams-Goss 8	Arena: Mega Factory; Attendance: 650; Referees: Milivoje Jovčić, Saša Maričić, Marko Juras

28 May 2018 Semifinals 1	Crvena zvezda	87–62 (Series: 1–0)	Partizan	Belgrade
18:00	Scoring by quarter: 23–15, 18–18, 20–19, 26–10
Arena Sport	Pts: Rochestie 22; Rebs: Rochestie, Omić 6 Asts: Rochestie 5 PIR: Rochestie 32	Boxscore	Pts: Vaughn 16; Rebs: Veličković 9 Asts: Williams-Goss 7 PIR: Williams-Goss 16	Arena: Aleksandar Nikolić Hall; Attendance: 2,200; Referees: Milivoje Jovčić, Milija Vojinović, Aleksandar Glišić

30 May 2018 Semifinals 2	Partizan	73–81 (Series: 0–2)	Crvena zvezda	Belgrade
20:30	Scoring by quarter: 18–21, 20–16, 24–20, 11–24
Arena Sport	Pts: Williams-Goss 20; Rebs: Veličković, Čakarević 7 Asts: Veličković, Vaughn 4 PIR: Gagić 18	Boxscore	Pts: Rochestie 23; Rebs: Davidovac 9 Asts: Antić 5 PIR: Rochestie 30	Arena: Aleksandar Nikolić Hall; Attendance: 6,500; Referees: Ilija Belošević, Uroš Nikolić, Vladimir Jevtović

== EuroCup ==
=== Regular season ===
==== Group C ====
Pos	Team	Pld	W	L	PF	PA	PD	Qualification
1	(Russia) Lokomotiv Kuban	10	10	0	851	710	+141	Advance to Top 16
2	(Lithuania) Lietuvos rytas	10	6	4	855	796	+59	Advance to Top 16
3	(Germany) Alba Berlin	10	6	4	847	812	+35	Advance to Top 16
4	(France) Limoges CSP	10	5	5	787	804	−17	Advance to Top 16
5	(Spain) RETAbet Bilbao Basket	10	2	8	821	899	−78	
6	(Serbia) Partizan NIS	10	1	9	811	951	−140	

Source: EuroCup Basketball
Rules for classification: All points scored in extra period(s) were not counted in the standings, nor for any tie-break situation.

==== Matches ====
Win Loss

11 October 2017 1	ALBA Berlin (Germany)	111–85	(Serbia) Partizan	Berlin
20:00	Scoring by quarter: 30–21, 27–18, 19–19, 35–27
Sport Klub	Pts: Butterfield 24; Rebs: Grigonis 5 Asts: Sikma 4	Report	Pts: Williams-Goss 22; Rebs: Pecarski 6 Asts: Williams-Goss 5	Arena: Mercedes-Benz Arena; Attendance: 8,043; Referees: Perez Perez, Miguel (ESP), Kowalski, Marcin (POL), Bissang, Joseph (FRA)

18 October 2017 2	Partizan (Serbia)	80–91	(Lithuania) Lietuvos rytas	Belgrade
20:00	Scoring by quarter: 17–15, 26–24, 19–21, 18–31
Sport Klub	Pts: Miller 24; Rebs: Marinković 7 Asts: Williams-Goss 6	Report	Pts: Giedraitis 28; Rebs: Peterson 11; Asts: Jomantas 5	Arena: Hall Aleksandar Nikolić; Attendance: 2,669; Referees: Jimenez, Benjamin (ESP), Romano, David (ISR), Rodsand, Torkild (NOR)

24 October 2017 3	Bilbao Basket (Spain)	92–96	(Serbia) Partizan	Bilbao
20:30	Scoring by quarter: 26–21, 23–21, 19–24, 24–30
Sport Klub	Pts: Hervelle 21; Rebs: Tomàs 7 Asts: Mumbrú, Fischer 5	Report	Pts: Williams-Goss 27; Rebs: Veličković, Williams-Goss 8 Asts: Williams-Goss 3	Arena: Bilbao Arena; Attendance: 4,034; Referees: Papapetrou, Petros (GRE), Reiter, Moritz (GER), Peerandi, Rain (EST)

31 October 2017 4	Limoges CSP (France)	92–83	(Serbia) Partizan	Limoges
20:30	Scoring by quarter: 22–18, 25–23, 24–27, 21–15
Sport Klub	Pts: Bouteille 21; Rebs: Jaiteh 7 Asts: Hayes 9	Report	Pts: Miller 17; Rebs: Marinković 6 Asts: Williams-Goss 8	Arena: Beaublanc; Attendance: 4,573; Referees: Mogulkoc, Emin (TUR), Panther, Anne (GER), Ovinov, Semen (RUS)

8 November 2017 5	Partizan (Serbia)	83–93	(Russia) Lokomotiv Kuban	Belgrade
20:00	Scoring by quarter: 24–21, 15–20, 18–22, 26–30
Sport Klub	Pts: Williams-Goss 18; Rebs: Samuels 11; Asts: Williams-Goss 7	Report	Pts: Ragland 23; Rebs: Lacey 6 Asts: Kulagin 6	Arena: Hall Aleksandar Nikolić; Attendance: 2,406; Referees: Gkontas, Spiros (GRE), Cortes, Carlos (ESP), Rossi, Michele (ITA)

14 November 2017 6	Partizan (Serbia)	80–96	(Germany) ALBA Berlin	Belgrade
20:00	Scoring by quarter: 19–21, 21–33, 18–19, 22–23
Sport Klub	Pts: Marinković 18; Rebs: Veličković, Samuels 7 Asts: Williams-Goss, Miller 6	Report	Pts: Butterfield, Grigonis 20; Rebs: Sikma 7 Asts: Siva 7	Arena: Hall Aleksandar Nikolić; Attendance: 2,784; Referees: Zamojski, Jakub (POL), Balak, Amit (ISR), Rodsand, Torkild (NOR)

5 December 2017 7	Lietuvos rytas (Lithuania)	93–75	(Serbia) Partizan	Vilnius
18:00	Scoring by quarter: 22–19, 25–17, 22–20, 24–19
Sport Klub	Pts: Baron 22; Rebs: Echodas 7 Asts: Kramer 6	Report	Pts: Miller 20; Rebs: Čakarević 5 Asts: Miller 6	Arena: Siemens Arena; Attendance: 5,324; Referees: Pastusiak, Piotr (POL), Papapetrou, Petros (GRE), Geller, Renaud (BEL)

13 December 2017 8	Partizan (Serbia)	67–83	(Spain) Bilbao Basket	Belgrade
20:45	Scoring by quarter: 18–22, 12–16, 19–15, 18–30
Sport Klub	Pts: Williams-Goss 18; Rebs: Williams-Goss 8 Asts: Williams-Goss 5	Report	Pts: Redivo 20; Rebs: Hervelle 9 Asts: Salgado 6	Arena: Hall Aleksandar Nikolić; Attendance: 910; Referees: Shemmesh, Seffi (ISR), Fritz, Clemens (GER), Ovinov, Semen (RUS)

19 December 2017 9	Partizan (Serbia)	98–101	(France) Limoges CSP	Belgrade
20:00	Scoring by quarter: 20–19, 31–23, 25–34, 22–25
Sport Klub	Pts: Williams-Goss 28; Rebs: Tanasković 9 Asts: Williams-Goss 11	Report	Pts: Hayes 22; Rebs: Carter 8 Asts: Joyce 7	Arena: Hall Aleksandar Nikolić; Attendance: 661; Referees: Perez Perez, Miguel (SPA), Mantyla, Petri (FIN), Sukys, Arturas (LTU)

27 December 2017 10	Lokomotiv Kuban (Russia)	99–64	(Serbia) Partizan	Krasnodar
18:00	Scoring by quarter: 22–18, 32–10, 29–18, 16–18
Sport Klub	Pts: Antipov 21; Rebs: Kulagin 6 Asts: Ragland 6	Report	Pts: Marinković 15; Rebs: Šalić 5 Asts: Williams-Goss 6	Arena: Basket-Hall Krasnodar; Attendance: 3,855; Referees: Gkontas, Spiros (GRE), Cortes, Carlos (ESP), Kartal, Ersan (TUR)

== Kup Radivoja Koraća ==
Win Loss

16 February 2018 Quarterfinals	Partizan	67–54	Zlatibor	Niš
19:30 CET	Scoring by quarter: 17-14, 15-16, 21-8, 14–16
Arena Sport	Pts: Gagić, Andrić, Vaughn 10; Rebs: Williams-Goss 5 Asts: Vaughn 4	Report	Pts: Gudžić 14; Rebs: Riznić 7 Asts: Popović, Papić 3	Arena: Čair Sports Center; Attendance: 4,000; Referees: Uroš Nikolić, Jasmina Juras, Marko Pecelj

17 February 2018 Semifinals	Partizan	89–79	Mega Bemax	Niš
21:00 CET	Scoring by quarter: 20–16, 22–25, 26–19, 21–19
Arena Sport	Pts: Marinković 18; Rebs: Gagić 13; Asts: Williams-Goss, Veličković 8	Report	Pts: Čančar 20; Rebs: Bitadze 8 Asts: Rebić 5	Arena: Čair Sports Center; Attendance: 4,500; Referees: Ilija Belošević, Milivoje Jovčić, Marko Juras

18 February 2018 Final	Crvena zvezda	75–81	Partizan	Niš
21:00 CET	Scoring by quarter: 9–25, 22–24, 24–16, 20–16
Arena Sport	Pts: Dangubić, Bjelica 14; Rebs: Bjelica 6 Asts: Dangubić, Lessort 3	Report	Pts: Williams-Goss 23; Rebs: Veličković 7 Asts: Williams-Goss 7	Arena: Čair Sports Center; Attendance: 5,000; Referees: Ilija Belošević, Milivoje Jovčić, Milija Vojinović

== Adriatic Supercup ==
Win Loss

20 September 2017 Quarterfinals	Mornar (Montenegro)	91–77	(Serbia) Partizan	Topolica Sport Hall, Bar
21:15 (CEST)	Scoring by quarter: 26–24, 16–23, 27–17, 22–13
Arena Sport	Pts: Needham 22; Rebs: Shepherd 10; Asts: Needham, Raley-Ross 4	Boxscore	Pts: Marinković 14; Rebs: Pecarski 7 Asts: Williams-Goss, Čakarević 2

21 September 2017 5th–8th place semifinals	Cibona (Croatia)	76–83	(Serbia) Partizan	Topolica Sport Hall, Bar
20:30 (CEST)	Scoring by quarter: 17–18, 23–23, 17–18, 19–24
Arena Sport	Pts: Melvin 25; Rebs: Melvin 17; Asts: Hall 7	Boxscore	Pts: Williams-Goss 30; Rebs: Čakarević 12; Asts: Williams-Goss, Čakarević, Andrić 4

23 September 2017 Fifth place game	Igokea (Bosnia and Herzegovina)	74–64	(Serbia) Partizan	Topolica Sport Hall, Bar
16:30 (CEST)	Scoring by quarter: 18–15, 12–19, 16–15, 28–15
Arena Sport	Pts: Glogovac 20; Rebs: Milošević 8 Asts: Washington, Milošević, Radivojević 3	Boxscore	Pts: Williams-Goss 18; Rebs: Čakarević, Pecarski 6 Asts: Williams-Goss 8

== Individual awards ==
EuroCup

MVP of the Round

- (United States) Nigel Williams-Goss – Regular Season, Round 3

Serbian Superleague

MVP

- (United States) Nigel Williams-Goss

Top Scorer

- (United States) Nigel Williams-Goss

Adriatic League

MVP of the Month

- (United States) Patrick Miller – October 2017
- (Serbia) Novica Veličković – January 2018

MVP of the Round

- (United States) Patrick Miller – Round 5
- (Serbia) Novica Veličković – Round 15
- (Serbia) Novica Veličković – Round 17
- (Serbia) Novica Veličković – Round 21

Ideal Starting Five

- (Serbia) Novica Veličković

Radivoj Korać Cup

MVP

- (United States) Nigel Williams-Goss

Top Scorer

- (United States) Nigel Williams-Goss

== Statistics ==
=== Adriatic League ===
#	Player	GP	MPG	FG%	3FG%	FT%	RPG	APG	SPG	BPG	PPG	EFF
2	(United States) Patrick Miller	14	27.9	59.3	36.4	75.7	2.9	5.4	0.7	0.5	15.3	20.4
3	(United States) Nigel Williams-Goss	20	32.2	51.9	46.2	89.1	3.7	7	1.1	0.4	16.9	20.3
4	(United States) Kwame Vaughn	6	24.7	52.4	11.1	76.9	2.8	4.3	0.7	0.1	11.7	11.7
5	(France) Bandja Sy	6	25	77.8	57.1	75	5.8	0.7	0.7	0.5	9.7	12.3
6	(Serbia) Tadija Tadić	4	2.8	0.0	0.0	0.0	0.3	0.5	0	0	0	0
7	(Serbia) Aleksandar Aranitović	16	18.9	52.4	32.4	90	3	1.4	1.4	0.3	6.1	7.1
9	(Serbia) Vanja Marinković	20	27.8	49.4	36.1	71.4	2.9	1.2	0.8	0.5	11.3	7.9
10	(Serbia) Nikola Tanasković	6	12	71.4	16.7	100	1	0.5	0.7	0.7	3.2	3.8
12	(Serbia) Novica Veličković	21	21.5	54.6	37	78	5.3	2.4	0.7	0.5	12.1	14.9
14	(Bosnia and Herzegovina) Obrad Tomić	5	5	30	0.0	0.0	0.4	0	0	0.4	1.2	-1
15	(Serbia) Marko Pecarski	12	8.3	87	25	80	2.6	0.4	0.2	0.3	4.2	4.4
17	(Serbia) Strahinja Gavrilović	18	13.8	68.5	15.4	84.6	2.6	0.7	0.3	0.3	5.7	5.7
21	(Serbia) Mihajlo Andrić	18	22.6	56.8	41.2	86.7	2.2	1.3	0.8	0.2	9.3	7.7
23	(Jamaica) Samardo Samuels	3	15.7	64.7	40	50	3.6	1	0.3	0.7	10.7	11
24	(Serbia) Marko Čakarević	10	19.9	55.6	25	88.8	5.1	1.5	1.3	0.6	5.6	8.6
28	(Serbia) Andreja Stevanović	6	15.8	41.2	21.4	50	1.8	1.5	0.2	0.2	4.5	2.2
41	(Serbia) Đorđe Gagić	8	20.5	50.9	0.0	77.1	5	1.4	1.1	1.2	10.1	11.6
95	(Serbia) Đoko Šalić	20	15.8	52	0.0	75.5	3	0.5	0.3	0.6	7	6
