= 2018 Basketball League of Serbia playoffs =

2018 Basketball League of Serbia
Tournament details
- Country: Serbia
- Dates: 21 May – 11 June
- Season: 2017–18
- Teams: 8
- Defending champions: Crvena zvezda mts

Final positions
- Champions: Crvena zvezda mts (19th title)
- Runner-up: FMP
- Semifinalists: Partizan NIS; Borac

Tournament statistics
- Matches played: 25
- Scoring leader(s): (Slovenia) Alen Omić

Awards
- Best player: (Slovenia) Alen Omić

The 2018 Basketball League of Serbia playoffs is the play-off tournament that decided the winner of the Basketball League of Serbia for the 2017–18 season. The playoffs started on 21 May and ended on 11 June 2018.

== Qualified teams ==
Pos.	Super League Group A	Super League Group B
1	Crvena zvezda mts	FMP
2	Borac	Partizan NIS
3	Mega Bemax	Dynamic VIP PAY
4	Zlatibor	Vršac

== Bracket ==
Quarterfinals
21–23 May 2018
Crvena zvezda mts	2
Vršac	0
22–24 May 2018
Partizan NIS	2
Mega Bemax	0
22–24 May 2018
FMP	2
Zlatibor	0
21–25 May 2018
Borac	2
Dynamic VIP PAY	1

Semifinals
28–30 May 2018
Crvena zvezda mts	2
Partizan NIS	0
29 May–3 June 2018
FMP	2
Borac	1

Finals
7–11 June 2018
Crvena zvezda mts	3
FMP	0

5th–8th place semifinals
28–30 May 2018
Vršac	0
Mega Bemax	2
29 May–3 June 2018
Zlatibor	1
Dynamic VIP PAY	2

Fifth place game
Did not play
Mega Bemax	–
Dynamic VIP PAY	–
Seventh place game
6–10 June 2018
Vršac	2
Zlatibor	1

== Quarterfinals ==
Team 1	Series	Team 2	Game 1	Game 2	Game 3
Crvena zvezda mts	2–0	Vršac	89–50	109–82	—
Partizan NIS	2–0	Mega Bemax	97–68	93–79	—
FMP	2–0	Zlatibor	102–53	94–87	—
Borac	2–1	Dynamic VIP PAY	83–75	70–81	85–77

=== 1st leg ===
21 May 2018
18:00

Boxscore

Crvena zvezda mts	89–50	Vršac
Scoring by quarter: 21–10, 29–16, 19–13, 20–10
Pts: Feldeine 14; Rebs: Jovanović 8 Asts: Rochestie 8		Pts: Đorđević 13; Rebs: Momirov 10; Asts: Jovović 4
1–0

Aleksandar Nikolić Hall, Belgrade
Attendance: 1,000
Referees: Branislav Mrdak, Ivan Stefanović, Radoš Arsenijević

21 May 2018
19:00

Boxscore

Borac	83–75	Dynamic VIP PAY
Scoring by quarter: 25–19, 15–26, 23–10, 20–20
Pts: Balaban 18; Rebs: Balaban 10; Asts: Đoković 6		Pts: Krstić 18; Rebs: Krstić 9 Asts: Milisavljević 5
1–0

Borac Hall, Čačak
Attendance: 1,500
Referees: Saša Maričić, Aleksandar Glišić, Marko Juras

22 May 2018
18:00

Boxscore

FMP	102–53	Zlatibor
Scoring by quarter: 26–13, 31–14, 27–10, 18–16
Pts: Đoković, Jeremić; Rebs: Nenadić 8 Asts: Nenadić, Pot 8		Pts: Popović 16; Rebs: Riznić 8 Asts: Popović 7
1–0

Železnik Hall, Belgrade
Attendance: 500
Referees: Milivoje Jovčić, Uroš Obrknežević, Nemanja Ninković

22 May 2018
20:00

Boxscore

Partizan NIS	97–68	Mega Bemax
Scoring by quarter: 22–20, 22–14, 30–17, 23–17
Pts: Gagić 22; Rebs: Veličković, Sy 6 Asts: Williams-Goss 8		Pts: Bitadze 17; Rebs: Bitadze 6 Asts: Lazić 4
1–0

Aleksandar Nikolić Hall, Belgrade
Attendance: 3,000
Referees: Ilija Belošević, Uroš Nikolić, Vladimir Jevtović

=== 2nd leg ===
23 May 2018
20:00

Boxscore

Dynamic VIP PAY	81–70	Borac
Scoring by quarter: 19–8, 17–26, 15–22, 30–14
Pts: Stevanović 26; Rebs: Stevanović 6 Asts: Rakićević 7		Pts: Radulović 16; Rebs: Balaban 7 Asts: Radulović 7
1–1

Dynamic Arena, Belgrade
Attendance: 300
Referees: Milija Vojinović, Uroš Obrknežević, Siniša Prpa

23 May 2018
21:00

Boxscore

Vršac	82–109	Crvena zvezda mts
Scoring by quarter: 19–33, 21–28, 21–26, 21–22
Pts: Đorđević 15; Rebs: Momirov 9 Asts: Pašajlić 9		Pts: Omić 21; Rebs: Omić 8 Asts: Čović 5
Crvena zvezda mts wins series, 2–0

Millennium Centar, Vršac
Attendance: 3,000
Referees: Branislav Mrdak, Ivan Stefanović, Radoš Arsenijević

24 May 2018
18:00

Boxscore

Mega Bemax	79–93	Partizan NIS
Scoring by quarter: 26–20, 20–26, 20–24, 13–23
Pts: Jaramaz 15; Rebs: Jaramaz 6 Asts: Musić 8		Pts: Veličković 22; Rebs: Veličković 7 Asts: Williams-Goss 8
Partizan NIS wins series, 2–0

Mega Factory, Belgrade
Attendance: 650
Referees: Milivoje Jovčić, Saša Maričić, Marko Juras

24 May 2018
20:00

Boxscore

Zlatibor	87–94	FMP
Scoring by quarter: 13–22, 30–29, 28–20, 16–23
Pts: Vulić 24; Rebs: Popović 8 Asts: Popović 9		Pts: Nenadić 29; Rebs: three players 6 Asts: Pot 6
FMP wins series, 2–0

WAI TAI - STC Zlatibor, Čajetina
Attendance: 400
Referees: Ilija Belošević, Uroš Nikolić, Vladimir Jevtović

=== 3rd leg ===
25 May 2018
18:00

Boxscore

Borac	85–77	Dynamic VIP PAY
Scoring by quarter: 16–20, 32–15, 19–23, 18–19
Pts: Marinović 22; Rebs: Balaban, Prlja 6 Asts: Radulović 5		Pts: Stevanović 23; Rebs: Krstić 8 Asts: Milisavljević 5
Borac wins series, 2–1

Borac Hall, Čačak
Attendance: 1,500
Referees: Ilija Belošević, Uroš Nikolić, Vladimir Jevtović

== 5th–8th place semifinals ==
Team 1	Series	Team 2	Game 1	Game 2	Game 3
Mega Bemax	2–0	Vršac	94–76	83–61	—
Dynamic VIP PAY	2–1	Zlatibor	118–76	85–90	90–80

=== 1st leg ===
28 May 2018
20:00

Boxscore

Mega Bemax	94–76	Vršac
Scoring by quarter: 18–17, 30–12, 14–23, 32–24
Pts: Bitadze 22; Rebs: Bitadze 11; Asts: Jaramaz 8		Pts: Momirov, Đorđević 17; Rebs: Momirov 9 Asts: Jovović 6
1–0

Mega Factory, Belgrade
Attendance: 500
Referees: Saša Maričić, Branislav Mrdak, Jasmina Juras

29 May 2018
20:00

Boxscore

Dynamic VIP PAY	118–76	Zlatibor
Scoring by quarter: 29–24, 28–19, 32–21, 29–12
Pts: Radonjić 24; Rebs: Rakićević 10; Asts: Rakićević 7		Pts: Vulić 17; Rebs: Riznić 6 Asts: Popović 11
1–0

Dynamic Arena, Belgrade
Attendance: 100
Referees: Milivoje Jovčić, Uroš Nikolić, Nemanja Ninković

=== 2nd leg ===
30 May 2018
18:00

Boxscore

Vršac	61–83	Mega Bemax
Scoring by quarter: 15–22, 15–20, 16–18, 15–23
Pts: Đorđević 14; Rebs: Pavlović 8 Asts: Jovović 5		Pts: Bitadze 25; Rebs: Fundić 6 Asts: Jaramaz, Mišković 5
Mega Bemax wins series, 2–0

Millennium Centar, Vršac
Attendance: 800
Referees: Marko Juras, Siniša Prpa, Radoš Arsenijević

31 May 2018
20:00

Boxscore

Zlatibor	vs.	Dynamic VIP PAY
Scoring by quarter: 22–12, 23–28, 26–26, 19–19
Pts: Papić 25; Rebs: Popović, Papić 7 Asts: Popović 13		Pts: Radonjić 21; Rebs: Todorović 5 Asts: Radonjić 6
1–1

WAI TAI - STC Zlatibor, Čajetina
Attendance: 300
Referees: Aleksandar Glišić, Uroš Obrknežević, Ivan Stefanović

=== 3rd leg ===
3 June 2018
17:00

Boxscore

Dynamic VIP PAY	90–80	Zlatibor
Scoring by quarter: 20–21, 27–21, 29–22, 14–16
Pts: Krstić 23; Rebs: Krstić, Radonjić 6 Asts: Radonjić 10		Pts: Papić 30; Rebs: Riznić 10; Asts: Popović 10
Dynamic VIP PAY wins series, 2–1

Dynamic Arena, Belgrade
Attendance: 350
Referees: Ilija Belošević, Saša Maričić, Marko Juras

== Seventh place games ==
Team 1	Series	Team 2	Game 1	Game 2	Game 3
Zlatibor	1–2	Vršac	88–78	89–95	87–94

=== 1st leg ===
6 June 2018
20:00

Boxscore

Zlatibor	88–78	Vršac
Scoring by quarter: 23–20, 26–16, 26–19, 13–23
Pts: Papić 22; Rebs: Pantić, Riznić 9 Asts: Popović 8		Pts: Đorđević 20; Rebs: Đorđević 7 Asts: Pašajlić 6
1–0

WAI TAI - STC Zlatibor, Čajetina
Attendance: 300
Referees: Milivoje Jovčić, Uroš Nikolić, Siniša Prpa

=== 2nd leg ===
8 June 2018
18:00

Boxscore

Vršac	95–89	Zlatibor
Scoring by quarter: 21–25, 19–25, 26–21, 29–18
Pts: Pašajlić 30; Rebs: Đorđević, Ostojić 7 Asts: Pašajlić 11		Pts: Popović 25; Rebs: Simović 8 Asts: Popović, Vulić 4
1–1

Millennium Centar, Vršac
Attendance: 800
Referees: Vladimir Jevtović, Nemanja Ninković, Milija Vojinović

=== 3rd leg ===
10 June 2018
18:00

Boxscore

Vršac	94–87	Zlatibor
Scoring by quarter: 21–26, 30–21, 20–23, 23–17
Pts: Pašajlić 30; Rebs: Mitrović, Ostojić 6 Asts: Pašajlić 9		Pts: Papić 25; Rebs: Popović 8 Asts: Popović 14
Vršac wins series, 2–1

Millennium Centar, Vršac
Attendance: 1,000
Referees: Uroš Obrknežević, Ilija Belošević, Branislav Mrdak

== Semifinals ==
Team 1	Series	Team 2	Game 1	Game 2	Game 3
Crvena zvezda mts	2–0	Partizan NIS	87–62	81–73	—
FMP	2–1	Borac	71–69	59–64	77–56

=== 1st leg ===
28 May 2018
18:00

Boxscore

Crvena zvezda mts	87–62	Partizan NIS
Scoring by quarter: 23–15, 18–18, 20–19, 26–10
Pts: Rochestie 22; Rebs: Rochestie, Omić 6 Asts: Rochestie 5		Pts: Vaughn 16; Rebs: Veličković 9 Asts: Williams-Goss 7
1–0

Aleksandar Nikolić Hall, Belgrade
Attendance: 2,200
Referees: Milivoje Jovčić, Milija Vojinović, Aleksandar Glišić

29 May 2018
18:00

Boxscore

FMP	71–69	Borac
Scoring by quarter: 20–14, 14–17, 17–19, 20–19
Pts: Nenadić 22; Rebs: Nenadić 9 Asts: Nenadić 6		Pts: Stojadinović 15; Rebs: Balaban, Todorović 6 Asts: Đoković 6
1–0

Železnik Hall, Belgrade
Attendance: 500
Referees: Ilija Belošević, Uroš Obrknežević, Vladimir Jevtović

=== 2nd leg ===
30 May 2018
20:30

Boxscore

Partizan NIS	73–81	Crvena zvezda mts
Scoring by quarter: 18–21, 20–16, 24–20, 11–24
Pts: Williams-Goss 20; Rebs: Veličković, Čakarević 7 Asts: Vaughn, Veličković 4		Pts: Rochestie 23; Rebs: Davidovac 9 Asts: Antić 6
Crvena zvezda mts wins series, 2–0

Aleksandar Nikolić Hall, Belgrade
Attendance: 6,500
Referees: Ilija Belošević, Uroš Nikolić, Vladimir Jevtović

31 May 2018
18:00

Boxscore

Borac	64–59	FMP
Scoring by quarter: 11–18, 15–17, 15–13, 23–11
Pts: Balaban 14; Rebs: Balaban 9 Asts: Pešaković 6		Pts: Pot 16; Rebs: Ojo 9 Asts: Jeremić 5
1–1

Borac Hall, Čačak
Attendance: 2,000
Referees: Milija Vojinović, Saša Maričić, Marko Juras

=== 3rd leg ===
3 June 2018
18:00

Boxscore

FMP	77–56	Borac
Scoring by quarter: 25–22, 19–19, 14–9, 19–6
Pts: Ojo 22; Rebs: Pot 11; Asts: Nenadić 4		Pts: Đoković, Prlja 10; Rebs: Todorović 6 Asts: Radulović, Marinović 3
FMP wins series, 2–1

Železnik Hall, Belgrade
Attendance: 500
Referees: Milivoje Jovčić, Aleksandar Glišić, Uroš Obrknežević

== Finals ==
Team 1	Series	Team 2	Game 1	Game 2	Game 3	Game 4	Game 5
Crvena zvezda mts	3–0	FMP	84–83	68–62	97–88	—	—

=== 1st leg ===
7 June 2018
20:00

Boxscore

Crvena zvezda mts	84–83	FMP
Scoring by quarter: 24–25, 14–11, 18–25, 28–22
Pts: Omić 22; Rebs: Omić, Lazić 5 Asts: Rochestie 12		Pts: Nenadić 19; Rebs: Pot, Ojo 8 Asts: Pot 10
1–0

Aleksandar Nikolić Hall, Belgrade
Attendance: N/A
Referees: Milija Vojinović, Marko Juras, Saša Maričić

=== 2nd leg ===
9 June 2018
18:00

Boxscore

FMP	62–68	Crvena zvezda mts
Scoring by quarter: 20–10, 14–29, 16–18, 12–11
Pts: Apić 14; Rebs: Simanić 11; Asts: Đoković 6		Pts: Feldeine 24; Rebs: Omić, Čović 7 Asts: Čović 9
0–2

Železnik Hall, Belgrade
Attendance: 1,879
Referees: Milivoje Jovčić, Aleksandar Glišić, Vladimir Jevtović

=== 3rd leg ===
11 June 2018
19:00

Boxscore

Crvena zvezda mts	97–88	FMP
Scoring by quarter: 21–26, 35–21, 21–19, 20–22
Pts: Omić 20; Rebs: Omić 11; Asts: Čović 10		Pts: Đoković 22; Rebs: Nenadić 11; Asts: Đoković 7
Crvena zvezda mts wins series, 3–0

Aleksandar Nikolić Hall, Belgrade
Attendance: 4,102
Referees: Ilija Belošević, Uroš Obrknežević, Uroš Nikolić

== See also ==
- List of current Basketball League of Serbia team rosters
- 2018 ABA League Playoffs

Teams

- 2017–18 KK Crvena zvezda season
- 2017–18 KK Partizan season
