= Aleksandar Radulović =

Aleksandar Radulović may refer to:

- Aleksandar Radulović (basketball, born 1984), Montenegrin basketball player for Kožuv
- Aleksandar Radulović (basketball, born 1988), Serbian basketball player for Borac Čačak
