= 2017–18 Basketball League of Serbia =

Basketball League of Serbia
- Season: 2017–18
- Duration: October 14, 2017 – April 7, 2018 (First League); April 18, 2018 – May 16, 2018 (Super League); May 21, 2018–June 11, 2018 (Playoffs)
- Games played: 261
- Teams: 18
- TV partner(s): Arena Sport

Regular season
- Season MVP: (United States) Nigel Williams-Goss
- Promoted: Sloboda; Novi Pazar
- Relegated: Radnički; Sloga

Finals
- Champions: Crvena zvezda mts (19th title)
- Runners-up: FMP
- Semifinalists: Partizan NIS; Borac
- Finals MVP: (Slovenia) Alen Omić

Statistical leaders
Points	(United States) Nigel Williams-Goss	19.6
Rebounds	(Serbia) Lazar Zoric	7.7
Assists	(United States) Nigel Williams-Goss	8.1
- All statistics correct as of June 4, 2018.

The 2017–18 Basketball League of Serbia (Serbian: 2017–18 Košarkaška liga Srbije) is the 12th season of the Basketball League of Serbia, the highest professional basketball league in Serbia. It is also 74th national championship played by Serbian clubs inclusive of nation's previous incarnations as Yugoslavia and Serbia & Montenegro.

== Teams ==
=== Promotion and relegation ===
Napredak Rubin who competed in the BLS during the last season changed the tier with KKK Radnički. By approval from Basketball Federation of Serbia, Napredak moved to the 3rd-tier First Regional League (West).

Teams promoted from the Second League

- Zlatibor
- Vojvodina

Teams relegated to the Second League

- Smederevo 1953
- Konstantin

=== Venues and locations ===
Location of teams in the 2017–18 season

Team	Home city	Arena	Capacity
Beovuk 72	Belgrade	Mega Factory	700
Borac	Čačak	Borac Hall	2,000
Crvena zvezda mts	Belgrade	Aleksandar Nikolić Hall	5,878
Dunav	Stari Banovci	Park Hall	
Dynamic VIP PAY	Belgrade	Dynamic Arena	500
FMP	Belgrade	Železnik Hall	3,000
Mega Bemax	Sremska Mitrovica	Mega Factory	700
Metalac	Valjevo	Valjevo Sports Hall	1,500
Mladost	Zemun	Vizura Sports Center	1,500
Radnički	Kragujevac	Jezero Hall	3,750
OKK Beograd	Belgrade	SC Šumice	1,300
Partizan NIS	Belgrade	Aleksandar Nikolić Hall	5,878
Sloga	Kraljevo	Kraljevo Sports Hall	3,350
Spartak	Subotica	SC Dudova Šuma	3,000
Tamiš	Pančevo	Strelište Sports Hall	1,100
Vojvodina	Novi Sad	SPC Vojvodina	7,022
Vršac	Vršac	Millennium Center	4,400
Zlatibor	Čajetina	WAI TAI - STC Zlatibor	712

Teams that play in the 2017–18 Adriatic League First Division
Teams that play in the 2017–18 Adriatic League Second Division

=== Personnel and sponsorship ===
Team	Head coach	Captain	Kit manufacturer	Shirt sponsor
Beovuk 72	(Serbia) Slobodan Srezoski	(Serbia) Igor Jevđenić	—	—
Borac	(Serbia) Jovica Arsić	(Serbia) Marko Marinović	—	P.S. Fashion, mts
Crvena zvezda mts	(Serbia) Milenko Topić	(Serbia) Branko Lazić	Nike	mts
Dunav	(Serbia) Mitar Ašćerić	(Serbia) Aleksandar Miljković	Cvetex	Best Shop Group
Dynamic VIP PAY	(Serbia) Miroslav Nikolić	(Serbia) Vuk Vulikić	NAAI	VIP PAY
FMP	(Serbia) Vladimir Jovanović	(Serbia) Radoš Šešlija	Champion	FMP
Mega Bemax	(Serbia) Dejan Milojević	(Montenegro) Ognjen Čarapić	Adidas	Bemax
Metalac	(Serbia) Mihailo Poček	(Serbia) Đukan Đukanović	—	—
Mladost	(Serbia) Branko Maksimović	(Serbia) Veljko Brkić	—	—
Radnički	(Serbia) Bojan Kusmuk	(Serbia) Nikola Vasojević	NAAI	FIAT
OKK Beograd	(Greece) Darko Kostić	—	Adidas	—
Partizan NIS	(Serbia) Nenad Čanak	(Serbia) Novica Veličković	Under Armour	NIS
Sloga	(Serbia) Mihailo Drobnjak	(Serbia) Saša Đorđević	—	—
Spartak	(Serbia) Dragoljub Vidačić	(Serbia) Miloš Nikolić	—	—
Tamiš	(Serbia) Bojan Jovičić	(Serbia) Mladen Vitković	unit-sport	—
Vojvodina	(Serbia) Filip Socek	(Serbia) Teodor Atanasov	Peak	Roda
Vršac	(Serbia) Mihajlo Mitić	—	NAAI	Villager
Zlatibor	(Serbia) Vanja Guša	(Serbia) Vladimir Veličković	Ardu	Dino park

=== Coaching changes ===
Round	Team	Outgoing coach	Date of change	Incoming coach
—	Sloga	(Serbia) Bojan Kusmuk	October 2017	(Serbia) Mihailo Drobnjak
5th	Radnički	(Serbia) Zoran Todorović	8 November 2017	(Serbia) Bojan Kusmuk
ABA	Partizan NIS	(Serbia) Miroslav Nikolić	12–14 December 2017	(Serbia) Nenad Čanak
11th	Spartak	(Serbia) Nenad Čanak	15 December 2017	(Serbia) Dragoljub Vidačić
12th	Dynamic VIP PAY	(Serbia) Oliver Popović	19 December 2017	(Serbia) Miroslav Nikolić
14th	Beovuk 72	(Serbia) Rajko Mirković	14 January 2018	(Serbia) Slobodan Srezoski
15th	Vršac	(Serbia) Vladimir Đokić	20–21 January 2018	(Serbia) Goran Topić
—	Borac	(Serbia) Raško Bojić	9 April 2018	(Serbia) Jovica Arsić
—	Vršac	(Serbia) Goran Topić	April 2018	(Serbia) Mihajlo Mitić
7th	Crvena zvezda mts	(Serbia) Dušan Alimpijević	8 May 2018	(Serbia) Milenko Topić

== First League ==
=== League table ===
Pos	Team	Pld	W	L	PF	PA	PD	Pts	Qualification or relegation
1	Borac	26	20	6	2254	1983	+271	46	Qualification to the Super League
2	Dynamic VIP PAY	26	19	7	2276	2077	+199	45	Qualification to the Super League
3	Vršac	26	17	9	2250	2078	+172	43	Qualification to the Super League
4	Tamiš	26	16	10	2157	1990	+167	42	Qualification to the Super League
5	Metalac	26	16	10	2362	2244	+118	42	Qualification to the Super League
6	Zlatibor	26	16	10	2168	2057	+111	42	Qualification to the Super League
7	Vojvodina	26	14	12	2334	2236	+98	40	Qualification to the Super League
8	Mladost	26	12	14	2186	2218	−32	38	Qualification to the Super League
9	Dunav	26	12	14	2058	2123	−65	38	
10	Beovuk 72	26	11	15	2213	2310	−97	37	
11	Spartak	26	10	16	2036	2203	−167	36	
12	OKK Beograd	26	9	17	1983	2133	−150	35	
13	Radnički	26	7	19	2072	2286	−214	33	Relegation to Second League
14	Sloga	26	3	23	1980	2391	−411	29	Relegation to Second League

Source: Basketball League of Serbia

== Super League ==
=== Qualified teams ===
ABA League First Division	First League
Crvena zvezda mts FMP; Mega Bemax; Partizan NIS	Borac; Dynamic VIP PAY; Metalac; Mladost; Tamiš; Vojvodina; Vršac; Zlatibor

=== Group A ===
Pos	Team	Pld	W	L	PF	PA	PD	Pts	Qualification	CZV	BOR	MEG	ZLA	TAM	MLA
1	Crvena zvezda mts	10	8	2	903	735	+168	18 (Note: Crvena zvezda mts 1–1, 1.02; Borac 1–1, 0.98)	Qualification to the Playoffs	—	84–74	91–64	102–64	94–87	115–64
2	Borac	10	8	2	897	747	+150	18	Qualification to the Playoffs	70–63	—	89–77	109–80	72–62	96–63
3	Mega Bemax	10	6	4	850	809	+41	16	Qualification to the Playoffs	76–74	81–88	—	96–90	86–77	90–92
4	Zlatibor	10	4	6	843	901	−58	14	Qualification to the Playoffs	75–89	102–93	79–82	—	83–98	99–73
5	Tamiš	10	3	7	810	830	−20	13		86–87	69–86	62–73	83–89	—	102–81
6	Mladost	10	1	9	736	1017	−281	11		75–104	66–120	67–125	76–82	79–84	—

Source: Basketball League of Serbia

=== Group B ===
Pos	Team	Pld	W	L	PF	PA	PD	Pts	Qualification	FMP	PAR	DYN	VRS	VOJ	MET
1	FMP	10	9	1	906	757	+149	19 (Note: FMP 1–1, 1.01; Partizan NIS 1–1, 0.99)	Qualification to the Playoffs	—	87–82	84–71	84–54	94–71	101–74
2	Partizan NIS	10	9	1	942	741	+201	19	Qualification to the Playoffs	94–90	—	87–71	108–66	90–67	91–79
3	Dynamic VIP PAY	10	5	5	836	808	+28	15	Qualification to the Playoffs	70–82	82–93	—	94–74	94–83	84–90
4	Vršac	10	3	7	783	913	−130	13	Qualification to the Playoffs	89–102	59–108	75–90	—	103–85	109–79
5	Vojvodina	10	2	8	773	898	−125	12 (Note: Vojvodina 2–0; Metalac 0–2)		77–81	62–88	66–87	79–84	—	81–76
6	Metalac	10	2	8	810	933	−123	12		75–101	78–101	74–93	84–70	101–102	—

Source: Basketball League of Serbia

== Playoffs ==
=== Bracket ===
Quarterfinals
21–23 May 2018
Crvena zvezda mts	2
Vršac	0
22–24 May 2018
Partizan NIS	2
Mega Bemax	0
22–24 May 2018
FMP	2
Zlatibor	0
21–25 May 2018
Borac	2
Dynamic VIP PAY	1

Semifinals
28–30 May 2018
Crvena zvezda mts	2
Partizan NIS	0
29 May–3 June 2018
FMP	2
Borac	1

Finals
7–11 June 2018
Crvena zvezda mts	3
FMP	0

5th–8th place semifinals
28–30 May 2018
Vršac	0
Mega Bemax	2
29 May–3 June 2018
Zlatibor	1
Dynamic VIP PAY	2

Fifth place game
Did not play
Mega Bemax	–
Dynamic VIP PAY	–
Seventh place game
6–10 June 2018
Vršac	2
Zlatibor	1

=== Quarterfinals ===
Team 1	Series	Team 2	Game 1	Game 2	Game 3
Crvena zvezda mts	2–0	Vršac	89–50	109–82	—
Partizan NIS	2–0	Mega Bemax	97–68	93–79	—
FMP	2–0	Zlatibor	102–53	94–87	—
Borac	2–1	Dynamic VIP PAY	83–75	70–81	85–77

=== 5th–8th place semifinals ===
Team 1	Series	Team 2	Game 1	Game 2	Game 3
Mega Bemax	2–0	Vršac	94–76	83–61	—
Dynamic VIP PAY	2–1	Zlatibor	118–76	85–90	90–80

=== Semifinals ===
Team 1	Series	Team 2	Game 1	Game 2	Game 3
Crvena zvezda mts	2–0	Partizan NIS	87–62	81–73	—
FMP	2–1	Borac	71–69	59–64	77–56

=== Seventh place games ===
Team 1	Series	Team 2	Game 1	Game 2	Game 3
Zlatibor	1–2	Vršac	88–78	89–95	87–94

=== Finals ===
Team 1	Series	Team 2	Game 1	Game 2	Game 3	Game 4	Game 5
Crvena zvezda mts	3–0	FMP	84–83	68–62	97–88	—	—

2017–18 Basketball League of Serbia Champions

Crvena zvezda mts
19th Title
MVP (Slovenia) Alen Omić

== Super League final standings ==
Pos	Team	Pld	W	L	PF	PA	PD	Pts	Qualification to Adriatic Leagues
1st place, gold medalist(s)	Crvena zvezda mts	17	15	2	1518	1235	+283	32	Qualified for Adriatic First Division
2nd place, silver medalist(s)	FMP	18	13	5	1542	1335	+207	31	Qualified for Adriatic First Division
3	Partizan NIS	14	11	3	1267	1056	+211	25	Qualified for Adriatic First Division
4	Borac	16	11	5	1324	1187	+137	27	Qualification to Adriatic Second Division
5	Mega Bemax	14	8	6	1174	1136	+38	22	Qualified for Adriatic First Division
6	Dynamic VIP PAY	16	8	8	1362	1292	+70	24	Qualification to Adriatic Second Division
7	Vršac	17	5	12	1319	1552	−233	22	Qualification to Adriatic Second Division
8	Zlatibor	18	6	12	1493	1657	−164	24	
9	Tamiš	10	3	7	810	830	−20	13	
10	Vojvodina	10	2	8	773	898	−125	12 (Note: Vojvodina 2–0; Metalac 0–2)	
11	Metalac	10	2	8	810	933	−123	12	
12	Mladost	10	1	9	736	1017	−281	11	

Source: KLS

== See also ==
- 2017–18 Basketball League of Serbia B
- 2017–18 Radivoj Korać Cup
- 2017–18 ABA League
- 2017–18 First Women's Basketball League of Serbia

Teams

- 2017–18 KK Crvena zvezda season
- 2017–18 KK Partizan season
