= Đoko Šalić =

Serbian basketball player

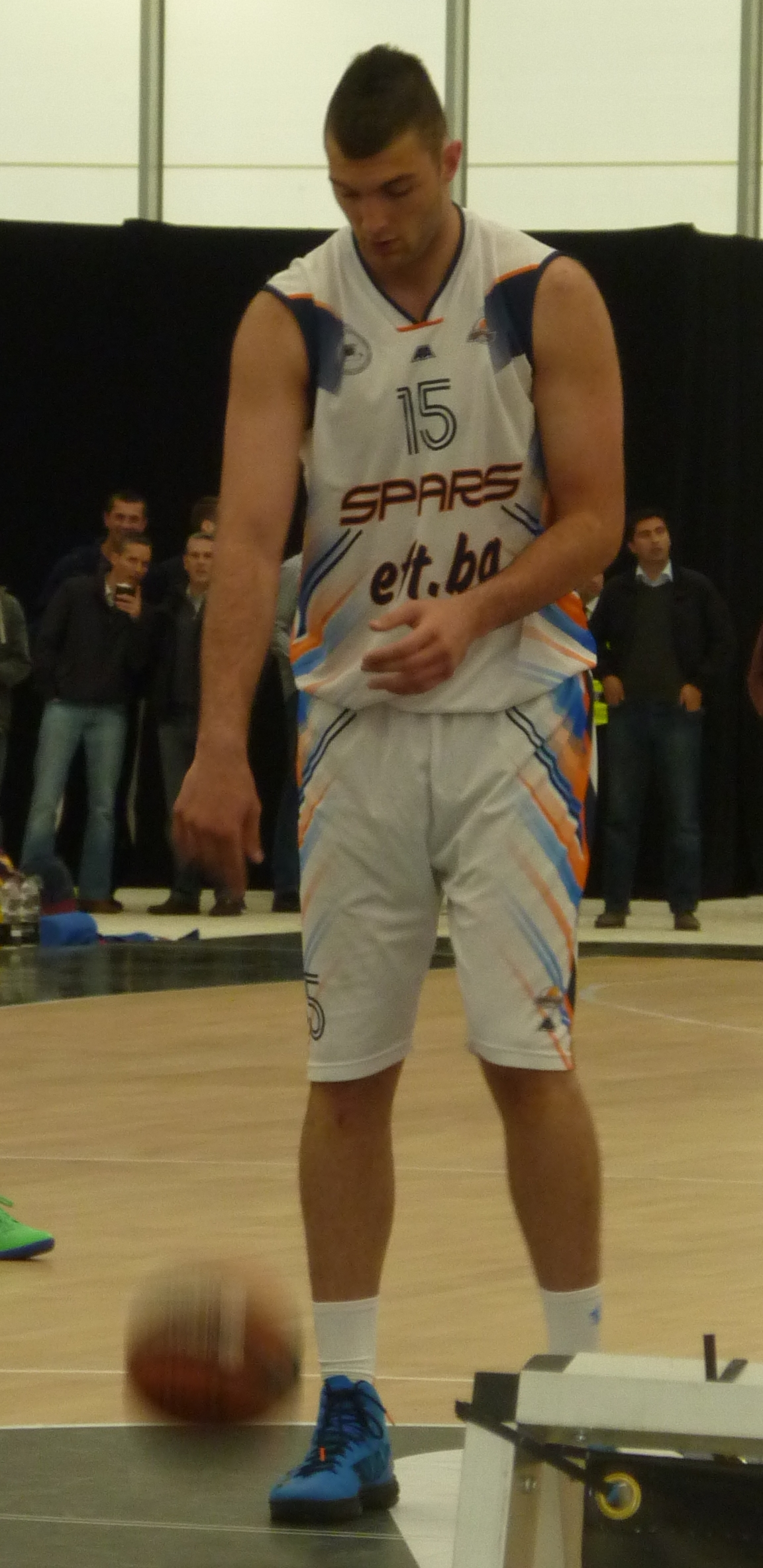
- Šalić with Spars at the 2013 NIJT.

No. 16 – Bosna
- Position: Center
- League: Bosnian League; ABA League

Personal information
- Born: September 18, 1995 (age 31) Sokolac, Bosnia and Herzegovina
- Listed height: 2.10 m (6 ft 11 in)
- Listed weight: 118 kg (260 lb)

Career information
- NBA draft: 2017: undrafted
- Playing career: 2013–present

Career history
- 2013–2014: Partizan
- 2014–2015: Spars Sarajevo
- 2015–2017: Sutjeska
- 2017–2018: Partizan
- 2018–2019: Helios Suns
- 2019: Dynamic
- 2020–2021: Mladost Mrkonjić Grad
- 2021: Wilki Morskie Szczecin
- 2022: Cherkaski Mavpy
- 2022: OKK Sloboda Tuzla
- 2022: Labas Gas Prienai
- 2023: Stade Rochelais
- 2023–2024: Borac Čačak
- 2024–present: Bosna BH Telecom

Career highlights
- Serbian League champion (2014); Serbian Cup winner (2018)
Medals
Men's basketball
Representing Serbia
U20 European Championship
Gold medal – first place	2015 Italy	U-20 Team
Bronze medal – third place	2014 Greece	U-20 Team
U19 World Championship
Silver medal – second place	2013 Czech Republic	U-19 Team
U18 European Championship
Bronze medal – third place	2012 Lithuania/Latvia	U-18 Team

Đoko Šalić (Serbian: Ђоко Шалић, born September 18, 1995) is a Serbian-Bosnian professional basketball player for Bosna of the Bosnian League and the ABA League.

== Professional career ==
Šalić played in youth categories of Spars Sarajevo. In 2013, he signed his first professional contract with Serbian team Partizan Belgrade. In his first season with Partizan, he won the Serbian League defeating Crvena zvezda with 3–1 in the final series. In November 2014, he terminated his contract with Partizan. The next month, he returned to Spars Sarajevo for the rest of the season. In September 2015, he signed with the Montenegrin club Sutjeska.

In April 2019, Šalić signed for Serbian team Dynamic Belgrade. On May 30, he scored 47 points in a 116–113 win over Novi Pazar.

In July 2021, Šalić signed for Wilki Morskie Szczecin of the Polish Basketball League. On 1 January 2022, he was waived. On 3 January, Šalić signed with Cherkaski Mavpy of the Ukrainian Basketball SuperLeague.

In 2022, he played for Labas Gas Prienai of the Lithuanian Basketball League.

== Serbian national team ==
Šalić played for Serbian national team at the 2013 FIBA Under-19 World Championship in Prague and won a silver medal. He averaged 3.4 points and 2.3 rebounds per game.
