= Strahinja Gavrilović =

Serbian basketball player

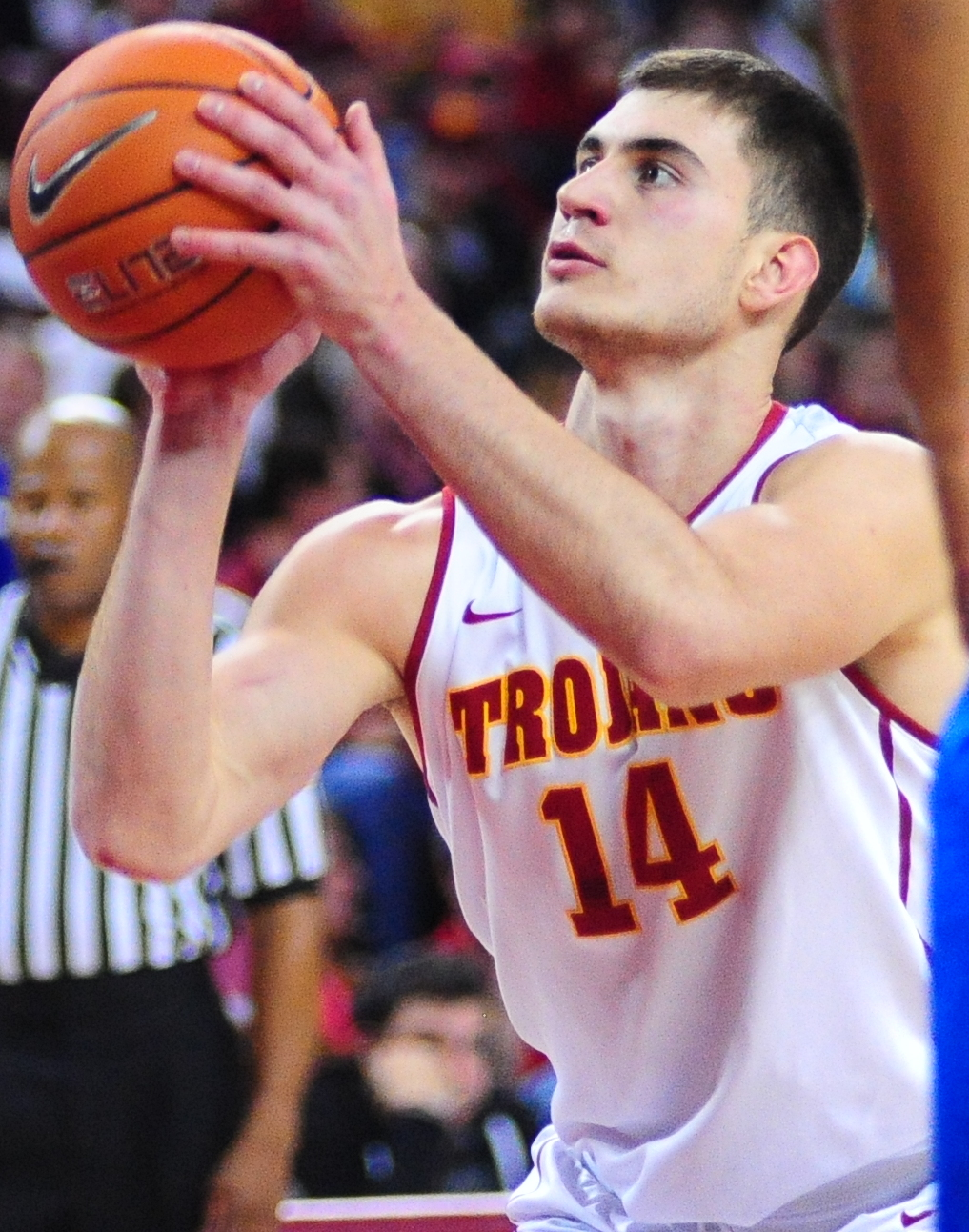
- Gavrilović with USC in 2015

No. 4 – Igokea m:tel
- Position: Power forward
- League: Bosnian League; ABA League

Personal information
- Born: April 5, 1993 (age 33) Kragujevac, Serbia, FR Yugoslavia
- Listed height: 2.06 m (6 ft 9 in)
- Listed weight: 104 kg (229 lb)

Career information
- High school: Rock Academy (San Diego, California)
- College: USC (2012–2016)
- NBA draft: 2016: undrafted
- Playing career: 2016–present

Career history
- 2016–2017: Dynamic
- 2017–2018: Partizan
- 2018–2019: Borac Čačak
- 2019–2020: Río Breogán
- 2020–2021: Real Murcia
- 2021: Mladost Zemun
- 2021–2023: AS Alsace
- 2023–2024: Antibes Sharks
- 2024–present: Igokea

Career highlights
- Bosnian League champion (2025); Serbian Cup winner (2018); Bosnian Cup winner (2025)

Strahinja Gavrilović (born 5 April 1993) is a Serbian professional basketball player for Igokea m:tel of the Bosnian League and the ABA League. He previously played for the USC Trojans.

== Professional career ==
After going undrafted in the 2016 NBA draft, Gavrilović signed a contract with the Serbian club Dynamic Belgrade. He spent one season with them and averaged 9.9 points per game in Basketball League of Serbia.

On August 15, 2017, Gavrilović signed a contract with Partizan. In 2017–18 season, he player 18 ABA League games and averaged 5.7 points and 2.6 rebounds, while shooting 58.2% from the field goal.

On December 25, 2018, he parted ways with Partizan. Two days later he signed a contract with Borac Čačak.

Gavrilović sent the 2020-21 season with Real Murcia of the Spanish LEB Oro. He averaged 9.0 points and 3.6 rebounds per game. On August 30, 2021, Gavrilović signed with Mladost Zemun of the Adriatic League and the Basketball League of Serbia.

== Career achievements and awards ==
- Serbian Cup winner: 1 (with Partizan NIS: 2017–18)
