= Miloš Milisavljević (basketball) =

No. 9 – Vojvodina
- Position: Point guard / shooting guard
- League: Serbian League; ABA League Second Division

Personal information
- Born: September 7, 1993 (age 33) Bačka Topola, Serbia, FR Yugoslavia
- Listed height: 1.93 m (6 ft 4 in)
- Listed weight: 92 kg (203 lb)

Career information
- NBA draft: 2015: undrafted
- Playing career: 2011–present

Career history
- 2011–2014: Spartak Subotica
- 2014–2015: Santa Cruz Warriors
- 2016: ICL Manresa
- 2016: Mega Leks
- 2017–2019: Dynamic Belgrade
- 2019: Naturtex-SZTE-Szedeák
- 2019–2020: KTE-Duna Aszfalt
- 2020–2021: Kaposvári KK
- 2021–2022: Oroszlanyi
- 2022–2025: Spartak Subotica
- 2025–present: Vojvodina

Career highlights
- NBA G League champion (2015)

Miloš Milisavljević (Serbian Cyrillic: Милош Милисављевић; born 7 September 1993) is a Serbian professional basketball player for Vojvodina of the Serbian League (KLS) and the ABA League Second Division.

== Professional career ==
Milisavljević started his senior career with Spartak Subotica. In November 2014, Milisavljević joined the Santa Cruz Warriors of the NBA D-League. On February 12, 2015, he won d league championship that year, but because of injury he played only 24 games.

In January 2016, Milisavljević signed with Spanish club ICL Manresa. After appearing in only four games, he got injured and missed the rest of the season. In June 2016, Milisavljević returned to Serbia and signed with Mega Leks. On 5 January 2017, he left Mega and signed with Dynamic.

In July 2019, Milisavljević signed for Naturtex-SZTE-Szedeák of the Hungarian League.
