= Aleksandar Radulović (basketball, born 1988) =

Serbian basketball player

Žitko Basket
- Position: Point guard
- League: Second Basketball League of Serbia

Personal information
- Born: January 13, 1988 (age 38) Belgrade, SR Serbia, SFR Yugoslavia
- Listed height: 1.90 m (6 ft 3 in)

Career information
- NBA draft: 2010: undrafted
- Playing career: 2005–present

Career history
- 2005–2007: Beovuk
- 2007–2010: Mašinac
- 2010: Crnokosa
- 2010–2011: Ulcinj
- 2011: Sloboda Užice
- 2011–2012: Železničar Inđija
- 2014: Ibar Rožaje
- 2014–2015: Mladost Zemun
- 2015: Plana
- 2015–2017: Dynamic
- 2017–2018: Teodo Tivat
- 2018: Brno
- 2018: Borac Čačak
- 2018: AZS Koszalin
- 2019–2020: Vojvodina
- 2020: Mladost Mrkonjić Grad
- 2020–2021: Dunav
- 2021: Žitko Basket
Medals
Men's basketball
Representing Serbia
U19 World Championship
Gold medal – first place	2007 Serbia	Team

Aleksandar Radulović (born 13 January 1988) is a Serbian professional basketball player.
