= Bojan Kusmuk =

Serbian basketball coach

Personal information
- Born: September 12, 1969 (age 57) Kraljevo, SR Serbia, SFR Yugoslavia
- Listed height: 1.97 m (6 ft 6 in)

Career information
- NBA draft: 1991: undrafted
- Playing career: 1987–2008
- Position: Guard
- Number: 13
- Coaching career: 2008–present

Career history

Coaching
- 2008–2009: BCMUS Argeș Pitești
- 2009–2010: Slavija
- 2010–2011: Sloga
- 2011–2012: Napredak Kruševac
- 2014: Al Ittihad Tripoli
- 2015–2016: Dynamic BG
- 2016: Velika Plana
- 2017: Sloga
- 2017–2018: Kragujevački Radnički
- 2018–2019: Gradina Srebrenik

Bojan Kusmuk (Serbian Cyrillic: Бојан Кусмук; born September 12, 1969) is a Serbian basketball coach and former player.

== Playing career ==
Kusmuk played for Sloga, Swisslion Vršac, Hemofarm, Beobanka, BFC Beočin, Vojvodina, Mašinac of the YUBA League. He also played in Montenegro (Primorka Bar), Israel (Elitzur Givat Shmuel), Belgium (Blue Fox Gent) and Bosnia and Herzegovina. During a stint with BFC Beočin, he played the 1995–96 FIBA Korać Cup season. Over two cup games, he averaged 16.5 points, 2.0 rebounds and 1.0 assists per game.

== Coaching career ==
Kusmuk worked as a head coach for teams such as Sloga, Velika Plana, and Napredak Kruševac. Also, he coached BCMUS Argeș Pitești of the Romanian Liga Națională, Slavija of the Basketball Championship of Bosnia and Herzegovina and the Al Ittihad Tripoli of the Libyan League.

In March 2015, he became the head coach for Dynamic BG of the Second Basketball League of Serbia. He got fired in February 2016.

On November 8, 2017, Kusmuk was named the head coach for Radnički of the Basketball League of Serbia.

On December 15, 2018, Kusmuk became the head coach for Gradina Srebrenik of the Bosnia and Herzegovina Championship. In March 2019, Gradina parted ways with him.
