= Aleksandar Radulović (basketball, born 1984) =

Montenegrin basketball player

Kozuv
- Position: Center
- League: Macedonian League

Personal information
- Born: January 30, 1984 (age 42) Nikšić, SR Montenegro, SFR Yugoslavia
- Listed height: 2.07 m (6 ft 9 in)

Career history
- 2004–2010: KK Danilovgrad
- 2010–2011: KK Ulcinjska Rivijera
- 2011: HKK Zrinjski Mostar
- 2012–2013: Teodo Tivat
- 2013–2014: BC Timișoara
- 2014–2015: Teodo Tivat
- 2015: Soproni KC
- 2016: Kožuv
- 2016: Soproni KC
- 2016–2018: Aurore de Vitre
- 2018–present: Kožuv

Aleksandar Radulović (born January 30, 1984) is a Montenegrin professional basketball center who plays for Kožuv of the Macedonian League.
