= 2017–18 ABA League =

2017–18 ABA League may refer to:

- 2017–18 ABA League First Division
- 2017–18 ABA League Second Division
