= Andreja Stevanović =

Serbian basketball player

No. 25 – Kumanovo
- Position: Guard
- League: Macedonian League

Personal information
- Born: July 9, 1995 (age 31) Kragujevac, Serbia, FR Yugoslavia
- Listed height: 1.89 m (6 ft 2 in)
- Listed weight: 85 kg (187 lb)

Career information
- Playing career: 2013–present

Career history
- 2013–2014: Radnički Kragujevac
- 2014–2015: Napredak Aleksinac
- 2015–2016: Borac Čačak
- 2016–2017: Dynamic
- 2017: Partizan
- 2017–2019: Dynamic
- 2019–2021: Kragujevački Radnički
- 2021–2022: ALM Évreux Basket
- 2022–2023: Lovćen
- 2024: Metalac Farmakom
- 2024–2025: Kožuv
- 2025–present: Kumanovo

Andreja Stevanović (born 9 July 1995) is a Serbian professional basketball player for Kumanovo of the Macedonian League.

== Professional career ==
In August 2017, Stevanović signed with Partizan. On December 21, 2017, the two sides terminated their contract by mutual agreement. In the 2017–18 ABA League season, Stevanović played 8 games for Partizan NIS, averaging 3.4 points. The same day he returned to his former club Dynamic.

Stevanović played for Kragujevački Radnički from 2019 to 2021. During the 2020–21 season, he averaged 23.3 points, 5.4 rebounds, 4.4 assists, and 1.0 steal per game. On October 4, 2021, Stevanović signed with ALM Évreux Basket of the LNB Pro B.
