= Đorđe Milošević =

Serbian basketball player

Personal information
- Born: June 20, 1993 (age 33) Jagodina, FR Yugoslavia
- Listed height: 1.99 m (6 ft 6 in)
- Listed weight: 90 kg (198 lb)

Career information
- Playing career: 2011–present
- Position: Shooting guard / small forward

Career history
- 2011–2014: Hemofarm / Vršac
- 2014–2019: Igokea
- 2019–2020: MZT Skopje
- 2020–2021: Sutjeska
- 2021–2022: Évreux
- 2022–2023: Champagne Basket
- 2024: Borac Banja Luka
- 2024–2025: Alliance Sport Alsace

Career highlights
- 3× Bosnian League champion (2015–2017); 5× Bosnian Cup winner (2015–2019)

Đorđe Milošević (Serbian Cyrillic: Ђорђе Милошевић; born 20 June 1993) is a Serbian professional basketball player who last played for Alliance Sport Alsace of the LNB Pro B.
