= Petar Rakićević =

Serbian basketball player (born 1995)

No. 0 – Nadim Souaid Academy
- Position: Shooting guard / small forward
- League: Lebanese Basketball League

Personal information
- Born: June 4, 1995 (age 31) Prokuplje, FR Yugoslavia
- Listed height: 2.04 m (6 ft 8 in)
- Listed weight: 95 kg (209 lb)

Career information
- NBA draft: 2017: undrafted
- Playing career: 2012–present

Career history
- 2012–2014: Mladost Čačak
- 2014–2016: Metalac
- 2016–2019: Crvena zvezda
- 2017: → FMP
- 2017–2019: →Dynamic
- 2019: Krka
- 2020: Dzūkija Alytus
- 2020–2022: Vojvodina
- 2022–2023: ZTE KK
- 2023–2025: Vojvodina
- 2025–present: Nadim Souaid Academy

Career highlights
- ABA League champion (2017); Serbian League champion (2017); Serbian Cup winner (2017); Serbian League Cup winner (2021)
Medals
Men's basketball
Representing Serbia
U20 European Championship
Gold medal – first place	2015 Italy	Team

Petar Rakićević (Serbian Cyrillic: Петар Ракићевић, born 4 June 1995) is a Serbian professional basketball player for the Nadim Souaid Academy of the Lebanese Basketball League (LBL).

== Playing career ==
Rakićević started his professional basketball career in 2012 with Mladost Čačak where he played for two seasons in the Second Basketball League of Serbia. Prior to the 2014–15 season, he signed for the Metalac Farmakom of the Basketball League of Serbia and the Adriatic League.

On October 5, 2016, Rakićević signed a three-year contract with the Crvena zvezda mts from Belgrade. In August 2017, Rakićević was loaned to FMP for the 2017–18 season. On the start of November 2017, he left FMP after appearing in three ABA League games. He averaged 1 point and 1.6 rebounds per game. On 15 November 2017, he moved to Dynamic VIP PAY for rest of the season.

On 3 October 2019, Rakićević signed for Slovenian team Krka.

== National team career ==
Rakićević was a member of the Serbian U-20 national basketball team that won the gold medal at the 2015 FIBA Europe Under-20 Championship in Italy. Over ten tournament games, he averaged 4.2 points, 3.4 rebounds and 1.6 assists per game.

== Career achievements ==
- Serbian League champion: 1 (with Crvena zvezda: 2016–17)
- Radivoj Korać Cup winner: 1 (with Crvena zvezda: 2016–17)
- Adriatic League champion: 1 (with Crvena zvezda: 2016–17)
- Serbian League Cup winner: 1 (with Vojvodina: 2020–21)
