= Miroslav Pašajlić =

Serbian basketball player

Helios Suns
- Position: Point guard
- League: Slovenian League

Personal information
- Born: February 7, 1995 (age 31) Novi Sad, FR Yugoslavia
- Listed height: 6 ft 3 in (1.91 m)
- Listed weight: 194 lb (88 kg)

Career information
- NBA draft: 2017: undrafted
- Playing career: 2012–present

Career history
- 2012–2013: Vojvodina Srbijagas
- 2013–2015: Sloboda Užice
- 2015–2017: Igokea
- 2017: Bosna Royal
- 2017–2018: Vršac
- 2018–2019: Helios Suns
- 2019: Balkan
- 2019–2020: Dynamic VIP PAY
- 2020–2021: Metalac
- 2021: Dynamic VIP PAY
- 2021–present: Helios Suns

Career highlights
- 2× Bosnian League champion (2016, 2017); 2× Bosnian Cup winner (2016, 2017)
Medals
Men's 3x3 basketball
Representing Serbia
Europe Cup
Gold medal – first place	2021 France

Miroslav Pašajlić (Serbian Cyrillic: Мирослав Пашајлић; born February 7, 1995) is a Serbian professional basketball player for the Helios Suns of the Slovenian League.

== Professional career ==
Pašajlić started his professional career with Vojvodina Srbijagas in 2012 and played one season there. In the summer of 2013, he signed with Sloboda Užice and stayed there for two seasons. On April 23, 2015, it was announced that he would enter the 2015 NBA draft, but the player later withdrew from it.

On August 5, 2015, he signed a three-year contract with the Bosnian team Igokea. He debuted for the team in 67–56 loss to Cedevita Zagreb in Round 1 of the ABA League, scoring 5 points in 12 minutes of action.

On August 17, 2017, he signed with KK Bosna Royal. On December 8, 2017, he left Bosna and signed with Vršac.
