= Dragoslav Papić =

Serbian basketball player

Free agent
- Position: Power forward

Personal information
- Born: March 17, 1987 (age 39) Beograd, SR Serbia, SFR Yugoslavia
- Listed height: 2.04 m (6 ft 8 in)
- Listed weight: 100 kg (220 lb)

Career information
- NBA draft: 2009: undrafted
- Playing career: 2008–present

Career history
- 2008–2009: Rilski Sportist
- 2009–2010: Steaua București
- 2010–2011: AEL Limassol
- 2013: Vršac
- 2014: Crnokosa
- 2016–2017: Kolubara
- 2017–2018: Zlatibor
- 2018–2019: AZS Koszalin
- 2019–2021: Zlatibor

Dragoslav Papić (Serbian Cyrillic: Драгослав Папић, born 17 March 1987) is a Serbian professional basketball player who last played as a Power forward for KK Crvena Zvezda of the Basketball League of Serbia.
