= Stefan Đorđević (basketball, born 1998) =

Serbian basketball player

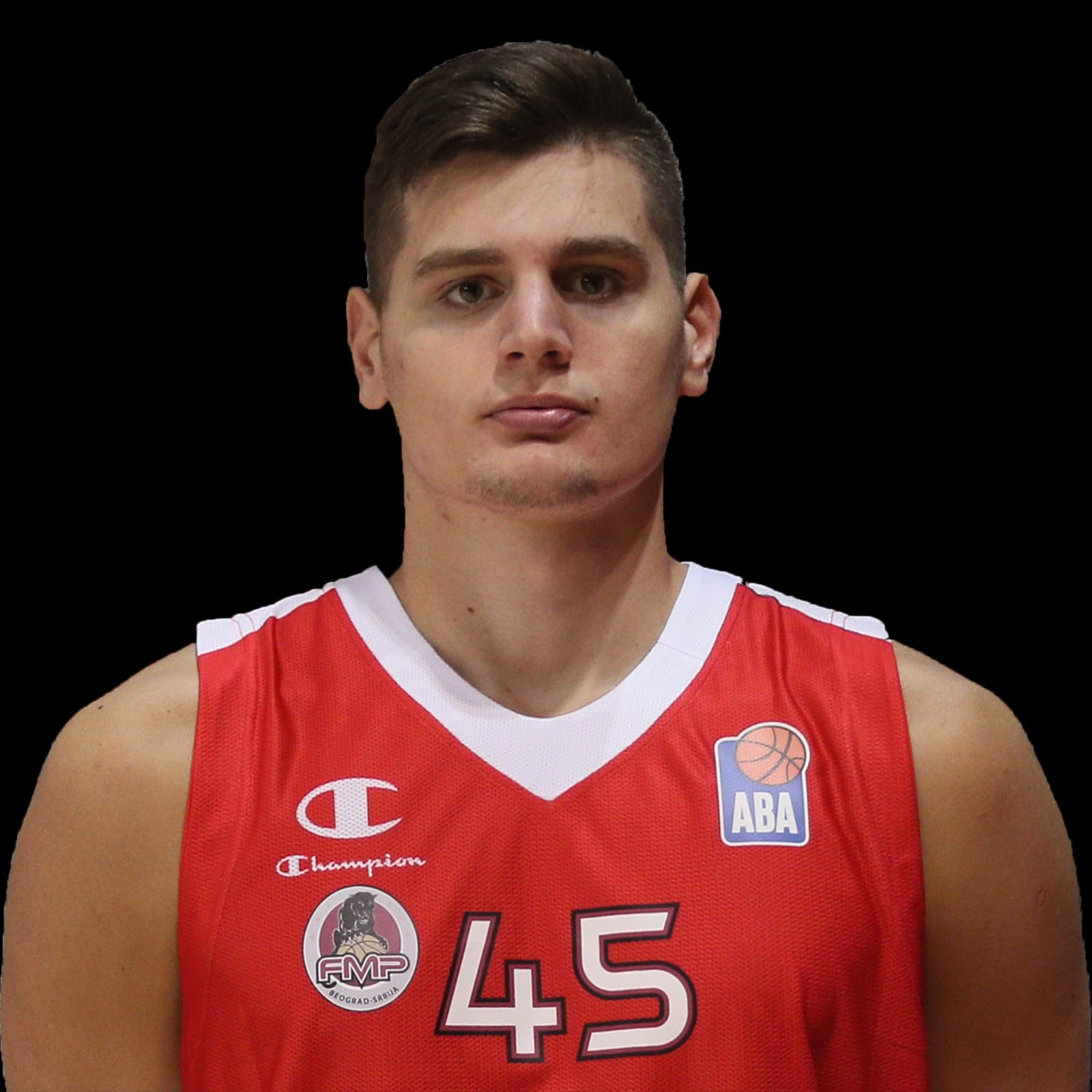
- Đorđević with FMP in 2019

No. 45 – Budućnost
- Position: Power forward
- League: Prva A Liga; ABA League; EuroCup

Personal information
- Born: 4 December 1998 (age 27) Leskovac, Serbia, FR Yugoslavia
- Listed height: 2.06 m (6 ft 9 in)
- Listed weight: 97 kg (214 lb)

Career information
- NBA draft: 2020: undrafted
- Playing career: 2017–present

Career history
- 2017–2021: Crvena zvezda
- 2017: → FMP
- 2018: → Vršac
- 2018–2021: → FMP
- 2021–2023: Igokea
- 2023–2024: Bàsquet Girona
- 2024–2025: Arka Gdynia
- 2025–2026: Śląsk Wrocław
- 2026–present: Budućnost

Career highlights
- PLK rebounding leader (2025); 2× Bosnian League champion (2022, 2023); 2× Bosnian Cup winner (2022, 2023)

Stefan Đorđević (Serbian Cyrillic: Стефан Ђорђевић, born 4 December 1998) is a Serbian professional basketball player for Budućnost Podgorica of the ABA League and the Prva A Liga.

== Early career ==
Đorđević started to play basketball for the youth teams of Crvena zvezda. He played the Euroleague Basketball Next Generation Tournaments for the Crvena zvezda U18 (2015–2017).

== Professional career ==
On 28 December 2016, Đorđević signed a four-year contract with the Crvena zvezda. Prior to the 2017–18 season, he was loaned to the FMP from Belgrade. He appeared in two ABA League First Division games with FMP. On 28 December 2017, he was loaned to the Vršac for the rest of the 2017–18 season.

In June 2021, Đorđević signed for Bosnian club Igokea.

On 4 July 2023, Đorđević signed with Bàsquet Girona of the Spanish Liga ACB.

On 5 August 2024, he signed with Arka Gdynia of the Polish Basketball League (PLK).

On 20 July 2025, he signed with Śląsk Wrocław of the Polish Basketball League (PLK).

On August 9, 2026, he signed with Budućnost Podgorica of the ABA League and the Prva A Liga.

== Personal life ==
On 22 June 2020, Đorđević tested positive for COVID-19.
