= Kwame Vaughn =

American basketball player (born 1990)

No. 8 – PVSK Panthers
- Position: Point guard / shooting guard

Personal information
- Born: May 31, 1990 (age 36) Oakland, California, U.S.
- Listed height: 6 ft 3 in (1.91 m)
- Listed weight: 195 lb (88 kg)

Career information
- High school: Skyline (Oakland, California)
- College: San Francisco (2008–2010); Cal State Fullerton (2011–2013)
- NBA draft: 2013: undrafted
- Playing career: 2013–present

Career history
- 2013–2014: Fortitudo Agrigento
- 2014–2015: Ironi Ramat Gan
- 2015–2016: Antwerp Giants
- 2016: Ironi Nahariya
- 2016: ASVEL Basket
- 2016–2017: Skyliners Frankfurt
- 2017: Aris Thessaloniki
- 2018: Partizan
- 2018–2019: Zadar
- 2019–2020: Al-Ittihad Jeddah
- 2020–2021: Prizreni
- 2021: CSU Ploiești
- 2022: Maccabi Haifa
- 2022–2023: Astana
- 2024: Peja
- 2024–2025: Prizreni
- 2025–present: PVSK Panthers

Career highlights
- Serbian Cup winner (2018); Match des Champions winner (2016); FIBA Europe Cup Starting Five (2016)
- Stats at Basketball Reference

Kwame Donte Vaughn (born May 31, 1990) is an American professional basketball player for PVSK Panthers. He is a 1.91 m (6 ft 3 in) tall point guard-shooting guard. He finished his college basketball career at Cal State Fullerton.

== High school ==
Vaughn attended Skyline High School, in Oakland, California, where he played high school basketball.

== College career ==
Vaughn played NCAA Division I college basketball at the University of San Francisco, with the San Francisco Dons, from 2008 to 2010. He then played college basketball at Cal State Fullerton, with the Cal State Fullerton Titans, from 2011 to 2013.

== Professional career ==
On August 26, 2013, Vaughn signed with Italian Serie A2 club Fortitudo Agrigento for the 2013–14 season. For the 2014–15 season he moved to the Israeli Liga Leumit club Ironi Ramat Gan.

On August 5, 2015, Vaughn signed with Belgian club Antwerp Giants. On April 12, 2016, Antwerp has terminated the deal with Vaughn for disciplinary reasons. Three days later, he signed with Israeli club Ironi Nahariya for the rest of the season.

In July 2016, Vaughn joined the Philadelphia 76ers' summer league squad, for the 2016 NBA Summer League. On July 13, 2016, Vaughn signed with ASVEL Basket of the French LNB Pro A. On October 14, 2016, he moved to the German club Skyliners Frankfurt for the rest of the season.

On September 4, 2017, Vaughn signed a one-year deal with Greek club Aris Thessaloniki. In late November 2017, he was released by Aris. On January 14, 2018, he signed with Serbian club Partizan for the rest of the 2017–18 season. On November 18, 2018, he signed with Croatian club Zadar for the rest of the 2018–19 season. In March 2019, he left Zadar.

In 2021, Vaughn joined CSU Ploiești of the Romanian league, but left the team in November after averaging 15.3 points, 4.0 rebounds, and 3.3 assists per game. On January 11, 2022, Vaughn signed with Maccabi Haifa from the Israeli Basketball National League.

On November 19, 2022, he signed with BC Astana of the Kazakhstan Basketball Championship and the VTB United League.
