= Aleksandar Lazić =

Bosnian basketball player

- Lazić in 2026

No. 8 – Igokea m:tel
- Position: Power forward / small forward
- League: Bosnian League; ABA League

Personal information
- Born: 10 June 1996 (age 30) Milići, Bosnia and Herzegovina
- Listed height: 6 ft 8 in (2.03 m)
- Listed weight: 96 kg (212 lb)

Career information
- Playing career: 2012–present

Career history
- 2012–2015: Olimpija Ljubljana
- 2013–2014: →Slovan
- 2014–2015: →Škofja Loka
- 2016–2017: Dynamic
- 2017–2018: Mega
- 2018–2019: Olimpija Ljubljana
- 2019–2020: Koper Primorska
- 2020–2022: Mornar
- 2022–2023: Budućnost
- 2023–2024: JDA Dijon
- 2024: Spartak Subotica
- 2025: Maristes
- 2026–present: Igokea

Career highlights
- Montenegrin League champion (2023); Slovenian Cup winner (2020); Montenegrin Cup winner (2023); Slovenian Cup MVP (2020)

Aleksandar Lazić (Serbian Cyrillic: Александар Лазић, born 10 June 1996) is a Bosnian professional basketball player for Igokea m:tel of the Bosnian League and the ABA League.

== Playing career ==
Lazić started his senior career in Olimpija in 2012 and then moved to Dynamic in 2016, from where he moved to the Mega Bemax.

On 28 July 2022, Lazić signed for Budućnost VOLI.

On 25 July 2023 he signed with JDA Dijon of the LNB Pro A.

== National team career ==
During the summer of 2017, Lazić played for the Bosnia and Herzegovina national team in pre-qualification for the World Cup.
