= Nigel Williams-Goss =

American basketball player (born 1994)

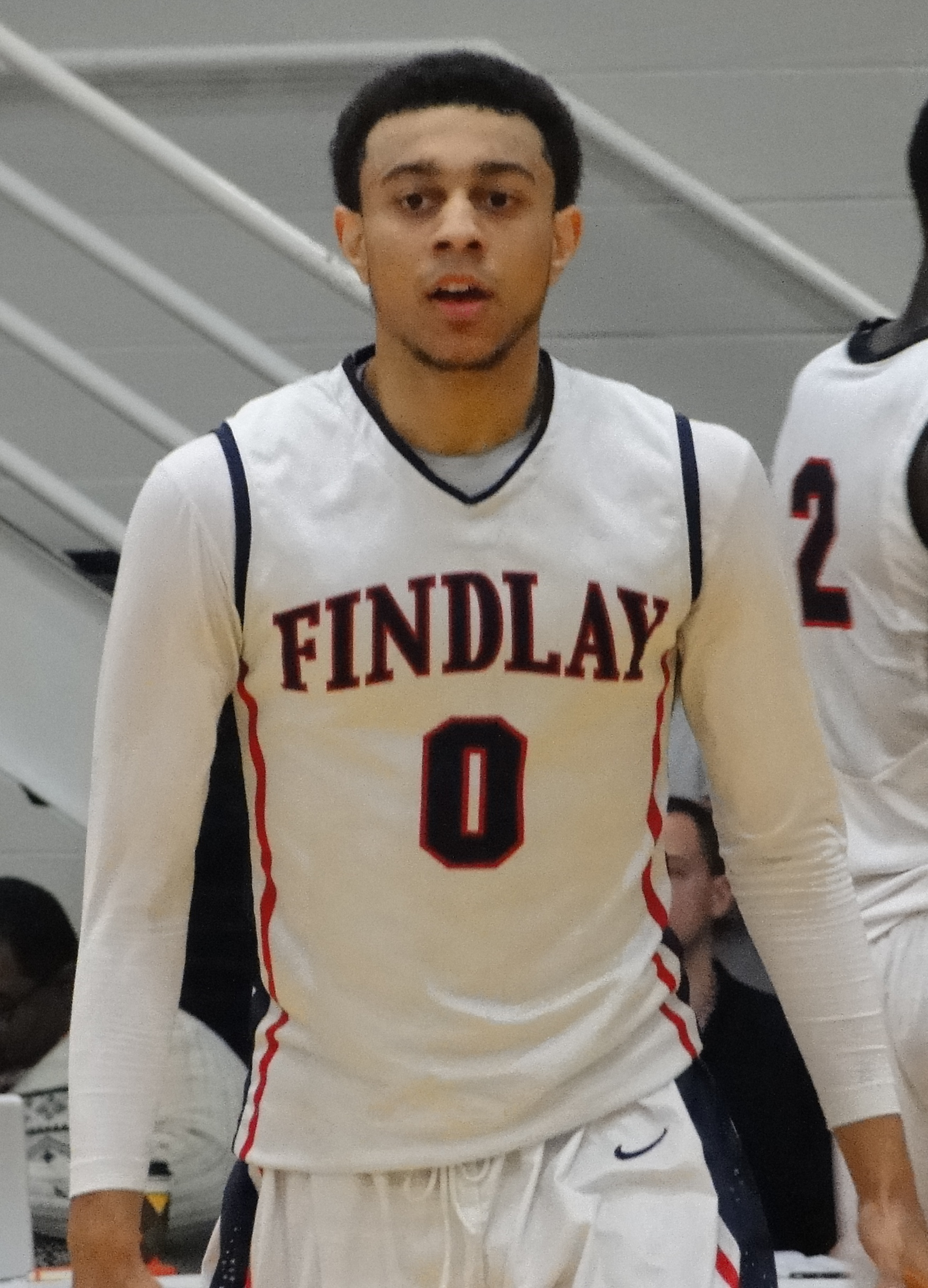
- Williams-Goss with Findlay Prep in 2012

No. 1 – Žalgiris Kaunas
- Position: Point guard
- League: LKL; EuroLeague

Personal information
- Born: September 16, 1994 (age 32) Happy Valley, Oregon, U.S.
- Listed height: 1.91 m (6 ft 3 in)
- Listed weight: 191 lb (87 kg)

Career information
- High school: Findlay Prep (Henderson, Nevada)
- College: Washington (2013–2015); Gonzaga (2016–2017)
- NBA draft: 2017: 2nd round, 55th overall pick
- Drafted by: Utah Jazz
- Playing career: 2017–present

Career history
- 2017–2018: Partizan
- 2018–2019: Olympiacos
- 2019–2020: Utah Jazz
- 2019–2020: →Salt Lake City Stars
- 2021: Lokomotiv Kuban
- 2021–2023: Real Madrid
- 2023–2025: Olympiacos
- 2025–present: Žalgiris Kaunas

Career highlights
- EuroLeague champion (2023); Liga ACB champion (2022); LKL champion (2026); Greek League champion (2025); King Mindaugas Cup winner (2026); Greek Cup winner (2024); Serbian Cup winner (2018); 2× Spanish Supercup winner (2021, 2022); 2× Greek Super Cup winner (2023, 2024); Serbian League MVP (2018); Serbian Cup MVP (2018); Consensus second-team All-American (2017); WCC Player of the Year (2017); First-team All-WCC (2017); WCC Newcomer of the Year (2017); WCC tournament MOP (2017); Second-team All-Pac-12 (2015); Pac-12 All-Freshman Team (2014); McDonald's All-American (2013); First-team Parade All-American (2013)
- Stats at NBA.com
- Stats at Basketball Reference
Medals
Men's basketball
Representing United States
FIBA U19 World Cup
| Gold medal – first place | 2013 Czech Republic | Under-19 |

Nigel Williams-Goss (born September 16, 1994) is an American professional basketball player for Žalgiris Kaunas of the Lithuanian Basketball League (LKL) and the EuroLeague. He was selected by the Utah Jazz, with the 55th overall pick in the 2017 NBA draft. He played college basketball for the Gonzaga Bulldogs. He spent two seasons with the University of Washington's Huskies, before deciding to transfer before the 2015–16 season. At a height of 6 ft 3 in (1.91 m) tall, he plays at the point guard position.

== High school career ==
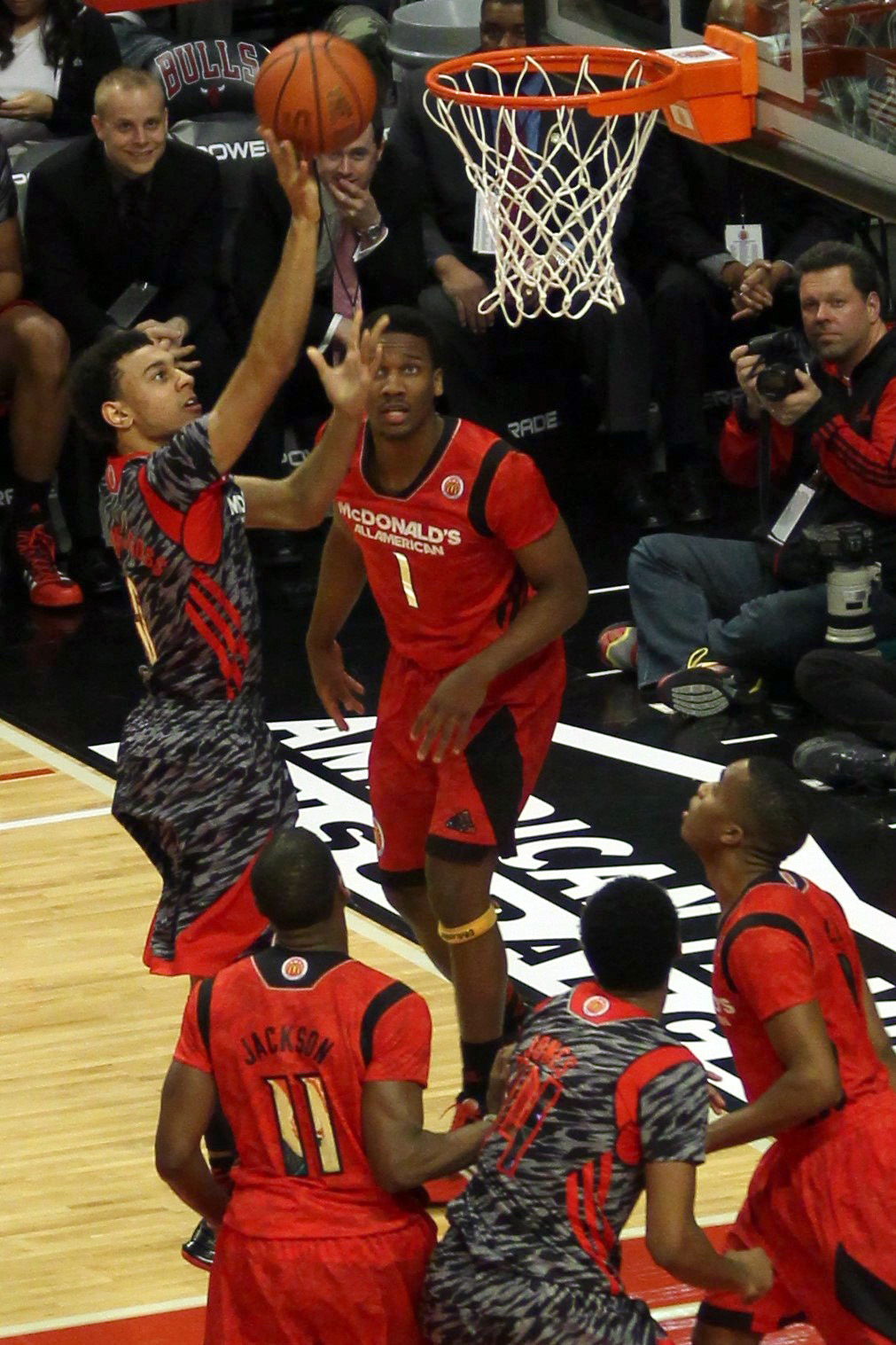
Williams-Goss at the 2013 McDonald's All-American Boys Game

Nigel Williams-Goss played high school basketball at Findlay Prep in Henderson, Nevada and was the program's first 4-year player and helped lead the team to a 124–8 record, including winning the High School National Championship in 2010 and 2012. He maintained a 4.0 GPA throughout his time in high school, while attending classes at Henderson International School.

MaxPreps named Williams-Goss an honorable mention sophomore All-American in 2011. After helping lead Findlay Prep to a High School National Championship, while averaging 15 points, 4.9 assists, and 4 rebounds per game, he was named a third-team junior All-American by MaxPreps in 2012.

As a senior, Williams-Goss averaged more than 18 points and 7 assists per game and was named to MaxPreps' first-team All-American team, after leading Findlay Prep 54 consecutive wins, including a 35–1 record and a trip to the semifinals of the National High School Invitational in the 2012–13 season. He was also named to Parade Magazine's All-America team

Williams-Goss was named as to the prestigious 2013 McDonald's All-American Game Against the best high school seniors in the nation, he scored 10 points along with 6 assists, 2 rebounds, 2 blocks, and a steal, while shooting 4-for-6 from the field and 2-for-2 from the free throw line. He also won the 3-point contest during the McDonald's All-American game festivities. Williams-Goss was also invited to the Jordan Brand Classic, where he led the West team to a 102–98 victory over the East, delivering the game-winning basket, in which he stole the ball and converted a three-point play after sinking a layup and heading to the foul line for an additional point. He finished with 17 points, 4 assists, 3 rebounds, and 1 steal on 5-for-6 from 2-point range, 1–1 from beyond the 3-point arc, and 4-of-5 from the free throw line in 20 minutes of play.

=== Recruiting ===
"He is a great floor general. He is very intelligent and has high, high basketball I.Q. He understands what it takes to win and is a great leader. Guys like him don't come around very often."

— Lorenzo Romar, Washington Head Coach.

In December 2010, after beginning his sophomore year at Findlay Prep, Williams-Goss announced his commitment to UNLV. At the time he was being heavily pursued by the Rebels, along with Arizona, Washington, Oregon, and Oregon State, with increased interest from Georgetown and Connecticut. In April 2011, Lon Kruger jumped ship from the head coaching job at UNLV to become the new head coach at Oklahoma. Two weeks later, Williams-Goss decommitted from UNLV, giving other programs, including the Rebels' coaching staff a chance to court him.

Even though he re-opened his recruitment, Williams-Goss was still interested in attending UNLV and visited there many times, but after his junior year in high school, he planned visits to Harvard, Washington, Oklahoma or Missouri In May 2012, Williams-Goss pledged his commitment to Washington. He signed with the Huskies during the early signing period later that year.

College recruiting
| Name | Hometown | School | Height | Weight | Commit date |
|---|---|---|---|---|---|
| Nigel Williams-Goss; PG | Happy Valley, OR | Findlay Prep | 6 ft 3 in (1.91 m) | 180 lb (82 kg) | May 30, 2012 |
| Nigel Williams-Goss; PG | Recruit ratings: Scout: Rivals: 247Sports: ESPN: (91) | | | | |
Overall recruit ranking: Scout: #50 Rivals: #33 247Sports: #33 ESPN: #19
Note: In many cases, Scout, Rivals, 247Sports, On3, and ESPN may conflict in their listings of height and weight.; In these cases, the average was taken. ESPN grades are on a 100-point scale.; Sources: "2013 Washington Rivals Commits". Rivals.; "2013 Washington Scout Commits". Scout.; "2013 Washington ESPN Commits". ESPN.; "Scout.com Team Recruiting Rankings". Scout.; "2013 Team Ranking". Rivals.; "2013 Washington 24/7 Sports Commits". 247Sports.

== College career ==
=== Freshman year ===
As a freshman, Williams-Goss started every game, while averaging 13.4 points, 4.4 assists, 4.4 rebounds, and 1.1 steals. His stellar season earned him a selection to the All-Pac-12 Freshman Team. He led the Pac-12 conference freshmen in scoring, assists, and assist-to-turnover ratio (1.6). He set a new UW freshman single-season record with 140 assists. Despite his phenomenal year, UW finished with a disappointing 17–15 record (9–9 in Pac-12 games), losing in the first round of the Pac-12 Tournament to Utah, and missed the postseason for the first time since 2007, after declining an invitation to the CBI.

In his first collegiate game, he posted 6 points, 6 assists, 3 rebounds, 3 steals, and a season-best 1 block on 2-for-7 field goal shooting and 2-for-2 from the free throw line in an 88–78 win over inner-city rival Seattle University. On November 17, he had 22 points, 6 rebounds, 5 assists, and a season-high 3 steals on 9-for-15 from the field and 4-for-5 from the charity stripe in a 92–80 win over Eastern Washington. On November 26, he scored 20 points, along with 6 assists and 3 assists on 5-of-8 2-point shooting, 1-of-1 from 3-point, and 7-of-8 free throws in an 83–79 win over Montana. On January 18, 2014, Williams-Goss posted 17 points, 7 rebounds, 6 assists, and 1 steal on 3-for-7 2-pointers, 3-for-5 from 3-point land, and 2-for-3 free throws in a 79–67 loss to Stanford. On January 25, he set a new UW freshman single-game scoring record with 32 points in come-from-behind 87–81 win over Oregon State, in which he shot 7-for-11 from 2-point range, a season-best 3-for-4 from beyond the 3-point line, 9-for-10 from the free throw line, along with 5 rebounds, 3 assists, 1 steal, and zero turnovers. On February 22, Williams-Goss dished out a season-high 10 assists to go along with 14 points, 2 rebounds, and 1 steal on 7-for-10 field goal shooting in an 86–62 win over Oregon State. On February 28, he grabbed a season-high 12 rebounds, along with 17 points, 4 assists, and 2 steals on 6-of-10 2-point field goals, 1-of-2 3-pointers, and 2-of-3 free throws om 30 minutes, in a 72–49 win over cross-state rival Washington State.

=== Sophomore year ===
As a sophomore, he led the 2014–15 Huskies in points (15.6 scoring average) and assists (5.9 per game). He also contributed 4.7 rebounds and 1.1 steals per game, while starting in 30 of the team's 31 games. His standout sophomore season earned him second-team all-conference in the Pac-12. He was also named as a third-team Academic All-American, while boasting a 3.74 cumulative GPA in pre-social science. Washington began the year with an 11–0 record, including impressive wins over Oklahoma and San Diego State, matching the best start in Lorenzo Romar's tenure as the Huskies' coach. Despite such a promising start, Washington would lose 15 of its last 20 games, finishing with a 16–15 record (5–13 in Pac-12 games), losing in the first round of the Pac-12 Tournament to Stanford, and missed the postseason yet again, after declining an invitation to the CBI.

In his first game as a sophomore at Washington on November 14, 2014, Williams-Goss grabbed a career-high 12 rebounds, along with 10 points, 7 assists, 2 steals, and 1 block on 5-of-5 2-point shooting in a 77–59 win over South Carolina State. On November 28, he dished out a career-high 12 assists to go along with 21 points and 7 rebounds on 6-for-14 field goals and 5-for-6 free throws in an 80–70 win over Long Beach State. On January 2, 2015, in an 81–75 loss to Cal, Williams-Goss came the closest to a triple-double in his college career, posting 19 points, 9 assists, and 8 rebounds on 7-for-16 from the field and 5-for-6 from the free throw line. In an 80–77 loss to Washington State on January 10, Williams-Goss dropped 30 points, 7 rebounds, 5 assists, and career-highs of 3 steals and 1 block on 13-for-22 field goals and 4-of-4 from the charity stripe. In a loss to Cal on February 1, he posted a season-high 31 points along with 6 rebounds, 5 assists, 1 steal, and zero turnovers on 8-of-11 2-pointers, 3-for-6 3-point field goals, and 6-of-6 free throws. On February 15, he had 20 points, 6 assists, and 5 rebounds on 6-of-15 within the arc, 1-of-3 beyond the 3-point arc, field goals and 5-of-5 free throws in a loss to Arizona State. In a win over Washington State on February 22, he had 20 points, 7 assists, 3 rebounds, and 2 steals on 6-of-10 2-pointers, 1-for-3 from 3-point land, and 5-of-8 free throws. In the regular season finale against Utah on March 7, Williams-Goss posted 28 points, 6 rebounds, 3 assists, and 2 steals on 10-for-16 2-point field goals, 1-of-2 3-pointers, and 5-for-7 free throws in a 77–68 win over #13 Utah.

=== Junior year ===
"Nigel is a proven high-level player who possesses all of the qualities that we admire here at Gonzaga. He's a very driven, team-oriented guy and is excited to be a part of this program. He's also been great in the classroom as an Academic All-American, which fits in with our history of academic success. We are really excited to get him in here and help him develop the next part of his game."

— Mark Few, Gonzaga Head Coach.

In April 2015, Williams-Goss announced he was leaving Washington and transferring to another school. Even though he had a great relationship with Coach Romar and his teammates, he was uncomfortable with the changes surrounding the program and the team's consistent losing.

He initially claimed he was considering UNLV, Texas, Georgetown, Michigan State, Arkansas, and Gonzaga. A couple days later, he said he would take visits to UNLV, Providence, Texas, and Georgetown, with Michigan State also in the mix. After visiting UNLV and Providence, Williams-Goss cut his list to 4 (UNLV, Providence, Gonzaga, and Ohio State), with plans to visit Gonzaga and Ohio State. He called off his trip to Ohio State after committing to Gonzaga during his recruiting trip. He would have to redshirt the 2015–16 season before having two years of eligibility to play at the beginning of the 2016–17 season. Williams-Goss cited the Zags' track record of developing players during their redshirt year, winning at a high level, and their up-tempo offense which includes a ton of ball screens for his commitment to Gonzaga.

Throughout his junior season, Williams-Goss provided his best season in college with his only season in Gonzaga. In 38 games he played with for Gonzaga, he recorded the most points off of his best overall shooting percentage, rebounds, and steals per game while also playing the fewest minutes per game throughout his college career. In addition to those results, he was also named the West Coast Conference's Newcomer of The Year and the West Coast Conference's Player of The Year, as well as became a member of the All-West Coast Conference First Team, a member of the Academic All-American First Team, and was a consensus All-American Second Team for the help he provided for the 37–2 Gonzaga Bulldogs. Not only that, but he also helped lead Gonzaga to its first ever NCAA Championship match, where they ultimately lost to the North Carolina Tar Heels. After the end of the NCAA Tournament, Williams-Goss was one of a record-high 182 underclassmen to declare for the 2017 NBA draft, with him signing up with an agent on the day of his declaration.

== Professional career ==
=== Partizan Belgrade (2017–2018) ===
On June 23, 2017, Williams-Goss was selected by the Utah Jazz as the 55th pick of the 2017 NBA draft. After playing for the Jazz in the 2017 NBA Summer League, he signed a two-year contract with Serbian club Partizan on August 28, 2017. On February 18, 2018, Williams-Goss recorded 23 points, along with 7 assists, 3 rebounds and 2 steals, and led Partizan to win the Serbian 2018 Radivoj Korać Cup, after an 81–75 win over Crvena zvezda. He was subsequently named the Serbian Cup MVP.

In 46 games played during the 2017–18 season (played in the EuroCup, ABA League, Serbian League, and Serbian Cup competitions), Williams-Goss averaged 17.3 points, 7 assists, 3.4 rebounds and 1.2 steals per game.

=== Olympiacos (2018–2019) ===
On July 5, 2018, Williams-Goss signed a three-year deal with Greek team Olympiacos, of the EuroLeague.

On July 15, 2019, Olympiacos announced that Williams-Goss had exercised his one million dollar buy-out option in order to join the Utah Jazz.

=== Utah Jazz (2019–2020) ===
On July 19, 2019, Williams-Goss signed with the Utah Jazz.

=== Lokomotiv Kuban (2021) ===
On January 5, 2021, Russian club Lokomotiv Kuban announced that they had signed Williams-Goss.

=== Real Madrid (2021–2023) ===
On June 16, 2021, Williams-Goss signed a two-year contract with Spanish Liga ACB and EuroLeague powerhouse Real Madrid. During the 2021–2022 campaign, in 29 EuroLeague games (16 starts), he averaged 5.8 points, 2.1 rebounds and 2.4 assists, playing around 17 minutes per contest. During the 2022–2023 campaign, in 26 EuroLeague games (23 starts), he averaged 7.4 points, 1.3 rebounds and 1.8 assists, playing around 16 minutes per contest.

In the latter season, Williams-Goss became a EuroLeague champion with the historic club. He also won the 2022 Liga ACB championship title, as well as two domestic Supercups. On June 27, 2023, he parted ways with the team.

=== Return to Olympiacos (2023–2025) ===
On June 28, 2023, Williams-Goss made his return to Olympiacos after four seasons, signing a two-year contract. On June 10, 2025, he announced his departure from the club.

=== Žalgiris Kaunas (2025–present) ===
On June 25, 2025, Williams-Goss signed a two–year (2+1) contract with Žalgiris Kaunas of the Lithuanian Basketball League (LKL) and the EuroLeague.

On 25 October 2025, he suffered a hamstring muscle injury resulting in him missing several matches.

== National team career ==
Williams-Goss helped the USA win a gold medal in the 2013 FIBA Under-19 World Cup in the Czech Republic, while averaging 7.9 points, 2.8 rebounds, 2.7 assists, and 0.8 steals, while shooting 49.1 percent from the field, 42.1 percent from beyond the 3-point line, and 90 percent from the free throw line.

== Career statistics ==
Legend
| GP | Games played | GS | Games started | MPG | Minutes per game |
| FG% | Field-goal percentage | 3P% | 3-point field-goal percentage | FT% | Free-throw percentage |
| RPG | Rebounds per game | APG | Assists per game | SPG | Steals per game |
| BPG | Blocks per game | PPG | Points per game | PIR | Performance index rating |
| **Bold** | Career high |

=== NBA ===
==== Regular season ====
| Year | Team | GP | GS | MPG | FG% | 3P% | FT% | RPG | APG | SPG | BPG | PPG |
|---|---|---|---|---|---|---|---|---|---|---|---|---|
| 2019–20 | Utah | 10 | 0 | 5.0 | .313 | .286 | 1.000 | .6 | .6 | .3 | .1 | 1.4 |
| Career | | 10 | 0 | 5.0 | .313 | .286 | 1.000 | .6 | .6 | .3 | .1 | 1.4 |

==== Playoffs ====
| Year | Team | GP | GS | MPG | FG% | 3P% | FT% | RPG | APG | SPG | BPG | PPG |
|---|---|---|---|---|---|---|---|---|---|---|---|---|
| 2020 | Utah | 1 | 0 | 2.4 | — | — | — | — | 1.0 | — | — | 0.0 |
| Career | | 1 | 0 | 2.4 | — | — | — | — | 1.0 | — | — | 0.0 |

=== EuroLeague ===
| † | Denotes seasons in which Williams-Goss won the EuroLeague |

| Year | Team | GP | GS | MPG | FG% | 3P% | FT% | RPG | APG | SPG | BPG | PPG | PIR |
|---|---|---|---|---|---|---|---|---|---|---|---|---|---|
| 2018–19 | Olympiacos | 30 | **24** | **26.3** | .405 | .370 | .827 | 2.0 | **4.2** | .7 | .0 | **9.2** | **8.8** |
| 2021–22 | Real Madrid | 29 | 16 | 16.6 | .395 | .304 | **.857** | 2.1 | 2.4 | .3 | — | 5.8 | 5.6 |
| 2022–23† | Real Madrid | 26 | 23 | 15.8 | **.528** | .385 | .771 | 1.3 | 1.8 | .6 | — | 7.4 | 6.6 |
| 2023–24 | Olympiacos | 32 | 0 | 22.0 | .441 | **.420** | .758 | **2.3** | 3.3 | **1.2** | .0 | 9.1 | 8.3 |
| 2024–25 | Olympiacos | **35** | 20 | 22.5 | .441 | .357 | .828 | 2.1 | 3.4 | .7 | — | 8.6 | 8.6 |
| Career | | 152 | 83 | 20.5 | .439 | .370 | .815 | 2.0 | 3.0 | .7 | .0 | 8.2 | 7.4 |

=== EuroCup ===
| Year | Team | GP | GS | MPG | FG% | 3P% | FT% | RPG | APG | SPG | BPG | PPG | PIR |
|---|---|---|---|---|---|---|---|---|---|---|---|---|---|
| 2017–18 | Partizan | **9** | **9** | **30.2** | .491 | **.500** | **.852** | **2.8** | **6.7** | 1.6 | — | **17.0** | **20.1** |
| 2020–21 | Lokomotiv Kuban | 6 | 5 | 29.2 | **.535** | **.500** | .750 | 2.5 | 5.2 | **2.3** | — | **17.0** | 19.0 |
| Career | | 15 | 14 | 29.8 | .508 | .500 | .809 | 2.7 | 6.1 | 1.9 | — | 17.0 | 19.7 |

=== Domestic leagues ===
| Year | Team | League | GP | MPG | FG% | 3P% | FT% | RPG | APG | SPG | BPG | PPG |
|---|---|---|---|---|---|---|---|---|---|---|---|---|
| 2017–18 | (Serbia) Partizan | KLS | 14 | 29.4 | .541 | .528 | .921 | 3.6 | 8.0 | 1.3 | .1 | 19.6 |
| 2017–18 | (Serbia) Partizan | ABA | 20 | 32.7 | .504 | .462 | .891 | 3.6 | 6.8 | 1.1 | .2 | 16.8 |
| 2018–19 | (Greece) Olympiacos | GBL | 23 | 25.0 | .444 | .400 | .867 | 2.5 | 4.6 | .8 | — | 11.3 |
| 2019–20 | (United States) Salt Lake City Stars | G League | 17 | 29.6 | .508 | .352 | .778 | 3.9 | 5.5 | 1.6 | .1 | 15.3 |
| 2020–21 | (Russia) Lokomotiv Kuban | VTBUL | 13 | 31.2 | .539 | .404 | .833 | 3.6 | 6.7 | 2.4 | — | 17.9 |
| 2021–22 | (Spain) Real Madrid | ACB | 27 | 18.9 | .483 | .295 | .833 | 2.3 | 1.9 | .7 | .0 | 7.4 |
| 2022–23 | (Spain) Real Madrid | ACB | 30 | 17.9 | .462 | .339 | .882 | 2.0 | 2.8 | .7 | .2 | 6.4 |
| 2023–24 | (Greece) Olympiacos | GBL | 24 | 20.7 | .482 | .434 | .839 | 2.1 | 3.3 | 1.0 | .0 | 9.8 |
| 2024–25 | (Greece) Olympiacos | GBL | 15 | 20.1 | .542 | .450 | .837 | 1.5 | 3.4 | .8 | .0 | 6.8 |

=== College ===
| Year | Team | GP | GS | MPG | FG% | 3P% | FT% | RPG | APG | SPG | BPG | PPG |
|---|---|---|---|---|---|---|---|---|---|---|---|---|
| 2013–14 | Washington | 32 | 32 | 33.2 | .464 | .356 | .723 | 4.4 | 4.4 | 1.1 | **.2** | 13.4 |
| 2014–15 | Washington | 30 | 30 | **36.8** | .442 | .256 | .763 | 4.7 | **5.9** | 1.1 | **.2** | 15.6 |
| 2015–16 | Gonzaga | Redshirt | | | | | | | | | | |
| 2016–17 | Gonzaga | **38** | **38** | 32.8 | **.486** | **.368** | **.867** | **6.0** | 4.7 | **1.7** | .1 | **16.8** |
| Career | | 100 | 100 | 34.2 | .464 | .331 | .806 | 5.1 | 5.0 | 1.3 | .1 | 15.4 |

== Career achievements and awards ==
=== Professional ===
- Serbian Cup Winner: (2018)
- Serbian Cup MVP: (2018)
- Greek All-Star: (2019)
