= Marko Čakarević =

Serbian basketball player

Free agent
- Position: Small forward

Personal information
- Born: May 13, 1988 (age 38) Belgrade, SR Serbia, SFR Yugoslavia
- Listed height: 2.00 m (6 ft 7 in)
- Listed weight: 88 kg (194 lb)

Career information
- NBA draft: 2010: undrafted
- Playing career: 2006–present

Career history
- 2006–2008: ASVEL
- 2009: Pelister
- 2009–2011: Radnički Kragujevac
- 2011–2013: Partizan
- 2013–2014: Metalac Valjevo
- 2014–2016: Igokea
- 2016: Timișoara
- 2017: Dynamic
- 2017–2018: Partizan
- 2018: Dynamic
- 2018–2019: Lietkabelis
- 2020: Kaposvári KK
- 2020: Dynamic
- 2021: Zdravlje
- 2021–2022: Star
- 2024: Qingdao Eagles

Career highlights
- Serbian Super League MVP (2017); Adriatic League champion (2013); 2× Serbian League champion (2012, 2013); 2× Bosnian League champion (2015, 2016); French Cup winner (2008); 2× Serbian Cup winner (2012, 2018); 2× Bosnian Cup winner (2015, 2016)

Marko Čakarević (Serbian Cyrillic: Марко Чакаревић, born May 13, 1988) is a Serbian professional basketball player who last played for Qingdao Eagles.

== Professional career ==
Čakarević started his professional career with the French team ASVEL, where he played from 2006 to 2008. In January 2009, Čakarević joined the Macedonian side Pelister, but returned to his homeland in March 2009, when he signed for Swisslion Takovo. From 2009 to 2011, Čakarević played for Radnički Kragujevac. In the summer of 2011, Čakarević was signed by Partizan. On August 2, 2013, he terminated his contract with Partizan and became a free agent. In November 2013, he signed with Metalac Valjevo.

In August 2014, he signed a one-year deal with Igokea. In August 2015, he re-signed with the team. In the preseason tournament played in Valjevo, he injured his shoulder, injury that will likely keep him off the court the entire season.

In the summer of 2016, he signed with Romanian club Timișoara. In December 2016, he parted ways with Timișoara after appearing in six games. In February 2017, he signed with Serbian club Dynamic for the rest of the season. He was named the MVP of the Serbian Super League's 2017 season.

On September 19, 2017, he returned to Partizan for the 2017–18 season. He left Partizan in June 2018.

On October 22, 2018, he returned to Dynamic for the 2018–19 season. On November 30, he signed with Lithuanian club Lietkabelis.

On February 21, 2020, he signed with Hungarian club Kaposvár for the 2019–20 season.

== National team career ==
Čakarević won the gold medals at the 2007 FIBA Under-19 World Championship and the 2008 FIBA Europe Under-20 Championship.
