= KK Dynamic =

Basketball club in Belgrade, Serbia

Dynamic Balkan Bet
- Leagues: Basketball League of Serbia
- Founded: 2015; 11 years ago
- History: KK Dynamic BG; 2015–present
- Arena: Ranko Žeravica Sports Hall
- Capacity: 5,000
- Location: Belgrade, Serbia
- Team colors: Orange and Black
- Head coach: Saša Nikitović
- Championships: 1 Serbian League B 1 BFS Cup
- Website: kkdynamic.rs
Home	Away

Košarkaški klub Dynamic BG (Serbian Cyrillic: Кошаркашки клуб Динамик БГ), commonly referred to as KK Dynamic or Dynamic Balkan Bet due to sponsorship reasons, is a men's professional basketball club based in Belgrade, Serbia. They are currently competing in the top-tier Basketball League of Serbia.

== History ==
Dynamic was founded in March 2015 in Belgrade. One of the founders was a basketball coach Miroslav Nikolić.

In its debut season in the Second League of Serbia KK Dynamic won the League and got promoted to the Basketball League of Serbia for the 2016–17 season.

== Sponsorship naming ==
The club has had several denominations through the years due to its sponsorship:

- Dynamic VIP PAY (2018–2022)
- Dynamic Balkan Bet (2022–present)

== Home arenas ==
- Dynamic Sports Center (2015–present)
- Ranko Žeravica Hall (2017–present)

== Logos ==
2015–2018

2018–present

== Players ==
=== Current roster ===
Note: Flags indicate national team eligibility at FIBA-sanctioned events. Players may hold other non-FIBA nationalities not displayed.

Dynamic Belgrade roster
Players
Coaches

Pos.	No.	Nat.	Name	Ht.	Age
F	0	(Serbia)	Velimirović, Uroš	1.92 m (6 ft 4 in)	21 – 11 February 2005
PG	1	(Serbia)	Ristić, Aleksa	1.92 m (6 ft 4 in)	20 – 11 July 2005
F	2	(Serbia)	Romić, Ognjen	2.05 m (6 ft 9 in)	21 – 22 May 2005
PG	3	(Serbia)	Protić, Nemanja	1.82 m (6 ft 0 in)	39 – 13 August 1986
F	4	(Serbia)	Kostić, Nikola	1.99 m (6 ft 6 in)	32 – 28 June 1993
PF	6	(Serbia)	Lugić, Lazar	2.06 m (6 ft 9 in)	28 – 5 May 1998
G	11	(Serbia)	Petrović, Ilija	2.06 m (6 ft 9 in)	21 – 5 May 2005
F	12	(Serbia)	Lakić, Stefan	2.01 m (6 ft 7 in)	31 – 12 January 1995
F/C	15	(Serbia)	Nekić, Jovan	2.05 m (6 ft 9 in)	21 – 20 January 2005
C	19	(Serbia)	Malešević, Filip	2.17 m (7 ft 1 in)	20 – 15 August 2005
C	21	(Serbia)	Joksimović, Lazar	2.03 m (6 ft 8 in)	24 – 6 January 2002
F/C	23	(Serbia)	Dishman, DeAndre	1.98 m (6 ft 6 in)	28 – 1 January 1998
G	44	(Serbia)	Obradović, Rastko	1.96 m (6 ft 5 in)	18 – 1 August 2007

Head coach

- (Serbia) Nikola Marković

Assistant coach(es)

- (Serbia) Jovan Beader
- (Serbia) Božidar Babović
- (Serbia) Nemanja Jovićević

Legend

- (C) Team captain
- Injured

- Roster
Updated: January 3, 2023

== Coaches ==
- (Serbia) Bojan Kusmuk (14 March 2015 – 14 February 2016)
- (Serbia) Miroslav Nikolić (14 February 2016 – 28 June 2017)
- (Serbia) Oliver Popović (7 August 2017 – 19 December 2017)
- (Serbia) Miroslav Nikolić (19 December 2017 – 4 July 2018 )
- (Serbia) Vladimir Đokić (4 July 2018 – 10 April 2019)
- (Slovenia) Miro Alilović (10 April 2019 – 12 February 2021)
- (Serbia) Saša Nikitović (12 February 2021 – 1 February 2024)
- (Serbia) Nikola Marković (1 February 2024 – present)

== Season-by-season ==
Season	Tier	Division	Pos.	Postseason	W–L	National Cup	Regional competitions			European competitions
2015–16	2	BLS Second League	1	None	21–5	—	—			—
2016–17	1	BLS First League	3	SL 5th	25–15	Quarterfinalist	—			—
2017–18	1	BLS First League	2	Quarterfinalist	17–15	Quarterfinalist	ABA 2nd League	10	8–14	—
2018–19	1	BLS First League	3	SL B–3rd	25–11	Quarterfinalist	ABA 2nd League	5	12–10	—
2019–20	1	BLS First League	5	Abd	16–10	Quarterfinalist	ABA 2nd League	Abd	8–14	—
2020–21	1	BLS First League	4	DNQ	16–14	—	—			—
2021–22	1	BLS First League	5	PR QF	18–14	—	—			—
2022–23	1	BLS First League	6	DNQ	18–12	—	—			—
2023–24	1	BLS First League	9	DNQ	13–17	—	—			—
2024–25	1	BLS First League	9	DNQ	14–16	—	—			—

== Trophies and awards ==
=== Trophies ===
- Serbian League B
  - Winners (1): 2015–16
- BFS Cup
  - Winners (1): 2016–17

=== Individual awards ===
- BLS First League MVP Award
  - (Jamaica) Kimani Ffriend — 2016–17
- BLS Super League MVP Award
  - (Serbia) Marko Čakarević — 2016–17

== Management ==
- President:
- Vice-President: Goran Milić
- Technical secretary: Aleksandar Smiljanić
- Public relations manager:
- Sports director: Mirko Pavlović
- Head coach: [[]]

== Notable players ==
- (Serbia) Stevan Nađfeji
- (Serbia) Bojan Krstović
- (Serbia) Marko Čakarević
- (Serbia) Dušan Beslać
- (Serbia) Ilija Milijašević
- (Serbia) Vojin Medarević
- (Serbia) Nemanja Jaramaz
- (Serbia) Nenad Nerandžić
- (Serbia) Nenad Šulović
- (Jamaica) Kimani Ffriend
- (Bosnia and Herzegovina) Aleksandar Lazić
- (Bosnia and Herzegovina) Ratko Varda
- (Slovenia) Aleksandar Ćapin
- (Slovenia) Gregor Glas
- (Slovakia) Peter Sedmak
