= 2017–18 KK Crvena zvezda season =

Serbian basketball club season

Crvena zvezda mts
2017–18 season
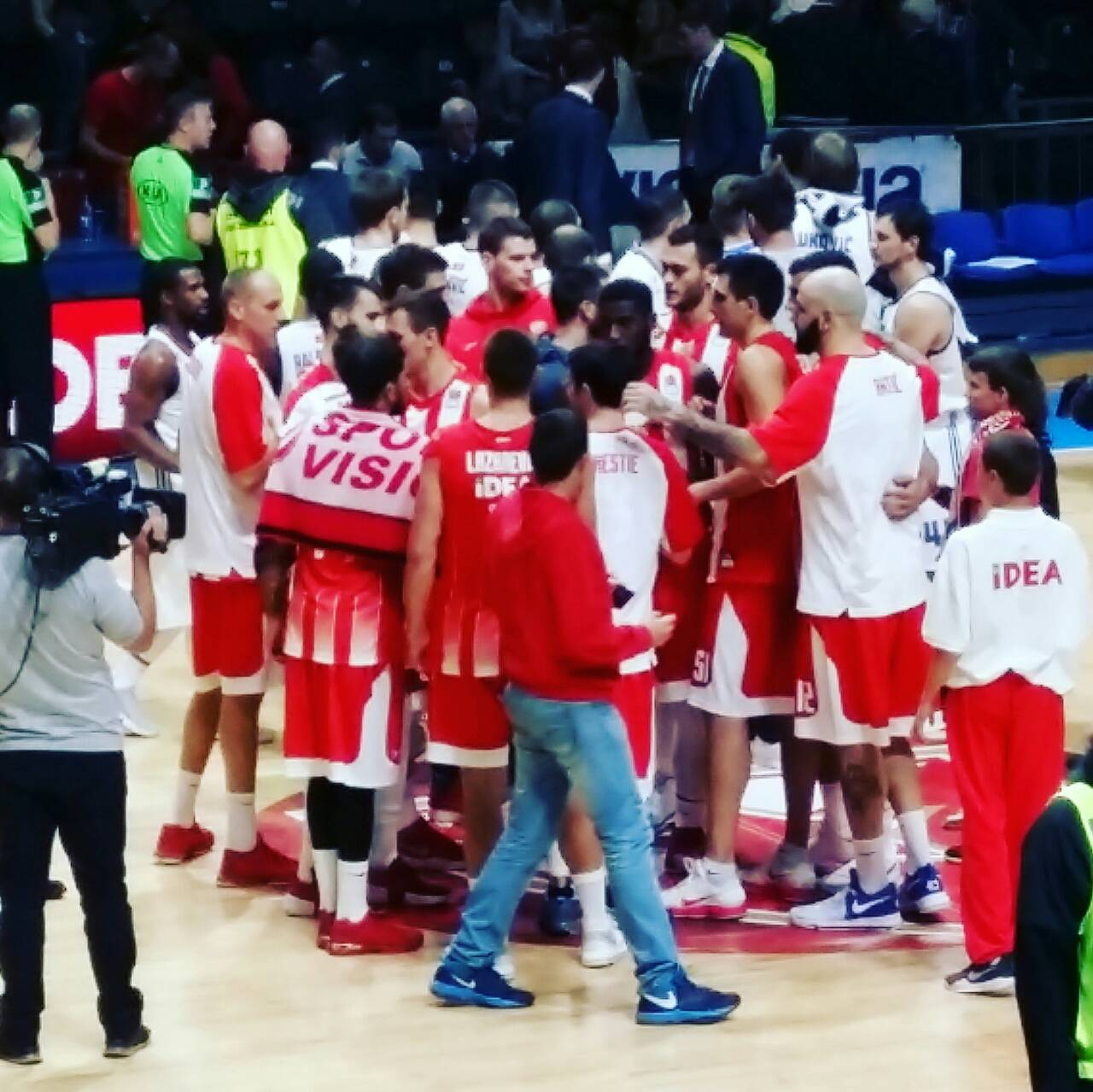
- President: (Serbia) Nebojša Čović
- Head coach: (Serbia) Dušan Alimpijević (until May 2018) (Serbia) Milenko Topić (Interim) (May 2018 onwards)
- Arena: Aleksandar Nikolić Hall; Štark Arena
- Adriatic League: 1st
- Playoffs: Runners-up
- Serbian League: 1st (Group A)
- Playoffs: Champions
- EuroLeague: 14th
- Radivoj Korać Cup: Runners-up
- Adriatic Supercup: Withdrew
- Highest home attendance: 13,467; 59–85 CSKA Moscow (15 November 2017)
- Lowest home attendance: 200; 97–87 Tamiš (15 May 2018)
- Average home attendance: 6,277 (EuroLeague); 4,416 (Adriatic League)
- Biggest win: 115–64 Mladost (18 April 2018)
- Biggest defeat: FC Barcelona Lassa 88–54 (9 March 2018)
Home	Away	Third
- All statistics correct as of May 21, 2018.

The 2017–18 season is the 73rd Crvena zvezda season in the existence of the club. The team has been playing in the Basketball League of Serbia, in the Adriatic League, and in the Euroleague.

== Overview ==
During the summer of 2017, the head coach Dejan Radonjić didn't sign new contract, and the club parted ways with no less than eleven players, including key figures in the last couple of years such as Marko Simonović, captain Luka Mitrović, Charles Jenkins, Stefan Jović, Ognjen Kuzmić and Marko Gudurić. Young prospect Dušan Alimpijević was named as the head coach. Depleted roster was reinforced by James Feldeine and Taylor Rochestie, veterans Pero Antić and Marko Kešelj and a quartet of young players: Mathias Lessort, Nikola Radičević, Stefan Janković and Nikola Jovanović. Zvezda also brought in Dragan Apić, Dejan Davidovac and Stefan Lazarević from its development team FMP. Half of rebuilt team hasn't previously played a single game in EuroLeague.

During October 2017, the Zvezda won six out of ten played games. The Adriatic League season opening started with three wins in a row. In the EuroLeague they won on two home games over FC Barcelona and Maccabi.

Breaking with defense oriented philosophy of Radonjić era, the staple of Zvezda's game became 3 point shot. In December 2017. roster was further strengthened with combo guard Dylan Ennis, while Apić and Lazarević got loaned back to FMP. Last player to arrive was Slovenian national team center Alen Omić, while underperforming Radičević parted ways with the club. Zvezda finished first in the regular part of ABA league, having 19 wins and 3 losses, and reached finals by defeating Mornar 2–1 in series, but lost 3–1 in final series to Budućnost. Defeat meant that club will not participate in Euroleague next year, which triggered downsizing. Management terminated contract with Dylan Ennis and Milko Bjelica, and reinforced squad with Filip Čović and young prospect Aleksa Radanov from FMP. Poor start in domestic KLS forced coach Alimpijević to resign, and his assistant Milenko Topić took over as interim head coach. Modified team managed to win the Superleague title, beating FMP in the finals, but the season was generally deemed to be unsuccessful due to failure to secure a spot in Euroleague.

== Players ==
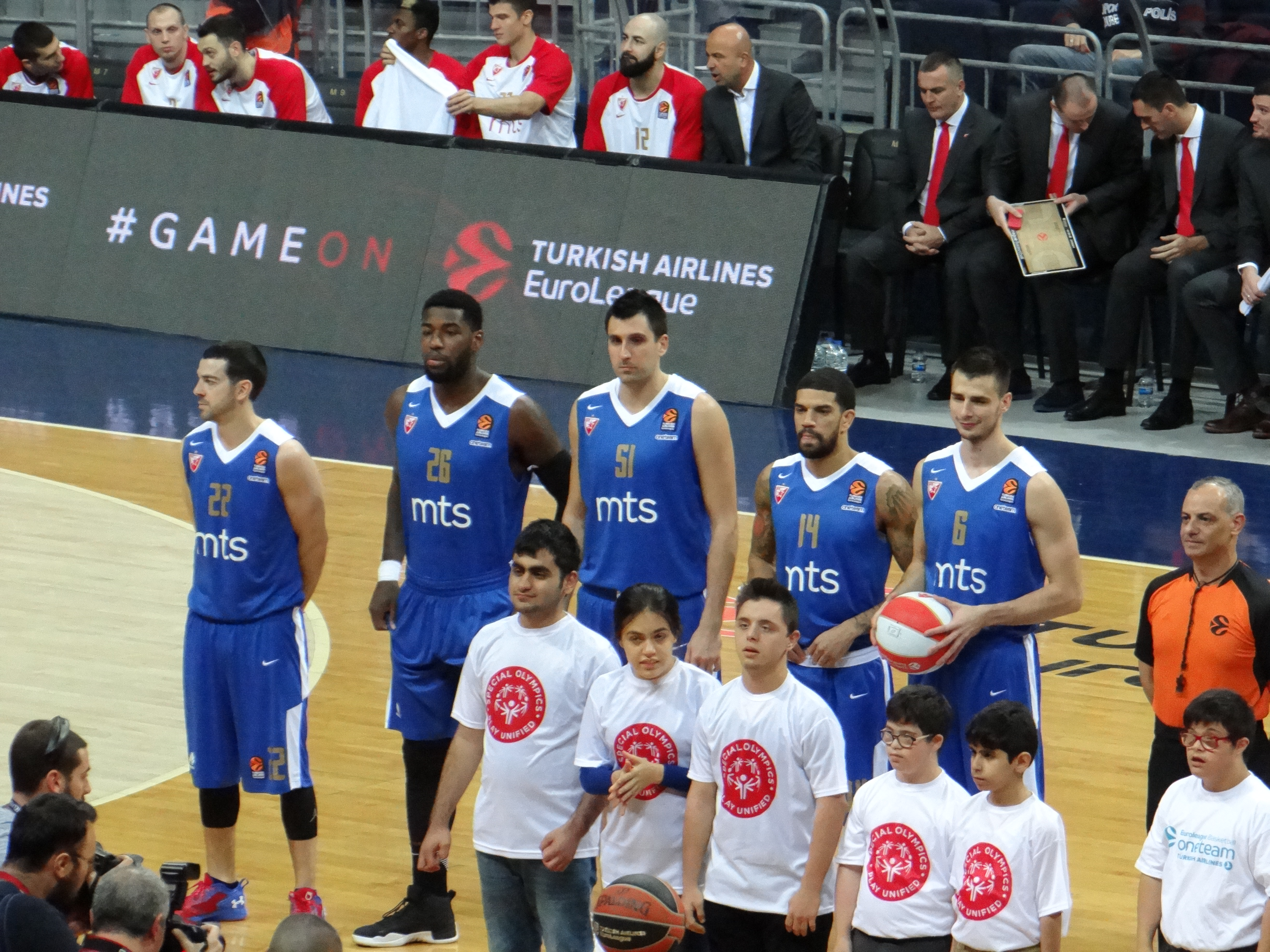
2017–18 roster

=== Squad information ===
Note: Flags indicate national team eligibility at FIBA-sanctioned events. Players may hold other non-FIBA nationalities not displayed.

Crvena zvezda mts roster
Players
Coaches

Pos.	No.	Nat.	Name	Ht.	Wt.	Age
F/C	12	(North Macedonia)	Antić, Pero	2.11 m (6 ft 11 in)	118 kg (260 lb)	44 – 29 July 1982
PG	3	(Serbia)	Čović, Filip	1.80 m (5 ft 11 in)	72 kg (159 lb)	37 – 5 June 1989
SF	6	(Serbia)	Dangubić, Nemanja (injured)	2.04 m (6 ft 8 in)	88 kg (194 lb)	33 – 13 April 1993
G/F	7	(Serbia)	Davidovac, Dejan	2.03 m (6 ft 8 in)	95 kg (209 lb)	31 – 17 January 1995
G/F	13	(Serbia)	Dobrić, Ognjen	2.00 m (6 ft 7 in)	93 kg (205 lb)	31 – 27 October 1994
SG	14	(Dominican Republic)	Feldeine, James	1.93 m (6 ft 4 in)	91 kg (201 lb)	38 – 26 June 1988
F/C	16	(Serbia)	Janković, Stefan	2.11 m (6 ft 11 in)	107 kg (236 lb)	33 – 4 August 1993
F/C	32	(Serbia)	Jovanović, Nikola	2.11 m (6 ft 11 in)	109 kg (240 lb)	32 – 6 January 1994
SF	4	(Serbia)	Kešelj, Marko	2.06 m (6 ft 9 in)	94 kg (207 lb)	38 – 2 January 1988
G/F	10	(Serbia)	Lazić, Branko (C)	1.95 m (6 ft 5 in)	91 kg (201 lb)	37 – 12 January 1989
F/C	26	(France)	Lessort, Mathias	2.06 m (6 ft 9 in)	113 kg (249 lb)	31 – 29 September 1995
C	23	(Slovenia)	Omić, Alen	2.16 m (7 ft 1 in)	102 kg (225 lb)	34 – 6 May 1992
SF	11	(Serbia)	Radanov, Aleksa	2.02 m (6 ft 8 in)	84 kg (185 lb)	28 – 1 February 1998
G	22	(Montenegro)	Rochestie, Taylor	1.85 m (6 ft 1 in)	88 kg (194 lb)	41 – 1 July 1985

Head coach

- (Serbia) Milenko Topić (interim)

Assistant coach(es)

- (Serbia) Slobodan Ljubotina
- (Serbia) Saša Kosović
- (Serbia) Aleksandar Zarić

Strength & conditioning coach(es)

- (Serbia) Aleksandar Jovančević

Legend

- (C) Team captain
- Injured

- Roster
- Transactions

=== Depth chart ===
Pos.	Starting 5	Bench 1	Bench 2	Reserves
C	Alen Omić	Mathias Lessort	Nikola Jovanović
PF	Stefan Janković	Pero Antić
SF	Branko Lazić	Dejan Davidovac		Marko Kešelj
SG	James Feldeine	Ognjen Dobrić	Aleksa Radanov	Nemanja Dangubić
PG	Taylor Rochestie	Filip Čović

=== Players with multiple nationalities ===
- (North Macedonia) (Serbia) (Bulgaria) Pero Antić
- (Dominican Republic) (United States) James Feldeine
- (Serbia) (Canada) Stefan Janković
- (Slovenia) (Bosnia and Herzegovina) Alen Omić
- (Montenegro) (United States) Taylor Rochestie

=== On loan ===
KK Crvena zvezda players out on loan
Nat.	Player	Position	Team	On loan since
(Serbia)	Marko Radovanović	PF	(Serbia) FMP	June 2017
(Serbia)	Boriša Simanić	PF	(Serbia) FMP	August 2017
(Serbia)	Petar Rakićević	SG/SF	(Serbia) FMP (Serbia) Dynamic VIP PAY	August–November 2017; November 2017
(Serbia)	Stefan Lazarević	SG/SF	(Serbia) FMP	December 2017
(Serbia)	Dragan Apić	PF/C	(Serbia) FMP	December 2017
(Serbia)	Stefan Momirov	SG	(Serbia) FMP (Serbia) Vršac	August–December 2017; December 2017
(Serbia)	Stefan Đorđević	PF	(Serbia) FMP (Serbia) Vršac	August–December 2017; December 2017

=== Youth players ===
Under a contract

- (Serbia) Ranko Simović
- (Serbia) Arijan Lakić

Registered for the Adriatic League

- (Serbia) Zoran Paunović
- (Serbia) Nemanja Popović
- (Serbia) Lazar Vasić

=== Players In ===
Position	#	Player	Moving from	Ref.
PF	–	(Australia) Jonah Bolden^{1}	(Serbia) FMP	
SF	10	(Serbia) Branko Lazić	Re-sign	
SF	4	(Serbia) Marko Kešelj	(Belgium) Oostende	
C/PF	16	(Serbia) Stefan Janković	(United States) Lakeland Magic	
PF/C	32	(Serbia) Nikola Jovanović	(United States) Westchester Knicks	
PG	5	(Serbia) Nikola Radičević	(Spain) Real Betis Energía Plus	
SG	14	(Dominican Republic) James Feldeine	(Greece) Panathinaikos Superfoods	
SF/PG	7	(Serbia) Dejan Davidovac	(Serbia) FMP (Loan return)	
SG/SF	11	(Serbia) Stefan Lazarević	(Serbia) FMP (Loan return)	
PF/C	15	(Serbia) Dragan Apić	(Serbia) FMP (Loan return)	
PF/C	26	(France) Mathias Lessort	(France) Nanterre 92	
PG/SG	22	(Montenegro) Taylor Rochestie	(Russia) Lokomotiv Kuban	
PF/C	12	(North Macedonia) Pero Antić	(Turkey) Fenerbahçe Doğuş (Loan)	
PG	31	(Jamaica) Dylan Ennis	(Serbia) Mega Bemax	
C	23	(Slovenia) Alen Omić	(Israel) Hapoel Jerusalem	
G/SF	11	(Serbia) Aleksa Radanov	(Serbia) FMP (Loan return)	
PG	3	(Serbia) Filip Čović	(Serbia) FMP	

Source: ABA League, Euroleague

=== Players Out ===
Position	#	Player	Moving to	Ref.
SF	19	(Serbia) Marko Simonović	(Russia) Zenit Saint Petersburg	
PF	9	(Serbia) Luka Mitrović	(Germany) Brose Bamberg	
SG	22	(United States) Charles Jenkins	(Russia) Khimki	
PG	24	(Serbia) Stefan Jović	(Germany) Bayern Munich	
SF	23	(Serbia) Marko Gudurić	(Turkey) Fenerbahçe Doğuş	
PF	–	(Australia) Jonah Bolden^{1}	(Israel) Maccabi Tel Aviv	
C	32	(Serbia) Ognjen Kuzmić	(Spain) Real Madrid	
C	7	(Serbia) Aleksandar Aranitović^{2}	(Serbia) Partizan	
C	2	(United States) Deon Thompson	(Spain) Miraflores	
PF	12	(Serbia) Boriša Simanić	(Serbia) FMP (Loan)	
SG/SF	20	(Serbia) Petar Rakićević	(Serbia) FMP (Loan)	
PG	–	(Serbia) Aleksa Uskoković^{3}	(Serbia) FMP	
PG	0	(United States) Nate Wolters	(United States) Utah Jazz	
PF	–	(Serbia) Marko Tejić^{4}	(Greece) Trikala Aries	
SG/SF	11	(Serbia) Stefan Lazarević	(Serbia) FMP (Loan)	
PF/C	15	(Serbia) Dragan Apić	(Serbia) FMP (Loan)	
PG	5	(Serbia) Nikola Radičević	(Spain) Herbalife Gran Canaria	
PG	31	(Jamaica) Dylan Ennis	(Spain) Zaragoza	
PF/C	51	(Montenegro) Milko Bjelica	(Spain) Zaragoza	

Notes:

- ^{1} Sign and trade. Didn't play a single regular season game.
- ^{2} Missed entire 2016–17 season due to injury.
- ^{3} Played for the U18 team.
- ^{4} On loan during entire 2016–17 season.

== Club ==
=== Technical Staff ===
Position	Staff member
General Manager	(Serbia) Davor Ristović
Sports Director	(Serbia) Nebojša Ilić
Team Manager	(Serbia) Nebojša Ilić
Head coach	(Serbia) Milenko Topić
Assistant coaches	(Serbia) Slobodan Ljubotina
Assistant coaches	(Serbia) Saša Kosović
Assistant coaches	(Serbia) Aleksandar Zarić
Conditioning coach	(Serbia) Aleksandar Jovančević
Physiotherapist	(Serbia) Milorad Ćirić
Doctors	(Serbia) Nebojša Mitrović
Doctors	(Serbia) Boris Gluščević

Source: Crvena zvezda Staff

=== Technical Staff changes ===
Change	Date	Staff member	Staff position	Ref.
Out	July 2017	(Montenegro) Dejan Radonjić	Head coach	
Out	July 2017	(Montenegro) Borko Radović	Assistant coach	
Out	July 2017	(Serbia) Nikola Birač	Assistant coach	
Out	July 2017	(Montenegro) Dragan Gačević	Conditioning Coach	
In	July 2017	(Serbia) Dušan Alimpijević	Head coach	
In	July 2017	(Serbia) Milenko Topić	Assistant coach	
In	July 2017	(Serbia) Slobodan Ljubotina	Assistant coach	
In	July 2017	(Serbia) Aleksandar Jovančević	Conditioning Coach	
Out	August 2017	(Serbia) Mirko Pavlović	Sports director	
In	September 2017	(Serbia) Nebojša Ilić	Sports director	
Out	8 May 2018	(Serbia) Dušan Alimpijević	Head coach	
In	8 May 2018	(Serbia) Milenko Topić	Head coach	

=== Kit ===
- Supplier: Nike
- Main sponsor: mts
- Back sponsor: Idea (top); Huawei (bottom)
- Left shoulder sponsor: Mitsubishi Motors

Home	Away	Alternate

== Pre-season and friendlies ==
Win Loss

30 August 2017	Crvena zvezda mts (Serbia)	116–79	(Serbia) Vršac	Belgrade
	Scoring by quarter: 28–25, 31–19, 25–15, 32–20
	Pts: Bjelica 23; Rebs: not available Asts: Radičević 5 PIR: not available	Boxscore	Pts: Kutlešić 21; Rebs: not available Asts: not available PIR: not available	Arena: Aleksandar Nikolić Hall

3 September 2017	Zenit St Petersburg (Russia)	66–69	(Serbia) Crvena zvezda mts	Vršac
18:00	Scoring by quarter: 13–20, 18–13, 21–20, 14–16
	Pts: not available Rebs: not available Asts: not available PIR: not available	Report	Pts: Bjelica 21; Rebs: Bjelica 6 Asts: not available PIR: not available	Arena: Millennium Hall

6 September 2017	Crvena zvezda mts (Serbia)	81–56	(Serbia) Borac Čačak	Belgrade
18:00	Scoring by quarter: 16–18, 21–18, 21–11, 23–9
	Pts: Lessort 20; Rebs: Lessort, Janković 5 Asts: Radičević 11; PIR: not available	Boxscore	Pts: Đoković 13; Rebs: not available Asts: not available PIR: not available	Arena: Aleksandar Nikolić Hall

9 September 2017	Crvena zvezda mts (Serbia)	83–70	(Turkey) Bursaspor Durmazlar	Belgrade
18:00	Scoring by quarter: 9–17, 24–17, 32–20, 18–16
	Pts: Bjelica 16; Rebs: Lessort 9 Asts: Radičević 9 PIR: not available	Boxscore	Pts: Borovnjak 21; Rebs: not available Asts: not available PIR: not available	Arena: Aleksandar Nikolić Hall

12 September 2017	Crvena zvezda mts (Serbia)	100–70	(Romania) Steaua CSM EximBank	Belgrade
18:00	Scoring by quarter: 22–25, 26–13, 21–19, 31–13
	Pts: Feldeine 24; Rebs: Lessort 8 Asts: Radičević 5 PIR: Lessort 27	Boxscore	Pts: Lapornik 15; Rebs: not available Asts: not available PIR: not available	Arena: Aleksandar Nikolić Hall

16 September 2017	Crvena zvezda mts (Serbia)	87–82	(Russia) Lokomotiv Kuban	Belgrade
	Scoring by quarter: 23–23, 24–23, 20–22, 20–14
	Pts: Bjelica 24; Rebs: Lessort 6 Asts: Feldeine 5 PIR: not available	Boxscore	Pts: Ragland 23; Rebs: not available Asts: not available PIR: not available	Arena: Aleksandar Nikolić Hall

Crete Heraklion – 2nd International Basketball Tournament

22 September 2017 Semifinals	Crvena zvezda mts (Serbia)	56–70	(Greece) Olympiacos	Heraklion, Crete
20:30	Scoring by quarter: 10–17, 12–22, 16–14, 18–17
	Pts: Bjelica 16; Rebs: not available Asts: not available PIR: not available	Boxscore	Pts: not available Rebs: not available Asts: not available PIR: not available	Arena: Heraklion Indoor Sports Arena

24 September 2017 3rd place game	Crvena zvezda mts (Serbia)	68–73	(Russia) UNICS	Heraklion, Crete
18:00	Scoring by quarter: 20–16, 11–20, 14–16, 23–21
	Pts: Bjelica, Lessort 15; Rebs: Bjelica 10; Asts: not available PIR: not available	Boxscore	Pts: Colom 13; Rebs: not available Asts: not available PIR: not available	Arena: Heraklion Indoor Sports Arena

== Competitions ==
=== Overall ===
Competition	Started round	Final position / round	First match	Last match
Adriatic League	Matchday 1	Runners-up	October 1, 2017	April 14, 2018
EuroLeague	Matchday 1	14th	October 13, 2017	April 6, 2018
Serbian Super League	Matchday 1	Champions	April 18, 2018	June 11, 2018
Radivoj Korać Cup	Quarterfinals	Runners-up	February 15, 2018	February 18, 2018
Adriatic Supercup	—N/a	Withdrew	DNP	

Source: Competitions

=== Overview ===
Competition	Record							
Competition	Pld	W	D	L	PF	PA	PD	Win %
Adriatic League	22	19	0	3	1,955	1,679	+276	86.36
Adriatic League Playoffs	7	3	0	4	558	514	+44	42.86
Serbian League	10	8	0	2	903	735	+168	80.00
Serbian League Playoffs	7	7	0	0	615	500	+115	100.00
Radivoj Korać Cup	3	2	0	1	258	242	+16	66.67
EuroLeague	30	11	0	19	2,333	2,515	−182	36.67
Total	79	50	0	29	6,622	6,185	+437	63.29

Last updated: June 11, 2018
Source: Competitions

=== Adriatic League ===
==== Regular season ====
Pos	Team	Pld	W	L	PF	PA	PD	Pts	Qualification or relegation
1	(Serbia) Crvena zvezda mts	22	19	3	1955	1679	+276	41	Advance to the playoffs
2	(Montenegro) Budućnost VOLI	22	17	5	1863	1661	+202	39 (Note: Budućnost VOLI 1–1, 1.01; Cedevita 1–1, 0.99)	Advance to the playoffs
3	(Croatia) Cedevita	22	17	5	1798	1645	+153	39	Advance to the playoffs
4	(Montenegro) Mornar	22	14	8	1825	1790	+35	36	Advance to the playoffs
5	(Serbia) Partizan NIS	22	11	11	1936	1893	+43	33	

Source: ABA League

==== Results by round ====
Round	1	2	3	4	5	6	7	8	9	10	11	12	13	14	15	16	17	18	19	20	21	22
Ground	H	H	A	H	A	H	A	H	A	H	A	A	A	H	A	H	A	H	A	H	A	H
Result	W	W	W	L	L	W	W	W	W	W	W	W	W	W	L	W	W	W	W	W	W	W
Position	1	2	1	1	3	2	2	2	2	2	2	1	1	1	3	2	2	1	1	1	1	1

Last updated: March 12, 2018.
Source: Competitive matches
Ground: A = Away; H = Home; R = Rest. Result: L = Loss; W = Win; R = Rest; P = Postponed.

Win Loss

==== Matches ====
1 October 2017 1	Crvena zvezda mts (Serbia)	88–77	(Montenegro) Mornar	Belgrade
21:00 (CEST)	Scoring by quarter: 19–12, 28–18, 23–20, 18–27
	Pts: Lessort 22; Rebs: Dangubić, 6 Asts: Rochestie 7 PIR: Lessort 30	Report	Pts: Raley-Ross 21; Rebs: Shepherd 11; Asts: Bakić 6 PIR: Shepherd 22	Arena: Aleksandar Nikolić Hall; Attendance: 3,000; Referees: Matej Boltauzer, Siniša Herceg, Mario Majkić

4 October 2017 2	Crvena zvezda mts (Serbia)	90–80	(Serbia) Mega Bemax	Belgrade
21:00 (CEST)	Scoring by quarter: 26–19, 18–17, 22–25, 24–19
	Pts: Rochestie 26; Rebs: Bjelica 8 Asts: Rochestie 6 PIR: Rochestie 23	Report	Pts: Ennis 21; Rebs: Fundić 7 Asts: Ennis 7 PIR: Ennis 33	Arena: Aleksandar Nikolić Hall; Attendance: 3,489; Referees: Saša Pukl, Radoš Arsenijević, Branislav Mrdak

8 October 2017 3	Petrol Olimpija (Slovenia)	73–82	(Serbia) Crvena zvezda mts	Ljubljana
17:00 (CEST)	Scoring by quarter: 29–18, 13–25, 16–21, 15–18
	Pts: Battle 17; Rebs: Morgan 12; Asts: Morgan 4 PIR: Battle 23	Report	Pts: Dobrić 17; Rebs: Lessort 9 Asts: Radičević 7 PIR: Rochestie 23	Arena: Tivoli Hall; Attendance: 3,000; Referees: Sreten Radović, Igor Dragojević, Miloš Koljenšić

15 October 2017 4	Crvena zvezda mts (Serbia)	75–79	(Montenegro) Budućnost VOLI	Belgrade
19:00 (CEST)	Scoring by quarter: 16–17, 18–13, 16–22, 25–27
	Pts: Rochestie 23; Rebs: Bjelica, Lessort 6 Asts: Rochestie 7 PIR: Rochestie 29	Report	Pts: Gordić 17; Rebs: Gibson 7 Asts: Ivanović 6 PIR: Gordić 19	Arena: Železnik Hall; Attendance: 2,000; Referees: Ilija Belošević, Milija Vojinović, Josip Radojković

22 October 2017 5	Cedevita (Croatia)	79–74	(Serbia) Crvena zvezda mts	Zagreb
17:00 (CEST)	Scoring by quarter: 19–18, 20–21, 24–22, 16–13
	Pts: Musa 17; Rebs: Johnson 9 Asts: Cherry 4 PIR: Musa, Johnson 19	Report	Pts: Rochestie 18; Rebs: Jovanović 7 Asts: Feldeine 6 PIR: Rochestie 20	Arena: Dom Sportova; Attendance: 2,200; Referees: Matej Boltauzer, Sašo Petek, Mario Majkić

30 October 2017 6	Crvena zvezda mts (Serbia)	112–73	(North Macedonia) MZT Skopje Aerodrom	Belgrade
18:00 (CET)	Scoring by quarter: 28–23, 30–23, 33–8, 21–19
	Pts: Radičević 17; Rebs: Janković 7 Asts: Radičević 10; PIR: Radičević 28	Report	Pts: Trajkovski 30; Rebs: Trajkovski 7 Asts: Garcia 7 PIR: Trajkovski 25	Arena: Aleksandar Nikolić Hall; Attendance: 2,000; Referees: Tomislav Hordov, Milan Nedović, Radoš Savović

6 November 2017 7	Partizan NIS (Serbia)	84–100	(Serbia) Crvena zvezda mts	Belgrade
21:00 (CET)	Scoring by quarter: 21–26, 21–27, 21–21, 21–26
	Pts: Veličković 18; Rebs: Williams-Goss 5 Asts: Miller 11; PIR: Miller 24	Report	Pts: Bjelica 29; Rebs: Antić 8 Asts: Feldeine, Rochestie 7 PIR: Bjelica 35	Arena: Aleksandar Nikolić Hall; Attendance: 6,000; Referees: Milivoje Jovčić, Damir Javor, Milija Vojinović

12 November 2017 8	Crvena zvezda mts (Serbia)	84–77	(Serbia) FMP	Belgrade
17:00 (CET)	Scoring by quarter: 19–18, 17–17, 26–20, 22–22
	Pts: Feldeine 31; Rebs: Lessort 10; Asts: Rochestie 9 PIR: Feldeine 29	Report	Pts: Čović 19; Rebs: Pot 8 Asts: Čović 7 PIR: Čović 21	Arena: Aleksandar Nikolić Hall; Attendance: 1,987; Referees: Sreten Radović, Igor Mitrovski, Ivan Stefanović

20 November 2017 9	Zadar (Croatia)	76–88	(Serbia) Crvena zvezda mts	Zadar
18:00 (CET)	Scoring by quarter: 23–19, 22–23, 9–29, 22–17
	Pts: Knowles 17; Rebs: Brzoja 6 Asts: Knowles 4 PIR: Knowles 16	Report	Pts: Bjelica 20; Rebs: Dangubić 5 Asts: Lazić 3 PIR: Bjelica 22	Arena: Krešimir Ćosić Hall; Attendance: 6,500; Referees: Matej Boltauzer, Matej Špendl, Dragan Porobić

4 December 2017 10	Crvena zvezda mts (Serbia)	85–80	(Bosnia and Herzegovina) Igokea	Belgrade
21:00 (CET)	Scoring by quarter: 22–19, 26–19, 16–20, 21–22
	Pts: Rochestie 20; Rebs: Dobrić 5 Asts: Davidovac, Rochestie 5 PIR: Rochestie 23	Report	Pts: Rikić 23; Rebs: Rikić 7 Asts: Ljubičić 6 PIR: Rikić 25	Arena: Aleksandar Nikolić Hall; Attendance: 3,574; Referees: Siniša Herceg, Igor Dragojević, Sašo Petek

11 December 2017 11	Cibona (Croatia)	87–93	(Serbia) Crvena zvezda mts	Zagreb
18:00 (CET)	Scoring by quarter: 18–35, 24–22, 21–22, 24–14
	Pts: Žorić 20; Rebs: Three players 4 Asts: Uljarević 6 PIR: Žorić 25	Report	Pts: Feldeine 23; Rebs: Bjelica 7 Asts: Rochestie 6 PIR: Bjelica 26	Arena: Dražen Petrović Basketball Hall; Attendance: 1,500; Referees: Saša Pukl, Mario Majkić, Radoš Savović

17 December 2017 12	Mornar (Montenegro)	74–82	(Serbia) Crvena zvezda mts	Bar
19:00 (CET)	Scoring by quarter: 29–19, 15–28, 12–19, 18–16
	Pts: Luković 18; Rebs: Luković 9 Asts: Needham 10; PIR: Luković 28	Report	Pts: Feldeine, Janković 18; Rebs: Antić 11; Asts: Rochestie 6 PIR: Janković 23	Arena: Topolica Sport Hall; Attendance: 2,650; Referees: Sreten Radović, Milivoje Jovčić, Miloš Koljenšić

25 December 2017 13	Mega Bemax (Serbia)	85–90	(Serbia) Crvena zvezda mts	Sremska Mitrovica
18:00 (CET)	Scoring by quarter: 25–24, 13–27, 21–15, 26–24
	Pts: Lazić 17; Rebs: Lazić 15; Asts: Rebić 6 PIR: Lazić 25	Report	Pts: Feldeine 24; Rebs: Antić 6 Asts: Rochestie 8 PIR: Feldeine 30	Arena: Sports Hall Pinki; Attendance: 2,550; Referees: Milija Vojinović, Vladan Šundić, Dragan Porobić

2 January 2018 14	Crvena zvezda mts (Serbia)	80–76	(Slovenia) Petrol Olimpija	Belgrade
19:00 (CET)	Scoring by quarter: 16–18, 24–19, 22–19, 18–20
	Pts: Rochestie 16; Rebs: Lessort 8 Asts: Lazić 4 PIR: Rochestie 19	Report	Pts: Špan 15; Rebs: Morgan 11; Asts: Oliver 3 PIR: Morgan 17	Arena: Aleksandar Nikolić Hall; Attendance: 6,100; Referees: Ilija Belošević, Sašo Petek, Denis Hadžić

8 January 2018 15	Budućnost VOLI (Montenegro)	92–86	(Serbia) Crvena zvezda mts	Podgorica
17:00 (CET)	Scoring by quarter: 22–27, 25–15, 26–25, 19–19
	Pts: Ivanović 18; Rebs: D. Nikolić 5 Asts: Gordić 6 PIR: Ivanović 20	Report	Pts: Rochestie 19; Rebs: Lessort 7 Asts: Rochestie 7 PIR: Rochestie 24	Arena: Morača Sports Center; Attendance: 4,950; Referees: Saša Pukl, Damir Javor, Mario Majkić

14 January 2018 16	Crvena zvezda mts (Serbia)	82–66	(Croatia) Cedevita	Belgrade
19:00 (CET)	Scoring by quarter: 26–13, 28–16, 18–11, 10–26
	Pts: Feldeine 27; Rebs: Lessort 9 Asts: Rochestie 10; PIR: Rochestie 27	Report	Pts: Nichols 13; Rebs: Markota 6 Asts: Katić 4 PIR: Cherry 15	Arena: Aleksandar Nikolić Hall; Attendance: 6,345; Referees: Milivoje Jovčić, Tomislav Hordov, Miloš Koljenšić

22 January 2018 17	MZT Skopje Aerodrom (North Macedonia)	58–92	(Serbia) Crvena zvezda mts	Skopje
18:00 (CET)	Scoring by quarter: 18–21, 7–19, 17–28, 16–24
	Pts: Maslinko 15; Rebs: Mavra 6 Asts: Mavra 6 PIR: Maslinko 18	Report	Pts: Dobrić 23; Rebs: Lessort 7 Asts: Davidovac 5 PIR: Dobrić 21	Arena: Jane Sandanski Arena; Attendance: 3,400; Referees: Igor Dragojević, Marko Juras, Krunoslav Peić

29 January 2018 18	Crvena zvezda mts (Serbia)	86–74	(Serbia) Partizan NIS	Belgrade
21:00 (CET)	Scoring by quarter: 22–24, 27–19, 22–14, 15–17
	Pts: Dobrić 18; Rebs: Dobrić 4 Asts: Rochestie 10; PIR: Dobrić 24	Report	Pts: Veličković 20; Rebs: Veličković 10; Asts: Williams-Goss 5 PIR: Veličković 29	Arena: Aleksandar Nikolić Hall; Attendance: 5,203; Referees: Siniša Herceg, Uroš Obrknežević, Ivan Stefanović

5 February 2018 19	FMP (Serbia)	77–100	(Serbia) Crvena zvezda mts	Belgrade
18:00 (CET)	Scoring by quarter: 14–25, 21–18, 18–26, 24–31
	Pts: Čović 18; Rebs: Apić 4 Asts: Čović 5 PIR: Čović 19	Report	Pts: Feldeine 19; Rebs: Janković 5 Asts: Rochestie 8 PIR: Feldeine 19	Arena: Železnik Hall; Attendance: 1,350; Referees: Milija Vojinović, Branislav Mrdak, Vladan Šundić

12 February 2018 20	Crvena zvezda mts (Serbia)	97–67	(Croatia) Zadar	Belgrade
18:00 (CET)	Scoring by quarter: 22–19, 25–17, 28–14, 22–17
	Pts: Feldeine 14; Rebs: Lessort 8 Asts: Ennis 7 PIR: Feldeine 20	Report	Pts: Krajina 16; Rebs: Božić 7 Asts: Krajina 6 PIR: Božić 18	Arena: Aleksandar Nikolić Hall; Attendance: 2,437; Referees: Sašo Petek, Igor Mitrovski, Milan Nedović

5 March 2018 21	Igokea (Bosnia and Herzegovina)	76–82	(Serbia) Crvena zvezda mts	Laktaši
18:00 (CET)	Scoring by quarter: 24–22, 21–20, 20–18, 11–22
	Pts: Jevtović 17; Rebs: Glogovac 7 Asts: Ljubičić 7 PIR: Jevtović 20	Report	Pts: Rochestie 23; Rebs: Antić, Omić 7 Asts: Feldeine 4 PIR: Rochestie 18	Arena: Laktaši Sports Hall; Attendance: 2,000; Referees: Marko Juras, Denis Hadžić, Dragan Porobić

12 March 2018 22	Crvena zvezda mts (Serbia)	107–69	(Croatia) Cibona	Belgrade
18:00 (CET)	Scoring by quarter: 24–14, 24–22, 34–17, 25–16
	Pts: Ennis 21; Rebs: Lessort 7 Asts: Ennis, Feldeine 5 PIR: Feldeine 29	Report	Pts: Uljarević 13; Rebs: Ljubičić 5 Asts: Uljarević 3 PIR: Bošnjak, Uljarević 16	Arena: Aleksandar Nikolić Hall; Attendance: 2,137; Referees: Uroš Obrknežević, Matej Špendl, Krunoslav Peić

==== Playoffs ====
18 March 2018 Semifinals 1	Crvena zvezda mts (Serbia)	91–63 (Series: 1–0)	(Montenegro) Mornar	Belgrade
19:00	Scoring by quarter: 22–14, 19–8, 23–27, 27–14
	Pts: Feldeine 23; Rebs: Omić 8 Asts: Ennis 6 PIR: Feldeine 25	Report	Pts: Needham 16; Rebs: Vujošević 7 Asts: Needham, Raley-Ross 4 PIR: Pavić 16	Arena: Aleksandar Nikolić Hall; Attendance: 7,237; Referees: Saša Pukl, Tomislav Hordov, Milan Nedović

25 March 2018 Semifinals 2	Mornar (Montenegro)	88–84 (Series: 1–1)	(Serbia) Crvena zvezda mts	Bar
20:00	Scoring by quarter: 30–21, 18–24, 21–19, 19–20
	Pts: Vranješ 29; Rebs: Mićović 7 Asts: Needham 5 PIR: Vranješ, Needham 28	Report	Pts: Rochestie 16; Rebs: Davidovac, Dobrić 6 Asts: Feldeine, Rochestie 4 PIR: Davidovac, Rochestie 21	Arena: Topolica Sport Hall; Attendance: 3,000; Referees: Sreten Radović, Matej Boltauzer, Marko Juras

2 April 2018 Semifinals 3	Crvena zvezda mts (Serbia)	88–69 (Series: 2–1)	(Montenegro) Mornar	Belgrade
21:00	Scoring by quarter: 26–19, 26–18, 16–19, 20–13
	Pts: Dobrić 19; Rebs: Bjelica 7 Asts: Rochestie 6 PIR: Dobrić 23	Boxscore	Pts: Vranješ 21; Rebs: Mićović 7 Asts: Needham 4 PIR: Vranješ 16	Arena: Aleksandar Nikolić Hall; Attendance: 7,036; Referees: Mario Majkić, Sašo Petek, Igor Dragojević

9 April 2018 Finals 1	Crvena zvezda mts (Serbia)	76–80 (Series: 0–1)	(Montenegro) Budućnost VOLI	Belgrade
19:00	Scoring by quarter: 22–25, 16–12, 19–26, 19–17
	Pts: Omić 14; Rebs: Lessort 5 Asts: Rochestie 10; PIR: Rochestie 20	Report	Pts: Ivanović 20; Rebs: Doellman 8 Asts: Gordić, Doellman 4 PIR: Gordić, Ivanović 23	Arena: Aleksandar Nikolić Hall; Attendance: 7,001; Referees: Matej Boltauzer, Sreten Radović, Tomislav Hordov

10 April 2018 Finals 2	Crvena zvezda mts (Serbia)	69–59 (Series: 1–1)	(Montenegro) Budućnost VOLI	Belgrade
18:30	Scoring by quarter: 17–13, 14–18, 16–17, 22–11
	Pts: Omić 15; Rebs: Omić 10; Asts: Feldeine, Rochestie 5 PIR: Omić 27	Report	Pts: Gordić 22; Rebs: Doellman 6 Asts: three players 2 PIR: Gordić 12	Arena: Aleksandar Nikolić Hall; Attendance: 6,398; Referees: Ilija Belošević, Saša Pukl, Miloš Koljenšić

13 April 2018 Finals 3	Budućnost VOLI (Montenegro)	78–77 (Series: 2–1)	(Serbia) Crvena zvezda mts	Podgorica
20:00	Scoring by quarter: 24–23, 18–24, 26–17, 10–13
	Pts: Gordić 17; Rebs: Ivanović 4 Asts: Gordić 5 PIR: Gordić 21	Report	Pts: Feldeine 19; Rebs: Lessort 6 Asts: Feldeine, Rochestie 5 PIR: Feldeine 20	Arena: Morača Sports Center; Attendance: 6,000; Referees: Damir Javor, Tomislav Hordov, Mario Majkić

14 April 2018 Finals 4	Budućnost VOLI (Montenegro)	77–73 (Series: 3–1)	(Serbia) Crvena zvezda mts	Podgorica
21:00	Scoring by quarter: 22–15, 14–23, 24–19, 17–16
	Pts: Gordić 18; Rebs: Šehović 6 Asts: Gordić 5 PIR: Barović 23	Report	Pts: Rochestie 14; Rebs: Omić 10; Asts: Rochestie 6 PIR: Omić 21	Arena: Morača Sports Center; Attendance: 6,000; Referees: Sreten Radović, Saša Pukl, Sašo Petek

=== EuroLeague ===
==== Regular season ====
Pos	Team	Pld	W	L	PF	PA	PD
12	(Germany) Brose Bamberg	30	11	19	2309	2446	−137
13	(Spain) FC Barcelona Lassa	30	11	19	2456	2404	+52
14	(Serbia) Crvena zvezda mts	30	11	19	2333	2515	−182
15	(Italy) AX Armani Exchange Olimpia	30	10	20	2407	2530	−123
16	(Turkey) Anadolu Efes	30	7	23	2321	2530	−209

Source: EuroLeague
Rules for classification: All points scored in extra period(s) will not be counted in the standings, nor for any tie-break situation.

==== Results by round ====
Round	1	2	3	4	5	6	7	8	9	10	11	12	13	14	15	16	17	18	19	20	21	22	23	24	25	26	27	28	29	30
Ground	A	H	A	H	H	A	H	A	H	A	H	A	A	H	A	H	A	H	A	H	A	H	A	H	A	H	A	H	H	A
Result	L	W	L	W	L	L	L	L	L	W	W	W	L	L	W	W	L	L	L	W	L	W	L	W	L	W	L	L	L	L
Position	10	6	10	8	10	13	15	16	16	15	12	11	12	12	11	11	11	11	12	11	12	11	12	11	11	10	11	11	12	14

Last updated: April 6, 2018.
Source: Competitive matches
Ground: A = Away; H = Home; R = Rest. Result: L = Loss; W = Win; R = Rest; P = Postponed.

Win Loss

==== Matches ====
Source: EuroLeague

13 October 2017 1	Žalgiris (Lithuania)	78–76	(Serbia) Crvena zvezda mts	Kaunas
19:00	Scoring by quarter: 15–13, 28–27, 10–17, 25–19
	Pts: Jankūnas 15; Rebs: Ulanovas 6 Asts: Micić 4 PIR: Jankūnas 28	Report	Pts: Antić 17; Rebs: Lessort 5 Asts: Rochestie 7 PIR: Bjelica 17	Arena: Žalgiris Arena; Attendance: 11,456; Referees: Elias Kormilas (GRE), Matej Boltauzer (SLO), Anne Panther (GER)

20 October 2017 2	Crvena zvezda mts (Serbia)	90–82	(Spain) FC Barcelona Lassa	Belgrade
19:00	Scoring by quarter: 24–13, 20–19, 18–25, 28–25
	Pts: Bjelica 23; Rebs: Antić, Lessort 9 Asts: Rochestie 7 PIR: Rochestie 27	Report	Pts: Séraphin 16; Rebs: Tomić 8 Asts: Heurtel 11; PIR: Heurtel 21	Arena: Aleksandar Nikolić Hall; Attendance: 6,086; Referees: Oļegs Latiševs (LAT), Carmelo Paternicò (ITA), Piotr Pastusiak (POL)

24 October 2017 3	Khimki (Russia)	85–78	(Serbia) Crvena zvezda mts	Khimki
19:30	Scoring by quarter: 20–28, 23–16, 21–11, 21–23
	Pts: Anderson 24; Rebs: Thomas 10; Asts: Shved 9 PIR: Anderson 28	Report	Pts: Bjelica 15; Rebs: Lessort 8 Asts: Rochestie 5 PIR: Lessort 8	Arena: Mytishchi Arena; Attendance: 5,198; Referees: Miguel Perez Perez (ESP), Spiros Gkontas (GRE), Amit Balak (ISR)

26 October 2017 4	Crvena zvezda mts (Serbia)	87–84	(Israel) Maccabi Tel Aviv	Belgrade
19:00	Scoring by quarter: 19–24, 20–25, 23–12, 25–23
	Pts: Rochestie 22; Rebs: Lazić 7 Asts: Feldeine 8 PIR: Feldeine 26	Report	Pts: Thomas 28; Rebs: Tyus 8 Asts: Cole 6 PIR: Thomas 31	Arena: Kombank Arena; Attendance: 8,230; Referees: Luigi Lamonica (ITA), Carlos Peruga (ESP), Anne Panther (GER)

2 November 2017 5	Crvena zvezda mts (Serbia)	69–75	(Germany) Brose Bamberg	Belgrade
18:00	Scoring by quarter: 18–30, 16–13, 19–16, 16–16
	Pts: Rochestie 22; Rebs: Lessort 9 Asts: Feldeine 4 PIR: Rochestie 24	Report	Pts: Rubit 15; Rebs: Radošević 7 Asts: Nikolić 4 PIR: Radošević 16	Arena: Kombank Arena; Attendance: 5,892; Referees: Juan Carlos Garcia Gonzalez (ESP), Ioannis Foufis (GRE), Joseph Bissang (FRA)

10 November 2017 6	Unicaja (Spain)	79–65	(Serbia) Crvena zvezda mts	Málaga
20:45	Scoring by quarter: 22–12, 23–19, 18–19, 16–15
	Pts: Nedović 17; Rebs: Brooks 7 Asts: McCallum, Nedović 4 PIR: Milosavljević 19	Report	Pts: three players 10; Rebs: Jovanović 8 Asts: Rochestie 6 PIR: Lessort 20	Arena: Palacio de Deportes José María Martín Carpena; Attendance: 7,521; Referees: Christos Christodoulou (GRE), Fernando Rocha (POR), Renaud Geller (BEL)

15 November 2017 7	Crvena zvezda mts (Serbia)	59–85	(Russia) CSKA Moscow	Belgrade
19:00	Scoring by quarter: 10–22, 17–22, 7–21, 25–20
	Pts: Rochestie 15; Rebs: Bjelica, Jovanović 6 Asts: Rochestie 5 PIR: Rochestie 22	Report	Pts: de Colo 16; Rebs: Hunter 10; Asts: Rodríguez 9 PIR: Hines 26	Arena: Kombank Arena; Attendance: 13,467; Referees: Daniel Hierrezuelo (ESP), Aare Halliko (EST), David Romano (ISR)

17 November 2017 8	Olympiacos (Greece)	85–59	(Serbia) Crvena zvezda mts	Piraeus
20:00	Scoring by quarter: 22–13, 25–24, 20–12, 18–10
	Pts: Thompson 14; Rebs: Milutinov 12; Asts: Strēlnieks 5 PIR: Milutinov 22	Report	Pts: Rochestie 20; Rebs: Rochestie 6 Asts: Radičević 5 PIR: Rochestie 17	Arena: Peace and Friendship Stadium; Attendance: 7,000; Referees: Miguel Pérez Pérez (ESP), Jakub Zamojski (POL), Michele Rossi (ITA)

23 November 2017 9	Crvena zvezda mts (Serbia)	81–85	(Spain) Baskonia	Belgrade
21:00	Scoring by quarter: 17–22, 21–25, 19–17, 24–21
	Pts: Lessort 19; Rebs: Bjelica 6 Asts: Feldeine 6 PIR: Lessort 18	Report	Pts: Voigtmann 17; Rebs: Voigtmann 8 Asts: Voigtmann 5 PIR: Shengelia 23	Arena: Kombank Arena; Attendance: 5,467; Referees: Carmelo Paternico (ITA), Elias Koromilas (GRE), Sergio Silva (POR)

1 December 2017 10	Real Madrid (Spain)	83–87	(Serbia) Crvena zvezda mts	Madrid
20:45	Scoring by quarter: 24–19, 15–27, 19–21, 25–20
	Pts: Dončić 20; Rebs: Reyes 8 Asts: Fernández, Dončić 5 PIR: Dončić 32	Report	Pts: Rochestie 18; Rebs: Bjelica 6 Asts: Rochestie 7 PIR: Rochestie 18	Arena: WiZink Center; Attendance: 9,239; Referees: Christos Christodoulou (GRE), Robert Lottermoser (GER), Piotor Paustusiak (POL)

8 December 2017 11	Crvena zvezda mts (Serbia)	100–81	(Turkey) Anadolu Efes	Belgrade
19:00	Scoring by quarter: 29–23, 21–21, 24–18, 26–19
	Pts: Feldeine 29; Rebs: Lessort 9 Asts: Rochestie 6 PIR: Feldeine 32	Report	Pts: Dunston 16; Rebs: Štimac 8 Asts: three players 4 PIR: Dragić 19	Arena: Aleksandar Nikolić Hall; Attendance: 6,123; Referees: Juan Carlos García González (ESP), Ioannis Foufis (GRE), Robert Vyklický (CYE)

15 December 2017 12	Valencia Basket (Spain)	82–86	(Serbia) Crvena zvezda mts	Valencia
20:30	Scoring by quarter: 22–26, 16–14, 25–16, 19–30
	Pts: San Emeterio 17; Rebs: Dubljević 10; Asts: Vives 5 PIR: Pleiß, San Emeterio 15	Report	Pts: Feldeine 26; Rebs: Bjelica 9 Asts: Feldeine 5 PIR: Feldeine 31	Arena: Fuente de San Luis; Attendance: 6,715; Referees: Borys Ryzhyk (UKR), Jakub Zamojski (POL), Elias Koromilas (GRE)

19 December 2017 13	Fenerbahçe Doğuş (Turkey)	82–56	(Serbia) Crvena zvezda mts	Istanbul
18:45	Scoring by quarter: 17–11, 24–22, 21–9, 20–14
	Pts: Veselý 15; Rebs: Veselý 8 Asts: Sloukas 8 PIR: Veselý 24	Report	Pts: Dobrić 15; Rebs: Lessort 9 Asts: Dangubić 4 PIR: Dobrić 17	Arena: Ülker Sports Arena; Attendance: 10,439; Referees: Christos Christodolou(GRE), Fernando Rocha (POR), Michele Rossi (ITA)

21 December 2017 14	Crvena zvezda mts (Serbia)	63–69	(Greece) Panathinaikos Superfoods	Belgrade
19:00	Scoring by quarter: 15–20, 23–21, 11–17, 14–11
	Pts: Feldeine 21; Rebs: Dangubić 6 Asts: Rochestie 5 PIR: Lessort 13	Report	Pts: Denmon, Gist 16; Rebs: Singleton, Lojeski 6 Asts: Pappas, Lekavičius 4 PIR: Gist 18	Arena: Aleksandar Nikolić Hall; Attendance: 5,978; Referees: Miguel Perez Perez (ESP), Petri Mantyla (FIN), Seffi Shemmesh (ISR)

29 December 2017 15	AX Armani Exchange Olimpia (Italy)	88–91	(Serbia) Crvena zvezda mts	Milan
20:45	Scoring by quarter: 15–29, 25–16, 20–16, 28–30
	Pts: Micov 16; Rebs: Gudaitis 8 Asts: Cinciarini 5 PIR: Cinciarini 20	Report	Pts: Feldeine 19; Rebs: Bjelica 7 Asts: Antić 5 PIR: Bjelica 28	Arena: Mediolanum Forum; Attendance: 8,670; Referees: Carlos Peruga (ESP), Piotr Pastusiak (POL), Ioannis Foufis (GRE)

5 January 2018 16	Crvena zvezda mts (Serbia)	77–65	(Lithuania) Žalgiris	Belgrade
19:00	Scoring by quarter: 15–29, 17–13, 15–14, 29–20
	Pts: Rochestie 16; Rebs: Lessort 9 Asts: Rochestie 10; PIR: Rochestie 26	Report	Pts: Pangos 19; Rebs: Pangos 7 Asts: Pangos 3 PIR: Pangos 19	Arena: Aleksandar Nikolić Hall; Attendance: 6,123; Referees: Luigi Lamonica (ITA), Emilio Perez Pizarro (ESP), Marcin Kowalski (POL)

12 January 2018 17	Anadolu Efes (Turkey)	104–95	(Serbia) Crvena zvezda mts	Istanbul
18:30	Scoring by quarter: 22–21, 28–25, 27–25, 27–24
	Pts: Dragić 24; Rebs: Dunston 7 Asts: four players 4 PIR: Dragić 34	Boxscore	Pts: Bjelica 15; Rebs: Bjelica 6 Asts: Rochestie 4 PIR: Bjelica 22	Arena: Sinan Erdem Dome; Attendance: 2,682; Referees: Miguel Pérez Pérez (ESP), Spiros Gkontas (GRE), Amit Balak (ISR)

16 January 2018 18	Crvena zvezda mts (Serbia)	70–79	(Russia) Khimki	Belgrade
19:00	Scoring by quarter: 21–14, 16–17, 17–21, 16–27
	Pts: Rochestie 27; Rebs: Lessort, Rochestie 9 Asts: Rochestie 7 PIR: Rochestie 38	Report	Pts: Shved 29; Rebs: Thomas, Shved 5 Asts: Marković 6 PIR: Shved 33	Arena: Aleksandar Nikolić Hall; Attendance: 5,958; Referees: Juan Carlos Garcia Gonzalez (ESP), Carmelo Paternico (ITA), Sergio Silva (POR)

18 January 2018 19	Maccabi Tel Aviv (Israel)	89–75	(Serbia) Crvena zvezda mts	Tel Aviv
20:05	Scoring by quarter: 23–16, 24–13, 17–23, 25–23
	Pts: Jackson 22; Rebs: Bolden, Tyus 7 Asts: Cole, Jackson 5 PIR: Jackson 24	Report	Pts: Bjelica 13; Rebs: Dangubić 7 Asts: Rochestie 8 PIR: Rochestie 19	Arena: Menora Mivtachim Arena; Attendance: 10,500; Referees: Christos Christodolou (GRE), Carlos Peruga (ESP), Robert Vyklicky (CZE)

26 January 2018 20	Crvena zvezda mts (Serbia)	89–78	(Greece) Olympiacos	Belgrade
19:00	Scoring by quarter: 24–20, 19–14, 14–29, 32–15
	Pts: Ennis 21; Rebs: Ennis 8 Asts: Rochestie 6 PIR: Ennis 31	Report	Pts: Spanoulis 16; Rebs: Papanikolaou 8 Asts: Papanikolaou 6 PIR: Papanikolaou 23	Arena: Aleksandar Nikolić Hall; Attendance: 5,993; Referees: Benjamin Jimenez (ESP), Piotr Pastusiak (POL), Joseph Bissang (FRA)

2 February 2018 21	Baskonia (Spain)	103–84	(Serbia) Crvena zvezda mts	Vitoria-Gasteiz
20:30	Scoring by quarter: 27–17, 26–23, 22–19, 28–25
	Pts: Beaubois 25; Rebs: Shengelia 7 Asts: Huertas 7 PIR: Beaubois 24	Report	Pts: Ennis 22; Rebs: Omić 4 Asts: Rochestie 5 PIR: Ennis 23	Arena: Fernando Buesa Arena; Attendance: 9,622; Referees: Borys Ryzhuk (UKR), Elias Kormilas (GRE), Sergio Silva (POR)

9 February 2018 22	Crvena zvezda mts (Serbia)	100–89	(Italy) AX Armani Exchange Olimpia	Belgrade
19:00	Scoring by quarter: 23–20, 27–25, 21–20, 29–24
	Pts: Lessort, Janković 15; Rebs: Lessort 10; Asts: Rochestie 9 PIR: Lessort 19	Report	Pts: Kuzminskas 17; Rebs: Tarczewski 6 Asts: Theodore 8 PIR: Theodore 18	Arena: Aleksandar Nikolić Hall; Attendance: 4,895; Referees: Daniel Hierrezuelo (ESP), Spiros Gkontas (GRE), Aare Halliko (EST)

23 February 2018 23	Brose Bamberg (Germany)	86–62	(Serbia) Crvena zvezda mts	Bamberg
20:45	Scoring by quarter: 21–23, 25–13, 23–9, 17–17
	Pts: Wright 21; Rebs: Musli 13; Asts: Zisis 6 PIR: Wright 29	Boxscore	Pts: Lessort 12; Rebs: Lessort 6 Asts: Bjelica, Rochestie 4 PIR: Lessort 19	Arena: Brose Arena; Attendance: 5,851; Referees: Oļegs Latiševs (LAT), Piotr Pastusiak (POL), Carlos Cortés (ESP)

2 March 2018 24	Crvena zvezda mts (Serbia)	80–76	(Spain) Unicaja	Belgrade
19:00	Scoring by quarter: 24–24, 16–13, 22–15, 18–24
	Pts: Rochestie 21; Rebs: Lessort 8 Asts: Rochestie, Feldeine 4 PIR: Rochestie 21	Report	Pts: Waczyński 13; Rebs: Augustine 9 Asts: Augustine 4 PIR: Brooks, Augustine 15	Arena: Aleksandar Nikolić Hall; Attendance: 4,873; Referees: Carmelo Paternico (ITA), Amit Balak (ISR), Mority Reiter (GER)

9 March 2018 25	FC Barcelona Lassa (Spain)	88–54	(Serbia) Crvena zvezda mts	Barcelona
21:00	Scoring by quarter: 17–12, 28–12, 17–25, 26–5
	Pts: Ribas 18; Rebs: Moerman 9 Asts: Ribas 6 PIR: Ribas 25	Report	Pts: Rochestie 14; Rebs: Omić 5 Asts: Rochestie 3 PIR: Rochestie 14	Arena: Palau Blaugrana; Attendance: 4,421; Referees: Fernando Rocha (POR), Spiros Gkontas (GRE), Petri Mäntylä (FIN)

16 March 2018 26	Crvena zvezda mts (Serbia)	106–90	(Spain) Valencia Basket	Belgrade
19:00	Scoring by quarter: 23–23, 27–25, 29–19, 27–23
	Pts: Feldeine 30; Rebs: Lessort 7 Asts: Rochestie 5 PIR: Feldeine 32	Report	Pts: Martínez 22; Rebs: Dubljević, Pleiß 4 Asts: Abalde 6 PIR: Martínez 23	Arena: Aleksandar Nikolić Hall; Attendance: 4,472; Referees: Robert Lottermoser (GER), Elias Koromilas (GRE), Mykola Ambrosov (UKR)

20 March 2018 27	Panathinaikos Superfoods (Greece)	91–71	(Serbia) Crvena zvezda mts	Athens
20:15	Scoring by quarter: 24–15, 23–23, 30–18, 14–15
	Pts: Singleton 21; Rebs: Payne 9 Asts: Calathes 10; PIR: Calathes 34	Report	Pts: Davidovac 17; Rebs: Janković, Omić 7 Asts: Rochestie 6 PIR: Omić 18	Arena: Olympic Sports Center Athens; Attendance: 10,000; Referees: Carmelo Paternico (ITA), Carlos Peruga (ESP), Clemens Fritz (GER)

22 March 2018 28	Crvena zvezda mts (Serbia)	63–80	(Turkey) Fenerbahçe Doğuş	Belgrade
19:00	Scoring by quarter: 17–22, 14–18, 10–25, 22–15
	Pts: Davidovac 18; Rebs: Lessort 6 Asts: Lessort 4 PIR: Davidovac 25	Report	Pts: Dixon 25; Rebs: Melli 7 Asts: Gudurić 5 PIR: Dixon 28	Arena: Aleksandar Nikolić Hall; Attendance: 4,849; Referees: Emilio Perez Pizarro (ESP), Spiros Gkontas (GRE), Amit Balak (ISR)

30 March 2018 29	Crvena zvezda mts (Serbia)	79–82	(Spain) Real Madrid	Belgrade
19:00	Scoring by quarter: 20–27, 19–16, 18–21, 22–18
	Pts: Omić 25; Rebs: Omić 10; Asts: Feldeine 9 PIR: Omić 30	Report	Pts: Dončić 27; Rebs: Reyes, Dončić 9 Asts: Fernández 5 PIR: Dončić 35	Arena: Aleksandar Nikolić Hall; Attendance: 5,745; Referees: Christos Christodoulou (GRE), Jakub Zamojski (POL), Emin Mogulkoc (TUR)

5 April 2018 30	CSKA Moscow (Russia)	92–81	(Serbia) Crvena zvezda mts	Moscow
20:00	Scoring by quarter: 23–24, 14–20, 27–19, 28–18
	Pts: Fridzon 20; Rebs: Clyburn, Rodríguez 4 Asts: Higgins, Westermann 5 PIR: Fridzon 29	Report	Pts: Rochestie 13; Rebs: Janković 8 Asts: Rochestie 5 PIR: Dobrić 18	Arena: Megasport Arena; Attendance: 7,209; Referees: Miguel Pérez Pérez (ESP), Fernando Rocha (POR), Rain Peerandi (EST)

=== Serbian Super League ===
==== League table (Group A) ====
Pos	Team	Pld	W	L	PF	PA	PD	Pts	Qualification
1	Crvena zvezda mts	10	8	2	903	735	+168	18 (Note: Crvena zvezda mts 1–1, 1.02; Borac 1–1, 0.98)	Qualification to the Playoffs
2	Borac	10	8	2	897	747	+150	18	Qualification to the Playoffs
3	Mega Bemax	10	6	4	850	809	+41	16	Qualification to the Playoffs
4	Zlatibor	10	4	6	843	901	−58	14	Qualification to the Playoffs
5	Tamiš	10	3	7	810	830	−20	13	
6	Mladost	10	1	9	736	1017	−281	11	

Source: Basketball League of Serbia

==== Results by round ====
Round	1	2	3	4	5	6	7	8	9	10
Ground	H	H	A	H	A	A	A	H	A	H
Result	W	W	L	W	W	W	L	W	W	W
Position	1	1	2	2	2	1	2	1	1	1

Last updated: May 15, 2018.
Source: Competitive matches
Ground: A = Away; H = Home; R = Rest. Result: L = Loss; W = Win; R = Rest; P = Postponed.

Win Loss

==== Matches ====
18 April 2018 1	Crvena zvezda mts	115–64	Mladost	Belgrade
19:00	Scoring by quarter: 26–15, 27–21, 29–16, 33–12
	Pts: Janković 22; Rebs: Lessort 9 Asts: Čović, Rochestie 5 PIR: Janković 25	Report	Pts: Jeković 18; Rebs: Malidžan 9 Asts: Malidžan 5 PIR: Jeković 16	Arena: Aleksandar Nikolić Hall; Attendance: 1,007; Referees: Radoš Arsenijević, Vladimir Jevtović, Duško Sedlar

21 April 2018 2	Crvena zvezda mts	91–64	Mega Bemax	Belgrade
21:00	Scoring by quarter: 27–10, 19–19, 22–13, 23–22
	Pts: Feldeine, Janković 17; Rebs: Janković 8 Asts: Rochestie 7 PIR: Čović, Janković 27	Report	Pts: Bitadze 16; Rebs: Mišković 10; Asts: Čarapić 4 PIR: Bitadze 16	Arena: Aleksandar Nikolić Hall; Attendance: 1,234; Referees: Uroš Obrknežević, Saša Maričić, Ivan Stefanović

24 April 2018 3	Borac	70–63	Crvena zvezda mts	Čačak
18:00	Scoring by quarter: 23–17, 14–9, 18–15, 15–22
	Pts: Pešaković 13; Rebs: Stojadinović 10; Asts: Pešaković 4 PIR: Pešaković 18	Report	Pts: Čović 18; Rebs: Omić 7 Asts: Rochestie 3 PIR: Čović 22	Arena: Borac Hall; Attendance: 2,500; Referees: Milija Vojinović, Uroš Nikolić, Siniša Prpa

27 April 2018 4	Crvena zvezda mts	102–64	Zlatibor	Belgrade
19:00	Scoring by quarter: 30–19, 18–12, 29–22, 25–11
	Pts: Jovanović 17; Rebs: Omić 9 Asts: Rochestie 8 PIR: Omić, Čović 23	Report	Pts: Simović 15; Rebs: Popović, Riznić 6 Asts: Popović 9 PIR: Papić 15	Arena: Aleksandar Nikolić Hall; Attendance: 898; Referees: Aleksandar Glišić, Ivan Stefanović, Aleksandar Milojević

30 April 2018 5	Tamiš	86–87	Crvena zvezda mts	Pančevo
18:00	Scoring by quarter: 20–25, 21–22, 19–24, 26–16
	Pts: Smiljanić 19; Rebs: Smiljanić, Stanojević 5 Asts: Sočanac, Knežević; PIR: Smiljanić 27	Report	Pts: Feldeine 22; Rebs: Radanov 8 Asts: Feldeine, Rochestie 6 PIR: Feldeine 20	Arena: Strelište Sports Hall; Attendance: — Referees: Aleksandar Glišić, Siniša Prpa, Marko Strika

3 May 2018 6	Mladost	75–104	Crvena zvezda mts	Belgrade
18:00	Scoring by quarter: 14–25, 25–32, 19–19, 17–28
	Pts: Brkić 19; Rebs: Svilar 5 Asts: Svilar 8 PIR: Malidžan 21	Report	Pts: Kešelj, Omić 14; Rebs: Davidovac 7 Asts: Čović, Rochestie 10; PIR: Davidovac 24	Arena: Vizura Sports Center; Attendance: 400; Referees: Branislav Mrdak, Nemanja Ninković, Duško Sedlar

6 May 2018 7	Mega Bemax	76–74	Crvena zvezda mts	Belgrade
21:30	Scoring by quarter: 19–25, 20–17, 16–22, 21–10
	Pts: Fundić 19; Rebs: Fundić 18; Asts: Musić 6 PIR: Fundić 20	Report	Pts: Feldeine 29; Rebs: Davidovac, Omić 6 Asts: Čović 6 PIR: Feldeine 22	Arena: Mega Factory; Attendance: 650; Referees: Uroš Nikolić, Vladimir Jevtović, Nemanja Ninković

9 May 2018 8	Crvena zvezda mts	84–74	Borac	Belgrade
18:00	Scoring by quarter: 20–18, 20–20, 21–18, 23–18
	Pts: Dobrić 17; Rebs: Omić 10; Asts: Čović, Rochestie 4 PIR: Dobrić, Omić 20	Report	Pts: Todorović 20; Rebs: Todorović, Stojadinović 6 Asts: Đoković, Radulović 6 PIR: Todorović 21	Arena: Aleksandar Nikolić Hall; Attendance: 1,017; Referees: Milivoje Jovčić, Aleksandar Glišić, Saša Maričić

12 May 2018 9	Zlatibor	75–89	Crvena zvezda mts	Čajetina
19:00	Scoring by quarter: 20–23, 17–27, 12–22, 26–17
	Pts: Papić 22; Rebs: Popović 10; Asts: Popović 9 PIR: Popović 25	Report	Pts: Čović, Omić 19; Rebs: Davidovac 7 Asts: Rochestie 8 PIR: Dobrić 20	Arena: WAI TAI - STC Zlatibor; Attendance: 900; Referees: Siniša Prpa, Uroš Nikolić, Uroš Obrknežević

15 May 2018 10	Crvena zvezda mts	94–87	Tamiš	Belgrade
13:00	Scoring by quarter: 29–17, 21–27, 17–23, 27–20
	Pts: Omić 19; Rebs: Omić 14; Asts: Omić 5 PIR: Omić 40	Report	Pts: Ilkić 18; Rebs: Smiljanić, Vitković 5 Asts: Savić 6 PIR: Vitković 20	Arena: Železnik Hall; Attendance: 200; Referees: Marko Juras, Ivan Stefanović, Aleksandar Milojević

==== Playoffs ====
21 May 2018 Quarterfinals 1	Crvena zvezda mts	89–50 (Series: 1–0)	Vršac	Belgrade
18:00	Scoring by quarter: 21–10, 29–16, 19–13, 20–10
	Pts: Feldeine 14; Rebs: Jovanović 8 Asts: Rochestie 8 PIR: Rochestie 20	Boxscore	Pts: Đorđević 13; Rebs: Momirov 10; Asts: Jovović 4 PIR: Momirov 20	Arena: Aleksandar Nikolić Hall; Attendance: 1,000; Referees: Branislav Mrdak, Ivan Stefanović, Radoš Arsenijević

23 May 2018 Quarterfinals 2	Vršac	82–109 (Series: 0–2)	Crvena zvezda mts	Vršac
21:00	Scoring by quarter: 19–33, 21–28, 21–26, 21–22
	Pts: Đorđević 15; Rebs: Momirov 9 Asts: Pašajlić 9 PIR: Đorđević, Pašajlić 19	Boxscore	Pts: Omić 21; Rebs: Omić 8 Asts: Čović 5 PIR: Omić 34	Arena: Millennium Centar; Attendance: 3,000; Referees: Radoš Arsenijević, Branislav Mrdak, Ivan Stefanović

28 May 2018 Semifinals 1	Crvena zvezda mts	87–62 (Series: 1–0)	Partizan NIS	Belgrade
18:00	Scoring by quarter: 23–15, 18–18, 20–19, 26–10
	Pts: Rochestie 22; Rebs: Rochestie, Omić 6 Asts: Rochestie 5 PIR: Rochestie 32	Report	Pts: Vaughn 16; Rebs: Veličković 9 Asts: Williams-Goss 7 PIR: Williams-Goss 16	Arena: Aleksandar Nikolić Hall; Attendance: 2,200; Referees: Milivoje Jovčić, Milija Vojinović, Aleksandar Glišić

30 May 2018 Semifinals 2	Partizan NIS	73–81 (Series: 0–2)	Crvena zvezda mts	Belgrade
20:00	Scoring by quarter: 18–21, 20–16, 24–20, 11–24
	Pts: Williams-Goss 20; Rebs: Čakarević, Veličković 7 Asts: Vaughn, Veličković 4 PIR: Gagić 18	Boxscore	Pts: Rochestie 23; Rebs: Davidovac 9 Asts: Antić 5 PIR: Rochestie 30	Arena: Aleksandar Nikolić Hall; Attendance: 6,500; Referees: Ilija Belošević, Uroš Nikolić, Vladimir Jevtović

7 June 2018 Finals 1	Crvena zvezda mts	84–83 (Series: 1–0)	FMP	Belgrade
20:00	Scoring by quarter: 24–25, 14–11, 18–25, 28–22
	Pts: Omić 22; Rebs: Omić, Lazić 5 Asts: Rochestie 12; PIR: Rochestie 27	Report	Pts: Nenadić 19; Rebs: Pot, Ojo 8 Asts: Pot 10; PIR: Nenadić, Ojo 19	Arena: Aleksandar Nikolić Hall; Attendance: N/A; Referees: Milija Vojinović, Marko Juras, Saša Maričić

9 June 2018 Finals 2	FMP	62–68 (Series: 0–2)	Crvena zvezda mts	Belgrade
18:00	Scoring by quarter: 20–10, 14–29, 16–18, 12–11
	Pts: Apić 14; Rebs: Simanić 11; Asts: Đoković 6 PIR: Apić 22	Report	Pts: Feldeine 24; Rebs: Omić, Čović 7 Asts: Čović 9 PIR: Omić 20	Arena: Železnik Hall; Attendance: 1,879; Referees: Milivoje Jovčić, Aleksandar Glišić, Vladimir Jevtović

11 June 2018 Finals 3	Crvena zvezda mts	97–88 (Series: 3–0)	FMP	Belgrade
19:00	Scoring by quarter: 21–26, 35–21, 21–19, 20–22
	Pts: Omić 20; Rebs: Omić 11; Asts: Čović 10; PIR: Omić 32	Report	Pts: Đoković 22; Rebs: Nenadić; Asts: Đoković 7 PIR: Đoković 26	Arena: Aleksandar Nikolić Hall; Attendance: 4,102; Referees: Ilija Belošević, Uroš Obrknežević, Uroš Nikolić

=== Radivoj Korać Cup ===
Win Loss

15 February 2018 Quarterfinals	Crvena zvezda mts	85–79(OT)	Borac Čačak	Niš
19:30	Scoring by quarter: 15–14, 21–16, 12–16, 23–25, Overtime: 14–8
	Pts: Feldeine, Rochestie 15; Rebs: Lessort 10; Asts: Rochestie 6 PIR: Lessort 23	Boxscore	Pts: Đoković 18; Rebs: Popović, Stojadinović 8 Asts: Đoković, Pešaković 3 PIR: Dimić 20	Arena: Čair Sports Center; Attendance: 4,000; Referees: Branislav Mrdak, Nemanja Ninković, Aleksandar Milojević

17 February 2018 Semifinals	Crvena zvezda mts	98–82	FMP	Niš
17:00	Scoring by quarter: 27–28, 24–16, 22–17, 25–21
	Pts: Ennis 20; Rebs: Lessort 5 Asts: Feldeine, Rochestie 5 PIR: Bjelica 24	Boxscore	Pts: Apić 21; Rebs: Ojo 6 Asts: Čović, Nenadić 5 PIR: Apić 25	Arena: Čair Sports Center; Attendance: 4,500; Referees: Milija Vojinović, Uroš Obrknežević, Aleksandar Glišić

18 February 2018 Final	Crvena zvezda mts	75–81	Partizan NIS	Niš
21:00	Scoring by quarter: 9–25, 22–24, 24–16, 20–16
	Pts: Dangubić, Bjelica 14; Rebs: Bjelica 6 Asts: Dangubić, Lessort 3 PIR: Bjelica 21	Boxscore	Pts: Williams-Goss 23; Rebs: Veličković 7 Asts: Williams-Goss 7 PIR: Williams-Goss 31	Arena: Čair Sports Center; Attendance: 5,000; Referees: Ilija Belošević, Milivoje Jovčić, Milija Vojinović

Source: National Cup

=== Adriatic Supercup ===
Crvena zvezda had canceled their participation at the Supercup, due to their previously scheduled Euroleague tournament (Crete Heraklion – 2nd International Basketball Tournament), which was held in the same period.

== Individual awards ==
=== EuroLeague ===
MVP of the Round

Round	Player	Efficiency	Ref.
26	(Dominican Republic) James Feldeine	32	

=== Adriatic League ===
MVP of the Round

Round	Player	Efficiency	Ref.
1	(France) Mathias Lessort	30	
7	(Montenegro) Milko Bjelica	35	
SF3	(Serbia) Ognjen Dobrić	23	
F2	(Slovenia) Alen Omić	27	

MVP of the Month

Month	Player	Ref.
November 2017	(Montenegro) Milko Bjelica	

Ideal Starting Five

Position	Player	Ref.
PG	(Montenegro) Taylor Rochestie	

=== Serbian League ===
	Player	Ref.
Finals MVP	(Slovenia) Alen Omić	
Finals Top Scorer	(Slovenia) Alen Omić	

== Statistics ==
Legend
GP	Games played	GS	Games started	MPG	Minutes per game
FG%	Field-goal percentage	3FG%	3-point field-goal percentage	FT%	Free-throw percentage
RPG	Rebounds per game	APG	Assists per game	SPG	Steals per game
BPG	Blocks per game	PPG	Points per game	PIR	PIR per game

Player	Left during season

=== Adriatic League ===
Player	GP	GS	MPG	FG%	3FG%	FT%	RPG	APG	SPG	BPG	PPG	PIR
Pero Antić	15	1	17.5	.296	.295	.756	5.0	0.8	0.5	0.1	6.7	8.3
Milko Bjelica	28	28	23.0	.458	.294	.832	3.7	1.6	0.6	0.2	9.8	11.5
Nemanja Dangubić	18	15	18.2	.411	.404	.844	2.8	0.9	0.3	0.0	6.7	6.6
Dejan Davidovac	23	4	16.2	.444	.333	.771	3.1	1.9	0.8	0.3	5.6	7.6
Ognjen Dobrić	24	3	18.2	.514	.472	.786	2.7	0.8	0.7	0.2	8.1	7.4
Dylan Ennis	18	0	14.2	.465	.458	.619	1.9	2.7	0.6	0.2	6.6	7.0
James Feldeine	26	17	25.1	.456	.434	.826	1.8	3.2	1.0	0.0	14.8	13.0
Stefan Janković	26	0	13.3	.505	.394	.714	3.0	0.4	0.4	0.6	5.5	4.8
Nikola Jovanović	16	1	10.8	.480	.000	.581	2.7	0.4	0.4	0.1	4.6	4.2
Marko Kešelj	7	0	7.4	.318	.267	.833	1.7	0.7	0.0	0.1	3.3	3.4
Branko Lazić	26	18	18.5	.395	.354	.778	2.1	0.9	0.8	0.1	3.8	3.5
Mathias Lessort	29	24	17.9	.671	.000	.608	4.4	0.6	0.9	0.9	8.8	11.8
Alen Omić	12	4	18.3	.671	.000	.509	5.1	1.8	0.4	0.3	10.9	14.3
Taylor Rochestie	28	28	25.8	.534	.478	.908	2.6	5.9	1.1	0.0	14.6	18.0
Dragan Apić	2	0	10.5	.857	.000	.667	3.5	0.5	0.5	0.0	7.0	9.5
Stefan Lazarević	6	1	7.3	.375	.000	.500	2.0	0.5	0.2	0.2	1.2	1.7
Nikola Radičević	9	1	12.0	.243	.231	.882	1.9	3.1	0.3	0.0	4.2	5.9

Last updated: April 14, 2018.
Source: ABA League

=== EuroLeague ===
Player	GP	GS	MPG	2FG%	3FG%	FT%	RPG	APG	SPG	BPG	PPG	PIR
Pero Antić	18	2	18:10	.429	.274	.771	3.4	1.1	0.7	0.1	6.2	6.2
Milko Bjelica	29	29	25:58	.459	.297	.703	3.7	1.3	0.4	0.2	9.2	8.8
Nemanja Dangubić	18	15	20:11	.471	.468	.800	3.4	1.2	0.7	0.1	7.4	6.7
Dejan Davidovac	24	6	15:38	.622	.468	.773	2.0	1.2	0.7	0.3	6.5	7.5
Ognjen Dobrić	26	1	15:12	.586	.351	.826	2.3	0.4	0.6	0.2	6.5	6.1
James Feldeine	28	17	24:57	.394	.345	.865	1.6	2.9	1.2	0.1	11.6	9.7
Dylan Ennis	18	0	13:00	.321	.400	.871	1.8	1.6	0.4	0.1	6.5	4.9
Stefan Janković	28	0	11:50	.493	.189	.842	2.5	0.5	0.4	0.4	3.8	3.3
Nikola Jovanović	16	0	8:04	.558	.333	.333	2.8	0.2	0.1	0.2	3.6	4.0
Marko Kešelj	6	0	6:00	.000	.000	.000	1.0	0.5	0.0	0.0	0.0	-0.3
Branko Lazić	30	21	20:22	.404	.259	.944	2.0	0.9	0.8	0.1	3.3	2.5
Mathias Lessort	30	29	21:05	.552	.000	.632	5.7	0.8	0.8	0.7	8.5	10.7
Alen Omić	11	0	17:21	.704	.000	.516	3.9	0.8	0.2	0.2	8.4	10.7
Taylor Rochestie	30	29	26:00	.551	.407	.891	2.3	5.0	0.8	0.1	13.4	14.4
Dragan Apić	3	0	5:34	1.000	.000	.000	0.0	0.0	0.0	0.0	1.3	-0.7
Stefan Lazarević	4	0	3:07	.500	.000	1.000	0.5	0.0	0.3	0.0	0.8	0.5
Nikola Radičević	9	1	12:20	.231	.167	.727	1.1	1.9	0.6	0.0	3.8	1.9

Last updated: April 5, 2018.
Source: EuroLeague

=== Serbian Super League ===
Player	GP	GS	MPG	2FG%	3FG%	FT%	RPG	APG	SPG	BPG	PPG	PIR
Pero Antić	9	0	16:22	.125	.242	.667	3.1	1.4	0.2	0.1	3.8	3.6
Filip Čović	17	0	19:30	.447	.355	.848	2.2	4.9	0.6	0.0	9.2	12.8
Nemanja Dangubić	Did not play											
Dejan Davidovac	17	10	23:09	.651	.300	.623	3.9	1.6	1.4	0.3	7.9	10.8
Ognjen Dobrić	14	4	21:35	.588	.377	.714	2.8	1.2	0.6	0.3	9.9	9.3
James Feldeine	16	5	21:13	.411	.387	.810	1.8	2.3	0.4	0.1	12.6	9.7
Stefan Janković	14	12	15:41	.689	.387	.565	3.7	1.0	0.4	0.7	7.9	8.3
Nikola Jovanović	14	0	9:21	.667	.000	.571	3.1	0.4	0.1	0.1	5.7	6.7
Marko Kešelj	8	0	15:35	.565	.280	.636	2.8	1.0	0.4	0.3	6.8	4.9
Branko Lazić	17	17	19:55	.625	.345	.778	3.3	1.5	0.7	0.0	5.9	6.5
Mathias Lessort	15	2	11:59	.567	.500	.657	3.8	0.4	0.7	0.3	4.0	6.1
Alen Omić	16	14	21:33	.727	.000	.585	7.0	1.5	0.6	0.6	12.4	18.9
Aleksa Radanov	14	4	12:01	.650	.333	.714	1.3	0.6	0.5	0.0	4.3	3.1
Taylor Rochestie	17	17	22:16	.487	.510	.900	1.8	5.9	0.9	0.1	11.1	15.2

Last updated: June 11, 2018.
Source: kls.rs

=== Radivoj Korać Cup ===
Player	GP	GS	MPG	2FG%	3FG%	FT%	RPG	APG	SPG	BPG	PPG	PIR
Pero Antić	1	0	6:39	.000	.000	.500	0.0	0.0	0.0	0.0	2.0	0.0
Milko Bjelica	3	3	27:21	.833	.333	.706	5.0	2.0	1.3	0.7	13.7	19.7
Nemanja Dangubić	3	3	19:01	.667	.286	.667	1.3	1.3	0.7	0.7	8.7	5.7
Dejan Davidovac	3	0	13:18	.000	.143	.833	1.7	0.0	0.3	0.0	2.7	1.3
Ognjen Dobrić	3	1	8:45	1.000	.667	.000	0.3	0.0	0.3	0.0	2.7	1.7
James Feldeine	3	0	24:31	.333	.154	1.000	2.7	2.0	2.0	0.0	9.7	9.3
Dylan Ennis	3	0	15:46	.556	.429	1.000	2.7	2.0	0.3	0.0	10.0	9.0
Stefan Janković	1	0	8:36	.667	.000	.667	3.0	0.0	0.0	1.0	6.0	9.0
Nikola Jovanović	Did not play											
Marko Kešelj	2	0	13:33	.000	.800	.000	2.5	2.5	0.0	0.0	6.0	6.0
Branko Lazić	3	2	19:10	.500	.429	1.000	1.3	0.3	0.7	0.3	5.7	3.7
Mathias Lessort	3	3	23:19	.800	.000	.538	6.3	1.7	1.0	2.0	7.7	16.3
Alen Omić	3	0	16:45	.778	.000	.600	2.7	0.7	0.3	0.0	6.7	8.3
Taylor Rochestie	3	3	26:14	.474	.333	.750	2.3	4.3	1.3	0.0	12.0	14.3

Last updated: February 18, 2018.
Source: National Cup

=== Head coaches records ===
Head coach	Competition	G	W	L	PF	PA	PD	Win %
Dušan Alimpijević	Adriatic League	22	19	3	1,955	1,679	+276	86.36
Dušan Alimpijević	Adriatic League Playoffs	7	3	4	558	514	+44	42.86
Dušan Alimpijević	Radivoj Korać Cup	3	2	1	258	242	+16	66.67
Dušan Alimpijević	EuroLeague	30	11	19	2,333	2,515	−182	36.67
Dušan Alimpijević	Serbian League	7	5	2	636	499	+137	71.43
Milenko Topić	Serbian League	3	3	0	267	236	+31	100.0
Milenko Topić	Serbian League Playoffs	7	7	0	615	500	+115	100.0

Updated: June 11, 2018

== See also ==
- List of Nike sponsorships
- 2017–18 Red Star Belgrade season
- 2017–18 KK Partizan season
