= 2017–18 Radivoj Korać Cup =

2018 Triglav osiguranje^{1} Radivoj Korać Cup
- Season: 2017–18
- Duration: 15–18 February 2018
- Games played: 7
- Teams: 8
- TV partner: Arena Sport

Regular season
- Season MVP: (United States) Nigel Williams-Goss

Finals
- Champions: Partizan NIS
- Runners-up: Crvena zvezda mts

Awards
- Top Scorer: (United States) Nigel Williams-Goss
- ^{1} Sponsored cup name, referring to Triglav Osiguranje a.d.o.

The 2018 Triglav osiguranje Radivoj Korać Cup was the 16th season of the Serbian men's national basketball cup tournament. The Žućko's left trophy awarded to the winner Partizan NIS from Belgrade.

== Venue ==
Niš	2017–18 Radivoj Korać Cup (Serbia)
Čair Sports Center	2017–18 Radivoj Korać Cup (Serbia)
Capacity: 5,000 expanded	2017–18 Radivoj Korać Cup (Serbia)

== Qualified teams ==
ABA League First Division	Basketball League of Serbia	Cup of Serbia (2nd-tier)
Crvena zvezda mts FMP; Mega Bemax; Partizan NIS	Borac Čačak (1st)^{1} Dynamic VIP PAY (2nd)^{1}	Zlatibor (Winner); Metalac (Runner-up)

^{1} League table position after 13 rounds played

=== Draw ===
The draw was held in Belgrade on 31 January 2018.

Seeded	Unseeded
Crvena zvezda mts	Borac Čačak
FMP	Dynamic VIP PAY
Mega Bemax	Metalac
Partizan NIS	Zlatibor

== Bracket ==
Quarterfinals
15 February
Crvena zvezda mts (OT)	85
Borac Čačak	79
15 February
FMP	101
Metalac	68
16 February
Partizan NIS	67
Zlatibor	54
16 February
Mega Bemax	94
Dynamic VIP PAY	79

Semifinals
17 February
Crvena zvezda mts	98
FMP	82
17 February
Partizan NIS	89
Mega Bemax	79

Final
18 February
Crvena zvezda mts	75
Partizan NIS	81

== Quarterfinals ==
=== FMP v Metalac ===
15 February 2018
17:00

Boxscore

FMP	101–68	Metalac
Scoring by quarter: 21–16, 23–18, 35–11, 22–23
Pts: Čović 18; Rebs: Ojo 9 Asts: Radanov 7		Pts: Đukanović 22; Rebs: three players 3 Asts: A. Vasić 7

Čair Sports Center, Niš
Attendance: 2,000
Referees: Vladimir Jevtović, Ivan Stefanović, Radoš Arsenijević

=== Crvena zvezda mts v Borac Čačak ===
15 February 2018
19:30

Boxscore

Crvena zvezda mts	85–79 (OT)	Borac Čačak
Scoring by quarter: 15–14, 21–16, 12–16, 23–25, Overtime: 14–8
Pts: Feldeine, Rochestie 15; Rebs: Lessort 10; Asts: Rochestie 6		Pts: Đoković 18; Rebs: Popović, Stojadinović 8 Asts: Đoković, Pešaković 3

Čair Sports Center, Niš
Attendance: 4,000
Referees: Branislav Mrdak, Nemanja Ninković, Aleksandar Milojević

=== Mega Bemax v Dynamic VIP PAY ===
16 February 2018
17:00

Boxscore

Mega Bemax	94–79	Dynamic VIP PAY
Scoring by quarter: 18–18, 35–19, 26–23, 15–19
Pts: Bitadze 17; Rebs: Bitadze 11; Asts: Sinovec, Jaramaz 4		Pts: Todorović 20; Rebs: Krstić, Todorović 5 Asts: Milisavljević 5

Čair Sports Center, Niš
Attendance: 1,500
Referees: Saša Maričić, Siniša Prpa, Vladimir Vesković

=== Partizan NIS v Zlatibor ===
16 February 2018
19:30

Boxscore

Partizan NIS	67–54	Zlatibor
Scoring by quarter: 17–14, 15–16, 21–8, 14–16
Pts: three players 10; Rebs: Williams-Goss 5 Asts: Vaughn 4		Pts: Gudžić 14; Rebs: Riznić 7 Asts: Popović, Papić 3

Čair Sports Center, Niš
Attendance: 4,000
Referees: Uroš Nikolić, Jasmina Juras, Marko Pecelj

== Semifinals ==
=== Crvena zvezda mts v FMP ===
17 February 2018
17:00

Boxscore

Crvena zvezda mts	98–82	FMP
Scoring by quarter: 27–28, 24–16, 22–17, 25–21
Pts: Ennis 20; Rebs: Lessort 5 Asts: Feldeine, Rochestie 5		Pts: Apić 21; Rebs: Ojo 6 Asts: Čović, Nenadić 5

Čair Sports Center, Niš
Attendance: 4,500
Referees: Milija Vojinović, Uroš Obrknežević, Aleksandar Glišić

=== Partizan NIS v Mega Bemax ===
17 February 2018
21:00

Boxscore

Partizan NIS	89–79	Mega Bemax
Scoring by quarter: 20–16, 22–25, 26–19, 21–19
Pts: Marinković 18; Rebs: Gagić 13; Asts: Williams-Goss, Veličković 8		Pts: Čančar 20; Rebs: Bitadze 8 Asts: Rebić 5

Čair Sports Center, Niš
Attendance: 4,500
Referees: Ilija Belošević, Milivoje Jovčić, Marko Juras

== Final ==
18 February 2018
21:00

Boxscore

Crvena zvezda mts	75–81	Partizan NIS
Scoring by quarter: 9–25, 22–24, 24–16, 20–16
Pts: Dangubić, Bjelica 14; Rebs: Bjelica 6 Asts: Dangubić, Lessort 3		Pts: Williams-Goss 23; Rebs: Veličković 7 Asts: Williams-Goss 7

Čair Sports Center, Niš
Attendance: 5,000
Referees: Ilija Belošević, Milivoje Jovčić, Milija Vojinović

Starters:			Pts	Reb	Ast
G	22	(Montenegro) Taylor Rochestie	7	2	2
G/F	10	(Serbia) Branko Lazić	4	3	0
SF	6	(Serbia) Nemanja Dangubić	14	0	3
F/C	51	(Montenegro) Milko Bjelica	14	6	2
F/C	26	(France) Mathias Lessort	4	4	3
Reserves:					
G/F	7	(Serbia) Dejan Davidovac	2	1	0
F/C	12	(North Macedonia) Pero Antić	2	0	0
G/F	13	(Serbia) Ognjen Dobrić	3	0	0
SG	14	(Dominican Republic) James Feldeine	7	2	1
F/C	16	(Serbia) Stefan Janković	6	3	0
C	23	(Slovenia) Alen Omić	2	1	0
PG	31	(Jamaica) Dylan Ennis	10	3	0
Head coach:
(Serbia) Dušan Alimpijević

Crvena zvezda	Partizan

2018 Radivoj Korać Cup Champions
Partizan NIS
14th title
MVP
(United States) Nigel Williams-Goss

Starters:			Pts	Reb	Ast
PG	3	(United States) Nigel Williams-Goss	23	3	7
SG	9	(Serbia) Vanja Marinković	10	3	0
F	5	(France) Bandja Sy	5	6	0
PF	12	(Serbia) Novica Veličković	13	7	1
C	41	(Serbia) Đorđe Gagić	12	6	1
Reserves:					
G	4	(United States) Kwame Vaughn	6	2	2
PG	6	(Serbia) Tadija Tadić	DNP		
SG	7	(Serbia) Aleksandar Aranitović	7	2	0
SF	10	(Serbia) Nikola Tanasković	DNP		
PF	17	(Serbia) Strahinja Gavrilović	DNP		
SF	21	(Serbia) Mihajlo Andrić	3	1	1
C	95	(Serbia) Đoko Šalić	2	2	0
Head coach:
(Serbia) Nenad Čanak

== See also ==
- 2017–18 Basketball League of Serbia season
- 2017 ABA League Supercup
- 2017–18 Milan Ciga Vasojević Cup

Teams

- 2017–18 KK Crvena zvezda season
- 2017–18 KK Partizan season
