= Slobodan Ljubotina =

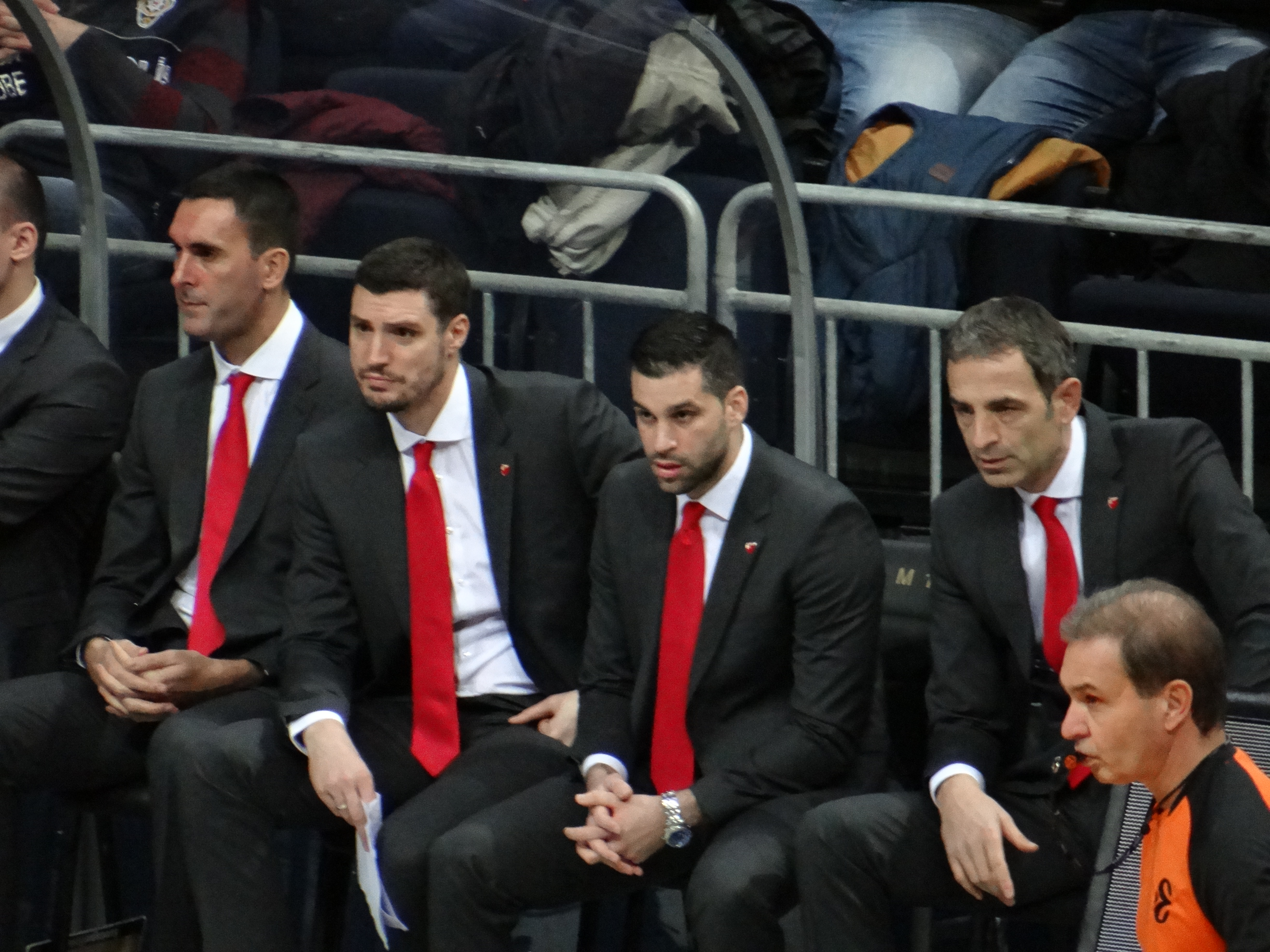
- Ljubotina with Crvena zvezda in 2017.

Spartak Subotica
- Title: Assistant coach
- League: Serbian League; ABA League

Personal information
- Born: 11 January 1984 (age 42) Otočac, SR Croatia, SFR Yugoslavia
- Listed height: 2.07 m (6 ft 9 in)
- Listed weight: 105 kg (231 lb)

Career information
- NBA draft: 2006: undrafted
- Playing career: 2000–2013
- Position: Power forward / center
- Number: 6, 9
- Coaching career: 2014–present

Career history

Playing
- 2000–2005: Spartak Subotica
- 2005–2006: Avala Ada
- 2006: Union Olimpija
- 2006–2008: Turów Zgorzelec
- 2008: Oostende
- 2008–2009: Vojvodina Srbijagas
- 2009–2010: Politekhnika-Halychyna
- 2010–2011: Trefl Sopot
- 2011–2013: Spartak Subotica
- 2013: Crnokosa

Coaching
- 2015–2017: Spartak Subotica (assistant)
- 2017: FMP (assistant)
- 2017–2018: Crvena zvezda (assistant)
- 2018–2019: Spartak Subotica
- 2019–present: Spartak Subotica (assistant)

Career highlights
- As player: Slovenian League champion (2006)

Slobodan Ljubotina (Serbian Cyrillic: Слободан Љуботина; born 11 January 1984) is a Serbian professional basketball coach and former player. He is currently the assistant coach for Spartak Subotica of the Serbian League and the ABA League.

== Playing career ==
Ljubotina started his basketball career with Spartak Subotica, making his debut in the YUBA League during the 2001–02 season. In July 2005, he signed with Crvena zvezda but later left the club before appearing in a game for them. He started the 2005–06 season with Avala Ada and in March 2006 he moved to Union Olimpija with whom he won the 2006 Slovenian League championship.

From 2006 to 2008 he played with Polish club Turów Zgorzelec. The 2008–09 season he started with Oostende but after only five games he was released and then in November 2008 he moved to Vojvodina Srbijagas where he spent the rest of the season. For the 2009–10 season he moved to Politekhnika-Halychyna in Ukraine. For the 2010–11 season he returned to Poland and signed with Trefl Sopot. In 2011–12 and 2012–13 season he played for Spartak Subotica in the Serbian B League. His last club was Crnokosa from Kosjerić where he played till December 2013.

== Coaching career ==
Ljubotina started his coaching career with Spartak Subotica junior teams (U12, U17 and U19). From August 2015 till April 2017 he worked as an assistant coach of Spartak. After Spartak first coach Dušan Alimpijević moved to FMP Beograd Ljubotina also goes with him. In July 2017, Alimpijević was named as the head coach of Crvena zvezda, and Ljubotina also moved to Crvena zvezda to be an assistant coach.

In August 2018, Ljubotina was named a head coach for Spartak Subotica of the Basketball League of Serbia. Spartak parted ways with him in January 2019.

== Career achievements ==
As player

- Slovenian League champion: 1 (with Union Olimpija: 2005–06)

As assistant coach

- Serbian League champion: 1 (with Crvena zvezda: 2017–18)
