= Aleksandar Zarić =

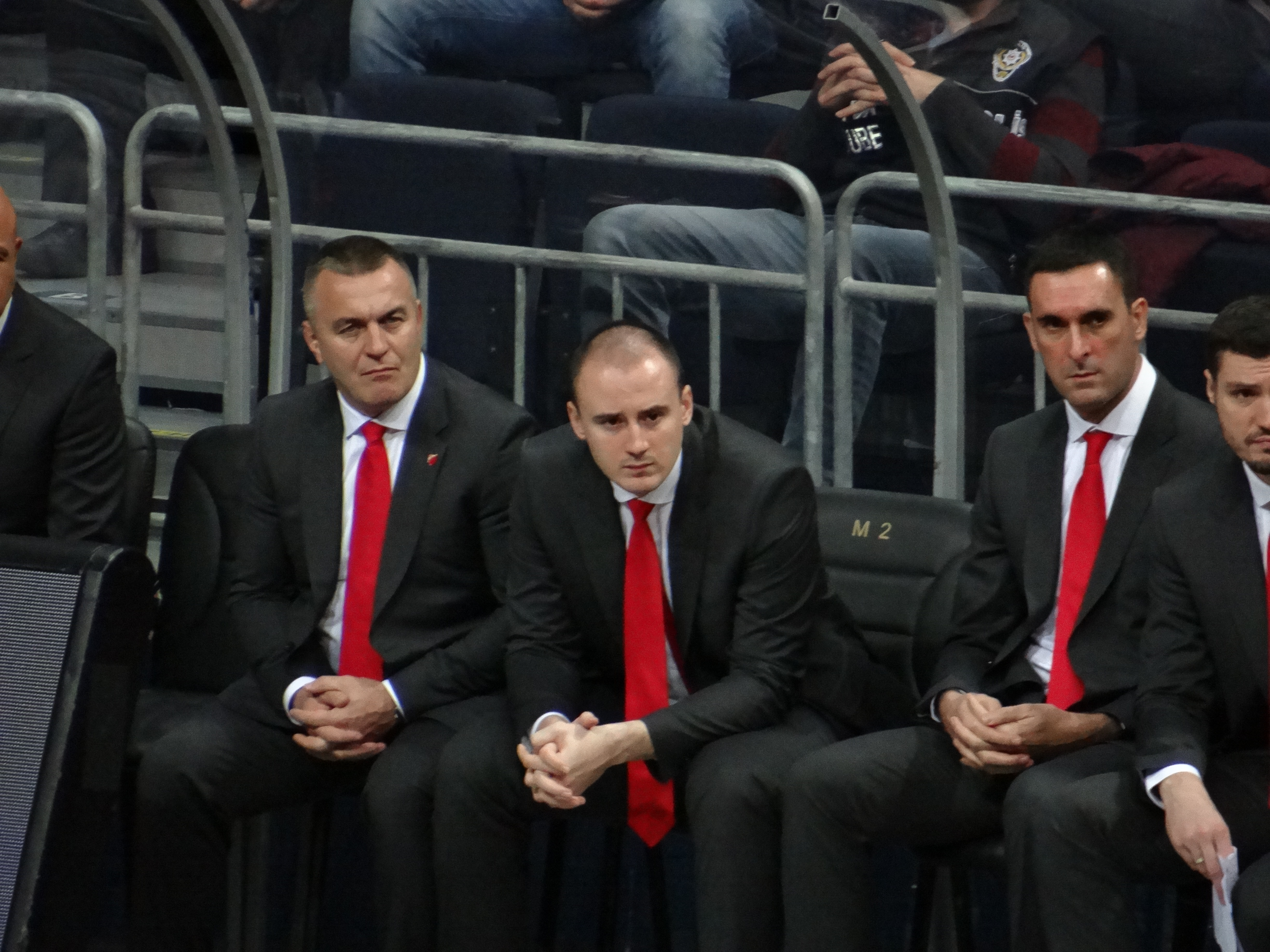
- Zarić with Crvena zvezda in 2017.

FMP
- Title: Sporting director
- League: ABA League; Basketball League of Serbia

Personal information
- Born: 20 March 1989 (age 37) Slavonski Brod, SR Croatia, SFR Yugoslavia
- Listed height: 1.97 m (6 ft 6 in)
- Listed weight: 90 kg (198 lb)

Career information
- NBA draft: 2011: undrafted
- Playing career: 2007–2016
- Position: Shooting guard
- Number: 4, 14
- Coaching career: 2016–present

Career history

Playing
- 2009–2013: Radnički FMP
- 2013–2015: OKK Beograd
- 2015–2016: Beovuk 72

Coaching
- 2016–2017: FMP (assistant)
- 2017–2018: Crvena zvezda (assistant)
- 2018–2021: FMP (assistant)

Aleksandar Zarić (Serbian Cyrillic: Александар Зарић; born 20 March 1989) is a Serbian professional basketball coach and former player who is the sporting director for FMP of the Basketball League of Serbia and the ABA League.

== Playing career ==
Zarić played for the FMP Železnik U18 team that lost from the Žalgiris U18 in the 2007 Junior Euroleague Final.

Zarić played for Radnički FMP, OKK Beograd, Beovuk 72 of the Basketball League of Serbia. During his sting with OKK Beograd, he played 42 games over two seasons averaging 2.4 points per game.

== Coaching career ==
Zarić started his coaching career with FMP as a staff member of head coach Dušan Alimpijević. In July 2017, Alimpijević was named as the head coach of Crvena zvezda, and Zarić moved to Crvena zvezda to be an assistant coach. In 2018, he joined back to the FMP staff. In 2021, FMP promoted him as their new sporting director.

== Career achievements ==
As assistant coach

- Serbian League champion: 1 (with Crvena zvezda: 2017–18)
