= Nikola Jovanović (basketball, born 1994) =

Serbian basketball player

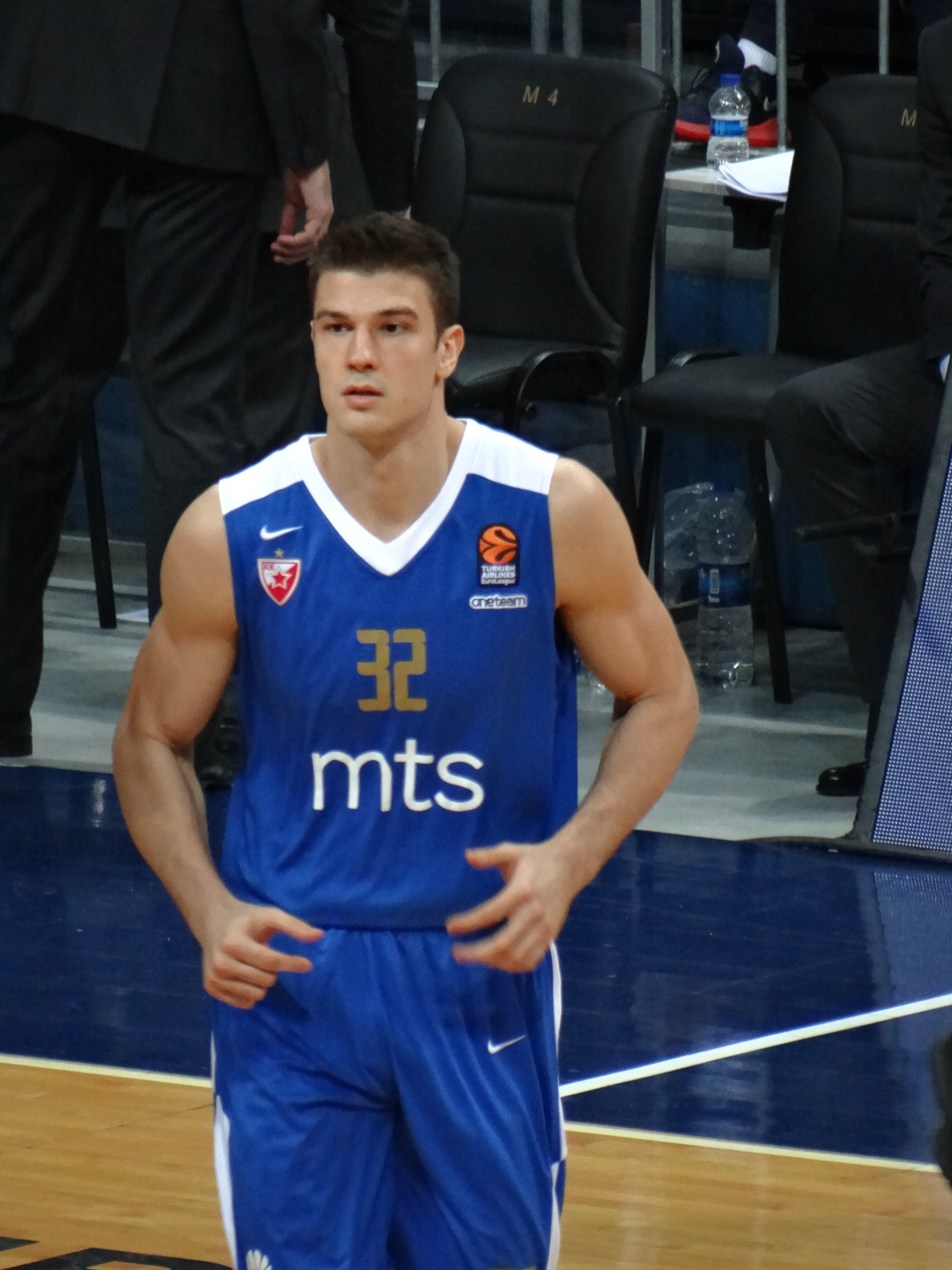
- Jovanović with Crvena zvezda in 2017

No. 10 – BC Vienna
- Position: Power forward / center
- League: Austrian Basketball Superliga; ABA League

Personal information
- Born: January 6, 1994 (age 32) Belgrade, Serbia, FR Yugoslavia
- Listed height: 2.11 m (6 ft 11 in)
- Listed weight: 113 kg (249 lb)

Career information
- High school: Arlington Country Day School (Jacksonville, Florida)
- College: USC (2013–2016)
- NBA draft: 2016: undrafted
- Playing career: 2016–present

Career history
- 2016–2017: Grand Rapids Drive
- 2017: Westchester Knicks
- 2017–2021: Crvena zvezda
- 2018–2019: →Aquila Basket Trento
- 2020–2021: →Igokea
- 2021, 2022–2023: Nizhny Novgorod
- 2023: Oostende
- 2023–2024: Antwerp Giants
- 2024: Halcones de Xalapa
- 2024–2025: Scafati Basket
- 2025–2026: Limoges CSP
- 2026–present: BC Vienna

Career highlights
- BNXT Sixth Man of the Year (2024); BNXT League Dream Team (2024); Belgian League champion (2023); Bosnian Cup winner (2021); Serbian League champion (2018)
- Stats at Basketball Reference

Nikola Jovanović (Serbian Cyrillic: Никола Јовановић, born January 6, 1994) is a Serbian professional basketball player for BC Vienna of the Austrian Basketball Superliga and the ABA League. He played college basketball for the USC Trojans.

== Early life ==
Growing up in Serbia, Jovanović played basketball for the junior cadet teams of KK Crvena zvezda (2010–11) and KK Partizan (2011–12). After moving to the United States in 2012, he enrolled at Arlington Country Day School in Jacksonville, Florida. In 2012–13, he averaged 15 points and 12 rebounds while leading the Apaches to a 30–4 record and a No. 2 ranking in the state of Florida. He was ranked at the No. 20 prospect in the state of Florida by Florida Hoops.

== College career ==
=== Freshman year ===
As a freshman at USC in 2013–14, Jovanović averaged 8.0 points and 4.4 rebounds while making 24 starts and appearing in all 32 games. He made 76.1 percent of his free throws, which was eighth-best all-time by a Trojan freshman, and hit 51.6 percent of his field goals, which were 10th best by a USC freshman all-time. He scored a season-high 23 points on 8-of-10 shooting against California on January 22, 2014. He was bestowed the Harold Jones Award at the team banquet following the season as the team's Most Improved Player.

=== Sophomore year ===
As a sophomore in 2014–15, Jovanović showed improvement in almost every area, leading the team with an average of 7.0 rebounds per game and finishing second in scoring with a 12.3 average. He started 31 of USC's 32 games and played in each contest. On January 29, 2015, he scored a career-high 30 points in USC's triple-overtime 98–94 loss to Colorado. He earned the Bob Boyd Award as the team's top rebounder, given out at the USC Men's Basketball Awards Banquet following the season.

=== Junior year ===
As a junior in 2015–16, Jovanović averaged 12.1 points and 7.0 rebounds for a Trojans team that had a better-than-expected season and earned a spot in the NCAA tournament. On January 30, 2016, he scored a season-high 28 points against Washington. On February 28, he became the 36th Trojan to score 1,000 points or more in his USC men's basketball career. He earned the Bob Boyd Award as the team's top rebounder for the second consecutive year.

On April 14, 2016, Jovanović declared for the NBA draft, forgoing his final year of college eligibility.

== Professional career ==
=== NBA Development League ===
After going undrafted in the 2016 NBA draft, Jovanović joined the Detroit Pistons for the Orlando Summer League and the Los Angeles Lakers for the Las Vegas Summer League. On September 26, 2016, he signed with the Pistons, but was waived on October 17 after appearing in one preseason game. On October 30, he was acquired by the Grand Rapids Drive of the NBA Development League, an affiliate of the Pistons. On March 2, 2017, Jovanović was traded to the Westchester Knicks.

=== Crvena zvezda and loans ===
On July 29, 2017, Jovanović signed a three-year deal with Serbian club Crvena zvezda. On August 13, 2018, Jovanović moved on loan to the Italian club Aquila Basket Trento for the 2018–19 season. After the year-long loan in Italy, Jovanović signed a new contract with Zvezda on August 28, 2019. On August 6, 2020, Jovanović moved on loan to the Bosnian club Igokea for the 2020–21 season.

=== Nizhny Novgorod ===
On September 14, 2021, Jovanović signed a deal with Russian club Nizhny Novgorod. He parted ways with Nizhny in December 2021.

=== Filou Oostende ===
On March 3, 2023, he signed with Oostende of the BNXT League.

=== Scafati Basket ===
On December 13, 2024, he signed with Scafati Basket of the Lega Basket Serie A.

=== Limoges CSP ===
On June 24, 2025, he signed with Limoges CSP of the LNB Pro A.

=== BC Vienna ===
In 2026, Jovanović signed with Austrian club BC Vienna of the Austrian Basketball Superliga and the regional ABA League.

== Career statistics ==
Legend
| GP | Games played | GS | Games started | MPG | Minutes per game |
| FG% | Field-goal percentage | 3P% | 3-point field-goal percentage | FT% | Free-throw percentage |
| RPG | Rebounds per game | APG | Assists per game | SPG | Steals per game |
| BPG | Blocks per game | PPG | Points per game | PIR | Performance index rating |
| **Bold** | Career high |

=== Euroleague ===
| Year | Team | GP | GS | MPG | FG% | 3P% | FT% | RPG | APG | SPG | BPG | PPG | PIR |
|---|---|---|---|---|---|---|---|---|---|---|---|---|---|
| 2017–18 | Crvena zvezda | 16 | 0 | 8.1 | .543 | .333 | .333 | 2.8 | .2 | .1 | .2 | 3.6 | 4.0 |
| Career | | 16 | 0 | 8.1 | .543 | .333 | .333 | 2.8 | .2 | .1 | .2 | 3.6 | 4.0 |

== Personal life ==
Jovanović is fluent in Serbian, French and English.

== See also ==
- List of Serbian NBA Summer League players
