= Dragan Apić =

Serbian basketball player

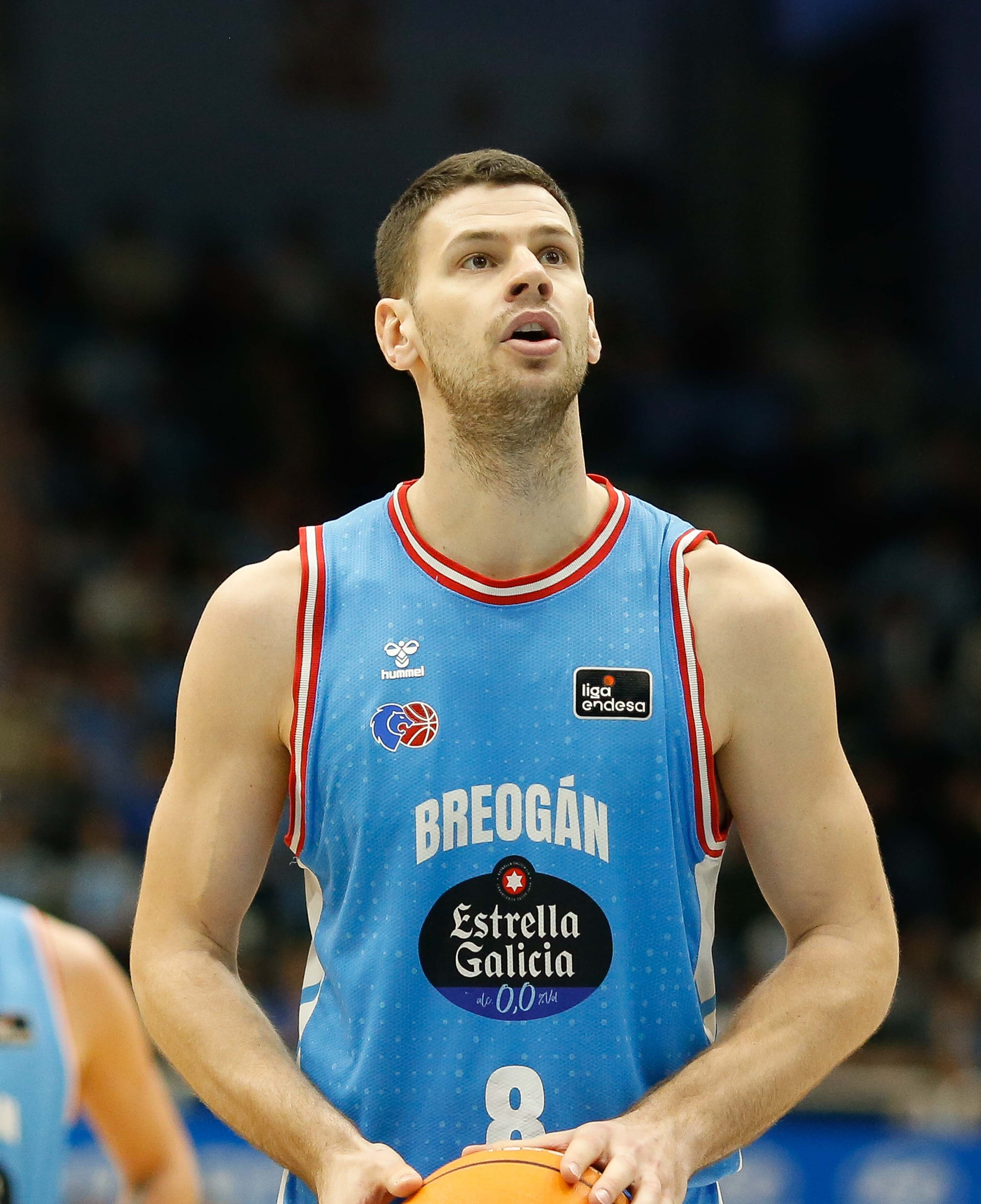
- Apić with Breogán in 2025

No. 8 – Soles de Mexicali
- Position: Center / power forward
- League: LNBP

Personal information
- Born: 3 October 1995 (age 31) Novi Sad, Serbia, FR Yugoslavia
- Listed height: 2.06 m (6 ft 9 in)
- Listed weight: 105 kg (231 lb)

Career information
- NBA draft: 2017: undrafted
- Playing career: 2012–present

Career history
- 2012–2015: Vršac
- 2015–2019: Crvena zvezda
- 2015–2018: →FMP
- 2019–2020: Lokomotiv Kuban
- 2020: →San Pablo Burgos
- 2020–2021: Budućnost
- 2021–2022: Zielona Góra
- 2022–2024: Nizhny Novgorod
- 2024–2026: Breogán
- 2026–present: Soles de Mexicali

Career highlights
- Montenegrin League champion (2021); Montenegrin Cup winner (2021); ABA League Top Scorer (2019); All-Polish League Team (2022)
Medals
Men's basketball
Representing Serbia
U20 European Championship
| Gold medal – first place | 2015 Italy | Team |

Dragan Apić (Serbian Cyrillic: Драган Апић; born 3 October 1995) is a Serbian professional basketball player for Soles de Mexicali of the Liga Nacional de Baloncesto Profesional (LNBP). He has previously played Breogán of the Liga ACB.

== Professional career ==
In March 2015, Apić signed for Crvena zvezda Telekom and was immediately loaned to FMP, just before the start of the Serbian Super League season, after spending inaugural years of his career in Vršac. On 13 September 2017, Apić signed a four-year contract for Crvena zvezda. On 14 December 2017, he was loaded out to FMP for the rest of the 2017–18 season. In the 2018–19 season, Apić was named Adriatic League Player of the Month for November and December.

On 19 January 2019, Apić signed a four-year contract with the Russian club Lokomotiv Kuban. In January 2020, he was loaned to San Pablo Burgos of the Spanish Liga ACB for the rest of the 2019–20 season.

On 4 July 2020, Apić signed a two-year contract with the Bosnian team Igokea. Ten days later, however, he parted ways with Igokea and signed a two-year contract with the Montenegrin team Budućnost VOLI. On 12 July 2021, he has signed with Stelmet Zielona Góra of the PLK.

On July 7, 2022, he signed with Nizhny Novgorod of the VTB United League.

On June 10, 2024, he signed with Río Breogán of the Liga ACB.

== Career statistics ==
Legend
| GP | Games played | GS | Games started | MPG | Minutes per game |
| FG% | Field-goal percentage | 3P% | 3-point field-goal percentage | FT% | Free-throw percentage |
| RPG | Rebounds per game | APG | Assists per game | SPG | Steals per game |
| BPG | Blocks per game | PPG | Points per game | PIR | Performance index rating |
| **Bold** | Career high |

=== Euroleague ===
| Year | Team | GP | GS | MPG | FG% | 3P% | FT% | RPG | APG | SPG | BPG | PPG | PIR |
|---|---|---|---|---|---|---|---|---|---|---|---|---|---|
| 2017–18 | Crvena zvezda | 3 | 0 | 5.6 | 1.000 | .000 | .000 | .0 | .0 | .0 | .0 | 1.3 | -.7 |
| Career | | 3 | 0 | 5.6 | 1.000 | .000 | .000 | .0 | .0 | .0 | .0 | 1.3 | -.7 |
