= Robert Rikić =

Croatian basketball player

Rabotnički
- Position: Center
- League: Macedonian League

Personal information
- Born: April 29, 1990 (age 36) Mostar, SR Bosnia and Herzegovina, SFR Yugoslavia
- Listed height: 2.19 m (7 ft 2 in)
- Listed weight: 120 kg (265 lb)

Career information
- NBA draft: 2012: undrafted
- Playing career: 2008–present

Career history
- 2008–2012: Zagreb
- 2008–2010: →Zrinjevac
- 2010–2011: →Dubrava
- 2012–2014: Široki Primorka
- 2014–2016: Budućnost Podgorica
- 2016–2019: Igokea
- 2019: Zrinjski Mostar
- 2019: Split
- 2019–2020: Sloboda Tuzla
- 2020–2021: USK Praha
- 2021: EuroNickel 2005
- 2021–2022: MZT Skopje
- 2022–2023: BK JIP Pardubice
- 2023–2024: Rabotnički
- 2024–2025: Bashkimi
- 2025: Cibona
- 2025–present: Rabotnički

Career highlights
- Montenegrin League champion (2015); Bosnian League champion (2017); Macedonian League champion (2022); 4× Bosnian Cup winner (2014, 2017–2019); 2× Montenegrin Cup winner (2015, 2016)
Medals
Men's basketball
Representing Croatia
European U-18 Championship
Bronze medal – third place	2008 Greece	U-18 Team

Robert Rikić (born 29 April 1990) is a Croatian professional basketball player who plays for Rabotnički. Standing at 2.19 m, he plays at the center position.

== Career ==
Rikić started practicing basketball as a 16-year-old, after already becoming an under-16 national handball player for Croatia. After initially working individually with Široki's youth coaches, his first youth club was Dubrovnik, where he stayed for a year before moving to Zagreb. In August 2014 he moved to KK Budućnost Podgorica. During the first few years of his career, Rikić was also an under-18 national team member for Croatia.

Rikić spent the 2019–20 season with Sloboda Tuzla, averaging 13.9 points, 8.0 rebounds, and 1.1 blocks per game in ABA league play. On October 17, 2020, Rikic signed with USK Praha of the Czech National Basketball League.
