= Nikola Pešaković =

Serbian professional basketball player (born 1991)

Vojvodina
- Position: Shooting guard
- League: Basketball League of Serbia

Personal information
- Born: April 16, 1991 (age 35) Čačak, SFR Yugoslavia
- Listed height: 1.93 m (6 ft 4 in)
- Listed weight: 84 kg (185 lb)

Career information
- NBA draft: 2013: undrafted
- Playing career: 2009–present

Career history
- 2009–2011: Borac Čačak
- 2011–2012: Partizan
- 2012: → Borac Čačak
- 2012–2013: Vojvodina Srbijagas
- 2013–2014: Borac Čačak
- 2014–2015: Nea Kifissia
- 2015–2017: Igokea
- 2017–2018: Borac Čačak
- 2018–2020: Timișoara
- 2020–2021: KTE-Duna Aszfalt
- 2021–2022: Královští Sokoli Hradec Králové
- 2022–present: Vojvodina

Career highlights
- 2× Bosnian League champion (2016, 2017); 2× Bosnian Cup winner (2016, 2017)

Nikola Pešaković (Serbian Cyrillic: Никола Пешаковић; born April 16, 1991) is a Serbian professional basketball player for Vojvodina of the Basketball League of Serbia. Standing at 1.93 m (6 ft 4 in), he plays at the shooting guard position.

== Professional career ==
Pešaković began his professional career with Borac Čačak in the 2009–10 season. In March 2011, Pešaković signed a four-year contract with Partizan. In January 2012, Pešaković was loaned to Borac Čačak until the end of the 2011–12 season.

In August 2012, Pešaković signed a one-year-plus-one-year contract with Vojvodina Srbijagas. In September 2013, he returned to his former club Borac Čačak. For the 2014–15 season, he signed with the Greek team Nea Kifissia. He averaged 6.2 points per game over the season.

On September 30, 2015, he signed a contract with the Bosnian team Igokea. He debuted for the team in 67–56 loss to Cedevita Zagreb in Round 1 of the ABA League, scoring 3 points in 13 minutes of action. After miserable performances in the beginning of the season, he scored season-high 18 points in a 75–58 victory over Sutjeska.
