= Ilija Đoković =

Serbian basketball player (born 1996)

ÍA
- Position: Guard
- League: Úrvalsdeild karla

Personal information
- Born: 5 January 1996 (age 30) Jagodina, FR Yugoslavia
- Listed height: 1.88 m (6 ft 2 in)
- Listed weight: 88 kg (194 lb)

Career information
- Playing career: 2012–present

Career history
- 2012–2015: Jagodina
- 2015–2016: FMP
- 2016–2019: Borac Čačak
- 2019–2020: FMP
- 2020–2021: Split
- 2021–2022: Borac Čačak
- 2022–2023: SCM Timișoara
- 2023–2024: Budapesti Honved SE
- 2024–2025: Mornar Barsko zlato
- 2025: KK Jahorina Pale
- 2025–present: ÍA
Medals
Men's basketball
Representing Serbia
U18 European Championship
Silver medal – second place	2014 Turkey	Team
FIBA Europe Under-16 Championship
Bronze medal – third place	2012 Lithuania & Latvia	Team

Ilija Đoković (Serbian Cyrillic: Илија Ђоковић, born 5 January 1996) is a Serbian professional basketball player.

== Professional career ==
Đoković started playing professional basketball for his hometown club Jagodina in the 2012–13 season. He stayed there for three seasons and signed with FMP in March 2015, just before the final round of the Serbian First League season. During the 2015–16 season with FMP Belgrade, he averaged 6.4 points, 3.2 assists and 1.7 rebounds over 39 games.

In the summer of 2016, Đoković signed a contract with Borac Čačak. In 2016–17 season, his first season with the club, he averaged 7.5 points, 2.7 assists and 1.8 rebounds over 40 domestic league games. In 2017–18 season, he averaged 11.1 points, 4.6 assists and 2.8 rebounds over 31 domestic league games. Also, in 21 games of the regional ABA League Second Division, he averaged 15.7 points, 5.1 assists, and 3.1 rebounds per game. In 2018–19 season, he averaged 13.3 points 5 assists and 3 rebounds in 24 ABA League Second Division games with Borac.

In August 2019, Đoković signed back a two-year contract for FMP. In July 2020, he signed one year deal with the Croatian team Split. In December 2022, he suffered a shoulder injury, which kept him off the court for three months. Over 2020–21 season, Đoković appeared in only 10 ABA League games with Split, averaging 6.4 points on 38.2% shooting from the field.

In September 2021, Đoković returned to Borac Čačak. In his comeback season with Borac, Đoković averaged 5 points and 2.6 assists over 25 ABA League games, while shooting 31% from the field For 2022–23 season, Đoković signed a contract with the Romanian club SCM Timișoara.

In October 2025, Đoković signed with ÍA of the Icelandic Úrvalsdeild karla.

== National team career ==
Đoković was a member of Serbia national U18 team that won silver at the 2014 FIBA Europe Under-18 Championship.

Đoković represented the Serbian men's university basketball team at the 2017 Universiade held in Taiwan. In the tournament, Serbia was defeated by the United States in the semifinal game and eventually lost in the bronze-medal game to Latvia with 81–74. The Basketball Federation of Serbia stated that a total of 24 talented young players refused to play for the Universiade Team Serbia, the highest in history. However, despite many refusals to represent Serbia, the weakened roster made big success by getting the fourth place in the tournament. Đoković was invited in the last minutes to form the latest spot and eventually was one of the team leaders.

In November 2017, Đoković was invited by the senior national team head coach Aleksandar Đorđević to represent Serbia in the 2019 World Cup qualifications. He made his debut for the senior national team on 25 November 2017, in a game against Austria.
