= Filip Čović =

Serbian basketball player

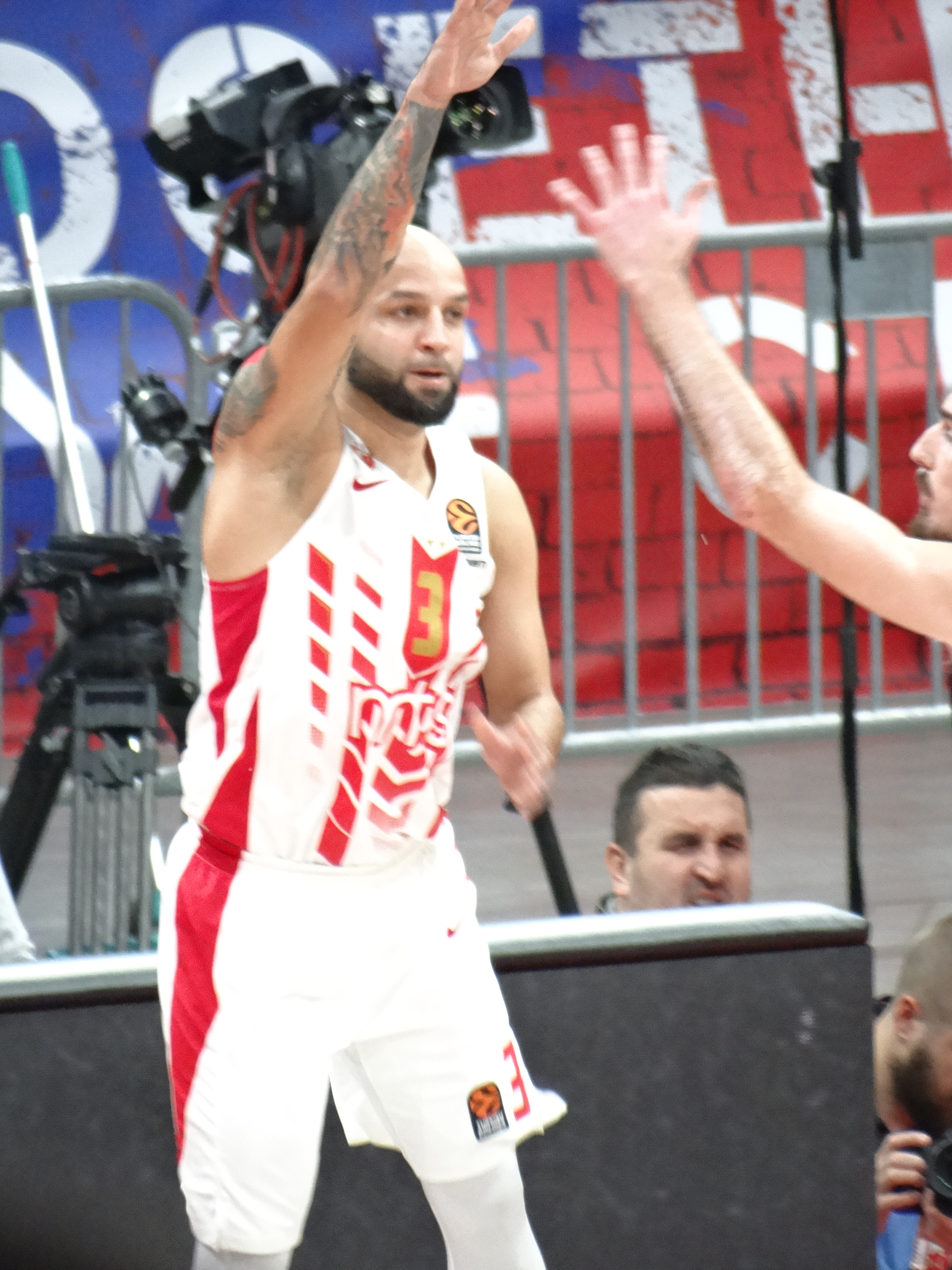
- Čović playing for Crvena zvezda in October 2019.

FMP
- Title: Director
- League: ABA League; Basketball League of Serbia

Personal information
- Born: June 5, 1989 (age 37) Belgrade, SR Serbia, SFR Yugoslavia
- Listed height: 1.78 m (5 ft 10 in)
- Listed weight: 75 kg (165 lb)

Career information
- NBA draft: 2011: undrafted
- Playing career: 2006–2021
- Position: Point guard
- Number: 3, 4

Career history
- 2006–2011: FMP Železnik
- 2011–2012: Crvena zvezda
- 2013: Vojvodina Srbijagas
- 2013: K.A.O.D
- 2013–2018: FMP
- 2018–2021: Crvena zvezda
- 2020–2021: →FMP
Medals
Men's basketball
Representing Serbia
Mediterranean Games
Silver medal – second place	2013 Mersin	Team competition
U18 European Championship
Gold medal – first place	2007 Spain	U18 National Team

Filip Čović (Serbian Cyrillic: Филип Човић; born 5 June 1989) is a Serbian professional basketball executive and former player who is a director for FMP of the Basketball League of Serbia and the ABA League.

== Professional career ==
A product of the FMP's youth system, Čović spent the first five years of his career playing for their senior side, and a further year and a half playing for Crvena zvezda.

In January 2013, Čović signed for Vojvodina Srbijagas for the remainder of the season. In August 2013, Čović signed for KAOD Dramas of the Greek Basket League, but left the club in December citing personal reasons. Shortly afterwards, he returned to his former club FMP, signing a multi-year contract with them.

In April 2018, Čović signed with Crvena zvezda. On June 25, 2019, Čović signed a two-year extension with Crvena zvezda. In February 2020, he was loaned to FMP for the rest of the 2019–20 season. In his final 2020–21 season, over 23 ABA League games, Čović averaged 11.6 points, 6.7 assists and 2.1 rebounds, while shooting 33.7% from the field.

On 20 May 2021, Čović announced his intentions to retire after the 2021 Serbia League Playoffs. After FMP failed to advance to semifinals Čović retired from professional basketball at age 31.

== National team career ==
Čović was a member of the Serbia and Montenegro national under-16 team at the 2005 FIBA Europe Under-16 Championship in León, Spain. Over four tournament games, he averaged 3.5 points and 1.2 assists per game.

Čović was a member of the Serbia U18 national team that won the gold medal at the 2007 FIBA Europe Under-18 Championship in Madrid, Spain. Over eight tournament games, he averaged 6.4 points, 2.5 rebounds, and 3.5 assists per game. He was a member of the U20 Serbia team at the 2009 FIBA Europe Under-20 Championship in Rhodes and Ialysos, Greece. Over five tournament games, he averaged 9.4 points, four rebounds, and 3.2 assists per game.

Čović was a member of the Serbia national team that won the silver medal at the 2013 Mediterranean Games in Mersin, Turkey.

== Career achievements ==
- Adriatic League champion: 1 (with Crvena zvezda: 2018–19)
- Serbian League champion: 2 (with Crvena zvezda: 2017–18, 2018–19)
- Adriatic Supercup winner: 1 (with Crvena zvezda: 2018)
- Serbian Cup winner: 1 (with FMP Železnik: 2007)

== Post-playing career ==
After retirement in 2021, Čović joined a managing staff of FMP as a director.

== Personal life ==
His father Nebojša Čović is the current president of the Crvena zvezda men's basketball club. His father is a former politician who served as a Deputy Prime Minister of Serbia (2001–2004) and a Mayor of Belgrade (1994–1997).
