= Dušan Alimpijević =

Serbian basketball coach (born 1986)

- Alimpijević coaching Beşiktaş in 2026.

Beşiktaş Fuzul
- Position: Head coach
- League: Basketbol Süper Ligi; EuroLeague

Personal information
- Born: 9 March 1986 (age 40) Lazarevac, SR Serbia, SFR Yugoslavia

Career information
- Coaching career: 2008–present

Career history

Coaching
- 2008–2011: Novi Sad (assistant)
- 2011–2013: Vojvodina Srbijagas (assistant)
- 2013–2015: Vojvodina Srbijagas
- 2015–2017: Spartak Subotica
- 2017: FMP
- 2017–2018: Crvena zvezda
- 2018–2019: Avtodor
- 2020–2023: Frutti Extra Bursaspor
- 2023–present: Beşiktaş
- 2025–present: Serbia

Career highlights
- 2× EuroCup Coach of the Year (2022, 2026)
Medals
Men's basketball
Assistant coach for Serbia
U20 European Championship
Bronze medal – third place	2014 Greece	U20 Team

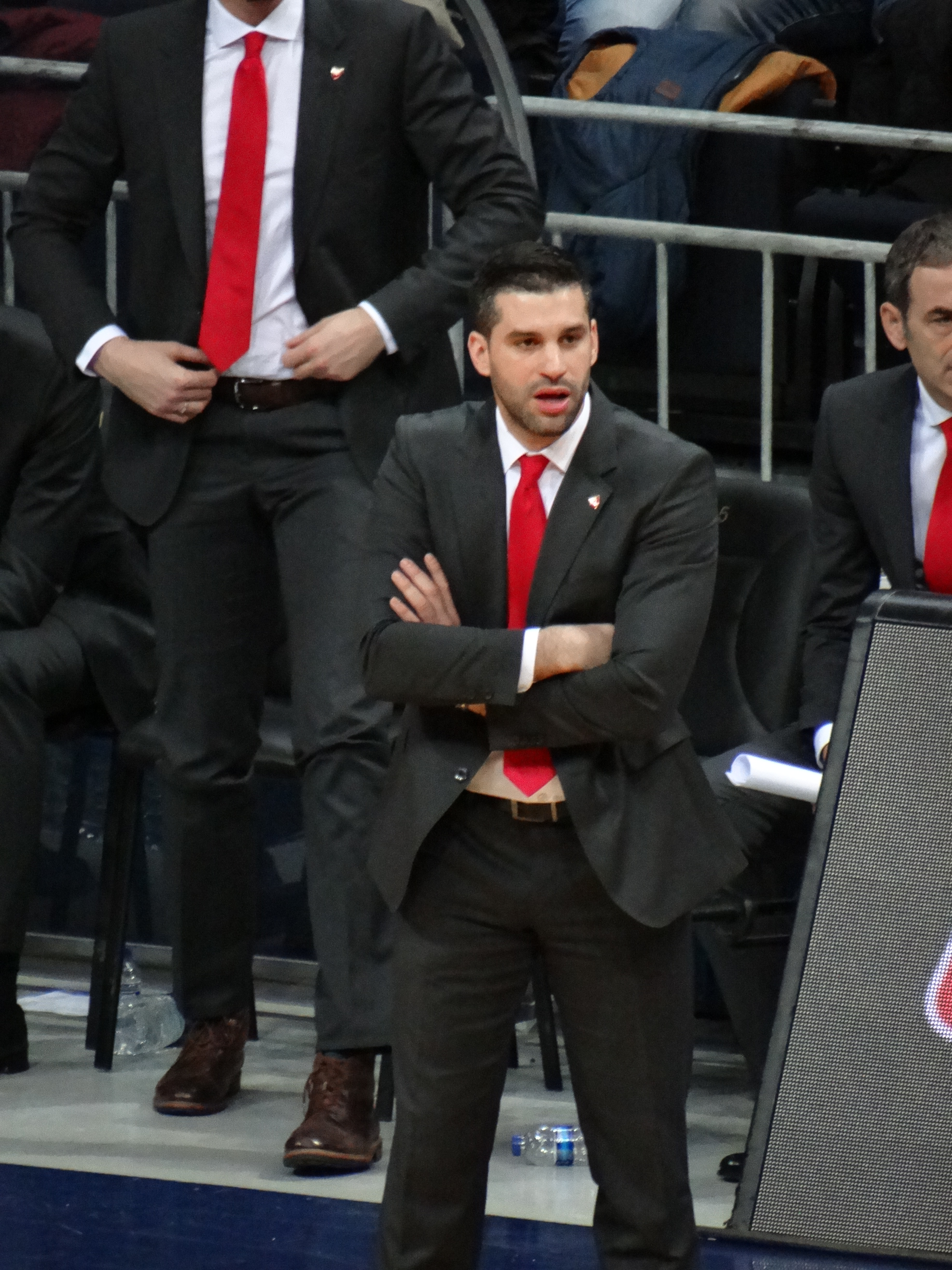
Alimpijević coaching Crvena zvezda in 2017.

Dušan Alimpijević (Serbian Cyrillic: Душан Алимпијевић; born 9 March 1986) is a Serbian basketball coach who serves as head coach of Beşiktaş of the Turkish Basketbol Süper Ligi (BSL) and the EuroLeague, and the Serbian national team.

== Coaching career ==
=== Early years ===
Alimpijević coached Vojvodina Srbijagas from Novi Sad and Spartak from Subotica of the Basketball League of Serbia. In 2017, he coached FMP for the 2016–17 Serbia Super League and finished on the second place.

=== Crvena zvezda ===
On 21 July 2017, Alimpijević was named a head coach of the Belgrade team Crvena zvezda. He made his Adriatic League debut as head coach on 1 October in an 88–77 home victory against Mornar Bar. On 13 October, Alimpijević made his EuroLeague debut in a 76–78 road loss against Žalgiris Kaunas. In the EuroLeague Round 2 on 20 October 2017, he made his first EuroLeague win in a home game against FC Barcelona Lassa. Crvena zvezda was eliminated in the regular season of 2017–18 EuroLeague with 11–19 record. In April 2018, Crvena zvezda – as the defending champions of the ABA League – lost the title to Budućnost Podgorica with 3–1 record in the finals series, thus way failing to secure a spot in 2018–19 EuroLeague. In May 2018, he was sacked by the club after a series of bad results.

Alimpijević got his first taste of the NBA through Summer League coaching stint in 2018 season with Dallas Mavericks.

On 19 November 2018, Alimpijević was named a head coach of the Russian team Avtodor Saratov. Avtodor Saratov parted ways with him on 30 January 2019.

=== Turkey and the United States ===
On 24 November 2020, Alimpijević was named the head coach of Frutti Extra Bursaspor of the Turkish Super League (BSL). In April 2021, he signed a three-year extension contract. In May 2022, Alimpijević won the EuroCup Basketball Coach of the Year award for the 2021–22 season.

In July 2022, Alimpijević joined the San Antonio Spurs coaching staff for the 2022 NBA Summer League. On 29 June 2023, he signed with Beşiktaş Emlakjet. Alimpijević finished the 2023-24 Turkish Super League regular season 3rd place.

== Serbia men's basketball team ==
On 30 September 2025, Alimpijević signed a three-year contract as head coach of Serbia men's national basketball team, replacing Svetislav Pešić.

== Coaching record ==
Legend
G	Games coached	W	Games won	L	Games lost	W–L %	Win-loss %

Note: The EuroLeague is not the only competition in which the team played during the season. He also coached in domestic competition, and regional competition if applicable.

=== EuroLeague ===
Team	Year	G	W	L	W–L%	Result
Crvena zvezda	2017–18	30	11	19	.367	Eliminated in regular season
Career		30	11	19	.367	

=== EuroCup ===
Team	Year	G	W	L	W–L%	Result
Bursaspor	2020–21	10	3	7	.300	Eliminated in regular season
Bursaspor	2021–22	22	11	11	.500	Lost Finals
Bursaspor	2022–23	19	8	11	.421	Lost Eighthfinals
Beşiktaş	2023–24	23	12	11	.522	Lost Semifinals
Beşiktaş	2024–25	19	10	9	.526	Lost Eighthfinals
Beşiktaş	2025–26	23	16	7	.696	Lost Finals
Career		116	60	56	.517	

=== Domestic Leagues ===
Team	Year	G	W	L	W–L%	Result
Crvena zvezda	2017–18	30	23	7	.767	Lost Finals series
Crvena zvezda	2017–18	7	5	2	.714	Fired
Avtodor Saratov	2018–19	26	9	17	.346	Eliminated in regular season
Bursaspor	2020–21	22	10	12	.455	Eliminated in regular season
Bursaspor	2021–22	33	19	14	.576	Lost Quarterfinals series
Bursaspor	2022–23	32	17	15	.531	Lost Quarterfinals series
Beşiktaş J.K.	2023–24	35	23	12	.657	Lost Semifinals series
Beşiktaş J.K.	2024–25	41	29	12	.707	Lost Finals series
Beşiktaş J.K.	2025–26	42	31	11	.738	Lost Finals series
Career		268	166	102	.619	

== See also ==
- List of KK Crvena zvezda head coaches
