= 2018–19 KK Partizan season =

Partizan NIS Belgrade
2018–19 season
- President: (Serbia) Ostoja Mijailović
- Head coach: (Serbia) Nenad Čanak (until 27 October 2018) (Serbia) Aleksandar Matović (27 October – 1 November 2018) (Italy) Andrea Trinchieri
- Arena: Aleksandar Nikolić Hall
- Serbian League: Runner-up
- ABA League: Semi-finals
- EuroCup: Top 16
- Radivoj Korać Cup: Winner
- ABA Supercup: Semi-finals
- Highest home attendance: 7,920 vs Zadar (27 October 2018)
- Lowest home attendance: 400 vs Sloboda Užice (30 May 2019)
- Average home attendance: 4,693
- Biggest win: 96-58 vs Dynamic (5 May 2019); 97-59 vs FMP (7 June 2019)
- Biggest defeat: 97-74 vs Alba Berlin (5 February 2019)
Home	Away
- All statistics correct as of June 17, 2019.

In the 2018–19 season, Partizan NIS Belgrade will compete in the Serbian League, Radivoj Korać Cup, Adriatic League and EuroCup.

== Players ==
=== Current roster ===
Note: Flags indicate national team eligibility at FIBA-sanctioned events. Players may hold other non-FIBA nationalities not displayed.

Partizan NIS Belgrade roster
Players
Coaches

Pos.	No.	Nat.	Name	Ht.		Age
F/C	1	(Serbia)	Janković, Nikola	2.06 m (6 ft 9 in)	108 kg (238 lb)	32 – 13 February 1994
CG	2	(United States)	Paige, Marcus	1.83 m (6 ft 0 in)	74 kg (163 lb)	33 – 11 September 1993
SG	3	(Serbia)	Trifunović, Uroš (TW)	1.99 m (6 ft 6 in)	88 kg (194 lb)	25 – 5 December 2000
CG	4	(Serbia)	Pušica, Vasilije	1.96 m (6 ft 5 in)	95 kg (209 lb)	31 – 5 September 1995
F	5	(France)	Sy, Bandja (injured)	2.04 m (6 ft 8 in)	97 kg (214 lb)	36 – 30 July 1990
SG	7	(Serbia)	Aranitović, Aleksandar	1.95 m (6 ft 5 in)	91 kg (201 lb)	28 – 24 January 1998
SG	9	(Serbia)	Marinković, Vanja	1.98 m (6 ft 6 in)	86 kg (190 lb)	29 – 9 January 1997
CG	10	(Serbia)	Jaramaz, Ognjen (L)	1.93 m (6 ft 4 in)	88 kg (194 lb)	31 – 1 September 1995
CG	11	(Bosnia and Herzegovina)	Gegić, Amar	2.00 m (6 ft 7 in)	89 kg (196 lb)	28 – 14 February 1998
PF	12	(Serbia)	Veličković, Novica (C)	2.05 m (6 ft 9 in)	109 kg (240 lb)	39 – 5 October 1986
F/C	15	(Serbia)	Pecarski, Marko	2.08 m (6 ft 10 in)	98 kg (216 lb)	26 – 12 February 2000
C	20	(Serbia)	Tanasković, Dušan (TW)	2.08 m (6 ft 10 in)	103 kg (227 lb)	25 – 23 February 2001
SF	25	(Serbia)	Zagorac, Rade	2.06 m (6 ft 9 in)	92 kg (203 lb)	31 – 12 August 1995
CG	32	(Bosnia and Herzegovina)	Renfroe, Alex	1.91 m (6 ft 3 in)	80 kg (176 lb)	40 – 23 May 1986
F/C	33	(Serbia)	Janković, Stefan	2.11 m (6 ft 11 in)	105 kg (231 lb)	33 – 4 August 1993
C	34	(Australia)	Landale, Jock	2.11 m (6 ft 11 in)	116 kg (256 lb)	30 – 25 October 1995
C	41	(Serbia)	Gagić, Đorđe	2.10 m (6 ft 11 in)	114 kg (251 lb)	35 – 28 December 1990
PG	77	(Slovenia)	Nikolić, Aleksej	1.91 m (6 ft 3 in)	92 kg (203 lb)	31 – 21 February 1995

Head coach

- (Italy) Andrea Trinchieri

Assistant coach(es)

- (Serbia) Aleksandar Matović
- (Montenegro) Vlado Šćepanović

Strength & conditioning coach(es)

- (Serbia) Sead Krdžalić

Team manager

- (Serbia) Dušan Kecman

Legend

- (C) Team captain
- (L) Loan
- (TW) Two-way affiliate player
- Injured

- Roster
Updated: May 20, 2019

=== Depth chart ===
Pos.	Starting 5	Bench 1	Bench 2
C	Jock Landale	Đorđe Gagić	Nikola Janković
PF	Novica Veličković	Stefan Janković	Marko Pecarski
SF	Rade Zagorac	Bandja Sy	Aleksandar Aranitović
SG	Marcus Paige	Vanja Marinković	Ognjen Jaramaz
PG	Alex Renfroe	Aleksej Nikolić	Amar Gegić

=== Players with multiple nationalities ===
- (Bosnia and Herzegovina) (Germany) Amar Gegić
- (Serbia) (Canada) Stefan Janković
- (United States) (Serbia) Marcus Paige
- (Bosnia and Herzegovina) (United States) Alex Renfroe
- (France) (Mali) Bandja Sy

=== On loan ===
Partizan NIS players out on loan
Nat.	Player	Position	Team	On loan since
(Serbia)	Bogdan Rutešić	SF	(Serbia) Mladost Zemun	September 2018
(Serbia)	Aleksandar Davitkov	PG	(Serbia) Mladost Zemun	September 2018
(Serbia)	Bogdan Trifunović	SF/SG	(Serbia) Mladost Zemun	September 2018
(Serbia)	Marko Vukojčić	SG	(Serbia) Mladost Zemun	September 2018
(Serbia)	Uroš Trifunović	SG	(Serbia) Mladost Zemun (Two-way affiliate)	October 2018
(Serbia)	Dušan Tanasković	C	(Serbia) Mladost Zemun (Two-way affiliate)	October 2018
(Serbia)	Dušan Miletić	C	(Serbia) Borac Čačak	March 2019
(Serbia)	Nikola Tanasković	SF	(Serbia) OKK Beograd	April 2019
(Serbia)	Tadija Tadić	PG	(Serbia) Sloboda Užice	April 2019
(Serbia)	Dimitrije Nikolić	C	(Serbia) Sloboda Užice	April 2019

=== Roster changes ===
==== In ====
No.	Pos.	Nat.	Name	Moving from	Ref.
8	SF	(Serbia)	Đorđe Pažin	(Serbia) Mladost Zemun (loan return)	
25	SF	(Serbia)	Rade Zagorac	(Spain) Real Betis Energía Plus	
77	PG	(Slovenia)	Aleksej Nikolić	(Germany) Brose Bamberg	
2	PG	(United States)	Marcus Paige	(United States) Charlotte Hornets	
34	C	(Australia)	Jock Landale	(United States) Saint Mary's	
11	PG	(Bosnia and Herzegovina)	Amar Gegić	(Germany) Bayern Munich	
3	SG	(Serbia)	Uroš Trifunović	(Turkey) Pınar Karşıyaka U18	
33	C/PF	(Serbia)	Stefan Janković	(Serbia) Crvena zvezda	
21	SF/SG	(United States)	Anthony Brown	(United States) Minnesota Timberwolves	
32	PG/SG	(Bosnia and Herzegovina)	Alex Renfroe	(Spain) Manresa	
1	PF/C	(Serbia)	Nikola Janković	(Spain) Estudiantes	
10	PG	(Serbia)	Ognjen Jaramaz	(Spain) San Pablo Burgos (loan)	
	C	(Serbia)	Dušan Miletić	(Serbia) Sloga	
4	SG/PG	(Serbia)	Vasilije Pušica	(United States) Northeastern Huskies	

==== Out ====
No.	Pos.	Nat.	Name	Moving to	Ref.
4	SF	(United States)	Kwame Vaughn	(Croatia) Zadar	
37	C	(Ghana)	Amida Brimah	(United States) Austin Spurs	
24	SF	(Serbia)	Marko Čakarević	(Serbia) Dynamic	
21	SF	(Serbia)	Mihajlo Andrić	(Germany) Göttingen	
14	C	(Bosnia and Herzegovina)	Obrad Tomić	(Slovenia) Rogaška	
95	C	(Serbia)	Đoko Šalić	(Slovenia) Helios Suns	
3	PG	(United States)	Nigel Williams-Goss	(Greece) Olympiacos	
8	SG	(Serbia)	Slobodan Jovanović	(Bosnia and Herzegovina) Spars Sarajevo	
21	SF/SG	(United States)	Anthony Brown	(United States) Lakeland Magic	
17	PF	(Serbia)	Strahinja Gavrilović	(Serbia) Borac Čačak	

== Pre-season and friendlies ==
Win Loss

29 August 2018	Partizan (Serbia)	93–95(OT)	(Germany) Oldenburg	Belgrade
18:00	Scoring by quarter: 25–12, 20–30, 14–23, 23–17, Overtime: 11–13
	Pts: Paige, Landale 25; Rebs: not available Asts: not available	Report; Report	Pts: Cummings 20; Rebs: not available Asts: not available

1 September 2018	Partizan (Serbia)	68–75	(Romania) U-BT Cluj-Napoca	Belgrade
18:30	Scoring by quarter: 19–17, 23–24, 14–20, 12–14
	Pts: Gagić, Landale 15; Rebs: not available Asts: not available	Report	Pts: Dykes 25; Rebs: not available Asts: not available

5 September 2018	Baskonia (Spain)	91–54	(Serbia) Partizan	Monzón
20:15	Scoring by quarter: 25–10, 18–14, 23–16, 25–14
	Pts: Shengelia 23; Rebs: Shengelia 9 Asts: Huertas 8	Report; Report	Pts: Landale 10; Rebs: Pecarski 7 Asts: Paige, Nikolić 3	Referees: Roberto Lucas, Fernando Martinez, Daniel Checa

8 September 2018	Zaragoza (Spain)	87–81	(Serbia) Partizan	Tarragona
18:00	Scoring by quarter: 27–32, 25–16, 15–19, 20–14
Arena Sport	Pts: Seibutis 17; Rebs: Vázquez 7 Asts: Alocén 7	Report; Report	Pts: Paige 25; Rebs: five players 6 Asts: Paige 6	Arena: Palau d'Esports de Catalunya; Referees: Emilio Pérez Pizarro, Eva Areste, Roberto Lucas

9 September 2018	Iberostar Tenerife (Spain)	103–65	(Serbia) Partizan	Tarragona
19:15	Scoring by quarter: 25–23, 30–9, 17–13, 31–20
Arena Sport	Pts: Abromaitis 22; Rebs: Saiz 9 Asts: Bassas 6	Report; Report	Pts: Gagić 14; Rebs: Paige, Landale 5 Asts: Nikolić 6	Arena: Palau d'Esports de Catalunya; Referees: Emilio Pérez Pizarro, Eva Areste, Alberto Baena

11 September 2018	Partizan (Serbia)	90–75	Angola	Lleida
	Scoring by quarter: 30–12, 21–20, 21–20, 17–23
	Pts: Pecarski 14; Rebs: not available Asts: not available	Report	Pts: not available Rebs: not available Asts: not available

12 September 2018	Barcelona Lassa (Spain)	101–64	(Serbia) Partizan	Lleida
20:45	Scoring by quarter: 23–16, 24–10, 25–16, 29–22
	Pts: Singleton 18; Rebs: Blažič 6 Asts: Heurtel 9	Report; Report	Pts: Zagorac 13; Rebs: Pecarski 5 Asts: Zagorac 3

1 December 2018	Mega Bemax (Serbia)	82–93	(Serbia) Partizan	Belgrade
	Scoring by quarter: 25–23, 25–30, 14–21, 18–19
	Pts: Fundić 17; Rebs: Stanić 10; Asts: Ašćerić 6	Report; Report	Pts: Landale 22; Rebs: Zagorac 7 Asts: Paige 8	Arena: Mega Factory

== Competitions ==
	Competition	Position	Record
(Serbia)	Basketball League of Serbia	Runners-up	13–4
(Serbia)	Radivoj Korać Cup	Winners	3–0
(European Union)	Adriatic League	Semifinals	15–10
(European Union)	ABA Supercup	Semifinals	1–1
(European Union)	EuroCup	TOP 16	6–10

== Adriatic League ==
=== Regular season ===
Pos	Team	Pld	W	L	PF	PA	PD	Pts	Qualification or relegation
2	(Croatia) Cedevita	22	16	6	1924	1769	+155	38 (Note: Cedevita 1–1, 1.02; Budućnost VOLI 1–1, 0.98)	Advance to the playoffs
3	(Montenegro) Budućnost VOLI	22	16	6	1783	1636	+147	38	Advance to the playoffs
4	(Serbia) Partizan NIS	22	14	8	1779	1663	+116	36	Advance to the playoffs
5	(Serbia) Mega Bemax	22	10	12	1802	1880	−78	32 (Note: Mega Bemax 1–1, 1.06; FMP 1–1, 0.94)	
6	(Serbia) FMP	22	10	12	1736	1786	−50	32	

Source: ABA League

=== Matches ===
Win Loss

29 September 2018 1	Cedevita (Croatia)	84–87	(Serbia) Partizan	Zagreb
20:00	Scoring by quarter: 17–28, 15–25, 26–18, 26–16
Arena Sport	Pts: Cobbs, Bell 19; Rebs: Benite, Lima, Cook 6 Asts: Cobbs 5 PIR: Bell 16	Boxscore	Pts: Marinković 25; Rebs: Gagić 8 Asts: Paige 6 PIR: Marinković 28	Arena: Dom Sportova; Attendance: 2,500; Referees: Saša Pukl, Matej Boltauzer, Sašo Petek

6 October 2018 2	Partizan (Serbia)	82–79	(Slovenia) Olimpija	Belgrade
21:00	Scoring by quarter: 18–16, 16–19, 22–21, 26–23
Arena Sport	Pts: Zagorac 26; Rebs: Landale 11; Asts: Paige, Landale 4 PIR: Zagorac 25	Boxscore	Pts: Špan 24; Rebs: Lazić 11; Asts: Lazić 5 PIR: Špan 27	Arena: Hall Aleksandar Nikolić; Attendance: 7,000; Referees: Miloš Koljenšić, Igor Dragojević, Ivan Stefanović

14 October 2018 3	Mornar (Montenegro)	97–94	(Serbia) Partizan	Bar
17:00	Scoring by quarter: 25–14, 25–22, 22–23, 25–35
Arena Sport	Pts: Vranješ 26; Rebs: Luković 7 Asts: Koenig 5 PIR: Vranješ 33	Boxscore	Pts: Gagić 23; Rebs: Zagorac 6 Asts: Paige 6 PIR: Paige 21	Arena: Topolica Sport Hall; Attendance: 2,750; Referees: Sreten Radović, Mario Majkić, Milija Vojinović

20 October 2018 4	Krka (Slovenia)	80–76	(Serbia) Partizan	Novo Mesto
17:00	Scoring by quarter: 18–18, 22–16, 10–17, 30–25
Arena Sport	Pts: Lapornik 19; Rebs: Lapornik 8 Asts: Marinelli 9 PIR: Lapornik 27	Boxscore	Pts: Marinković 22; Rebs: Gagić, Veličković 4 Asts: Marinković, Paige 5 PIR: Marinković 21	Arena: Leon Štukelj Hall; Attendance: 1,550; Referees: Damir Javor, Branislav Mrdak, Gordan Terlević

27 October 2018 5	Partizan (Serbia)	85–95	(Croatia) Zadar	Belgrade
21:00	Scoring by quarter: 23–23, 17–25, 17–25, 28–22
Arena Sport	Pts: Janković 19; Rebs: Janković, Landale 4 Asts: Paige 6 PIR: Janković 24	Boxscore	Pts: Božić 27; Rebs: Božić 9 Asts: Grant 8 PIR: Božić 36	Arena: Štark Arena; Attendance: 7,920; Referees: Marko Juras, Matej Špendl, Denis Hadžić

3 November 2018 6	Mega Bemax (Serbia)	74–81	(Serbia) Partizan	Sremska Mitrovica
17:00	Scoring by quarter: 15–24, 20–22, 20–23, 19–12
Arena Sport	Pts: Bitadze 28; Rebs: Bitadze 11; Asts: Mokoka, Marjanović 4 PIR: Bitadze 43	Boxscore	Pts: Marinković, Zagorac 17; Rebs: Landale 9 Asts: Paige 6 PIR: Landale 22	Arena: Pinki Sports Hall; Attendance: 2,500; Referees: Uroš Obrknežević, Sašo Petek, Igor Dragojević

10 November 2018 7	Partizan (Serbia)	86–67	(Croatia) Cibona	Belgrade
19:00	Scoring by quarter: 23–23, 22–17, 24–16, 17–11
Arena Sport	Pts: Landale 19; Rebs: Landale 7 Asts: Paige 5 PIR: Zagorac 25	Boxscore	Pts: Bundović 14; Rebs: Jefferson 4 Asts: Bilinovac, Marić, Rozić 2 PIR: Bundović 12	Arena: Hall Aleksandar Nikolić; Attendance: 6,500; Referees: Saša Pukl, Milan Nedović, Uroš Nikolić

18 November 2018 8	Budućnost (Montenegro)	75–71	(Serbia) Partizan	Podgorica
19:00	Scoring by quarter: 26–16, 14–14, 14–22, 21–19
Arena Sport	Pts: Clark 20; Rebs: Clark, Šehović 6 Asts: Gordić 6 PIR: Clark 26	Boxscore	Pts: Janković 15; Rebs: Sy 8 Asts: Paige, Zagorac 5 PIR: Janković 22	Arena: Morača Sports Center; Attendance: 5,389; Referees: Tomislav Hordov, Branislav Mrdak, Dragan Kralj

24 November 2018 9	Partizan (Serbia)	71–77	(Serbia) Crvena zvezda	Belgrade
17:00	Scoring by quarter: 22–15, 19–23, 10–20, 20–19
Arena Sport	Pts: Landale 18; Rebs: Landale, Janković 5 Asts: Nikolić 4 PIR: Landale 18	Boxscore	Pts: Perperoglou 25; Rebs: Zirbes 8 Asts: Ragland 6 PIR: Perperoglou 30	Arena: Hall Aleksandar Nikolić; Attendance: 6,500; Referees: Ilija Belošević, Milija Vojinović, Dragan Porobić

8 December 2018 10	Igokea (Bosnia and Herzegovina)	84–97	(Serbia) Partizan	Laktaši
17:00	Scoring by quarter: 24–30, 20–17, 21–28, 19–22
Arena Sport	Pts: Adamović 19; Rebs: Lešić 8 Asts: Adamović 10; PIR: Adamović, Williams 22	Boxscore	Pts: Marinković 28; Rebs: Janković 12; Asts: Paige 7 PIR: Marinković 32	Arena: Laktaši Sports Hall; Attendance: 3,500; Referees: Miloš Koljenšić, Mario Majkić, Saša Babić

15 December 2018 11	Partizan (Serbia)	83–77	(Serbia) FMP	Belgrade
21:00	Scoring by quarter: 17–22, 26–20, 25–20, 15–15
Arena Sport	Pts: Landale, Gagić 16; Rebs: Landale 10; Asts: Paige 6 PIR: Landale 29	Boxscore	Pts: Rebec 17; Rebs: Reath 5 Asts: Pot 6 PIR: Jeremić 12	Arena: Hall Aleksandar Nikolić; Attendance: 3,300; Referees: Damir Javor, Josip Radojković, Radoš Arsenijević

22 December 2018 12	Partizan (Serbia)	71–76	(Croatia) Cedevita	Belgrade
19:00	Scoring by quarter: 18–17, 12–25, 24–18, 17–16
Arena Sport	Pts: Paige 14; Rebs: Landale 10; Asts: Paige 5 PIR: Landale 23	Boxscore	Pts: Pullen 19; Rebs: Stipanović 11; Asts: Cobbs 4 PIR: Pullen 23	Arena: Hall Aleksandar Nikolić; Attendance: 6,500; Referees: Saša Pukl, Sašo Petek, Milan Nedović

29 December 2018 13	Olimpija (Slovenia)	66–72	(Serbia) Partizan	Ljubljana
17:00	Scoring by quarter: 15–15, 17–18, 19–20, 15–19
Arena Sport	Pts: Špan 19; Rebs: Špan 6 Asts: Badžim 3 PIR: Špan 17	Boxscore	Pts: Paige 15; Rebs: Landale 9 Asts: Renfroe 4 PIR: Marinković 17	Arena: Arena Stožice; Attendance: 3,000; Referees: Igor Dragojević, Matej Špendl, Uroš Nikolić

5 January 2019 14	Partizan (Serbia)	75–73	(Montenegro) Mornar	Belgrade
19:00	Scoring by quarter: 18–14, 20–15, 17–24, 20–20
Arena Sport	Pts: Renfroe 18; Rebs: Renfroe 7 Asts: Renfroe 5 PIR: Renfroe 23	Boxscore	Pts: Waller 24; Rebs: Waller, Sané, Luković 6 Asts: Mićović, Rebić 3 PIR: Waller 19	Arena: Hall Aleksandar Nikolić; Attendance: 1,200; Referees: Ilija Belošević, Marko Juras, Radoš Arsenijević

12 January 2019 15	Partizan (Serbia)	87–55	(Slovenia) Krka	Belgrade
19:00	Scoring by quarter: 20–11, 19–19, 22–11, 26–14
Arena Sport	Pts: Paige 17; Rebs: Sy 6 Asts: Zagorac 6 PIR: Paige 24	Boxscore	Pts: Lapornik 13; Rebs: Bratož, Lalić 6 Asts: Škedelj 3 PIR: Jošilo 12	Arena: Hall Aleksandar Nikolić; Attendance: 6,000; Referees: Tomislav Hordov, Milivoje Jovčić, Gordan Terlević

19 January 2019 16	Zadar (Croatia)	92–97(OT)	(Serbia) Partizan	Zadar
17:00	Scoring by quarter: 23–20, 23–30, 19–19, 17–13, Overtime: 10–15
Arena Sport	Pts: Little 20; Rebs: Dašić 7 Asts: Bašić 6 PIR: Dašić, Božić 21	Boxscore	Pts: Paige 28; Rebs: N. Janković 7 Asts: Renfroe 10; PIR: Paige 29	Arena: Krešimir Ćosić Hall; Attendance: 8,000; Referees: Damir Javor, Josip Radojković, Milan Nedović

26 January 2019 17	Partizan (Serbia)	98–86	(Serbia) Mega Bemax	Belgrade
19:00	Scoring by quarter: 19–18, 31–22, 21–27, 27–19
Arena Sport	Pts: Nikolić 20; Rebs: Landale 6 Asts: Renfroe 7 PIR: Nikolić 26	Boxscore	Pts: Mišković 30; Rebs: Fundić 9 Asts: Ratkovica 6 PIR: Mišković 32	Arena: Hall Aleksandar Nikolić; Attendance: 5,000; Referees: Miloš Koljenšić, Uroš Nikolić, Branislav Mrdak

2 February 2019 18	Cibona (Croatia)	59–83	(Serbia) Partizan	Zagreb
17:00	Scoring by quarter: 16–20, 16–21, 14–22, 13–20
Arena Sport	Pts: M.Ljubičić 18; Rebs: Bundović 7 Asts: Bilinovac, Rogić, K.Ljubičić 2 PIR: M.Ljubičić 15	Boxscore	Pts: Gagić 16; Rebs: N.Janković 6 Asts: Renfroe 6 PIR: Gagić 20	Arena: Dražen Petrović Basketball Hall; Attendance: 1,700; Referees: Matej Boltauzer, Milija Vojinović, Vladan Šundić

10 February 2019 19	Partizan (Serbia)	76–67	(Montenegro) Budućnost	Belgrade
19:00	Scoring by quarter: 17–12, 15–19, 23–15, 21–21
Arena Sport	Pts: Landale 23; Rebs: Renfroe 6 Asts: Renfroe 11; PIR: Landale 25	Boxscore	Pts: Jackson 19; Rebs: Clark 8 Asts: Cole 4 PIR: Jackson, Clark 15	Arena: Hall Aleksandar Nikolić; Attendance: 6,000; Referees: Damir Javor, Sašo Petek, Mario Majkić

3 March 2019 20	Crvena zvezda (Serbia)	70–68	(Serbia) Partizan	Belgrade
18:00	Scoring by quarter: 16–16, 16–18, 20–14, 18–20
Arena Sport	Pts: Ragland 18; Rebs: Ojo 9 Asts: Ragland 5 PIR: Ojo 23	Boxscore	Pts: Landale, Marinković 13; Rebs: Landale, N.Janković 6 Asts: Paige 4 PIR: Jaramaz 16	Arena: Hall Aleksandar Nikolić; Attendance: 5,435; Referees: Miloš Koljenšić, Marko Juras, Uroš Nikolić

9 March 2019 21	Partizan (Serbia)	67–57	(Bosnia and Herzegovina) Igokea	Belgrade
19:00	Scoring by quarter: 14–13, 17–10, 16–16, 20–18
Arena Sport	Pts: Landale 17; Rebs: Landale 11; Asts: Paige, Sy 4 PIR: Landale 30	Boxscore	Pts: Lešić 16; Rebs: Williams, Luković 6 Asts: Radivojević 6 PIR: Lešić 20	Arena: Hall Aleksandar Nikolić; Attendance: 4,000; Referees: Igor Dragojević, Ivan Stefanović, Dragan Porobić

16 March 2019 22	FMP (Serbia)	73–72	(Serbia) Partizan	Belgrade
17:00	Scoring by quarter: 18–17, 27–22, 16–17, 12–16
Arena Sport	Pts: Reath 16; Rebs: Radovanović 6 Asts: Uskoković 9 PIR: Bursać 16	Boxscore	Pts: Landale 14; Rebs: Zagorac 8 Asts: Paige 4 PIR: Paige, Landale 15	Arena: Železnik Hall; Attendance: 500; Referees: Tomislav Hordov, Uroš Obrknežević, Vladan Šundić

=== Playoffs ===
Semifinals

23 March 2019 SF 1	Crvena zvezda (Serbia)	106–101(OT) (Series: 1–0)	(Serbia) Partizan	Belgrade
19:00	Scoring by quarter: 21–11, 15–24, 24–28, 25–22, Overtime: 21–16
Arena Sport, TV O2	Pts: Baron 23; Rebs: Davidovac 6 Asts: Čović 9 PIR: Davidovac 26	Report	Pts: Marinković 20; Rebs: Sy 6 Asts: Renfroe 8 PIR: Marinković 21	Arena: Aleksandar Nikolić Hall; Attendance: 5,989; Referees: Ilija Belošević, Damir Javor, Tomislav Hordov

30 March 2019 SF 2	Partizan (Serbia)	70–67 (Series: 1–1)	(Serbia) Crvena zvezda	Belgrade
19:00	Scoring by quarter: 13–9, 21–18, 14–22, 22–18
Arena Sport, TV O2	Pts: Marinković 18; Rebs: Landale 8 Asts: Marinković, Renfroe, Paige, Nikolić 3 PIR: Marinković 22	Report	Pts: Perperoglou 16; Rebs: Ojo 6 Asts: Čović 7 PIR: Perperoglou 12	Arena: Aleksandar Nikolić Hall; Attendance: 6,500; Referees: Matej Boltauzer, Saša Pukl, Miloš Koljenšić

6 April 2019 SF 3	Crvena zvezda (Serbia)	84–63 (Series: 2–1)	(Serbia) Partizan	Belgrade
18:00	Scoring by quarter: 21–13, 23–15, 20–13, 20–22
Arena Sport, TV O2	Pts: Perperoglou 18; Rebs: Ojo 8 Asts: Čović 6 PIR: Čović, Dobrić 13	Report	Pts: Marinković 12; Rebs: Paige, Veličković 6 Asts: Renfroe 8 PIR: Janković 15	Arena: Aleksandar Nikolić Hall; Attendance: 6,858; Referees: Sreten Radović, Sašo Petek, Mario Majkić

== Basketball League of Serbia ==
The 2018–19 Basketball League of Serbia is the 13th season of the Serbian highest professional basketball league and the Super League, as the second part of the season, will be held within April to May 2019.

=== Regular season ===
Pos	Team	Pld	W	L	PF	PA	PD	Pts	Qualification
1	Partizan NIS	10	10	0	894	656	+238	20	Qualification to the Playoffs
2	Mega Bemax	10	7	3	969	837	+132	17	Qualification to the Playoffs
3	Dynamic VIP PAY	10	5	5	807	908	−101	15	
4	Novi Pazar	10	4	6	864	867	−3	14	
5	Tamiš	10	2	8	745	880	−135	12	
6	Sloboda	10	2	8	753	884	−131	12	

Source: Basketball League of Serbia

=== Matches ===
Win Loss

26 April 2019 1	Partizan	102–69	Mega Bemax	Belgrade
20:00	Scoring by quarter: 22–8, 23–21, 20–14, 37–26
Arena Sport	Pts: Pušica 22; Rebs: Zagorac 9 Asts: Zagorac 6 PIR: Pušica 30	Boxscore	Pts: Koprivica 16; Rebs: Atić 6 Asts: Atić 6 PIR: Atić 15	Arena: Hall Aleksandar Nikolić; Attendance: 3,000; Referees: Milivoje Jovčić, Marko Juras, Nemanja Ninković

2 May 2019 2	Partizan	84–80	Tamiš	Belgrade
19:00	Scoring by quarter: 16–21, 29–25, 17–8, 22–26
	Pts: Pecarski 16; Rebs: N. Janković, Zagorac 5 Asts: Paige 7 PIR: N. Janković 21	Boxscore	Pts: Mitrović 20; Rebs: Ilkić, Smiljanić, Jeković 4 Asts: Ilkić 6 PIR: Ilkić, Smiljanić 17	Arena: Hall Aleksandar Nikolić; Attendance: 1,700; Referees: Milija Vojinović, Ivan Stefanović, Vladimir Vesković

5 May 2019 3	Partizan	96–58	Dynamic	Belgrade
20:30	Scoring by quarter: 28–16, 22–13, 20–12, 26–17
Arena Sport	Pts: N. Janković 16; Rebs: N. Janković, Pecarski 7 Asts: Renfroe, Jaramaz 6 PIR: N. Janković 23	Boxscore	Pts: Beslać, Šalić 10; Rebs: Šalić 8 Asts: Ostojić 4 PIR: Glišić 11	Arena: Hall Aleksandar Nikolić; Attendance: 1,200; Referees: Ilija Belošević, Radoš Arsenijević, Duško Sedlar

10 May 2019 4	Novi Pazar	66–81	Partizan	Novi Pazar
17:00	Scoring by quarter: 23–22, 13–22, 13–16, 15–21
Arena Sport	Pts: Hadžifejzović 18; Rebs: Hadžifejzović, Krstić 6 Asts: Radonjić 5 PIR: Hadžifejzović 19	Boxscore	Pts: Veličković 16; Rebs: Zagorac 8 Asts: Renfroe 4 PIR: Veličković 24	Arena: Pendik Sports Hall; Attendance: 1,700; Referees: Marko Juras, Uroš Nikolić, Branislav Mrdak

12 May 2019 5	Sloboda Užice	62–84	Partizan	Užice
19:00	Scoring by quarter: 15–20, 12–18, 18–16, 17–30
Arena Sport	Pts: Marić 14; Rebs: Simić, Đorđević 6 Asts: Tadić 4 PIR: Simić, Tadić 11	Boxscore	Pts: Nikolić 15; Rebs: N. Janković, Pecarski 7 Asts: Jaramaz, Pušica 3 PIR: Pecarski 20	Arena: Veliki Park Hall; Attendance: 2,500; Referees: Milija Vojinović, Aleksandar Glišić, Aleksandar Milojević

16 May 2019 6	Mega Bemax	81–90	Partizan	Belgrade
17:30	Scoring by quarter: 19–23, 17–25, 20–15, 25–27
Arena Sport	Pts: Bitadze 26; Rebs: Bitadze 15; Asts: Ašćerić, Atić 6 PIR: Bitadze 38	Boxscore	Pts: Marinković 17; Rebs: Veličković 11; Asts: Renfroe 8 PIR: Veličković 20	Arena: Mega Factory Hall; Attendance: 400; Referees: Ilija Belošević, Uroš Obrknežević, Vladimir Jevtović

18 May 2019 7	Tamiš	62–88	Partizan	Pančevo
19:00	Scoring by quarter: 28–28, 15–22, 10–21, 9–17
Arena Sport	Pts: Jeković 18; Rebs: Knežević 8 Asts: Ilkić 4 PIR: Jeković 10	Boxscore	Pts: Marinković 22; Rebs: N. Janković 8 Asts: Nikolić, Paige 4 PIR: Marinković 25	Arena: Strelište Sports Hall; Attendance: 2,000; Referees: Saša Maričić, Radoš Arsenijević, Marko Pecelj

23 May 2019 8	Dynamic	62–91	Partizan	Belgrade
18:00	Scoring by quarter: 17–35, 14–16, 17–25, 14–15
Arena Sport	Pts: Đerić, Kutlešić 12; Rebs: Đerić 6 Asts: Kutlešić 4 PIR: Kutlešić 19	Boxscore	Pts: S.Janković 21; Rebs: Pecarski 8 Asts: Zagorac 4 PIR: S.Janković 20	Arena: Master Sports Center; Attendance: 500; Referees: Marko Juras, Aleksandar Glišić, Aleksandar Milojević

26 May 2019 9	Partizan	93–67	Novi Pazar	Belgrade
20:00	Scoring by quarter: 24–9, 22–23, 19–21, 28–14
Arena Sport	Pts: Marinković, Jaramaz 13; Rebs: N. Janković 8 Asts: Jaramaz 6 PIR: Jaramaz 25	Boxscore	Pts: Radonjić 17; Rebs: Hadžifejzović 7 Asts: Radonjić 6 PIR: Brunčević, Krstić 13	Arena: Hall Aleksandar Nikolić; Attendance: 1,500; Referees: Milivoje Jovčić, Milija Vojinović, Marko Strika

30 May 2019 10	Partizan	85–49	Sloboda Užice	Belgrade
18:00	Scoring by quarter: 26–14, 17–10, 22–16, 20–9
Arena Sport	Pts: Pušica, Gagić 13; Rebs: Tanasković 9 Asts: Zagorac 7 PIR: Zagorac 20	Boxscore	Pts: Nikolić 11; Rebs: Simić 7 Asts: Otašević, Đorđević 3 PIR: Nikolić 10	Arena: Hall Aleksandar Nikolić; Attendance: 400; Referees: Marko Juras, Vladimir Jevtović, Nemanja Vlahović

=== Semifinals ===
3 June 2019 Semifinals 1	Partizan	93–75 (Series: 1–0)	FMP	Belgrade
18:00	Scoring by quarter: 21–16, 27–21, 23–24, 22–14
Arena Sport	Pts: Gagić 18; Rebs: Gagić 10; Asts: Renfroe 7 PIR: Veličković 23	Boxscore	Pts: Đorđević 18; Rebs: Đorđević 7 Asts: Pot, Uskoković 4 PIR: Đorđević 20	Arena: Hall Aleksandar Nikolić; Attendance: 3,700; Referees: Ilija Belošević, Marko Juras, Vladimir Jevtović

5 June 2019 Semifinals 2	FMP	88–85 (Series: 1–1)	Partizan	Belgrade
19:00	Scoring by quarter: 19–22, 18–23, 26–15, 25–15
Arena Sport	Pts: Đorđević, Uskoković 18; Rebs: Đorđević 7 Asts: Pot 8 PIR: Pot 22	Boxscore	Pts: Marinković 19; Rebs: N.Janković, Paige 6 Asts: Paige, Renfroe 5 PIR: N.Janković, Marinković 15	Arena: Železnik Hall; Attendance: 450; Referees: Milivoje Jovčić, Uroš Nikolić, Nemanja Ninković

7 June 2019 Semifinals 3	Partizan	97–59 (Series: 2–1)	FMP	Belgrade
19:00	Scoring by quarter: 21–12, 31–16, 22–17, 23–14
Arena Sport	Pts: S.Janković 21; Rebs: S.Janković 13; Asts: Zagorac 9 PIR: S.Janković 32	Boxscore	Pts: Đorđević 19; Rebs: Momirov 5 Asts: Pot 3 PIR: Đorđević 17	Arena: Hall Aleksandar Nikolić; Attendance: 3,500; Referees: Ilija Belošević, Uroš Obrknežević, Aleksandar Glišić

=== Finals ===
10 June 2019 Finals 1	Crvena zvezda	98–94 (Series: 1–0)	Partizan	Belgrade
18:00	Scoring by quarter: 30–22, 18–18, 25–28, 25–26
Arena Sport	Pts: Davidovac 20; Rebs: Ojo 8 Asts: Čović 5 PIR: Čović 28	Boxscore	Pts: Renfroe 20; Rebs: N.Janković 7 Asts: Renfroe, Jaramaz 4 PIR: Renfroe 24	Arena: Hall Aleksandar Nikolić; Attendance: 5,231; Referees: Milivoje Jovčić, Aleksandar Glišić, Vladimir Jevtović

12 June 2019 Finals 2	Partizan	73–72 (Series: 1–1)	Crvena zvezda	Belgrade
19:00	Scoring by quarter: 17–9, 19–20, 13–24, 24–19
Arena Sport	Pts: Paige 19; Rebs: N.Janković 10; Asts: Renfroe 3 PIR: N.Janković 19	Boxscore	Pts: Faye 14; Rebs: Oyo 7 Asts: Baron 7 PIR: Faye 18	Arena: Hall Aleksandar Nikolić; Attendance: 6,500; Referees: Ilija Belošević, Marko Juras, Uroš Obrknežević

15 June 2019 Finals 3	Crvena zvezda	96–90 (Series: 2–1)	Partizan	Belgrade
19:00	Scoring by quarter: 22–18, 26–27, 20–19, 28–26
Arena Sport, TV O2	Pts: Baron 25; Rebs: Faye 9 Asts: Čović 8 PIR: Baron 28	Boxscore	Pts: Marinković 21; Rebs: Renfroe 6 Asts: Renfroe 8 PIR: Renfroe 35	Arena: Hall Aleksandar Nikolić; Attendance: 5,634; Referees: Milivoje Jovčić, Marko Juras, Uroš Nikolić

17 June 2019 Finals 4	Partizan	75–76 (Series: 1–3)	Crvena zvezda	Belgrade
18:00	Scoring by quarter: 23–16, 18–18, 10–18, 23–24
Arena Sport, TV O2	Pts: Renfroe, Gagić 11; Rebs: Veličković 7 Asts: Renfroe 4 PIR: Jaramaz 13	Boxscore	Pts: Baron 21; Rebs: Oyo 7 Asts: Čović 7 PIR: Baron 19	Arena: Hall Aleksandar Nikolić; Attendance: 6,500; Referees: Ilija Belošević, Uroš Obrknežević, Uroš Nikolić

== EuroCup ==
=== Regular season ===
==== Group C ====
Pos	Team	Pld	W	L	PF	PA	PD	Qualification
1	(Spain) Valencia Basket	10	8	2	846	759	+87	Advance to Top 16
2	(France) LDLC ASVEL	10	7	3	781	732	+49	Advance to Top 16
3	(Serbia) Partizan NIS	10	4	6	756	771	−15	Advance to Top 16
4	(Russia) Zenit Saint Petersburg	10	4	6	840	823	+17	Advance to Top 16
5	(Turkey) Türk Telekom	10	4	6	766	819	−53	
6	(Italy) Dolomiti Energia Trento	10	3	7	745	830	−85	

Source: EuroCup Basketball
Rules for classification: All points scored in extra period(s) were not counted in the standings, nor for any tie-break situation.

==== Matches ====
Win Loss

3 October 2018 1	Dolomiti Energia Trento (Italy)	82–73	(Serbia) Partizan	Trento
20:30	Scoring by quarter: 17–24, 26–19, 19–15, 20–15
Sport Klub	Pts: Radičević 15; Rebs: Forray 8 Asts: Radičević, Flaccadori, Hogue 3 PIR: Forray 19	Report	Pts: Marinković 19; Rebs: Zagorac 9 Asts: Zagorac 4 PIR: Zagorac 20	Arena: BLM Group Arena; Attendance: 1,969; Referees: Seffi Shemmesh, Sergio Silva, Moritz Reiter

9 October 2018 2	Partizan (Serbia)	89–82	(Russia) Zenit Saint Petersburg	Belgrade
20:00	Scoring by quarter: 21–22, 18–24, 26–19, 24–17
Sport Klub	Pts: Zagorac, Landale 16; Rebs: Landale 6 Asts: Zagorac, Paige 6 PIR: Zagorac, Landale 22	Report	Pts: Uthoff 25; Rebs: Uthoff 10; Asts: Mekel 10; PIR: Uthoff 34	Arena: Hall Aleksandar Nikolić; Attendance: 6,200; Referees: Miguel Perez Perez, Olegs Latisevs, Renaud Geller

17 October 2018 3	Valencia Basket (Spain)	79–71	(Serbia) Partizan	Valencia
20:45	Scoring by quarter: 20–21, 23–19, 21–14, 15–17
Sport Klub	Pts: Thomas 17; Rebs: Tobey, Dubljević 5 Asts: Van Rossom 5 PIR: Tobey 17	Report	Pts: Paige 14; Rebs: Gagić 8 Asts: Nikolić 4 PIR: Gagić 16	Arena: La Fonteta; Attendance: 7,021; Referees: Emin Mogulkoc, Petri Mantyla, Petros Papapetrou

23 October 2018 4	Partizan (Serbia)	78–89	(France) LDLC ASVEL	Belgrade
19:00	Scoring by quarter: 20–26, 17–22, 17–19, 24–22
Sport Klub	Pts: Landale 12; Rebs: Landale, Gagić, Paige 6 Asts: Marinković, Gagić, Paige 6 PIR: Landale, Gagić, Paige 15	Report	Pts: Kahudi 21; Rebs: Kahudi, Nelson 5 Asts: Kalnietis 10; PIR: Kalnietis 24	Arena: Hall Aleksandar Nikolić; Attendance: 6,154; Referees: Carlos Cortes, Clemens Fritz, Ersan Kartal

31 October 2018 5	Türk Telekom (Turkey)	77–72	(Serbia) Partizan	Ankara
18:00	Scoring by quarter: 28–14, 18–18, 16–20, 15–20
Sport Klub	Pts: Gabriel 16; Rebs: Štimac 8 Asts: Campbell 4 PIR: Gabriel, Štimac 18	Report	Pts: Marinković 28; Rebs: Landale 14; Asts: Marinković 5 PIR: Marinković 26	Arena: Ankara Arena; Attendance: 3,738; Referees: Joseph Bissang, Amit Balak, Jordi Aliaga

6 November 2018 6	Partizan (Serbia)	76–71	(Italy) Dolomiti Energia Trento	Belgrade
20:00	Scoring by quarter: 22–7, 14–25, 20–17, 20–22
Sport Klub	Pts: Landale 18; Rebs: Janković 6 Asts: Paige 6 PIR: Landale 23	Report	Pts: Jovanović 20; Rebs: Jovanović 6 Asts: Flaccadori 6 PIR: Jovanović 25	Arena: Hall Aleksandar Nikolić; Attendance: 6,464; Referees: Benjamin Jimenez, Ingus Baumanis, Gytis Vilius

14 November 2018 7	Zenit Saint Petersburg (Russia)	75–71	(Serbia) Partizan	Saint Petersburg
18:00	Scoring by quarter: 20–22, 20–22, 18–10, 17–17
Sport Klub	Pts: Karasev 21; Rebs: Reynolds, Valiev 6 Asts: Valiev 5 PIR: Valiev 28	Report	Pts: Marinković 11; Rebs: Sy 7 Asts: Landale 4 PIR: Sy 14	Arena: Sibur Arena; Attendance: 3,576; Referees: Seffi Shemmesh, Mario Majkić, Saulius Racys

21 November 2018 8	Partizan (Serbia)	61–69	(Spain) Valencia	Belgrade
19:00	Scoring by quarter: 18–22, 18–12, 12–18, 13–17
Sport Klub	Pts: Marinković 15; Rebs: Zagorac 7 Asts: Paige 7 PIR: Paige 16	Report	Pts: Van Rossom 20; Rebs: Dubljević 12; Asts: Van Rossom, Thomas 5 PIR: Van Rossom 25	Arena: Hall Aleksandar Nikolić; Attendance: 5,250; Referees: Robert Vyklicky, Mehdi Difalla, Semen Ovinov

11 December 2018 9	LDLC ASVEL (France)	75–78	(Serbia) Partizan	Villeurbanne
20:30	Scoring by quarter: 12–17, 20–20, 25–19, 18–22
Sport Klub	Pts: Bilan 17; Rebs: Bilan 7 Asts: Kalnietis 7 PIR: Kalnietis 20	Report	Pts: Paige, Landale, Nikolić 15; Rebs: Landale 10; Asts: Paige 6 PIR: Landale 26	Arena: Astroballe; Attendance: 5,558; Referees: Jakob Zamojski, Petros Papapetrou, Sinan Isguder

19 December 2018 10	Partizan (Serbia)	87–72	(Turkey) Türk Telekom	Belgrade
20:00	Scoring by quarter: 25–21, 18–11, 23–22, 21–18
Sport Klub	Pts: Zagorac 18; Rebs: Gagić 9 Asts: Zagorac 5 PIR: Zagorac 25	Report	Pts: Štimac 21; Rebs: Gabriel 6 Asts: Campbell 8 PIR: Štimac 26	Arena: Hall Aleksandar Nikolić; Attendance: 6,061; Referees: Joseph Bissang, Ingus Baumians, Tomas Trawicki

==== Top 16: Group E ====
Pos	Team	Pld	W	L	PF	PA	PD	Qualification
1	(Germany) Alba Berlin	6	5	1	487	451	+36	Advance to quarterfinals
2	(Lithuania) Rytas	6	3	3	482	460	+22	Advance to quarterfinals
3	(France) Monaco	6	2	4	418	457	−39	
4	(Serbia) Partizan NIS	6	2	4	442	461	−19	

Source: EuroCup Basketball
Rules for classification: All points scored in extra period(s) were not counted in the standings, nor for any tie-break situation.

==== Matches ====
Win Loss

2 January 2019 1	Rytas Vilnius (Lithuania)	80–74	(Serbia) Partizan	Vilnius
18:00	Scoring by quarter: 28–23, 20–19, 17–17, 15–15
Sport Klub	Pts: Sutton 21; Rebs: Parakhouski, Echodas 8 Asts: Stipčević 7 PIR: Sutton 28	Boxscore	Pts: Zagorac 17; Rebs: Landale 9 Asts: Renfroe 8 PIR: Landale 22	Arena: Siemens Arena; Attendance: 4,693; Referees: Emilio Perez, Renaud Geller, Hugues Thepenier

9 January 2019 2	Partizan (Serbia)	78–66	(Germany) Alba Berlin	Belgrade
20:00	Scoring by quarter: 19–13, 18–15, 13–15, 28–23
Sport Klub	Pts: Marinković 14; Rebs: N. Janković 7 Asts: Renfroe 12; PIR: Renfroe 15	Boxscore	Pts: Hermannsson 16; Rebs: Nnoko 8 Asts: Sikma 8 PIR: Sikma 18	Arena: Hall Aleksandar Nikolić; Attendance: 5,323; Referees: Elias Koromilas, Jurgis Laurinavicius, Ersan Kartal

15 January 2019 3	Partizan (Serbia)	68–72	(France) Monaco	Belgrade
19:00	Scoring by quarter: 13–21, 13–19, 12–14, 30–18
Sport Klub	Pts: Nikolić 16; Rebs: Landale 7 Asts: Nikolić 5 PIR: Landale 19	Boxscore	Pts: Jones 16; Rebs: Jones 11; Asts: Needham 6 PIR: Jones 25	Arena: Hall Aleksandar Nikolić; Attendance: 6,414; Referees: Borys Ryzhyk, Robert Vyklicky, Amit Balak

22 January 2019 4	Monaco (France)	68–71	(Serbia) Partizan	Fontvieille
19:00	Scoring by quarter: 17–23, 24–15, 11–15, 16–18
Sport Klub	Pts: Lacombe 23; Rebs: Buckner 9 Asts: Kikanović 5 PIR: Lacombe 27	Boxscore	Pts: Renfroe 20; Rebs: Gagić 9 Asts: Renfroe 5 PIR: Renfroe 16	Arena: Salle Gaston Médecin; Attendance: 2,008; Referees: Benjamin Jimenez, Tomasz Trawicki, Eduard Udyanskyy

30 January 2019 5	Partizan (Serbia)	77–78	(Lithuania) Rytas Vilnius	Belgrade
20:00	Scoring by quarter: 28–30, 12–14, 17–20, 20–14
Sport Klub	Pts: Landale 14; Rebs: Renfroe 11; Asts: Renfroe 8 PIR: Renfroe 25	Boxscore	Pts: Parakhouski 22; Rebs: Kramer 7 Asts: Parakhouski 8 PIR: Parakhouski 30	Arena: Hall Aleksandar Nikolić; Attendance: 6,317; Referees: Christos Christodoulou, Aare Halliko, Renaud Geller

5 February 2019 6	Alba Berlin (Germany)	97–74	(Serbia) Partizan	Berlin
20:45	Scoring by quarter: 18–23, 29–11, 19–19, 31–21
Sport Klub	Pts: Giedraitis 19; Rebs: Sikma 11; Asts: Sikma 8 PIR: Giedraitis 24	Boxscore	Pts: Marinković 18; Rebs: N.Janković 8 Asts: Renfroe 6 PIR: Landale 15	Arena: Mercedes-Benz Arena; Attendance: 8,943; Referees: Petri Mantyla, Marcin Kowalski, Hugues Thepenier

== Adriatic Supercup ==
Win Loss

20 September 2018 Quarterfinals	Mornar (Montenegro)	77–91	(Serbia) Partizan	Laktaši
18:00	Scoring by quarter: 18–22, 26–25, 19–20, 14–24
Arena Sport	Pts: Carrington 20; Rebs: Luković 9 Asts: Vranješ 6 PIR: Luković 22	Boxscore	Pts: Gagić 23; Rebs: Gagić, Zagorac 6 Asts: Paige 8 PIR: Gagić 27	Arena: Laktaši Sports Hall; Attendance: 1,000; Referees: Saša Pukl, Mario Majkić, Aleksandar Davidov

22 September 2018 Semifinals	Partizan (Serbia)	87–90(OT)	(Montenegro) Budućnost	Laktaši
18:00	Scoring by quarter: 24–19, 25–24, 18–22, 9–11, Overtime: 11–14
Arena Sport	Pts: Marinković 19; Rebs: Landale 9 Asts: Paige 7 PIR: Landale 22	Boxscore	Pts: Clarke 17; Rebs: Šehović 7 Asts: Jackson 5 PIR: Clarke 21	Arena: Laktaši Sports Hall; Attendance: 2,000; Referees: Saša Pukl, Tomislav Hordov, Gordan Terlević

== Radivoj Korać Cup ==
Win Loss

14 February 2019 Quarterfinals	Partizan	102–72	Novi Pazar	Niš
19:30	Scoring by quarter: 26–20, 25–15, 23–19, 28–18
Arena Sport	Pts: Gagić 27; Rebs: Gagić 12; Asts: Jaramaz 7 PIR: Gagić 42	Report	Pts: Radonjić 21; Rebs: Vujović 7 Asts: Berbakov 5 PIR: Vujović 15	Arena: Čair Sports Center; Attendance: 2,000; Referees: Saša Maričić, Ivan Stefanović, Dragan Matić

16 February 2019 Semifinals	FMP	71–83	Partizan	Niš
17:00	Scoring by quarter: 16–21, 20–18, 21–24, 14–20
Arena Sport	Pts: Pot 15; Rebs: Reath 10; Asts: Rebec 6 PIR: Reath 20	Report	Pts: Landale 18; Rebs: Landale 8 Asts: Renfroe 8 PIR: Landale 25	Arena: Čair Sports Center; Attendance: 3,000; Referees: Ilija Belošević, Uroš Obrknežević, Uroš Nikolić

17 February 2019 Final	Partizan	76–74	Crvena zvezda	Niš
17:00	Scoring by quarter: 19–18, 18–15, 18–24, 21–17
Arena Sport	Pts: Landale, Renfroe 18; Rebs: Renfroe 7 Asts: Renfroe 10; PIR: Renfroe 26	Report	Pts: Baron 18; Rebs: Perperoglou, Ristić 5 Asts: Ragland 9 PIR: Ragland 20	Arena: Čair Sports Center; Attendance: 4,500; Referees: Ilija Belošević, Uroš Obrknežević, Milivoje Jovčić

== Individual awards ==
Adriatic League

MVP of the Round

- (Serbia) Vanja Marinković – Round 10
- (Serbia) Vanja Marinković – Semifinal 2

MVP of the Month

- (United States) Marcus Paige – January 2019

Ideal Starting Five

- (Australia) Jock Landale

Serbian League

Finals MVP

- (Bosnia and Herzegovina) Alex Renfroe

Radivoj Korać Cup

MVP

- (Bosnia and Herzegovina) Alex Renfroe

Top Scorer

- (Australia) Jock Landale

== Statistics ==
Legend
GP	Games played	GS	Games started	MPG	Minutes per game
FG%	Field-goal percentage	3FG%	3-point field-goal percentage	FT%	Free-throw percentage
RPG	Rebounds per game	APG	Assists per game	SPG	Steals per game
BPG	Blocks per game	PPG	Points per game	PIR	PIR per game

=== ABA League ===
Player	GP	GS	MPG	2FG%	3FG%	FT%	RPG	APG	SPG	BPG	PPG	PIR
Nikola Janković	8	0	16.1	.657	.000	.500	3.5	1.4	0.8	0.1	7.8	9.6
Marcus Paige	21	11	25.4	.440	.369	.739	2.5	4.4	1.4	0.2	12.2	12.2
Uroš Trifunović	2	0	3.0	.000	.000	.000	0.0	0.5	0.0	0.0	0.0	-0.5
Bandja Sy	20	15	22.3	.738	.375	.741	3.5	1.4	0.9	0.1	6.8	8.2
Aleksandar Aranitović	5	0	15.6	.364	.231	.929	2.6	1.0	1.8	0.2	6.0	6.0
Vanja Marinković	20	18	27.4	.473	.303	.732	2.5	1.8	0.7	0.1	11.5	7.8
Ognjen Jaramaz	1	0	17.0	.667	.500	.714	4.0	1.0	2.0	0.0	12.0	16.0
Amar Gegić	16	5	11.7	.565	.200	.563	1.1	0.4	0.4	0.1	2.6	1.6
Novica Veličković	13	2	9.3	.538	.125	.857	2.3	1.0	0.2	0.1	4.2	4.5
Marko Pecarski	7	3	8.0	.400	.143	.571	2.3	0.7	0.1	0.3	2.1	2.9
Dušan Tanasković	1	0	2.0	.000	.000	.000	0.0	0.0	0.0	0.0	0.0	0.0
Rade Zagorac	15	3	22.9	.574	.259	.667	3.9	2.9	1.1	0.4	9.8	10.5
Alex Renfroe	9	6	23.4	.452	.471	.556	3.9	5.6	0.8	0.1	9.0	11.2
Stefan Janković	16	9	17.5	.462	.545	.720	4.2	0.9	0.7	0.6	6.8	8.1
Jock Landale	21	16	24.2	.628	.375	.761	6.2	1.9	0.6	1.1	12.3	16.1
Đorđe Gagić	21	10	12.3	.596	.000	.714	3.1	0.6	0.4	0.3	7.5	8.2
Aleksej Nikolić	17	5	21.1	.387	.204	.881	1.8	2.4	1.2	0.0	6.9	6.8
Players that left club during the season
Anthony Brown	1	0	1.0	.000	.000	.000	0.0	0.0	0.0	0.0	0.0	-2.0
Strahinja Gavrilović	4	1	5.8	.000	.000	.000	1.2	0.3	0.8	0.0	0.0	0.5

=== EuroCup ===
Player	GP	GS	MPG	2FG%	3FG%	FT%	RPG	APG	SPG	BPG	PPG	PIR
Nikola Janković	5	1	15:55	.636	.000	.308	4.6	0.2	0.4	0.2	6.4	6.8
Marcus Paige	15	7	26:47	.432	.348	.840	2.6	3.7	0.7	0.3	10.9	10.1
Uroš Trifunović	0	0	00:00	.000	.000	.000	0.0	0.0	0.0	0.0	0.0	0.0
Bandja Sy	15	11	22:42	.636	.314	.846	3.9	1.1	0.9	0.4	5.7	6.7
Aleksandar Aranitović	4	0	10:44	.800	.000	1.000	0.8	0.5	0.0	0.3	2.5	1.3
Vanja Marinković	16	15	29:07	.435	.356	.727	2.3	2.3	0.4	0.1	12.4	8.0
Amar Gegić	12	3	12:07	.588	.200	.667	1.3	0.8	0.3	0.2	2.4	2.5
Novica Veličković	10	2	8:26	.278	.111	.667	2.0	0.7	0.1	0.1	1.7	0.5
Marko Pecarski	8	2	4:16	1.000	.000	.500	0.9	0.0	0.0	0.3	0.9	1.5
Dušan Tanasković	1	1	10:37	1.000	.000	.000	2.0	0.0	0.0	0.0	6.0	6.0
Rade Zagorac	11	3	21:25	.592	.278	.783	3.7	2.2	1.5	0.3	9.6	10.6
Alex Renfroe	6	6	26:55	.200	.300	.929	4.3	7.3	1.0	0.2	8.0	13.5
Stefan Janković	13	9	15:36	.459	.280	.900	2.8	0.7	0.3	0.7	4.9	3.3
Jock Landale	16	12	25:06	.683	.381	.481	6.5	1.8	0.5	0.7	11.2	15.1
Đorđe Gagić	15	5	13:05	.520	.000	.619	3.9	0.9	0.4	0.5	6.9	7.4
Aleksej Nikolić	16	3	20:59	.550	.417	.903	1.9	2.6	0.4	0.0	8.3	9.3
Players that left club during the season
Anthony Brown	2	0	8:53	.000	.000	.000	3.0	0.5	0.0	0.0	0.0	0.0
Strahinja Gavrilović	8	3	15:21	.538	.000	.800	2.4	0.5	0.4	0.1	5.0	3.8

=== Radivoj Korać Cup ===
Player	GP	GS	MPG	2FG%	3FG%	FT%	RPG	APG	SPG	BPG	PPG	PIR
Nikola Janković	3	0	13:20	.600	.333	.000	3.0	1.5	0.6	0.3	7.5	6.3
Marcus Paige	3	0	16:35	.000	.166	.000	2.0	3.0	1.0	0.3	3.0	2.3
Uroš Trifunović	1	0	10:00	.660	.000	.000	1.0	0.0	0.0	0.0	4.0	5.0
Bandja Sy	3	3	21:37	.500	.526	.333	3.5	2.5	1.0	0.0	8.5	9.0
Aleksandar Aranitović	0	0	00:00	.000	.000	.000	0.0	0.0	0.0	0.0	0.0	0.0
Vanja Marinković	3	2	24:14	.250	.513	.220	2.5	0.0	0.3	0.6	10.0	5.3
Ognjen Jaramaz	3	0	21:11	.250	.333	.000	2.0	4.5	0.0	0.0	1.0	4.0
Amar Gegić	3	1	10:45	.000	.166	.000	0.5	2.5	0.0	0.0	1.5	1.3
Novica Veličković	3	3	21:50	.643	.333	.803	5.0	3.0	0.3	0.6	8.5	12.3
Marko Pecarski	1	0	16:11	.830	.500	.500	6.0	1.0	0.0	0.0	14.0	16.0
Dušan Tanasković	0	0	00:00	.000	.000	.000	0.0	0.0	0.0	0.0	0.0	0.0
Rade Zagorac	Did not play (injury)											
Alex Renfroe	3	3	22:20	.543	.396	.190	3.5	6.5	1.0	0.0	12.5	20.3
Stefan Janković	2	0	3:40	1.000	.000	.750	1.0	0.0	0.0	0.0	3.0	2.0
Jock Landale	3	3	21:14	.650	1.000	.570	5.5	1.5	0.3	0.6	15.0	21.0
Đorđe Gagić	3	0	12:02	.960	.000	.523	6.0	0.5	0.3	0.3	14.5	16.6
Aleksej Nikolić	Did not play (injury)											

=== ABA Super Cup ===
Player	GP	GS	MPG	2FG%	3FG%	FT%	RPG	APG	SPG	BPG	PPG	PIR
Marcus Paige	2	2	32.5	.333	.373	.000	3.0	7.5	2	0.5	9.5	10.5
Uroš Trifunović	0	0	0.0	.000	.000	.000	0.0	0.0	0.0	0.0	0.0	0.0
Bandja Sy	Did not play (injury)											
Aleksandar Aranitović	2	0	10.0	.500	.000	.000	1.5	1.5	2.5	0.0	2.0	4.5
Vanja Marinković	2	2	31.5	.667	.400	1.000	4.0	1.5	0.5	0.0	17.5	15.5
Amar Gegić	2	0	22.0	.500	.000	.500	1.0	1.5	0.5	0.5	3.5	1.0
Novica Veličković	Did not play (injury)											
Marko Pecarski	1	0	5.0	1.000	.000	.000	2.0	1.0	0.0	0.0	2.0	4.0
Rade Zagorac	2	2	33.0	.667	.222	.400	7.0	4.5	3.0	0.5	12.0	20.5
Jock Landale	2	2	23.0	.625	.333	.800	5.5	3.0	0.0	2.0	15.5	15.5
Đorđe Gagić	2	0	20.0	.619	.000	.750	5.0	0.0	1.0	0.0	16.0	14.5
Aleksej Nikolić	2	0	21.0	.500	.500	.750	3.5	3.0	0.5	0.0	8.0	10.5
Players that left club during the season
Strahinja Gavrilović	2	2	12.5	.500	.667	.000	3.0	0.0	0.5	0.0	4.0	4.5
