= Serbia at the EuroBasket 2022 qualification =

Serbia
- Flag of Serbia
- President: Predrag Danilović
- Head coach: Igor Kokoškov
- Arena: Aleksandar Nikolić Hall
- Qualifiers: Qualified
- PIR leader: Danilo Anđušić 19.8
- Scoring leader: Danilo Anđušić 20.3
- Rebounding leader: Miroslav Raduljica 5.3
- Assists leader: Danilo Anđušić 4.3
- Highest home attendance: 5,000; 90–94 Georgia (23 February 2020)
- Lowest home attendance: As highest
- Average home attendance: 5,000
- Biggest win: +26; 92–66 Georgia (19 February 2021)
- Biggest defeat: -4; 90–94 Georgia (23 February 2020)
- All statistics correct as of February 21, 2021.

The Serbia team for EuroBasket 2022 qualification represents Serbia at the EuroBasket 2022 qualification. The team was coached by Igor Kokoškov, with assistant coaches Dejan Milojević, Vladimir Jovanović, and Jovica Antonić.

The qualification tournament was largely affected by COVID-19 pandemic in Europe. Due to the pandemic Serbia roster played only one game in Belgrade. Afterwards, Serbia got qualified for EuroBasket following the Gameday 5 victory over Georgia on 19 February 2021. The team finished the qualification with the first place in Group E with a 4–2 record.

== Background ==
As a participant in the second round of the 2019 FIBA Basketball World Cup qualification, Serbia was qualified for the second stage of the EuroBasket 2022 qualification.

The EuroBasket 2022 was originally scheduled to take place in 2021, but due to the COVID-19 pandemic and the subsequent postponement of the 2020 Summer Olympics to 2021, it has been postponed to 2022.

== Timeline ==
- 27 January 2020: Coaching and team staff announced
- 11 February 2020: 15-man first window roster announced
- 20–23 February 2020: The first window
- 22 June 2020: Training camp roster announced
- ~~24 June 2020: Players gathering in Belgrade~~
- ~~25 June – 5 July 2020: Training camp at Kopaonik~~
- 6 November 2020: 20-man second window roster announced
- 28–30 November 2020: The second window
- 12 February 2021: 16-man second window roster announced
- 18–21 February 2021: The third window

== Roster ==
On 11 February 2020, head coach Igor Kokoškov announced a 15-man roster for the first window games against Finland on 20 February and Georgia on 23 February. Center Miroslav Raduljica and forward Marko Simonović are the only members of Serbia roster at the 2019 FIBA Basketball World Cup included into the February roster. On 17 February, guard Luka Ašćerić was added to the roster due to an injury of the guard Ognjen Dobrić. Even he was shortlisted, guard Miloš Teodosić wasn't added to the roster due to a demand of his club Virtus Bologna. Guards Nikola Rebić and Uroš Trifunović, forwards Dalibor Ilić and Stefan Đorđević, and center Dejan Kravić made their senior debut with the Serbian national team.

In June 2020, forward Milan Mačvan, a team captain at EuroBasket 2017, announced his retirement from his basketball career at age 31.

On 6 November 2020, head coach Kokoškov announced a 20-man roster for the second window games against Switzerland on 28 November and Finland on 30 November. Guards Ašćerić, Dobrić, Teodosić, Ognjen Jaramaz, forwards Novica Veličković and Dejan Todorović, and center Raduljica were unlisted, while eleven new players were called in. Forward Simonović was selected as the new team captain due to Raduljica's inability to play on the second window. Guard Danilo Anđušić make the first appearance with the national team since the EuroBasket 2013, while forward Nemanja Dangubić previously played at the 2016 FIBA World Olympic Qualifying Tournament. On 23 November, Kokoškov selected a 14-man roster, cutting guards Rebić, Nikola Radičević, Trifunović, Stefan Momirov and centers Filip Petrušev and Đorđević from the 20-man roster. Guards Stefan Pot and Marko Jeremić, forward Boriša Simanić, and center Dragan Apić made their senior debut with the Serbian national team.

On 12 February 2021, head coach Kokoškov announced a 16-man roster for the third window games against Georgia on 19 February and Switzerland on 21 February. Guards Pot, Jovan Novak, Stefan Peno, Jeremić, and Aleksa Radanov, forwards Simonović, Simanić and Rade Zagorac, and center Kravić were unlisted, while eleven new players were called in, of whom guards Ašćerić, Jaramaz, and Rebić, and centers Raduljica and Đorđević returned from the first window roster. Guards Vasilije Micić and Marko Gudurić are two new members of the 2019 Serbia FIBA World Cup team included into the third window roster. On 16 February, forward Simanić was re-added to the roster while center Đorđević was cut from the roster. Guards Gudurić and Micić won't be with the squad for the Georgia game due to a schedule conflict with EuroLeague. Afterwards, guards Gudurić and Micić were cut from the roster following the victory over Georgia which resulted the Serbia's qualification for EuroBasket. Forward Marko Luković, and centers Petrušev and Marko Radovanović made their senior debut with the Serbian national team.

The following are all players who appeared at least in one game during the EuroBasket 2022 qualification:

Serbia national basketball team – EuroBasket 2022 qualification roster
Players
Coaches

Pos.	No.	Name	Age – Date of birth	Height	Club	Ctr.
F/C	3	Filip Petrušev	20 – April 15, 2000	2.08 m (6 ft 10 in)	Mega Soccerbet	(Serbia)
SF	5	Marko Simonović (DC)	34 – May 30, 1986	2.03 m (6 ft 8 in)	Crvena zvezda	(Serbia)
SF	6	Nemanja Dangubić	27 – April 13, 1993	2.04 m (6 ft 8 in)	Partizan	(Serbia)
PG	9	Stefan Pot	26 – July 15, 1994	1.96 m (6 ft 5 in)	Igokea	(Bosnia and Herzegovina)
SG	9	Nemanja Nenadić	27 – January 2, 1994	1.97 m (6 ft 6 in)	FMP	(Serbia)
PG	10	Ognjen Jaramaz	26 – January 9, 1995	1.93 m (6 ft 4 in)	Partizan	(Serbia)
PG	10	Jovan Novak	26 – November 8, 1994	1.88 m (6 ft 2 in)	Fuenlabrada	(Spain)
C	11	Dejan Kravić	30 – September 9, 1990	2.13 m (7 ft 0 in)	San Pablo Burgos	(Spain)
SG	12 (Note: Radanov wore jersey No. 6 in the first window.)	Aleksa Radanov	23 – February 1, 1998	2.02 m (6 ft 8 in)	Crvena zvezda	(Serbia)
PF	12	Novica Veličković	34 – October 5, 1986	2.05 m (6 ft 9 in)	Partizan	(Serbia)
C	13	Miroslav Raduljica (C)	33 – January 5, 1988	2.13 m (7 ft 0 in)	Zhejiang Lions	(China)
C	18	Dragan Apić	25 – October 3, 1995	2.06 m (6 ft 9 in)	Budućnost	(Montenegro)
SF	20	Dejan Todorović (injured)	26 – May 29, 1994	1.96 m (6 ft 5 in)	Tenerife	(Spain)
G	21	Luka Ašćerić	24 – January 10, 1997	2.01 m (6 ft 7 in)	JL Bourg	(France)
SF	25	Rade Zagorac	25 – August 12, 1995	2.05 m (6 ft 9 in)	Partizan	(Serbia)
PF	28	Boriša Simanić	22 – March 20, 1998	2.11 m (6 ft 11 in)	Crvena zvezda	(Serbia)
PG	30	Aleksa Avramović (DC)	26 – October 25, 1994	1.92 m (6 ft 4 in)	Estudiantes	(Spain)
F/C	31	Marko Radovanović	24 – April 3, 1996	2.08 m (6 ft 10 in)	FMP	(Serbia)
SG	32	Uroš Trifunović	20 – December 5, 2000	1.99 m (6 ft 6 in)	Partizan	(Serbia)
SG	33	Danilo Anđušić	29 – April 22, 1991	1.95 m (6 ft 5 in)	JL Bourg	(France)
SG	34	Marko Jeremić	29 – November 23, 1991	1.92 m (6 ft 4 in)	Mornar	(Montenegro)
SF	42 (Note: Ilić wore jersey No. 22 in the first two windows.)	Dalibor Ilić	20 – March 4, 2000	2.06 m (6 ft 9 in)	Igokea	(Bosnia and Herzegovina)
PG	44	Nikola Rebić	26 – January 22, 1995	1.88 m (6 ft 2 in)	Nanterre 92	(France)
PG	44	Stefan Peno	23 – August 3, 1997	2.01 m (6 ft 7 in)	Rasta Vechta	(Germany)
PF	45	Stefan Đorđević	22 – December 4, 1998	2.06 m (6 ft 9 in)	FMP	(Serbia)
PF	55	Marko Luković	28 – May 26, 1992	2.08 m (6 ft 10 in)	Split	(Croatia)

Head coach

- (Serbia) Igor Kokoškov

Assistant coach(es)

- (Serbia) Jovica Antonić
- (Serbia) Dejan Milojević
- (Serbia) Vladimir Jovanović

Legend

- (C) Team captain
- (DC) Deputy captain
- Club – describes club
  on 21 February 2021
- Age – describes age
  on 21 February 2021

=== Depth chart ===
==== The first window ====
The following is the first window depth chart, February 2020.

Pos.	Starting 5	Bench 1	Bench 2	Reserves
C	Miroslav Raduljica	Dejan Kravić
PF	Marko Simonović	Novica Veličković		Stefan Đorđević
SF	Dejan Todorović	Rade Zagorac	Dalibor Ilić
SG	Ognjen Jaramaz	Aleksa Radanov	Uroš Trifunović	Luka Ašćerić (Note: Ašćerić was not in the roster for any game.)
PG	Nikola Rebić	Aleksa Avramović

==== The second window ====
The following is the second window depth chart, November 2020.

Pos.	Starting 5	Bench 1	Bench 2	Reserves
C	Dragan Apić	Dejan Kravić
PF	Boriša Simanić	Marko Simonović
SF	Nemanja Dangubić	Aleksa Radanov	Rade Zagorac	Dalibor Ilić
SG	Danilo Anđušić	Aleksa Avramović	Marko Jeremić
PG	Stefan Pot	Stefan Peno		Jovan Novak (Note: Novak did not play any game. He was in the roster for a game with Switzerland.)

==== The third window ====
The following is the third window depth chart, February 2021.

Pos.	Starting 5	Bench 1	Bench 2	Reserves
C	Miroslav Raduljica	Dragan Apić	Marko Radovanović
PF	Filip Petrušev	Boriša Simanić	Marko Luković
SF	Danilo Anđušić	Nemanja Dangubić		Dalibor Ilić (Note: Ilić did not play any game. He was in the roster for a game with Switzerland.)
SG	Ognjen Jaramaz	Luka Ašćerić		Nemanja Nenadić (Note: Nenadić did not play any game. He was in the roster for a game with Switzerland.)
PG	Nikola Rebić	Aleksa Avramović

=== 2020 training camp ===
On 22 June 2020, head coach Kokoškov announced a 31-man roster for a 10-day training camp at Kopaonik. Center Nikola Janković withdrew after tested positive for SARS-CoV-2, the virus responsible for the COVID-19 pandemic. On the same day, center Stefan Đorđević tested positive for COVID-19. The Basketball Federation of Serbia canceled the training camp following Đorđević testing positive for COVID-19.

The following was the Serbia roster for the training camp.

- Miloš Teodosić
- Miroslav Raduljica
- Stefan Jović
- Vasilije Micić
- Nemanja Nedović
- Nikola Kalinić
- Ognjen Jaramaz
- Rade Zagorac
- Stefan Birčević
- Uroš Trifunović
- Nikola Janković
- Novica Veličković
- Luka Ašćerić
- Nikola Rebić
- Branko Lazić
- Ognjen Dobrić
- Dejan Davidovac
- Boriša Simanić
- Nikola Jovanović
- Ognjen Kuzmić
- Stefan Đorđević
- Stefan Pot
- Marko Pecarski
- Aleksa Radanov
- Marko Radovanović
- Aleksa Avramović
- Nemanja Dangubić
- Luka Mitrović
- Dalibor Ilić
- Stefan Janković
- Aleksej Pokuševski

== Staff ==
At the end of the 2019 FIBA Basketball World Cup where Serbia won 5th place, head coach Aleksandar Đorđević announced his decision to leave the position after six years. On 20 November 2019, the Basketball Federation of Serbia named Igor Kokoškov the new head coach of the Serbia team. In December, Dejan Milojević and Vladimir Jovanović were named assistant coaches. On 27 January, coach Kokoškov announced the full staff.

Head coach Kokoškov was not able to lead Serbia on the 19 February game against Georgia due to a schedule conflict with EuroLeague. On the same date Kokoškov will lead Fenerbahçe. Assistant coach Milojević acted as the head coach on the 19 February game.

Position	Staff member	Age	Team
Head coach	(Serbia) Igor Kokoškov	49	(Turkey) Fenerbahçe
Assistant coaches	(Serbia) Jovica Antonić	54	(Serbia) Konstantin
Assistant coaches	(Serbia) Dejan Milojević	43	(Montenegro) Budućnost VOLI
Assistant coaches	(Serbia) Vladimir Jovanović	36	(Croatia) Cibona
Conditioning coach	(Serbia) Vladimir Koprivica	68	None
Scout	(Serbia) Bogdan Karaičić	36	None
Team manager	(Serbia) Nebojša Ilić	52	(Serbia) Crvena zvezda mts
Physician	(Serbia) Milan Mirković	—	None
Physiotherapists	(Serbia) Dušan Sajić	—	None
Physiotherapists	(Serbia) Velibor Kosanović	—	None
Equipment manager	(Serbia) Jovica Aničić	—	None

Age – describes age on 21 February 2021

Source: KSS

== Uniform ==
- Supplier: Peak
- Main sponsor: Austiger
- Back sponsor: Triglav (below number)
- Shorts sponsor: mts

Home	Away

== Qualification ==
The draw was held on 22 July 2019 in Munich, Germany. Serbia was drawn into Group E with Finland, Georgia, and the Pre-Qualifiers Group H winner. These matches will be played in three windows from 17 to 25 February 2020; from 23 November to 1 December 2020 and from 15 to 23 February 2021 with two games played by each team in every window.

Group E is one of eight qualifiers groups of four teams. The groups will be conducted in a round-robin system, with each team playing all other teams in the respective group in home and away games. Georgia as the host and the two other highest placed teams will qualify for the EuroBasket 2021.

On 21 August, Switzerland won Pre-Qualifiers Group H and advance to the next round joining Serbia and others in Group E. On 8 October, FIBA announced the group hosts for November 2020. The Group E held two rounds of the second window in Espoo, Finland. On 4 December, FIBA announced the group hosts for February 2021. The Group E will play two rounds of the third window in Tbilisi, Georgia.

Serbia got qualified for EuroBasket 2022 following the Gameday 5 win over Georgia on 19 February 2021.

=== Group E ===
Pos	Team	Pld	W	L	PF	PA	PD	Pts	Qualification
1	Serbia	6	4	2	515	457	+58	10 (Note: Serbia 182–160 Georgia)	EuroBasket 2022
2	Georgia	6	4	2	508	517	−9	10	EuroBasket 2022 as host
3	Finland	6	3	3	448	464	−16	9	EuroBasket 2022
4	Switzerland	6	1	5	493	526	−33	7	

Source: FIBA
Rules for classification: 1) Points; 2) Head-to-head; 3) Points difference; 4) Points scored.

==== Finland (Away game) ====
RTS1

20 February 2020
19:00 (EET)

Boxscore

Finland	58–80	Serbia
Scoring by quarter: 10–19, 14–18, 13–23, 21–20
Pts: Topias Palmi 16; Rebs: Tuukka Kotti 6 Asts: Palmi, Salin, Lindbom 3 each		Pts: Miroslav Raduljica 19; Rebs: Veličković, Raduljica, Zagorac 8 each Asts: four players 3 each

Espoo Metro Areena, Espoo
Attendance: not available
Referees: Yohan Rosso (FRA), Tolga Sahin (ITA), Andrei Sharapa (BLR)

==== Georgia (Home game) ====
RTS1

23 February 2020
17:00 (CET)

Boxscore

Serbia	90–94	Georgia
Scoring by quarter: 28–18, 20–23, 19–24, 23–29
Pts: Aleksa Avramović 27; Rebs: Raduljica, Zagorac 5 each Asts: Ognjen Jaramaz 6		Pts: Thad McFadden 33; Rebs: Giorgi Shermadini 11; Asts: Thad McFadden 7

Aleksandar Nikolić Hall, Belgrade
Attendance: 5,000
Referees: Antonio Conde (ESP), Carsten Straube (GER), Luis Castillo (ESP)

==== Switzerland (Away game) ====
RTS1

28 November 2020
16:30 (EET)

Boxscore

Switzerland	92–90	Serbia
Scoring by quarter: 28–25, 21–19, 24–28, 19–18
Pts: Marko Mlađan 16; Rebs: Jonathan Kazadi 8 Asts: Jonathan Kazadi 7		Pts: Aleksa Avramović 23; Rebs: Dragan Apić 6 Asts: Pot, Avramović, Anđušić 4 each

Espoo Metro Areena, Espoo
Attendance: Behind closed doors
Referees: Sergii Zashchuk (UKR), Janusz Calik (POL), Vilius Mačiulaitis (LTU)

==== Finland (Home game) ====
RTS1

30 November 2020
19:00 (EET)

Boxscore

Serbia	75–66	Finland
Scoring by quarter: 17–7, 18–18, 20–20, 20–21
Pts: Danilo Anđušić 19; Rebs: Nemanja Dangubić 7 Asts: Radanov, Apić, Peno 3 each		Pts: Edon Maxhuni 15; Rebs: Elias Valtonen 6 Asts: Edon Maxhuni 6

Espoo Metro Areena, Espoo
Attendance: Behind closed doors
Referees: Yohan Rosso (FRA), Sergii Zashchuk (UKR), Alexey Davydov (RUS)

==== Georgia (Away game) ====
RTS1

19 February 2021
19:00 (EET)

Boxscore

Georgia	66–92	Serbia
Scoring by quarter: 10–13, 21–24, 20–28, 15–27
Pts: Giorgi Shermadini 20; Rebs: Giorgi Shermadini 8 Asts: Berishvili, Sanadze, Bakradze 3 each		Pts: Filip Petrušev 27; Rebs: Filip Petrušev 6 Asts: Danilo Anđušić 5

Tbilisi Sports Palace, Tbilisi
Attendance: Behind closed doors
Referees: Georgios Poursanidis (GRE), Oskars Lucis (LAT), Kerem Baki (TUR)

Head coach Kokoškov missed the game due to the schedule conflict with EuroLeague. Instead of him, assistant coach Milojević led the team from the bench. Center Filip Petrušev recorded 27 points, 6 rebounds, and two assists on his senior team debut. As a result of the Serbia's victory, they have got qualified for EuroBasket 2022.

==== Switzerland (Home game) ====
RTS1

21 February 2021
16:00 (EET)

Boxscore

Serbia	88–81	Switzerland
Scoring by quarter: 21–21, 18–20, 19–28, 30–12
Pts: Filip Petrušev 22; Rebs: Aleksa Avramović 9 Asts: Danilo Anđušić 6		Pts: Dušan Mlađan 18; Rebs: Kazadi, Dubas 5 each Asts: Jonathan Kazadi 8

Tbilisi Sports Palace, Tbilisi
Attendance: Behind closed doors
Referees: Georgios Poursanidis (GRE), Oskars Lucis (LAT), Apostolos Kalpakas (SWE)

== Awards ==
Team of Gamedays

Gameday	Player	PIR	Ref.
1	Miroslav Raduljica	26	

== Statistics ==
=== Player statistics ===
Legend
GP	Games played	GS	Games started	MPG	Minutes per game
FG%	Field-goal percentage	3FG%	3-point field-goal percentage	FT%	Free-throw percentage
RPG	Rebounds per game	APG	Assists per game	SPG	Steals per game
BPG	Blocks per game	PPG	Points per game	EF	PIR per game

Player	GP	GS	MPG	FG%	3FG%	FT%	RPG	APG	SPG	BPG	PPG	EF
Danilo Anđušić	4	4	30.4	.625	.565	.786	2.5	4.3	0.5	0.3	20.3	19.8
Dragan Apić	4	1	17.3	.571	.000	.824	3.5	1.3	0.5	0.3	9.5	11.0
Luka Ašćerić	2	0	5.7	.000	1.000	.000	1.5	1.0	0.5	0.0	1.5	3.5
Aleksa Avramović	6	0	25.6	.643	.389	.679	4.5	2.8	1.2	0.2	15.7	16.7
Nemanja Dangubić	3	3	21.4	.500	.222	.000	4.7	0.7	0.0	0.0	6.0	6.0
Stefan Đorđević	1	0	2.2	.000	.000	.000	0.0	0.0	0.0	0.0	0.0	0.0
Dalibor Ilić	2	1	4.9	.667	.000	.000	2.0	0.0	0.5	0.0	2.0	3.5
Ognjen Jaramaz	4	4	21.4	.636	.417	.889	1.5	3.8	1.8	0.0	9.3	10.8
Marko Jeremić	2	0	8.5	.000	.000	.000	2.0	0.5	1.0	0.0	0.0	2.0
Dejan Kravić	4	1	14.1	.571	.000	.250	2.8	0.3	0.0	1.0	2.3	4.3
Marko Luković	2	0	9.3	1.000	.000	1.000	0.5	1.0	0.5	0.0	5.0	5.0
Nemanja Nenadić	Did not play											
Jovan Novak	Did not play											
Stefan Peno	2	1	10.8	.000	.000	.000	0.5	3.0	0.5	0.0	0.0	1.0
Filip Petrušev	2	2	34.1	.680	.500	.750	7.0	2.5	1.5	0.5	24.5	28.5
Stefan Pot	2	1	14.9	.400	.000	.500	3.5	2.5	0.5	0.0	2.5	4.5
Aleksa Radanov	4	1	8.3	.667	.000	.500	1.0	0.8	0.0	0.3	1.5	1.8
Marko Radovanović	1	0	2.6	.000	.000	.000	1.0	0.0	0.0	1.0	0.0	1.0
Miroslav Raduljica	4	4	20.5	.542	1.000	.733	5.3	1.5	0.5	0.5	10.0	13.0
Nikola Rebić	4	2	23.3	.455	.438	.833	3.3	2.3	0.8	0.0	9.0	10.3
Boriša Simanić	4	1	13.8	.667	.429	1.000	1.3	0.5	0.0	0.3	4.8	4.8
Marko Simonović	3	2	23.4	.571	.143	.846	3.3	1.0	0.0	0.3	7.3	7.3
Dejan Todorović	2	2	18.0	.333	.333	.000	5.5	0.5	0.0	0.0	6.0	6.0
Uroš Trifunović	1	0	4.5	.500	1.000	1.000	0.0	0.0	0.0	0.0	5.0	3.0
Novica Veličković	2	0	11.7	.167	.000	1.000	5.5	2.5	0.0	0.0	3.0	8.0
Rade Zagorac	3	0	23.6	.429	.133	.750	5.7	0.3	1.3	1.0	7.0	6.3
Total	6	6	200.0	.571	.359	.756	38.2	18.0	6.2	2.8	85.8	98.2

Last updated: February 21, 2021.
Source: EuroBasket 2021 qualification

== Aftermath ==
Serbia got qualified for EuroBasket 2022 following the Gameday 5 victory over Georgia on 19 February 2021. The team finished the qualification with the first place in Group E with a 4–2 record.

The EuroBasket 2022 draw took place on 29 April 2021 in Berlin, Germany. Serbia was drawn into Group D with the Czech Republic, Finland, Israel, Netherlands, and Poland. The games will be played from 2 to 8 September 2022 at the O2 Arena in Prague, Czech Republic.

Four months following the qualification tournament the Serbia roster entered the 2020 FIBA Men's Olympic Qualifying Tournament in Belgrade, Serbia. It was originally scheduled to take place from 23 to 28 June 2020 but was postponed due to the COVID-19 pandemic, to 29 June to 4 July 2021.

== See also ==
- Italy team for EuroBasket 2021 qualification
