= Lapornik =

Lapornik is a surname. Notable people with the surname include:

- Luka Lapornik (born 1988), Slovene basketball player
- Miha Lapornik (born 1993), Slovene basketball player
