= Dušan Tanasković =

Serbian basketball player (born 2001)

Vojvodina
- Position: Center / power forward
- League: KLS

Personal information
- Born: February 23, 2001 (age 25) Smederevska Palanka, FR Yugoslavia
- Listed height: 2.08 m (6 ft 10 in)
- Listed weight: 103 kg (227 lb)

Career information
- Playing career: 2018–present

Career history
- 2018–2022: Partizan NIS
- 2018–2021: → Mladost Zemun
- 2021–2022: → Dunav
- 2022–2023: Borac WWIN
- 2023–2024: MZT Skopje
- 2024–2025: Mega Basket
- 2025: Borac WWIN
- 2025–2026: MZT Skopje
- 2026–present: Vojvodina

Career highlights
- 2x Macedonian League champion (2024, 2026); 2x Macedonian Cup winner (2024, 2026); Serbian Cup winner (2019)
Medals
Men's basketball
Representing Serbia
FIBA Europe Under-16 Championship
Bronze medal – third place	2017 Montenegro	U16 team

Dušan Tanasković (Serbian Cyrillic: Душан Танасковић, born February 23, 2001) is a Serbian professional basketball player who plays for Vojvodina.

== Professional career ==
Tanasković began his basketball career at the youth system with Partizan Belgrade. Prior to the 2018–19 season, Tanasković was loaned out to Mladost Zemun as a two-way affiliate player, making him available for the senior roster of Partizan. On December 22, 2018, Tanasković made his Adriatic League debut with Partizan in a home win over Cedevita, making no records in under 3 minutes of playing time. On February 5, 2019, at age 17, he debuted in the EuroCup in a loss to Alba Berlin, recording 6 points and 2 rebounds in under 11 minutes of playing time. On February 28, Tanasković signed his first professional contract for Partizan. Through 20 games in the 2018–19 Serbian First League with Mladost Zemun, Tanasković averaged 8.2 points, 6 rebounds, and 1.6 blocks in 22 minutes per game.

== National team career ==
Tanasković was a member of the Serbian under-16 national team that won the bronze medal at the 2017 FIBA Europe Under-16 Championship in Montenegro. Over seven tournament games, he averaged 4.3 points, 4.4 rebounds and 0.6 assists per game. He was a member of the Serbian under-17 team that participated at the 2018 FIBA Under-17 Basketball World Cup in Argentina. Over three tournament games, he averaged 9.4 points, 5.3 rebounds and 1.3 blocks per game.

== Personal life ==
His older brother Nikola is a basketball player.
