= Vasilije Pušica =

Serbian basketball player (born 1995)

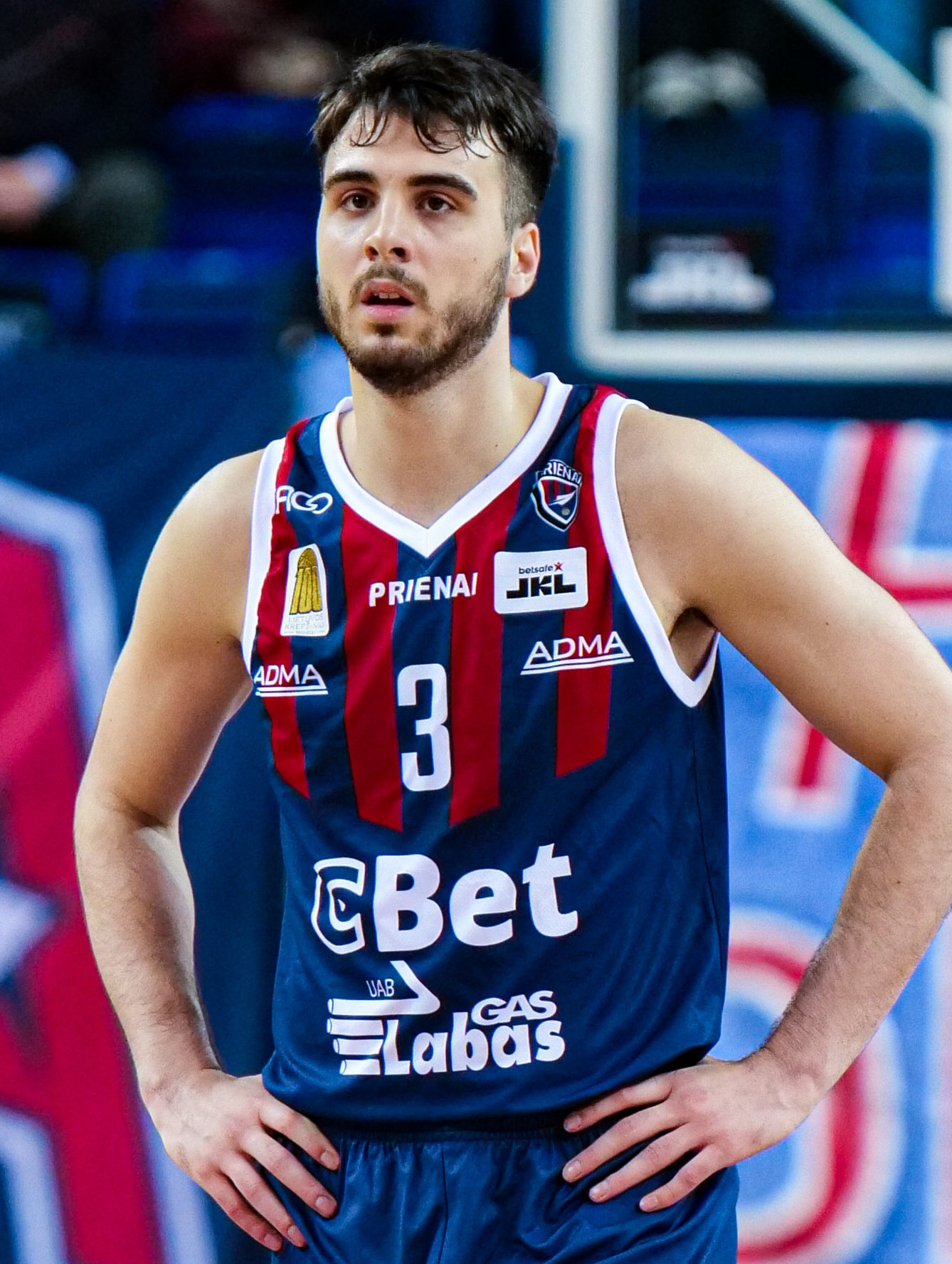
- Pušica with BC Prienai in 2021

Keravnos
- Position: Shooting guard / point guard
- League: Cyprus Basketball Division A

Personal information
- Born: September 12, 1995 (age 31) Belgrade, Serbia, FR Yugoslavia
- Listed height: 1.96 m (6 ft 5 in)
- Listed weight: 92 kg (203 lb)

Career information
- High school: Sunrise Christian Academy (Bel Aire, Kansas)
- College: San Diego (2014–2016); Northeastern (2017–2019)
- NBA draft: 2019: undrafted
- Playing career: 2019–present

Career history
- 2019: Partizan
- 2019–2020: VL Pesaro
- 2020–2021: Dinamo Sassari
- 2021–2022: Prienai
- 2022: Galatasaray
- 2022–2023: Twarde Pierniki Toruń
- 2023: Śląsk Wrocław
- 2023: Avtodor
- 2024: Astana
- 2024–2025: Igokea
- 2025–2026: Büyükçekmece
- 2026–present: Keravnos

Career highlights
- Bosnian League champion (2025); Bosnian Cup winner (2025); 2× First-team All-CAA (2018, 2019); CAA tournament MVP (2019)

Vasilije "Vasa" Pušica (Serbian Cyrillic: Василије "Васа" Пушица, born September 12, 1995) is a Serbian professional basketball player for Keravnos of the Cyprus Basketball Division A. He played college basketball for the University of San Diego and Northeastern University.

== Early career ==
Pušica started to play basketball in his hometown Belgrade, for the Partizan youth selections.

In 2013, Pušica was recruited to attend a prep school in Kansas, U.S., Sunrise Christian Academy in Bel Aire, a suburb of Wichita. During the 2013–14 season, he averaged 9.3 points and 5.0 rebounds per game.

== College career ==
=== San Diego Toreros (2014–2016) ===
In the Toreros' 2014–15 season, Pušica appeared in 30 games with one start and averaged 4.6 points per game to go along with 2.1 rebounds and a team-leading 74 assists. In the Toreros' 2015–16 season, Pušica appeared in 30 games, making 15 starts and averaged 8.3 points per game to go along with 4.0 rebounds and a team-leading 74 assists.

=== Northeastern Huskies (2016–2019) ===
In 2016, was Pušica transferred from San Diego. Under NCAA transfer rules, he had to sit out for the 2016–17 season. Pušica finished his first season with the Huskies as the team's leading scorer with 17.9 points per game, while pulling down 3.6 rebounds per game and dishing out 5.1 assists per game while playing and starting in all 33 games. Also, he added 36 steals while shooting 50.4 percent from the field and 42.7 percent from deep and 80.7 from the free throw line. Pušica appeared in 27 games, including 26 starts in the Huskies' 2018–19 season. He averaged 17.4 points, 3.8 rebounds and 4.1 assists per game.

== Professional career ==
=== Partizan (2019) ===
On April 24, 2019, Pušica signed for Partizan NIS of the Basketball League of Serbia.

=== Italian Serie A (2019–2021) ===
On August 3, 2019, he has signed with VL Pesaro of the Italian Lega Basket Serie A (LBA).

On June 23, 2020, Pušica signed in the same league, for Dinamo Sassari for the 2019–20 season. He averaged 12.9 points, 3.8 assist and 1.4 steals per game.

=== 2021–22 season ===
On July 21, 2021, Pušica signed with Baxi Manresa of the Spanish Liga ACB. However, his contract was voided after he failed the physical. On August 18, Pušica signed with BC Labas GAS Prienai of the Lithuanian Basketball League. He averaged 8.2 points and 4.5 assists per game.

On February 25, 2022, Pušica signed with Galatasaray Nef of the Basketbol Süper Ligi and Basketball Champions League.

=== 2022–23 season ===
On July 9, 2022, he has signed with FMP of the Basketball League of Serbia and the ABA League. However, he parted ways with FMP on August 1.

On November 16, 2022, he signed with Twarde Pierniki Toruń of the Polish Basketball League (PLK). He quit the team at the end of January 2023, without notifying anyone in the club about his departure. He cited "stomachache" as the reason for his leaving. He didn't say a word to the management about it and he threw a tantrum about it.

On February 8, 2023, he signed with Śląsk Wrocław of the PLK.

=== 2024–25 season ===
On August 7, 2024, he signed with Igokea of the ABA League.

=== 2025–26 season ===
On December 21, 2025, he signed with ONVO Büyükçekmece of the Basketbol Süper Ligi (BSL).

== National team career ==
Pušica was a member of the Serbian under-16 team that played at the 2011 FIBA Europe Under-16 Championship in the Czech Republic. Over seven tournament games, he averaged 4.0 points, 1.5 rebounds and 1.4 assists per game. Pušica was a member of the Serbian under-18 team that played at the 2013 FIBA Europe Under-18 Championship in Latvia. Over seven tournament games, he averaged 7.9 points, 9.2 rebounds and 2.7 assists per game.
