= Bandja Sy =

French basketball player (born 1990)

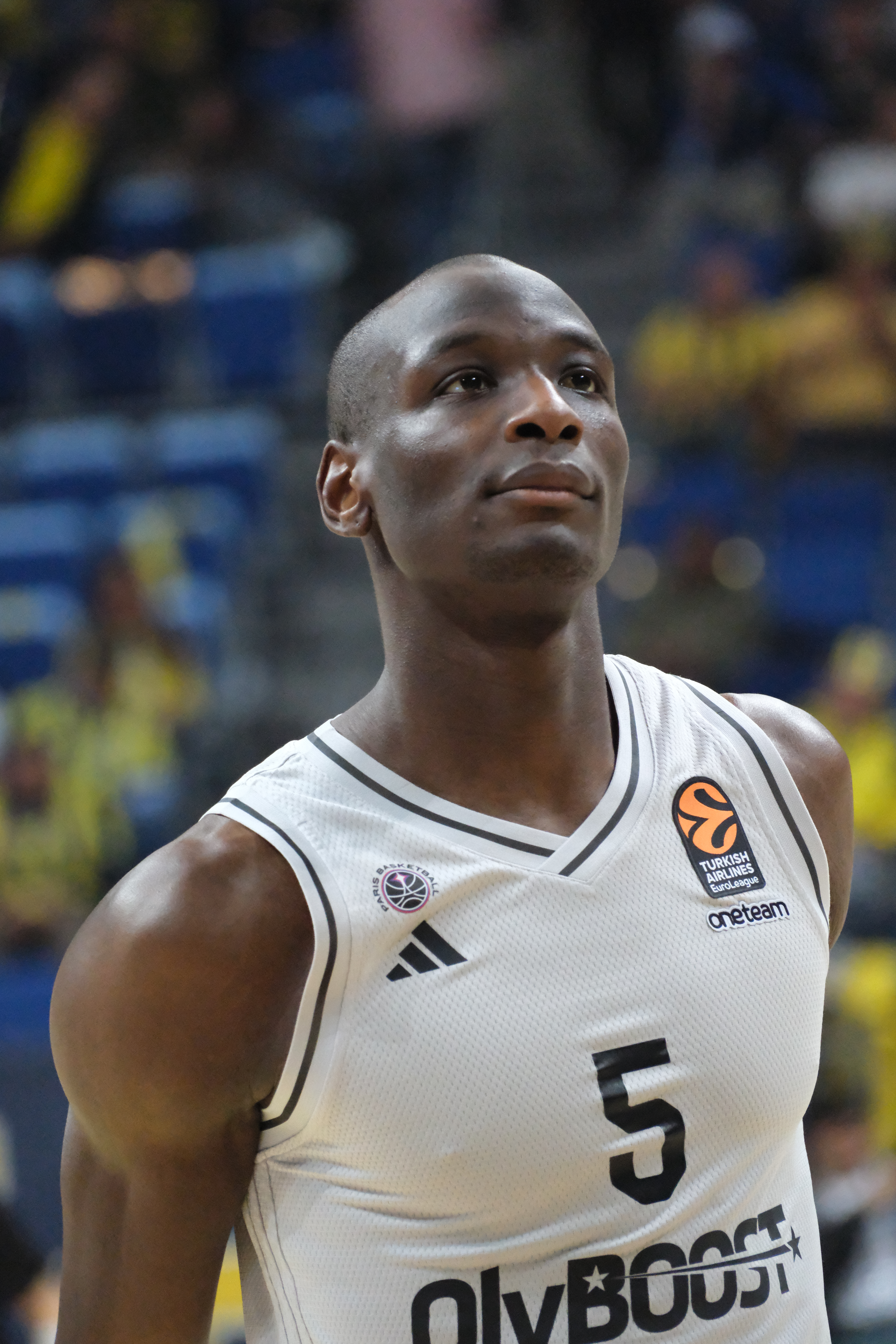
- Sy with Paris Basketball in 2025

Lietkabelis Panevėžys
- Position: Power forward / center
- League: LKL; EuroCup

Personal information
- Born: July 30, 1990 (age 36) Paris, France
- Listed height: 2.05 m (6 ft 9 in)
- Listed weight: 100 kg (220 lb)

Career information
- High school: Stoneridge Preparatory School (Simi Valley, California)
- College: New Mexico State (2009–2013)
- NBA draft: 2013: undrafted
- Playing career: 2013–present

Career history
- 2013–2014: Élan Béarnais
- 2014–2016: SLUC Nancy
- 2016–2017: ASVEL
- 2017–2018: AEK Athens
- 2018–2019: Partizan
- 2019–2021: Andorra
- 2021–2023: Metropolitans 92
- 2023–2025: Paris Basketball
- 2025–2026: CSM Oradea
- 2026: Partizan
- 2026–present: Lietkabelis Panevėžys

Career highlights
- EuroCup champion (2024); French League champion (2025); French Cup winner (2025); Leaders Cup winner (2024); 2× Serbian Cup winner (2018, 2019); First-team All-WAC (2013)

Bandja Sy (born July 30, 1990) is a Malian-French professional basketball player for Lietkabelis Panevėžys of the Lithuanian Basketball League (LKL) and the EuroCup. Standing at 2.05 m (6 ft 9 in), he plays at the power forward and center positions. After playing four years of college basketball at New Mexico State, Sy entered the 2013 NBA draft, but he was not selected in the draft's two rounds. He is the brother of Amara Sy.

== High school career ==
Sy joined the Aggies after the 2008–09 season at Stoneridge Prep in Simi Valley, California. He averaged 18 points and four rebounds a game. Sy attended the Adidas National Tournament in the summers of 2008 and 2009. At the Douais Tournament, he was named the best wing player and played in the all-star game. In August 2007, Sy was selected to attend Basketball without Borders Europe in Paris, France. The NBA and FIBA conduct the camp as part of the NBA's global basketball development and community outreach program.

== College career ==
=== New Mexico State ===
Sy played college basketball at New Mexico State University, with the New Mexico State Aggies, from 2009 to 2013. As a freshman, Sy was a role player, appearing in 15 games for the Aggies. He averaged 1.5 points and 0.9 rebounds per game. As a sophomore, Sy played in all 33 games and started in 20 contests for the Aggies, averaging 4.7 points and 2.7 rebounds per game. In his third season with the Crimson and White, Sy played in all 36 games and started in two contests. He averaged 8.8 points and 4.0 rebounds per game and shot 45.5 percent from the field and 32.8 percent from the 3-point line. In his final season with the Aggies, Sy was a first team All-WAC honoree. He led the Aggies in rebounding with 7.3 rebounds per game and was second on the squad in scoring with 11.9 points per game. Sy was the only Aggie to start in all 35 games in 2012–13.

== Professional career ==
=== Élan Béarnais (2013–2014) ===
After going undrafted in the 2014 NBA draft, Sy returned to France and joined Élan Béarnais Pau-Orthez of the LNB Pro A. During his rookie season, Sy averaged 5.8 points and 3.8 rebounds in 18.3 minutes per game.

=== SLUC Nancy (2014–2016) ===
After one season, he left Orthez and joined SLUC Nancy. He stayed with the team for two seasons, playing in 33 games and averaging 8.2 points and 4.3 rebounds per game.

=== ASVEL (2016–2017) ===
On June 24, 2016, he joined ASVEL Basket of the LNB Pro A and the Champions League. With ASVEL, at LNB Pro A, he averaged 5.7 points and 2.8 rebounds per game and 8 points and 3.5 rebounds per game at Champions League, being one of the most spectacular players due to his amazing dunks.

=== AEK Athens (2017–2018) ===
On September 15, 2017, Sy left ASVEL and joined AEK Athens of the Greek Basket League, replacing Cleanthony Early on the team's squad, who left due to disciplinary reasons.

=== Partizan (2018–2019) ===
On January 17, 2018, he left AEK and signed with Serbian club Partizan for the rest of the 2017–18 season. On March 2, Sy has signed a new contract until summer 2019.

=== Andorra (2019–2021) ===
On September 8, 2019, Sy signed with Andorra of the Liga ACB.

=== Metropolitans 92 (2021–2023) ===
On August 11, 2021, he signed with Metropolitans 92 of the LNB Pro A.

=== Paris Basketball (2023–2025) ===
On August 10, 2023, he signed with Paris Basketball of the LNB Pro A (BBL).

=== CSM Oradea (2025–2026) ===
On August 1, 2025, he signed with CSM Oradea of the Liga Națională.

=== Return to Partizan (2026) ===
On September 28, 2026, Sy signed a one-month contract with Partizan of the Serbian SuperLeague, the ABA League, and the EuroLeague.

=== Lietkabelis Panevėžys (2026–present) ===
On October 30, 2026, Sy signed a three-month deal with Lietkabelis Panevėžys of the Lithuanian Basketball League (LKL).

== Career statistics ==
=== Domestic Leagues ===
==== Regular season ====
Legend
GP	Games played	MPG	Minutes per game	FG%	Field goal percentage
3P%	3-point field goal percentage	FT%	Free throw percentage	RPG	Rebounds per game
APG	Assists per game	SPG	Steals per game	BPG	Blocks per game
PPG	Points per game	**Bold**	Career high		Led the league

Note: Only games in the primary domestic competitions are included. Therefore, games in cup or European competitions are left out.

Year	Team	League	GP	MPG	FG%	3P%	FT%	RPG	APG	SPG	BPG	PPG
2017–18	A.E.K.	GBL	18	21.7	.461	.333	.667	2.0	0	0.3	0.3	5.0

=== FIBA Champions League ===
Year	Team	GP	MPG	FG%	3P%	FT%	RPG	APG	SPG	BPG	PPG
2016–17	ASVEL	18	21.7	.519	.348	.567	3.6	.9	.8	.3	8.1
2017–18	A.E.K.	5	7.6	.375	.000	.000	1.2	0	.6	0	1.2
