= Aleksej Nikolić =

Slovenian basketball player (born 1995)

No. 5 – Galatasaray
- Position: Point guard
- League: BSL; Champions League

Personal information
- Born: 21 February 1995 (age 31) Postojna, Slovenia
- Listed height: 191 cm (6 ft 3 in)
- Listed weight: 92 kg (203 lb)

Career information
- NBA draft: 2017: undrafted
- Playing career: 2013–present

Career history
- 2011–2015: Spars Sarajevo
- 2015–2018: Brose Bamberg
- 2015–2017: →Baunach Young Pikes
- 2018–2021: Partizan NIS
- 2019–2020: →Universo Treviso Basket
- 2021: BCM Gravelines-Dunkerque
- 2021–2022: San Pablo Burgos
- 2022: Dinamo Sassari
- 2022–2023: Germani Brescia
- 2023: Gran Canaria
- 2023–2024: Élan Chalon
- 2024–2026: Cedevita Olimpija
- 2026–present: Galatasaray

Career highlights
- 2× Slovenian League champion (2025, 2026); Slovenian Cup winner (2025, 2026); 2× Slovenian Supercup winner (2024, 2025); Slovenian League Finals MVP (2025); Italian Cup winner (2023); German Cup winner (2017)
Medals
Men's basketball
Representing Slovenia
EuroBasket
Gold medal – first place	2017 Finland–Israel–Romania–Turkey

Aleksej Nikolić (born 21 February 1995) is a Slovenian professional basketball player for Galatasaray of the Basketbol Süper Ligi (BSL) and Basketball Champions League. He is a 1.91 m tall point guard.

== Professional career ==
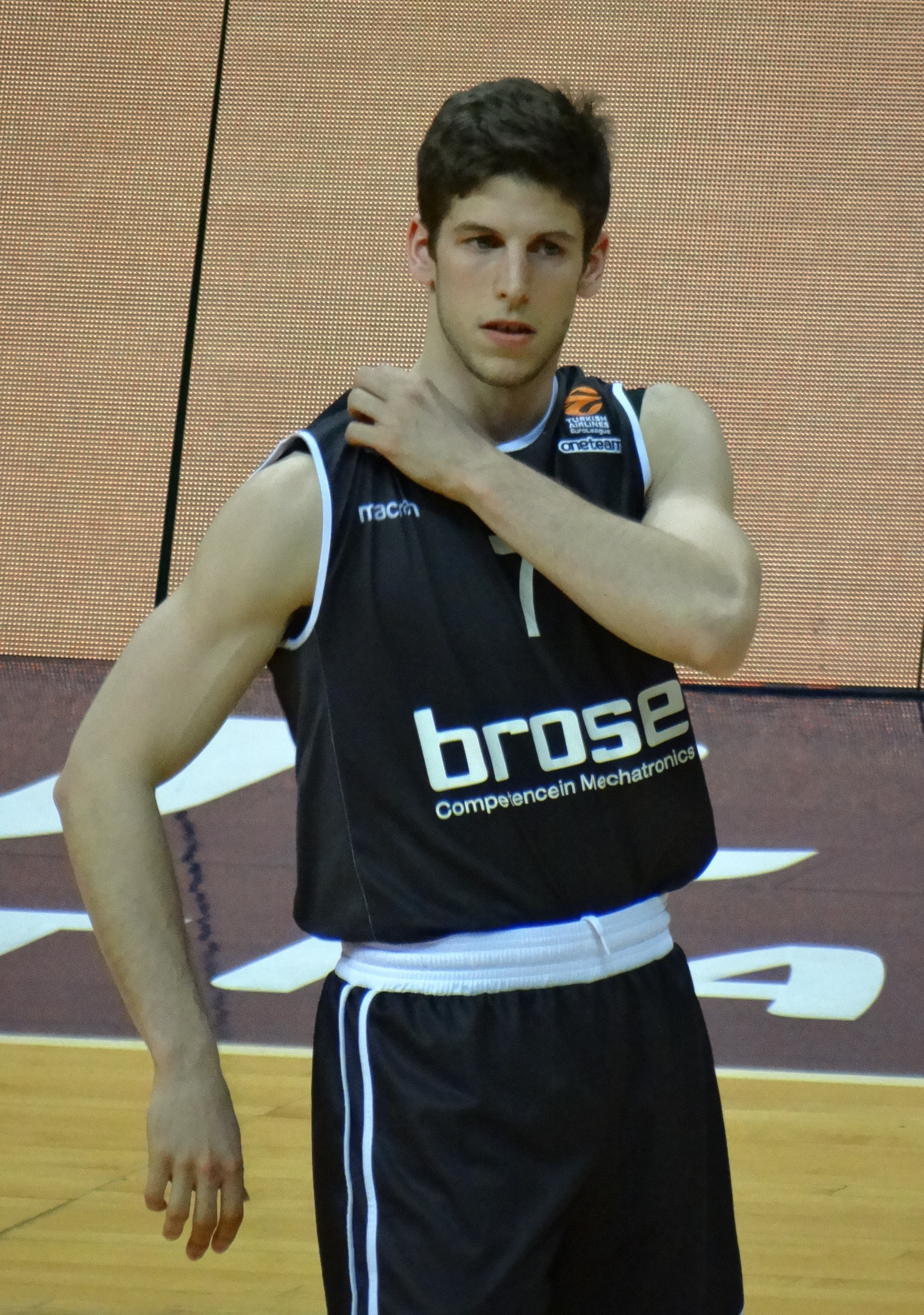
Nikolić playing with Bamberg in 2018

In November 2011 he joined OKK Spars, and previously played for Zlatorog Laško and Postojna.

On 25 February 2013 he signed a four-year contract with OKK Spars.

After rumors in early June, Nikolic had signed officially, on 7 July 2015, with German champions Brose Bamberg for four years. He also plays their for farm team Bike-Café Messingschlager Baunach in the second-tier ProA league. He was an early entry candidate for the 2016 NBA draft, but later removed his name from the list.

On 10 July 2018 he signed a three-year contract with Partizan.

On 9 August 2019 he signed one more year deal with Partizan, then he was loaned to Universo Treviso Basket of the Lega Basket Serie A (LBA). On 10 May 2020 his loan expired and he returned to Partizan.

On 27 July 2021 he signed with San Pablo Burgos of the Spanish Liga ACB.

On 14 October 2022 he signed with Dinamo Sassari of the Italian Lega Basket Serie A (LBA).

On 8 December 2022 he signed with Germani Brescia of the Italian Lega Basket Serie A (LBA).

On 11 May 2022 he signed with CB Gran Canaria of the Spanish Liga ACB until the end of the season.

In July 2023, he signed a one-year contract with Élan Chalon of the French LNB Élite.

On 12 June 2024, he signed a two-year contract with Cedevita Olimpija of the Slovenian Basketball League, the ABA League and the EuroCup.

On July 9, 2026, he signed a one-year deal with Galatasaray of the Basketbol Süper Ligi (BSL) and the Champions League.

== Slovenian national team ==
Nikolić played for Slovenia U-16, U-18 and U-20 national team.

As a member of the senior men's Slovenian national basketball team, Nikolić competed at the FIBA World Cup 2014. He played three games, including the one against the USA.

== Personal ==
Nikolić is of Serb origin. Aleksej is the son of David (originally from Leskovac) and Jana Nikolić. His father was a basketball player, played for Postojna, and was an assistant coach of Slovenian senior national team from 2004 to 2006. His brother Mitja is also a pro basketball player.
