= Nikola Janković (basketball) =

Serbian basketball player (born 1994)

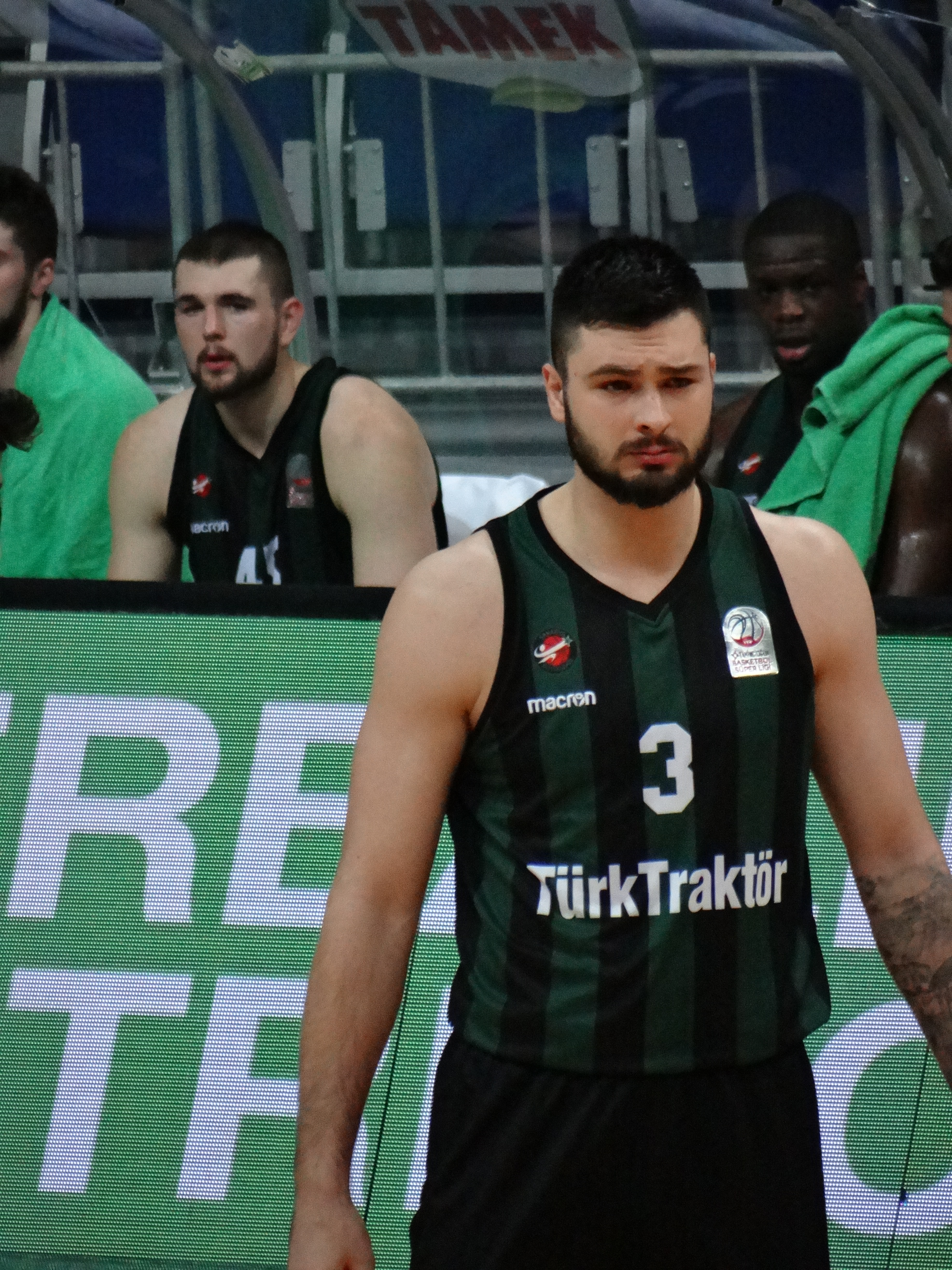
- Janković with Sakarya BB in 2018

No. 13 – Metalac Valjevo
- Position: Power forward / center
- League: Serbian First League

Personal information
- Born: February 13, 1994 (age 32) Vranje, FR Yugoslavia
- Listed height: 2.06 m (6 ft 9 in)
- Listed weight: 111 kg (245 lb)

Career information
- NBA draft: 2016: undrafted
- Playing career: 2012–2024, 2026–present

Career history
- 2012–2015: Spirou Charleroi
- 2013–2015: →Verviers-Pepinster
- 2015–2016: Mega Leks
- 2016–2017: Union Olimpija
- 2017–2018: Sakarya BB
- 2018: Estudiantes
- 2019–2021: Partizan
- 2021: Podgorica
- 2021: Mega
- 2022: Breogán
- 2022–2023: FMP
- 2023: Mega
- 2024: Mahram Tehran
- 2026–present: Metalac Valjevo

Career highlights
- ABA League MVP (2017); ABA League Supercup winner (2019); 3× Serbian Cup winner (2016, 2019, 2020); Slovenian League champion (2017); Slovenian Cup winner (2017); Slovenian Cup MVP (2017)
Medals
Men's basketball
Representing Serbia
U20 European Championship
| Bronze medal – third place | 2014 Greece | U-20 Team |
U19 World Championship
| Silver medal – second place | 2013 Czech Republic | U-19 Team |
U18 European Championship
| Silver medal – second place | 2011 Poland | U-18 Team |
| Bronze medal – third place | 2012 Lithuania/Latvia | U-18 Team |

Nikola Janković (Serbian: Никола Јанковић, born February 13, 1994) is a Serbian professional basketball player for Metalac Valjevo of the Serbian First League. Standing at 2.06 m (6 ft 9 in), he plays the power forward position.

== Early life and career ==
Janković began training basketball with the hometown club KK Ekonomac. At age 13, he transferred played to the youth system of FMP Železnik and Crvena zvezda.

== Professional career ==
=== Belgium ===
After turning 18, in 2012 he refused to sign a professional contract with the club from Belgrade, only to move to Belgium's Spirou Charleroi. Over the season, he averaged 5.2 points and 2.6 rebounds per game in his first international season.

Before the 2013–14 season, he moved to Verviers-Pepinster. In the new team he had much bigger role, averaging 11.4 points and 5.7 rebounds over 34 games played. In 2014–15 season, he appeared in just 18 games, averaging 16.1 points and 6.2 rebounds in 24.9 minutes per game. On June 5, 2015, he returned to Spirou Charleroi, only to part ways with the team in late August.

=== Mega Leks ===
Following the departure from Spirou Charleroi, he trained with the Serbian team Mega Leks, also playing friendly games with the –team starting with September. On September 18, 2015, he signed with Mega Leks. In February 2016, Mega Leks won the first trophy in the club's history, as they won the 2016 Serbian Cup. The 2015–16 season was the most successful season for the club since founding; they also advanced to the finals of the 2015–16 ABA League, where they lost to Crvena zvezda. Over 29 games played in the ABA League, Janković averaged 9.3 points and 6.1 rebounds per game.

=== Union Olimpija ===
On August 17, 2016, Janković signed a contract with the Slovenian team Union Olimpija. On March 16, 2017, he was named the ABA League MVP for the 2016–17 season. He finished the regular season with an index rating of 19.24 per game. Janković averaged 16.6 points, 7.3 rebounds per game and was the fifth best scorer and the fifth best rebounder.

=== Sakarya BB ===
On July 10, 2017, Janković signed with Turkish club Sakarya BB.

=== Movistar Estudiantes ===
On July 6, 2018, Janković signed a 1+1 deal with Movistar Estudiantes of the Liga ACB.

=== Partizan ===
On December 31, 2018, Janković signed with Serbian club Partizan for the rest of the 2018–19 season.

On June 15, 2020, Janković tested positive for COVID-19.

=== Río Breogán ===
On December 28, 2021, Janković signed with Río Breogán of the Liga ACB.

== Serbian national team ==
Janković has successfully performed for the younger representative categories. At the Under-18 European Championships he won two medals - a silver in Poland 2011 and bronze in Lithuania/Latvia 2012. In 2013 he was part of the team that came up to silver medal at the Under-19 World Championship. In 2014 he won another bronze medal - this time with the youth team at the Under-20 European Championship. He was named in the All-Tournament ideal five, averaging 15.5 points and 9.1 rebounds per game.

== Awards and accomplishments ==
- Under-20 European Championship All-Tournament Team (2014)
