= Marko Jeremić =

Serbian basketball player

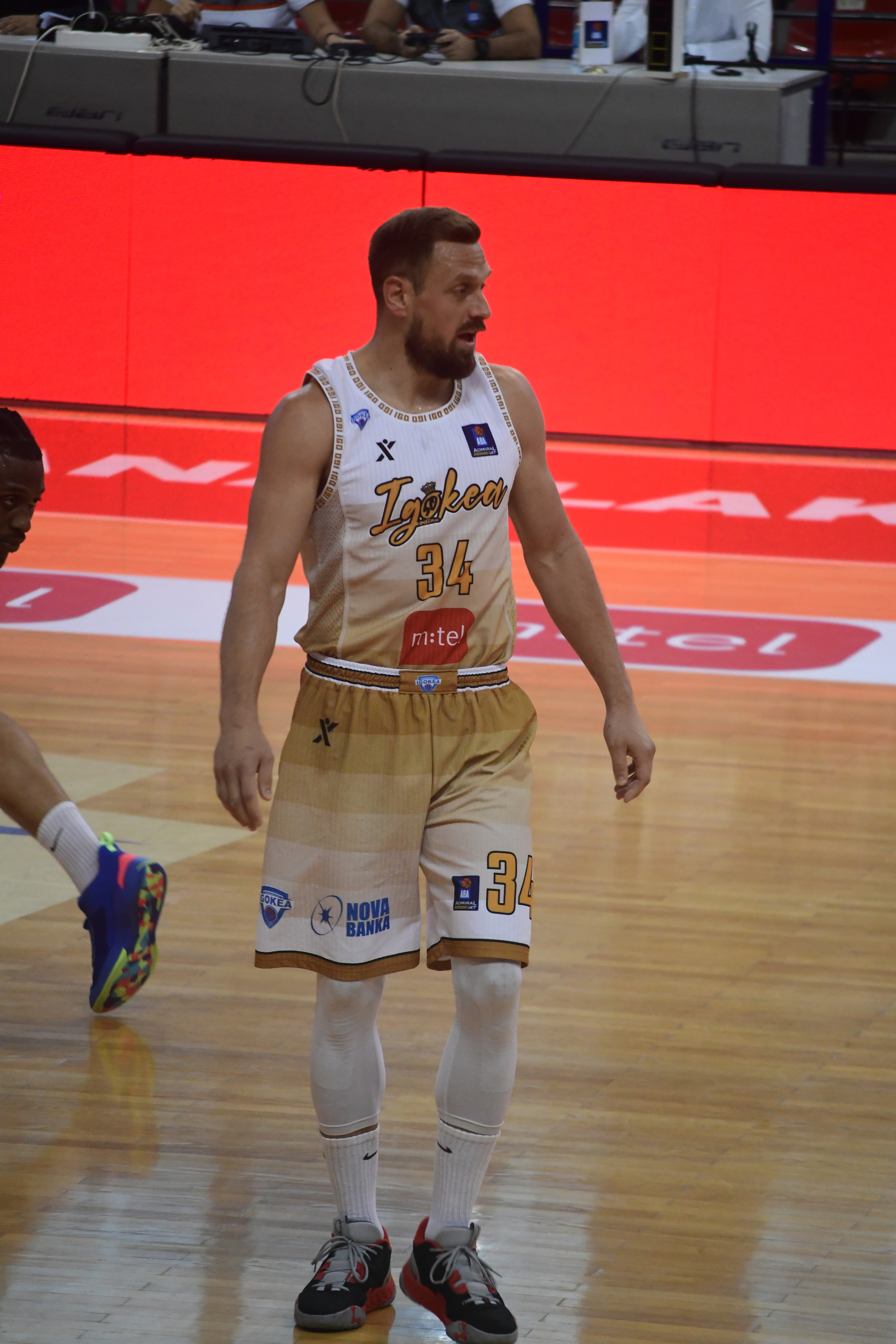

No. 6 – Spartak Subotica
- Position: Shooting guard
- League: Serbian SuperLeague; ABA League; FIBA Champions League

Personal information
- Born: November 23, 1991 (age 34) Novi Sad, SR Serbia, SFR Yugoslavia
- Listed height: 1.92 m (6 ft 4 in)
- Listed weight: 89 kg (196 lb)

Career information
- NBA draft: 2013: undrafted
- Playing career: 2010–present

Career history
- 2012–2014: Vojvodina
- 2014–2015: Vojvodina Srbijagas
- 2015–2016: Mladost Mrkonjić Grad
- 2016–2017: Napredak Kruševac
- 2017–2020: FMP
- 2020–2022: Mornar
- 2022–2023: Cedevita Olimpija
- 2023–2026: Igokea
- 2026–present: Spartak Subotica

Career highlights
- Slovenian League champion (2023); 2× Bosnian League champion (2024, 2025); Slovenian Cup winner (2023); Bosnian Cup winner (2025)

Marko Jeremić (Serbian Cyrillic: Марко Јеремић; born November 23, 1991) is a Serbian professional basketball player for Spartak Subotica of the Serbian SuperLeague, the ABA League, and the FIBA Champions League.

== Playing career ==
Jeremić played youth basketball for the BFC Beočin.

Jeremić played for Vojvodina from Novi Sad in the Second League of Serbia, and for the 2014–15 season, he moved to the city rival Vojvodina Srbijagas, which plays in the strongest league in Serbia. Jeremić also played for the Napredak Rubin from the Basketball League of Serbia. He played for the Mladost Mrkonjić Grad of the Championship of Bosnia and Herzegovina.

On September 13, 2017, Jeremić signed a two-year deal with Serbian club FMP.

On 21 June 2020, Jeremić signed for a Monterenegin team Mornar.

On 26 July 2022, Jeremić signed a 1+1 contract for a Slovenian team Cedevita Olimpija.

== National team career ==
Jeremić made his debut for the Serbia men's national team during the EuroBasket 2022 qualification.
