= Luka Lapornik =

Slovenian basketball player

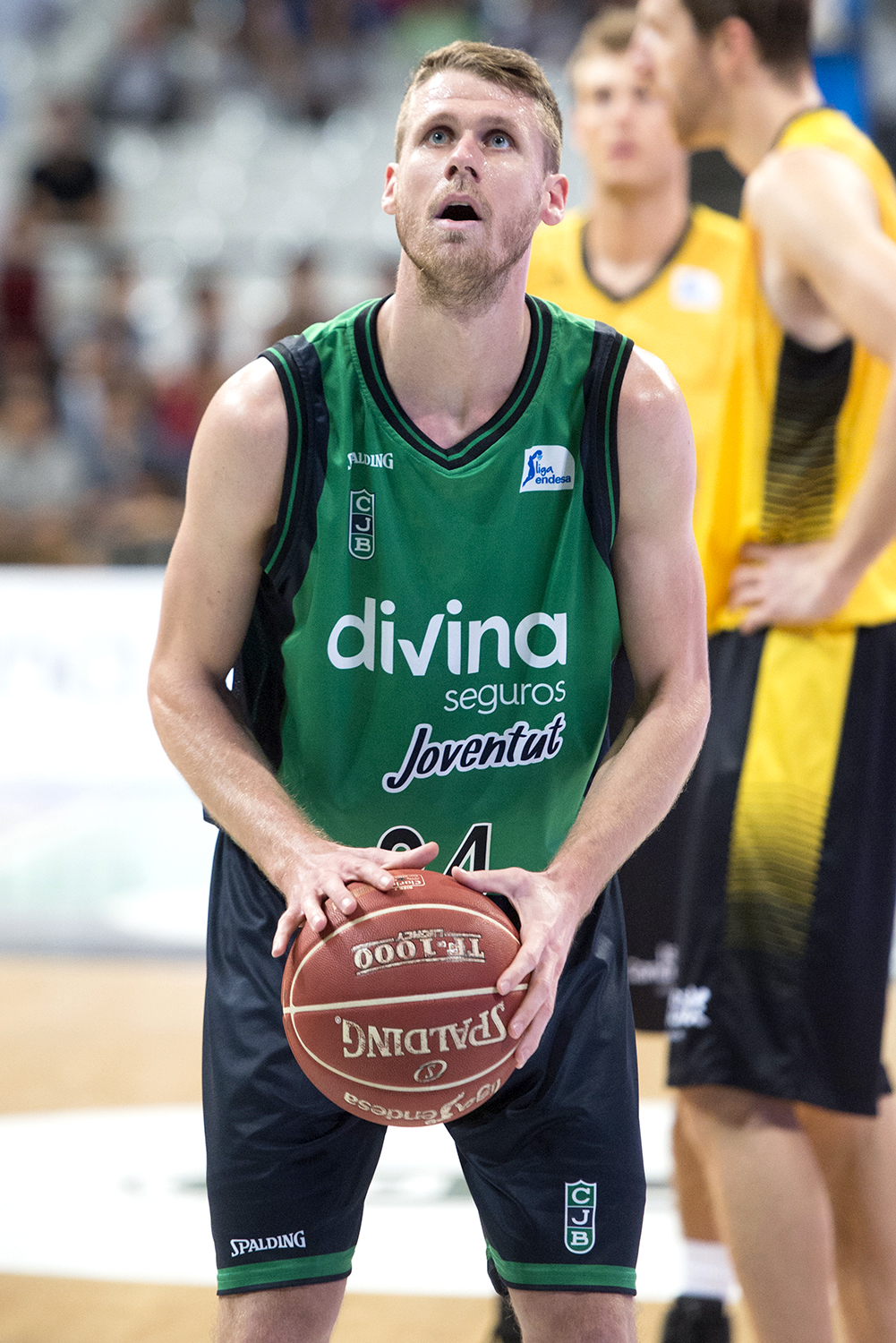

No. 24 – Šentjur
- Position: Shooting guard / small forward
- League: Liga Nova KBM

Personal information
- Born: 24 October 1988 (age 38) Celje, SFR Yugoslavia
- Listed height: 1.95 m (6 ft 5 in)

Career information
- Playing career: 2007–present

Career history
- 2007–2010: Šentjur
- 2010–2013: Zlatorog Laško
- 2013–2016: Krka
- 2016–2017: Joventut Badalona
- 2017–2018: Steaua București
- 2018–2022: Krka
- 2022–2023: Élan Chalon
- 2023–present: Šentjur

Career highlights
- Slovenian League champion (2014); 4× Slovenian Cup winner (2014–2016, 2021); 2× Slovenian Cup MVP (2016, 2021)

Luka Lapornik (born 24 October 1988) is a Slovenian professional basketball player for Šentjur of the Slovenian First Division. He is a 1.95 m (6 ft 5 in) tall swingman.

== Slovenia national team ==
Lapornik was called by coach Božidar Maljković to help the Slovenia national team prepare for the Eurobasket 2011 tournament. He played five friendly games, scoring 4 points. Again he was called to preparations before Eurobasket 2013. He played seven friendly games, scoring 10 points.
