= Luka Ašćerić =

Serbian-Austrian basketball player

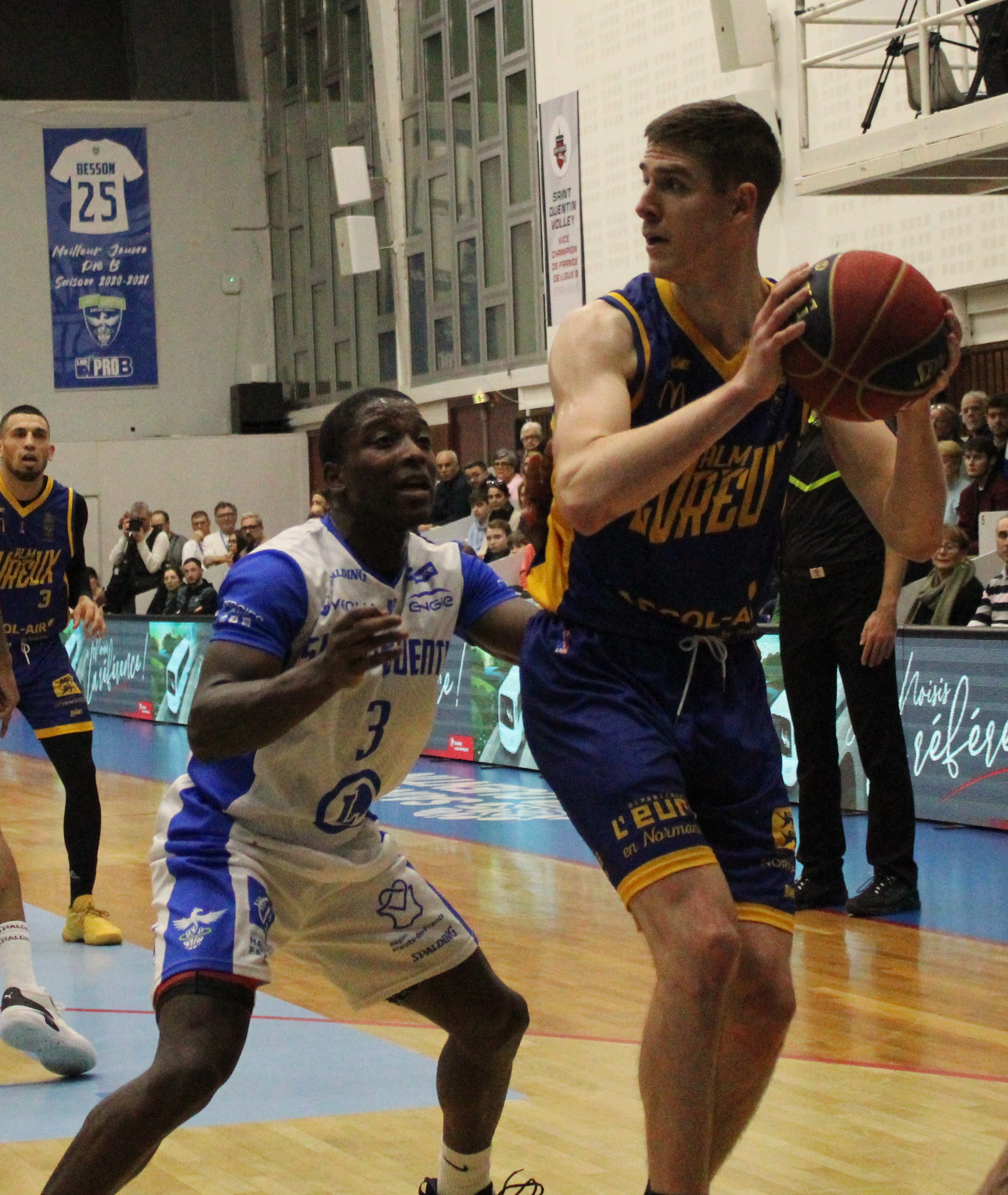
- Ašćerić (on the right) with ALM Évreux in 2022

No. 5 – Hyères-Toulon
- Position: Shooting guard
- League: Élite 2

Personal information
- Born: 10 January 1997 (age 29) Sankt Pölten, Austria
- Listed height: 2.01 m (6 ft 7 in)
- Listed weight: 91 kg (201 lb)

Career information
- NBA draft: 2019: undrafted
- Playing career: 2014–present

Career history
- 2014–2015: Arkadia Traiskirchen Lions
- 2015–2017: Lille
- 2017–2018: Hyères-Toulon
- 2018–2020: Mega Bemax
- 2020–2021: JL Bourg
- 2022–2023: ALM Évreux
- 2023–2025: Vojvodina
- 2025–2026: BC Vienna
- 2026–present: Hyères-Toulon

Luka Ašćerić (Serbian Cyrillic: Лука Ашћерић; born 10 January 1997) is a Serbian–Austrian professional basketball player for Hyères-Toulon of the French Élite 2.

== Professional career ==
Ašćerić played for the domestic team Arkadia Traiskirchen Lions during the 2014–15 season. In 2015, he moved to France where he played for Lille Métropole of the LNB Pro B for two seasons. He also played for French side Hyères-Toulon of the LNB Pro A during 2017–18 season.

In April 2018, Ašćerić signed for the Mega Bemax of the Basketball League of Serbia.

On 21 July 2020 Ašćerić signed with JL Bourg of LNB Pro A.

On 10 July 2021 Ašćerić signed with Śląsk Wrocław of the PLK. He missed the entire 2021–22 PLK season due to injury. In August 2022, he signed for French team ALM Évreux.

== National team career ==
In February 2020, Ašćerić was invited by coach Igor Kokoškov to join Serbian national basketball team for EuroBasket 2021 qualification games against Finland and Georgia.

== Personal life ==
His father Nedeljko Ašćerić is a professional basketball coach and former player. His father coached him during his stints with Lille Métropole.
