= 2021–22 KK Crvena zvezda season =

Club's season

Crvena zvezda mts
2021–22 season
- ABA League champions
- Serbian League champions
- Serbian Cup champions
- President: (Serbia) Nebojša Čović
- Head coach: (Montenegro) Dejan Radonjić
- Arena: Aleksandar Nikolić Hall; Štark Arena
- ABA League: 1st
- Playoffs: Champions
- Serbian League: Top seeded
- Playoffs: Champions
- EuroLeague: 11th
- Serbian Cup: Winner
- Highest home attendance: 7,893; 73–61 (Lithuania) Žalgiris (13 October 2021)
- Lowest home attendance: 852; 109–62 (Serbia) Borac (19 December 2021)
- Average home attendance: 3776 (Adriatic League); 6043 (Euroleague)
- Biggest win: +47; 109–62 (Serbia) Borac (19 December 2021)
- Biggest defeat: -28; 84–112 (Serbia) Partizan NIS (3 June 2022)
Home	Away
- All statistics correct as of June 6, 2022.

The 2021–22 KK Crvena zvezda season was the 77th season in the existence of the club. For the season it's referred to as KK Crvena zvezda mts for sponsorship reasons.

The club won three titles in the season (ABA League, Serbian League, and Serbian Cup), defending all three titles from the previous season.

== Overview ==
=== Pre-season ===
At the end of previous season, contracts expired with four players: Marko Jagodić-Kuridža, Jordan Loyd, Landry Nnoko and Duop Reath. All four of them left the club during the summer.

On 29 May 2021, Serbian guard Filip Čović, who spent last season on a loan at FMP, decided to retire at the age of 31. This marked the end of his second spell with Crvena zvezda. He was at the club from April 2018 until he was loaned out in February 2020, and during that time he won an Adriatic League title, two Serbian League titles, and an Adriatic League SuperCup.

On 31 May 2021, the Serbia men's national basketball team's head coach Igor Kokoškov announced 25-player preliminary roster for the 2020 FIBA Men's Olympic Qualifying Tournament in Belgrade selecting three Zvezda's players: Dejan Davidovac, Ognjen Dobrić, and Branko Lazić. Davidovac and Dobrić made into the final tournament roster, while Lazić withdrew due to health issues. Serbia finished as runners-up, losing to Italy in the final and not qualifying for the Olympics. Dobrić played all 4 games scoring 11.3 points per game, while Davidovac played 3 games with average of 2.3 points per game.

An American guard Jordan Loyd, who was the team's best scorer in the previous season's runs in Adriatic League and EuroLeague, was first to leave the club on 14 June 2021 after signing two years contract with Russian side Zenit Saint Petersburg. He left the club after only one season in which he contributed them to win titles in the Adriatic League, Serbian League, and Radivoj Korać Cup. Individually, he was once selected as a EuroLeague MVP of the Week, twice as an Adriatic League MVP of the Round, and was also member of the Adriatic League Ideal Starting Five of the season.

The first two signings of the season were Montenegrin international guard Nikola Ivanović and Serbian forward Luka Mitrović who already played for the club and was the Zvezda's captain during his first spell between 2012 and 2017. They both arrived from Montenegrin side and the club's ABA League rival Budućnost and signed two years contracts with the club on 18 June. Just few days later, on 24 June, Marko Jagodić-Kuridža who played for Crvena zvezda in last two seasons winning Adriatic League, Serbian League and Serbian Cup, went in the opposite direction and signed contract with Budućnost after his old contract with Crvena zvezda expired.

Third signing of the season was American forward Aaron White. He arrived from Greek side Panathinaikos after his contract expired and signed two years contract with the club. On 3 July 2021, club returned Serbian swingman Stefan Lazarević from a loan. He was loaned to the FMP since 2014. He's a product of a club's youth academy with which he won 2014 edition of Euroleague Basketball Next Generation Tournament.

On 3 July 2021, Crvena zvezda announced that they have signed the two-year contract extension with Ognjen Dobrić until summer of 2023. He has been playing at the club since summer of 2016, winning 10 trophies in the process.

On 12 July 2021, two more players left the club. American guard Langston Hall left for the Turkish side Bahçeşehir Koleji after early termination of his contract with Crvena zvezda. He played for the club for one season in which he contributed them to win titles in the Adriatic League, Serbian League, and Radivoj Korać Cup. Serbian guard Aleksa Radanov also left the club for the Bosnian side Igokea. He was part of Crvena zvezda squad since turning pro in 2015 with two loan spells at FMP during 2015–2018 and 2019–2020. During his spell at the club he won 3 Adriatic leagues, three Serbian leagues, an Adriatic Supercup and a Radivoj Korać Cup.

On 14 July 2021, Corey Walden, another American guard who played for the club in the last season, terminated his contract and signed new contract with German side Bayern Munich.

On 15 July 2021, Serbian international forward Nikola Kalinić returned to the club for his second spell. Previously he played for the Crvena zvezda during the 2014–2015 season. Highlights of his career were Euroleague title with Fenerbahçe in 2017 and silver medals with Serbia in 2014 World Cup and 2016 Summer Olympics. Kalinić arrived from Spanish side Valencia and signed two-year contract.

On 19 July 2021, Australian international big man Duop Reath left the club after his one-year contract expired. He returned to his home country and signed for Illawarra Hawks. Also, he was selected as a member of the Australia national team for the 2020 Summer Olympics in Tokyo, Japan.

On 10 August 2021, American point guard Nate Wolters returned to the club for his second spell. Previously he played for the Crvena zvezda during the 2016–2017 season. Wolters arrived from Russian side UNICS and signed one-year contract.

On 15 August 2021, Cameroonian center Landry Nnoko left the club after his one-year contract expired. He moved to the Spanish side Saski Baskonia.

On 16 August 2021, American guard Austin Hollins signed one-year contract with the club. He arrived from Russian club Zenit Saint Petersburg.

Reportedly, the club expressed their interest to sign guards Jerome Robinson, Stefan Marković, Stefan Jović, and centers Tarik Black, Greg Monroe, and Mathias Lessort among other free agents.

=== September ===
On 8 September 2021, forward Nikola Kalinić was elected as a vice president of the EuroLeague Players’ Association.

On 15 September 2021, German center Maik Zirbes returned to the club for the second time in his career. Previously he played for Emirati club Shabab Al Ahli. He was part of Crvena Zvezda squad in 2014–2016 and in 2018–2019. During that time he won 7 titles for the club; three Adriatic Leagues, two Serbian Leagues, an Adriatic Supercup and a Serbian Cup. Contract with him was signed until the end of 2021.

On 23 September 2021, Serbian power forward Nemanja Popović signed three-years long contract with the club. He's the product of the club's youth academy and spent previous two seasons playing for FMP. Together with him another player from the club's youth academy, Serbian guard Marko Gušić, was also promoted to the first squad.

Crvena zvezda opened their Adriatic League season on 24 September 2021 with a 97–61 home win over Split. This was the only game in September. In his first official game for Crvena zvezda, Nikola Ivanović won the MVP of the round honour after erupting for 20 points, 6 rebounds, 6 assists, 4 steals and a valuation of 35. It was the best debut performance in the recent club's history.

=== October ===
Crvena zvezda started their season in Euroleague on 1 October 2021 with an away game against Turkish side Fenerbahçe. Although club had limited squad of only 8 available players due to multiple injuries they managed to battle to a close defeat of 61–57. Crvena zvezda ended the month on 15th place with 2 wins and 5 defeats.

Crvena zvezda played 4 matches in Adriatic League during the October. They achieved 3 wins and 1 defeat, ending the month on the second position just behind their rivals Partizan NIS.

=== November ===
In Euroleague club opened the month with 2 home wins against Panathinaikos and ASVEL, followed by the 3 defeats against Baskonia, Real Madrid and UNICS. Club ended the month in the 13th position.

In Adriatic league club played 4 games and won them all, including the match against their rivals Partizan NIS. Month was ended at the top of the table.

On 8 November 2021, Serbian former international guard Stefan Marković signed two years contract with the Crvena zvezda. Previously he played for Italian club Virtus Bologna. Highlights of his career were silver medals with Serbia in EuroBasket 2009, 2014 World Cup and 2016 Summer Olympics.

=== December ===
On 20 December, the Euroleague Basketball sanctioned Crvena zvezda with a total of 48,000 Euro in fines for incidents that occurred on 14 and 16 December. The club was sanctioned with two fines (total of 11,000 euros) for conduct of a group of people committing acts that show a lack of respect and for the throwing of objects onto the court during the EuroLeague Round 15 home game against FC Barcelona on 14 December. Additionally, the club was sanctioned with two fines (total of 38,000 euros) for the aggression against a visiting team player, and for the throwing of objects onto the court during the EuroLeague Round 16 home game against FC Bayern Munich, two days later.

In Euroleague club played six games in which they achieved three wins and three losses. At the end of the month they were 13th in the league.

During this month Crvena Zvezda played 4 games in Adriatic league and won all of them thus extending their unbeaten record for this season to 10 games. Club finished this year at the top of the table.

Near the end of the month two first squad players were sent on loans. Marko Gušić was loaned to FMP on 28 December, and Aleksa Uskoković was loaned to Mega Mozzart on 30 December.

=== January ===
On 5 January, the Euroleague Basketball sanctioned Crvena zvezda with a 7,000 fine for the throwing of objects onto the court that occurred on the EuroLeague Round 18 home game against Zenit Saint Petersburg on 30 December 2021. On the same day, the club loaned out forward Nemanja Popović to Vojvodina for the rest of the 2021–22 season.

The EuroLeague Round 19 home game against Fenerbahçe Beko scheduled to be played on 6 January was suspended and postponed after several Crvena zvezda team members tested positive for COVID-19, which left the team without the minimum eight players fit to play. Also, the ABA League Round 15 road game against Budućnost VOLI scheduled to be played on 9 January was officially postponed due to COVID-19 outbreaks in both Budućnost and Crvena zvezda teams as well as ABA League Round 16 home game between Crvena zvezda and Igokea m:tel that was originally scheduled for 17 January. Furthermore, two more EuroLeague games were suspended and postponed; Round 20 home game against Real Madrid and Round 21 road game against Žalgiris.

Only two games were played in Euroleague during this month. Club had one win and one loss in them and ended the month in 14th position.

In Adriatic league club played three games and won all three of them. That extended club's winning record in this season to 13 games and won them second place in the league at the end of the month.

On 31 January, club extended contract with German center Maik Zirbes until the end of the season. In the same day draw was held for the quarterfinals of Radivoj Korać Cup that will be held in Niš during the February in which Crvena zvezda was drawn against Radnički Kragujevac.

=== February ===
Three games were played in the EuroLeague during this month. The club recorded two wins and a loss in those games, ending the month on the 13th place.

Furthermore, two games were played in the Adriatic League. Crvena zvezda won both of them, against Mega Mozzart and Zadar thus increasing their unbeaten run to 15 games in a row. This enabled them to overtake Partizan and secure top place by the end of the month.

On top of that, the 2022 Radivoj Korać Cup edition was held between 17 and 20 February. The club eliminated Radnički Kragujevac in a quarterfinal, Mega Mozzart in a semifinal and won their 11th national cup title by beating Partizan in the final. An American point guard Nate Wolters received the Radivoj Korać Cup MVP Award.

=== March ===
Five games were played in the EuroLeague during this month. The club recorded three wins and two losses in those games, ending the month in 9th place.

In the Adriatic League, the club played four games, winning three and losing the eternal derby against Partizan NIS. The club ended the month at the top of the league.

Nikola Topić, son of a former club's player and coach Milenko Topić, made his first senior appearance for the club on 28 March 2022 in an Adriatic League home game against Krka. At 16 years, seven months, and eighteen days of age, he became the youngest player in club's history to score points for Crvena zvezda in the regional league.

=== April ===
On 1 April, Nikola Topić made his EuroLeague debut in a 82–57 loss to Bayern Munich, becoming one of youngest players to ever play in the EuroLeague at 16 years and 253 days of age.

Club played last three games in this season's Euroleague regular season, losing two and winning one. With that they ended in 11th place, failing to qualify for the playoffs.

In Adriatic league club won their last four regular season games, clinching top seed for the playoffs and direct qualification for the semifinals in which they will play against Slovenian side Cedevita Olimpija. Nikola Kalinić was named both regular season MVP and member of Ideal Starting Five, while Branko Lazić received Best Defender award.

=== May ===
During the May, only playoff games in Adriatic League were played. Crvena zvezda first won semifinal series against Cedevita Olimpija 2–1, and started final series against Partizan NIS with two home game wins.

=== June ===
Club ended their Adriatic League season by defeating Partizan NIS in final series 3–2. This was club's sixth title in regional competition, tying the record with Partizan. Ognjen Dobrić was named Finals MVP.

Guard Nate Walters went to the U.S. upon the club's approval on personal matters and won't be in the roster for the upcoming Serbian League Playoffs.

On 13 June 2022, forward Filip Radaković officially signed a four-year professional contract, singing his first professional agreement. On 16 June, guard Luka Vudragović and forward Lazar Đoković officially signed their first professional agreements.

=== Injury reports ===
On 11 September 2021, forward Aaron White broke the left forearm after falling following a dunk during a preseason game against Panathinaikos OPAP. The following day the Zvezda announced that White will undergo surgery on Sunday in Munich and that usual recovery is about six weeks. The club canceled two preseason games in September 2021 due to multiple injury reports (Dejan Davidovac, Branko Lazić, Nate Wolters, Ognjen Dobrić, and Marko Simonović). By the end of September forwards White, Lazić, Davidovac and guard Dobrić remained on the injury list, while guards Stefan Lazarević, Wolters and Aleksa Uskoković have different schedule for trainings.

On 2 January 2022, forward Nikola Kalinić tested positive for the COVID-19. Two day later, 11 more players and staff members were tested positive for the COVID-19, including head coach Dejan Radonjić, his assistants Goran Bošković and Nikola Birač, and players Branko Lazić, Luka Mitrović, Austin Hollins, Nate Wolters, Ognjen Dobrić, Stefan Marković, Marko Simonović, and Maik Zirbes. Also, forward Dejan Davidovac was tested positive for the COVID-19 on 8 January.

== Players ==
=== Current roster ===
Note: Flags indicate national team eligibility at FIBA-sanctioned events. Players may hold other non-FIBA nationalities not displayed.

Crvena zvezda mts roster
Players
Coaches

Pos.	No.	Nat.	Name	Ht.	Wt.	Age
G/F	7	(Serbia)	Davidovac, Dejan	2.03 m (6 ft 8 in)	95 kg (209 lb)	27 – 17 January 1995
G/F	13	(Serbia)	Dobrić, Ognjen	2.00 m (6 ft 7 in)	93 kg (205 lb)	27 – 27 October 1994
F/C	5	(Serbia)	Gačić, Lazar	2.15 m (7 ft 1 in)		17 – 31 January 2005
SG	14	(United States)	Hollins, Austin	1.93 m (6 ft 4 in)	86 kg (190 lb)	30 – 8 November 1991
PG	20	(Montenegro)	Ivanović, Nikola	1.90 m (6 ft 3 in)	85 kg (187 lb)	28 – 19 February 1994
F	12	(Serbia)	Kalinić, Nikola	2.03 m (6 ft 8 in)	105 kg (231 lb)	30 – 8 November 1991
C	32	(Serbia)	Kuzmić, Ognjen	2.14 m (7 ft 0 in)	116 kg (256 lb)	32 – 16 May 1990
G/F	2	(Serbia)	Lazarević, Stefan	2.00 m (6 ft 7 in)	100 kg (220 lb)	25 – 20 August 1996
G/F	10	(Serbia)	Lazić, Branko (C)	1.95 m (6 ft 5 in)	91 kg (201 lb)	33 – 12 January 1989
G	27	(Serbia)	Marković, Stefan	1.97 m (6 ft 6 in)	98 kg (216 lb)	34 – 25 April 1988
G/F	21	(Serbia)	Matović, Ognjen	1.97 m (6 ft 6 in)		17 – 8 August 2004
PF	9	(Serbia)	Mitrović, Luka	2.06 m (6 ft 9 in)	107 kg (236 lb)	29 – 21 March 1993
F	19	(Serbia)	Simonović, Marko	2.03 m (6 ft 8 in)	95 kg (209 lb)	36 – 30 May 1986
G	44	(Serbia)	Topić, Nikola	1.98 m (6 ft 6 in)		16 – 10 August 2005
SG	6	(Serbia)	Vudragović, Luka	1.97 m (6 ft 6 in)		18 – 2 June 2004
C	15	(Serbia)	Vuković, Andrija	2.10 m (6 ft 11 in)		17 – 18 January 2005
F	30	(United States)	White, Aaron	2.06 m (6 ft 9 in)	104 kg (229 lb)	29 – 10 September 1992
PG	3	(United States)	Wolters, Nate	1.93 m (6 ft 4 in)	86 kg (190 lb)	31 – 15 May 1991
C	33	(Germany)	Zirbes, Maik	2.08 m (6 ft 10 in)	121 kg (267 lb)	32 – 29 January 1990

Head coach

- (Montenegro) Dejan Radonjić

Assistant coach(es)

- (Montenegro) Goran Bošković
- (Serbia) Nikola Birač
- (Serbia) Miodrag Dinić
- (Serbia) Saša Kosović

Strength & conditioning coach(es)

- (Serbia) Aleksandar Lukman

Team manager

- (Serbia) Nebojša Ilić

Legend

- (C) Team captain
- Injured

- Roster
- Transactions
Updated: February 16, 2022

=== Players with multiple nationalities ===
- (Serbia) (Bosnia and Herzegovina) Ognjen Kuzmić
- (Serbia) (Montenegro) Andrija Vuković

=== Depth chart ===
Pos.	Starting 5	Bench 1	Bench 2	Reserves	Youth system
C	Ognjen Kuzmić	Luka Mitrović		Maik Zirbes	Andrija Vuković
PF	Aaron White	Dejan Davidovac		Marko Simonović	Lazar Gačić
SF	Nikola Kalinić	Stefan Lazarević	Branko Lazić		Ognjen Matović
SG	Austin Hollins	Ognjen Dobrić			Luka Vudragović
PG	Nate Wolters	Stefan Marković	Nikola Ivanović		Nikola Topić

=== On loan ===
The following players have been on loan during the 2021–22 season.

KK Crvena zvezda players out on loan
Nat.	Player	Position	Team	On loan since
(Serbia)	Milutin Vujičić	PG	(Serbia) FMP	May 2021
(Serbia)	Arijan Lakić	PG/SG	(Bosnia and Herzegovina) Spars	September 2021
(Montenegro)	Filip Anđušić	PF/C	(Serbia) Slodes	September 2021
(Serbia)	Lazar Vasić	PG	(Serbia) Slodes	September 2021
(Serbia)	Filip Branković	C	(Serbia) Borac Zemun	September 2021
(Serbia)	Nikola Manojlović	SG/SF	(Serbia) FMP	December 2021
(Serbia)	Marko Gušić	SG/SF	(Serbia) FMP	December 2021
(Serbia)	Aleksa Uskoković	PG	(Serbia) Mega Mozzart	December 2021
(Serbia)	Nemanja Popović	PF	(Serbia) Vojvodina	January 2022

=== Transactions ===
==== Players In ====
No.	Pos.	Nat.	Name	Age	Moving from		Transfer fee	Date	Source
20	PG	(Montenegro)	Nikola Ivanović	27	Budućnost VOLI	(Montenegro)	End of contract	18 June 2021	
9	PF	(Serbia)	Luka Mitrović	28	Budućnost VOLI	(Montenegro)	End of contract	18 June 2021	
30	F	(United States)	Aaron White	28	Panathinaikos	(Greece)	End of contract	29 June 2021	
2	G/F	(Serbia)	Stefan Lazarević	24	FMP	(Serbia)	Loan return	3 July 2021	
12	F	(Serbia)	Nikola Kalinić	29	Valencia	(Spain)	End of Contract	15 July 2021	
3	PG	(United States)	Nate Wolters	30	UNICS	(Russia)	End of Contract	10 August 2021	
14	SG	(United States)	Austin Hollins	29	Zenit	(Russia)	End of Contract	17 August 2021	
33	C	(Germany)	Maik Zirbes	31	Shabab Al Ahli	(United Arab Emirates)	End of Contract	15 September 2021	
77	PF	(Serbia)	Nemanja Popović	19	FMP	(Serbia)	Parted ways	23 September 2021	
1	G/F	(Serbia)	Marko Gušić	19	Youth system		Promoted	23 September 2021	
27	G	(Serbia)	Stefan Marković	33	Virtus Bologna	(Italy)	Parted ways	8 November 2021	
44	PG	(Serbia)	Nikola Topić	16	Youth system		Promoted	28 March 2022	

==== Players Out ====
No.	Pos.	Nat.	Name	Age	Moving to		Type	Date	Source
–	PG	(Serbia)	Filip Čović	31	Retired		End of contract (Note: Čović was loaned to FMP in the 2020–21 ABA League season.)	29 May 2021	
3	SG	(United States)	Jordan Loyd	27	Zenit St Petersburg	(Russia)	End of contract	14 June 2021	
–	F/C	(Serbia)	Stefan Đorđević	22	Igokea	(Bosnia and Herzegovina)	End of contract (Note: Đorđević was loaned to FMP in the 2020–21 ABA League season.)	17 June 2021	
–	C	(Serbia)	Dušan Ristić	25	Urbas Fuenlabrada	(Spain)	End of contract (Note: Ristić was loaned to Avtodor Saratov in the 2020–21 season.)	18 June 2021	
21	PF	(Serbia)	Marko Jagodić-Kuridža	34	Budućnost VOLI	(Montenegro)	End of contract	24 June 2021	
1	PG	(United States)	Langston Hall	29	Bahçeşehir Koleji	(Turkey)	Contract termination	12 July 2021	
12	SG	(Serbia)	Aleksa Radanov	23	Igokea	(Bosnia and Herzegovina)	End of contract	12 July 2021	
2	SG	(United States)	Corey Walden	28	Bayern Munich	(Germany)	Transfer	14 July 2021	
11	PF	(Australia)	Duop Reath	25	Illawarra Hawks	(Australia)	End of contract	19 July 2021	
35	C	(Cameroon)	Landry Nnoko	27	Saski Baskonia	(Spain)	End of contract	15 August 2021	
–	F/C	(Serbia)	Nikola Jovanović	27	Nizhny Novgorod	(Russia)	End of contract (Note: Jovanović was loaned to Igokea in the 2020–21 ABA League season.)	14 September 2021	
1	G/F	(Serbia)	Marko Gušić	19	FMP	(Serbia)	Loan	28 December 2021	
4	PG	(Serbia)	Aleksa Uskoković	22	Mega Mozzart	(Serbia)	Loan	30 December 2021	
77	PF	(Serbia)	Nemanja Popović	20	Vojvodina	(Serbia)	Loan	5 January 2022	
–	SF	(Serbia)	Ranko Simović	22	FMP	(Serbia)	End of contract (Note: Simović was loaned to FMP in 2020–21 and 2021–22 seasons.)	29 May 2022	

== Club ==
=== Technical Staff ===
The following is the technical staff of Crvena zvezda for the 2021–22 season.

Position	Staff member
General Manager	(Serbia) Nemanja Vasiljević
Team Manager	(Serbia) Nebojša Ilić
Head Coach	(Montenegro) Dejan Radonjić
Assistant Coaches	(Montenegro) Goran Bošković
Assistant Coaches	(Serbia) Miodrag Dinić
Assistant Coaches	(Serbia) Nikola Birač
Assistant Coaches	(Serbia) (Bosnia and Herzegovina) Saša Kosović
Conditioning Coach	(Serbia) Aleksandar Lukman
Physiotherapist	(Serbia) Milorad Ćirić
Physicians	(Serbia) Nebojša Mitrović
Physicians	(Serbia) Boris Gluščević

=== Uniform ===
Crvena zvezda unveiled their new Adidas uniforms for the 2021–22 season on 15 September 2020, on the EuroLeague Media Day.

The following is a list of corporate sponsorship patches on a uniform of Crvena zvezda and uniform designs for the 2021–22 season.

- Supplier: Adidas
- Main sponsor: mts, Soccerbet
- Back sponsor: Idea (top)
- Shorts sponsor: None

Home	Away	Third

== Pre-season and friendlies ==
The first three games Crvena zvezda played in Belgrade against FMP, Mega Basket, and CSM Oradea. Later, the Zvezda competed with Bayern Munich, Panathinaikos, and Virtus Bologna at the Magenta SportCup in Munich from 11–12 September. They have won the MagentaSport Cup tournament following a 70–68 win over Bayern Munich in the final. At last, the club would have been played two games in Greece, against Promitheas Patras and AEK. Two days prior the trip to Greece, the club canceled last two games due to multiple injury reports. Instead of them club played two games in Belgrade against Mega Basket and Al Kuwait.

Win Loss Void

31 August 2021 1	Crvena zvezda mts (Serbia)	69–64	(Serbia) FMP	Belgrade
	Scoring by quarter: 20–15, 19–14, 13–17, 17–18
	Pts: White 23; Rebs: Davidovac 9 Asts: Davidovac, Kalinić 6 PIR: not available	Boxscore	Pts: Izundu 13; Rebs: Tasić 7 Asts: not available PIR: not available	Arena: Aleksandar Nikolić Hall; Attendance: not available Referees: not available

2 September 2021 2	Crvena zvezda mts (Serbia)	82–77	(Serbia) Mega Basket	Belgrade
	Scoring by quarter: 20–15, 20–18, 25–24, 17–20
	Pts: Hollins 20; Rebs: not available Asts: Ivanović 6 PIR: not available	Boxscore	Pts: Simanić 17; Rebs: not available Asts: Smith 10; PIR: not available	Arena: Aleksandar Nikolić Hall; Attendance: not available Referees: not available

7 September 2021 3	Crvena zvezda mts (Serbia)	74–50	(Romania) CSM Oradea	Belgrade
	Scoring by quarter: 19–20, 25–7, 18–11, 12–12
	Pts: Kuzmić 14; Rebs: Mitrović, Kalinić 9 Asts: Kalinić 7 PIR: not available	Boxscore	Pts: Green 11; Rebs: not available Asts: not available PIR: not available	Attendance: not available Referees: not available

11 September 2021 4 / Magenta SportCup SF	Crvena zvezda mts (Serbia)	83–55	(Greece) Panathinaikos OPAP	Munich
15:00	Scoring by quarter: 14–19, 18–16, 32–8, 19–12
	Pts: Kalinić 13; Rebs: Kuzmić 7 Asts: Kalinić 6 PIR: Kalinić 16	Boxscore	Pts: Kaselakis 13; Rebs: White, Mantzoukas 4 Asts: Bochoridis, Perry 3 PIR: Kaselakis 14	Arena: Audi Dome; Referees: not available

12 September 2021 5 / Magenta SportCup F	Bayern Munich (Germany)	68–70	(Serbia) Crvena zvezda mts	Munich
18:00	Scoring by quarter: 17–13, 20–11, 15–16, 16–30
	Pts: Rubit 16; Rebs: Rubit 8 Asts: Weiler-Babb 5 PIR: not available	Boxscore	Pts: Kalinić 14; Rebs: Mitrović 9 Asts: Kalinić, Mitrović 4 PIR: not available	Arena: Audi Dome; Attendance: not available Referees: not available

16 September 2021 –	Promitheas Patras (Greece)	Canceled	(Serbia) Crvena zvezda mts	Patras

18 September 2021 –	AEK (Greece)	Canceled	(Serbia) Crvena zvezda mts	Athens
				Arena: Ano Liosia Olympic Hall

18 September 2021 6	Mega Basket (Serbia)	74–73	(Serbia) Crvena zvezda mts	Belgrade
	Scoring by quarter: 18–20, 20–7, 13–29, 23–17
	Pts: Matković 18; Rebs: Matković 9 Asts: Smith 6 PIR: not available	Boxscore	Pts: Kalinić, Zirbes 13; Rebs: Zirbes 7 Asts: Mitrović 4 PIR: not available	Arena: Mega Factory Hall; Attendance: not available Referees: not available

20 September 2021 7	Crvena zvezda mts (Serbia)	98–69	Al Kuwait	Belgrade
	Scoring by quarter: 25–25, 18–27, 26–2, 29–15
	Pts: Ivanović 20; Rebs: not available Asts: not available PIR: not available	Boxscore	Pts: Kikanović 22; Rebs: not available Asts: not available PIR: not available	Attendance: not available Referees: not available

== Competitions ==
=== Overall ===
Competition	Started round	Final position / round	First match	Last match
Adriatic League	Matchday 1	Champions	24 September 2021	6 June 2022
EuroLeague	Matchday 1	11th	1 October 2021	8 April 2022
Serbian League	Semifinals 1	Champions	10 June 2022	19 June 2022
Radivoj Korać Cup	Quarterfinals	Winner	17 February 2022	20 February 2022

Updated to match played June 20, 2022
Source: Competitions

=== Overview ===
Competition	Record							
Competition	Pld	W	D	L	PF	PA	PD	Win %
Adriatic League	26	24	0	2	2,140	1,819	+321	92.31
Adriatic Playoffs	8	5	0	3	667	664	+3	62.50
Serbian Playoffs	5	4	0	1	453	351	+102	80.00
EuroLeague	33	14	0	19	2,427	2,484	−57	42.42
Radivoj Korać Cup	3	3	0	0	260	180	+80	100.00
Total	75	50	0	25	5,947	5,498	+449	66.67

Last updated: June 20, 2022
Source: Competitions

=== Adriatic League ===
==== Regular season ====
Pos	Team	Pld	W	L	PF	PA	PD	Pts	Qualification or relegation
1	(Serbia) Crvena zvezda mts	26	24	2	2140	1819	+321	50	Advance to the semifinals
2	(Serbia) Partizan NIS	26	22	4	2178	1840	+338	48	Advance to the semifinals
3	(Montenegro) Budućnost VOLI	26	19	7	2102	1902	+200	45	Advance to the preliminary round
4	(Slovenia) Cedevita Olimpija	26	18	8	2205	2056	+149	44	Advance to the preliminary round
5	(Bosnia and Herzegovina) Igokea m:tel	26	15	11	2053	1959	+94	41	Advance to the preliminary round

Source: ABA League

==== Results summary ====
Overall						Home					Away				
Pld	W	L	PF	PA	PD	W	L	PF	PA	PD	W	L	PF	PA	PD
26	24	2	2140	1819	+321	13	0	1111	876	+235	11	2	1029	943	+86

Last updated: April 25, 2022.
Source: Competitive matches

==== Results by round ====
Round	1	2	3	4	5	6	7	8	9	10	11	12	13	14	15	16	17	18	19	20	21	22	23	24	25	26
Ground	H	H	A	H	A	H	A	H	A	H	A	H	A	A	A	H	A	H	A	H	A	H	A	H	A	H
Result	W	W	L	W	W	W	W	W	W	W	W	W	W	W	W	W	W	W	W	W	L	W	W	W	W	W
Position	1	1	4	2	2	2	2	2	1	1	1	1	1	1	1	2	1	2	2	1	2	2	2	1	2	1

Last updated: April 25, 2022.
Source: Competitive matches
Ground: A = Away; H = Home; R = Rest. Result: L = Loss; W = Win; R = Rest; P = Postponed.

Win Loss

==== Matches ====
Note: All times are local CET (UTC+1) as listed by the ABA League. Some games were played behind closed doors (BCD) due to the COVID-19 pandemic in Europe.

24 September 2021 1	Crvena zvezda mts (Serbia)	97–61	(Croatia) Split	Belgrade
20:00	Scoring by quarter: 22–16, 31–12, 22–13, 22–20
	Pts: Ivanović 20; Rebs: Ivanović, Zirbes 6 Asts: Ivanović, Kalinić 6 PIR: Ivanović 35	Boxscore	Pts: Čampara 10; Rebs: Žganec 5 Asts: Runjić 4 PIR: Žganec 13	Arena: Aleksandar Nikolić Hall; Attendance: 2,476; Referees: Milan Nedović, Denis Hadžić, Stefan Ćalić

4 October 2021 2	Crvena zvezda mts (Serbia)	71–63	(Montenegro) Budućnost VOLI	Belgrade
21:00	Scoring by quarter: 19–14, 18–15, 8–18, 26–16
	Pts: Mitrović 19; Rebs: Mitrović 7 Asts: Wolters 7 PIR: Mitrović 21	Boxscore	Pts: Seeley 19; Rebs: Atić 10; Asts: Atić, Seeley 3 PIR: Seeley, Reed 18	Arena: Aleksandar Nikolić Hall; Attendance: 3,947; Referees: Damir Javor, Mario Majkić, Luka Kardum

10 October 2021 3	Igokea (Bosnia and Herzegovina)	75–68	(Serbia) Crvena zvezda mts	Laktaši
19:00	Scoring by quarter: 21–14, 23–8, 10–22, 21–24
	Pts: Waller 15; Rebs: Ilić, Stephens 5 Asts: Radanov 7 PIR: Radanov 25	Boxscore	Pts: Kalinić 16; Rebs: Mitrović, Wolters 6 Asts: Ivanović 7 PIR: Kalinić 18	Arena: Laktaši Sports Hall; Attendance: 800; Referees: Tomislav Hordov, Josip Radojković, Krunoslav Peić

17 October 2021 4	Crvena zvezda mts (Serbia)	79–64	(Slovenia) Cedevita Olimpija	Belgrade
21:00	Scoring by quarter: 17–24, 23–15, 16–16, 23–9
	Pts: Mitrović, Hollins 13; Rebs: Kalinić 12; Asts: three players 4 each PIR: Kuzmić 20	Boxscore	Pts: Blažič 16; Rebs: Murić 7 Asts: Rupnik 5 PIR: Rupnik 21	Arena: Aleksandar Nikolić Hall; Attendance: 4,345; Referees: Tomislav Hordov, Miloš Koljenšić, Igor Dragojević

24 October 2021 5	Mornar Barsko zlato (Montenegro)	69–77	(Serbia) Crvena zvezda mts	Bar
17:00	Scoring by quarter: 25–20, 13–23, 14–15, 17–19
	Pts: Lewis 16; Rebs: Mićović 7 Asts: three players 3 PIR: Lazić 14	Boxscore	Pts: Dobrić 22; Rebs: Kuzmić 13; Asts: Kalinić 4 PIR: Kuzmić 30	Arena: Topolica Sport Hall; Attendance: 1,000; Referees: Milan Nedović, Mario Majkić, Luka Kardum

1 November 2021 6	Crvena zvezda mts (Serbia)	81–67	(Serbia) Mega Mozzart	Belgrade
18:00	Scoring by quarter: 24–16, 22–16, 14–16, 21–19
	Pts: Wolters 13; Rebs: Mitrović 7 Asts: Wolters 6 PIR: Wolters 19	Boxscore	Pts: Balcerowski 19; Rebs: Jović 7 Asts: Kočović 6 PIR: Balcerowski 23	Arena: Aleksandar Nikolić Hall; Attendance: 2,342; Referees: Milan Nedović, Tomislav Vovk, Ernad Karović

7 November 2021 7	Zadar (Croatia)	73–83	(Serbia) Crvena zvezda mts	Zadar
18:45	Scoring by quarter: 18–18, 19–25, 15–25, 21–15
	Pts: Carter, Vuković 14; Rebs: three players 5 Asts: Mavra 7 PIR: Carter, Vuković 15	Boxscore	Pts: Wolters, Kuzmić 14; Rebs: Mitrović 6 Asts: Wolters 10; PIR: Wolters 23	Arena: Krešimir Ćosić Hall; Attendance: 500; Referees: Igor Dragojević, Marko Juras, Gordan Terlević

14 November 2021 8	Crvena zvezda mts (Serbia)	71–56	(Serbia) Partizan NIS	Belgrade
19:00	Scoring by quarter: 15–8, 17–13, 15–19, 24–16
	Pts: Mitrović 16; Rebs: Mitrović 7 Asts: Wolters, Kalinić 5 PIR: Mitrović 22	Boxscore	Pts: Smailagić 15; Rebs: Smailagić 9 Asts: four players 2 PIR: Smailagić 20	Arena: Aleksandar Nikolić Hall; Attendance: 7,187; Referees: Ilija Belošević, Milivoje Jovčić, Josip Radojković

22 November 2021 9	SC Derby (Montenegro)	67–99	(Serbia) Crvena zvezda mts	Podgorica
18:00	Scoring by quarter: 19–27, 21–22, 8–23, 19–27
	Pts: Tišma 13; Rebs: T. Ivišić 6 Asts: Vinales 5 PIR: Magee 11	Boxscore	Pts: Ivanović 14; Rebs: Kalinić 7 Asts: Marković 6 PIR: Ivanović 20	Arena: Morača Sports Center; Attendance: 1 Referees: Josip Radojković, Matej Špendl, Krunoslav Peić

6 December 2021 10	Crvena zvezda mts (Serbia)	86–72	(Croatia) Cibona	Belgrade
18:00	Scoring by quarter: 15–17, 25–14, 23–23, 23–18
	Pts: Ivanović, Kalinić 15; Rebs: Davidovac, Dobrić 4 Asts: Ivanović 6 PIR: Kalinić 22	Boxscore	Pts: Prkačin 16; Rebs: Gegić 7 Asts: Gnjidić 6 PIR: Prkačin 22	Arena: Aleksandar Nikolić Hall; Attendance: 1,295; Referees: Damir Javor, Sašo Petek, Dragan Porobić

11 December 2021 11	Krka (Slovenia)	70–71	(Serbia) Crvena zvezda mts	Novo Mesto
17:00	Scoring by quarter: 16–12, 19–15, 24–15, 11–29
	Pts: Stipčević 16; Rebs: Škedelj 6 Asts: Špan, Stipaničev 3 PIR: Gibbs 19	Boxscore	Pts: Davidovac 19; Rebs: Davidovac 10; Asts: Marković 4 PIR: Davidovac 34	Arena: Leon Štukelj Hall; Attendance: 800; Referees: Matej Boltauzer, Tomislav Hordov, Tomislav Stapić

19 December 2021 12	Crvena zvezda mts (Serbia)	109–62	(Serbia) Borac Čačak	Belgrade
18:00	Scoring by quarter: 28–13, 21–24, 37–15, 23–10
	Pts: Hollins 16; Rebs: Marković 6 Asts: Ivanović 6 PIR: White 22	Boxscore	Pts: Lešić 17; Rebs: Marinković 6 Asts: Sanadze, López 3 PIR: Lešić 15	Arena: Aleksandar Nikolić Hall; Attendance: 852; Referees: Milivoje Jovčić, Marko Pecelj, Vladimir Vesković

26 December 2021 13	FMP Meridian (Serbia)	74–98	(Serbia) Crvena zvezda mts	Belgrade
19:00	Scoring by quarter: 18–20, 19–24, 16–26, 21–28
	Pts: Jones 17; Rebs: Three players 4 Asts: Jones 7 PIR: Jones 21	Boxscore	Pts: Ivanović 18; Rebs: Three players 4 Asts: Ivanović 5 PIR: Ivanović 29	Arena: Železnik Hall; Attendance: 2,000; Referees: Igor Dragojević, Ivan Stefanović, Stefan Ćalić

2 January 2022 14	Split (Croatia)	62–66	(Serbia) Crvena zvezda mts	Split
19:00	Scoring by quarter: 9–16, 18–18, 15–15, 20–17
	Pts: Shorter 24; Rebs: Bajo 6 Asts: Ukić 6 PIR: Shorter 22	Boxscore	Pts: Ivanović 11; Rebs: Mitrović, White 7 Asts: Simonović 4 PIR: White 14	Arena: Arena Gripe; Attendance: 1,500; Referees: Sašo Petek, Bojan Kruljac, Dragan Porobić

24 January 2022 17	Cedevita Olimpija (Slovenia)	82–83	(Serbia) Crvena zvezda mts	Ljubljana
18:00	Scoring by quarter: 28–28, 15–15, 21–22, 18–18
	Pts: Blažič 21; Rebs: Blažič 11; Asts: Ferrell 7 PIR: Blažič 35	Boxscore	Pts: Hollins 18; Rebs: Mitrović 7 Asts: Wolters 5 PIR: Hollins 19	Arena: Arena Stožice; Attendance: 750; Referees: Tomislav Hordov, Igor Dragojević, Tomislav Stapić

30 January 2022 18	Crvena zvezda mts (Serbia)	81–74	(Montenegro) Mornar Barsko zlato	Belgrade
17:00	Scoring by quarter: 22–19, 19–19, 20–12, 20–24
	Pts: Davidovac 18; Rebs: Mitrović 8 Asts: Ivanović 8 PIR: Davidovac 24	Boxscore	Pts: Mihailović 26; Rebs: Smith 8 Asts: Gordić 7 PIR: Mihailović 24	Arena: Aleksandar Nikolić Hall; Attendance: 3,853; Referees: Saša Pukl, Tomislav Vovk, Krunoslav Peić

7 February 2022 19	Mega Mozzart (Serbia)	69–76	(Serbia) Crvena zvezda mts	Belgrade
15:30	Scoring by quarter: 25–20, 15–25, 12–18, 17–13
	Pts: Matković 20; Rebs: Simanić 8 Asts: Uskoković 5 PIR: Matković 22	Boxscore	Pts: Kuzmić 17; Rebs: Ivanović, Kuzmić 6 Asts: Kalinić 4 PIR: Kuzmić 21	Arena: Mega Factory Hall; Attendance: 600; Referees: Milivoje Jovčić, Denis Hadžić, Marko Mustapić

13 February 2022 20	Crvena zvezda mts (Serbia)	91–69	(Croatia) Zadar	Belgrade
19:00	Scoring by quarter: 26–22, 25–15, 19–16, 21–16
	Pts: Dobrić 23; Rebs: Ivanović 6 Asts: Marković 6 PIR: Dobrić 23	Boxscore	Pts: Jordano 16; Rebs: Vuković 7 Asts: Carter 4 PIR: Jordano 12	Arena: Aleksandar Nikolić Hall; Attendance: 2,341; Referees: Ilija Belošević, Matej Špendl, Edo Javor

6 March 2022 21	Partizan NIS (Serbia)	98–84	(Serbia) Crvena zvezda mts	Belgrade
18:30	Scoring by quarter: 28–21, 12–13, 24–29, 34–21
Arena Sport	Pts: Avramović 33; Rebs: Lessort 7 Asts: Avramović 6 PIR: Avramović 32	Boxscore	Pts: Davidovac, Hollins 17; Rebs: Davidovac 10; Asts: Kalinić 6 PIR: Davidovac 23	Arena: Aleksandar Nikolić Hall; Attendance: 6,884; Referees: Matej Boltauzer, Josip Radojković, Milan Nedović

14 March 2022 22	Crvena zvezda mts (Serbia)	94–84	(Montenegro) SC Derby	Belgrade
18:00	Scoring by quarter: 24–19, 28–24, 17–13, 25–28
	Pts: Kalinić 23; Rebs: Mitrović 9 Asts: Wolters 5 PIR: Kalinić, Mitrović 25	Boxscore	Pts: Kamenjaš 17; Rebs: Kamenjaš 7 Asts: Neal 6 PIR: Kamenjaš 26	Arena: Aleksandar Nikolić Hall; Attendance: 1,125; Referees: Uroš Nikolić, Krunoslav Peić, Gordan Terlević

21 March 2022 23	Cibona (Croatia)	74–78	(Serbia) Crvena zvezda mts	Zagreb
19:00	Scoring by quarter: 12–20, 20–18, 24–16, 18–24
	Pts: Gegić 19; Rebs: Gegić 7 Asts: Gegić 5 PIR: Gegić 24	Boxscore	Pts: Dobrić, Kalinić 14; Rebs: Mitrović 10; Asts: Marković 5 PIR: Mitrović 21	Arena: Dražen Petrović Basketball Hall; Attendance: 2,500; Referees: Uroš Obrknežević, Mario Majkić, Denis Hadžić

28 March 2022 24	Crvena zvezda mts (Serbia)	76–56	(Slovenia) Krka	Belgrade
18:00	Scoring by quarter: 18–15, 27–9, 19–14, 12–18
	Pts: Kuzmić, Wolters 9 Rebs: Kuzmić 11; Asts: Topić 5 PIR: Kuzmić 16	Boxscore	Pts: Stipčević 17; Rebs: Škedelj 8 Asts: Stipčević 3 PIR: Stipčević 22	Arena: Aleksandar Nikolić Hall; Attendance: 1,128; Referees: Tomislav Hordov, Igor Dragojević, Branimir Galić

11 April 2022 26	Crvena zvezda mts (Serbia)	90–82	(Serbia) FMP Meridian	Belgrade
18:00	Scoring by quarter: 21–25, 30–25, 24–12, 15–20
	Pts: Mitrović 17; Rebs: Mitrović 10; Asts: Marković 5 PIR: Mitrović 30	Boxscore	Pts: Izundu 23; Rebs: Izundu 9 Asts: Jones 7 PIR: Izundu, Jones 25	Arena: Aleksandar Nikolić Hall; Attendance: 1,023; Referees: Uroš Obrknežević, Aleksandar Milojević, Miloš Hadžić

16 April 2022 15 ^{N}	Budućnost VOLI (Montenegro)	76–80	(Serbia) Crvena zvezda mts	Podgorica
21:00	Scoring by quarter: 12:19, 24:27, 23:13, 17:21
	Pts: Seeley 18; Rebs: Jagodić-Kuridža 7 Asts: Cobbs 9 PIR: Seeley 17	Boxscore	Pts: Kalinić 18; Rebs: three players 5 Asts: White 6 PIR: Kalinić 25	Arena: Morača Sports Center; Attendance: 5,000; Referees: Uroš Nikolić, Miloš Koljenšić, Josip Radojković
Note: Originally scheduled for 9 January 2022. Postponed due to COVID-19 outbreaks in both teams. Rescheduled to 16 April 2022.

20 April 2022 25	Borac Čačak (Serbia)	54–66	(Serbia) Crvena zvezda mts	Čačak
19:00	Scoring by quarter: 13–15, 15–19, 14–10, 12–22
	Pts: Pecarski 14; Rebs: Marinković 8 Asts: Hale 3 PIR: Pecarski 19	Boxscore	Pts: Hollins 16; Rebs: Kuzmić 10; Asts: Ivanović 4 PIR: White 22	Arena: Borac Hall; Attendance: 2,000; Referees: Igor Dragojević, Marko Pecelj, Vladimir Vesković

23 April 2022 16 ^{N}	Crvena zvezda mts (Serbia)	85–66	(Bosnia and Herzegovina) Igokea m:tel	Belgrade
19:00	Scoring by quarter: 20–11, 23–22, 20–14, 22–19
	Pts: Kalinić 16; Rebs: Kalinić 5 Asts: Ivanović 5 PIR: Kalinić 20	Boxscore	Pts: Waller 16; Rebs: Ilić 11; Asts: Robinson 7 PIR: Ilić, Waller 17	Arena: Aleksandar Nikolić Hall; Attendance: 3,745; Referees: Milivoje Jovčić, Bojan Kruljac, Gordan Terlević
Note: Originally scheduled for 17 January 2022. Postponed due to COVID-19 outbreaks in Igokea. Rescheduled to 23 April 2022.

==== Playoffs ====
12 May 2022 Semifinals 1	Crvena zvezda mts (Serbia)	93–82 (Series: 1−0)	(Slovenia) Cedevita Olimpija	Belgrade
19:00	Scoring by quarter: 26–23, 27–25, 18–15, 22–19
	Pts: Mitrović 21; Rebs: Mitrović, Kuzmić 7 Asts: Kalinić 6 PIR: Mitrović 28	Boxscore	Pts: Blažič 20; Rebs: Omić 8 Asts: Blažič 5 PIR: Blažič 20	Arena: Aleksandar Nikolić Hall; Attendance: 6,076; Referees: Saša Pukl, Uroš Nikolić, Luka Kardum

16 May 2022 Semifinals 2	Cedevita Olimpija (Slovenia)	88–80(OT) (Series: 1−1)	(Serbia) Crvena zvezda mts	Ljubljana
18:30	Scoring by quarter: 24–29, 19–15, 16–10, 17–22, Overtime: 12–4
	Pts: Murić 21; Rebs: Omić 8 Asts: Dragić 6 PIR: Murić 27	Boxscore	Pts: Dobrić 15; Rebs: Mitrović 7 Asts: Nate Wolters, Hollins 4 PIR: Dobrić 17	Arena: Arena Stožice; Attendance: 9,000; Referees: Milivoje Jovčić, Milan Nedović, Igor Dragojević

23 May 2022 Semifinals 3	Crvena zvezda mts (Serbia)	88–78 (Series: 2–1)	(Slovenia) Cedevita Olimpija	Belgrade
19:00	Scoring by quarter: 24–13, 18–24, 25–17, 21–24
	Pts: Kalinić 15; Rebs: Kuzmić 10; Asts: Ivanović 6 PIR: Ivanović, Kuzmić 17	Boxscore	Pts: Ferrell 25; Rebs: four players 4 Asts: Ferrell 5 PIR: Ferrell 32	Arena: Aleksandar Nikolić Hall; Attendance: 6,478; Referees: Ilija Belošević, Miloš Koljenšić, Mario Majkić

27 May 2022 Finals 1	Crvena zvezda mts (Serbia)	90–76 (Series: 1–0)	(Serbia) Partizan NIS	Belgrade
20:00	Scoring by quarter: 19–23, 23–16, 24–19, 24–18
	Pts: Ivanović 18; Rebs: Davidovac 5 Asts: Kalinić, Ivanović 5 PIR: Ivanović 18	Boxscore	Pts: Punter 15; Rebs: Lessort 6 Asts: Avramović 4 PIR: Avramović 15	Arena: Aleksandar Nikolić Hall; Attendance: 6,886; Referees: Saša Pukl, Uroš Obrknežević, Josip Radojković

29 May 2022 Finals 2	Crvena zvezda mts (Serbia)	85–81 (Series: 2–0)	(Serbia) Partizan NIS	Belgrade
20:00	Scoring by quarter: 29–18, 18–22, 15–13, 23–28
	Pts: Kalinić 25; Rebs: Mitrović 6 Asts: Wolters 8 PIR: Kalinić 29	Boxscore	Pts: Avramović 21; Rebs: LeDay, Lessort 7 Asts: four players 4 PIR: Lessort 28	Arena: Aleksandar Nikolić Hall; Attendance: 7,238; Referees: Ilija Belošević, Igor Dragojević, Mario Majkić

1 June 2022 Finals 3	Partizan NIS (Serbia)	70–67 (Series: 2–1)	(Serbia) Crvena zvezda mts	Belgrade
20:30	Scoring by quarter: 21–17, 18–14, 8–23, 23–13
	Pts: Punter 22; Rebs: Punter 5 Asts: Punter 6 PIR: Punter 34	Boxscore	Pts: Dobrić 20; Rebs: Kuzmić, Mitrović 5 Asts: Marković 5 PIR: Dobrić 21	Arena: Aleksandar Nikolić Hall; Attendance: 7,226; Referees: Matej Boltauzer, Uroš Nikolić, Milan Nedović

3 June 2022 Finals 4	Partizan NIS (Serbia)	112–84 (Series: 2–2)	(Serbia) Crvena zvezda mts	Belgrade
18:30	Scoring by quarter: 35–27, 33–16, 20–20, 24–21
	Pts: Avramović 24; Rebs: Lessort 5 Asts: Avramović 6 PIR: Avramović 33	Boxscore	Pts: Hollins 19; Rebs: five players 3 Asts: Ivanović 4 PIR: Hollins 18	Arena: Aleksandar Nikolić Hall; Attendance: 3,922; Referees: Damir Javor, Sašo Petek, Luka Kardum

6 June 2022 Finals 5	Crvena zvezda mts (Serbia)	80–77 (Series: 3–2)	(Serbia) Partizan NIS	Belgrade
20:00	Scoring by quarter: 18–20, 15–17, 26–21, 21–19
	Pts: Davidovac 15; Rebs: Davidovac, Kalinić 6 Asts: Wolters 7 PIR: Davidovac 20	Boxscore	Pts: Punter 27; Rebs: Lessort 13; Asts: Avramović 4 PIR: Punter 21	Arena: Aleksandar Nikolić Hall; Attendance: 5,634; Referees: Saša Pukl, Tomislav Hordov, Miloš Koljenšić

=== EuroLeague ===
On 28 February 2022, the Euroleague Basketball suspended participation of three Russian teams following the Russian invasion of Ukraine. By the end of the regular season, five games with those teams were annulled, and removed from the standings.

==== Regular season ====
Pos	Team	Pld	W	L	PF	PA	PD
9	(Spanish Basketball Federation) Bitci Baskonia	28	12	16	2116	2186	−70
10	(German Basketball Federation) ALBA Berlin	28	12	16	2121	2239	−118
11	(Basketball Federation of Serbia) Crvena zvezda mts	28	12	16	2041	2089	−48
12	(Turkish Basketball Federation) Fenerbahçe Beko	28	10	18	2051	2099	−48
13	(Hellenic Basketball Federation) Panathinaikos OPAP	28	9	19	2089	2235	−146

Source: EuroLeague
Rules for classification: All points scored in extra period(s) were not counted in the standings, nor for any tie-break situation.

==== Results summary ====
Overall						Home					Away				
Pld	W	L	PF	PA	PD	W	L	PF	PA	PD	W	L	PF	PA	PD
33	14	19	2427	2484	−57	10	6	1207	1181	+26	4	13	1220	1303	−83

Last updated: April 8, 2022.
Source: Competitive matches

==== Results by round ====
Round	1	2	3	4	5	6	7	8	9	10	11	12	13	14	15	16	17	18	19	20	21	22	23	24	25	26	27	28	29	30	31	32	33	34
Ground	A	A	H	A	H	A	A	H	H	A	A	H	A	H	H	H	A	H	H	H	A	A	A	H	H	A	A	H	H	A	H	A	A	H
Result	L	W	W	L	L	L	L	W	W	L	L	L	W	W	L	W	L	L	W	W	L	L	W	L	L	W	L	W	W	L	R	L	L	W
Position	12	7	5	9	11	12	15	11	10	12	13	13	12	12	13	11	12	13	13	13	14	14	14	14	14	13	13	13	10	10	9	9	11	9

Last updated: April 8, 2022.
Source: Competitive matches
Ground: A = Away; H = Home; R = Rest. Result: L = Loss; W = Win; R = Rest; P = Postponed.

Win Loss

==== Matches ====
Note: All times are CET (UTC+1) as listed by EuroLeague. Some games were played behind closed doors (BCD) due to the COVID-19 pandemic in Europe.

1 October 2021 1	Fenerbahçe Beko (Turkey)	61–57	(Serbia) Crvena zvezda mts	Istanbul
19:45	Scoring by quarter: 18–15, 10–11, 17–11, 16–20
	Pts: Pierre 13; Rebs: Booker 9 Asts: Henry 6 PIR: Pierre 19	Boxscore	Pts: Ivanović 16; Rebs: Kalinić 9 Asts: Ivanović 6 PIR: Ivanović 20	Arena: Ülker Sports and Event Hall; Attendance: 1,892; Referees: Fernando Rocha, Elias Koromilas, Joseph Bissang

7 October 2021 2	Maccabi Playtika Tel Aviv (Israel)	63–75	(Serbia) Crvena zvezda mts	Tel Aviv
20:05	Scoring by quarter: 10–20, 17–15, 10–19, 26–21
	Pts: Wilbekin 18; Rebs: Nunnally 5 Asts: Wilbekin 4 PIR: Lessort 21	Boxscore	Pts: Kalinić 19; Rebs: Mitrović 11; Asts: Kalinić 5 PIR: Kalinić 22	Arena: Menora Mivtachim Arena; Attendance: 10,245; Referees: Matej Boltauzer, Michele Rossi, Ioannis Foufis

13 October 2021 3	Crvena zvezda mts (Serbia)	73–61	(Lithuania) Žalgiris	Belgrade
19:00	Scoring by quarter: 13–14, 16–13, 17–15, 27–19
	Pts: Kalinić 15; Rebs: Mitrović 7 Asts: Wolters 7 PIR: Kalinić 19	Boxscore	Pts: Nebo 14; Rebs: Nebo 10; Asts: Strēlnieks 4 PIR: Nebo 24	Arena: Štark Arena; Attendance: 7,893; Referees: Juan Carlos García, Emin Moğulkoç, Robert Vyklický

15 October 2021 4	CSKA Moscow (Russia)	78–76	(Serbia) Crvena zvezda mts	Moscow
19:00	Scoring by quarter: 17–21, 25–21, 15–15, 21–19
	Pts: Clyburn 18; Rebs: Bolomboy, Voigtmann 5 Asts: Shved 5 PIR: Shved 25	Boxscore	Pts: Wolters 16; Rebs: Kuzmić 7 Asts: three players 3 PIR: Kuzmić 22	Arena: Megasport Arena; Attendance: 2,573; Referees: Robert Lottermoser, Amit Balak, Aare Halliko

22 October 2021 5	Crvena zvezda mts (Serbia)	63–78	(Germany) ALBA Berlin	Belgrade
19:00	Scoring by quarter: 10–12, 15–26, 21–20, 17–20
	Pts: Kuzmić 16; Rebs: Mitrović 9 Asts: Wolters 5 PIR: Kuzmić 22	Boxscore	Pts: Lô 17; Rebs: Sikma 7 Asts: three players 3 each PIR: Lô, Blatt 19	Arena: Aleksandar Nikolić Hall; Attendance: 4,658; Referees: Miguel Ángel Pérez, Rain Peerandi, Sérgio Silva

26 October 2021 6	Monaco (France)	70–62	(Serbia) Crvena zvezda mts	Fontvieille
19:00	Scoring by quarter: 21–12, 20–24, 15–17, 14–9
	Pts: Diallo 19; Rebs: Motiejūnas 8 Asts: James 4 PIR: Diallo 28	Boxscore	Pts: Wolters 18; Rebs: Kuzmić 7 Asts: Wolters 5 PIR: Kalinić 19	Arena: Azur Arena Antibes; Attendance: 3,119; Referees: Saša Pukl, Emilio Pérez, Michele Rossi

28 October 2021 7	A|X Armani Exchange Milan (Italy)	79–62	(Serbia) Crvena zvezda mts	Milan
20:30	Scoring by quarter: 24–6, 19–21, 19–23, 17–12
	Pts: Shields 18; Rebs: Hines 9 Asts: Rodríguez 8 PIR: Shields 16	Boxscore	Pts: Mitrović 17; Rebs: Mitrović 7 Asts: Uskoković, Wolters 5 PIR: Mitrović 27	Arena: Mediolanum Forum; Attendance: 4,000; Referees: Damir Javor, Mehdi Difallah, Vassilis Pitsilkas

4 November 2021 8	Crvena zvezda mts (Serbia)	81–48	(Greece) Panathinaikos OPAP	Belgrade
19:00	Scoring by quarter: 21–8, 18–18, 18–10, 24–12
	Pts: Wolters 18; Rebs: Kuzmić 8 Asts: three players 3 each PIR: Kuzmić 18	Boxscore	Pts: Macon 15; Rebs: four players 3 each Asts: Papapetrou 3 PIR: Macon 13	Arena: Aleksandar Nikolić Hall; Attendance: 6,753; Referees: Luigi Lamonica; Leandro Lezcano; Jordi Aliaga

11 November 2021 9	Crvena zvezda mts (Serbia)	73–67	(France) LDLC ASVEL	Belgrade
19:00	Scoring by quarter: 18–9, 15–23, 17–13, 23–22
	Pts: Kalinić 22; Rebs: Kuzmić 9 Asts: Ivanović 5 PIR: Kalinić 27	Boxscore	Pts: Okobo 16; Rebs: Fall 10; Asts: Strazel 5 PIR: Jones 17	Arena: Aleksandar Nikolić Hall; Attendance: 6,894; Referees: Juan Carlos García, Oļegs Latiševs, Eduard Udyanskyy

16 November 2021 10	Bitci Baskonia (Spain)	93–74	(Serbia) Crvena zvezda mts	Vitoria-Gasteiz
20:30	Scoring by quarter: 25–22, 30–10, 13–21, 25–21
	Pts: Enoch 23; Rebs: Enoch 11; Asts: L. Peters, Fontecchio 7 PIR: Enoch 32	Boxscore	Pts: Ivanović 21; Rebs: Kuzmić 8 Asts: Ivanović 7 PIR: Ivanović 27	Arena: Buesa Arena; Attendance: 6,091; Referees: Matej Boltauzer, Emin Moğulkoç, Amit Balak

18 November 2021 11	Real Madrid (Spain)	79–67	(Serbia) Crvena zvezda mts	Madrid
20:45	Scoring by quarter: 16–13, 16–19, 25–14, 22–21
	Pts: Tavares 15; Rebs: Poirier 8 Asts: Fernández 6 PIR: Poirier, Tavares 23	Boxscore	Pts: Hollins 16; Rebs: Davidovac 9 Asts: Ivanović 5 PIR: Hollins 17	Arena: WiZink Center; Attendance: 5,825; Referees: Mehdi Difallah, Carmelo Paternicò, Elias Koromilas

26 November 2021 12	Crvena zvezda mts (Serbia)	78–98	(Russia) UNICS	Belgrade
19:00	Scoring by quarter: 16–26, 23–21, 18–29, 21–22
	Pts: Hollins 15; Rebs: Kuzmić 9 Asts: Wolters, Kalinić 4 PIR: Hollins 15	Boxscore	Pts: J. Brown 18; Rebs: three players 5 Asts: L. Brown 9 PIR: Hezonja 25	Arena: Aleksandar Nikolić Hall; Attendance: 5,286; Referees: Luigi Lamonica, Leandro Lezcano, Mario Majkić

3 December 2021 13	Zenit Saint Petersburg (Russia)	58–69	(Serbia) Crvena zvezda mts	Saint Petersburg
19:00	Scoring by quarter: 16–23, 12–19, 12–16, 18–11
	Pts: Mickey 16; Rebs: Zubkov 8 Asts: Loyd 5 PIR: Zubkov 23	Boxscore	Pts: Wolters 14; Rebs: three players 5 Asts: Kalinić 4 PIR: Wolters 14	Arena: Sibur Arena; Attendance: 2,467; Referees: Oļegs Latiševs, Piotr Pastusiak, Vassilis Pitsilkas

9 December 2021 14	Crvena zvezda mts (Serbia)	81–76	(Greece) Olympiacos	Belgrade
19:00	Scoring by quarter: 19–15, 17–23, 20–15, 25–23
	Pts: Kalinić 25; Rebs: Mitrović 8 Asts: Kalinić 6 PIR: Kalinić 27	Boxscore	Pts: Dorsey 18; Rebs: Martin 6 Asts: Sloukas 4 PIR: Dorsey 17	Arena: Aleksandar Nikolić Hall; Attendance: 4,336; Referees: Juan Carlos García, Emin Moğulkoç, Hugues Thépénier

14 December 2021 15	Crvena zvezda mts (Serbia)	69–76	(Spain) Barcelona	Belgrade
19:00	Scoring by quarter: 13–20, 18–14, 18–27, 20–15
	Pts: Kalinić, Mitrović 15; Rebs: Kuzmić 14; Asts: Davidovac 2 PIR: Davidovac 15	Boxscore	Pts: Hayes 14; Rebs: Hayes 8 Asts: Jokubaitis, Laprovíttola 5 PIR: Hayes 23	Arena: Aleksandar Nikolić Hall; Attendance: 6,849; Referees: Carmelo Paternicò, Gytis Vilius, Elias Koromilas

17 December 2021 16	Crvena zvezda mts (Serbia)	81–78	(Germany) Bayern Munich	Belgrade
20:45	Scoring by quarter: 20–21, 26–24, 19–22, 16–11
	Pts: Kalinić 20; Rebs: Kalinić 7 Asts: Mitrović 8 PIR: Kalinić 24	Boxscore	Pts: Lučić 21; Rebs: Hunter 10; Asts: Weiler-Babb 5 PIR: Lučić 25	Arena: Aleksandar Nikolić Hall; Attendance: 6,894; Referees: Miguel Ángel Pérez, Mehdi Difallah, Amit Balak

22 December 2021 17	Anadolu Efes (Turkey)	84–83	(Serbia) Crvena zvezda mts	Istanbul
18:30	Scoring by quarter: 31–21, 12–25, 22–22, 19–15
	Pts: Pleiß 23; Rebs: Pleiß 7 Asts: Larkin 9 PIR: Pleiß 27	Boxscore	Pts: Kalinić 20; Rebs: Kuzmić 11; Asts: Wolters, Kalinić 5 PIR: Kuzmić, Kalinić 17	Arena: Sinan Erdem Dome; Attendance: 8,674; Referees: Robert Lottermoser, Emilio Pérez, Guido Giovannetti

30 December 2021 18	Crvena zvezda mts (Serbia)	76–80(OT)	(Russia) Zenit Saint Petersburg	Belgrade
19:00	Scoring by quarter: 21–29, 21–15, 15–6, 12–19, Overtime: 7–11
	Pts: Wolters 21; Rebs: Kalinić 6 Asts: Wolters 6 PIR: Wolters 22	Boxscore	Pts: Baron 25; Rebs: Poythress 10; Asts: Baron 6 PIR: Baron 30	Arena: Aleksandar Nikolić Hall; Attendance: 6,956; Referees: Oļegs Latiševs, Piotr Pastusiak, Robert Vyklický

21 January 2022 22	LDLC ASVEL (France)	69–67	(Serbia) Crvena zvezda mts	Villeurbanne
21:00	Scoring by quarter: 11–17, 14–18, 24–13, 20–19
	Pts: Lacombe, Jones 17; Rebs: Lacombe, Kahudi 7 Asts: Jones 5 PIR: Jones 22	Boxscore	Pts: Dobrić 20; Rebs: Mitrović 7 Asts: Wolters 5 PIR: Mitrović 16	Arena: Astroballe; Attendance: 2,000; Referees: Luigi Lamonica, Emilio Pérez, Vasiliki Tsaroucha

27 January 2022 23	Olympiacos (Greece)	72–76	(Serbia) Crvena zvezda mts	Piraeus
20:00	Scoring by quarter: 21–22, 15–15, 16–19, 20–20
	Pts: Vezenkov 20; Rebs: Vezenkov 8 Asts: Walkup 5 PIR: Vezenkov 24	Boxscore1; Boxscore2	Pts: Dobrić 14; Rebs: White 8 Asts: Dobrić, Kalinić 4 PIR: Dobrić 18	Arena: Peace and Friendship Stadium; Attendance: 1,000; Referees: Daniel Hierrezuelo, Amit Balak, Sérgio Silva

1 February 2022 24	Crvena zvezda mts (Serbia)	57–63	(Italy) A|X Armani Exchange Milan	Belgrade
	Scoring by quarter: 8–7, 15–19, 21–24, 13–13
	Pts: Hollins, Kalinić 13; Rebs: Davidovac 6 Asts: Kalinić 4 PIR: Kalinić 17	Boxscore1; Boxscore2	Pts: Delaney 18; Rebs: Bentil 9 Asts: Rodríguez 4 PIR: Delaney 19	Arena: Aleksandar Nikolić Hall; Attendance: 5,638; Referees: Oļegs Latiševs, Emin Moğulkoç, Carlos Cortés

3 February 2022 25	Crvena zvezda mts (Serbia)	80–91	(France) Monaco	Belgrade
19:00	Scoring by quarter: 30–19, 22–23, 12–22, 16–27
	Pts: Hollins 19; Rebs: Kuzmić 5 Asts: Wolters 5 PIR: Ivanović 24	Boxscore1; Boxscore2	Pts: Motiejūnas 20; Rebs: Diallo 7 Asts: James 6 PIR: Motiejūnas 20	Arena: Aleksandar Nikolić Hall; Attendance: 4,247; Referees: Carmelo Paternicò, Leandro Lezcano, Gentian Cici

11 February 2022 26	UNICS (Russia)	77–84	(Serbia) Crvena zvezda mts	Kazan
17:00	Scoring by quarter: 11–22, 32–21, 22–20, 12–21
	Pts: Hezonja 18; Rebs: Hezonja 9 Asts: Spissu 6 PIR: Hezonja 21	Boxscore	Pts: Kalinić 20; Rebs: White 6 Asts: Kalinić, Marković 6 PIR: Kalinić 22	Arena: Basket-Hall Kazan; Attendance: 3,523; Referees: Benjamín Jiménez, Mehdi Difallah, Jurgis Laurinavičius

25 February 2022 27	Panathinaikos OPAP (Greece)	79–73	(Serbia) Crvena zvezda mts	Athens
20:00	Scoring by quarter: 17–23, 25–18, 17–18, 20–14
	Pts: Nedović 25; Rebs: Evans 9 Asts: Macon, Nedović 5 PIR: Nedović 25	Boxscore	Pts: White 14; Rebs: White 12; Asts: Kalinić 6 PIR: White 27	Arena: OAKA Altion; Attendance: 1,850; Referees: Daniel Hierrezuelo, Anne Panther, Seffi Shemmesh

27 February 2022 19 ^{N}	Crvena zvezda mts (Serbia)	74–69	(Turkey) Fenerbahçe Beko	Belgrade
21:00	Scoring by quarter: 20–18, 21–19, 18–23, 15–9
	Pts: Kalinić 11; Rebs: Davidovac, Mitrović 6 Asts: Ivanović 4 PIR: Davidovac 16	Boxscore	Pts: Barthel 15; Rebs: Booker 7 Asts: de Colo 6 PIR: Pierre 17	Arena: Aleksandar Nikolić Hall; Attendance: 6,472; Referees: Miguel Angel Pérez, Michele Rossi, Jakub Zamojski
Note: Originally scheduled for 6 January 2022. Postponed after several Crvena zvezda members tested positive for COVID-19. Rescheduled to 27 February 2022.

3 March 2022 28	Crvena zvezda mts (Serbia)	86–83	(Spain) Bitci Baskonia	Belgrade
19:00	Scoring by quarter: 13–26, 28–15, 14–15, 31–27
	Pts: Mitrović 18; Rebs: White 6 Asts: three players 4 PIR: Mitrović 24	Boxscore	Pts: Fontecchio 19; Rebs: Fontecchio 8 Asts: Granger 7 PIR: Costello, Granger 22	Arena: Aleksandar Nikolić Hall; Attendance: 4,879; Referees: Luigi Lamonica, Ioannis Foufis, Robert Vyklicky

8 March 2022 20 ^{N}	Crvena zvezda mts (Serbia)	65–62	(Spain) Real Madrid	Belgrade
19:00	Scoring by quarter: 16–15, 19–13, 8–14, 22–20
	Pts: Davidovac, Ivanović 13; Rebs: Kalinić 5 Asts: Hollins, Wolters 2 PIR: Davidovac 13	Boxscore	Pts: Lull 20; Rebs: Tavares 11; Asts: Hanga, Heurtel 5 PIR: Tavares 19	Arena: Aleksandar Nikolić Hall; Attendance: 5,893; Referees: Mehdi Difallah, Elias Koromilas, Arturas Sukys
Note: Originally scheduled for 11 January 2022. Postponed after several Crvena zvezda members tested positive for COVID-19. Rescheduled to 8 March 2022.

10 March 2022 29	Crvena zvezda mts (Serbia)	84–77	(Israel) Maccabi Playtika Tel Aviv	Belgrade
19:00	Scoring by quarter: 24–10, 18–29, 23–21, 19–17
	Pts: Kalinić 15; Rebs: Kuzmić 8 Asts: Kalinić 5 PIR: Kalinić 22	Boxscore	Pts: Nunnally 24; Rebs: Žižić 6 Asts: Nunnally, Wilbekin 4 PIR: Nunnally 31	Arena: Aleksandar Nikolić Hall; Attendance: 7,000; Referees: Borys Ryzhyk, Emilio Perez, Rain Peerandi

18 March 2022 30	Barcelona (Spain)	82–70	(Serbia) Crvena zvezda mts	Barcelona
21:00	Scoring by quarter: 22–15, 25–17, 18–19, 17–19
	Pts: Mirotić 19; Rebs: Davies 6 Asts: Calathes 7 PIR: Davies, Mirotić 20	Boxscore	Pts: Dobrić 17; Rebs: Mitrović 6 Asts: Wolters 4 PIR: Dobrić 16	Arena: Palau Blaugrana; Referees: Oļegs Latiševs, Joseph Bissang, Tomasz Trawicki

23 March 2022 31 ^{N}	Crvena zvezda mts (Serbia)	Suspended	(Russia) CSKA Moscow	Belgrade
19:00
		Boxscore		Arena: Aleksandar Nikolić Hall
Note: On 28 February 2022, the Euroleague Basketball suspended participation of Russian teams following the Russian invasion of Ukraine.

25 March 2022 32	ALBA Berlin (Germany)	74–70	(Serbia) Crvena zvezda mts	Berlin
20:00	Scoring by quarter: 24–15, 13–20, 21–22, 16–13
	Pts: Lô 22; Rebs: Sikma 9 Asts: Lô 4 PIR: Lô, Sikma 23	Boxscore	Pts: Wolters 18; Rebs: three players 4 Asts: Marković, Wolters 5 PIR: Wolters 20	Arena: Mercedes-Benz Arena; Referees: Luigi Lamonica, Mehdi Difallah, Aare Halliko

1 April 2022 33	Bayern Munich (Germany)	82–57	(Serbia) Crvena zvezda mts	Munich
20:30	Scoring by quarter: 15−18, 27−15, 21−10, 19−14
	Pts: Rubit 22; Rebs: Hunter 7 Asts: Lučić 5 PIR: Rubit 25	Boxscore	Pts: Kalinić 12; Rebs: three players 5 Asts: Wolters, Davidovac 3 PIR: Kalinić 15	Arena: Audi Dome; Attendance: 6,041; Referees: Borys Ryzhyk, Seffi Shemmesh, Jurgis Laurinavičius

3 April 2022 21 ^{N}	Žalgiris (Lithuania)	103–98(OT)	(Serbia) Crvena zvezda mts	Kaunas
18:00	Scoring by quarter: 23–14, 22–18, 15–35, 28–21, Overtime: 15–10
	Pts: Ulanovas 18; Rebs: Jankūnas, Ulanovas 7 Asts: Lekavičius 7 PIR: Lekavičius 26	Boxscore	Pts: Dobrić 21; Rebs: Kalinić 7 Asts: Wolters 7 PIR: Dobrić 23	Arena: Žalgirio Arena; Attendance: 9,000; Referees: Sreten Radović, Hugues Thepenier, Marcin Kowalski
Note: Originally scheduled for 13 January 2022. Postponed after several Crvena zvezda members tested positive for COVID-19. Rescheduled to 3 April 2022.

8 April 2022 34	Crvena zvezda mts (Serbia)	93–85	(Turkey) Anadolu Efes	Belgrade
21:00	Scoring by quarter: 21–29, 19–11, 25–22, 28–23
	Pts: Kalinić 16; Rebs: Kalinić 10; Asts: Kalinić 8 PIR: Kalinić 25	Boxscore	Pts: Larkin 16; Rebs: Singleton 8 Asts: Simon 8 PIR: Larkin 27	Arena: Aleksandar Nikolić Hall; Attendance: 5,734; Referees: Robert Lottermoser, Fernando Rocha, Arturas Sukys

=== Serbian League ===
The 2021–22 Basketball League of Serbia will be the 16th season of the Serbian highest professional basketball league. Crvena Zvezda is the 6-time defending champion.

Win Loss

10 June 2022 Semifinals 1	Crvena zvezda mts	114–78	Mega Mozzart	Belgrade
20:00	Scoring by quarter: 33–15, 25–24, 31–17, 25–22
Arena Sport	Pts: Ivanović 25; Rebs: Dobrić 7 Asts: Marković 11; PIR: Ivanović 32	Boxscore	Pts: Ruzhentsev 16; Rebs: Ruzhentsev, Grbović 6 Asts: Uskoković 10; PIR: Uskoković 18	Arena: Aleksandar Nikolić Hall; Attendance: 4,236; Referees: Uroš Obrknežević, Marko Juras, Siniša Prpa

12 June 2022 Semifinals 2	Mega Mozzart	77–70	Crvena zvezda mts	Belgrade
12:00	Scoring by quarter: 12–22, 14–16, 28–15, 23–17
Arena Sport	Pts: Ruzhentsev 23; Rebs: Rudan 18; Asts: Uskoković 5 PIR: Rudan 32	Boxscore	Pts: Mitrović 16; Rebs: Mitrović 9 Asts: Ivanović 8 PIR: Mitrović 17	Arena: Mega Factory; Attendance: 326; Referees: Uroš Nikolić, Marko Pecelj, Stefan Ćalić

14 June 2022 Semifinals 3	Crvena zvezda mts	88–66 (Series: 2–1)	Mega Mozzart	Belgrade
18:30	Scoring by quarter: 26–16, 27–17, 15–12, 20–21
Arena Sport	Pts: Kalinić 21; Rebs: Mitrović 7 Asts: Marković 8 PIR: Kalinić 26	Boxscore	Pts: Ruzhentsev, Simanić 12; Rebs: three players 6 Asts: Uskoković 8 PIR: Simanić 20	Arena: Aleksandar Nikolić Hall; Attendance: 4,023; Referees: Aleksandar Glišić, Vladimir Jevtović, Radoš Arsenijević

17 June 2022 Finals 1	Crvena zvezda mts	110–71	FMP Meridian	Belgrade
19:00	Scoring by quarter: 27–18, 29–11, 26–23, 31–19
	Pts: Kuzmić 17; Rebs: Kuzmić 7 Asts: Ivanović 9 PIR: Ivanović 27	Boxscore	Pts: Tasić 19; Rebs: Tasić 7 Asts: Tasić 4 PIR: Tasić 28	Arena: Aleksandar Nikolić Hall; Attendance: 3,978; Referees: Uroš Obrknežević, Uroš Nikolić, Ivan Stefanović

19 June 2022 Finals 2	FMP Meridian	59–71 (Series: 0–2)	Crvena zvezda mts	Belgrade
20:00	Scoring by quarter: 9–15, 22–19, 14–25, 14–12
	Pts: Radonjić 14; Rebs: Tasić, Izundu 6 Asts: Radonjić 6 PIR: Radonjić 16	Boxscore	Pts: Ivanović 21; Rebs: Ivanović 6 Asts: Kalinić, Ivanović 5 PIR: Ivanović 31	Arena: Železnik Hall; Attendance: 3,212; Referees: Aleksandar Glišić, Vladimir Jevtović, Nemanja Ninković

=== Radivoj Korać Cup ===
The 2022 Radivoj Korać Cup is the 20th season of the Serbian men's national basketball cup tournament. The Zvezda is the defending champion.

Win Loss

17 February 2022 Quarterfinals	Crvena zvezda mts	103–59	Radnički Kragujevac	Niš
18:00	Scoring by quarter: 28–13, 29–11, 24–22, 22–13
	Pts: Marković 16; Rebs: Kuzmić, White 6 Asts: Ivanović 6 PIR: Ivanović 26	Boxscore	Pts: Katić 17; Rebs: L. Stanković 8 Asts: Katić 5 PIR: Katić 22	Arena: Čair Sports Center; Attendance: 500; Referees: Milivoje Jovčić, Nemanja Ninković, Petar Pešić

19 February 2022 Semifinals	Crvena zvezda mts	72–53	Mega Mozzart	Niš
17:00	Scoring by quarter: 15–21, 24–12, 17–14, 16–6
	Pts: Kalinić 15; Rebs: Kuzmić 7 Asts: Wolters 5 PIR: Kuzmić 18	Boxscore	Pts: Matković 15; Rebs: Cerovina 6 Asts: Smith 7 PIR: Matković, Smith 12	Arena: Čair Sports Center; Attendance: 3,500; Referees: Milivoje Jovčić, Aleksandar Glišić, Ivan Stefanović

20 February 2022 Final	Crvena zvezda mts	85–68	Partizan NIS	Niš
21:00	Scoring by quarter: 20–13, 29–15, 18–18, 18–22
	Pts: Kalinić 18; Rebs: Kuzmić 7 Asts: Hollins 5 PIR: Hollins, Wolters 18	Boxscore	Pts: Lessort 19; Rebs: Lessort, Leday 4 Asts: Moore 5 PIR: Lessort 22	Arena: Čair Sports Center; Attendance: 5,000; Referees: Milivoje Jovčić, Uroš Obrknežević, Aleksandar Glišić

== Individual awards ==
=== ABA League ===
MVP of the Round
Round	Player	PIR
1	(Montenegro) Nikola Ivanović	35
13	(Montenegro) Nikola Ivanović	29
SF1	(Serbia) Luka Mitrović	28
F1	(Montenegro) Nikola Ivanović	18
F2	(Serbia) Nikola Kalinić	29
F5	(Serbia) Dejan Davidovac	20

Regular Season MVP
Position	Player	Ref.
SF	(Serbia) Nikola Kalinić	

Finals MVP
Position	Player	Ref.
G	(Serbia) Ognjen Dobrić	

Ideal Starting Five
Position	Player	Ref.
SF	(Serbia) Nikola Kalinić	

Best Defender
Position	Player	Ref.
G/F	(Serbia) Branko Lazić	

=== Radivoj Korać Cup ===
MVP Award
Position	Player	Source
PG	(United States) Nate Wolters	

=== Serbian Super League ===
Finals MVP Award
Position	Player	Source
PG	(Montenegro) Nikola Ivanović	

== Statistics ==
Legend
GP	Games played	GS	Games started	MPG	Minutes per game
FG%	Field-goal percentage	3FG%	3-point field-goal percentage	FT%	Free-throw percentage
RPG	Rebounds per game	APG	Assists per game	SPG	Steals per game
BPG	Blocks per game	PPG	Points per game	PIR	PIR per game

Player	Left during season

=== Adriatic League ===
Player	GP	GS	MPG	2FG%	3FG%	FT%	RPG	APG	SPG	BPG	PPG	PIR
Dejan Davidovac	30	10	17:00	.631	.337	.854	3.2	0.9	0.9	0.2	6.9	8.9
Ognjen Dobrić	29	9	22:00	.495	.416	.746	2.9	1.5	1.1	0.1	10.7	10.4
Austin Hollins	30	24	20:00	.589	.346	.743	2.3	1.0	1.5	0.2	9.1	6.8
Nikola Ivanović	31	2	17:00	.483	.321	.861	1.9	3.6	1.0	0.0	8.9	11.4
Nikola Kalinić	31	26	26:00	.474	.415	.736	3.5	3.3	0.9	0.1	11.4	12.3
Ognjen Kuzmić	32	28	16:00	.640	.000	.653	4.6	0.6	0.3	0.5	6.0	9.1
Stefan Lazarević	29	11	13:00	.541	.276	.900	2.0	0.7	0.5	0.0	3.7	3.5
Branko Lazić	23	5	17:00	.471	.380	.769	1.9	0.7	0.7	0.0	5.8	4.7
Stefan Marković	24	4	13:00	.391	.300	.783	1.7	2.8	0.8	0.0	3.4	5.7
Luka Mitrović	34	5	17:00	.601	.500	.761	4.5	1.4	0.7	0.2	8.5	10.9
Marko Simonović	19	0	12:00	.500	.362	.571	1.6	0.7	0.4	0.0	4.1	3.2
Nikola Topić	2	1	11:00	.333	.000	1.000	1.0	3.0	1.5	0.0	2.0	–1.0
Aaron White	21	14	16:00	.615	.291	.783	3.1	1.5	0.5	0.2	7.0	9.3
Nate Wolters	34	28	18:00	.573	.357	.550	2.4	3.5	0.6	0.0	8.4	9.3
Maik Zirbes	11	3	10:00	.545	.000	.857	2.5	0.6	0.4	0.4	4.9	5.9
Marko Gušić	2	0	8:00	.250	.000	.000	1.0	0.5	1.0	0.0	1.0	1.5
Nemanja Popović	1	0	10:00	.333	.000	.500	1.0	1.0	0.0	1.0	3.0	0.0
Aleksa Uskoković	5	0	11:00	.455	.250	.500	1.0	1.0	0.0	0.2	3.0	1.6

Last updated: June 6, 2022.
Source: Adriatic League

=== Serbian League Playoffs ===
Player	GP	GS	MPG	2FG%	3FG%	FT%	RPG	APG	SPG	BPG	PPG	PIR
Dejan Davidovac	5	0	12:03	.625	.000	.000	1.6	1.4	0.4	0.4	2.0	2.8
Ognjen Dobrić	3	0	22:09	.385	.647	1.00	3.0	1.7	1.3	0.3	15.0	15.0
Lazar Gačić	Did not play											
Austin Hollins	4	4	19:57	.308	.387	1.00	2.3	1.8	1.0	0.3	11.5	7.8
Nikola Ivanović	5	0	23:05	.583	.417	.647	3.2	6.8	1.8	0.0	15.0	21.6
Nikola Kalinić	3	3	18:58	.667	.444	.900	2.3	4.3	1.3	0.3	12.3	18.0
Ognjen Kuzmić	5	4	13:26	.654	.000	.571	3.8	0.4	0.2	0.2	7.6	8.6
Stefan Lazarević	5	1	19:16	.909	1.00	.500	2.8	0.2	2.2	0.2	5.4	7.4
Branko Lazić	5	2	20:50	.778	.316	.750	1.4	0.6	0.0	0.0	7.0	4.6
Stefan Marković	5	5	21:19	.727	.368	1.00	3.2	7.2	2.4	0.0	7.8	16.4
Ognjen Matović	Did not play											
Luka Mitrović	5	1	0:00	.607	.000	.583	4.8	1.2	0.2	0.0	8.2	9.6
Marko Simonović	4	0	14:29	1.00	.083	1.00	2.0	0.0	0.5	0.3	2.0	0.3
Nikola Topić	Did not play											
Luka Vudragović	Did not play											
Aaron White	5	5	15:19	.438	.308	.769	2.8	0.6	1.0	0.0	7.2	6.2
Nate Wolters	Not in the roster											
Maik Zirbes	4	0	10:06	.583	.000	.500	1.3	0.3	1.0	0.0	4.0	3.8

Last updated: June 20, 2022.
Source: Serbian Super League

=== EuroLeague ===
Player	GP	GS	MPG	2FG%	3FG%	FT%	RPG	APG	SPG	BPG	PPG	PIR
Dejan Davidovac	28	13	18:34	.526	.368	.714	3.3	0.9	0.8	0.2	5.0	7.3
Ognjen Dobrić	29	13	22:35	.458	.372	.722	1.9	1.3	0.7	0.1	10.3	7.3
Austin Hollins	28	17	20:39	.548	.300	.833	1.9	1.0	1.0	0.1	8.1	5.4
Nikola Ivanović	27	0	15:21	.417	.346	.769	1.6	2.4	0.5	0.0	7.6	8.5
Nikola Kalinić	32	32	30:03	.521	.278	.710	3.9	3.4	1.0	0.1	12.6	11.7
Ognjen Kuzmić	33	29	17:38	.579	.000	.588	5.1	0.4	0.5	0.3	5.4	8.2
Stefan Lazarević	21	5	12:26	.714	.400	1.000	1.4	0.5	0.5	0.0	2.8	2.3
Branko Lazić	25	2	16:13	.444	.333	.889	1.0	0.4	0.3	0.1	3.7	2.2
Stefan Marković	21	2	12:45	.500	.278	.714	1.5	1.9	0.5	0.0	2.6	2.6
Luka Mitrović	31	11	19:56	.608	.000	.677	4.3	1.7	0.6	0.2	8.3	10.6
Marko Simonović	14	1	11:12	.400	.400	.000	0.6	0.3	0.4	0.0	2.1	0.8
Nikola Topić	1	0	2:17	.000	.000	.000	0.0	0.0	0.0	0.0	0.0	–1.0
Aaron White	18	9	18:06	.423	.286	.824	3.6	1.2	0.6	0.1	5.5	7.4
Nate Wolters	31	31	23:42	.561	.360	.615	2.6	3.6	0.7	0.1	10.9	10.5
Maik Zirbes	11	0	9:00	.640	.000	.857	1.8	0.1	0.4	0.4	3.9	4.3
Marko Gušić	1	0	0:07	.000	.000	.000	0.0	0.0	0.0	0.0	0.0	0.0
Nemanja Popović	Did not play											
Aleksa Uskoković	6	0	10:47	.500	.250	1.000	1.5	1.5	0.5	0.0	1.8	2.3

Last updated: April 8, 2022.
Source: EuroLeague

=== Radivoj Korać Cup ===
Player	GP	GS	MPG	2FG%	3FG%	FT%	RPG	APG	SPG	BPG	PPG	PIR
Dejan Davidovac	3	1	19:29	.333	.250	.875	3.7	1.0	.7	0.0	5.0	8.0
Ognjen Dobrić	3	0	17:41	.600	.364	1.000	3.3	2.3	1.7	0.0	8.7	11.0
Austin Hollins	3	3	20:33	.538	.214	.727	1.7	3.0	1.3	0.0	10.3	9.0
Nikola Ivanović	3	0	15:42	.600	.500	.778	1.0	2.7	0.7	0.0	11.3	13.3
Nikola Kalinić	3	3	24:22	.667	.500	.875	3.3	2.7	0.3	0.7	14.3	13.7
Ognjen Kuzmić	3	3	20:17	.667	.000	1.000	6.7	0.3	0.7	0.3	5.0	10.0
Stefan Lazarević	3	0	7:33	.750	.000	1.000	2.0	0.3	0.7	0.0	2.3	4.7
Branko Lazić	3	0	14:11	1.000	.250	1.000	1.3	0.3	0.7	0.0	3.7	3.7
Stefan Marković	3	1	11:12	.750	.636	.667	1.7	2.0	1.0	0.0	9.7	10.3
Luka Mitrović	3	0	16:56	.363	.000	.500	4.0	0.3	1.3	0.0	4.3	5.7
Marko Simonović	1	0	16:30	.000	.333	.000	3.0	2.0	0.0	0.0	3.0	4.0
Aaron White	3	2	13:30	.333	.200	.000	3.3	1.7	0.0	0.0	2.3	2.3
Nate Wolters	2	2	19:31	.636	.375	.750	3.0	4.5	1.0	0.5	13.0	16.0
Maik Zirbes	Not in the roster											

Last updated: February 20, 2022.
Source: Cup

== See also ==
- 2021–22 Red Star Belgrade season
