= 2022 Basketball League of Serbia playoffs =

Serbian Basketball Tournament

Tournament details
- Country: Serbia
- Dates: 7 May – June 2022
- Season: 2021–22
- Teams: 11
- Defending champions: Crvena zvezda mts

Final positions
- Champions: Crvena zvezda mts (22nd title)
- Runners-up: FMP Meridian
- Semifinalists: Mega Mozzart; Partizan NIS

Awards
- Best player: Nikola Ivanović

The 2022 Basketball League of Serbia playoffs are two play-off tournaments that decided the winner of the 2021–22 Basketball League of Serbia season. The playoffs started on 7 May and end in June 2021.

== Qualified teams ==
First ABA League	Regular season
1 Crvena zvezda mts 2 Partizan NIS; 3 FMP Meridian; 4 Mega Mozzart; 5 Borac	1 Zlatibor; 2 Sloga; 3 Vojvodina; 4 Mladost MaxBet; 5 Dynamic VIP PAY; 6 Sloboda

=== Personnel and sponsorship ===
Team	Head coach	Captain	Kit manufacturer	Shirt sponsor
Borac Čačak	(Serbia) Marko Marinović	(Serbia) Nemanja Todorović	—	P.S. Fashion
Crvena zvezda mts	(Montenegro) Dejan Radonjić	(Serbia) Branko Lazić	Adidas	mts / SoccerBet
Dynamic VIP PAY	(Serbia) Saša Nikitović		Ardu Sport	VIP PAY
FMP	(Serbia) Nenad Stefanović	(Serbia) Marko Radonjić	Adidas	—
Mega Mozzart	(Serbia) Vlada Jovanović	(Serbia) Luka Cerovina	Adidas	Mozzart
Mladost MaxBet	(Serbia) Dragan Jakovljević	(Serbia) Marko Milenković	CK	MaxBet
Partizan NIS	(Serbia) Željko Obradović	(Serbia) Rade Zagorac	Under Armour	NIS / mts
Sloboda	(Serbia) Oliver Popović		Ardu Sport	mts
Sloga	(Serbia) Marko Dimitrijević		—	—
Vojvodina	(Serbia) Miroslav Nikolić	(Serbia) Krsto Bjelica	Peak	—
Zlatibor	(Serbia) Strajin Nedović	(Serbia) Dušan Kutlešić	Ardu Sport	—

== SuperLeague Playoffs ==
Teams involved:

- 2 lowest-placed Serbian teams from the First ABA League: Mega Mozzart, Borac
- 6 highest-placed teams from the Regular season: Zlatibor, Sloga, Vojvodina, Mladost MaxBet, Dynamic VIP PAY, Sloboda

The SuperLeague Playoffs were played best-of-three format (1–1–1).

=== Bracket ===
Quarterfinals
7–9 May
Mega Mozzart	2
Sloboda	0
7–9 May
Sloga	0
Vojvodina	2
7–9 May
Borac	2
Dynamic VIP PAY	0
7–9 May
Zlatibor	0
Mladost MaxBet	2

Semifinals
14–16 May
Mega Mozzart	2
Vojvodina	0
14–18 May
Borac	2
Mladost MaxBet	1

Final
22–24 May
Mega Mozzart	2
Borac	0

=== Quarterfinals ===
Team 1	Series	Team 2	Game 1	Game 2	Game 3
Mega Mozzart	2−0	Sloboda	79−78	98−73	—
Sloga	0–2	Vojvodina	67−95	80–104	—
Borac	2–0	Dynamic VIP PAY	76−68	93–78	—
Zlatibor	0–2	Mladost MaxBet	90−103	71–106	—

==== Game 1 ====
7 May 2022	Mega Mozzart	79–78 (Series: 1−0)	Sloboda	Belgrade
19:00	Scoring by quarter: 29−12, 14−25, 14−21, 22−20
	Pts: Cerovina 16; Rebs: Ruzhentsev, Rudan 9 Asts: Rudan, Uskoković 4 PIR: Ruzhentsev, Rudan 18	Boxscore	Pts: Prijović, Ilić, Miladinović 14; Rebs: Prijović 11; Asts: Ilkić 7 PIR: Prijović 20	Arena: Mega Factory; Attendance: 500; Referees: Uroš Nikolić, Jasmina Juras, Vladimir Vesković

7 May 2022	Sloga	67–95 (Series: 0−1)	Vojvodina	Kraljevo
19:30	Scoring by quarter: 15−24, 14−22, 20−27, 18−22
	Pts: Gašić 13; Rebs: Matović 8 Asts: Karapandžić 6 PIR: Karapandžić 13	Boxscore	Pts: Popović 15; Rebs: Beslać 8 Asts: Bjelica 14; PIR: Bjelica 28	Arena: Kraljevo Sports Hall; Attendance: 1,000; Referees: Vladimir Jevtović, Siniša Prpa, Marko Strika

7 May 2022	Borac	76–68 (Series: 1−0)	Dynamic VIP PAY	Čačak
19:00	Scoring by quarter: 15−17, 15−18, 26−15, 20−18
	Pts: Pecarski 18; Rebs: Todorović 9 Asts: Đoković 5 PIR: Pecarski 21	Boxscore	Pts: Radosavljević 17; Rebs: Radosavljević 11; Asts: Šulović 7 PIR: Radosavljević, Šulović 20	Arena: Borac Hall; Attendance: 1,500; Referees: Milivoje Jovčić, Ivan Stefanović, Strahinja Dašić

7 May 2022	Zlatibor	90–103 (Series: 0−1)	Mladost MaxBet	Čajetina
17:00	Scoring by quarter: 16−26, 25−27, 20–27, 29−23
	Pts: Adžić 31; Rebs: Tadić 7 Asts: Tadić 7 PIR: Adžić 37	Boxscore	Pts: Bojić 37; Rebs: Bojić 8 Asts: Gibson 4 PIR: Bojić 42	Arena: Čajetina Sports Center; Attendance: 600; Referees: Nemanja Ninković, Marko Pecelj, Aleksandar Milojević

==== Game 2 ====
9 May 2022	Sloboda	73–98 (Series: 0−2)	Mega Mozzart	Užice
19:00	Scoring by quarter: 21−16, 17−35, 19−24, 16−23
	Pts: Ilkić 16; Rebs: Ilkić 8 Asts: Ilkić 7 PIR: Ilkić 27	Boxscore	Pts: Cerovina 20; Rebs: Ruzhentsev 9 Asts: Cerovina 7 PIR: Cerovina 27	Arena: Veliki Park Hall; Attendance: 1,900; Referees: Uroš Obrknežević, Radoš Arsenijević, Dragan Matić

9 May 2022	Vojvodina	104–80 (Series: 2−0)	Sloga	Novi Sad
17:00	Scoring by quarter: 29−26, 33−18, 26−20, 16−16
	Pts: Popović 17; Rebs: Popović 10; Asts: Bjelica 5 PIR: Popović 25	Boxscore	Pts: Simeunović 31; Rebs: Matović 6 Asts: Karapandžić 6 PIR: Simeunović 23	Arena: SPC Vojvodina; Attendance: 60; Referees: Uroš Nikolić, Stefan Ćalić, Nemanja Vlahović

9 May 2022	Dynamic VIP PAY	78–93 (Series: 0−2)	Borac	Belgrade
18:00	Scoring by quarter: 20−29, 18−33, 30−15, 10−16
	Pts: Šulović 15; Rebs: Radosavljević 11; Asts: Radosavljević 8 PIR: Radosavljević 23	Boxscore	Pts: Novaković 23; Rebs: Marinković 8 Asts: Đoković 7 PIR: López 22	Arena: Ranko Žeravica Sports Hall; Attendance: 500; Referees: Ilija Belošević, Petar Pešić, Danilo Petković

9 May 2022	Mladost Maxbet	106–71 (Series: 2−0)	Zlatibor	Zemun
18:00	Scoring by quarter: 37−27, 25−24, 23−13, 21−7
	Pts: Bojić 29; Rebs: Bojić 9 Asts: Gibson 6 PIR: Bojić 34	Boxscore	Pts: Tadić 25; Rebs: Adžić, Joksimović, Nikolić 8 Asts: Tadić 9 PIR: Tadić 22	Arena: Master Sports Centar; Attendance: 100; Referees: Marko Juras, Jasmina Juras, Danilo Petković

=== Semifinals ===
Team 1	Series	Team 2	Game 1	Game 2	Game 3
Mega Mozzart	2−0	Vojvodina	87−60	83–79	—
Borac	2–1	Mladost MaxBet	102−86	82–85	97–74

==== Game 1 ====
14 May 2022	Mega Mozzart	87–60 (Series: 1−0)	Vojvodina	Belgrade
17:00	Scoring by quarter: 28−12, 29−8, 13−25, 17−15
	Pts: Simanić 18; Rebs: Simanić 12; Asts: Cerovina 5 PIR: Simanić 28	Boxscore	Pts: Beslać 16; Rebs: Popović 7 Asts: Neal, Rakićević 4 PIR: Beslać 21	Arena: Mega Factory; Attendance: 50; Referees: Vladimir Jevtović, Nemanja Ninković, Stefan Ćalić

14 May 2022	Borac	102–86 (Series: 1−0)	Mladost MaxBet	Čačak
20:00	Scoring by quarter: 31–28, 20–27, 30–20, 21−11
	Pts: Pecarski 25; Rebs: Pecarski 8 Asts: Ćurčić, López 4 PIR: Pecarski 31	Boxscore	Pts: Bojić 35; Rebs: Gibson 8 Asts: Gibson 3 PIR: Bojić 39	Arena: Borac Hall; Attendance: 1,000; Referees: Ilija Belošević, Ivan Stefanović, Marko Pecelj

==== Game 2 ====
16 May 2022	Vojvodina	79–83 (Series: 0−2)	Mega Mozzart	Novi Sad
19:00	Scoring by quarter: 21–25, 24–17, 19–21, 15–20
	Pts: Gaćeša 19; Rebs: Gaćeša 10; Asts: Ralpheal 7 PIR: Gaćeša, Rakićević 21	Boxscore	Pts: Ruzhentsev, Simanić 16; Rebs: Ruzhentsev, Uskoković 6 Asts: Ruzhentsev, Uskoković 5 PIR: Uskoković 20	Arena: SPC Vojvodina; Attendance: 120; Referees: Milivoje Jovčić, Marko Juras, Petar Pešić

16 May 2022	Mladost MaxBet	85–82 (Series: 1−1)	Borac	Zemun
17:00	Scoring by quarter: 23–18, 18–22, 21–27, 23–15
	Pts: Bojić 31; Rebs: Livingston 9 Asts: Livingston 8 PIR: Livingston 33	Boxscore	Pts: Pecarski 30; Rebs: R. Đoković 9 Asts: López 8 PIR: Pecarski 36	Arena: Master Sport Center; Attendance: 100; Referees: Uroš Obrknežević, Siniša Prpa, Jasmina Juras

==== Game 3 ====
18 May 2022	Borac	97–74 (Series: 2−1)	Mladost MaxBet	Čačak
20:00	Scoring by quarter: 19–16, 22–19, 28−27, 28−12
	Pts: Pecarski 24; Rebs: Novaković 10; Asts: López 8 PIR: Pecarski 33	Boxscore	Pts: Livingston 31; Rebs: Kovačević 7 Asts: Milosavljević 4 PIR: Livingston 26	Arena: Borac Hall; Attendance: 1,000; Referees: Aleksandar Glišić, Marko Strika, Strahinja Dašić

=== Finals ===
Team 1	Series	Team 2	Game 1	Game 2	Game 3
Mega Mozzart	2–0	Borac	85–71	75−82	—

==== Game 1 ====
22 May 2022	Mega Mozzart	85–71 (Series: 1−0)	Borac	Belgrade
12:00	Scoring by quarter: 32–22, 20–17, 13–22, 20–10
	Pts: Simanić 17; Rebs: Ruzhentsev, Simanić, Rudan 7 Asts: Uskoković 8 PIR: Uskoković, Simanić 18	Boxscore	Pts: Pecarski, Marinokvić 11; Rebs: Pecarski 6 Asts: Đoković 4 PIR: Ćurčić 11	Arena: Mega Factory; Attendance: 150; Referees: Aleksandar Glišić, Jasmina Juras, Radoš Arsenijević

==== Game 2 ====
24 May 2022	Borac	75–82 (Series: 0−2)	Mega Mozzart	Čačak
18:00	Scoring by quarter: 22−27, 15−17, 18−20, 20−18
	Pts: Pecarski 25; Rebs: Pecarski 9 Asts: Đoković 4 PIR: Pecarski 26	Boxscore	Pts: Simanić 20; Rebs: Ruzhentsev 10; Asts: Ruzhentsev, Cerovina 3 PIR: Ruzhentsev 21	Arena: Borac Hall; Attendance: 1,500; Referees: Milivoje Jovčić, Aleksandar Milojević, Petar Pešić

== SuperLeague Final Four ==
Teams involved:

- 3 highest-placed Serbian teams from the First ABA League: Crvena zvezda mts, Partizan NIS, FMP Meridian
- winner of the SuperLeague Playoffs: Mega Mozzart

=== Bracket ===
Semifinals
10−12 June
Crvena zvezda mts	2
Mega Mozzart	1
Partizan NIS
FMP Meridian	w/o

Final
June
Crvena zvezda mts	2
FMP Meridian	0

=== Semifinals ===
Team 1	Series	Team 2	Game 1	Game 2	Game 3
Crvena zvezda mts	2–1	Mega Mozzart	114–78	70–77	88–66
Partizan NIS	w/o	FMP Meridian	0–20	0–20	—

On 9 June 2022, Partizan announced withdrawal from the 2022 Serbian League playoffs following numerous fan incidents in the 2022 ABA League Finals. Following their withdrawal, FMP Meridian advanced to the Finals.

==== Game 1 ====
10 June 2022	Crvena zvezda mts	114–78 (Series: 1−0)	Mega Mozzart	Belgrade
20:00	Scoring by quarter: 33–15, 25–24, 31–17, 25–22
	Pts: Ivanović 25; Rebs: Dobrić 7 Asts: Marković 11; PIR: Ivanović 32	Boxscore	Pts: Ruzhentsev 16; Rebs: Ruzhentsev, Grbović 6 Asts: Uskoković 10; PIR: Uskoković 18	Arena: Aleksandar Nikolić Hall; Attendance: 4,236; Referees: Uroš Obrknežević, Marko Juras, Siniša Prpa

10 June 2022	Partizan NIS	0–20 (Series: 0−1)	FMP Meridian	Belgrade
		Boxscore		Arena: Štark Arena
Note: Partizan has been forfeited 0–20 following their withdraw from the competition.

==== Game 2 ====
12 June 2022	Mega Mozzart	77–70 (Series: 1−1)	Crvena zvezda mts	Belgrade
12:00	Scoring by quarter: 12–22, 14–16, 28–15, 23–17
	Pts: Ruzhentsev 23; Rebs: Rudan 18; Asts: Uskoković 5 PIR: Rudan 32	Boxscore	Pts: Mitrović 16; Rebs: Mitrović 9 Asts: Ivanović 8 PIR: Mitrović 17	Arena: Mega Factory; Attendance: 326; Referees: Uroš Nikolić, Marko Pecelj, Stefan Ćalić

12 June 2022	FMP Meridian	20–0	Partizan NIS	Belgrade
		Boxscore		Arena: Železnik Hall
Note: Partizan has been forfeited 0–20 following their withdraw from the competition.

==== Game 3 ====
14 June 2022	Crvena zvezda mts	88–66 (Series: 2–1)	Mega Mozzart	Belgrade
18:30	Scoring by quarter: 26–16, 27–17, 15–12, 20–21
	Pts: Kalinić 21; Rebs: Mitrović 7 Asts: Marković 8 PIR: Kalinić 26	Boxscore	Pts: Ruzhentsev, Simanić 12; Rebs: Rudan, Ruzhentsev, Simanić 6 Asts: Uskoković 8 PIR: Simanić 20	Arena: Aleksandar Nikolić Hall; Attendance: 4,023; Referees: Aleksandar Glišić, Vladimir Jevtović, Radoš Arsenijević

=== Finals ===
Team 1	Series	Team 2	Game 1	Game 2	Game 3
Crvena zvezda mts	1–0	FMP Meridian	110–71	71–59	—

==== Game 1 ====
17 June 2022	Crvena zvezda mts	110–71 (Series: 1–0)	FMP Meridian	Belgrade
19:00	Scoring by quarter: 27–18, 29–11, 26–23, 31–19
	Pts: Kuzmić 17; Rebs: Kuzmić 7 Asts: Ivanović 9 PIR: Ivanović 27	Boxscore	Pts: Tasić 19; Rebs: Tasić 7 Asts: Tasić 4 PIR: Tasić 28	Arena: Aleksandar Nikolić Hall; Attendance: 3,978; Referees: Uroš Obrknežević, Uroš Nikolić, Ivan Stefanović

Starters:			Pts	Reb	Ast
G	27	(Serbia) Stefan Marković	9	2	7
SG	14	(United States) Austin Hollins	6	0	2
F	12	(Serbia) Nikola Kalinić	4	2	4
PF	30	(United States) Aaron White	9	2	0
C	32	(Serbia) Ognjen Kuzmić	17	7	0
Reserves:					
SF	2	(Serbia) Stefan Lazarević	8	0	0
G/F	7	(Serbia) Dejan Davidovac	2	3	3
F/C	9	(Serbia) Luka Mitrović	11	2	2
SF	10	(Serbia) Branko Lazić	11	0	0
SG	13	(Serbia) Ognjen Dobrić	14	0	1
PG	20	(Montenegro) Nikola Ivanović	13	3	9
C	33	(Germany) Maik Zirbes	6	0	0
Head coach:
(Basketball Federation of Montenegro) Dejan Radonjić

Crvena zvezda mts	FMP Meridian

CZV	Statistics	FMP
35–46 (76%)	2-pt field goals	18–34 (52%)
8–20 (40%)	3-pt field goals	7–15 (46%)
16–19 (84%)	Free throws	14–18 (77%)
10	Offensive rebounds	11
15	Defensive rebounds	14
25	Total rebounds	25
28	Assists	18
13	Turnovers	26
19	Steals	9
1	Blocks	2
20	Fouls	19

Starters:			Pts	Reb	Ast
PG	7	(Serbia) Milutin Vujičić	3	3	2
G	13	(Serbia) Marko Radonjić	14	0	1
SF	22	(Serbia) Ranko Simović	0	0	1
PF	12	(Serbia) Danilo Tasić	19	7	4
C	5	(Serbia) Marko Pavićević	1	0	0
Reserves:					
G/F	10	(Serbia) Nikola Šaranović	4	0	3
C	15	(Nigeria) Ebuka Izundu	3	2	2
F	24	(Serbia) Nenad Nerandžić	16	4	0
PF	26	(Serbia) Aleksa Stepanović	9	4	2
SG	55	(Serbia) Nikola Manojlović	2	1	3
SF	77	(Bosnia and Herzegovina) Stefan Lakić	DNP		
Head coach:
(Basketball Federation of Serbia) Nenad Stefanović

==== Game 2 ====
19 June 2022	FMP Meridian	59–71 (Series: 0–2)	Crvena zvezda mts	Belgrade
20:00	Scoring by quarter: 9–15, 22–19, 14–25, 14–12
	Pts: Radonjić 14; Rebs: Tasić, Izundu 6 Asts: Radonjić 6 PIR: Radonjić 16	Boxscore	Pts: Ivanović 21; Rebs: Ivanović 6 Asts: Kalinić, Ivanović 5 PIR: Ivanović 31	Arena: Železnik Hall; Attendance: 3,212; Referees: Aleksandar Glišić, Vladimir Jevtović, Nemanja Ninković

Starters:			Pts	Reb	Ast
G	13	(Serbia) Marko Radonjić	14	5	6
SG	55	(Serbia) Nikola Manojlović	3	2	4
SF	22	(Serbia) Ranko Simović	3	3	0
PF	12	(Serbia) Danilo Tasić	6	6	2
C	15	(Nigeria) Ebuka Izundu	2	6	0
Reserves:					
C	5	(Serbia) Marko Pavićević	7	2	1
PG	6	(Slovenia) Jakob Zajc	0	0	0
G	7	(Serbia) Milutin Vujičić	DNP		
G/F	10	(Serbia) Nikola Šaranović	2	5	3
F	24	(Serbia) Nenad Nerandžić	11	3	0
PF	26	(Serbia) Aleksa Stepanović	11	4	1
SF	77	(Bosnia and Herzegovina) Stefan Lakić	0	1	0
Head coach:
(Basketball Federation of Serbia) Nenad Stefanović

FMP Meridian	Crvena zvezda mts

FMP	Statistics	CZV
13–36 (36%)	2-pt field goals	15–28 (53%)
7–25 (28%)	3-pt field goals	8–27 (29%)
12–18 (66%)	Free throws	17–26 (65%)
17	Offensive rebounds	10
24	Defensive rebounds	24
41	Total rebounds	34
17	Assists	15
22	Turnovers	16
7	Steals	14
3	Blocks	1
29	Fouls	22

Starters:			Pts	Reb	Ast
G	27	(Serbia) Stefan Marković	8	3	4
SF	10	(Serbia) Branko Lazić	7	0	0
F	12	(Serbia) Nikola Kalinić	12	2	5
PF	30	(United States) Aaron White	5	2	0
C	32	(Serbia) Ognjen Kuzmić	9	3	0
Reserves:					
SF	2	(Serbia) Stefan Lazarević	3	4	1
G/F	7	(Serbia) Dejan Davidovac	0	0	0
F/C	9	(Serbia) Luka Mitrović	4	2	0
SF	19	(Serbia) Marko Simonović	2	1	0
PG	20	(Montenegro) Nikola Ivanović	21	6	5
C	33	(Germany) Maik Zirbes	0	2	0
Head coach:
(Basketball Federation of Montenegro) Dejan Radonjić

== See also ==
- List of current Basketball League of Serbia team rosters
- 2022 ABA League First Division Playoffs
- 2021–22 KK Crvena zvezda season
