= 2020–21 National Basketball League (Bulgaria) season =

NBL
- Duration: 10 October 2020 – 29 May 2021
- Games played: 108 (Regular season)
- Teams: 9
- TV partner(s): Max Sport

Regular season
- Season MVP: Danilo Tasic

Finals
- Champions: Levski
- Runners-up: Rilski Sportist
- Third place: Academic Plovdiv
- Fourth place: Balkan
- Finals MVP: Danilo Tasic

Statistical leaders
- Points: Diante Baldwin 20.4
- Rebounds: Terrance Thompson 11.5
- Assists: Diante Baldwin 8.5
- Index Rating: Danilo Tasic 28.9

Records
- Biggest home win: Balkan Botevgrad 113–41Cherno More (19 January 2021)
- Biggest away win: Cherno More 57–110 Levski (17 April 2021)
- Highest scoring: Chernomorets 123-121 Cherno More (30 January 2021)

The 2020–21 National Basketball League (Bulgaria) season is the 80th season of the Bulgarian NBL.

== Teams ==
2020–21 Bulgarian National Basketball League club locations.

Academic Sofia resigned from the league due to financial difficulties.

Club	Last season	Arena	Location	Capacity
Academic Plovdiv	5th	Kolodruma	Plovdiv	6,100
Balkan Botevgrad	1st	Arena Botevgrad	Botevgrad	4,500
Beroe	4th	Municipal Hall	Stara Zagora	1,000
Cherno More Ticha	8th	Hristo Borisov	Varna	1,000
Chernomorets	7th	Boycho Branzov	Burgas	1,000
Levski Lukoil	2nd	Universiada Hall	Sofia	4,000
Rilski Sportist	3rd	Arena Samokov	Samokov	2,500
Spartak Pleven	9th	Balkanstroy	Pleven	1,200
Yambol	10th	Diana	Yambol	3,000

== Regular season ==
In the regular season, teams play against each other three times home-and-away in a double round-robin format. The eight first qualified teams advance to the playoffs.

=== League table ===
Pos	Team	Pld	W	L	PF	PA	PD	Pts	Qualification
1	Rilski Sportist	24	22	2	2256	1788	+468	46	Advance to playoffs
2	Levski Lukoil	24	20	4	2146	1833	+313	44	Advance to playoffs
3	Balkan Botevgrad	24	17	7	2082	1810	+272	41	Advance to playoffs
4	Chernomorets	24	12	12	2123	2118	+5	36	Advance to playoffs
5	Academic Plovdiv	24	11	13	2025	2013	+12	35	Advance to playoffs
6	Beroe	24	11	13	1985	2025	−40	35	Advance to playoffs
7	Yambol	24	9	15	1908	2051	−143	33	Advance to playoffs
8	Spartak Pleven	24	4	20	1847	2223	−376	28	Advance to playoffs
9	Cherno More Ticha	24	2	22	1726	2237	−511	26	

Updated to match(es) played on 17 April 2021. Source: NBL

=== Results ===
Home \ Away	ACP	BAL	BER	CMT	CHE	LEV	RIL	SPA	YAM	ACP	BAL	BER	CMT	CHE	LEV	RIL	SPA	YAM
Academic Plovdiv		70–81	97–89	87–72	96–104	71–84	89–99	87–58	83–67				84–70			82–100	94–76	102–77
Balkan	91–77		72–79	113–41	79–87	76–81	80–87	85–79	85–70	85–75		106–84		92–86				101–77
Beroe	80–81	94–90		102–63	100–95	77–79	78–92	91–79	64–75	68–93				76–72			87–72	75–83
Cherno More	82–97	72–86	63–78		85–82	88–121	64–95	66–77	77–87		78–99	76–80			57–110	59–108		
Chernomorets	89–77	76–92	123–121	79–67		93–75	86–100	80–82	92–94	98–88			97–84				95–75	89–83
Levski Lukoil	108–84	66–68	100–66	102–74	81–68		73–87	100–67	86–78	70–69	78–74	86–85		86–76				
Rilski Sportist	97–77	71–76	74–64	96–45	108–91	64–75		119–79	83–64		82–77	109–67		110–85	93–79			
Spartak Pleven	92–93	61–102	68–87	71–92	82–91	81–97	78–110		83–80		70–80		103–98		84–116	67–98		
Yambol	76–72	69–92	78–93	87–68	84–89	75–105	71–87	85–74					96–86		80–87	82–89	92–89	

Updated to match(es) played on 17 April 2021. Source: NBL
Legend: Blue = home team win; Red = away team win.

== Playoffs ==
=== Bracket ===
Quarterfinals
1	Rilski Sportist	100	109
8	Spartak Pleven	71	67
4	Chernomorets	77	77
5	Academic Plovdiv	95	91
2	Levski	92	102
7	Yambol	62	101
3	Balkan	94	85	82
6	Beroe	58	86	67

Semifinals
1	Rilski Sportist	89	105	66
5	Academic Plovdiv	84	86	58
2	Levski	80	84	81	103
3	Balkan	70	53	100	101

Finals
1	Rilski Sportist	85	79	94	84	69
2	Levski	89	87	89	90	84
Third place
5	Academic Plovdiv	68	72	87
3	Balkan	82	59	84

== Player of the round ==
Round	Player	Team	PIR
1	(Serbia) Danilo Tasic	Levski Lukoil	37
2	(Serbia) Danilo Tasic	Levski Lukoil	28
3	(Bulgaria) Aleksandar Yanev	Cherno More	34
4	(Bulgaria) Georgi Boyanov	Cherno More	40
5	(Serbia) Danilo Tasic	Levski Lukoil	42
6	(United States) Diante Baldwin	Chernomorets	47
7	(United States) Brady Rose	Beroe	30
8	(United States) James Gavin	Beroe	35
9	(Serbia) Danilo Tasic	Levski Lukoil	38
10	(United States) Tajuan Agee	Balkan	33
11	(Serbia) Danilo Tasic	Levski Lukoil	36
12	(Bulgaria) Hristo Zahariev	Levski Lukoil	38
13	(Bulgaria) Hristo Zahariev	Levski Lukoil	42
14	(Bulgaria) Dimitar Marincheshki	Spartak Pleven	36
15	(United States) Diante Baldwin	Chernomorets	40
16	(Serbia) Danilo Tasic	Levski Lukoil	32
17	(United States) Marvin Smith	Chernomorets	41
18	(Serbia) Danilo Tasic	Levski Lukoil	41
19	(United States) Diante Baldwin	Chernomorets	37
20	(United States) Terrance Thompson	Cherno More	39
21	(Bulgaria) Andrei Ivanov	Yambol	33
22	(Bulgaria) Dimitar Marincheshki	Spartak Pleven	29
23	(Chile) Nico Carvacho	Rilski Sportist	35
24	(United States) Eric McGill	Yambol	36
25	(Bulgaria) Hristo Zahariev	Levski Lukoil	35
26	(United States) Trey Porter	Rilski Sportist	28
27	(Serbia) Danilo Tasic	Levski Lukoil	34

== Bulgarian clubs in European competitions ==
Team	Competition	Progress
Balkan	Champions League	First qualifying round
Balkan	FIBA Europe Cup	Quarter-finals
Rilski Sportist	FIBA Europe Cup	Round of 16

== NBL clubs in regional competitions ==
Team	Competition	Progress
Academic Plovdiv	Balkan League	Second Place
Beroe	Balkan League	Fourth Place
