= Jakob Zajc =

Slovenian basketball player

Personal information
- Born: 12 May 2003 (age 23) Ljubljana, Slovenia
- Listed height: 1.80 m (5 ft 11 in)
- Listed weight: 68 kg (150 lb)

Career information
- Playing career: 2022–present
- Position: Point guard

Career history
- 2022: FMP

Jakob Zajc (born 12 May 2003) is a Slovenian professional basketball player who last played for FMP of the Basketball League of Serbia. Standing at 5 ft 11 in (1.80 m) and weighing 150 pounds (68 kg), he plays point guard position.

== Professional career ==
In September 2021, Zajc officially signed his first professional contract with FMP. On 19 June 2022, he made his professional debut in a 71–19 loss to Crvena zvezda mts in the game 2 of the 2022 Serbian League Finals.
