= Marko Gušić =

Serbian basketball player (born 2002)

Crvena zvezda Meridianbet
- Position: Small forward / shooting guard
- League: Basketball League of Serbia; ABA League

Personal information
- Born: 6 August 2002 (age 24) Belgrade, Serbia, FR Yugoslavia
- Listed height: 2.02 m (6 ft 8 in)
- Listed weight: 85 kg (187 lb)

Career information
- Playing career: 2021–present

Career history
- 2021–present: Crvena zvezda
- 2022: → FMP

Marko Gušić (Serbian Cyrillic: Марко Гушић, born 6 August 2002) is a Serbian professional basketball player for Crvena zvezda. Standing at 6 ft 8 in (2.03 m) and weighing 187 pounds (85 kg), he plays both small forward and shooting guard positions.

== Early career ==
Gušić grew up playing basketball for youth systems of Mladost Zemun, Mega Basket, and Vizura before joining to the Crvena zvezda youth system in May 2019.

== Professional career ==
On 25 August 2020, Gušić officially signed his first professional contract with Crvena zvezda. On 24 September 2021, Gušić signed new four-year contract with the Zvezda. On the same day, he made his ABA League debut in their season opening 97–61 win over Split, making 2 points, 2 rebounds, an assist, and 2 steals in under 16 minutes of playing time. On 7 October, he made his EuroLeague debut in a 75–63 win over Maccabi Tel Aviv, recording only seven seconds of playing time. He was loaned to FMP on 28 December 2021.

== Career statistics ==
Legend
GP	Games played	GS	Games started	MPG	Minutes per game
FG%	Field-goal percentage	3P%	3-point field-goal percentage	FT%	Free-throw percentage
RPG	Rebounds per game	APG	Assists per game	SPG	Steals per game
BPG	Blocks per game	PPG	Points per game	PIR	Performance index rating
**Bold**	Career high

=== Euroleague ===
Year	Team	GP	GS	MPG	FG%	3P%	FT%	RPG	APG	SPG	BPG	PPG	PIR
2021–22	Crvena zvezda mts	1	0	0:07	.000	.000	.000	0.0	0.0	0.0	0.0	0.0	0.0
Career		1	0	0:07	.000	.000	.000	0.0	0.0	0.0	0.0	0.0	0.0

== Personal life ==
His grandfather was Novica Gušić, a colonel in the Army of Republika Srpska.
