= Luka Vudragović =

Serbian basketball player (born 2004)

No. 77 – Pepperdine Waves
- Position: Shooting guard
- League: West Coast Conference

Personal information
- Born: 2 June 2004 (age 22) Stari Banovci, Serbia, Serbia and Montenegro
- Listed height: 1.99 m (6 ft 6 in)

Career information
- College: Pepperdine (2025–present)
- Playing career: 2021–present

Career history
- 2021–2022: Crvena zvezda 2
- 2022: FMP
- 2022: →Žitko Basket
- 2023: Sloga
- 2023–2024: Mladost Zemun
- 2024–2025: Metalac Valjevo

Luka Vudragović (Serbian Cyrillic: Лука Вудраговић, born 2 June 2004) is a Serbian college basketball player for the Pepperdine Waves of the West Coast Conference (WCC). Standing at 1.99 m (6 ft 6 in), he plays shooting guard position.

== Early career ==
Vudragović grew up playing basketball for youth system of Vizura before joining to the Crvena zvezda youth system in June 2020. Reportedly, in November 2021 at a Serbian Junior League game, Vudragović nearly broke the backboard support with his dunk.

== Professional career ==
Vudragović was added to the roster of Crvena zvezda for the 2021–22 season. On 3 March 2022, Vudragović officially signed his first amateur contract with Crvena zvezda. On 25 March, he was added to a EuroLeague game roster in a 74–70 road lost to Alba Berlin, without making a debut.

On 28 June 2022, Vudragović signed a four-year contract with FMP Meridian.

== National team career ==
In August 2021, Vudragović was a member of the Serbia U-18 at the FIBA U18 European Challengers in Skopje, North Macedonia. Over five tournament games, he averaged 7.4 points, 2.2 rebounds, and 0.6 assists per game.
