= Nikola Birač =

Serbian basketball coach

Personal information
- Born: 9 August 1986 (age 40) Belgrade, SR Serbia, Yugoslavia
- Position: Assistant coach
- Coaching career: 2010–present

Career history

Coaching
- 2010–2011: FMP Železnik (assistant)
- 2011–2017: Crvena zvezda (assistant)
- 2017: Yeşilgiresun (assistant)
- 2019–2020: Dynamic BG (assistant)
- 2020–2022: Crvena zvezda (assistant)
- 2022–2023: Budućnost (assistant)
- 2023–2024: Galatasaray (assistant)

Nikola Birač (Serbian Cyrillic: Никола Бирач; born 9 August 1986) is a Serbian professional basketball coach who is an assistant coach for Galatasaray of the ABA League and the Montenegrin League.

== Coaching career ==
Birač worked as an assistant coach for Crvena zvezda under Svetislav Pešić, Vlada Vukoičić, and Dejan Radonjić between 2011 and 2017.

In 2017, Birač was an assistant coach for Turkish club Yeşilgiresun under Mihailo Uvalin. In 2018, he filed and won a claim against Yeşilgiresun for outstanding salaries, accommodation and travel expenses.

In August 2019, Birač was named an assistant coach for Dynamic VIP PAY under Miro Alilović.

In December 2020, Birač was named an assistant coach for Crvena zvezda under Dejan Radonjić. He left the Zvezda after the Radonjić's departure in July 2022.

== Career achievements and awards ==
As assistant coach:

- Serbian League champion: 5 (with Crvena zvezda: 2014–15, 2015–16, 2016–17, 2020–21, 2021–22)
- Adriatic League champion: 5 (with Crvena zvezda: 2014–15, 2015–16, 2016–17, 2020–21, 2021–22)
- Serbian Cup winner: 6 (with Crvena zvezda: 2012–13, 2013–14, 2014–15, 2016–17, 2020–21, 2021–22)
- Magenta Sport Cup winner: 1 (with Crvena zvezda: 2021)
