= Nickolas Neal =

American basketball player (born 1988)

Free agent
- Position: Point guard

Personal information
- Born: November 17, 1988 (age 37) Detroit, Michigan
- Listed height: 6 ft 0 in (1.83 m)

Career information
- High school: St. Petersburg HS (St. Petersburg, Florida)
- College: Purdue North Central (2010–2012)
- NBA draft: 2012: undrafted
- Playing career: 2013–present

Career history
- 2013–2017: Sunshine Vieste
- 2017–2018: Tskhum-Abkhazeti
- 2018–2019: Cactus Tbilisi
- 2019–2020: Alkar
- 2020: HydroTruck Radom
- 2020–2021: Legia Warszawa
- 2021–2022: Vojvodina

Career highlights
- Croatian League MVP (2020); Croatian League steals leader (2020)

Nickolas Ralpheal Neal (born November 17, 1988) is an American professional basketball player who last played for Vojvodina of the Basketball League of Serbia. He played college basketball at Purdue North Central from 2010 to 2012.

== College career ==
In his junior season (2011), he was a second team All-Conference selection with 16.5 points per game.

In 2016, Neal was inducted into the Purdue North Central Hall of Fame.

== Professional career ==
He started his professional career with BK Team Vieste (Serie C Silver) in Italy. By first four years in Italy he never averaged lower than 24.4 points per game. On November 2, 2018, he has signed with BC Cactus Tbilisi of the Georgian Superliga. During 2018-19 season he averaged 16.1 points, 3.8 rebounds and 4.4 assists per game.

Neal joined the Croatian league's KK Alkar on August 21, 2019. He scored 18.4 points per game, 5.5 assists, 3.8 rebounds and 2.1 steals in 20 games.

On May 29, 2020, he signed with HydroTruck Radom of the Polish Basketball League. He averaged 14.9 points, 4.7 assists and 1.6 steals per game. On September 29, 2020 he was named MVP of the fifth round Polish Basketball League.

On November 18, 2020, he signed with Legia Warszawa of the Polish Basketball League. Neal averaged 8.9 points, 3.1 assists, and 2.0 rebounds per game. On October 10, 2021, he signed with Vojvodina of the Basketball League of Serbia.
