= Austin Hollins =

American basketball player (born 1991)

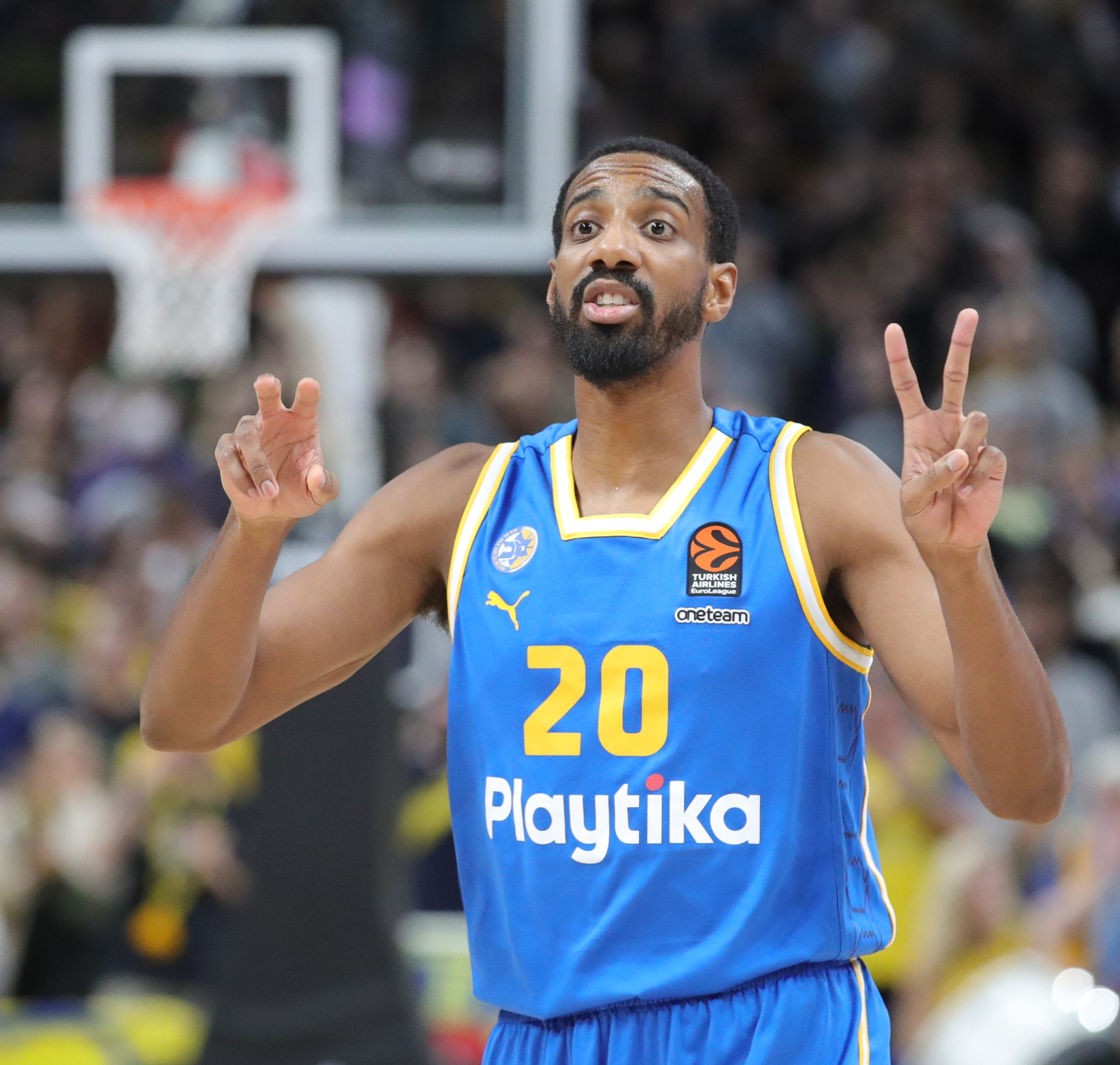
- Hollins with Maccabi Tel Aviv in 2022

Free agent
- Position: Small forward / Shooting guard

Personal information
- Born: November 8, 1991 (age 35) Chandler, Arizona, U.S.
- Listed height: 6 ft 4 in (1.93 m)
- Listed weight: 190 lb (86 kg)

Career information
- High school: Germantown (Germantown, Tennessee)
- College: Minnesota (2010–2014)
- NBA draft: 2014: undrafted
- Playing career: 2014–present

Career history
- 2014–2016: Denain Voltaire
- 2016–2017: Kauhajoen Karhu
- 2017–2018: Gießen 46ers
- 2018–2019: Rasta Vechta
- 2019–2021: Zenit Saint Petersburg
- 2021–2022: Crvena zvezda
- 2022–2023: Maccabi Tel Aviv
- 2023–2024: Žalgiris Kaunas
- 2024: AEK Athens
- 2025: Karşıyaka Basket

Career highlights
- ABA League champion (2022); Serbian League champion (2022); Serbian Cup winner (2022); BBL All-Star Game Dunking champion (2019); NIT champion (2014); NIT MVP (2014)

Austin James Hollins (born November 8, 1991) is an American professional basketball player who last played for Karşıyaka Basket of the Basketbol Süper Ligi (BSL). He played college basketball for the University of Minnesota.

== Early life ==
Hollins was born in Arizona on November 8, 1991, and moved to Memphis, Tennessee, in the sixth grade. As a child, Hollins would practice basketball for hours, until his father forced him to stop playing.

Hollins attended Germantown High School, where he lettered on the basketball team under head coach Newton Mealer. He averaged just under 16 points per game as a junior, playing alongside future Belmont signee Ian Clark, on a team that went 20–12. Hollins drew attention from college programs, including Arizona State, Arkansas, Baylor, Georgia, Minnesota, Oregon State and the University of Memphis. As a senior, he averaged 18.9 points per game, in leading Germantown to a 24–9 record. The team reached the Region 8-AAA quarterfinals, where they lost to the state champion Melrose High School. The Memphis Commercial Appeal named Hollins to the Best of the Preps Class AAA Team. Despite sharing a last name, growing up in the same part of Tennessee, and wearing the same No. 20 jerseys in high school, Austin and Minnesota teammate Andre Hollins, are not related.

== College career ==
As a freshman at Minnesota, playing under head coach Tubby Smith, Hollins averaged 4.5 points and 1.5 rebounds per game. He started five games and posted a 13-point performance against Indiana. After the team failed to receive an invitation to the 2011 NIT, Hollins considered transferring to another school.

In his junior year, he became recognized for his stifling defense. "I take a lot of pride in that, and it's kind of fun, locking down another team's top guy ... you may not hold them to zero points, but just making it tough for them – it's fun," said Hollins. In the 2013 NCAA tournament, Hollins contributed 16 points, four steals and a career-high seven assists, against UCLA in the Round of 64. He tallied 10 points and three rebounds, in the season-ending loss to Florida in the Round of 32.

Hollins scored 20 points and grabbed a career-high 14 rebounds, in a win over South Dakota State, in addition to eclipsing the 1,000 point mark for his college career. As a result, he was named the Big Ten Conference Player of the Week, for the week of December 16, 2013. In his senior year, head coach Richard Pitino referred to Hollins as, "a coach's dream", for his strong work ethic and lead-by-example style. Hollins endured a cold spell in the middle of the season, but regained his form towards the end of the regular season, as he scored 27 points in a win over the Iowa Hawkeyes. In the quarterfinals of the 2014 National Invitation Tournament, Hollins went 6–11 from behind the 3-point arc, and scored a career-high 32 points to help defeat Southern Miss. He scored 12 straight points in the first half to help Minnesota retake the lead. Minnesota won the NIT by defeating SMU, by a score of 63–65, behind 19 points from Hollins. He made the go-ahead 3-pointer with 46.1 seconds remaining and he was named NIT Most Valuable Player. During his college career, Hollins played in a school-record 140 games, breaking the record that was previously held by former teammate Rodney Williams. He led the team in steals with 75 and finished second in scoring average, with an average of 12.4 points per game.

=== College statistics ===
SEASON	TEAM	MIN	FGM-FGA	FG%	3PM-3PA	3P%	FTM-FTA	FT%	REB	AST	BLK	STL	PF	TO	PTS
2010–11	Minnesota	17.0	1.6–3.9	.405	0.4–1.6	.260	0.9–1.3	.692	1.5	1.2	0.3	1.2	1.1	1.0	4.5
2011–12	Minnesota	28.4	3.2–7.1	.450	1.3–3.6	.370	1.4–1.7	.815	2.8	2.1	0.3	1.1	2.2	1.7	9.2
2012–13	Minnesota	29.8	3.5–8.7	.405	1.6–4.6	.338	2.1–2.6	.800	3.2	2.6	0.4	1.7	1.9	1.3	10.7
2013–14	Minnesota	33.1	4.2–9.5	.445	1.7–4.9	.346	2.2–2.9	.771	5.0	2.4	0.5	2.0	1.8	1.6	12.4

== Professional career ==
Hollins wasn't drafted in the 2014 NBA draft. On August 2, 2014, he signed a one-year deal with Denain, of the French 2nd Division LNB Pro B. In 35 games played with Denain in the 2014–15 season (regular season & playoffs), he averaged 8.5 points, 1.7 rebounds, and 0.7 assists per game, in France's 2nd Division. He also spent the 2015–16 season with Denain, in the French 2nd Division, in which he averaged 12.5 points, 2.0 rebounds, and 1.7 assists per game, in 34 games played.

On June 20, 2015, Hollins was locked in to play for the Brooklyn Nets' Summer League squad, in the 2015 NBA Summer League. On July 17, 2016, Hollins signed with the Finnish League team Kauhajoen Karhu. With Karhu, he averaged 17.2 points, 4.7 rebounds, and 2.6 assists per game, in 47 games played in the 2016–17 Finnish League season.

In 2017, he moved to the German League club Gießen 46ers. With the Gießen 46ers, he averaged 12.0 points, 2.7 rebounds, and 2.0 assists per game, in 29 games played in the 2017–18 German League season. In 2018, he moved to the German club Rasta Vechta. With Rasta Vechta, he averaged 16.5 points, 2.7 rebounds, and 1.8 assists per game, in 40 games played in the 2018–19 German League season.

On July 15, 2019, Hollins signed with the Russian club Zenit Saint Petersburg of the VTB United League and the EuroLeague. On June 12, 2021, Hollins and Zenit parted ways after two seasons.

On August 16, 2021, Hollins signed with Crvena zvezda of the EuroLeague, ABA League and the Basketball League of Serbia. The club won ABA League, Serbian League, and Serbian Cup in the 2021–22 season.

On June 27, 2022, Hollins signed with Maccabi Tel Aviv of the Israeli Premier League and EuroLeague. After an injury-plagued season, Hollins parted ways with the Israeli powerhouse on July 10, 2023.

On December 11, 2023, Hollins signed a temporary contract with Žalgiris Kaunas of Lithuanian Basketball League (LKL) and the EuroLeague. On January 15, 2024, he parted ways with the team.

On January 18, 2024, Hollins signed with Greek club AEK Athens for the rest of the season, replacing Ricky Ledo.

On February 26, 2025, he signed with Karşıyaka Basket of the Basketbol Süper Ligi (BSL).

== Career statistics ==
Legend
GP	Games played	GS	Games started	MPG	Minutes per game
FG%	Field-goal percentage	3P%	3-point field-goal percentage	FT%	Free-throw percentage
RPG	Rebounds per game	APG	Assists per game	SPG	Steals per game
BPG	Blocks per game	PPG	Points per game	PIR	Performance index rating
**Bold**	Career high

=== EuroLeague ===
Year	Team	GP	GS	MPG	FG%	3P%	FT%	RPG	APG	SPG	BPG	PPG	PIR
2019–20	Zenit	27	15	**22.8**	.428	.347	.917	**2.1**	**1.5**	**1.4**	**.3**	**10.4**	**7.9**
2020–21	Zenit	**38**	**34**	19.4	**.430**	**.369**	.830	1.7	.9	1.0	.2	8.2	5.8
2021–22	Crvena zvezda	28	17	20.6	.410	.313	.824	1.9	1.0	1.0	.1	8.1	5.4
2022–23	Maccabi	19	5	9.7	.295	.241	**1.000**	1.3	.3	.6	.2	1.8	0.9
2023–24	Žalgiris	8	1	12.0	.385	.350	.800	1.0	.1	.4	—	3.9	0.8
Career		120	72	18.4	.415	.339	.855	1.7	.9	1.0	.2	7.4	5.1

== Personal life ==
Hollins is the son of Angela and Lionel Hollins. He has three siblings: Lamont, Jackie and Anthony. His father is a former NBA player and head coach, who won an NBA championship with the Portland Trail Blazers, in 1977. His father last coached the NBA's Brooklyn Nets.
