= Nemanja Popović =

Serbian basketball player (born 2001)

Free Agent
- Position: Power forward

Personal information
- Born: December 29, 2001 (age 24) Topola, Serbia, FR Yugoslavia
- Listed height: 2.05 m (6 ft 9 in)
- Listed weight: 97 kg (214 lb)

Career information
- Playing career: 2018–present

Career history
- 2018–2019: Crvena zvezda
- 2018–2019: → Žarkovo
- 2019–2021: FMP
- 2019–2020: → OKK Beograd
- 2021–2024: Crvena zvezda
- 2022: → Vojvodina
- 2023–2024: → Mega Basket
- 2024–2025: Vršac
- 2025–2026: Wilki Morskie Szczecin

Career highlights
- All-PLK Team (2026)
Medals
Men's basketball
Representing Serbia
FIBA Europe Under-16 Championship
Bronze medal – third place	2017 Montenegro	U16 team

Nemanja Popović (Serbian Cyrillic: Немања Поповић, born December 29, 2001) is a Serbian professional basketball player who last played for Wilki Morskie Szczecin of the Polish Basketball League (PLK). Standing at 6 ft 9 in (2.06 m) and weighing 214 pounds (97 kg), he plays power forward position.

== Early career ==
Popović started to play basketball for KK BB Basket in Mladenovac. In 2015, he joined Vizura in Belgrade. In summer 2017, Popović was added to the Crvena zvezda youth team. Popović won the second place at the 2017–18 Junior ABA League season with the Zvezda. Over six tournament games, he averaged 9.8 points, 6.1 rebounds and 0.5 assists per game. In August 2018, he participated at the Basketball Without Borders Europe camp in Belgrade, Serbia. In February 2019, Popović participated at the NBA All-Star Basketball Without Borders Global Camp in Charlotte, North Carolina. Popović won the second place at the 2018–19 Junior ABA League season with the Zvezda. Over seven season games, he averaged 14.0 points, 4.7 rebounds and 3.1 assists per game.

== Professional career ==
In January 2018, Popović was added to the Crvena zvezda ABA League roster for the rest of the 2017–18 season. He missed to play a single game during that season. In August 2018, he was loaned out to Žarkovo of the Second League of Serbia. In April 2019, he was added to FMP of the Basketball League of Serbia. On April 27, he made his Serbian League debut against Zlatibor, making 2 points and 3 rebounds in under 14 minutes of playing time. In January 2020, Popović signed a four-year contract with FMP. Following the 2020–21 season Popović declared for the 2021 NBA draft. On July 19, 2021, he withdrawn his name from consideration for the 2021 NBA draft. On 23 September 2021, Popović signed a three-year contract with Crvena zvezda. On the next day, he made his debut for Crvena zvezda in their season opening 97–61 win over Split, making 3 points, a rebound, and an assist in under 11 minutes of playing time. On 5 January 2022, Popović was loaned out to Vojvodina for the rest of the 2021–22 season. He returned to the Zvezda for the 2022 pre-season training camp.

On June 27, 2025, he signed with Wilki Morskie Szczecin of the Polish Basketball League (PLK).

== National team career ==
Popović was a member of the Serbian under-16 national team that won the bronze medal at the 2017 FIBA Europe Under-16 Championship in Montenegro. Over seven tournament games, he averaged 5.9 points, 4.1 rebounds and 2.4 assists per game. Popović was a member of the Serbian under-17 team that participated at the 2018 FIBA Under-17 Basketball World Cup in Argentina. Over seven tournament games, he averaged 5.0 points, 3.3 rebounds and 2.0 assists per game.
