= Danilo Tasić =

Serbian basketball player

No. 15 – Enisey
- Position: Power forward / small forward
- League: VTB United League

Personal information
- Born: 15 June 1993 (age 33) Niš, FR Yugoslavia
- Listed height: 2.07 m (6 ft 9 in)
- Listed weight: 107 kg (236 lb)

Career information
- NBA draft: 2015: undrafted
- Playing career: 2011–present

Career history
- 2011–2016: Konstantin
- 2016–2017: Dinamo București
- 2017–2018: AEK Larnaca
- 2018: Stal Ostrów Wielkopolski
- 2019: Voluntari
- 2019–2020: Pitești
- 2020–2021: Levski Sofia
- 2021–2022: FMP
- 2022–2023: SC Derby
- 2023–2024: Borac Čačak
- 2024: FMP
- 2025: Cedevita Olimpija
- 2025-present: Enisey

Career highlights
- Bulgarian League champion (2021); Cyprus Division A champion (2018); Slovenian League champion (2025); Bulgarian Cup winner (2020); Cypriot Cup winner (2018); Cypriot Super Cup winner (2018); Slovenian Cup winner (2025); Bulgarian League MVP (2021); Bulgarian League Finals MVP (2021)

Danilo Tasić (Serbian Cyrillic: Данило Тасић; born 15 June 1993) is a Serbian professional basketball player for Enisey of the VTB United League.

== Playing career ==
Tasić played for Konstantin (Serbia), Dinamo București (Romania), AEK Larnaca (Cyprus), and Stal Ostrów Wielkopolski (Poland).

In January 2019, Tasić joined Romanian team Voluntari for the rest of the 2018–19 RNL season. On 31 August 2019, he joined Pitești for the 2019–20 season. He left Pitești in January 2020.

In January 2020, Tasić signed for Bulgarian club Levski Sofia. In February 2020, he won a Bulgarian Cup. In April 2021, he was named the Bulgarian League MVP for the 2020–21 NBL season. In May, he won the Bulgarian League Finals MVP award, helping his club to won the Bulgarian League title for the 2020–21 season with a 4–1 win over Rilski Sportist in the finals.

On 3 August 2021, Tasić signed a one-year contract with FMP. On 20 September 2022, Tasić signed a contract with SC Derby of the Prva A Liga.

On August 22, 2025, he signed a contract with the Russian club Enisey of the VTB United League.
