= Magenta SportCup =

Basketball competition in Europe

The Magenta SportCup Tournament or simply called as the Magenta SportCup was a basketball competition played every preseason between teams from the EuroLeague. The format of the competition is played in a tournament style.

KK Crvena zvezda is the incumbent winner of the said tournament.

== History ==
The Magenta SportCup Tournament was an annual competition played every September. The first edition of the tournament was inaugurated in 2021 in Munich, Germany.

== Performance by club ==
Club	Titles	Runners-up	Winning years
KK Crvena zvezda	1	0	2021
FC Bayern Munich	0	1	
Panathinaikos B.C.	0	1	
