= Samson Ruzhentsev =

Russian basketball player

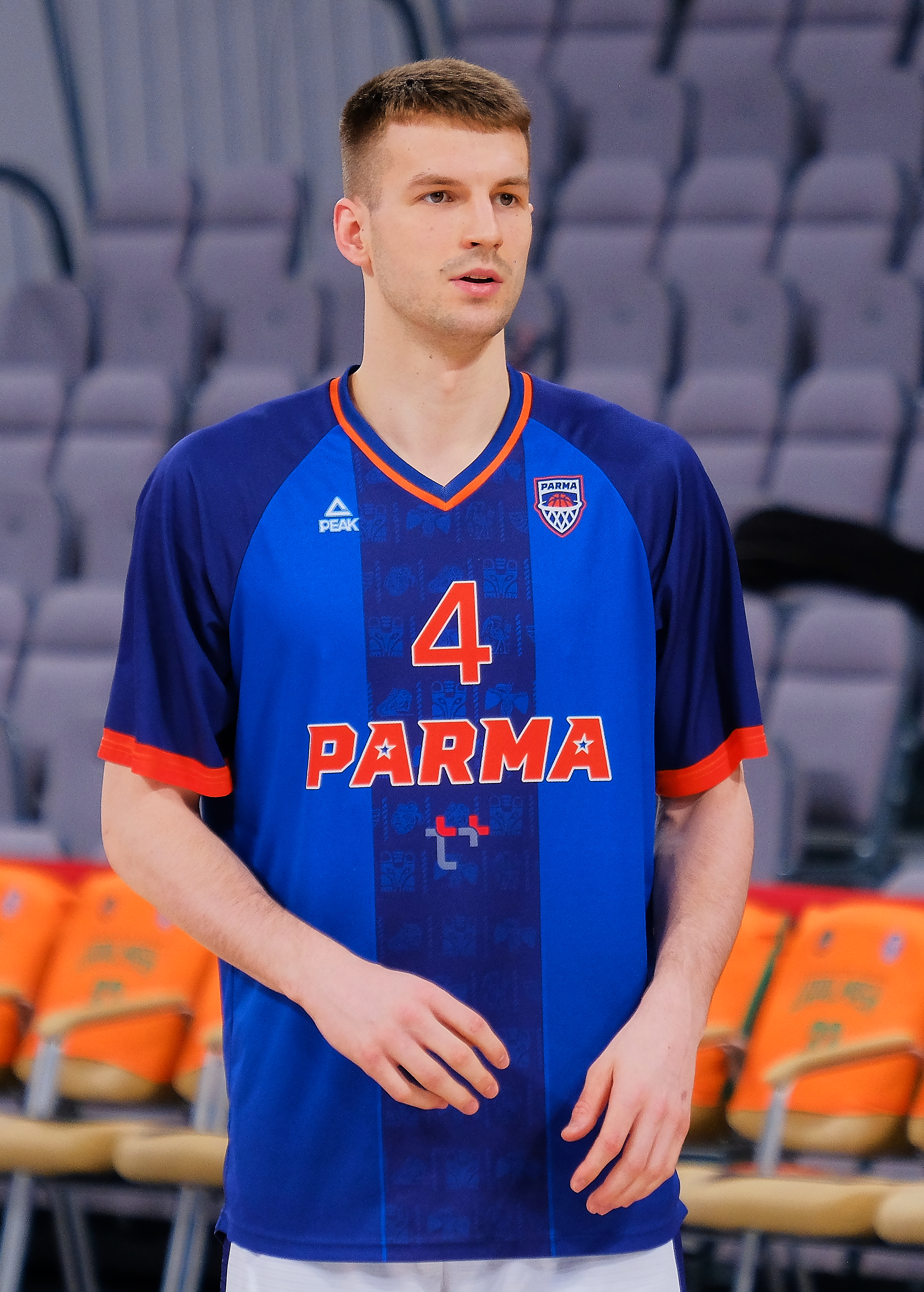

No. 10 – CSKA Moscow
- Position: Small forward
- League: VTB United League

Personal information
- Born: 23 October 2001 (age 25) Moscow, Russia
- Listed height: 2.02 m (6 ft 8 in)
- Listed weight: 95 kg (209 lb)

Career information
- High school: Hamilton Heights Christian Academy (Chattanooga, Tennessee)
- College: Florida (2020–2021)
- Playing career: 2021–present

Career history
- 2021–2022: Mega Basket
- 2022–present: CSKA Moscow

Career highlights
- 3× VTB United League champion (2024–2026)

Samson Ruzhentsev (Russian: Самсон Руженцев; born 23 October 2001) is a Russian professional basketball player for CSKA Moscow of the VTB United League. He played college basketball for the Florida Gators.

== Early career ==
Ruzhentsev played high school basketball with Hamilton Heights Christian Academy in Chattanooga, Tennessee as a senior. He averaged 19.3 points and 6.3 rebounds per game, helping lead the team to a 28–3 record. Also, Ruzhentsev helped Hamilton Heights to three straight NACA national championships.

As a college freshman, Ruzhentsev appeared in 20 games (including one start) at University of Florida in their 2020–21 season, recording two points per game.

== Professional career ==
On 17 June 2021, Ruzhentsev signed a contract with Mega Basket of the Basketball League of Serbia and the ABA League. In the ABA League, Samson played 21 matches, averaging 6.8 points (with 40% from the field and 50% from behind the arc) and making 3 rebounds in 16 minutes of playing time. And in the Basketball League of Serbia, Ruzhentsev became the team's top scorer. In nine games, he averaged 14.6 points and 6.8 rebounds, which is also the best result among Mega players.

In June 2022, Ruzhentsev signed for CSKA Moscow.

== National team career ==
Ruzhentsev was a member of the Russia national under-18 team that took the 6th place at the 2019 FIBA U18 European Championship in Volos, Greece. Over six tournament games, he averaged team-high 12.3 points, 3.2 rebounds, and an assist per game.

== Career statistics ==
Legend
GP	Games played	GS	Games started	MPG	Minutes per game
FG%	Field goal percentage	3P%	3-point field goal percentage	FT%	Free throw percentage
RPG	Rebounds per game	APG	Assists per game	SPG	Steals per game
BPG	Blocks per game	PPG	Points per game	**Bold**	Career high

=== College ===
Year	Team	GP	GS	MPG	FG%	3P%	FT%	RPG	APG	SPG	BPG	PPG
2020–21	Florida	20	1	7.4	.341	.286	.800	.7	.1	.1	.1	2.0
