= Serbia at the 2023 FIBA Basketball World Cup qualification =

Serbia
- Flag of Serbia
- President: Predrag Danilović
- Head coach: Svetislav Pešić
- Arena: Aleksandar Nikolić Hall; Čair Sports Center; Štark Arena
- First round: 3rd, Advance
- Second round: 2nd, Qualified
- Highest home attendance: 19,150; 100–94 Greece (25 August 2022)
- Lowest home attendance: 2,056; 101–100 Latvia (25 November 2021)
- Average home attendance: 7051
- Biggest win: +12; 75–63 Slovakia (25 February 2022)
- Biggest defeat: -7; 59–66 Latvia (30 June 2022)
- All statistics correct as of 26 August 2022.

Serbia competed at the 2023 FIBA Basketball World Cup qualification in the Europe group.

== Background ==
In July 2021, Serbia failed to qualify for the 2020 Summer Olympics.

== Timeline ==
- 12 October 2021: 16-man B-team roster announcement
- ~~17–19 October 2021: B-team training camp~~
- 15 November 2021: 24-man first window roster announced
- 25–28 November 2021: First window
- 15 February 2022: 24-man second window roster announced
- 25–28 February 2022: Second window
- 20 June 2022: 20-man third window roster announced
- 30 June – 3 July 2022: Third window
- 12 July 2022: 22-man fourth window roster announced
- 25–28 August 2022: Fourth window
- 10–13 November 2022: Fifth window
- 24–27 February 2023: Sixth window

== Roster ==
On 15 November 2021, head coach Svetislav Pešić announced an initial 24-man roster for the first window games against Latvia on 25 November and Belgium on 28 November. On 22 November, he announced a 17-man roster, removing from the list seven players due to the EuroLeague schedule conflict; guards Vasilije Micić, Ognjen Jaramaz, Vanja Marinković, Nemanja Nedović, Ognjen Dobrić, forward Dejan Davidovac, and center Filip Petrušev. On 26 November, center Petrušev was re-added to the roster. Forward Alen Smailagić missed the second match due to injury. Guard Jovan Novak, forward Marko Jagodić-Kuridža, and center Dušan Ristić made their senior debuts with the Serbian national team.

On 15 February 2022, head coach Pešić announced an initial 24-man roster for the second window games against Slovakia on 25 and 28 February. Guards Miloš Teodosić and Nikola Rebić were the only players unlisted from the 18-man first window roster, while eight new players were called in. Marko Jagodić-Kuridža was named as the captain of the Serbia team in absence of Miloš Teodosić. Guard-forwards Nikola Đurišić and Nikola Jović, both at age 18, and center Balša Koprivica made their senior debuts with the Serbian national team.

On 20 June 2022, head coach Pešić announced an initial 20-man roster for the third window games against Latvia on 30 June and Belgium on 3 July.

On 12 July 2022, head coach Pešić announced an initial 22-man roster for the fourth window games against Greece on 25 August and Turkey on 28 August, as well as for the upcoming EuroBasket 2022. On 15 August 2022, head coach Pešić, following a cut of team captain Teodosić from the roster, announced forwards Nemanja Bjelica and Vladimir Lučić as co-captains for the second round first window.

The following a 16-man roster for the fourth window games at the 2023 FIBA Basketball World Cup qualification:

Serbia national basketball team – 2023 FIBA Basketball World Cup qualification roster
Players
Coaches

Pos.	No.	Name	Age – Date of birth	Height	Club	Ctr.
F/C	3	Filip Petrušev	22 – 15 April 2000	2.11 m (6 ft 11 in)	Crvena zvezda	(Serbia)
SF	7	Dejan Davidovac	27 – 17 January 1995	2.03 m (6 ft 8 in)	CSKA Moscow	(Russia)
PF	8	Nemanja Bjelica (C)	34 – 9 May 1988	2.06 m (6 ft 9 in)	Fenerbahçe	(Turkey)
SG	9	Vanja Marinković	25 – 9 January 1997	1.98 m (6 ft 6 in)	Baskonia	(Spain)
F	10	Nikola Kalinić	30 – 8 November 1991	2.02 m (6 ft 8 in)	FC Barcelona	(Spain)
F	11	Vladimir Lučić (C)	33 – 17 June 1989	2.03 m (6 ft 8 in)	Bayern Munich	(Germany)
SG	13	Ognjen Dobrić	27 – 27 October 1994	1.98 m (6 ft 6 in)	Crvena zvezda	(Serbia)
C	14	Dušan Ristić	26 – 27 November 1995	2.13 m (7 ft 0 in)	Fuenlabrada	(Spain)
C	15	Nikola Jokić	27 – 19 February 1995	2.11 m (6 ft 11 in)	Denver Nuggets	(United States)
PF	21	Marko Jagodić-Kuridža (DC)	35 – 15 May 1987	2.03 m (6 ft 8 in)	Budućnost	(Montenegro)
G	22	Vasilije Micić	28 – 13 January 1994	1.95 m (6 ft 5 in)	Anadolu Efes	(Turkey)
SG	23	Marko Gudurić	27 – 8 March 1995	2.00 m (6 ft 7 in)	Fenerbahçe	(Turkey)
PG	25	Ognjen Jaramaz	26 – 1 September 1995	1.93 m (6 ft 4 in)	Bayern Munich	(Germany)
PF	28	Boriša Simanić	24 – 20 March 1998	2.11 m (6 ft 11 in)	Zaragoza	(Spain)
C	33	Nikola Milutinov	27 – 13 December 1994	2.13 m (7 ft 0 in)	CSKA Moscow	(Russia)
SF	0	Nikola Jović (X)	19 – 9 June 2003	2.08 m (6 ft 10 in)	Miami Heat	(United States)
SG	1	Nikola Đurišić (X)	18 – 23 February 2004	2.03 m (6 ft 8 in)	Mega	(Serbia)
PG	4	Miloš Teodosić (X)	35 – 19 March 1987	1.95 m (6 ft 5 in)	Virtus Bologna	(Italy)
C	5	Balša Koprivica (X)	22 – 1 May 2000	2.16 m (7 ft 1 in)	Partizan	(Serbia)
SF	6	Nemanja Dangubić (X)	29 – 13 April 1993	2.04 m (6 ft 8 in)	Free agent
PF	9	Alen Smailagić (X)	22 – 18 August 2000	2.08 m (6 ft 10 in)	Partizan	(Serbia)
SG	12	Aleksa Radanov (X)	24 – 1 February 1998	2.02 m (6 ft 8 in)	Peristeri	(Greece)
SF	20	Dejan Todorović (X)	28 – 29 May 1994	1.96 m (6 ft 5 in)	Tenerife	(Spain)
PG	24	Aleksa Uskoković (X)	22 – 30 August 1999	1.90 m (6 ft 3 in)	Mega	(Serbia)
SF	25	Rade Zagorac (X)	27 – 12 August 1995	2.05 m (6 ft 9 in)	Free agent
PG	30	Aleksa Avramović (X)	27 – 25 October 1994	1.92 m (6 ft 4 in)	Partizan	(Serbia)
SG	32	Uroš Trifunović (X)	21 – 5 December 2000	1.99 m (6 ft 6 in)	Partizan	(Serbia)
PG	41	Jovan Novak (X)	27 – 8 November 1994	1.88 m (6 ft 2 in)	Fuenlabrada	(Spain)
C	51	Boban Marjanović (X)	34 – 15 August 1988	2.22 m (7 ft 3 in)	Houston Rockets	(United States)
G	88	Radovan Đoković (X)	26 – 26 March 1996	1.98 m (6 ft 6 in)	Borac Čačak	(Serbia)

Head coach

- (Serbia) Svetislav Pešić

Assistant coach(es)

- (Serbia) Oliver Kostić
- (Serbia) Marko Marinović
- (Serbia) Nenad Trunić

Legend

- (C) Team captain
- (DC) Deputy captain
- (X) Unavailable for
  upcoming games
- Club – describes club
  on 25 August 2022
- Age – describes age
  on 25 August 2022

=== Depth chart per window ===
- The 12-man roster members without playing time are in Italics.

==== First window ====
The following is the first window depth chart for the matches on 25 to 29 November 2021 against Latvia and Belgium.

Pos.	Starting 5	Bench 1	Bench 2
C	Dušan Ristić	Filip Petrušev	Balša Koprivica
PF	Marko Jagodić-Kuridža	Alen Smailagić
SF	Aleksa Radanov	Nemanja Dangubić	Nikola Jović
SG	Uroš Trifunović	Rade Zagorac
PG	Aleksa Avramović	Miloš Teodosić	Jovan Novak

Other 17-man roster members, guards Aleksa Uskoković, Nikola Rebić, Nikola Đurišić, forward Dalibor Ilić and center Dragan Apić, were out of the final 12-man roster for both games.

==== Second window ====
The following is the second window depth chart for the matches on 25 to 28 February 2022 against Slovakia.

Pos.	Starting 5	Bench 1	Bench 2
C	Dušan Ristić	Balša Koprivica	Filip Petrušev
PF	Marko Jagodić-Kuridža	Boriša Simanić
SF	Aleksa Radanov	Nikola Jović
SG	Uroš Trifunović	Nikola Đurišić	Radovan Đoković
PG	Aleksa Avramović	Jovan Novak	Aleksa Uskoković

Other 24-man roster members, guards Nemanja Nedović, Vasilije Micić, Ognjen Dobrić, forwards Dejan Davidovac, Nemanja Dangubić, Rade Zagorac, Alen Smailagić, Dejan Todorović, Dušan Beslać, Dalibor Ilić, and center Dragan Apić, were out of the final 12-man roster for both games.

==== Third window ====
The following is the third window depth chart for the matches on 30 June to 3 July 2022 against Latvia and Belgium.

Pos.	Starting 5	Bench 1	Bench 2
C	Boban Marjanović	Filip Petrušev	Dušan Ristić
PF	Nemanja Bjelica	Boriša Simanić	Marko Jagodić-Kuridža
SF	Nemanja Dangubić	Dejan Davidovac
SG	Vanja Marinković	Dejan Todorović
PG	Aleksa Avramović	Ognjen Jaramaz	Aleksa Uskoković

Other 20-man roster members, guards Miloš Teodosić and Uroš Trifunović, forwards Nemanja Jović, Danilo Anđušić, Aleksa Novaković, and centers Balša Koprivica and Marko Pecarski, were out of the final 12-man roster for both games.

==== Fourth window ====
The following is the fourth window depth chart for the matches on 25–28 August 2022 against Greece and Turkey.

Pos.	Starting 5	Bench 1	Bench 2
C	Nikola Jokić	Nikola Milutinov	Dušan Ristić
PF	Vladimir Lučić	Marko Jagodić-Kuridža	Filip Petrušev
SF	Nikola Kalinić	Ognjen Dobrić	Dejan Davidovac
SG	Vanja Marinković	Marko Gudurić
PG	Vasilije Micić	Ognjen Jaramaz

Other 16-man roster members, guard Nemanja Nedović, and forwards Boriša Simanić and Nemanja Bjelica were out of the final 12-man roster for both games.

=== 2021 B-team training camp ===
On 12 October 2021, head coach Svetislav Pešić announced a 17-man b-team roster for a two day training camp. The roster was composed of players from domestic and ABA League clubs, excluding Crvena zvezda and Partizan. On 18 October, the Basketball Federation of Serbia canceled the b-team training camp due to health issues of head coach Pešić. The B-team roster included: Mihailo Petrović, Ilija Đoković, Marko Pecarski, Aleksa Radanov, Dalibor Ilić, Stefan Đorđević, Boriša Simanić, Mihailo Mušikić, Nikola Jović, Nikola Đurišić, Matija Belić, Vojin Medarević, Dušan Beslać, Marko Pavićević, Arijan Lakić, Zoran Paunović, and Đorđe Pažin.

== Staff ==
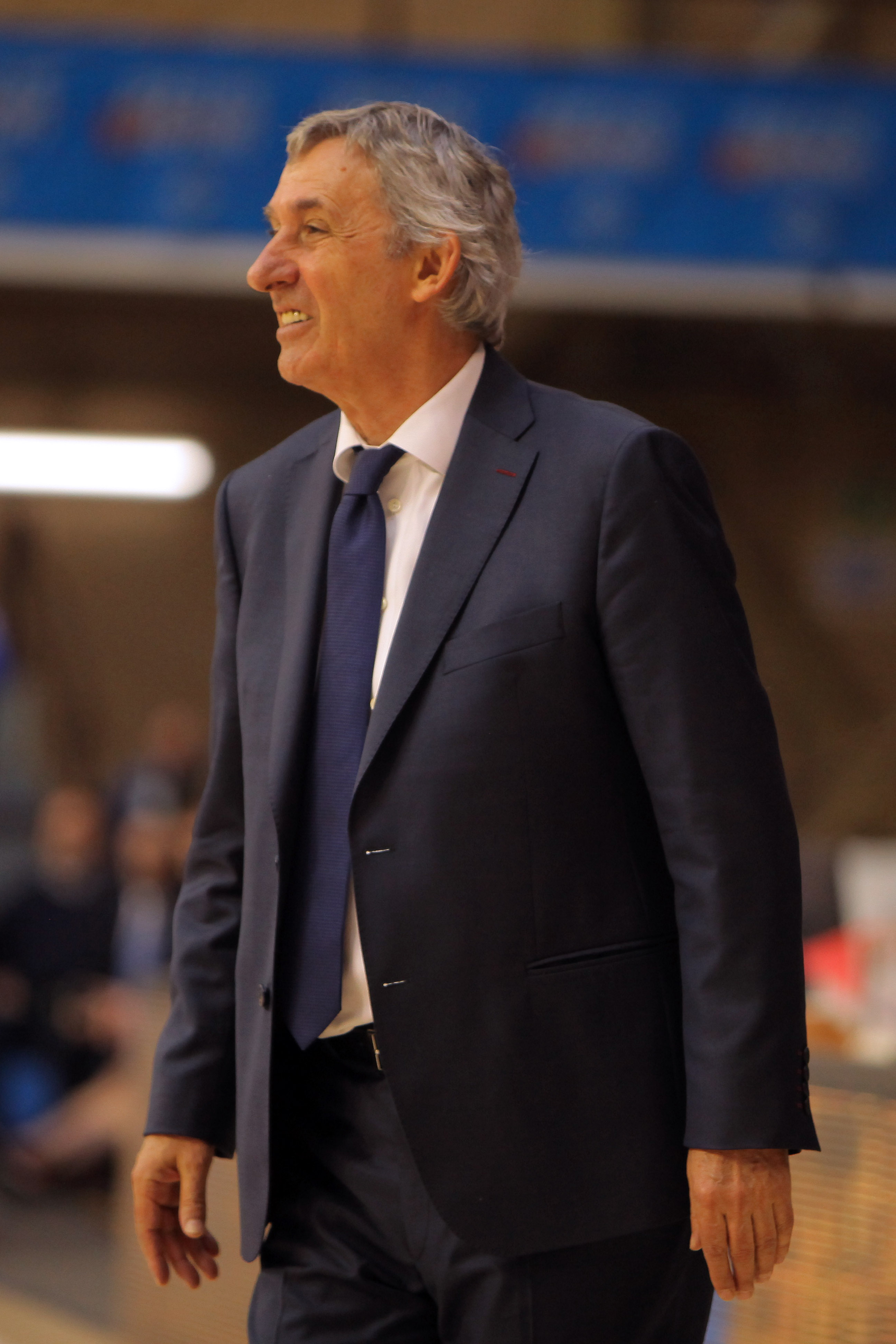
Svetislav Pešić was hired as the new head coach.

After he got appointed as an assistant coach for the Dallas Mavericks, head coach Igor Kokoškov parted ways with the Basketball Federation of Serbia as the Serbian team coach on 14 September 2021. On 28 September, the Federation hired Svetislav Pešić as the new head coach for the Serbia men's national team. On the next day, the Federation hired Dragan Tarlać as the new national team director. In November 2021, Oliver Kostić, Marko Marinović, and Nenad Trunić were named assistant coaches. In February 2022, head coach Pešić added assistant coach Vladimir Jovanović, scout Miloš Isakov Kovačević, and physiotherapist Đorđe Milošević to his staff.

Position	Staff Member	Age	Affiliated Club (Note: Describes club on 25 November 2021.)
Head coach	Svetislav Pešić	72	None
Assistant coaches	Oliver Kostić	48	None
Assistant coaches	Marko Marinović	38	(Serbia) Borac Čačak
Assistant coaches	Nenad Trunić	53	None
Conditioning coach	Marko Sekulić	41	(Serbia) Mega MIS
Scout	Miloš Isakov Kovačević	32	(Serbia) Vojvodina
National team director	Dragan Tarlać	48	None
Team manager	Nebojša Ilić	53	(Serbia) Crvena zvezda mts
Physicians	Dragan Radovanović	—	None
Physicians	Milan Mirković	—	None
Physiotherapists	Dušan Sajić	—	None
Physiotherapists	Marko Sokić	—	None
Physiotherapists	Đorđe Milošević	—	(Serbia) Borac Čačak
Equipment manager	Jovica Aničić	—	None
Press officer	Ivan Ivković	—	None

Age – describes age on 25 November 2021

Source: KSS

== Uniform ==
- Supplier: Peak
- Main sponsor: Triglav
- Back sponsor: Raiffeisen Bank (below number)
- Shorts sponsor: mts

Home	Away

== Exhibition games ==
Serbia played one exhibition game in June 2022. The game was played behind closed doors without any game reports or statements given after the game.

26 June 2022

Report

Serbia	70–55	Bulgaria

Čair Sports Center, Niš

== Qualification ==
=== First round – Group A ===
As one of the 24 national teams that qualified for EuroBasket 2022, Serbia automatically qualified for the First round. Serbia was seeded in the Seed 1. The draw for the First round was held on 31 August 2021 in Mies, Switzerland. Serbia was drawn into the Group A with the Latvia, Belgium, and Slovakia. These matches was played in three windows in November 2021, February 2022, and June/July 2022 with two games played by each team in every window.

Group A is one of eight qualifiers groups of four teams. The groups will be conducted in a round-robin system, with each team playing all other teams in the respective group in home and away games. If Serbia finishes as one of the top three teams in its group, they will advance to the Second round of the FIBA Basketball World Cup qualification and will play against top three finishers of Group B, which is composed of Belarus, Great Britain, Greece, and Turkey. In February 2022, following a 3–1 record in the first four matches, Serbia secured their place in the second round of the FIBA Basketball World Cup 2023 European qualifiers.

Pos	Team	Pld	W	L	PF	PA	PD	Pts	Qualification
1	Latvia	6	5	1	475	422	+53	11	Second round (Group I)
2	Belgium	6	4	2	460	392	+68	10	Second round (Group I)
3	Serbia	6	3	3	448	439	+9	9	Second round (Group I)
4	Slovakia	6	0	6	376	506	−130	6	

Source: FIBA
Rules for classification: 1) Points; 2) Head-to-head results; 3) Points difference; 4) Points scored.

Results by round

Round	1	2	3	4	5	6
Ground	H	A	H	A	A	H
Result	W	L	W	W	L	L
Position	2	3	2	1	3	3

Last updated: 4 July 2022.
Source: Competitive matches
Ground: A = Away; H = Home; R = Rest. Result: L = Loss; W = Win; R = Rest; P = Postponed.

Win Loss

==== Latvia home game ====
25 November 2021	Serbia	101–100	Latvia	Belgrade
20:00	Scoring by quarter: 28–33, 24–23, 25–19, 24–25
	Pts: Teodosić 21; Rebs: Dangubić 6 Asts: Teodosić 9	Boxscore	Pts: Lomažs 33; Rebs: three players 3 Asts: Zoriks 5	Arena: Aleksandar Nikolić Hall; Attendance: 2,056; Referees: Marius Ciulin (ROU), Nicolás Maestre (FRA), Mehmet Şahin (TUR)
Note:

Latvian guard Rihards Lomažs scored 33 points including six of theirs 16 three-pointers, but it was still Serbia who were left celebrating at the end of a thrilling duel in the Aleksandar Nikolić Hall, Belgrade. In his debut at the Serbia's bench, Svetislav Pešić oversaw his side's 101–100 triumph sealing victory in the closing seconds to start their quest towards the 2023 FIBA Basketball World Cup. Latvia looked to be heading to a big victory as triple after triple rained down on the court in Belgrade, but the hosts stayed alive and overturned a 93–88 deficit with three minutes to go. Serbia took the lead inside the final minute and had another chance after Latvia leveled with Serbian forward Marko Jagodić-Kuridža sinking the decisive free throw for the win. Serbian guard Miloš Teodosić came off the bench with a typically instrumental performance to contribute an efficient 21 points along with 9 assists and was backed up by a string of valuable displays, including that of Aleksa Avramović, who had 17 points, 7 assists, 5 rebounds and 3 steals. The game was played at a frantic pace and both teams shot above 70-percent from inside the arc and in a game of small margins, Serbia out-rebounded their opponents 29–20 and had the edge on second chance points at 11–6. Latvia had the lead for over 25 minutes, but not when it counted as the final buzzer sounded. Plenty to build from for both sides and Serbia will be mightily relieved to get off to a winning start.

In after-game interviews, Serbian players dedicated their victory to Stevan Jelovac, a former Serbian national team player who suffered a brain hemorrhage during an AEK practice session ten days prior to the game.

==== Belgium road game ====
28 November 2021	Belgium	73–69	Serbia	Mons
15:30	Scoring by quarter: 13–21, 16–20, 25–22, 19–6
	Pts: Van Rossom 20; Rebs: Bako 11; Asts: Bako 5	Boxscore	Pts: Avramović 19; Rebs: Dangubić, Ristić 6 Asts: Teodosić 8	Arena: Mons.Arena; Attendance: 2,242; Referees: Antonio Conde (ESP), Andrei Sharapa (BLR), Lorenzo Baldini (ITA)
Note:

Forward Alen Smailagić was ruled out of the roster due to injury. He was replaced by center Filip Petrušev.

In the battle to finish the first window with a 2–0 record, it was Belgium who prevailed to overcome Serbia in a 73–69 victory for a perfect start to their 2023 FIBA Basketball World Cup European Qualifiers campaign. Belgian guard Sam Van Rossom stepped up to drain the go-ahead triple inside the final minute and added a late free throw to ice the game as Belgium produced a final flourish to take early control of Group A as the leaders. Serbia were in the ascendancy early on and moved 36–22 ahead in the second quarter and were still ahead by double-digits late in the third. There was a brief delay before the start of the fourth and Belgium resumed reinvigorated with a 12–2 start to take the lead and they would come through an exciting finish. Belgian center Ismaël Bako starred for the Belgian Lions with 14 points, 11 rebounds, 5 assists and 2 steals in an action-packed display, while Van Rossom top scored with 20 points and was clutch in the closing minutes to help secure the victory. Serbia finished 57 percent from inside the arc, but their struggles from outside amplified in the final quarter as they missed all nine attempts from three-point range and were held to 3-of-15 overall in the fourth. Two from two for Belgium is the dream opening, while Serbia were on the wrong end of another close encounter to finish the November window at 11.

==== Slovakia home game ====
25 February 2022	Serbia	75–63	Slovakia	Belgrade
20:30	Scoring by quarter: 24–18, 20–18, 18–18, 13–9
	Pts: Avramović 14; Rebs: Ristić 8 Asts: Novak 4	Boxscore	Pts: Brodziansky 23; Rebs: Fusek 10; Asts: three players 4	Arena: Aleksandar Nikolić Hall; Attendance: 3,150; Referees: Zafer Yılmaz (TUR), Thomas Bissuel (FRA), Mehmet Sahin (TUR)
Note:

Serbia dropped Slovakia to 0–3 with a 75–63 win behind Aleksa Avramović's 14 points. Forward Marko Jagodić-Kuridža scored 13, as did guard Jovan Novak.

==== Slovakia road game ====
28 February 2022	Slovakia	63–71	Serbia	Levice
18:00	Scoring by quarter: 16–26, 15–18, 22–16, 10–11
	Pts: Brodziansky 22; Rebs: Brodziansky 8 Asts: Dolezaj, Krajčovič 4	Boxscore	Pts: Avramović 24; Rebs: Ristić 8 Asts: Avramović 6	Arena: Športová hala Levice; Attendance: 1,100; Referees: Wojciech Liszka (POL), Gvidas Gedvilas (LTU), Dariusz Zapolski (POL)
Note:

Once again, Serbia did not have things all their own way as Slovakia pushed them even closer in Levice before they prevailed for a 71–63 success. Serbian guard Aleksa Avramović played a leading role with 24 points, 6 assists and 3 rebounds in 30 minutes with teenage forward Nikola Jović stepping up with a contribution of 13 points and 7 rebounds amongst the starting five. Center Dušan Ristić was the third - and final - Serbian player in double figures with 12 points on 6-of-9 shooting to go with 8 rebounds and the starting center gave deserving praise to the opposition.

==== Latvia road game ====
30 June 2022	Latvia	66–59	Serbia	Riga
19:30	Scoring by quarter: 13–12, 12–19, 21–7, 20–21
	Pts: Kurucs 13; Rebs: three players 5 Asts: Kurucs, Lomažs 6	Boxscore	Pts: Avramović 16; Rebs: Petrušev 10; Asts: three players 3	Arena: Arena Riga; Attendance: 10,065; Referees: Antonio Conde (ESP), Lorenzo Baldini (ITA), Ventsislav Velikov (BUL)
Note:

Latvia produced an impressive defensive display with a 66–55 victory over Serbia to the delight of their home fans, in Riga. While points may not have been accumulated as easily as they did in the first meeting in November, there was still little to separate the teams in a tightly contested first half. Serbia had opened up a nine-point lead at 34–25 before momentum swung in favor of Latvia with a 26–4 spell across quarters with the visitors held to just 10 points in 15 second-half minutes. Forward Artūrs Kurucs sparked the pivotal run in the third quarter with back-to-back threes for Latvia and finished with a team-high 13 points along with 4 rebounds and 6 assists in an all-round display. Latvian centers Klavs Cavars and Anžejs Pasečņiks shared 19 points and 5 blocks between them as they set the tone in the paint in the defensive effort. Serbia were held to just 59 points – their lowest total in the World Cup Qualifiers – as they shot an uncharacteristic 21-of-60 from the field. An NBA forward Nemanja Bjelica was restricted to just a solitary point and guard Aleksa Avramović was unable to add to his first-half tally of 16 points. Just what Latvia needed. If Belgium advance, as expected, then Luca Banchi's side will enter the Second Round at 2–2. Meanwhile, early concern for Serbia as they now head back home with added pressure on their reverse fixture with Belgium.

==== Belgium home game ====
The game was held in the Čair Sports Center, Niš. The game, originally scheduled for 3 July 2022 at 21:00, was postponed due to a lighting issue with just three minutes played and Belgium leading 6–3, and rescheduled to 4 July 2022 at 19:00. The game was resumed with 7:54 to play in the first quarter and the score of 6–3 in favor of Belgium.

4 July 2022	Serbia	73–74	Belgium	Niš
19:00	Scoring by quarter: 21–23, 17–15, 22–15, 13–21
	Pts: Marinković 14; Rebs: Marjanović 10; Asts: Jaramaz 4	Boxscore	Pts: Bako 17; Rebs: Bako 6 Asts: Obasohan 6	Arena: Čair Sports Center; Attendance: 4,800; Referees: Yohan Rosso (FRA), Thomas Bissuel (FRA), Péter Praksch (HUN)
Note: The game, originally scheduled for 3 July 2022, was postponed due to a lighting issue with just three minutes played and Belgium leading 6 to 3. The remainder of the match was played on 4 July 2022.

Serbia and Belgium started their duel on Sunday, and saw it finish more than 24 hours later on Monday. Serbia held a 10-point lead with just four minutes left to play, but they learned a lesson about a typical Dario Gjergja-coached team, be it on national team level or on the club level. His teams are stubborn. If Gjergja is on the sideline, don't expect the white towel at any point. Guard Manu Lecomte came up big in the clutch minutes. At 71–61 from Serbia's point of view, the Belgian comeback started with a Hans Vanwijn layup. Forward Maxime De Zeeuw knocked down a triple on the next offense. Lecomte added another one two possessions later. Lecomte got an and-one to complete the 11–0 run which got Belgium the lead heading into the last 120 seconds of the game. Serbia did briefly retake the lead on Ognjen Jaramaz's free throws. But with the game on the line, Lecomte get the game-winning layup to set the final score at 74–73 about 26 hours after the tip-off.

=== Second round – Group I ===
In February 2022, following a 3–1 record in the first four matches, Serbia secured their place in the second round of the FIBA Basketball World Cup 2023 European qualifiers. They play against top three finishers of Group B, Great Britain, Greece, and Turkey. In March 2022, the fourth contestant of Group B, Belarus was expelled from the competition following the Russian invasion of Ukraine. As only three teams played in the Group B, after the disqualification of Belarus, the result of the qualified teams from Group A against the last-placed team will not be carried over. Following two losses in August 2022, Serbia advanced to the second round with a 1–3 record.

Pos	Team	Pld	W	L	PF	PA	PD	Pts	Qualification
1	Latvia	10	9	1	807	707	+100	19	2023 FIBA Basketball World Cup
2	Serbia	10	6	4	825	803	+22	16 (Note: Serbia 192–191 Greece)	2023 FIBA Basketball World Cup
3	Greece	10	6	4	775	764	+11	16	2023 FIBA Basketball World Cup
4	Turkey	10	4	6	782	742	+40	14 (Note: Turkey 2–0 Belgium)	
5	Belgium	10	4	6	679	717	−38	14	
6	Great Britain	10	1	9	697	832	−135	11	

Source: FIBA
Rules for classification: 1) Points; 2) Head-to-head results; 3) Points difference; 4) Points scored.
Notes:

Results by round

Round	1	2	3	4	5	6
Ground	H	A	A	H	A	H
Result	W	W	W	W	L	W
Position	4	4	2	2	2	2

Last updated: 27 February 2023.
Source: Competitive matches
Ground: A = Away; H = Home; R = Rest. Result: L = Loss; W = Win; R = Rest; P = Postponed.

Win Loss

==== Greece home game ====
25 August 2022	Serbia	100–94(OT)	Greece	Belgrade
20:00	Scoring by quarter: 31–25, 20–19, 19–19, 17–24, Overtime: 13–7
	Pts: Jokić 29; Rebs: Jokić 8 Asts: Kalinić 7	Boxscore	Pts: G. Antetokounmpo 40; Rebs: G. Antetokounmpo 8 Asts: Calathes 8	Arena: Štark Arena; Attendance: 19,150; Referees: Manuel Mazzoni (ITA), Wojciech Liszka (POL), Luis Castillo (ESP)

Serbia got their bid to reach next year's FIBA Basketball World Cup back on track with an important 100–94 overtime triumph against Greece in front of a European Qualifiers record crowd of 19,150. In a battle of two recent back-to-back NBA Most Valuable Players, it was Serbian center Nikola Jokić who prevailed over Greek forward Giannis Antetokounmpo as bottom beat top to open up Group I in the Second Round. Serbia had the lead for 41–23 of an enthralling contest, while Greece were only ahead for just over a minute. The depth for the hosts told with 33 points off the bench as they needed important contributions following an injury to Serbian guard Vasilije Micić, who had started well. The Serbians had been ahead for the majority of the contest and moved up by 10 in the fourth before Greece rallied to make it a one-possession game. Serbia made some big shots, but Greek guard Tyler Dorsey tied the game with a corner triple to force overtime. It was Serbia who made the first move in the extra period and this time, they were able to close it out. Jokić paced Serbia with 29 points, 8 rebounds and 6 assists in the win, but there was a telling contribution off the bench from guard Ognjen Jaramaz: 15 points on 6-of-8 shooting including a huge three down the stretch in regulation. It was enough to fend off Giannis' European Qualifiers record-breaking effort of 40 points along with 8 boards and 5 assists. The Jokic-Giannis battle was epic and attention quickly turns to Sunday's games with Serbia visiting Turkey with the chance to move into the top three.

==== Turkey away game ====
28 August 2022	Turkey	72–79	Serbia	Istanbul
19:00	Scoring by quarter: 11–26, 17–21, 27–18, 17–14
	Pts: Osman 22; Rebs: Şengün 13; Asts: Larkin 9	Boxscore	Pts: Jokić 24; Rebs: Jokić 10; Asts: Micić 7	Arena: Sinan Erdem Dome; Attendance: 15,556; Referees: Antonio Conde (ESP), Martin Horozov (BUL), Michał Proc (POL)

Serbia produced a near flawless first half as they led by 19 points as Serbian forward Nikola Kalinić beat the buzzer from inside his own half. However, Turkey rallied through their star trio of Cedi Osman, Furkan Korkmaz, and Alperen Şengün as they eventually tied the game at 72–72. Kalinić responded with a huge triple before a later offensive putback from Serbian center Nikola Jokić put the finishing touches on the win. Jokić made it look easy at times and put together a clinic in the paint with 19 points on 8-of-10 shooting in just 11 minutes of action in the first half. It was a slightly different story after the break as Jokić mostly sat on the bench watching Serbia's huge lead evaporate, but came up with an important score late on to finish with 24 points and 10 rebounds. There were also telling contributions from Kalinić and guard Marko Gudurić. Turkey's starters combined for 65 of their 72 points but ran out of steam down the stretch after a huge effort in the second half. The hosts were down at 27 percent from three-point range and it was Serbia who made the big shots count in the final two minutes of the game. Serbia scored the final seven points of the game to fend off an epic fightback from Turkey and win 79–72 on the road. The Serbians managed to prevent another famous sporting comeback in Istanbul to complete a perfect window having seen a lead as large as 21 points wiped out in the second half. The August window was bordering on make-or-break for Serbia with huge games with Greece and Turkey – they've beaten them both and reignited their campaign to move back to .500. In contrast, back-to-back defeats for Turkey dent their hopes of making it to the World Cup with a 2-4 record with the reverse fixture taking place in the next window in November.

==== Great Britain away game ====
11 November 2022	Great Britain	68–74	Serbia	Newcastle
19:00	Scoring by quarter: 20–21, 14–17, 17–19, 17–17
	Pts: Olaseni 20; Rebs: Olaseni, Williams 7 Asts: Nelson 9	Boxscore	Pts: Ristić 15; Rebs: Ristić 11; Asts: Jaramaz 5	Arena: Vertu Motors Arena; Attendance: 2,003; Referees: Marius Ciulin (ROU), Fernando Calatrava (ESP), Gintaras Mačiulis (LTU)

==== Turkey home game ====
14 November 2022	Serbia	77–76	Turkey	Belgrade
20:00	Scoring by quarter: 24–21, 13–13, 17–20, 23–22
	Pts: Gudurić 18; Rebs: Lučić 7 Asts: Jaramaz, Jović 5	Boxscore	Pts: Wilbekin 22; Rebs: Bitim 5 Asts: Wilbekin 3	Arena: Aleksandar Nikolić Hall; Attendance: 6,100; Referees: Yohan Rosso (FRA), Saverio Lanzarini (ITA), Luis Castillo (ESP)

==== Greece away game ====
24 February 2023	Greece	97–92(OT)	Serbia
	Scoring by quarter: 8–15, 22–24, 25–23, 25–18, Overtime: 17–12
	Pts: Rogkavopoulos 28; Rebs: Chougkaz 5 Asts: Moraitis 5	Boxscore	Pts: Milutinov 24; Rebs: Milutinov 9 Asts: Jović 8	Attendance: 7,101; Referees: Antonio Conde (ESP), Luis Castillo (ESP), Paulo Marques (POR)

==== Great Britain home game ====
27 February 2023	Serbia	101–83	Great Britain	Belgrade
20:00	Scoring by quarter: 28–20, 18–21, 28–19, 27–23
	Pts: Avramović 20; Rebs: Ristić 6 Asts: Jović 7	Boxscore	Pts: Ellis 22; Rebs: Menzies 6 Asts: Wheatle 4	Arena: Aleksandar Nikolić Hall; Attendance: 6,850; Referees: Manuel Mazzoni (ITA), Fernando Calatrava (ESP), Beniamino Attard (ITA)

== Awards ==
Gamedays First Team

Gameday	Player	PIR	Ref.
1	Miloš Teodosić	27	
7	Nikola Jokić	28	

== Statistics ==
=== Player statistics ===
Legend
GP	Games played	GS	Games started	MPG	Minutes per game
FG%	Field-goal percentage	3FG%	3-point field-goal percentage	FT%	Free-throw percentage
RPG	Rebounds per game	APG	Assists per game	SPG	Steals per game
BPG	Blocks per game	PPG	Points per game	EF	PIR per game

Player	GP	GS	MPG	FG%	3FG%	FT%	RPG	APG	SPG	BPG	PPG	EF
Danilo Anđušić	2	0	20.8	.667	.010	.750	4.0	2.5	1.5	0.0	7.0	7.5
Aleksa Avramović	6	5	27.4	.550	.405	.923	2.2	3.8	2.5	0.3	16.8	17.3
Nemanja Bjelica	2	2	23.3	.500	.200	.600	4.0	2.5	0.5	0.0	6.5	5.0
Nemanja Dangubić	4	2	19.3	.333	.333	.750	4.5	0.3	0.3	0.0	4.5	5.8
Dejan Davidovac	3	0	17.5	1.000	.250	.500	3.7	1.3	1.0	0.0	4.0	8.7
Ognjen Dobrić	3	0	10.8	.333	.400	.500	2.7	0.3	0.7	0.0	4.0	4.3
Radovan Đoković	0	0	0.0	.000	.000	.000	0.0	0.0	0.0	0.0	0.0	0.0
Nikola Đurišić	2	0	13.4	.250	.333	.000	3.0	1.0	1.5	0.0	3.5	4.5
Marko Gudurić	3	1	24.4	.636	.364	1.000	1.3	4.3	0.3	0.0	12.3	14.3
Marko Jagodić-Kuridža	9	5	18.6	.571	.455	.700	3.2	1.0	0.3	0.1	5.9	7.1
Ognjen Jaramaz	6	1	18.8	.471	.333	.875	1.5	2.5	1.0	0.0	6.3	5.8
Marko Jeremić	1	1	14.6	.000	.167	.000	3.0	1.0	0.0	0.0	3.0	–2.0
Nikola Jokić	2	2	27.5	.655	.667	.600	9.0	3.0	1.0	0.0	26.5	26.5
Nikola Jović	2	1	14.8	.500	1.000	1.000	3.5	1.5	0.0	0.0	6.5	10.0
Nikola Kalinić	2	2	37.3	.429	.400	1.000	6.0	4.0	1.5	0.0	10.0	14.0
Balša Koprivica	1	1	16.6	.800	.000	.000	5.0	0.0	0.0	4.0	8.0	16.0
Vladimir Lučić	3	3	31.6	.444	.308	.867	4.3	2.0	1.3	0.3	11.0	13.0
Vanja Marinković	4	4	23.5	.400	.353	.833	1.8	2.0	0.8	0.0	8.8	6.8
Boban Marjanović	2	1	14.6	.444	.000	.600	7.0	0.0	0.0	0.0	5.5	7.5
Vasilije Micić	2	2	21.0	.400	.400	.667	2.0	5.0	1.5	0.0	7.0	10.5
Nikola Milutinov	2	2	15.0	.500	.000	.800	3.5	0.0	0.5	0.5	8.0	9.0
Luka Mitrović	2	0	17.9	.625	.000	.625	1.0	1.0	0.0	0.5	7.5	5.5
Jovan Novak	3	0	11.4	.333	.000	.000	2.0	1.7	0.3	0.0	0.7	2.7
Filip Petrušev	3	1	17.3	.400	.000	.778	5.0	1.0	0.3	1.0	6.3	7.7
Aleksa Radanov	6	5	20.0	.588	.000	.750	2.3	0.8	0.8	0.5	4.3	5.3
Dušan Ristić	8	4	19.0	.545	.857	.600	5.5	0.6	0.1	0.3	10.1	12.6
Boriša Simanić	4	0	18.0	.450	.357	.500	3.5	0.8	0.5	0.5	6.5	7.3
Alen Smailagić	1	1	25.2	.667	.667	.250	2.0	3.0	1.0	0.0	15.0	14.0
Miloš Teodosić	2	0	26.3	.636	.455	1.000	2.0	8.5	0.0	0.5	17.5	19.5
Dejan Todorović	2	0	14.5	.500	.600	.000	2.0	0.0	0.0	0.0	5.5	4.5
Uroš Trifunović	5	4	20.3	.308	.375	.000	1.4	1.2	0.8	0.2	5.2	4.2
Aleksa Uskoković	0	0	0.0	.000	.000	.000	0.0	0.0	0.0	0.0	0.0	0.0
Rade Zagorac	2	0	13.6	.333	.200	.000	1.5	0.5	0.5	0.0	2.5	2.0
Total	10	10	202.5	.511	.369	.741	36.0	17.8	7.2	2.2	77.8	87.6

Last updated: 14 November 2022.
Source: 2023 FIBA Basketball World Cup qualification

== See also ==
- 2023 FIBA Basketball World Cup qualification (Europe)
- 2023 FIBA Basketball World Cup qualification
- 2023 FIBA Basketball World Cup
- Italy team for FIBA World Cup 2023 qualification
