= Lovro Gnjidić =

Croatian basketball player (born 2001)

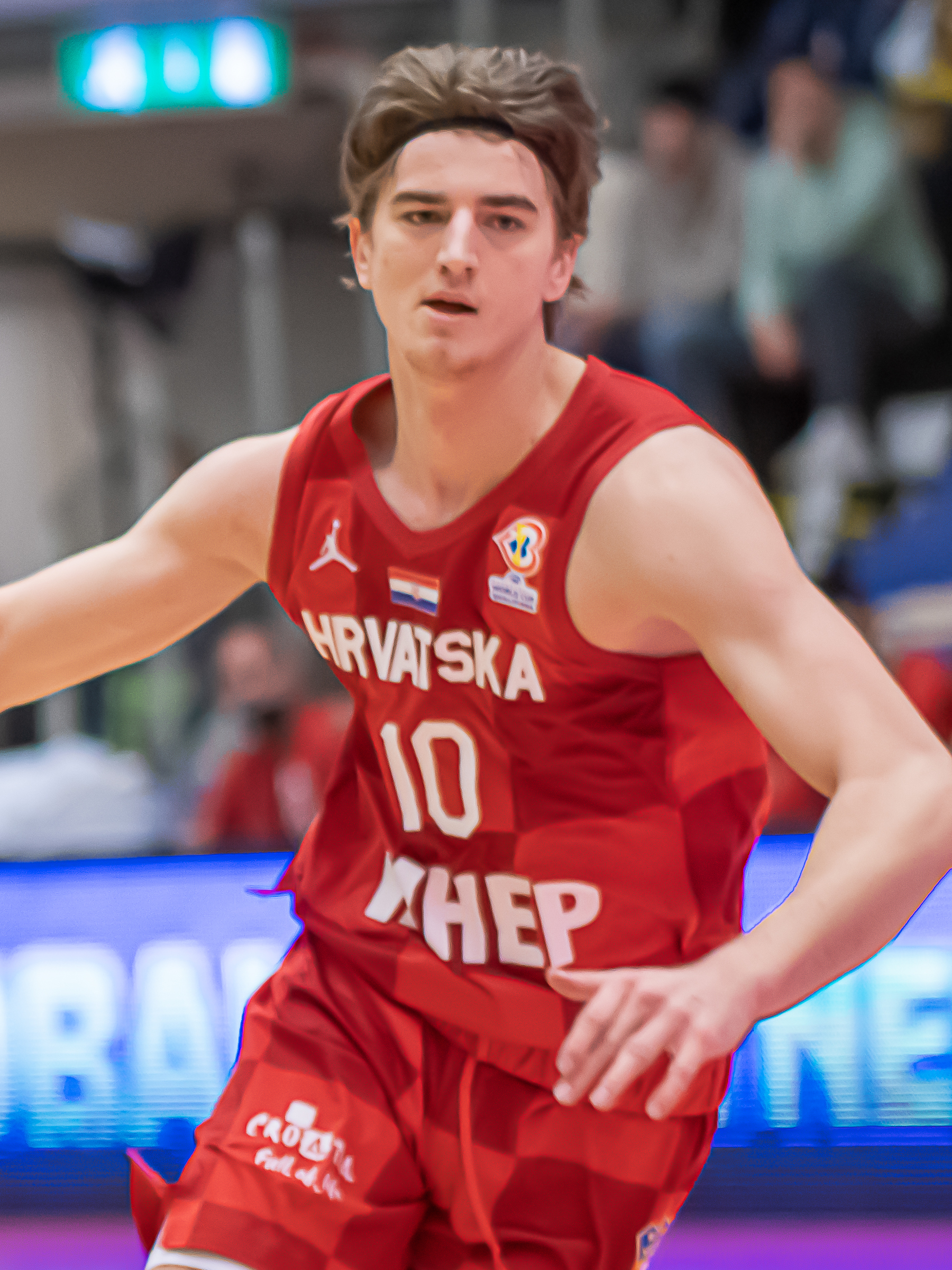
- Lovro Gnjidić in 2022

No. 19 – Cibona
- Position: Point guard
- League: Croatian Basketball League

Personal information
- Born: 18 April 2001 (age 25) Zagreb, Croatia
- Listed height: 198 cm (6 ft 6 in)

Career information
- Playing career: 2020–present

Career history
- 2020–2022: Cibona
- 2022–2023: Cedevita Olimpija
- 2023: Split
- 2023–2024: Mega MIS
- 2024–2025: Cedevita Olimpija
- 2025: Zunder Palencia
- 2025–2026: Dubrava
- 2026-present: Cibona Zagreb

Career highlights
- Croatian League champion (2022); Slovenian League champion (2023); Croatian Cup winner (2022); 2× Slovenian Cup winner (2023, 2025); Junior ABA League champion (2019)

Lovro Gnjidić (born April 18, 2001) is a Croatian professional basketball player currently playing for Cibona Zagreb in the Croatian Basketball League. Standing at 1.98 m, he plays at the point guard position.

== Professional career ==
Gnjidić grew up in the youth system of Cibona, where he also started his professional career. In the 2020–21 season, after the first choice point guard Scottie Reynolds was sidelined due to injury, Gnjidić unexpectedly got much more time on court. His good plays attracted the attention of the Montenegrin Mornar Bar, which tried to sign him during the Summer of 2021. After a lot of rumour and press reports of his transfer, he eventually decided to stay in Cibona.

In April 2022, Gnjidić declared for the 2022 NBA draft. Later, he withdrawn his name from consideration for the 2022 NBA draft.

In July 2022, after winning the Croatian League and Croatian Cup with Cibona, he signed a two-year contract with the Slovenian Cedevita Olimpija.

In September 2023, Gnjidić signed for Split. After spending only half of the 2023–24 season there, in the last days of 2023, he signed with Mega of the Serbian League and the ABA League.

== National team career ==
Gnjidić played for the Croatian national basketball team youth selections. He was part of the teams that competed at the 2018 FIBA Under-17 Basketball World Cup, 2018 FIBA U18 European Championship, 2019 FIBA U18 European Championship and 2021 FIBA U20 European Challengers.

Gnjidić debuted for the Croatian A team in November 2021 at the 2023 FIBA Basketball World Cup qualification game against Slovenia. Croatia was eliminated after the first round of qualification. In the last decisive match against Finland in July 2022, Croatia failed to hold a 5-point lead a minute before the end of the match with Gnjidić missing all four of his penalty shots in the last minute.

== Personal life ==
Gnjidić was brought up in a basketball family. His mother Lidija and father Boris were both professional basketball players.
