= Junior ABA League MVP =

Junior basketball award for former Yugoslavia countries

The Junior ABA League MVP award, also known as the Adriatic League U-19 MVP award, is an annual award that is given to the most valuable player of the European regional Adriatic Junior ABA League, which is the young top-tier level professional basketball league for countries of the former Yugoslavia. The award has been given since the 2017–18 Junior ABA League season.

== Winners ==
Season	MVP	U19 Team	Ref.
2017–18	(Georgia (country)) Goga Bitadze	(Serbia) Mega Bemax	
2018–19	(Croatia) Roko Prkačin	(Croatia) Cibona	
2019–20	Season canceled		
2020–21	(Serbia) Nikola Jović	(Serbia) Mega Soccerbet	
2021–22	(Montenegro) Andrija Grbović	(Serbia) Mega Mozzart	

== See also ==
- Junior ABA League Ideal Starting Five
