= Junior ABA League Ideal Starting Five =

The Junior ABA League Ideal Starting Five, also known as the All-Junior ABA League Team, is an honor which is given to the best five players of a given Junior ABA League season.

== Teams ==
Player (X)	Denotes the number of times the player has been selected
**Bold**	Indicates the player who won the Most Valuable Player Award in the same year

Season	Pos.	Player	U19 Team	Ref.
2017–18	PF	(Serbia) Dalibor Ilić	(Bosnia and Herzegovina) Igokea	
2017–18	PG	(Montenegro) Andrija Slavković	(Montenegro) Budućnost VOLI	
2017–18	SG	(Serbia) Zoran Paunović	(Serbia) Crvena zvezda	
2017–18	SF	(Serbia) Andrija Marjanović	(Serbia) Mega Bemax	
2017–18	C	(Georgia (country)) **Goga Bitadze**	(Serbia) Mega Bemax	
2018–19	PG	(Croatia) Sandro Rašić	(Croatia) Cibona	
2018–19	SG	(Slovenia) Rok Radović	(Croatia) Cedevita	
2018–19	SF	(Serbia) Dalibor Ilić (2)	(Bosnia and Herzegovina) Igokea	
2018–19	PF	(Montenegro) Bojan Tomašević	(Serbia) Crvena zvezda	
2018–19	C	(Croatia) **Roko Prkačin**	(Croatia) Cibona	
2019–20	**Season canceled**			
2020–21
2020–21	SG	(Serbia) Nikola Đurišić	(Serbia) Mega Soccerbet	
2020–21	SG	(Serbia) **Nikola Jović**	(Serbia) Mega Soccerbet	
2020–21	PF	(Serbia) Petar Kovačević	(Serbia) Mega Soccerbet	
2020–21	PF	(Bosnia and Herzegovina) Vuk Bošković	(Bosnia and Herzegovina) Igokea	
2020–21	PF	(Croatia) Tomislav Ivišić	(Montenegro) Budućnost VOLI	
2021–22
2021–22	SG	(Serbia) Nikola Jović (2)	(Serbia) Mega Mozzart	
2021–22	F	(Montenegro) **Andrija Grbović**	(Serbia) Mega Mozzart	
2021–22	PF	(Slovenia) Saša Ciani	(Slovenia) Cedevita Olimpija	
2021–22	PF	(Bosnia and Herzegovina) Vuk Bošković (2)	(Bosnia and Herzegovina) Igokea	
2021–22	PF	(Croatia) Tomislav Ivišić (2)	(Montenegro) SC Derby	

== See also ==
- Junior ABA League MVP
