= Bojan Đerić =

Serbian basketball coach

Crvena zvezda Meridianbet
- Position: U19 Assistant Coach

Personal information
- Born: 2 February 1982 (age 44) Belgrade, SR Serbia, Yugoslavia
- Coaching career: 2006–present

Career history

Coaching
- 2006–2011: FMP Železnik Youth
- 2011–2017: College Belgrade HS
- 2017–2020: Crvena zvezda Youth
- 2020–2021: FMP
- 2021: FMP (assistant)
- 2022–present: Crvena zvezda U19 (assistant)

Career highlights
- 2× Serbian Junior Basketball league champion (2018, 2019); 2× Euroleague NGT champion (2008, 2009)

Bojan Đerić (Serbian Cyrillic: Бојан Ђерић; born 2 February 1982) is a Serbian professional basketball coach who is an assistant coach for Crvena zvezda U19.

== Coaching career ==
In 2006, Đerić stated his coaching career in youth system of FMP Železnik. He won two Euroleague Next Generation Tournaments with their under-18 team. In 2011, Đerić became a high school coach for the First Sports Basketball High School – College Belgrade.

With the Crvena zvezda U19 team, Đerić lost two finals of the Junior ABA League, in 2018 and 2019. In the 2019 Final, his team had a 73–63 loss to Cibona U19.

On 13 December 2020, FMP hired Đerić as their interim head coach. In his official head coaching debut in the ABA on 15 December, Đerić led FMP to a 99–89 overtime loss to Zadar. He finished his stint as the interim head coach with a 3–5 record on 13 February 2021, becoming an assistant coach to new FMP head coach Vanja Guša. On 17 August 2022, Crvena zvezda hired Đerić as their new assistant coach for the under-19 team.
