= Oleksandr Kobzystyi =

Ukrainian basketball player (born 2003)

Personal information
- Born: 23 May 2003 (age 23) Poltava Oblast, Ukraine
- Listed height: 2.01 m (6 ft 7 in)
- Listed weight: 102 kg (225 lb)

Career information
- College: Oregon (2024–2026)
- Position: Shooting guard / small forward

Career history
- 2021–2024: →Mega Basket

Career highlights
- 2× Junior ABA League champion (2021, 2022)

Oleksandr Viktorovich Kobzystyi (Ukrainian: Олександр Вікторович Кобзистий; born 23 May 2003) is a Ukrainian basketball player.

== Early life and career ==
Kobzystyi moved to Belgrade, Serbia, in 2019, joining the Mega Basket youth system. He was a member of the Mega U19 rosters that won the Junior ABA League for the 2020–21 and 2021–22 season.

== Career ==
On 28 May 2021, Kobzystyi signed with Mega Basket. In the 2021–22 BLS season, he was load out to OKK Beograd, the Mega Basket affiliate. Over 29 games, he averaged 10.7 points, 4.9 rebounds, and 1.2 assists per game. After the season, he returned to Mega Basket for the 2022–23 season. After Kobzystyi finished the season in mega, he signed a contract with University of Oregon also known as Ducks

== National team career ==
In August 2019, Kobzystyi was a member of the Ukraine U16 national team at the FIBA U16 European Championship Division B in Podgorica, Montenegro. Over eight tournament games, he averaged 21.8 points, 8.6 rebounds, and 2.6 assists per game.

In July 2021, Kobzystyi was a member of the Ukraine under-20 team at the FIBA U20 European Challengers. Over five tournament games, he averaged 12 points, 3.8 rebounds, and 0.6 assists per game. In July 2022, Kobzystyi was a member of the under-20 team that finished last at the FIBA U20 European Championship in Podgorica, Montenegro. Over seven tournament games, he averaged 14.9 points, 6.1 rebounds, and 1.3 assists per game.

== Personal life ==
His father is a former basketball player Viktor Kobzystyy. His father played for Mariupol, Budivelnyk, and Dnipro during his playing days, as well as in Bulgaria and Russia. Also, his father was a member of the Ukraine national team at two EuroBaskets, 2001 and 2005.

== See also ==
- List of foreign basketball players in Serbia
