= 2020–21 Junior ABA League =

2021 Junior ABA League
Tournament details
- City: Čajetina
- Dates: 21–24 May 2021
- Season: 2020–21
- Teams: 8

Final positions
- Champions: (Serbia) Mega Soccerbet U19 (2nd title)
- Runners-up: (Montenegro) Budućnost VOLI U19
- Third place: (Bosnia and Herzegovina) Igokea U19
- Fourth place: (Serbia) Sloboda Užice U19

Awards
- Best player: (Serbia) Nikola Jović

The 2020–21 Junior ABA League was the fourth season of the Junior ABA League with eight men's under-19 teams from Bosnia and Herzegovina, Montenegro, and Serbia. Teams are the under-19 selections of the ABA League teams. The season will a single-elimination tournament held in Čajetina, Serbia from 21–24 May 2021.

Mega Soccerbet U19 won its second Junior ABA League title defeating Budućnost VOLI U19 in the final. Guard Nikola Jović was named the Junior ABA League MVP award.

== Teams ==
A total of 8 teams contested the league, excluding representatives from Croatia, North Macedonia, and Slovenia.

=== Team allocation ===
Location of teams in the 2020–21 Junior ABA League

Quarterfinals
(Bosnia and Herzegovina) Igokea U19	(Montenegro) Podgorica U19	(Serbia) Crvena zvezda mts U19	(Serbia) Partizan NIS U19
(Montenegro) Budućnost VOLI U19	(Serbia) Borac Čačak U19	(Serbia) Mega Soccerbet U19	(Serbia) Sloboda Užice U19

=== Locations and personnel ===
Team	Home city	Head coach	Captain
Budućnost VOLI U19	Podgorica	(Montenegro) Miloš Radović	
Borac Čačak U19	Čačak	(Serbia) Miloš Pejanović	
Crvena zvezda mts U19	Belgrade	(Serbia) Miloš Obrenović	
Igokea U19	Aleksandrovac	(Bosnia and Herzegovina) Slobodan Kecman	
Mega Soccerbet U19	Belgrade	(Serbia) Dragoljub Avramović	
Partizan NIS U19	Belgrade	(Serbia) Milivoje Lazić	
Podgorica U19	Podgorica	(Montenegro) Radojica Petrić	
Sloboda Užice U19	Užice	(Serbia) Branko Knežević	

== Venue ==
The tournament will be held in Čajetina, Serbia.

Čajetina	2020–21 Junior ABA League (Yugoslavia)
Čajetina Sports Hall	2020–21 Junior ABA League (Yugoslavia)
Capacity: N/A	2020–21 Junior ABA League (Yugoslavia)

== Bracket ==
Quarterfinals
22 May
(Montenegro) Budućnost VOLI U19	102
(Montenegro) Podgorica U19	61
22 May
(Bosnia and Herzegovina) Igokea U19	94
(Serbia) Borac Čačak U19	69
22 May
(Serbia) Crvena zvezda U19	74
(Serbia) Sloboda Užice U19	85
22 May
(Serbia) Mega Soccerbet U19	87
(Serbia) Partizan NIS U19	81

Semifinals
23 May
(Montenegro) Budućnost VOLI U19	83
(Bosnia and Herzegovina) Igokea U19	56
23 May
(Serbia) Sloboda Užice U19	75
(Serbia) Mega Soccerbet U19	101

Final
24 May
(Montenegro) Budućnost VOLI U19	83
(Serbia) Mega Soccerbet U19	92
Third place
24 May
(Bosnia and Herzegovina) Igokea U19	87
(Serbia) Sloboda Užice U19	62

== Quarterfinals ==
All times are local UTC+1.

=== Crvena zvezda mts U19 v Sloboda Užice U19 ===
22 May 2021
9:00

Report

Crvena zvezda mts U19 (Serbia)	74–85	(Serbia) Sloboda Užice U19
Scoring by quarter: 28–26, 20–22, 20–18, 6–19
Pts: Nikola Manojlović 24; Rebs: Nikola Šaranović 7 Asts: Filip Branković 4		Pts: Čedomir Matić 25; Rebs: Čedomir Matić 11; Asts: Bogićević, Aksentijević 7 each

Čajetina Sports Hall, Čajetina

=== Budućnost VOLI U19 v Podgorica U19 ===
22 May 2021
11:30

Report

Budućnost VOLI U19 (Montenegro)	102–61	(Montenegro) Podgorica U19
Scoring by quarter: 31–14, 14–14, 27–20, 30–13
Pts: Danilo Ivanović 20; Rebs: Tomislav Ivišić 9 Asts: Filip Dragojević 5		Pts: Alen Malovčič 20; Rebs: Dimitrije Mališić 10; Asts: Milatović, Bulajić 3 each

Čajetina Sports Hall, Čajetina

=== Igokea U19 v Borac Čačak U19 ===
22 May 2021
14:00

Report

Igokea U19 (Bosnia and Herzegovina)	94–69	(Serbia) Borac Čačak U19
Scoring by quarter: 28–19, 24–15, 16–15, 26–20
Pts: Vuk Bošković 23; Rebs: Dejan Pavlović 7 Asts: Andrej Bojanić 8		Pts: Obućina, Janković 12 each Rebs: Stefan Janković 8 Asts: Obućina, Bačarević 4 each

Čajetina Sports Hall, Čajetina

=== Mega Soccerbet U19 v Partizan NIS U19 ===
22 May 2021
16:30

Report

Mega Soccerbet U19 (Serbia)	87–81	(Serbia) Partizan NIS U19
Scoring by quarter: 22–17, 18—20, 19–24, 28–20
Pts: Nikola Jović 21; Rebs: Petar Kovačević 12; Asts: Luka Paunović 6		Pts: Nikola Radovanović 22; Rebs: Radovanović, Petrović, Tahmaz 6 each Asts: Popović, Radovanović 3 each

Čajetina Sports Hall, Čajetina

== Semifinals ==
=== Budućnost VOLI U19 v Igokea U19 ===
23 May 2021
14:00

Report

Budućnost VOLI U19 (Montenegro)	83–56	(Bosnia and Herzegovina) Igokea U19
Scoring by quarter: 19–21, 15–11, 19–8, 30–16
Pts: Ivišić, Marinović 14 each Rebs: Lazar Radetić 6 Asts: Tomislav Ivišić 7		Pts: Vuk Bošković 23; Rebs: Vuk Bošković 9 Asts: Srđan Bošković 3

Čajetina Sports Hall, Čajetina
Referees: Stefan Ćalić, Miloš Hadžić, Ljubomir Marković

=== Sloboda Užice U19 v Mega Soccerbet U19 ===
23 May 2021
18:00

Report

Sloboda Užice U19 (Serbia)	75–101	(Serbia) Mega Soccerbet U19
Scoring by quarter: 23–23, 16–28, 15–25, 21–25
Pts: Čedomir Matić 14; Rebs: Mihailo Bošković 9 Asts: Luka Aksentijević 4		Pts: Petar Kovačević 27; Rebs: Nikola Jović 11; Asts: four players 3 each

Čajetina Sports Hall, Čajetina
Referees: Dragan Matić, Sava Ćetković, Marko Strika

== Third place game ==
24 May 2021
12:00

Report

Igokea U19 (Bosnia and Herzegovina)	87–62	(Serbia) Sloboda Užice U19
Scoring by quarter: 23–14, 31–14, 11–19, 22–15
Pts: Vuk Bošković 25; Rebs: Vuk Bošković 14; Asts: Andrej Bojanić 5		Pts: Alajbegović, Bošković 13 each Rebs: Mihailo Bošković 7 Asts: Luka Aksentijević 4

Čajetina Sports Hall, Čajetina
Referees: Dragan Matić, Marko Strika, Ljubomir Marković

== Final ==
24 May 2021
16:00

Report

Budućnost VOLI U19 (Montenegro)	83–92	(Serbia) Mega Soccerbet U19
Scoring by quarter: 20–32, 28–12, 18–26, 17–22
Pts: Eray Buyukcangaz 19; Rebs: Filip Dragojević 8 Asts: three players 2 each		Pts: Nikola Jović 25; Rebs: Nikola Jović 13; Asts: Nikola Đurišić 7

Čajetina Sports Hall, Čajetina
Referees: Stefan Ćalić, Sava Ćetković, Miloš Hadžić

Starters:			Pts	Reb	Ast
PG	5	(Montenegro) Danilo Ivanović	10	2	2
PG	9	(Montenegro) Matija Karadžić	16	3	2
SG	7	(Montenegro) Miloš Stijepović	6	0	0
PF	15	(Croatia) Tomislav Ivišić	15	6	1
PF	33	(Montenegro) Danilo Kojičić	3	0	0
Reserves:					
SG	4	(Turkey) Eray Buyukcangaz	19	2	1
SG	6	(Montenegro) Igor Joković	DNP		
C	8	(Montenegro) Lazar Radetić	0	2	0
SG	11	(Montenegro) Zoran Vučeljić	12	7	2
SF	12	(Montenegro) Filip Dragojević	0	8	1
SG	14	(Montenegro) Miljan Marinović	2	2	1
C	20	(Montenegro) Jakša Pejović	DNP		
Head coach:
(Basketball Federation of Montenegro) Miloš Radović

Budućnost	Mega Soccerbet

BUD	Statistics	MEG
16/41 (39%)	2-pt field goals	30/43 (69.8%)
13/31 (41.9%)	3-pt field goals	4/23 (17.4%)
12/22 (54.5%)	Free throws	20/28 (71.4%)
23	Offensive rebounds	33
9	Defensive rebounds	9
32	Total rebounds	42
10	Assists	25
10	Turnovers	13
6	Steals	6
1	Blocks	8
25	Fouls	19

Starters:			Pts	Reb	Ast
PG	1	(Serbia) Danilo Labović	2	1	0
SG	6	(Ukraine) Oleksandr Kobzystyi	8	2	2
G/F	11	(Serbia) Nikola Đurišić	22	4	7
G/F	5	(Serbia) Nikola Jović	25	13	5
C	33	(Serbia) Mihailo Mušikić	14	10	1
Reserves:					
PF	3	(Serbia) Radovan Kompirović	DNP		
PG	8	(Serbia) Mihailo Milutinović	DNP		
PG	10	(Serbia) Andrija Vučurović	0	1	0
SG	13	(Serbia) Luka Paunović	4	4	4
PF	19	(Serbia) Petar Kovačević	17	7	6
C	23	(Serbia) Nikola Đapa	DNP		
PF	49	(Serbia) Filip Stanojević	DNP		
Head coach:
(Basketball Federation of Serbia) Dragoljub Avramović

== Awards ==
Pos.	Player	Team	Ref.
MVP
SG	(Serbia) Nikola Jović	(Serbia) Mega Soccerbet U19	
Ideal Starting Five
SG	(Serbia) Nikola Đurišić	(Serbia) Mega Soccerbet U19	
SG	(Serbia) Nikola Jović	(Serbia) Mega Soccerbet U19	
PF	(Serbia) Petar Kovačević	(Serbia) Mega Soccerbet U19	
PF	(Bosnia and Herzegovina) Vuk Bošković	(Bosnia and Herzegovina) Igokea U19	
PF	(Croatia) Tomislav Ivišić	(Montenegro) Budućnost VOLI U19	

== See also ==
- 2020–21 Euroleague Basketball Next Generation Tournament
