= 2018–19 Junior ABA League =

Junior ABA League
- Season: 2018–19
- Dates: 29 November – 2 December 2018 (Group stage); 6–7 April 2019 (Final Four)
- Games played: 29
- Teams: 11

Regular season
- Season MVP: (Croatia) Roko Prkačin

Finals
- Champions: (Croatia) Cibona U19
- Runners-up: (Serbia) Crvena zvezda mts U19
- Third place: (Bosnia and Herzegovina) Igokea U19
- Fourth place: (Croatia) Cedevita U19
- All statistics correct as of September 22, 2018.

The 2018–19 Junior ABA League is the second season of the Junior ABA League with twelve men's under-19 teams from Serbia, Croatia, Slovenia, Montenegro and Bosnia and Herzegovina. Teams are the junior selections of the 2018–19 ABA League First Division teams.

== Competition ==
Twelve under-19 teams are participating at the 2018–19 Junior ABA League season and they are divided into two semi-final Groups. In the group stage, all teams will face each other team within a group in a round-robin system. The two best placed teams of each group will advance to the final tournament. At the final tournament, the teams will play two games – the semifinal and the final or third place game. The winner of the final tournament will become the 2018–19 ABA Junior Tournament Champion.

== Teams ==
=== Team allocation ===
Regular season
(Serbia) Crvena zvezda mts U19	(Croatia) Cedevita U19	(Montenegro) Budućnost VOLI U19	(Slovenia) Krka U19
(Serbia) Mega Bemax U19	(Croatia) Cibona U19	(Montenegro) Mornar U19	(Slovenia) Petrol Olimpija U19
(Serbia) Partizan NIS U19	(Croatia) Zadar U19	(Bosnia and Herzegovina) Igokea U19	(Serbia) ~~FMP~~ (withdraw)

=== Locations and personnel ===
Location of teams in the 2018–19 Junior ABA League

Team	Home city	Head coach	Captain
Budućnost VOLI U19	Podgorica	(Montenegro) Petar Mijović	
Cedevita U19	Zagreb	(Croatia) Marko Trninić	
Cibona U19	Zagreb	(Croatia) Ivan Juran	
Crvena zvezda mts U19	Belgrade	(Serbia) Bojan Đerić	
Igokea U19	Aleksandrovac	(Bosnia and Herzegovina) Aleksandar Ćikić	
Krka U19	Novo Mesto	(Croatia) Leon Stipaničev	
Mega Bemax U19	Sremska Mitrovica	(Serbia) Vlada Vukoičić	
Mornar U19	Bar	(Montenegro) Aleksandar Mitrović	
Partizan NIS U19	Belgrade	(Serbia) Aleksandar Bućan	
Petrol Olimpija U19	Ljubljana	(Slovenia) Žiga Mravljak	
Zadar U19	Zadar	(Croatia) Jurica Ružić	

== Group stage ==
=== Group A ===
Venue: Bar, Montenegro

Pos	Team	Pld	W	L	PF	PA	PD	Pts	Qualification	(Croatia) CED	(Bosnia and Herzegovina) IGO	(Serbia) MEG	(Slovenia) KRK	(Montenegro) MOR
1	(Croatia) Cedevita U19	4	3	1	327	290	+37	7	Advance to Final Four	—	—	66–65	87–92	94–66
2	(Bosnia and Herzegovina) Igokea U19	4	2	2	317	329	−12	6 (Note: Igokea 1–1, 1.02; Mega 1–1, 0.98; Krka 0–2)	Advance to Final Four	67–80	—	—	82–75	—
3	(Serbia) Mega Bemax U19	4	2	2	329	283	+46	6		—	85–87	—	—	—
4	(Slovenia) Krka U19	4	2	2	327	320	+7	6		—	—	80–86	—	—
5	(Montenegro) Mornar U19	4	1	3	270	348	−78	5		—	89–81	50–93	65–80	—

Source: Junior ABA League

=== Group B ===
Venue: Zadar, Croatia

Pos	Team	Pld	W	L	PF	PA	PD	Pts	Qualification	(Serbia) CZV	(Croatia) CIB	(Montenegro) BUD	(Slovenia) OLI	(Croatia) ZAD	(Serbia) PAR
1	(Serbia) Crvena zvezda mts U19	5	5	0	386	323	+63	10	Advance to Final Four	—	63–61	87–52	—	—	86–81
2	(Croatia) Cibona U19	5	3	2	366	358	+8	8 (Note: Cibona 1–0; Budućnost VOLI 0–1)	Advance to Final Four	—	—	—	64–74	87–81	71–64
3	(Montenegro) Budućnost VOLI U19	5	3	2	351	380	−29	8		—	76–83	—	—	76–74	—
4	(Slovenia) Petrol Olimpija U19	5	2	3	378	380	−2	7		66–69	—	70–79	—	—	—
5	(Croatia) Zadar U19	5	1	4	381	407	−26	6 (Note: Zadar 1–0; Partizan NIS 0–1)		63–81	—	—	81–87	—	82–76
6	(Serbia) Partizan NIS U19	5	1	4	374	388	−14	6		—	—	66–68	87–81	—	—

Source: Junior ABA League

== Final Four ==
=== Bracket ===
Venue: Slavonski Brod, Croatia

Semifinals
6 April
(Serbia) Crvena zvezda U19	73
(Bosnia and Herzegovina) Igokea U19	66
6 April
(Croatia) Cedevita U19	59
(Croatia) Cibona U19	76

Final
7 April
(Serbia) Crvena zvezda U19	68
(Croatia) Cibona U19	73
Third place
7 April
(Bosnia and Herzegovina) Igokea U19	90
(Croatia) Cedevita U19	88

Source: Junior Adriatic League

=== Semifinals ===
==== Cedevita v Cibona ====
6 April 2019
12:30

Report

Cedevita U19 (Croatia)	59–76	(Croatia) Cibona U19
Scoring by quarter: 15–22, 20–14, 10–22, 14–18
Pts: Radović 20; Rebs: Bošnjak 9 Asts: Bošnjak, Radović 3		Pts: Prkačin 26; Rebs: Prkačin 14; Asts: Paponja, Prkačin 4

Vijuš Hall, Slavonski Brod
Attendance: 1,930
Referees: Krunoslav Peić, Vladimir Vesković, Aleksandar Davidov

==== Crvena zvezda v Igokea ====
6 April 2019
15:00

Report

Crvena zvezda U19 (Serbia)	73–66	(Bosnia and Herzegovina) Igokea U19
Scoring by quarter: 24–15, 23–18, 14–17, 12–16
Pts: Vasić 18; Rebs: Popović 8 Asts: Karapandžić 5		Pts: Kondić 22; Rebs: Ilić 16; Asts: three players 2

Vijuš Hall, Slavonski Brod
Attendance: 1,100
Referees: Radoš Savović, Bojan Kruljac, Miha Mauer

=== Third place ===
7 April 2019
12:30

Report

Igokea U19 (Bosnia and Herzegovina)	90–88	(Croatia) Cedevita U19
Scoring by quarter: 26–15, 23–29, 23–14, 18–30
Pts: Ilić 32; Rebs: Ilić 17; Asts: Kondić 8		Pts: Radović 22; Rebs: Bošnjak 9 Asts: Čubrilo 6

Vijuš Hall, Slavonski Brod
Attendance: 1,150
Referees: Krunoslav Peić, Tomislav Stapić, Aleksandar Davidov

=== Final ===
7 April 2019
15:00

Report

Crvena zvezda mts U19 (Serbia)	68–73	(Croatia) Cibona U19
Scoring by quarter: 21–27, 13–18, 19–18, 15–10
Pts: Tomašević 21; Rebs: Vasić, Tomašević 8 Asts: Vasić 4		Pts: Rašić 25; Rebs: Branković, Prkačin 8 Asts: Prkačin, Gnjidić 6

Vijuš Hall, Slavonski Brod
Attendance: 1,990
Referees: Vladan Šundić, Aleksandar Milojević, Bojan Kruljac

Starters:			Pts	Reb	Ast
PG	4	(Serbia) Stevan Karapandžić	6	2	2
G	10	(Serbia) Lazar Vasić	5	8	4
G/F	8	(Serbia) Nikola Manojlović	1	5	1
PF	13	(Montenegro) Bojan Tomašević	27	8	1
C	5	(Serbia) Marko Pavićević	10	4	3
Reserves:					
G/F	6	(Serbia) Vuk Dobrašinović	0	0	0
F	7	(Serbia) Nemanja Popović	5	3	3
G/F	9	(Serbia) Dušan Radosavljević	6	7	0
PG	11	(Serbia) Vukašin Mašić	8	2	1
PF	12	(Serbia) Nikola Blagojević	0	0	0
C	14	(Serbia) Miloš Ćojbašić	0	0	0
C	15	(Serbia) Darko Kolarić	DNP		
Head coach:
(Serbia) Bojan Đerić

Crvena zvezda	Cibona

CZV	Statistics	CIB
16/34 (47%)	2-pt field goals	17/32 (53%)
8/24 (33%)	3-pt field goals	11/26 (44%)
12/21 (57%)	Free throws	6/15 (40%)
14	Offensive rebounds	5
25	Defensive rebounds	19
39	Total rebounds	24
15	Assists	19
15	Turnovers	10
5	Steals	6
1	Blocks	3
18	Fouls	25

Starters:			Pts	Reb	Ast
G	13	(Croatia) Lovro Gnjidić	2	2	6
G	7	(Croatia) Sandro Rašić	25	4	1
G	9	(Croatia) Dino Bistrović	10	2	3
F/C	8	(Croatia) Roko Prkačin	23	8	6
C	15	(Croatia) Danko Branković	4	8	3
Reserves:					
SG	4	(Croatia) Filip Paponja	3	0	0
SG	5	(Croatia) Stjepan Škara	DNP		
SG	6	(Croatia) Hrvoje Majcunić	DNP		
SG	10	(Croatia) Luka Cvitanović	0	0	0
SG	11	(Croatia) Vito Porobić	6	0	0
F	12	(Croatia) Lukša Buljević	DNP		
C	14	(Croatia) Filip Kalajžić	DNP		
Head coach:
(Croatia) Ivan Juran

== Awards ==
Pos.	Player	Team	Ref.
MVP
C	(Croatia) Roko Prkačin	(Croatia) Cibona U19	
Ideal Starting Five
PG	(Croatia) Sandro Rašić	(Croatia) Cibona U19	
SG	(Slovenia) Rok Radović	(Croatia) Cedevita U19	
SF	(Serbia) Dalibor Ilić	(Bosnia and Herzegovina) Igokea U19	
PF	(Montenegro) Bojan Tomašević	(Serbia) Crvena zvezda U19	
C	(Croatia) Roko Prkačin	(Croatia) Cibona U19	

== See also ==
- 2018–19 ABA League First Division
