= 2021–22 Junior ABA League =

Junior ABA League
- Season: 2021–22
- Dates: 25–28 November 2021 (Group stage); 28–29 April 2022 (Final Four)
- Teams: 12

Regular season
- Season MVP: (Montenegro) Andrija Grbović

Finals
- Champions: (Serbia) Mega Mozzart U19
- Runners-up: (Montenegro) SC Derby U19
- Third place: (Bosnia and Herzegovina) Igokea U19
- Fourth place: (Slovenia) Cedevita Olimpija U19
- All statistics correct as of September 22, 2022.

The 2021–22 Junior ABA League is the fifth season of the Junior ABA League with twelve men's under-19 teams from Bosnia and Herzegovina, Croatia, Montenegro, Serbia, and Slovenia. Teams were youth system rosters of the 2021–22 ABA League First Division teams.

Mega Mozzart U19 won its third Junior ABA League title defeating SC Derby U19 in the final. Forward Andrija Grbović was named the Junior ABA League MVP award.

== Teams ==
=== Team allocation ===
Regular season
(Serbia) Borac Čačak U19	(Croatia) Split U19	(Montenegro) SC Derby U19	(Slovenia) Krka U19
(Serbia) Mega Mozzart U19	(Croatia) Cibona U19	(Montenegro) Mornar Barsko zlato U19	(Slovenia) Cedevita Olimpija U19
(Serbia) Partizan NIS U19	(Croatia) Zadar U19	(Bosnia and Herzegovina) Igokea U19	(Bosnia and Herzegovina) Spars U19

=== Locations and personnel ===
Location of teams in the 2018–19 Junior ABA League

Team	Home city	Head coach	Captain
Borac Čačak U19	Čačak	(Serbia) Miloš Pejanović	
Cedevita Olimpija U19	Ljubljana	(Slovenia) Borut Fijavž	(Slovenia)
Cibona U19	Zagreb	(Croatia) Boris Džidić	
Igokea U19	Aleksandrovac	(Bosnia and Herzegovina) Slobodan Kecman	
Krka U19	Novo Mesto	(Croatia) Domen Zevnik	
Mega Mozzart U19	Sremska Mitrovica	(Serbia) Dragoljub Avramović	(Serbia) Nikola Jović
Mornar Barsko zlato U19	Bar	(Montenegro) Zoran Peruničić	
Partizan NIS U19	Belgrade	(Serbia) Đorđe Jovičić	
SC Derby U19	Podgorica	(Montenegro) Borivoje Stanišić	
Split U19	Split	(Croatia) Ante Grgurević	
Spars U19	Sarajevo	(Bosnia and Herzegovina) Marko Trbić	
Zadar U19	Zadar	(Croatia) Marko Selin	

== Group stage ==
=== Group A ===
Venue: Bar, Montenegro

Pos	Team	Pld	W	L	PF	PA	PD	Pts	Qualification
1	(Serbia) Mega Mozzart U19	5	5	0	500	338	+162	10	Advance to Final Four
2	(Slovenia) Cedevita Olimpija U19	5	3	2	395	369	+26	8	Advance to Final Four
3	(Serbia) Borac Čačak U19	5	3	2	391	365	+26	8	
4	(Bosnia and Herzegovina) Spars U19	5	3	2	447	425	+22	8	
5	(Croatia) Cibona U19	5	1	4	379	429	−50	6	
6	(Montenegro) Mornar Barsko zlato U19	5	0	5	295	481	−186	5	

Source: Junior ABA League

=== Group B ===
Venue: Laktaši, Bosnia and Herzegovina

Pos	Team	Pld	W	L	PF	PA	PD	Pts	Qualification
1	(Montenegro) SC Derby U19	5	5	0	453	339	+114	10	Advance to Final Four
2	(Bosnia and Herzegovina) Igokea m:tel U19	5	4	1	398	350	+48	9	Advance to Final Four
3	(Croatia) Zadar U19	5	3	2	390	351	+39	8	
4	(Slovenia) Krka U19	5	1	4	370	404	−34	6	
5	(Croatia) Split U19	5	1	4	341	403	−62	6	
6	(Serbia) Partizan NIS U19	5	1	4	238	343	−105	6	

Source: Junior ABA League

== Final Four ==
=== Bracket ===
Venue: Ljubljana, Slovenia

Semifinals
28 April
(Serbia) Mega Mozzart U19	97
(Bosnia and Herzegovina) Igokea m:tel U19	87
28 April
(Montenegro) SC Derby U19	87
(Slovenia) Cedevita Olimpija U19	73

Final
29 April
(Bosnia and Herzegovina) Igokea m:tel U19	85
(Slovenia) Cedevita Olimpija U19	79
Third place
29 April
(Serbia) Mega Mozzart U19	88
(Montenegro) SC Derby U19	74

Source: Junior Adriatic League

=== Semifinals ===
==== Mega Mozzart v Igokea m:tel ====
28 April 2019
16:30

Report

Mega Mozzart U19 (Serbia)	97–87	(Bosnia and Herzegovina) Igokea m:tel U19
Scoring by quarter: 19–28, 25–23, 21–14, 32–22
Pts: Nikola Jović 29; Rebs: Nikola Jović 8 Asts: Danilo Labović 6		Pts: Amsal Delalić 25; Rebs: Aleksandar Smiljanić 9 Asts: Vuk Bošković 6

Arena Stožice, Ljubljana
Attendance: 100
Referees: Bojan Kruljac, Marko Mustapić, Rok Misson

==== SC Derby v Cedevita Olimpija ====
28 April 2019
19:00

Report

SC Derby U19 (Montenegro)	87–73	(Slovenia) Cedevita Olimpija U19
Scoring by quarter: 19–13, 16–11, 31–30, 21–19
Pts: Tomislav Ivišić 19; Rebs: Zvonimir Ivišić 11; Asts: T. Ivišić, Ivanović 6		Pts: Saša Ciani 16; Rebs: Saša Ciani 12; Asts: Saša Ciani 7

Arena Stožice, Ljubljana
Attendance: 150
Referees: Krunoslav Peić, Mateo Pavičić, Hrvoje Muhvić

=== Third place ===
29 April 2019
16:00

Report

Igokea m:tel U19 (Bosnia and Herzegovina)	85–79	(Slovenia) Cedevita Olimpija U19
Scoring by quarter: 23–21, 20–23, 16–23, 26–12
Pts: Vuk Bošković 19; Rebs: Vuk Bošković 12; Asts: Amsal Delalić 5		Pts: Saša Ciani 34; Rebs: Saša Ciani 10; Asts: Lon Ličan 6

Arena Stožice, Ljubljana
Attendance: 70
Referees: Bojan Kruljac, Mateo Pavičić, Hrvoje Muhvić

=== Final ===
29 April 2019
18:30

Report

Mega Mozzart U19 (Serbia)	88–74	(Montenegro) SC Derby U19
Scoring by quarter: 16–18, 22–19, 31–14, 19–23
Pts: Andrija Grbović 30; Rebs: Oleksandr Kobzystyi 12; Asts: Nikola Jović 7		Pts: Tomislav Ivišić 16; Rebs: Zvonimir Ivišić 12; Asts: T. Ivišić, Ivanović 3

Arena Stožice, Ljubljana
Attendance: 150
Referees: Krunoslav Peić, Marko Mustapić, Rok Misson

Starters:			Pts	Reb	Ast
PG	1	(Serbia) Danilo Labović	5	6	1
SG	6	(Ukraine) Oleksandr Kobzystyi	11	12	3
G/F	11	(Serbia) Nikola Đurišić	22	1	5
G/F	5	(Serbia) Nikola Jović	9	8	7
PF	16	(Montenegro) Andrija Grbović	22	1	5
Reserves:					
G	4	(Serbia) Luka Bogavac	4	1	1
PG	7	(Serbia) Andrej Mušicki	2	2	4
SF	10	(Serbia) Asim Đulović	0	0	0
C	14	(Serbia) Ahmet Jonović	4	4	4
F	19	(Serbia) Bogoljub Marković	0	0	0
C	23	(Serbia) Nikola Đapa	3	0	0
PF	49	(Serbia) Aleksa Milenković	2	1	0
Head coach:
(Serbia) Dragoljub Avramović

Mega Mozzart	SC Derby

MEG	Statistics	SCD
22/40 (55%)	2-pt field goals	20/44 (46%)
10/26 (38%)	3-pt field goals	5/22 (23%)
14/21 (67%)	Free throws	19/25 (76%)
11	Offensive rebounds	13
27	Defensive rebounds	20
38	Total rebounds	33
22	Assists	9
18	Turnovers	17
9	Steals	10
1	Blocks	4
24	Fouls	21

Starters:			Pts	Reb	Ast
PG	5	(Montenegro) Danilo Ivanović	17	3	3
SG	11	(Montenegro) Zoran Vučeljić	15	3	2
SG	10	(Turkey) Eray Buyukcangaz	5	4	0
PF	13	(Croatia) Tomislav Ivišić	16	9	3
PF	12	(Croatia) Zvonimir Ivišić	7	12	0
Reserves:					
PG	4	(Montenegro) Petar Minić	0	0	0
SG	6	(Montenegro) Vasilije Todorović	9	1	1
SG	7	(Montenegro) Boško Janković	DNP		
C	8	(Montenegro) Lazar Radetić	3	1	0
SG	9	(Montenegro) Vladimir Sudar	DNP		
C	14	(Montenegro) Maruan Čičić	DNP		
F	15	(Montenegro) David Mirković	2	0	1
Head coach:
(Montenegro) Borivoje Stanišić

== Awards ==
Pos.	Player	Team	Ref.
MVP
PF	(Montenegro) Andrija Grbović	(Serbia) Mega Mozzart	
Ideal Starting Five
SG	(Serbia) Nikola Jović	(Serbia) Mega Mozzart	
PF	(Montenegro) Andrija Grbović	(Serbia) Mega Mozzart	
PF	(Slovenia) Saša Ciani	(Slovenia) Cedevita Olimpija	
PF	(Bosnia and Herzegovina) Vuk Bošković	(Bosnia and Herzegovina) Igokea	
PF	(Croatia) Tomislav Ivišić	(Montenegro) SC Derby	
