= Aleksa Novaković =

Serbian basketball player

No. 17 – Falco KC Szombathely
- Position: Small forward
- League: Nemzeti Bajnokság I/A

Personal information
- Born: 30 August 1996 (age 30) Belgrade, FR Yugoslavia
- Listed height: 2.00 m (6 ft 7 in)
- Listed weight: 102 kg (225 lb)

Career information
- High school: Findlay Prep (Henderson, Nevada)
- College: Eastern Illinois (2015–2016)
- NBA draft: 2018: undrafted
- Playing career: 2016–present

Career history
- 2016: We're Basket Ortona
- 2016–2017: Nuovo Basket Aquilano
- 2017–2019: Mladost Zemun
- 2019–2020: Novi Pazar
- 2020–2023: Borac Čačak
- 2023–2024: BC Nizhny Novgorod
- 2024–present: Falco KC Szombathely

Aleksa Novaković (Serbian Cyrillic: Алекса Новаковић; born 30 August 1996) is a Serbian professional basketball player for Falco KC Szombathely of the Hungarian Basketball League. He played college basketball for the Eastern Illinois Panthers.

== High school and college career ==
Novaković moved to U.S. to play high school basketball at Findlay Prep in Henderson, Nevada.

As a college basketball player, Novaković played his freshman year with the Eastern Illinois Panthers. He appeared in 8 games (all off the bench) in their 2015–16 season, averaging 0.6 points, 0.9 rebounds, and 0.5 assists per game. He left the Panthers after his freshman year.

== Professional career ==
After his college basketball career, Novaković played for Italian teams We're Basket Ortona and Nuovo Basket Aquilano in the 2016–17 season. Novaković played for Mladost Zemun and Novi Pazar of the Serbian League before joining Borac Čačak in 2020. On 25 June 2022, he signed a two-year contract extension with Borac Čačak. On August 14th 2023 BC Pari Nizhny Novgorod announced that they signed one-year contract with Novaković.

== National team career ==
In June 2022, Serbia national team head coach Svetislav Pešić added Novaković to the 20-man roster for the third window games at the 2023 FIBA Basketball World Cup qualification.
