= Roko Prkačin =

Croatian basketball player (born 2002)

Free Agent
- Position: Power forward

Personal information
- Born: 26 November 2002 (age 23) Zagreb, Croatia
- Listed height: 2.06 m (6 ft 9 in)
- Listed weight: 102 kg (225 lb)

Career information
- Playing career: 2018–present

Career history
- 2018–2022: Cibona
- 2018–2019: →Rudeš
- 2022–2023: Girona
- 2023–2024: Gran Canaria
- 2024–2026: Nanterre 92

Career highlights
- 2× Croatian League champion (2019, 2022); Croatian Cup winner (2022); Junior ABA League champion (2019); Junior Adriatic League MVP (2019); All-Junior Adriatic League Team (2019)
Medals
Men's basketball
Representing Croatia
European U-16 Championship
Gold medal – first place	2018 Serbia	U-16 Team

Roko Prkačin (born 26 November 2002) is a Croatian professional basketball player who last played for Nanterre 92 of the French Ligue nationale de basket. Standing at 2.06 m (6 ft 9 in), he plays at the power forward position.

== Early career ==
Prkačin grew up in the youth system of Cibona. At a very early age he started to stand out among his teammates. With the U-16 Cibona team, in 2017 he won U-16 Europe Youth Basketball League Tournament. He was the tournament's top scorer and was named the MVP. He also played the 2017–18 Junior ABA League and 2018–19 Junior ABA League even though he was in average two to three years younger than his teammates. In June 2019, he attended the Basketball Without Borders Europe camp in Riga, Latvia.

== Professional career ==
In August 2018, Cibona decided to loan Prkačin to KK Rudeš of the second-tier Croatian First League. After playing very well in Rudeš he was called up for the Cibona senior team in January 2019. On 12 January 2019, Prkačin made his professional and Adriatic League debut for Cibona in a 89–68 loss to Cedevita, making 6 points and 6 rebounds. Through 5 Adriatic League games in the 2018–19 season, Prkačin averaged 2.2 points, 2.0 rebounds, and 0.4 assists per game. On 24 September 2020, Prkačin was promoted as the new team captain of Cibona, becoming the youngest captain in clubs history at 17 years and 10 months of age. Following the 2020–21 season Prkačin declared for the 2021 NBA draft. On July 19, 2021, he withdrawn his name from consideration for the 2021 NBA draft.

On July 21, 2022, Prkačin signed with Girona. He averaged 6.5 points a contest in the Liga ACB during the 2022–23 season. He subsequently signed a deal with fellow ACB outfit Gran Canaria. In the 2023-24 campaign, Prkačin saw the hardwood in 22 ACB contests, averaging 2.5 points per outing for the Gran Canaria team.

On June 26, 2024, he agreed to terms with French side Nanterre 92.

== National team career ==
=== Youth teams ===
Prkačin was a member of the Croatia under-17 team that took 7th place at the 2018 FIBA Under-17 Basketball World Cup. In this tournament he averaged 12.3 points, 10.9 rebounds and 1.9 blocks per game.

In the same summer of 2018, Prkačin played with the Croatia under-16 team that won the gold medal at the 2018 FIBA Europe Under-16 Championship held in Novi Sad. Over seven tournament games, he averaged 18.6 points, 10.9 rebounds, 3.7 assists and 2.0 blocks per game and was honored with the tournament's MVP title along with a spot in the All-Star Five team.

=== Senior team ===
On 27 November 2020, one day after his 18th birthday, Prkačin made his debut for the Croatia national team at the EuroBasket 2022 qualification in a 79–62 win over Turkey, making 6 points and one rebound.

== Personal life ==
Roko is a son of the former professional basketball player Nikola Prkačin.
