= Andrija Grbović =

Montenegrin basketball player (born 2003)

No. 14 – Oklahoma State Cowboys
- Position: Power forward
- Conference: Big 12 Conference

Personal information
- Born: 16 September 2003 (age 23) Pljevlja, Serbia and Montenegro
- Listed height: 6 ft 11.5 in (2.12 m)
- Listed weight: 207 lb (94 kg)

Career information
- College: Arizona State (2025–2026); Oklahoma State (2026–present)
- Playing career: 2020–2025

Career history
- 2020–2021: OrangeAcademy
- 2021–2022: OKK Beograd
- 2022–2023: Mega Basket
- 2023–2024: Budućnost
- 2024–2025: Studentski centar

Career highlights
- Junior ABA League champion (2022); Junior ABA League MVP (2022); Junior ABA League Ideal Starting Five (2022)
Medals
Men's basketball
Representing Montenegro
FIBA U20 European Championship
Bronze medal – third place	2022 Montenegro	Team

Andrija Grbović (Serbian Cyrillic: Андрија Грбовић; born 16 September 2003) is a Montenegrin college basketball player for the Oklahoma State Cowboys of the Big 12 Conference. He previously played for the Arizona State Sun Devils.

== Early life and career ==
Grbović was a member of Vizura prior he joined OrangeAcademy based in Ulm, Germany and affiliated to Ratiopharm Ulm in 2018. Afterwards, he joined the Mega Basket youth system in 2021. At the 2021–22 Junior ABA League, he averaged 22 points, 9.2 rebounds, and 1.8 assists per game. His team won the Junior ABA League that season, while he was named the Junior ABA League MVP and received the Junior ABA League Ideal Starting Five selection.

== Professional career ==
Grbović joined the OrangeAcademy roster for the 2020–21 season of the German third-tier ProB league. In summer of 2021, he signed with Mega Basket and was immediately loaned to OKK Beograd for the 2021–22 KLS season. Grbović made his debut for Mega Basket at the 2022 Serbian SuperLeague playoffs.

== National team career ==
In August 2018, Grbović was a member of the Montenegro under-16 team that finished 14th at the FIBA U16 European Championship in Novi Sad, Serbia. Over seven tournament games, he averaged 6.3 points and 3.4 rebounds per game. In August 2019, he was a member of the national under-16 team that finished 4th at the FIBA U16 European Championship Division B in Podgorica, Montenegro. Over eight tournament games, he averaged 15.6 points, 7.4 rebounds, and 1.3 assists per game.

In July 2022, Grbović was a member of the Montenegro under-20 team that won a bronze medal at the FIBA U20 European Championship in Podgorica, Montenegro. Over seven tournament games, he averaged 12.1 points, 6.1 rebounds, and 2.1 assists per game.
