= Mihailo Mušikić =

Serbian basketball player (born 2002)

No. 33 – Mega MIS
- Position: Center
- League: Basketball League of Serbia

Personal information
- Born: 25 March 2002 (age 24) Kraljevo, Serbia, FR Yugoslavia
- Listed height: 2.13 m (7 ft 0 in)
- Listed weight: 103 kg (227 lb)

Career information
- Playing career: 2020–present

Career history
- 2020–present: Mega Basket
- 2020–2022: →OKK Beograd

Career highlights
- Junior ABA League champion (2021)
Medals
Men's basketball
Representing Serbia
U20 European Championship Division B
Gold medal – first place	2022 Georgia	Team

Mihailo Mušikić (Serbian Cyrillic: Михаило Мушикић; born 25 March 2002) is a Serbian professional basketball player for Mega Basket of the ABA League and the Basketball League of Serbia. Standing at 7 ft 0 in (2.13 m) and weighing 227 pounds (103 kg), he plays center position.

== Early life and career ==
Mušikić grew up with the Sloga youth system before joining the Mega Basket youth system in January 2018. He was a member of the Mega U19 team that won the Junior ABA League for the 2020–21 season, recording 15 points, nine rebounds, and two assists per game.

== Professional career ==
In April 2020, Mušikić officially signed his first professional contract with Mega Basket. Also, he joined OKK Beograd on a two-way contract for the 2020–21 and 2021–22 KLS seasons. Mušikić made his senior debut in the ABA League for Mega Basket on 20 January 2022 in a 93–90 win over Partizan NIS, making 10 points, 2 rebounds and an assist in under 20 minutes of playing time.

== National team career ==
In August 2018, Mušikić was a member of the Serbian under-16 national team that participated at the FIBA U16 European Championship in Novi Sad, Serbia. Over seven tournament games, he averaged 6.6 points, 4.7 rebounds, and 1.1 assists per game. In July 2021, Mušikić was a member of the Serbia U19 team at the FIBA Under-19 Basketball World Cup in Latvia. Over eight tournament games, he averaged 10.4 points, 4.9 rebounds, and 2.9 assists per game.

In July 2022, Mušikić was a member of the Serbian under-20 national team that won a gold medal at the 2022 FIBA U20 European Championship Division B in Tbilisi, Georgia. Over seven tournament games, he averaged 11.0 points, 3.0 rebounds, and 2.0 assists per game.
