= Nikola Đurišić =

Serbian basketball player (born 2004)

Nikola Đurišić Никола Ђуришић
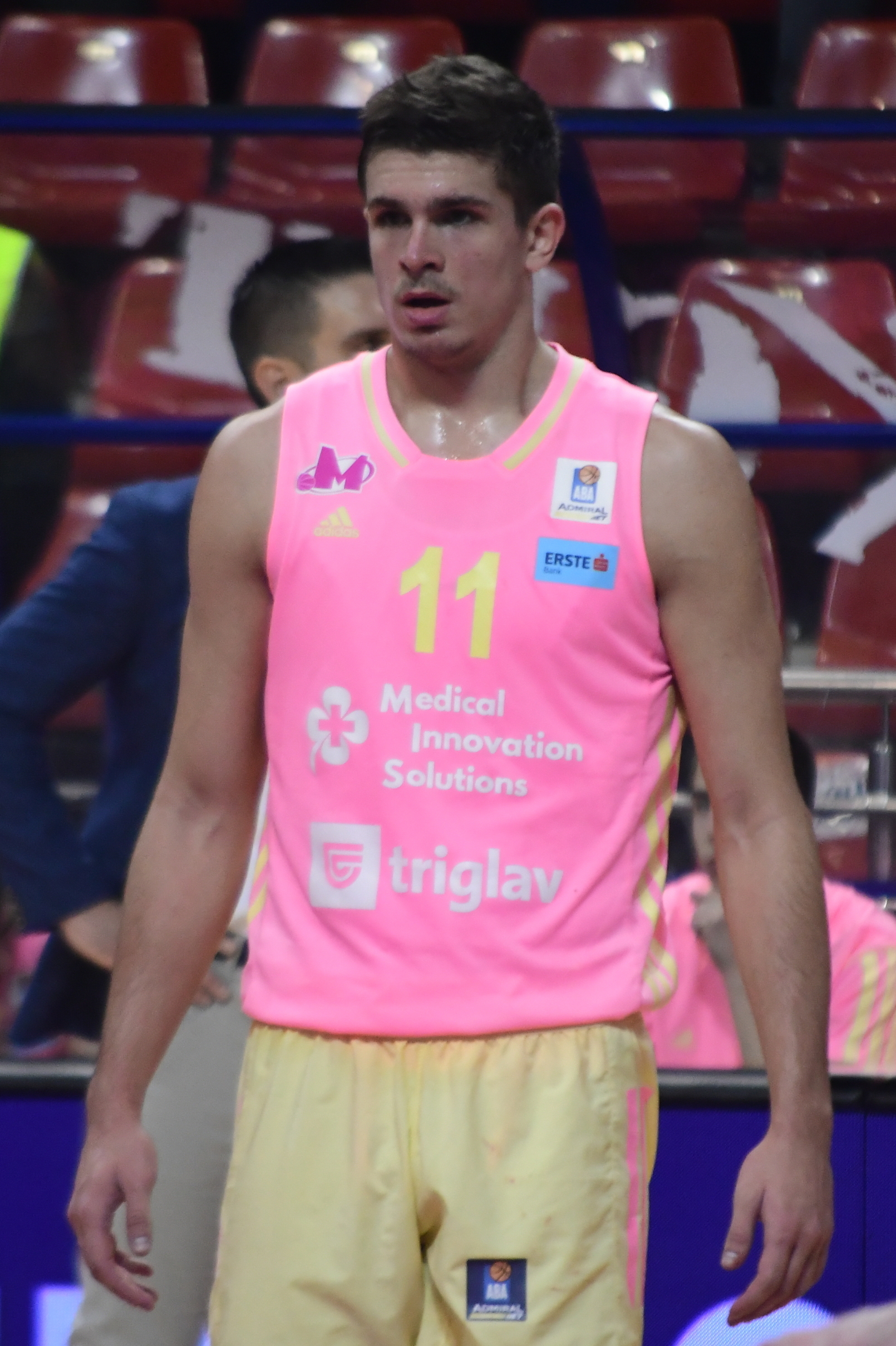
- Đurišić with Mega in 2023

No. 23 – Crvena zvezda
- Position: Point guard / shooting guard
- League: KLS; ABA League; Euroleague

Personal information
- Born: 23 February 2004 (age 22) Ghent, Belgium
- Listed height: 2.04 m (6 ft 8 in)
- Listed weight: 97 kg (214 lb)

Career information
- NBA draft: 2024: 2nd round, 43rd overall pick
- Drafted by: Miami Heat
- Playing career: 2020–present

Career history
- 2020–2024: Mega Basket
- 2020–2021: →OKK Beograd
- 2024–2026: College Park Skyhawks
- 2026–present: Crvena zvezda
- 2026: →Mega

Career highlights
- ABA League Top Prospect (2023); Euroleague NGT champion (2022); 2× Junior ABA League champion (2021, 2022); Euroleague NGT MVP (2022); Junior ABA League Ideal Starting Five (2021)
- Stats at NBA.com
- Stats at Basketball Reference

Nikola Đurišić (Serbian Cyrillic: Никола Ђуришић; born 23 February 2004) is a Serbian professional basketball player for the Crvena zvezda of the Serbian League (KLS) and the ABA League. Đurišić began his professional career playing for Mega Basket in Serbia, and was drafted with the 43rd overall pick in the 2024 NBA draft by the Miami Heat.

== Early life and career ==
Đurišić was born in Ghent, Belgium where his Montenegrin professional footballer father, Duško Đurišić, had been playing at the time. His mother is Vesna Čitaković, a Serbian professional volleyball player with a national team resume, helping Serbia win silver medal at the 2007 European Championship and bronze at the 2006 World Championship.

Young Đurišić spent his early childhood in Belgium, Italy, Turkey and Germany with his mother as she pursued professional volleyball, before he moved to Belgrade, Serbia when he was eight. His uncle, Perica Đurišić, a basketball coach, introduced him to the game.

Đurišić played basketball for the KK Banjica youth system before he joined the Mega Basket youth system in 2017. At the 2020–21 Euroleague Basketball Next Generation Tournament, he averaged 16.9 points, 7.6 rebounds, 5.6 assists and 1.9 steals per game, and won the All-Tournament Team selection.

In May 2022, was named the Euroleague NGT Finals MVP and honored with Euroleague NGT All-Tournament Team, after his team won the Euroleague Basketball Next Generation Tournament for the 2021–22 season.

== Professional career ==
=== Mega Basket (2020–2024) ===
In September 2020, Mega Basket loaned Đurišić to OKK Beograd for the 2020–21 Basketball League of Serbia. Over 29 regular season games, he averaged 16.3 points, 3.2 rebounds and three assists per game.

Đurišić made his senior debut in the ABA League for Mega Basket on 11 April 2021 in a 84–76 loss to FMP making only 17 seconds of playing time. On his 18th birthday, 23 February 2022, Đurišić signed his first professional contract with Mega Basket. In 2022–23 season, Đurišić became one of the team leaders, averaging 13.1 points, 3.7 assists and 3 rebounds over 24 ABA League games. During the 2023–24 season, Đurišić averaged 15.4 points, 3.5 assists and 2.9 rebounds on 46.3% shooting from the field, in 30 ABA League games with Mega.

=== College Park Skyhawks (2024–2026) ===
On 27 June 2024, Đurišić was selected with the 43rd overall pick by the Miami Heat in the 2024 NBA draft; however, immediately on draft night, he was traded along with cash to the Atlanta Hawks via a three-way trade with the Houston Rockets. On 26 October 2024, Đurišić signed with the College Park Skyhawks of the NBA G League.

On July 11, 2025, Đurišić signed with the Atlanta Hawks but did not make the final roster.

=== Crvena zvezda (2026–present) ===
On 18 March 2026, Đurišić signed with Crvena zvezda until the end of the 2027–28 season.

==== Loan to Mega (2026–present) ====
Ðurišić was subsequently loaned to Mega Basket until the end of 2025–26 season.

== National team career ==
Đurišić was a member of the Serbia U16 national team that participated at the 2019 FIBA U16 European Championship in Udine, Italy. Over seven tournament games, he averaged 4.7 points, three rebounds and 1.6 assists per game. He was a member of the Serbia U19 national team at the 2021 FIBA Under-19 Basketball World Cup. Over three tournament games, he averaged 7.7 points, 1.3 rebounds and 3.3 assists per game.

On 25 February 2022, Đurišić made his debut for the Serbia national team at the 2023 FIBA World Cup Qualifiers, just two days after his 18th birthday. In a 75–63 win over Slovakia, he recorded 7 points, 4 rebounds, 1 assist and 3 steals in 20 minutes of playing time.

== Career statistics ==
Legend
GP	Games played	GS	Games started	MPG	Minutes per game
FG%	Field-goal percentage	3P%	3-point field-goal percentage	FT%	Free-throw percentage
RPG	Rebounds per game	APG	Assists per game	SPG	Steals per game
BPG	Blocks per game	PPG	Points per game	PIR	Performance index rating
**Bold**	Career high

=== Adriatic League ===
==== Regular season ====
Year	Team	GP	MPG	FG%	3P%	FT%	RPG	APG	SPG	BPG	PPG	PIR
2020–21	Mega Basket	1	14.0	**.670**	.000	**.800**	2.0	0.0	0.0	0.0	8.0	4.0
2021–22	Mega Basket	19	18.6	.390	**.500**	.790	2.1	1.9	0.6	0.0	6.1	5.1
2022–23	Mega Basket	22	28.3	.410	.220	.700	**3.0**	**3.7**	**1.1**	0.1	13.3	12.1
2023–24	Mega Basket	**26**	**30.7**	.450	.330	.740	2.7	3.4	1.0	**0.4**	**14.4**	**14.2**

==== Playoffs ====
Year	Team	GP	MPG	FG%	3P%	FT%	RPG	APG	SPG	BPG	PPG	PIR
2022–23	Mega Basket	2	26.9	.440	.400	.500	2.5	3.5	0.5	0.5	11.0	9.5
2023–24	Mega Basket	4	33.8	.510	.380	.760	3.8	4.5	2.0	0.8	22.3	23.5

== See also ==
- List of Serbian NBA players
