= Goga Bitadze =

Georgian basketball player (born 1999)

Goga Bitadze გოგა ბითაძე
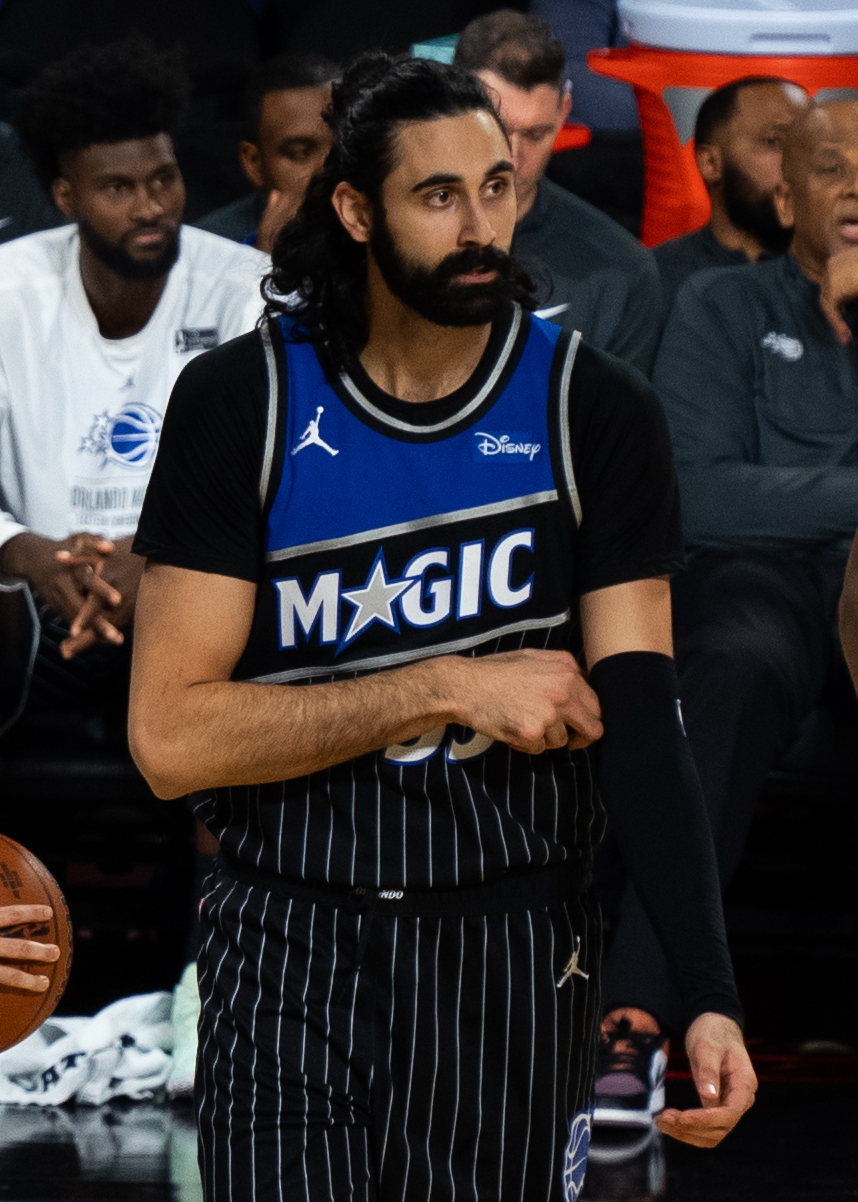
- Bitadze with the Orlando Magic in 2025

No. 35 – Orlando Magic
- Position: Center / power forward
- League: NBA

Personal information
- Born: 20 July 1999 (age 27) Sagarejo, Georgia
- Listed height: 6 ft 11 in (2.11 m)
- Listed weight: 235 lb (107 kg)

Career information
- NBA draft: 2019: 1st round, 18th overall pick
- Drafted by: Indiana Pacers
- Playing career: 2015–present

Career history
- 2015–2016: VITA Tbilisi
- 2016–2019: Mega
- 2016–2017: →Smederevo
- 2018–2019: →Budućnost
- 2019–2023: Indiana Pacers
- 2019–2021: →Fort Wayne Mad Ants
- 2023–present: Orlando Magic

Career highlights
- EuroLeague Rising Star (2019); Montenegrin Cup winner (2019); BLS Most Valuable Player (2019); ABA League MVP (2019); All-ABA League Team (2019); ABA League Top Prospect (2019); ABA League blocks leader (2019); Junior ABA League champion (2018); Junior ABA League MVP (2018); All-Junior ABA League Team (2018)
- Stats at NBA.com
- Stats at Basketball Reference

Goga Bitadze (Georgian: გოგა ბითაძე; born 20 July 1999) is a Georgian professional basketball player for the Orlando Magic of the National Basketball Association (NBA). Listed at 6 ft 11 in (2.11 m) and 250 pounds (110 kg), he plays the center position. He was drafted 18th overall by the Indiana Pacers in the 2019 NBA draft.

Born in Sagarejo, Bitadze started playing basketball professionally with VITA Tbilisi in the VTB United League. In 2015, he moved to Serbian club Mega Basket and was loaned to Serbian League team Smederevo 1953 in the following year. Upon his return to Mega in 2017–18, Bitadze was named most valuable player (MVP) of the Junior ABA League and became a key player for the senior team. At the end of 2018, he was loaned to Budućnost in Montenegro and was named EuroLeague Rising Star for the 2018–19 season.

Bitadze is a member of the Georgian national basketball team. He was named to the national team at EuroBasket 2017 and made his debut at FIBA World Cup qualifiers in 2017. Previously, Bitadze represented Georgia at the junior level in FIBA competition.

== Early life and career ==
Bitadze was born in Sagarejo, a town in eastern Georgia. His father was a professional basketball player whose career was cut short by injury. Although Bitadze did not watch basketball in his childhood, he started playing the game when he was six years old, because he saw himself as "active and tall." As he became more involved in basketball, he began idolizing Georgian players Zaza Pachulia and Tornike Shengelia, as well as NBA stars Pau Gasol and Shaquille O'Neal. On 31 May 2013, Bitadze scored 17 points to help his school team Hyundai win the national under-14 championship over Gori. He also played in the Georgian under-16 league for three years. In 2014–15, his final season with Hyundai at the under-16 level, Bitadze averaged 23.1 points, 16.6 rebounds, 4.5 assists and 3.8 blocks per game. Through his early career, Bitadze trained in the junior ranks of Georgian club VITA Tbilisi.

== Professional career ==
=== VITA Tbilisi (2015–2016) ===
In the 2015–16 season, Bitadze played professionally for VITA Tbilisi in the VTB United League. He made his debut at age 16 and consequently became the youngest player in league history. Through six games, Bitadze averaged 2.8 points, 1.7 rebounds and 0.7 blocks in 13.8 minutes per game.

=== Mega Basket (2015–2019) ===
==== Junior success and Smederevo loan (2015–2017) ====
On 2 December 2015, Bitadze signed with Mega Basket of the Basketball League of Serbia (KLS) and ABA League. Bitadze was drawn to the club because it had produced many NBA players like Nikola Jokić and Ivica Zubac, and he thought the Serbian league was "well run." He described the move, "It was hard for me for a couple of months. I was really frustrated, far away from my family and far away from my friends. It was hard, but then slowly I got used to it... you have to sacrifice in order to achieve something big and get something even bigger." In December 2015, Bitadze averaged 7.8 points and 4 rebounds per game to help Mega's junior team win the Torneo Città di Roma and qualify for the 2015–16 Adidas Next Generation Tournament (ANGT). In three games at the ANGT, he averaged 4.7 points and 5.3 rebounds per game.

For the 2016–17 season, Bitadze was loaned to Serbian club Smederevo 1953, which competed in the KLS. Through 19 games, he averaged 10.6 points, 4.4 rebounds and 1.2 blocks per game. Bitadze debuted on 8 October 2016, recording 5 points and 4 rebounds in a 75–71 loss to Borac Čačak. On 29 October versus Napredak Kruševac, he scored a season-high 18 points, a mark he would match three more times in the season. Bitadze recorded his first double-double on 1 April 2017 against Dunav Stari Banovci, with 18 points and 11 rebounds. In addition, he assumed a leading role for the Mega Basket junior team at the 2016–17 ANGT. Bitadze averaged 17.7 points per game and led the tournament with 10 rebounds and 3.8 blocks per contest, en route to making the All-Tournament Team.

==== Rise to stardom (2017–2018) ====
He returned to Mega entering the 2017–18 season and mainly played with the senior team. Through 22 games in the ABA League, Bitadze averaged 11.8 points, 6.2 rebounds and 2.1 blocks per game, and through 12 games in the KLS, he averaged 15.9 points and 6.7 rebounds per game. He debuted on 1 October 2017, recording 12 points, 9 rebounds and 5 blocks in a 95–88 win over Cibona. In January 2018, Bitadze briefly played for Mega's junior team and helped capture the Junior ABA League championship. After averaging 17 points and 11 rebounds in the final tournament, he was named league MVP and earned Ideal Five recognition. On 20 January, Bitadze scored 23 points versus Cedevita, his season-high mark in the ABA League. He declared for the 2018 NBA draft on 12 April and was considered a possible second-round pick. Bitadze recorded 19 points and season bests of 15 rebounds and 6 blocks on 24 April, in a 92–90 loss to Mladost Zemun in the KLS. On 30 May, he had his best scoring effort of the season, posting 25 points on 9-of-12 shooting in an 83–61 victory over Vršac in KLS play. Bitadze withdrew from the 2018 NBA draft on 11 June, less than two weeks from draft night.

To start the 2018–19 season, he continued playing for Mega. In an exhibition game versus NCAA Division I team Kentucky on 11 August 2018, Bitadze suffered an injury towards the end of the first half and did not return. On 30 September, in his ABA League season debut, he chipped in 24 points and 12 rebounds in an 80–79 win over Igokea. On 30 October, two days after recording 26 points, 10 rebounds and 3 blocks against Mornar Bar, Bitadze was named monthly MVP in the ABA League. In his following appearance on 3 November, he scored a season-high 28 points, shooting 10-of-11 from the field, while posting 11 rebounds and 4 blocks in an 81–74 loss to Partizan. On 24 November, Bitadze scored 28 points again, leading his team to an 82–80 victory over Cibona. Through 11 games for Mega, all of which were in the ABA League, he averaged 20.2 points, 7.9 rebounds, and 2.6 blocks per game.

==== Budućnost loan (2018–2019) ====
On 20 December 2018, Bitadze was loaned to Montenegrin club Budućnost, which at the time competed in top-tier continental EuroLeague. He joined the team for the remainder of the season. Reflecting on the transition to his new club, Bitadze said, "It was not an easy situation, especially the first couple of days. I mean, it is still hard now to get used to things. But my teammates and coaches helped me." In his first game for Budućnost, on 24 December, he recorded 12 points and 4 rebounds versus Krka in the ABA League. Four days later, Bitadze made his EuroLeague debut, chipping in 17 points, 7 rebounds and 4 blocks in a 93–88 loss to Bayern Munich. On 3 January 2019, he had another strong EuroLeague performance, posting 23 points, 8 rebounds and 3 blocks off the bench in a 111–94 defeat to Olimpia Milano. Over 13 EuroLeague games, Bitadze averaged 12.1 points, 6.4 rebounds and 2.3 blocks per game and claimed EuroLeague Rising Star honors as the best under-22 player in the EuroLeague. After Budućnost failed to qualify to the Playoffs of the EuroLeague, Bitadze returned to Mega for the rest of the season.

=== Indiana Pacers (2019–2023) ===
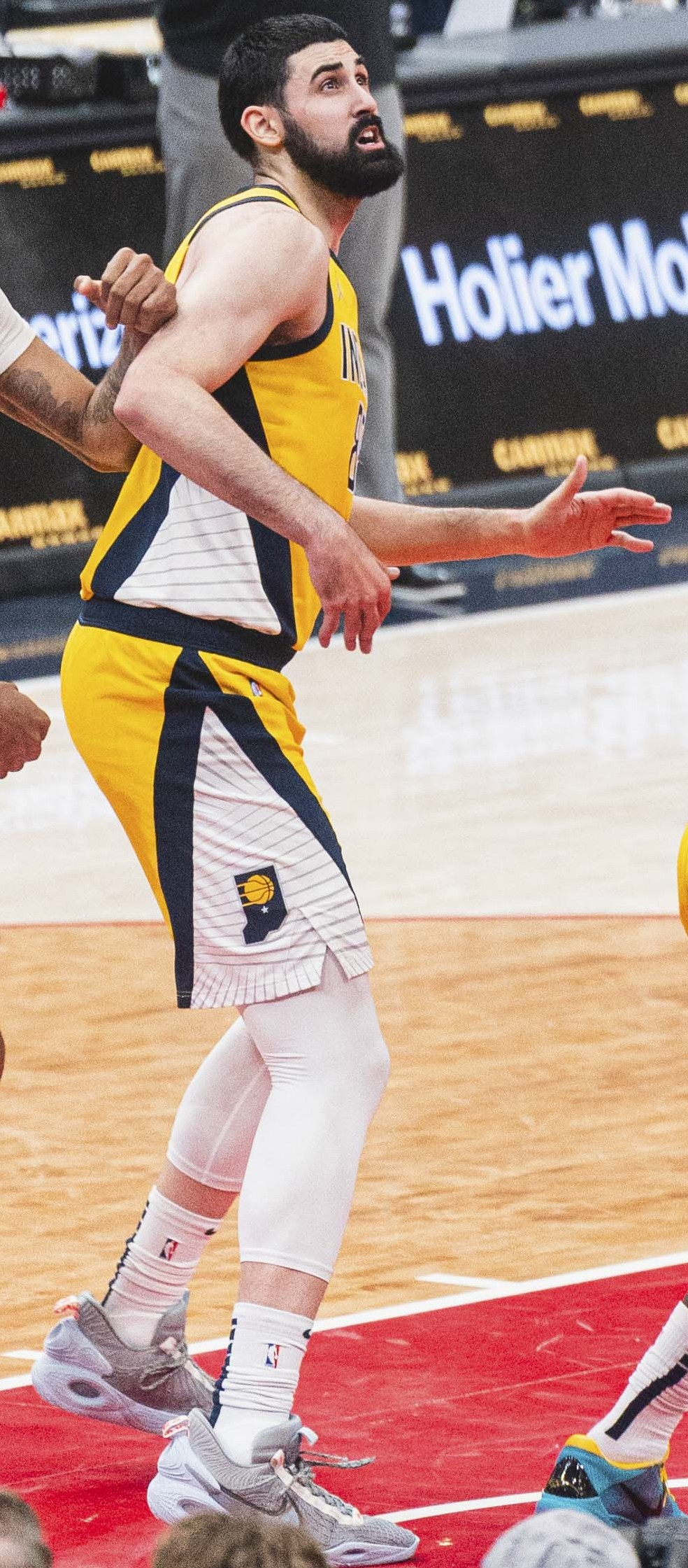
Bitadze with the Indiana Pacers in 2022

On 20 April 2019, Bitadze declared for the 2019 NBA draft, for which he was considered a possible lottery pick. On 19 June, during media availability for the draft, Bitadze appeared in a viral photo that showed him being ignored by reporters, who instead surrounded Zion Williamson, the eventual first overall pick, in the background. A number of NBA players, including Dwyane Wade and Draymond Green, suggested he use the photo as motivation. He was drafted by the Indiana Pacers with the 18th pick overall in the 2019 NBA draft. On 15 July 2019, the Pacers announced that they had signed Bitadze. On 28 October 2019, Bitadze made his NBA debut, coming off the bench in a 110–99 loss to the Cleveland Cavaliers with two points and a rebound.

On 9 February 2023, Bitadze was waived by the Pacers after three-and-a-half seasons.

=== Orlando Magic (2023–present) ===
On 13 February 2023, Bitadze signed with the Orlando Magic on rest-of-season contract. On 6 July 2024, he re-signed with the Magic on a three-year, $25 million contract.

== National team career ==
=== Junior national team ===
Bitadze played for the Georgian national under-17 team at the 2015 FIBA Europe Under-16 Championship Division B, averaging 14.2 points, 8.8 rebounds and 3.7 blocks per game en route to a fifth-place finish. He had his best scoring display in the tournament on 13 August 2015, posting 24 points and 11 rebounds in an 80–66 loss to Sweden. At the 2016 FIBA Europe Under-18 Championship Division B, Bitadze averaged 11.4 points, 10.2 rebounds and 4.1 blocks per game for the Georgian under-18 team. On 6 August 2016, he recorded tournament-best marks of 23 points and 9 blocks while grabbing 13 rebounds in a 103–101 win over Bulgaria. Bitadze returned to national team play in 2017, averaging 10.9 points and 6.3 rebounds per game at the FIBA Europe Under-20 Championship Division B.

=== Senior national team ===
Bitadze was first named to the Georgian senior national team at EuroBasket 2017, but a calf ligament injury forced him to sit out of the entire competition. Regardless, he "learned a lot on and off the court" by observing his veteran teammates, including Zaza Pachulia and Giorgi Shermadini. On 24 November 2017, Bitadze debuted for the senior national team versus Germany during qualification for the 2019 FIBA World Cup, scoring 4 points in 17 minutes. At EuroBasket 2025, Bitadze led Georgia in scoring in blocks as his team made it to the quarterfinals and defeated France in the Round of 16.

== Career statistics ==
Legend
GP	Games played	GS	Games started	MPG	Minutes per game
FG%	Field-goal percentage	3P%	3-point field-goal percentage	FT%	Free-throw percentage
RPG	Rebounds per game	APG	Assists per game	SPG	Steals per game
BPG	Blocks per game	PPG	Points per game	PIR	Performance index rating
**Bold**	Career high

=== NBA ===
==== Regular season ====
Year	Team	GP	GS	MPG	FG%	3P%	FT%	RPG	APG	SPG	BPG	PPG
2019–20	Indiana	54	2	8.7	.467	.190	.727	2.0	.4	.2	.7	3.2
2020–21	Indiana	45	3	12.5	.428	.253	**.738**	3.3	.8	.2	1.3	5.1
2021–22	Indiana	50	16	14.6	.520	**.288**	.681	3.5	1.1	.4	.8	7.0
2022–23	Indiana	21	0	9.6	.519	.286	.458	2.3	.9	.4	.5	3.3
2022–23	Orlando	17	1	15.0	.575	.167	.667	5.2	1.2	.4	.9	5.8
2023–24	Orlando	62	33	15.4	.603	.143	.655	4.6	1.3	.5	1.2	5.0
2024–25	Orlando	**70**	**42**	**20.4**	.611	.107	.639	**6.6**	**2.0**	**.7**	**1.4**	**7.2**
2025–26	Orlando	64	3	15.2	**.676**	.182	.711	5.0	1.3	.6	1.0	5.9
Career		383	100	14.6	.561	.229	.671	4.3	1.2	.5	1.0	5.5

==== Playoffs ====
Year	Team	GP	GS	MPG	FG%	3P%	FT%	RPG	APG	SPG	BPG	PPG
2024	Orlando	2	0	4.9	.000	—	—	1.5	**1.0**	.0	.0	.0
2025	Orlando	3	0	3.7	**1.000**	—	—	1.0	.3	.0	.3	.7
2026	Orlando	**6**	0	**13.8**	.400	—	.714	**4.0**	.3	**.3**	**1.7**	**2.8**
Career		11	0	9.5	.389	—	.714	2.7	.5	.2	1.0	1.7

=== EuroLeague ===
Year	Team	GP	GS	MPG	FG%	3P%	FT%	RPG	APG	SPG	BPG	PPG	PIR
2018–19	Budućnost	13	4	24.2	.548	.313	.714	6.4	1.2	.5	2.3	12.1	16.3
Career		13	4	24.2	.548	.313	.714	6.4	1.2	.5	2.3	12.1	16.3

== See also ==
- List of foreign basketball players in Serbia
- List of NBA drafted players from Serbia
