= Nikola Jović =

British-Serbian basketball player (born 2003)

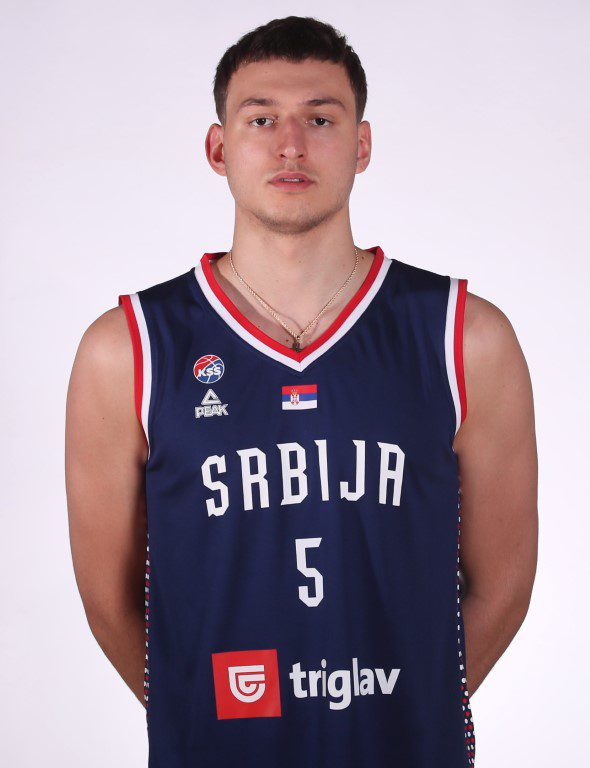
- Jović with Serbia in 2024

No. 5 – Miami Heat
- Position: Power forward / small forward
- League: NBA

Personal information
- Born: 9 June 2003 (age 23) Leicester, England
- Listed height: 6 ft 10 in (2.08 m)
- Listed weight: 205 lb (93 kg)

Career information
- NBA draft: 2022: 1st round, 27th overall pick
- Drafted by: Miami Heat
- Playing career: 2021–present

Career history
- 2021–2022: Mega Basket
- 2022–present: Miami Heat
- 2022–2023: →Sioux Falls Skyforce

Career highlights
- ABA League Top Prospect (2022); 2× Junior ABA League champion (2021, 2022); Junior ABA League MVP (2021); 2× Junior ABA League Ideal Starting 5 (2021, 2022)
- Stats at NBA.com
- Stats at Basketball Reference
Medals
Men's basketball
Representing Serbia
Olympic Games
Bronze medal – third place	2024 Paris	Team
FIBA World Cup
Silver medal – second place	2023 Philippines–Japan–Indonesia

Nikola Jović (Serbian Cyrillic: Никола Јовић, pronounced [nǐkola jǒːʋitɕ]; born 9 June 2003) is a British-Serbian professional basketball player for the Miami Heat of the National Basketball Association (NBA). He was selected 27th overall by the Heat in the 2022 NBA draft.

== Early career ==
Jović was born in the Royal Infirmary in Leicester, Leicestershire, England, as his father, Ilija, was playing professional basketball there at the time. When he was nine, the family moved back to Serbia where he grew up playing water polo for VK Partizan as well as basketball. Jović was playing basketball for the KK Sava youth system before he joined the Mega Basket youth system in 2018. At the 2021–22 Euroleague Basketball Next Generation Tournament in the Serbian capital Belgrade, he averaged 29.3 points, 10.3 rebounds, 4.5 assists and 1.8 blocks in 28 minutes per game, while shooting 66% from the field and 17% from three and won the MVP award.

== Professional career ==
=== Mega Basket (2021–2022) ===
Jović made his senior debut for Mega Basket in February 2021 at the Radivoj Korać Cup tournament in Novi Sad. On 19 March, Jović made his ABA League debut in a 74–65 loss to Split, recording 10 points and 9 rebounds in 21 minutes of playing time. On 10 June 2021, one day after his 18th birthday he signed his first professional contract with Mega.

In the NBA.com GM Survey for the 2021–22 NBA season, Jović received votes for the best international player not playing in the NBA. In April 2022, he was named the ABA League Top Prospect for the 2021–22 season. During the 2021–22 season, Jović averaged 11.7 points while shooting 42.8 percent from the field, 35.6 percent on threes and 75.4 percent from the free throw, 4.4 rebounds, 3.4 assists to 2.7 turnovers and 0.4 blocks per game in 25 appearances.

=== Miami Heat (2022–present) ===
In April 2022, Jović declared for the 2022 NBA draft. On 23 June 2022, Jović attended the NBA draft held at the Barclays Center in Brooklyn, New York. He was selected with the 27th overall pick by the Miami Heat in the draft. Jović signed a multi-year rookie scale contract with the Heat on 2 July. In July, he joined the Heat for the NBA Summer League.

On 23 October 2022, Jović was suspended for one game without pay for leaving the bench during an altercation between the Heat and the Toronto Raptors during the previous night. He was assigned to the NBA G League on 30 December.

Jović was on the Heat team that played in the 2023 NBA Finals; the Heat lost the series in five games to the Denver Nuggets.

On 13 February 2024, Jović scored a career-high 24 points, with 7 rebounds, in a 123–97 win against the Milwaukee Bucks.

During the 2024–25 NBA season, Jović made ten starts and 46 appearances for Miami, averaging 10.7 points, 3.9 rebounds, and 2.8 assists. On 28 April 2025, during the first round of the playoffs, Jović recorded 24 points, five rebounds and two steals in a 138–83 Game 4 loss against the Cleveland Cavaliers, a loss that eliminated the Heat from the playoffs.

On 3 October 2025, the Miami Heat announced that they had signed Jović to a four-year, $62.4 million rookie contract extension. Jović made 47 appearances (including one start) for Miami during the 2025–26 season, recording averages of 7.3 points, 3.3 rebounds, and 2.2 assists.

== National team career ==
Jović missed the 2019 FIBA U16 European Championship in Udine, Italy due to a right arm injury.

In July 2021, Jović was a member of the Serbia U19 national team at the FIBA Under-19 Basketball World Cup. Over seven tournament games, he averaged 18.1 points, 8.3 rebounds, and 2.9 assists per game. He was named to the all-tournament team.

In February 2022, Jović made his debut for the Serbia national team at the 2023 FIBA World Cup Qualifiers, at the age of 18. Initially at the preliminary Serbia roster for EuroBasket 2022, Jović was cut from the squad due to disapproval of the Heat.

In August 2023, Jović played for the Serbia national team at the 2023 FIBA World Cup. He averaged 10.1 points, 3.0 rebounds, and 2.6 assists over eight games, helping Serbia win the silver medal. He won the bronze medal at the 2024 Summer Olympics with Serbia.

== Career statistics ==
Legend
GP	Games played	GS	Games started	MPG	Minutes per game
FG%	Field goal percentage	3P%	3-point field goal percentage	FT%	Free throw percentage
RPG	Rebounds per game	APG	Assists per game	SPG	Steals per game
BPG	Blocks per game	PPG	Points per game	**Bold**	Career high

=== Adriatic League ===
==== Regular season ====
Year	Team	GP	MPG	FG%	3P%	FT%	RPG	APG	SPG	BPG	PPG	PIR
2020–21	Mega Basket	4	24.7	.550	.400	.750	5.5	1.0	0.2	0.5	11.8	15.8
2021–22	Mega Basket	25	27.8	.430	.360	.750	4.4	3.4	0.6	0.4	11.7	12.7

=== NBA ===
==== Regular season ====
Year	Team	GP	GS	MPG	FG%	3P%	FT%	RPG	APG	SPG	BPG	PPG
2022–23	Miami	15	8	13.6	.406	.229	**.947**	2.1	.7	**.5**	.1	5.5
2023–24	Miami	46	**38**	19.5	.452	**.399**	.702	**4.2**	2.0	.5	.3	7.7
2024–25	Miami	46	10	**25.1**	**.456**	.371	.828	3.9	**2.8**	**.8**	.3	**10.7**
2025–26	Miami	**47**	1	17.2	.366	.269	.683	3.3	2.2	.6	**.4**	7.3
Career		154	57	19.9	.425	.341	.756	3.6	2.2	.6	.3	8.3

==== Playoffs ====
Year	Team	GP	GS	MPG	FG%	3P%	FT%	RPG	APG	SPG	BPG	PPG
2023	Miami	**7**	0	1.8	.250	.000	—	.7	.0	.0	.0	.3
2024	Miami	5	**5**	**25.7**	**.444**	**.409**	.857	**6.6**	**2.2**	**1.0**	**.6**	9.4
2025	Miami	4	0	18.8	.371	.250	**1.000**	4.0	1.5	.8	.3	**9.5**
Career		16	5	13.5	.400	.313	.923	3.4	1.1	.5	.3	5.4

== See also ==
- List of NBA drafted players from Serbia
- List of Serbian NBA players
