= Marko Pavićević (basketball) =

Serbian basketball player (born 2001)

No. 9 – Studentski centar
- Position: Power forward / center
- League: Prva A Liga; ABA League

Personal information
- Born: 8 May 2001 (age 25) Belgrade, Serbia, FR Yugoslavia
- Listed height: 2.09 m (6 ft 10 in)
- Listed weight: 100 kg (220 lb)

Career information
- Playing career: 2019–present

Career history
- 2019–2020: Crvena zvezda mts
- 2019: →FMP
- 2019–2020: →Tamiš
- 2020–2024: FMP
- 2020–2021: →Tamiš
- 2024–2025: Borac Čačak
- 2025–2026: BC Vienna
- 2026–present: Studentski centar
Medals
Men's basketball
Representing Serbia
FIBA Europe Under-16 Championship
Bronze medal – third place	2017 Montenegro	U16 team

Marko Pavićević (Serbian Cyrillic: Марко Павићевић, born 8 May 2001) is a Serbian professional basketball player for Studentski centar of the Prva A Liga and the ABA League.

== Early career ==
Pavićević started to play basketball for his hometown team Vizura. In summer 2017, Pavićević was added to the Crvena zvezda youth team. Pavićević won the second place at the 2018–19 Junior ABA League season with the Zvezda. Over seven-season games, he averaged 6.4 points, 3.6 rebounds and 1.7 assists per game.

== Professional career ==
In April 2019, Pavićević was loaned out to FMP of the Basketball League of Serbia. On 27 April, he made his Serbian League debut against Zlatibor, making 2 points in under 3 minutes of playing time. On 8 June 2019, Pavićević signed a multi-year contract for Crvena zvezda. On 4 September 2019, he was loaned to Tamiš for the 2019–20 BLS season. On 17 September 2020, Pavićević signed his first professional contract with FMP. On 2 October 2020, he was loaned to Tamiš.

== National team career ==
Pavićević was a member of the Serbian under-16 national team that won the bronze medal at the 2017 FIBA Europe Under-16 Championship in Montenegro. Over seven tournament games, he averaged 6.9 points, 3.1 rebounds and 0.3 assists per game. Pavićević was a member of the Serbian under-17 team that participated at the 2018 FIBA Under-17 Basketball World Cup in Argentina. Over three tournament games, he averaged 1.3 points, 1.3 rebounds and 0.3 assists per game.

== Personal life ==
His older brother Filip (born 1999) is a basketball player for San Severo of the Serie A2. Filip played for Italian clubs Orlandina, Scafati and Teramo.
