= Boris Gnjidić =

Croatian basketball player

Personal information
- Born: 9 October 1967 (age 59) Zagreb, Croatia, SFR Yugoslavia
- Listed height: 1.99 m (6 ft 6 1/2 in)
- Listed weight: 98 kg (216 lb)

Career information
- Playing career: 1992–2006
- Position: Forward
- Number: 5

Career history

Playing
- 1992–1995: Zagreb
- 1995–1996: Olimpija Slavoning
- 1996–2001: Benston / DONA Dubrava
- 2001–2004: KRKA Novo Mesto
- 2004–2005: Pivovarna Laško
- 2005–2006: Dubrava

Coaching
- 2006–2007 2009–2011, 2012: Dubrava

Career highlights
- Slovenian League champion (2003); Croatian All-Star Game (2001); Slovenian All-Star Game (2005)

Boris Gnjidić (born October 9, 1967) is a Croatian former basketball player who played as forward. Currently he work as sport director of KK Dubrava.

== Basketball career ==
Gnjidić played from 1992 to 2001 in first Croatian division for teams Zagreb, Olimpija Osijek and Dubrava.

He was key player for KRKA from 2001 to 2004. He won Slovenian League in season 2002-03 and team captain (2003-04).

On July 29, 2004, he signed one-year contract with Laško.

== Career statistics ==
Legend
GP	Games played	GS	Games started	MPG	Minutes per game
FG%	Field-goal percentage	3P%	3-point field-goal percentage	FT%	Free-throw percentage
RPG	Rebounds per game	APG	Assists per game	SPG	Steals per game
BPG	Blocks per game	PPG	Points per game	PIR	Performance index rating
**Bold**	Career high

=== EuroLeague ===
Year	Team	GP	GS	MPG	FG%	3P%	FT%	RPG	APG	SPG	BPG	PPG	PIR
2001–02	KRKA Novo Mesto	14	13	28.5	.504	.471	.828	4.0	.9	1.0	.3	11.6	10.6
2003–04	KRKA Novo Mesto	10	6	17.1	.404	.375	.813	1.2	.8	1.2	.2	6.0	4.0
Career		24	19	23.2	.475	.440	.822	2.8	.9	1.1	.3	9.3	7.6
