= 2019–20 Junior ABA League =

Junior ABA League
- Season: 2019–20
- Dates: 28 November – 1 December 2019
- Games played: 30
- Teams: 12

Finals
- Champions: None declared
- All statistics correct as of December 1, 2019.

The 2019–20 Junior ABA League was the 3rd season of the Junior ABA League with twelve men's under-19 teams from Serbia, Slovenia, Croatia, Bosnia and Herzegovina, Montenegro and North Macedonia. Teams are the junior selections of the ABA League teams.

On 12 March 2020, the ABA League Assembly temporarily suspended its competitions due to the COVID-19 pandemic. On 27 May 2020, the ABA League Assembly canceled definitely its competitions due to the COVID-19 pandemic.

The Final tournament would have been played on 21–22 March 2020 at the Železnik Hall, Belgrade. Cibona U19 was the defending champion and as a consequence of the COVID-19 pandemic, the ABA League Assembly decided not to recognize any team as the champion for the season.

== Competition system ==
Twelve under-19 teams are participating in the 2019–20 Junior ABA League season and they are divided into two groups in the first stage. In the group stage, all teams will face each other team within a group in a round-robin system. The two best-placed teams of each group will advance to the final tournament. At the final tournament, the teams will play two games – the semifinal and the final or third-place game. The winner of the final tournament will become the 2019–20 ABA Junior Tournament Champion.

== Teams ==
=== Team allocation ===
First stage
(Serbia) U19 Crvena zvezda mts	(Slovenia) U19 Cedevita Olimpija	(Croatia) U19 Cibona	(Montenegro) U19 Budućnost VOLI
(Serbia) U19 Mega Bemax	(Slovenia) U19 Krka	(Croatia) U19 Zadar	(Montenegro) U19 Mornar
(Serbia) U19 Partizan NIS	(Slovenia) U19 Koper Primorska	(Bosnia and Herzegovina) U19 Igokea	(North Macedonia) U19 MZT Skopje Aerodrom

=== Locations and personnel ===
Location of teams in the 2019–20 Junior ABA League

Team	Home city	Head coach	Captain
U19 Budućnost VOLI	Podgorica	(Montenegro) Miloš Radović	(Montenegro) Fedor Žugić
U19 Cedevita Olimpija	Ljubljana	(Slovenia) Borut Fijavž	
U19 Cibona	Zagreb	(Croatia) Ivan Juran	
U19 Crvena zvezda mts	Belgrade	(Serbia) Slobodan Klipa	(Serbia) Lazar Vasić
U19 Igokea	Aleksandrovac	(Bosnia and Herzegovina) Slobodan Kecman	
U19 Koper Primorska	Koper	(Serbia) Jovan Beader	
U19 Krka	Novo Mesto	(Croatia) Leon Stipaničev	
U19 Mega Bemax	Belgrade	(Serbia) Dragoljub Avramović	(Serbia) Aleksandar Langović
U19 Mornar	Bar	(Montenegro) Radovan Pešić	
U19 MZT Skopje Aerodrom	Skopje	(North Macedonia) Goran Krstevski	
U19 Partizan NIS	Belgrade	(Serbia) Goran Stevanović	
U19 Zadar	Zadar	(Croatia) Jurica Ružić	

== First stage ==
Serbia

Twelve participating teams Budućnost VOLI, Cedevita Olimpija, Cibona, Crvena zvezda mts, Igokea, Koper Primorska, Krka, Mega Bemax, Mornar, MZT Skopje Aerodrom, Partizan NIS and Zadar were divided into two first stage groups. The two best placed teams of each group advanced to the final tournament.

=== Group A ===
Venue: Mega Factory Hall, Belgrade

Pos	Team	Pld	W	L	PF	PA	PD	Pts	Qualification
1	(Serbia) U19 Mega Bemax	5	5	0	452	409	+43	10	Advance to the Final tournament
2	(Croatia) U19 Cibona	5	3	2	482	429	+53	8	Advance to the Final tournament
3	(Bosnia and Herzegovina) U19 Igokea	5	2	3	397	410	−13	7	
4	(Montenegro) U19 Budućnost VOLI	5	2	3	434	450	−16	7	
5	(Serbia) U19 Partizan NIS	5	2	3	428	474	−46	7	
6	(Slovenia) U19 Krka	5	1	4	421	442	−21	6	

Source: Junior ABA League

28 November 2019
Cibona U19 (Croatia)	100–71	(Slovenia) U19 Krka
Igokea U19 (Bosnia and Herzegovina)	85–83	(Montenegro) U19 Budućnost VOLI
Partizan NIS U19 (Serbia)	74–89	(Serbia) U19 Mega Bemax
Cibona U19 (Croatia)	90–68	(Bosnia and Herzegovina) U19 Igokea
29 November 2019
Krka U19 (Slovenia)	89–90	(Serbia) U19 Mega Bemax
Budućnost VOLI U19 (Montenegro)	91–81	(Serbia) U19 Partizan NIS
Igokea U19 (Bosnia and Herzegovina)	67–88	(Slovenia) U19 Krka
Partizan NIS U19 (Serbia)	98–94	(Croatia) U19 Cibona
30 November 2019
Mega Bemax U19 (Serbia)	96–86	(Montenegro) U19 Budućnost VOLI
Igokea U19 (Bosnia and Herzegovina)	109–77	(Serbia) U19 Partizan NIS
Krka U19 (Slovenia)	82–87	(Montenegro) U19 Budućnost VOLI
Cibona U19 (Croatia)	92–105	(Serbia) U19 Mega Bemax
1 December 2019
Partizan NIS U19 (Serbia)	98–91	(Slovenia) U19 Krka
Budućnost VOLI U19 (Montenegro)	87–106	(Croatia) U19 Cibona
Mega Bemax U19 (Serbia)	72–68	(Bosnia and Herzegovina) U19 Igokea

=== Group B ===
Croatia

Venue: Jazine Basketball Hall, Zadar

Pos	Team	Pld	W	L	PF	PA	PD	Pts	Qualification
1	(Serbia) U19 Crvena zvezda mts	5	5	0	408	262	+146	10	Advance to the Final tournament
2	(Slovenia) U19 Koper Primorska	5	3	2	372	395	−23	8	Advance to the Final tournament
3	(North Macedonia) U19 MZT Skopje Aerodrom	5	3	2	387	379	+8	8	
4	(Slovenia) U19 Cedevita Olimpija	5	2	3	360	370	−10	7	
5	(Croatia) U19 Zadar	5	1	4	328	400	−72	6	
6	(Montenegro) U19 Mornar	5	1	4	329	378	−49	6	

Source: Junior ABA League

28 November 2019
Crvena zvezda mts U19 (Serbia)	95–50	(Slovenia) U19 Koper Primorska
Cedevita Olimpija U19 (Slovenia)	85–71	(Croatia) U19 Zadar
MZT Skopje Aerodrom U19 (North Macedonia)	82–73	(Montenegro) U19 Mornar
Crvena zvezda mts U19 (Serbia)	69–59	(Slovenia) U19 Cedevita Olimpija
29 November 2019
Koper Primorska U19 (Slovenia)	86–75	(Montenegro) U19 Mornar
Zadar U19 (Croatia)	71–80	(North Macedonia) U19 MZT Skopje Aerodrom
Cedevita Olimpija U19 (Slovenia)	79–78	(Slovenia) U19 Koper Primorska
MZT Skopje Aerodrom U19 (North Macedonia)	61–78	(Serbia) U19 Crvena zvezda mts
30 November 2019
Mornar U19 (Montenegro)	64–77	(Croatia) U19 Zadar
Cedevita Olimpija U19 (Slovenia)	70–82	(North Macedonia) U19 MZT Skopje Aerodrom
Crvena zvezda mts U19 (Serbia)	66–47	(Montenegro) U19 Mornar
Koper Primorska U19 (Slovenia)	71–64	(Croatia) U19 Zadar
1 December 2019
Mornar U19 (Montenegro)	70–67	(Slovenia) U19 Cedevita Olimpija
MZT Skopje Aerodrom U19 (North Macedonia)	82–87	(Slovenia) U19 Koper Primorska
Zadar U19 (Croatia)	45–100	(Serbia) U19 Crvena zvezda mts

== See also ==
- 2019–20 Euroleague Basketball Next Generation Tournament
