= Dragoljub Avramović =

Serbian basketball coach

Crvena zvezda Meridianbet
- Position: U19 Head Coach
- League: Junior ABA League

Personal information
- Born: 10 February 1979 (age 47) Belgrade, SR Serbia, Yugoslavia
- Coaching career: 2010–present

Career history

Coaching
- 2010–2016: Beovuk 72 (youth)
- 2016–2018: Partizan (youth)
- 2018–2024: Mega Basket (youth)
- 2024–present: Crvena zvezda (youth)

Dragoljub Avramović (Serbian Cyrillic: Драгољуб Аврамовић; born 10 February 1979) is a Serbian professional basketball coach who is the youth system coordinator for the Crvena zvezda youth system and their U19 head coach.

== Coaching career ==
Since 2010, Avramović coached youth systems of Belgrade-based clubs Beovuk 72 and Partizan prior he joined Mega Basket in July 2018. Coaching the Mega Basket U18 & U19 selections, Avramović won the Junior ABA League in 2020–21 and 2021–22, as well as the Euroleague Basketball Next Generation Tournament in 2021–22.

== National team coaching career ==
In August 2021, Avramović was the head coach of the Serbia national under-16 team at the 2021 FIBA U16 European Challengers, winning the Group C with a 5–0 record. In December 2021, the Basketball Federation of Serbia named Avramović as their new head coach for the Serbia U17 team in 2022. His team finished the 5th at the 2022 FIBA Under-17 Basketball World Cup.

== Career achievements ==
- Euroleague NGT champion: 1 (with Mega Basket: 2021–22)
- Junior ABA League champion: 4 (with Mega Basket: 2020–21, 2021–22, 2022–23, 2023–24)
