= Junior ABA League =

- Founded: July 2017; 7 years ago
- First season: 2017–18
- Country: Bosnia and Herzegovina; Croatia; North Macedonia; Montenegro; Serbia; Slovenia
- Confederation: FIBA Europe
- Divisions: 2
- Number of teams: 12
- Level on pyramid: 1st
- Current champions: (Serbia) Mega Basket U19 (2nd title) (2020–21)
- Most championships: 3 titles (Serbia) Mega Basket U19

The Junior ABA League, officially known as the U19 ABA League Championship, is a regional boy's youth age basketball tournament that is contested between the youth selections of basketball clubs from the ABA League. It is run by the ABA League JTD. It is a regional competition between men's teams from six countries: Bosnia and Herzegovina, Croatia, Montenegro, North Macedonia, Serbia and Slovenia.

== History ==
The ABA League Assembly, held on July 24, 2017 in Belgrade, Serbia, decided to organize the Junior League with a desire to strengthen its position as the main power for development of basketball in the region. On October 26, 2017, participants, hosts and dates for the inaugural tournament was confirmed.

Mega Bemax became champions of the first-ever U19 ABA League Championship Final Four tournament, which took place in Laktaši in 2018, as they have beaten Crvena zvezda. In 2019, the second Final Four tournament took place in Slavonski Brod, where Cibona became champion beating Crvena zvezda in the final.

On 12 March 2020, the ABA League Assembly temporarily suspended the 2019–20 season due to the COVID-19 pandemic. On 27 May 2020, the ABA League Assembly canceled indefinitely the season due to the COVID-19 pandemic.

== Finals ==
Season	Host city	Champion	Runner-up	Score	MVP	Champion's Coach
2017–18	(Bosnia and Herzegovina) Laktaši	(Serbia) Mega Bemax U19	(Serbia) Crvena zvezda U19	82–60	(Georgia (country)) Goga Bitadze	(Serbia) Vlada Vukoičić
2018–19	(Croatia) Slavonski Brod	(Croatia) Cibona U19	(Serbia) Crvena zvezda U19	73–68	(Croatia) Roko Prkačin	(Croatia) Ivan Juran
2019–20	(Serbia) Belgrade	Canceled due to the COVID-19 pandemic			Not awarded	None
2020–21	(Serbia) Čajetina	(Serbia) Mega Soccerbet U19	(Montenegro) Budućnost VOLI U19	92–83	(Serbia) Nikola Jović	(Serbia) Dragoljub Avramović
2021–22	(Slovenia) Ljubljana	(Serbia) Mega Mozzart U19	(Montenegro) SC Derby U19	88–74	(Montenegro) Andrija Grbović	(Serbia) Dragoljub Avramović

== Records and statistics ==
=== By club ===
Club	Won	Runner-up	Years won	Years runner-up
(Serbia) Mega Basket	3	0	2018, 2021, 2022	—
(Croatia) Cibona	1	0	2019	—
(Serbia) Crvena zvezda	0	2	—	2018, 2019
(Montenegro) Budućnost	0	1	—	2021
(Montenegro) Studentski centar	0	1	—	2022

=== By country ===
Club / Nation	Won	Runner-up	Finals
Serbia	3	2	5
Croatia	1	0	1
Montenegro	0	2	2
Bosnia and Herzegovina	0	0	0
North Macedonia	0	0	0
Slovenia	0	0	0

== Awards ==
- Ideal Starting Five
- Most Valuable Player

== See also ==
- Euroleague Basketball Next Generation Tournament
- VTB United Youth League
