= 2022–23 KK Crvena zvezda season =

Club's 79th season

Crvena zvezda Meridianbet
2022-23 season
- Serbian League champions
- Serbian Cup champions
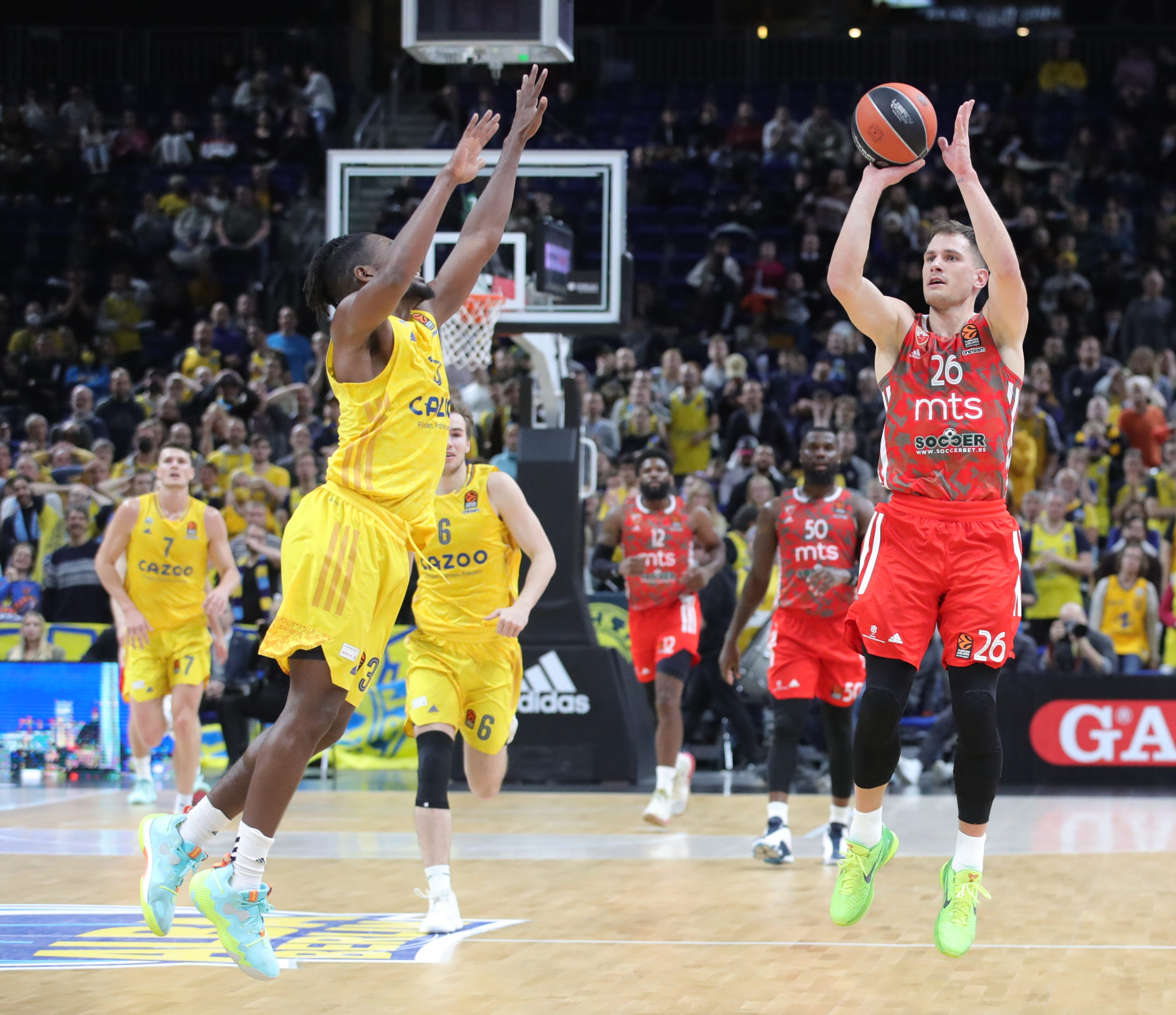
- Guard Nemanja Nedović shooting in a game against ALBA Berlin in November 2022
- President: (Serbia) Nebojša Čović
- Head coach: (Montenegro) Duško Ivanović
- Arena: Aleksandar Nikolić Hall
- ABA League: 2nd
- Playoffs: Runners-up
- Serbian League: Top seeded
- Playoffs: Champions
- EuroLeague: 10th
- Serbian Cup: Winner
- Highest home attendance: 8,300; 78–79 (Serbia) Partizan (27 January 2023)
- Lowest home attendance: 1,197; 83–77 (Serbia) FMP (24 October 2022)
- Average home attendance: 3728 (Adriatic League); 7324 (EuroLeague)
- Biggest win: +41; 56–97 (Montenegro) Budućnost VOLI (23 May 2023)
- Biggest defeat: –20; 59–79 (Spain) Real Madrid (10 January 2023)
Home	Away
- All statistics correct as of 12 January 2023.

The 2022–23 KK Crvena zvezda season was the 78th season in the existence of the club. For the season it was referred to as Crvena zvezda mts until 31 December 2022 and later on as Crvena zvezda Meridianbet for sponsorship reasons. The club was a two-time triple crown (ABA League, Serbian League, and Serbian Cup) defending champion.

== Overview ==
=== Pre-season ===
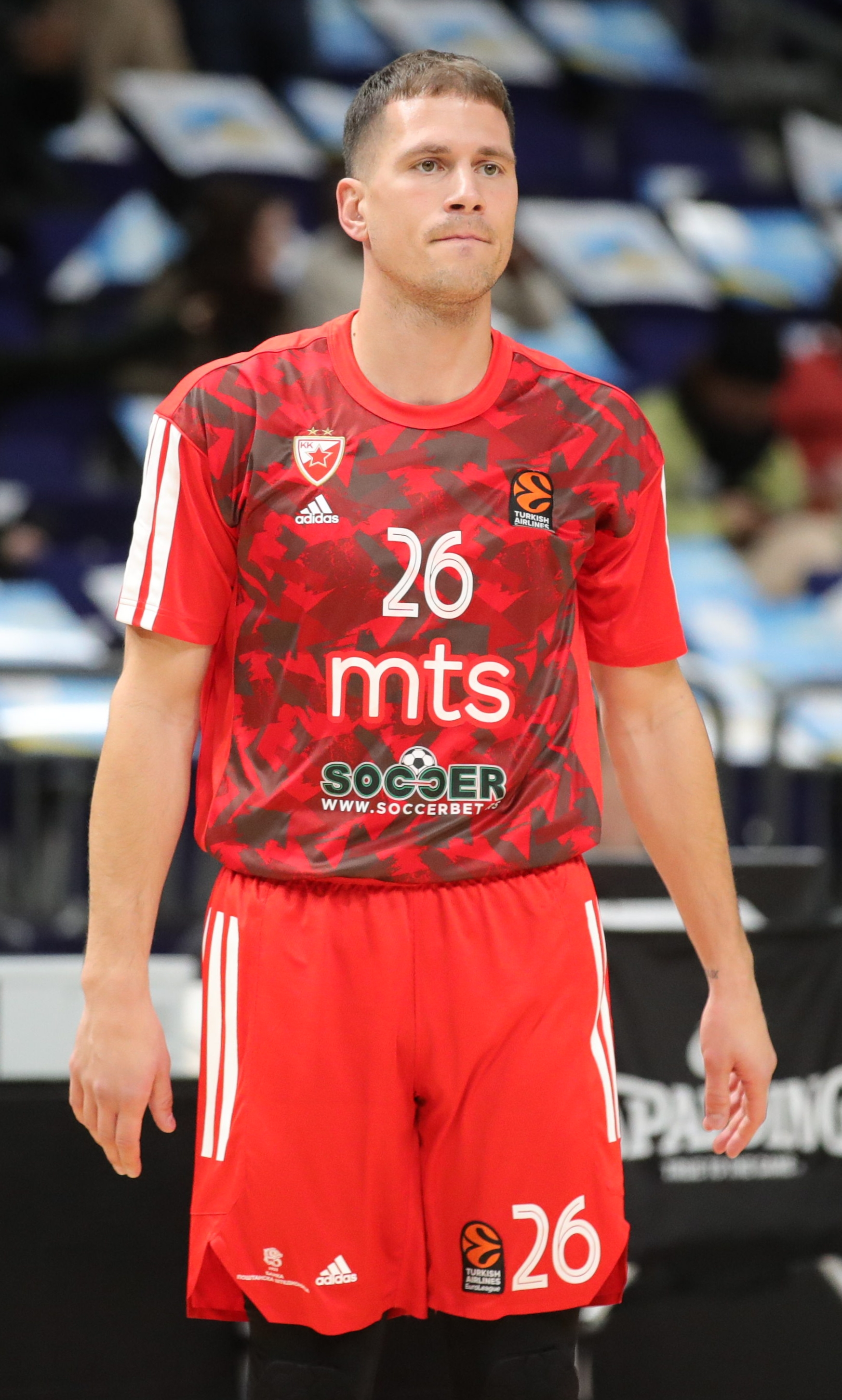
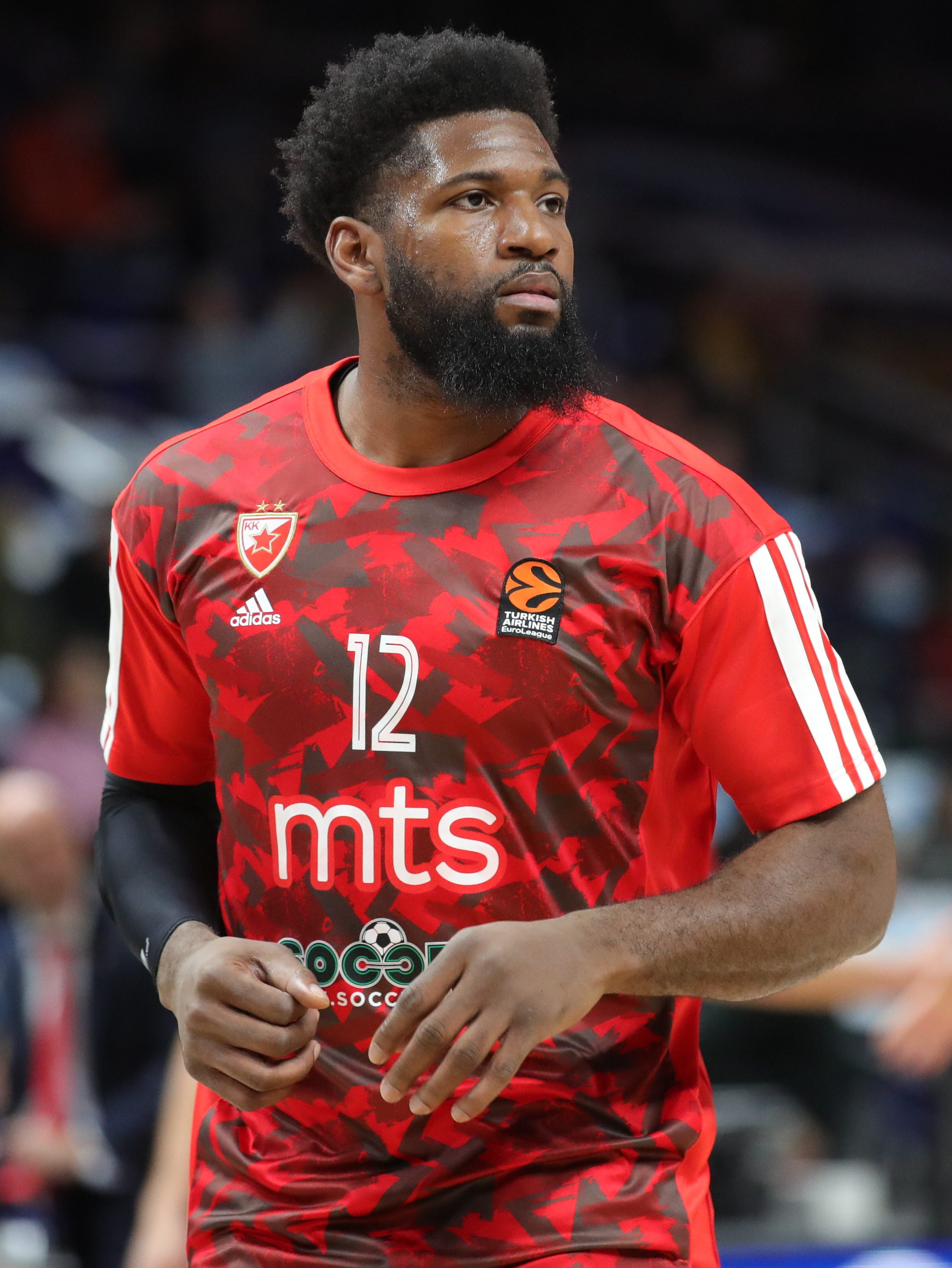
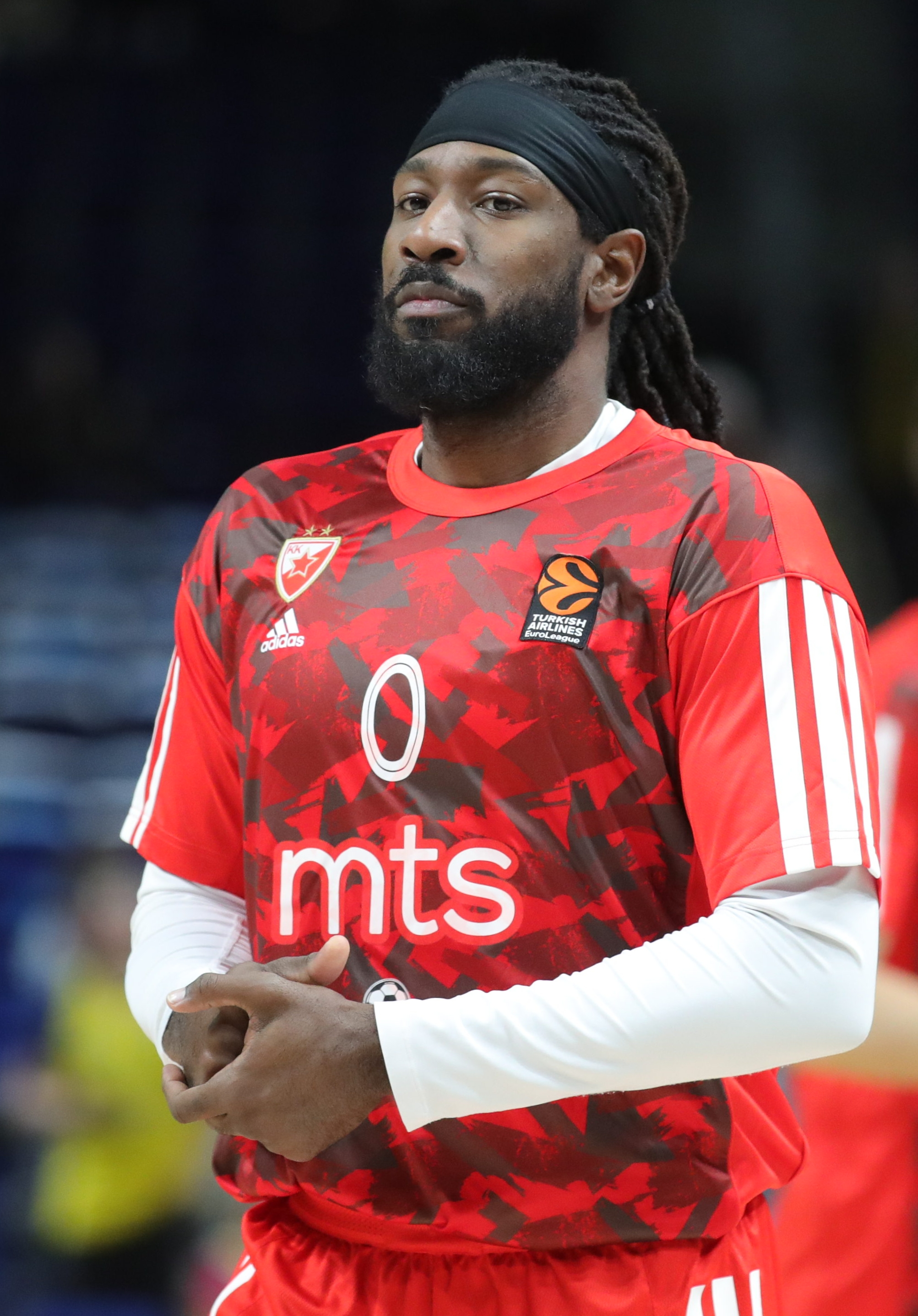
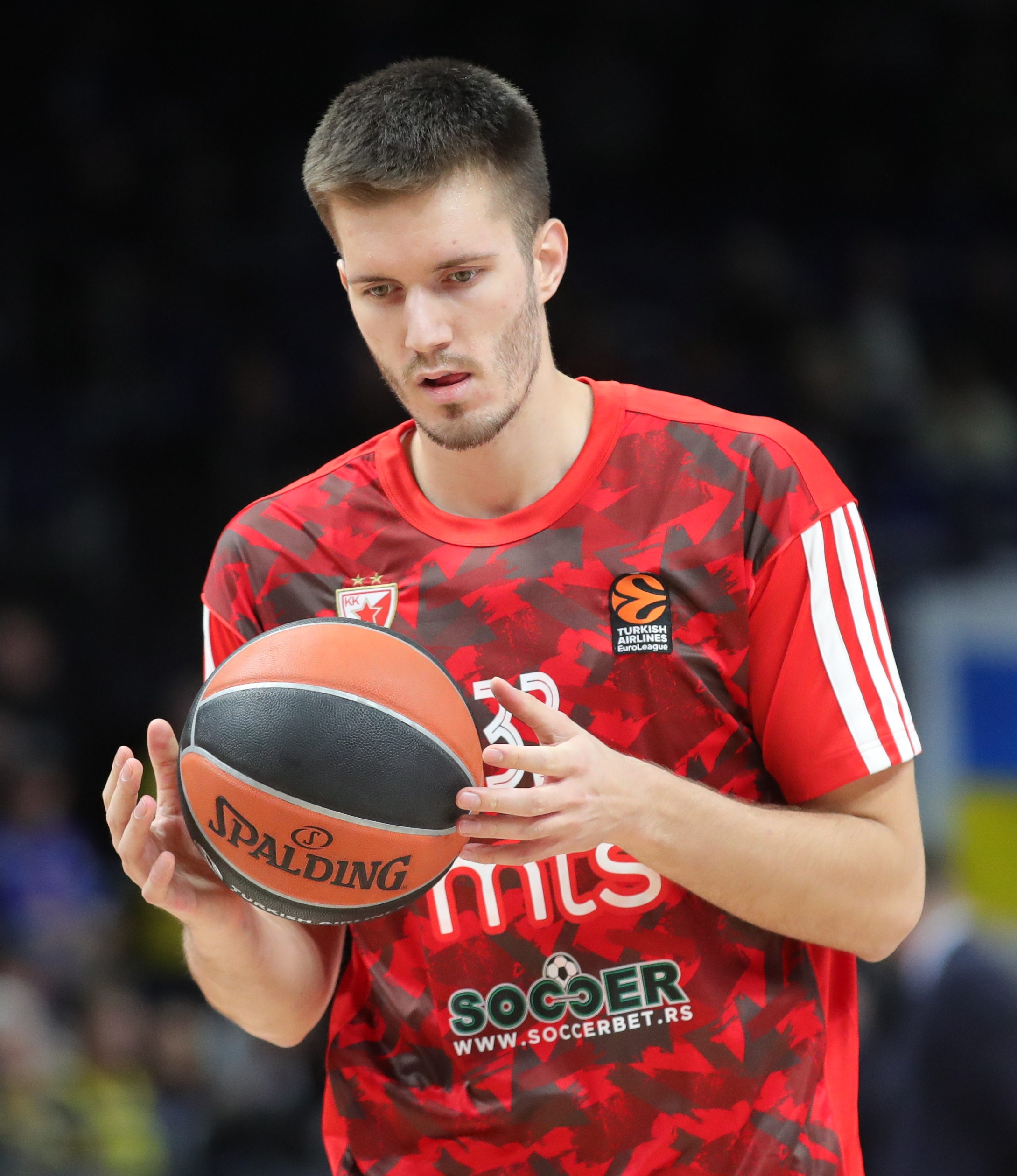
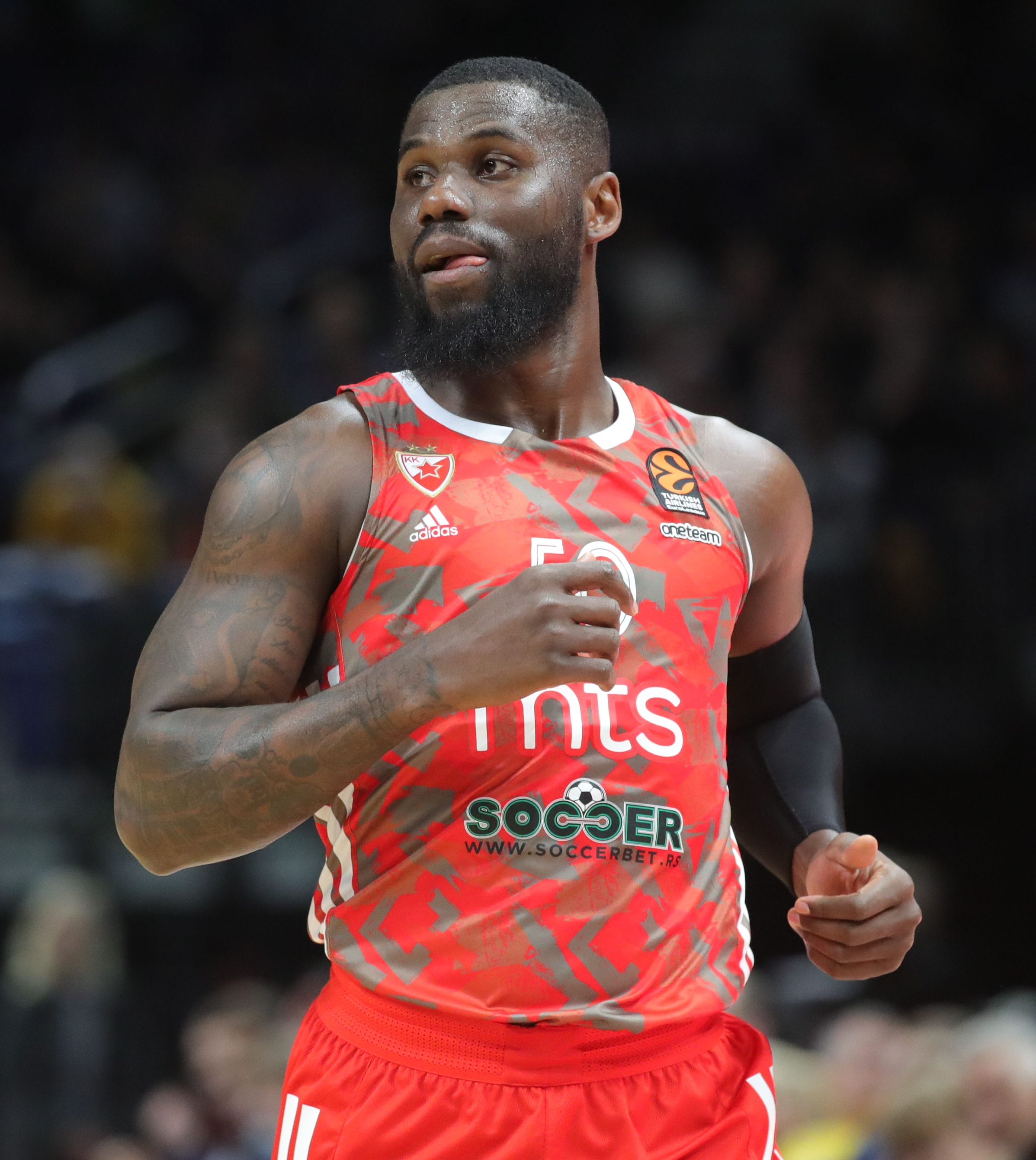
Nemanja Nedović (top left), Hassan Martin (top middle), John Holland (top right), Filip Petrušev (bottom left), and Ben Bentil (bottom right), as well as Dalibor Ilić and Jaylen Adams (both not pictured), joined the roster in July 2022.

Reportedly, Crvena zvezda expressed their interest to sign guards Lorenzo Brown, Shabazz Napier, Isaiah Taylor, Justin Cobbs, Pierriá Henry, Nemanja Nedović (ultimately signed on 7 July), Miloš Teodosić, Vladimir Mihailović, forwards Kostas Antetokounmpo, Dalibor Ilić (ultimately signed on 14 July), Nemanja Bjelica, and centers Miroslav Raduljica (ultimately signed on 28 September), Hassan Martin (ultimately signed on 9 July), Zoran Nikolić, Chris Singleton, and Boban Marjanović, among other free agents in the off-season.

On 21 June 2022, German center Maik Zirbes announced that he will be leaving the club as a free agent. This was his second spell at the club. On 26 June, Serbian international forward Dejan Davidovac left the club after his contract expired and joined Russian powerhouse CSKA Moscow. He spent five seasons with the Crvena zvezda winning three Adriatic leagues, four Serbian leagues, one Adriatic supercup and two Serbian cups. On 27 June, American guard Austin Hollins left the club after his contract expired and joined Israeli powerhouse Maccabi Tel Aviv.

On 30 June, the club parted ways with head coach Dejan Radonjić who agreed on a two-years deal with Greek club Panathinaikos after his contract with Crvena zvezda expired. This ended his second spell at the club which made him one of the most successful coaches in Crvena zvezda's history with 5 Serbian leagues, 5 Adriatic leagues and 5 Serbian cups and also a coach with most games coached in club's history. Reportedly, the club expressed their interest to sign head coaches Ioannis Sfairopoulos, Zoran Lukić, and Pablo Laso among others, following departure of Radonjić. Coach Laso declined the offer due to health issues.

On 7 July, the club brought in the first signing for upcoming season - Serbian international guard Nemanja Nedović and Olympics silver medalist from 2016 signed a three-years deal with the club after his contract with Greek side Panathinaikos expired. This will be his second spell with the Crvena zvezda, for whom he previously played between 2008 and 2012.

On 8 July, the club announced Vladimir Jovanović as their new head coach. Jovanović, who previously coached FMP and Cibona and is a current head coach of Serbia men's national under-20 basketball team, signed a three-years contract. On the same day, a club's veteran Marko Simonović announced his retirement as an active player and was instead hired as a new assistant coach. This ended his third spell with the club during which he won 13 titles in total.

Crvena zvezda announced that they have signed two-years-long contract with American center Hassan Martin who previously played for Greek powerhouse Olympiacos on 9 July. Three days later, on 12 July, they have signed a year-long contract with Puerto Rican swingman John Holland who previously played for Turkish side Frutti Extra Bursaspor. On 12 July, a Serbian forward Nikola Kalinić, who was Adriatic League regular season MVP and member of the Ideal Starting Five, left the club to join Spanish side FC Barcelona. This was his second spell with the club with whom he won 6 titles in total. On the other side, a team captain Branko Lazić signed a two-year contract extension on 13 July. On 14 July 2022, the club signed Bosnian-born and Serbia international forward Dalibor Ilić on a four-year contract. On 19 July 2022, the club signed their former youth system player and the 2022 EuroLeague champion center Filip Petrušev. On the next day, 20 July, club signed Ghanaian power forward Ben Bentil who spent previous season playing for Italian side Olimpia Milano. The seventh new player arrived on 29 July, when the club signed American point guard Jaylen Adams who arrived from NBL champions Sydney Kings.

On 26 August 2022, the team started with a training camp. The first roll call included guards Nikola Ivanović, Stefan Marković, Adams, Nikola Topić, and Holland, forwards Stefan Lazarević, Lazić, Ilić, Luka Mitrović, Lazar Gačić, Bentil, and Nemanja Popović, and centers Ognjen Kuzmić and Martin, as well as two promotions from their youth system, Filip Radaković (signed in June 2022) and Lazar Đoković (signed in April 2022). Players Ognjen Dobrić, Nedović, and Petrušev were with the Serbia EuroBasket team, while Aaron White will join later due to family obligations. Subsequently, Dobrić and Petrušev were cut from the 12-man roster, making Nedović the only player who played at EuroBasket 2022 and club decided to terminate contract with Aaron White.

Last signing during the pre-season was former Serbian international center and silver medalist from EuroBasket, World Cup and the Olympics Miroslav Raduljica who arrived at the club on 28 September and signed two-years-long contract. He signed as a free agent, having previously played for South Korean side Goyang Carrot Jumpers until he was waived in December 2021.

=== October ===
Club had a strong start in Adriatic league, winning its first 4 games of the season and ending the month on the fourth place in the league. On the other hand, in Euroleague, club won only one of the first five matches ending the month in 16th place.

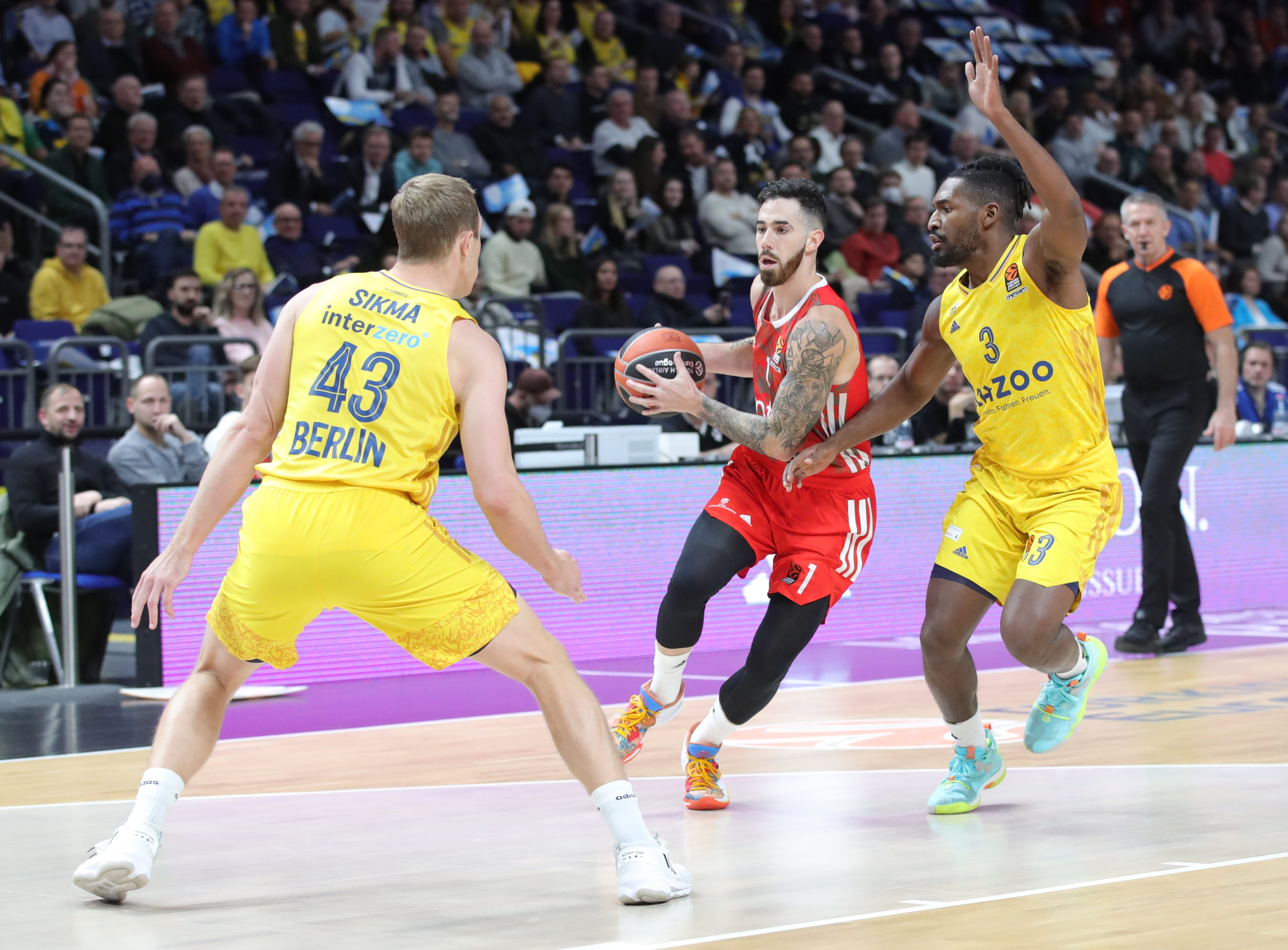
Guard Luca Vildoza playing against Alba Berlin.

On 14 October, club announced new signing - Argentine guard Luca Vildoza who previously played for Milwaukee Bucks. He signed two-years-long contract until 2024. At the end of the month he received ABA League Player of the Month Award.

=== November ===
In Adriatic League club played three more games, winning two of them and suffering first loss of the season in a home game against Zadar. This secured them third place in the league at the end of the month. While in Euroleague club played five more games, and won three of them, which brought them up to the 14th place at the end of the month.

On 3 November, just three months after arriving, the club parted ways with American point guard Jaylen Adams, who played only five games.

On 13 November, head coach Jovanović parted ways with the club. On the next day, the club hired Montenegrin coach Duško Ivanović as their new head coach. On 19 November, the club parted ways with Jovanović's assistant coaches Marko Simonović, Branko Jorović, and Miodrag Dinić following a hire of new head coach. On the next day, they have hired Spanish coach Carles Marco as new assistant coach.

=== December ===
During this month in Adriatic league club played and won four more games extending their winning run to six games. This secured them second place in the regular season at the end of December. In Euroleague club played six games, winning four and losing two of them. With these four wins club managed to climb to the tenth place of the regular season table at the end of the month. Argentinian guard Luca Vildoza was named EuroLeague MVP of the Month for this month. This was the second time that player from Crvena zvezda received this award, with the first one being Ognjen Kuzmić during the 2016–17 season

In early December, Crvena zvezda expressed their interest to sign Argentine NBA guard Facundo Campazzo, following his release from the Dallas Mavericks. Ultimately, he signed on 19 December for the club.

On 18 December, in a pre-game warm-up against Mega MIS, all Zvezda's players wore a t-shirt with a picture of Siniša Mihajlović with a title 'Legends Live Forever!', honoring him following his recent death. Mihajlović was a Crvena zvezda football player in the early 1990s.

By the end of December, the club expressed their interest to sign Italian power forward Achille Polonara.

=== January ===
Club managed to continue their good form in Adriatic league during the January, winning all five of games played and extending their unbeaten run to eleven games. This kept them on the second place of the table at the end of the month, with one game behind leading Partizan. Good form from the Adriatic league didn't extend to Euroleague this month. Zvezda played six games, winning two and losing four of them including derby against their rivals Partizan. This brought them down to 13th place on regular season table.

In EuroLeague, Filip Petrušev received MVP of the Round award for his 36 PIR in round 17th win against Valencia Basket.

On 4 January 2023, Euroleague Basketball's Finance Panel imposed sanction consisting of a prohibition to register new players and coaches until February 28, 2023, and a fine of €25,000 on the club for violations of the Financial Stability & Fair Play Regulations. This prohibition also applied to Facundo Campazzo who was previously signed by the club on 19 December 2022.

On 9 January 2023, the ABA League declined and cancelled a transfer of young guard Nikola Topić to FMP Meridian. Eventually, he moved to OKK Beograd.

=== February ===
On 14 February 2023, head coach Ivanović announced the 12-man roster for upcoming Radivoj Korać Cup in Niš, excluded guard Ivanović, forwards Ilić and Holland, and center Raduljica from the season roster.

On February 18th Crvena zvezda won Radivoj Korać Cup after defeating Mega MIS in the final 96-79. In quarterfinals, Zvezda defeated Borac Čačak, and then Partizan in the semifinals after comeback in the second half.

=== March ===
In Adriatic League, club played 3 games, winning one and losing two. They suffered a loss in Eternal derby against Partizan.

In Euroleague, club played 7 games, winning four and losing three. This results placed them on 11th position with 15-17 record.

=== April ===
In Adriatic League, club played 5 games and won all of them. After regular season, club finished in 2nd place with 23-3 record and was drawn in Playoffs quarterfinal against Zadar.

In Euroleague, club played 2 games and won both of them and finished season on 10th position with 17-17 record.

=== May ===
In Adriatic League, club played 3 games, one in quarterfinals against Zadar and two in semifinals against Budućnost VOLI. They won all the games and progressed to the Finals where they will face Partizan.

=== June ===
In Adriatic League, club lost in the Final against Partizan 3-2 in the series, failing to directly qualify to the Euroleague.

In Basketball League of Serbia, club played 2 games in the final against FMP and won both of them, thus winning the Serbian championship for the 8th time.

== Players ==
=== Current roster ===
Note: Flags indicate national team eligibility at FIBA-sanctioned events. Players may hold other non-FIBA nationalities not displayed.

Crvena zvezda Meridianbet roster
Players
Coaches

Pos.	No.	Nat.	Name	Ht.	Wt.	Age
PF	50	(Ghana)	Bentil, Ben	2.04 m (6 ft 8 in)	110 kg (243 lb)	28 – 29 March 1995
PG	7	(Argentina)	Campazzo, Facundo	1.78 m (5 ft 10 in)	88 kg (194 lb)	32 – 23 March 1991
G/F	13	(Serbia)	Dobrić, Ognjen	2.00 m (6 ft 7 in)	93 kg (205 lb)	28 – 27 October 1994
G/F	0	(Puerto Rico)	Holland, John	1.96 m (6 ft 5 in)	93 kg (205 lb)	34 – 6 November 1988
PF	22	(Serbia)	Ilić, Dalibor	2.06 m (6 ft 9 in)	94 kg (207 lb)	23 – 4 March 2000
PG	20	(Montenegro)	Ivanović, Nikola	1.90 m (6 ft 3 in)	85 kg (187 lb)	29 – 19 February 1994
C	32	(Serbia)	Kuzmić, Ognjen	2.14 m (7 ft 0 in)	116 kg (256 lb)	33 – 16 May 1990
G/F	2	(Serbia)	Lazarević, Stefan	2.00 m (6 ft 7 in)	100 kg (220 lb)	26 – 20 August 1996
G/F	10	(Serbia)	Lazić, Branko (C)	1.95 m (6 ft 5 in)	91 kg (201 lb)	34 – 12 January 1989
G	27	(Serbia)	Marković, Stefan	1.97 m (6 ft 6 in)	98 kg (216 lb)	35 – 25 April 1988
C	12	(United States)	Martin, Hassan	2.01 m (6 ft 7 in)	109 kg (240 lb)	27 – 22 November 1995
F/C	9	(Serbia)	Mitrović, Luka	2.06 m (6 ft 9 in)	107 kg (236 lb)	30 – 21 March 1993
SG	26	(Serbia)	Nedović, Nemanja	1.91 m (6 ft 3 in)	87 kg (192 lb)	32 – 16 June 1991
F/C	33	(Serbia)	Petrušev, Filip	2.11 m (6 ft 11 in)	107 kg (236 lb)	23 – 15 April 2000
C	15	(Serbia)	Raduljica, Miroslav	2.13 m (7 ft 0 in)	113 kg (249 lb)	35 – 5 January 1988
G	1	(Argentina)	Vildoza, Luca	1.91 m (6 ft 3 in)	86 kg (190 lb)	27 – 11 August 1995

Head coach

- (Montenegro) Duško Ivanović

Assistant coach(es)

- (Spain) Carles Marco
- (Serbia) Nenad Jakovljević

Strength & conditioning coach(es)

- (Serbia) Vladan Radonjić

Team manager

- (Serbia) Nebojša Ilić

Legend

- (C) Team captain
- Injured

- Roster
- Transactions
Updated: 12 January 2023

=== Players with multiple nationalities ===
- (Ghana) (United States) Ben Bentil
- (Puerto Rico) (United States) John Holland
- (Serbia) (Bosnia and Herzegovina) Dalibor Ilić
- (Serbia) (Bosnia and Herzegovina) Ognjen Kuzmić
- (Argentina) (Italy) Luca Vildoza

=== Depth chart ===
Pos.	Starting 5	Bench 1	Bench 2	Reserves
C	Hassan Martin	Luka Mitrović	Ognjen Kuzmić	Miroslav Raduljica
PF	Ben Bentil	Filip Petrušev		Dalibor Ilić
SF	Ognjen Dobrić	Stefan Lazarević		John Holland
SG	Nemanja Nedović	Branko Lazić
PG	Facundo Campazzo	Luca Vildoza	Stefan Marković	Nikola Ivanović

=== On loan ===
The following players have been on loan during the 2022–23 season and have professional contracts signed with the club.

KK Crvena zvezda players out on loan
Nat.	Player	Position	Team	On loan since
(Serbia)	Milutin Vujičić	PG	(Serbia) FMP	May 2021
(Serbia)	Nikola Manojlović	SG/SF	(Serbia) FMP	December 2021
(Serbia)	Aleksa Uskoković	PG	(Serbia) Mega MIS	December 2021
(Serbia)	Filip Branković	C	(Serbia) SPD Radnički	September 2022
(Serbia)	Lazar Vasić	PG	(Serbia) Vršac	September 2022
(Serbia)	Filip Radaković	SG/SF	(Serbia) Mladost MaxBet	September 2022
(Serbia)	Lazar Đoković	PF	(Serbia) Mladost MaxBet	September 2022
(Serbia)	Marko Mihailović	SG	(Serbia) Tamiš	September 2022
(Serbia)	Nikola Topić	PG	(Serbia) OKK Beograd	January 2023

Under contract, not assigned

The following players are under a professional contract with the club

- Nemanja Popović
- Marko Gušić

=== Transactions ===
==== Players In ====
No.	Pos.	Nat.	Name	Age	Moving from		Type	Ends	Date	Source
26	G	(Serbia)	Nemanja Nedović	31	Panathinaikos	(Greece)	End of contract	2025	7 July 2022	
12	F/C	(United States)	Hassan Martin	26	Olympiacos	(Greece)	End of contract	2024	9 July 2022	
0	G/F	(Puerto Rico)	John Holland	33	Frutti Extra Bursaspor	(Turkey)	End of contract	2023	12 July 2022	
22	F	(Serbia)	Dalibor Ilić	22	Igokea m:tel	(Bosnia and Herzegovina)	End of contract	2026	14 July 2022	
33	F/C	(Serbia)	Filip Petrušev	22	Anadolu Efes	(Turkey)	End of contract	2023	19 July 2022	
50	PF	(Ghana)	Ben Bentil	27	Olimpia Milano	(Italy)	End of contract	2023	20 July 2022	
3	PG	(United States)	Jaylen Adams	26	Sydney Kings	(Australia)	End of contract	2023	29 July 2022	
15	C	(Serbia)	Miroslav Raduljica	34	Goyang Carrot Jumpers	(South Korea)	Waived	2024	28 September 2022	
1	G	(Argentina)	Luca Vildoza	27	Milwaukee Bucks	(United States)	End of contract	2024	14 October 2022	
7	PG	(Argentina)	Facundo Campazzo	31	Dallas Mavericks	(United States)	Waived	2024	19 December 2022	

==== Players Out ====
No.	Pos.	Nat.	Name	Age	Moving to		Type	Date	Source
33	C	(Germany)	Maik Zirbes	32	Benfica	(Portugal)	End of contract	21 June 2022	
7	SF	(Serbia)	Dejan Davidovac	27	CSKA Moscow	(Russia)	End of contract	26 June 2022	
14	SG	(United States)	Austin Hollins	30	Maccabi Tel Aviv	(Israel)	End of contract	27 June 2022	
6	SG	(Serbia)	Luka Vudragović	18	FMP	(Serbia)	Parted ways	28 June 2022	
21	SF	(Serbia)	Ognjen Matović	17	FMP	(Serbia)	Unattached	28 June 2022	
15	F/C	(Serbia)	Andrija Vuković	17	FMP	(Serbia)	Unattached	28 June 2022	
19	SF	(Serbia)	Marko Simonović	35	Retired		End of contract	8 July 2022	
12	F	(Serbia)	Nikola Kalinić	30	FC Barcelona	(Spain)	End of contract	12 July 2022	
3	PG	(United States)	Nate Wolters	31	Panathinaikos	(Greece)	End of contract	15 July 2022	
–	G	(Serbia)	Arijan Lakić	22	Zadar	(Croatia)	End of contract (Note: Lakić was loaned to Spars Ilidža for the 2021–22 season.)	21 July 2022	
–	F/C	(Montenegro)	Filip Anđušić	20	Podgorica	(Montenegro)	Parted ways (Note: Anđušić was loaned to Slodes for the 2021–22 season.)	26 July 2022	
30	PF	(United States)	Aaron White	29	Budućnost VOLI	(Montenegro)	Parted ways	6 September 2022	
3	PG	(United States)	Jaylen Adams	26	Qingdao Eagles	(China)	Parted ways	3 November 2022	
44	PG	(Serbia)	Nikola Topić	17	OKK Beograd	(Serbia)	Loan	10 January 2023	

== Club ==
=== Technical Staff ===
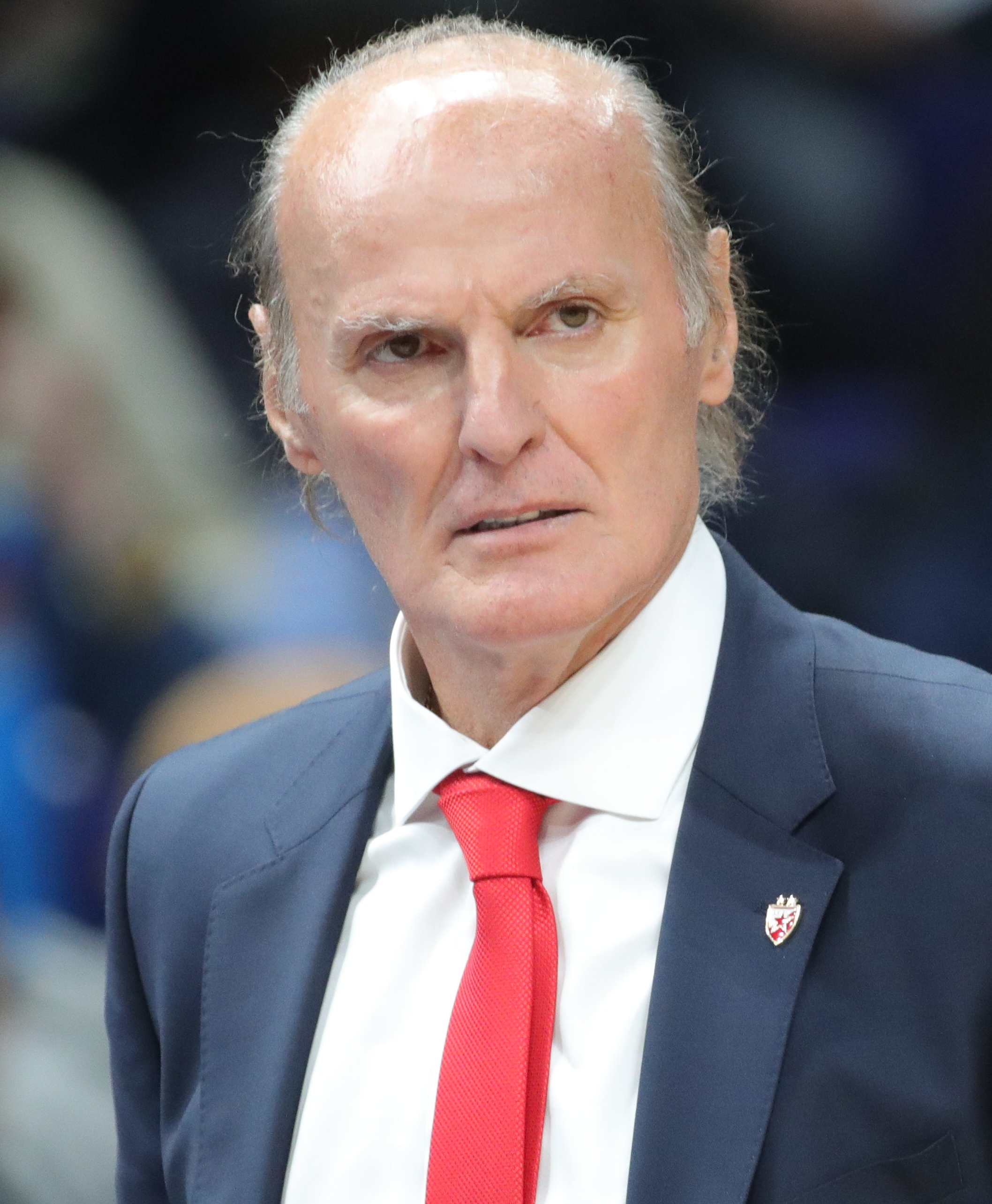
In November 2022, Crvena zvezda hired Montenegrin coach Duško Ivanović as their new head coach.

On 8 July 2022, Crvena zvezda hired Vladimir Jovanović as their new head coach. The club also added a 2021–22 club's roster member Marko Simonović to the coaching staff as an assistant coach. Assistant coaches Goran Bošković, Nikola Birač, Saša Kosović, and Aleksandar Lukman (conditioning coach) left the coaching staff following the change of the head coach. On 9 July, the club added Branko Jorović to the Jovanović's coaching staff. In July 2022, the club added Vladan Radonjić as their new strength and conditioning coach.

On 13 November 2022, head coach Jovanović parted ways with the club. On the next day, the club hired Montenegrin coach Duško Ivanović as their new head coach. On 19 November, the club parted ways with Jovanović's assistant coaches Marko Simonović, Branko Jorović, and Miodrag Dinić following a hire of new head coach. On the next day, they have hired Spanish coach Carles Marco as new assistant coach.

The following is the technical staff of Crvena zvezda for the 2022–23 season.

Position	Staff member
General Manager	(Serbia) Nemanja Vasiljević
Team Manager	(Serbia) Nebojša Ilić
Head Coach	(Montenegro) Duško Ivanović
Assistant Coaches	(Spain) Carles Marco
Assistant Coaches	(Serbia) Nenad Jakovljević
Conditioning Coaches	(Serbia) Vladan Radonjić
Conditioning Coaches	(Serbia) Igor Tomašević
Physiotherapists	(Serbia) Milorad Ćirić
Physiotherapists	(Serbia) Todor Galić
Physiotherapists	(Serbia) Miljan Nićiforović
Team physicians	(Serbia) Nebojša Mitrović
Team physicians	(Serbia) Boris Gluščević

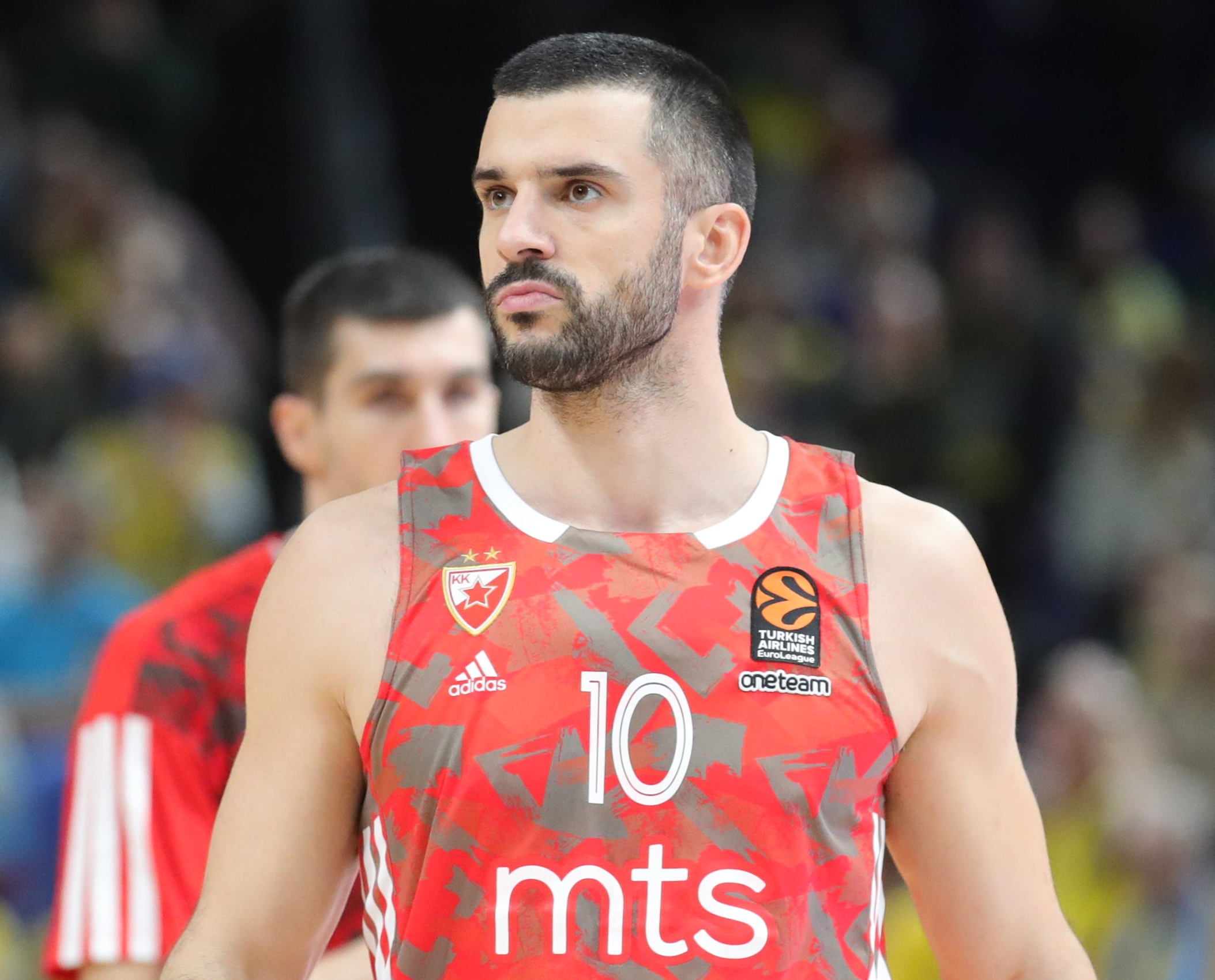
Team captain Branko Lazić wearing the third uniform.

=== Uniform ===
Crvena zvezda unveiled their new Adidas uniforms for the 2022–23 season on 26 September 2020, on the EuroLeague Media Day.

The following is a list of corporate sponsorship patches on a uniform of Crvena zvezda and uniform designs for the 2022–23 season.

- Supplier: Adidas
- Main sponsors: Meridian, mts
- Left shoulder sponsor: Dunav osiguranje
- Back sponsors: Soccerbet (above number), Idea (below number)
- Shorts sponsor (right leg): Carnex (big), Banka Poštanska štedionica (small)

Home	Away	Third

== Pre-season and friendlies ==
Crvena zvezda is scheduled to play seven pre-season games. The first two games were played in Belgrade. Then, they were participated at a tournament in Antalya, Turkey, from 14 to 18 September 2022. Furthermore, the team is scheduled to play at the 2022 Neofytos Chandriotis Basketball Tournament (NCBT) together with Peristeri, Olympiacos, and Hapoel Holon in Nicosia, Cyprus, from 23 to 24 September 2022.

Win Loss

6 September 2022 1	Crvena zvezda mts (Serbia)	92–57	(Serbia) Dynamic Balkan Bet	Belgrade
N/A	Scoring by quarter: 16–18, 27–15, 23–19, 26–5
	Pts: Bentil 15; Rebs: Martin 7 Asts: Adams 6 PIR: not available	Boxscore	Pts: not available Rebs: not available Asts: not available PIR: not available	Arena: Aleksandar Nikolić Hall; Attendance: Behind closed doors Referees: not available

9 September 2022 2	Crvena zvezda mts (Serbia)	92–64	(Romania) U-BT Cluj-Napoca	Belgrade
N/A	Scoring by quarter: 27–17, 25–16, 17–20, 23–11
	Pts: Holland 27; Rebs: Petrušev 6 Asts: Topić 6 PIR: not available	Boxscore	Pts: not available Rebs: not available Asts: not available PIR: not available	Arena: Aleksandar Nikolić Hall; Attendance: Behind closed doors Referees: not available

14 September 2022 3	Crvena zvezda mts (Serbia)	88–93	AS Monaco	Antalya
N/A	Scoring by quarter: 20–24, 20–23, 23–30, 25–16
	Pts: Dobrić 18; Rebs: Lazarević 5 Asts: Marković 4 PIR: not available	Boxscore	Pts: James 20; Rebs: Blossomgame 6 Asts: Loyd 7 PIR: not available	Arena: Gloria Sports Arena; Attendance: not available Referees: not available

16 September 2022 4	Crvena zvezda mts (Serbia)	72–71	(Russia) Enisey	Antalya
18:30	Scoring by quarter: 19–17, 19–21, 13–20, 21–13
	Pts: Mitrović 24; Rebs: not available Asts: not available PIR: not available	Boxscore	Pts: not available Rebs: not available Asts: not available PIR: not available	Arena: Gloria Sports Arena; Attendance: not available Referees: not available

18 September 2022 5	Crvena zvezda mts (Serbia)	73–69	(Russia) Lokomotiv Kuban	Antalya
N/A	Scoring by quarter: 17–17, 25–17, 18–21, 13–14
	Pts: three players 11; Rebs: not available Asts: not available PIR: not available	Boxscore	Pts: Barford 13; Rebs: not available Asts: not available PIR: not available	Arena: Gloria Sports Arena; Attendance: not available Referees: not available

23 September 2022 6 / NCBT	Crvena zvezda mts (Serbia)	73–72	(Greece) Peristeri	Nicosia
18:00 (EET)	Scoring by quarter: 21–16, 17–15, 21–22, 14–19
	Pts: Dobrić 16; Rebs: Bentil 9 Asts: Adams, Dobrić 4 PIR: not available	Boxscore	Pts: Francisco 14; Rebs: Davis 6 Asts: Francisco 7 PIR: not available	Arena: Tassos Papadopoulos Eleftheria Hall; Attendance: not available Referees: Oļegs Latiševs, Piotr Pastusiak, Alberto Baena Arroyo

24 September 2022 7 / NCBT	Olympiacos (Greece)	94–55	(Serbia) Crvena zvezda mts	Nicosia
18:00 (EET)	Scoring by quarter: 24–13, 23–24, 27–12, 20–6
	Pts: Vezenkov 19; Rebs: Bolomboy 9 Asts: Larentzakis 6 PIR: Vezenkov 24	Boxscore	Pts: Mitrović 12; Rebs: Bentil 5 Asts: Mitrović, Holland 3 PIR: Mitrović 19	Arena: Tassos Papadopoulos Eleftheria Hall; Attendance: not available Referees: not available

== Competitions ==
=== Overall ===
Competition	Started round	Final position / round	First match	Last match
Adriatic League	Matchday 1	Runner-up	1 October 2022	22 June 2023
EuroLeague	Matchday 1	10th	7 October 2022	13 April 2023
Serbian League	Finals	Champions	9 June 2023	11 June 2023
Radivoj Korać Cup	Quarterfinals	Champions	16 February 2023	18 February 2023

Updated to match played 22 June 2023
Source: Competitions

=== Overview ===
Competition	Record							
Competition	Pld	W	D	L	PF	PA	PD	Win %
Adriatic League	26	23	0	3	2,262	1,890	+372	88.46
Adriatic League Playoffs	9	6	0	3	766	652	+114	66.67
EuroLeague	34	17	0	17	2,591	2,613	−22	50.00
Basketball League of Serbia Playoffs	2	2	0	0	176	142	+34	100.00
Radivoj Korać Cup	3	3	0	0	268	218	+50	100.00
Total	74	51	0	23	6,063	5,515	+548	68.92

Last updated: 22 June 2023
Source: Competitions

=== Adriatic League ===
==== Regular season ====
Pos	Team	Pld	W	L	PF	PA	PD	Pts	Qualification or relegation
1	(Basketball Federation of Serbia) Partizan Mozzart Bet	26	24	2	2424	2025	+399	50	Advance to the Playoffs
2	(Basketball Federation of Serbia) Crvena zvezda Meridianbet	26	23	3	2262	1890	+372	49	Advance to the Playoffs
3	(Basketball Federation of Montenegro) Budućnost VOLI	26	18	8	2263	2027	+236	44	Advance to the Playoffs
4	(Basketball Federation of Slovenia) Cedevita Olimpija	26	17	9	2205	2068	+137	43	Advance to the Playoffs
5	(Basketball Federation of Serbia) FMP Meridian	26	14	12	2339	2245	+94	40	Advance to the Playoffs

Source: ABA League

==== Results summary ====
Overall						Home					Away				
Pld	W	L	PF	PA	PD	W	L	PF	PA	PD	W	L	PF	PA	PD
18	17	1	1582	1274	+308	10	1	992	792	+200	7	0	590	482	+108

Last updated: 12 February 2023.
Source: Competitive matches

==== Results by round ====
Round	1	2	3	4	5	6	7	8	9	10	11	12	13	14	15	16	17	18	19	20	21	22	23	24	25	26
Ground	H	H	A	H	A	H	H	H	A	H	H	H	A	A	A	H	A	H	A	A	A	H	A	A	A	H
Result	W	W	W	W	W	L	W	W	W	W	W	W	W	W	W	W	W	W	W	L	L	W	W	W	W	W
Position	4	3	8	6	4	6	3	3	3	3	2	2	2	2	2	2	2	2	2	2	2	2	2	2	2	2

Last updated: 3 April 2023.
Source: Competitive matches
Ground: A = Away; H = Home; R = Rest. Result: L = Loss; W = Win; R = Rest; P = Postponed.

Win Loss

==== Matches ====
Note: All times are CET (UTC+1). The club changed its sponsoring name on 1 January 2023.

1 October 2022 1	Crvena zvezda mts (Basketball Federation of Serbia)	87–67	(Basketball Federation of North Macedonia) MZT Skopje Aerodrom	Belgrade
20:00	Scoring by quarter: 13–9, 26–13, 26–25, 22–20
	Pts: Adams 16; Rebs: three players 5 Asts: Marković, Ivanović 5 PIR: Ivanović 19	Boxscore	Pts: Stojanovski 17; Rebs: Yigitoglu 14; Asts: Magdevski 5 PIR: Stojanovski 19	Arena: Aleksandar Nikolić Hall; Attendance: 2,839; Referees: Tomislav Hordov, Miloš Koljenšić, Marko Mustapić

10 October 2022 2 (Rivalry)	Crvena zvezda mts (Basketball Federation of Serbia)	69–65	(Basketball Federation of Montenegro) Budućnost VOLI	Belgrade
18:00	Scoring by quarter: 20–19, 23–16, 12–16, 14–14
	Pts: Bentil 16; Rebs: Mitrović 9 Asts: Ivanović 7 PIR: Mitrović 21	Boxscore	Pts: Drobnjak 19; Rebs: Jagodić-Kuridža 11; Asts: Bell-Haynes 3 PIR: Drobnjak 16	Arena: Aleksandar Nikolić Hall; Attendance: 3,789; Referees: Saša Pukl, Damir Javor, Josip Radojković

24 April 2023 3	Cedevita Olimpija (Basketball Federation of Slovenia)	70–84	(Basketball Federation of Serbia) Crvena zvezda mts	Ljubljana
18:00	Scoring by quarter: 10-19, 20-24, 22-23, 18-18
	Pts: Alibegović 12; Rebs: Dragić 6 Asts: Gnjidić 7 PIR: Gnjidić 13	Boxscore	Pts: Ivanović 29; Rebs: Lazarević 7 Asts: Ivanović, Marković 5 PIR: Ivanović 37	Arena: Arena Stožice; Attendance: 5129; Referees: Damir Javor, Tomislav Hordov, Luka Kardum

24 October 2022 4	Crvena zvezda mts (Basketball Federation of Serbia)	83–77	(Basketball Federation of Serbia) FMP Meridian	Belgrade
18:00	Scoring by quarter: 24–25, 27–15, 17–22, 15–15
	Pts: Ivanović 22; Rebs: Marković 6 Asts: Marković 4 PIR: Ivanović 30	Boxscore	Pts: Frazier 27; Rebs: Janković 7 Asts: Frazier 6 PIR: Frazier 27	Arena: Aleksandar Nikolić Hall; Attendance: 1,197; Referees: Uroš Obrknežević, Vladimir Vesković, Marko Pecelj

31 October 2022 5	Igokea m:tel (Basketball Federation of Bosnia and Herzegovina)	70–76	(Basketball Federation of Serbia) Crvena zvezda mts	Laktaši
18:00	Scoring by quarter: 18–23, 17–18, 20–18, 15–17
	Pts: Ray 24; Rebs: Stephens 13; Asts: Crawford 8 PIR: Ray 25	Boxscore	Pts: Vildoza 19; Rebs: Petrušev 8 Asts: Vildoza 9 PIR: Vildoza 28	Arena: Laktaši Sports Hall; Attendance: 2,500; Referees: Damir Javor, Sašo Petek, Josip Radojković

7 November 2022 6	Crvena zvezda mts (Basketball Federation of Serbia)	96–98	(Croatian Basketball Federation) Zadar	Belgrade
18:00	Scoring by quarter: 19–27, 22–25, 25–23, 30–23
	Pts: Bentil 19; Rebs: Bentil 9 Asts: Vildoza 11; PIR: Vildoza 27	Boxscore	Pts: Jordano 23; Rebs: Davis, Ramljak 7 Asts: Ramljak 6 PIR: Ramljak 29	Arena: Aleksandar Nikolić Hall; Attendance: 1,587; Referees: Milivoje Jovčić, Tomislav Vovk, Nermin Nikšić

19 November 2022 7	Crvena zvezda mts (Basketball Federation of Serbia)	92–53	(Croatian Basketball Federation) Cibona	Belgrade
16:00	Scoring by quarter: 21–20, 29–18, 22–8, 20–7
	Pts: Nedović 24; Rebs: Petrušev 9 Asts: Ivanović 6 PIR: Nedović 30	Boxscore	Pts: Aranitović 10; Rebs: Aranitović 6 Asts: Kapusta 4 PIR: Aranitović, Bundović 13	Arena: Aleksandar Nikolić Hall; Attendance: 2,321; Referees: Uroš Nikolić, Gordan Terlević, Aleksandar Davidov

28 November 2022 8 (Rivalry)	Crvena zvezda mts (Serbia)	90–74	(Serbia) Partizan Mozzart Bet	Belgrade
20:00	Scoring by quarter: 20–18, 29–30, 21–17, 20–9
Arena Sport	Pts: Vildoza 19; Rebs: Petrušev 5 Asts: Vildoza, Nedović 5 PIR: Nedović 23	Boxscore	Pts: Papapetrou 15; Rebs: LeDay 8 Asts: Exum 4 PIR: Exum 17	Arena: Aleksandar Nikolić Hall; Attendance: 7,464; Referees: Damir Javor, Josip Radojković, Marko Mustapić

4 December 2022 9	SC Derby (Basketball Federation of Montenegro)	76–92	(Basketball Federation of Serbia) Crvena zvezda mts	Podgorica
17:00	Scoring by quarter: 21–26, 18–23, 28–19, 9–24
	Pts: Jackson 15; Rebs: T. Ivišić, Z. Ivišić 6 Asts: Jackson 8 PIR: Jackson 22	Boxscore	Pts: Nedović 16; Rebs: Martin 5 Asts: Vildoza 4 PIR: Nedović 17	Arena: Morača Sports Center; Attendance: 1,560; Referees: Milan Nedović, Aleksandar Davidov, Denis Hadžić

10 December 2022 10	Crvena zvezda mts (Basketball Federation of Serbia)	93–77	(Basketball Federation of Montenegro) Mornar Barsko zlato	Belgrade
17:00	Scoring by quarter: 25–22, 27–14, 19–26, 22–15
	Pts: Bentil 26; Rebs: Ilić 8 Asts: Vildoza 6 PIR: Bentil 27	Boxscore	Pts: Russell 35; Rebs: Pecarski 11; Asts: Russell 5 PIR: Russell 29	Arena: Aleksandar Nikolić Hall; Attendance: 2,659; Referees: Igor Dragojević, Bojan Kruljac, Tomislav Stapić

19 December 2022 11	Crvena zvezda mts (Basketball Federation of Serbia)	92–58	(Basketball Federation of Serbia) Mega MIS	Belgrade
18:00	Scoring by quarter: 25–16, 19–17, 18–18, 30–7
	Pts: Nedović 16; Rebs: Mitrović 11; Asts: Dobrić, Marković 5 PIR: Dobrić, Petrušev 18	Boxscore	Pts: Branković 13; Rebs: Branković, Grbović 6 Asts: Rorie 6 PIR: Branković 18	Arena: Aleksandar Nikolić Hall; Attendance: 1,896; Referees: Sašo Petek, Mario Majkić, Tomislav Vovk

26 December 2022 12	Crvena zvezda mts (Basketball Federation of Serbia)	86–57	(Basketball Federation of Serbia) Borac Mozzart	Belgrade
17:00	Scoring by quarter: 23–13, 22–24, 20–8, 21–12
	Pts: Dobrić 15; Rebs: Mitrović, Petrušev 6 Asts: Vildoza, Campazzo 5 PIR: three players 18	Boxscore	Pts: Hale 17; Rebs: Milovanović 6 Asts: Hale, Novaković 4 PIR: Hale, Milovanović 12	Arena: Aleksandar Nikolić Hall; Attendance: 6,874; Referees: Ilija Belošević, Ivan Stefanović, Stefan Ćalić

2 January 2023 13	Split (Croatian Basketball Federation)	63–72	(Basketball Federation of Serbia) Crvena zvezda Meridianbet	Split
16:30	Scoring by quarter: 17–19, 13–13, 14–26, 19–14
	Pts: Sullivan 18; Rebs: Sullivan 8 Asts: Kalajžić, Shorter 3 PIR: Sullivan 21	Boxscore	Pts: Bentil 12; Rebs: Ilić 9 Asts: Campazzo 4 PIR: Bentil 13	Arena: Arena Gripe; Attendance: 2,500; Referees: Saša Pukl, Josip Radojković, Ernad Karović

8 January 2023 14	MZT Skopje Aerodrom (Basketball Federation of North Macedonia)	57–80	(Basketball Federation of Serbia) Crvena zvezda Meridianbet	Skopje
17:00	Scoring by quarter: 15–17, 18–19, 8–27, 16–17
	Pts: Ware 16; Rebs: Mićović 5 Asts: Ware 5 PIR: Ware 17	Boxscore	Pts: Campazzo 23; Rebs: Campazzo 7 Asts: Campazzo 9 PIR: Campazzo 33	Arena: Jane Sandanski Arena; Attendance: 5,320; Referees: Luka Kardum, Mario Majkić, Marko Mustapić

15 January 2023 15 (Rivalry)	Budućnost VOLI (Basketball Federation of Montenegro)	56–76	(Basketball Federation of Serbia) Crvena zvezda Meridianbet	Podgorica
19:30	Scoring by quarter: 12–19, 13–18, 18–16, 13–23
	Pts: Green 14; Rebs: O'Brien 7 Asts: Six players 1 PIR: O'Brien 17	Boxscore	Pts: Mitrović 21; Rebs: Lazarević 6 Asts: Campazzo 12; PIR: Campazzo 34	Arena: Morača Sports Center; Attendance: 5,200; Referees: Damir Javor, Sašo Petek, Tomislav Stapić

23 January 2023 16	Crvena zvezda Meridianbet (Basketball Federation of Serbia)	100–95	(Basketball Federation of Slovenia) Cedevita Olimpija	Belgrade
18:00	Scoring by quarter: 26–23, 29–26, 29–23, 16–23
	Pts: Campazzo 19; Rebs: Petrušev 7 Asts: Vildoza 6 PIR: Campazzo, Vildoza 21	Boxscore	Pts: Ferrell 24; Rebs: Omić 9 Asts: Rebec 8 PIR: Ferrell 32	Arena: Aleksandar Nikolić Hall; Attendance: 6,000; Referees: Tomislav Hordov, Luka Kardum, Bojan Kruljac

29 January 2023 17	FMP Meridian (Basketball Federation of Serbia)	84–99	(Basketball Federation of Serbia) Crvena zvezda Meridianbet	Belgrade
21:00	Scoring by quarter: 19–24, 23–30, 24–24, 18–21
	Pts: Valinskas 22; Rebs: Manojlović 5 Asts: Valinskas 5 PIR: Valinskas 20	Boxscore	Pts: Ilić 16; Rebs: Lazarević 4 Asts: Campazzo 6 PIR: Dobrić, Lazarević 19	Arena: Železnik Hall; Attendance: 2,342; Referees: Marko Juras, Marko Pecelj, Miloš Hadžić

5 February 2023 18	Crvena zvezda Meridianbet (Basketball Federation of Serbia)	104–71	(Basketball Federation of Bosnia and Herzegovina) Igokea m:tel	Belgrade
16:30	Scoring by quarter: 27-11, 34-19, 20-11, 23-30
	Pts: Nedović 20; Rebs: Petrušev 10; Asts: Marković 6 PIR: Ilić, Petrušev 21	Boxscore	Pts: Tanasković 17; Rebs: Tanasković 8 Asts: Tanasković, Kondić, Nerandžić 3 PIR: Tanasković 26	Arena: Aleksandar Nikolić Hall; Attendance: 4,387; Referees: Dragan Porobić, Radoš Arsenijević, Tomislav Stapić

12 February 2023 19	Zadar (Croatian Basketball Federation)	76–95	(Basketball Federation of Serbia) Crvena zvezda Meridianbet	Zadar
17:00	Scoring by quarter: 18-22, 13-25, 25-26, 20-22
	Pts: Božić 25; Rebs: Božić 8 Asts: Lakić, Božić 3 PIR: Božić 30	Boxscore	Pts: Nedović 29; Rebs: Petrušev 4 Asts: Campazzo 9 PIR: Nedović 29	Arena: Krešimir Ćosić Hall; Attendance: 6000; Referees: Matej Boltauzer, Damir Javor, Nermin Nikšić

5 March 2023 20	Cibona (Croatian Basketball Federation)	85–81	(Basketball Federation of Serbia) Crvena zvezda Meridianbet	Zagreb
15:30	Scoring by quarter: 22-24, 17-16, 22-27, 24-14
	Pts: Kapusta 24; Rebs: Aranitović 8 Asts: Kapusta 4 PIR: Kapusta 23	Boxscore	Pts: Petrušev 15; Rebs: Lazarević 7 Asts: Campazzo 6 PIR: Petrušev 19	Arena: Dražen Petrović Basketball Hall; Attendance: 1500; Referees: Saša Pukl, Sašo Petek, Marko Juras

13 March 2023 21 (Rivalry)	Partizan Mozzart Bet (Basketball Federation of Serbia)	92–81	(Basketball Federation of Serbia) Crvena zvezda Meridianbet	Belgrade
20:30	Scoring by quarter: 13-24, 21-24, 29-18, 29-15
	Pts: Lessort 27; Rebs: Lessort 8 Asts: Madar 5 PIR: Lessort 38	Boxscore	Pts: Campazzo 21; Rebs: Martin 6 Asts: Campazzo 5 PIR: Campazzo 27	Arena: Štark Arena; Attendance: 17124; Referees: Tomislav Hordov, Milan Nedović, Luka Kardum

19 March 2023 22	Crvena zvezda Meridianbet (Basketball Federation of Serbia)	90–70	(Basketball Federation of Montenegro) SC Derby	Belgrade
19:00	Scoring by quarter: 29-26, 17-11, 24-19, 20-14
	Pts: Campazzo 23; Rebs: Kuzmić 8 Asts: Campazzo 7 PIR: Campazzo 28	Boxscore	Pts: Tasić 16; Rebs: Ivišić 7 Asts: Pavličević 6 PIR: Ivišić 18	Arena: Aleksandar Nikolić Hall; Attendance: 1458; Referees: Denis Hadžić, Tomislav Stapić, Nermin Nikšić

20 April 2023 23	Mornar Barsko zlato (Basketball Federation of Montenegro)	65–87	(Basketball Federation of Serbia) Crvena zvezda Meridianbet	Bar
19:00	Scoring by quarter: 7-23, 18-24, 25-19, 15-21
	Pts: Glas 19; Rebs: Vranješ, Miković 5 Asts: Glas 7 PIR: Glas 19	Boxscore	Pts: Nedović 20; Rebs: Lazarević 4 Asts: Campazzo 8 PIR: Campazzo 18	Arena: Topolica Sport Hall; Attendance: 1985; Referees: Milivoje Jovčić, Tomislav Vovk, Radoš Savović

3 April 2023 24	Mega MIS (Basketball Federation of Serbia)	78–87	(Basketball Federation of Serbia) Crvena zvezda Meridianbet	Belgrade
18:00	Scoring by quarter: 19-25, 17-26, 17-21, 25-15
	Pts: Đurišić 16; Rebs: Rudan 8 Asts: three players 5 PIR: Rudan 18	Boxscore	Pts: Dobrić 23; Rebs: Petrušev 7 Asts: Campazzo 11; PIR: Campazzo 33	Arena: Ranko Žeravica Sports Hall; Attendance: 2500; Referees: Miloš Koljenšić, Josip Radojković, Gordan Terlević

9 April 2023 25	Borac Mozzart (Basketball Federation of Serbia)	82–87	(Basketball Federation of Serbia) Crvena zvezda Meridianbet	Čačak
19:00	Scoring by quarter: 17-19, 17-23, 16-22, 32-23
	Pts: Hale 28; Rebs: three players 5 Asts: Baldwin 4 PIR: Hale 28	Boxscore	Pts: Campazzo 22; Rebs: Petrušev 10; Asts: Nedović 5 PIR: Campazzo 27	Arena: Borac Hall; Attendance: 2500; Referees: Uroš Obrknežević, Marko Juras, Stefan Ćalić

17 April 2023 26	Crvena zvezda Meridianbet (Basketball Federation of Serbia)	83–74	(Croatian Basketball Federation) Split	Belgrade
20:00	Scoring by quarter: 23-21, 16-15, 24-25, 20-13
	Pts: Petrušev 25; Rebs: Ilić, Petrušev 6 Asts: Campazzo, Petrušev 4 PIR: Petrušev 36	Boxscore	Pts: Shorter 21; Rebs: Nelson 7 Asts: Shorter 6 PIR: Shorter 28	Arena: Aleksandar Nikolić Hall; Attendance: 4328; Referees: Milan Nedović, Radoš Arsenijević, Krunoslav Peić

==== Playoffs ====
28 April 2023 Quarterfinal 1	Crvena zvezda Meridianbet (Serbia)	100–73 (Series: 1−0)	(Croatia) Zadar	Belgrade
20:00	Scoring by quarter: 25–20, 33–16, 20–17, 22–20
	Pts: Nedović, Petrušev 16; Rebs: Bentil 5 Asts: Campazzo 8 PIR: Mitrović 18	Boxscore	Pts: Božić 18; Rebs: Lakić 6 Asts: Božić 5 PIR: Božić 26	Arena: Aleksandar Nikolić Hall; Attendance: 5,241; Referees: Milivoje Jovčić, Sašo Petek, Marko Mustapić

8 May 2023 Quarterfinal 2	Zadar (Croatia)	63–74 (Series: 2−0)	(Serbia) Crvena zvezda Meridianbet	Zadar
18:00	Scoring by quarter: 12-19, 21-16, 11-18, 19-21
	Pts: Božić 17; Rebs: Žganec 8 Asts: Božić 5 PIR: Božić 26	Boxscore	Pts: Mitrović 13; Rebs: Campazzo, Petrušev 6 Asts: Campazzo 4 PIR: Mitrović 19	Arena: Krešimir Ćosić Hall; Attendance: 4,000; Referees: Saša Pukl, Ilija Belošević, Mario Majkić

14 May 2023 Semifinal 1	Crvena zvezda Meridianbet (Serbia)	93–55 (Series: 1−0)	(Montenegro) Budućnost VOLI	Belgrade
19:30	Scoring by quarter: 30-16, 21-17, 22-10, 20-12
	Pts: Petrušev 17; Rebs: Mitrović 10; Asts: Campazzo 6 PIR: Mitrović 23	Boxscore	Pts: Green 13; Rebs: Ilić 7 Asts: Drobnjak 3 PIR: Green 10	Arena: Aleksandar Nikolić Hall; Attendance: 7,879; Referees: Saša Pukl, Damir Javor, Sašo Petek

23 May 2023 Semifinal 2	Budućnost VOLI (Montenegro)	56–97 (Series: 0–2)	(Serbia) Crvena zvezda Meridianbet	Podgorica
20:00	Scoring by quarter: 26–25, 8–23, 11–29, 11–20
	Pts: Drobnjak 11; Rebs: Green 9 Asts: Jagodić-Kuridža 2 PIR: Kaba 13	Boxscore	Pts: Mitrović 17; Rebs: Bentil 6 Asts: Dobrić 4 PIR: Mitrović 23	Arena: Morača Sports Center; Attendance: 4,200; Referees: Matej Boltauzer, Milan Nedović, Denis Hadžić

13 June 2023 Final 1	Partizan Mozzart Bet (Serbia)	88–80 (Series: 1–0)	(Serbia) Crvena zvezda Meridianbet	Belgrade
20:00	Scoring by quarter: 29–21, 27–15, 17–25, 15–19
Arena Sport	Pts: LeDay 24; Rebs: LeDay, Lessort 5 Asts: Madar 5 PIR: Punter 26	Boxscore	Pts: Dobrić 17; Rebs: Dobrić 6 Asts: Campazzo 10; PIR: Campazzo 20	Arena: Štark Arena; Attendance: 18,324; Referees: Saša Pukl, Josip Radojković, Milan Nedović

15 June 2023 Final 2	Partizan Mozzart Bet (Serbia)	87–78 (Series: 2–0)	(Serbia) Crvena zvezda Meridianbet	Belgrade
20:00	Scoring by quarter: 23–22, 21–22, 24–18, 19–16
Arena Sport	Pts: Nunnally, Smailagić 15; Rebs: LeDay 6 Asts: Madar 7 PIR: LeDay 18	Boxscore	Pts: Nedović 21; Rebs: Bentil 7 Asts: Campazzo 7 PIR: Nedović 15	Arena: Štark Arena; Attendance: 18,477; Referees: Matej Boltauzer, Miloš Koljenšić, Sašo Petek

18 June 2023 Final 3	Crvena zvezda Meridianbet (Serbia)	91–78 (Series: 2–1)	(Serbia) Partizan Mozzart Bet	Belgrade
20:30	Scoring by quarter: 19–21, 19–20, 24–18, 29–19
Arena Sport	Pts: Nedović 19; Rebs: Mitrović 7 Asts: Campazzo 6 PIR: Petrušev 23	Boxscore	Pts: Exum 16; Rebs: Lessort 9 Asts: Exum 3 PIR: Exum 13	Arena: Aleksandar Nikolić Hall; Attendance: 7,648; Referees: Damir Javor, Tomislav Hordov, Luka Kardum

20 June 2023 Final 4	Crvena zvezda Meridianbet (Serbia)	68–56 (Series: 2–2)	(Serbia) Partizan Mozzart Bet	Belgrade
19:00	Scoring by quarter: 20–13, 12–11, 17–15, 19–17
Arena Sport	Pts: Campazzo 21; Rebs: Dobrić 7 Asts: Campazzo 4 PIR: Campazzo, Dobrić 18	Boxscore	Pts: Exum 12; Rebs: Exum 10; Asts: Lessort 3 PIR: Lessort 20	Arena: Aleksandar Nikolić Hall; Attendance: 7,430; Referees: Saša Pukl, Matej Boltauzer, Josip Radojković

22 June 2023 Final 5	Partizan Mozzart Bet (Serbia)	96–85 (Series: 3–2)	(Serbia) Crvena zvezda Meridianbet	Belgrade
20:00	Scoring by quarter: 30–18, 24–16, 21–34, 21–17
Arena Sport	Pts: Punter 32; Rebs: Lessort 8 Asts: Exum 5 PIR: Punter 36	Boxscore	Pts: Dobrić 18; Rebs: Dobrić, Petrušev 5 Asts: Campazzo 8 PIR: Dobrić 22	Arena: Štark Arena; Attendance: 22,198; Referees: Saša Pukl, Damir Javor, Tomislav Hordov

=== EuroLeague ===
==== Regular season ====
Pos	Team	Pld	W	L	PF	PA	PD	Qualification
8	(Turkish Basketball Federation) Fenerbahçe Beko	34	19	15	2823	2745	+78	Qualification to playoffs
9	(Spanish Basketball Federation) Cazoo Baskonia	34	18	16	2919	2836	+83	
10	(Basketball Federation of Serbia) Crvena zvezda Meridianbet	34	17	17	2591	2613	−22	
11	(Turkish Basketball Federation) Anadolu Efes	34	17	17	2800	2736	+64	
12	(Italian Basketball Federation) EA7 Emporio Armani Milan	34	15	19	2534	2611	−77	

Source: EuroLeague
Rules for classification: All points scored in extra period(s) were not counted in the standings, nor for any tie-break situation.

==== Results summary ====
Overall						Home					Away				
Pld	W	L	PF	PA	PD	W	L	PF	PA	PD	W	L	PF	PA	PD
24	11	13	1792	1850	−58	6	5	833	812	+21	5	8	959	1038	−79

Last updated: 9 February 2023.
Source: Competitive matches

==== Results by round ====
Round	1	2	3	4	5	6	7	8	9	10	11	12	13	14	15	16	17	18	19	20	21	22	23	24	25	26	27	28	29	30	31	32	33	34
Ground	A	H	A	A	H	A	A	H	A	H	H	A	H	H	A	H	A	H	H	A	H	A	A	A	H	A	H	A	A	H	H	A	H	H
Result	L	L	L	L	W	L	L	W	W	W	W	W	W	L	W	L	W	L	W	L	L	L	L	W	L	L	W	L	L	W	W	W	W	W
Position	16	16	18	18	16	18	18	17	17	14	12	11	9	10	10	10	10	10	10	10	12	13	13	13	13	13	13	14	14	14	12	11	10	10

Last updated: 29 March 2022.
Source: Competitive matches
Ground: A = Away; H = Home; R = Rest. Result: L = Loss; W = Win; R = Rest; P = Postponed.

Win Loss

==== Matches ====
Note: All times are CET (UTC+1) as listed by EuroLeague. The club changed its sponsoring name on 1 January 2023.

7 October 2022 1	Anadolu Efes (Turkish Basketball Federation)	72–59	(Basketball Federation of Serbia) Crvena zvezda mts	Istanbul
19:30	Scoring by quarter: 17–14, 18–20, 21–16, 16–9
	Pts: Clyburn 19; Rebs: Žižić 5 Asts: Micić 6 PIR: Clyburn 19	Boxscore	Pts: Bentil 13; Rebs: Lazić, Petrušev 6 Asts: Mitrović, Ivanović 5 PIR: Bentil 15	Arena: Sinan Erdem Dome; Attendance: 14,721; Referees: Benjamín Jiménez, Tomasz Trawicki, Arturas Šukys

13 October 2022 2	Crvena zvezda mts (Basketball Federation of Serbia)	75–77	(Hellenic Basketball Federation) Panathinaikos	Belgrade
19:00	Scoring by quarter: 24–18, 14–24, 18–15, 19–20
	Pts: Bentil 18; Rebs: Mitrović, Bentil 6 Asts: three players 3 PIR: Bentil 17	Boxscore	Pts: Grigonis 17; Rebs: Papagiannis 7 Asts: Grigonis, Ponitka 3 PIR: Grigonis 21	Arena: Aleksandar Nikolić Hall; Attendance: 7,293; Referees: Miguel Ángel Pérez, Michele Rossi, Jurgis Laurinavičius

19 October 2022 3	Cazoo Baskonia (Spanish Basketball Federation)	92–75	(Basketball Federation of Serbia) Crvena zvezda mts	Vitoria-Gasteiz
20:30	Scoring by quarter: 23–24, 19–23, 17–10, 33–18
	Pts: Howard 30; Rebs: Giedraitis 6 Asts: Thompson 4 PIR: Howard 32	Boxscore	Pts: Mitrović 17; Rebs: Mitrović 8 Asts: Adams, Marković 5 PIR: Mitrović 27	Arena: Buesa Arena; Attendance: 6,081; Referees: Oļegs Latiševs, Mehdi Difallah, Rain Peerandi

21 October 2022 4	Real Madrid (Spanish Basketball Federation)	72–56	(Basketball Federation of Serbia) Crvena zvezda mts	Madrid
20:45 (CEST)	Scoring by quarter: 25–10, 14–20, 15–14, 18–12
	Pts: Musa 13; Rebs: Deck 9 Asts: Rodríguez 8 PIR: Deck 23	Boxscore	Pts: Bentil 17; Rebs: Bentil, Petrušev 5 Asts: Vildoza 4 PIR: Bentil 19	Arena: WiZink Center; Attendance: 7,561; Referees: Saša Pukl, Anne Panther, Robert Vyklický

28 October 2022 5	Crvena zvezda mts (Basketball Federation of Serbia)	78–72	(German Basketball Federation) Bayern Munich	Belgrade
19:00 (CEST)	Scoring by quarter: 28–17, 16–26, 21–14, 13–15
	Pts: Vildoza 20; Rebs: Bentil 13; Asts: Vildoza 6 PIR: Bentil 22	Boxscore	Pts: Winston 18; Rebs: Weiler-Babb 10; Asts: three players 2 PIR: Winston 20	Arena: Aleksandar Nikolić Hall; Attendance: 7,343; Referees: Sreten Radović, Gytis Vilius, Aare Halliko

4 November 2022 6	AS Monaco (French Federation of Basketball)	85–77	(Basketball Federation of Serbia) Crvena zvezda mts	Fontvieille
21:00 (CET)	Scoring by quarter: 17–19, 21–12, 21–22, 26–24
	Pts: James 21; Rebs: Hall 7 Asts: Okobo, Loyd 3 PIR: Loyd 22	Boxscore	Pts: Petrušev 16; Rebs: Petrušev 12; Asts: Petrušev, Vildoza 4 PIR: Petrušev 27	Arena: Salle Gaston Médecin; Attendance: 4,521; Referees: Carlos Peruga, Michele Rossi, Jakub Zamojski

10 November 2022 7	Fenerbahçe Beko (Turkish Basketball Federation)	93–79	(Basketball Federation of Serbia) Crvena zvezda mts	Istanbul
18:00 (CET)	Scoring by quarter: 24–23, 18–18, 24–16, 27–22
	Pts: Motley 25; Rebs: Motley 10; Asts: Calathes 6 PIR: Motley 33	Boxscore	Pts: Nedović 17; Rebs: Kuzmić 6 Asts: Nedović 4 PIR: Nedović 20	Arena: Ülker Sports and Event Hall; Attendance: 9,384; Referees: Miguel Ángel Pérez, Leandro Lezcano, Hugues Thépénier

17 November 2022 8	Crvena zvezda mts (Basketball Federation of Serbia)	71–67	(French Federation of Basketball) LDLC ASVEL	Belgrade
19:00 (CET)	Scoring by quarter: 17–14, 21–9, 16–30, 17–14
	Pts: Ivanović 16; Rebs: Mitrović 8 Asts: Bentil, Ivanović 3 PIR: Ivanović 22	Boxscore	Pts: Lighty 16; Rebs: three players 5 Asts: Diot 4 PIR: Kahudi 15	Arena: Aleksandar Nikolić Hall; Attendance: 6,987; Referees: Juan Carlos García, Marcin Kowalski, Vasiliki Tsaroucha

22 November 2022 9	ALBA Berlin (German Basketball Federation)	84–88(OT)	(Basketball Federation of Serbia) Crvena zvezda mts	Berlin
20:00 (CET)	Scoring by quarter: 19–20, 21–17, 17–18, 18–20, Overtime: 9–13
	Pts: Smith 23; Rebs: Smith 8 Asts: Sikma, Blatt 7 PIR: Smith 22	Boxscore	Pts: Vildoza 21; Rebs: Petrušev 8 Asts: Nedović 6 PIR: Vildoza 22	Arena: Mercedes-Benz Arena; Attendance: 7,117; Referees: Sreten Radović, Emilio Pérez, Tomasz Trawicki

24 November 2022 10	Crvena zvezda mts (Basketball Federation of Serbia)	69–68	(Israeli Basketball Association) Maccabi Playtika Tel Aviv	Belgrade
17:30 (CET)	Scoring by quarter: 27–18, 9–11, 14–18, 19–21
	Pts: Nedović 12; Rebs: Martin 6 Asts: Ivanović, Vildoza 3 PIR: Martin 13	Boxscore	Pts: Brown 23; Rebs: Brown, Sorkin 6 Asts: Brown 7 PIR: Brown 30	Arena: Aleksandar Nikolić Hall; Attendance: 6,453; Referees: Oļegs Latiševs, Mehdi Difallah, Saulius Račys

2 December 2022 11	Crvena zvezda mts (Basketball Federation of Serbia)	83–74	(Italian Basketball Federation) Virtus Segafredo Bologna	Belgrade
18:00 (CET)	Scoring by quarter: 17–23, 25–18, 25–14, 16–19
	Pts: Dobrić 20; Rebs: Marković 8 Asts: Vildoza, Marković 5 PIR: Mitrović 21	Boxscore	Pts: Jaiteh 15; Rebs: Jaiteh 9 Asts: Cordinier, Mickey 3 PIR: Jaiteh 27	Arena: Aleksandar Nikolić Hall; Attendance: 7,146; Referees: Miguel Ángel Pérez, Emin Moğulkoç, Leandro Lezcano

8 December 2022 12 (Rivalry)	Partizan Mozzart Bet (Basketball Federation of Serbia)	73–76	(Basketball Federation of Serbia) Crvena zvezda mts	Belgrade
20:30 (CET)	Scoring by quarter: 20–11, 13–29, 19–14, 21–22
	Pts: Punter 15; Rebs: Lessort 10; Asts: three players 3 PIR: Lessort 24	Boxscore	Pts: Nedović 20; Rebs: Martin 7 Asts: Vildoza 6 PIR: Vildoza 21	Arena: Štark Arena; Attendance: 18,340; Referees: Juan Carlos García, Robert Lottermoser, Gytis Vilius

13 December 2022 13	Crvena zvezda mts (Basketball Federation of Serbia)	77–73	(Lithuanian Basketball Federation) Žalgiris	Belgrade
19:00 (CET)	Scoring by quarter: 14–22, 22–15, 20–21, 21–15
	Pts: Vildoza 27; Rebs: four players 4 Asts: Nedović 4 PIR: Vildoza 24	Boxscore	Pts: Evans 18; Rebs: Evans 8 Asts: three players 3 PIR: Ulanovas 20	Arena: Aleksandar Nikolić Hall; Attendance: 7,488; Referees: Carmelo Paternicò, Joseph Bissang, Jordi Aliaga

15 December 2022 14	Crvena zvezda mts (Basketball Federation of Serbia)	67–71	(Italian Basketball Federation) EA7 Emporio Armani Milan	Belgrade
19:00 (CET)	Scoring by quarter: 16–26, 13–17, 20–14, 18–14
	Pts: Petrušev 20; Rebs: Petrušev 11; Asts: Vildoza 6 PIR: Petrušev 28	Boxscore	Pts: Baron 19; Rebs: Davies, Melli 6 Asts: Davies 7 PIR: Davies 30	Arena: Aleksandar Nikolić Hall; Attendance: 7,469; Referees: Daniel Hierrenzuelo, Saulius Račys, Sergio Silva

22 December 2022 15	Olympiacos (Hellenic Basketball Federation)	86–90	(Basketball Federation of Serbia) Crvena zvezda mts	Piraeus
20:00 (CET)	Scoring by quarter: 22–21, 23–20, 17–24, 24–25
	Pts: Black, Sloukas 14; Rebs: Black, Vezenkov 6 Asts: Sloukas 9 PIR: Sloukas 24	Boxscore	Pts: Vildoza 22; Rebs: Mitrović 7 Asts: Vildoza 8 PIR: Vildoza 29	Arena: Peace and Friendship Stadium; Attendance: 9,787; Referees: Miguel Ángel Pérez, Michele Rossi, Marcin Kowalski

30 December 2022 16	Crvena zvezda mts (Basketball Federation of Serbia)	94–99(OT)	(Spanish Basketball Federation) Barcelona	Belgrade
19:00 (CET)	Scoring by quarter: 17–28, 23–15, 25–14, 19–27, Overtime: 10–15
	Pts: Nedović, Petrušev 24; Rebs: Petrušev 9 Asts: Nedović 7 PIR: Nedović 30	Boxscore	Pts: Satoranský 19; Rebs: Veselý 5 Asts: Satoranský 10; PIR: Satoranský 28	Arena: Aleksandar Nikolić Hall; Attendance: 7,500; Referees: Robert Lottermoser, Emin Mogulkoc, Aare Halliko

6 January 2023 17	Valencia Basket (Spanish Basketball Federation)	75–77	(Basketball Federation of Serbia) Crvena zvezda Meridianbet	Valencia
20:30 (CET)	Scoring by quarter: 19–24, 23–23, 16–14, 17–16
	Pts: Jones 16; Rebs: López-Arostegui 6 Asts: Jones 5 PIR: Jones 19	Boxscore	Pts: Petrušev 25; Rebs: Petrušev 9 Asts: Nedović 6 PIR: Petrušev 36	Arena: La Fonteta; Attendance: 5,666; Referees: Gytis Vilius, Piotr Pastusiak, Kristaps Konstantinovs

10 January 2023 18	Crvena zvezda Meridianbet (Basketball Federation of Serbia)	59–79	(Spanish Basketball Federation) Real Madrid	Belgrade
19:00 (CET)	Scoring by quarter: 16–25, 18–13, 17–19, 8–22
	Pts: Nedović 18; Rebs: Marković 6 Asts: Marković 7 PIR: Dobrić 16	Boxscore	Pts: Musa 19; Rebs: Tavares 12; Asts: Rodríguez 7 PIR: Tavares 35	Arena: Aleksandar Nikolić Hall; Attendance: 7,289; Referees: Oļegs Latiševs, Carmelo Paternicò, Tomasz Trawicki

12 January 2023 19	Crvena zvezda Meridianbet (Basketball Federation of Serbia)	92–68	(French Federation of Basketball) AS Monaco	Belgrade
19:00 (CET)	Scoring by quarter: 23–15, 31–21, 18–14, 20–18
	Pts: Petrušev 21; Rebs: Mitrović, Petrušev 6 Asts: Marković 8 PIR: Petrušev 25	Boxscore	Pts: James 26; Rebs: James, Brown 6 Asts: Diallo, Makoundou 3 PIR: James 32	Arena: Aleksandar Nikolić Hall; Attendance: 7,301; Referees: Juan Carlos García, Sérgio Silva, Seffi Shemmesh

20 January 2023 20	Žalgiris (Lithuanian Basketball Federation)	71–66	(Basketball Federation of Serbia) Crvena zvezda Meridianbet	Kaunas
19:00 (CET)	Scoring by quarter: 20–14, 18–16, 12–26, 21–10
	Pts: Ulanovas 13; Rebs: Butkevičius 7 Asts: Ulanovas 6 PIR: Ulanovas 17	Boxscore	Pts: Petrušev 16; Rebs: Kuzmić, Lazarević 6 Asts: Vildoza 4 PIR: Petrušev 17	Arena: Žalgirio Arena; Attendance: 15,272; Referees: Miguel Ángel Pérez, Marcin Kowalski, Rain Peerandi

27 January 2023 21 (Rivalry)	Crvena zvezda Meridianbet (Basketball Federation of Serbia)	78–79	(Basketball Federation of Serbia) Partizan Mozzart Bet	Belgrade
19:00 (CET)	Scoring by quarter: 18–20, 19–25, 17–12, 24–22
	Pts: Vildoza 26; Rebs: Petrušev 10; Asts: Mitrović 5 PIR: Vildoza 29	Boxscore	Pts: Exum, LeDay 20; Rebs: Lessort 8 Asts: Exum 5 PIR: Exum, LeDay 22	Arena: Aleksandar Nikolić Hall; Attendance: 8,300; Referees: Borys Ryzhyk, Fernando Rocha, Oļegs Latiševs

31 January 2023 22	Virtus Segafredo Bologna (Italian Basketball Federation)	84–72	(Basketball Federation of Serbia) Crvena zvezda Meridianbet	Bologna
21:00 (CET)	Scoring by quarter: 30–14, 18–21, 22–16, 14–21
	Pts: Shengelia 15; Rebs: Jaiteh, Mickey 8 Asts: Teodosić 9 PIR: Shengelia 19	Boxscore	Pts: Vildoza 20; Rebs: Ilić 7 Asts: Vildoza, Bentil 3 PIR: Vildoza 20	Arena: Segafredo Arena; Attendance: 7,756; Referees: Daniel Hierrezuelo, Emin Moğulkoç, Eduard Udyanskyy

2 February 2023 23	EA7 Emporio Armani Milan (Italian Basketball Federation)	74–68	(Basketball Federation of Serbia) Crvena zvezda Meridianbet	Assago
20:30 (CET)	Scoring by quarter: 22-18, 23-14, 14-17, 15-19
	Pts: Baron 15; Rebs: Cabarrot 6 Asts: Napier 5 PIR: Baron 18	Boxscore	Pts: Bentil 17; Rebs: Bentil 7 Asts: Marković 5 PIR: Bentil 19	Arena: Mediolanum Forum; Attendance: 9,165; Referees: Juan Carlos Garcia, Mehdi Difallah, Amit Balak

9 February 2023 24	Maccabi Playtika Tel Aviv (Israeli Basketball Association)	86–89	(Basketball Federation of Serbia) Crvena zvezda Meridianbet	Tel Aviv
20:05 (CET)	Scoring by quarter: 18-18, 16-26, 21-25, 31-20
	Pts: Baldwin IV 38; Rebs: Baldwin IV 5 Asts: Baldwin IV 5 PIR: Baldwin IV 39	Boxscore	Pts: Nedović 28; Rebs: Mitrović 6 Asts: Ivanović 7 PIR: Nedović 24	Arena: Menora Mivtachim Arena; Attendance: 10,416; Referees: Miguel Angel Perez, Arturas Sukys, Sebastien Clivaz

24 February 2023 25	Crvena zvezda Meridianbet (Basketball Federation of Serbia)	72–87	(German Basketball Federation) ALBA Berlin	Belgrade
19:00 (CET)	Scoring by quarter: 25-15, 19-24, 17-21, 11-27
	Pts: Petrušev 14; Rebs: Lazarević 4 Asts: Nedović 5 PIR: Mitrović 10	Boxscore	Pts: Lo 24; Rebs: Olinde 7 Asts: Sikma 6 PIR: Lo 27	Arena: Aleksandar Nikolić Hall; Attendance: 6752; Referees: Fernando Rocha, Ioannis Foufis, Jurgis Laurinavicius

2 March 2023 26	Bayern Munich (German Basketball Federation)	87–80	(Basketball Federation of Serbia) Crvena zvezda Meridianbet	Munich
20:45 (CET)	Scoring by quarter: 19-23, 22-15, 11-18, 35-24
	Pts: Lučić 20; Rebs: Gillespie 9 Asts: Obst 3 PIR: Lučić 16	Boxscore	Pts: Vildoza 18; Rebs: Lazarević 7 Asts: Campazzo 7 PIR: Nedović 21	Arena: Audi Dome; Attendance: 6388; Referees: Olegs Latisevs, Carlos Peruga, Tomasz Trawicki

8 March 2023 27	Crvena zvezda Meridianbet (Basketball Federation of Serbia)	94–75	(Turkish Basketball Federation) Anadolu Efes	Belgrade
19:00 (CET)	Scoring by quarter: 20-25, 29-20, 19-22, 26-8
	Pts: Campazzo 22; Rebs: Lazarević 4 Asts: Campazzo 7 PIR: Campazzo 30	Boxscore	Pts: Žižić 16; Rebs: Clyburn 9 Asts: Tuncer 6 PIR: Clyburn 21	Arena: Aleksandar Nikolić Hall; Attendance: 6064; Referees: Robert Lottermoser, Juan Carlos Garcia, Piotr Pastusiak

10 March 2023 28	Panathinaikos (Hellenic Basketball Federation)	75–66	(Basketball Federation of Serbia) Crvena Zvezda Meridianbet	Athens
20:00 (CET)	Scoring by quarter: 9-17, 20-25, 23-13, 23-11
	Pts: Papagiannis 17; Rebs: Papagiannis 7 Asts: Lee 5 PIR: Papagiannis 22	Boxscore	Pts: Nedović 12; Rebs: Petrušev 9 Asts: Campazzo 4 PIR: Nedović 13	Arena: O.A.C.A. Olympic Indoor Hall; Attendance: 3853; Referees: Miguel Angel Perez, Emin Mogulkoc, Joseph Bissang

17 March 2023 29	Barcelona (Spanish Basketball Federation)	85–79	(Basketball Federation of Serbia) Crvena Zvezda Meridianbet	Barcelona
20:30 (CET)	Scoring by quarter: 18-15, 22-21, 17-21, 28-22
	Pts: Mirotić 21; Rebs: Vesely 6 Asts: Jokubaitis 8 PIR: Mirotić 24	Boxscore	Pts: Campazzo 24; Rebs: Bentil 7 Asts: Campazzo 4 PIR: Campazzo 24	Arena: Palau Blaugrana; Attendance: 7160; Referees: Sreten Radovic, Carmelo Paternico, Amit Balak

23 March 2023 30	Crvena Zvezda Meridianbet (Basketball Federation of Serbia)	74–63	(Spanish Basketball Federation) Cazoo Baskonia	Belgrade
19:00 (CET)	Scoring by quarter: 21-26, 18-12, 18-11, 17-14
	Pts: Nedović 20; Rebs: Petrušev 9 Asts: Campazzo 7 PIR: Nedović 16	Boxscore	Pts: Thompson 15; Rebs: Costello 6 Asts: Costello 6 PIR: Thompson 19	Arena: Aleksandar Nikolić Hall; Attendance: 5893; Referees: Mehdi Difallah, Fernando Rocha, Anne Panther

29 March 2023 31	Crvena Zvezda Meridianbet (Basketball Federation of Serbia)	92–73	(Spanish Basketball Federation) Valencia Basket	Belgrade
19:00 (CET)	Scoring by quarter: 20-21, 26-20, 23-21, 23-11
	Pts: Petrušev 20; Rebs: Petrušev 7 Asts: Campazzo 7 PIR: Petrušev 26	Boxscore	Pts: Radebaugh 14; Rebs: Dubljević 6 Asts: Jones 5 PIR: Jones 16	Arena: Aleksandar Nikolić Hall; Attendance: 6538; Referees: Mehdi Difallah, Piotr Pastusiak, Seffi Shemmesh

31 March 2023 32	LDLC ASVEL (French Federation of Basketball)	60–76	(Basketball Federation of Serbia) Crvena Zvezda Meridianbet	Villeurbanne
21:00 (CET)	Scoring by quarter: 19-17, 23-20, 11-19, 7-20
	Pts: De Colo 14; Rebs: Tyus 9 Asts: Bost, De Colo 3 PIR: De Colo 20	Boxscore	Pts: Dobrić 20; Rebs: Petrušev 7 Asts: Vildoza 8 PIR: Campazzo 20	Arena: Astroballe; Attendance: 5368; Referees: Juan carlos Garcia, Robert Lottermoser, Eduard Udyanskyy

6 April 2023 33	Crvena Zvezda Meridianbet (Basketball Federation of Serbia)	87–79	(Hellenic Basketball Federation) Olympiacos	Belgrade
19:00 (CET)	Scoring by quarter: 26-30, 19-17, 20-12, 22-20
	Pts: Campazzo 20; Rebs: Martin 5 Asts: Campazzo 8 PIR: Campazzo 33	Boxscore	Pts: Vezenkov 16; Rebs: Vezenkov 8 Asts: Walkup 5 PIR: Vezenkov 23	Arena: Aleksandar Nikolić Hall; Attendance: 7368; Referees: Miguel Angel Perez, Joseph Bissang, Robert Vyklicky

13 April 2023 34	Crvena Zvezda Meridianbet (Basketball Federation of Serbia)	91–89(OT)	(Turkish Basketball Federation) Fenerbahçe Beko	Belgrade
19:00 (CET)	Scoring by quarter: 15-21, 26-18, 16-18, 22-22, Overtime: 12-10
	Pts: Campazzo 24; Rebs: Petrušev 6 Asts: Mitrović 4 PIR: Vildoza 21	Boxscore	Pts: Motley 27; Rebs: Hayes-Davis 8 Asts: Calathes 12; PIR: Hayes-Davis 25	Arena: Aleksandar Nikolić Hall; Attendance: 7259; Referees: Robert Lottermoser, Carmelo Paternico, Jordi Aliaga

=== Serbian League ===
The 2022–23 Basketball League of Serbia will be the 17th season of the Serbian highest professional basketball league. Crvena Zvezda is the 7-time defending champion.

Win Loss

9 June 2023 Finals 1	Crvena zvezda mts	94–70 (Series: 1-0)	FMP Meridian	Belgrade
18:00	Scoring by quarter: 29-16, 24-12, 20-21, 21-21
	Pts: Mitrović 21; Rebs: Mitrović 6 Asts: Campazzo, Marković 5 PIR: Mitrović 23	Boxscore	Pts: Izundu 11; Rebs: Beech 5 Asts: Moore 4 PIR: Izundu 13	Arena: Aleksandar Nikolić Hall; Attendance: 3457

11 June 2023 Finals 2	FMP Meridian	72–82 (Series: 0–2)	Crvena zvezda mts	Belgrade
12:00	Scoring by quarter: 27-23, 9-20, 19-18, 17-21
	Pts: Stepanović 19; Rebs: Simović 5 Asts: Jenkins 7 PIR: Stepanović 22	Boxscore	Pts: Mitrović 16; Rebs: Mitrović 6 Asts: Campazzo 7 PIR: Mitrović 18	Arena: Železnik Hall; Attendance: 1350

=== Radivoj Korać Cup ===
The 2023 Radivoj Korać Cup is the 21st season of the Serbian men's national basketball cup tournament. Crvena Zvezda successfully defended their title beating Mega in the finals, winning their 9th title and 3rd one in a row, surpassing Partizan.

Win Loss

16 February 2023 Quarterfinals	Crvena zvezda Meridianbet	89–64	Borac Mozzart	Niš
18:00	Scoring by quarter: 17-19, 18-12, 29-17, 25-16
	Pts: Vildoza 18; Rebs: Mitrović 7 Asts: Campazzo 6 PIR: Mitrović 26	Boxscore	Pts: Gagić, Radonjić 14; Rebs: Gagić 9 Asts: Gagić 5 PIR: Baldwin, Gagić 15	Arena: Čair Sports Center; Attendance: 2,500; Referees: Nemanja Ninković, Vladimir Vesković, Miloš Hadžić

17 February 2023 Semifinals	Crvena zvezda Meridianbet	83–75	Partizan Mozzart Bet	Niš
21:00	Scoring by quarter: 15-21, 19-23, 25-14, 24-17
	Pts: Vildoza 15; Rebs: Mitrović, Bentil 7 Asts: Campazzo 7 PIR: Campazzo, Lazić 22		Pts: Nunnally 19; Rebs: Lessort 12; Asts: Avramović 4 PIR: Nunnally 7	Arena: Čair Sports Center; Attendance: 5200; Referees: Nikolic, Obrknezevic, Calic

18 February 2023 Final	Crvena zvezda Meridianbet	96–79	Mega MIS	Niš
21:00	Scoring by quarter: 22–23, 29–21, 27–21, 18–14
	Pts: Dobrić 24; Rebs: Petrušev 8 Asts: Vildoza 7 PIR: Dobrić 31		Pts: Cazalon 15; Rebs: Uskoković 5 Asts: Rorie 5 PIR: Uskoković 221	Arena: Čair Sports Center; Attendance: 2500; Referees: Jevtovic, Prpa, Calic

== Individual awards ==
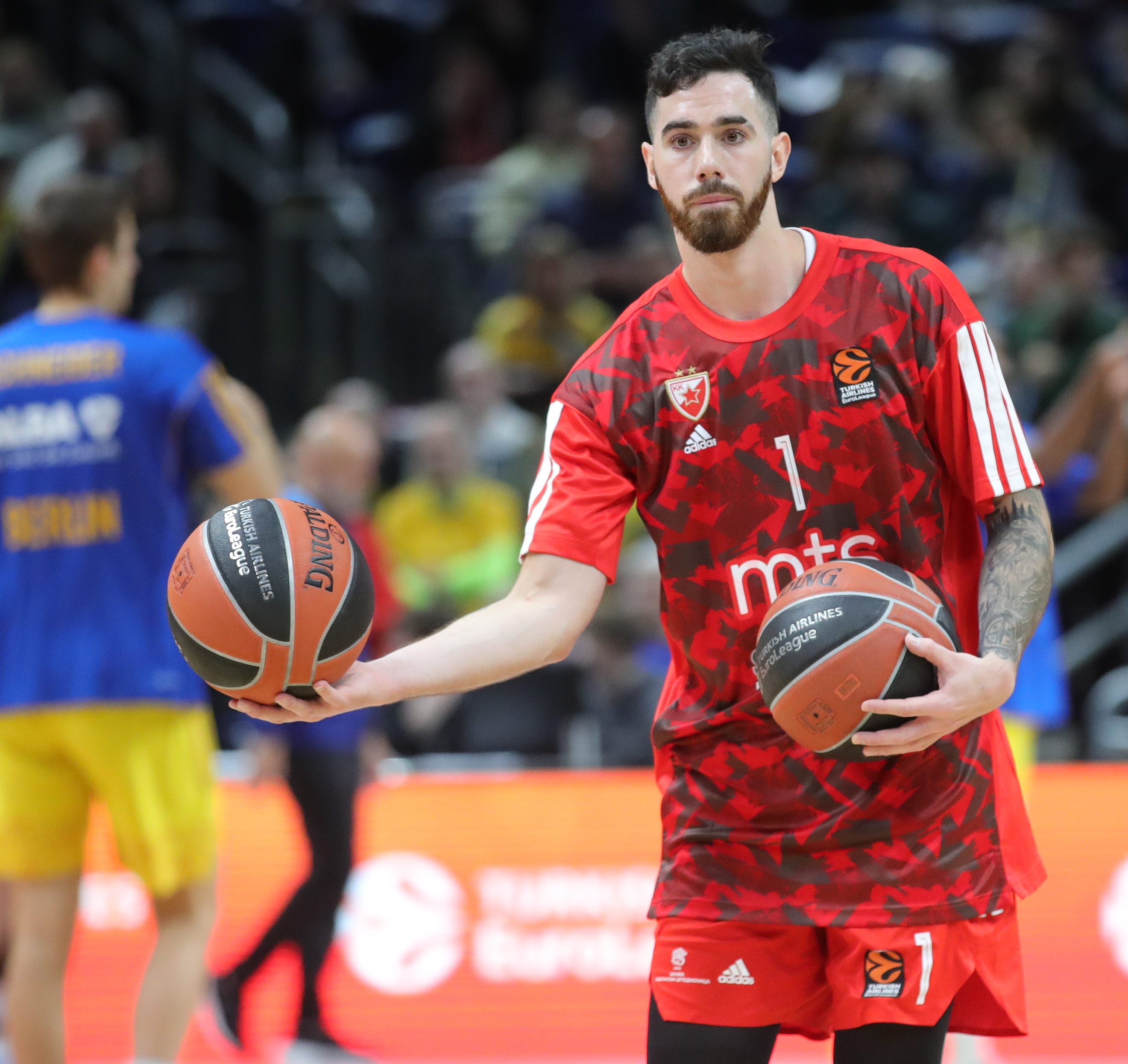
Guard Luca Vildoza is the first Zvezda's player who won the ABA League Player of the Month Award since November 2017, as well as the EuroLeague MVP of the Month since January 2017.

=== EuroLeague ===
MVP of the Round
Round	Player	PIR	Ref.
17	(Serbia) Filip Petrušev	36	

MVP of the Month
Month	Player	Ref.
December 2022	(Argentina) Luca Vildoza	

=== ABA League ===
MVP of the Round
Round	Player	PIR
4	(Montenegro) Nikola Ivanović	30
7	(Serbia) Nemanja Nedović	30
26	(Serbia) Filip Petrušev	36
SF1	(Serbia) Luka Mitrović	23
F3	(Serbia) Filip Petrušev	23
F4	(Serbia) Ognjen Dobrić	18

MVP of the Month
Month	Player	Ref.
October 2022	(Argentina) Luca Vildoza	
January 2023	(Argentina) Facundo Campazzo	
February 2023	(Serbia) Nemanja Nedović	

Ideal Starting Five
Position	Player	Ref.
PG	(Argentina) Facundo Campazzo	

== Statistics ==
Legend
GP	Games played	GS	Games started	MPG	Minutes per game
FG%	Field-goal percentage	3FG%	3-point field-goal percentage	FT%	Free-throw percentage
RPG	Rebounds per game	APG	Assists per game	SPG	Steals per game
BPG	Blocks per game	PPG	Points per game	PIR	PIR per game

Player	Left during season

=== Adriatic League ===
Player	GP	GS	MPG	2FG%	3FG%	FT%	RPG	APG	SPG	BPG	PPG	PIR
Ben Bentil	18	12	16:00	.595	.388	.929	3.1	1.4	0.7	0.2	9.5	10.1
Facundo Campazzo	8	5	23:00	.531	.381	.862	3.1	6.9	2.3	0.0	13.4	20.3
Ognjen Dobrić	16	12	23:00	.591	.437	.750	2.6	1.6	0.5	0.1	10.2	10.2
John Holland	10	3	14:00	.429	.400	.500	1.1	0.9	0.4	0.0	4.9	2.6
Dalibor Ilić	10	2	18:00	.806	.429	.462	4.5	0.9	1.0	0.2	7.1	10.8
Nikola Ivanović	11	1	13:00	.267	.381	.966	1.6	2.8	0.6	0.0	5.5	9.8
Ognjen Kuzmić	7	5	8:00	.923	.000	.833	2.4	0.6	0.3	0.0	4.1	6.9
Stefan Lazarević	17	4	18:00	.622	.276	.643	2.4	0.8	0.5	0.1	4.6	3.6
Branko Lazić	17	13	17:00	.391	.372	.875	1.3	0.9	1.1	0.1	4.7	3.5
Stefan Marković	13	3	14:00	.600	.348	.667	2.8	3.0	0.8	0.2	2.6	5.9
Hassan Martin	10	4	13:00	.545	.000	.778	3.3	1.0	0.8	0.6	5.0	7.6
Luka Mitrović	16	6	18:00	.684	.000	.673	3.8	1.4	0.9	0.4	8.8	12.2
Nemanja Nedović	14	2	18:00	.564	.389	.887	1.1	2.1	0.6	0.0	12.5	13.1
Filip Petrušev	16	6	20:00	.627	.519	.806	5.3	1.8	0.3	0.8	10.3	13.6
Miroslav Raduljica	5	1	6:00	.273	.000	.846	0.8	0.2	0.6	0.2	3.4	2.2
Luca Vildoza	14	10	19:00	.679	.431	.871	1.5	4.7	1.6	0.1	10.6	13.9
Jaylen Adams	2	1	17:00	.600	.429	.750	1.5	2.5	0.5	0.0	9.0	7.5
Nikola Topić	7	0	8:00	.750	.250	1.000	1.0	0.7	0.3	0.0	3.4	3.1

Last updated: 12 February 2023.
Source: Adriatic League

=== Euroleague ===
Player	GP	GS	MPG	2FG%	3FG%	FT%	RPG	APG	SPG	BPG	PPG	PIR
Ben Bentil	22	18	21:34	.464	.361	.711	4.1	1.1	0.8	0.3	8.5	8.0
Facundo Campazzo	0	0	0:00	.000	.000	.000	0.0	0.0	0.0	0.0	0.0	0.0
Ognjen Dobrić	22	14	23:27	.566	.297	.800	2.8	1.8	0.5	0.0	9.0	8.3
John Holland	18	5	8:57	.350	.323	.833	0.7	0.4	0.3	0.0	3.0	1.9
Dalibor Ilić	5	0	10:39	.667	.000	.750	3.2	0.2	0.4	0.0	4.2	6.6
Nikola Ivanović	14	1	17:22	.464	.263	.875	1.9	2.4	1.2	0.0	5.0	7.0
Ognjen Kuzmić	15	10	8:44	.750	.000	.500	2.5	0.5	0.2	0.1	2.7	4.5
Stefan Lazarević	20	9	18:34	.571	.357	.786	2.4	0.5	0.2	0.0	3.3	2.8
Branko Lazić	24	15	18:45	.412	.531	.600	1.2	0.6	0.6	0.0	2.8	1.6
Stefan Marković	20	8	16:18	.467	.242	.667	2.0	2.6	0.4	0.1	2.1	3.2
Hassan Martin	13	0	16:06	.583	.000	.684	3.5	0.3	0.3	0.5	5.5	5.8
Luka Mitrović	21	9	18:29	.614	1.000	.725	4.8	1.7	0.1	0.1	7.4	9.9
Nemanja Nedović	20	4	22:55	.523	.266	.892	1.4	3.2	0.6	0.0	14.6	12.2
Filip Petrušev	24	9	21:43	.647	.333	.718	5.0	0.8	0.4	0.8	10.8	13.1
Miroslav Raduljica	3	1	4:30	.000	.000	.580	0.0	0.0	0.3	0.0	1.0	–2.3
Luca Vildoza	19	15	24:28	.489	.396	.898	2.3	3.8	1.7	0.1	14.1	13.8
Jaylen Adams	3	2	19:27	.270	.233	1.000	2.0	2.7	0.7	0.3	5.7	2.0
Nikola Topić	2	0	4:03	.000	.000	.000	1.0	0.5	0.0	0.0	0.0	0.0

Last updated: 9 February 2023.
Source: Euroleague

=== Radivoj Korać Cup ===
Player	GP	GS	MPG	2FG%	3FG%	FT%	RPG	APG	SPG	BPG	PPG	PIR
Ben Bentil	Not in the roster											
Facundo Campazzo	1	0	22:22	.333	.290	.667	1.0	6.0	2.0	0.0	10.0	12.0
Ognjen Dobrić	1	1	19:28	.667	.667	.000	4.0	1.0	0.0	0.0	10.0	11.0
John Holland	Not in the roster											
Dalibor Ilić	1	0	15:49	.333	.000	.500	4.0	0.0	0.0	1.0	4.0	5.0
Nikola Ivanović	Not in the roster											
Ognjen Kuzmić	1	1	6:04	.500	.000	.000	4.0	0.0	0.0	0.0	2.0	6.0
Stefan Lazarević	1	1	9:20	.000	.000	.000	2.0	1.0	0.0	0.0	0.0	0.0
Branko Lazić	1	0	16:49	.500	.333	.000	0.0	3.0	0.0	0.0	5.0	5.0
Stefan Marković	1	0	18:34	.000	1.000	.000	2.0	4.0	0.0	0.0	6.0	9.0
Hassan Martin	1	0	15:28	.600	.000	.000	2.0	1.0	0.0	1.0	6.0	3.0
Luka Mitrović	1	0	15:18	.500	.000	.000	7.0	2.0	0.0	0.0	4.0	9.0
Nemanja Nedović	1	0	18:07	1.000	.430	.000	3.0	2.0	1.0	0.0	13.0	19.0
Filip Petrušev	1	1	22:38	.560	.000	.250	4.0	1.0	0.0	0.0	11.0	12.0
Miroslav Raduljica	Not in the roster											
Luca Vildoza	1	1	20:03	1.000	.667	1.000	2.0	4.0	2.0	0.0	18.0	25.0

Last updated: 16 February 2023.
Source: KSS

=== Head coaches records ===
Head Coach	Competition	G	W	L	PF	PA	PD	Win %
Vladimir Jovanović	Adriatic League	5	4	1	411	377	+34	.800
Vladimir Jovanović	EuroLeague	7	1	6	499	563	–64	.143
Vladimir Jovanović	Total	12	5	7	910	940	–30	.417
Duško Ivanović	Adriatic League	13	13	0	1171	897	+274	1.000
Duško Ivanović	EuroLeague	17	10	7	1316	1311	+5	.588
Duško Ivanović	Radivoj Korać Cup	3	3	0	268	218	+50	1.000
Duško Ivanović	Total	33	26	7	2,844	2,490	+354	.788

Last updated: 18 February 2023

== See also ==
- 2022–23 Red Star Belgrade season
