= Miodrag Dinić =

Serbian basketball player and coach

Personal information
- Born: May 6, 1980 (age 46) Majdanpek, SR Serbia, Yugoslavia
- Listed height: 1.97 m (6 ft 6 in)

Career information
- NBA draft: 2002: undrafted
- Playing career: 1998–2013
- Position: Shooting guard
- Number: 7
- Coaching career: 2014–present

Career history

Playing
- 1998–1999: OKK Beograd
- Metalac
- Tamiš
- 2007–2008: OKK Beograd
- 2009–2012: Spartak Subotica
- 2012–2013: Sloga Petrovac

Coaching
- 2014–2020: FMP (assistant)
- 2020–2022: Crvena zvezda (assistant)
Medals
Men's basketball
Assistant coach for Serbia
U20 European Championship Division B
| Gold medal – first place | 2022 Georgia | Team |

Miodrag Dinić (Serbian Cyrillic: Миодраг Динић; born May 6, 1980) is a Serbian professional basketball coach and former player.

== Playing career ==
A shooting guard, Dinić played for OKK Beograd, Metalac, and Tamiš. He played for Spartak Subotica from 2009 to 2012. He retired as a player with Sloga Petrovac in 2013.

== Coaching career ==
Dinić joined the FMP coaching staff in 2014 as an assistant coach. He was a staff member of FMP head coaches Slobodan Klipa, Branko Maksimović and Dušan Alimpijević. In July 2017, he became the first assistant coach of FMP.

In December 2020, Dinić was named an assistant coach for Crvena zvezda under Dejan Radonjić. Following the Radonjić's departure in July 2022, he joined the staff of new Zvezda's head coach Vladimir Jovanović. On 19 November 2022, the club parted ways with his following the Jovanović departure.

=== National teams ===
Dinić was an assistant coach for Serbia national under-18 team at the 2015 FIBA Europe Under-18 Championship and 2019 FIBA U18 European Championship, both held in Volos, Greece.

In July 2022, Dinić was an assistant coach for the Serbian under-20 national team that won a gold medal at the 2022 FIBA U20 European Championship Division B in Tbilisi, Georgia.

== Career achievements ==
As assistant coach:

- Adriatic League champion: 2 (with Crvena zvezda: 2020–21, 2021–22)
- Serbian League champion: 2 (with Crvena zvezda: 2020–21, 2021–22)
- Serbian Cup winner: 2 (with Crvena zvezda: 2020–21, 2021–22)
