= Vladan Radonjić =

Serbian strength and conditioning coach

Vladan Radonjić Владан Радоњић
Crvena zvezda Meridianbet
- Positions: Strength and conditioning coach
- League: ABA League; Basketball League of Serbia; EuroLeague

Personal information
- Born: 15 June 1979 (age 47) Gornji Milanovac, SR Serbia, Yugoslavia

Career history

Coaching
- 2007–2008: Swisslion Vršac (conditioning)
- 2008–2010: Partizan (conditioning)
- 2010: CSKA Moscow (conditioning)
- 2011–2012: Partizan (conditioning)
- 2012: Donetsk (conditioning)
- 2014: Igokea (conditioning)
- 2020–2021: Partizan (conditioning)
- 2022–present: Crvena zvezda (conditioning)
Medals
Men's basketball
Conditioning Coach for Serbia
U18 European Championship
Gold medal – first place	2009 France	U18 Team

Vladan Radonjić (Serbian Cyrillic: Владан Радоњић; born 15 June 1979) is a Serbian professional basketball strength and conditioning coach for Crvena zvezda of the EuroLeague and the ABA League. Further, he worked as a volleyball coach.

== Early life and education ==
Radonjić was born in Gornji Milanovac, SR Serbia, SFR Yugoslavia, where he finished an elementary and a high school. He earned his bachelor's degree in physical education from the University of Belgrade in 2002 and earned his doctor's degree from Singidunum University in 2013. In 2004, he worked for the Serbian Institute of Sport and Sports Medicine.

== Coaching career in basketball ==
In the 2007–08 BLS season, Radonjić worked for Swisslion Vršac as a strength and conditioning coach. In 2008, he joined the coaching staff of Partizan under head coach Duško Vujošević. He won three titles (Adriatic League, Serbian League, and Serbian Cup) in each of two season with Partizan, 2008–09 and 2009–10. In 2010, he accompanied Vujošević to CSKA Moscow. For the 2011–12 season, he returned to Partizan, at the time coached by Vlada Jovanović.

In 2012, he worked for Donetsk. In 2014, he worked for Igokea.

In November 2020, Radonjić joined the coaching staff of Partizan led by Sašo Filipovski.

In July 2022, Crvena zvezda hired Radonjić as their new strength and conditioning coach.

=== National teams ===
In July/August 2009, Radonjić was a conditioning coach for the Serbia national under-18 team that won a gold medal at the FIBA Europe Under-18 Championship. Later, he briefly worked for the Montenegro national team under Luka Pavićević.

== Coaching career in volleyball ==
Radonjić worked for women teams Rabita Baku (2013–2014), Volero Zürich (2014–2017), and Cannes (2017–2019).

== Career achievements ==
Basketball career

- Adriatic League champion: 2 (with Partizan: 2008–09, 2009–10)
- Serbian League champion: 3 (with Partizan: 2008–09, 2009–10, 2011–12)
- Championship of Bosnia and Herzegovina champion: 1 (with Igokea: 2013–14)
- Serbian Cup winner: 3 (with Partizan: 2008–09, 2009–10, 2011–12)

Volleyball career

- Swiss Women's Volleyball League champion: 3 (with Volero Zürich: 2014–15, 2015–16, 2016–17)
- Azerbaijan Women's Volleyball Super League champion: 1 (with Rabita Baku: 2013–14)
- French Women's Volleyball League champion: 1 (with Cannes: 2018–19)
- Swiss Volleyball Cup winner: 3 (with Volero Zürich: 2014–15, 2015–16, 2016–17)
- French Women's Volleyball Cup winner: 1 (with Cannes: 2017–18)
