= Vladimir Jovanović (basketball) =

Serbian basketball coach

Mitteldeutscher
- Position: Head coach
- League: Basketball Bundesliga

Personal information
- Born: 15 March 1984 (age 42) Mladenovac, SR Serbia, SFR Yugoslavia
- Coaching career: 2012–present

Career history

Coaching
- 2012–2016: FMP (assistant)
- 2016–2017: Crvena zvezda U-16
- 2017–2020: FMP
- 2021–2022: Cibona
- 2022: Crvena zvezda
- 2023–2024: Igokea
- 2024–2025: Zielona Góra
- 2026–present: Mitteldeutscher
Medals
Men's basketball
Head coach for Serbia
U20 European Championship Division B
Gold medal – first place	2022 Georgia	Team

Vladimir Jovanović (Serbian Cyrillic: Владимир Јовановић; born 15 March 1984) is a Serbian professional basketball coach, who currently serves as the head coach for Mitteldeutscher of the Basketball Bundesliga (BBL).

== Coaching career ==
=== FMP (2012–2020) ===
Jovanović was an assistant coach for the FMP as a part of coaching staff of coaches Milan Gurović and Slobodan Klipa from 2012 to 2016. During the 2016–17 season, he worked with the Crvena zvezda under-16 team and won the national championship.

On 27 July 2017, Jovanović returns to FMP as the head coach. He made his Adriatic League debut as the head coach on 29 September in a 74–67 road loss to Cedevita. Jovanović got his first taste of the NBA through Summer League coaching stint in the 2018 season with the Los Angeles Clippers. In July 2020, he signed a two-year extension with FMP. On 14 December 2020, Jovanović and FMP have parted ways on mutual consent, following a 2–6 record on the start of the 2020–21 ABA season.

=== Cibona (2021–2022) ===
On 2 February 2021, Croatian team Cibona hired Jovanović as their new head coach. He is the first Cibona's head coach from Serbia after Dragan Šakota in 1990. On 8 January 2022, Cibona and Jovanović parted ways on mutual consent, following a 83–73 loss to Zabok. He finished his stint in Zagreb with a 39–25 record.

=== Crvena zvezda (2022) ===
On 8 July 2022, Crvena zvezda hired Jovanović as their new head coach. On 13 November 2022, he parted ways with the club. Under his guidance, Crvena zvezda recorded one win and six losses in the EuroLeague and had a 4–1 record in ABA play.

=== Zielona Góra (2024–2025) ===
On December 1, 2024, he signed with Zielona Góra of the Polish Basketball League (PLK).

=== Mitteldeutscher BC (2026–present) ===
On May 17, 2026, he signed with Mitteldeutscher BC of the Basketball Bundesliga (BBL).

== National team coaching career ==
Jovanović was an assistant coach for the Serbia U18 national team at the 2016 FIBA U18 European Championship in Turkey.

On 5 December 2019, Jovanović was named an assistant coach for the Serbia national team under Igor Kokoškov. In September 2021, he left the National team as the assistant coach.

In December 2021, the Basketball Federation of Serbia named him the new head coach of the Serbia national under-20 team. His team won a gold medal at the 2022 FIBA U20 European Championship Division B in Tbilisi, Georgia with an undefeated record at 7–0.

== Coaching record ==
Legend
G	Games coached	W	Games won	L	Games lost	W–L %	Win-loss %

Note: The EuroLeague is not the only competition in which the team played during the season. He also coached in domestic competition, and regional competition if applicable.

=== EuroLeague ===
Team	Year	G	W	L	W–L%	Result
Crvena zvezda	2022–23	7	1	6	.143	Parted ways
Career		7	1	6	.143	

== Personal life ==
Jovanović and his wife Jelena has two children, a son Vasilije and daughter Lenka (born 2020).
