= 2022 ABA League First Division Playoffs =

European basketball league matches

Tournament details
- Dates: 30 April – 6 June 2022
- Season: 2021–22
- Teams: 6
- Defending champions: (Serbia) Crvena zvezda mts

Final positions
- Champions: (Serbia) Crvena zvezda mts (6th title)
- Runners-up: (Serbia) Partizan NIS
- Semifinalists: (Montenegro) Budućnost VOLI; (Slovenia) Cedevita Olimpija

Awards
- Best player: (Serbia) Ognjen Dobrić

The 2022 ABA League First Division Playoffs is the basketball play-off tournament that decides the winner of the 2021–22 ABA League First Division season.

== Qualified teams ==
1. (Serbia) Partizan NIS
2. (Serbia) Crvena zvezda mts
3. (Montenegro) Budućnost VOLI
4. (Slovenia) Cedevita Olimpija
5. (Bosnia and Herzegovina) Igokea m:tel
6. (Serbia) FMP Meridian

== Bracket ==
On 13 September 2021, the ABA League JTD decided that six highest-placed clubs from the Regular season will qualify for the Playoffs.

Preliminary Round
(Slovenia) Cedevita Olimpija	2
(Bosnia and Herzegovina) Igokea m:tel	0
(Montenegro) Budućnost VOLI	2
(Serbia) FMP Meridian	0

Semifinals
(Serbia) Crvena zvezda mts	2
(Slovenia) Cedevita Olimpija	1
(Serbia) Partizan NIS	2
(Montenegro) Budućnost VOLI	1

Finals
(Serbia) Crvena zvezda mts	3
(Serbia) Partizan NIS	2

== Preliminary round ==
Team 1	Series	Team 2	Game 1	Game 2	Game 3
Budućnost VOLI (Montenegro)	2–0	(Serbia) FMP Meridian	76−70	79−74	—
Cedevita Olimpija (Slovenia)	2–0	(Bosnia and Herzegovina) Igokea m:tel	93–79	74−69	—

=== Game 1 ===
==== Budućnost VOLI vs. FMP Meridian ====
30 April 2022	Budućnost VOLI (Montenegro)	76–70 (Series: 1−0)	(Serbia) FMP Meridian	Podgorica
21:00	Scoring by quarter: 24−14, 13−15, 15−21, 24−20
Arena Sport	Pts: Cobbs 18; Rebs: Nikolić 6 Asts: Popović, Perry 3 PIR: Popović 17	Boxscore	Pts: Tasić 16; Rebs: Nerandžić 9 Asts: three players 3 PIR: Stepanović 13	Arena: Morača Sports Center; Attendance: 2,450; Referees: Milan Nedović, Josip Radojković, Mario Majkić

Starters:			Pts	Reb	Ast
G	1	(United States) Justin Cobbs	18	4	0
G	8	(United States) D. J. Seeley	11	5	1
F	5	(Serbia) Vladimir Micov	2	3	1
PF	21	(Serbia) Marko Jagodić-Kuridža	7	3	1
C	19	(Montenegro) Zoran Nikolić	2	6	1
Reserves:					
F	3	(Bosnia and Herzegovina) Edin Atić	8	3	1
SG	4	(Montenegro) Suad Šehović	DNP		
PF	6	(Montenegro) Filip Barović	9	2	2
PF	7	(Montenegro) Danilo Nikolić	5	2	0
G	22	(Montenegro) Igor Drobnjak	DNP		
SG	30	(Montenegro) Petar Popović	9	4	3
G	55	(United States) Kendrick Perry	5	0	3
Head coach:
(Basketball Federation of Serbia) Aleksandar Džikić

Budućnost VOLI	FMP Meridian

BUD	Statistics	FMP
17/35 (48.6%)	2-pt field goals	17/29 (58.6%)
8/23 (34.8%)	3-pt field goals	10/31 (32.3%)
18/24 (75%)	Free throws	6/13 (46.2%)
9	Offensive rebounds	7
23	Defensive rebounds	23
32	Total rebounds	30
13	Assists	15
15	Turnovers	17
11	Steals	7
1 (1)	Blocks	1 (1)
15 (24)	Fouls	24 (15)

Starters:			Pts	Reb	Ast
G	7	(Serbia) Milutin Vujičić	6	2	2
G	13	(Serbia) Marko Radonjić	15	3	3
F	24	(Serbia) Nenad Nerandžić	7	9	3
PF	12	(Serbia) Danilo Tasić	16	4	0
C	15	(Nigeria) Ebuka Izundu	3	1	1
Reserves:					
SG	1	(United States) Garrett Nevels	3	1	3
C	5	(Serbia) Marko Pavićević	7	3	2
F	10	(Serbia) Nikola Šaranović	0	3	0
F	22	(Serbia) Ranko Simović	0	0	0
F	26	(Serbia) Aleksa Stepanović	13	4	1
SG	55	(Serbia) Nikola Manojlović	DNP		
F	77	(Bosnia and Herzegovina) Stefan Lakić	DNP		
Head coach:
(Basketball Federation of Serbia) Nenad Stefanović

==== Cedevita Olimpija vs. Igokea m:tel ====
30 April 2022	Cedevita Olimpija (Slovenia)	93–79 (Series: 1−0)	(Bosnia and Herzegovina) Igokea m:tel	Ljubljana
19:00	Scoring by quarter: 29−26, 25−21, 19−18, 20−14
Arena Sport	Pts: Pullen 21; Rebs: Ejim 11; Asts: Pullen 6 PIR: Pullen 22	Boxscore	Pts: Ilić 19; Rebs: Ilić 12; Asts: Robinson 7 PIR: Ilić 28	Arena: Tivoli Hall; Attendance: 1,500; Referees: Ilija Belošević, Uroš Obrknežević, Krunoslav Peić

Starters:			Pts	Reb	Ast
SG	0	(United States) Jacob Pullen	21	1	6
G	1	(United States) Yogi Ferrell	17	1	2
SG	35	(Slovenia) Zoran Dragić	18	4	1
F	8	(Slovenia) Edo Murić	11	6	2
C	24	(Slovenia) Alen Omić	4	10	1
Reserves:					
F	3	(Canada) Melvin Ejim	9	11	5
G	7	(Slovenia) Dan Duščak	DNP		
C	9	(United States) Zach Auguste	13	3	1
SG	20	(Slovenia) Alen Hodžić	DNP		
F	23	(Slovenia) Luka Ščuka	DNP		
PF	31	(Serbia) Marko Radovanović	0	2	2
SG	45	(Slovenia) Mirko Mulalić	DNP		
Head coach:
(Basketball Federation of Slovenia) Jurica Golemac

Cedevita Olimpija	Igokea m:tel

COL	Statistics	IGO
21/38 (55.3%)	2-pt field goals	18/38 (47.4%)
14/28 (50%)	3-pt field goals	12/25 (48%)
9/14 (64.3%)	Free throws	7/12 (58.3%)
17	Offensive rebounds	12
21	Defensive rebounds	16
38	Total rebounds	28
20	Assists	20
10	Turnovers	8
4	Steals	6
1 (1)	Blocks	1 (1)
18 (19)	Fouls	19 (18)

Starters:			Pts	Reb	Ast
G	8	(United States) James Robinson	13	0	7
SG	24	(United States) Antabia Waller	4	3	2
F	16	(Serbia) Marko Jošilo	12	2	4
PF	22	(Serbia) Dalibor Ilić	19	12	0
PF	23	(United States) Deshawn Stephens	13	3	2
Reserves:					
G	4	(Serbia) Milan Vulić	0	0	0
PF	10	(Serbia) Nikola Tanasković	5	1	1
SG	12	(Serbia) Aleksa Radanov	9	6	4
PG	19	(Bosnia and Herzegovina) Darko Talić	DNP		
F/C	42	(Serbia) Stefan Fundić	DNP		
C	45	(Serbia) Stefan Đorđević	4	1	0
Head coach:
(Basketball Federation of Bosnia and Herzegovina) Dragan Bajić

=== Game 2 ===
==== FMP Meridian vs. Budućnost VOLI ====
7 May 2022	FMP Meridian (Serbia)	74–79 (Series: 0−2)	(Montenegro) Budućnost VOLI	Belgrade
21:00	Scoring by quarter: 25−25, 21−15, 10−19, 18−20
Arena Sport	Pts: Tasić 17; Rebs: Tasić 9 Asts: Jones 6 PIR: Tasić 23	Boxscore	Pts: Cobbs 16; Rebs: Nikolić 7 Asts: Perry 6 PIR: Cobbs 21	Arena: Železnik Hall; Attendance: 2,332; Referees: Saša Pukl, Tomislav Hordov, Denis Hadžić

Starters:			Pts	Reb	Ast
G	8	(United States) Bryce Jones	9	2	6
G	13	(Serbia) Marko Radonjić	14	7	4
SF	22	(Serbia) Ranko Simović	5	3	0
PF	12	(Serbia) Danilo Tasić	17	9	4
C	15	(Nigeria) Ebuka Izundu	10	2	0
Reserves:					
SG	1	(United States) Garrett Nevels	7	2	1
C	5	(Serbia) Marko Pavićević	2	4	0
G	7	(Serbia) Milutin Vujičić	4	0	0
F	10	(Serbia) Nikola Šaranović	0	0	0
F	24	(Serbia) Nenad Nerandžić	2	2	0
F	26	(Serbia) Aleksa Stepanović	4	1	0
SG	55	(Serbia) Nikola Manojlović	0	1	0
Head coach:
(Basketball Federation of Serbia) Nenad Stefanović

FMP Meridian	Budućnost VOLI

FMP	Statistics	BUD
21/38 (55.3%)	2-pt field goals	19/39 (48.7%)
7/23 (30.4%)	3-pt field goals	6/22 (27.3%)
11/14 (78.6%)	Free throws	23/27 (85.2%)
7	Offensive rebounds	3
26	Defensive rebounds	24
33	Total rebounds	27
15	Assists	21
18	Turnovers	15
9	Steals	13
4 (3)	Blocks	3 (4)
27 (20)	Fouls	20 (27)

Starters:			Pts	Reb	Ast
G	1	(United States) Justin Cobbs	16	3	3
G	8	(United States) D. J. Seeley	7	1	2
F	5	(Serbia) Vladimir Micov	12	1	0
PF	21	(Serbia) Marko Jagodić-Kuridža	11	5	4
C	19	(Montenegro) Zoran Nikolić	4	3	0
Reserves:					
F	3	(Bosnia and Herzegovina) Edin Atić	7	1	1
SG	4	(Montenegro) Suad Šehović	DNP		
PF	6	(Montenegro) Filip Barović	8	4	3
PF	7	(Montenegro) Danilo Nikolić	6	7	1
G	22	(Montenegro) Igor Drobnjak	DNP		
SG	30	(Montenegro) Petar Popović	2	0	1
G	55	(United States) Kendrick Perry	6	2	6
Head coach:
(Basketball Federation of Serbia) Aleksandar Džikić

==== Igokea m:tel vs. Cedevita Olimpija ====
7 May 2022	Igokea m:tel (Bosnia and Herzegovina)	69–74 (Series: 0−2)	(Slovenia) Cedevita Olimpija	Laktaši
19:00	Scoring by quarter: 16−16, 20−23, 19−18, 14−17
	Pts: Ilić 16; Rebs: Ilić 12; Asts: Robinson 4 PIR: Ilić 26	Boxscore	Pts: Ferrell 17; Rebs: Omić 8 Asts: Pullen 5 PIR: Ejim 18	Arena: Laktaši Sports Hall; Attendance: 1,100; Referees: Miloš Koljenšić, Igor Dragojević, Bojan Kruljac

Starters:			Pts	Reb	Ast
G	8	(United States) James Robinson	8	3	4
SG	24	(United States) Antabia Waller	13	2	0
F	16	(Serbia) Marko Jošilo	5	3	3
PF	22	(Serbia) Dalibor Ilić	16	12	2
PF	23	(United States) Deshawn Stephens	10	5	0
Reserves:					
G	4	(Serbia) Milan Vulić	0	0	1
PF	10	(Serbia) Nikola Tanasković	4	2	1
SG	12	(Serbia) Aleksa Radanov	9	3	2
F/C	42	(Serbia) Stefan Fundić	0	0	0
C	45	(Serbia) Stefan Đorđević	4	4	0
Head coach:
(Basketball Federation of Bosnia and Herzegovina) Dragan Bajić

Igokea m:tel	Cedevita Olimpija

IGO	Statistics	COL
19/41 (46.3%)	2-pt field goals	11/21 (52.4%)
5/22 (22.7%)	3-pt field goals	14/39 (35.9%)
16/18 (88.9%)	Free throws	10/20 (50%)
10	Offensive rebounds	11
24	Defensive rebounds	23
34	Total rebounds	34
13	Assists	14
9	Turnovers	10
6	Steals	4
1 (0)	Blocks	0 (1)
21 (18)	Fouls	18 (21)

Starters:			Pts	Reb	Ast
G	1	(United States) Yogi Ferrell	17	2	2
SG	30	(Slovenia) Zoran Dragić	10	4	1
G/F	11	(Slovenia) Jaka Blažič	7	3	1
F	8	(Slovenia) Edo Murić	0	1	0
C	24	(Slovenia) Alen Omić	0	8	2
Reserves:					
SG	0	(United States) Jacob Pullen	14	4	5
F	3	(Canada) Melvin Ejim	16	3	3
C	9	(United States) Zach Auguste	8	5	0
SG	20	(Slovenia) Alen Hodžić	DNP		
F	23	(Slovenia) Luka Ščuka	DNP		
PF	31	(Serbia) Marko Radovanović	2	4	0
SG	45	(Slovenia) Mirko Mulalić	DNP		
Head coach:
(Basketball Federation of Slovenia) Jurica Golemac

== Semifinals ==
Team 1	Series	Team 2	Game 1	Game 2	Game 3
Crvena zvezda mts (Serbia)	2–1	(Slovenia) Cedevita Olimpija	93−82	80–88 (OT)	88–78
Partizan NIS (Serbia)	2–1	(Montenegro) Budućnost VOLI	82−66	71−72	101–77

=== Game 1 ===
==== Crvena zvezda mts vs. Cedevita Olimpija ====
12 May 2022	Crvena zvezda mts (Serbia)	93–82 (Series: 1−0)	(Slovenia) Cedevita Olimpija	Belgrade
19:00	Scoring by quarter: 26–23, 27–25, 18–15, 22–19
	Pts: Mitrović 21; Rebs: Mitrović, Kuzmić 7 Asts: Kalinić 6 PIR: Mitrović 28	Boxscore	Pts: Blažič 20; Rebs: Omić 8 Asts: Blažič 5 PIR: Blažič 20	Arena: Aleksandar Nikolić Hall; Attendance: 6,076; Referees: Saša Pukl, Uroš Nikolić, Luka Kardum

Starters:			Pts	Reb	Ast
G	3	(United States) Nate Wolters	10	5	5
SG	14	(United States) Austin Hollins	6	3	0
F	12	(Serbia) Nikola Kalinić	17	4	6
PF	30	(United States) Aaron White	10	6	1
C	32	(Serbia) Ognjen Kuzmić	0	7	1
Reserves:					
F	2	(Serbia) Stefan Lazarević	0	0	0
F	7	(Serbia) Dejan Davidovac	8	2	0
PF	9	(Serbia) Luka Mitrović	21	7	1
SG	10	(Serbia) Branko Lazić	0	2	1
SG	13	(Serbia) Ognjen Dobrić	5	0	2
G	20	(Montenegro) Nikola Ivanović	16	1	2
G	27	(Serbia) Stefan Marković	0	1	2
Head coach:
(Basketball Federation of Montenegro) Dejan Radonjić

Crvena zvezda mts	Cedevita Olimpija

CZV	Statistics	COL
28/41 (68.3%)	2-pt field goals	24/43 (55.8%)
6/28 (21.4%)	3-pt field goals	8/25 (32%)
19/22 (86.4%)	Free throws	10/17 (58.8%)
13	Offensive rebounds	10
25	Defensive rebounds	18
38	Total rebounds	28
21	Assists	20
11	Turnovers	12
7	Steals	7
2 (4)	Blocks	4 (2)
19 (25)	Fouls	25 (19)

Starters:			Pts	Reb	Ast
G	0	(United States) Yogi Ferrell	4	1	2
SG	11	(Slovenia) Jaka Blažič	20	5	5
SG	30	(Slovenia) Zoran Dragić	12	2	0
F	8	(Slovenia) Edo Murić	14	1	2
C	24	(Slovenia) Alen Omić	11	8	4
Reserves:					
SG	0	(United States) Jacob Pullen	10	2	4
F	3	(Canada) Melvin Ejim	3	5	2
C	9	(United States) Zach Auguste	8	3	1
SG	20	(Slovenia) Alen Hodžić	DNP		
F	23	(Slovenia) Luka Ščuka	DNP		
PF	31	(Serbia) Marko Radovanović	0	1	0
SG	45	(Slovenia) Mirko Mulalić	DNP		
Head coach:
(Basketball Federation of Slovenia) Jurica Golemac

==== Partizan NIS vs. Budućnost VOLI ====
10 May 2022	Partizan NIS (Serbia)	82–66 (Series: 1−0)	(Montenegro) Budućnost VOLI	Belgrade
19:00	Scoring by quarter: 18–15, 23–13, 20–21, 21–17
	Pts: LeDay 19; Rebs: Lessort 9 Asts: Lessort 6 PIR: Lessort 27	Boxscore	Pts: Seeley 16; Rebs: Jagodić-Kuridža 10; Asts: Perry 4 PIR: Cobbs 17	Arena: Aleksandar Nikolić Hall; Attendance: 6,500; Referees: Matej Boltauzer, Josip Radojković, Mario Majkić

Starters:			Pts	Reb	Ast
G	41	(Israel) Yam Madar	2	3	3
G	24	(Slovenia) Gregor Glas	0	1	0
SG	32	(Serbia) Uroš Trifunović	7	1	0
C	2	(United States) Zach LeDay	19	3	1
C	26	(France) Mathias Lessort	11	9	6
Reserves:					
SG	0	(United States) Kevin Punter	13	2	3
PF	1	(Serbia) Tristan Vukčević	1	1	0
F	3	(Serbia) Rade Zagorac	4	4	2
SG	4	(Serbia) Aleksa Avramović	10	3	5
C	5	(Serbia) Balša Koprivica	4	4	2
PF	9	(Serbia) Alen Smailagić	6	3	1
G	14	(United States) Dallas Moore	5	0	1
Head coach:
(Basketball Federation of Serbia) Željko Obradović

Partizan NIS	Budućnost VOLI

PAR	Statistics	BUD
20/33 (60.6%)	2-pt field goals	15/32 (46.9%)
9/25 (36%)	3-pt field goals	10/34 (29.4%)
15/20 (75%)	Free throws	6/10 (60%)
5	Offensive rebounds	10
29	Defensive rebounds	21
34	Total rebounds	31
24	Assists	16
11	Turnovers	9
8	Steals	9
7 (0)	Blocks	0 (7)
17 (20)	Fouls	20 (17)

Starters:			Pts	Reb	Ast
G	1	(United States) Justin Cobbs	14	5	2
G	55	(United States) Kendrick Perry	8	1	4
F	5	(Serbia) Vladimir Micov	3	3	1
PF	21	(Serbia) Marko Jagodić-Kuridža	7	10	1
C	19	(Montenegro) Zoran Nikolić	2	5	1
Reserves:					
F	3	(Bosnia and Herzegovina) Edin Atić	2	2	2
SG	4	(Montenegro) Suad Šehović	DNP		
PF	6	(Montenegro) Filip Barović	2	0	1
PF	7	(Montenegro) Danilo Nikolić	0	2	1
G	8	(United States) D. J. Seeley	16	1	3
G	22	(Montenegro) Igor Drobnjak	DNP		
SG	30	(Montenegro) Petar Popović	12	2	0
Head coach:
(Basketball Federation of Serbia) Aleksandar Džikić

=== Game 2 ===
==== Cedevita Olimpija vs. Crvena zvezda mts ====
16 May 2022	Cedevita Olimpija (Slovenia)	88–80(OT) (Series: 1−1)	(Serbia) Crvena zvezda mts	Ljubljana
18:30	Scoring by quarter: 24–29, 19–15, 16–10, 17–22, Overtime: 12–4
	Pts: Murić 21; Rebs: Omić 8 Asts: Dragić 6 PIR: Murić 27	Boxscore	Pts: Dobrić 15; Rebs: Mitrović 7 Asts: Nate Wolters, Hollins 4 PIR: Dobrić 17	Arena: Arena Stožice; Attendance: 9,000; Referees: Milivoje Jovčić, Milan Nedović, Igor Dragojević

Starters:			Pts	Reb	Ast
G	0	(United States) Yogi Ferrell	11	2	5
SG	11	(Slovenia) Jaka Blažič	12	5	3
SG	30	(Slovenia) Zoran Dragić	11	6	6
F	8	(Slovenia) Edo Murić	21	7	0
C	24	(Slovenia) Alen Omić	10	8	1
Reserves:					
SG	0	(United States) Jacob Pullen	8	1	3
F	3	(Canada) Melvin Ejim	6	5	0
C	9	(United States) Zach Auguste	9	5	0
SG	20	(Slovenia) Alen Hodžić	DNP		
F	23	(Slovenia) Luka Ščuka	DNP		
PF	31	(Serbia) Marko Radovanović	0	0	0
SG	45	(Slovenia) Mirko Mulalić	DNP		
Head coach:
(Basketball Federation of Slovenia) Jurica Golemac

Cedevita Olimpija	Crvena zvezda mts

COL	Statistics	CZV
21/38 (55.3%)	2-pt field goals	16/40 (40%)
5/21 (23.8%)	3-pt field goals	14/42 (33.3%)
31/42 (73.8%)	Free throws	6/15 (40%)
6	Offensive rebounds	13
33	Defensive rebounds	31
39	Total rebounds	44
18	Assists	17
11	Turnovers	18
7	Steals	4
5 (2)	Blocks	2 (5)
27 (31)	Fouls	31 (25)

Starters:			Pts	Reb	Ast
G	3	(United States) Nate Wolters	14	6	4
SG	14	(United States) Austin Hollins	14	4	4
F	12	(Serbia) Nikola Kalinić	9	6	2
PF	30	(United States) Aaron White	7	4	1
C	32	(Serbia) Ognjen Kuzmić	0	3	0
Reserves:					
F	2	(Serbia) Stefan Lazarević	DNP		
F	7	(Serbia) Dejan Davidovac	2	2	2
PF	9	(Serbia) Luka Mitrović	11	7	2
SG	10	(Serbia) Branko Lazić	5	2	0
SG	13	(Serbia) Ognjen Dobrić	15	6	1
G	20	(Montenegro) Nikola Ivanović	3	2	1
G	27	(Serbia) Stefan Marković	0	2	0
Head coach:
(Basketball Federation of Montenegro) Dejan Radonjić

==== Budućnost VOLI vs. Partizan NIS ====
15 May 2022	Budućnost VOLI (Montenegro)	72–71 (Series: 1−1)	(Serbia) Partizan NIS	Podgorica
20:45	Scoring by quarter: 20–17, 18–10, 17–22, 17–22
	Pts: Popović, Perry 15; Rebs: Nikolić, Jagodić-Kuridža 6 Asts: Cobbs 2 PIR: Popović 19	Boxscore	Pts: LeDay 28; Rebs: LeDay 8 Asts: Avramović 4 PIR: LeDay 37	Arena: Morača Sports Center; Attendance: 4,550; Referees: Damir Javor, Tomislav Hordov, Denis Hadžić

Starters:			Pts	Reb	Ast
G	1	(United States) Justin Cobbs	13	0	2
G	55	(United States) Kendrick Perry	15	5	1
F	5	(Serbia) Vladimir Micov	8	2	1
PF	21	(Serbia) Marko Jagodić-Kuridža	6	6	1
C	19	(Montenegro) Zoran Nikolić	8	4	0
Reserves:					
F	3	(Bosnia and Herzegovina) Edin Atić	2	3	1
SG	4	(Montenegro) Suad Šehović	DNP		
PF	6	(Montenegro) Filip Barović	3	3	0
PF	7	(Montenegro) Danilo Nikolić	2	6	1
G	8	(United States) D. J. Seeley	0	2	0
G	22	(Montenegro) Igor Drobnjak	0	0	0
SG	30	(Montenegro) Petar Popović	15	1	0
Head coach:
(Basketball Federation of Serbia) Aleksandar Džikić

Budućnost VOLI	Partizan NIS

BUD	Statistics	PAR
18/36 (50%)	2-pt field goals	15/28 (53.6%)
6/20 (30%)	3-pt field goals	9/23 (39.1%)
18/24 (75%)	Free throws	14/26 (53.8%)
10	Offensive rebounds	6
22	Defensive rebounds	22
32	Total rebounds	28
7	Assists	15
13	Turnovers	13
7	Steals	6
2 (1)	Blocks	1 (2)
28 (24)	Fouls	24 (28)

Starters:			Pts	Reb	Ast
G	41	(Israel) Yam Madar	9	1	2
SG	0	(United States) Kevin Punter	0	2	2
SG	32	(Serbia) Uroš Trifunović	0	0	0
C	2	(United States) Zach LeDay	28	8	1
C	26	(France) Mathias Lessort	8	5	3
Reserves:					
PF	1	(Serbia) Tristan Vukčević	DNP		
F	3	(Serbia) Rade Zagorac	7	6	2
SG	4	(Serbia) Aleksa Avramović	7	1	4
C	5	(Serbia) Balša Koprivica	2	3	0
PF	9	(Serbia) Alen Smailagić	7	2	0
G	14	(United States) Dallas Moore	3	0	1
G	24	(Slovenia) Gregor Glas	0	0	0
Head coach:
(Basketball Federation of Serbia) Željko Obradović

=== Game 3 ===
==== Crvena zvezda mts vs. Cedevita Olimpija ====
23 May 2022	Crvena zvezda mts (Serbia)	88–78 (Series: 2−1)	(Slovenia) Cedevita Olimpija	Belgrade
19:00	Scoring by quarter: 24–13, 18–24, 25–17, 21–24
	Pts: Kalinić 15; Rebs: Kuzmić 10; Asts: Ivanović 6 PIR: Ivanović, Kuzmić 17	Boxscore	Pts: Ferrell 25; Rebs: four players 4 Asts: Ferrell 5 PIR: Ferrell 32	Arena: Aleksandar Nikolić Hall; Attendance: 6,478; Referees: Ilija Belošević, Miloš Koljenšić, Mario Majkić

Starters:			Pts	Reb	Ast
G	3	(United States) Nate Wolters	5	3	5
SG	10	(Serbia) Branko Lazić	8	2	3
SG	14	(United States) Austin Hollins	7	2	1
F	12	(Serbia) Nikola Kalinić	15	2	3
C	32	(Serbia) Ognjen Kuzmić	10	4	0
Reserves:					
F	2	(Serbia) Stefan Lazarević	2	2	0
F	7	(Serbia) Dejan Davidovac	3	3	0
PF	9	(Serbia) Luka Mitrović	8	2	3
SG	13	(Serbia) Ognjen Dobrić	10	1	1
G	20	(Montenegro) Nikola Ivanović	11	1	6
G	27	(Serbia) Stefan Marković	DNP		
PF	30	(United States) Aaron White	9	1	0
Head coach:
(Basketball Federation of Montenegro) Dejan Radonjić

Crvena zvezda mts	Cedevita Olimpija

CZV	Statistics	COL
19/35 (54.3%)	2-pt field goals	19/31 (61.3%)
12/30 (40%)	3-pt field goals	10/26 (38.5%)
14/19 (73.7%)	Free throws	10/13 (76.9%)
10	Offensive rebounds	3
19	Defensive rebounds	18
29	Total rebounds	21
19	Assists	11
12	Turnovers	10
6	Steals	6
0 (2)	Blocks	2 (0)
23 (17)	Fouls	18 (23)

Starters:			Pts	Reb	Ast
G	1	(United States) Yogi Ferrell	25	0	5
SG	11	(Slovenia) Jaka Blažič	6	4	1
SG	30	(Slovenia) Zoran Dragić	21	4	0
F	8	(Slovenia) Edo Murić	6	4	1
C	24	(Slovenia) Alen Omić	6	4	1
Reserves:					
SG	0	(United States) Jacob Pullen	6	0	2
F	3	(Canada) Melvin Ejim	5	2	1
C	9	(United States) Zach Auguste	3	3	1
SG	20	(Slovenia) Alen Hodžić	DNP		
F	23	(Slovenia) Luka Ščuka	DNP		
PF	31	(Serbia) Marko Radovanović	DNP		
SG	45	(Slovenia) Mirko Mulalić	DNP		
Head coach:
(Basketball Federation of Slovenia) Jurica Golemac

==== Partizan NIS vs. Budućnost VOLI ====
22 May 2022	Partizan NIS (Serbia)	101–77 (Series: 2−1)	(Montenegro) Budućnost VOLI	Belgrade
21:00	Scoring by quarter: 26−21, 29–14, 22–24, 24–18
	Pts: Punter 30; Rebs: Koprivica 7 Asts: Avramović, Madar 5 PIR: Punter 31	Boxscore	Pts: Seeley 20; Rebs: Jagodić-Kuridža 6 Asts: Cobbs 6 PIR: Seeley 17	Arena: Aleksandar Nikolić Hall; Attendance: 6,998; Referees: Saša Pukl, Damir Javor, Sašo Petek

Starters:			Pts	Reb	Ast
SG	0	(United States) Kevin Punter	30	2	3
SG	4	(Serbia) Aleksa Avramović	9	4	5
SG	32	(Serbia) Uroš Trifunović	5	1	0
C	2	(United States) Zach LeDay	16	4	0
C	5	(Serbia) Balša Koprivica	5	7	0
Reserves:					
PF	1	(Serbia) Tristan Vukčević	4	3	0
F	3	(Serbia) Rade Zagorac	11	3	1
PF	9	(Serbia) Alen Smailagić	5	3	1
G	14	(United States) Dallas Moore	3	1	1
G	24	(Slovenia) Gregor Glas	0	0	1
C	26	(France) Mathias Lessort	10	5	2
G	41	(Israel) Yam Madar	3	1	5
Head coach:
(Basketball Federation of Serbia) Željko Obradović

Partizan NIS	Budućnost VOLI

PAR	Statistics	BUD
21/34 (61.8%)	2-pt field goals	8/19 (42.1%)
14/28 (50%)	3-pt field goals	15/34 (44.1%)
17/25 (68%)	Free throws	16/22 (72.7%)
9	Offensive rebounds	5
25	Defensive rebounds	15
34	Total rebounds	20
19	Assists	17
11	Turnovers	12
5	Steals	5
1 (1)	Blocks	1 (1)
19 (24)	Fouls	24 (19)

Starters:			Pts	Reb	Ast
G	1	(United States) Justin Cobbs	10	1	6
G	55	(United States) Kendrick Perry	15	2	2
F	5	(Serbia) Vladimir Micov	3	1	1
PF	21	(Serbia) Marko Jagodić-Kuridža	5	6	2
C	19	(Montenegro) Zoran Nikolić	2	3	3
Reserves:					
F	3	(Bosnia and Herzegovina) Edin Atić	3	1	0
SG	4	(Montenegro) Suad Šehović	DNP		
PF	6	(Montenegro) Filip Barović	1	1	0
PF	7	(Montenegro) Danilo Nikolić	8	2	1
G	8	(United States) D. J. Seeley	20	1	0
PF	13	(Lithuania) Donatas Tarolis	DNP		
SG	30	(Montenegro) Petar Popović	10	2	2
Head coach:
(Basketball Federation of Serbia) Aleksandar Džikić

== Finals ==
Team 1	Series	Team 2	Game 1	Game 2	Game 3	Game 4	Game 5
Crvena zvezda mts (Serbia)	3–2	(Serbia) Partizan NIS	90–76	85–81	67–70	84–112	80–77

=== Game 1 ===
27 May 2022	Crvena zvezda mts (Serbia)	90–76 (Series: 1–0)	(Serbia) Partizan NIS	Belgrade
20:00	Scoring by quarter: 19–23, 23–16, 24–19, 24–18
	Pts: Ivanović 18; Rebs: Davidovac 5 Asts: Kalinić, Ivanović 5 PIR: Ivanović 18	Boxscore	Pts: Punter 15; Rebs: Lessort 6 Asts: Avramović 4 PIR: Avramović 15	Arena: Aleksandar Nikolić Hall; Attendance: 6,886; Referees: Saša Pukl, Uroš Obrknežević, Josip Radojković

Starters:			Pts	Reb	Ast
G	3	(United States) Nate Wolters	11	0	3
SG	10	(Serbia) Branko Lazić	0	1	2
SG	14	(United States) Austin Hollins	7	3	1
F	12	(Serbia) Nikola Kalinić	3	3	5
C	32	(Serbia) Ognjen Kuzmić	7	3	1
Reserves:					
F	2	(Serbia) Stefan Lazarević	0	1	1
F	7	(Serbia) Dejan Davidovac	10	5	2
PF	9	(Serbia) Luka Mitrović	14	3	1
SG	13	(Serbia) Ognjen Dobrić	14	4	2
G	20	(Montenegro) Nikola Ivanović	18	0	5
G	27	(Serbia) Stefan Marković	2	0	1
PF	30	(United States) Aaron White	4	1	0
Head coach:
(Basketball Federation of Montenegro) Dejan Radonjić

Crvena zvezda mts	Partizan NIS

CZV	Statistics	PAR
23/38 (60.5%)	2-pt field goals	13/26 (50%)
11/23 (47.8%)	3-pt field goals	9/22 (40.9%)
11/16 (68.8%)	Free throws	23/25 (92%)
9	Offensive rebounds	8
15	Defensive rebounds	17
24	Total rebounds	25
24	Assists	8
6	Turnovers	15
7	Steals	1
0	Blocks	3
24	Fouls	20

Starters:			Pts	Reb	Ast
SG	0	(United States) Kevin Punter	15	0	3
SG	4	(Serbia) Aleksa Avramović	10	5	4
SG	32	(Serbia) Uroš Trifunović	0	0	0
C	2	(United States) Zach LeDay	11	3	1
C	5	(Serbia) Balša Koprivica	7	2	0
Reserves:					
PF	1	(Serbia) Tristan Vukčević	DNP		
F	3	(Serbia) Rade Zagorac	0	3	0
PF	9	(Serbia) Alen Smailagić	4	4	0
G	14	(United States) Dallas Moore	12	1	0
G	24	(Slovenia) Gregor Glas	0	0	0
C	26	(France) Mathias Lessort	9	6	0
G	41	(Israel) Yam Madar	8	1	0
Head coach:
(Basketball Federation of Serbia) Željko Obradović

=== Game 2 ===
29 May 2022	Crvena zvezda mts (Serbia)	85–81 (Series: 2−0)	(Serbia) Partizan NIS	Belgrade
20:00	Scoring by quarter: 29–18, 18–22, 15–13, 23–28
	Pts: Kalinić 25; Rebs: Mitrović 6 Asts: Wolters 8 PIR: Kalinić 29	Boxscore	Pts: Avramović 21; Rebs: LeDay, Lessort 7 Asts: four players 4 PIR: Lessort 28	Arena: Aleksandar Nikolić Hall; Attendance: 7,238; Referees: Ilija Belošević, Igor Dragojević, Mario Majkić

Starters:			Pts	Reb	Ast
G	3	(United States) Nate Wolters	6	2	8
SG	10	(Serbia) Branko Lazić	3	3	0
SG	14	(United States) Austin Hollins	11	1	3
F	12	(Serbia) Nikola Kalinić	25	4	4
C	32	(Serbia) Ognjen Kuzmić	6	1	1
Reserves:					
F	2	(Serbia) Stefan Lazarević	0	3	2
F	7	(Serbia) Dejan Davidovac	0	3	2
PF	9	(Serbia) Luka Mitrović	14	6	0
SG	13	(Serbia) Ognjen Dobrić	8	1	0
G	20	(Montenegro) Nikola Ivanović	12	2	0
G	27	(Serbia) Stefan Marković	DNP		
PF	30	(United States) Aaron White	DNP		
Head coach:
(Basketball Federation of Montenegro) Dejan Radonjić

Crvena zvezda mts	Partizan NIS

CZV	Statistics	PAR
18/34 (52.9%)	2-pt field goals	18/33 (54.5%)
10/26 (38.5%)	3-pt field goals	9/23 (39.1%)
19/24 (79.2%)	Free throws	18/23 (78.3%)
10	Offensive rebounds	8
19	Defensive rebounds	21
29	Total rebounds	29
20	Assists	16
9	Turnovers	14
7	Steals	6
2	Blocks	3
25	Fouls	25

Starters:			Pts	Reb	Ast
SG	0	(United States) Kevin Punter	9	2	2
SG	4	(Serbia) Aleksa Avramović	21	2	1
SG	32	(Serbia) Uroš Trifunović	0	0	0
C	2	(United States) Zach LeDay	11	7	0
C	5	(Serbia) Balša Koprivica	0	0	0
Reserves:					
PF	1	(Serbia) Tristan Vukčević	DNP		
F	3	(Serbia) Rade Zagorac	6	2	3
PF	9	(Serbia) Alen Smailagić	0	3	1
G	14	(United States) Dallas Moore	14	1	3
G	24	(Slovenia) Gregor Glas	DNP		
C	26	(France) Mathias Lessort	18	7	3
G	41	(Israel) Yam Madar	2	5	3
Head coach:
(Basketball Federation of Serbia) Željko Obradović

=== Game 3 ===
1 June 2022	Partizan NIS (Serbia)	70–67 (Series: 2–1)	(Serbia) Crvena zvezda mts	Belgrade
20:30	Scoring by quarter: 21–17, 18–14, 8–23, 23–13
	Pts: Punter 22; Rebs: Punter 5 Asts: Punter 6 PIR: Punter 34	Boxscore	Pts: Dobrić 20; Rebs: Kuzmić, Mitrović 5 Asts: Marković 5 PIR: Dobrić 21	Arena: Aleksandar Nikolić Hall; Attendance: 7,226; Referees: Matej Boltauzer, Uroš Nikolić, Milan Nedović

Starters:			Pts	Reb	Ast
SG	0	(United States) Kevin Punter	22	5	6
SG	4	(Serbia) Aleksa Avramović	14	4	2
SG	32	(Serbia) Uroš Trifunović	0	1	1
C	2	(United States) Zach LeDay	7	3	0
C	5	(Serbia) Balša Koprivica	5	3	1
Reserves:					
PF	1	(Serbia) Tristan Vukčević	DNP		
F	3	(Serbia) Rade Zagorac	2	4	0
PF	9	(Serbia) Alen Smailagić	2	2	0
G	14	(United States) Dallas Moore	9	2	1
G	24	(Slovenia) Gregor Glas	DNP		
C	26	(France) Mathias Lessort	2	4	0
G	41	(Israel) Yam Madar	7	2	0
Head coach:
(Basketball Federation of Serbia) Željko Obradović

Partizan NIS	Crvena zvezda mts

PAR	Statistics	CZV
17/37 (45.9%)	2-pt field goals	16/34 (47.1%)
7/20 (35%)	3-pt field goals	8/25 (32%)
15/22 (68.2%)	Free throws	11/15 (73.3%)
12	Offensive rebounds	12
18	Defensive rebounds	19
30	Total rebounds	31
11	Assists	19
14	Turnovers	16
5	Steals	6
2 (0)	Blocks	0 (2)
19 (23)	Fouls	23 (19)

Starters:			Pts	Reb	Ast
G	3	(United States) Nate Wolters	0	0	0
SG	10	(Serbia) Branko Lazić	2	1	1
SG	14	(United States) Austin Hollins	3	1	0
F	12	(Serbia) Nikola Kalinić	9	2	3
C	32	(Serbia) Ognjen Kuzmić	4	5	0
Reserves:					
F	2	(Serbia) Stefan Lazarević	2	4	0
F	7	(Serbia) Dejan Davidovac	19	4	2
PF	9	(Serbia) Luka Mitrović	2	5	3
SG	13	(Serbia) Ognjen Dobrić	20	4	2
G	20	(Montenegro) Nikola Ivanović	3	3	2
G	27	(Serbia) Stefan Marković	3	2	5
PF	30	(United States) Aaron White	0	0	1
Head coach:
(Basketball Federation of Montenegro) Dejan Radonjić

=== Game 4 ===
3 June 2022	Partizan NIS (Serbia)	112–84 (Series: 2–2)	(Serbia) Crvena zvezda mts	Belgrade
18:30	Scoring by quarter: 35–27, 33–16, 20–20, 24–21
	Pts: Avramović 24; Rebs: Lessort 5 Asts: Avramović 6 PIR: Avramović 33	Boxscore	Pts: Hollins 19; Rebs: five players 3 Asts: Ivanović 4 PIR: Hollins 18	Arena: Aleksandar Nikolić Hall; Attendance: 3,922; Referees: Damir Javor, Sašo Petek, Luka Kardum

Starters:			Pts	Reb	Ast
SG	0	(United States) Kevin Punter	9	1	2
SG	32	(Serbia) Uroš Trifunović	7	0	1
G	14	(United States) Dallas Moore	11	1	1
PF	9	(Serbia) Alen Smailagić	11	3	0
C	2	(United States) Zach LeDay	8	0	2
Reserves:					
PF	1	(Serbia) Tristan Vukčević	2	0	0
F	3	(Serbia) Rade Zagorac	2	1	0
SG	4	(Serbia) Aleksa Avramović	24	2	6
C	5	(Serbia) Balša Koprivica	2	3	0
G	24	(Slovenia) Gregor Glas	5	1	5
C	26	(France) Mathias Lessort	19	5	3
G	41	(Israel) Yam Madar	12	4	4
Head coach:
(Basketball Federation of Serbia) Željko Obradović

Partizan NIS	Crvena zvezda mts

PAR	Statistics	CZV
30/40 (75%)	2-pt field goals	14/27 (51.9%)
13/23 (56.5%)	3-pt field goals	8/27 (29.6%)
13/15 (86.7%)	Free throws	32/41 (78%)
7	Offensive rebounds	16
14	Defensive rebounds	12
21	Total rebounds	28
24	Assists	14
13	Turnovers	15
7	Steals	6
2 (2)	Blocks	2 (2)
35 (22)	Fouls	22 (33)

Starters:			Pts	Reb	Ast
G	3	(United States) Nate Wolters	8	2	2
SG	14	(United States) Austin Hollins	19	3	0
F	7	(Serbia) Dejan Davidovac	4	1	1
F	12	(Serbia) Nikola Kalinić	3	2	1
C	32	(Serbia) Ognjen Kuzmić	6	3	0
Reserves:					
F	2	(Serbia) Stefan Lazarević	1	3	1
PF	9	(Serbia) Luka Mitrović	2	3	0
SG	10	(Serbia) Branko Lazić	4	2	0
SG	13	(Serbia) Ognjen Dobrić	16	2	2
G	20	(Montenegro) Nikola Ivanović	8	2	4
G	27	(Serbia) Stefan Marković	11	3	3
PF	30	(United States) Aaron White	2	2	0
Head coach:
(Basketball Federation of Montenegro) Dejan Radonjić

=== Game 5 ===
6 June 2022	Crvena zvezda mts (Serbia)	80–77 (Series: 3–2)	(Serbia) Partizan NIS	Belgrade
20:00	Scoring by quarter: 18–20, 15–17, 26–21, 21–19
	Pts: Davidovac 15; Rebs: Davidovac, Kalinić 6 Asts: Wolters 7 PIR: Davidovac 20	Boxscore	Pts: Punter 27; Rebs: Lessort 13; Asts: Avramović 4 PIR: Punter 21	Arena: Aleksandar Nikolić Hall; Attendance: 5,634; Referees: Saša Pukl, Tomislav Hordov, Miloš Koljenšić

Starters:			Pts	Reb	Ast
G	3	(United States) Nate Wolters	12	3	7
SG	14	(United States) Austin Hollins	9	2	1
SG	10	(Serbia) Branko Lazić	5	2	0
F	12	(Serbia) Nikola Kalinić	11	6	2
C	32	(Serbia) Ognjen Kuzmić	4	2	0
Reserves:					
F	2	(Serbia) Stefan Lazarević	0	1	1
F	7	(Serbia) Dejan Davidovac	15	6	0
PF	9	(Serbia) Luka Mitrović	10	3	1
SG	13	(Serbia) Ognjen Dobrić	5	3	2
G	20	(Montenegro) Nikola Ivanović	2	0	0
G	27	(Serbia) Stefan Marković	7	2	1
PF	30	(United States) Aaron White	DNP		
Head coach:
(Basketball Federation of Montenegro) Dejan Radonjić

Crvena zvezda mts	Partizan NIS

CZV	Statistics	PAR
22/36 (61.1%)	2-pt field goals	16/33 (48.5%)
7/29 (24.1%)	3-pt field goals	8/25 (32%)
15/15 (100%)	Free throws	21/25 (84%)
12	Offensive rebounds	14
18	Defensive rebounds	14
30	Total rebounds	28
15	Assists	12
16	Turnovers	19
9	Steals	9
2 (0)	Blocks	0 (2)
25 (20)	Fouls	20 (25)

Starters:			Pts	Reb	Ast
SG	0	(United States) Kevin Punter	27	1	2
G	14	(United States) Dallas Moore	11	1	1
F	3	(Serbia) Rade Zagorac	2	2	2
PF	9	(Serbia) Alen Smailagić	3	3	0
C	2	(United States) Zach LeDay	9	1	1
Reserves:					
PF	1	(Serbia) Tristan Vukčević	DNP		
SG	4	(Serbia) Aleksa Avramović	12	5	4
C	5	(Serbia) Balša Koprivica	DNP		
G	24	(Slovenia) Gregor Glas	DNP		
C	26	(France) Mathias Lessort	9	13	2
SG	32	(Serbia) Uroš Trifunović	0	0	0
G	41	(Israel) Yam Madar	4	2	0
Head coach:
(Basketball Federation of Serbia) Željko Obradović

== See also ==
- 2022 ABA League Second Division Playoffs
