= Uroš Trifunović =

Serbian basketball player (born 2000)

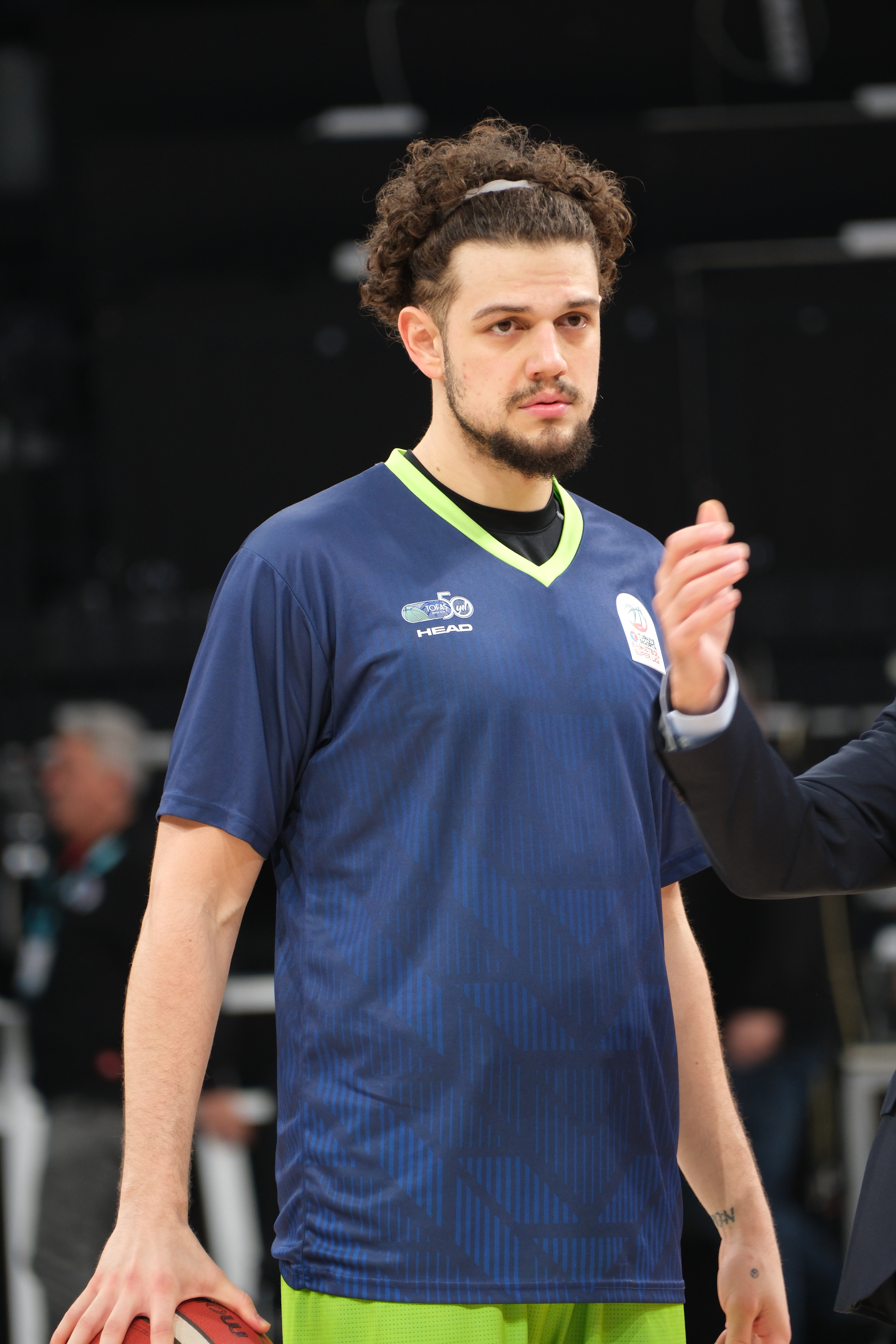
- Trifunović with Tofaş in 2025

No. 10 – Türk Telekom
- Position: Shooting guard / small forward
- League: Basketbol Süper Ligi

Personal information
- Born: 5 December 2000 (age 25) Belgrade, Serbia, FR Yugoslavia
- Listed height: 2.01 m (6 ft 7 in)
- Listed weight: 96 kg (212 lb)

Career information
- NBA draft: 2022: undrafted
- Playing career: 2018–present

Career history
- 2018–2024: Partizan
- 2018–2019: →Mladost Zemun
- 2019: →Mega Bemax
- 2024–2025: Tofaş
- 2025: Maccabi Tel Aviv
- 2025–present: Türk Telekom

Career highlights
- ABA League champion (2023); 2× Serbian Cup winner (2019, 2020)
Medals
Men's basketball
Representing Serbia
FIBA Europe Under-18 Championship
Gold medal – first place	2018 Latvia	U18 Team

Uroš Trifunović (Serbian Cyrillic: Урош Трифуновић; born 5 December 2000) is a Serbian professional basketball player for Türk Telekom of the Turkish Basketbol Süper Ligi (BSL).

== Early career ==
Trifunović started to play basketball in his hometown Belgrade, for the Zemun youth selections. In Summer 2015, he joined the Mega Bemax. During the 2017–18 season, he played in Turkey for the junior team of Pınar Karşıyaka, where his father Aleksandar coached the first team.

== Professional career ==
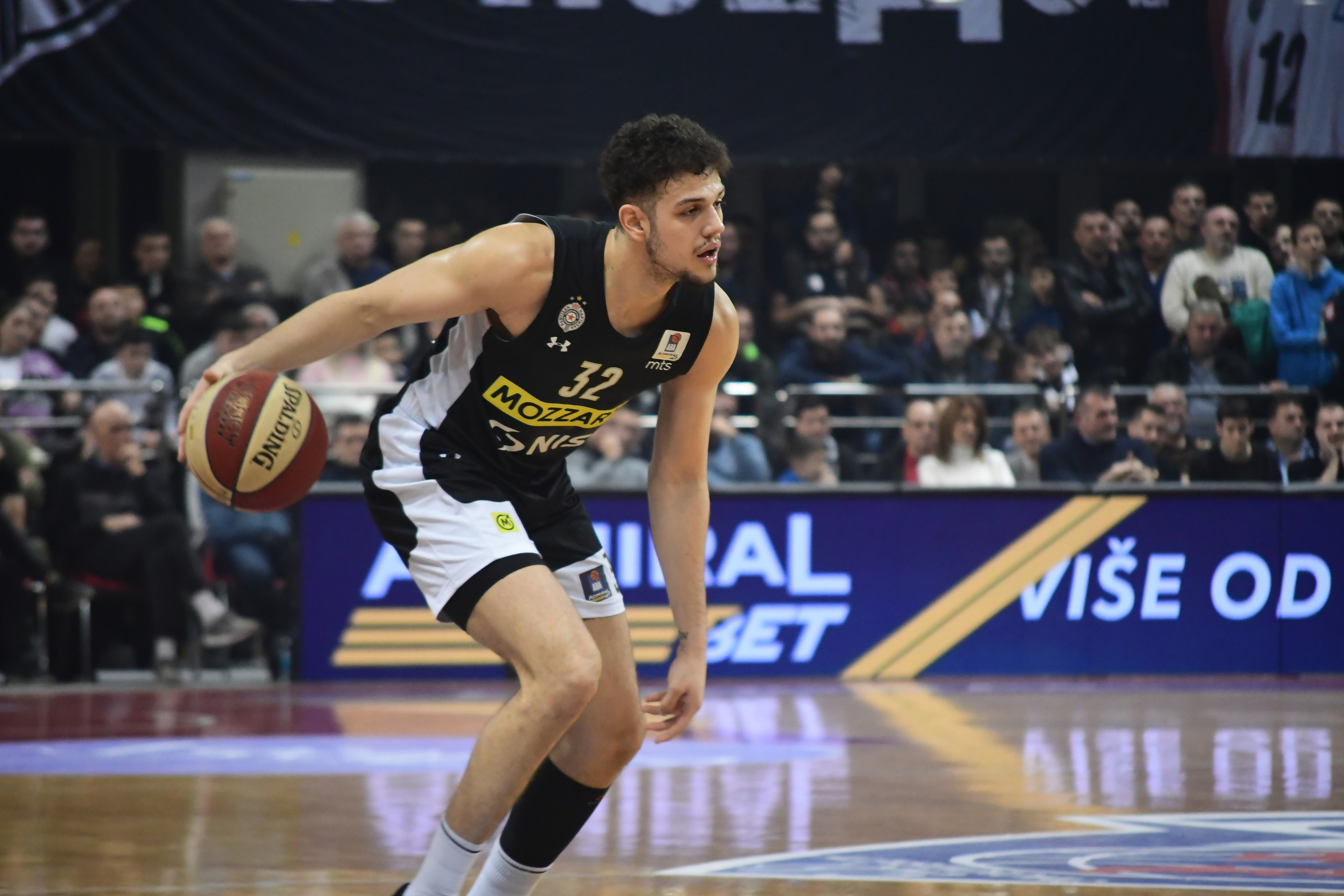
Trifunović with Partizan in 2022

=== Partizan (2018–2024) ===
In September 2018, Trifunović joined Partizan. Prior to the 2018–19 season, he was loaned out to Mladost Zemun. On July 4, 2019, he was loaned out to Mega Bemax for the 2019–20 season.

Trifunović played in Mega Bemax in the first two rounds of the ABA League, after which he left the club dissatisfied with the minutes and the role in the team. The loan was officially terminated on October 18, 2019, after which Trifunović returned to Partizan. On April 24, he declared for the 2020 NBA draft, but later withdrew. On June 27, 2020, Trifunović signed a four-year contract extension for Partizan. On July 19, 2021, he withdrawn his name once again from consideration for the 2021 NBA draft. Finally, he went undrafted in the 2022 NBA draft after becoming automatically eligible.

During the 2022–23 season, Trifunović for the first time played in EuroLeague where Partizan was eliminated from the Real Madrid in tight playoffs series. Over the season, Trifunović averaged 1.7 points over 35 games. Partizan ended the 2022–23 season by lifting the ABA League championship trophy, after 3–2 score against Crvena zvezda in the Finals series.

The 2023–24 season was deemed to be unsuccessful for Partizan as they finished the season without lifting any trophy.

On July 26, 2024, Trifunović amicably parted ways with the Serbian powerhouse after six years together.

=== Tofaş (2024–2025) ===
On August 31, 2024, he signed with Tofaş of the Turkish Basketbol Süper Ligi (BSL).

=== Maccabi Tel Aviv (2025) ===
On August 7, 2025, Trifunović signed with Maccabi Tel Aviv of the Israeli Ligat HaAl and the EuroLeague.

=== Türk Telekom (2025–present) ===
On November 9, 2025, he signed with Türk Telekom of the Turkish Basketbol Süper Ligi (BSL).

== National team career ==
Trifunović was a member of the Serbian under-18 team that won the gold medal at the 2018 FIBA Europe Under-18 Championship in Latvia. Over seven tournament games, he averaged 10.0 points, 2.3 rebounds and 4.4 assists per game.

Trifunović was a member of the Serbian under-19 team that finished 7th at the 2019 FIBA Under-19 Basketball World Cup in Heraklion, Greece. Over seven tournament games, he averaged 14.0 points, 2.0 rebounds and 3.1 assists per game.

In February 2020, he received the first invitation for the senior Serbia national team. Coach Igor Kokoškov included him on the list of players for the matches against Finland and Georgia in the qualifications for EuroBasket 2022. Trifunović made his debut for the senior team on February 20, 2020, in an 80–58 win over Finland.

== Career statistics ==
Legend
GP	Games played	GS	Games started	MPG	Minutes per game
FG%	Field-goal percentage	3P%	3-point field-goal percentage	FT%	Free-throw percentage
RPG	Rebounds per game	APG	Assists per game	SPG	Steals per game
BPG	Blocks per game	PPG	Points per game	PIR	Performance index rating
**Bold**	Career high

=== EuroLeague ===
Year	Team	GP	GS	MPG	FG%	3P%	FT%	RPG	APG	SPG	BPG	PPG	PIR
2022–23	Partizan	**35**	**11**	8.7	.400	**.429**	.667	.9	**.5**	**.3**	—	1.7	1.7
2023–24	Partizan	19	5	**13.9**	**.422**	.320	**1.000**	**1.5**	**.5**	**.3**	**.1**	**2.8**	**2.8**
Career		54	16	10.5	.410	.377	.857	1.1	.5	.3	.0	2.1	2.1

=== EuroCup ===
Year	Team	GP	GS	MPG	FG%	3P%	FT%	RPG	APG	SPG	BPG	PPG	PIR
2019–20	Partizan	9	1	13.2	**.415**	**.350**	.889	1.7	**.8**	.2	—	**5.4**	**5.6**
2020–21	Partizan	**14**	1	11.6	.292	.292	.600	1.3	.4	**.4**	—	2.9	1.2
2021–22	Partizan	13	**3**	**18.1**	.406	.235	**1.000**	**2.1**	**.8**	.1	.1'	5.2	4.6
Career		36	5	14.3	.373	.282	.808	1.7	.6	.3	.0	4.4	3.5

=== Domestic leagues ===
Year	Team	League	GP	MPG	FG%	3P%	FT%	RPG	APG	SPG	BPG	PPG
2018–19	(Serbia) Mladost Zemun	KLS	25	32.3	.437	.373	.803	3.1	3.0	.8	—	13.8
2018–19	(Serbia) Partizan	KLS	7	11.0	.444	.438	.833	1.1	.7	.3	—	5.1
2018–19	(Serbia) Partizan	ABA	2	3.9	—	—	—	—	.5	—	—	0.0
2019–20	(Serbia) Mega	ABA	2	17.2	.267	.000	1.000	2.5	1.0	—	—	5.5
2019–20	(Serbia) Partizan	ABA	8	14.6	.351	.250	.556	1.2	.2	.1	—	4.4
2020–21	(Serbia) Partizan	KLS	5	20.4	.500	.533	.857	1.4	.6	.4	—	9.6
2020–21	(Serbia) Partizan	ABA	22	15.5	.390	.385	.778	1.5	.9	.2	.0	5.6
2021–22	(Serbia) Partizan	ABA	28	15.6	.444	.339	.650	1.4	.7	.5	.0	4.3
2022–23	(Serbia) Partizan	ABA	35	16.2	.527	.448	.806	1.4	.9	.3	.0	6.3
2023–24	(Serbia) Partizan	KLS	4	32.2	.486	.412	.500	5.2	1.0	.2	—	11.5
2023–24	(Serbia) Partizan	ABA	19	18.6	.469	.365	.667	2.7	.9	.8	.0	5.9

== Personal life ==
His father Aleksandar Trifunović is a professional basketball coach and former player.
