= Stefan Lazarević (basketball) =

Serbian basketball player (born 1996)

No. 9 – Spartak Subotica
- Position: Small forward / power forward
- League: Serbian SuperLeague; ABA League; FIBA Champions League

Personal information
- Born: August 20, 1996 (age 30) Belgrade, FR Yugoslavia
- Listed height: 2.00 m (6 ft 7 in)
- Listed weight: 100 kg (220 lb)

Career information
- NBA draft: 2018: undrafted
- Playing career: 2014–present

Career history
- 2014–2024: Crvena zvezda
- 2014–2017 2018–2021: →FMP
- 2024–2025: FMP
- 2025–2026: Bilbao Basket
- 2026–present: Spartak Subotica

Career highlights
- FIBA Europe Cup champion (2026); 2× ABA League champion (2022, 2024); 3× Serbian League champion (2022, 2023, 2024); 3× Serbian Cup winner (2022, 2023, 2024); Euroleague IJT champion (2014)
Medals
Men's basketball
Representing Serbia
U18 European Championship
Silver medal – second place	2014 Turkey	Team
FIBA Europe Under-16 Championship
Bronze medal – third place	2012 Lithuania & Latvia	Team

Stefan Lazarević (Serbian Cyrillic: Стефан Лазаревић, born 20 August 1996) is a Serbian professional basketball player for Spartak Subotica of the Serbian SuperLeague, the ABA League, and the FIBA Champions League.

== Professional career ==
Lazarević grew up with the Crvena zvezda youth system. He won the 2014 Euroleague NIJT. On March 8, 2014, Lazarević made his professional debut for Crvena zvezda in the ABA League win over Krka, making 1 steal in under 2 minutes of playing time. On August 29, 2014, Lazarević signed a four-year contract for Crvena zvezda. He was loaned out to FMP for the 2014–15 season. Also, he was loaned out to FMP in the next two seasons.

On September 13, 2017, Lazarević signed his second four-year contract for the Zvezda. On October 13, 2017, he made his EuroLeague debut against Žalgiris, making his only two-point attempt in under 5 minutes of playing time. In December 2017, he was loaned out to FMP for the rest of the 2017–18 season. On February 17, 2018, Lazarević injured left knee during the Radivoj Korać Cup Semifinal game. He was later ruled out for the rest of the season. Lazarević was ruled out for the entire 2018–19 season, even he was added to the 2019 FMP Serbian SuperLeague roster.

On December 20, 2019, Lazarević recorded an assist for 3 minutes played in a 84–81 win over Krka. It was the first official game since his injury on February 17, 2018.

In July 2021, Lazarević ended his term with FMP and returns to Crvena zvezda.

On July 18, 2023, Lazarević signed a new three-year contract with Crvena zvezda.

On July 31, 2025, he signed with Bilbao Basket of the Liga ACB.

== National team career ==
Lazarević was a member of the Serbian under-16 team that won the bronze medal at the 2012 FIBA Europe Under-16 Championship in Latvia and Lithuania. Over nine tournament games, he averaged 6.1 points, 10.4 rebounds and 1.0 assists per game. He was a member of the Serbian under-18 team that won the silver medal at the 2014 FIBA Europe Under-18 Championship in Konya, Turkey. Over nine tournament games, he averaged 13.1 points, 7.9 rebounds and 1.3 assists per game. He was named to the All-Tournament Team. Lazarević was a member of the Serbian under-19 team that played at the 2015 FIBA Under-19 World Championship in Heraklion, Greece . Over four tournament games, he averaged 4.5 points, 4.0 rebounds and 0.5 assists per game. He was a member of the Serbian under-20 team that played at the 2016 FIBA Europe Under-20 Championship in Helsinki, Finland. Over seven tournament games, he averaged 10.9 points, 8.1 rebounds and 2.1 assists per game.

== Career statistics ==
Legend
GP	Games played	GS	Games started	MPG	Minutes per game
FG%	Field-goal percentage	3P%	3-point field-goal percentage	FT%	Free-throw percentage
RPG	Rebounds per game	APG	Assists per game	SPG	Steals per game
BPG	Blocks per game	PPG	Points per game	PIR	Performance index rating
**Bold**	Career high

=== EuroLeague ===
Year	Team	GP	GS	MPG	FG%	3P%	FT%	RPG	APG	SPG	BPG	PPG	PIR
2017–18	Crvena zvezda	4	0	3.0	.500	—	**1.000**	.5	—	.3	—	0.8	0.5
2021–22	Crvena zvezda	21	5	12.4	**.600**	**.364**	.857	1.4	**.5**	**.5**	.0	**2.8**	2.3
2022–23	Crvena zvezda	**30**	**18**	**17.9**	.449	.333	.813	**2.8**	**.5**	.3	—	2.7	**2.5**
2023–24	Crvena zvezda	19	2	6.9	.500	.333	**1.000**	.9	.2	.2	—	1.2	0.5
Career		74	25	12.7	.504	.342	.846	1.8	.4	.3	.0	2.2	1.9

=== Domestic leagues ===
Year	Team	League	GP	MPG	FG%	3P%	FT%	RPG	APG	SPG	BPG	PPG
2013–14	(Serbia) Crvena zvezda	ABA	1	2.0	—	—	—	—	—	1.0	—	0.0
2014–15	(Serbia) FMP	KLS	31	24.8	.487	.292	.667	4.3	.9	1.1	.1	5.9
2015–16	(Serbia) FMP	KLS	39	22.8	.546	.097	.763	6.4	1.9	1.0	.0	9.0
2016–17	(Serbia) FMP	KLS	13	21.5	.537	.250	.615	3.5	1.5	.8	.2	7.0
2016–17	(Serbia) FMP	ABA	26	24.0	.433	.239	.667	5.0	1.4	.6	.2	7.5
2017–18	(Serbia) Crvena zvezda	ABA	6	7.8	.375	.000	.500	2.0	.5	.2	.2	1.2
2017–18	(Serbia) FMP	ABA	8	26.8	.553	.333	.727	6.6	1.7	.6	.4	10.0
2019–20	(Serbia) FMP	ABA	10	12.4	.348	.286	.333	2.3	.7	.3	—	1.9
2020–21	(Serbia) FMP	KLS	1	35.3	.400	.000	1.000	13.0	1.0	—	—	11.0
2020–21	(Serbia) FMP	ABA	24	31.5	.483	.359	.770	4.9	2.0	1.1	.3	10.8
2021–22	(Serbia) Crvena zvezda	KLS	5	19.3	.923	1.000	.500	2.8	.2	2.2	.2	5.4
2021–22	(Serbia) Crvena zvezda	ABA	29	13.9	.456	.276	.900	2.0	.7	.5	.0	3.7
2022–23	(Serbia) Crvena zvezda	KLS	2	17.0	.333	—	1.000	2.5	1.5	—	—	4.0
2022–23	(Serbia) Crvena zvezda	ABA	31	16.6	.458	.250	.727	2.6	.8	.4	.1	4.0
2023–24	(Serbia) Crvena zvezda	KLS	3	19.0	.750	.500	—	1.7	.7	1.3	.7	4.3
2023–24	(Serbia) Crvena zvezda	ABA	24	10.3	.528	.318	.773	1.6	.4	.3	.0	3.3
