= Nikola Kalinić (basketball) =

Serbian basketball player and coach (born 1991)

Nikola Kalinić Никола Калинић
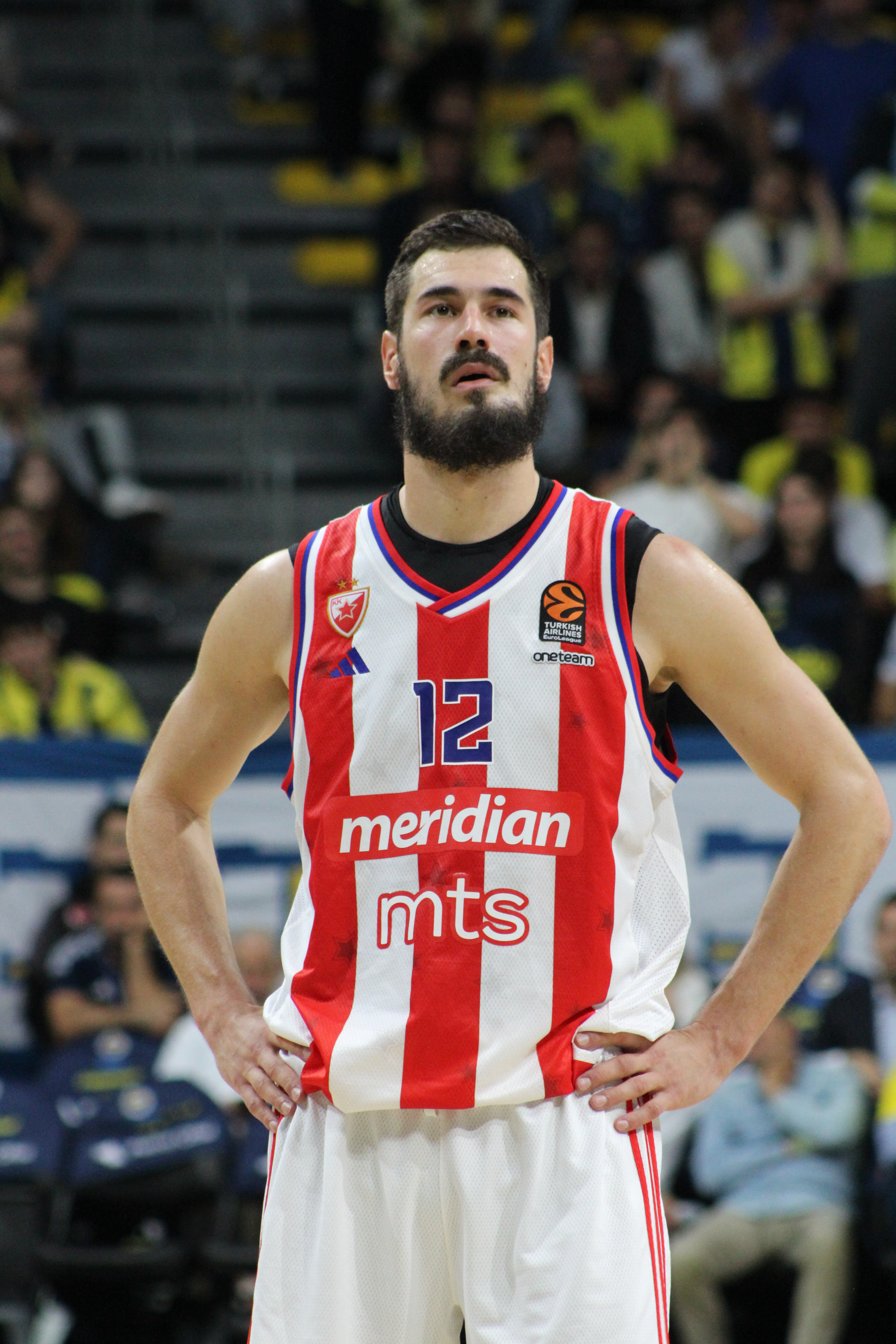
- Kalinić with Crvena zvezda in 2024.

Crvena zvezda
- Title: Assistant coach
- League: KLS; ABA League; EuroLeague

Personal information
- Born: 8 November 1991 (age 35) Subotica, SR Serbia, SFR Yugoslavia
- Listed height: 2.03 m (6 ft 8 in)
- Listed weight: 105 kg (231 lb)

Career information
- NBA draft: 2013: undrafted
- Playing career: 2009–2026
- Position: Power forward / small forward
- Number: 33, 12
- Coaching career: 2026–present

Career history

Playing
- 2009–2010: Spartak Subotica
- 2010–2011: Novi Sad
- 2011–2013: Vojvodina Srbijagas
- 2013–2014: Radnički Kragujevac
- 2014–2015: Crvena zvezda
- 2015–2020: Fenerbahçe
- 2020–2021: Valencia
- 2021–2022: Crvena zvezda
- 2022–2024: FC Barcelona
- 2024–2026: Crvena zvezda

Coaching
- 2026–present: Crvena zvezda (assistant)

Career highlights
- EuroLeague champion (2017); Liga ACB champion (2023); 2× ABA League champion (2015, 2022); 2× Serbian League champion (2015, 2022); 3× Serbian Cup winner (2015, 2022, 2025, 2026); 3× TBSL champion (2016–2018); 3× Turkish Cup winner (2016, 2019, 2020); 2× Turkish President's Cup winner (2016, 2017); EuroLeague Finals Top Scorer (2017); ABA League MVP (2022); All-ABA League Team (2022)
Medals
Men's basketball
Representing Serbia
Summer Olympics
Silver medal – second place	2016 Rio de Janeiro	Team
World Cup
Silver medal – second place	2014 Spain	Team
Mediterranean Games
Silver medal – second place	2013 Mersin	Team
Universiade
Bronze medal – third place	2013 Kazan	Team

Nikola Kalinić Kalina (Serbian Cyrillic: Никола Калинић Kalina; born 8 November 1991) is a Serbian professional basketball coach and former player who currently serves as an assistant coach for Crvena zvezda. A 2.03 m (6 ft 8 in) tall small forward, he also represented the Serbian national basketball team.

== Professional career ==
=== Early years ===
Kalinić made his professional debut with his hometown team Spartak Subotica. In the 2010–11 season, he played with KK Novi Sad, and then from 2011 to 2013, he played with Vojvodina Srbijagas.

In July 2013, he signed a three-year contract with Radnički Kragujevac. Over 25 games played in the ABA League, he averaged 6.4 points and 4 rebounds per game.

=== Crvena zvezda ===
On 21 July 2014, Kalinić signed a three-year contract with Crvena zvezda.In his debut EuroLeague season, he averaged 9.2 points, 3.9 rebounds and 2 assists per game, over 24 games played. In his first season with the club, he won a triple crown, winning the Serbian League, Serbian Cup, and ABA League.

=== Fenerbahçe ===
On 31 July 2015, Crvena zvezda announced that Kalinić moved to Fenerbahçe, for a buyout amount of €1 million euros. On 12 August 2015, Fenerbahçe officially announced that Kalinić had signed a two-year contract, with the option of an additional year.

In his first season with the team, Kalinić won the Turkish Cup title, in a 67–65 win over Darüşşafaka. Fenerbahçe also reached the finals game of the 2016 Euroleague Final Four, but fell short of winning the EuroLeague championship, after an overtime 96–101 loss to CSKA Moscow. Over 29 EuroLeague games played that season, he averaged 4.6 points and 3.3 rebounds per game. At the end of the season, Fenerbahçe also won the Turkish League championship.

On 7 July 2017, Kalinić re-signed with Fenerbahçe for three more seasons. In the 2017–18 EuroLeague season, Fenerbahçe made it to the 2018 EuroLeague Final Four, the club's fourth consecutive Final Four appearance. Eventually, they lost to Real Madrid, by a score of 80–85 in the finals game. Over 19 EuroLeague games played that season, he averaged 5.5 points, 1.6 rebounds and 1.2 assists per game.

=== Valencia ===
On 18 July 2020, Kalinić officially moved to Spanish EuroLeague club Valencia on a one-year contract.

=== Return to Crvena zvezda ===
On 15 July 2021, Crvena zvezda announced that they had signed with Kalinić. On 27 April 2022, Kalinić was selected the 2021–22 ABA League MVP. The club won ABA League, Serbian League, and Serbian Cup in the 2021–22 season.

=== FC Barcelona ===
On 12 July 2022, Kalinić signed a two-year deal with FC Barcelona, after an agreement was also reached between Barcelona and Valencia concerning his Spanish league contract rights.

=== Third stint with Crvena zvezda and coaching transition ===
On 21 June 2024, Kalinić signed a three-year deal with Crvena zvezda. He won the Serbian Cup with Crvena zvezda in 2025 and 2026. In August 2026, he announced retirement from playing the professional basketball; starting with the 2026–27 season, he joined the coaching staff of Crvena zvezda as an assistant coach.

== National team career ==
Kalinić represented the senior Serbia men's national basketball team at the EuroBasket 2013. He was also a member of the Serbian national basketball team that won the silver medal at the 2014 FIBA World Cup, under new head coach Aleksandar Đorđević.

He represented Serbia once again at the EuroBasket 2015. In the first phase of the tournament, Serbia dominated in the tournament's toughest group, Group B, with a 5–0 record, and then eliminated Finland and Czech Republic in the round of 16 and quarterfinal games, respectively. However, they were stopped in the semifinal game by Lithuania, by a score of 67–64, and eventually lost to the host team France, in the bronze-medal game, by a score of 81–68. Over 9 tournament games played, Kalinić averaged 5.8 points, 2.1 rebounds and 1.7 assists per game, on 69% shooting from the field and 33.3% shooting from the free-throw line.

Kalinić also represented Serbia at the 2016 Summer Olympics, where they won the silver medal, after losing to the United States in the final game, by a score of 96–66.

== Career statistics ==
Legend
GP	Games played	GS	Games started	MPG	Minutes per game
FG%	Field-goal percentage	3P%	3-point field-goal percentage	FT%	Free-throw percentage
RPG	Rebounds per game	APG	Assists per game	SPG	Steals per game
BPG	Blocks per game	PPG	Points per game	PIR	Performance index rating
**Bold**	Career high

=== EuroLeague ===
†	Denotes seasons in which Kalinić won the EuroLeague

Year	Team	GP	GS	MPG	FG%	3P%	FT%	RPG	APG	SPG	BPG	PPG	PIR
2014–15	Crvena zvezda	24	10	26.0	.429	.355	.627	**3.9**	2.0	.8	.2	9.2	9.1
2015–16	Fenerbahçe	29	13	18.9	.434	.242	.711	3.3	1.2	.4	.2	4.6	5.4
2016–17†	Fenerbahçe	33	20	24.0	.482	.347	.837	3.1	1.5	.8	.3	7.5	8.3
2017–18	Fenerbahçe	19	13	17.5	.494	.286	.800	1.6	1.2	.5	.2	5.5	5.4
2018–19	Fenerbahçe	35	16	25.5	.484	.398	.785	3.3	1.8	.7	.2	9.6	10.5
2019–20	Fenerbahçe	26	12	22.9	.426	.314	**.870**	2.5	1.7	.8	.1	6.6	6.2
2020–21	Valencia	34	25	26.6	**.533**	.333	.789	3.4	3.2	.9	**.4**	10.4	**12.3**
2021–22	Crvena zvezda	32	32	**30.1**	.436	.276	.717	3.9	**3.4**	**1.0**	.1	**12.6**	11.7
2022–23	Barcelona	38	26	22.5	.478	.405	.700	3.3	1.6	.7	.2	6.4	7.7
2023–24	Barcelona	**39**	**38**	24.6	.429	.406	.581	3.8	2.4	.8	.1	7.3	8.3
2024–25	Crvena zvezda	35	35	27.2	.516	**.435**	.675	**4.1**	2.6	.8	.1	9.0	11.6
2025–26	Crvena zvezda	**39**	25	24.6	.449	.400	.673	3.5	1.8	.5	.3	5.8	6.2
Career		383	265	24.3	.466	.362	.729	3.4	2.1	.7	.2	7.9	8.7

=== EuroCup ===
Year	Team	GP	GS	MPG	FG%	3P%	FT%	RPG	APG	SPG	BPG	PPG	PIR
2013–14	Radnički Kragujevac	16	15	25.6	.575	.381	.688	3.5	2.6	1.0	.3	10.2	12.3
Career		16	15	25.6	.575	.381	.688	3.5	2.6	1.0	.3	10.2	12.3

=== Domestic leagues ===
Year	Team	League	GP	MPG	FG%	3P%	FT%	RPG	APG	SPG	BPG	PPG
2010–11	(Serbia) Novi Sad	KLS	23	23.2	.454	.238	.806	3.4	.7	1.3	.7	7.7
2011–12	(Serbia) Vojvodina Srbijagas	KLS	34	24.4	.511	.323	.726	3.8	1.7	1.6	.4	9.0
2012–13	(Serbia) Vojvodina Srbijagas	KLS	42	25.8	.556	.371	.772	4.2	2.0	1.3	.3	10.4
2013–14	(Serbia) Radnički Kragujevac	KLS	16	29.3	.488	.347	.796	5.2	2.7	1.0	.5	11.1
2013–14	(Serbia) Radnički Kragujevac	ABA	25	23.1	.386	.300	.731	4.0	1.4	.9	.3	6.4
2014–15	(Serbia) Crvena zvezda	KLS	18	23.1	.489	.358	.627	3.9	1.9	1.5	.3	9.9
2014–15	(Serbia) Crvena zvezda	ABA	34	22.8	.512	.382	.718	4.1	1.5	1.0	.6	10.1
2015–16	(Turkey) Fenerbahçe	TBSL	37	20.6	.503	.379	.758	3.1	1.7	.6	.3	6.6
2016–17	(Turkey) Fenerbahçe	TBSL	34	24.5	.500	.412	.743	2.9	2.0	.9	.1	8.4
2018–19	(Turkey) Fenerbahçe	TBSL	30	27.9	.527	.364	.792	4.0	2.8	.8	.1	11.5
2019–20	(Turkey) Fenerbahçe	TBSL	15	26.7	.462	.255	.933	2.9	3.3	.9	.2	9.2
2020–21	(Spain) Valencia	ACB	41	23.3	.559	.392	.804	3.8	2.8	.9	.2	9.8
2021–22	(Serbia) Crvena zvezda	KLS	3	19.0	.571	.444	.900	2.3	4.3	1.3	.3	12.3
2021–22	(Serbia) Crvena zvezda	ABA	31	26.2	.448	.415	.736	3.4	3.3	.9	.1	11.3
2022–23	(Spain) Barcelona	ACB	38	19.0	.486	.333	.815	3.4	1.6	.5	.2	6.7
2023–24	(Spain) Barcelona	ACB	34	19.3	.436	.386	.659	3.2	1.9	.6	.1	5.6

== Coaching career ==
After announcing the retirement from playing the professional basketball, Kalinić was appointed as an assistant coach of Crvena zvezda.

== Personal life ==
Nikola is the son of former table tennis player Zoran Kalinić (born 1958), and Dragica (née Tošić), a former handball player. His older brother Uroš (b. 1986) is a water polo player for Montpellier, while his sister Mina also played handball. The children in the family all once played ping pong and went to tennis school.

Kalinić injured his chin during childhood, leaving a visibly deformed chin with surgery failing to fix it. He has said that he suffers no pain from it.

== See also ==
- List of Olympic medalists in basketball
