= Bryce Jones (basketball, born 1994) =

American basketball player

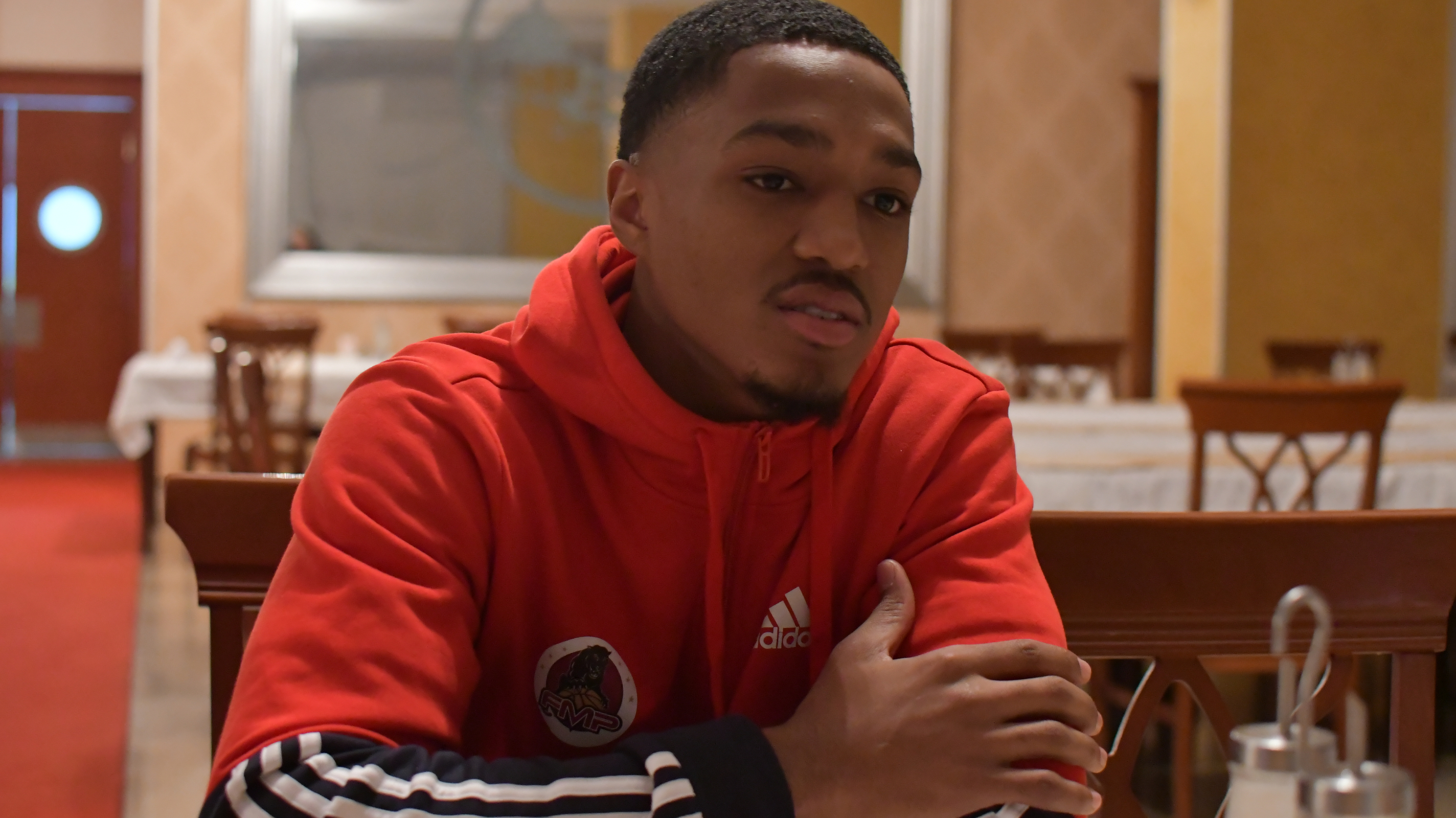
- Jones in 2022

No. 32 – Tofaş
- Position: Point guard
- League: BSL; EuroCup

Personal information
- Born: October 12, 1994 (age 32) Brooklyn, New York, U.S.
- Listed height: 6 ft 0 in (1.83 m)
- Listed weight: 175 lb (79 kg)

Career information
- High school: Boys and Girls (Brooklyn, New York)
- College: Jones County JC (2013–2015); Murray State (2015–2017)
- NBA draft: 2017: undrafted
- Playing career: 2018–present

Career history
- 2018–2019: Ulcinj
- 2019–2021: Borac Čačak
- 2021–2022: FMP
- 2022–2023: Limoges CSP
- 2023–2024: U-BT Cluj-Napoca
- 2024–2025: Igokea
- 2025–2026: Aris Thessaloniki
- 2026–present: Tofaş

Career highlights
- ABA League Top Scorer (2025); All-ABA League Team (2025); ABA League steals leader (2021); ABA League assists leader (2022); Romanian League champion (2024); Romanian League Finals MVP (2024); Romanian Cup winner (2024); Bosnian League champion (2025); Bosnian Cup winner (2025)

Bryce Tyler Jones Jr. (born October 12, 1994), is an American professional basketball player for Tofaş of the Basketbol Süper Ligi (BSL) and the EuroCup. He played college basketball for Murray State Racers.

== Professional career ==
=== Borac Čačak (2019–2021) ===
On 3 August 2019, Jones signed a one-year contract with the Serbian club Borac Čačak. On July 24, 2020, he signed a one-year contract extension with Borac. In his debut season with the club, Jones averaged 10.9 points, 4 assists and 2.9 rebounds on 44.3% shooting from the field in the 2019–20 ABA League Second Division. The season was cut short due to COVID-19 pandemic in Europe. In the following season, Borac played in the top-tier regional competition 2020–21 ABA League First Division after being promoted due to best record last season. Jones averaged 13.1 points on 42.6% shooting, 4.5 assists and 2.7 rebounds per game.

=== FMP (2021–2022) ===
On 15 June 2021, Jones signed a contract with the Serbian club FMP. Over 27 games with the team in the ABA League, Jones averaged 15.7 points, 6.7 assists and 3.1 rebounds on 45.7% shooting from the field. He parted ways with FMP on 31 May 2022.

=== Limoges (2022–2023) ===
On 27 June 2022, Jones signed a contract with the French club Limoges CSP of the LNB Pro A. With Limoges, Jones kept the starting position, averaging 15.8 points and 5.0 assists over 28 games played.

=== Cluj-Napoca (2023–2024) ===
On 28 July 2023, Jones was officially announced at the Romanian club U-BT Cluj-Napoca. With Cluj-Napoca, Jones played in the European second-tier competition EuroCup where they reached the quarterfinals. Jones averaged 11.2 points, 4.3 assists and 3.1 rebounds over 19 games played.

=== Igokea (2024–2025) ===
On October 1, 2024, he signed with Igokea in the ABA League.

=== Aris (2025–2026) ===
On August 13, 2025, he signed with Aris of the Greek Basketball League (GBL).

=== Tofaş (2026–present) ===
On June 12, 2026, he signed with Tofaş of the Basketbol Süper Ligi (BSL).
