= 2021–22 ABA League First Division =

AdmiralBet ABA League
- Season: 2021–22
- Duration: September 24, 2021 – April 23, 2022 (Regular season)
- Games played: 26 each
- Teams: 14
- TV partners: Arena Sport, RTV SLO

Regular season
- Top seed: (Serbia) Crvena zvezda mts
- Season MVP: (Serbia) Nikola Kalinić
- Promoted: (North Macedonia) MZT Skopje Aerodrom
- Relegated: (Slovenia) Krka

Finals
- Champions: (Serbia) Crvena zvezda mts (6th title)
- Runners-up: (Serbia) Partizan NIS
- Semi-finalists: (Montenegro) Budućnost VOLI (Slovenia) Cedevita Olimpija
- Finals MVP: (Serbia) Ognjen Dobrić

Awards
- Top Prospect: (Serbia) Nikola Jović
- Best Defensive Player: (Serbia) Branko Lazić
- Best Coach: (Serbia) Željko Obradović

Statistical leaders
Points	(United States) Shannon Shorter	17.0
Rebounds	(Bosnia and Herzegovina) Kenan Kamenjaš	8.42
Assists	(United States) Bryce Jones	6.67
Efficiency	(Bosnia and Herzegovina) Kenan Kamenjaš	21.04

Records
- Biggest home win: Partizan NIS 109–49 Split (5 January 2022)
- Biggest away win: Krka 52–87 Cibona (11 February 2022)
- Highest scoring: FMP 104–99 SC Derby (12 November 2021)
- Winning streak: 15 games Crvena zvezda mts
- Losing streak: 12 games Krka
- Highest attendance: 9,000; Cedevita Olimpija 88–80 Crvena zvezda mts (16 May 2022)
- Lowest attendance: 1 officially eight matches
- All statistics correct as of 6 June 2022.

The 2021–22 AdmiralBet ABA League is the 21st season of the ABA League with 14 teams from Bosnia and Herzegovina, Croatia, Montenegro, Serbia and Slovenia participating in it.

== Teams ==
=== Promotion and relegation ===
A total of 14 teams contest the league in the 2021–22 season (and until the 2024–25 season), including the 13 highest-placed teams from the previous season and the winner of the 2020–21 ABA League Second Division.

Promoted

- (Montenegro) SC Derby – 2020–21 ABA 2 Champions

Relegated

- (Slovenia) Koper Primorska – disqualified from the competition in December 2020.

=== Venues and locations ===
Location of teams in the 2021–22 season
Locations of the teams from Belgrade in the 2021–22 season

Team	Home city	Arena	Capacity
(Serbia) Borac Čačak	Čačak	Borac Hall	4,000
(Montenegro) Budućnost VOLI	Podgorica	Morača Sports Center	6,000
(Slovenia) Cedevita Olimpija	Ljubljana	Arena Stožice	12,480
(Croatia) Cibona	Zagreb	Dražen Petrović Hall	5,400
(Serbia) Crvena zvezda mts	Belgrade	Aleksandar Nikolić Hall	8,000
(Serbia) FMP Meridian	Belgrade	Železnik Hall	3,000
(Bosnia and Herzegovina) Igokea m:tel	Aleksandrovac	Laktaši Sports Hall	3,050
(Slovenia) Krka	Novo Mesto	Leon Štukelj Hall	2,500
(Serbia) Mega Mozzart	Belgrade	Ranko Žeravica Sports Hall	5,000
(Montenegro) Mornar Barsko zlato	Bar	Topolica Sport Hall	2,625
(Serbia) Partizan NIS	Belgrade	Štark Arena	18,386
(Croatia) Split	Split	Arena Gripe	3,500
(Montenegro) SC Derby	Podgorica	Morača Sports Center	6,000
(Croatia) Zadar	Zadar	Krešimir Ćosić Hall	7,997

=== Personnel and sponsorship ===
Team	Head coach	Captain	Kit manufacturer	Shirt sponsor
Borac Čačak	(Serbia) Marko Marinović	(Serbia) Uroš Čarapić	—	MozzartSport / P.S. Fashion
Budućnost VOLI	(Serbia) Aleksandar Džikić	(Montenegro) Suad Šehović	Number 1	VOLI
Cedevita Olimpija	(Slovenia) Jurica Golemac	(Slovenia) Jaka Blažič	Adidas	Cedevita
Cibona	(Slovenia) Gašper Okorn	(Croatia) Roko Prkačin	GBT	Erste Bank
Crvena zvezda mts	(Montenegro) Dejan Radonjić	(Serbia) Branko Lazić	Adidas	mts / SoccerBet
FMP Meridian	(Serbia) Nenad Stefanović	(Serbia) Marko Radonjić	Adidas	Meridian
Igokea m:tel	(Bosnia and Herzegovina) Dragan Bajić	(Serbia) Marko Jošilo	GBT	m:tel
Krka	(Slovenia) Dalibor Damjanović	(Slovenia) Luka Lapornik	Peak	Krka
Mega Mozzart	(Serbia) Vlada Jovanović	(Serbia) Luka Cerovina	Adidas	Tehnomanija
Mornar Barsko zlato	(Montenegro) Mihailo Pavićević	(Montenegro) Nemanja Vranješ	DaCapo	Bar Municipality / Barsko zlato
Partizan NIS	(Serbia) Željko Obradović	(Serbia) Rade Zagorac	Under Armour	NIS / mts
Split	(Croatia) Srđan Subotić	(Croatia) Mateo Kedžo	Macron	Optika Anda
SC Derby	(Slovenia) Andrej Žakelj	(Montenegro) Nikola Pavličević	Number 1	Derby
Zadar	(Croatia) Vladimir Anzulović	(Croatia) Dominik Mavra	Macron	OTP Bank

=== Coaching changes ===
Team	Outgoing manager	Date of vacancy	Position in table	Replaced with	Date of appointment	Ref.
FMP Meridian	(Serbia) Vanja Guša	1 June 2021	Off-season	(Serbia) Nenad Stefanović	2 June 2021	
Budućnost VOLI	(Serbia) Dejan Milojević	17 June 2021	Off-season	(Serbia) Aleksandar Džikić	22 June 2021	
Partizan NIS	(Serbia) Aleksandar Matović	25 June 2021	Off-season	(Serbia) Željko Obradović	25 June 2021	
SC Derby	(Serbia) Nenad Trajković	June 2021	Off-season	(Slovenia) Andrej Žakelj	8 July 2021	
Zadar	(Croatia) Veljko Mršić	13 July 2021	Off-season	(Croatia) Ivan Perinčić	15 July 2021	
Split	(Croatia) Mile Karakaš	13 July 2021	Off-season	(Croatia) Srđan Subotić	9 August 2021	
Zadar	(Croatia) Ivan Perinčić	18 October 2021	13th (0–4)	(Croatia) Srđan Helbich (interim)	18 October 2021	
Zadar	(Croatia) Srđan Helbich (interim)	23 October 2021	12th (1–4)	(Croatia) Vladimir Anzulović	23 October 2021	
Cibona	(Serbia) Vladimir Jovanović	8 January 2022	8th (5–9)	(Bosnia and Herzegovina) Bariša Krasić (interim)	8 January 2022	
Cibona	(Bosnia and Herzegovina) Bariša Krasić (interim)	23 January 2022	9th (5–10)	(Slovenia) Gašper Okorn	23 January 2022	

=== Referees ===
A total of 55 ABA officials set to work on the 2021–22 season in ABA 1 and ABA 2:

The list of referees for the 2021–22 season
(Bosnia and Herzegovina) Dragan Porobić; (Bosnia and Herzegovina) Ernad Karović; (Bosnia and Herzegovina) Nermin Nikšić; (Bosnia and Herzegovina) Tomislav Stapić; (Bosnia and Herzegovina) Vladimir Marić; (Croatia) Bojan Kruljac; (Croatia) Boris Hartman; (Croatia) Branimir Galić; (Croatia) Denis Hadžić; (Croatia) Gordan Terlević; (Croatia) Hrvoje Muhvić; (Croatia) Josip Radojković; (Croatia) Krunoslav Peić; (Croatia) Luka Kardum; (Croatia) Marko Stanković; (Croatia) Marko Mustapić; (Croatia) Mateo Pavičić; (Croatia) Tomislav Hordov; (Croatia) Tomislav Vovk	(Montenegro) Igor Dragojević; (Montenegro) Igor Janjušević; (Montenegro) Miloš Koljenšić; (Montenegro) Miodrag Lakićević; (Montenegro) Radoš Savović; (Montenegro) Vojislav Lepetić; (Montenegro) Zoran Radulović; (North Macedonia) Aleksandar Davidov; (North Macedonia) Boro Antovski; (North Macedonia) Vladimir Krstevski; (Serbia) Aleksandar Milojević; (Serbia) Dragan Matić; (Serbia) Dušan Sedlar; (Serbia) Ilija Belošević; (Serbia) Ivan Stefanović; (Serbia) Marko Juras; (Serbia) Marko Pecelj; (Serbia) Marko Strika; (Serbia) Milivoje Jovčić	(Serbia) Miloš Hadžić; (Serbia) Radoš Arsenijević; (Serbia) Stefan Ćalić; (Serbia) Uroš Obrknežević; (Serbia) Uroš Nikolić; (Serbia) Vladimir Vesković; (Slovenia) Damir Javor; (Slovenia) Damjan Gajšek; (Slovenia) Edo Javor; (Slovenia) Mario Majkić; (Slovenia) Matej Boltauzer; (Slovenia) Matej Špendl; (Slovenia) Miha Mauer; (Slovenia) Milan Nedović; (Slovenia) Rok Misson; (Slovenia) Saša Pukl; (Slovenia) Sašo Petek

== Regular season ==
The regular season commenced on 25 September 2021.

=== League table ===
Pos	Team	Pld	W	L	PF	PA	PD	Pts	Qualification or relegation
1	(Serbia) Crvena zvezda mts	26	24	2	2140	1819	+321	50	Advance to the semifinals
2	(Serbia) Partizan NIS	26	22	4	2178	1840	+338	48	Advance to the semifinals
3	(Montenegro) Budućnost VOLI	26	19	7	2102	1902	+200	45	Advance to the preliminary round
4	(Slovenia) Cedevita Olimpija	26	18	8	2205	2056	+149	44	Advance to the preliminary round
5	(Bosnia and Herzegovina) Igokea m:tel	26	15	11	2053	1959	+94	41	Advance to the preliminary round
6	(Serbia) FMP Meridian	26	14	12	2121	2097	+24	40	Advance to the preliminary round
7	(Montenegro) SC Derby	26	12	14	2107	2212	−105	38	
8	(Croatia) Cibona	26	11	15	2014	2005	+9	37	
9	(Montenegro) Mornar Barsko zlato	26	10	16	1986	2056	−70	36	
10	(Serbia) Mega Mozzart	26	10	16	2043	2101	−58	36	
11	(Serbia) Borac Čačak	26	9	17	1962	2098	−136	35	Qualification to the relegation playoffs
12	(Croatia) Zadar	26	8	18	1899	2046	−147	34	
13	(Croatia) Split	26	6	20	1848	2102	−254	32	
14	(Slovenia) Krka	26	4	22	1813	2178	−365	30	Relegation to the Second Division

Source: ABA League

=== Positions by round ===
Advance to the semifinals	Advance to the preliminary round	Qualification to the relegation playoffs	Relegated

Team ╲ Round	1	2	3	4	5	6	7	8	9	10	11	12	13	14	15	16	17	18	19	20	21	22	23	24	25	26
(Serbia) Crvena zvezda mts	1	1	4	2	2	2	2	2	1	1	1	1	1	1	1	2	1	2	2	1	2	2	2	1	2	1
(Serbia) Partizan NIS	6	4	1	1	1	1	1	1	2	2	2	2	4	2	2	1	2	1	1	2	1	1	1	2	1	2
(Montenegro) Budućnost VOLI	5	6	6	3	3	3	3	3	4	4	4	4	2	3	3	3	3	3	3	3	3	3	4	4	4	3
(Slovenia) Cedevita Olimpija	3	2	3	6	8	5	5	5	5	5	5	5	5	4	4	4	4	4	4	4	4	4	3	3	3	4
(Bosnia and Herzegovina) Igokea m:tel	7	8	8	10	5	7	9	7	7	7	8	6	6	6	6	6	6	6	5	5	5	5	5	5	5	5
(Serbia) FMP Meridian	11	7	7	4	4	4	4	4	3	3	3	3	3	5	5	5	5	5	6	6	6	6	6	6	6	6
(Montenegro) SC Derby	13	9	11	11	7	9	7	8	9	10	9	9	9	10	11	10	9	11	10	8	7	7	7	7	7	7
(Croatia) Cibona	4	3	2	5	6	6	6	6	6	6	7	8	7	8	8	8	10	9	8	9	8	8	8	8	9	8
(Montenegro) Mornar Barsko zlato	10	12	13	12	13	14	13	14	12	11	11	10	8	7	7	7	8	8	9	10	10	11	10	9	10	9
(Serbia) Mega Mozzart	2	5	5	7	9	10	8	9	8	8	6	7	10	12	9	9	7	7	7	7	9	9	9	10	8	10
(Serbia) Borac Čačak	8	11	9	8	10	11	11	11	10	9	10	11	12	11	12	12	12	10	12	11	11	10	11	11	11	11
(Croatia) Zadar	9	13	12	13	12	12	12	13	14	13	13	12	11	9	10	11	11	12	11	12	12	12	12	12	12	12
(Croatia) Split	14	14	14	14	14	13	14	12	13	14	14	14	14	14	14	14	14	13	13	13	14	13	13	13	13	13
(Slovenia) Krka	12	10	10	9	11	8	10	10	11	12	12	13	13	13	13	13	13	14	14	14	13	14	14	14	14	14

Source: ABA League

=== Results ===
Home \ Away	BOR	BUD	COL	CIB	CZV	FMP	IGO	KRK	MEG	MOR	PAR	SCD	SPL	ZAD
Borac Čačak	—	76–82	76–85	59–62	54–66	77–80	61–88	77–69	80–68	91–78	68–86	89–80	59–64	79–73
Budućnost VOLI	97–73	—	93–91	90–65	76–80	82–72	81–68	110–64	86–69	85–69	72–80	78–70	75–66	84–69
Cedevita Olimpija	83–80	79–84	—	80–84	82–83	89–92	80–70	88–56	92–81	79–59	81–79	88–78	86–60	73–74
Cibona	89–74	73–80	79–82	—	74–78	66–69	77–82	90–52	89–84	65–82	61–79	90–75	84–65	80–73
Crvena zvezda mts	109–62	71–63	79–64	86–72	—	90–82	85–66	76–56	81–67	81–74	71–56	94–84	97–61	91–69
FMP Meridian	90–82	77–79	75–77	76–71	74–98	—	89–81	87–76	79–86	83–81	80–86	104–99	93–77	83–76
Igokea m:tel	91–89	79–82	83–101	82–72	75–68	73–61	—	108–81	79–63	70–57	68–70	83–67	85–67	79–67
Krka	90–97	72–84	83–90	52–87	70–71	60–93	59–72	—	62–79	89–80	63–79	87–70	87–84	80–66
Mega Mozzart	85–91	87–81	104–75	93–89	69–76	82–89	71–81	73–72	—	70–83	69–97	101–68	78–65	70–72
Mornar Barsko zlato	85–90	62–73	79–101	77–87	69–77	82–78	82–76	74–65	79–75	—	64–66	82–88	81–65	86–84
Partizan NIS	75–68	75–66	89–96	98–77	98–84	74–69	83–70	92–45	90–93	95–83	—	79–57	109–49	103–72
SC Derby	88–74	89–84	80–88	93–87	67–99	85–76	93–90	86–76	83–62	76–95	83–93	—	77–70	94–78
Split	66–80	61–72	79–83	77–76	62–66	85–90	89–77	87–77	81–80	76–67	59–69	94–101	—	80–92
Zadar	70–56	65–63	77–92	67–68	73–83	83–80	64–77	78–71	81–85	71–76	73–78	71–76	61–59	—

Source: ABA League
Legend: Blue = home team win; Red = away team win.
Matches with lighter background shading were decided after overtime.

=== Results by round ===
The table lists the results of teams in each round.

Win	Loss	Postponed

Team ╲ Round	1	2	3	4	5	6	7	8	9	10	11	12	13	14	15	16	17	18	19	20	21	22	23	24	25	26
(Serbia) Crvena zvezda mts	W	W	L	W	W	W	W	W	W	W	W	W	W	W	W	W	W	W	W	W	L	W	W	W	W	W
(Serbia) Partizan NIS	W	W	W	W	W	W	W	L	W	W	L	W	L	W	W	W	W	W	W	W	W	W	W	L	W	W
(Montenegro) Budućnost VOLI	W	L	W	W	W	W	L	W	L	W	W	W	W	W	L	W	W	W	W	W	L	L	L	W	W	W
(Slovenia) Cedevita Olimpija	W	W	L	L	L	W	W	W	L	L	W	W	W	W	W	W	L	L	W	W	W	W	W	W	W	L
(Bosnia and Herzegovina) Igokea m:tel	W	L	W	L	W	L	L	W	W	L	L	W	W	W	W	L	L	L	L	W	W	W	L	W	W	W
(Serbia) FMP Meridian	L	W	W	W	W	W	L	W	W	W	W	W	L	L	L	L	L	L	L	L	L	W	W	W	W	L
(Montenegro) SC Derby	L	W	L	W	W	L	W	L	L	L	W	L	L	W	W	L	W	L	W	L	W	L	W	L	L	W
(Serbia) Mega Mozzart	W	L	W	L	L	L	W	L	W	L	W	L	W	L	W	W	L	W	L	L	L	L	L	L	W	L
(Croatia) Cibona	W	W	W	L	L	L	W	W	L	L	L	L	L	L	L	W	L	W	W	W	W	L	L	L	L	W
(Montenegro) Mornar Barsko zlato	L	L	L	L	L	L	W	L	W	W	W	L	W	W	W	L	W	L	L	L	L	L	W	W	L	L
(Serbia) Borac Čačak	L	L	W	W	L	L	L	L	W	W	L	L	L	L	L	W	W	W	L	W	L	W	L	L	L	L
(Croatia) Zadar	L	L	L	L	W	L	L	L	L	W	L	W	W	L	L	L	W	L	W	L	W	L	L	L	L	W
(Croatia) Split	L	L	L	L	L	W	L	W	L	L	L	L	L	L	L	L	L	W	L	L	L	W	W	W	L	L
(Slovenia) Krka	L	W	L	W	L	W	L	L	L	L	L	L	L	L	L	L	L	L	L	L	W	L	L	L	L	L

Source: ABA League

== Playoffs ==
On 13 September 2021, the ABA League JTD decided that six highest-placed clubs from the Regular season will qualify for the Playoffs.

Preliminary Round
(Slovenia) Cedevita Olimpija	2
(Bosnia and Herzegovina) Igokea m:tel	0
(Montenegro) Budućnost VOLI	2
(Serbia) FMP Meridian	0

Semifinals
(Serbia) Crvena zvezda mts	2
(Slovenia) Cedevita Olimpija	1
(Serbia) Partizan NIS	2
(Montenegro) Budućnost VOLI	1

Finals
(Serbia) Crvena zvezda mts	3
(Serbia) Partizan NIS	2

2021–22 ABA League Champions
(Serbia)
Crvena zvezda mts
6th title

=== Preliminary round ===
Team 1	Series	Team 2	Game 1	Game 2	Game 3
Budućnost VOLI (Montenegro)	2–0	(Serbia) FMP Meridian	76−70	79−74	—
Cedevita Olimpija (Slovenia)	2–0	(Bosnia and Herzegovina) Igokea m:tel	93–79	74−69	—

=== Semifinals ===
Team 1	Series	Team 2	Game 1	Game 2	Game 3
Crvena zvezda mts (Serbia)	2–1	(Slovenia) Cedevita Olimpija	93−82	80–88 (OT)	88–78
Partizan NIS (Serbia)	2–1	(Montenegro) Budućnost VOLI	82−66	71−72	101–77

=== Finals ===
Team 1	Series	Team 2	Game 1	Game 2	Game 3	Game 4	Game 5
Crvena zvezda mts (Serbia)	3–2	(Serbia) Partizan NIS	90–76	85–81	67–70	84–112	80–77

== Relegation Playoffs ==
The 13th placed team of the First Division season and the runners-up of the Second Division season should play in the Qualifiers for a spot in the next First Division season. That team should have been Split.

However, because of the rule that no more than 5 teams from the same country could participate in ABA league, and since Serbian team Zlatibor is the champion of the ABA League Second Division, relegation playoffs will be played between them and the lowest ranked Serbian team in the ABA League First Division (Borac Čačak).

Qualified clubs
Leagues	Clubs
First Division	(Serbia) Borac Čačak
Second Division	(Serbia) Zlatibor

=== Results ===
Team 1	Series	Team 2	Game 1	Game 2	Game 3
Borac Čačak (Serbia)	2–0	(Serbia) Zlatibor	85–80	87−66	—

==== Game 1 ====
30 April 2022	Borac Čačak (Serbia)	85–80 (Series: 1−0)	(Serbia) Zlatibor	Čačak
17:00	Scoring by quarter: 27−14, 13−20, 24–19, 20−27
	Pts: Pecarski 23; Rebs: Pecarski, Novaković 7 Asts: Đoković 7 PIR: Pecarski 28	Boxscore	Pts: Nikolić 19; Rebs: Đuran 9 Asts: Protić 7 PIR: Nikolić 19	Arena: Borac Hall; Attendance: 2,000; Referees: Miloš Koljenšić, Tomislav Vovk, Bojan Kruljac

==== Game 2 ====
4 May 2022	Zlatibor (Serbia)	66–87 (Series: 0−2)	(Serbia) Borac Čačak	Čajetina
17:00	Scoring by quarter: 16−20, 20−22, 14−25, 16−20
	Pts: Tadić 22; Rebs: Kutlešić 8 Asts: three players 3 PIR: Tadić 24	Boxscore	Pts: Pecarski 16; Rebs: Pecarski 7 Asts: Sanadze, López 5 PIR: Sanadze, Čarapić 20	Arena: TRC Zlatibor Hall; Attendance: 1,100; Referees: Uroš Obrknežević, Josip Radojković, Ivan Stefanović

== Statistics ==
=== PIR ===
Pos	Player	Club	PIR
1	(Bosnia and Herzegovina) Kenan Kamenjaš	SC Derby	21.04
2	(United States) Bryce Jones	FMP Meridian	19.33
3	(Serbia) Dalibor Ilić	Igokea	18.08
4	(United States) Willie Reed	Budućnost	17.81
5	(United States) Justin Carter	Zadar	17.80

=== Points ===
Pos	Player	Club	PPG
1	(United States) Shannon Shorter	Split	17.00
2	(Montenegro) Vladimir Mihailović	Mornar-Barsko zlato	16.61
3	(United States) Bryce Jones	FMP Meridian	15.70
4	(Croatia) Rok Stipčević	Krka	14.88
5	(Bosnia and Herzegovina) Kenan Kamenjaš	SC Derby	14.27

=== Rebounds ===
Pos	Player	Club	RPG
5	(Bosnia and Herzegovina) Kenan Kamenjaš	SC Derby	8.42
3	(Serbia) Dalibor Ilić	Igokea	7.71
3	(United States) Trevor Thompson	Zadar	6.94
4	(United States) Willie Reed	Budućnost	6.56
5	(Slovenia) Alen Omić	Cedevita Olimpija	6.41

=== Assists ===
Pos	Player	Club	APG
1	(United States) Bryce Jones	FMP Meridian	6.67
2	(United States) Markel Starks	Igokea	5.64
3	(United States) Scoochie Smith	Mega Soccerbet	5.62
4	(Bosnia and Herzegovina) Nemanja Gordić	Mornar-Barsko zlato	4.94
5	(United States) James Robinson	Igokea	4.93

- Only players who played more than 66% of total league games are included
- Source: ABA League

== Awards ==
Pos.	Player	Team	Ref.
MVP
SF	(Serbia) Nikola Kalinić	(Serbia) Crvena zvezda mts	
Finals MVP
G	(Serbia) Ognjen Dobrić	(Serbia) Crvena zvezda mts	
Top Scorer
G	(United States) Shannon Shorter	(Croatia) Split	
Best Defensive Player
SF	(Serbia) Branko Lazić	(Serbia) Crvena zvezda mts	
Top Prospect
SF	(Serbia) Nikola Jović	(Serbia) Mega Mozzart	
Coach of the Season
HC	(Serbia) Željko Obradović	(Serbia) Partizan NIS	
The Ideal Starting Five
PG	(United States) Kevin Punter	(Serbia) Partizan NIS	
SG	(Slovenia) Jaka Blažič	(Slovenia) Cedevita Olimpija	
SF	(Serbia) Nikola Kalinić	(Serbia) Crvena zvezda mts	
PF	(United States) Zach LeDay	(Serbia) Partizan NIS	
C	(Bosnia and Herzegovina) Kenan Kamenjaš	(Montenegro) SC Derby	

== MVP List ==
=== MVP of the Round ===
Round	Player	Team	PIR
1	(Montenegro) Nikola Ivanović	(Serbia) Crvena zvezda mts	35
2	(United States) Nate Reuvers	(Croatia) Cibona	36
3	(Serbia) Sava Lešić	(Serbia) Borac Čačak	28
4	(United States) Kyle Vinales	(Montenegro) SC Derby	43
5	(Israel) Yam Madar	(Serbia) Partizan NIS	32
6	(Croatia) Darko Bajo	(Croatia) Split	41
7	(Croatia) Karlo Matković	(Serbia) Mega Mozzart	40
8	(Serbia) Danilo Tasić	(Serbia) FMP Meridian	37
9	(United States) Garrett Nevels	(Serbia) FMP Meridian (2)	34
10	(Serbia) Marko Pecarski	(Serbia) Borac Čačak (2)	35
11	(United States) Garrett Nevels (2)	(Serbia) FMP Meridian (3)	36
12	(United States) Justin Carter	(Croatia) Zadar	34
13	(Montenegro) Nikola Ivanović (2)	(Serbia) Crvena zvezda mts (2)	29
14	(Greece) Zach Auguste	(Slovenia) Cedevita Olimpija	31
15	(Bosnia and Herzegovina) Kenan Kamenjaš	(Montenegro) SC Derby (2)	28
16	(Serbia) Marko Pecarski (2)	(Serbia) Borac Čačak (3)	27
17	(United States) Trevor Thompson	(Croatia) Zadar (2)	31
18	(United States) Shannon Shorter	(Croatia) Split (2)	27
19	(Croatia) Martin Junaković	(Croatia) Zadar (3)	29
20	(Bosnia and Herzegovina) Amar Gegić	(Croatia) Cibona (2)	30
21	(United States) Erick Neal	(Montenegro) SC Derby (3)	37
22	(Slovenia) Alen Omić	(Slovenia) Cedevita Olimpija (2)	30
23	(Montenegro) Vladimir Mihailović	(Montenegro) Mornar Barsko zlato	50
24	(Montenegro) Vladimir Mihailović (2)	(Montenegro) Mornar Barsko zlato (2)	38
25	(United States) Zach LeDay	(Serbia) Partizan NIS (2)	34
26	(Serbia) Dalibor Ilić	(Bosnia and Herzegovina) Igokea m:tel	49
PR1	(United States) (Georgia (country)) Jacob Pullen	(Slovenia) Cedevita Olimpija (3)	22
PR2	(United States) (Montenegro) Justin Cobbs	(Montenegro) Budućnost VOLI	21
SF1	(Serbia) Luka Mitrović	(Serbia) Crvena zvezda mts (3)	28
SF2	(Slovenia) Edo Murić	(Slovenia) Cedevita Olimpija (4)	27
SF3	(United States) (Serbia) Kevin Punter	(Serbia) Partizan NIS (3)	31
F1	(Montenegro) Nikola Ivanović (3)	(Serbia) Crvena zvezda mts (4)	18
F2	(Serbia) Nikola Kalinić	(Serbia) Crvena zvezda mts (5)	29
F3	(United States) (Serbia) Kevin Punter (2)	(Serbia) Partizan NIS (4)	34
F4	(Serbia) Aleksa Avramović	(Serbia) Partizan NIS (5)	33
F5	(Serbia) Dejan Davidovac	(Serbia) Crvena zvezda mts (6)	20

Source: ABA League

=== MVP of the Month ===
Month	Player	Team	Ref.
2021
October	(United States) Bryce Jones	(Serbia) FMP Meridian	
November	(Serbia) Dalibor Ilić	(Bosnia and Herzegovina) Igokea m:tel	
December	(Montenegro) Justin Cobbs	(Montenegro) Budućnost VOLI	
2022
January	(United States) Willie Reed	(Montenegro) Budućnost VOLI	
February	(Bosnia and Herzegovina) Amar Gegić	(Croatia) Cibona	
March	(Slovenia) Jaka Blažič	(Slovenia) Cedevita Olimpija	

== Average home attendances ==
As of 24 May 2022

Pos	Team	Total	High	Low	Average	Change
1	(Serbia) Partizan NIS	86,585	8,944	2,713	5,093	n/a
2	(Serbia) Crvena zvezda mts	62,358	7,238	852	3,668	n/a
3	(Slovenia) Cedevita Olimpija	31,500	9,000	750	2,100	n/a
4	(Montenegro) Budućnost VOLI	20,662	5,000	1	1,377	n/a
5	(Serbia) Borac Čačak	16,000	2,000	500	1,142	n/a
6	(Serbia) FMP Meridian	14,093	2,332	200	1,006	n/a
7	(Croatia) Split	12,550	3,200	300	965	n/a
8	(Bosnia and Herzegovina) Igokea m:tel	11,470	2,500	350	819	n/a
9	(Croatia) Cibona	10,500	2,500	250	807	n/a
10	(Croatia) Zadar	9,101	1,500	1	700	n/a
11	(Montenegro) Mornar Barsko zlato	8,851	1,200	1	680	n/a
12	(Serbia) Mega Mozzart	6,406	1,500	70	492	n/a
13	(Slovenia) Krka	6,020	800	150	463	n/a
14	(Montenegro) SC Derby	3,895	1,150	1	324	n/a
15*	(Serbia) Zlatibor*	1,100	1,100	–	1,100	n/a
	League total	301,271	9,000	1	1,521	n/a

Source: AdmiralBet ABA League

== Clubs in European competitions ==
Competition	Team	Progress	Result
EuroLeague	(Serbia) Crvena zvezda mts	Regular season	11th (12–16)
EuroCup	(Slovenia) Cedevita Olimpija	Quarterfinals	Eliminated by (Turkey) Frutti Extra Bursaspor, 83–85
EuroCup	(Montenegro) Budućnost VOLI	Eightfinals	Eliminated by MoraBanc Andorra, 64–74
EuroCup	(Serbia) Partizan NIS	Eightfinals	Eliminated by (Turkey) Frutti Extra Bursaspor, 95–103
Champions League	(Bosnia and Herzegovina) Igokea	Play-ins	Eliminated by (Belgium) Filou Oostende, 1–2
Champions League	(Croatia) Split	Qualification Group A	Eliminated in semifinals by (Switzerland) Fribourg Olympic, 76–67
Champions League	(Montenegro) Mornar Barsko zlato	Qualification Group C	Eliminated in semifinals by (Estonia) Kalev/Cramo, 104–89; Transferred to FIBA Europe Cup
FIBA Europe Cup	(Montenegro) Mornar Barsko zlato	Regular season Group E	3rd (2–4)

== See also ==
- List of current ABA League First Division team rosters
- 2021–22 ABA League Second Division
- 2021–22 Junior ABA League
- 2021–22 WABA League

ABA teams

- 2021–22 KK Crvena zvezda season
- 2021–22 KK Partizan season

2020–21 domestic competitions

- 2021–22 Basketball Championship of Bosnia and Herzegovina
- (Croatia) 2021–22 HT Premijer liga
- (Montenegro) 2021–22 Prva A liga
- 2021–22 Basketball League of Serbia
- (Slovenia) 2021–22 Slovenian Basketball League
