= 2011–12 Basketball League of Serbia =

- League: Basketball League of Serbia
- Sport: Basketball
- Duration: October 9, 2011 – March 10, 2012
- TV partner: RTS

First League
- Season champions: Vojvodina Srbijagas
- Season MVP: (Serbia) Darko Balaban (Smederevo 1953)
- Top scorer: (Serbia) Branko Milisavljević (Mega Vizura)

Super League
- Season champions: Partizan
- Season MVP: (Serbia) Miloš Dimić (Radnički FMP)
- Top scorer: (Serbia) Miloš Dimić (Radnički FMP)

Playoff stage
- Finals champions: Partizan
- Runners-up: Crvena Zvezda Beograd
- Finals MVP: (United States) Omar Thomas (Crvena Zvezda Beograd)

Basketball League of Serbia seasons
- ← 2010–11 2012–13 →

The 2011–12 Basketball League of Serbia season is the 6th season of the Basketball League of Serbia, the highest professional basketball league in Serbia. It is also 68th national championship played by Serbian clubs inclusive of nation's previous incarnations as Yugoslavia and Serbia & Montenegro. The first half of the season consists of 14 teams and 182-game regular season (26 games for each of the 14 teams) began on Saturday, October 9, 2011, and will end on Sunday, March 12, 2012. The second half of the season consists of 4 teams from Adriatic League and the best 4 teams from first half of the season. The first half is called First League and second is called Super League.

== Teams for 2011–12 season ==
Location of teams in the 2011–12 Basketball League of Serbia

Team	City	Arena	Capacity	Head coach
BKK Radnički	Belgrade	SC Šumice	1.000	Dragan Nikolić
Borac	Čačak	Borac Sports Hall	2.000	Raško Bojić
Crvena Zvezda DIVA	Belgrade	Pionir Hall	8.150	Svetislav Pešić
Hemofarm STADA	Vršac	Millennium Center	4.400	Nebojša Bogavac
Mega Vizura	Belgrade	Vizura Sports Center	1.500	Vlada Vukoičić
Metalac	Valjevo	Valjevo Sports Hall	1.500	Milovan Stepandić
Napredak Rubin	Kruševac	Kruševac Sports Hall	2.500	Bratislav Knežević
OKK Beograd	Belgrade	SC Šumice	1.000	Marko Ičelić
Partizan mt:s	Belgrade	Pionir Hall	8.150	Vlada Jovanović
Proleter Naftagas	Zrenjanin	Medison Hall	3.000	Dragan Torbica
Radnički FMP	Belgrade	FMP Hall	2.500	Miloš Pejić
Radnički Kragujevac	Kragujevac	Hala Jezero	3.500	Miroslav Nikolić
Sloboda	Užice	Veliki Park Sports Hall	2.200	Miroslav Radošević
Sloga	Kraljevo	Kraljevo Sports Hall	1.500	Zoran Milovanović
Smederevo 1953	Smederevo	Sports Hall Smederevo	3.000	Zoran Todorović
Tamiš	Pančevo	Strelište Sports Hall	1.100	Bojan Jovičić
Vojvodina Srbijagas	Novi Sad	SPC Vojvodina	11.500	Siniša Matić
Železničar	Inđija	Sports Hall Inđija	0.600	Ivo Smiljanić

Teams from Adriatic League
Teams from Balkan International Basketball League

== First League ==
=== Standings ===
Pos	Team	P	W	L	F	A	D	Pts
1	Vojvodina Srbijagas	26	23	3	2272	1951	+321	49
2	BKK Radnički	26	19	7	2168	2065	+103	45
3	Radnički FMP	26	17	9	2065	1920	+145	43
4	Mega Vizura	26	17	9	2133	2070	+63	43
5	OKK Beograd	26	15	11	2018	1917	+101	41
6	Tamiš	26	15	11	1892	1878	+14	41
7	Smederevo 1953	26	14	12	2174	2179	−5	40
8	Sloga	26	13	13	2066	2133	−67	39
9	Borac	26	12	14	1898	1869	+29	38
10	Sloboda	26	11	15	1930	2041	−111	37
11	Metalac	26	10	16	1959	2045	−86	36
12	Napredak Rubin	26	8	18	1986	2088	−102	34
13	Železničar	26	6	20	2034	2148	−114	32
14	Proleter Naftagas	26	2	24	1924	2215	−291	28

P=Matches played, W=Matches won, L=Matches lost, F=Points for, A=Points against, D=Points difference, Pts=Points

Qualification for Super League
Relegation to B League

==== Schedule and results ====
1. round
Mega Vizura – Sloboda	85–74
Sloga – BKK Radnički	89–92
Borac – Tamiš	71–48
Metalac – Radnički FMP	87–83
Smederevo 1953 – Železničar	93–78
Proleter – Vojvodina	76–90
OKK Beograd – Napredak	90–66

2. round
Sloboda – Napredak	85–78
Vojvodina – OKK Beograd	73–69
Železničar – Proleter	70–73
Radnički FMP – Smederevo 1953	85–79
Tamiš – Metalac	85–80
BKK Radnički – Borac	70–65
Mega Vizura – Sloga	107–105

3. round
Sloga – Sloboda	106–79
Borac – Mega Vizura	79–75
Metalac – BKK Radnički	94–92
Smederevo 1953 – Tamiš	76–72
Proleter – Radnički FMP	81–85
OKK Beograd – Železničar	78–58
Napredak – Vojvodina	73–74

4. round
Sloboda – Vojvodina	78–87
Železničar – Napredak	93–77
Tamiš – Proleter	71–48
BKK Radnički – Smederevo 1953	102–86
Sloga – Borac	77–67
Mega Vizura – Metalac	85–79
Radnički FMP – OKK Beograd	90–77

5. round
Borac – Sloboda	80–55
Metalac – Sloga	79–84
Smederevo 1953 – Mega Vizura	88–81
Proleter – BKK Radnički	87–93
OKK Beograd – Tamiš	83–69
Napredak – Radnički FMP	64–73
Vojvodina – Železničar	101–74

6. round
Sloboda – Železničar	82–96
Radnički FMP – Vojvodina	72–77
Tamiš – Napredak	83–60
BKK Radnički – OKK Beograd	79–85
Mega Vizura – Proleter	89–84
Sloga – Smederevo 1953	84–72
Borac – Metalac	81–67

7. round
Metalac – Sloboda	57–58
Smederevo 1953 – Borac	85–78
Proleter – Sloga	86–88
OKK Beograd – Mega Vizura	76–83
Napredak – BKK Radnički	73–80
Vojvodina – Tamiš	84–70
Železničar – Radnički FMP	57–79

8. round
Sloboda – Radnički FMP	69–73
Tamiš – Železničar	77–70
BKK Radnički – Vojvodina	76–76
Mega Vizura – Napredak	79–72
Sloga – OKK Beograd	88–76
Borac – Proleter	81–64
Metalac – Smederevo 1953	81–74

9. round
Smederevo 1953 – Sloboda	91–85
Proleter – Metalac	82–66
OKK Beograd – Borac	67–72
Napredak – Sloga	95–93
Vojvodina – Mega Vizura	97–77
Železničar – BKK Radnički	115–116
Radnički FMP – Tamiš	78–82

10. round
Sloboda – Tamiš	70–71
BKK Radnički – Radnički FMP	81–66
Mega Vizura – Železničar	85–78
Sloga – Vojvodina	84–76
Borac – Napredak	92–80
Metalac – OKK Beograd	78–81
Smederevo 1953 – Proleter	97–79

11. round
Proleter – Sloboda	76–85
OKK Beograd – Smederevo 1953	73–83
Napredak – Metalac	74–76
Vojvodina – Borac	92–84
Železničar – Sloga	95–100
Radnički FMP – Mega Vizura	77–79
Tamiš – BKK Radnički	72–52

12. round
Sloboda – BKK Radnički	70–68
Mega Vizura – Tamiš	91–74
Sloga – Radnički FMP	85–79
Borac – Železničar	80–64
Metalac – Vojvodina	63–72
Smederevo 1953 – Napredak	114–104
Proleter – OKK Beograd	65–88

13. round
OKK Beograd – Sloboda	86–70
Napredak – Proleter	81–69
Vojvodina – Smederevo 1953	93–67
Železničar – Metalac	78–57
Radnički FMP – Borac	84–71
Tamiš – Sloga	90–62
BKK Radnički – Mega Vizura	75–69

14. round
Sloboda – Mega Vizura	90–86
BKK Radnički – Sloga	88–78
Tamiš – Borac	80–72
Radnički FMP – Metalac	83–63
Železničar – Smederevo 1953	104–105
Vojvodina – Proleter	109–83
Napredak – OKK Beograd	68–76

15. round
Napredak – Sloboda	72–68
OKK Beograd – Vojvodina	80–84
Proleter – Železničar	68–81
Smederevo 1953 – Radnički FMP	82–88
Metalac – Tamiš	75–67
Borac -BKK Radnički	61–59
Sloga – Mega Vizura	67–87

16. round
Sloboda – Sloga	80–70
Mega Vizura – Borac	68–57
BKK Radnički – Metalac	98–84
Tamiš – Smederevo 1953	74–82
Radnički FMP – Proleter	92–71
Železničar – OKK Beograd	72–74
Vojvodina – Napredak	84–85

17. round
Vojvodina – Sloboda	100–71
Napredak – Železničar	75–66
OKK Beograd – Radnički FMP	77–73
Proleter – Tamiš	72–77
Smederevo 1953 – BKK Radnički	89–96
Metalac – Mega Vizura	97–88
Borac -Sloga	95–75

18. round
Sloboda – Borac	74–66
Sloga – Metalac	80–56
Mega Vizura – Smederevo 1953	90–69
BKK Radnički – Proleter	88–77
Tamiš – OKK Beograd	67–62
Radnički FMP – Napredak	82–70
Železničar – Vojvodina	76–87

19. round
Železničar – Sloboda	71–76
Vojvodina – Radnički FMP	96–80
Napredak – Tamiš	73–75
OKK Beograd – BKK Radnički	68–69
Proleter – Mega Vizura	75–101
Smederevo 1953 – Sloga	84–61
Metalac – Borac	77–65

20. round
Sloboda – Metalac	86–81
Borac – Smederevo 1953	68–56
Sloga – Proleter	107–75
Mega Vizura – OKK Beograd	76–70
BKK Radnički – Napredak	85–79
Tamiš – Vojvodina	63–70
Radnički FMP – Železničar	87–76

21. round
Radnički FMP – Sloboda	75–68
Železničar – Tamiš	94–67
Vojvodina – BKK Radnički	100–90
Napredak – Mega Vizura	77–79
OKK Beograd – Sloga	79–69
Proleter – Borac	73–74
Smederevo 1953 – Metalac	74–70

22. round
Sloboda – Smederevo 1953	81–75
Metalac – Proleter	78–67
Borac – OKK Beograd	59–80
Sloga – Napredak	67–81
Mega Vizura – Vojvodina	59–89
BKK Radnički – Železničar	97–79
Tamiš – Radnički FMP	72–70

23. round
Tamiš – Sloboda	69–66
Radnički FMP – BKK Radnički	79–73
Železničar – Mega Vizura	83–93
Vojvodina – Sloga	100–56
Napredak – Borac	67–60
OKK Beograd – Metalac	72–70
Proleter – Smederevo 1953	79–95

24. round
Sloboda – Proleter	72–68
Smederevo 1953 – OKK Beograd	85–97
Metalac – Napredak	92–85
Borac – Vojvodina	78–80
Sloga – Železničar	67–58
Mega Vizura – Radnički FMP	67–76
BKK Radnički – Tamiš	76–67

25. round
BKK Radnički – Sloboda	81–73
Tamiš – Mega Vizura	83–67
Radnički FMP – Sloga	87–50
Železničar – Borac	83–75
Vojvodina – Metalac	86–74
Napredak – Smederevo 1953	81–83
OKK Beograd – Proleter	81–76

26. round
Sloboda – OKK Beograd	75–73
Proleter – Napredak	70–76
Smederevo 1953 – Vojvodina	90–95
Metalac – Železničar	79–65
Borac – Radnički FMP	67–69
Sloga – Tamiš	74–70
Mega Vizura – BKK Radnički	87–89

== Super League ==
=== Standings ===
Pos	Team	Total						
		P	W	L	F	A	D	Pts
1	Partizan mt:s	14	12	2	1196	976	+220	26
2	Radnički Kragujevac	14	10	4	1170	1134	+36	24
3	Crvena Zvezda DIVA	14	9	5	1137	1050	+87	23
4	Vojvodina Srbijagas	14	7	7	1158	1148	+10	21
5	Radnički FMP	14	5	9	1076	1154	–78	19
6	Mega Vizura	14	5	9	1185	1242	–57	19
7	BKK Radnički	14	4	10	1111	1197	–86	18
8	Hemofarm STADA	14	4	10	1103	1235	–132	18

P=Matches played, W=Matches won, L=Matches lost, F=Points for, A=Points against, D=Points difference, Pts=Points

Qualification for Adriatic league

As of 23 May 2012

=== Schedule and results ===
1. round
Crvena Zvezda – Hemofarm	73–60
Vojvodina – Radnički Kragujevac	86–88
BKK Radnički – Radnički FMP	73–78
Mega Vizura – Partizan	71–87

2. round
Hemofarm – Partizan	70–95
Radnički FMP – Mega Vizura	90–73
Radnički Kragujevac – BKK Radnički	70–81
Crvena Zvezda – Vojvodina	91–77

3. round
Vojvodina – Hemofarm	85–60
BKK Radnički – Crvena Zvezda	81–80
Mega Vizura – Radnički Kragujevac	94–97
Partizan – Radnički FMP	90–70

4. round
Hemofarm – Radnički FMP	84–82
Radnički Kragujevac – Partizan	79–77
Crvena Zvezda – Mega Vizura	92–91
Vojvodina – BKK Radnički	103–73

5. round
BKK Radnički – Hemofarm	91–64
Mega Vizura – Vojvodina	75–80
Partizan – Crvena Zvezda	76–69
Radnički FMP – Radnički Kragujevac	89–82

6. round
Hemofarm – Radnički Kragujevac	80–91
Crvena Zvezda – Radnički FMP	89–65
Vojvodina – Partizan	95–85
BKK Radnički – Mega Vizura	83–90

7. round
Mega Vizura – Hemofarm	109–105
Partizan – BKK Radnički	86–63
Radnički FMP – Vojvodina	94–73
Radnički Kragujevac – Crvena Zvezda	80–68

8. round
Hemofarm – Crvena Zvezda	68–76
Radnički Kragujevac – Vojvodina	76–64
Radnički FMP – BKK Radnički	99–82
Partizan – Mega Vizura	92–60

9. round
Partizan – Hemofarm	83–48
Mega Vizura – Radnički FMP	86–70
BKK Radnički – Radnički Kragujevac	76–88
Vojvodina – Crvena Zvezda	87–83

10. round
Hemofarm – Vojvodina	95–100
Crvena Zvezda – BKK Radnički	85–71
Radnički Kragujevac – Mega Vizura	99–92
Radnički FMP – Partizan	66–82

11. round
Radnički FMP – Hemofarm	72–85
Partizan – Radnički Kragujevac	82–76
Mega Vizura – Crvena Zvezda	75–79
BKK Radnički – Vojvodina	81–80

12. round
Hemofarm – BKK Radnički	95–94
Vojvodina – Mega Vizura	83–85
Crvena Zvezda – Partizan	78–83
Radnički Kragujevac – Radnički FMP	77–69

13. round
Radnički Kragujevac – Hemofarm	92–89
Radnički FMP – Crvena Zvezda	61–87
Partizan – Vojvodina	91–54
Mega Vizura – BKK Radnički	92–85

14. round
Hemofarm – Mega Vizura	100–92
BKK Radnički – Partizan	77–87
Vojvodina – Radnički FMP	91–71
Crvena Zvezda – Radnički Kragujevac	87–75

== Playoff stage ==
=== Semifinals ===
Game 1

27 May 2012
19:00

Report

Partizan mt:s	77–67	Vojvodina Srbijagas
Scoring by quarter: 18–13, 26–14, 18–18, 15–22
Pts: Anđušić 12; Rebs: Raduljica, Mačvan 8 Asts: Raduljica, Anđušić 4		Pts: Milošević 13; Rebs: Stojačić 6 Asts: Marković 3
Partizan leads 1–0

Pionir Hall
Belgrade, Serbia
Attendance: 4,000
Referees: Jovcic Milivoje, Mrdak Branislav, Glisic Aleksandar

27 May 2012
19:00

Report

Radnički Kragujevac	84–78	Crvena zvezda DIVA
Scoring by quarter: 32–18, 21–24, 17–18, 14–18
Pts: Simon 24; Rebs: Scott 9 Asts: Marković 6		Pts: P. Popović 15; Rebs: P. Popović 7 Asts: Radivojević 3
Radnički leads 1–0

Hala Jezero
Kragujevac, Serbia
Attendance: 3,500
Referees: Neskovic Dragan, Jevtovic Vladimir, Vorkapic Branko

Game 2

29 May 2012
20:00

Report

Vojvodina Srbijagas	81–87	Partizan mt:s
Scoring by quarter: 25–20, 19–17, 17–20, 20–30
Pts: Dunđerski, Marković 14; Rebs: Three players 3 Asts: Dunđerski 5		Pts: Mačvan 17; Rebs: Milosavljević 7 Asts: Mačvan 4
Partizan won 2–0

Spens Sports Center
Novi Sad, Serbia
Attendance: 1,400
Referees: Neskovic Dragan, Jevtovic Vladimir, Pecelj Marko

29 May 2012
18:00

Report

Crvena zvezda DIVA	76–62	Radnički Kragujevac
Scoring by quarter: 19–10, 20–14, 17–22, 20–16
Pts: Thomas 23; Rebs: Lešić 10; Asts: Thomas 5		Pts: Bakić, Mijatović 9 Rebs: Scott 8 Asts: Pavković 5
Series tied at 1–1

Pionir Hall
Belgrade, Serbia
Attendance: 6,000
Referees: Juras Marko, Maricic Sasa, Glisic Aleksandar

Game 3

1 June 2012
18:00

Report

Radnički Kragujevac	71–76	Crvena zvezda DIVA
Scoring by quarter: 17–15, 20–14, 15–27, 19–20
Pts: Bakić 15; Rebs: Bakić 6 Asts: Four players 3		Pts: Thomas 19; Rebs: Thomas 14; Asts: B. Popović 4
Crvena Zvezda won 2–1

Hala Jezero
Kragujevac, Serbia
Attendance: 4,000
Referees: Belosevic Ilija, Stefanovic Ivan, Juras Jasmina

=== Final ===
Game 1

5 June 2012
20:00

Report

Partizan mt:s	92–83	Crvena zvezda DIVA
Scoring by quarter: 23–14, 22–21, 19–28, 28–20
Pts: Milosavljević 18; Rebs: Mačvan 9 Asts: James, Mačvan 5		Pts: Thomas 21; Rebs: Ilić 10; Asts: B. Popović, Thomas 3
Partizan leads 1–0

Pionir Hall
Belgrade, Serbia
Attendance: 6,000
Referees: Vojinovic Milija, Neskovic Dragan, Jevtovic Vladimir

Game 2

8 June 2012
20:00

Report

Crvena zvezda DIVA	68–56	Partizan mt:s
Scoring by quarter: 21–15, 21–13, 14–20, 12–8
Pts: Thomas 18; Rebs: Ilić 8 Asts: Radivojević, Thomas 2		Pts: Raduljica 17; Rebs: Raduljica 7 Asts: Mačvan 3
Series tied 1–1

Pionir Hall
Belgrade, Serbia
Attendance: 6,000
Referees: Jovcic Milivoje, Obrknezevic Uros, Mrdak Branislav

Game 3

12 June 2012
20:00

Report

Partizan mt:s	78–72	Crvena zvezda DIVA
Scoring by quarter: 18–16, 29–21, 15–11, 16–24
Pts: Lučić 19; Rebs: Lučić 6 Asts: Lučić 4		Pts: B. Popović 14; Rebs: Ilić, Subotić 5 Asts: Čović 3
Partizan leads 2–1

Pionir Hall
Belgrade, Serbia
Attendance: 7,000
Referees: Belosevic Ilija, Juras Marko, Maricic Sasa

Game 4

15 June 2012
20:00

Report

Crvena zvezda DIVA	82–86	Partizan mt:s
Scoring by quarter: 21–28, 21–20, 18–17, 22–21
Pts: Thomas 23; Rebs: Lešić 5 Asts: B. Popović 6		Pts: Mačvan 19; Rebs: Mačvan 8 Asts: James 7
Partizan won 3–1

FMP Hall
Belgrade, Serbia
Attendance: 3,000
Referees: Vojinovic Milija, Neskovic Dragan, Jevtovic Vladimir

=== Bracket ===
Semifinals
1	Partizan mt:s	2
4	Vojvodina Srbijagas	0
2	Radnički Kragujevac	1
3	Crvena zvezda DIVA	2

Final
1	Partizan mt:s	3
3	Crvena Zvezda DIVA	1

2011–12 Basketball League of Serbia Champions

Partizan
19th Title

== Stats leaders ==
=== MVP Round by Round ===
First League

Round	Player	Team	Efficiency
1	(Serbia) Marko Boltić	BKK Radnički	40
2	(Serbia) Branko Milisavljević	Mega Vizura	32
3	(Serbia) Ivan Žigeranović	Borac Čačak	44
4	(Serbia) Darko Balaban	Smederevo 1953	37
5	(Serbia) Ivan Žigeranović (2)	Borac Čačak	40
6	(Serbia) Slobodan Božović	Sloga Kraljevo	43
7	(Serbia) Darko Balaban (2)	Smederevo 1953	33
8	(Serbia) Ivan Žigeranović (3)	Borac Čačak	47
9	(Serbia) Zoran Osmokrović	BKK Radnički	40
10	(Serbia) Marko Zočević	Borac Čačak	37
11	(Serbia) Marko Popović	Sloga Kraljevo	44
12	(Serbia) Vojin Svilar	Smederevo 1953	39
13	(Serbia) Marko Boltić (2)	BKK Radnički	41
14	(Serbia) Miloš Bojović	Železničar	39
14	(Serbia) Branko Milisavljević (2)	Mega Vizura	39
15	(Montenegro) Bojan Bakić	Metalac Valjevo	41
16	(Serbia) Darko Balaban (3)	Smederevo 1953	43
17	(Montenegro) Bojan Bakić (2)	Metalac Valjevo	36
18	(Serbia) Nenad Miljenović	Mega Vizura	36
19	(United States) James Thomas Tyler	Sloga Kraljevo	38
20	(Serbia) Đorđe Tresač	Sloga Kraljevo	50
21	(Serbia) Miloš Bojović (2)	Železničar	38
22	(Serbia) Aleksandar Petrović	BKK Radnički	36
23	(Montenegro) Bojan Bakić (3)	Metalac Valjevo	36
24	(Montenegro) Bojan Bakić (4)	Metalac Valjevo	35
25	(Serbia) Slaven Čupković	Napredak Kruševac	40
26	(Serbia) Nenad Miljenović (2)	Mega Vizura	32

Super League

Round	Player	Team	Efficiency
1	(Serbia) Miloš Dimić	Radnički FMP	35
2	(Serbia) Miroslav Raduljica	Partizan mt:s	28
3	(United States) Mike Scott	Radnički Kragujevac	39
4	(Serbia) Nemanja Jaramaz	Mega Vizura	35
5	(Serbia) Aleksandar Petrović	BKK Radnički	35
6	(Turkey) Duşan Çantekin	Mega Vizura	38
7	(Serbia) Đorđe Gagić	Hemofarm	39
8	(Serbia) Miloš Dimić (2)	Radnički FMP	37
9	(Serbia) Aleksandar Petrović (2)	BKK Radnički	29
10	(Serbia) Milan Mačvan	Partizan mt:s	27
10	(Serbia) Miljan Pavković	Radnički Kragujevac	27
10	(United States) David Simon	Radnički Kragujevac	27
11	(Serbia) Luka Mitrović	Hemofarm	41
12	(Serbia) Miloš Dimić (2)	Radnički FMP	42
13	(Serbia) Miroslav Raduljica (2)	Partizan mt:s	32
14	(Serbia) Luka Mitrović (2)	Hemofarm	32

Play off

Round	Player	Team	Efficiency
1	(United States) David Simon	Radnički Kragujevac	24
2	(United States) Omar Thomas	Crvena Zvezda DIVA	33
3	(United States) Omar Thomas (2)	Crvena Zvezda DIVA	21
4	(United States) Omar Thomas (3)	Crvena Zvezda DIVA	26
5	(United States) Omar Thomas (4)	Crvena Zvezda DIVA	21
6	(Serbia) Vladimir Lučić	Partizan mt:s	25
7	(Serbia) Milan Mačvan	Partizan mt:s	24
7	(United States) Omar Thomas (5)	Crvena Zvezda DIVA	24
