= 2014–15 KK Vojvodina Srbijagas season =

KK Vojvodina Srbijagas
2014–15 season
- Head coach: Dusan Alimpijievic
- Arena: SPC Vojvodina
- Basketball League of Serbia: 3rd
- Basketball League of Serbia: 5th
- Radivoj Korać Cup: Quarter-final
Home	Away

In 2014–15 season the club competed in both parts of Basketball League of Serbia and Radivoj Korać Cup.

== Basketball league of Serbia ==
The club began the season without any high ambitions and they surprised many people after winning the first 10 games, before losing to OKK Beograd in the 11th round. During the season two leading players Stefan Pot and Božo Đumić left the club. They still managed to bring in the young and talent Jovan Novak who quickly became one of the best players in the league. Vojvodina finished the season with 17 victories and 5 loses on the 3rd place.

== Serbian Superleague ==
In the second part of the season Vojvodina continued to go strong and won 3 games in a row following the 1st round loss against Metalac Valjevo, before losing to Partizan at home. They finished the season in the 5th place with the score 6–8.

== Players ==
KK Vojvodina Srbijagas roster
Players
Coaches

Pos.	No.	Nat.	Name	Ht.	Wt.	Age
PF	4	(Serbia)	Jovišić, Nebojša	2.00 m (6 ft 7 in)		38 – 29 April 1988
PG	5	(Serbia)	Novak, Jovan	1.88 m (6 ft 2 in)		31 – 8 November 1994
SG	6	(Serbia)	Vrbaški, Stevan	1.96 m (6 ft 5 in)
PF	7	(Serbia)	Čampara, Ljubomir	2.03 m (6 ft 8 in)		32 – 29 August 1993
SG	8	(Serbia)	Popović, Svetozar	1.95 m (6 ft 5 in)		39 – 16 April 1987
SF	10	(Serbia)	Matić, Stefan	2.00 m (6 ft 7 in)		35 – 5 April 1991
C	11	(Serbia)	Šešlija, Radoš	2.08 m (6 ft 10 in)		34 – 4 February 1992
PF	12	(Serbia)	Bursać, Aleksandar	2.07 m (6 ft 9 in)		31 – 19 March 1995
SF	13	(Serbia)	Branković, Marko	2.00 m (6 ft 7 in)
SG	15	(Serbia)	Radonjić, Marko	1.91 m (6 ft 3 in)		33 – 6 February 1993
SG	20	(Serbia)	Jeremić, Marko	1.91 m (6 ft 3 in)		34 – 23 November 1991
SF	45	(Serbia)	Grubor, Miloš	2.01 m (6 ft 7 in)		35 – 13 January 1991
PF	-	(Serbia)	Radenović, Miloš	1.98 m (6 ft 6 in)		30 – 7 May 1996
	-	(Serbia)	Cvjetan, Đorđe

Head coach

- (Serbia) Dušan Almipijević

Legend

- (C) Team captain
- Injured

=== Depth chart ===
Pos.	Starting 5	Bench 1	Bench 2	Bench 3
C	Radoš Šešlija	Ljubomir Čampara
PF	Nebojša Jovišić	Aleksandar Bursać		Marko Radenović
SF	Stefan Matić	Miloš Grubor	Marko Branković
SG	Marko Jeremić	Marko Radonjić	Stevan Vrbaški	Đorđe Cvjetan
PG	Jovan Novak	Svetozar Popović

=== Left club during the season ===
Stefan Pot (to CSU Asesoft Ploiești)

Božo Đumić (to KK Partizan)

=== Joined club during the season ===
Jovan Novak (Free Agent)

Marko Radonjić (from Napredak Kruševac)

== Statistics ==
Legend
GP	Games played	GS	Games started	MPG	Minutes per game
FG%	Field-goal percentage	3FG%	3-point field-goal percentage	FT%	Free-throw percentage
RPG	Rebounds per game	APG	Assists per game	SPG	Steals per game
BPG	Blocks per game	PPG	Points per game	PIR	PIR per game

=== Basketball league of Serbia ===
Player	GP	MPG	FG%	3FG%	FT%	RPG	APG	SPG	BPG	PPG
Marko Branković	11	12.3	50%	25%	50%	1.0	0.5	0.5	0.0	2.6
Aleksandar Bursać										
Ljubomir Čampara										
Đorđe Cvjetan										
Božo Đumić										
Milos Grubor										
Marko Jeremić										
Nebojša Jovišić										
Stefan Matić										
Jovan Novak										
Svetozar Popović										
Stefan Pot										
Miloš Radenović										
Radoš Šešlija										
Stevan Vrbaški										
