= KK Meridiana =

Defunct basketball club in Novi Sad, Serbia

- Founded: February 16, 2010; 15 years ago
- Folded: 2015; 10 years ago
- History: KK Meridiana; 2010–2015
- Arena: Futog Sports Hall
- Capacity: 2,100
- Location: Novi Sad, Serbia
- Team colors: Green, White
- Website: sportskiklubmeridiana.net

Košarkaški klub Meridiana (Serbian Cyrillic: Кошаркашки клуб Меридиана), was a men's professional basketball club based in Novi Sad, Serbia. The club is used to compete in the Basketball League of Serbia.

== History ==
The club was founded on February 16, 2010, as part of the sports club of the same name. Only three years after its foundation, they made their Basketball League of Serbia debut during the 2013–14 season.

== Coaches ==
- (Serbia) Ljubomir Poček (2010)
- (Serbia) Zoran Stojačić (2010–2011)
- (Serbia) Mile Medaković (2011–2012)
- (Serbia) Filip Socek (2012–2014)

== Season by season ==
Season	Tier	Division	Pos.	W–L	League Cup
2010–11	3	1st Regional League (North)	2	21–5	—
2011–12	3	1st Regional League (North)	1	24–2	Semifinals
2012–13	2	Second League	1	21–5	—
2013–14	1	BLS First League	13	6–20	—
2014–15	2	Second League	12	6–20	—

== Trophies and awards ==
=== Trophies ===
- Second League of Serbia (2nd-tier)
  - Winner (1): 2012–13
