= Uroš Čarapić =

Serbian basketball player

No. 44 – Borac Čačak
- Position: Shooting guard
- League: Basketball League of Serbia; Adriatic League

Personal information
- Born: 24 September 1996 (age 30) Čačak, Serbia, Yugoslavia
- Listed height: 1.95 m (6 ft 5 in)
- Listed weight: 91 kg (201 lb)

Career information
- NBA draft: 2018: undrafted
- Playing career: 2013–present

Career history
- 2013–present: Borac Čačak

Career highlights
- Serbian League Cup winner (2014)
Medals
Men's basketball
Representing Serbia
U18 European Championship
Silver medal – second place	2014 Turkey	U18 Team

Uroš Čarapić (Serbian Cyrillic: Урош Чарапић; born 24 September 1996) is a Serbian professional basketball player for Borac Čačak of the Basketball League of Serbia and the ABA League. Standing at 1.95 m (6 ft 5 in), he plays shooting guard positions.

== Professional career ==
Čarapić grew up with a youth system of his hometown club Borac. In the 2013–14 season, he made his Serbian League debut. In the 2019–20 season, Borac named him their new team captain. In May 2020, he signed a three-year contract extension.

== National team career ==
In July/August 2021, Čarapić was a member of the Serbia U-18 that won a silver medal at the FIBA Europe Under-18 Championship in Konya, Turkey. Over six tournament games, he averaged one point and one rebound per game.
