= 2011–12 Basketball Cup of Serbia =

2011–12 Cup of Serbia
- Season: 2011–12
- Games played: 15
- Teams: 16

Finals
- Champions: Radnički FMP
- Runners-up: Metalac

The 2011–12 Basketball Cup of Serbia is the 6th season of the Serbian 2nd-tier men's cup tournament.

Belgrade-based team Radnički FMP won the Cup.

== Bracket ==
First round
Crnokosa | 82
Smederevo 1953 | 78
Novi Pazar | 66
Železničar Inđija | 98
Konstantin | 63
Radnički FMP | 68
Surčin | 65
Vojvodina Srbijagas | 94
Meridiana | 76
Mega Vizura | 70
Spartak | 98
Borac (OT) | 101
Jedinstvo Novi Bečej | 42
Metalac | 80

Quarterfinals
Crnokosa | 87
Železničar Inđija | 69
Radnički FMP | 99
Vojvodina Srbijagas | 78
Meridiana | 95
Borac | 85
Jablanica | 53
Metalac | 70

Semifinals
Crnokosa | 85
Radnički FMP | 91
Meridiana | 81
Metalac | 88

Final
20 December 2011; Belgrade
Radnički FMP (OT) | 82
Metalac | 77

Source: Basketball Federation of Serbia

Qualifications

1. Qualification game: Radnički Obranovac 96–99 (OT) Konstantin

== See also ==
- 2011–12 Radivoj Korać Cup
- 2011–12 Basketball League of Serbia
