= 2018–19 Basketball Cup of Serbia =

2018–19 Cup of Serbia
- Season: 2018–19
- Duration: December 11, 2018 – January 16, 2019
- Games played: 7
- Teams: 8

Finals
- Champions: Novi Pazar
- Runners-up: Sveti Đorđe
- Semifinalists: Vojvodina; Zemun Fitofarmacija

The 2018–19 Basketball Cup of Serbia is the 13th season of the Serbian 2nd-tier men's cup tournament.

The Cup Finalists, Novi Pazar and Sveti Đorđe, are qualified for the 2019 National Cup tournament held in Niš in February.

== Bracket ==
Quarterfinals
December 11, 2018
Sveti Đorđe	79
Zdravlje	75
December 11, 2018
Mladost SP	84
Vojvodina	97
December 11, 2018
Kolubara LA 2003	83
Novi Pazar	94
December 18, 2018
Zemun Fitofarmacija	90
Konstantin	85

Semifinals
December 26, 2018
Sveti Đorđe	98
Vojvodina	82
December 25, 2018
Novi Pazar	92
Zemun Fitofarmacija	87

Final
January 16, 2019
Sveti Đorđe	79
Novi Pazar	89

Source: KUP KSS DRUGI STEPEN

== Quarterfinals ==
=== Mladost SP v Vojvodina ===
December 11, 2018
19:00

Boxscore

Mladost SP	84–97	Vojvodina
Scoring by quarter: 29–23, 19–30, 23–21, 13–23
Pts: Beader 17; Rebs: three players 9 Asts: Đonlić, Kužeta 4		Pts: Atanasov, Kovačević 19; Rebs: Prica 10; Asts: Berbakov 4

Vuk Karadžić ES Hall, Smederevska Palanka
Attendance: 300
Referees: Marko Strika, Nikola Miloradović, Stefan Ćalić

=== Sveti Đorđe v Zdravlje ===
December 11, 2018
20:30

Boxscore

Sveti Đorđe	79–75	Zdravlje
Scoring by quarter: 21–21, 17–19, 15–12, 26–23
Pts: Tomić 22; Rebs: Ostojić 6 Asts: Ostojić 7		Pts: Andrejević 14; Rebs: Stojiljković, Jovanović 7 Asts: Čvorović 5

Sveti Sava ES Hall, Žitište
Attendance: 300
Referees: Nemanja Vlahović, Bogdan Mali, Nemanja Radović

=== Kolubara LA 2003 v Novi Pazar ===
December 11, 2018
19:00

Boxscore

Kolubara LA 2003	83–94	Novi Pazar
Scoring by quarter: 13–26, 19–30, 31–18, 20–20
Pts: Vesković 18; Rebs: Rnić 7 Asts: Simić, Šparović 5		Pts: Ivanović 26; Rebs: Krstić, Vujović 9 Asts: Nešović 6

SRC Kolubara, Lazarevac
Attendance: 400
Referees: Radoš Arsenijević, Petar Pešić, Uroš Dojčinović

=== Zemun Fitofarmacija v Konstantin ===
December 18, 2018
15:00

Boxscore

Zemun Fitofarmacija	90–85	Konstantin
Scoring by quarter: 27–20, 16–16, 23–25, 24–24
Pts: Vukojičić 20; Rebs: Roknić 8 Asts: Nedeljković 6		Pts: Ilić 18; Rebs: Bjelak 5 Asts: Veličković 8

Pinki Hall, Belgrade
Attendance: 300
Referees: Dragan Matić, Strahinja Dašić, Nikola Radosavljević

== Semifinals ==
=== Zemun Fitofarmacija v Novi Pazar ===
December 25, 2018
15:00

Boxscore

Zemun Fitofarmacija	87–92	Novi Pazar
Scoring by quarter: 18–25, 25–27, 22–20, 22–20
Pts: Drašković 19; Rebs: Todorić 8 Asts: Todorić 15		Pts: Krstić 29; Rebs: Bulatović 8 Asts: Nešović 6

Pinki Hall, Belgrade
Attendance: 100
Referees: Nemanja Ninković, Siniša Prpa, Uroš Dojčinović

=== Sveti Đorđe v Vojvodina ===
December 26, 2018
19:30

Boxscore

Sveti Đorđe	98–82	Vojvodina
Scoring by quarter: 25–24, 25–19, 30–13, 18–26
Pts: Ostojić 25; Rebs: Tomić 8 Asts: Ostojić 11		Pts: Zarić 20; Rebs: Majstorović 10; Asts: Stojanović 7

Sveti Sava ES Hall, Žitište
Attendance: 300
Referees: Vladimir Vesković, Petar Pešić, Nikola Miloradović

== Final ==
January 16, 2019
18:30

Boxscore

Sveti Đorđe	79–89	Novi Pazar
Scoring by quarter: 18–22, 25–19, 19–29, 17–19
Pts: Tomić 21; Rebs: Vulin 9 Asts: Ostojić, Krstanović 6		Pts: Krstić 22; Rebs: Ivanović 8 Asts: Nešović, Radonjić 5

Sveti Sava ES Hall, Žitište
Attendance: 300
Referees: Vladimir Jevtović, Siniša Prpa, Nikola Miloradović

== See also ==
- 2018–19 Radivoj Korać Cup
- 2018–19 Basketball League of Serbia
