= 2013–14 Basketball League of Serbia =

- League: Basketball League of Serbia
- Sport: Basketball
- Duration: October 5, 2013 – March 29, 2014
- TV partner: RTS

First League
- Season champions: FMP
- Season MVP: (Serbia) Andrija Bojić (OKK Beograd)
- Top scorer: (Serbia) Ognjen Jaramaz (Smederevo)

Super League
- Season champions: Partizan NIS
- Season MVP: (Serbia) Boban Marjanović (Crvena Zvezda Telekom)
- Top scorer: (Serbia) Bogdan Bogdanović (Partizan NIS)

Playoff stage
- Finals champions: Partizan NIS
- Runners-up: Crvena Zvezda Telekom
- Finals MVP: (Serbia) Bogdan Bogdanović (Partizan NIS)

Basketball League of Serbia seasons
- ← 2012–13 2014–15 →

The 2013–14 Basketball League of Serbia season is the eighth season of the Basketball League of Serbia, the highest professional basketball league in Serbia. It is also 70th national championship played by Serbian clubs inclusive of nation's previous incarnations as Yugoslavia and Serbia & Montenegro.

The first half of the season consists of 14 teams and 182-game regular season (26 games for each of the 14 teams) began on Saturday, October 5, 2013 and will end on Sunday, March 29, 2014. The second half of the season consists of 4 teams from Adriatic League and the best 4 teams from first half of the season. The first half is called First League and second is called Super League.

== Teams for 2013–14 season ==
Location of teams in the 2012–13 Basketball League of Serbia

Team	City	Arena	Capacity	Head coach
Meridiana	Novi Sad	SC Futog	1.500	Filip Socek
Borac Mozzart Sport	Čačak	Hala kraj Morave	4.000	Raško Bojić
Crnokosa	Kosjerić	Kosjerić Sports Hall	1.000	Blagoje Ivić
Crvena Zvezda Telekom	Belgrade	Pionir Hall	8.150	Dejan Radonjić
Napredak Rubin	Kruševac	Kruševac Sports Hall	2.500	Boško Đokić
Konstantin	Niš	Čair Sports Center	5.000	Jovica Antonić
Mega Vizura	Belgrade	Sports Hall Smederevo	2.600	Dejan Milojević
Metalac Farmakom	Valjevo	Valjevo Sports Hall	1.500	Siniša Matić
OKK Beograd	Belgrade	SC Šumice	2.000	Milovan Stepandić
Partizan NIS	Belgrade	Pionir Hall	8.150	Duško Vujošević
FMP	Belgrade	Železnik Hall	3.000	Milan Gurović
Radnički Kragujevac	Kragujevac	Hala Jezero	5.320	Miroslav Nikolić
Sloboda	Užice	Veliki Park Sports Hall	2.200	
Sloga	Kraljevo	Kraljevo Sports Hall	1.500	Vladimir Đokić
Smederevo 1953	Smederevo	Sports Hall Smederevo	2.600	Zoran Todorović
Tamiš	Pančevo	Strelište Sports Hall	1.100	Darko Jovičić
Vojvodina Srbijagas	Novi Sad	SC Slana Bara	2.000	Dušan Alimpijević
Vršac	Vršac	Millennium Center	5.000	Oliver Popović

Teams from Adriatic League

== First League ==
=== Standings ===
	Team	Pld	W	L	PF	PA	Diff	Pts	Tie-Break
1	FMP	26	20	6	2115	1865	+250	46	
2	Crnokosa	26	18	8	2076	1932	+144	44	
3	Metalac Farmakom	26	17	9	2041	1877	+164	43	2:0 +17
4	Borac Mozzart Sport	26	17	9	1888	1854	+34	43	0:2 -17
5	Konstantin	26	15	11	1974	1903	+71	41	
6	OKK Beograd	26	14	12	2060	2059	+1	40	
7	Vršac	26	13	13	2130	2088	+42	39	
8	Vojvodina Srbijagas	26	12	14	1933	1901	+32	38	1:1 +3
9	Tamiš	26	12	14	1765	1826	-61	38	1:1 -3
10	Napredak Rubin	26	11	15	1794	1880	-86	37	2:2 +25
11	Sloga	26	11	15	1965	2028	-63	37	2:2 -8
12	Smederevo 1953	26	11	15	1976	2026	-50	37	2:2 -17
13	Meridiana	26	6	20	1951	2153	-202	32	
14	Sloboda	26	5	21	1876	2152	-276	31	

Qualified for Super League
Relegation to B League

Pld – Played; W – Won; L – Lost; PF – Points for; PA – Points against; Diff – Difference; Pts – Points.

As of 21 April 2014

=== Schedule and results ===
	BOR	CRN	FMP	KON	MER	MET	NAP	BEO	SLB	SLG	SME	TAM	VOJ	VRS
Borac Mozzart Sport		76–73	85–76	69-81	80–69	66-81	76–71	70–65	73–52	70–60	71–59	65–61	64–63	82–77
Crnokosa	79–74		82–81	81–67	90–74	77-82	91–85	86–60	96–62	82-84	80–68	66–43	94-99	88–85
FMP	85–76	79-85		77–74	87–75	79–71	105–52	81–71	89–65	101–57	92–75	76–70	78–58	98–97
Konstantin	77–73	72-74	73–56		77–75	78–73	72–61	95–75	91–65	83–81	83–70	81–74	64–58	69-76
Meridiana	65-68	72-104	67-75	74-91		75–74	70–52	86-95	90–88	104–98	100–77	48-71	71-90	77-84
Metalac Farmakom	70–68	74-78	62-70	69–68	90–68		84–60	82–78	84–76	80–64	97–77	69–65	77–60	84–64
Napredak Rubin	84–73	65–57	62–56	82-87	69–62	77–76		77-80	79–56	75–58	67–51	66–64	78–73	65–59
OKK Beograd	87-93	73-79	63-93	89–63	82–67	76-84	75–62		87–73	88–68	89–85	100–76	94–90	84–76
Sloboda	64-82	79-87	82-94	74–62	83–81	54-91	71–68	87-91		85-88	66-73	62-64	77–65	79-89
Sloga	65-69	68-69	62-71	65–61	78–62	89–85	77–74	81-83	85–81		86–66	84–60	82–64	96–78
Smederevo 1953	79-81	82–62	87-91	87–82	96–93	85–75	80–75	77–66	85–67	77–63		64-66	66-72	101–86
Tamiš	64–53	59-76	87–81	67–58	70-73	71-78	75–63	89–82	79–63	71–59	76–71		69–65	60-61
Vojvodina Srbijagas	66-67	77–58	60-67	71–67	82–75	74–70	82–58	76–52	74-79	94–83	67-76	68–61		94–86
Vršac	81–64	92–82	67-77	97-98	102–78	80-84	70–67	63-75	105–86	95–84	73–62	94–63	93–91	

=== Positions by round ===
Team\Round																										
	01	02	03	04	05	06	07	08	09	10	11	12	13	14	15	16	17	18	19	20	21	22	23	24	25	26
Borac Mozzart Sport	3	2	1	3	5	4	6	4	2	2	2	2	3	3	3	2	3	3	3	3	5	4	5	4	4	4
Crnokosa	2	1	2	1	2	3	2	1	1	1	1	1	1	2	2	1	2	2	2	2	2	2	3	3	2	2
FMP	14	10	10	9	11	7	10	6	3	3	3	3	2	1	1	3	1	1	1	1	1	1	1	1	1	1
Konstantin	1	4	3	2	1	1	1	3	4	4	4	4	5	7	4	4	4	6	6	6	6	6	6	5	5	5
Meridiana	6	6	4	6	7	10	8	10	12	12	9	10	12	13	11	13	12	13	13	13	13	13	13	13	13	13
Metalac Farmakom	5	8	5	7	4	6	4	5	6	5	6	5	7	4	6	7	5	4	4	4	3	3	2	2	3	3
Napredak Rubin	9	7	11	11	9	12	11	11	10	10	11	11	9	9	10	10	10	10	10	11	11	12	12	12	12	10
OKK Beograd	10	14	7	5	3	2	3	2	5	6	5	6	4	5	8	5	6	5	5	5	4	5	4	6	6	6
Sloboda	4	3	6	4	6	9	13	14	14	14	14	14	14	14	14	14	14	14	14	14	14	14	14	14	14	14
Sloga	12	9	12	12	14	11	14	12	13	13	13	12	10	11	12	11	11	11	11	10	10	9	11	11	10	11
Smederevo 1953	13	5	9	8	12	8	5	9	7	7	7	8	8	6	7	8	9	7	7	7	8	8	10	10	9	12
Tamiš	8	12	8	13	13	14	12	13	11	11	12	13	11	10	9	9	7	8	8	8	7	7	7	9	11	9
Vojvodina Srbijagas	11	13	14	10	8	5	7	7	8	9	10	9	13	12	13	12	13	12	12	12	12	10	8	7	8	8
Vršac	7	11	13	14	10	13	9	8	9	8	8	7	6	8	5	6	8	9	9	9	9	11	9	8	7	7

== Super League ==
As of 16 June 2014

=== Standings ===
Pos	Team	Total						
Pos	Team	P	W	L	F	A	D	Pts
1	Partizan NIS	14	13	1	1199	1005	+194	27
2	Crvena Zvezda Telekom	14	11	3	1187	988	+199	25
3	Mega Vizura	14	9	5	1226	1148	+78	23
4	Radnički Kragujevac	14	8	6	1184	1090	+94	22
5	FMP	14	5	9	1005	1067	-62	19
6	Metalac Farmakom	14	4	10	964	1102	-138	18
7	Crnokosa	14	3	11	1003	1252	-249	17
8	Borac Mozzart Sport	14	3	11	1009	1125	-116	17

P=Matches played, W=Matches won, L=Matches lost, F=Points for, A=Points against, D=Points difference, Pts=Points

Qualification for Adriatic League

=== Schedule and results ===
	BOR	CRN	CZV	FMP	MEG	MET	PAR	RKG
Borac Mozzart Sport		72-80	70-78	67-75	83-71	79-61	75-80	81-83
Crnokosa	89-82		63-89	71-64	81-97	70-79	61-95	74-90
Crvena Zvezda Telekom	85–63	109-68		83-67	79-91	90-53	78-82	82–62
FMP	85–66	76-61	65-87		67-96	72–61	63-70	81-71
Mega Vizura	95–72	94–84	76-89	98-91		79-56	82-92	91-86
Metalac Farmakom	72-73	95-72	66-85	64-63	77–72		67-95	81-96
Partizan NIS	85-59	101–71	72-75	86-82	93-82	76-63		96-78
Radnički Kragujevac	86-67	109-58	90-78	86–54	98-102	80–69	69-76	

== Playoff stage ==
=== Semifinals ===
Game 1

June 7
19:00

Report

Partizan NIS	89–81	Radnički Kragujevac
Scoring by quarter: 27-14, 25-25, 18-25, 19-17
Pts: Tepić 14; Rebs: Milutinov 10; Asts: Bogdanović 8		Pts: Mlađan 24; Rebs: Marinović 8 Asts: Marinović 9

Pionir Hall, Belgrade
Attendance: 3,500
Referees: Milivoje Jovčić, Dragan Nešković, Saša Maričić

June 8
20:00

Report

Crvena Zvezda Telekom	81–70	Mega Vizura
Scoring by quarter: 24-17, 19-17, 19-19, 19-17
Pts: Lazić 14; Rebs: Lazić, Mitrović 6 Asts: Nelson 8		Pts: Varda 20; Rebs: Veličković 8 Asts: Miljenović 8

Pionir Hall, Belgrade
Attendance: 3 500
Referees: Uroš Nikolić, Vladimir Jevtović, Ivan Stefanović

Game 2

10 June
20:00

Report

Radnički Kragujevac	75–86	Partizan NIS
Scoring by quarter: 22-23, 23-25, 9-19, 21-19
Pts: Birčević 17; Rebs: Birčević 8 Asts: Kalinić 5		Pts: Pavlović 19; Rebs: 3 players 7 Asts: Bertāns 5
Partizan NIS wins series 2-0

Jezero Hall, Kragujevac
Attendance: 3 100
Referees: Milija Vojinović, Vladimir Jevtović, Milan Mažić

8 June
20:00

Report

Mega Vizura	95–101	Crvena Zvezda Telekom
Scoring by quarter: 25-26, 26-22, 15-25, 29-28
Pts: Veličković 23; Rebs: Veličković 10; Asts: Micić 6		Pts: Katić 26; Rebs: Nelson 6 Asts: Nelson 5
Crvena Zvezda Telekom wins series 2-0

New Belgrade Sports Hall, Belgrade
Attendance: 1 500
Referees: Ilija Belošević, Aleksandar Glišić, Saša Maričić

=== Final ===
Game 1

14 June
20:00

Report

Partizan NIS	88–97	Crvena Zvezda Telekom
Scoring by quarter: 15-24, 17-21, 30-21, 26-31
Pts: Bogdanović 34; Rebs: Lauvergne 13; Asts: Tepić 6		Pts: Jenkins 16; Rebs: Mitrović, Nelson 5 Asts: Jenkins 4

Pionir Hall, Belgrade
Attendance: 5 500
Referees: Ilija Belošević, Uroš Nikolić, Uroš Obrknežević

Game 2

June 16
20:00

Report

Crvena Zvezda Telekom	62–82	Partizan NIS
Scoring by quarter: 11-23, 18-17, 21-19, 12-23
Pts: Blažič 19; Rebs: Jenkins 6 Asts: Jenkins 4		Pts: Bogdanović 33; Rebs: Gagić 9 Asts: Bogdanović, Lauvergne 5

Pionir Hall, Belgrade
Attendance: 4 000
Referees: Milija Vojinović, Vladimir Jevtović, Saša Maričić

Game 3

June 19
20:00

Report

Partizan NIS	77–67	Crvena Zvezda Telekom
Scoring by quarter: 17-19, 27-18, 19-15, 14-15
Pts: Bogdanović 20; Rebs: Lauvergne 10; Asts: Tepić 4		Pts: Marjanović 22; Rebs: Marjanović 7 Asts: Nelson 3

Pionir Hall, Belgrade
Attendance: 0
Referees: Milivoje Jovčić, Dragan Nešković, Aleksandar Glišić

Game 4

June 21
20:00

Report

Crvena Zvezda Telekom	87–95 (OT)	Partizan NIS
Scoring by quarter: 22-21, 13-15, 17-15, 20-21, Overtime: 15-23
Pts: Jenkins 16; Rebs: Blažič 7 Asts: Nelson 6		Pts: Bogdanović 36; Rebs: Lauvergne 10; Asts: Bogdanović 6

Pionir Hall, Belgrade
Attendance: 3 911
Referees: Milija Vojinović, Vladimir Jevtović, Saša Maričić

=== Bracket ===
Semifinals
1	Partizan NIS	2
4	Radnički Kragujevac	0
2	Crvena Zvezda Telekom	2
3	Mega Vizura	0

Final
1	Partizan NIS	3
2	Crvena Zvezda Telekom	1

2013–14 Basketball League of Serbia Champions

Partizan NIS
21st title

== Stats leaders ==
=== MVP Round by Round ===
First League

Round	Player	Team	Efficiency
1	(Serbia) Uroš Mirković	Sloga	34
2	(Serbia) Andrija Simović	Smederevo	34
2	(Serbia) Nikola Malešević	Sloboda	34
3	(Serbia) Radenko Pilčević	Crnokosa	40
4	(Serbia) Andrija Bojić	OKK Beograd	43
5	(Serbia) Jovan Novak	Vršac	51
6	(Serbia) Rajko Kljajević	Sloga	38
7	(Serbia) Ivan Đurović	Meridiana	38
8	(Serbia) Andrija Bojić (2)	OKK Beograd	43
9	(Serbia) Jovan Novak (2)	Vršac	31
10	(Serbia) Filip Šepa	OKK Beograd	38
11	(Serbia) Andrija Bojić (3)	OKK Beograd	50
12	(Serbia) Branko Andjić	Sloboda	31
13	(Serbia) Ognjen Jaramaz	Smederevo	36
14	(Serbia) Slobodan Dunđerski	FMP	31
15	(Serbia) Marko Zoćević	Sloboda	35
16	(Serbia) Nikola Otović	Sloga	42
17	(Serbia) Miroslav Radić	Crnokosa	37
18	(Serbia) Andrija Bojić (4)	OKK Beograd	42
19	(Serbia) Đorđe Milošević	Vršac	34
19	(Serbia) Dejan Đokić	Vojvodina	34
20	(Serbia) Andrija Bojić (5)	OKK Beograd	34
21	(Serbia) Andrija Bojić (6)	OKK Beograd	53
22	(Serbia) Đorđe Kaplanović	FMP	35
23	(Serbia) Andrija Bojić (7)	OKK Beograd	37
24	(Serbia) Mladen Pantić	Borac Čačak	33
25	(Serbia) Ognjen Jaramaz (2)	Smederevo	36
26	(Montenegro) Bojan Bakić	Metalac	35

Super League

Round	Player	Team	Efficiency
1	(Serbia) Boban Marjanović	Crvena Zvezda	26
2	(Serbia) Bogić Vujošević	Crnokosa	31
3	(Serbia) Slobodan Dunđerski	FMP	39
4	(Serbia) Novica Veličković	Mega Vizura	31
5	(Serbia) Marko Čakarević	Metalac	31
6	(Serbia) Aleksandar Marelja	Borac Čačak	34
7	(Serbia) Boban Marjanović (2)	Crvena Zvezda	32
8	(Serbia) Boban Marjanović (3)	Crvena Zvezda	38
9	(Serbia) Stefan Birčević & (France) Joffrey Lauvergne	Radnički Kragujevac & Partizan	30
10	(Serbia) Stefan Birčević (2)	Radnički Kragujevac	36
11	(Serbia) Slobodan Dunđerski (2)	FMP	36
12	(Serbia) Marko Dujković	Metalac	35
13	(Serbia) Novica Veličković (2)	Mega Vizura	27
14	(Serbia) Nikola Jokić	Mega Vizura	26

Play off

Round	Player	Team	Efficiency
