= Dragan Vaščanin =

Serbian basketball coach

Free agent
- Position: Head coach

Personal information
- Born: 22 December 1971 (age 54) SFR Yugoslavia
- Coaching career: 1994–present

Career history

Coaching
- 1994–1998: Beovuk (youth)
- 1998–1999: FMP Železnik (youth)
- 1999–2000: Srem
- 2000–2001: Železnik Workers
- 2001–2002: FMP Železnik (assistant)
- 2002–2004: Budućnost (assistant)
- 2004–2005: Hercegovac Bileća
- 2005: Napredak Kruševac
- 2005–2006: Atlas
- 2007–2008: Serbia U16 team
- 2009: Nova Gorica
- 2009: Radnički Basket
- 2010: Crnokosa
- 2010–2011: Crvena zvezda Juniors
- 2011–2012: Manama Club (youth)
- 2012–2015: Al Kuwait (youth)
- 2015: Al Kuwait
- 2016–2018: Al-Nweidrat
- 2018–2019: Al-Sharjah (assistant)
- 2019–2020: Al-Riffa
Medals
Men's basketball
Head Coach for Serbia
FIBA U16 European Championship
Gold medal – first place	2007 Greece	Team

Dragan Vaščanin (Serbian Cyrillic: Драган Вашчанин; born 22 December 1971) is a Serbian professional basketball coach.

== Coaching career ==
In the early 2000s, Vaščanin was an assistant for FMP Železnik and Budućnost.

In summer 2004, Vaščanin became a head coach for the Bosnian club Hercegovac Bileća. In August 2005, Vaščanin became a head coach for Napredak Kruševac. He got fired in December 2005. Two weeks later, he was named a head coach for Atlas.

Vaščanin was a head coach of the Serbia men's under-16 team at the 2007 FIBA Europe Under-16 Championship in Greece and the 2008 FIBA Europe Under-16 Championship in Italy. He won the gold medal at the 2007 Championship.

In the late 2000s, Vaščanin coached Nova Gorica (Slovenia), Radnički Basket, and Crnokosa.

=== Middle East ===
In summer 2011, Vaščanin was named a youth coach of Bahraini club Manama Club. In summer 2012, Vaščanin became a head coach, as well as a youth coach, for Al Kuwait of the Kuwaiti Division I League. On 31 July 2016, he became a head coach for Al-Nweidrat of the Bahraini Premier League.

In August 2018, Vaščanin signed for Al-Sharjah of the UAE League as an assistant coach and a youth teams coordinator.

== Career achievements ==
- Cup of Serbia winner: 1 (with Atlas Belgrade: 2005–06)
- Yugoslavian Junior League champion: 1 (with Beovuk Juniors: 1995–96)
- Kuwait U18 League champion: 2 (with BC Kuwait U18 team: 2013, 2014)
- Kuwait U20 League champion: 1 (with BC Kuwait U20 team: 2015)
