= Dušan Gvozdić =

Serbian basketball coach

Personal information
- Born: 8 March 1978 (age 48) Vršac, SR Serbia, SFR Yugoslavia
- Position: Assistant coach
- Coaching career: 1996–present

Career history

Coaching
- 1996–1999: Partizan (youth system)
- 1999–2004: Hemofarm (assistant)
- 2006: Lietuvos Rytas (assistant)
- 2007–2008: Mega Aqua Monta (assistant)
- 2008–2009: Universitet Yugra Surgut (assistant)
- 2009–2012: Hemofarm (assistant)
- 2012: Hemofarm (interim)
- 2012–2013: Polytekhnika-Halychyna (assistant)
- 2014: Belarus
- 2014–2015: Vršac Swisslion
- 2016–2017: Bosna
- 2017–2018: Oettinger Rockets (assistant)
- 2018–2022: Toyota Alvark (assistant)
- 2023–present: Sun Rockers Shibuya (assistant)
Medals
Men's basketball
Assistant Coach for Serbia
EuroBasket
Silver medal – second place	2009 Poland	Team
Summer Universiade
Gold medal – first place	2009 Belgrade	Uni. Team

Dušan Gvozdić (Serbian: Душан Гвоздић; born 8 March 1978) is a Serbian professional basketball coach. His most recent position was an assistant coach for Toyota Alvark of the Japan Professional Basketball League B.League.

== Coaching career ==
Gvozdić worked as an assistant coach for the Hemofarm (Yugoslavia), Lietuvos Rytas (Lithuania) Mega Aqua Monta (Serbia), Polytekhnika-Halychyna (Ukraine), Universitet Yugra Surgut (Russia). He was interim head coach for Hemofarm in start of 2012.

In December 2014, Gvozdić was named head coach for the Vršac Swisslion. He resigned in November 2015. On February 23, 2016, Gvozdić became head coach for the Bosna of the Basketball Championship of Bosnia and Herzegovina. That season Bosna Royal ended as a runner up, both in Bosnian championship and cup. After resigning at Bosnia Royal in July 2017, Gvozdic signed as an assistant coach for the Oettinger Rockets for the 2017–18 BBL season.

In the 2018–19 B.League season, Gvozdić assigned for Alvark Tokyo. The team won the championship title the same season.

=== National team coaching career ===
In 2006, Gvozdić was named an assistant coach of the Bosnia and Herzegovina national team for the EuroBasket 2007 qualification. He left in 2007.

Gvozdić was a coaching staff member of the Serbian men's university basketball team that won the gold medal at the 2009 Summer Universiade in Belgrade.

Gvozdić was an assistant coach with the Serbia national team from 2009 to 2013. Serbia national team played at the EuroBasket 2009, EuroBasket 2011 and the 2010 FIBA World Championship, under renowned European head coach Dušan Ivković.

In 2014, Gvozdić was named as head coach of the Belarus national basketball team. He coached them during EuroBasket 2015 qualification – Second round.

In 2016, Gvozdić was an assistant coach for the Switzerland men's national basketball team.

== Career achievements ==
As head coach

- Serbian League Cup winner: 1 (with Vršac: 2014–15)
- Bosnian A1 League champion: 1 (with Bosna: 2016–17)

As assistant coach

- Japanese League champion: 1 (with Toyota Alvark: 2018–19)
- ABA League champion: 1 (with Hemofarm: 2004–05)
