= 2018–19 Radivoj Korać Cup =

2019 Triglav osiguranje^{1} Radivoj Korać Cup
- Season: 2018–19
- Duration: 14–17 February 2019
- Games played: 7
- Teams: 8
- TV partner(s): Arena Sport

Regular season
- Season MVP: (Bosnia and Herzegovina) Alex Renfroe

Finals
- Champions: Partizan NIS
- Runners-up: Crvena zvezda mts

Awards
- Top Scorer: (Australia) Jock Landale
- ^{1} Sponsored cup name, referring to Triglav Osiguranje

The 2019 Triglav osiguranje Radivoj Korać Cup was the 17th season of the Serbian men's national basketball cup tournament. The tournament was held in Niš from 14–17 February 2019.

== Qualified teams ==
ABA League First Division	Basketball League of Serbia	Cup of Serbia (2nd-tier)
Crvena zvezda mts FMP; Mega Bemax; Partizan NIS	Borac (1st)^{1} Dynamic VIP PAY (2nd)^{1}	Novi Pazar (winner); Sveti Đorđe (runners-up)

^{1} League table position after 13 rounds played

== Venue ==
Niš	2018–19 Radivoj Korać Cup (Serbia)
Čair Sports Center	2018–19 Radivoj Korać Cup (Serbia)
Capacity: 5,000 expanded	2018–19 Radivoj Korać Cup (Serbia)

== Draw ==
The draw was held in the Hyatt Regency hotel in Belgrade on 31 January 2019.

Seeded	Unseeded
Crvena zvezda mts	Borac
FMP	Dynamic VIP PAY
Mega Bemax	Novi Pazar
Partizan NIS	Sveti Đorđe

== Bracket ==
Quarterfinals
14 February
FMP	112
Sveti Đorđe	58
14 February
Partizan NIS	102
Novi Pazar	72
15 February
Crvena zvezda mts	75
Dynamic VIP PAY	70
15 February
Mega Bemax	73
Borac	69

Semifinals
16 February
FMP	71
Partizan NIS	83
16 February
Crvena zvezda mts	92
Mega Bemax	73

Final
17 February
Partizan NIS	76
Crvena zvezda mts	74

== Quarterfinals ==
=== FMP v Sveti Đorđe ===
Arena Sport

14 February 2019
17:00

Boxscore

FMP	112–58	Sveti Đorđe
Scoring by quarter: 23–23, 31–11, 29–9, 29–15
Pts: Đorđević 20; Rebs: Rebec 7 Asts: Rebec 8		Pts: Tomić 22; Rebs: Tomić, Čuč 6 Asts: Tomić 6

Čair Sports Center, Niš
Attendance: 1,000
Referees: Nemanja Ninković, Vladimir Vesković, Petar Pešić

=== Partizan NIS v Novi Pazar ===
Arena Sport

14 February 2019
19:30

Boxscore

Partizan NIS	102–72	Novi Pazar
Scoring by quarter: 26–20, 25–15, 23–19, 28–18
Pts: Gagić 27; Rebs: Gagić 12; Asts: Jaramaz 7		Pts: Radonjić 21; Rebs: Vujović 7 Asts: Berbakov 5

Čair Sports Center, Niš
Attendance: 2,000
Referees: Saša Maričić, Ivan Stefanović, Dragan Matić

=== Mega Bemax v Borac ===
Arena Sport

15 February 2019
17:00

Boxscore

Mega Bemax	73–69	Borac
Scoring by quarter: 10–13, 16–23, 21–22, 26–11
Pts: Mišković 17; Rebs: Fundić 7 Asts: Ašćerić, Mokoka 6		Pts: Đoković 23; Rebs: Prlja 8 Asts: Đoković 4

Čair Sports Center, Niš
Attendance: 1,000
Referees: Jasmina Juras, Branislav Mrdak, Vladimir Jevtović

=== Crvena zvezda mts v Dynamic VIP PAY ===
Arena Sport

15 February 2019
19:30

Boxscore

Crvena zvezda mts	75–70	Dynamic VIP PAY
Scoring by quarter: 13–19, 17–20, 18–19, 27–12
Pts: Baron 21; Rebs: Zirbes 7 Asts: Ragland 8		Pts: Glišić 23; Rebs: Glišić 9 Asts: Rakićević 6

Čair Sports Center, Niš
Attendance: 3,000
Referees: Aleksandar Glišić, Siniša Prpa, Radoš Arsenijević

== Semifinals ==
=== FMP v Partizan NIS ===
Arena Sport

16 February 2019
17:00

Boxscore

FMP	71–83	Partizan NIS
Scoring by quarter: 16–21, 20–18, 21–24, 14–20
Pts: Pot 15; Rebs: Reath 10; Asts: Rebec 6		Pts: Landale 18; Rebs: Landale 8 Asts: Renfroe 8

Čair Sports Center, Niš
Attendance: 3,000
Referees: Ilija Belošević, Uroš Obrknežević, Uroš Nikolić

=== Crvena zvezda mts v Mega Bemax ===
Arena Sport

16 February 2019
21:00

Boxscore

Crvena zvezda mts	92–73	Mega Bemax
Scoring by quarter: 12–16, 30–21, 18–24, 32–12
Pts: Baron 20; Rebs: Ristić 8 Asts: Ragland 9		Pts: Atić 20; Rebs: Stanić 9 Asts: Ratkovica 10

Čair Sports Center, Niš
Attendance: 3,000
Referees: Milivoje Jovčić, Milija Vojinović, Marko Juras

== Final ==
Arena Sport

17 February 2019
17:00

Boxscore

Partizan NIS	76–74	Crvena zvezda mts
Scoring by quarter: 19–18, 18–15, 18–24, 21–17
Pts: Renfroe, Landale 18; Rebs: Renfroe 7 Asts: Renfroe 10		Pts: Baron 18; Rebs: Perperoglou, Ristić 5 Asts: Ragland 9

Čair Sports Center, Niš
Attendance: 4.500
Referees: Ilija Belošević, Milivoje Jovčić, Uroš Obrknežević

Starters:			Pts	Reb	Ast
G	32	(Bosnia and Herzegovina) Alex Renfroe	18	7	10
SG	9	(Serbia) Vanja Marinković	7	3	0
F	5	(France) Bandja Sy	5	3	1
PF	12	(Serbia) Novica Veličković	9	5	1
C	34	(Australia) Jock Landale	18	4	0
Reserves:					
F/C	1	(Serbia) Nikola Janković	2	4	0
G	2	(United States) Marcus Paige	0	1	2
G	10	(Serbia) Ognjen Jaramaz	5	1	2
G	11	(Bosnia and Herzegovina) Amar Gegić	0	2	0
F/C	15	(Serbia) Marko Pecarski	DNP		
F/C	33	(Serbia) Stefan Janković	4	3	0
C	41	(Serbia) Đorđe Gagić	8	4	0
Head coach:
(Italy) Andrea Trinchieri

Partizan	Crvena zvezda

PAR	Statistics	CZV
19/36 (52%)	2-pt field goals	16/28 (57%)
7/19 (36%)	3-pt field goals	10/34 (29%)
17/24 (70%)	Free throws	12/16 (75%)
11	Offensive rebounds	10
28	Defensive rebounds	19
39	Total rebounds	29
16	Assists	11
13	Turnovers	7
3	Steals	6
2	Blocks	4
19 (25)	Fouls	25 (19)

2018–19 Radivoj Korać Cup Champions
Partizan NIS
15th title
MVP
(Bosnia and Herzegovina) Alex Renfroe

Starters:			Pts	Reb	Ast
PG	1	(United States) Joe Ragland	17	3	9
SG	12	(United States) Billy Baron	18	4	1
SF	5	(Greece) Stratos Perperoglou	3	5	0
PF	22	(Serbia) Boriša Simanić	7	2	0
C	33	(Germany) Maik Zirbes	3	4	0
Reserves:					
PG	3	(Serbia) Filip Čović	2	1	1
SF	4	(Serbia) Marko Kešelj	0	1	0
SF	7	(Serbia) Dejan Davidovac	17	2	0
G	9	(Serbia) Nemanja Nenadić	DNP		
SF	10	(Serbia) Branko Lazić	0	0	0
G/F	13	(Serbia) Ognjen Dobrić	2	1	0
C	14	(Serbia) Dušan Ristić	4	5	0
Head coach:
(Serbia) Milan Tomić

== See also ==
- 2018–19 Basketball Cup of Serbia
- 2018–19 Basketball League of Serbia
- 2018 ABA League Supercup
- 2018–19 Milan Ciga Vasojević Cup
