= 2012–13 Basketball Cup of Serbia =

Season of the Serbian 2nd-tier men's cup tournament

2012–13 Cup of Serbia
- Season: 2012–13
- Duration: November 7, 2012 – December 18, 2012
- Games played: 12
- Teams: 13

Finals
- Champions: Metalac
- Runners-up: Radnički FMP

The 2012–13 Basketball Cup of Serbia is the 7th season of the Serbian 2nd-tier men's cup tournament.

Valjevo-based team Metalac won the Cup.

== Bracket ==
First round
Morava	50
Konstantin	65
Slodes	46
Metalac	83
Knjaževac	67
Spartak Subotica	64
Napredak Rubin	76
Smederevo 1953	79
Korićani	42
Radnički FMP	80

Quarterfinals
Železničar Inđija	65
Konstantin	79
Metalac	95
Mega Vizura	66
Knjaževac	74
Smederevo 1953	107
Meridiana	80
Radnički FMP	82

Semifinals
Konstantin	63
Metalac	69
Smederevo 1953	80
Radnički FMP	93

Final
18 December 2012; Valjevo
Metalac	63
Radnički FMP	56

Source: Basketball Federation of Serbia

== See also ==
- 2012–13 Radivoj Korać Cup
- 2012–13 Basketball League of Serbia
