= Aleksej Nešović =

Bosnian basketball player

Free agent
- Position: Point guard

Personal information
- Born: 14 March 1985 (age 41) Sarajevo, SFR Yugoslavia
- Listed height: 1.89 m (6 ft 2 in)
- Listed weight: 85 kg (187 lb)

Career information
- NBA draft: 2007: undrafted
- Playing career: 2002–present

Career history
- 2002–2005: Crvena zvezda
- 2004–2005: →Ergonom
- 2005–2006: EnBW Ludwigsburg
- 2006: Zagreb
- 2006–2007: Hemofarm
- 2007–2008: Fuenlabrada
- 2008: Olympias Patras
- 2008–2009: Asseco Prokom Gdynia
- 2009: Union Olimpija
- 2009: Aliağa Petkim
- 2010: Borac Čačak
- 2010–2011: Buducnost Podgorica
- 2011–2012: Hemofarm
- 2012: Radnički Kragujevac
- 2012–2013: OKK Beograd
- 2013: AEK Larnaca
- 2014: Lirija
- 2014–2016: Kožuv
- 2016–2018: OKK Beograd
- 2018: MZT Skopje
- 2018: Proleter Zrenjanin
- 2018–2019: Novi Pazar
- 2019: Mladost Zemun
- 2019–2021: Novi Pazar

Career highlights
- Slovenian League champion (2009); Montenegrin League champion (2011); Serbian Cup winner (2004); Slovenian Cup winner (2009); Montenegrin Cup winner (2011); Macedonian Cup winner (2018); Serbian League Cup winner (2019)

Aleksej Nešović (Serbian: Алексеј Нешовић; born 14 March 1985) is a Bosnian professional basketball player. Standing at 1.89 m (6 ft 2 1/2 in) he plays at the point guard position. He also represented the Bosnia and Herzegovina national basketball team internationally.
