= Branko Maksimović =

Serbian basketball player and coach

Personal information
- Born: April 28, 1974 (age 52) Belgrade, SFR Yugoslavia
- Position: Head coach
- Coaching career: 1997–present

Career history

Coaching
- 1997–2001: Radnički Belgrade (youth)
- 2001–2002: Crvena zvezda (assistant)
- 2002–2003: NIS Vojvodina (assistant)
- 2004–2005: Radnički Belgrade (assistant)
- 2005–2006: Kasta Belgrade (youth)
- 2007–2009: Hemofarm (assistant)
- 2009–2014: Radnički Kragujevac (assistant)
- 2014–2015: Baník Handlová
- 2015: Inter Bratislava
- 2016: Crvena zvezda (youth)
- 2016–2017: FMP
- 2017–2018: Mladost Admiral
- 2018: Vršac
- 2019–2020: Handlová
- 2021: Lokomotiv Kuban (assistant)
- 2021–2022: Lokomotiv Kuban
Medals
Men's basketball
Assistant Coach for Serbia
U-19 World Championship
Gold medal – first place	2007 Novi Sad	Team
U-20 European Championship
Gold medal – first place	2006 Izmir	Team

Branko Maksimović (Serbian Cyrillic: Бранко Максимовић; born 28 April 28, 1974) is a Serbian basketball coach and former player who last worked as the head coach for Lokomotiv Kuban of the VTB United League.

== Coaching career ==
Maksimović was an assistant coach for Crvena zvezda, NIS Vojvodina, Radnički Belgrade, Hemofarm and Radnički Kragujevac. He was long-term assistant coach of Miroslav Nikolić (Crvena zvezda, NIS Vojvodina, Hemofarm, Serbia youth teams, Radnički Kragujevac). He also was a coach in youth system for Radnički Belgrade, Hemofarm and Crvena zvezda.

In 2014, Maksimović went to Slovakia and become a head coach for Baník Handlová of the Slovak Extraliga. In June 2015, he moved to Inter Bratislava where he stayed until November 2015.

After the start of the 2016–17 season in the Adriatic League, Maksimović took over FMP after Slobodan Klipa resign. He left after on the end of the season. On June 11, 2017, Maksimović was named a head coach of the Zemun's team Mladost Admiral. He left the club in July 2018.

On August 24, 2018, Maksimović became a head coach for Vršac. Vršac parted ways with him on January 4, 2019.

In February 2021, Maksimović became an assistant coach of Lokomotiv Kuban under Evgeniy Pashutin. In December 2021, he got promoted as the head coach for Lokomotiv.

== National teams coaching career ==
In July 2006, Maksimović was an assistant coach for the Serbia and Montenegro under-20 team that won a gold medal at the FIBA Europe Championship in İzmir, Turkey. In July 2007, he was an assistant coach for the Serbia under-19 team that won a gold medal at the FIBA U19 World Championship in Novi Sad, Serbia. In July/August 2008, he was an assistant coach for Serbia under-18 team at the FIBA Europe Championship in Greece.
