= Vanja Guša =

Serbian basketball coach

Free agent
- Position: Head coach

Personal information
- Born: 28 July 1966 (age 60) Zadar, SR Croatia, SFR Yugoslavia
- Coaching career: 1993–present

Career history

Coaching
- 2007–2009: FMP Želežnik U18
- 2009–2010: Radnički Basket (assistant)
- 2010–2011: FMP Želežnik U18
- 2012–2013: Crvena zvezda (youth)
- 2013–2016: Kazma (assistant)
- 2016–2017: Al Kuwait SC
- 2017–2019: Zlatibor
- 2021: FMP

Career highlights
- Serbian League Cup winner (2018); 2× Euroleague NGT (2008, 2009); Kuwait Basketball League Championship (2017)
Medals
Men's basketball
Head Coach for Serbia
FIBA Europe Under-16 Championship
Silver medal – second place	2013 Ukraine	U16 Team
FIBA Under-17 World Championship
Bronze medal – third place	2014 UAE	U17 Team

Vanja Guša (Serbian Cyrillic: Вања Гуша; born 28 July 1966) is a Serbian basketball coach.

== Early life ==
Guša was born in Zadar, SR Croatia, SFR Yugoslavia to Serb parents. He started to play basketball in the youth system of his hometown team Zadar. However, his family later fled to Belgrade, at the start of the Yugoslav wars.

== Coaching career ==
=== Youth teams ===
Guša worked as a youth system coach for teams from Belgrade, such as: Beovuk 72 (1993–1995; 2003–2007), Beobanka (1996–1999), Avala Ada (2000–2003), FMP Železnik and Crvena zvezda. He won two Nike International Junior Tournaments (NIJT) with the FMP Železnik U18 team (2008, 2009).

=== Senior teams ===
In August 2013, Guša went to Kuwait. He was an assistant coach for Kazma of the Kuwaiti Division I League. On 23 July 2016, he was named the head coach for Al Kuwait SC.

On 13 July 2017, Guša was named the head coach for Zlatibor of the Basketball League of Serbia. He parted ways with Zlatibor in February 2019.

On 4 February 2021, Guša became the head coach of Montenegrin team Teodo Tivat. However, he parted ways with Teodo prior his debut. On 13 February, FMP hired Guša as their new head coach. He left FMP after the end of the 2020–21 season.

=== National youth teams ===
Guša was the head coach of the Serbia U16 team that won the silver medal at the 2013 FIBA Europe Under-16 Championship in Kyiv, Ukraine. Next year, he was the head coach for the Serbia U17 national team that won the bronze medal at the 2014 FIBA Under-17 World Championship in Dubai, United Arab Emirates. At both tournaments, Guša coached players such as Stefan Peno and Vanja Marinković.

In 2015, Guša was the head coach of the Serbian university team at the Summer Universiade in Gwangju, South Korea. His team finished 9th with a 6–2 record. Also, Guša coached a boys team for the European Youth Olympic Festival (2011–2013).

In February 2019, Guša signed with the Bahrain Basketball Association as the head coach for the Bahrain junior national team.

== Career achievements ==
- Serbian League Cup winner: 1 (with Zlatibor: 2017–18)
- Nike International Junior Tournament champion: 2 (with FMP U18: 2007–08, 2008–09)
- Kuwait Baseketball League Championship winner: Gold (with Al Kuwait SC: 2017)
- 2011 European Youth Olympic Festival: Silver
- 2013 European Youth Olympic Festival: Gold
