= Aleksandar Kalanj =

Serbian basketball player

Personal information
- Born: May 30, 1986 (age 40) Belgrade, SR Serbia, Yugoslavia
- Listed height: 2.08 m (6 ft 10 in)

Career information
- NBA draft: 2008: undrafted
- Playing career: 2007–present
- Position: Power forward

Career history
- 2007–2008: Spartak Pleven
- 2008–2009: Slavija Istocno Sarajevo
- 2009–2010: Napredak Kruševac
- 2010–2011: CS Energia Rovinari
- 2011–2012: Rabotnički
- 2012: Zemun
- 2013: Pelister
- 2013: KB Liria
- 2013–2014: CSU Pitești
- 2014–2015: Mladost Mrkonjić Grad
- 2015: Zornotza ST
- 2015–2018: Sarno Basket
- 2020–2023: Železničar Inđija

Aleksandar Kalanj (born May 30, 1986) is a Serbian professional basketball player who last played for Železničar Inđija.
