= Aleksandar Petrović (basketball, born 1987) =

Serbian basketball player

Free agent
- Position: Power forward

Personal information
- Born: December 8, 1987 (age 38) Belgrade, SR Serbia, SFR Yugoslavia
- Listed height: 2.03 m (6 ft 8 in)

Career information
- NBA draft: 2009: undrafted
- Playing career: 2007–present

Career history
- 2010–2011: KK Viva Basket
- 2011–2012: BKK Radnički
- 2012–2013: Darüşşafaka S.K.
- 2013–2014: Virtus Pallacanestro Bologna
- 2014: Ilysiakos B.C.
- 2014–2015: Básquet Coruña
- 2015–2016: Karpoš Sokoli
- 2016: Šentjur
- 2018: SZTE-Szedeák
- 2018–2019: Proleter Zrenjanin
- 2019–2020: BKK Radnički
- 2020–2021: Sveti Đorđe

Aleksandar Petrović (Serbian Cyrillic: Александар Петровић; born December 8, 1987) is a Serbian professional basketball player who last played for Sveti Đorđe of the Second Basketball League of Serbia. Standing at 2.03 m (6 ft 8 in) he plays at the power forward position.
