= 2013–14 Basketball Cup of Serbia =

2013–14 Cup of Serbia
- Season: 2013–14

Finals
- Champions: Borac Mozzart Sport
- Runners-up: FMP

The 2013–14 Basketball Cup of Serbia is the 8th season of the Serbian 2nd-tier men's cup tournament.

Čačak-based team Borac Mozzart Sport won the Cup.

== Bracket ==
Quarterfinals
Dunav	73
Mladost Zemun	77

Semifinals
Mladost Zemun	80
Borac Mozzart Sport	97
FMP	75
Metalac	63

Final
3 December 2013; Čačak
Borac Mozzart Sport	94
FMP	81

Source: Basketball Federation of Serbia

== See also ==
- 2013–14 Radivoj Korać Cup
- 2013–14 Basketball League of Serbia
