= Luka Stančić =

Serbian basketball coach and player

Personal information
- Born: 1939 Valjevo, Kingdom of Yugoslavia
- Died: 2 January 1990 (aged 50–51) Valjevo, SR Serbia, SFR Yugoslavia
- Coaching career: 1960–1990

Career history

Playing
- Metalac

Coaching
- 1960–1974: Metalac
- 1974–1975: Bosna
- 1976–1980: Yugoslavia Juniors & Cadets
- 1980: Vojvodina
- 1980–1985, 1987–1988, 1989–1990: Metalac
Medals
Men's basketball
Head Coach for Yugoslavia
European Championship for Juniors
Gold medal – first place	1976 Spain	Juniors
Silver medal – second place	1980 Yugoslavia	Juniors
Bronze medal – third place	1978 Italy	Juniors
European Championship for Cadets
Gold medal – first place	1979 Syria	Cadets
Silver medal – second place	1977 France	Cadets

Luka Stančić (Serbian Cyrillic: Лука Станчић; 1939 – 2 January 1990) was a Serbian professional basketball coach and player who spent entire playing career and the most of his coaching career with his hometown team Metalac. He's known for his coaching accomplishment with Yugoslavia Juniors & Cadets during the late 1970s.

== Coaching career ==
Stančić had three stints with his hometown team Metalac. Also, he coached Vojvodina and Sarajevo-based powerhouse Bosna. He spent a year coaching in Kuwait in the late 1980s.

=== Yugoslavia national teams ===
Stančić coached Yugoslavia cadet national team at two European Championships for Cadets. He won the gold medal at the 1979 Championship in Damascus, Syria and the silver medal at the 1977 Championship in Le Touquet and Berck, France.

Stančić coached Yugoslavia junior national team at three European Championships for Juniors. He won the gold medal at the 1976 Championship in Santiago de Compostela, Spain, the silver medal at the 1980 Championship in Yugoslav city Celje, and the bronze medal at the 1978 Italy in Roseto degli Abruzzi and Teramo, Italy. FIBA Hall of Fame coach Dušan Ivković was his assistant in 1976.

Stančić was an assistant coach of the Yugoslavia national team that won the bronze medal at the 1982 FIBA World Championship. Ranko Žeravica was a head coach of the Yugoslavia.

== Legacy ==
The Luka Stančić Memorial Tournament is a boy's youth age international basketball tournament organized to honor Stančić. It was inaugurated in 2012.
