= Mihailo Poček =

Serbian basketball player and coach

Personal information
- Born: May 18, 1960 (age 66) Valjevo, SR Serbia, SFR Yugoslavia
- Listed height: 1.80 m (5 ft 11 in)

Career information
- NBA draft: 1982: undrafted
- Playing career: 1976–1987, 1990–1993
- Position: Point guard
- Number: 5
- Coaching career: 1989–present

Career history

Playing
- 1976–1987: Metalac
- 1990–1991: Omladinac Valjevo
- 1992–1993: Big Enex Metalac

Coaching
- 1989–1990: Metalac (assistant)
- 1990–1992: Metalac
- 2000–2001: Hopsi Polzela
- 2002–2003: Kumanovo
- 2005–2008: Luka Koper
- Rudar
- 2011–2014: Koper
- 2015–2016: BLK Slavia Praha (women's)
- 2016–2019: Metalac
Medals
Men's basketball
Representing Yugoslavia
European Championship for Juniors
Bronze medal – third place	1978 Italy	Junior Team
European Championship for Cadets
Silver medal – second place	1977 France	Cadet Team

Mihailo Poček (Serbian Cyrillic: Михаило Почек; born May 18, 1960), sometimes also Mihajlo, is a Serbian basketball coach and former player.

== Playing career ==
Poček played for his hometown team Metalac. He made his Yugoslav First League debut during the 1976–77 season. In 1987, he retired.

In 1990, three years after retirement, Poček signed for his hometown-based team Omladinac.

== National team career ==
Poček was a member of the Yugoslavia junior national team that won the bronze medal at the 1978 European Championship for Juniors. Over three tournament games, he averaged 3.7 points per game. Also, he was a member of the cadet national team that won silver medal at the 1977 European Championship for Cadets. Over seven tournament games, he averaged 6.0 points per game.

== Coaching career ==
In May 2000, Poček became a head coach for the Slovenian team Hopsi Polzela. In August 2002, Poček became a head coach for the Kumanovo of the Macedonian League. He had two stints with Koper (Slovenia) and Ugljevik-based Rudar (Bosnia and Herzegovina).

In September 2015, Poček became a head coach for the BLK Slavia Praha of the Czech Women's Basketball League.

On September 27, 2016, Poček was named the head coach for the Metalac of the Basketball League of Serbia. He left Metalac on September 27, 2019.

== Personal life ==
His son is Velibor (born 1986).
