= Slobodan Klipa =

Serbian basketball player and coach

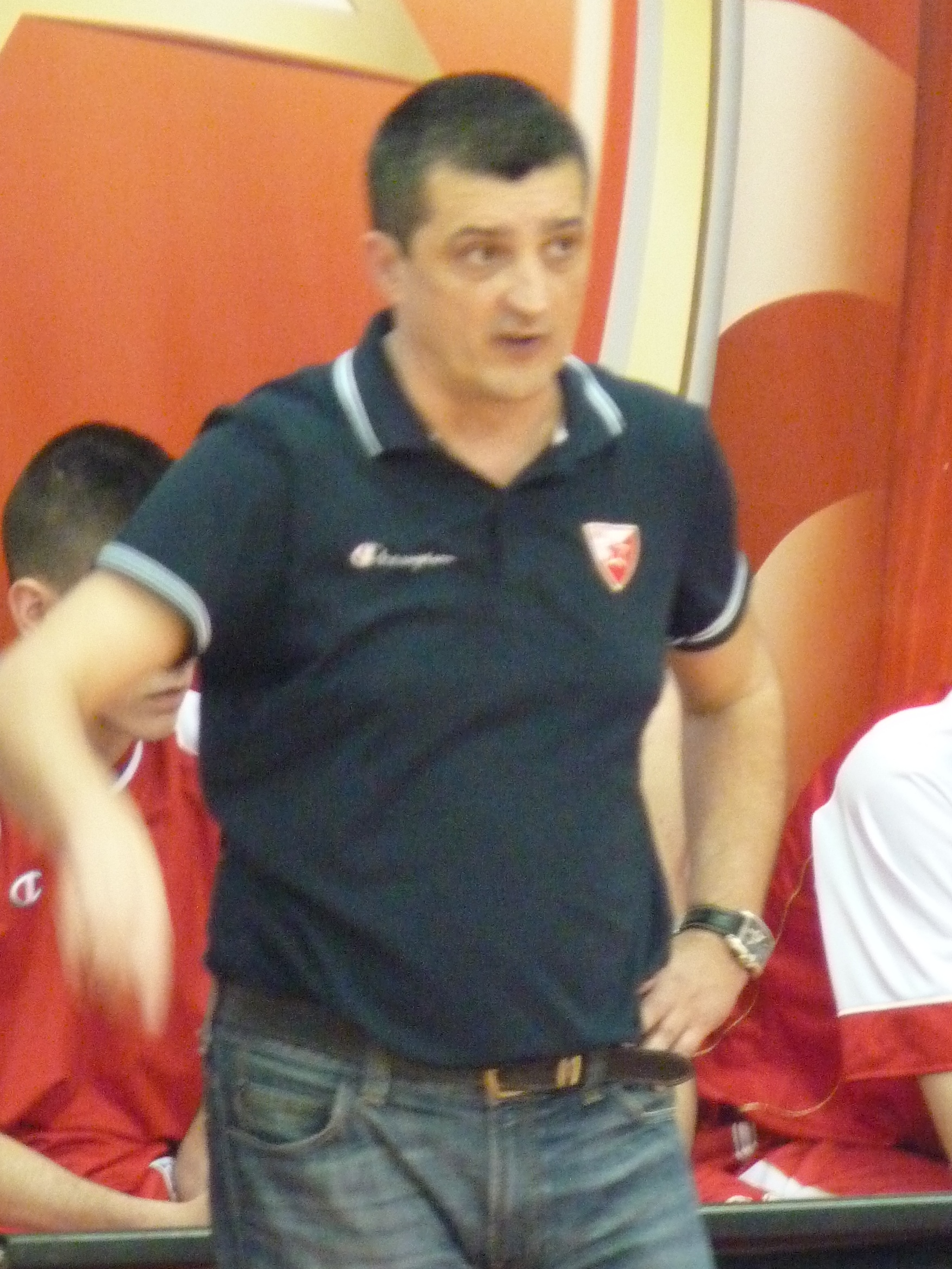
- Klipa coaching Crvena zvezda U19 in March 2015.

Qingdao
- Title: U-19 Head coach

Personal information
- Born: 1 August 1960 (age 66) Belgrade, Serbia, FPR Yugoslavia
- Listed height: 1.87 m (6 ft 2 in)

Career information
- NBA draft: 1982: undrafted
- Playing career: 1979–1996
- Position: Point guard
- Number: 7
- Coaching career: 1996–present

Career history

Coaching
- 1996–2000: Beopetrol U19
- 2000: Beopetrol
- 2000–2008: FMP Železnik U19
- 2008, 2009: FMP
- 2010–2011: Igokea
- 2012–2015: Crvena zvezda Youth
- 2015–2016: FMP
- 2016–2021, 2022: Crvena zvezda Youth
- 2022–present: Qingdao U19

Career highlights
- Serbian League Cup winner (2016)
Medals
Men's basketball
Head Coach for Serbia
U20 European Championship
Gold medal – first place	2008 Latvia	U20 Team
U16 European Championship
Bronze medal – third place	2017 Montenegro	U16 Team

Slobodan Klipa (Serbian Cyrillic: Слободан Клипа; born 1 August 1960) is a Serbian professional basketball coach and former player who serves as the U-19 head coach for Qingdao.

== Playing career ==
A point guard, Klipa played 17 seasons in Yugoslavia from 1979 to 1996. During his playing days, he played for KK Igman, Željezničar Sarajevo, Varda Višegrad, Kvarner, FMP Železnik, and Beopetrol. He retired as a player with Beopetrol in 1996.

== Coaching career ==
After retirement in 1996, Klipa joined a youth system of Beopetrol as the U19 head coach. In February 2000, he became the head coach of Beopetrol of the YUBA League for the rest of the 1999–2000 season. In summer 2000, he was named the U19 head coach for FMP Železnik. He coached the FMP Železnik U19 team until 2008.

Klipa had two stints as head coach for FMP of the Basketball League of Serbia and the ABA League. On 14 January 2008, Klipa became the FMP head coach after Vlada Vukoičić got fired. On 10 December 2008, Klipa parted ways with FMP. Afterwards, in July 2008, Klipa become the head coach of FMP for the second time. He left FMP on 28 October 2009.

On 26 July 2010, Klipa was named the head coach for the Bosnian team Igokea. He had a 11–15 record in the 2010–11 ABA NLB League season. Klipa resigned as the Igokea head coach on 26 May 2011. The resignation came after two losts to Široki TT Kabeli in the 2011 Bosnian Championship Finals.

In 2012, Klipa was named the head coach for the Crvena zvezda Youth.

In August 2015, Klipa was named the head coach for FMP. In January 2016, he won the 2016 Cup of Serbia. During the 2015–16 BLS season, Klipa had a 24–2 record in the First League and a 6–2 record in the Super League. His team lost to Partizan in the semifinals. On 20 November 2016, Klipa parted ways with FMP.

In November 2016, Klipa rejoined the Crvena zvezda youth system as the U19 head coach. After serving the 2021–22 season as a youth system coordinator, Klipa rejoined the under-19 team as a head coach on 17 August 2022.

In November 2022, Slipa was hired as the U-19 head coach for Chinese team Qingdao.

=== Youth national teams ===
Klipa was an assistant coach for the Yugoslavia national U-20 team at the 2000 FIBA Europe Under-20 Championship in Ohrid, Macedonia.

Klipa was the head coach for the Serbia national U-20 team that won the gold medal at the 2008 FIBA Europe Under-20 Championship in Riga, Latvia. The team was led by talented cast of Miroslav Raduljica, Boban Marjanović, and Milan Mačvan. In the next year, he also coached the team at the 2009 FIBA Europe Under-20 Championship in Greece, finishing 11th.

In 2009, Klipa coached the Serbia national team at the Mediterranean Games in Pescara, Italy.

Klipa was the head coach for the Serbia national U18 team at the 2015 FIBA Europe Under-18 Championship in Volos, Greece, finishing 5th. Four years later, he coached the team at the 2019 FIBA Europe Under-18 Championship in Volos, finishing 10th.

Klipa was the head coach for the Serbia under-16 team that won the bronze medal at the 2017 FIBA U16 European Championship in Podgorica, Montenegro.
