= Marko Radonjić =

Serbian basketball player

Personal information
- Born: 6 February 1993 (age 33) Kruševac, Serbia, FR Yugoslavia
- Listed height: 1.91 m (6 ft 3 in)
- Listed weight: 90 kg (198 lb)

Career information
- NBA draft: 2015: undrafted
- Playing career: 2011–2023
- Position: Point guard
- Number: 13, 22, 31

Career history
- 2011–2014: Napredak Rubin
- 2014–2015: Sloga
- 2015: Vojvodina Srbijagas
- 2015–2017: Borac Čačak
- 2017–2018: Iskra Svit
- 2018: Dynamic
- 2018–2019: Novi Pazar
- 2019–2020: Balkan Botevgrad
- 2020–2022: FMP
- 2022–2023: Borac Čačak

Career highlights
- Serbian League Cup winner (2019)

Marko Radonjić (Serbian Cyrillic: Марко Радоњић, born 6 February 1993) is a former Serbian professional basketball player.

== Professional career ==
On 18 April 2018, Radonjić signed for Dynamic. In August 2018, he signed for OKK Novi Pazar.

On 21 July 2020, Radonjić signed a two-year contract with FMP.

In July 2022, Radonjić signed with Borac Čačak for the 2022–23 season.

== National team career ==
Radonjić was a member of the Serbia national under-17 team that placed 5th at the 2010 FIBA Under-17 World Championship. Over eight tournament games, he averaged 5.8 points, 2.5 rebounds and 1.4 assists per game.
