= Pools Smederevo SRC =

- Pools Smederevo
- Interactive map of Pools Smederevo SRC
- Full name: Pools Smederevo Sports and Recreation Complex
- Address: Smederevo, Serbia
- Coordinates: 44°39′35.36″N 20°55′48.77″E
- Capacity: 7,000
- Pool size: 22 m × 50 m (72 ft × 164 ft)

Construction
- Opened: 20 July 2010

Pools Smederevo Sports and Recreation Complex (Pools Smederevo SRC; Serbian: Спортско-рекреативни комплекс Базени Смедерево (СРК Базени Смедерево) / Sportsko-rekreativni kompleks Bazeni Smederevo (SRK Bazeni Smederevo); sometimes short Pools Smederevo, Serbian: Базени Смедерево / Bazeni Smederevo) is a swimming pool complex in Smederevo, Serbia. The complex is in the Smederevo SC. It consists of an Olympic pool, dimensions 22x50 m, and two smaller pools for children and non-swimmers. The Olympic pool meets all FINA standards and is equipped with technology that meets the stringent requirements international swimming events. The capacity of the complex is 7,000 seats.

== International matches ==
Serbia national water polo team is on this pool played one game.

| # | Date | Competition | Opponent | Score | Att. | Ref |
|---|---|---|---|---|---|---|
Serbia (2006–)
| 1. | 16 June 2015 | Friendly match | Russia | 12–5 | 5,000 | |

== See also ==
- Smederevo Hall
