= Đukan Đukanović =

Serbian basketball player

No. 8 – Metalac Valjevo
- Position: Point guard
- League: Serbian League

Personal information
- Born: October 31, 1992 (age 34) Valjevo, SR Serbia, Yugoslavia
- Listed height: 1.83 m (6 ft 0 in)
- Listed weight: 80 kg (176 lb)

Career information
- NBA draft: 2014: undrafted
- Playing career: 2008–present

Career history
- 2008–2014: Metalac Valjevo
- 2014–2015: Kolín
- 2015–2016: Hopsi Polzela
- 2016–2019: Metalac Valjevo
- 2019: Força Lleida
- 2020: Čelik
- 2020–2021: Pirot
- 2021–2022: Kumanovo
- 2022: Prievidza
- 2022–2023: Borac Zemun
- 2023: Sloboda Tuzla
- 2023–2024: Hopsi Polzela
- 2024–2025: Ibar
- 2025: Šušanj
- 2025–present: Metalac Valjevo

Career highlights
- 2× Serbian First League MVP (2018, 2019)

Đukan Đukanović (Serbian Cyrillic: Ђукан Ђукановић, born October 31, 1992) is a Serbian professional basketball player and the team captain for Metalac Valjevo of the Serbian League (KLS).

== Playing career ==
Đukanović started his playing career with his hometown team Metalac. He also played for Kolín (Czech Republic) and Hopsi Polzela (Slovenia). In 2016, he came bach to Metalac. He was selected the Serbian First League MVP in the 2017–18 season.

On February 27, 2019, Đukanović signed for Força Lleida of the Spanish LEB Oro. He averaged 2.6 points, 1.6 rebounds and 2.1 assists per game.

On September 10, 2020, Đukanović signed with Čelik of the Bosnian Championship. On July 3, 2021, he signed with Kumanovo of the Macedonian First League.
