= Marko Dujković =

Macedonian basketball player

Çair 2030
- Position: Center
- League: Macedonian Second League

Personal information
- Born: March 21, 1990 (age 36) Kumanovo, SR Macedonia, SFR Yugoslavia
- Listed height: 2.26 m (7 ft 5 in)

Career information
- NBA draft: 2012: undrafted
- Playing career: 2010–present

Career history
- 2010–2014: Metalac Valjevo
- 2014: Bosna
- 2014–2015: Olimpi Tbilisi
- 2016–2017: Metalac Valjevo
- 2017: Blokotehna
- 2018: Byblos
- 2018: Al Rayyan
- 2018: Al-Ittihad
- 2018: Beijing Eastern Bucks
- 2018: Byblos
- 2019: Al Morog
- 2019: Nizwa
- 2020: WA Boufarik
- 2020: Dalia Sportive de Grombalia
- 2020–2021: Vardar
- 2021-present: Çair 2030

Marko Dujković (Macedonian: Марко Дујковиќ; born March 21, 1990) is a Macedonian professional basketball player who plays for Kb Çair 2030 of the Macedonian Second League. He is also a member of the Macedonian national team.
