= Aleksandar Vasić (basketball) =

Serbian basketball player

Personal information
- Born: June 17, 1987 (age 39) Valjevo, SR Serbia, SFR Yugoslavia
- Listed height: 1.85 m (6 ft 1 in)

Career information
- NBA draft: 2009: undrafted
- Playing career: 2008–2020
- Position: Shooting guard

Career history
- 2008–2011: OKK Beograd
- 2011–2013: Sloboda Užice
- 2013–2014: Tamiš
- 2014–2015: Karpoš Sokoli
- 2015–2016: Team FOG Næstved
- 2016–2020: Metalac Valjevo

Aleksandar Vasić (born June 17, 1987) is a Serbian former professional basketball player.
