= Radoš Šešlija =

Serbian basketball player

No. 15 – Metalac
- Position: Center
- League: Bosnian Championship; Second ABA League

Personal information
- Born: 4 February 1992 (age 34) Belgrade, SR Serbia, SFR Yugoslavia
- Listed height: 2.08 m (6 ft 10 in)
- Listed weight: 102 kg (225 lb)

Career information
- NBA draft: 2014: undrafted
- Playing career: 2009–present

Career history
- 2009–2011: Novi Sad
- 2011–2015: Vojvodina Srbijagas
- 2015–2021: FMP
- 2022 - present: Metalac Valjevo

Radoš Šešlija (Serbian Cyrillic: Радош Шешлија; born 4 February 1992) is a Serbian professional basketball player for Borac Banja Luka of the Championship of Bosnia and Herzegovina and the Second ABA League.

== Professional career ==
On 8 September 2021, he signed for Borac Banja Luka.
