= Teodor Atanasov =

Macedonian basketball player

Personal information
- Born: June 2, 1996 (age 30) Novi Sad, FR Yugoslavia
- Listed height: 2.06 m (6 ft 9 in)

Career information
- Playing career: 2014–present
- Position: Center

Career history
- 2014–2019: Vojvodina
- 2019: Aloe Plus Lanzarote Conejeros
- 2019–2020: Kumanovo
- 2020–2021: Akademija FMP
- 2021: EuroNickel

Teodor Atanasov (Serbian Cyrillic: Теодор Атанасов; born June 2, 1996) is a Serbian professional basketball player. He also holds Macedonian citizenship.

== Playing career ==
Atanasov played for the Zemun U18 team for the 2013–14 season. In 2014, he joined Vojvodina.

In January 2019, Atanasov joined Aloe Plus Lanzarote Conejeros of the Spanish 4th-tier Liga EBA for the rest of the season.
