= Ivan Žigeranović =

Serbian basketball player

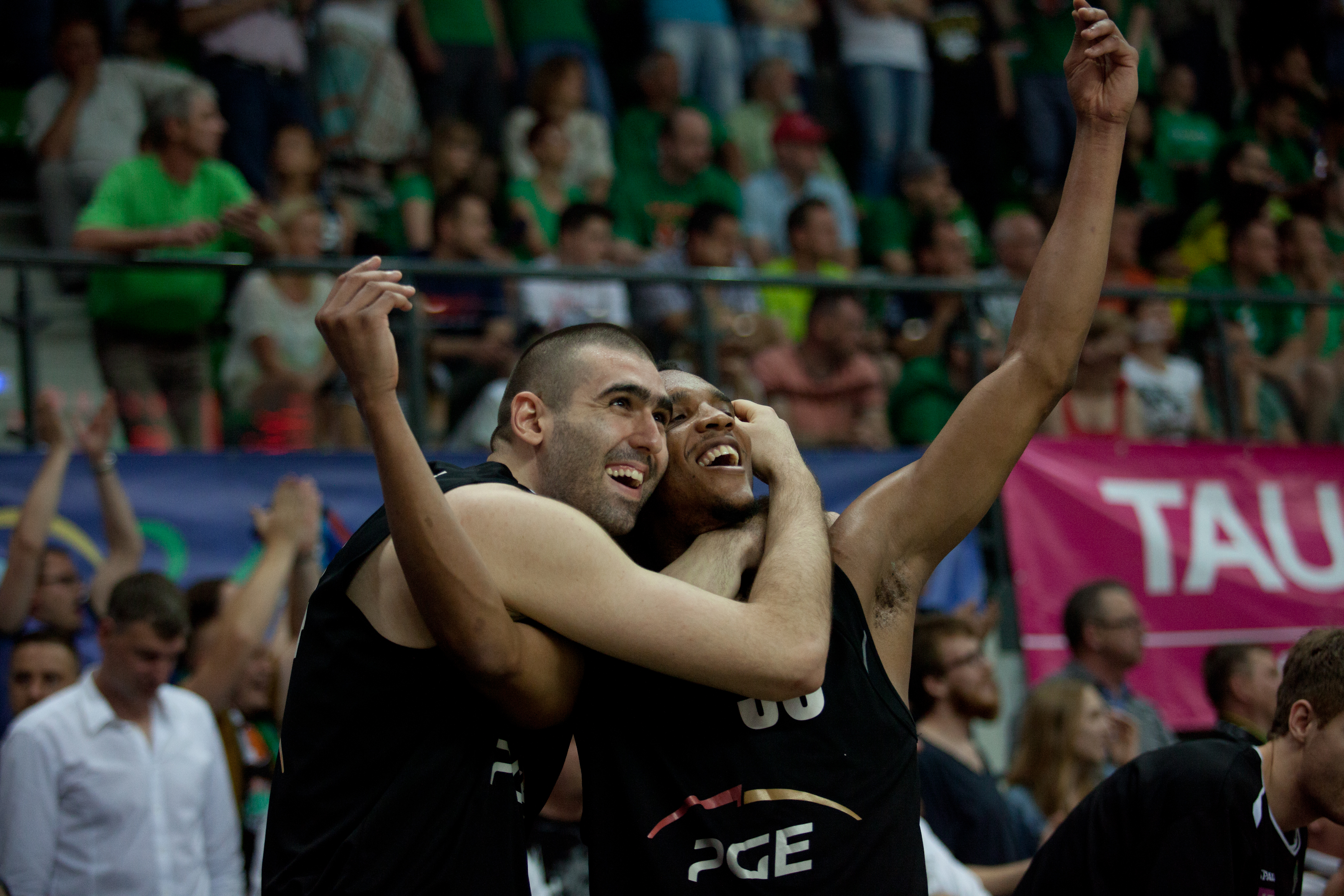
- Žigeranović (left) in 2014

Radnički Obrenovac
- Position: Center

Personal information
- Born: 14 August 1984 (age 42) Negotin, SFR Yugoslavia
- Listed height: 2.12 m (6 ft 11 in)
- Listed weight: 120 kg (265 lb)

Career information
- NBA draft: 2006: undrafted
- Playing career: 2002–present

Career history
- 2002–2006: Ergonom
- 2004–2005: → Prokuplje
- 2006–2008: FMP Železnik
- 2008–2009: Borac Čačak
- 2009–2010: Gaz Metan Mediaş
- 2010–2011: Turów Zgorzelec
- 2011: Borac Čačak
- 2012: Gaz Metan Mediaş
- 2012–2015: Turów Zgorzelec
- 2015: Asesoft Ploiești
- 2015–2016: U-BT Cluj-Napoca
- 2016: Borac Čačak
- 2016–2018: Falco KC Szombathely
- 2018–present: KK Radnički Obrenovac

Career highlights
- Polish League champion (2014)

Ivan Žigeranović (Serbian: Иван Жигерановић; born 14 August 1984) is a Serbian professional basketball player for KK Radnički Obrenovac from Serbia. Standing at 2.12 m (6 ft 11 1/2 in), he plays at the center position.

== Professional career ==
Žigeranović started his playing career in 2002 in the Basketball League of Serbia team Ergonom. He then moved to FMP Železnik in 2006 and stayed for two seasons in the club. With them, he won the Radivoj Korać Cup in 2007. After that, he spent one season playing for Borac Čačak.

In 2009, he moved abroad for the first time in his career, playing one season for the Romanian team Gaz Metan Mediaş. In the summer of 2010, he signed a one-year contract with the Polish team Turów Zgorzelec. After that period, he had short stints in his former teams, Borac Čačak and Gaz Metan Mediaş.

On 3 July 2012 he signed a one-year deal with his former team Turów Zgorzelec. He won the Polish League in the season 2013–14. In June 2013, he extended his contract with the club for two more seasons. In February 2015, he left Turow and signed with Asesoft Ploiești for the rest of the season.

On 18 June 2015, he signed a 1+1 deal with U-BT Cluj-Napoca.
