= Aleksandar Andrejević (basketball) =

Serbian basketball player (born 1991)

CB Peñas Huesca
- Position: Center
- League: LEB Oro

Personal information
- Born: February 13, 1991 (age 35) SR Serbia, SFR Yugoslavia
- Listed height: 2.12 m (6 ft 11 in)

Career information
- NBA draft: 2013: undrafted
- Playing career: 2007–present

Career history
- 2007–2008: Zdravlje Actavis
- 2008–2009: FMP
- 2009–2010: BKK Radnički
- 2011–2013: Mladost Zemun
- 2013–2015: Cherno More
- 2015–2016: Strumica
- 2016: Kumanovo
- 2016: Spartak Subotica
- 2016–2018: Ibar Rozaje
- 2018: Riviera Basket
- 2018–2019: Zdravlje
- 2019: AV Ohrid
- 2019–2020: Leotar
- 2020–2021: Kumanovo
- 2021–present: CB Peñas Huesca

Aleksandar Andrejević (born February 13, 1991) is a Serbian professional basketball player for CB Peñas Huesca of the LEB Oro.

Andrejević spent the 2020–21 season with Kumanovo of the Macedonian First League. He averaged 12.4 points, 7.7 rebounds, and 1.1 assists per game. On September 28, 2021, Andrejević signed with CB Peñas Huesca.
