= 2014–15 Basketball Cup of Serbia =

2014–15 Cup of Serbia
- Season: 2014–15
- Games played: 7
- Teams: 8

Finals
- Champions: Vršac Swisslion
- Runners-up: Borac

The 2014–15 Basketball Cup of Serbia is the 9th season of the Serbian 2nd-tier men's cup tournament.

Vršac-based team Vršac Swisslion won the Cup.

== Bracket ==
Quarterfinals
Plana Hardex | 79
Zdravlje | 75
Akademik | 63
Vršac Swisslion | 83
Mladost SP | 75
Borac | 88
Milan Trivić | 62
FMP | 110

Semifinals
Plana Hardex | 71
Vršac Swisslion | 88
Borac | 89
FMP | 72

Final
23 December 2014; Vršac
Vršac Swisslion | 93
Borac | 88

Source: Basketball Federation of Serbia

== See also ==
- 2014–15 Radivoj Korać Cup
- 2014–15 Basketball League of Serbia
