= 2015–16 Basketball Cup of Serbia =

2015–16 Cup of Serbia
- Season: 2015–16
- Duration: November 25, 2015 – January 19, 2016
- Games played: 11
- Teams: 12

Finals
- Champions: FMP
- Runners-up: Vršac Swisslion

The 2015–16 Basketball Cup of Serbia is the 10th season of the Serbian 2nd-tier men's cup tournament.

Belgrade-based team FMP won the Cup.

== Bracket ==
First round
Dynamic BG	70
Zdravlje	69
Mladost Veternik	77
Plana	79
Radnički 1950	86
Mladost SP	81
Dunav	54
FMP	61

Quarterfinals
Zlatibor	76
Borac	89
Kolubara LA 2003	67
Vršac Swisslion	91
Dynamic BG	99
Plana	75
Radnički 1950	62
FMP	69

Semifinals
Borac	82
Vršac Swisslion	90
Dynamic BG	82
FMP	88

Final
19 January 2016; Vršac
Vršac Swisslion	61
FMP	75

Source: Basketball Federation of Serbia

== See also ==
- 2015–16 Radivoj Korać Cup
- 2015–16 Basketball League of Serbia
