= KK Sveti Đorđe =

Basketball club in Žitište, Serbia

Sveti Đorđe
- Nickname: Sveci (Saints)
- Leagues: First Regional League of Serbia
- Founded: 1979; 47 years ago
- History: KK Plastika (1979–1999); KK Žitište (1999–2001); KK Sveti Đorđe (2001–present)
- Arena: Sveti Sava ES Hall
- Location: Žitište, Serbia
- Team colors: White and Red
- President: Nikola Pešut
- Head coach: Nenad Vignjević
- Website: kksvetidjordje.com

Košarkaški klub Sveti Đorđe (Serbian Cyrillic: Кошаркашки клуб Свети Ђорђе), commonly referred to as KK Sveti Đorđe, is a men's professional basketball club based in Žitište, Serbia. They are currently competing in the First Regional League of Serbia (3rd-tier).

The club was founded in 1979 and renamed in 2001 after Saint George. The club has its own Hall of Fame, where the members are Drago Radinović, Zoran Veselinov and Nikola Pešut.

== History ==
In the 2018–19 Cup of Serbia, Sveti Đorđe as a 3rd-tier league member won over Zdravlje (2nd-tier league member) in the quarterfinals and over Vojvodina (1st-tier league member) in the semifinals. Those wins took them to the 2019 Cup of Serbia Final and qualifies to the 2019 Radivoj Korać Cup. Sveti Đorđe lost from Novi Pazar in the Cup of Serbia Final.

== Coaches ==
- (Socialist Federal Republic of Yugoslavia) Dušan Radojčić
- (Serbia) Nebojša Vidić
- (Serbia) Marko Boljac (2017–2019)
- (Serbia) Nenad Vignjević (2019–present)

== Trophies and awards ==
=== Trophies ===
- Cup of Serbia (2nd-tier)
  - Runners-up: 2018–19
- Radivoj Korać Cup
  - Quarterfinals: 2019
