= Miloš Pejić =

Serbian basketball player and coach

Kesatria Bengawan Solo
- Title: Head coach
- League: IBL

Personal information
- Born: 22 October 1968 (age 58) Vrnjačka Banja, Yugoslavia
- Listed height: 2.01 m (6 ft 7 in)

Career information
- NBA draft: 1990: undrafted
- Playing career: 1982–2001
- Position: Small forward
- Number: 4
- Coaching career: 2002–present

Career history

Coaching
- 2002–2006: Mašinac
- 2006–2008: Sloga
- 2008–2009: Borac Banja Luka
- 2009–2010: Sloga
- 2010–2013: Radnički FMP
- 2013–2014: Iran U18
- 2014–2015: Kožuv
- 2015–2016: Vršac Swisslion
- 2016–2017: Lovćen 1947
- 2018: Bosna
- 2019: Vera Tbilisi
- 2019–2022: Satria Muda Pertamina
- 2022–2024: Indonesia
- 2025-present: Kesatria Bengawan Solo

Career highlights
- 2× Serbian League Cup winner (2011, 2012); IBL champion (2021); Indonesia President Cup champion (2019); Georgian A-Liga champion (2019); Republika Srpska Cup winner (2009)
Medals
Men's basketball
Head Coach for Indonesia
Southeast Asian Games
Gold medal – first place	2021 Vietnam	Team
Head Coach for Iran
FIBA Asia Under-18 Championship
Silver medal – second place	2014 Qatar	U18 Team
Assistant Coach for Serbia
U20 European Championship
Gold medal – first place	2007 Italy / Slovenia	Team

Miloš Pejić (Serbian Cyrillic: Милош Пејић; born 22 October 1968) is a Serbian professional basketball coach and former player, and the coach for the Indonesia men's national basketball team

== Coaching career ==
Pejić coached Mašinac, Sloga and Radnički FMP of the Basketball League of Serbia. On April 18, 2008, Pejić became a head coach for the Borac Banja Luka after Slobodan Nikolić got fired. In January 2009, he parted ways with Borac.

During the 2014–15 season, Pejić coached the Gevgelija-based team Kožuv of the Macedonian First League and the Balkan International Basketball League.

In November 2015, Pejić became a head coach for the Vršac Swisslion. Prior to start of 2016–17 season, Pejić was named as a head coach for the Lovćen 1947 of the Montenegrin League.

In January 2018, Pejić was named head coach for KK Bosna of the Basketball Championship of Bosnia and Herzegovina. He left Bosnia in March 2018.

During the 2018–19 season, Pejić coached the Tbilisi-based team BC Vera of the Georgian A-Liga (2nd tier).

In October 2019, Pejić became a head coach for Satria Muda Pertamina of the Indonesian Basketball League.

== Career achievements ==
- Indonesian Basketball League champion: 1 (with Satria Muda Pertamina: 2021)
- Georgian A-Liga champion: 1 (with Vera Tbilisi: 2018–19)
- Serbian League Cup winner: 2 (with Radnički Basket/Radnički FMP: 2010–11, 2011–12)
- Republika Srpska Cup winner: 1 (with Borac Banja Luka: 2008–09)
