= KK Crnokosa =

Basketball club in Kosjerić, Serbia

- Nickname: Skakavci (Locusts)
- Leagues: First Regional League
- Founded: 1982; 43 years ago
- History: KK Crnokosa; 1982–present
- Arena: Kosjerić Sports Hall
- Capacity: 1000
- Location: Kosjerić, Serbia
- Team colors: Gray and Blue

Košarkaški klub Crnokosa (Serbian Cyrillic: Кошаркашки клуб Црнокоса) is a men's professional basketball club based in Kosjerić, Serbia. The club currently plays in the First Regional Basketball League.

== History ==
It was founded in 1982 and has won no championships since then.

== Coaches ==
Petar Štulić

== See also ==
- 2013–14 Basketball League of Serbia
