= Smederevo Hall =

Indoor arena in Smederevo, Serbia

- Interactive map of Smederevo Hall
- Full name: Smederevo Hall
- Location: Smederevo, Serbia
- Coordinates: 44°39′37.8″N 20°55′51.6″E
- Owner: City of Smederevo
- Operator: J.P. Sportski centar Smederevo
- Capacity: 2,300 (handball and futsal); 2,800 – with additional telescopic stands (boxing, basketball and volleyball); 4,500 (concerts)

Construction
- Opened: June 2009

Tenants
- KK Smederevo 1953; KK Mega Vizura (2013–2014); KMF Smederevo; OK Smederevo Carina; RK Smederevo

Smederevo Hall (Serbian: Дворана Смедерево / Dvorana Smederevo) is an indoor arena in Smederevo, Serbia. It was finished in June 2009, for 2009 Summer Universiade. The hall is located within the Smederevo SC. It is the home arena of domestic KK Smederevo 1953, OK Smederevo Carina, RK Smederevo as well as other sports clubs from Smederevo. In the 2013/2014 season the arena was a home of basketball club KK Mega Vizura, who played in the regional ABA League. Sports Hall has possibilities for various sports events alongside basketball, futsal, volleyball, handball, table tennis and martial arts, there is a bowling alley and indoor shooting range.

== See also ==
- List of indoor arenas in Serbia
- Pools Smederevo SRC
