= Bojan Bakić =

Montenegrin basketball player

Personal information
- Born: January 8, 1983 (age 43) Titograd, SFR Yugoslavia
- Listed height: 1.97 m (6 ft 6 in)

Career information
- NBA draft: 2005: undrafted
- Playing career: 1997–present
- Position: Shooting guard
- Number: 10

Career history
- 1997–2003: Budućnost Podgorica
- 2003–2007: Hemofarm
- 2007–2008: Budućnost Podgorica
- 2008: Maroussi
- 2008–2009: Czarni Słupsk
- 2010: Trikala 2000
- 2010: Metalac Valjevo
- 2010: Kryvbasbasket
- 2011: VEF Rīga
- 2011: Ventspils
- 2012: Metalac Valjevo
- 2012: Hemofarm
- 2012–2014: Metalac Valjevo
- 2015–2018: BC Kolín
- 2018–2019: BC Barsy Atyrau

Career highlights
- Adriatic League champion (2005); Latvian League champion (2011); YUBA League champion (1999, 2000, 2001); Yugoslav Cup winner (2001)
Medals
Men's basketball
Representing (Federal Republic of Yugoslavia) FR Yugoslavia
European Championship for Cadets
Gold medal – first place	1999 Slovenia	Yugoslavia u-16
Gold medal – first place	2000 A.S. Tournament	Yugoslavia u-18

Bojan Bakić (Serbian Cyrillic: Бојан Бакић; born January 8, 1983) is a Montenegrin professional basketball player for Barsy Atyrau of the Kazakhstan Basketball Championship.

== Professional career ==
The Montenegrin guard started his professional career with Budućnost Podgorica in 2000 and remained there for three consecutive seasons. In 2003, Bakić signed with Hemofarm. With Hemofarm, he had an excellent 2004–05 season, winning the Adriatic League and was also named Eurobasket.com All-Serbia and Montenegro League Most Improved Player of the Year. However, he missed the entire 2005–06 season due to injury and played very little in the following season. He returned to Budućnost Podgorica in the 2007–08 season. In 2008, he also played for Maroussi in Greece.

In the 2008–09 season, Bakić moved to Poland and signed with Czarni Słupsk, where he reached the PLK semifinals and was also named Eurobasket.com Polish League All-Bosman Team. In January 2010, he signed with Trikala 2000 of the Greek Basket League. Until the end of the 2009–10 season, he also played for Metalac Valjevo in Serbia, averaging 12.9 points, 2.4 rebounds and 1.7 assists in 14 games. He started the 2010–11 season in Ukraine at Kryvbasbasket, playing 21 games with 14.8 points, 3.6 rebounds and 1.6 assists per contest. He also played for the Latvian team VEF Rīga. He started the 2011–12 season with Ventspils. In January 2012, Bakić moved back to Metalac Valjevo, averaging 24.3 points, 4.4 rebounds and 2.9 assists. He also played for Hemofarm until the end of the 2011–12 season, averaging 13.5 points, 2.1 rebounds and 3.0 assists.

== National team career ==
Bakić won the gold medal at the 1999 FIBA Europe Under-16 Championship with the Yugoslav national team.
