= Milovan Stepandić =

Serbian basketball coach (1954–2020)

Personal information
- Born: 18 December 1954 Šabac, PR Serbia, FPR Yugoslavia
- Died: 15 January 2020 (aged 65) Belgrade, Serbia
- Coaching career: 1977–2015

Career history

Coaching
- 1980–1990: OKK / Zorka Šabac
- 1990: Slavonka Osijek
- 1991: Srem
- 1991–1996: Iva Zorka Šabac
- 1996–1997: Budućnost
- 1997–1998: Iva Zorka Šabac
- 1998–2000: Borac Čačak
- 2000–2002: NIS Vojvodina
- 2002–2003: Lavovi 063
- 2003–2004: Vojvodina (women's team)
- 2004: Swisslion Vršac
- 2005–2008: Borac Čačak
- 2008–2009: FMP
- 2009–2010, 2010–2011, 2013: Metalac
- 2013–2015: OKK Beograd

Milovan Stepandić (Serbian Cyrillic: Милован Степандић; 18 December 1954 – 15 January 2020) was a Serbian professional basketball coach.

== Coaching career ==
Stepandić coached Budućnost, Iva Zorka Šabac, Borac Čačak and NIS Vojvodina of the YUBA League.

On 30 July 2004 Stepandić became a head coach for the Swisslion Vršac.

From 2009 to 2013, Stepandić had three stints with Metalac of the Basketball League of Serbia.
