= KK FMP =

Basketball club in Belgrade, Serbia

FMP Beograd
- Nickname: Panteri (Panthers)
- Leagues: ABA League; Basketball League of Serbia
- Founded: 1970; 56 years ago
- History: List: KK Radnički 1970–2009 KK Radnički Basket 2009–2011 KK Radnički FMP 2011–2013 KK FMP 2013–present
- Arena: Železnik Hall
- Capacity: 3,000
- Location: Serbia: Novi Sad (1970–2009); Belgrade (2009–present)
- Team colors: Red and White
- President: Zoran Tošković
- Head coach: Saša Nikitović
- Team captain: Filip Barna
- Website: kkfmp.rs
| Home | Away |

Košarkaški klub FMP (Serbian Cyrillic: Кошаркашки клуб ФMП), commonly referred to as KK FMP, is a men's professional basketball club based in Belgrade, Serbia. The club plays in the ABA League, the Basketball League of Serbia, and the Basketball Champions League. Their home arena is the Železnik Hall.

The club was founded in Novi Sad in 1970 as KK Radnički, and was later relocated to Belgrade. The club considers itself as the successor of the 'original' FMP.

== History ==
=== The Radnički era (1970–2013) ===
==== 1970–2009: Based in Novi Sad ====
KK Radnički Novi Sad

The club was formed in 1970 as KK Radnički from Novi Sad. The club had played in regional leagues until 2006, when new sponsors on board, Invest Inženjering and Park Hotel. The club moved to the top-tier Serbian League in 2007 and played in that competition in their last two seasons (2007–08 and 2008–09). During the 2008–09 season, guard Zlatko Bolić led the league with 22.8 points per game.

==== 2009–2013: Based in Belgrade ====
In 2009, Radnički was relocated to Belgrade and changed its name to KK Radnički Basket to distinguish it from well-known Radnički Belgrade. Two years later, the club changed its name to KK Radnički FMP.

=== FMP (2013–present) ===
In the 2016–17 season, FMP made a debut in the ABA League and finished in 9th place in the end of the season. Power forward Jonah Bolden was awarded the ABA League Top Prospect title after averaging 12.9 points and 7.2 rebounds per game in his rookie season.

In December 2020, the club became a shareholder of the Adriatic Basketball Association, following a transfer of shares from Metalac Valjevo. On 18 November 2021, the club changed its name to FMP Meridian for the 2021–22 season due to sponsorship reasons. In June 2022, FMP confirmed to join the Basketball Champions League for the 2022–23 season, hosting a qualifying round in Belgrade.

=== Names of the club ===
| Year | Name | Location |
|---|---|---|
| 1970–2009 | KK Radnički | Novi Sad |
| 2009–2011 | KK Radnički Basket | Belgrade |
| 2011–2013 | KK Radnički FMP | Belgrade |
| 2013–present | KK FMP | Belgrade |

== Sponsorship naming ==
The club has had several denominations through the years due to its sponsorship:

- Radnički Invest Inženjering (2006–2009)
- FMP Meridian (2021–2024)
- FMP Soccerbet (2024–2025)

== Logos ==
1970–2009

2011–2013

2013–present

== Home arenas ==
- SPC Vojvodina, Novi Sad (2006–2009)
- Belgrade Basket City, Belgrade (2009–2011)
- Železnik Hall, Belgrade (2011–present)

== Players ==
=== Current roster ===
Note: Flags indicate national team eligibility at FIBA-sanctioned events. Players may hold other non-FIBA nationalities not displayed.

FMP roster
Players
Coaches

| Pos. | No. | Nat. | Name | Ht. | Age |
|---|---|---|---|---|---|
| F/C | 0 | (Serbia) | Rebrača, Filip | 2.06 m (6 ft 9 in) | 29 – 3 September 1997 |
| G | 2 | (United States) | Scott, Joshua | 1.85 m (6 ft 1 in) | 28 – 19 January 1998 |
| G | 5 | (United States) | Eugene, Christyon | 1.91 m (6 ft 3 in) | 25 – 15 March 2001 |
| G | 7 | (Serbia) | Zimonjić, Bogdan | 1.96 m (6 ft 5 in) | 23 – 27 January 2003 |
| SG | 8 | (Serbia) | Grojić, Petar | 1.96 m (6 ft 5 in) | 25 – 6 March 2001 |
| F | 11 | (Serbia) | Radosavljević, Dušan | 2.03 m (6 ft 8 in) | 25 – 3 November 2001 |
| F | 12 | (Serbia) | Vučković, Marko | 1.98 m (6 ft 6 in) | 21 – 25 June 2005 |
| C | 14 | (Serbia) | Gašić, Nikola | 2.13 m (7 ft 0 in) | 24 – 17 November 2001 |
| C | 15 | (Nigeria) | Ojiako, John | 2.08 m (6 ft 10 in) | 26 – 15 June 2000 |
| PF | 22 | (Serbia) | Stanojević, Aleksa | 2.04 m (6 ft 8 in) | 20 – 2 September 2006 |
| C | 33 | (Serbia) | Ostojić, Petar | 2.11 m (6 ft 11 in) | 19 – 4 May 2007 |

Head coach

- (Serbia) Saša Nikitović

Legend

- (C) Team captain
- (L) On loan
- Injured

- Roster
Updated: 8 November 2025

=== Depth chart ===
| Pos. | Starting 5 | Bench 1 | Bench 2 | Bench 3 |
|---|---|---|---|---|
| C | John Ojiako | Nikola Gašić | | Petar Ostojić |
| PF | Filip Rebrača | Aleksa Stanojević |
| SF | | Dušan Radosavljević | Vučković |
| SG | | Petar Grojić | Bogdan Zimonjić |
| PG | Joshua Scott | Christyon Eugene |

== Coaches ==
Radnički Novi Sad (1970–2009)

- (Serbia) Mladen Mikić (2006–2008)
- (Serbia) Velislav Vesković (2008–2009)

Radnički Basket/Radnički FMP (2009–2013)

- (Serbia) Dragan Vaščanin (2009)
- (Serbia) Boško Đokić (2009–2010)
- (Serbia) Miloš Pejić (2010–2013)

FMP (2013–present)

- (Serbia) Milan Gurović (2013–2015)
- (Serbia) Slobodan Klipa (2015–2016)
- (Serbia) Branko Maksimović (2016–2017)
- (Serbia) Dušan Alimpijević (2017)
- (Serbia) Vladimir Jovanović (2017–2020)
- (Serbia) Bojan Đerić (2020–2021)
- (Serbia) Vanja Guša (2021)
- (Serbia) Nenad Stefanović (2021–2023)
- (Serbia) Stevan Mijović (2023–2024)
- (Serbia) Saša Nikitović (2025–present)

== Season-by-season ==
| Season | Tier | Division | Pos. | Postseason | W–L | National Cup | Adriatic competitions | | | European competitions | | |
|---|---|---|---|---|---|---|---|---|---|---|---|---|
Radnički Novi Sad
| 2006–07 | 2 | BLS B League | 1 | None | 21–5 | DNQ | — | | | — | | |
| 2007–08 | 1 | BLS First League | 9 | DNQ | 9–13 | DNQ | — | | | — | | |
| 2008–09 | 1 | BLS First League | 9 | DNQ | 12–14 | DNQ | — | | | — | | |
Radnički Basket
| 2009–10 | 1 | BLS First League | 12 | DNQ | 9–17 | Quarterfinalist | — | | | — | | |
| 2010–11 | 2 | Second League | 2 | None | 15–4 | Quarterfinalist | — | | | — | | |
Radnički FMP
| 2011–12 | 1 | BLS First League | 3 | SL 5th | 22–18 | Quarterfinalist | — | | | — | | |
| 2012–13 | 1 | BLS First League | 7 | DNQ | 14–12 | DNQ | — | | | — | | |
FMP
| 2013–14 | 1 | BLS First League | 1 | SL 5th | 25–15 | Semifinalist | — | | | — | | |
| 2014–15 | 1 | BLS First League | 1 | SL 6th | 23–13 | Quarterfinalist | — | | | — | | |
| 2015–16 | 1 | BLS First League | 1 | Semifinalist | 29–6 | Quarterfinalist | — | | | — | | |
| 2016–17 | 1 | BLS Super League | 3 | Runners up | 11–8 | Semifinalist | ABA League | 9 | 10–16 | — | | |
| 2017–18 | 1 | BLS Super League | B1 | Runners up | 13–5 | Semifinalist | ABA 1st League | 8 | 9–13 | — | | |
| 2018–19 | 1 | BLS Super League | A2 | Semifinalist | 9–4 | Semifinalist | ABA 1st League | 6 | 10–12 | — | | |
| 2019–20 | 1 | BLS Super League | Abandoned | | | Semifinalist | ABA 1st League | Ab | 10–11 | — | | |
| 2020–21 | 1 | BLS Super League | NH | Quarterfinalist | 0–2 | Quarterfinalist | ABA 1st League | 8 | 11–15 | — | | |
| 2021–22 | 1 | BLS Super League | NH | Runners up | 0–2 | Semifinalist | ABA 1st League | 6 | 14–14 | — | | |
| 2022–23 | 1 | BLS Super League | NH | Runners up | 0–2 | Semifinalist | ABA 1st League | Quarterfinals | 1–2 | Champions League | QR | 2–1 |
| 2023–24 | 1 | BLS Super League | NH | Semifinalist | 0–2 | Quarterfinalist | ABA 1st League | 11 | 10–16 | Champions League | QR | 0–1 |
| 2024–25 | 1 | BLS Super League | NH | Semifinalist | 1–2 | Semifinalist | ABA 1st League | 10 | 14–16 | Champions League | GS | 1–5 |

== Trophies and awards ==
=== Trophies ===
- Serbian League
  - Runners-up (3): 2016–17, 2017–18, 2021–22
- Serbian B League (2nd-tier)
  - Winner (1): 2006–07
  - Runners-up (1): 2010–11
- Radivoj Korać Cup

- Semifinals (4): 2014, 2017, 2018, 2019

- League Cup of Serbia (2nd-tier)
  - Winner (4): 2009–10, 2010–11, 2011–12, 2015–16
  - Runners-up (2): 2012–13, 2013–14

Since 2013, the club considers itself a successor of the "original" FMP and in that sense incorporates the trophies won by that club. Trophies are:

- FR Yugoslavia Cup winner: 1 (1996–97)
- Radivoj Korać Cup winner: 3 (2002–03, 2004–05, 2006–07)
- Adriatic League champion: 2 (2003–04, 2005–06)

=== Individual awards ===
- Super League MVP Award (1):
  - (Serbia) Miloš Dimić – 2011–12
- Basketball League of Serbia Top Scorer (1):
  - (Serbia) Zlatko Bolić – 2008–09
- Adriatic League Top Prospect (1):
  - (Australia) Jonah Bolden – 2017

== Notable players ==
Note: Flags indicate national team eligibility at FIBA-sanctioned events. Players may hold other non-FIBA nationalities not displayed.

Criteria

To appear in this section a player must have either:

- Set a club record or won an individual award while at the club
- Played at least one official international match for their national team at any time
- Played at least one official NBA match at any time.

Radnički Novi Sad (1970–2009)

- (Serbia) Zlatko Bolić
- (Socialist Federal Republic of Yugoslavia) Stevan Karadžić

Radnički Basket/Radnički FMP (2009–2013)

- (Serbia) Miloš Dimić
- (Serbia) Nikola Rebić
- (Serbia) Dušan Ristić

FMP (2013–present)

- (Australia) Jonah Bolden
- (Australia) Isaac Humphries
- (Australia) Duop Reath
- (Lithuania) Paulius Valinskas
- (Montenegro) Bojan Subotić
- (Nigeria) Michael Ojo
- (New Zealand) Finn Delany
- (Puerto Rico) Trent Frazier
- (Slovenia) Jurij Macura
- (Slovenia) Matic Rebec
- (Serbia) Dragan Apić
- (Serbia) Filip Čović
- (Serbia) Dejan Davidovac
- (Serbia) Ognjen Dobrić
- (Serbia) Ilija Đoković
- (Serbia) Radovan Đoković
- (Serbia) Stefan Đorđević
- (Serbia) Marko Gudurić
- (Serbia) Marko Jeremić
- (Serbia) Ognjen Kuzmić
- (Serbia) Sava Lešić
- (Serbia) Stefan Pot
- (Serbia) Aleksa Radanov
- (Serbia) Marko Radovanović
- (Serbia) Boriša Simanić
- (Serbia) Radoš Šešlija
- (Serbia) Aleksa Uskoković
- (Turkey) Okben Ulubay
- (United States) Bryce Jones
- (United States) Charles Jenkins

== International record ==
| Season | Achievement | Notes |
Basketball Champions League
| 2022–23 | Qualifying rounds | Eliminated by Bakken Bears in Group D Final (82–88) |
