= KK Železničar Inđija =

Basketball club in Inđija, Serbia

Železničar Inđija
- Leagues: Second League of Serbia
- Founded: 1 March 1970; 55 years ago
- History: KK Železničar Inđija; 1970–present
- Location: Inđija, Serbia
- Team colors: Green, White

Košarkaški klub Železničar (Serbian Cyrillic: Кошаркашки клуб Железничар), commonly referred to as KK Železničar Inđija, is a men's professional basketball club based in Inđija, Serbia. They are currently competing in the Second League of Serbia.

The club competed in the Basketball League of Serbia during the 2011–12 season.

== Players ==
=== Current roster ===
Note: Flags indicate national team eligibility at FIBA sanctioned events. Players may hold other non-FIBA nationality not displayed.

No. / / Position / Player; / (Serbia) / PF / Aleksandar Kalanj

== Coaches ==
- (Socialist Federal Republic of Yugoslavia) Dobrivoje Ćorović (1990–1991)
- (Serbia and Montenegro) Dragan Marinković
- (Serbia) Zoran Sretenović (2006–2007)
- (Serbia) Zoran Sretenović (2009–2010)
- (Serbia) Aleksandar Bućan (2010–2011)
- (Serbia) Ivan Smiljanić (2011)
- (Serbia) Ivica Mavrenski (2011–2012)
- (Serbia) Vinko Bakić (2012–2015)
- (Serbia) Vladimir Jojić (2019–present)
