= KK Metalac Valjevo =

Basketball club in Valjevo, Serbia

Metalac Valjevo
- Leagues: Serbian First League
- Founded: 24 March 1948; 78 years ago
- History: KK Budućnost (1948–1954); KK Metalac (1954–present)
- Arena: Valjevo Sports Hall
- Capacity: 2,500
- Location: Valjevo, Serbia
- Team colors: Maroon and White
- President: Vladimir Marić
- Head coach: Miloš Mitrović
- Championships: 2 National League Cup
- Website: kkmetalac.org.rs
Home	Away

Košarkaški klub Metalac (Serbian Cyrillic: Кошаркашки клуб Металац), commonly referred to as KK Metalac, is a men's professional basketball club based in Valjevo, Serbia. They are currently competing in the Serbian First League.

== History ==
Metalac was established on 24 March 1948 as KK Budućnost Valjevo. Six days later, the club played its first official game in Čačak against Borac and lost 69:19. In a relatively short period of time, they managed to qualify for a higher level of competition, entering the South Group of a then minor Serbian League under the new name Metalac in 1954. Due to financial problems in 1960, the club had to leave all competitions and restart from scratch again a year after.

In 1973 Metalac managed to qualify for the First Yugoslav Federal League by beating Mladost Zemun in the last round of the competition, gaining a decisive advantage over Vojvodina Novi Sad. In the last round Luka Vidacic from Herceg-Novi scored a club record of 57 points. Metalac spent six consecutive seasons in the First League and managed to beat at least once all the big clubs of Yugoslav basketball in that period. They played their last game in Yugoslav First Federal League on 31 March 1979 against Jugoplastika in Split.

During the last couple of years, professional basketball in Valjevo is on the rise again. Metalac qualified for the top level of club competition in Serbia in 2007–08 and since then managed to progress to the Basketball League of Serbia Superleague phase five times. They have constantly been a serious contender for a spot in the Adriatic League over the past few seasons and finally became part of it in 2014–15 after Radnički Kragujevac opted out because of financial instability.

The club was a founding member of the Adriatic Basketball Association in 2015. In December 2020, the club's shares were transferred to FMP.

== Sponsorship naming ==
The club has had several denominations through the years due to its sponsorship:

- Metalac Family One: 1992–1993
- Big Enex Metalac: 1993–1995
- Metalac Koteks: 2012–2013
- Metalac Farmakom: 2013–2016

== Players ==
=== Current roster ===
Note: Flags indicate national team eligibility at FIBA-sanctioned events. Players may hold other non-FIBA nationalities not displayed.

Metalac Valjevo roster
Players
Coaches

Pos.	No.	Nat.	Name	Ht.	Age
F	0	(Serbia)	Odalović, Dušan	2.04 m (6 ft 8 in)	18 – 27 November 2007
PF	1	(United States)	Billingsley, Jalin	2.07 m (6 ft 9 in)	24 – 3 November 2002
PG	6	(Serbia)	Pavlović, Luka	1.85 m (6 ft 1 in)	17 – 7 August 2009
G/F	7	(Serbia)	Šekularac, Đorđe (TW)	1.97 m (6 ft 6 in)	19 – 23 July 2007
PG	8	(Serbia)	Đukanović, Đukan (C)	1.82 m (6 ft 0 in)	34 – 31 October 1992
G	10	(Bosnia and Herzegovina)	Gordić, Nemanja	1.93 m (6 ft 4 in)	38 – 25 September 1988
SF	11	(Serbia)	Dramićanin, Uroš	2.02 m (6 ft 8 in)	17 – 20 March 2009
C	13	(Serbia)	Janković, Nikola	2.06 m (6 ft 9 in)	32 – 13 February 1994
C	18	(Serbia)	Miladinović, Luka	2.12 m (6 ft 11 in)	17 – 3 October 2009
F/C	25	(Serbia)	Đurović, Nikola	2.10 m (6 ft 11 in)	17 – 30 April 2009
SG	49	(Serbia)	Mijailović, Uroš (TW)	1.98 m (6 ft 6 in)	18 – 6 March 2008
SF	94	(Serbia)	Danilović, Uroš (TW)	2.01 m (6 ft 7 in)	19 – 15 September 2007

Head coach

- (Serbia) Miloš Mitrović

Assistant coach(es)

- (Serbia) Luka Pavlović

Legend

- (C) Team captain
- (TW) Two-way affiliate player
- Injured

- Roster
Updated: October 7, 2026

=== Depth chart ===
Pos.	Starting 5	Bench 1	Bench 2
C	Nikola Janković	Luka Miladinović
PF	Nikola Đurović	Jalin Billingsley
SF	Uroš Danilović	Dušan Odalović	Uroš Dramićanin
SG	Đorđe Šekularac	Uroš Mijailović
PG	Nemanja Gordić	Đukan Đukanović	Luka Pavlović

== Honours ==
=== Domestic competitions ===
- Serbian League

Third place (1): 2014–15

- Serbian Cup

Semifinalist (1): 2016

- League Cup of Serbia (2nd-tier)

Winners (2): 2008–09, 2012–13
Runners-up (3): 2009–10, 2011–12, 2017–18

== Head coaches ==
- (Socialist Federal Republic of Yugoslavia) Čedomir Vidaković (1954–1955)
- (Socialist Federal Republic of Yugoslavia) Luka Stančić (1960–1974)
- (Socialist Federal Republic of Yugoslavia) Dragoljub Pljakić (1976–1977)
- (Socialist Federal Republic of Yugoslavia) Luka Stančić (1980–1985)
- (Socialist Federal Republic of Yugoslavia) Zoran Kovačević (1985–1987)
- (Socialist Federal Republic of Yugoslavia) Luka Stančić (1987–1988)
- (Socialist Federal Republic of Yugoslavia) Luka Stančić (1989–1990)
- (Federal Republic of Yugoslavia) Mihailo Poček (1990–1992)
- (Federal Republic of Yugoslavia) Dragomir Nikitović (1992)
- (Federal Republic of Yugoslavia) Zoran Kovačević (1992–1993)
- (Federal Republic of Yugoslavia) Vojislav Kecojević (1993–1995)
- (Serbia) Dragan Simeunović (2005–2008)
- (Serbia) Vlade Đurović (2008–2009)
- (Serbia) Aleksandar Icić (2009)
- (Serbia) Milovan Stepandić (2009–2010)
- (Serbia) Velimir Gašić (2010)
- (Serbia) Milovan Stepandić (2010–2011)
- (Serbia) Boško Đokić (2011–2012)
- (Serbia) Dragan Nikolić (2012–2013)
- (Serbia) Milovan Stepandić (2013)
- (Serbia) Siniša Matić (2013–2014)
- (Serbia) Vladimir Đokić (2014–2016)
- (Serbia) Mihailo Poček (2016–2019)
- (Serbia) Vladimir Đokić (2019–2021)
- (Serbia) Branislav Ratkovica (2021–2023)
- (Serbia) Saša Milićević (2023)
- (Serbia) Srđan Flajs (2023–2024)
- (Serbia) Đorđe Ilić (2024–2025)
- (Serbia) Miljan Pavković (2025–2026)
- (Serbia) Milos Mitrović (2026–)

== Notable players ==
- (Serbia) Stefan Birčević
- (Serbia) Petar Božić
- (Serbia) Vukašin Aleksić
- (Serbia) Zlatko Bolić
- (Serbia) Duško Bunić
- (Serbia) Marko Čakarević
- (Serbia) Vladimir Đokić
- (Serbia) Mile Ilić
- (Serbia) Marko Ljubičić
- (Serbia) Aleksandar Mitrović
- (Serbia) Petar Popović
- (Serbia) Stefan Sinovec
- (Jamaica) Kimani Ffriend
- (North Macedonia) Marko Dujković
- (Montenegro) Bojan Bakić
- (Montenegro) Vladimir Dašić
- (Montenegro) Ivan Maraš
- (Montenegro) Slavko Vraneš
- (United States) Reggie Freeman
- (United States) Ashton Mitchell
- (United States) Renaldo Woolridge
- (Serbia) Sava Lešić
- (Serbia) Uroš Luković
- (Serbia) Đorđe Majstorović
- (Serbia) Nikola Jevtović
- (Serbia) Marko Jošilo
- (Serbia) Nikola Malešević
- (Serbia) Marko Ljubičić
- (Serbia) Nemanja Protić
- (Serbia) Nikola Otašević
- (Serbia) Brano Đukanović
- (Serbia) Miloš Janković
- (Serbia) Đukan Đukanović
- (Serbia) Aleksandar Vasić
- (Serbia) Bojan Krstović
- (Serbia) Nenad Nerandžić
- (Serbia) Igor Đuković
- (Serbia) Nikola Tomašević
- (Serbia) Miroslav Pašajlić
- (Serbia) Aleksa Stepanović
- (Serbia) Miloš Glišić
- (Serbia) Zoran Paunović
- (Serbia) Milenko Veljković
- (Canada) Shamiel Stevenson
- (United States) Jorden Duffy
- (United States) Charles Manning Jr.
- (Bosnia and Herzegovina) Ibrahim Durmo
- (Serbia) Radoš Šešlija
- (Serbia) Miloš Grubor
- (United States) Terry Armstrong
- (United States) Demetrius Davis
- (United States) Terry Armstrong
- (Serbia) Miloš Koprivica
