= Basketball Cup of Serbia =

BFS Cup Куп КСС
- Founded: 2006; 19 years ago
- First season: 2006–07
- Country: Serbia
- Confederation: FIBA Europe
- Level on pyramid: 2nd
- Feeder to: Radivoj Korać Cup
- Current champions: Spartak Subotica (1st title) (2022–23)
- Most championships: FMP (4 titles)
- Website: lige.kss.rs
- Current season

The BFS Cup (Serbian Cyrillic: Куп KSS), commonly known as the Cup of Serbia (Serbian Cyrillic: Куп Србије), or the League Cup of Serbia (Serbian Cyrillic: Лига куп Србије), is the 2nd-tier national basketball cup of Serbia. It is run by the Basketball Federation of Serbia.

Prior to 2006, the Cup was organized as a state cup of Serbia, within Serbia and Montenegro (formerly FR Yugoslavia).

== Title holders ==
- 2006–07 Radnički 034 Group
- 2007–08 Zdravlje Actavis
- 2008–09 Metalac
- 2009–10 Radnički Basket
- 2010–11 Radnički Basket
- 2011–12 Radnički FMP
- 2012–13 Metalac
- 2013–14 Borac Mozzart Sport
- 2014–15 Vršac Swisslion
- 2015–16 FMP
- 2016–17 Dynamic BG
- 2017–18 Zlatibor
- 2018–19 Novi Pazar
- 2019–20 Sloboda Užice
- 2020–21 Vojvodina
- 2021–22 Borac Zemun
- 2022–23 Spartak Subotica

== The finals ==
Season	Champions	Score	Runners-up	Venue	Winning Coach	Ref.
2006–07	Radnički 034 Group	—	Mega Ishrana	Jezero Hall, Kragujevac	(Serbia) Zoran Cvetanović	
2007–08	Zdravlje Actavis	—	Borac	SRC Dubočica, Leskovac	(Serbia) Zoran Jović	
2008–09	Metalac	95–81	Sloga	Valjevo Sports Hall, Valjevo	(Serbia) Vlade Đurović	
2009–10	Radnički Basket	70–57	Metalac	Basket City, Belgrade	(Serbia) Boško Đokić	
2010–11	Radnički Basket	77–71	Napredak	Basket City, Belgrade	(Serbia) Miloš Pejić	
2011–12	Radnički FMP	82–77 (OT)	Metalac	Železnik Hall, Belgrade	(Serbia) Miloš Pejić	
2012–13	Metalac	63–56	Radnički FMP	Valjevo Sports Hall, Valjevo	(Serbia) Dragan Nikolić	
2013–14	Borac Mozzart Sport	94–81	FMP	Borac Hall, Čačak	(Serbia) Raško Bojić	
2014–15	Vršac Swisslion	93–88	Borac Mozzart Sport	Millennium Centar, Vršac	(Serbia) Dušan Gvozdić	
2015–16	FMP	75–61	Vršac Swisslion	Millennium Centar, Vršac	(Serbia) Slobodan Klipa	
2016–17	Dynamic BG	85–79	Zlatibor	Čajetina Sports Hall, Čajetina	(Serbia) Miroslav Nikolić	
2017–18	Zlatibor	80–71	Metalac	WAI TAI, Zlatibor	(Serbia) Vanja Guša	
2018–19	Novi Pazar	89–79	Sveti Đorđe	Sveti Sava ES Hall, Žitište	(Serbia) Oliver Popović	
2019–20	Sloboda Užice	109–105 (OT)	Radnički Beograd	Slobodan Piva Ivković Hall, Belgrade	(Serbia) Vladimir Lučić	
2020–21	Vojvodina	103–72	Radnički Kragujevac	Jezero Hall, Kragujevac	(Serbia) Miroslav Nikolić	
2021–22	Borac Zemun	86–79	Radnički Kragujevac	Pinki Hall, Belgrade	(Serbia) Siniša Matić	
2022–23	Spartak Subotica	78–69	Vojvodina	Dudova Šuma Hall, Subotica	(Serbia) Željko Lukajić	

=== Performance by club ===
Club	Winners	Runners-up	Winning years
FMP (Note: Includes record as Radnički Basket/Radnički FMP (2009–2012). Not affiliated with the former FMP (1991–2011).)	4	2	2009–10, 2010–11, 2011–12, 2015–16
Metalac	2	3	2008–09, 2012–13
Borac Čačak	1	2	2013–14
Vršac	1	1	2014–15
Zlatibor	1	1	2017–18
Vojvodina	1	1	2020–21
Spartak Subotica	1	0	2022–23
Borac Zemun	1	0	2021–22
Sloboda Užice	1	0	2019–20
Novi Pazar	1	0	2018–19
Dynamic BG	1	0	2016–17
Zdravlje	1	0	2007–08
Radnički KG 06	1	0	2006–07
Radnički Kragujevac	0	2	—
Radnički Beograd	0	1	—
Sveti Đorđe	0	1	—
Napredak	0	1	—
Sloga	0	1	—
Mega Basket	0	1	—

== Previous editions of the Cup of Serbia ==
=== 1992–2006 ===
Cup of Serbia Куп Србије
- Founded: 1992
- First season: 1992–93
- Folded: 2006
- Country: Serbia within FR Yugoslavia (1992–2003); Serbia and Montenegro (2003–2006)
- Level on pyramid: 2
- Promotion to: Yugoslav Cup; Radivoj Korać Cup

The Cup of Serbia (Serbian Cyrillic: Куп Србије), was a state basketball cup of Serbia, Serbia and Montenegro, until 2006. It was run by the Basketball Federation of Serbia and Montenegro.

Title holders

- 1992–93 not available
- 1993–94 not available
- 1994–95 not available
- 1995–96 not available
- 1996–97 not available
- 1997–98 not available
- 1998–99 not available
- 1999–00 Sloga
- 2000–01 not available
- 2001–02 not available
- 2002–03 Ergonom
- 2003–04 Lavovi 063
- 2004–05 NIS Vojvodina
- 2005–06 Atlas

=== 1945–1959 ===
Cup of Serbia Куп Србије
- Country: SR Serbia within Yugoslavia
- Level on pyramid: 1

The Cup of Serbia (Serbian Cyrillic: Куп Србије), was a state basketball cup of Serbia within Federal People's Republic of Yugoslavia.

Title holders

- 1946 not available
- 1947 not available
- 1948 not available
- 1949 not available
- 1950 Crvena zvezda
- 1951 Not held
- 1952 Crvena zvezda
- 1953 Crvena zvezda
- 1954 not available
- 1955 Crvena zvezda
- 1956 not available
- 1957 not available
- 1958 not available

== See also ==
- Radivoj Korać Cup
- Basketball League of Serbia
