= 2021–22 KK Slodes season =

Club's season

Slodes SoccerBet
2021–22 season
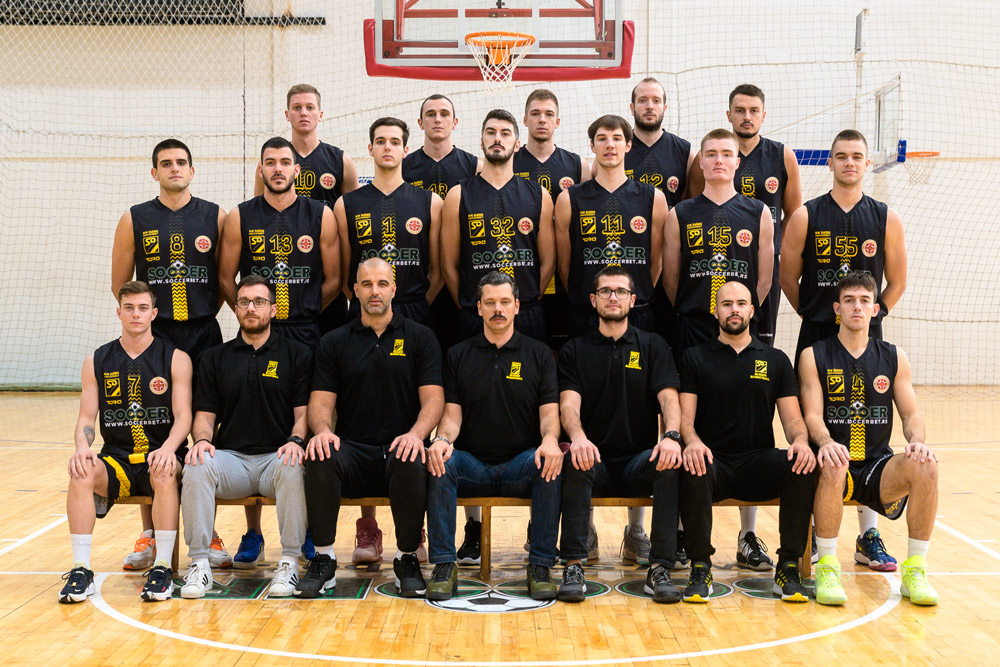
- Head coach: (Serbia) Marko Boras (until 15 December 2021) (Serbia) Nenad Karanović (interim) (15–28 December 2021) (Serbia) Igor Polenek (28 December–30 March 2022) (Serbia) Nenad Karanović (30 March 2022-End of the season)
- Arena: Slodes Hall
- Serbian League: Relegated
- Cup of Serbia: 1st part of the 2nd degree
- Radivoj Korać Cup: Not Qualified
- Super League: Not Qualified
- Biggest win: 81-69 vs Tamiš (23 October 2021)
- Biggest defeat: 114-74 vs Zlatibor (14 February 2021)
- All statistics correct as of March 14, 2022.

The 2021–22 season has been the 12th season in the existence of the basketball club KK Slodes, and historical as it was first season for the club in Basketball League of Serbia.

== Overview ==
After very successful season, finishing 2nd in Second Basketball League of Serbia, Slodes has got promoted to Basketball League of Serbia for the first time in club's history.

=== Off-season ===
Club's legend Nenad Mišanović decided to retire from basketball and become general manager of the club.

Petar Perković (to Rivers BM), Mihailo Krtolina (to Joker), Luka Sofijanić (to Borac Zemun), Petar Dilparić and Vukota Veličković (to Žarkovo) left the club in off-season.

Assistant coach, Dean Medan has left Slodes to join Darko Russo at Astana.

=== Pre-season ===
In summer 2020, the team started preparing for the Basketball League of Serbia's debut season by extending contracts with crucial players from last season: Uroš Ilić, Mateja Strinić, Branislav Sužnjev and captain Nikola Hristov. Also, adding Matija Radović, center Mihailo Todorović and duo from Dunav- Miloš Antić and Andrija Nešović to the roster.

Crvena zvezda sent Lazar Vasić, Nikola Manojlović and Filip Anđušić on loan to Slodes. Club promoted Marko Đorđević, Strahinja Knežević, Miloš Ilić and Luka Dimitrijević from youth academy to senior squad and landed Milan Nikolić.

On August 19, team played their first friendly game against ABA League team FMP and lost, 83–63. Three days later, Slodes beat OKK Beograd away in Radivoj Korac Hall by 100-102 and recorded its first victory in the preparations for the new season.

On August 31, club announcements changing its name to Slodes Soccerbet due to sponsorship reasons.

Slodes has continued preparations for the upcoming season by playing friendly matches against Dynamic, Kolubara LA 2003, Tamiš and Žitko Basket. Club was supposed to be part of tournament in Smederevska Palanka along with Tamiš, Klik and host Mladost SP but tournament was cancelled due to COVID-19 pandemic.

=== October ===
On 2 October, Slodes Soccerbet debuted in Basketball League of Serbia against OKK Beograd and lost in a close match 80–76.

On 9 October, Club played first Basketball League of Serbia home game in Slodes Hall against Vojvodina.

On 10 October, Ivan Pavićević has left club and transferred to Benfica.

Match against Dynamic was broadcast live on Arena Sport TV.

On 23 October, Slodes Soccerbet recorded their first win of the 2021–22 Basketball League of Serbia season by beating Tamiš at home.

Power forward, Uroš Ilić left club for Promo Donji Vakuf.

=== November ===
On 6 November, Slodes Soccerbet recorded their first away victory by beating Dunav after overtime in Park Hall in Stara Pazova.

Milan Nikolić left club for Czech Olomucko.

On 20 November, team managed to comeback after 20 point deficit after first half but unfortunately lost to Kolubara LA 2003 79:78.

On 22 November, Slodes Soccerbet lost to Žitko Basket in Cup of Serbia.

=== December ===
On 15 December, head coach Marko Boras, assistant coach Miloš Šakota, condition coach Aleksa Russo and 5 players have left the club including captain Hristov. Slodes U17 coach Nenad Karanović was appointed as interim coach until club find new head coach.

After previous captain Nikola Hristov left club, Vuk Karadžić was appointed as new team captain.

Karanović led team in matches against Radnički Kragujevac and OKK Belgrade, where he gave chances to young players Luka Dimitrijević and Miloš Ilić due to huge problems with the roster.

On 22 December, Soccerbet ended cooperation with club. Club continued with old name - Slodes.

On 28 December, Igor Polenek was appointed as new head coach.

Crvena zvezda recalled Nikola Manojlović from Slodes and sent him on loan to FMP.

=== January ===
New head coach, Igor Polenek brought Stefan Miljenović, Dušan Hukić and Bogdan Riznić to the club with him.

U17 squad captain Aleksa Anufrijev was promoted to senior squad for match against Tamiš.

=== February ===
Members of U17 squad, Petar Radojković and Uroš Janjić were promoted to senior squad for the match against Dynamic.

=== March ===
On 17 March, Marko Đorđević terminated his contract with the club.

=== April ===
After the match against Mladost Zemun, Igor Polenek got fired and Nenad Karanović was returned as head coach.

The club finished the season with a score of 2 wins and 28 losses and got relegated to the Second Basketball League of Serbia.

== Roster ==
Note: Flags indicate national team eligibility at FIBA-sanctioned events. Players may hold other non-FIBA nationalities not displayed.

Slodes roster
Players
Coaches

Pos.	No.	Nat.	Name	Ht.	Age
G/F	0	(Serbia)	Jocić, Mihailo	1.95 m (6 ft 5 in)	24 – 12 May 2000
F/C	1	(Montenegro)	Anđušić, Filip (L)	2.08 m (6 ft 10 in)	23 – 22 January 2002
PG	7	(Serbia)	Miljenović, Stefan	2.01 m (6 ft 7 in)	23 – 21 August 2001
PF	8	(Serbia)	Janjić, Uroš	2.05 m (6 ft 9 in)	20 – 7 January 2005
SG	9	(Serbia)	Knežević, Strahinja	1.97 m (6 ft 6 in)	21 – 2 March 2004
SF	5	(Serbia)	Ilić, Miloš	2.00 m (6 ft 7 in)	19 – 15 June 2005
PG	10	(Serbia)	Vasić, Lazar (L)	1.91 m (6 ft 3 in)	24 – 3 January 2001
SG	12	(Serbia)	Dimitrijević, Luka	1.95 m (6 ft 5 in)	19 – 7 May 2005
SG	13	(Serbia)	Radović, Matija	2.01 m (6 ft 7 in)	26 – 25 April 1998
F	15	(Serbia)	Knežević, Vuk	2.03 m (6 ft 8 in)	23 – 8 February 2002
SG	18	(Switzerland)	Nešović, Andrija	1.90 m (6 ft 3 in)	24 – 7 April 2000
PF	32	(Serbia)	Hukić, Dušan	2.07 m (6 ft 9 in)	31 – 15 June 1993
G	99	(Serbia)	Karadžić, Vuk	1.96 m (6 ft 5 in)	28 – 24 June 1996
G/F	11	(Serbia)	Riznić, Bogdan	2.01 m (6 ft 7 in)	35 – 24 February 1990
PF	55	(Serbia)	Anufrijev, Aleksa	1.95 m (6 ft 5 in)	20 – 9 January 2005
SG	14	(Serbia)	Radojković, Petar	1.88 m (6 ft 2 in)	20 – 1 March 2005

Head coach

- (Serbia) Igor Polenek

Assistant coach(es)

- (Serbia) Uroš Mijatović
- (Serbia) Nenad Karanović
- (Serbia) Darko Madžarević

Legend

- (C) Team captain
- Injured

- Roster

=== Players with multiple nationalities ===
- (Switzerland) (Serbia) Andrija Nešović

=== Roster changes ===
==== In ====
No.	Pos.	Nat.	Name	Moving from		Type	Date	Source
13	SF	(Serbia)	Matija Radović	Mladost Zemun	(Serbia)	Transfer	Preseason	
32	C	(Serbia)	Mihailo Todorović	Kolubara LA 2003	(Serbia)	Transfer	Preseason	
18	SG	(Switzerland)	Andrija Nešović	Dunav	(Serbia)	Transfer	17 August 2021	
8	SF	(Serbia)	Miloš Antić	Dunav	(Serbia)	Transfer	17 August 2021	
1	C	(Montenegro)	Filip Anđušić	Crvena zvezda	(Serbia)	Loan	August 2021	
10	PG	(Serbia)	Lazar Vasić	Crvena zvezda	(Serbia)	Loan	August 2021	
55	SG	(Serbia)	Nikola Manojlović	Crvena zvezda	(Serbia)	Loan	August 2021	
4	SF	(Serbia)	Marko Djordjević	Slodes U19	(Serbia)	Promoted	2 October 2021	
9	SG	(Serbia)	Strahinja Knežević	Slodes U19	(Serbia)	Promoted	2 October 2021	
12	SG	(Serbia)	Luka Dimitrijević	Slodes U17	(Serbia)	Promoted	2 October 2021	
5	SF	(Serbia)	Miloš Ilić	Slodes U17	(Serbia)	Promoted	2 October 2021	
−	SG	(Serbia)	Milan Nikolić	Zlatibor	(Serbia)	Transfer	6 November 2021	
7	PG	(Serbia)	Stefan Miljenović	Leotar	(Bosnia and Herzegovina)	Transfer	11 January 2022	
32	C	(Serbia)	Dušan Hukić	Radnik Bijeljina	(Bosnia and Herzegovina)	Transfer	11 January 2022	
55	PF	(Serbia)	Aleksa Anufrijev	Slodes U17	(Serbia)	Promoted	19 January 2022	
11	SF	(Serbia)	Bogdan Riznić	Radnik Bijeljina	(Bosnia and Herzegovina)	Transfer	31 January 2022	
8	C	(Serbia)	Uroš Janjić	Slodes U17	(Serbia)	Promoted	3 February 2022	
14	SF	(Serbia)	Petar Radojković	Slodes U17	(Serbia)	Promoted	3 February 2022	

==== Out ====
No.	Pos.	Nat.	Name	Moving to		Type	Date	Source
−	C	(Serbia)	Nenad Mišanović	Retired		Retirement	10 April 2021	
−	SF	(Serbia)	Mihailo Krtolina	Joker	(Serbia)	Free transfer	Offseason	
−	SF	(Serbia)	Petar Perković	Rivers BM	(Serbia)	Free transfer	Offseason	
−	SG	(Serbia)	Luka Sofijanić	Borac Zemun	(Serbia)	Free transfer	Offseason	
−	SG	(Serbia)	Petar Dilparić	Žarkovo	(Serbia)	Free transfer	August 2021	
−	SG	(Serbia)	Vukota Veličković	Žarkovo	(Serbia)	Free transfer	August 2021	
−	C	(Serbia)	Ivan Pavićević	Benfica	(Portugal)	Transfer	10 October 2021	
11	PF	(Serbia)	Uroš Ilić	Promo Donji Vakuf	(Bosnia and Herzegovina)	Transfer	23 October 2021	
−	PG	(Serbia)	Milan Nikolić	Olomucko	(Czech Republic)	Transfer	14 November 2021	
32	C	(Serbia)	Mihailo Todorović	Tamiš	(Serbia)	Parted ways	15 December 2021	
4	PG	(Serbia)	Mateja Strinić	Tamiš	(Serbia)	Parted ways	15 December 2021	
5	SG	(Serbia)	Nikola Hristov	Žitko Basket	(Serbia)	Parted ways	15 December 2021	
7	PG	(Serbia)	Branislav Sužnjev	Žitko Basket	(Serbia)	Parted ways	15 December 2021	
8	SF	(Serbia)	Miloš Antić	Primorje Herceg Novi	(Montenegro)	Parted ways	15 December 2021	
55	SG	(Serbia)	Nikola Manojlović	FMP	(Serbia)	Recall from loan	28 December 2021	
4	SF	(Serbia)	Marko Djordjević	Free agent	(Serbia)	Parted ways	17 March 2022	

=== Coaching changes ===
Team	Outgoing manager	Date of vacancy	Position in table	Replaced with	Date of appointment	Ref.
Slodes	(Serbia) Marko Boras	15 December 2021	16th (2–12)	(Serbia) Nenad Karanović (interim)	15 December 2021	
Slodes	(Serbia) Nenad Karanović (interim)	28 December 2021	16th (2–15)	(Serbia) Igor Polenek	28 December 2021	
Slodes	(Serbia) Igor Polenek	30 March 2022	16th (2–26)	(Serbia) Nenad Karanović	30 March 2022	

== Pre-season and friendlies ==
Win Loss

19 August 2021	FMP (Serbia)	83–63	(Serbia) Slodes	Belgrade
	Scoring by quarter: 22–16, 19–24, 18–12, 23–11
				Arena: Železnik Hall

22 August 2021	OKK Beograd (Serbia)	100–102	(Serbia) Slodes	Belgrade
	Scoring by quarter: 34–25, 27-23, 21-32, 18-22
				Arena: Radivoj Korać Hall

27 August 2021	Dynamic (Serbia)	87–84	(Serbia) Slodes	Belgrade
	Scoring by quarter: 25–24, 30-23, 14-15, 18-22
				Arena: Dynamic Sports Center

4 September 2021	Kolubara (Serbia)	68–75	(Serbia) Slodes Soccerbet	Lazarevac
	Scoring by quarter: ?-?, ?-?, ?-?, ?-?
				Arena: SRC Kolubara

18 September 2021	Slodes Soccerbet (Serbia)	77–82	(Serbia) Tamiš	Belgrade
	Scoring by quarter: ?-?, ?-?, ?-?, ?-?
				Arena: Slodes Hall

== Basketball League of Serbia ==
=== Standings ===
Pos	Team	Pld	W	L	PF	PA	PD	Pts	Qualification or relegation
12	Dunav	30	14	16	2430	2485	−55	44	
13	OKK Beograd	30	14	16	2642	2694	−52	44	
14	Kolubara LA 2003	30	12	18	2442	2549	−107	42	
15	Radnički	30	11	19	2424	2464	−40	41	Relegation to Second League
16	Slodes SoccerBet	30	2	28	2297	2804	−507	32	Relegation to Second League

Source: KLS, SrbijaSport

=== Matches ===
Win Loss

2 October 2021 1	OKK Beograd	80–76	Slodes Soccerbet	Belgrade
12:00	Scoring by quarter: 25-14, 20-17, 11-18, 24-27
	Pts: Luka Mitrović 17; Rebs: Petar Kovačević 12; Asts: Luka Mitrović 3 PIR: Petar Kovačević 33		Pts: Nikola Hristov 20; Rebs: Mihailo Todorović 10; Asts: Branislav Sužnjev 5 PIR: Mihailo Todorović 17	Arena: Mega Factory; Attendance: 150; Referees: Aleksandar Glišić, Ivan Stefanović, Danilo Petković

8 October 2021 2	Slodes Soccerbet	70–100	Vojvodina	Belgrade
16:00	Scoring by quarter: 12-29, 15-25, 25-15, 18-31
	Pts: Nikola Manojlović 12; Rebs: Mihailo Todorović 5 Asts: Branislav Sužnjev 4 PIR: Nikola Manojlović 19		Pts: Nikola Gaćeša 21; Rebs: Dušan Beslać 6 Asts: Marko Ljubičić 10; PIR: Nikola Gaćeša 27	Arena: Slodes Hall; Attendance: 150; Referees: Uroš Obrknežević, Marko Strika, Nikola Miloradović

15 October 2021 3	Dynamic	89–78	Slodes Soccerbet	Belgrade
18:00	Scoring by quarter: 24-21, 14-14, 36-28, 15-15
TV Arena Sport	Pts: Yiğit Onan 18; Rebs: Yiğit Onan 10; Asts: Nenad Šulović 5 PIR: Ilija Milijašević 18		Pts: Nikola Manojlović 20; Rebs: Nikola Manojlović 10; Asts: Miloš Antić 4 PIR: Nikola Manojlović 26	Arena: Dynamic Sports Center; Attendance: 100; Referees: Aleksandar Milojević, Vladimir Vesković, Stefan Zdravković

23 October 2021 4	Slodes Soccerbet	81–69	Tamiš	Belgrade
12:00	Scoring by quarter: 16-17, 20-21, 23-18, 22-13
	Pts: Lazar Vasić 21; Rebs: Filip Anđušić 7 Asts: Lazar Vasić 5 PIR: Lazar Vasić 27		Pts: Ivan Smiljanić 21; Rebs: Lazar Lugić 8 Asts: Marko Šinik 5 PIR: Ivan Smiljanić 29	Arena: Slodes Hall; Attendance: 100; Referees: Nemanja Ninković, Ljubomir Marković, Nemanja Vlahović

27 October 2021 5	Vršac	105–79	Slodes Soccerbet	Vršac
18:00	Scoring by quarter: 33-16, 19-17, 25-22, 28-24
	Pts: Toma Vasiljević 22; Rebs: Toma Vasiljević 10; Asts: Miloš Nikolić 4 PIR: Miloš Dimić 30, Mateja Majstorović 30		Pts: Filip Anđušić 20; Rebs: Filip Anđušić 11; Asts: Nikola Manojlović 3 PIR: Filip Anđušić 29	Arena: Millennium Center; Attendance: No attendance allowed Referees: Petar Pešić, Marko Simić, Vladimir Vesković

30 October 2021 6	Slodes Soccerbet	81–100	Sloboda Užice	Belgrade
16:00	Scoring by quarter: 23-30, 27-27, 17-23, 14-20
TV Arena Sport	Pts: Mihailo Todorović 27; Rebs: Mihailo Todorović 10; Asts: Mihailo Todorović 6 PIR: Mihailo Todorović 39		Pts: Aleksa Ilić 25; Rebs: Nedeljko Prijović 8 Asts: Jan Novak 8 PIR: Nedeljko Prijović 28, Aleksa Ilić 28	Arena: Slodes Hall; Attendance: 80; Referees: Radoš Arsenijević, Stefan Ćalić, Miloš Hadžić

6 November 2021 7	Dunav	93–101(OT)	Slodes Soccerbet	Stara Pazova
19:00	Scoring by quarter: 28-19, 21-26, 17-16, 20-25, Overtime: 7-15
	Pts: Dušan Tanasković 19; Rebs: Dušan Tanasković 10; Asts: Aleksandar Miljković 3 PIR: Dušan Tanasković 23		Pts: Nikola Hristov 21; Rebs: Miloš Antić 5 Asts: Branislav Sužnjev 7 PIR: Nikola Hristov 23	Arena: Hall Park; Attendance: 60; Referees: Milivoje Jovčić, Marko Pecelj, Nemanja Vlahović

14 November 2021 9	Metalac	93–71	Slodes Soccerbet	Valjevo
19:00	Scoring by quarter: 29-22, 29-18, 20-14, 15-17
	Pts: Danilo Aranitović 22; Rebs: Milenko Veljković 9 Asts: Igor Mijajlović 9 PIR: Danilo Aranitović 28		Pts: Vuk Karadžić 20; Rebs: Mihailo Todorović 8 Asts: Branislav Sužnjev 4 PIR: Milan Nikolić 18, Vuk Karadžić 18	Arena: Valjevo Sports Hall; Attendance: 100; Referees: Aleksandar Milojević, Dragan Matić, Stevan Krstić

17 November 2021 8	Slodes Soccerbet	76–87	Zlatibor	Belgrade
17:00	Scoring by quarter: 21-23, 21-18, 17-21, 17-25
	Pts: Miloš Antić 15; Rebs: Mihailo Todorović 6 Asts: Lazar Vasić 4 PIR: Andrija Nešović 14		Pts: Dušan Kutlešić 29; Rebs: LaQuinton Ross 9 Asts: Sandi Grubelič 5 PIR: Dušan Kutlešić 30	Arena: Sldoes Hall; Attendance: 30; Referees: Vladimir Vesković, Jasmina Juras, Marko Strika

20 November 2021 10	Kolubara LA 2003	79–78	Slodes Soccerbet	Lazarevac
19:00	Scoring by quarter: 28-13, 22-17, 16-23, 13-25
	Pts: Nikola Simić 21; Rebs: Emmanuel Denis Monceau 11; Asts: Nikola Simić 6 PIR: Emmanuel Denis Monceau 21		Pts: Nikola Manojlović 20; Rebs: Mihailo Todorović 15; Asts: Nikola Hristov 5 PIR: Mihailo Todorović 29	Arena: SRC Kolubara; Attendance: 830; Referees: Siniša Prpa, Ivan Ilić, Strahinja Dašić

28 November 2021 11	Slodes Soccerbet	71–75	Novi Pazar	Belgrade
15:00	Scoring by quarter: 23-17, 20-20, 15-25, 13-13
	Pts: Nikola Manojlović 16; Rebs: Filip Anđušić 11; Asts: Branislav Sužnjev 4 PIR: Filip Anđušić 21		Pts: Matija Novković 18; Rebs: Asmir Numanović 10; Asts: Asmir Numanović 2 PIR: Altin Islamović 23	Arena: Slodes Hall; Attendance: 50; Referees: Milivoje Jovčić, Jasmina Juras, Vladimir Tomić

4 December 2021 12	Zdravlje Leskovac	82–78	Slodes Soccerbet	Leskovac
17:00	Scoring by quarter: 17-20, 26-9, 20-18, 19-31
	Pts: Cornelius Lamonte Hudson 26; Rebs: Miloš Petković 6 Asts: Daniel Vujasinović 5 PIR: Cornelius Lamonte Hudson 29		Pts: Filip Anđušić 21; Rebs: Filip Anđušić 7 Asts: Nikola Hristov 5 PIR: Filip Anđušić 27	Arena: SRC Dubočica; Attendance: 700; Referees: Siniša Prpa, Ivan Ilić, Vojkan Živković

8 December 2021 13	Slodes Soccerbet	77–102	Mladost Zemun	Belgrade
15:00	Scoring by quarter: 20-27, 17-29, 26-22, 14-24
	Pts: Filip Anđušić 21; Rebs: Filip Anđušić 8 Asts: Branislav Sužnjev 7 PIR: Filip Anđušić 26		Pts: Strahinja Gavrilović 18, Andrija Bojić 18; Rebs: Strahinja Gavrilović 11; Asts: Otis Antoine Livingston 9 PIR: Nikola Kovačević 22, Andrija Bojić 22	Arena: Slodes Hall; Attendance: 67; Referees: Marko Pecelj, Marko Strika, Dejan Mizdrak

12 December 2021 14	Sloga	105–82	Slodes Soccerbet	Kraljevo
19:30	Scoring by quarter: 27-17, 31-12, 27-28, 20-25
	Pts: Nikola Kostić 20; Rebs: Nikola Kostić 8 Asts: Filip Samojlović 8 PIR: Nikola Kostić 33		Pts: Lazar Vasić 20; Rebs: Mihailo Todorović 10; Asts: Mihailo Todorović 6 PIR: Lazar Vasić 22	Arena: Kraljevo Sports Hall; Attendance: 1000; Referees: Ivan Stefanović, Stefan Ćalić, Marko Simić

18 December 2021 15	Slodes Soccerbet	78–98	Radnički Kragujevac	Belgrade
14:00	Scoring by quarter: 18-20, 20-24, 19-25, 21-29
	Pts: Andrija Nešović 20; Rebs: Filip Anđušić 7,Nikola Manojlović 7 Asts: Andrija Nešović 4, Nikola Manojlović 4 PIR: Nikola Manojlović 23		Pts: Raško Katić 29; Rebs: Raško Katić 7, Filip Dumić 7 Asts: Filip Dumić 11; PIR: Raško Katić 31	Arena: Slodes Hall; Attendance: 120; Referees: Vladimir Jevtović, Ljubomir Marković, Stevan Krstić

26 December 2021 16	Slodes	74–111	OKK Beograd	Belgrade
19:00	Scoring by quarter: 26-38, 15-20, 13-26, 20-27
	Pts: Lazar Vasić 17; Rebs: Filip Anđušić 6 Asts: Vuk Karadžić 6 PIR: Lazar Vasić 17		Pts: Petar Kovačević 33; Rebs: Petar Kovačević 11; Asts: Luka Mitrović 11; PIR: Petar Kovačević 36	Arena: Slodes Hall; Attendance: 75; Referees: Aleksandar Glišić, Radoš Arsenijević, Vojkan Živković

11 January 2022 17	Vojvodina	88–63	Slodes	Novi Sad
18:30	Scoring by quarter: 19-9, 31-12, 21-28, 17-14
	Pts: Vasilije Vučetić 16; Rebs: Vasilije Vučetić 11; Asts: Marko Ljubičić 6 PIR: Vasilije Vučetić 27		Pts: Stefan Miljenović 18; Rebs: Dušan Hukić 10; Asts: Vuk Karadžić 4 PIR: Stefan Miljenović 17	Arena: SPC Vojvodina; Attendance: 60; Referees: Jasmina Juras, Jelena Smiljanić, Marko Simić

19 January 2022 19	Tamiš	109–78	Slodes	Pančevo
18:30	Scoring by quarter: 38-22, 22-22, 25-14, 24-20
	Pts: Patrick Terrence Hardy Jr 22; Rebs: Branislav Terzić 10; Asts: Marko Šinik 7 PIR: Marko Šinik 26		Pts: Stefan Miljenović 29; Rebs: Matija Radović 8 Asts: Stefan Miljenović 5 PIR: Stefan Miljenović 38	Arena: Strelište Sports Hall; Referees: Duško Sedlar, Stefan Ćalić, Vladimir Tomić

31 January 2022 21	Sloboda Užice	93–76	Slodes	Užice
18:00	Scoring by quarter: 29-21, 18-15, 18-19, 28-21
	Pts: Aleksa Ilić 17; Rebs: Đorđe Božić 8 Asts: Đorđe Dimitrijević 8 PIR: Đorđe Božić 24		Pts: Matija Radović 23; Rebs: Dušan Hukić 11; Asts: Bogdan Riznić 5 PIR: Matija Radović 23	Arena: Veliki Park Sports Hall; Attendance: 900; Referees: Aleksandar Milojević, Ivan Ilić, Stefan Zdravković

3 February 2022 18	Slodes	71–108	Dynamic	Belgrade
16:00	Scoring by quarter: 13-25, 22-34, 17-20, 19-29
	Pts: Andrija Nešović 23; Rebs: Andrija Nešović 6 Asts: Vuk Knežević 5 PIR: Stefan Miljenović 23	[ ]	Pts: Mihailo Bošković 22; Rebs: Dušan Radosavljević 12; Asts: Yiğit Onan 5 PIR: Mihailo Bošković 29	Arena: Slodes Hall; Attendance: 35; Referees: Stefan Ćalić, Danilo Petković, Marko Simić

9 February 2022 20	Slodes	69–89	Vršac	Belgrade
14:00	Scoring by quarter: 21-19, 19-23, 15-29, 14-18
	Pts: Vuk Karadžić 15; Rebs: Bogdan Riznić 8 Asts: Stefan Miljenović 7 PIR: Stefan Miljenović 16		Pts: Vojin Ilić 23; Rebs: Toma Vasiljević 10; Asts: Bogdan Tejić 7 PIR: Toma Vasiljević 29	Arena: Slodes Hall; Attendance: 50; Referees: Petar Pešić, Dejan Mizdrak, Nemanja Vlahović

14 February 2022 23	Zlatibor	114–84	Slodes	Čajetina
18:00	Scoring by quarter: 36-22, 28-31, 23-10, 27-21
	Pts: Dušan Kutlešić 24; Rebs: Lazar Joksimović 9 Asts: Tadija Tadić 11; PIR: Dušan Kutlešić 31		Pts: Stefan Miljenović 21; Rebs: Stefan Miljenović 11; Asts: Vuk Karadžić 4 PIR: Stefan Miljenović 32	Arena: SC Čajetina; Attendance: 350; Referees: Dragan Matić, Đorđe Bogojević, Vojkan Živković

26 February 2022 24	Slodes	74–83	Metalac	Belgrade
13:00	Scoring by quarter: 15-25, 17-16, 16-22, 26-20
	Pts: Andrija Nešović 20; Rebs: Dušan Hukić 10; Asts: Stefan Miljenović 10; PIR: Stefan Miljenović 31		Pts: Uroš Luković 25; Rebs: Uroš Luković 17; Asts: Igor Mijajlović 9 PIR: Uroš Luković 42	Arena: Slodes Hall; Attendance: 70; Referees: Aleksandar Glišić, Vojkan Živković, Ivana Ivavanović

2 March 2022 22	Slodes	79–81	Dunav	Belgrade
15:00	Scoring by quarter: 23-23, 14-33, 24-12, 18-13
	Pts: Filip Anđušić 28; Rebs: Filip Anđušić 15; Asts: Stefan Miljenović 7 PIR: Filip Anđušić 39		Pts: Tomislav Cvitković 17; Rebs: Dušan Tanasković 10; Asts: Vuk Malidžan 4 PIR: Tomislav Cvitković 22	Arena: Slodes Hall; Attendance: 50; Referees: Siniša Prpa, Stevan Krstić, Stefan Zdravković

6 March 2022 25	Slodes	87–94	Kolubara LA 2003	Belgrade
13:00	Scoring by quarter: 19-21, 16-31, 31-14, 21-28
	Pts: Andrija Nešović 24; Rebs: Filip Anđušić 12; Asts: Stefan Miljenović 5 PIR: Stefan Miljenović 33		Pts: Shakur Hannah Supreme 21; Rebs: Shakur Hannah Supreme 7 Asts: Nikola Simić 11; PIR: Sead Hadžifejzović 30, Nikola Simić 30	Arena: Slodes Hall; Attendance: 60; Referees: Marko Pecelj, Danilo Petković, Marko Simić

13 March 2022 26	Novi Pazar	92–68	Slodes	Novi Pazar
18:00	Scoring by quarter: 25-13, 25-22, 26-13, 16-20
	Pts: Nemanja Nikolić 22; Rebs: Nemanja Nikolić 10; Asts: Fahrudin Manjgafić 6 PIR: Nemanja Nikolić 37		Pts: Stefan Miljenović 20; Rebs: Bogdan Riznić 9 Asts: Vuk Karadžić 3 PIR: Stefan Miljenović 25	Arena: Doguš Sports Academy; Attendance: 300; Referees: Dragan Matić, Dejan Mizdrak, Đorđe Bogojević

19 March 2022 27	Slodes	62–77	Zdravlje Leskovac	Belgrade
13:00	Scoring by quarter: 16-19, 10-24, 17-15, 19-19
	Pts: Stefan Miljenović 26; Rebs: Dušan Hukić 11; Asts: Dušan Hukić 4 PIR: Stefan Miljenović 33		Pts: Svetozar Stamenković 13, Stevan Jovanović 13, Miloš Jović 13; Rebs: Stevan Jovanović 11; Asts: Noah Blackwell 6 PIR: Stevan Jovanović 16, Miloš Stojanović 16	Arena: Slodes Hall; Attendance: 50; Referees: Petar Pešić, Jelena Smiljanić, Ivana Ivavanović

30 March 2022 28	Mladost Zemun	120–81	Slodes	Zemun
16:00	Scoring by quarter: 30-19, 31-25, 33-18, 26-20
	Pts: Strahinja Gavrilović 18; Rebs: Strahinja Gavrilović 8 Asts: Đorđe Milosavljević 10; PIR: Ousainou Sarr 22		Pts: Bogdan Riznić 21; Rebs: Filip Anđušić 10; Asts: Vuk Karadžić 7 PIR: Bogdan Riznić 27	Arena: SC Master; Attendance: 46; Referees: Dragan Matić, Dejan Mizdrak, Marko Simić

4 April 2022 29	Slodes	88–102	Sloga	Belgrade
13:00	Scoring by quarter: 26-33, 18-24, 25-21, 19-24
	Pts: Andrija Nešović 15; Rebs: Bogdan Riznić 11; Asts: Vuk Karadžić 6 PIR: Stefan Miljenović 21		Pts: Stefan Matović 23; Rebs: Đorđe Simeunović 7 Asts: Luka Petrović 10; PIR: Stefan Matović 32	Arena: Slodes Hall; Attendance: 50; Referees: Uroš Nikolić, Danilo Petković, Stefan Zdravković

9 April 2022 30	Radnički Kragujevac	86–66	Slodes	Kragujevac
18:00	Scoring by quarter: 17-5, 25-25, 22-20, 22-16
	Pts: Lazar Stanković 25; Rebs: Luka Tomašević 7 Asts: Luka Tomašević 6 PIR: Ivan Nedeljković 25, Lazar Stanković 25		Pts: Filip Anđušić 20; Rebs: Bogdan Riznić 10; Asts: Bogdan Riznić 3, Lazar Vasić 3 PIR: Filip Anđušić 28	Arena: SBB Hala Jezero; Attendance: 250; Referees: Vladimir Vesković, Strahinja Dašić, Vojkan Živković

== Cup of Serbia ==
Win Loss

22 November 2021 1	Žitko Basket	77–62	Slodes Soccerbet	Belgrade
17:30	Scoring by quarter: 23-17, 21-16, 21-13, 12-16
				Arena: SC Košutnjak
