= 2021–22 Basketball League of Serbia =

Basketball League of Serbia season

- League: Basketball League of Serbia
- Season: 2021–22
- Dates: 22 October 2021 – 9 April 2022 (First League); 7–24 May 2022 (SuperLeague Playoffs); 10–19 June 2022 (SuperLeague Final Four)
- Games played: 30 each (First League)
- Teams: 16 (First League); 21 (total)

Regular season
- ABA 2 League: Zlatibor; Sloga
- Champions League: FMP Meridian
- Season MVP: (Serbia) Dušan Kutlešić
- Relegated: Radnički Kragujevac; Slodes Soccerbet

Finals
- Champions: Crvena zvezda mts
- Runners-up: FMP Meridian
- Semi-finalists: Mega Mozzart; Partizan NIS
- Finals MVP: (Montenegro) Nikola Ivanović

Awards
- SuperLeague MVP: Not awarded

Statistical leaders
Points	(Serbia) Dušan Kutlešić	20.33
Rebounds	(Serbia) Strahinja Gavrilović	9.25
Assists	(Bosnia and Herzegovina) Nemanja Nikolić	6.8
Index Rating	(Serbia) Dušan Kutlešić	24.23

Records
- Biggest home win: Mladost MaxBet 109–64 Metalac (3 December 2021)
- Biggest away win: OKK Beograd 68–106 Zlatibor (12 December 2021)
- Highest scoring: Mladost MaxBet 130–94 Novi Pazar (12 December 2021)
- Lowest scoring: Zdravlje 57–60 Vojvodina (22 October 2021)
- Losing streak: 23, Slodes
- Highest attendance: 4,236; Crvena zvezda mts 114–78 Mega Mozzart (10 June 2022)
- Lowest attendance: 20; Dynamic VIP PAY 77–68 Zdravlje (27 October 2021)
- Average attendance: 886, Sloga

Seasons
- ← 2020–21 2022–23 →
- All statistics correct as of June 19, 2022.

The 2021–22 Admiral Bet Basketball League of Serbia (Serbian Cyrillic: Кошаркашка лига Србије 2021–22.) was the 16th season of the Basketball League of Serbia, the top-tier professional basketball league in Serbia. Also, it is the 78th national championship played by Serbian clubs inclusive of the nation's previous incarnations as Yugoslavia and Serbia & Montenegro.

== Teams ==
A total of 21 teams participated in the 2021–22 Basketball League of Serbia as confirmed by the Basketball Federation of Serbia on 30 June 2021. Crvena zvezda mts was the defending champion.

=== Distribution ===
The following is the access list for this season.

Access list for the 2021–22 Serbian League
	Teams entering in this round	Teams advancing from the previous round
First League (16 teams)	14 highest-placed teams from the last season; 2 highest-placed teams from the Second League	
SuperLeague Playoffs (8 teams)	2 lowest-placed teams from the Adriatic League teams (Borac, Mega Mozzart)	6 highest-placed teams from the First League
SuperLeague Final Four (4 teams)	3 highest-placed teams from the Adriatic League teams (Crvena zvezda, Partizan, FMP Meridian)	Winner from the SuperLeague Playoffs

=== Promotion and relegation ===
Teams promoted from the Second League

- Zdravlje Leskovac
- Slodes SoccerBet

Teams relegated to the Second League

- Napredak JKP
- Pirot

=== Venues and locations ===
Location of clubs in the 2021–22 season

Club	Home city	Arena	Capacity
Borac	Čačak	Borac Hall	2,000
Crvena zvezda mts	Belgrade	Aleksandar Nikolić Hall	5,878
Dunav	Stari Banovci	Park Hall	—N/a
Dynamic VIP PAY	Belgrade	Ranko Žeravica Hall	5,000
FMP Meridian	Belgrade	Železnik Hall	3,000
Kolubara LA 2003	Lazarevac	Kolubara Sport Center	1,700
Mega Mozzart	Belgrade	Mega Factory	700
Metalac	Valjevo	Valjevo Sports Hall	1,500
Mladost MaxBet	Zemun	Master Sport Center	750
Novi Pazar	Novi Pazar	Pendik Sports Hall	1,600
OKK Beograd	Belgrade	Mega Factory	700
Partizan NIS	Belgrade	Štark Arena	18,386
Radnički	Kragujevac	Jezero Hall	3,750
Sloboda	Užice	Veliki Park Hall	2,200
Slodes SoccerBet	Belgrade	Slodes Hall	2,000
Sloga	Kraljevo	Kraljevo Sports Hall	3,350
Tamiš	Pančevo	Strelište Sports Hall	1,100
Vojvodina	Novi Sad	SPC Vojvodina	7,022
Vršac	Vršac	Millennium Center	4,400
Zdravlje	Leskovac	SRC Dubočica	3,600
Zlatibor	Čajetina	Čajetina Sport Center	1,000

Clubs that play in the 2021–22 First Adriatic League not playing in the regular season.
Clubs that play in the 2021–22 Second Adriatic League

== First League ==
The 2021–22 First League season started on 2 October 2021.

=== Personnel and sponsorship ===
Team	Head coach	Captain	Kit manufacturer	Shirt sponsor
Dunav	(Serbia) Milivoje Lazić	(Serbia) Aleksandar Miljković	Cvetex	—
Dynamic VIP PAY	(Serbia) Saša Nikitović		Ardu Sport	VIP PAY
Kolubara LA 2003	(Serbia) Stevan Mijović	(Serbia) Nikola Simić	Seven	EPS / Grad Lazarevac
Metalac	(Serbia) Branislav Ratkovica	(Serbia) Igor Mijajlović	Peak	—
Mladost MaxBet	(Serbia) Dragan Jakovljević	(Serbia) Marko Milenković	CK	MaxBet
Novi Pazar	(Serbia) (Greece) Darko Kostić	(Serbia) Asmir Numanović	Unit	Admiral
OKK Beograd	(Montenegro) Vasilije Budimić	(Serbia) Marko Boltić	Adidas	—
Radnički	(Serbia) Filip Socek	(Serbia) Raško Katić	Seven	City of Kragujevac
Sloboda	(Serbia) Oliver Popović		Ardu Sport	mts
Slodes SoccerBet	(Serbia) Nenad Karanović	(Serbia) Vuk Karadžić	—	SoccerBet
Sloga	(Serbia) Marko Dimitrijević		Maluro	—
Tamiš	(Serbia) Bojan Jovičić	(Serbia) Saša Radović	STX	—
Vojvodina	(Serbia) Miroslav Nikolić	(Serbia) Krsto Bjelica	Peak	—
Vršac	(Serbia) Siniša Matić	(Serbia) Miloš Dimić	Ardu Sport	Villager / Element
Zdravlje	(Serbia) Lazar Spasić	(Serbia) Milan Radivojević	Maluro	—
Zlatibor	(Serbia) Strajin Nedović	(Serbia) Dušan Kutlešić	Ardu Sport	Boje i fasade Maxima

==== Coaching changes ====
Team	Outgoing manager	Date of vacancy	Position in table	Replaced with	Date of appointment	Ref.
OKK Beograd	(Serbia) Branislav Ratkovica	26 May 2021	Off-season	(Montenegro) Vasilije Budimić	26 May 2021	
Metalac	(Serbia) Vladimir Đokić	7 June 2021	Off-season	(Serbia) Branislav Ratkovica	7 June 2021	
Tamiš	(Serbia) Nebojša Vidić	June 2021	Off-season	(Serbia) Bojan Jovičić	June 2021	
Vršac	(Serbia) Vladimir Lučić	August 2021	Off-season	(Serbia) Vladimir Đokić	12 August 2021	
Dunav	(Serbia) Mitar Ašćerić	August 2021	Off-season	(Serbia) Milivoje Lazić	1 September 2021	
Kolubara LA 2003	(Serbia) Marko Dimitrijević	August 2021	Off-season	(Serbia) Stevan Mijović	August 2021	
Sloga	(Serbia) Dragan Kostić	August 2021	Off-season	(Serbia) Marko Dimitrijević	August 2021	
Slodes Soccerbet	(Serbia) Marko Boras	15 December 2021	16th (2–12)	(Serbia) Nenad Karanović (interim)	15 December 2021	
Slodes Soccerbet	(Serbia) Nenad Karanović (interim)	28 December 2021	16th (2–15)	(Serbia) Igor Polenek	28 December 2021	
Radnički	(Serbia) Ivica Vukotić	21 February 2022	13th (9–12)	(Serbia) Filip Socek	21 February 2022	
Vršac	(Serbia) Vladimir Đokić	18 March 2022	7th (13–13)	(Serbia) Siniša Matić	18 March 2022	
Slodes	(Serbia) Igor Polenek	30 March 2022	16th (2–26)	(Serbia) Nenad Karanović	30 March 2022	

=== Standings ===
Pos	Team	Pld	W	L	PF	PA	PD	Pts	Qualification or relegation
1	Zlatibor	30	22	8	2762	2414	+348	52	Qualification to Super League and ABA 2
2	Sloga	30	20	10	2559	2465	+94	50	Qualification to Super League and ABA 2
3	Vojvodina	30	19	11	2475	2284	+191	49	Qualification to Super League
4	Mladost MaxBet	30	19	11	2781	2648	+133	49	Qualification to Super League
5	Dynamic VIP PAY	30	18	12	2584	2414	+170	48	Qualification to Super League
6	Sloboda	30	16	14	2638	2507	+131	46	Qualification to Super League
7	Tamiš	30	15	15	2480	2474	+6	45	
8	Metalac	30	15	15	2415	2528	−113	45	
9	Novi Pazar	30	15	15	2467	2599	−132	45	
10	Zdravlje	30	14	16	2368	2450	−82	44	
11	Vršac	30	14	16	2453	2438	+15	44	
12	Dunav	30	14	16	2430	2485	−55	44	
13	OKK Beograd	30	14	16	2642	2694	−52	44	
14	Kolubara LA 2003	30	12	18	2442	2549	−107	42	
15	Radnički	30	11	19	2424	2464	−40	41	Relegation to Second League
16	Slodes SoccerBet	30	2	28	2297	2804	−507	32	Relegation to Second League

Source: KLS, SrbijaSport

== SuperLeague ==
The Playoffs are the second stage of the 2021–22 Serbian League season. The Super League was canceled due to ABA League schedule conflict and the qualified teams will play in the Playoffs.

On 9 June 2022, Partizan announced withdrawal from the 2022 Serbian League playoffs following numerous incidents in the 2022 ABA League Finals.

=== Qualified teams ===
First ABA League	Regular season
Borac; Crvena zvezda mts FMP Meridian; Mega Mozzart; Partizan NIS	1 Zlatibor; 2 Sloga; 3 Vojvodina; 4 Mladost MaxBet; 5 Dynamic VIP PAY; 6 Sloboda

==== Personnel and sponsorship ====
Team	Head coach	Captain	Kit manufacturer	Shirt sponsor
Borac Čačak	(Serbia) Marko Marinović	(Serbia) Uroš Čarapić	—	P.S. Fashion
Crvena zvezda mts	(Montenegro) Dejan Radonjić	(Serbia) Branko Lazić	Adidas	mts / SoccerBet
Dynamic VIP PAY	(Serbia) Saša Nikitović		Ardu Sport	VIP PAY
FMP Meridian	(Serbia) Nenad Stefanović	(Serbia) Marko Radonjić	Adidas	—
Mega Mozzart	(Serbia) Vlada Jovanović	(Serbia) Luka Cerovina	Adidas	Mozzart
Mladost MaxBet	(Serbia) Dragan Jakovljević	(Serbia) Marko Milenković	CK	MaxBet
Partizan NIS	(Serbia) Željko Obradović	(Serbia) Rade Zagorac	Under Armour	NIS / mts
Sloboda	(Serbia) Oliver Popović		Ardu Sport	mts
Sloga	(Serbia) Marko Dimitrijević		Maluro	—
Vojvodina	(Serbia) Miroslav Nikolić	(Serbia) Krsto Bjelica	Peak	—
Zlatibor	(Serbia) Strajin Nedović	(Serbia) Dušan Kutlešić	Ardu Sport	Boje i fasade Maxima

==== Coaching changes ====
Team	Outgoing manager	Date of vacancy	Position in table	Replaced with	Date of appointment	Ref.
FMP Meridian	(Serbia) Vanja Guša	1 June 2021	Off-season	(Serbia) Nenad Stefanović	2 June 2021	
Partizan NIS	(Serbia) Aleksandar Matović	25 June 2021	Off-season	(Serbia) Željko Obradović	25 June 2021	

=== SuperLeague Playoffs ===
Teams involved:

- 2 lowest-placed Serbian teams from the Adriatic League: Borac, Mega Mozzart
- 6 highest-placed teams from the First League: Zlatibor, Sloga, Vojvodina, Mladost MaxBet, Dynamic VIP PAY, Sloboda

Quarterfinals
7–9 May
Mega Mozzart	2
Sloboda	0
7–9 May
Sloga	0
Vojvodina	2
7–9 May
Borac	2
Dynamic VIP PAY	0
7–9 May
Zlatibor	0
Mladost MaxBet	2

Semifinals
14–16 May
Mega Mozzart	2
Vojvodina	0
14–18 May
Borac	2
Mladost MaxBet	1

Final
22–24 May
Mega Mozzart	2
Borac	0

=== SuperLeague Final Four ===
Teams involved:

- 3 highest-placed Serbian teams from the First ABA League: Crvena zvezda mts, Partizan NIS (withdraw), FMP Meridian
- winner of the SuperLeague Playoffs: Mega Mozzart

Semifinals
10−12 June
Crvena zvezda mts	2
Mega Mozzart	1
Partizan NIS
FMP Meridian	w/o

Final
June
Crvena zvezda mts	2
FMP Meridian	0

2021–22 Basketball League of Serbia Champions

Crvena zvezda mts
22nd title

== See also ==
- List of current Basketball League of Serbia team rosters
- 2021–22 Second Men's League of Serbia (basketball)
- 2021–22 Radivoj Korać Cup
- 2021–22 Basketball Cup of Serbia
- 2021–22 ABA League First Division
- 2021–22 ABA League Second Division
- 2021–22 First Women's Basketball League of Serbia
- 2021–22 KK Crvena zvezda season
- 2021–22 KK Partizan season
