= KK Borac Zemun =

Basketball club in Belgrade, Serbia

Borac Zemun
- Leagues: Basketball League of Serbia
- Founded: April 2009; 17 years ago
- History: KK Mladost 2009; 2009–2014; KK Borac Zemun; 2014–present
- Arena: Pinki Hall
- Capacity: 2,000
- Location: Belgrade, Serbia
- Team colors: Blue, white, orange, fluorescent green.
- President: Slobodan Srezoski
- Head coach: Darko Kostić
- Affiliations: Mladost Zemun; 2009–2014

Košarkaški klub Borac Zemun (Serbian Cyrillic: Кошаркашки клуб Борац Земун, transl. Borac Zemun Basketball Club), commonly referred to as KK Borac Zemun, is a men's professional basketball club based in Zemun, near Belgrade, Serbia. They are currently competing in the Basketball League of Serbia.

== History ==
The club was found in April 2009 as a farm team of Mladost Zemun under the name ZKK Mladost 2009 (Zemunski košarkaški klub Mladost 2009). In 2014, the club was disaffiliated from Mladost and changed its name to KK Borac Zemun. The club used to play in the 3rd-tier First Regional League of Serbia, Center Division.

In September 2020, they got a wild card and promotion to the Second Basketball League of Serbia for the 2020–21 season following withdrawal of Zemun. In January 2022, the club won the 2nd-tier Cup of Serbia, after a 86–79 win over Radnički Kragujevac in the final. It qualified them for the 2022 Radivoj Korać Cup.

At the end of the 2024/25 season, KK Borac Zemun took second place in the league and won a place in KLS.

In their debut 2025/26 season in the KLS, KK Borac Zemun finished in 7th place.

== Home arena ==
Borac Zemun plays its home games at the Pinki Hall. The hall is located in the Zemun Municipality in Belgrade and was built in 1974, and renovated in 2015. It has a seating capacity of 2,000 seats.

== Players ==
- Stefan Balmazović
- Igor Mijajlović
- Nikola Silađi
- Đukan Đukanović
- Stefan Sinovec
- Bogdan Riznić
- Miloš Dimić
- Milivoje Božović

== Players Season 2024/25 ==
- (Serbia) Milivoje Božović
- (Serbia) Stefan Sinovec
- (Serbia) Milan Nikolić
- (Serbia) Miloš Dimić
- (Serbia) Omer Derdemez
- (Serbia) Marko Đorđević
- (Serbia) Luka Pavlović
- (Serbia) Miloje Šušić
- (Serbia) Ognjen Ivković
- (Serbia) Viktor Blagovčanin
- (Serbia) Aleksandar Ilić
- (Serbia) Marko Andrić
- (Serbia) Mladen Kovačević
- (Serbia) Lazar Trifković
- (Serbia) Milan Pavlović
- (Serbia) Vuk Radović
- (Serbia) Nebojša Žakula
- (Serbia) Marko Ekmedžić

== Players Season 2025/26 ==
- (Serbia) Milivoje Božović
- (Serbia) Omer Derdemez
- (Serbia) Miloje Šušić
- (Serbia) Aleksandar Ilić
- (Serbia) Lazar Trifković
- (Serbia) Marko Ekmedžić
- (Serbia) Aleksandar Nikolić
- (Serbia) Vuk Gugović
- (Serbia) Vuk Višnjić
- (Serbia) Miloš Savković
- (Serbia) Matija Stamenić
- (Serbia) Vid Krunić
- (Serbia) Nemanja Kapetanović
- (Serbia) Marko Šinik
- (United States) Joey Baker
- (Serbia) Nino Čelebić
- (United States) Michael Thomas
- (United States) Jackson Dubinski

== Players Season 2026/27 ==
- (Serbia) Omer Derdemez
- (Serbia) Miloje Šušić
- (Serbia) Lazar Trifković
- (Serbia) Aleksandar Nikolić
- (Serbia) Matija Stamenić
- (Serbia) Vid Krunić
- (Serbia) Nemanja Nikolić
- (United States) Wyatt Helming
- (United States) Avery Huggins
- (Serbia) Boško Bumbić
- (Bosnia and Herzegovina) Fahrudin Manjgafić

== Head coaches ==
- (Serbia) Vedran Popović (2020–2021)
- (Serbia) Siniša Matić (2021–2022)
- (Serbia) Pavle Trifunović (2022)
- (Serbia) Dejan Đokić (2022)
- (Serbia) Marko Boras (2022–2024)
- (Serbia) Pavle Trifunović (2024-2026)
- (Serbia) Darko Kostić (2026-present)

== Trophies and awards ==
=== Trophies ===
- League Cup of Serbia (2nd-tier)
  - Winner (1): 2021–22

== See also ==
- KK Mladost Zemun
- KK Zemun
