= Goran Topić =

Serbian basketball coach and scout

FMP
- Positions: Assistant coach Basketball League of Serbia
- League: ABA League

Personal information
- Born: 3 May 1967 (age 59) Vršac, SR Serbia, SFR Yugoslavia
- Coaching career: 1992–present

Career history

Coaching
- 1992–2003: Hemofarm Women (youth)
- 2003–2004: Hemofarm Women
- 2004–2012: Hemofarm (assistant)
- 2012–2014: Crvena zvezda (assistant)
- 2014–2015: Turów Zgorzelec (assistant)
- 2016–2018: Vršac (assistant)
- 2018: Vršac
- 2021–present: FMP (assistant)

Goran Topić (Serbian Cyrillic: Горан Топић; born 3 May 1967) is a Serbian professional basketball coach and scout, who is an assistant coach of FMP of the ABA League and the Basketball League of Serbia.

== Coaching career ==
=== Men's club basketball ===
From 2007 to 2012, Topić had been a part of coaching staffs of the Hemofarm head coaches Miroslav Nikolić, Vlada Vukoičić, Stevan Karadžić, Željko Lukajić, and Nebojša Bogavac.

In September 2012, he was added to the coaching staff of Crvena zvezda as an assistant coach. He worked there until the end of the 2013–14 season. During the 2014–15 season, he was an assistant coach for the Turów Zgorzelec of the Polish Basketball League. In 2016, he worked as an assistant coach for the Vršac under head coach Milan Gurović. After Gurović left Vršac, Topić continued to work as a part of the staff of new head coach Vladimir Đokić.

On January 21, 2018, Topić was named a head coach for Vršac.

In May 2022, Topić signed a contract extension with FMP.

=== Women's club basketball ===
On June 27, 2003, Topić was named the new head coach of Hemofarm.

=== National team ===
In 2012, Topić was an assistant coach for the women's national team of Serbia in the Marina Maljković's staff. Also in the same year, he was an assistant coach of Dušan Ivković in the men's national team of Serbia.

== Scouting career ==
In 2014, Topić was added as a national team scout for the Serbia men's national basketball team. He was a staff member of a head coach Aleksandar Đorđević for two FIBA World Cups (2014 and 2019), the 2016 Summer Olympics, and two EuroBaskets (2015 and 2017).

== Career achievements ==
As scout

- 2014 FIBA World Championship: Silver
- 2016 Summer Olympics: Silver
- EuroBasket 2017: Silver
