= Miloš Vraneš =

Serbian basketball player (born 1995)

No. 26 – Klosterneuburg Dukes
- Position: Small forward / shooting guard
- League: Austrian Basketball Bundesliga

Personal information
- Born: April 25, 1995 (age 31) Belgrade, Serbia, FR Yugoslavia
- Listed height: 6 ft 7 in (2.01 m)
- Listed weight: 201 lb (91 kg)

Career information
- College: North Dakota State (2014–2016); Southeast Missouri State (2016–2018)
- NBA draft: 2018: undrafted
- Playing career: 2012–present

Career history
- 2012–2014: KK Partizan
- 2018–2019: Spišská Nová Ves
- 2019–2020: Vršac (Hemofarm)
- 2020–2021: Pirot
- 2021–2022: Mladost Mrkonjić Grad
- 2021–2022: Teodo Tivat
- 2022–2022: Slodes Beograd
- 2022–2023: Spars Sarajevo
- 2023–2024: KK Tikvesh
- 2024–present: Klosterneuburg Dukes

Career highlights
- All-Mon-Dak First Team (2016); All-Mon-Dak Second Team (2015)
Medals
Men's basketball
Representing Serbia
U20 European Championship
2017 Summer Universiade

Miloš Vraneš (born April 25, 1995) is a Serbian professional basketball player for Klosterneuburg Dukes that competes in Austrian Basketball Bundesliga. Milos played Division 1 college basketball for the Southeast Missouri State Redhawks. Standing at 6 ft 7 in (2.01 m), he plays at the shooting guard and small forward positions.

== College career ==
Miloš Vraneš signed a National Letter of Intent with Southeast Missouri State Redhawks on May 5, 2016. He played under head coach Rick Ray and competed in Ohio Valley Conference. Southeast Missouri State Redhawks was first in the West Division and made it to the OVC Tournament both years. Before Southeast Missouri State Redhawks, Milos played for two years in North Dakota State.

== Professional career ==
In January 2019, Milos Vraneš began his professional career after great years in NCAA Division I College Basketball. Vraneš started his pro career in Europe, where he signed for BK Spišská Nová Ves. Vraneš competed in Slovak Basketball League and Slovak Basketball Cup.

The following season, 2019–20, Miloš signed a deal with KK Vršac (Hemofarm) of the Basketball League of Serbia. In August 2020, Vraneš signed for Pirot and stayed in Basketball League of Serbia for one more year (season 2020–2021) where he averaged 12.6 points and 7 rebounds per game.

Season 2021–22, Miloš Vraneš signed for Mladost Mrkonjić Grad, and added another competition to his professional career, Basketball Championship of Bosnia and Herzegovina. The second part of a season, Vraneš signed for KK Teodo Tivat, and had great season competing in Prva A Liga.

On 1 September 2022, he signed an open contract with Slodes.

Shortly after his signature, he accepted an offer from OKK Spars Sarajevo and agreed to compete in ABA League Second Division. This season, Milos averaged 14.7 points and 7 rebounds per game, while shooting 45.8% form the three point line.

Next year, Milos signed a contract with KK Tikvesh one of the best clubs from North Macedonia, and started competing in Macedonian First League (basketball). He was a starting small forward, often played at the power forward position. Milos had another amazing season averaging 13 points, and was the top rebounder averaging 7.5 rebounds (3 offensive rebounds), helping his team reach the Cup of Macedonia Semifinals. He received the Eurobasket.com All-North Macedonian League Honorable Mention for his performance.

In early July, 2024, Milos Vranes inks a contract with Klosterneuburg Dukes that competes in Austrian Basketball Bundesliga.

== National Team career ==
Vraneš was a part of the Serbian national team basketball camp that was held in Denver, Colorado. He was a part of the team chosen to represent the Serbia men's national basketball team at the international basketball tournament in Dalian, China where they ended up being second after losing to Lithuania. He won the gold medal while playing for Serbia at the tournament in Weinan. Milos was a part of the Serbian men's university basketball team chosen to play at the 2017 Summer Universiade that were held in Taipei, Taiwan. Serbia was first in the group stage and ended up its competition in the semi-final after losing to the United States men's national basketball team. He was a starting shooting guard averaging 12.7 points, 6.1 rebounds and 2.4 assists per game.
