= Kapetanović =

Kapetanović is a Bosnian/Croatian/Serbian surname meaning "captain's son".

It may refer to:

- Aret Kapetanovic (born Emma Komlosy), British singer/songwriter
- Domagoj Kapetanović (born 1926–2005), Croatian footballer and manager
- Goran Kapetanović (born 1974), Bosnian-Swedish writer and film director
- Mehmed-beg Kapetanović Ljubušak (1839–1902), Bosniak author and public official
- Mirza Kapetanović (born 1959), Bosnian former footballer
- Nemanja Kapetanović (born 1997), Serbian basketball player
- Sead Kapetanović (born 1972), Bosnian former footballer
- Selma Kapetanović (born 1996), Bosnian footballer

== See also ==
- Ivana Kapitanović, Croatian handballer
