= Nemanja Kapetanović =

Serbian basketball player

Rabotnički
- Position: Shooting guard
- League: Macedonian League

Personal information
- Born: 3 February 1997 (age 29) Belgrade, Serbia, FR Yugoslavia
- Listed height: 1.97 m (6 ft 6 in)
- Listed weight: 89 kg (196 lb)

Career information
- Playing career: 2015–present

Career history
- 2015–2016: Jagodina
- 2016: Beovuk 72
- 2016–2018: Mega
- 2018: Dynamic
- 2018–2019: Vršac
- 2019: Tamiš
- 2020–2021: Batumi
- 2021–2022: Mladost Mrkonjic Grad
- 2022–2023: Sloboda Užice
- 2023–2024: Joker
- 2024–2025: Rabotnički
- 2025–present: Borac Zemun

Nemanja Kapetanović (Serbian Cyrillic: Немања Капетановић; born 3 February 1997) is a Serbian professional basketball player for Rabotnički of the Macedonian League.

== Playing career ==
Kapetanović was born in Belgrade, Serbia, FR Yugoslavia. He started to play basketball for youth teams of Belgrade-based teams; Crvena zvezda and Partizan.

During his professional career, Kapetanović played for Jagodina, Beovuk 72, Mega, Dynamic, Vršac, and Tamiš.

== Nationale team career ==
Kapetanović was a member of the Serbia U20 team that participated at the 2017 FIBA Europe Under-20 Championship in Greece. Over five tournament games, he averaged 8.4 points, 1.8 rebounds and 0.6 assists per game.
