= Milivoje Božović =

Serbian basketball player

KK Borac Zemun
- Position: Power forward
- League: KLS

Personal information
- Born: 15 December 1985 (age 40) Nikšić, SFR Yugoslavia
- Listed height: 2.10 m (6 ft 11 in)
- Listed weight: 94 kg (207 lb)

Career information
- NBA draft: 2007: undrafted
- Playing career: 2003–present

Career history
- 2003–2005: Lavovi 063
- 2005–2007: Mega Vizura
- 2006: → OKK Beograd
- 2007–2011: Hemofarm
- 2011: Budućnost Podgorica
- 2011–2012: Sant'Antimo
- 2013: Borac Čačak
- 2013–2014: Vojvodina Srbijagas
- 2014–2016: SCM CSU Craiova
- 2016–2017: Chabab Rif Al Hoceima
- 2017–2018: Kakanj
- 2018–2019: Sloboda Tuzla
- 2019–2020: Oroszlányi
- 2020–2021: KK Čelik
- 2021–2023: KK Budućnost Bijeljina
- 2023–2024: KK Bosna Meridianbet
- 2024–present: KK Borac Zemun

Milivoje Božović (born 15 December 1985) is a Serbian professional basketball player for KK Borac Zemun of the KLS.

== Career ==
He played with Belgrade clubs Lavovi 063, Mega Vizura and OKK Beograd before joining Hemofarm where he spent four seasons. In the summer of 2011 he signed with Budućnost Podgorica, but was released in November 2011. In December 2011, he signed with Sant'Antimo of the Legadue, for the rest of the season.

In January 2013, he returned to Serbia and signed with Borac Čačak. During the summer of 2013 he was on trial with Alba Berlin and Turów Zgorzelec, but did not signed. In November 2013, he returned to Borac Čačak, but after only one game he left them and signed with Vojvodina Srbijagas for the rest of the season.

In September 2014, he signed with SCM CSU Craiova in Romania. In 2020, Božović joined KK Čelik. He parted ways with the team on 6 December 2021. On 15 December, Božović signed with KK Budućnost Bijeljina of the First League of Republika Srpska.
