= Miloš Šakota =

Greek–Serbian basketball player and coach

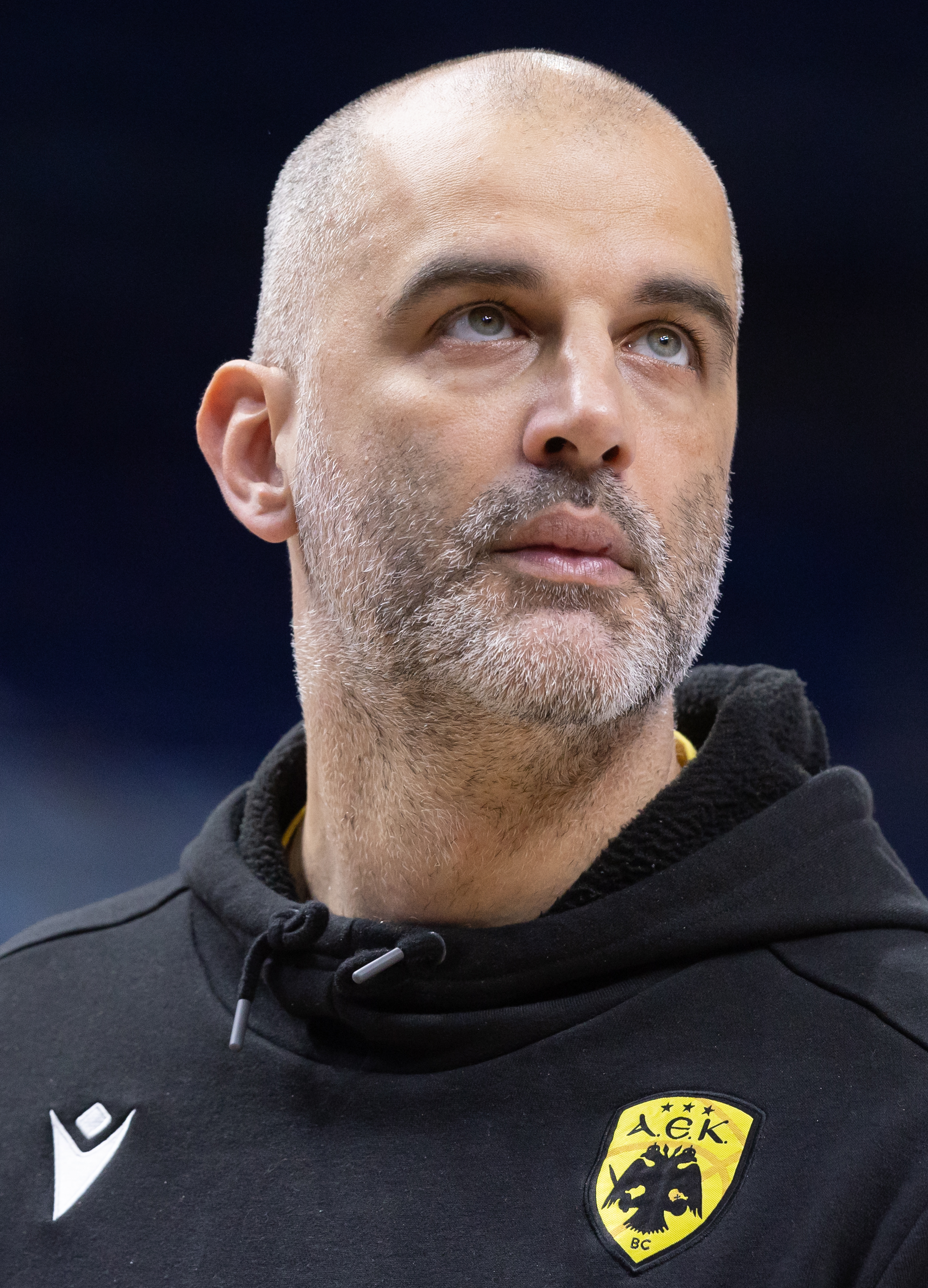
- Šakota in 2026

AEK Athens
- Title: Assistant coach
- League: GBL

Personal information
- Born: 11 June 1984 (age 42) Belgrade, SR Serbia, Yugoslavia
- Listed height: 2.05 m (6 ft 9 in)

Career information
- NBA draft: 2006: undrafted
- Playing career: 2002–2015, 2016–2020
- Position: Small forward / power forward
- Number: 8, 12
- Coaching career: 2015, 2020–present

Career history

Playing
- 2003–2004: Ionikos NF
- 2005–2006: Near East
- 2008–2009: CSKA Sofia
- 2010–2011: Olympias Patras
- 2013–2014: Arkadikos
- 2014–2015: AE Livadia
- 2016–2017: AE Santorinis
- 2017–2018: Lokros Atalantis
- 2018–2020: Slodes

Coaching
- 2015: AEK Athens (assistant)
- 2018–2021: Slodes (assistant)
- 2021–2022: Žitko Basket (youth)
- 2022–2024: Crvena zvezda Youth
- 2024–present: AEK Athens (assistant)

Miloš Šakota (Serbian Cyrillic: Милош Шакота, Greek: Μίλος Σάκοτα, born 11 June 1984) is a Greek–Serbian professional basketball coach and former player who is the assistant coach of AEK Athens. Standing at 6 ft 9 in (2.06 m), he played both small forward and power forward positions.

== Playing career ==
Šakota played for Ionikos NF, Near East, Aigaleo, Apollon Limassol (Cyprus), CSKA Sofia (Bulgaria), Al Nizwa (Oman), Olympias Patras, Arkadikos, and AE Livadia during his playing career. He played in the European-wide 2nd-tier level EuroCup, during the 2003–04 season, with Ionikos NF. He retired as a player with Livadia in 2015, to pursuit a coaching career.

In October 2016, Šakota returned from the retirement and signed for AE Santorinis. On 31 July 2017, he signed for Lokros Atalantis. In 2018, Šakota joined a roster Slodes of the Second Basketball League of Serbia, upon an invitation of Nenad Mišanović. For the second time, he retired as a player in 2020.

== Coaching career ==
Šakota has a stint in 2015 when the Greek League club AEK hired him as an assistant coach, joining the coaching staff of his father Dragan Šakota.

After second retirement in 2020, Šakota joined the Slodes staff as an assistant coach. Afterwards, he joined a youth system of Žitko Basket as the U19 head coach.

On 17 August 2022, Crvena zvezda hired Šakota as their new head coach for the under-16 team.

Ον August 5, 2024, Šakota returned to AEK as an assistant coach. On August 20, 2025, he renewed his contract with the club for 2 more years.

== Personal life ==
Šakota is a son of Dragan Šakota, a professional basketball coach and former player, and the older brother of Dušan Šakota, a retired Greek professional basketball player. His father Dragan is a FIBA Saporta Cup champion in 1991 and FIBA Champions League champion in 2018. His brother Dušan is a two-time EuroLeague champion, winning both titles with Panathinaikos, in 2007 and 2009.
