= 2021–22 Radivoj Korać Cup =

Serbian basketball tournament

2022 Triglav osiguranje^{1} Radivoj Korać Cup
Tournament details
- Country: Serbia
- City: Niš
- Venue: Čair Sports Center
- Dates: 17–20 February 2022
- Teams: 8
- Defending champions: Crvena zvezda mts
- TV partner: Arena Sport

Final positions
- Champions: Crvena zvezda mts
- Runners-up: Partizan NIS
- Semifinalists: Mega Mozzart; FMP Meridian

Tournament statistics
- Matches played: 7
- Attendance: 17,000 (2,429 per match)
- Scoring leader(s): (France) Mathias Lessort

Awards
- MVP: (United States) Nate Wolters
- All statistics correct as of 20 February 2022 (UTC).^{1} Sponsored cup name, referring to Triglav Osiguranje

The 2022 Triglav osiguranje Radivoj Korać Cup was the 20th season of the Serbian men's national basketball cup tournament. The tournament was held in Niš from 17 to 20 February 2022.

Crvena zvezda mts successfully defended their title. Borac Zemun made their debut at the national cup tournament.

== Qualified teams ==
ABA League First Division	Basketball League of Serbia	2nd-tier Cup of Serbia
Borac Čačak; Crvena zvezda mts FMP Meridian; Mega Mozzart; Partizan NIS	Zlatibor (1st) ^{L}	Borac Zemun; Radnički Kragujevac

^{L} The league table position after 15 rounds played

=== Personnel and sponsorship ===
Team	Head coach	Captain	Kit manufacturer	Shirt sponsor
Borac Čačak	(Serbia) Marko Marinović	(Serbia) Nemanja Todorović	—	P.S. Fashion
Borac Zemun	(Serbia) Siniša Matić	(Serbia) Luka Vukojičić	—	—
Crvena zvezda mts	(Montenegro) Dejan Radonjić	(Serbia) Branko Lazić	Adidas	mts / SoccerBet
FMP Meridian	(Serbia) Nenad Stefanović	(Serbia) Danilo Tasić	Adidas	—
Mega Mozzart	(Serbia) Vlada Jovanović	(Serbia) Luka Cerovina	Adidas	Mozzart
Partizan NIS	(Serbia) Željko Obradović	(Serbia) Rade Zagorac	Under Armour	NIS / mts
Radnički Kragujevac	(Serbia) Ivica Vukotić	(Serbia) Raško Katić	Seven	City of Kragujevac
Zlatibor	(Serbia) Strajin Nedović	(Serbia) Dušan Kutlešić	Ardu Sport	—

== Venue ==
On 23 December 2021, it was announced that the tournament will be held in Niš. It is the 12th time in total and first time after two years that will be held in Niš.

Niš	2021–22 Radivoj Korać Cup (Serbia)
Čair Sports Center	2021–22 Radivoj Korać Cup (Serbia)
Capacity: 5,000	2021–22 Radivoj Korać Cup (Serbia)

== Draw ==
The draw was conducted on Monday 31 January 2022 at the Arena Sport live show. It was held by Serbia national team head coaches Marina Maljković and Svetislav Pešić, the Mayor of Niš Dragana Sotirovski, and the Triglav Serbia CEO Dragan Marković.

Seeded teams Crvena zvezda mts Partizan NIS FMP Meridian Mega Mozzart	Non-seeded teams Borac Čačak^{1} Zlatibor Borac Zemun Radnički Kragujevac

^{1} The lowest ABA League position after 13 rounds played

== Bracket ==
Quarterfinals
17 February
Crvena zvezda mts	103
Radnički Kragujevac	59
17 February
Mega Mozzart	84
Zlatibor	57
18 February
Partizan NIS	101
Borac Zemun	48
18 February
FMP Meridian	88
Borac Čačak	77

Semifinals
19 February
Crvena zvezda mts	72
Mega Mozzart	53
19 February
Partizan NIS	92
FMP Meridian	89

Final
20 February
Crvena zvezda mts	85
Partizan NIS	68

== Quarterfinals ==
All times are local UTC+1.

=== Crvena zvezda mts v Radnički Kragujevac ===
17 February 2022
18:00

Boxscore

Crvena zvezda mts	103–59	Radnički Kragujevac
Scoring by quarter: 28–13, 29–11, 24–22, 22–13
Pts: Stefan Marković 16; Rebs: Kuzmić, White 6 Asts: Nikola Ivanović 6		Pts: Raško Katić 17; Rebs: Lazar Stanković 8 Asts: Raško Katić 5

Čair Sports Center, Niš
Attendance: 500
Referees: Milivoje Jovčić, Nemanja Ninković, Petar Pešić

=== Mega Mozzart v Zlatibor ===
17 February 2022
21:00

Boxscore

Mega Mozzart	84–57	Zlatibor
Scoring by quarter: 19–20, 22–9, 21–18, 22–10
Pts: Boriša Simanić 15; Rebs: Karlo Matković 11; Asts: Jović, Smith 5		Pts: Dušan Kutlešić 17; Rebs: Dimitrije Nikolić 8 Asts: Tadija Tadić 7

Čair Sports Center, Niš
Attendance: 500
Referees: Uroš Obrknežević, Ivan Stefanović, Stefan Ćalić

=== FMP Meridian v Borac Čačak ===
18 February 2022
18:00

Boxscore

FMP Meridian	88–77	Borac Čačak
Scoring by quarter: 19–8, 20–18, 23–18, 26–33
Pts: Danilo Tasić 19; Rebs: Šaranović, Tasić 8 Asts: Bryce Jones 13		Pts: Marko Pecarski 18; Rebs: López, Pecarski 7 Asts: Lautaro López 5

Čair Sports Center, Niš
Attendance: 1,000
Referees: Ilija Belošević, Aleksandar Glišić, Vladimir Jevtović

=== Partizan NIS v Borac Zemun ===
18 February 2022
21:00

Boxscore

Partizan NIS	101–48	Borac Zemun
Scoring by quarter: 22–12, 25–18, 26–9, 28–9
Pts: Tristan Vukčević 16; Rebs: Nemanja Dangubić 8 Asts: Dangubić, Avramović 6		Pts: Stefan Balmazović 15; Rebs: Stefan Sinovec 5 Asts: Stefan Sinovec 5

Čair Sports Center, Niš
Attendance: 3,000
Referees: Marko Juras, Jasmina Juras, Siniša Prpa

== Semifinals ==
=== Crvena zvezda mts v Mega Mozzart ===
19 February 2022
17:00

Boxscore

Crvena zvezda mts	72–53	Mega Mozzart
Scoring by quarter: 15–21, 24–12, 17–14, 16–6
Pts: Nikola Kalinić 15; Rebs: Ognjen Kuzmić 7 Asts: Nate Wolters 5		Pts: Karlo Matković 15; Rebs: Luka Cerovina 6 Asts: Scoochie Smith 7

Čair Sports Center, Niš
Attendance: 3,500
Referees: Milivoje Jovčić, Aleksandar Glišić, Ivan Stefanović

It was the 300th win for Montenegrin head coach Dejan Radonjić on the Crvena zvezda bench.

=== Partizan NIS v FMP Meridian ===
February 2022
21:00

Boxscore

Partizan NIS	92–89	FMP Meridian
Scoring by quarter: 21−24, 31−19, 21−17, 19−29
Pts: Kevin Punter 29; Rebs: Balša Koprivica 6 Asts: Punter, Moore 4		Pts: Bryce Jones 29; Rebs: Ebuka Izundu 10; Asts: Bryce Jones 13

Čair Sports Center, Niš
Attendance: 3,500
Referees: Uroš Obrknežević, Marko Juras, Siniša Prpa

== Final ==
The defending champion Crvena zvezda has current 5-in-a-row sequence in the Radivoj Korać Cup Final, as well as the eight match overall facing eternal rival Partizan. Partizan won five times in the Final including the last three, while Crvena zvezda won two times.

20 February 2022
21:00

Boxscore

Crvena zvezda mts	85–68	Partizan NIS
Scoring by quarter: 20–13, 29–15, 18–18, 18–22
Pts: Nikola Kalinić 18; Rebs: Ognjen Kuzmić 7 Asts: Austin Hollins 5		Pts: Mathias Lessort 19; Rebs: Lessort, Leday 4 Asts: Dallas Moore 5

Čair Sports Center, Niš
Attendance: 5,000
Referees: Milivoje Jovčić, Uroš Obrknežević, Aleksandar Glišić

Starters:			Pts	Reb	Ast
PG	3	(United States) Nate Wolters	14	4	4
SG	14	(United States) Austin Hollins	15	1	5
F	7	(Serbia) Dejan Davidovac	3	5	1
F	12	(Serbia) Nikola Kalinić	18	3	4
C	32	(Serbia) Ognjen Kuzmić	5	7	1
Reserves:					
G/F	2	(Serbia) Stefan Lazarević	0	0	0
F/C	9	(Serbia) Luka Mitrović	4	2	1
G/F	10	(Serbia) Branko Lazić	0	0	0
G/F	13	(Serbia) Ognjen Dobrić	9	3	4
PG	20	(Montenegro) Nikola Ivanović	4	0	1
G	27	(Serbia) Stefan Marković	13	3	1
F	30	(United States) Aaron White	0	1	0
Head coach:
(Basketball Federation of Montenegro) Dejan Radonjić

CZV	PAR

CZV	Statistics	PAR
21/35 (60%)	2-pt field goals	18/30 (60%)
10/21 (47%)	3-pt field goals	5/17 (29%)
13/17 (76%)	Free throws	17/21 (80%)
8	Offensive rebounds	5
21	Defensive rebounds	18
29	Total rebounds	23
22	Assists	12
16	Turnovers	17
8	Steals	10
1	Blocks	2
22 (21)	Fouls	21 (22)

2021–22 Radivoj Korać Cup Champions
Crvena zvezda mts
8th title
MVP Award
(United States) Nate Wolters

Starters:			Pts	Reb	Ast
G	4	(Serbia) Aleksa Avramović	4	2	1
SG	0	(Serbia) Kevin Punter	14	2	3
SF	00	(Latvia) Rodions Kurucs	9	3	1
F/C	2	(United States) Zach Leday	10	4	0
C	5	(Serbia) Balša Koprivica	0	3	1
Reserves:					
PF	1	(Serbia) Tristan Vukčević	DNP		
SF	3	(Serbia) Rade Zagorac	DNP		
SF	6	(Serbia) Nemanja Dangubić	0	0	0
C	11	(Serbia) Dušan Miletić	DNP		
G	14	(Albania) Dallas Moore	11	3	5
C	26	(France) Mathias Lessort	19	4	1
G	32	(Serbia) Uroš Trifunović	1	1	0
Head coach:
(Basketball Federation of Serbia) Željko Obradović

== See also ==
- 2021–22 Basketball League of Serbia
- 2021–22 KK Crvena zvezda season
- 2021–22 KK Partizan season
- 2021–22 Milan Ciga Vasojević Cup
