= 2021–22 Basketball Cup of Serbia =

2021–22 Cup of Serbia
- Season: 2021–22
- Duration: 21 December 2021 – 19 January 2022
- Games played: 7
- Teams: 8

Finals
- Champions: Borac Zemun (1st title)
- Runners-up: Radnički Kragujevac
- Semi-finalists: Metalac; Joker

The 2021–22 Basketball Cup of Serbia is the 16th season of the Serbian 2nd-tier men's cup tournament.

Finalists Borac Zemun and Radnički Kragujevac got qualified for the 2022 Radivoj Korać Cup. In the final, Borac won over Radnički.

== Bracket ==
Quarterfinals
21 December 2021
Radnik	67
Radnički Kragujevac	74
28 December 2021
Metalac	79
Vojvodina	73
25 December 2021
Borac Zemun	93
Pirot	86
15 December 2021
Joker	85
Beko	77

Semifinals
12 January 2022
Radnički Kragujevac	94
Metalac	82
12 January 2022
Borac Zemun	98
Joker	84

Final
19 January 2022
Radnički Kragujevac	79
Borac Zemun	86

Source: srbijasport.net

== Quarterfinals ==
All times are local UTC+1.

=== Radnik v Radnički Kragujevac ===
21 December 2021
19:00

Boxscore

Radnik	67–74	Radnički Kragujevac
Scoring by quarter: 13–23, 18–8, 10–19, 26–24
Pts: Milan Škundrić 18; Rebs: Škundrić, Karalić 8 Asts: Luka Petrović 5		Pts: Stefan Mitrović 21; Rebs: Marko Ilić 13; Asts: Filip Dumić 8

Surdulica Hall, Surdulica
Attendance: 200
Referees: Ivan Ilić, Stefan Zdravković, D. Stamenković

=== Metalac v Vojvodina ===
28 December 2021
19:00

Boxscore

Metalac	79–73	Vojvodina
Scoring by quarter: 23–19, 25–25, 13–20, 18–9
Pts: Feđa Pajović 17; Rebs: Nikola Pavić 10; Asts: Nikola Žižić 5		Pts: Dušan Beslać 20; Rebs: Petar Rakićević 11; Asts: Rakićević, Ljubičić 3

Valjevo Sports Hall, Valjevo
Attendance: 150
Referees: Nemanja Ninković, Stefan Calić, Ljubomir Marković

=== Borac Zemun v Pirot ===
25 December 2021
16:00

Boxscore

Borac Zemun	93–86	Pirot
Pts: Stefan Balmazović 34; Rebs: Filip Branković 9 Asts: Trajković, Miculović 5		Pts: Vladimir Vranić 23; Rebs: Vladimir Vranić 7 Asts: Nikola Đonlić 14

Pinki Hall, Belgrade
Attendance: 100
Referees: Miloš Hadžić, Vladimir Tomić, S. Rakić

=== Joker v Beko ===
15 December 2021
18:00

Boxscore

Joker	85–77	Beko
Scoring by quarter: 19–22, 22–18, 27–22, 17–15
Pts: Zoran Krstanović 27; Rebs: Zoran Krstanović 10; Asts: Luka Igrutinović 4		Pts: Filip Borovićanin 23; Rebs: Borovićanin, Kitanović 7 Asts: Filip Borovićanin 6

Mostonga Hall, Sombor
Attendance: 150
Referees: A. Arsić, S. Olćan, D. Batinić

== Semifinals ==
All times are local UTC+1.

=== Metalac v Radnički Kragujevac ===
12 January 2022
19:00

Boxscore

Metalac	82–94	Radnički Kragujevac
Scoring by quarter: 12–25, 29–27, 23–18, 18–24
Pts: Nikola Pavić 20; Rebs: Milenko Veljković 9 Asts: Nikola Pavić 7		Pts: Filip Dumić 26; Rebs: Filip Dumić 9 Asts: Filip Dumić 8

Valjevo Sports Hall, Valjevo
Attendance: 300
Referees: Marko Strika, Petar Pešić, Nemanja Vlahović

=== Joker v Borac Zemun ===
12 January 2022
18:00

Boxscore

Joker	84–98	Borac Zemun
Scoring by quarter: 21–26, 18–26, 20–26, 25–20
Pts: Brbaklić, Krstanović 17; Rebs: Aleksa Brbaklić 9 Asts: Luka Igrutinović 3		Pts: Nino Celebić 28; Rebs: Stefan Sinovec 7 Asts: Nino Celebić 9

Mostonga Hall, Sombor
Attendance: 200
Referees: Ljubomir Marković, S. Olćan, S. Rakić

== Final ==
19 January 2022
19:30

Boxscore

Borac Zemun	86–79	Radnički Kragujevac
Scoring by quarter: 24–10, 27–26, 19–22, 16–21
Pts: Stefan Sinovec 22; Rebs: Stefan Sinovec 8 Asts: Vukosavljević, Miculović 3		Pts: Ivan Nedeljković 22; Rebs: Raško Katić 12; Asts: Raičević, Katić 5

Pinki Hall, Belgrade
Attendance: 100
Referees: Dejan Mizdrak, Đorđe Bogojević, M. Kostić

== See also ==
- 2021–22 Radivoj Korać Cup
- 2021–22 Second Men's League of Serbia
- 2021–22 Basketball League of Serbia
