= Lazar Vasić =

Serbian basketball player (born 2001)

Vršac
- Position: Point guard
- League: Basketball League of Serbia

Personal information
- Born: January 3, 2001 (age 25) Belgrade, Serbia, FR Yugoslavia
- Listed height: 1.91 m (6 ft 3 in)
- Listed weight: 82 kg (181 lb)

Career information
- Playing career: 2019–present

Career history
- 2019–present: Crvena zvezda mts
- 2019–2020: → Tamiš
- 2020–2021: → FMP
- 2021–2022: → Slodes
- 2022–present: → Vršac
Medals
Men's basketball
Representing Serbia
FIBA Europe Under-16 Championship
Bronze medal – third place	2017 Montenegro	U16 team

Lazar Vasić (Serbian Cyrillic: Лазар Васић; born January 3, 2001) is a Serbian professional basketball player who currently plays for Vršac of the Basketball League of Serbia as a loaned player of Crvena zvezda mts.

== Early career ==
Vasić started to play basketball for KK Abba from Barič. In summer 2014, he was added to the Crvena zvezda youth team. He won the second place at the 2017–18 Junior ABA League season with the Zvezda. Over six tournament games, he averaged 6.5 points, 4.0 rebounds and 3.3 assists per game.

== Professional career ==
In January 2018, Vasić was added to the Crvena zvezda ABA League roster for the rest of the 2017–18 season. He missed to play a single game during that season. On February 13, 2019, Vasić was added to the 2019 Crvena zvezda Radivoj Korać Cup roster. He missed to play a single game at the Cup tournament. On March 19, 2019, Vasić signed his first professional contract for Crvena zvezda. On 4 September 2019, he was loaned to Tamiš for the 2019–20 season. Prior to the 2020–21 season, Vasić was added to the roster of FMP. In December 2020, he was added to the ABA roster.

== National team career ==
Vasić was a member of the Serbian under-16 national team that participated at the 2016 FIBA Europe Under-16 Championship in Poland. Over seven tournament games, he averaged 0.6 points, 1.6 rebounds and 1.7 assists per game. Next year, he was a member of the team that won the bronze medal at the 2017 FIBA Europe Under-16 Championship in Montenegro. Over seven tournament games, he averaged 5.0 points, 1.7 rebounds and 2.1 assists per game.

Vasić was a member of the Serbian under-17 team that participated at the 2018 FIBA Under-17 Basketball World Cup in Argentina. Over seven tournament games, he averaged 4.7 points, 2.0 rebounds and 3.1 assists per game.
