= Luka Igrutinović =

Serbian basketball player

Joker
- Position: Point guard

Personal information
- Born: February 15, 1992 (age 34) Kragujevac, SR Serbia, SFR Yugoslavia
- Listed height: 1.93 m (6 ft 4 in)
- Listed weight: 82 kg (181 lb)

Career information
- NBA draft: 2014: undrafted
- Playing career: 2010–present

Career history
- 2010: Superfund
- 2010–2011: Šumadija
- 2011–2012: Proleter Naftagas
- 2012–2013: BKK Radnički
- 2013–2014: Napredak Rubin
- 2014–2015: Levickí Patrioti
- 2015: Rieker Komárno
- 2015: Prievidza
- 2015–2016: Nova Hut Ostrava
- 2016–2017: Sluneta Ústí nad Labem
- 2017: Sloga
- 2017–2018: Zrinjski
- 2018–2019: Spartak Subotica
- 2019–2020: Geosan Kolín
- 2020–2021: Bosna Royal
- 2021: Rogaška
- 2021–present: Joker
Medals
Men's basketball
Representing Serbia
U19 World Championship
| Silver medal – second place | 2011 Latvia | U19 Team |

Luka Igrutinović (Serbian Cyrillic: Лука Игрутиновић; born 15 February 1992) is a Serbian professional basketball player for Joker.

== Career achievements ==
- Bosnian League champion: 1 (with Zrinjski: 2017–18)
- Slovak Basketball League champion: 1 (with MBK Rieker Komarno: 2014–15)
- Best scorer Slovak Basketball League (2014–15)
- Best scorer 2015–16 National Basketball League (Czech Republic) season
