= Nikola Manojlović (basketball) =

Serbian basketball player (born 2002)

- Manojlović in 2026

No. 55 – Igokea
- Position: Shooting guard / small forward
- League: Bosnian League; ABA League; Basketball Champions League

Personal information
- Born: 14 February 2002 (age 24) Sydney, New South Wales, Australia
- Listed height: 2.01 m (6 ft 7 in)
- Listed weight: 95 kg (209 lb)

Career information
- Playing career: 2020–present

Career history
- 2020–present: Crvena zvezda mts
- 2020–2021: → Tamiš
- 2021: → Slodes
- 2022-2023: → FMP
- 2023–2026: Borac Čačak
- 2026–present: Igokea
Medals
Men's basketball
Representing Serbia
U20 European Championship Division B
Gold medal – first place	2022 Georgia	Team

Nikola Manojlović (Serbian Cyrillic: Никола Манојловић; born 14 February 2002) is a Serbian professional basketball player for Igokea of the Bosnian League and the ABA League and Basketball Champions League (BCL).

== Professional career ==
Born in Sydney, Manojlović grew up in the Belgrade-based Crvena zvezda youth system. On 27 February 2020, Manojlović signed his first professional contract for Crvena zvezda mts. In September 2020, he was loaned to Tamiš for the 2020–21 BLS season. Prior to the 2021–22 season, Manojlović was added to the roster of Slodes. Afterwards, he was loaned to FMP on 28 December 2021.

On June 20, 2026, he signed with Igokea of the Bosnian League and the ABA League.

== National team career ==
In August 2018, Manojlović was a member of the Serbian under-16 national team that participated at the FIBA U16 European Championship in Novi Sad, Serbia. Over seven tournament games, he averaged 14 points, 5.1 rebounds, and 1.9 assists per game. In July/August 2019, Manojlović was a member of the Serbian under-18 national team that participated at the FIBA U18 European Championship in Volos, Greece. Over seven tournament games, he averaged 0.6 points, 1.6 rebounds, and 1.7 assists per game.

In July 2022, Manojlović was a member of the Serbian under-20 national team that won a gold medal at the 2022 FIBA U20 European Championship Division B in Tbilisi, Georgia. Over seven tournament games, he averaged 7.6 points, 3.6 rebounds, and 3.1 assists per game.
