= Matija Radović =

Serbian basketball player

No. 13 – Slodes SoccerBet
- Position: Shooting guard
- League: Basketball League of Serbia

Personal information
- Born: April 25, 1998 (age 28) Belgrade, Serbia, FR Yugoslavia
- Listed height: 2.01 m (6 ft 7 in)
- Listed weight: 93 kg (205 lb)

Career information
- High school: Montverde Academy (Montverde, Florida)
- College: Hofstra (2017–2019); American International (2019–2020)
- NBA draft: 2020: undrafted
- Playing career: 2020–present

Career history
- 2020–2021: Mladost Zemun
- 2021–present: Slodes

Matija Radović (Serbian Cyrillic: Матија Радовић, born April 25, 1998) is a Serbian professional basketball player for Slodes SoccerBet of the Basketball League of Serbia. He played college basketball for the Hofstra Pride and the American International Yellow Jackets.

== Early career ==
Radović started to play basketball for the Crvena zvezda youth system. Radović played in the 2015–16 season Finals of Euroleague NGT where he recorded 18 points. In July 2016, he had moved to the United States, to Montverde Academy in Montverde, Florida where he played as a senior.

== College career ==
In June 2017, the Hofstra Pride added Radović to their roster. As a freshman, Radović appeared in 25 games at the Hofstra Pride in their 2017–18 season. In the freshman season, he averaged 2.2 points and 1.8 rebounds per game. In 2019, Radović moved to the American International Yellow Jackets for his junior season.

== Professional career ==
In August 2020, Radović signed for Mladost Zemun.

== International career ==
Radović was a member of the Serbia national U16 team that played at the 2014 FIBA Europe Under-16 Championship. Over nine tournament games, he averaged 7.0 points, 3.7 rebounds and 1.8 assists per game.
