= Bogdan Riznić =

Serbian basketball player (born 1990)

Žitko Basket
- Position: Shooting guard / small forward
- League: Second Basketball League of Serbia

Personal information
- Born: 24 February 1990 (age 36) Belgrade, SR Serbia, SFR Yugoslavia
- Listed height: 2.01 m (6 ft 7 in)

Career information
- NBA draft: 2012: undrafted
- Playing career: 2008–present

Career history
- 2008–2009: Partizan
- 2009–2010: Konstantin
- 2010–2011: Vojvodina Srbijagas
- 2012–2013: Radnički Belgrade
- 2013–2014: Radnik Bijeljina
- 2014: Mladost Mrkonjić Grad
- 2015: Illiabum
- 2015–2016: Lusitânia
- 2016: SPU Nitra
- 2017: Terceira Basket
- 2017–2021: Zlatibor
- 2022: Slodes
- 2022–present: Žitko Basket

Career highlights
- Serbian League champion (2009); Serbian Cup champion (2009); Adriatic League champion (2009)

Bogdan Riznić (born 24 February 1990) is a Serbian professional basketball player for Žitko Basket.

Riznić played in Partizan in 2008–09 season and won Adriatic League, Radivoj Korać Cup and Basketball League of Serbia.
