= Yiğit Onan =

Turkish basketball player (born 2002)

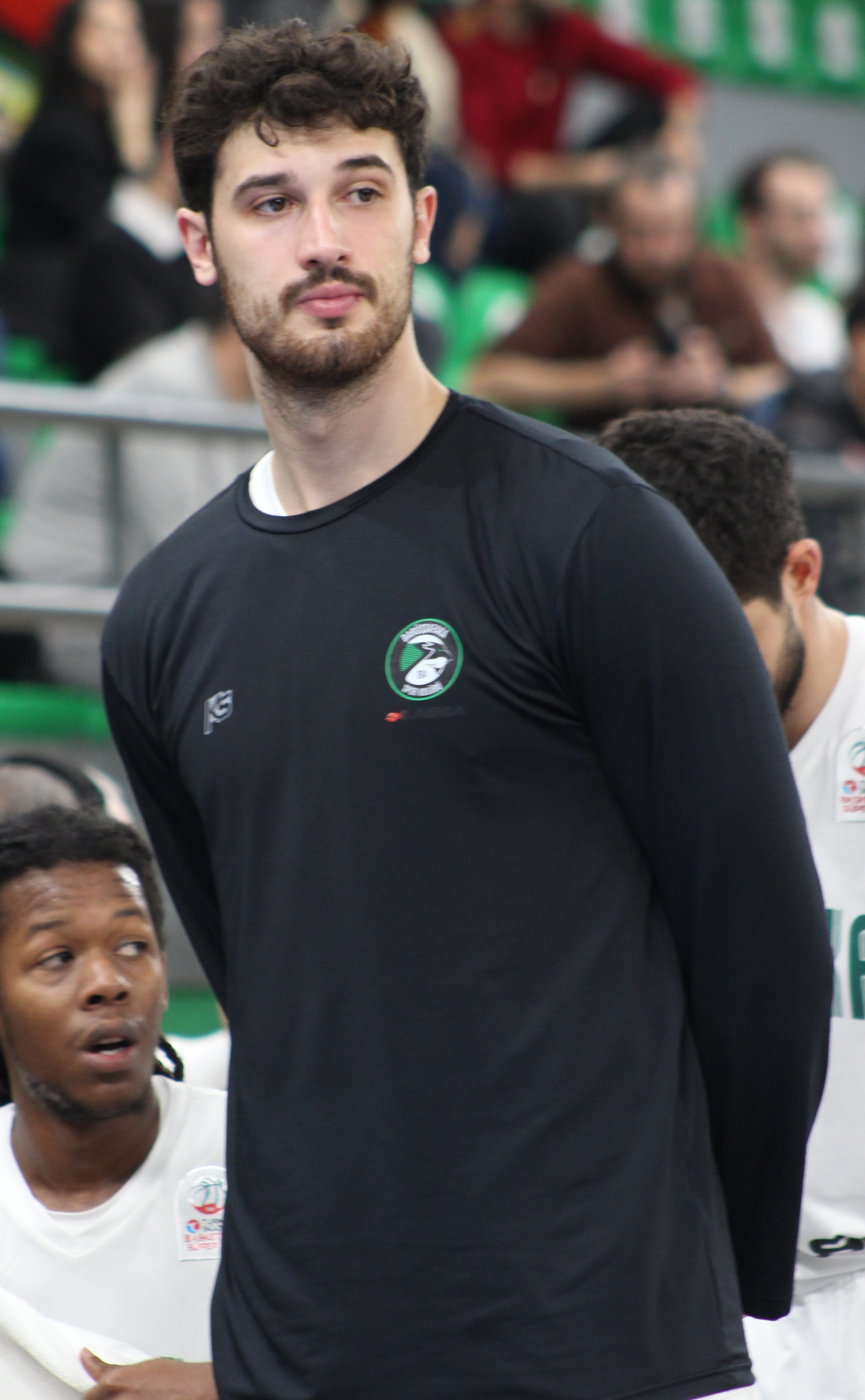

No. 7 – Petkim Spor
- Position: Small forward / power forward
- League: BSL

Personal information
- Born: July 12, 2002 (age 24) Istanbul, Turkey
- Listed height: 2.08 m (6 ft 10 in)
- Listed weight: 98 kg (216 lb)

Career information
- Playing career: 2020–present

Career history
- 2020–2021: Fenerbahçe Beko
- 2021–2022: Dynamic Belgrade
- 2022–2023: Beşiktaş
- 2023–2024: Gaziantep Basketbol
- 2024–2025: Darüşşafaka
- 2025: Yalovaspor Basketbol
- 2025–2026: Manisa Basket
- 2026–present: Petkim Spor

Yiğit Onan (born July 12, 2002) is a Turkish professional basketball player for Petkim Spor of the Basketbol Süper Ligi (BSL).

== Professional career ==
Onan started his professional career at Fenerbahçe Beko in 2020–21 season.

On August 17, 2021, he has signed with Dynamic Belgrade of the Basketball League of Serbia.

On August 4, 2022, he has signed with Beşiktaş of the Basketbol Süper Ligi (BSL).

On July 28, 2023, he signed with Gaziantep Basketbol of the Turkish Basketball First League (TBL).

On June 23, 2024, he signed with Darüşşafaka of the Basketbol Süper Ligi (BSL).

On January 21, 2025, he signed with Yalovaspor Basketbol of the Basketbol Süper Ligi (BSL).

On August 9, 2025, he signed with Manisa Basket of the Basketbol Süper Ligi (BSL).

On May 30, 2026, he signed with Petkim Spor of the Basketbol Süper Ligi (BSL).

== Personal life ==
Yiğit is the son of Ömer Onan, a former professional basketball player for the Efes Pilsen and Fenerbahçe.
