= Stefan Sinovec =

Serbian basketball player (born 1988)

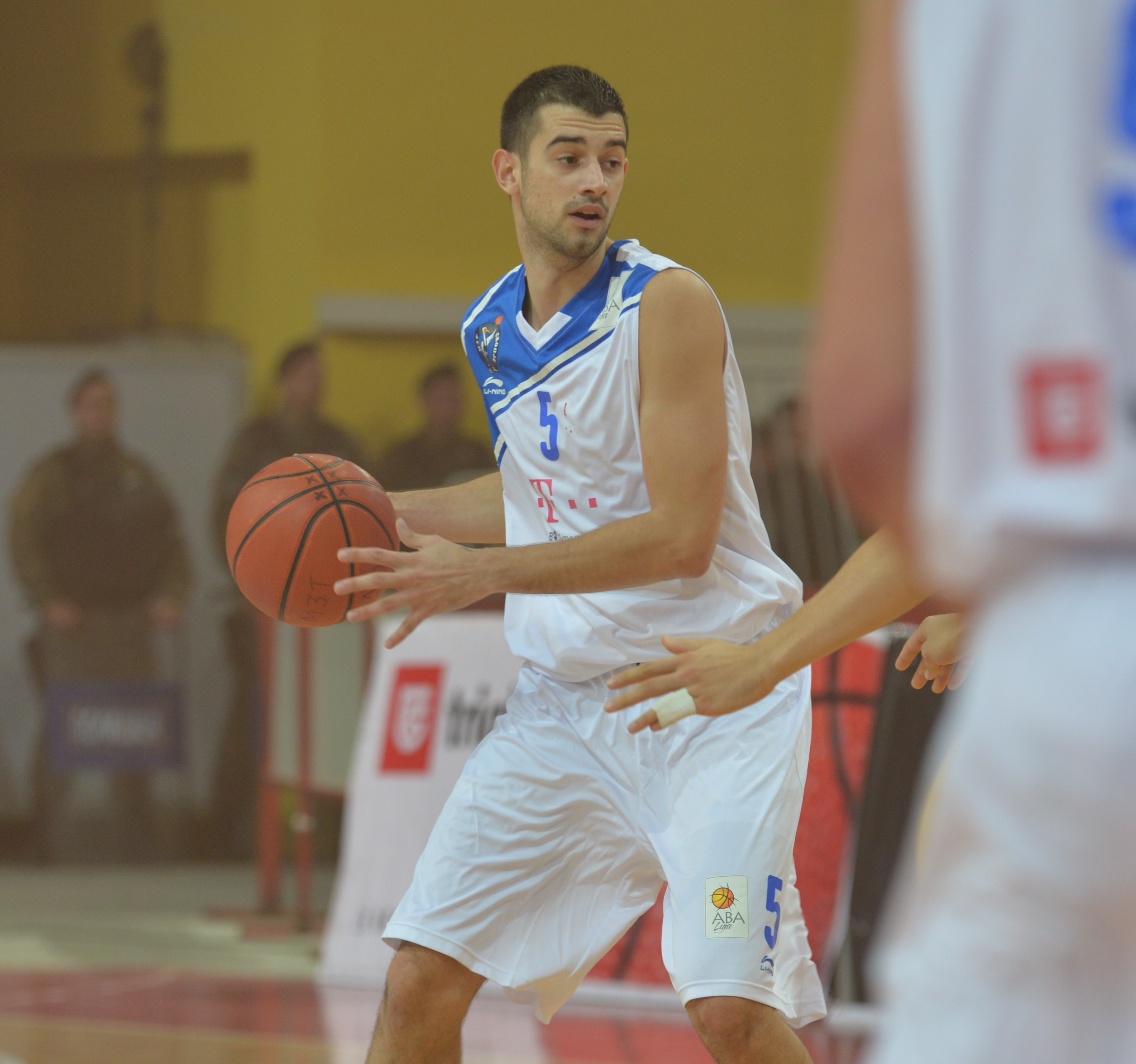
- Sinovec with MZT in October 2013

Personal information
- Born: 20 June 1988 (age 38) Belgrade, SR Serbia, SFR Yugoslavia
- Listed height: 1.95 m (6 ft 5 in)
- Listed weight: 88 kg (194 lb)

Career information
- Playing career: 2005–present
- Position: Shooting guard

Career history
- 2005–2009: Vizura
- 2009: Khimik
- 2009–2010: Partizan
- 2010–2011: Metalac
- 2011–2013: Radnički Kragujevac
- 2013–2014: MZT Skopje
- 2014: Szolnoki Olaj
- 2014–2015: MZT Skopje
- 2015–2016: Krka
- 2016–2017: MZT Skopje
- 2017–2018: Mega
- 2018: MZT Skopje
- 2018–2019: Lietkabelis
- 2020: Liepājas Lauvas
- 2020–2021: Kaposvári KK
- 2021: Metalac
- 2021–2022: Borac Zemun
- 2022–2023: Šibenka
- 2023–2024: Metalac

Career highlights
- Adriatic League champion (2010); Serbian League champion (2010); 3× Macedonian League champion (2014, 2015, 2017); Serbian Cup winner (2010); Macedonian Cup winner (2014); Slovenian Cup winner (2016); Serbian League Cup winner (2022)
Medals
Men's basketball
Representing Serbia
U20 European Championship
Gold medal – first place	2008 Latvia	U20 National Team

Stefan Sinovec (Serbian: Стефан Синовец, born 20 June 1988) is a Serbian professional basketball player who last played for Metalac.

== Pro career ==
Sinovec grew up with Ušće Vizura Belgrade juniors and made his debut with Vizura during the 2005–06 season. He played there till February 2009, when he moved to Ukraine and signed for the remainder of the season by Khimik.

He returned to Serbia for the 2009–10 season and signed with Partizan. For the 2010–11 season he moved to Metalac Valjevo. In 2011 he goes to Radnički Kragujevac.

In July 2013, he signed a one-year deal with the Macedonian club MZT Skopje and won the Macedonian League and Macedonian Cup. In June 2014, he signed with Szolnoki Olaj KK of Hungary for the 2014–15 season. In December 2014, he left Szolnoki and signed with his former team MZT Skopje. For the 2015–16 season he moved to Krka.

In October 2016, Sinovec returned to MZT Skopje for the 2016–17 season.

On 4 September 2017 Sinovec signed with Mega Bemax.

On 19 March 2018 he left Mega Bemax and signed with MZT Skopje.

In August 2020, Sinovec signed a one-year contract with Hungarian club Kaposvári KK that plays in the NB I/A. In January 2021, he signed back to Metalac.

In March 2022, he signed for GKK Šibenka for the rest of the 2021–22 season.
