= Siniša Matić =

Serbian basketball coach

Personal information
- Born: 13 March 1967 (age 59) Zemun, SR Serbia, SFR Yugoslavia
- Position: Head coach
- Coaching career: 1998–present

Career history

Coaching
- 1998–2008: Zemun (youth)
- 2008–2009: Zemun Lasta
- 2009–2010: Novi Sad (youth)
- 2010–2011: Novi Sad
- 2011–2013: Vojvodina Srbijagas
- 2013–2014: Metalac Valjevo
- 2015–2016: Karpoš Sokoli
- 2021–2022: Borac Zemun
- 2022: Vršac

Career highlights
- Serbian League Cup winner (2022)

Siniša Matić (Serbian Cyrillic: Синиша Матић; born 13 March 1967) is a Serbian professional basketball coach.

== Coaching career ==
Matić coached Zemun Lasta, Novi Sad, Vojvodina Srbijagas, Metalac Valjevo, and Karpoš Sokoli. In summer 2021, he joined his hometown team Borac Zemun. In March 2022, Vršac hired Matić as their new head coach.
