= Stevan Karadžić =

Montenegrin basketball player and coach

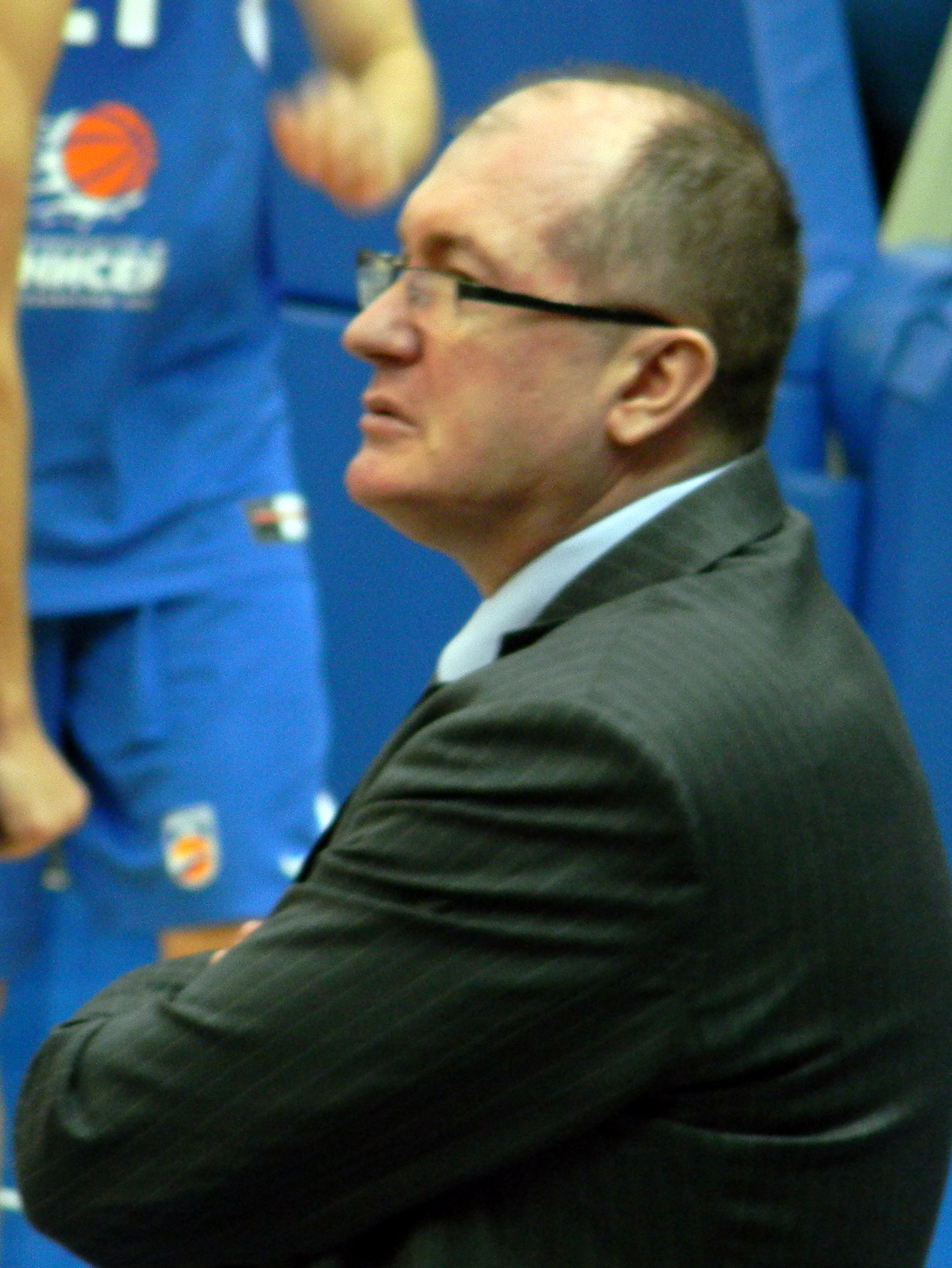
- Karadžić coaching Yenisey Krasnoyarsk in March 2011

Sopron Basket
- Title: Assistant coach
- League: EuroLeague Women

Personal information
- Born: 16 November 1960 (age 65) Nikšić, PR Montenegro, FPR Yugoslavia
- Listed height: 1.97 m (6 ft 6 in)

Career information
- NBA draft: 1982: undrafted
- Playing career: 1975–1995
- Position: Guard
- Number: 9, 11
- Coaching career: 1996–present

Career history

Playing
- 1975–1978: Radnički Novi Sad
- 1978–1980: Puljanka
- 1980–1989: Crvena zvezda
- 1989–1990: Gradine Pula
- 1990–1991: Sloboda Tuzla
- 1991–1992: Borac Banja Luka
- 1992–1993: Ebon
- 1993–1995: Sopron

Coaching
- 1996–1998: Crvena zvezda Ladies
- 1996–1999: Crvena zvezda Youth
- 1999–2000: Crvena zvezda (assistant)
- 2000–2001: Crvena zvezda
- 2005–2007: Crvena zvezda (assistant)
- 2007–2008: Crvena zvezda
- 2008–2010: Hemofarm
- 2010–2012, 2013–2015: Yenisey Krasnoyarsk
- 2017: Serbia (women's)
- 2020–present: Sopron Basket (assistant coach) (women's)
Medals
Men's basketball
Assistant coach for FR Yugoslavia
World Championship
Gold medal – first place	2002 USA
Head coach for FR Yugoslavia/Serbia and Montenegro
Europe Under-18 Championship
Gold medal – first place	2005 Serbia and Montenegro	Team
European Championship for Cadets
Gold medal – first place	2001 Latvia	Team

Stevan Karadžić (Serbian Cyrillic: Стеван Караџић; born 16 November 1960) is a Serbian-Montenegrin professional basketball coach and former player. He currently serves as an assistant coach for Sopron Basket, the 2021–22 EuroLeague Women champions.

== Early life ==
He was born 16 November 1960 in Nikšić, SR Montenegro, SFR Yugoslavia.

== Playing career ==
Most of his playing career Karadžić spent in the Crvena zvezda. Between 1980 and 1989 he had played 296 matches and scored 3484 points (an average of 11.8 points per game). Karadzic played in the play-off final (1984 and 1985) and the final of the European Korać Cup in 1984. Best game Karadžić for Crvena zvezda is considered to be 1983/84 season, when he was named the top scorer of the season, scoring 642 points in 43 matches (an average of 14.9 points per game).

In addition to Crvena zvezda Karadžić played for Radnički Novi Sad, Puljanka and Gradine from Pula, Sloboda Tuzla and Borac Banja Luka in Bosnia and Herzegovina, Ebon from Nikšić and the Hungarian Soproni.

== Coaching career ==
After finishing playing career, Karadžić devoted himself to coaching. He traveled as a coach of youth Crvena zvezda which became the champion of Serbia and Yugoslavia in 1998. In 1999, Karadžić led the Crvena zvezda, but was fired in 2001. Karadžić has returned to his post in the second half of the season 2006/2007, but the following season was once again fired.

Karadžić has coached Under-16 and Under-18 Yugoslavia national teams that took gold at the European championships in 2001 and 2005 respectively. As an assistant coach of Yugoslavia won gold at the 2002 World Championships in Indianapolis. From 2008 to 2010 he was head of the Serbian Hemofarm. In 2009 he was recognized as the best coach in the European Cup. Since 2010 to 2012, Karadžić led the Russian basketball club Yenisey, which back in 2013.

== Personal life ==
His wife, Vesna Karadžić, is a former basketball player. The couple has two children - a daughter, Tamara (played for the Crvena zvezda women's team), and a son, Vuk, who also played basketball.

== See also ==
- List of Red Star Belgrade basketball coaches
- List of KK Crvena zvezda players with 100 games played
