= Vuk Karadžić (basketball) =

Serbian Professional Basketball player

No. 14 – KK Dynamic
- Position: Guard
- League: Basketball League of Serbia

Personal information
- Born: June 24, 1996 (age 30) Belgrade, FR Yugoslavia
- Listed height: 1.96 m (6 ft 5 in)
- Listed weight: 85 kg (187 lb)

Career information
- NBA draft: 2018: undrafted
- Playing career: 2015–present

Career history
- 2015–2016: OKK Beograd
- 2016–2017: KK Smederevo 1953
- 2017: Radnički Kragujevac
- 2018: KK Spartak Subotica
- 2018–2019: Mladost Zemun
- 2019–2020: Radnički Beograd
- 2020–2022: KK Slodes
- 2022–present: KK Dynamic
Medals
Men's basketball
Representing Serbia
U18 European Championship
Silver medal – second place	2014 Turkey	U18 Team

Vuk Karadžić (Serbian Cyrillic: Вук Караџић, born June 24, 1996) is a Serbian professional basketball player for KK Dynamic Belgrade of the Basketball League of Serbia.

== Professional career ==
Karadžić played for OKK Beograd, Smederevo 1953 and Kragujevački Radnički.

In February 2018, he joined Spartak Subotica. On February 21, he made his debut for the Spartak in a game against Dunav Stari Banovci.

== International career ==
Karadžić was a member of the Serbian U-18 national basketball team that won the silver medal at the 2014 FIBA Europe Under-18 Championship.

== Personal life ==
His father Stevan Karadžić is a professional basketball coach and former player. His mother Vesna Karadžić is a former basketball player.
