= Pinki Hall =

Sports hall in Belgrade, Serbia

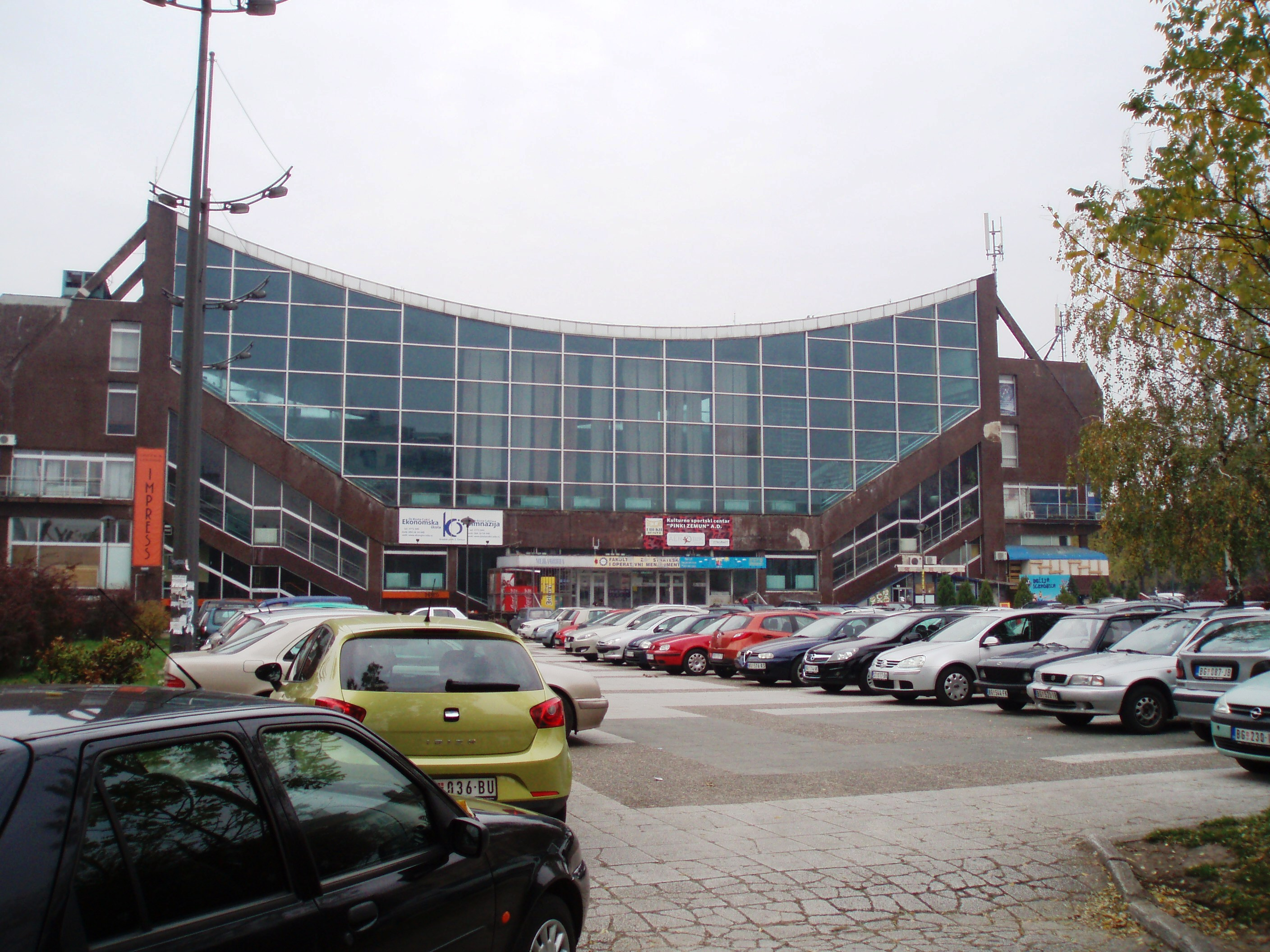
- Hala Pinki in November 2012.

- Location within Belgrade
- Full name: Kulturno sportski centar Pinki
- Former names: Dom sportova, omladine i pionira Pinki
- Location: Zemun, Belgrade, Serbia
- Coordinates: 44°50′25″N 20°24′38″E
- Owner: City of Belgrade (51%); NIS (49%)
- Operator: A.D. Kulturno-sportski centar Pinki Zemun
- Capacity: 5,000

Construction
- Opened: 21 October 1974; 52 years ago

Tenant
- KK Mladost Zemun

Pinki Cultural and Sports Center (Serbian Cyrillic: Културно-спортски центар Пинки), commonly known as Pinki Hall (Serbian Cyrillic: Хала Пинки), is an indoor multi-sports venue located in Belgrade's municipality of Zemun, Serbia. The venue has an indoor hall and an indoor swimming pool. The hall has a seating capacity of 2,300 for sports events and around 5,000 for concerts.

Opened on 21 October 1974, on the occasion of the 30th anniversary of Zemun being liberated from the Nazis and their puppet state Independent State of Croatia, the hall has hosted various basketball, handball, and volleyball teams. Its initial full official name was Dom sportova, omladine i pionira Pinki (Pinki Home of Sports, Youth and Pioneers). It now mostly serves for recreational use. It is the only sports venue in the city of Belgrade not financed by the city government, because Zemun's municipal government headed by the Serbian Radical Party (SRS) in 2000 transformed the venue's controlling entity into a publicly traded company and sold the controlling stake (49%) to Naftna industrija Srbije (NIS) oil company.

The venue is named after Boško Palkovljević Pinki, a prominent Partisan fighter during World War II in Yugoslavia and a People's Hero of Yugoslavia.

== Concerts ==
- 27 April 1975 - Bijelo Dugme (Kad bi bio bijelo dugme Tour)
- 1975 - Demis Roussos
- 22 March 1977 - Status Quo
- 4 April 1977 - Shakti
- 12 December 1978 - Riblja Čorba
- 9 February 1979 - John McLaughlin, Larry Coryell, and Paco de Lucía
- 27 April 1979 - Bijelo Dugme (Bitanga i princeza Tour)
- 4 November 1979 - John McLaughlin, Billy Cobham, Jack Bruce, and Stu Goldberg
- 2 December 1979 - Gillan
- December 1979 - Takmičenje pankera
- 29 January 1980 - The Ruts
- 21 March 1980 - Ginger Baker
- 2 April 1980 - Wishbone Ash
- 22 April 1980 - Lene Lovich
- 31 December 1981 - Bijelo Dugme (Doživjeti stotu Tour)
- 1 January 1982 - Bijelo Dugme
- 2 January 1982 - Bijelo Dugme
- 19 December 1982 - Dr. Feelgood
- 27 January 1983 - Alvin Lee
- 28 March 1983 - Pat Metheny Group
- 1 December 1983 - Uriah Heep
- 22 May 1984 - Laki Pingvini
- 17 January 1985 - Rory Gallagher
- 12 October 1989 - Rock za Bebe (Riblja Čorba; humanitarian concert for the maternity ward in Tiršova Street)

== See also ==
- List of indoor arenas in Serbia
