= Igor Mijajlović =

Serbian basketball player and coach

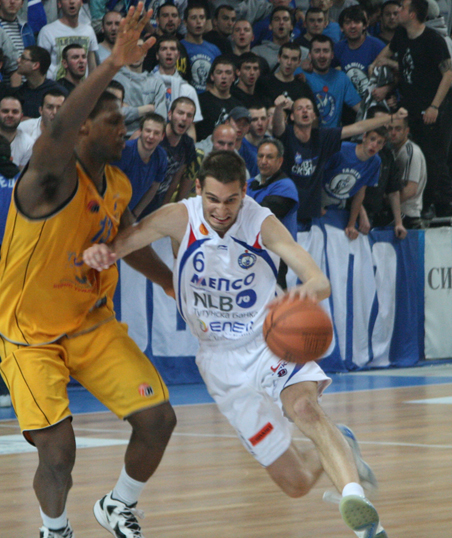
- with MZT in 2011

Personal information
- Born: July 3, 1984 (age 42) Belgrade, SR Serbia, SFR Yugoslavia
- Listed height: 1.92 m (6 ft 4 in)
- Listed weight: 80 kg (176 lb)

Career information
- Playing career: 2004–2023
- Position: Point guard / Shooting guard /
- Coaching career: 2023–present

Career history

Playing
- 2004–2007: Mašinac
- 2008: Mega Vizura
- 2009: Radnički KG 06
- 2009–2010: Otopeni
- 2011: Hopsi Polzela
- 2011–2012: MZT Skopje Aerodrom
- 2012–2014: Kožuv
- 2014–2015: Karpoš Sokoli
- 2015: Kaposvári KK
- 2015–2017: CSU Sibiu
- 2017–2018: Timișoara
- 2018–2019: SCM U Craiova
- 2019: AV Ohrid
- 2019–2020: Mladost Zemun
- 2020–2021: Timișoara
- 2021–2022: Metalac
- 2022–2023: Borac Zemun

Coaching
- 2023-2025: KK Sava U17
- 2025-2026: KK Dynamic U19
- 2026-: KK Dynamic

Career highlights
- Macedonian First League (2012); Macedonian Basketball Cup (2012)
Medals
Men's basketball
Representing Serbia
Summer Universiade
Silver medal – second place	Bangkok 2007	{{{2}}}
Club Competitions
Gold medal – first place	2012 Macedonian League	MZT Skopje
Gold medal – first place	2012 Macedonian Cup	MZT Skopje

Igor Mijajlović (Macedonian: Игор Мијајловиќ; born July 3, 1984) is a Serbian professional basketball coach and former basketball player. He is 1.92 m (6 ft 4 in) in height and plays at the point guard and shooting guard positions. After retiring from professional basketball in 2023 he transitioned into coaching.

== Career achievements ==
- KK MZT Skopje
  - Macedonian League Champion - 2012
    - Macedonian Cup Winner - 2012
    - Silver Medal Universiade games in Bangkok 2007 Sportski savez Srbije - Kategorizacija Sportista 2027
