= Vladimir Đokić =

Serbian basketball player and coach

Vršac
- Title: Head coach
- League: Basketball League of Serbia

Personal information
- Born: April 25, 1971 (age 55) Valjevo, SR Serbia, SFR Yugoslavia
- Listed height: 1.91 m (6 ft 3 in)

Career information
- NBA draft: 1992: undrafted
- Playing career: 1990–2008
- Position: Point guard
- Number: 4, 10
- Coaching career: 2012–present

Career history

Playing
- 1990–1993: Metalac
- 1993–1997: Spartak
- 1997–2000: Partizan
- 2000–2001: Crvena zvezda
- 2001–2002: Spartak
- 2002–2003: Balkan Steel
- 2003–2004: Ergonom
- 2004–2005: EKF Eger
- 2005: Nitra
- 2006–2008: Metalac

Coaching
- 2009–2010: Mašinac
- 2012–2013: Sloboda
- 2013–2014: Sloga
- 2014–2016: Metalac
- 2016–2018: Vršac
- 2018–2019: Dynamic
- 2019–2021: Metalac
- 2021–2022, 2022–present: Vršac
Medals
Men's basketball
Head Coach for Serbia
U20 European Championship
Gold medal – first place	2015 Italy	U20 Team
U18 European Championship
Bronze medal – third place	2022 Turkey	Team

Vladimir Đokić (Serbian Cyrillic: Владимир Ђокић; born April 25, 1971) is a Serbian professional basketball coach and former player who is the head coach for Vršac of the Basketball League of Serbia.

== Playing career ==
A point guard, Đokić played 18 seasons in Yugoslavia, Slovakia, Hungary, Macedonia, and Serbia, between from 1990 and 2008. During his playing days, he played for Metalac, Spartak, Partizan, Crvena zvezda, Balkan Steel, Ergonom, EKF Eger, and Nitra. He retired as a player with Metalac in 2008.

== Coaching career ==
Đokić coached Serbian teams Mašinac, Sloboda, Sloga, Metalac and Vršac. On July 4, 2018, he was named as a head coach for Dynamic. On April 10, 2019, Dynamic parted ways with him. He is also known for coaching the winning team of the 2015 FIBA Europe Under-20 Championship.

On 27 September 2019, Đokić was named a head coach for Metalac. It is his second stint. He left Metalac in June 2021.

On 12 August 2021, Vršac hired Đokić as their new head coach. He parted ways with Vršac in March 2022.
