= Nenad Mišanović =

Serbian basketball player

Personal information
- Born: 11 June 1984 (age 42) Bileća, Bosnia and Herzegovina, SFR Yugoslavia
- Listed height: 2.17 m (7 ft 1 in)
- Listed weight: 106 kg (234 lb)

Career information
- NBA draft: 2006: undrafted
- Playing career: 2001–2021
- Position: Center
- Number: 13, 25

Career history
- 2001–2005: Hemofarm
- 2005–2008: Crvena zvezda
- 2008: Dynamo Moscow
- 2008–2009: Budućnost Podgorica
- 2009: Igokea
- 2009: Radnički Kragujevac
- 2010: PBG Basket Poznań
- 2010: OKK Beograd
- 2010–2011: Towzin Electric Kashan
- 2011–2012: OKK Beograd
- 2012–2013: US Monastir
- 2014: FMP
- 2015: Trefl Sopot
- 2015–2016: Kumanovo
- 2016–2017: Rabotnički
- 2017–2018: Near East University
- 2018–2021: Slodes

Nenad Mišanović (Serbian Cyrillic: Ненад Мишановић; born 11 June 1984) is a Serbian professional basketball executive and former player. He played the center position and is officially listed at 2.17 m (7 ft 1 1/2 in).

== Playing career ==
Mišanović retired as a player with Slodes in April 2021.

== Awards and accomplishments ==
- Adriatic League champion: (2005)
- Radivoj Korać Cup winner: (2006)
