= KK Sombor =

Basketball club in Sombor, Serbia

SBC Sombor
- Leagues: Basketball League of Serbia
- Founded: 2002; 24 years ago
- History: KK SO Koš; 2002–2017; KK Joker; 2017–2026; KK Sombor BC; 2026–present
- Arena: Mostonga Hall
- Capacity: 1,400
- Location: Sombor, Serbia
- Team colors: Yellow, purple

Košarkaški klub Sombor Basketball City (previously referred to as KK Joker) is a men's professional basketball club based in Sombor, Vojvodina, Serbia. They are currently competing in the top-level Basketball League of Serbia. The club took its name from Serbian three-time NBA MVP Nikola Jokić, nicknamed "[the] Joker".

== History ==
Founded in 2002 as KK SO Koš in Sombor, the club changed its name to KK Joker after the nickname of Serbian NBA All Star player Nikola Jokić who started his playing career with the club. In 2018, the club held the inaugural Joker Basketball Camp in Sombor.

In the 2019–20 Cup of Serbia quarterfinals, the club lost to Sloboda Užice.

In November 2021, the team qualified for the 2021–22 Cup of Serbia, following an 81–80 win over Spartak Subotica.

== Players ==
- Zoran Krstanović
- Nikola Jokić

== Head coaches ==
- (Serbia) Isidor Rudić (2019–2021)
- (Serbia) Nebojša Vagić (2021–present)

== Trophies and awards ==
=== Trophies ===
- First Regional League, North Division (3rd-tier)
  - Winners (1): 2021–22
