= Miloš Dimić =

Serbian basketball player

No. 17 – Vršac
- Position: Shooting guard
- League: Basketball League of Serbia

Personal information
- Born: 17 October 1989 (age 37) Leskovac, SR Serbia, SFR Yugoslavia
- Listed height: 1.95 m (6 ft 5 in)
- Listed weight: 83 kg (183 lb)

Career information
- NBA draft: 2011: undrafted
- Playing career: 2009–present

Career history
- 2009–2011: FMP
- 2011–2012: Radnički FMP
- 2012–2014: Radnički Kragujevac
- 2014–2015: Vršac
- 2015: Igokea
- 2016: Esprit Kosice
- 2016–2017: Vršac
- 2018: Borac Čačak
- 2019–present: Vršac

Career highlights
- Serbian League MVP (2012)

Miloš Dimić (Serbian Cyrillic: Милош Димић, born 17 October 1989) is a Serbian professional basketball player for Vršac of the Basketball League of Serbia.

== Professional career ==
Dimić was the best scorer and the MVP of the Basketball League of Serbia's Super League phase in the 2011–12 season, while playing for Radnički FMP. In December 2012, he signed with Radnički Kragujevac. In December 2014, he signed with KK Vršac.

On 26 March 2015, he signed with Bosnian defending champion Igokea until the end of the 2015–16 season. He debuted for the team in 67–56 loss to Cedevita Zagreb in Round 1 of the ABA League; he had miserable performance, 5 rebounds and 2 assists, while shooting 0 from 7 from the field in 20 minutes of action. On December 28, 2015, he parted ways with Igokea.

On 3 January 2018 Dimić signed with Borac Čačak for the rest of the 2017–18 season. He left the team in Summer 2018.

== National team ==
Dimić was a member of the team that represented Serbia at the 2011 Summer Universiade in Shenzhen, finishing as the gold medal winners.
