= KK Vršac =

Basketball club in Vršac, Serbia

Vršac
- Leagues: Basketball League of Serbia
- Founded: 1946; 80 years ago
- Arena: Millennium Centar
- Capacity: 4,400
- Location: Vršac, Serbia
- Team colors: Maroon, White
- President: Kristian Serman
- Head coach: Lazar Spasić
- Championships: 1 Adriatic League
- Website: kkvrsac.rs

Košarkaški klub Vršac Meridianbet (Serbian Cyrillic: Кошаркашки клуб Вршац Меридианбет), commonly referred to as KK Vršac Meridianbet, is a men's professional basketball club based in Vršac, Serbia. They are currently competing in the Basketball League of Serbia. Their home arena is the Millennium Centar, with a capacity of 4,400.

Over the years, the club competed under different names, mostly after sponsor companies, carrying for an extended period of time the name of pharmaceutical company Hemofarm.

== History ==
The club was founded in 1946 under the name KK Jedinstvo. From 1959 to 1967, the club competed under the name KK Mladost until the name got changed to KK Inex Brixol due to sponsorship reasons. In the 1968–69 season, they won first place in the Vojvodina lower-league. In 1977, the club changed its name again, this time to KK Agropanonija. Four years later, in 1981, they again became champions of Vojvodina, which won them the right to participate in the First B League, where they competed under the name KK Vršac. In 1989, Inex Hemofarm became principal sponsor and club changed its name to KK Inex.

=== The Hemofarm years: 1992–2012 ===
Under the sponsorship of Hemofarm since 1992, the club went from average participants of the lower leagues in Vojvodina to one of the leading clubs in the country. In their first season under the name of KK Hemofarm, they competed in the First League of Vojvodina and regularly improved. In the 1995–96 season, the team was led by Marin Sedlaček, a young and ambitious coach, who led the team to a higher league.

Hemofarm's top league status was achieved in the 1997–98 season, under the guidance of coach Slobodan Lukić. The first season among the elite kept their survival, but during the 1999–2000 season, they finished fourth in the standings, providing their first trip to Europe in the FIBA Korać Cup. As newcomers, they reached the finals under coach Željko Lukajić during the 2000–01 season, where they fell short to Spain's Unicaja Málaga, which was headed by Božidar Maljković. That same year, the team's quality was confirmed with placement at the National Cup final tournament, which was organized in Vršac for the first time, at the opening of the Millennium Centar.

During the 2001–02 season, they played the playoff semifinal of the national championship, where they fell short to Budućnost after five games. In the next season, they played in the final of the National Cup, where they were defeated by FMP, and in the 2003–04 season, they once again fell short, playing in the National League finals against Partizan.

The 2004–05 season was the most successful in the club's history. As rookies, they won the regional Adriatic League. Hemofarm finished the regular season in first place in the standings, and at the Final Eight in Belgrade, they eliminated Bosna, FMP and Partizan in the final. That same season, Vršac was again hosting the final tournament of the National Cup, but the club lost to Budućnost in the first game. In the ULEB Cup, they reached the semifinals, where they fell short by the Greek team Makedonikos.

In the 2005–06 season, they once again played in the ULEB Cup semifinals and took part in the Adriatic League Final Eight. In the 2006–07 season, they played in the semifinals of the National Cup and the Adriatic League semifinals.

In the 2008–09 season, the team was taken over by Stevan Karadžić who led them to the semifinals in all competitions; Radivoj Korać Cup, Basketball League of Serbia, ABA League and Eurocup. Reaching the Eurocup Final Eight in Turin was a major success for Serbian basketball, especially as the club had the youngest team in the whole competition. In the first match of the tournament in Italy, they bested the favored Dynamo Moscow, but lost to Lietuvos rytas, who went on to win the competition.

In the middle of the 2011–12 season, Hemofarm stopped financing the club after 20 years because of financial instabilities within the company. All of the players were informed that they were free to leave the club.

=== KK Vršac (2012–present) ===
In the summer of 2012, the club changed its name back to KK Vršac.

A few days after the end of the 2023–24 season, on April 16, the club announced that it had signed a title sponsorship agreement with Meridianbet.

== Sponsorship naming ==
The club has had several denominations through the years due to its sponsorship:

- Hemofarm STADA (2007–2012)
- Vršac Swisslion (2014–2016)
- Vršac Meridianbet (2024–present)

== Logos ==
1992–2012

2012–present

== Players ==
=== Current roster ===
Note: Flags indicate national team eligibility at FIBA-sanctioned events. Players may hold other non-FIBA nationalities not displayed.

KK Vršac roster
Players
Coaches

Pos.	No.	Nat.	Name	Ht.	Age
SG	0	(Serbia)	Radovanović, Nikola	1.95 m (6 ft 5 in)	25 – 29 May 2001
PG	2	(Serbia)	Mićović, Ognjen	1.87 m (6 ft 2 in)	26 – 10 March 2000
PG	4	(Serbia)	Dukić, Marko	1.90 m (6 ft 3 in)	24 – 9 December 2001
F	6	(Serbia)	Jovanović, Luka	2.03 m (6 ft 8 in)	26 – 4 June 2000
PG	8	(Serbia)	Jovanović, Slobodan	1.93 m (6 ft 4 in)	29 – 19 February 1997
F	9	(Serbia)	Agoč, Stegan	2.01 m (6 ft 7 in)	24 – 27 May 2002
SG	13	(Slovenia)	Jurček, Žiga	1.96 m (6 ft 5 in)	28 – 22 April 1998
F	15	(Serbia)	Vasiljević, Toma	2.05 m (6 ft 9 in)	25 – 7 October 2000
SF	16	(Serbia)	Tomić, David	1.98 m (6 ft 6 in)	22 – 14 July 2004
SG	17	(Serbia)	Dimić, Miloš	1.94 m (6 ft 4 in)	36 – 17 October 1989
PG	22	(Serbia)	Milić, Andrija	1.82 m (6 ft 0 in)	23 – 2 September 2002
F/C	31	(Serbia)	Jeković, Bratislav	2.02 m (6 ft 8 in)	29 – 31 August 1996
SG	67	(Serbia)	Majstorović, Mateja	1.88 m (6 ft 2 in)	23 – 4 August 2003
PG	77	(Serbia)	Nikolić, Miloš	1.86 m (6 ft 1 in)	29 – 17 October 1996
C	88	(Serbia)	Juzbašić, Dušan	2.07 m (6 ft 9 in)	28 – 8 June 1998
PG		(Serbia)	Vasić, Lazar (L)	1.91 m (6 ft 3 in)	25 – 3 January 2001
SG		(Serbia)	Radović, Matija	2.01 m (6 ft 7 in)	28 – 25 April 1998

Head coach

- (Serbia) Vladimir Đokić

Assistant coach(es)

- (Serbia) Marko Lalić

Legend

- (C) Team captain
- (TW) Two-way affiliate player
- Injured

- Roster
Updated: August 24, 2022

=== Players on the NBA draft ===
Position	Player	Year	Round	Pick	Drafted by
C	(Federal Republic of Yugoslavia) Darko Miličić	2003	1st round	2nd	Detroit Pistons

== Coaches ==
Hemofarm (1992–2012)

- (Serbia and Montenegro) Miroslav Popov (1993–1994)
- (Serbia and Montenegro) Miroslav Kanjevac (1994–1995)
- (Serbia and Montenegro) Marin Sedlaček (1995–1996)
- (Serbia and Montenegro) Ivan Jeremić (1996–1997)
- (Serbia and Montenegro) Slobodan Lukić (1997–1998)
- (Serbia and Montenegro) Željko Lukajić (1998–2005)
- (Serbia and Montenegro) Luka Pavićević (2005)
- (Serbia) Miroslav Nikolić (2005–2008)
- (Serbia) Vlada Vukoičić (2008)
- (Serbia) Stevan Karadžić (2008–2010)
- (Serbia) Željko Lukajić (2010–2012)
- (Serbia) Dušan Gvozdić (2012, interim)
- (Montenegro) Nebojša Bogavac (2012)

Vršac (2012–present)

- (Serbia) Oliver Popović (2012–2014)
- (Serbia) Dušan Gvozdić (2014–2015)
- (Serbia) Miloš Pejić (2015–2016)
- (Serbia) Milan Gurović (2016)
- (Serbia) Vladimir Đokić (2016–2018)
- (Serbia) Goran Topić (2018)
- (Serbia) Mihajlo Mitić (2018)
- (Serbia) Branko Maksimović (2018)
- (Greece) Darko Kostić (2019–2020)
- (Serbia) Zoran Todorović (2020)
- (Serbia) Vladimir Lučić (2020–2021)
- (Serbia) Vladimir Đokić (2021–2022)
- (Serbia) Siniša Matić (2022)
- (Serbia) Vladimir Đokić (2022–present)

== Season-by-season ==
Season	Tier	Division	Pos.	Postseason	W–L	National Cup	Adriatic competitions			European competitions		
Hemofarm
1996–97	2	YUBA B League	5	—	20–14	N/A				—		
1997–98	2	YUBA B League	C	—	N/A	N/A				—		
1998–99	1	YUBA League	10	Not held	7–15	N/A				—		
1999–00	1	YUBA League	4	Semifinalist	15–12	N/A				—		
2000–01	1	YUBA League	6	Semifinalist	12–15	Quarterfinalist				3 Korać Cup	2nd	11–5
2001–02	1	YUBA League	4	Semifinalist	17–13	N/A	—			3 Korać Cup	T16	5–5
2002–03	1	YUBA League	5	Quarterfinalist	15–10	Runners up	—			4 Champions Cup	4th	14–5
2003–04	1	BLSM First League	2	Runners up	31–11	Quarterfinalist	—			3 Europe League	QF	11–6
2004–05	1	BLSM First League	2	Runners up	14–6	Quarterfinalist	ABA League	C	25–8	2 ULEB Cup	SF	9–7
2005–06	1	BLSM First League	B3	—	6–4	Runners up	ABA League	SF	17–11	2 ULEB Cup	SF	12–4
2006–07	1	BLS Super League	1	Semifinalist	12–4	Semifinalist	ABA League	SF	18–10	2 ULEB Cup	T16	6–6
2007–08	1	BLS Super League	3	Runners up	12–9	Runners up	ABA League	2nd	19–12	2 ULEB Cup	T16	7–7
2008–09	1	BLS Super League	B2	Semifinalist	6–4	Semifinalist	ABA League	SF	19–8	2 Eurocup	SF	5–3
2009–10	1	BLS Super League	2	Runners up	14–5	Semifinalist	ABA League	SF	17–10	2 Eurocup	RS	1–5
2010–11	1	BLS Super League	2	Runners up	12–8	Quarterfinalist	ABA League	6	14–12	2 Eurocup	T16	5–7
2011–12	1	BLS Super League	8	—	4–10	Semifinalist	ABA League	12	7–19	—		
Vršac
2012–13	1	BLS First League	6	—	14–12	Quarterfinalist	—			—		
2013–14	1	BLS First League	7	—	13–13	—	—			—		
2014–15	1	BLS First League	5	—	13–9	Semifinalist	—			—		
2015–16	1	BLS First League	10	—	11–15	—	—			—		
2016–17	1	BLS First League	1	SL 7th	25–15	Quarterfinalist	—			—		
2017–18	1	BLS First League	3	Quarterfinalist	20–18	—	ABA 2nd League	SF	18–8	—		
2018–19	1	BLS First League	9	—	11–15	—	ABA 2nd League	12	1–21	—		
2019–20	1	BLS First League	12	Abd	9–17	—	—			—		
2020–21	1	BLS First League	6	—	15–15	—	—			—		
2021–22	1	BLS First League	11	—	14–16	—	—			—		
2022–23	1	BLS First League	8	—	14–16	—	—			—		
2023–24	1	BLS First League	4	—	22–8	—	—			—		
2024–25	1	BLS First League	1	—	25–5	Quarterfinalist	—			—		

== Trophies and awards ==
=== Trophies ===
- Serbia and Montenegro League
  - Runners-up (2) – 2004, 2005
- Basketball League of Serbia
  - Runners-up (3) – 2008, 2010, 2011
- Radivoj Korać Cup
  - Runners-up (3) – 2003, 2006, 2008
- ABA League
  - Winners (1) – 2005
  - Runners-up (1) – 2008
- FIBA Korać Cup
  - Runners-up (1) – 2001

== Notable players ==
- (Serbia) Milan Mačvan
- (Serbia) Boban Marjanović
- (Serbia) Stefan Marković
- (Serbia) Darko Miličić
- (Serbia) Marko Simonović
- (Serbia) Danilo Anđušić
- (Serbia) Mladen Jeremić
- (Serbia) Zlatko Bolić
- (Serbia) Petar Božić
- (Serbia) Đorđe Gagić
- (Serbia) Nemanja Dangubić
- (Serbia) Miloš Dimić
- (Serbia) Raško Katić
- (Serbia) Predrag Šuput
- (Serbia) Vladimir Tica
- (Serbia) Milenko Topić
- (Serbia) Nemanja Krstić
- (Serbia) Bojan Krstović
- (Serbia) Nikola Milutinov
- (Serbia) Nenad Mišanović
- (Serbia) Luka Mitrović
- (Serbia) Jovan Novak
- (Serbia) Miljan Pavković
- (Serbia) Slavko Stefanović
- (Serbia) Vanja Plisnić
- (Serbia) Petar Popović
- (Serbia) Dragoljub Vidačić
- (Serbia) Vladan Vukosavljević
- (Bosnia and Herzegovina) Jasmin Hukić
- (Bosnia and Herzegovina) Aleksej Nešović
- (Bosnia and Herzegovina) Marko Šutalo
- (Bosnia and Herzegovina) Saša Vasiljević
- (Montenegro) Bojan Bakić
- (Montenegro) Nebojša Bogavac
- (Montenegro) Miloš Borisov
- (Montenegro) Ivan Maraš
- (Montenegro) Nemanja Radović
- (Montenegro) Boris Savović
- (Slovenia) Goran Jagodnik
- (Slovenia) Nebojša Joksimović
- (Guyana) Rawle Marshall
- (Hungary) Márton Báder
- (Jamaica) Jerome Jordan
- (South Korea) Moon Tae-Jong
- (United States) Mustafa Abdul-Hamid
- (United States) Robert Conley
- (United States) Vonteego Cummings
- (United States) Gerrod Henderson
- (United States) Kyle Hill
- (United States) Trey Johnson
- (United States) Rashad Wright

== International record ==
Season	Achievement	Notes
EuroCup
2008–09	Semifinals	Eliminated by Lietuvos rytas, 68–73
2005–06	Semifinals	Eliminated by Aris TT Bank, 151–153 (1–1)
2004–05	Semifinals	Eliminated by Makedonikos, 172–180 (1–1)
2007–08	Top 16	Eliminated by Akasvayu Girona, 133–156 (0–2)
2006–07	Top 16	Eliminated by UNICS, 137–185 (0–2)
2010–11	Top 16	4th in Group K with Asefa Estudiantes, Pepsi Caserta, Galatasaray Café Crown, and ČEZ Nymburk (2–4)
2009–10	Regular season	4th in Group B with Power Electronics Valencia, Le Mans, and Triumph Lyubertsy (1–5)
FIBA EuroChallenge
2003–04	Quarter-finals	Eliminated by UNICS, 1–2
FIBA Korać Cup
2000–01	Runners-up	Eliminated by Unicaja, 116–148 (0–2)
2001–02	Round of 16	Eliminated by Maroussi Telestet, 140–156 (0–2)
FIBA EuroCup Challenge
2002–03	3rd place game	Eliminated by Ventspils, 90–91

== See also ==
- List of basketball clubs in Serbia by major honours won
