= KK Slodes =

Basketball club in Belgrade, Serbia

Slodes
- Leagues: Second League of Serbia
- Founded: 2009; 16 years ago
- History: KK Slodes; 2009–present
- Arena: Slodes Hall
- Capacity: 2,000
- Location: Belgrade, Serbia
- Team colors: Yellow and black
- President: Ivica Tomović
- Head coach: Dušan Petrović

Košarkaški klub Slodes (Serbian Cyrillic: Кошаркашки клуб Слодес, transl. Slodes Basketball Club) is a men's basketball club based in Belgrade, Serbia. They currently competing in the Second Basketball League of Serbia.

== History ==
The club was founded in 2009. They used to play in the 3rd-tier First Regional League of Serbia, Center Division. They finished at the top spot in the 2019–20 season prior to the cancellation of the season. After the abandoned season, the club got promoted to the Second Basketball League of Serbia for the 2020–21 season.

== Sponsorship naming ==
The club has had several denominations through the years due to its sponsorship:

- Slodes SoccerBet: 2021–2022

== Home arena ==
Slodes plays its home games at the Slodes Hall. The hall is located in the Stari košutnjak neighborhood, Rakovica in Belgrade and was built in 1995. It has a seating capacity of 2,000 seats.

== Head coaches ==
- (Serbia) Tomislav Tomović
- (Serbia) Marko Boras (2018 – December 2021)
- (Serbia) Nenad Karanović, interim (December 2021)
- (Serbia) Igor Polenek (December 2021 – March 2022)
- (Serbia) Nenad Karanović (April 2022)
- (Serbia) Dušan Petrović (May 2022 – present)

== Season-by-season ==
| Season | Tier | Division | Pos. | W–L | National Cup |
|---|---|---|---|---|---|
| 2011–12 | 3 | First Regional League | 5 | 17–7 | — |
| 2012–13 | 3 | First Regional League | 5 | 17–9 | — |
| 2013–14 | 3 | First Regional League | 3 | 21–5 | — |
| 2014–15 | 3 | First Regional League | 6 | 16–10 | — |
| 2015–16 | 3 | First Regional League | 3 | 17–9 | — |
| 2016–17 | 3 | First Regional League | 10 | 10–16 | — |
| 2017–18 | 3 | First Regional League | 5 | 13–9 | — |
| 2018–19 | 3 | First Regional League | 2 | 18–2 | — |
| 2019-20 | 3 | First Regional League | 1 | 16–2 | — |
| 2020–21 | 2 | BLS Second League | 2 | 16–6 | — |
| 2021–22 | 1 | BLS First League | 16 | 2–28 | — |

== Notable players ==
- (Serbia) Nenad Mišanović
- (Greece) Miloš Šakota
- (Serbia) Nemanja Nenadić
- (Serbia) Miloš Vraneš

== Trophies and awards ==
- Serbian Second League (2nd-tier)
  - Runners-up (1): 2020–21
- First Regional League, Central Division (3rd-tier)
  - Winners (1): 2019–20
  - Runners-up (1): 2018–19
