= 2016–17 KK Crvena zvezda season =

Serbian basketball club season

Crvena zvezda mts
2016–17 season
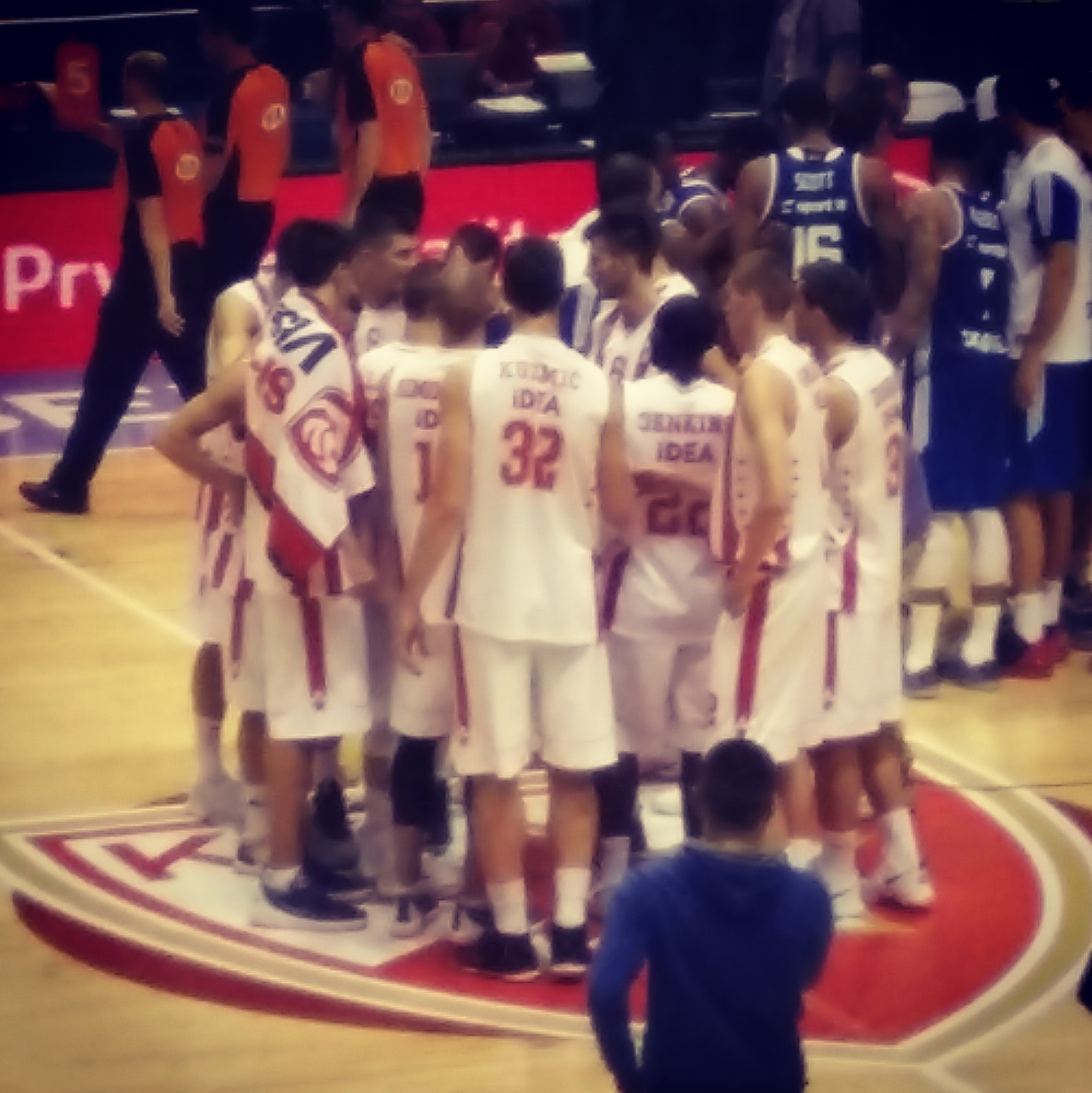
- President: (Serbia) Nebojša Čović
- Head coach: (Montenegro) Dejan Radonjić
- Arena: Aleksandar Nikolić Hall; Kombank Arena
- Serbian League: 1st
- Playoffs: Champions
- Adriatic League: 1st
- Playoffs: Champions
- EuroLeague: 9th
- Radivoj Korać Cup: Winner
- PIR leader: (Serbia) Kuzmić 13.3
- Scoring leader: (Serbia) Simonović 10.6
- Rebounding leader: (Serbia) Kuzmić 5.6
- Assists leader: (Serbia) Jović 5.7
- Highest home attendance: 18,487 (Note: Euroleague season record); 78–67 CSKA Moscow (29 December 2016)
- Lowest home attendance: 500; 80–55 Vršac (29 May 2017)
- Biggest win: 111–56 Borac (31 May 2017)
- Biggest defeat: Real Madrid 98–68 (10 March 2017)
Home	Away
- All statistics correct as of 30 July 2017.

The 2016–17 season is the Crvena zvezda 72nd season in the existence of the club. The team played in the Basketball League of Serbia, in the Adriatic League and in the Euroleague.

== Overview ==
Season 2016–17 saw Crvena zvezda parting ways with its two star players, Maik Zirbes and Quincy Miller, as well as Tarence Kinsey, Vladimir Štimac and Vasilije Micić. During the pre-season, the club signed Ognjen Kuzmić, Milko Bjelica and Charles Jenkins, brought talented Petar Rakićević and promoted Ognjen Dobrić from its development team. When the season already began, the club brought on Nate Wolters who was waived by Detroit Pistons. Squad was finally completed mid-season, with the addition of Deon Thompson to the roster. Building on previous years tactics, Zvezda's trademark became its strong, aggressive defense, pressure on the ball, intercepting passes, steals and resulting fast breaks. In January 2017. coach Dejan Radonjić achieved his 200th victory leading Zvezda. He also brought another Radivoj Korać Cup to the team. Zvezda has ended the regular ABA league season with 25 wins on their record, while losing only once, which was the best regular season record made by any team in the history of the regional competition so far. Team narrowly stayed out of Top 8, ending up on 9th place, having the same number of victories as 8th placed Darussafaka, but having worse head-to-head record. However, it decisively defended ABA league trophy, defeating Budućnost VOLI (2-1) and Cedevita (3-0) on its way. In the domestic championship, Zvezda ended league part with the score of 13-1, defeated Mega Leks (2-0) and FMP (3-0) in the playoffs, and lifted another trophy.

== Players ==
=== Squad information ===
Note: Flags indicate national team eligibility at FIBA sanctioned events. Players may hold other non-FIBA nationality not displayed.

Crvena zvezda roster
Players
Coaches

Pos.	No.	Nat.	Name	Ht.	Wt.	Age
F/C	51	(Montenegro)	Bjelica, Milko	2.07 m (6 ft 9 in)	102 kg (225 lb)	42 – 4 June 1984
G/F	6	(Serbia)	Dangubić, Nemanja	2.04 m (6 ft 8 in)	88 kg (194 lb)	33 – 13 April 1993
G/F	13	(Serbia)	Dobrić, Ognjen	2.00 m (6 ft 7 in)	90 kg (198 lb)	31 – 27 October 1994
G/F	23	(Serbia)	Gudurić, Marko	1.96 m (6 ft 5 in)	91 kg (201 lb)	31 – 8 March 1995
G	22	(United States)	Jenkins, Charles	1.91 m (6 ft 3 in)	100 kg (220 lb)	37 – 28 February 1989
PG	24	(Serbia)	Jović, Stefan	1.98 m (6 ft 6 in)	94 kg (207 lb)	35 – 3 November 1990
C	32	(Serbia)	Kuzmić, Ognjen	2.16 m (7 ft 1 in)	114 kg (251 lb)	36 – 16 May 1990
G/F	10	(Serbia)	Lazić, Branko	1.95 m (6 ft 5 in)	87 kg (192 lb)	37 – 12 January 1989
PF	9	(Serbia)	Mitrović, Luka (C)	2.05 m (6 ft 9 in)	102 kg (225 lb)	33 – 21 March 1993
G/F	20	(Serbia)	Rakićević, Petar	2.04 m (6 ft 8 in)	81 kg (179 lb)	31 – 4 June 1995
F	12	(Serbia)	Simanić, Boriša	2.09 m (6 ft 10 in)	92 kg (203 lb)	28 – 20 March 1998
F	19	(Serbia)	Simonović, Marko	2.03 m (6 ft 8 in)	95 kg (209 lb)	40 – 30 May 1986
F/C	2	(United States)	Thompson, Deon	2.04 m (6 ft 8 in)	109 kg (240 lb)	38 – 16 September 1988
PG	0	(United States)	Wolters, Nate	1.93 m (6 ft 4 in)	86 kg (190 lb)	35 – 15 May 1991

Head coach

- (Montenegro) Dejan Radonjić

Assistant coach(es)

- (Montenegro) Borko Radović
- (Serbia) Saša Kosović

Team manager

- (Serbia) Nebojša Ilić

Legend

- (C) Team captain
- Injured

- Roster
Updated: 2 January 2017

=== Depth chart ===
Pos.	Starting 5	Bench 1	Bench 2	Reserves
C	Ognjen Kuzmić	Milko Bjelica	Deon Thompson
PF	Luka Mitrović	Marko Simonović		Boriša Simanić
SF	Nemanja Dangubić	Branko Lazić
SG	Charles Jenkins	Marko Gudurić	Ognjen Dobrić	Petar Rakićević
PG	Stefan Jović	Nate Wolters

=== Players with multiple nationalities ===
- (Montenegro) (Serbia) Milko Bjelica
- (United States) (Serbia) Charles Jenkins
- (Serbia) (Bosnia and Herzegovina) Ognjen Kuzmić

=== Out on loan ===
- (Serbia) Dejan Davidovac (at FMP since 2015)
- (Serbia) Stefan Lazarević (at FMP since 2014)
- (Serbia) Aleksa Radanov (at FMP since 2015)
- (Serbia) Dragan Apić (at FMP since 2015)
- (Serbia) Aleksandar Aranitović (at FMP since 2016)
- (Serbia) Stefan Kenić (at Smederevo 1953 since 2016)
- (Serbia) Marko Tejić (at Mega Bemax since 2016)
- (Serbia) Marko Radovanović (at Borac Čačak since 2016)

=== Players in ===
Position	#	Player	Moving from	Ref.
SF	13	(Serbia) Ognjen Dobrić	(Serbia) FMP (Loan return)	
PF	15	(Serbia) Marko Tejić	(Serbia) FMP (Loan return)	
G	22	(United States) Charles Jenkins	(Italy) EA7 Emporio Armani Milan	
C	32	(Serbia) Ognjen Kuzmić	(Greece) Panathinaikos	
F/C	51	(Montenegro) Milko Bjelica	(Turkey) Darüşşafaka Doğuş	
G/F	20	(Serbia) Petar Rakićević	(Serbia) Metalac	
PG	0	(United States) Nate Wolters	(Turkey) Beşiktaş Sompo Japan	
PF	2	(United States) Deon Thompson	(Turkey) Galatasaray Odeabank	

=== Players out ===
Position	#	Player	Moving to	Ref.
PF	15	(Serbia) Marko Tejić	(Serbia) Mega Leks (Loan)	
SF	–	(Serbia) Danilo Ostojić^{1}	(Serbia) Metalac Valjevo	
F	30	(United States) Quincy Miller	(Israel) Maccabi Tel Aviv	
C	33	(Germany) Maik Zirbes	(Israel) Maccabi Tel Aviv	
PG	13	(Serbia) Vasilije Micić	(Turkey) Tofaş	
SG	1	(United States) Tarence Kinsey	(Israel) Hapoel Jerusalem	
C	51	(Serbia) Vladimir Štimac	(Turkey) Beşiktaş Sompo Japan	
PG	4	(Serbia) Nikola Rebić	(Serbia) Mega Leks	

Notes:

- ^{1} On loan during entire 2015–16 season.

== Club ==
=== Technical Staff ===
- General Manager (Serbia) Davor Ristović
- Team Manager (Serbia) Nebojša Ilić
- Head coach (Montenegro) Dejan Radonjić
- Assistant coach (Montenegro) Borko Radović
- Assistant coach (Serbia) Nikola Birač
- Assistant coach (Serbia) Saša Kosović
- Conditioning coach (Montenegro) Dragan Gačević
- Physiotherapist (Serbia) Milorad Ćirić

=== Kit ===
- Supplier: Champion
- Main sponsor: mts
- Back sponsor: Idea
- Short sponsor:

Home	Away

== Competitions ==
=== Overall ===
Competition	Started round	Final position / round	First match	Last match
Adriatic League	Matchday 1	Champions	29 September 2016	13 April 2017
EuroLeague	Matchday 1	9th	13 October 2016	7 April 2017
Serbian Super League	Matchday 1	Champions	21 April 2017	16 June 2017
Radivoj Korać Cup	Quarterfinals	Winner	16 February 2017	19 February 2017

Source: Competitions

=== Overview ===
Competition	Record							
Competition	Pld	W	D	L	PF	PA	PD	Win %
Adriatic League	26	25	0	1	2,226	1,762	+464	96.15
Adriatic League Playoffs	6	5	0	1	463	389	+74	83.33
Serbian League	14	13	0	1	1,212	940	+272	92.86
Serbian League Playoffs	5	5	0	0	441	344	+97	100.00
Radivoj Korać Cup	3	3	0	0	249	171	+78	100.00
EuroLeague	30	16	0	14	2,203	2,196	+7	53.33
Total	84	67	0	17	6,794	5,802	+992	79.76

Last updated: 30 July 2017
Source: Competitions

=== Adriatic League ===
==== Regular season ====
Pos	Team	Pld	W	L	PF	PA	PD	Pts	Qualification or relegation
1	(Serbia) Crvena zvezda mts	26	25	1	2226	1762	+464	51	Advance to the playoffs
2	(Croatia) Cedevita	26	20	6	2323	2108	+215	46	Advance to the playoffs
3	(Serbia) Partizan NIS	26	19	7	2081	1948	+133	45	Advance to the playoffs
4	(Montenegro) Budućnost VOLI	26	18	8	2136	1968	+168	44	Advance to the playoffs
5	(Bosnia and Herzegovina) Igokea	26	13	13	1950	2017	−67	39	

Source: ABA League

==== Results by round ====
Round	1	2	3	4	5	6	7	8	9	10	11	12	13	14	15	16	17	18	19	20	21	22	23	24	25	26
Ground	H	H	A	H	A	H	A	H	A	H	A	H	A	A	A	H	A	H	A	H	A	H	A	H	A	H
Result	W	W	W	W	W	W	W	W	W	W	W	W	W	W	W	W	W	W	W	W	L	W	W	W	W	W
Position	1	1	1	1	1	1	1	1	1	1	1	1	1	1	1	1	1	1	1	1	1	1	1	1	1	1

Source: Competitive matches
Ground: A = Away; H = Home; R = Rest. Result: L = Loss; W = Win; R = Rest; P = Postponed.

Win Loss

==== Matches ====
30 September 2016 1	Crvena zvezda mts (Serbia)	91–69	(North Macedonia) MZT Skopje Aerodrom	Belgrade
19:00 (CET)	Scoring by quarter: 27–20, 22–10, 20–16, 22–23
		Report		Arena: Aleksandar Nikolić Hall; Attendance: 4,300; Referees: Sinisa Herceg, Tomislav Hordov, Josip Radojkovic

3 October 2016 2	Crvena zvezda mts (Serbia)	88–64	(Croatia) Cedevita	Belgrade
21:00 (CEST)	Scoring by quarter: 15–7, 23–25, 28–12, 22–20
		Report		Arena: Aleksandar Nikolić Hall; Attendance: 5,734; Referees: Sasa Pukl, Matej Boltauzer, Milos Koljensic

6 October 2016 3	Zadar (Croatia)	66–103	(Serbia) Crvena zvezda mts	Zadar
19:00 (CEST)	Scoring by quarter: 23–23, 12–26, 11–24, 20–30
		Report		Arena: Krešimir Ćosić Hall; Attendance: 5,000; Referees: Saso Petek, Mario Majkic, Igor Dragojevic

9 October 2016 4	Crvena zvezda mts (Serbia)	96–76	(Serbia) Mega Leks	Belgrade
17:00 (CEST)	Scoring by quarter: 32–14, 24–17, 21–24, 19–21
		Report		Arena: Aleksandar Nikolić Hall; Attendance: 4,347; Referees: Milija Vojinovic, Milivoje Jovcic, Tomislav Hordov

17 October 2016 5	Krka (Slovenia)	56–67	(Serbia) Crvena zvezda mts	Novo Mesto
18:00 (CEST)	Scoring by quarter: 17–19, 15–23, 11–11, 13–14
		Report		Arena: Leon Štukelj Hall; Attendance: 1,000; Referees: Sreten Radovic, Matej Boltauzer, Milos Koljensic

23 October 2016 6	Crvena zvezda mts (Serbia)	68–66	(Bosnia and Herzegovina) Igokea	Belgrade
21:00 (CEST)	Scoring by quarter: 21–12, 19–17, 7–20, 21–17
		Report		Arena: Aleksandar Nikolić Hall; Attendance: 2,500; Referees: Sasa Pukl, Saso Petek, Uros Obrknezevic

30 October 2016 7	Mornar (Montenegro)	59–71	(Serbia) Crvena zvezda mts	Bar
18:00 (CET)	Scoring by quarter: 17–10, 15–21, 11–22, 16–18
		Report		Arena: Topolica Sport Hall; Attendance: 3,800; Referees: Sreten Radovic, Mario Majkic, Matej Spendl

7 November 2016 8	Crvena zvezda mts (Serbia)	83–72	(Serbia) Partizan NIS	Belgrade
21:00 (CET)	Scoring by quarter: 20–23, 28–16, 22–14, 13–19
		Report		Arena: Aleksandar Nikolić Hall; Attendance: 5,678; Referees: Ilija Belosevic, Milija Vojinovic, Marko Juras

13 November 2016 9	Cibona (Croatia)	70–91	(Serbia) Crvena zvezda mts	Zagreb
21:00 (CET)
		Report		Arena: Dražen Petrović Basketball Hall; Attendance: 3,500

21 November 2016 10	Crvena zvezda mts (Serbia)	91–70	(North Macedonia) Karpoš Sokoli	Belgrade
18:00 (CET)
		Report		Arena: Aleksandar Nikolić Hall; Attendance: 1,674

28 November 2016 11	Union Olimpija (Slovenia)	67–85	(Serbia) Crvena zvezda mts	Ljubljana
17:00 (CET)
		Report		Arena: Arena Stožice; Attendance: 4,000

5 December 2016 12	Crvena zvezda mts (Serbia)	93–62	(Serbia) FMP	Belgrade
17:00 (CET)
		Report		Arena: Aleksandar Nikolić Hall; Attendance: 1,562

11 December 2016 13	Budućnost VOLI (Montenegro)	54–77	(Serbia) Crvena zvezda mts	Podgorica
19:00 (CET)
		Report		Arena: Morača Sports Center; Attendance: 5,000

17 December 2016 14	MZT Skopje Aerodrom (North Macedonia)	73–93	(Serbia) Crvena zvezda mts	Skopje
17:00 (CET)
		Report		Arena: Jane Sandanski Arena; Attendance: 3,350

25 December 2016 15	Cedevita (Croatia)	91–95	(Serbia) Crvena zvezda mts	Zagreb
19:00 (CET)
		Report		Arena: Dom Sportova; Attendance: 2,800

2 January 2017 16	Crvena zvezda mts (Serbia)	113–65	(Croatia) Zadar	Belgrade
19:00 (CET)
		Report		Arena: Aleksandar Nikolić Hall; Attendance: 8,450

9 January 2017 17	Mega Leks (Serbia)	69–81	(Serbia) Crvena zvezda mts	Sremska Mitrovica
18:00 (CET)
		Report		Arena: Sports Hall Pinki; Attendance: 2,300

15 January 2017 18	Crvena zvezda mts (Serbia)	79–62	(Slovenia) Krka	Belgrade
17:00 (CET)
		Report		Arena: Aleksandar Nikolić Hall; Attendance: 3,947

21 January 2017 19	Igokea (Bosnia and Herzegovina)	68–77	(Serbia) Crvena zvezda mts	Laktaši
17:00 (CET)
		Report		Arena: Laktaši Sports Hall; Attendance: 3,000

30 January 2017 20	Crvena zvezda mts (Serbia)	82–71	(Montenegro) Mornar	Belgrade
18:00 (CET)
		Report		Arena: Aleksandar Nikolić Hall; Attendance: 3,687

5 February 2017 21	Partizan NIS (Serbia)	86–81	(Serbia) Crvena zvezda mts	Belgrade
18:00 (CET)
		Report		Arena: Aleksandar Nikolić Hall; Attendance: 6,500

12 February 2017 22	Crvena zvezda mts (Serbia)	69–56	(Croatia) Cibona	Belgrade
17:00 (CET)
		Report		Arena: Aleksandar Nikolić Hall; Attendance: 3,987

14 February 2017 23	Karpoš Sokoli (North Macedonia)	61–98	(Serbia) Crvena zvezda mts	Skopje
18:00 (CET)
		Report		Arena: Boris Trajkovski Sports Center; Attendance: 2,100

27 February 2017 24	Crvena zvezda mts (Serbia)	88–67	(Slovenia) Union Olimpija	Belgrade
18:00 (CET)
		Report		Arena: Aleksandar Nikolić Hall; Attendance: 3,135

5 March 2017 25	FMP (Serbia)	76–84	(Serbia) Crvena zvezda mts	Belgrade
21:00 (CET)
		Report		Arena: Železnik Hall; Attendance: 900

13 March 2017 26	Crvena zvezda mts (Serbia)	82–66	(Montenegro) Budućnost VOLI	Belgrade
21:00 (CET)
		Report		Arena: Aleksandar Nikolić Hall; Attendance: 3,679

==== Playoffs ====
Semifinals

19 March 2017 SF1	Crvena zvezda mts (Serbia)	82–67	(Montenegro) Budućnost VOLI	Belgrade
19:00 (CET)	Scoring by quarter: 21–17, 22–14, 19–18, 20–18
	Pts: Simonović, Gudurić 18; Rebs: Dangubić 5 Asts: Jenkins 6 PIR: Simonović, Kuzmić 21	Report	Pts: Klassen 12; Rebs: Savović 7 Asts: Gordić 7 PIR: Vranješ 14	Arena: Hall Aleksandar Nikolić; Attendance: 5,978; Referees: (Croatia) Sreten Radović (Croatia) Siniša Herceg (Serbia) Marko Juras

28 March 2017 SF2	Budućnost VOLI (Montenegro)	63–57	(Serbia) Crvena zvezda mts	Podgorica
20:00 (CEST)	Scoring by quarter: 13–13, 20–10, 9–14, 21–20
	Pts: Savović 15; Rebs: Savović 11; Asts: three players 2 PIR: Savović 13	Report	Pts: Gudurić 17; Rebs: Dangubić, Lazić 5 Asts: Gudurić 2 PIR: Gudurić 17	Arena: Morača Sports Center; Attendance: 4,500; Referees: (Slovenia) Saša Pukl (Croatia) Tomislav Hordov (Serbia) Uroš Obrknežević

4 April 2017 SF3	Crvena zvezda mts (Serbia)	82–59	(Montenegro) Budućnost VOLI	Belgrade
19:00 (CEST)	Scoring by quarter: 21–15, 14–14, 32–22, 15–8
	Pts: Jenkins 17; Rebs: Mitrović 12; Asts: Jenkins 6 PIR: Jenkins 24	Report	Pts: Reynolds, Savović 16; Rebs: Ilić 6 Asts: Gordić 4 PIR: Savović 15	Arena: Železnik Hall; Attendance: 3,209; Referees: (Slovenia) Matej Boltauzer (Slovenia) Sašo Petek (Croatia) Josip Radojković

Finals

10 April 2017 F1	Crvena zvezda mts (Serbia)	81–66	(Croatia) Cedevita	Belgrade
19:00 (CEST)	Scoring by quarter: 16–27, 29–17, 21–10, 15–12
	Pts: Jenkins 20; Rebs: Wolters, Kuzmić 5 Asts: Wolters 6 PIR: Jenkins 24	Report	Pts: Tomas 14; Rebs: Bilan 6 Asts: Babić 6 PIR: Bilan 22	Arena: Hall Aleksandar Nikolić; Attendance: 5,989; Referees: (Serbia) Ilija Belošević (Croatia) Tomislav Hordov (Slovenia) Mario Majkić

11 April 2017 F2	Crvena zvezda mts (Serbia)	84–73	(Croatia) Cedevita	Belgrade
18:30 (CEST)	Scoring by quarter: 29–18, 28–16, 15–16, 12–23
	Pts: Jenkins 16; Rebs: Lazić 8 Asts: Wolters 5 PIR: Jenkins 23	Report	Pts: Bilan 12; Rebs: Žganec 7 Asts: four players 2 PIR: Shurna 13	Arena: Hall Aleksandar Nikolić; Attendance: 5,896; Referees: (Slovenia) Saša Pukl (Montenegro) Miloš Koljenšić (North Macedonia) Igor Mitrovski

13 April 2017 F3	Cedevita (Croatia)	61–77	(Serbia) Crvena zvezda mts	Zagreb
19:00 (CEST)	Scoring by quarter: 18–22, 21–24, 9–19, 13–12
	Pts: Katić 12; Rebs: Shurna 6 Asts: Krušlin 3 PIR: James, Shurna 13	Report	Pts: Thompson 14; Rebs: Mitrović 6 Asts: Jenkins 8 PIR: Thompson 24	Arena: Dom Sportova 2 Attendance: 3,000; Referees: (Croatia) Sreten Radović (Serbia) Milivoje Jovčić (Montenegro) Igor Dragojević

=== EuroLeague ===
==== Regular season ====
Pos	Team	Pld	W	L	PF	PA	PD	Qualification
7	(Spain) Baskonia	30	17	13	2445	2376	+69	Advance to Playoffs
8	(Turkey) Darüşşafaka Doğuş	30	16	14	2358	2353	+5	Advance to Playoffs
9	(Serbia) Crvena zvezda mts	30	16	14	2203	2196	+7	
10	(Lithuania) Žalgiris	30	14	16	2350	2391	−41	
11	(Spain) FC Barcelona Lassa	30	12	18	2134	2232	−98	

Source: EuroLeague
Rules for classification: All points scored in extra period(s) will not be counted in the standings, nor for any tie-break situation.

==== Results by round ====
Round	1	2	3	4	5	6	7	8	9	10	11	12	13	14	15	16	17	18	19	20	21	22	23	24	25	26	27	28	29	30
Ground	H	A	H	A	H	A	A	H	A	H	A	H	A	H	H	A	H	A	A	H	H	A	H	H	A	A	H	A	H	A
Result	L	W	W	L	L	L	W	W	L	L	L	W	L	W	W	W	W	W	W	W	L	L	W	W	L	W	L	L	W	L
Position	12	10	5	8	11	12	11	9	10	12	12	9	10	9	8	7	7	7	5	5	5	6	6	6	7	7	8	8	8	9

Source: Competitive matches
Ground: A = Away; H = Home; R = Rest. Result: L = Loss; W = Win; R = Rest; P = Postponed.

Win Loss

==== Matches ====
13 October 2016 1	Crvena zvezda mts (Serbia)	70–73	(Turkey) Darüşşafaka Doğuş	Belgrade
21:00 (CEST)	Scoring by quarter: 24–17, 20–13, 8–16, 18–27
	Pts: Kuzmić 16; Rebs: Kuzmić 9 Asts: Jović 7 PIR: Kuzmić 24	Boxscore	Pts: Clyburn 19; Rebs: Moerman 11; Asts: Wanamaker 4 PIR: Clyburn 19	Arena: Aleksandar Nikolić; Attendance: 5,823; Referees: Miguel Pérez Pérez (ESP), Elias Koromilas (GRE), Jurgis Laurinavičius (LTU)

21 October 2016 2	Galatasaray Odeabank (Turkey)	83–85	(Serbia) Crvena zvezda mts	Istanbul
19:00 (CEST)	Scoring by quarter: 30–17, 17–30, 20–22, 16–16
	Pts: Daye 24; Rebs: Daye 8 Asts: Güler 7 PIR: Daye, Tyus 27	Boxscore	Pts: Simonović 23; Rebs: Kuzmić 7 Asts: Jović 9 PIR: Simonović 24	Arena: Abdi İpekçi Arena; Attendance: 4,497; Referees: Fernando Rocha (POR), Ioannis Foufis (GRE), Robert Vyklický (CZE)

26 October 2016 3	Crvena zvezda mts (Serbia)	76–65	(Spain) FC Barcelona Lassa	Belgrade
19:00 (CEST)	Scoring by quarter: 9–16, 31–15, 20–17, 16–17
	Pts: Gudurić 21; Rebs: Kuzmić, Simonović 5 Asts: Jenkins 7 PIR: Gudurić 30	Boxscore	Pts: Oleson 15; Rebs: Claver 10; Asts: Oleson, Rice 5 PIR: Claver, Oleson 18	Arena: Kombank Arena; Attendance: 18,150; Referees: Borys Ryzhyk (UKR), Tolga Sahin (ITA), Clemens Fritz (GER)

28 October 2016 4	Panathinaikos Superfoods (Greece)	70–59	(Serbia) Crvena zvezda mts	Athens
20:15 (CEST)	Scoring by quarter: 23–14, 23–11, 15–16, 9–18
	Pts: Gist 17; Rebs: Bourousis 8 Asts: Calathes 5 PIR: Bourousis 18	Boxscore	Pts: Kuzmić 15; Rebs: Kuzmić 15; Asts: Wolters 3 PIR: Kuzmić 27	Arena: Olympic Sports Center Athens; Attendance: 9,669; Referees: Luigi Lamonica (ITA), Oļegs Latiševs (LAT), Sašo Petek (SLO)

4 November 2016 5	Crvena zvezda mts (Serbia)	63–70	(Spain) Baskonia	Belgrade
19:00 (CET)	Scoring by quarter: 15–22, 13–15, 20–22, 15–11
	Pts: Gudurić 12; Rebs: Jenkins 8 Asts: Gudurić 4 PIR: Bjelica, Gudurić 14	Boxscore	Pts: Beaubois, Larkin 16; Rebs: Voigtmann 8 Asts: Larkin 6 PIR: Larkin 18	Arena: Kombank Arena; Attendance: 16,578 (tentative); Referees: Jakub Zamojski (POL), Petros Papapetrou (GRE), Amit Balak (ISR)

10 November 2016 6	UNICS (Russia)	65–62	(Serbia) Crvena zvezda mts	Kazan
17:00 (CET)	Scoring by quarter: 17–17, 10–15, 14–11, 24–19
	Pts: Langford 23; Rebs: Williams 9 Asts: Colom 5 PIR: Langford 26	Boxscore	Pts: Wolters 11; Rebs: Kuzmić 7 Asts: Jović 4 PIR: Kuzmić 17	Arena: Basket Hall Kazan; Attendance: 3,001; Referees: Matej Boltauzer (SLO), Robert Lottermoser (GER), Ersan Kartal (TUR)

15 November 2016 7	Brose Bamberg (Germany)	78–79	(Serbia) Crvena zvezda mts	Bamberg
20:00 (CET)	Scoring by quarter: 14–11, 15–27, 32–20, 17–21
	Pts: Melli 16; Rebs: Melli 10; Asts: Zisis 9 PIR: Melli 24	Boxscore	Pts: Bjelica 18; Rebs: Kuzmić 7 Asts: Jović 5 PIR: Bjelica 22	Arena: Brose Arena; Attendance: 6,249; Referees: Christos Christodoulou (GRE), Emin Moğulkoç (TUR), Sérgio Silva (POR)

17 November 2016 8	Crvena zvezda mts (Serbia)	83–70	(Italy) EA7 Emporio Armani Milan	Belgrade
19:00 (CET)	Scoring by quarter: 14–19, 23–13, 17–14, 29–24
	Pts: Simonović 23; Rebs: Bjelica, Kuzmić 7 Asts: Wolters 6 PIR: Simonović 22	Boxscore	Pts: Gentile 14; Rebs: Raduljica 6 Asts: Kalnietis 4 PIR: Gentile, Simon 12	Arena: Kombank Arena; Attendance: 10,279; Referees: Fernando Rocha (POR), Daniel Hierrezuelo (ESP), Anne Panther (GER)

24 November 2016 9	Anadolu Efes (Turkey)	100–79	(Serbia) Crvena zvezda mts	Istanbul
18:00 (CET)	Scoring by quarter: 21–21, 26–19, 27–24, 26–15
	Pts: Brown 20; Rebs: Honeycutt 13; Asts: Heurtel 7 PIR: Brown 38	Boxscore	Pts: Jenkins 20; Rebs: Kuzmić 6 Asts: Jović 7 PIR: Jenkins 21	Arena: Abdi İpekçi Arena; Attendance: 3,281; Referees: Emilio Pérez Pizarro (ESP), Ioannis Foufis (GRE), Moritz Reiter (GER)

2 December 2016 10	Crvena zvezda mts (Serbia)	79–88	(Lithuania) Žalgiris	Belgrade
19:00 (CET)	Scoring by quarter: 16–24, 28–18, 22–24, 13–22
	Pts: Bjelica 19; Rebs: Bjelica 5 Asts: Jović, Wolters 5 PIR: Bjelica, Wolters 23	Boxscore	Pts: Kavaliauskas 20; Rebs: Lima, Westermann 7 Asts: Westermann 8 PIR: Kavaliauskas 24	Arena: Aleksandar Nikolić; Attendance: 6,453; Referees: Carmelo Paternicò (ITA), Carlos Peruga (ESP), Amit Balak (ISR)

8 December 2016 11	Fenerbahçe (Turkey)	87–72	(Serbia) Crvena zvezda mts	Istanbul
18:45 (CET)	Scoring by quarter: 20–18, 21–13, 27–19, 19–22
	Pts: Udoh 15; Rebs: Udoh 9 Asts: Sloukas 9 PIR: Udoh 34	Boxscore	Pts: Simonović 14; Rebs: Kuzmić 10; Asts: Wolters 4 PIR: Simonović 14	Arena: Fenerbahçe Ülker Sports Arena; Attendance: 9,017; Referees: Miguel Perez Perez (ESP), Fernando Rocha (POR), Tomazs Trawicki (POL)

15 December 2016 12	Crvena zvezda mts (Serbia)	83–58	(Israel) Maccabi Tel Aviv	Belgrade
20:00 (CET)	Scoring by quarter: 19–14, 23–10, 23–18, 18–16
	Pts: Simonović 14; Rebs: Bjelica 6 Asts: Jović 9 PIR: Simonović 22	Boxscore	Pts: Seeley 15; Rebs: Zirbes 6 Asts: Pnini 5 PIR: Zirbes 16	Arena: Aleksandar Nikolić; Attendance: 6,489; Referees: Christos Christodoulou (GRE), Daniel Hierrezuelo (ESP), Emin Moğulkoç (TUR)

20 December 2016 13	Olympiacos (Greece)	73–65	(Serbia) Crvena zvezda mts	Piraeus
20:00 (CET)	Scoring by quarter: 22–18, 23–16, 11–9, 17–22
	Pts: Lojeski 18; Rebs: Milutinov, Papanikolaou 6 Asts: Spanoulis 5 PIR: Lojeski 20	Boxscore	Pts: Jović 16; Rebs: Kuzmić 14; Asts: Jenkins 5 PIR: Kuzmić 18	Arena: Peace and Friendship Stadium; Attendance: 7,500 (tentative); Referees: Saša Pukl (SLO), Carmelo Paternicò (ITA), Anne Panther (GER)

22 December 2016 14	Crvena zvezda mts (Serbia)	82–70	(Spain) Real Madrid	Belgrade
19:00 (CET)	Scoring by quarter: 20–19, 23–16, 19–16, 20–19
	Pts: Simonović 20; Rebs: Kuzmić 8 Asts: Jović 6 PIR: Simonović 22	Boxscore	Pts: Taylor 25; Rebs: Ayón, Randolph 5 Asts: Ayón 7 PIR: Taylor 27	Arena: Aleksandar Nikolić; Attendance: 6,498; Referees: Ioannis Foufis (GRE), Petri Mäntylä (FIN), Marcin Kowalski (POL)

29 December 2016 15	Crvena zvezda mts (Serbia)	78–67	(Russia) CSKA Moscow	Belgrade
19:00 (CET)	Scoring by quarter: 27–14, 21–20, 16–22, 14–11
	Pts: Kuzmić 16; Rebs: Kuzmić 10; Asts: Jenkins 6 PIR: Kuzmić 31	Boxscore	Pts: Vorontsevich 21; Rebs: Augustine 6 Asts: Jackson 8 PIR: Vorontsevich 19	Arena: Kombank Arena; Attendance: 18,487; Referees: Juan Carlos García González (ESP), Emin Moğulkoç (TUR), David Romano (ISR)

6 January 2017 16	Žalgiris (Lithuania)	61–77	(Serbia) Crvena zvezda mts	Kaunas
19:00 (CET)	Scoring by quarter: 7–21, 15–26, 17–14, 22–16
	Pts: Jankūnas 10; Rebs: Kavaliauskas 7 Asts: Lekavičius 7 PIR: Lekavičius 15	Boxscore	Pts: Simonović 16; Rebs: Dangubić 6 Asts: Bjelica 8 PIR: Lazić 20	Arena: Žalgirio Arena; Attendance: 10,433; Referees: Spiros Gkontas (GRE), Benjamín Jiménez (ESP), Clemens Fritz (GER)

12 January 2017 17	Crvena zvezda mts (Serbia)	75–73	(Turkey) Fenerbahçe	Belgrade
20:45 (CET)	Scoring by quarter: 23–23, 21–19, 17–17, 14–14
	Pts: Kuzmić 21; Rebs: Kuzmić 8 Asts: Jović 7 PIR: Kuzmić 28	Boxscore	Pts: Udoh, Datome 16; Rebs: Bogdanović 6 Asts: Bogdanović 6 PIR: Udoh 25	Arena: Aleksandar Nikolić; Attendance: 7,648; Referees: Robert Lottermoser (GER), Elias Koromilas (GRE), Robert Vyklický (CZE)

19 January 2017 18	Maccabi Tel Aviv (Israel)	67–71	(Serbia) Crvena zvezda mts	Tel Aviv
20:05 (CET)	Scoring by quarter: 17–16, 17–17, 20–15, 13–23
	Pts: Goudelock 19; Rebs: Smith 9 Asts: Ohayon 5 PIR: Goudelock 23	Boxscore	Pts: Jović 14; Rebs: Kuzmić 9 Asts: Jović 7 PIR: Kuzmić 17	Arena: Menora Mivtachim Arena; Attendance: 11,060; Referees: Fernando Rocha (POR), Juan Carlos García González (ESP), Ioannis Foufis (GRE)

24 January 2017 19	Baskonia (Spain)	69–87	(Serbia) Crvena zvezda mts	Vitoria-Gasteiz
21:30 (CET)	Scoring by quarter: 15–25, 12–25, 22–20, 20–17
	Pts: Larkin 16; Rebs: Voigtmann 6 Asts: Larkin, Hanga 4 PIR: Larkin 19	Boxscore	Pts: Simonović 23; Rebs: Kuzmić 6 Asts: Jović 12; PIR: Jović 29	Arena: Fernando Buesa Arena; Attendance: 9,542; Referees: Luigi Lamonica (ITA), Oļegs Latiševs (LAT), Jurgis Laurinavičius (LTU)

26 January 2017 20	Crvena zvezda mts (Serbia)	72–66	(Greece) Panathinaikos Superfoods	Belgrade
19:00 (CET)	Scoring by quarter: 20–14, 19–19, 18–23, 15–10
	Pts: Simonović 13; Rebs: Kuzmić 14; Asts: Jović 8 PIR: Kuzmić 24	Boxscore	Pts: Gabriel 23; Rebs: Rivers, Gentile 6 Asts: N. Calathes 4 PIR: Gabriel 23	Arena: Aleksandar Nikolić; Attendance: 6,387; Referees: Saša Pukl (SLO), Jakub Zamojski (POL), Sérgio Silva (POR)

3 February 2017 21	Crvena zvezda mts (Serbia)	72–86	(Turkey) Anadolu Efes	Belgrade
20:45 (CET)	Scoring by quarter: 20–16, 16–31, 16–14, 20–25
	Pts: Simonović 17; Rebs: Kuzmić 6 Asts: Jenkins 7 PIR: Simonović 17	Boxscore	Pts: Brown 20; Rebs: Brown 11; Asts: Heurtel 15; PIR: Brown 33	Arena: Aleksandar Nikolić; Attendance: 6,320; Referees: Damir Javor (SLO), Carmelo Paternicò (ITA), Clemens Fritz (GER)

9 February 2017 22	CSKA Moscow (Russia)	102–80	(Serbia) Crvena zvezda mts	Moscow
19:00 (CET)	Scoring by quarter: 33–26, 25–20, 19–18, 25–16
	Pts: de Colo 25; Rebs: Augustine 6 Asts: de Colo, Jackson 6 PIR: Kurbanov 29	Boxscore	Pts: Mitrović 16; Rebs: Dobrić, Bjelica 3 Asts: Mitrović 9 PIR: Mitrović 26	Arena: Megasport Arena; Attendance: 9,042; Referees: Daniel Hierrezuelo (ESP), Emin Moğulkoç (TUR), Amit Balak (ISR)

23 February 2017 23	Crvena zvezda mts (Serbia)	77–58	(Turkey) Galatasaray Odeabank	Belgrade
19:00 (CET)	Scoring by quarter: 20–17, 28–12, 16–13, 13–16
	Pts: Lazić 17; Rebs: Kuzmić 8 Asts: Jović 8 PIR: Lazić, Kuzmić 23	Boxscore	Pts: Micov 11; Rebs: Arar 6 Asts: Preldžić, Pleiß 3 PIR: Micov 14	Arena: Aleksandar Nikolić; Attendance: 6,016; Referees: Emilio Pérez Pizarro (ESP), Jakub Zamojski (POL), Sérgio Silva (POR)

2 March 2017 24	Crvena zvezda mts (Serbia)	74–60	(Germany) Brose Bamberg	Belgrade
19:00 (CET)	Scoring by quarter: 17–9, 26–20, 13–14, 18–17
	Pts: Jenkins 18; Rebs: Simonović 9 Asts: Jenkins, Gudurić 4 PIR: Simonović 20	Boxscore	Pts: Causeur 21; Rebs: Melli 6 Asts: three players 3 PIR: Causeur 20	Arena: Aleksandar Nikolić; Attendance: 5,783; Referees: Christos Christodoulou (GRE), Carlos Peruga (ESP), Semen Ovinov (RUS)

10 March 2017 25	Real Madrid (Spain)	98–68	(Serbia) Crvena zvezda mts	Madrid
21:00 (CET)	Scoring by quarter: 38–24, 25–20, 17–13, 18–11
	Pts: three players 12; Rebs: Hunter 8 Asts: Llull 10; PIR: Ayón 25	Boxscore	Pts: Simonović 13; Rebs: Bjelica 8 Asts: Jenkins 5 PIR: Simonović 16	Arena: WiZink Center; Attendance: 10,247; Referees: Robert Lottermoser (GER), Spiros Gkontas (GRE), Marcin Kowalski (POL)

16 March 2017 26	EA7 Emporio Armani Milan (Italy)	71–78	(Serbia) Crvena zvezda mts	Assago
20:45 (CET)	Scoring by quarter: 10–25, 21–18, 19–17, 21–18
	Pts: Hickman 14; Rebs: Pascolo 7 Asts: Cinciarini 4 PIR: McLean 13	Boxscore	Pts: Kuzmić 15; Rebs: Kuzmić 7 Asts: Gudurić 5 PIR: Kuzmić 24	Arena: Mediolanum Forum; Attendance: 11,067; Referees: Daniel Hierrezuelo (ESP), Oļegs Latiševs (LAT), Clemens Fritz (GER)

22 March 2017 27	Crvena zvezda mts (Serbia)	64–66(OT)	(Greece) Olympiacos	Belgrade
19:00 (CET)	Scoring by quarter: 9–17, 8–13, 26–12, 15–16, Overtime: 6–8
	Pts: Gudurić 14; Rebs: Kuzmić 8 Asts: Gudurić 3 PIR: Jenkins 16	Boxscore	Pts: Papanikolaou 17; Rebs: Papanikolaou 9 Asts: Mantzaris 5 PIR: Papanikolaou 26	Arena: Kombank Arena; Attendance: 18,170; Referees: Damir Javor (SLO), Juan Carlos García González (ESP), Amit Balak (ISR)

24 March 2017 28	FC Barcelona Lassa (Spain)	67–54	(Serbia) Crvena zvezda mts	Barcelona
21:00 (CET)	Scoring by quarter: 17–18, 15–11, 20–14, 15–11
	Pts: Perperoglou 17; Rebs: Claver 10; Asts: three players 3 PIR: Perperoglou 21	Boxscore	Pts: three players 8 Rebs: Simonović 8 Asts: Simonović 3 PIR: Simonović 14	Arena: Palau Blaugrana; Attendance: 3,629; Referees: Christos Christodoulou (GRE), Piotr Pastusiak (POL), Sérgio Silva (POR)

31 March 2017 29	Crvena zvezda mts (Serbia)	83–65	(Russia) UNICS	Belgrade
19:00 (CEST)	Scoring by quarter: 10–14, 30–17, 17–18, 26–16
	Pts: Bjelica 19; Rebs: Mitrović 5 Asts: Wolters 6 PIR: Bjelica 22	Boxscore	Pts: Langford 16; Rebs: Parakhouski, Banić 6 Asts: Colom 6 PIR: Colom 19	Arena: Kombank Arena; Attendance: 9,332; Referees: Borys Ryzhyk (UKR), Petros Papapetrou (GRE), Aare Halliko (EST)

7 April 2017 30	Darüşşafaka Doğuş (Turkey)	78–62	(Serbia) Crvena zvezda mts	Istanbul
19:00 (CEST)	Scoring by quarter: 25–14, 18–18, 12–17, 23–13
	Pts: Wanamaker 22; Rebs: Žižić 8 Asts: Wilbekin 6 PIR: Wanamaker 25	Boxscore	Pts: Kuzmić 14; Rebs: Kuzmić 6 Asts: Gudurić 3 PIR: Kuzmić 12	Arena: Volkswagen Arena; Attendance: 4,982; Referees: Miguel Pérez Pérez (ESP), Oļegs Latiševs (LAT), Seffi Shemmesh (ISR)

=== Serbian Super League ===
==== Regular season ====
League table

Pos	Team	Pld	W	L	PF	PA	PD	Pts	Qualification or relegation
1	Crvena zvezda mts	14	13	1	1212	940	+272	27	Qualification to the Playoffs
2	Partizan NIS	14	12	2	1182	1099	+83	26	Qualification to the Playoffs
3	FMP	14	9	5	1112	995	+117	23	Qualification to the Playoffs
4	Mega Leks	14	9	5	1177	1133	+44	23	Qualification to the Playoffs
5	Dynamic	14	5	9	1096	1135	−39	19	

Source: Basketball League of Serbia

==== Results by round ====
Round	1	2	3	4	5	6	7	8	9	10	11	12	13	14
Ground	A	H	A	H	A	A	H	H	A	H	A	H	H	A
Result	W	W	W	W	W	W	W	W	L	W	W	W	W	W
Position	1	1	1	1	1	1	1	1	1	1	1	1	1	1

Source: Competitive matches
Ground: A = Away; H = Home; R = Rest. Result: L = Loss; W = Win; R = Rest; P = Postponed.

Win Loss

==== Matches ====
21 April 2017 1	Spartak	54–89	Crvena zvezda mts	Subotica
19:00 (CEST)	Scoring by quarter: 10–20, 12–24, 14–19, 17–26
	Pts: Kesar 10; Rebs: Kesar 8 Asts: Nikolić 3 PIR: Kesar 17	Report	Pts: Bjelica 21; Rebs: Dangubić 6 Asts: Walters 4 PIR: Bjelica 21	Arena: SC Dudova Šuma; Attendance: 1,000; Referees: Vojinović, Juras, Pecelj

25 April 2017 2	Crvena zvezda mts	85–74	Partizan NIS	Belgrade
20:00 (CEST)	Scoring by quarter: 23–16, 19–22, 23–18, 20–18
	Pts: Mitrović 17; Rebs: Wolters 5 Asts: Jenkins 9 PIR: Mitrović 24	Report	Pts: Luković 17; Rebs: Veličković 8 Asts: Ratkovica 6 PIR: Birčević 19	Arena: Aleksandar Nikolić Hall; Attendance: 5,247; Referees: Vojinović, Glišić, Nikolić

29 April 2017 3	FMP	64–91	Crvena zvezda mts	Belgrade
19:00 (CEST)	Scoring by quarter: 23–22, 14–25, 8–27, 19–17
	Pts: Bolden 10; Rebs: Bolden 7 Asts: Čović 6 PIR: Bolden 13	Report	Pts: Simonović 17; Rebs: Thompson 10; Asts: four players 4 PIR: Lazić 22	Arena: Železnik Hall; Attendance: 500; Referees: Nešković, Maričić, Milojević

2 May 2017 4	Crvena zvezda mts	89–85	Mega Leks	Belgrade
19:00 (CEST)	Scoring by quarter: 18–19, 18–19, 22–18, 31–29
	Pts: Dangubić 16; Rebs: Kuzmić, Wolters 5 Asts: Gudurić 5 PIR: Bjelica 23	Report	Pts: Lešić 21; Rebs: Jaramaz 7 Asts: Jaramaz 7 PIR: Jaramaz 23	Arena: Aleksandar Nikolić Hall; Attendance: 1,087; Referees: Nešković, Maričić, Stefanović

6 May 2017 5	Vršac	76–94	Crvena zvezda mts	Vršac
18:00 (CEST)	Scoring by quarter: 8–30, 24–16, 20–24, 24–24
	Pts: Minchev 14; Rebs: Jovović 4 Asts: Đerić 5 PIR: Minchev 23	Report	Pts: Dobrić 28; Rebs: Jović 5 Asts: Jenkins 6 PIR: Dobrić 26	Arena: Millennium Centar; Attendance: 3,000; Referees: Glišić, Mrdak, Vesković

9 May 2017 6	Borac	65–85	Crvena zvezda mts	Čačak
19:00 (CEST)	Scoring by quarter: 21–19, 12–21, 21–25, 11–20
	Pts: A. Todorović 19; Rebs: A. Todorović, N. Todorović 6 Asts: Marinović 5 PIR: A. Todorović 20	Report	Pts: Dobrić 20; Rebs: Dobrić 8 Asts: Jović 6 PIR: Dobrić 28	Arena: Borac Hall; Attendance: 3,000; Referees: Glišić, Nešković, Arsenijević

12 May 2017 7	Crvena zvezda mts	87–68	Dynamic	Belgrade
19:00 (CEST)	Scoring by quarter: 24–16, 17–13, 29–8, 17–31
	Pts: Jenkins 18; Rebs: Thompson 7 Asts: Jović 7 PIR: Jenkins 21	Report	Pts: Brooks 18; Rebs: Brooks, Čakarević 6 Asts: Čakarević 4 PIR: Brooks 15	Arena: Aleksandar Nikolić Hall; Attendance: 897; Referees: Mrdak, Prpa, Pecelj

15 May 2017 8	Crvena zvezda mts	89–60	Spartak	Belgrade
19:00 (CEST)	Scoring by quarter: 28–16, 18–7, 19–20, 24–17
	Pts: Wolters 15; Rebs: Dobrić 8 Asts: Jović 7 PIR: Dobrić 22	Report	Pts: Jelenić 14; Rebs: Prlja 8 Asts: Jelenić, Nikolić 5 PIR: Prlja, Miščević 10	Arena: Aleksandar Nikolić Hall; Attendance: 800; Referees: Vojinović, Juras, Cukalović

18 May 2017 9	Partizan NIS	78–77	Crvena zvezda mts	Belgrade
19:00 (CEST)
	Pts: Veličković, Hatcher 16; Rebs: Veličković 7 Asts: Hatcher, Ratkovica 4 PIR: Veličković 24	Report	Pts: Simonović 20; Rebs: Kuzmić, Mitrović 7 Asts: Jović 5 PIR: Simonović, Gudurić 19	Arena: Aleksandar Nikolić Hall; Attendance: 5,000; Referees: Belošević, Vojinović, Jevtović

22 May 2017 10	Crvena zvezda mts	77–69	FMP	Belgrade
18:00 (CEST)	Scoring by quarter: 25–16, 16–16, 16–10, 20–27
	Pts: Kuzmić 16; Rebs: Dangubić 8 Asts: Mitrović 7 PIR: Dangubić, Kuzmić 17	Report	Pts: Bursać 19; Rebs: Bolden 6 Asts: Ljubičić 4 PIR: Ljubičić 21	Arena: Aleksandar Nikolić Hall; Attendance: 750; Referees: Nesković, Maričić, Milojević

25 May 2017 11	Mega Leks	67–73	Crvena zvezda mts	Sremska Mitrovica
19:30 (CEST)	Scoring by quarter: 18–17, 16–21, 19–20, 14–15
	Pts: Mushidi 16; Rebs: Jaramaz 8 Asts: Novak 5 PIR: Novak 17	Report	Pts: Jović 20; Rebs: Kuzmić 7 Asts: Jović 8 PIR: Jović 20	Arena: Pinki Hall; Attendance: 2,000; Referees: Jovčić, Obrknežević, Nikolić

28 May 2017 12	Crvena zvezda mts	80–55	Vršac	Belgrade
13:00 (CEST)	Scoring by quarter: 19–4, 22–14, 18–16, 21–21
	Pts: Mitrović 11; Rebs: Kuzmić, Jović 7 Asts: Mitrović 4 PIR: Mitrović 23	Report	Pts: Fundić 18; Rebs: Jovović 6 Asts: Đerić 3 PIR: Fundić 17	Arena: Aleksandar Nikolić Hall; Attendance: 500; Referees: Mrdak, Pecelj, Vesković

31 May 2017 13	Crvena zvezda mts	111–56	Borac	Belgrade
19:00 (CEST)	Scoring by quarter: 34–10, 24–12, 27–23, 26–11
	Pts: Lazić, Dobrić 19; Rebs: Mitrović, Bjelica 5 Asts: three players 7 PIR: Lazić 21	Report	Pts: Marinović 15; Rebs: N. Todorović 10; Asts: Marinović 5 PIR: N. Todorović 17	Arena: Aleksandar Nikolić Hall; Attendance: 700; Referees: Maričić, Cukalović, Stefanović

3 June 2017 14	Dynamic	69–85	Crvena zvezda mts	Belgrade
20:00 (CEST)	Scoring by quarter: 19–23, 18–21, 16–21, 16–20
	Pts: Čakarević 17; Rebs: Lazić 9 Asts: three players 5 PIR: Čakarević 22	Report	Pts: Lazić 16; Rebs: Jović 7 Asts: Jović 8 PIR: Kuzmić 17	Arena: Dynamic Arena; Attendance: 500; Referees: Jovčić, Obrknežević, Stefanović

==== Playoffs ====
Semifinals

6 June 2017 SF1	Crvena zvezda mts	85–70	Mega Leks	Belgrade
21:00 (CEST)	Scoring by quarter: 21–21, 25–12, 16–17, 23–20
	Pts: Kuzmić 20; Rebs: Dangubić 9 Asts: Jović 5 PIR: Kuzmić 21	Report	Pts: Novak, Samardžiski 15; Rebs: Samardžiski 8 Asts: Novak, Samardžiski 4 PIR: Samardžiski 24	Arena: Hall Aleksandar Nikolić; Attendance: 3,247; Referees: Belošević, Obrknežević, Stefanović

8 June 2017 SF2	Mega Leks	75–84	Crvena zvezda mts	Sremska Mitrovica
21:00 (CEST)	Scoring by quarter: 26–28, 13–19, 27–20, 9–17
	Pts: Jaramaz 14; Rebs: Mushidi 6 Asts: Novak 11; PIR: Novak 21	Report	Pts: Thompson 15; Rebs: three players 6 Asts: Gudurić, Jović 5 PIR: Thompson 21	Arena: Sports Hall Pinki; Attendance: 1,800; Referees: Jovčić, Nešković, Jevtović

Finals

12 June 2017 F1	Crvena zvezda mts	94–66	FMP	Belgrade
21:00 (CEST)	Scoring by quarter: 23–11, 15–13, 34–15, 22–27
	Pts: Dobrić 21; Rebs: Mitrović 6 Asts: Jenkins 6 PIR: Dobrić 22	Report	Pts: Apić 13; Rebs: Davidovac 6 Asts: Davidovac 6 PIR: Davidovac 15	Arena: Hall Aleksandar Nikolić; Attendance: 4,500; Referees: Belošević, Jovčić, Vojinović

14 June 2017 F2	FMP	76–91	Crvena zvezda mts	Železnik
18:30 (CEST)	Scoring by quarter: 18–30, 22–22, 14–19, 22–20
	Pts: Austin 25; Rebs: Davidovac 8 Asts: Čović 11; PIR: Austin 30	Report	Pts: Gudurić 19; Rebs: Mitrović 7 Asts: Jenkins 5 PIR: Mitrović 22	Arena: Železnik Hall; Attendance: 1,500; Referees: Nešković, Glišić, M. Juras

16 June 2017 F3	Crvena zvezda mts	87–57	FMP	Belgrade
20:00 (CEST)	Scoring by quarter: 30–9, 16–15, 29–18, 12–15
	Pts: Dobrić 25; Rebs: Mitrović 6 Asts: Jenkins 8 PIR: Dobrić 28	Report	Pts: Radanov, Austin 13; Rebs: Davidovac 7 Asts: Ljubičić 4 PIR: Davidovac 10	Arena: Hall Aleksandar Nikolić; Attendance: 7,103; Referees: Obrknežević, Nikolić, Jevtović

=== Radivoj Korać Cup ===
16 February 2017 Quarterfinals	Crvena zvezda mts	99–47	Vršac	Niš
19:30	Scoring by quarter: 30–7, 27–10, 24–15, 18–15
Arena Sport	Pts: Simonović 19; Rebs: Mitrović 10; Asts: Mitrović 7 PIR: Mitrović 27	Boxscore	Pts: Savović 11; Rebs: Jeftić 9 Asts: Jeftić 3 PIR: Jeftić 3	Arena: Čair Sports Center; Attendance: 4,000; Referees: Glišić, Jevtović, Arsenijević

18 February 2017 Semifinals	Crvena zvezda mts	76–60	FMP	Niš
17:00	Scoring by quarter: 27–14, 21–18, 19–13, 9–15
Arena Sport	Pts: Gudurić 21; Rebs: Kuzmić 5 Asts: Jović 6 PIR: Gudurić 19	Boxscore	Pts: Ljubičić 18; Rebs: Bolden 9 Asts: Čović, Bolden 3 PIR: Austin 21	Arena: Čair Sports Center; Attendance: 4,000; Referees: Jovčić, vojinović, Obrknežević

19 February 2017 Finals	Crvena zvezda mts	74–64	Partizan NIS	Niš
21:00	Scoring by quarter: 23–23, 13–11, 16–13, 22–17
Arena Sport	Pts: Simonović, Gudurić 18; Rebs: Thompson 6 Asts: Jović 7 PIR: Gudurić 22	Boxscore	Pts: Vrabac 12; Rebs: Veličković 7 Asts: Pot 4 PIR: Vrabac 15	Arena: Čair Sports Center; Attendance: 4,500; Referees: Belošević, Jovčić, Vojinović

== Individual awards ==
=== EuroLeague ===
MVP of the Month

- January 2017: (Serbia) Ognjen Kuzmić

Individual statistics leaders

- Steals per game: (United States) Charles Jenkins (2.07)

=== Adriatic League ===
Finals MVP

- (United States) Charles Jenkins

Ideal Starting Five

- PG: (Serbia) Stefan Jović
- SG: (United States) Charles Jenkins
- SF: (Serbia) Marko Simonović

MVP of the Round

- 11th: (Serbia) Ognjen Kuzmić
- 15th: (Serbia) Marko Simonović
- 16th: (Serbia) Luka Mitrović
- SF1: (Serbia) Ognjen Kuzmić
- SF3: (United States) Charles Jenkins
- F1: (United States) Charles Jenkins
- F2: (United States) Charles Jenkins
- F3: (United States) Deon Thompson

=== Serbian Super League ===
Finals MVP

- (Serbia) Ognjen Dobrić

MVP of the Round

- 8th: (Serbia) Ognjen Dobrić

=== Radivoj Korać Cup ===
MVP

- (Serbia) Marko Gudurić

Top Scorer

- (Serbia) Marko Simonović

== Statistics ==
Legend
GP	Games played	GS	Games started	MPG	Minutes per game
FG%	Field-goal percentage	3FG%	3-point field-goal percentage	FT%	Free-throw percentage
RPG	Rebounds per game	APG	Assists per game	SPG	Steals per game
BPG	Blocks per game	PPG	Points per game	PIR	PIR per game

*	Led the league
Player	Left during season

=== Adriatic League ===
Player	GP	GS	MPG	FG%	3FG%	FT%	RPG	APG	SPG	BPG	PPG	PIR
Milko Bjelica	31	0	16.22	.488	.303	.767	3.1	1.1	0.5	0.4	9.1	9.1
Nemanja Dangubić	25	0	20.25	.417	.324	.680	2.8	1.6	0.8	0.1	7.8	6.9
Ognjen Dobrić	29	0	7.10	.462	.292	.750	0.6	0.5	0.2	0.1	2.5	1.7
Marko Gudurić	30	0	18.38	.508	.398	.845	2.6	2.4	1.0	0.1	9.0	10.0
Charles Jenkins	32	0	22.28	.476	.506	.847	2.0	3.1	1.3	0.3	9.8	10.6
Stefan Jović	23	0	20.08	.516	.351	.594	2.7	5.9	1.1	0.3	6.9	12.6
Ognjen Kuzmić	30	0	19.33	.663	.000	.699	5.5	0.8	0.0	0.2	9.7	13.8
Branko Lazić	32	0	21.47	.410	.363	.863	2.3	1.2	1.3	0.2	5.7	6.6
Luka Mitrović	30	0	19.28	.485	.349	.686	5.4	2.4	0.5	0.4	7.1	10.7
Petar Rakićević	8	0	7.12	.571	.667	.667	1.4	1.1	0.6	0.1	2.8	3.6
Boriša Simanić	12	0	6.18	.500	.412	.000	1.3	0.4	0.2	0.3	2.9	2.1
Marko Simonović	32	0	21.22	.458	.380	.747	2.3	1.0	1.0	0.3	10.2	9.6
Deon Thompson	14	0	12.05	.566	.000	.706	2.8	0.6	0.4	0.3	5.1	5.1
Nate Wolters	25	0	19.00	.464	.260	.757	3.0	3.3	0.8	0.2	9.2	11.9
Nikola Rebić	6	0	15.00	.444	.385	.667	0.8	2.8	0.8	0.0	4.5	6.5

Last updated: July 8, 2017.
Source: ABA

=== EuroLeague ===
Player	GP	GS	MPG	FG%	3FG%	FT%	RPG	APG	SPG	BPG	PPG	PIR
Milko Bjelica	30	1	15.37	.464	.193	.795	3.0	1.1	0.5	0.3	7.4	7.5
Nemanja Dangubić	24	24	19.20	.449	.296	.842	2.0	0.7	0.6	0.1	5.3	2.5
Ognjen Dobrić	13	0	5.16	.700	.167	.333	0.5	0.2	0.3	0.0	1.6	0.6
Marko Gudurić	29	4	18.47	.488	.304	.859	2.1	2.1	0.6	0.1	7.8	6.4
Charles Jenkins	30	29	26.05	.452	.425	.848	1.9	2.7	2.1*	0.1	9.4	9.5
Stefan Jović	23	23	23.53	.495	.291	.613	2.1	5.6	1.3	0.0	7.5	9.3
Ognjen Kuzmić	30	30	20.41	.549	.000	.707	7.0	1.0	1.0	0.6	9.4	13.9
Branko Lazić	30	6	23.37	.583	.368	.571	2.2	0.3	1.4	0.1	4.4	4.0
Luka Mitrović	28	27	15.42	.505	.167	.536	2.3	1.4	0.5	0.1	4.1	4.3
Petar Rakićević	Did not play											
Boriša Simanić	3	2	5.36	.333	.000	.000	1.0	0.3	0.0	0.0	0.7	-1.0
Marko Simonović	30	3	26.43	.549	.390	.824	3.6	0.7	0.8	0.5	12.6	11.7
Deon Thompson	13	0	10.28	.561	.000	.500	1.5	0.5	0.3	0.3	4.3	4.4
Nate Wolters	27	1	15.04	.458	.380	.781	2.1	2.2	0.7	0.0	7.1	6.8
Nikola Rebić	2	0	7.25	.250	.000	.000	0.5	1.0	0.0	0.0	1.0	1.5

Last updated: 9 April 2017.
Source: EuroLeague

=== Serbian Super League ===
Player	GP	GS	MPG	FG%	3FG%	FT%	RPG	APG	SPG	BPG	PPG	PIR
Milko Bjelica	18	1	13.57	.565	.423	.821	2.4	1.0	0.4	0.2	8.3	8.7
Nemanja Dangubić	19	14	22.25	.519	.316	.857	3.8	2.2	0.6	0.0	7.9	9.7
Ognjen Dobrić	19	9	15.16	.706	.554*	.882	2.3	1.2	0.7	0.3	9.5	11.1
Marko Gudurić	19	1	20.47	.612	.404	.862	2.5	2.8	0.9	0.1	8.1	9.9
Charles Jenkins	18	11	21.13	.458	.419	.714	1.8	3.2	1.8	0.1	8.1	8.8
Stefan Jović	13	12	19.09	.653	.231	.400	3.6	5.5	1.5	0.5	6.6	11.9
Ognjen Kuzmić	18	18	15.07	.677	.000	.680	4.4	0.7	0.6	0.4	9.1	12.3
Branko Lazić	13	8	22.32	.536	.415	.833	2.4	1.4	1.0	0.1	8.2	8.7
Luka Mitrović	19	18	19.22	.610	.500	.636	4.8	2.4	0.8	0.5	6.8	11.3
Petar Rakićević	8	0	8.15	.167	.000	.000	0.8	1.3	0.0	0.0	0.6	-0.9
Boriša Simanić	9	0	8.07	.917	.400	.667	0.9	0.8	0.2	0.2	4.0	4.2
Marko Simonović	16	0	17.15	.450	.407	.763	2.1	1.2	0.6	0.1	9.1	8.6
Deon Thompson	17	0	13.21	.600	.000	.640	3.0	0.7	0.5	0.6	5.5	7.5
Nate Wolters	13	2	17.51	.558	.379	.850	2.3	2.7	0.9	0.1	8.3	10.8

Last updated: 20 June 2017.
Source: KLS
