= Milko Bjelica =

Montenegrin basketball player

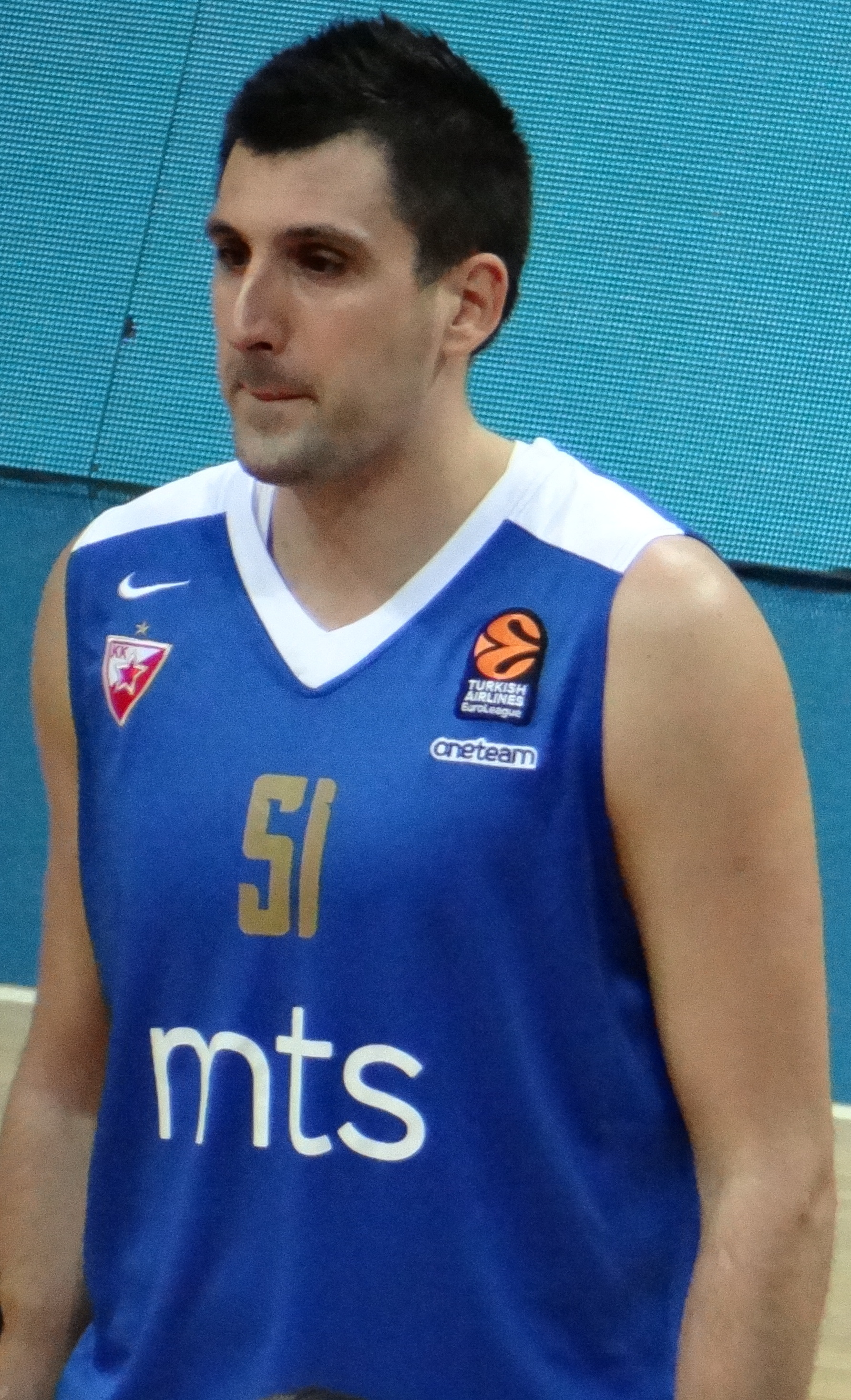
- Bjelica with Crvena zvezda

Personal information
- Born: 4 June 1984 (age 42) Belgrade, SR Serbia, SFR Yugoslavia
- Listed height: 2.08 m (6 ft 10 in)
- Listed weight: 108 kg (238 lb)

Career information
- NBA draft: 2006: undrafted
- Playing career: 2001–2026
- Position: Power forward / center

Career history
- 2001–2006: Crvena zvezda
- 2006–2007: Phantoms Braunschweig
- 2007–2008: Köln 99ers
- 2008–2011: Lietuvos rytas
- 2011–2013: Saski Baskonia
- 2013–2015: Anadolu Efes
- 2015–2016: Darüşşafaka
- 2016–2018: Crvena zvezda
- 2018: Tecnyconta Zaragoza
- 2018–2019: Alvark Tokyo
- 2019–2021: Mornar
- 2021–2022: Al Shamal Doha
- 2022: Al Ittihad Jeddah
- 2022–2023: Nadim Souaid Academy
- 2024: Tainan TSG GhostHawks
- 2024–2026: Saitama Broncos

Career highlights
- ABA League champion (2017); Serbian League champion (2017); EuroCup champion (2009); Japanese League champion (2019); 2× LKL champion (2009, 2010); 2× LKF Cup winner (2009, 2010); Baltic League champion (2009); LKL All-Star (2011); 3× Serbian Cup winner (2004, 2006, 2017); Turkish Cup winner (2015)

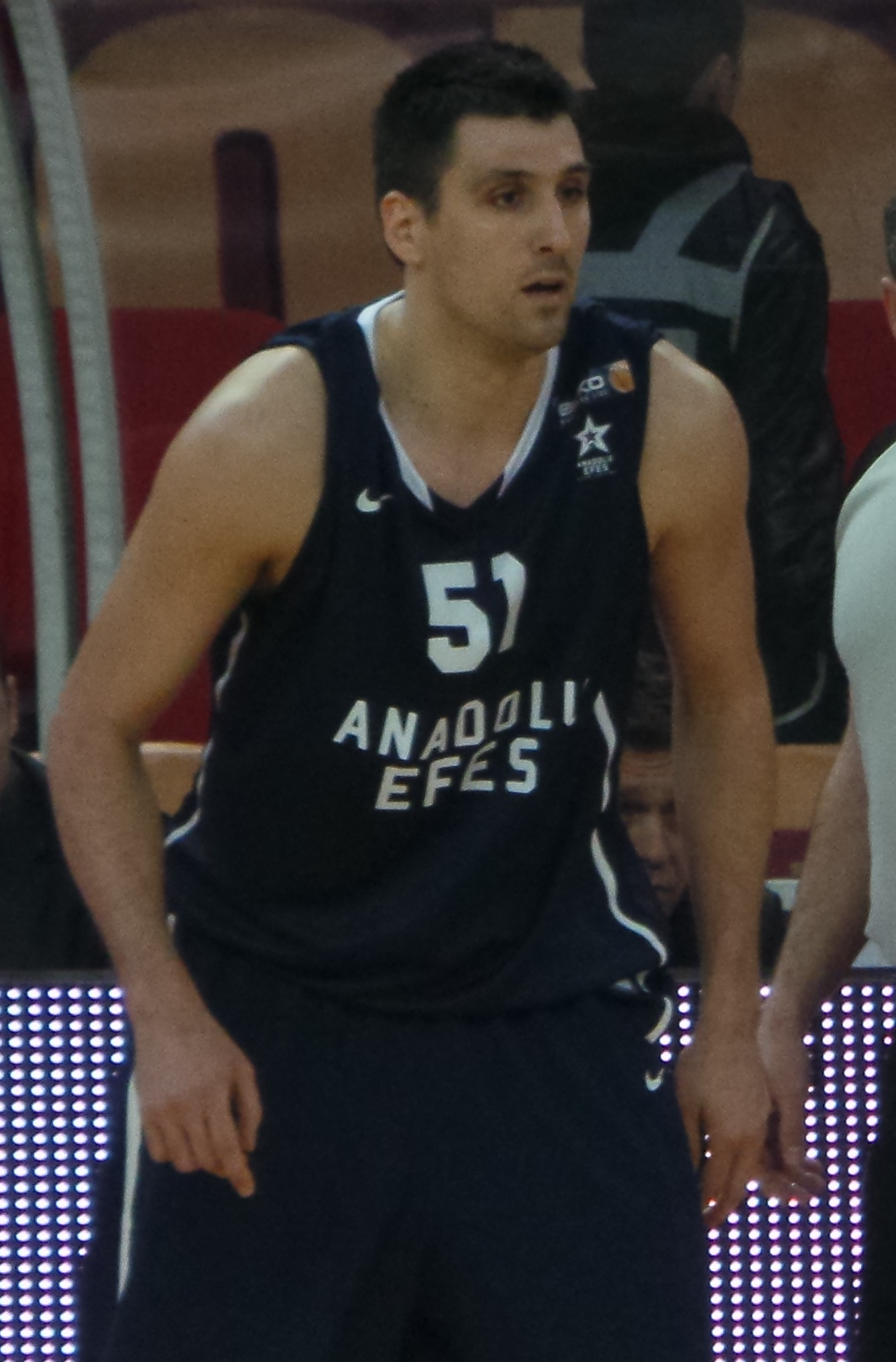
Bjelica with Anadolu Efes

Milko Bjelica (Serbian Cyrillic: Милко Бјелица; born 4 June 1984) is a Serbian-born Montenegrin professional basketball player

== Professional career ==
He began his professional career with Crvena zvezda, where he spent five seasons. He then played in Germany with Phantoms Braunschweig and Köln 99ers. In 2008 he signed with Lietuvos rytas, and made his EuroLeague debut during the 2009–10 season.

In July 2011 he signed a two-year deal with Saski Baskonia. On 28 October 2013 he re-signed with Saski Baskonia on a short-term deal. On 30 December 2013 he signed with the Turkish Euroleague team Anadolu Efes for the remainder of the season. On 9 July 2014 he extended his contract with Efes for two more years. On 22 June 2015 he left Efes and signed with Darüşşafaka for the 2015–16 season.

On 8 September 2016 Bjelica returned to Crvena zvezda, signing a two-year contract. On 17 April 2018, after parting ways with Crvena zvezda, Bjelica returned to Spain, signing with Basket Zaragoza for the remainder of the season.

On January 5, 2024, Bjelica signed with Tainan TSG GhostHawks of the T1 League. On June 28, Bjelica signed with Saitama Broncos of the B.League.

== Career statistics ==
Legend
GP	Games played	GS	Games started	MPG	Minutes per game
FG%	Field-goal percentage	3P%	3-point field-goal percentage	FT%	Free-throw percentage
RPG	Rebounds per game	APG	Assists per game	SPG	Steals per game
BPG	Blocks per game	PPG	Points per game	PIR	Performance index rating
**Bold**	Career high

Led the league

=== Euroleague ===
Year	Team	GP	GS	MPG	FG%	3P%	FT%	RPG	APG	SPG	BPG	PPG	PIR
2009–10	Lietuvos Rytas	10	2	21.5	.462	.154	.667	4.3	1.1	.4	.2	11.8	9.0
2010–11	Lietuvos Rytas	16	10	**26.1**	.533	.279	.727	**4.7**	**1.4**	.7	**.4**	12.3	12.1
2011–12	Baskonia	8	2	23.7	.492	.294	.842	3.9	.8	**.8**	.1	10.6	9.5
2012–13	Baskonia	27	**19**	17.3	.406	.378	.750	2.7	1.2	.5	.2	5.4	5.7
2013–14	Baskonia	8	3	21.3	**.594**	.353	**.952**	4.4	1.3	.3	**.4**	**12.8**	**13.8**
2013–14	Anadolu Efes	14	3	22.8	.459	.270	.913	2.5	1.2	.6	.1	9.4	7.5
2014–15	Anadolu Efes	28	7	16.2	.462	**.415**	.736	2.5	.8	.2	.3	7.8	6.8
2015–16	Darüşşafaka	24	6	19.1	.434	.354	.679	3.4	.8	.4	.1	7.5	7.5
2016–17	Crvena zvezda	**30**	1	15.6	.385	.193	.795	3.0	1.1	.5	.3	7.4	7.5
2017–18	Crvena zvezda	29	**29**	26.0	.397	.297	.703	3.7	1.3	.4	.2	9.2	8.8
Career		194	82	20.2	.446	.305	.750	3.3	1.1	.4	.2	8.6	8.1

== Personal life ==
Born and raised in Belgrade, Serbia, he internationally represents Montenegro, where his grandfather is from. One of his sisters, Milka, is also a basketball player, while another, Ana is a Serbian volleyball player.

== See also ==
- List of KK Crvena zvezda players with 100 games played
