= Nenad Šulović =

Serbian basketball player

Personal information
- Born: October 3, 1985 (age 41) Belgrade, SFR Yugoslavia
- Listed height: 2.03 m (6 ft 8 in)
- Listed weight: 150 kg (331 lb)

Career information
- NBA draft: 2007: undrafted
- Playing career: 2004–present
- Position: Power forward / center

Career history
- 2004–2006: Beovuk
- 2006–2007: OKK Beograd
- 2007–2008: Polpak Świecie
- 2008–2009: Napredak Kruševac
- 2009: MBK Rieker Komárno
- 2009: CS Otopeni
- 2010: OKK Beograd
- 2010–2011: Napredak Kruševac
- 2011: Radnički Kragujevac
- 2011–2013: Igokea
- 2013–2014: Zepter Vienna
- 2014–2015: Balkan Botevgrad
- 2015: Mega Leks
- 2015–2016: Dinamo București
- 2016–2019: SZTE-Szedeák
- 2019–2020: Pécsi VSK-Veolia
- 2020: SCM U Craiova
- 2020–2024: Dynamic Belgrade

Career highlights
- Bosnian League champion (2013); Bosnian Cup champion (2013); Serbian First League MVP (2011)

Nenad Šulović (Serbian Cyrillic: Ненад Шуловић; born October 3, 1985) is a retired Serbian professional basketball player. Standing at 2.02 m (6 ft 7 1/2 in), he can play both power forward and center positions.

== Professional career ==
Šulović started his career with Beovuk 72. For the 2006–07 season he moved to OKK Beograd. For the 2007–08 season he signed with Polpak Świecie of the Polish Basketball League.

For the 2008–09 season he signed with Napredak Kruševac. In February 2009, he left Napredak and signed with MBK Rieker Komárno of the Slovak Extraliga for the rest of the season.

On June 22, 2009, he signed with the Romanian team CS Otopeni. In December 2009, Otopeni released him. In February 2010, he returned to Serbia and signed with OKK Beograd for the rest of the season.

For the 2010–11 season he returned to Napredak Kruševac. In March 2011, he left Napredak and signed with Radnički Kragujevac for the rest of the season.

On August 18, 2011, he signed with the Bosnian team Igokea. On July 1, 2012, he re-signed with Igokea for one more season. In his second season with the club, he won the Bosnian League and Cup.

In July 2013, he signed with Zepter Vienna of the Österreichische Basketball Bundesliga for the 2013–14 season.

On October 6, 2014, he signed with the Bulgarian team Balkan Botevgrad. On March 2, 2015, he left Balkan and signed with Mega Leks for the rest of the season.

On June 30, 2015, he signed with Dinamo București of Romania.

On September 14, 2016, he signed with SZTE-Szedeák for the 2016–17 season.
