= BLS Playoff MVP =

The Basketball League of Serbia Playoffs MVP, also referred to as the Serbian League Playoffs MVP, is the award bestowed to the player that is deemed to be the "Most Valuable Player" during the playoff of the Basketball League of Serbia. The Basketball League of Serbia is the top-tier level national men's professional club basketball league in Serbia. The award has existed and been awarded by the Serbian League since the 2006–07 season.

== Winners ==
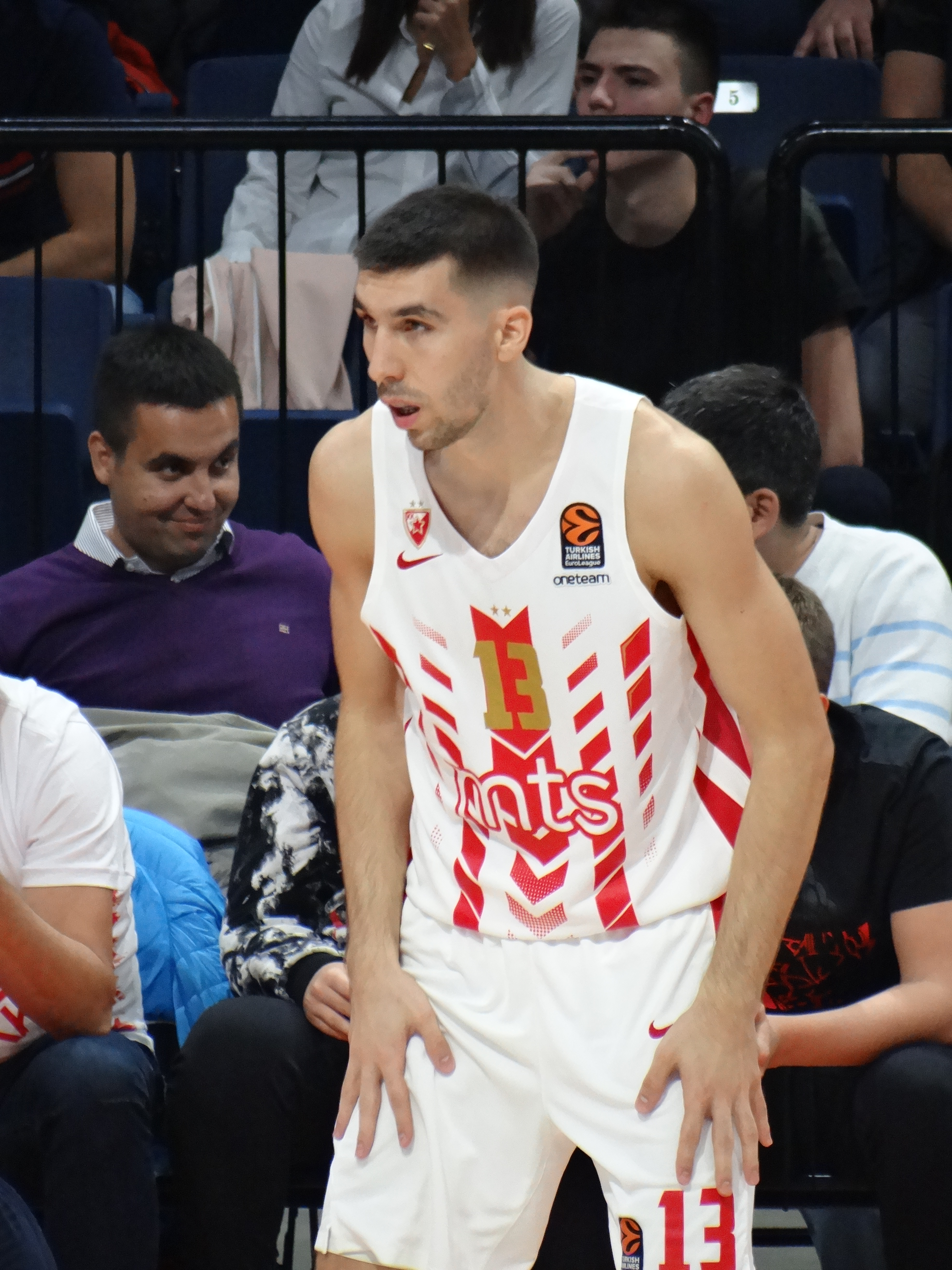
Ognjen Dobrić won the award two times in his career.

Season	Player	Team	Ref.
2006–07	(Serbia) Milan Gurović	Crvena zvezda	
2007–08	(Montenegro) Nikola Peković	Partizan	
2008–09	(Serbia) Novica Veličković	Partizan (2)	
2009–10	(United States) Bo McCalebb	Partizan (3)	
2010–11	(United States) Curtis Jerrells	Partizan (4)	
2011–12	(United States) Omar Thomas	Crvena zvezda (2)	
2012–13	(Serbia) Dragan Milosavljević	Partizan (5)	
2013–14	(Serbia) Bogdan Bogdanović	Partizan (6)	
2014–15	(Serbia) Milan Mačvan	Partizan (7)	
2015–16	(Germany) Maik Zirbes	Crvena zvezda (3)	
2016–17	(Serbia) Ognjen Dobrić	Crvena zvezda (4)	
2017–18	(Slovenia) Alen Omić	Crvena zvezda mts (5)	
2018–19	(United States) Billy Baron	Crvena zvezda mts (6)	
2019–20	Canceled due to COVID-19 pandemic in Serbia		
2020–21	(Serbia) Ognjen Dobrić (2)	Crvena zvezda (7)	
2021–22	(Montenegro) Nikola Ivanović	Crvena zvezda (8)	
2022–23	(Serbia) Luka Mitrović	Crvena zvezda (9)	
2023–24	(Serbia) Dejan Davidovac	Crvena zvezda (10)	
2024–25	(United States) Duane Washington Jr.	Partizan (8)	

== See also ==
- ABA League Finals MVP
