= 2016–17 Basketball League of Serbia =

Mozzart^{1} Basketball League of Serbia
- Season: 2016–17
- Duration: October 8, 2016 – April 12, 2017 (First League); April 21, 2017 – June 5, 2017 (Super League); June 6, 2017 – June 16, 2017 (Playoffs)
- Teams: 18 (Note: Four teams (Crvena zvedza, FMP, Mega and Partizan) will only play starting from the second half of the season.)
- TV partner: Arena Sport

Regular season
- Promoted: Vojvodina; Zlatibor
- Relegated: Smederevo 1953; Konstantin

Finals
- Champions: Crvena zvezda mts (18th title)
- Runners-up: FMP
- Semifinalists: Partizan NIS; Mega Leks
- ^{1} Sponsored league name

The 2016–17 Basketball League of Serbia season is the 11th season of the Basketball League of Serbia, the highest professional basketball league in Serbia. It is also 73rd national championship played by Serbian clubs inclusive of nation's previous incarnations as Yugoslavia and Serbia & Montenegro.

The first half of the season consists of 14 teams and 182–game regular season (26 games for each of the 14 teams) began on October 8, 2016, and ended on April 12, 2017. The second half of the season consists of 4 teams from Adriatic League and the best 4 teams from first half of the season. Playoff starts soon after. The first half is called First League and second is called Super League.

== Teams ==
Location of teams in the 2016–17 Basketball League of Serbia

Team	City	Arena	Capacity	Head coach
Beovuk 72	Belgrade	Vizura Sports Center	1.500	Rajko Mirković
Borac	Čačak	Hala kraj Morave	2.000	Raško Bojić
Crvena zvezda mts	Belgrade	Hall Aleksandar Nikolić	5.878	Dejan Radonjić
Dunav	Stari Banovci	Hala Park		Vuk Stanimirović
Dynamic	Belgrade	Dynamic Arena		Miroslav Nikolić
FMP	Železnik	Železnik Hall	3.000	Dušan Alimpijević
Konstantin	Niš	Čair Sports Center	4.000	Predrag Jaćimović
Mega Leks	Sremska Mitrovica	Sports Hall Pinki	2.500	Dejan Milojević
Metalac	Valjevo	Valjevo Sports Hall	1.500	Mihailo Poček
Mladost Admiral	Zemun	Pinki Hall	2.300	Lazar Spasić
Napredak Rubin	Kruševac	Kruševac Sports Hall	2.500	Oliver Popović
OKK Beograd	Belgrade	SC Šumice	1.300	Darko Kostić
Partizan NIS	Belgrade	Hall Aleksandar Nikolić	5.878	Aleksandar Džikić
Sloga	Kraljevo	Hala Sportova	3.350	Boško Đokić
Smederevo 1953	Smederevo	Sports Hall Smederevo	2.800	Zoran Todorović
Spartak	Subotica	SC Dudova Šuma	3.000	Nebojša Vagić
Tamiš	Pančevo	Strelište Sports Hall	1.100	Bojan Jovičić
Vršac	Vršac	Millennium Center	4.400	Vladimir Đokić

Teams that play in the 2016–17 Adriatic League

== First League ==
=== League table ===
Pos	Team	Pld	W	L	PF	PA	PD	Pts	Qualification or relegation
1	Vršac	26	22	4	2264	2005	+259	48	Qualification to the Super League
2	Borac	26	20	6	2132	1838	+294	46	Qualification to the Super League
3	Dynamic	26	20	6	2151	1949	+202	46	Qualification to the Super League
4	Spartak	26	16	10	2069	1972	+97	42	Qualification to the Super League
5	Dunav	26	14	12	2015	1997	+18	40	
6	Beovuk 72	26	14	12	2139	2162	−23	40	
7	Tamiš	26	13	13	1957	1968	−11	39	
8	Mladost Admiral	26	13	13	2014	1967	+47	39	
9	Metalac	26	12	14	2128	2133	−5	38	
10	Napredak Rubin	26	12	14	2054	2036	+18	38	
11	OKK Beograd	26	11	15	2042	2142	−100	37	
12	Sloga	26	8	18	1902	2070	−168	34	
13	Smederevo 1953	26	4	22	1960	2315	−355	30	Relegation
14	Konstantin	26	3	23	1900	2173	−273	29	Relegation

Source: Basketball League of Serbia

=== Results ===
Home \ Away	BEO	BOR	DUN	DYN	KON	MET	MLA	NAP	OKK	SLO	SME	SPA	TAM	VRS
Beovuk 72		73–82	101–99	74–75	88–76	85–79	73–64	83–102	93–96	86–76	71–67	81–75	86–80	87–91
Borac	87–62		81–69	66–73	94–56	65–70	81–66	90–66	90–61	83–57	75–71	71–50	89–91	78–68
Dunav	74–72	92–70		63–78	95–75	98–87	80–88	94–93	74–73	73–64	75–86	79–85	72–59	89–73
Dynamic	99–93	64–81	69–78		74–69	104–83	66–62	80–89	90–68	81–82	115–70	84–74	78–55	77–76
Konstantin	83–89	79–90	61–63	91–93		80–83	56–76	67–81	76–81	55–63	79–85	88–80	54–79	83–101
Metalac	74–79	80–88	80–75	87–80	101–68		73–78	82–75	84–63	95–83	79–78	80–85	87–78	80–85
Mladost Admiral	93–88	65–77	83–80	74–83	94–67	87–76		88–73	78–83	80–76	97–66	96–99	68–83	77–79
Napredak Rubin	85–76	71–91	72–63	73–85	85–68	97–100	59–65		75–55	72–67	90–77	101–77	75–62	69–75
OKK Beograd	93–84	79–85	67–66	81–89	74–70	89–81	86–74	73–61		76–60	91–93	76–69	77–88	79–80
Sloga	65–70	56–72	60–61	52–61	70–86	81–74	69–75	88–83	121–120		105–84	74–72	79–91	61–82
Smederevo 1953	75–91	65–101	65–68	78–98	68–85	82–89	69–91	88–98	85–71	79–97		64–97	76–89	89–99
Spartak	74–94	82–75	93–74	72–80	78–62	74–68	85–63	85–70	91–75	87–62	86–71		74–60	69–60
Tamiš	86–91	80–82	59–68	70–95	97–81	82–69	68–67	82–74	78–70	76–55	73–60	63–82		69–80
Vršac	112–69	92–88	103–93	88–80	91–85	94–87	72–65	75–65	107–85	96–79	105–69	101–74	79–59	

Legend: Blue = home team win; Red = away team win.

=== Statistical leaders ===
==== PIR ====
Pos	Player	Club	Total PIR
1	(Jamaica) Kimani Ffriend	Dynamic	672
2	(Serbia) Stefan Fundić	Beovuk 72	668
3	(Serbia) Slaviša Bogavac	Konstantin	435

==== Points ====
Pos	Player	Club	Total Points
1	(Serbia) Brano Đukanović	Metalac	496
2	(Jamaica) Kimani Ffriend	Dynamic	486
3	(Serbia) Stefan Fundić	Beovuk 72	460

==== Rebounds ====
Pos	Player	Club	Total Rebounds
1	(Serbia) Stefan Fundić	Beovuk 72	307
2	(Jamaica) Kimani Ffriend	Dynamic	221
3	(Serbia) Nemanja Nenadić	Dunav	162

==== Assists ====
Pos	Player	Club	Total Assists
1	(Serbia) Aleksandar Vasić	Metalac	147
2	(Serbia) Igor Jevđenić	Beovuk 72	116
3	(Serbia) Petar Vorkapić	Sloga	107

== Super League ==
=== League table ===
Pos	Team	Pld	W	L	PF	PA	PD	Pts	Qualification or relegation
1	Crvena zvezda mts	14	13	1	1212	940	+272	27	Qualification to the Playoffs
2	Partizan NIS	14	12	2	1182	1099	+83	26	Qualification to the Playoffs
3	FMP	14	9	5	1112	995	+117	23	Qualification to the Playoffs
4	Mega Leks	14	9	5	1177	1133	+44	23	Qualification to the Playoffs
5	Dynamic	14	5	9	1096	1135	−39	19	
6	Borac	14	4	10	1027	1139	−112	18	
7	Vršac	14	3	11	1052	1162	−110	17	
8	Spartak	14	1	13	971	1226	−255	15	

Source: Basketball League of Serbia

=== Results ===
Home \ Away	BOR	CZV	DYN	FMP	MEG	PAR	SPA	VRS
Borac		65–85	91–87	71–73	75–77	73–76	84–76	75–74
Crvena zvezda mts	111–56		87–68	77–69	89–85	85–74	89–60	80–55
Dynamic	64–75	69–85		72–79	85–89	83–87	92–75	89–81
FMP	83–61	64–91	89–75		90–70	71–85	101–52	83–63
Mega Leks	84–70	67–73	75–86	83–65		79–84	93–68	93–91
Partizan NIS	93–87	78–77	76–66	82–71	98–102		100–80	86–76
Spartak	75–68	54–89	73–83	56–93	72–88	75–82		83–88
Vršac	81–76	76–94	73–77	57–81	87–92	74–81	76–72	

Legend: Blue = home team win; Red = away team win.

=== Statistical leaders ===
==== PIR ====
Pos	Player	Club	Total PIR
1	(Serbia) Marko Čakarević	Dynamic	291
2	(Serbia) Dejan Davidovac	FMP	227
3	(United States) Devin Brooks	Dynamic	219

==== Points ====
Pos	Player	Club	Total Points
1	(Montenegro) Ivan Jelenić	Spartak	225
2	(Serbia) Marko Čakarević	Dynamic	219
3	(United States) Devin Brooks	Dynamic	193

==== Rebounds ====
Pos	Player	Club	Total Rebounds
1	(France) Alpha Kaba	Mega Leks	107
2	(Serbia) Marko Čakarević	Dynamic	104
3	(Bosnia and Herzegovina) Aleksandar Todorović	Borac	89

==== Assists ====
Pos	Player	Club	Total Assists
1	(Serbia) Branislav Ratkovica	Partizan NIS	76
2	(Serbia) Filip Čović	FMP	71
3	(United States) Devin Brooks	Dynamic	68

== Playoffs ==
Semifinals; 6–9 June
Crvena zvezda mts	2
Mega Leks	0
Partizan NIS	0
FMP	2

Finals; 12–16 June
Crvena zvezda mts	3
FMP	0

2016–17 Basketball League of Serbia Champions

Crvena zvezda mts
18th title
MVP (Serbia) Ognjen Dobrić

=== Semifinals ===
Game 1

6 June 2017	Crvena zvezda mts	85–70	Mega Leks	Belgrade
21:00 (CEST)	Scoring by quarter: 21–21, 25–12, 16–17, 23–20
	Pts: Kuzmić 20; Rebs: Dangubić 9 Asts: Jović 5 PIR: Kuzmić 21	Report	Pts: Novak, Samardžiski 15; Rebs: Samardžiski 8 Asts: Novak, Samardžiski 4 PIR: Samardžiski 24	Arena: Hall Aleksandar Nikolić; Attendance: 3,247; Referees: Belošević, Obrknežević, Stefanović

7 June 2017	Partizan NIS	91–96	FMP	Belgrade
21:00 (CEST)	Scoring by quarter: 14–18, 26–19, 17–31, 34–28
	Pts: Veličković 27; Rebs: Veličković 5 Asts: Hatcher 6 PIR: Veličković 26	Report	Pts: Čović 23; Rebs: Šešlija 8 Asts: Čović 5 PIR: Čović, Bolden 22	Arena: Hall Aleksandar Nikolić; Attendance: 2,000; Referees: Vojinović, M. Juras, Nikolić

Game 2

8 June 2017	Mega Leks	75–84	Crvena zvezda mts	Sremska Mitrovica
21:00 (CEST)	Scoring by quarter: 26–28, 13–19, 27–20, 9–17
	Pts: Jaramaz 14; Rebs: Mushidi 6 Asts: Novak 11; PIR: Novak 21	Report	Pts: Thompson 15; Rebs: three players 6 Asts: Gudurić, Jović 5 PIR: Thompson 21	Arena: Sports Hall Pinki; Attendance: 1,800; Referees: Jovčić, Nešković, Jevtović

9 June 2017	FMP	78–68	Partizan NIS	Železnik
21:00 (CEST)	Scoring by quarter: 22–17, 21–16, 21–20, 14–15
	Pts: Davidovac 19; Rebs: Davidovac 12; Asts: Čović 5 PIR: Davidovac 26	Report	Pts: Hatcher 18; Rebs: Birčević 6 Asts: Ratkovica 5 PIR: Hatcher 13	Arena: Železnik Hall; Attendance: 750; Referees: Belošević, Jovčić, Glišić

=== Finals ===
Game 1

12 June 2017	Crvena zvezda mts	94–66	FMP	Belgrade
21:00 (CEST)	Scoring by quarter: 23–11, 15–13, 34–15, 22–27
	Pts: Dobrić 21; Rebs: Mitrović 6 Asts: Jenkins 6 PIR: Dobrić 22	Report	Pts: Apić 13; Rebs: Davidovac 6 Asts: Davidovac 6 PIR: Davidovac 15	Arena: Hall Aleksandar Nikolić; Attendance: 4,500; Referees: Belošević, Jovčić, Vojinović

Game 2

14 June 2017	FMP	76–91	Crvena zvezda mts	Železnik
18:30 (CEST)	Scoring by quarter: 18–30, 22–22, 14–19, 22–20
	Pts: Austin 25; Rebs: Davidovac 8 Asts: Čović 11; PIR: Austin 30	Report	Pts: Gudurić 19; Rebs: Mitrović 7 Asts: Jenkins 5 PIR: Mitrović 22	Arena: Železnik Hall; Attendance: 1,500; Referees: Nešković, Glišić, M. Juras

Game 3

16 June 2017	Crvena zvezda mts	87–57	FMP	Belgrade
20:00 (CEST)	Scoring by quarter: 30–9, 16–15, 29–18, 12–15
	Pts: Dobrić 25; Rebs: Mitrović 6 Asts: Jenkins 8 PIR: Dobrić 28	Report	Pts: Radanov, Austin 13; Rebs: Davidovac 7 Asts: Ljubičić 4 PIR: Davidovac 10	Arena: Hall Aleksandar Nikolić; Attendance: 7,103; Referees: Obrknežević, Nikolić, Jevtović

== MVP List ==
=== MVP of the Round ===
First League

Round	Player	Team	Efficiency
1	(Serbia) Stefan Fundić	Beovuk 72	37
2	(Serbia) Stefan Fundić (2)	Beovuk 72 (2)	34
2	(Serbia) Nemanja Manojlović	OKK Beograd	34
3	(Serbia) Lazar Zorčić	Dunav	52
4	(Serbia) Miloš Dimić	Vršac	36
5	(Jamaica) Kimani Ffriend	OKK Beograd (2)	38
6	(Jamaica) Kimani Ffriend (2)	OKK Beograd (3)	44
7	(Jamaica) Kimani Ffriend (3)	OKK Beograd (4)	41
8	(Serbia) Đorđe Mićić	Borac	37
9	(Jamaica) Kimani Ffriend (4)	OKK Beograd (5)	39
10	(Serbia) Miloš Janković	Metalac	41
11	(Jamaica) Kimani Ffriend (5)	OKK Beograd (6)	38
12	(Serbia) Stefan Fundić (3)	Beovuk 72 (3)	34
13	(Serbia) Nemanja Manojlović (2)	OKK Beograd (7)	36
14	(Serbia) Stefan Fundić (4)	Beovuk 72 (4)	39
15	(Serbia) Nikola Jeftić	Vršac (2)	37
15	(Serbia) Marko Jeremić	Napredak Rubin	37
16	(Serbia) Milenko Veljković	Mladost Admiral	31
17	(Serbia) Igor Kesar	Tamiš	39
18	(Serbia) Aleksandar Sokolović	Mladost Admiral (2)	30
19	(North Macedonia) Marko Dujković	Metalac (2)	46
20	(Bosnia and Herzegovina) Aleksandar Todorović	Borac (2)	39
21	(Jamaica) Kimani Ffriend (6)	Dynamic	34
22	(Serbia) Milan Marković	Napredak Rubin (2)	29
23	(Serbia) Andreja Stevanović	Dynamic (2)	36
24	(Jamaica) Kimani Ffriend (7)	Dynamic (3)	36
24	(Serbia) Filip Zekavičić	Beovuk 72 (5)	36
25	(Serbia) Đukan Đukanović	Metalac (3)	43
25	(Serbia) Brano Đukanović	Metalac (3)	43
26	(Serbia) Andreja Stevanović (2)	Dynamic (4)	44

Super League

Round	Player	Team	Efficiency
1	(Australia) Jonah Bolden	FMP	31
2	(Bosnia and Herzegovina) Aleksandar Todorović	Borac	35
3	(Serbia) Đorđe Tresač	Spartak	33
4	(Serbia) Milan Milovanović	Borac (2)	29
5	(United States) Devin Brooks	Dynamic	30
6	(United States) Devin Brooks (2)	Dynamic (2)	36
7	(Serbia) Branislav Ratkovica	Partizan NIS	27
8	(Serbia) Ognjen Dobrić	Crvena zvezda mts	22
8	(Serbia) Ognjen Jaramaz	Mega Leks	22
9	(France) Alpha Kaba	Mega Leks (2)	35
10	(Serbia) Marko Čakarević	Dynamic (3)	32
11	(Jamaica) Kimani Ffriend	Dynamic (4)	38
12	(Serbia) Jovan Novak	Mega Leks (3)	30
12	(Serbia) Sava Lešić	Mega Leks (3)	30
13	(Germany) Kostja Mushidi	Mega Leks (4)	29
14	(Serbia) Igor Kesar	Spartak (2)	28

== See also ==
- 2016–17 Radivoj Korać Cup
- 2016–17 ABA League
