= Superfund (disambiguation) =

Superfund is the common name for the Comprehensive Environmental Response, Compensation, and Liability Act of 1980 (CERCLA), a United States federal law designed to clean up sites contaminated with hazardous substances.

Superfund may also refer to:

- Superfund Group, a global managed futures fund provider
- Superannuation fund a mandatory retirement savings scheme implemented by the Australian Government, abbreviated term for industry superannuation fund
- New Zealand Superannuation Fund is a sovereign wealth fund in New Zealand and currently provides universal superannuation for people over 65 years of age
- Universities Superannuation Scheme is the UK pension fund
- FC Superfund
- KK Superfund

== See also ==
- List of Superfund sites
