= Marko Špica =

Personal information
- Born: June 9, 1986 (age 40) Novi Sad, SR Serbia, SFR Yugoslavia
- Listed height: 2.05 m (6 ft 9 in)
- Listed weight: 112 kg (247 lb)

Career information
- College: Central Michigan (2006–2010)
- NBA draft: 2010: undrafted
- Playing career: 2010–2019
- Position: Power forward
- Number: 34

Career history
- 2010: Superfund
- 2010–2011: Radnički Kragujevac
- 2011–2012: Maribor
- 2012–2013: Kaposvári KK
- 2013–2014: Antwerp Giants
- 2014–2016: Kaposvár
- 2016–2017: Soproni KC
- 2017–2019: Kaposvár

Marko Špica (Serbian Cyrillic: Марко Шпица; born June 9, 1986) is a retired Serbian professional basketball player. He is a 2.05 m tall power forward who last played for Kaposvári KK of the Hungarian League.

== Career ==
Špica grew up with juniors of Beovuk 72. In 2006, he goes to the USA to play college basketball at the Central Michigan University. In 2010, he signed with Belgrade club Superfund where he played only 8 games averaging 14.8 points and 6.6 rebounds per game in Basketball League of Serbia. After good games in the middle of the season he signed with Radnički Kragujevac where he stayed till the end of the season. In 2011, he goes to Slovenian club Maribor. He averaged 9.6 points and 4.2 rebounds per game in Slovenian League. In 2012 Špica signed with Hungarian club Kaposvári KK. In June 2013, he signed a one-year deal with the Belgian club Antwerp Giants. In October 2014, he returned to his former team Kaposvári KK. After one-year stint with Soproni KC Špica returned to Kaposvár and signed a two-year contract in May 2017.

In April 2019, Spica announced that he would retire from professional basketball after suffering a back injury in March 2019 during a game against PVSK. He played 161 official games with Kaposvári KK in five season, scoring 2442 total points.
