= Zhao Xuxin =

Chinese basketball player

Zhao Xuxin 赵旭昕
Personal information
- Born: January 15, 1999 (age 27) Jiangsu, China
- Listed height: 2.09 m (6 ft 10 in)
- Listed weight: 105 kg (231 lb)

Career information
- Playing career: 2017–present
- Position: Power forward

Career history
- 2017–2018: Mladost Admiral
- 2018–2019: Beovuk 72
- 2019–2025: Jiangsu Dragons

Zhao Xuxin (born January 15, 1999) is a Chinese professional basketball player.

== Playing career ==
Zhao played for youth team Vizura Shark (2016–17). In 2017, he joined Mladost Admiral of the Basketball League of Serbia. In 2018, he joined Beovuk 72 for the 2018–19 BLS season.

In 2019, he joined Jiangsu Dragons of the Chinese Basketball Association (CBA).

== See also ==
- List of foreign basketball players in Serbia
