= Srđan Flajs =

Serbian basketball coach

Personal information
- Born: July 12, 1975 (age 51) Belgrade, SR Serbia, SFR Yugoslavia
- Coaching career: 1993–present

Career history

Coaching
- 1993–2002: Beovuk 72 (youth)
- 2000–2003: Beovuk 72
- 2003–2006: Atlas (assistant)
- 2005: Atlas (interim)
- 2006–2007: Vojvodina Srbijagas (assistant)
- 2008–2010: Superfund
- 2010–2011: Crvena zvezda (assistant)
- 2011–2012: Lietuvos rytas (assistant)
- 2013–2017: Mega Leks (assistant)
- 2017–2018: Budućnost (assistant)
- 2019–2021: Lietkabelis Panevėžys (assistant)
- 2021–2022: Budućnost (assistant)
- 2023–2024: Metalac Valjevo

Career highlights
- Montenegrin League champion (2022); Serbian B League champion (2010)

Srđan Flajs (Serbian Cyrillic: Срђан Флајс; born 12 July 1975) is a Serbian basketball coach who was most recently the head coach for Metalac Valjevo of the Serbian League (KLS).

== Coaching career ==
Flajs had started his coaching career with Beovuk 72 where he coached youth system, as well as the senior team. In 2003, he joined the Atlas coaching stuff. During 2006–07 season he was an assistant coach for Vojvodina Srbijagas.

Flajs was a head coach for Superfund for two seasons. In his second season he managed to won the Serbian B League championship. Later, he was a part of a coaching stuff for Crvena zvezda, Lietuvos rytas (Lithuania) and Mega Leks.

In June 2017, Flajs joined Budućnost VOLI coaching staff after Serbian coach Aleksandar Džikić become their head coach for the 2017–18 season. In January 2021, he was named an assistant coach of Budućnost under Dejan Milojević.

In July 2022, Flajs joined Hapoel Jerusalem coaching staff, once again as an assistant coach under Džikić, but in September reached an agreement with the team for terminating his contract for personal reasons.

== National team career ==
Flajs coached Libya national under-19 basketball team for the 2007–08 season. Also, he was an assistant coach of the Serbia men's national under-20 basketball team for two years, in 2011 and 2012.

== Career achievements and awards ==
Head coach

- Serbian B League champion: 1 (with Superfund: 2009–10)

Assistant coach

- Adriatic League champion: 1 (with Budućnost VOLI: 2017–18)
- Montenegrin League champion: 1 (with Budućnost VOLI: 2020–21)
- Montenegrin Cup winner: 2 (with Budućnost VOLI: 2017–18, 2020–21)
- Serbian Cup winner: 1 (with Mega Leks: 2015–16)
