= Ognjen Dobrić =

Serbian basketball player (born 1994)

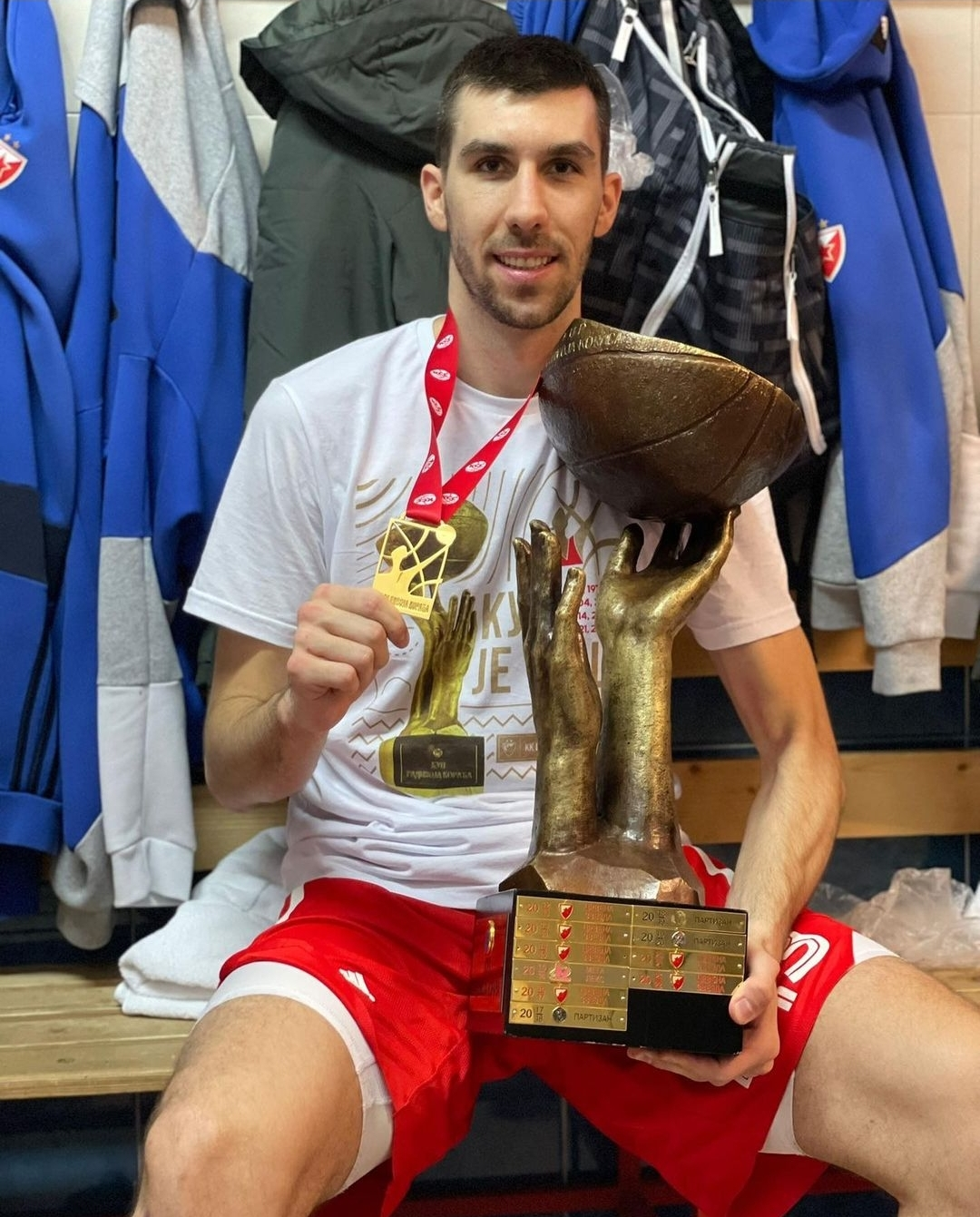
- Dobrić holding the National Cup trophy in 2022

No. 13 – Crvena zvezda
- Position: Small forward / shooting guard
- League: KLS; ABA League; EuroLeague

Personal information
- Born: 27 October 1994 (age 32) Knin, Croatia
- Listed height: 6 ft 7 in (2.01 m)
- Listed weight: 205 lb (93 kg)

Career information
- NBA draft: 2016: undrafted
- Playing career: 2013–present

Career history
- 2013–2023: Crvena zvezda
- 2013–2016: →FMP
- 2023–2024: Virtus Bologna
- 2024–present: Crvena zvezda

Career highlights
- 4× ABA League champion (2017, 2019, 2021, 2022); Italian Supercup winner (2023); 6× Serbian League champion (2017–2019, 2021–2023); 2× Serbian League Playoffs MVP (2017, 2021); 5× Serbian Cup winner (2017, 2021–2023, 2025); Adriatic League Finals MVP (2022); Serbian Cup MVP (2023); Adriatic Supercup winner (2018)
Medals
Men's basketball
Representing Serbia
Olympic Games
Bronze medal – third place	2024 Paris	Team
FIBA World Cup
Silver medal – second place	2023 Philippines–Japan–Indonesia
U19 World Championship
Silver medal – second place	2013 Czech Republic	Team
U20 European Championship
Bronze medal – third place	2014 Greece	Team

Ognjen Dobrić (born 27 October 1994) is a Serbian professional basketball player for Crvena zvezda of the Basketball League of Serbia (KLS), the ABA League, and the EuroLeague.

== Career ==
=== Crvena zvezda (2013–2023) ===
Ognjen grew up with Crvena zvezda youth teams and signed his first professional contract in December 2012.

Dobrić signed a four-year deal with KK Crvena zvezda on 21 September 2016, after previously playing on loan for FMP for three seasons. He scored his ABA League high score of 17 points against KK Olimpija Ljubljana, and his Euroleague high of 17 points in loss to Baskonia Vitoria Gasteiz. On 6 July 2019, Dobrić signed a two-year contract extension for the Zvezda. He averaged 5.1 points per game. On 8 September 2020, Dobrić signed a two-year contract extension with the Zvezda. On 12 December 2020, Dobrić recorded his 250 apperiences for the Zvezda. He re-signed with the team on 6 July 2021.

During the 2022–2023 campaign, in 31 EuroLeague games (19 starts), he averaged 9.9 points, 2.5 rebounds and 1.6 assists, playing around 24 minutes per contest.

=== Virtus Bologna (2023–2024) ===
On 13 July 2023, Dobrić signed a two-year deal with Virtus Bologna, of the Italian Lega Basket Serie A (LBA) and the EuroLeague. On 24 September 2023, after having ousted Olimpia Milano in the semifinals, Virtus won its fourth Supercup, and the third in a row, defeating 97–60 Germani Brescia.

=== Return to Crvena zvezda ===
On 19 July 2024, Dobrić returned to his former club, Crvena zvezda.

== National team career ==
He won the bronze medal at the 2024 Summer Olympics with Serbia. Over 6 tournament games, Dobrić averaged 7.7 points and 1.5 rebounds.

== Career statistics ==
Legend
GP	Games played	GS	Games started	MPG	Minutes per game
FG%	Field-goal percentage	3P%	3-point field-goal percentage	FT%	Free-throw percentage
RPG	Rebounds per game	APG	Assists per game	SPG	Steals per game
BPG	Blocks per game	PPG	Points per game	PIR	Performance index rating
**Bold**	Career high

=== Euroleague ===
Year	Team	GP	GS	MPG	FG%	3P%	FT%	RPG	APG	SPG	BPG	PPG	PIR
2016–17	Crvena zvezda	13	0	5.2	.409	.167	.333	.5	.2	.3	—	1.6	0.6
2017–18	Crvena zvezda	26	1	15.2	.452	.351	.826	2.3	.4	.6	**.2**	6.5	6.1
2019–20	Crvena zvezda	22	3	14.6	.467	.357	.684	1.7	.9	.8	**.2**	5.1	5.3
2020–21	Crvena zvezda	**32**	7	18.6	.431	**.456**	**.857**	2.0	.8	**.9**	.0	8.3	7.0
2021–22	Crvena zvezda	29	13	22.6	.408	.357	.745	1.9	1.3	.7	.1	10.3	7.3
2022–23	Crvena zvezda	31	**19**	**23.7**	.440	.324	.743	**2.5**	**1.6**	.5	—	9.9	**8.1**
2023–24	Bologna	28	6	13.4	**.524**	.408	.667	1.6	.6	.5	—	7.6	4.4
Career		181	49	17.4	.442	.369	.769	1.9	.9	.6	.1	7.2	6.0

== See also ==
- List of KK Crvena zvezda players with 100 games played

== Notes ==
1. At the time of his birth, Knin was part of the self-proclaimed Republic of Serbian Krajina.
