= Stefan Fundić =

Serbian basketball player

No. 13 – Kumanovo
- Position: Power forward
- League: Macedonian First League

Personal information
- Born: 30 June 1994 (age 32) Belgrade, Serbia, FR Yugoslavia
- Listed height: 2.00 m (6 ft 7 in)
- Listed weight: 105 kg (231 lb)

Career information
- NBA draft: 2016: undrafted
- Playing career: 2014–present

Career history
- 2014–2017: Beovuk 72
- 2017: Vršac
- 2017–2019: Mega Bemax
- 2019–2020: Zadar
- 2020–2022: Igokea
- 2022–2024: Giessen 46ers
- 2024–2025: Mladost Zemun
- 2025–2026: Borac Čačak
- 2026–present: Kumanovo

Career highlights
- Bosnian League champion (2022); 2× Bosnian Cup winner (2021, 2022); Croatian Cup winner (2020)

Stefan Fundić (Serbian Cyrillic: Стефан Фундић; born 30 June 1994) is a Serbian professional basketball player for Kumanovo of the Macedonian First League. Standing at 2.00 m (6' 7"), he plays as a power forward.

== Playing career ==
Fundić played for the Beovuk 72 of the Basketball League of Serbia (First League) for three seasons, from 2014 to 2017. In 2016–17 season, he was selected as MVP of the Round for four times. Also, he averaged 17.7 points, 11.8 rebounds per game. On 14 April 2017, Fundić signed for Vršac. He played for Vršac at 2017 Serbian SuperLeague season.

On 12 July 2017, Fundić sign for Mega Bemax of the Adriatic League. He left Mega in August 2019.

On 11 September 2019, he signed with Zadar of the Croatian League and the ABA League.

In June 2020, Fundić signed a two-year contract for a Bosnian team Igokea.

On August 17, 2022, he signed with Giessen 46ers of the German ProA.
