= Kimani Ffriend =

Jamaican basketball player

Personal information
- Born: 29 July 1977 (age 49) Kingston, Jamaica
- Listed height: 6 ft 11 in (2.11 m)
- Listed weight: 220 lb (100 kg)

Career information
- College: DeKalb (1997–1998); Gulf Coast CC (1998–1999); Nebraska (1999–2001)
- NBA draft: 2001: undrafted
- Playing career: 2001–2017
- Position: Center

Career history
- 2001–2002: Greenville Groove
- 2002: Trotamundos de Carabobo
- 2002: Dynamo Moscow
- 2002–2003: Beijing Shougang Ducks
- 2003: Gigantes de Carolina
- 2003–2004: Reflex
- 2004–2005: Hapoel Jerusalem
- 2005: Varese
- 2005–2006: Beşiktaş
- 2006–2007: Incheon ET Land Black Slamer
- 2007–2008: Brose Baskets
- 2008: Paris-Levallois
- 2008–2009: Mersin
- 2009–2010: Apollon Limassol
- 2010: Panteras de Miranda
- 2010: Cangrejeros de Cartagena
- 2010–2011: Bornova Belediye
- 2011–2012: Hamyari Shahrdari Zanjan
- 2012: Fuenlabrada
- 2012: Metalac
- 2015–2016: Jagodina
- 2016: OKK Beograd
- 2017: Dynamic
- 2017: Ciclista Olímpico

Career highlights
- NBDL champion (2002); Adriatic League champion (2004); Serbian First League MVP (2017)

Kimani Ffriend (born 29 July 1977) is a Jamaican former professional basketball player. He played at the center position.

== College career ==
Ffriend played NCAA college basketball with the Nebraska Cornhuskers from 1999 to 2001. Prior that, Ffriend attended Gulf Coast Community College and DeKalb College.

== Professional career ==
Ffriend started his professional career with the Greenville Groove of the National Basketball Development League (NBDL) in the 2001–02 season.

== Jamaica national team ==
Ffriend won the gold medal at the 2009 FIBA CBC Championship with the Jamaica national team.

== Off the court ==
In the early morning hours of Saturday, 3 November 2012, Kimani Ffriend hit a 29-year-old woman with his car in downtown Belgrade at the intersection of Francuska Street and Cara Dušana Street, killing her instantly. According to the reports, the basketball player was driving under the influence, with 0.98‰ of alcohol in his blood as determined via a breathalyzer test administered by the police. Twenty-nine-year-old victim Nevena Dragutinović was with her twin sister when she was struck by Ffriend with his Škoda Fabia and killed. Her sister was taken to the emergency center in a state of shock. The accident happened around 4:20 a.m. CET. Ffriend told the police that he had tried to avoid a taxi that was in the right lane, that he had therefore swerved into the left lane and hit the victim. Ffriend left the Valjevo-based Metalac basketball club on the same day earlier, as he was supposed to transfer to Spanish CB Valladolid.

On 5 November 2012, an investigative judge from the Higher Court in Belgrade ordered Ffriend detained for 30 days due to a "possibility of the suspect fleeing the country".

On 5 September 2014, the Belgrade Higher Court found Ffriend guilty of committing a "severe act against public traffic safety" and sentenced him to 3 years in prison along with a 2-year ban on operating motorized vehicles.

== See also ==
- List of foreign basketball players in Serbia
