= KK Beovuk 72 =

Basketball club in Belgrade, Serbia

Beovuk 72
- Leagues: Second League of Serbia
- Founded: 1972; 54 years ago
- History: KK Tašmajdan (1972–1994); KK Beovuk (1994–2003); KK Beovuk 72 (2003–present)
- Arena: SC Šumice
- Capacity: 1.200
- Location: Belgrade, Serbia
- Team colors: Yellow, Black
- President: Marina Lakić
- General manager: Rajko Mirković
- Head coach: Nikola Paunović
- Website: kkbeovuk72.rs
Home	Away

Kosarkaški klub Beovuk 72 (Serbian Cyrillic: Кошаркашки клуб Беовук 72), commonly referred to as KK Beovuk 72, is basketball club based in Belgrade, Serbia. The team is currently competing in the Second Basketball League of Serbia.

== Coaches ==
- (Federal Republic of Yugoslavia) Ivan Jeremić (1990–1992)
- (Federal Republic of Yugoslavia) Aleksandar Petrović
- (Federal Republic of Yugoslavia) Milan Lakić (1994–1995)
- (Federal Republic of Yugoslavia) Mile Protić (1996–1997)
- (Federal Republic of Yugoslavia) Aleksandar Džikić (1997–1999)
- (Serbia and Montenegro) Srđan Flajs (2000–2003)
- (Serbia) Milenko Bogićević (2004–2007)
- (Serbia) Dušan Milojević (2007–2009)
- (Serbia) Nebojša Andrić (2009–2011)
- (Serbia) Nikola Stanić (2011–2014)
- (Serbia) Rajko Mirkovic (2014–2017)
- (Serbia) Slobodan Srezoski (2018)
- (Serbia) Rajko Mirković (2018–2019)
- (Serbia) Nikola Stanić (2019–2021)
- (Serbia) Rajko Mirković (2021–2022)
- (Serbia) Nikola Paunović (2022-2025)

== Notable players ==
- (Serbia) Dejan Milojević
- (Serbia) Ognjen Aškrabić
- (Serbia) Predrag Savović
- (Serbia) Boban Savović
- (Serbia) Aleksandar Glintić
- (Serbia) Vladimir Štimac
- (Serbia) Nenad Šulović
- (Serbia) Marko Špica
- (Serbia) Nikola Marković
- (Serbia) Stefan Fundić
- (Serbia) Ljubo Popović
- (China) Zhao Xuxin
