= CS Otopeni (basketball) =

- Founded: 2001
- Dissolved: 2012
- Arena: Sala Otopeni
- Location: Otopeni, Romania
- Team colors: Blue, White
Home	Away

CS Otopeni was a Romanian professional basketball club, based in Otopeni, Romania. In 2006, the team promoted for the first time ever in the first division. The previous season (2008–09) was the most successful in the club's history, CS Otopeni finishing 6th in the regular season, qualifying for the playoffs semifinals, and playing the Romanian Cup final.

On 4 January 2012 CS Otopeni withdrew from the Liga Națională and was dissolved, due to financial problems.
