= Dejan Davidovac =

Serbian basketball player (born 1995)

Dejan Davidovac Дејан Давидовац
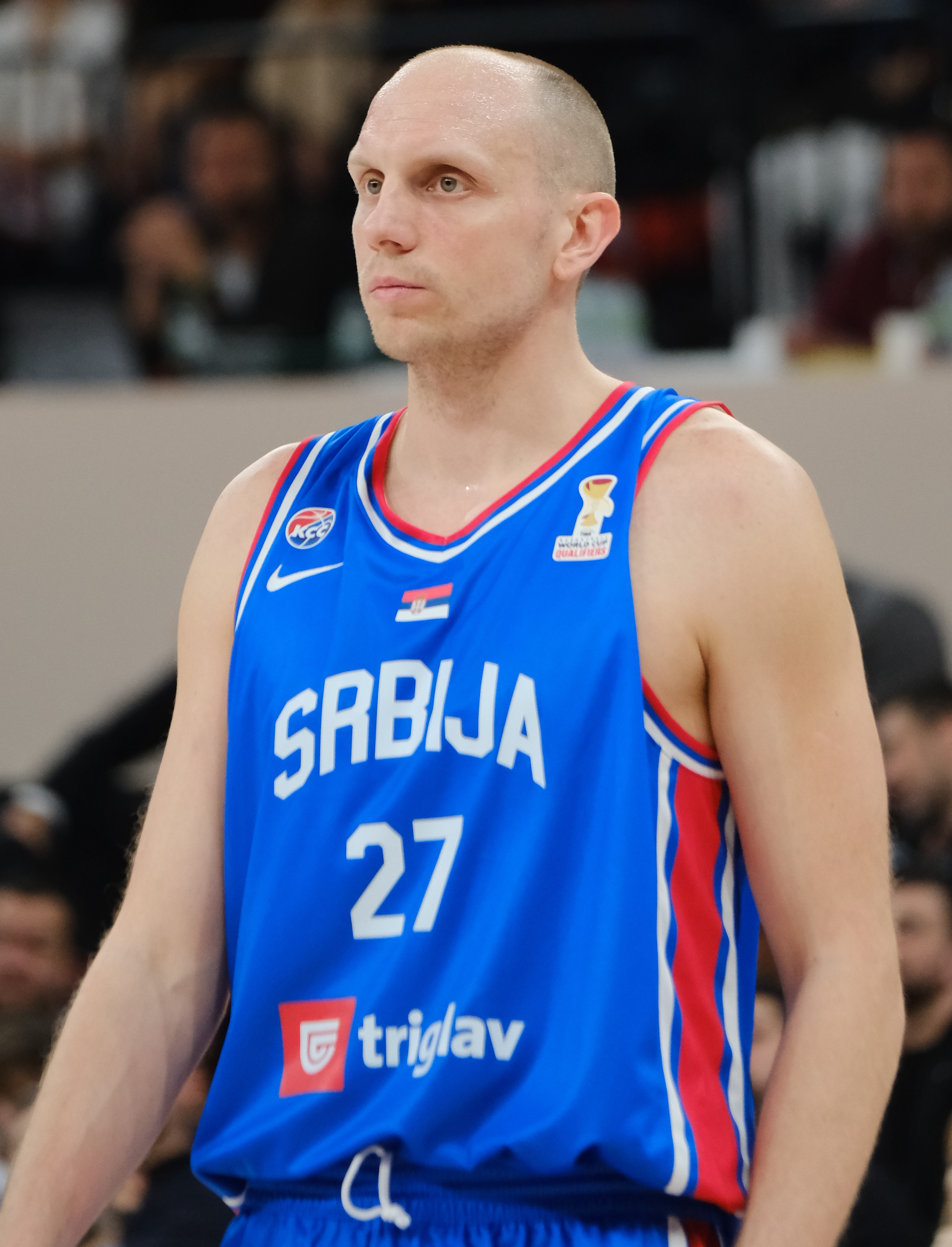
- Davidovac with Serbia national team in 2026

No. 7 – Crvena zvezda
- Position: Power forward / center
- League: KLS; ABA League; EuroLeague

Personal information
- Born: 17 January 1995 (age 31) Zrenjanin, Serbia, FR Yugoslavia
- Listed height: 6 ft 9 in (2.06 m)
- Listed weight: 209 lb (95 kg)

Career information
- NBA draft: 2017: undrafted
- Playing career: 2011–present

Career history
- 2011–2012: Proleter Naftagas
- 2012–2015: Vršac Swisslion
- 2015–2022: Crvena zvezda
- 2015–2017: →FMP
- 2022–2023: CSKA Moscow
- 2023–present: Crvena zvezda

Career highlights
- Serbian League Finals MVP (2024); 4× Adriatic League champion (2019, 2021, 2022, 2024); 5× Serbian League champion (2018, 2019, 2021, 2022, 2024); Adriatic Supercup winner (2018); 4× Serbian Cup winner (2021, 2022, 2024, 2025, 2026)
Medals
Men's basketball
Representing Serbia
Olympic Games
Bronze medal – third place	2024 Paris	Team
FIBA World Cup
Silver medal – second place	2023 Philippines–Japan–Indonesia
U20 European Championship
Gold medal – first place	2015 Italy	Team

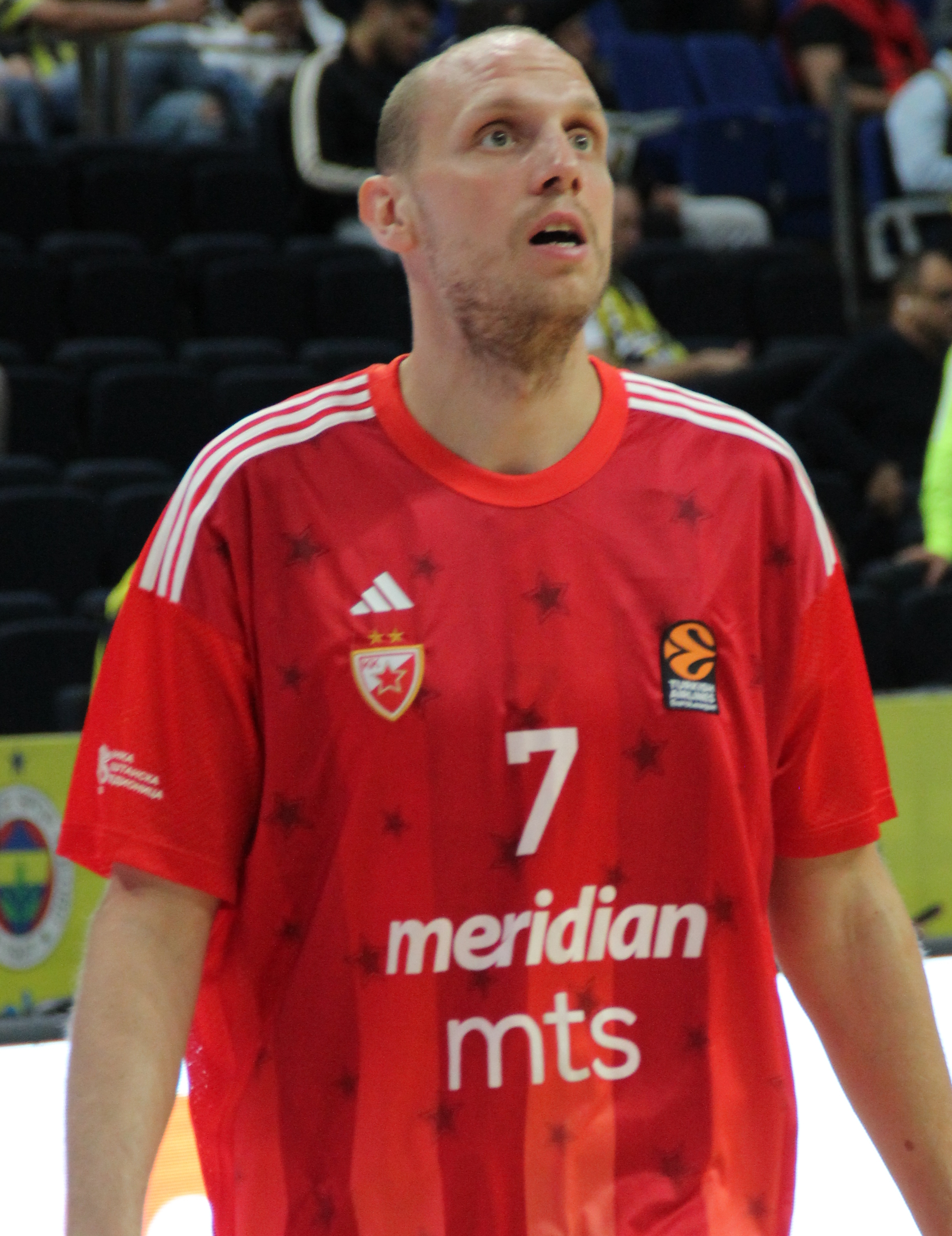
Davidovac with Crvena zvezda in 2024

Dejan Davidovac (Serbian Cyrillic: Дејан Давидовац; born 17 January 1995) is a Serbian professional basketball player for Crvena zvezda of the Serbian KLS, the ABA League and the EuroLeague. Standing at 2.06 m (6 ft 9 in), he mostly plays at the power forward and center positions.

== Playing career ==
Davidovac started to play basketball in the youth ranks of his hometown's Proleter Naftagas. In the 2011–12 season, he played his first Serbian League season. In 2012, Davidovac signed for Vršac Swisslion.

Davidovac signed for Crvena zvezda and was immediately loaned to FMP in March 2015, just before the start of the Serbian Super League season. On 30 September 2016, Davidovac made his Adriatic League debut for FMP in a 78–76 loss to KK Zadar, making 7 points, 7 rebounds and 3 assists. On 11 February 2017, Davidovac scored an Adriatic career-high 28 points to help defeat Union Olimpija. Through 26 Adriatic League games in the 2016–17 season, Davidovac averaged 10.0 points, 5.1 rebounds, and 2.5 assists per game.

On 13 September 2017, Davidovac signed a four-year contract with the Crvena zvezda. On 22 October 2017, Davidovac made his debut for Crvena zvezda in the Adriatic League against Cedevita, making his 3 points, 3 rebounds and 2 assists in 9 minutes of playing time. Two days later, on 24 October, Davidovac made his EuroLeague debut against Russian team Khimki, making two 2-point attempts and a rebound in under 6 minutes of playing time. Through 23 games in the 2017–18 Adriatic season, he averaged 5.6 points, 3.1 rebounds, and 1.9 assists per game. In 24 EuroLeague games, he recorded 6.5 points, 2.0 rebounds, and 1.2 assists per game. Through 17 games in the 2018 Serbian SuperLeague season, Davidovac averaged 7.9 points, 3.9 rebounds, 1.6 assists, and 1.4 steals per game. He won Serbian SuperLeague in the 2017–18 season. Davidovac averaged 6.2 points and 2.9 rebounds per game during the 2019–20 ABA season. On 8 September 2020, Davidovac signed a two-year contract extension with the Zvezda.

On 26 June 2022, Davidovac signed for CSKA Moscow.

== National team career ==
Davidovac was a member of the Serbian under-18 team that competed at the 2013 FIBA Europe Under-18 Championship in Latvia. Over nine tournament games, he averaged 7.2 points, 5.0 rebounds and 1.1 assists per game. Davidovac was a member of the Serbian under-20 team that won the gold medal at the 2015 FIBA Europe Under-20 Championship in Lignano Sabbiadoro and Latisana, Italy. Over ten tournament games, he averaged 8.7 points, 4.7 rebounds and 1.1 assists per game. He won the bronze medal at the 2024 Summer Olympics with Serbia.

== Career statistics ==
Legend
GP	Games played	GS	Games started	MPG	Minutes per game
FG%	Field-goal percentage	3P%	3-point field-goal percentage	FT%	Free-throw percentage
RPG	Rebounds per game	APG	Assists per game	SPG	Steals per game
BPG	Blocks per game	PPG	Points per game	PIR	Performance index rating
**Bold**	Career high

=== Euroleague ===
Year	Team	GP	GS	MPG	FG%	3P%	FT%	RPG	APG	SPG	BPG	PPG	PIR
2017–18	Crvena zvezda	24	6	15.6	**.543**	**.468**	.773	2.0	1.2	.7	**.3**	6.5	7.4
2019–20	Crvena zvezda	24	4	18.8	.450	.326	**.795**	2.9	.6	.8	**.3**	6.2	7.3
2020–21	Crvena zvezda	**33**	8	**22.6**	.489	.378	.780	2.8	**1.6**	**1.0**	.2	**7.2**	**8.3**
2021–22	Crvena zvezda	28	**13**	18.6	.443	.352	.700	**3.3**	.9	.8	**.3**	5.0	7.3
2023–24	Crvena zvezda	31	12	19.3	.463	.382	.739	3.0	.6	.7	**.3**	5.1	6.5
Career		140	43	19.2	.477	.381	.760	2.8	1.0	.8	.3	6.0	7.4

=== EuroCup ===
Year	Team	GP	GS	MPG	FG%	3P%	FT%	RPG	APG	SPG	BPG	PPG	PIR
2018–19	Crvena zvezda	8	0	10.9	.500	.222	.538	.9	1.5	—	—	3.9	3.6
Career		8	0	10.9	.500	.222	.538	.9	1.5	—	—	3.9	3.6

=== Domestic leagues ===
Year	Team	League	GP	MPG	FG%	3P%	FT%	RPG	APG	SPG	BPG	PPG
2011–12	(Serbia) Proleter Zrenjanin	KLS	5	3.6	.000	—	—	.6	—	.2	—	0.0
2013–14	(Serbia) Vršac	KLS	17	8.2	.565	.333	.818	1.2	.7	.2	.2	2.2
2014–15	(Serbia) Vršac	KLS	22	26.8	.443	.339	.756	5.1	2.5	2.0	.9	9.9
2014–15	(Serbia) FMP	KLS	14	29.6	.417	.317	.760	6.2	2.0	1.5	.6	10.5
2015–16	(Serbia) FMP	KLS	37	25.6	.418	.358	.750	5.6	2.9	1.6	.3	10.1
2016–17	(Serbia) FMP	KLS	19	26.0	.420	.275	.714	6.2	3.5	1.6	.2	10.8
2016–17	(Serbia) FMP	ABA	26	26.7	.404	.279	.692	5.1	2.5	1.2	1.0	10.0
2017–18	(Serbia) Crvena zvezda	KLS	17	23.2	.462	.300	.623	3.9	1.6	1.3	.3	7.9
2017–18	(Serbia) Crvena zvezda	ABA	23	16.7	.440	.333	.771	3.0	1.9	.8	.3	5.6
2018–19	(Serbia) Crvena zvezda	KLS	16	20.9	.438	.403	.694	3.0	2.2	1.1	.4	9.5
2018–19	(Serbia) Crvena zvezda	ABA	22	16.8	.427	.294	.725	3.5	1.8	.9	.4	5.7
2019–20	(Serbia) Crvena zvezda	ABA	17	16.9	.433	.358	.767	2.6	1.0	.9	.3	7.6
2020–21	(Serbia) Crvena zvezda	KLS	7	22.9	.432	.370	.875	4.9	2.4	1.7	.9	8.9
2020–21	(Serbia) Crvena zvezda	ABA	31	23.7	.472	.386	.864	4.1	1.4	.9	.3	8.7
2021–22	(Serbia) Crvena zvezda	KLS	5	12.1	.385	.000	—	1.6	1.4	.4	.4	2.0
2021–22	(Serbia) Crvena zvezda	ABA	30	17.4	.466	.337	.854	3.2	.9	.9	.2	6.9
2022–23	(Russia) CSKA Moscow	VTBUL	47	20.1	.553	.455	.875	3.6	1.0	.9	.3	7.1
2023–24	(Serbia) Crvena zvezda	KLS	3	23.7	.579	.500	.900	5.3	1.7	1.7	.7	11.3
2023–24	(Serbia) Crvena zvezda	ABA	31	18.5	.550	.407	.855	3.6	1.4	.8	.2	6.5

== See also ==
- List of KK Crvena zvezda players with 100 games played
