= KK Superfund =

Defunct basketball club in Belgrade, Serbia

Superfund BP
- Founded: 2002; 23 years ago
- Folded: 2011; 14 years ago
- History: KK Superfund (2002–2011)
- Arena: New Belgrade Sports Hall
- Location: Belgrade, Serbia
- Team colors: Green, White
Home	Away

Košarkaški klub Superfund BasketPlus (Serbian Cyrillic: Кошаркашки клуб Суперфунд), commonly referred to as Superfund BP, was a men's professional basketball club from Belgrade, Serbia. The club competed in the Basketball League of Serbia during the 2010–11 season.

== Coaches ==
- (Serbia) Vuk Stanimirović
- (Serbia) Srđan Flajs (2008–2010)
- (Serbia) Aleksandar Matović

== Trophies and awards ==
=== Trophies ===
- Second League of Serbia (2nd-tier)
  - Winner (1): 2009–10
