= Jovan Novak =

Serbian basketball player (born 1994)

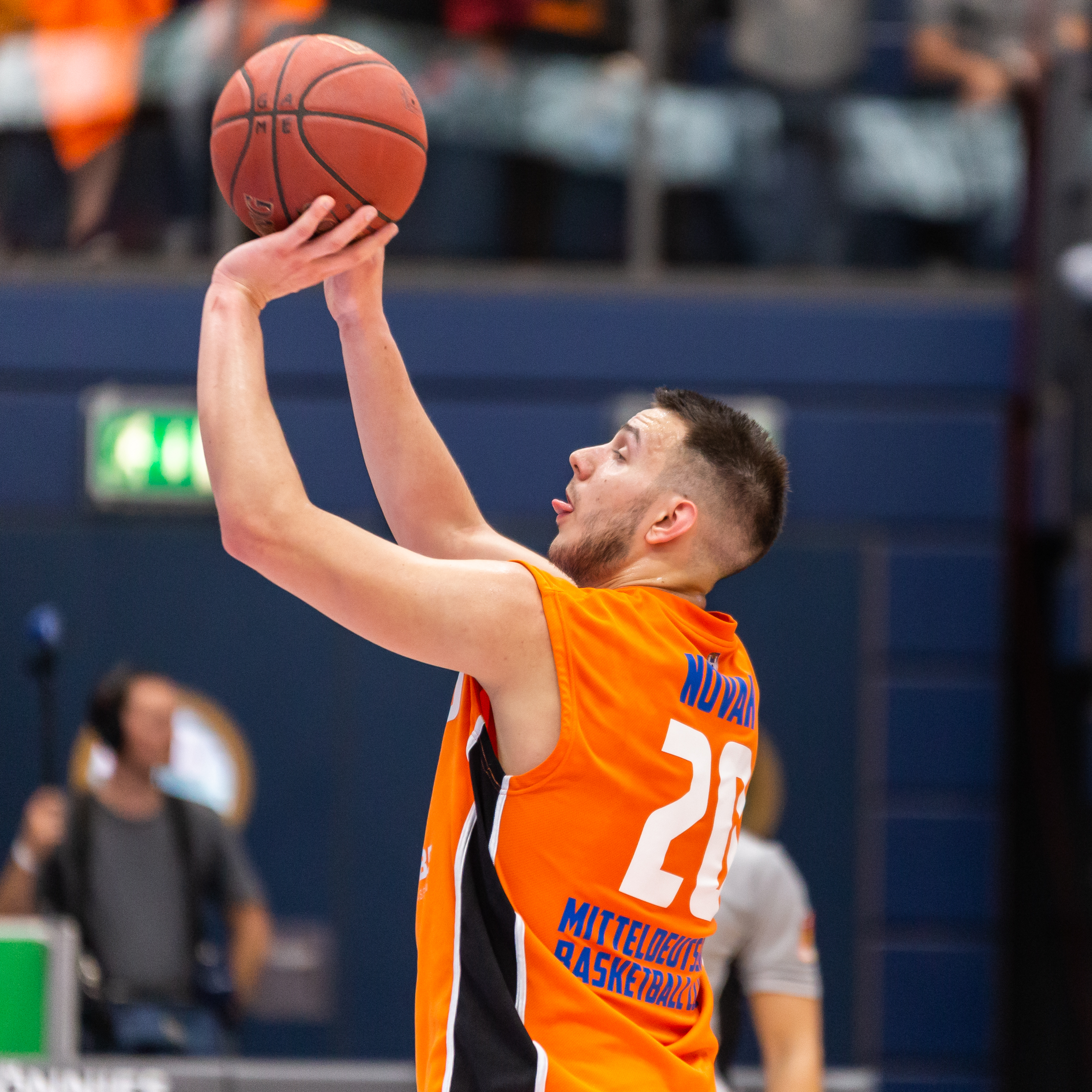
- Novak in action with Mitteldeutscher BC.

Free Agent
- Position: Point guard / shooting guard

Personal information
- Born: November 8, 1994 (age 32) Vršac, Serbia, FR Yugoslavia
- Listed height: 6 ft 2 in (1.88 m)
- Listed weight: 187 lb (85 kg)

Career information
- NBA draft: 2016: undrafted
- Playing career: 2012–present

Career history
- 2012–2014: Vršac
- 2014: →Radnički
- 2014–2015: Vojvodina Srbijagas
- 2015–2016: Turów Zgorzelec
- 2016: Metalac
- 2016–2017: Mega Basket
- 2017: Dąbrowa Górnicza
- 2018–2020: Mitteldeutscher
- 2020–2021: Mega Basket
- 2021: → Fuenlabrada
- 2021–2023: Fuenlabrada
- 2023: Shenzhen Leopards
- 2024: KK FMP
- 2024–2026: Wilki Morskie Szczecin

Career highlights
- All-PLK Team (2025); 2× PLK assists leader (2025, 2026)
Medals
Men's basketball
Representing Serbia
U20 European Championship
Bronze medal – third place	2014 Greece	Team
U19 World Championship
Silver medal – second place	2013 Czech Republic	Team

Jovan Novak (born November 8, 1994) is a Serbian professional basketball player who last played for Wilki Morskie Szczecin of the Polish Basketball League (PLK).

== Professional career ==
Novak made his senior debut with Vršac in Serbia. On April 2, 2014, he was loaned to Radnički Kragujevac for the rest of the 2013–14 season. In September 2014, he parted ways with Vršac.

On November 17, 2014, he signed a contract with Vojvodina Srbijagas for the 2014–15 season.

On July 31, 2015, Novak signed with the Polish club Turów Zgorzelec for the 2015–16 season. After the end of the Polish regular season, in late April 2016, he signed with Metalac Valjevo for the rest of the season.

On October 7, 2016, Novak signed with Mega Leks for the 2016–17 season. On November 21, 2017, Novak signed with Polish club MKS Dąbrowa Górnicza.

On October 30, 2020, Novak signed for Mega Soccerbet of the Basketball League of Serbia and the ABA League.

On December 31, 2024, he signed with Wilki Morskie Szczecin of the Polish Basketball League (PLK).

== Serbian national team ==
Novak was a member of the Serbian U19 national team that won the silver medal at the 2013 FIBA Under-19 World Championship in the Czech Republic.
