= Aleksandar Todorović =

Personal information
- Born: June 10, 1987 (age 39) Loznica, SFR Yugoslavia
- Listed height: 6 ft 9 in (2.06 m)
- Listed weight: 104 kg (229 lb)

Career information
- NBA draft: 2009: undrafted
- Playing career: 2007–present
- Position: Power forward

Career history
- 2007–2008: Bijeljina
- 2008–2011: Bratunac
- 2011–2014: Šabac
- 2014–2015: Sloga Kraljevo
- 2015–2016: Beroe
- 2016–2017: Borac Čačak
- 2017: Gostivar
- 2018: Dynamic Belgrade
- 2018–2019: Zrinjski
- 2019–2020: Novi Pazar
- 2020–2022: Gostivar
- 2022–2023: BC Beroe
- 2023–2024: Loznica

Aleksandar Todorović (Serbian Cyrillic: Александар Тодоровић; born June 10, 1987) is a Serbian professional basketball.

== Professional career ==
On August 14, 2017, Todorović signed with Macedonian basketball club Gostivar. On January 3, 2018, Todorović signed with Dynamic Belgrade. On July 14, 2018, he signed for Zrinjski Mostar.

In July 2019, Todorović signed for Novi Pazar.
