= 2021–22 KK Partizan season =

Serbian basketball team season

Partizan NIS Belgrade
2021–22 season
- President: (Serbia) Ostoja Mijailović
- Head coach: (Serbia) Željko Obradović
- Arena: Aleksandar Nikolić Hall (8,000); Štark Arena (18,386)
- Serbian League: Withdrew
- ABA League: 2nd
- EuroCup: Eightfinals
- Serbian Cup: Runner-up
- Highest home attendance: 19,224 vs (Turkey) Frutti Extra Bursaspor (20 April 2022)
- Biggest win: 109–49 vs (Croatia) Split (05 January 2022)
- Biggest defeat: 62–89 vs (Turkey) Fenerbahçe (12 September 2021)
Home	Away
- All statistics correct as of 9 June 2022.

In the 2021–22 season, Partizan NIS Belgrade competed in the Serbian League, Radivoj Korać Cup, Adriatic League and EuroCup.

== Players ==
=== Current roster ===
Note: Flags indicate national team eligibility at FIBA-sanctioned events. Players may hold other non-FIBA nationalities not displayed.

Partizan NIS Belgrade roster
Players
Coaches

Pos.	No.	Nat.	Name	Ht.		Age
SG	0	(Serbia)	Punter, Kevin	1.93 m (6 ft 4 in)	81 kg (179 lb)	33 – 25 June 1993
PF	1	(Serbia)	Vukčević, Tristan	2.09 m (6 ft 10 in)	100 kg (220 lb)	23 – 11 March 2003
PF	2	(United States)	LeDay, Zach	2.02 m (6 ft 8 in)	103 kg (227 lb)	32 – 30 May 1994
SF	3	(Serbia)	Zagorac, Rade (C)	2.06 m (6 ft 9 in)	92 kg (203 lb)	31 – 12 August 1995
G	4	(Serbia)	Avramović, Aleksa	1.92 m (6 ft 4 in)	87 kg (192 lb)	32 – 25 October 1994
C	5	(Serbia)	Koprivica, Balša	2.16 m (7 ft 1 in)	109 kg (240 lb)	26 – 1 May 2000
F	6	(Serbia)	Dangubić, Nemanja	2.04 m (6 ft 8 in)	88 kg (194 lb)	33 – 13 April 1993
PF	9	(Serbia)	Smailagić, Alen	2.08 m (6 ft 10 in)	98 kg (216 lb)	26 – 18 August 2000
SF	00	(Latvia)	Kurucs, Rodions	2.06 m (6 ft 9 in)	103 kg (227 lb)	28 – 5 February 1998
C	11	(Serbia)	Miletić, Dušan	2.13 m (7 ft 0 in)	98 kg (216 lb)	28 – 30 July 1998
SG	14	(Albania)	Moore, Dallas	1.85 m (6 ft 1 in)	82 kg (181 lb)	32 – 27 October 1994
SG	24	(Slovenia)	Glas, Gregor	1.97 m (6 ft 6 in)	81 kg (179 lb)	25 – 29 April 2001
C	26	(France)	Lessort, Mathias	2.06 m (6 ft 9 in)	112 kg (247 lb)	31 – 29 September 1995
G/F	32	(Serbia)	Trifunović, Uroš	1.99 m (6 ft 6 in)	88 kg (194 lb)	25 – 5 December 2000
PG	41	(Israel)	Madar, Yam	1.90 m (6 ft 3 in)	82 kg (181 lb)	25 – 21 December 2000

Head coach

- (Serbia) Željko Obradović

Assistant coach(es)

- (Serbia) Vladimir Androić
- (Serbia) Aleksandar Matović
- (Spain) Josep Maria Izquierdo
- (Serbia) Bogdan Karaičić

Strength & conditioning coach(es)

- (Serbia) Predrag Zimonjić

Team manager

- (Serbia) Zoran Savić

Legend

- (C) Team captain
- (R) Reserves
- Injured

- Roster
- Transactions
Updated: January 27, 2022

=== Players with multiple nationalities ===
- (United States) (Serbia) Kevin Punter
- (Serbia) (Greece) (Sweden) Tristan Vukčević
- (United States) (Albania) Dallas Moore

=== Depth chart ===
Pos.	Starting 5	Bench 1	Bench 2	Bench 3
C	Mathias Lessort	Balša Koprivica		Dušan Miletić
PF	Zach LeDay	Alen Smailagić	Tristan Vukčević
SF	Rade Zagorac	Uroš Trifunović	Rodions Kurucs	Nemanja Dangubić
SG	Kevin Punter	Dallas Moore	Gregor Glas
PG	Aleksa Avramović	Yam Madar

=== On loan ===
Partizan NIS players out on loan
Nat.	Player	Position	Team	On loan since
(Serbia)	Nikola Radovanović	SF	(Serbia) OKK Dunav (Two-way affiliate)	September 2021
(Serbia)	Mihailo Petrović	PG	(Serbia) OKK Dunav (Two-way affiliate)	September 2021
(United States)	Trey Drechsel	SG	(Poland) BM Slam Stal Ostrów Wielkopolski	September 2021
(Serbia)	Luka Tarlać	SF	(Serbia) OKK Dunav (Two-way affiliate)	September 2021
(Montenegro)	Đorđije Jovanović	SG	(Serbia) OKK Dunav (Two-way affiliate)	September 2021

=== Roster changes ===
==== In ====
No.	Pos.	Nat.	Name	Moving from		Type	Date	Source
0	SG	(United States)	Kevin Punter	Olimpia Milano	(Italy)	End of contract	2 July 2021	
4	G	(Serbia)	Aleksa Avramović	Movistar Estudiantes	(Spain)	End of contract	6 July 2021	
2	PF	(United States)	Zach LeDay	Olimpia Milano	(Italy)	End of contract	6 July 2021	
00	SF	(Latvia)	Rodions Kurucs	Milwaukee Bucks	(United States)	End of contract	7 July 2021	
14	SG	(Albania)	Dallas Moore	Guangzhou Loong Lions	(China)	End of contract	24 July 2021	
9	F/C	(Serbia)	Alen Smailagić	Golden State Warriors	(United States)	Waived	6 August 2021	
41	PG	(Israel)	Yam Madar	Hapoel Tel Aviv	(Israel)	Transfer	18 August 2021	
5	C	(Serbia)	Balša Koprivica	Florida State	(United States)	Unsigned draft pick	23 August 2021	
24	SG	(Slovenia)	Gregor Glas	Dynamic Belgrade	(Serbia)	End of contract	26 September 2021	
26	C	(France)	Mathias Lessort	Maccabi Tel Aviv	(Israel)	End of contract	20 December 2021	
1	PF	(Serbia)	Tristan Vukčević	Real Madrid	(Spain)	End of contract	27 January 2022	

==== Out ====
No.	Pos.	Nat.	Name	Moving to		Type	Date	Source
00	C	(United States)	Eric Mika	JL Bourg	(France)	End of contract	1 July 2021	
10	SG	(Serbia)	Ognjen Jaramaz	Bayern Munich	(Germany)	End of contract	1 July 2021	
13	PG	(United States)	Josh Perkins	New Basket Brindisi	(Italy)	End of contract	17 July 2021	
21	C	(Serbia)	Nikola Janković	Podgorica	(Montenegro)	End of contract	1 July 2021	
25	PF	(United States)	Rashawn Thomas	Ulsan Hyundai Mobis Phoebus	(South Korea)	Parted ways	8 August 2021	
12	PF	(Serbia)	Novica Veličković	Retired		End of contract	8 July 2021	
33	PF/C	(Serbia)	Stefan Janković	Tsmoki Minsk	(Belarus)	Parted ways	29 July 2021	
9	SG	(Serbia)	Lazar Stefanović	Utah Utes	(United States)	Unattached	July 2021	
8	SF	(Serbia)	Vidan Dronjak	Dynamic Belgrade	(Serbia)	Unattached	5 August 2021	
5	PG	(Serbia) (United States)	Marcus Paige	Orléans Loiret Basket	(France)	Parted ways	16 September 2021	
42	C	(United States)	William Mosley	Mornar	(Montenegro)	Parted ways	1 July 2021	
7	PF	(Serbia)	Aleksa Stepanović	FMP	(Serbia)	Parted ways	16 November 2021	
	SF	(Serbia)	Luka Tarlać	Utah Utes	(United States)	Unattached	3 June 2022	

== Pre-season and friendlies ==
Win Loss

27 August 2021	Zlatibor (Serbia)	67–88	(Serbia) Partizan	Čajetina
19:00	Scoring by quarter: 13–29, 23–14, 15–23, 16–22
	Pts: Ross 15; Rebs: not available Asts: not available	Report	Pts: Avramović 19; Rebs: LeDay 7 Asts: Avramović 5	Arena: Čajetina Sports Hall

7 September 2021	Radnički Kragujevac (Serbia)	65–79	(Serbia) Partizan	Kragujevac
19:00	Scoring by quarter: 10–9, 23–11, 15–34, 17–25
	Pts: Dumić 16; Rebs: Katić 7 Asts: Katić 4	Report	Pts: Avramović 16; Rebs: Madar 11; Asts: Madar 7	Arena: Jezero Hall; Attendance: 1,500

16 September 2021	Partizan (Serbia)	92–85	(Turkey) Anadolu Efes	Belgrade
19:00	Scoring by quarter: 23–23, 23–22, 20–19, 26–21
RTS	Pts: Zagorac 15; Rebs: not available Asts: not available	Report	Pts: Micić 16; Rebs: Moerman, Anderson 6 Asts: Beaubois, Micić 5	Arena: Štark Arena; Attendance: 15,000

=== Liburnia Cup ===
1 September 2021 SF	Partizan (Serbia)	64–71	(Croatia) Cibona	Opatija
20:00	Scoring by quarter: 11–22, 22–14, 11–9, 20–26
Sport Klub	Pts: Madar 12; Rebs: LeDay 9 Asts: Avramović 4	Report	Pts: Branković, Reuvers 13; Rebs: Reuvers 7 Asts: Vildoza 4	Arena: Marino Cvetković Sports Hall; Attendance: 200

3 September 2021 3rd	Partizan (Serbia)	100–83	(Slovenia) Cedevita Olimpija	Opatija
17:00	Scoring by quarter: 22–16, 25–17, 26–24, 27–26
Sport Klub	Pts: Smailagić 22; Rebs: LeDay 9 Asts: Avramović 7	Report	Pts: Keene 18; Rebs: Blažič 9 Asts: Rupnik 5	Arena: Marino Cvetković Sports Hall; Attendance: 220

=== Istanball Cup ===
11 September 2021 SF	Partizan (Serbia)	120–114(OT)	(France) Monaco	Istanbul
16:00	Scoring by quarter: 24–22, 27–14, 18–28, 15–20, Overtime: 36–30
	Pts: Smailagić 32; Rebs: Smailagić 8 Asts: Madar 7	Report	Pts: Gray 19; Rebs: Hall 12; Asts: Lee 5	Arena: Ülker Sports Arena; Attendance: 2,000; Referees: Damir Javor, Robert Vyklicky, Seastian Bittner

12 September 2021 F	Partizan (Serbia)	62–89	(Turkey) Fenerbahçe Beko	Istanbul
19:00	Scoring by quarter: 10–22, 23–25, 15–29, 14–13
	Pts: LeDay 15; Rebs: Miletić 6 Asts: Madar, Zagorac 4	Report	Pts: Akpınar 16; Rebs: Düverioğlu 10; Asts: de Colo, Biberović 4	Arena: Ülker Sports Arena; Attendance: 4,000; Referees: Damir Javor, Gentian Cici, Seastian Bittner

=== Giannakopoulos Cup ===
18 September 2021 SF	Panathinaikos (Greece)	89–85(OT)	(Serbia) Partizan	Athens
19:00	Scoring by quarter: 14–20, 17–28, 28–20, 21–12, Overtime: 9–5
Sport Klub	Pts: Papapetrou 20; Rebs: not available Asts: not available	Report	Pts: LeDay 17; Rebs: not available Asts: not available	Arena: O.A.C.A. Olympic Indoor Hall

19 September 2021 3rd	Partizan (Serbia)	84–94	(Germany) ratiopharm Ulm	Athens
16:00	Scoring by quarter: 21–26, 21–24, 13–22, 29–22
Sport Klub	Pts: Avramović 21; Rebs: not available Asts: not available	Report	Pts: Blossomgame 20; Rebs: not available Asts: not available	Arena: O.A.C.A. Olympic Indoor Hall

== Adriatic League ==
=== Regular season ===
Pos	Team	Pld	W	L	PF	PA	PD	Pts	Qualification or relegation
1	(Serbia) Crvena zvezda mts	26	24	2	2140	1819	+321	50	Advance to the semifinals
2	(Serbia) Partizan NIS	26	22	4	2178	1840	+338	48	Advance to the semifinals
3	(Montenegro) Budućnost VOLI	26	19	7	2102	1902	+200	45	Advance to the preliminary round
4	(Slovenia) Cedevita Olimpija	26	18	8	2205	2056	+149	44	Advance to the preliminary round
5	(Bosnia and Herzegovina) Igokea m:tel	26	15	11	2053	1959	+94	41	Advance to the preliminary round

Source: ABA League

=== Matches ===
Win Loss

27 September 2021 1	Zadar (Croatia)	73–78	(Serbia) Partizan	Zadar
18:00	Scoring by quarter: 21–21, 13–21, 20–18, 19–18
Arena Sport	Pts: Vuković 16; Rebs: Vuković 7 Asts: Mavra 5 PIR: Vuković 16	Report	Pts: Punter, Moore 14; Rebs: LeDay 10; Asts: Punter 4 PIR: LeDay 19	Arena: Krešimir Ćosić Hall; Attendance: 1 Referees: Matej Boltauzer, Damir Javor, Edo Javor

30 September 2021 2	Split (Croatia)	59–69	(Serbia) Partizan	Split
16:30	Scoring by quarter: 15–17, 9–21, 19–15, 16–16
Arena Sport	Pts: Perković 17; Rebs: Žganec 11; Asts: McLean 4 PIR: Žganec 20	Report	Pts: LeDay 15; Rebs: Smailagić 13; Asts: Smailagić 5 PIR: Smailagić 29	Arena: Arena Gripe; Attendance: 1,000; Referees: Igor Dragojević, Miloš Koljenšić, Ernad Karović

9 October 2021 3	Partizan (Serbia)	79–57	(Montenegro) SC Derby	Belgrade
19:00	Scoring by quarter: 20–9, 17–14, 24–21, 18–13
Arena Sport	Pts: Smailagić 13; Rebs: Zagorac 6 Asts: Avramović 5 PIR: Smailagić 19	Report	Pts: Vinales, Baćović, Kamenjaš 10; Rebs: Kamenjaš 10; Asts: Vinales 5 PIR: Kamenjaš 15	Arena: Štark Arena; Attendance: 5,283; Referees: Saša Pukl, Matej Špendl, Marko Mustapić

15 October 2021 4	Cibona (Croatia)	61–79	(Serbia) Partizan	Zagreb
19:00	Scoring by quarter: 11–22, 26–19, 13–16, 11–22
Arena Sport	Pts: Prkačin 14; Rebs: Prkačin 10; Asts: Radovčić 4 PIR: Prkačin 16	Report	Pts: LeDay 24; Rebs: LeDay 5 Asts: LeDay 6 PIR: LeDay 36	Arena: Dražen Petrović Basketball Hall; Attendance: 2,000; Referees: Milan Nedović, Matej Špendl, Dragan Porobić

23 October 2021 5	Partizan (Serbia)	92–45	(Slovenia) Krka	Belgrade
19:00	Scoring by quarter: 18–11, 25–17, 21–6, 28–21
Arena Sport	Pts: Madar 23; Rebs: Koprivica 6 Asts: Madar, Kurucs 4 PIR: Madar 32	Report	Pts: Macura 9 Rebs: Macura 7 Asts: Stipčević, Stavrov 3 PIR: Kosi 7	Arena: Aleksandar Nikolić Hall; Attendance: 3,321; Referees: Sašo Petek, Edo Javor, Ivan Stefanović

30 October 2021 6	Borac Čačak (Serbia)	68–86	(Serbia) Partizan	Čačak
19:00	Scoring by quarter: 10–19, 21–25, 20–30, 17–12
Arena Sport	Pts: Lešić 14; Rebs: Pecarski 9 Asts: Novaković 4 PIR: Pecarski 17	Report	Pts: LeDay 14; Rebs: Koprivica 7 Asts: Punter 7 PIR: Avramović, Smailagić 19	Arena: Borac Hall; Attendance: 1,000; Referees: Ilija Belošević, Milivoje Jovčić, Vladimir Vesković

6 November 2021 7	Partizan (Serbia)	74–69	(Serbia) FMP Meridian	Belgrade
21:00	Scoring by quarter: 20–13, 19–17, 23–18, 12–21
Arena Sport	Pts: LeDay 18; Rebs: Koprivica 9 Asts: Avramović 4 PIR: LeDay 20	Report	Pts: Izundu 20; Rebs: Izundu 9 Asts: Jones 7 PIR: Izundu 23	Arena: Aleksandar Nikolić Hall; Attendance: 4,877; Referees: Miloš Koljenšić, Krunoslav Peić, Radoš Savović

14 November 2021 8	Crvena zvezda mts (Serbia)	71–56	(Serbia) Partizan	Belgrade
19:00	Scoring by quarter: 15–8, 17–13, 15–19, 24–16
Arena Sport	Pts: Mitrović 16; Rebs: Mitrović 7 Asts: Wolters, Kalinić 5 PIR: Mitrović 22	Report	Pts: Smailagić 15; Rebs: Smailagić 9 Asts: Punter, Zagorac, Avramović, Moore 2 PIR: Smailagić 20	Arena: Aleksandar Nikolić Hall; Attendance: 7,187; Referees: Ilija Belošević, Milivoje Jovčić, Josip Radojković

20 November 2021 9	Partizan (Serbia)	75–66	(Montenegro) Budućnost VOLI	Belgrade
20:00	Scoring by quarter: 20–13, 21–17, 12–18, 22–18
Arena Sport	Pts: Smailagić 20; Rebs: Smailagić 7 Asts: Avramović 5 PIR: Smailagić 24	Report	Pts: Seeley 21; Rebs: Wiley 6 Asts: Cobbs 5 PIR: Seeley 21	Arena: Štark Arena; Attendance: 8,944; Referees: Matej Boltauzer, Damir Javor, Sašo Petek

4 December 2021 10	Igokea (Bosnia and Herzegovina)	68–70	(Serbia) Partizan	Laktaši
19:00	Scoring by quarter: 15–16, 20–12, 19–19, 14–23
Arena Sport	Pts: Stephens, Waller 18; Rebs: Stephens 7 Asts: Starks 8 PIR: Stephens 20	Report	Pts: Smailagić 15; Rebs: Zagorac, Madar 5 Asts: Madar 4 PIR: LeDay, Smailagić, Madar 14	Arena: Laktaši Sports Hall; Attendance: 2,500; Referees: Tomislav Hordov, Luka Kardum, Bojan Kruljac

11 December 2021 11	Partizan (Serbia)	89–96	(Slovenia) Cedevita Olimpija	Belgrade
19:00	Scoring by quarter: 27–26, 22–23, 19–22, 21–25
Arena Sport	Pts: LeDay 17; Rebs: Madar, Avramović, Trifunović 4 Asts: LeDay 5 PIR: LeDay 23	Report	Pts: Blažić, Pullen 19; Rebs: Auguste 7 Asts: Ferrell 6 PIR: Blažić 22	Arena: Štark Arena; Attendance: 7,476; Referees: Ilija Belošević, Miloš Koljenšić, Milan Nedović

18 December 2021 12	Mornar Barsko zlato (Montenegro)	64–66	(Serbia) Partizan	Bar
17:00	Scoring by quarter: 16–27, 13–16, 12–6, 23–17
Arena Sport	Pts: Gordić 18; Rebs: Smith 8 Asts: Gordić 7 PIR: Gordić 23	Report	Pts: Smailagić 18; Rebs: Smailagić, LeDay 7 Asts: Madar 6 PIR: LeDay 18	Arena: Topolica Sport Hall; Attendance: 100; Referees: Saša Pukl, Mario Majkić, Dragan Porobić

20 January 2022* 13	Partizan (Serbia)	90–93	(Serbia) Mega Mozzart	Belgrade
17:00	Scoring by quarter: 22–26, 24–29, 19–19, 25–19
Arena Sport	Pts: Punter 24; Rebs: Punter, Lessort 7 Asts: Punter, Avramović, Madar, Kurucs 3 PIR: Punter 24	Report	Pts: Ruzhentsev 20; Rebs: Ruzhentsev 7 Asts: Cerovina 6 PIR: Ruzhentsev 22	Arena: Aleksandar Nikolić Hall; Attendance: 3,000; Referees: Tomislav Hordov, Miloš Koljenšić, Bojan Kruljac
Note: The game was originally scheduled to be played on 27 December. Mega Basket requested the suspension of the game due to local legislation imposing quarantine measures on the team. Afterwards, the game was rescheduled to 20 January.

3 January 2022 14	Partizan (Serbia)	103–72	(Croatia) Zadar	Belgrade
18:00	Scoring by quarter: 21–16, 22–16, 27–23, 33–17
Arena Sport	Pts: Zagorac, Koprivica 17; Rebs: Lessort 8 Asts: LeDay, Avramović 5 PIR: Koprivica 24	Report	Pts: Buljan 16; Rebs: Bursać 5 Asts: Junaković 5 PIR: Carter 15	Arena: Štark Arena; Attendance: 5,434; Referees: Milivoje Jovčić, Krunoslav Peić, Radoš Arsenijević

5 January 2022 15	Partizan (Serbia)	109–49	(Croatia) Split	Belgrade
18:45	Scoring by quarter: 17–12, 34–5, 32–21, 26–11
Arena Sport	Pts: Glas 19; Rebs: Miletić 10; Asts: Glas 5 PIR: Glas, Miletić 27	Report	Pts: Shorter 17; Rebs: Žganec 8 Asts: Vuko 3 PIR: Žganec 17	Arena: Štark Arena; Attendance: 4,231; Referees: Igor Dragojević, Radoš Savović, Tomislav Stapić

15 January 2022 16	SC Derby (Montenegro)	83–93	(Serbia) Partizan	Podgorica
19:00	Scoring by quarter: 24–22, 19–19, 24–20, 16–32
Arena Sport	Pts: Kamenjaš 20; Rebs: Kamenjaš 12; Asts: Pavličević 8 PIR: Kamenjaš 26	Report	Pts: Punter 17; Rebs: Smailagić 6 Asts: Punter 4 PIR: Punter 26	Arena: Morača Sports Center; Attendance: 1 Referees: Tomislav Hordov, Josip Radojković, Denis Hadžić

15 April 2022* 17	Partizan (Serbia)	98–77	(Croatia) Cibona	Belgrade
19:00	Scoring by quarter: 27−16, 25−20, 19−21, 27−20
Arena Sport	Pts: Madar 17; Rebs: LeDay, Lessort 5 Asts: Lessort 5 PIR: Lessort 26	Report	Pts: Gegić 14; Rebs: Prkačin 8 Asts: Vildoza 6 PIR: Prkačin 17	Arena: Aleksandar Nikolić Hall; Attendance: 2,766; Referees: Saša Pukl, Mario Majkić, Gordan Terlević
Note: The game was originally scheduled to be played on 22 January. Cibona requested the suspension of the game due to local legislation imposing quarantine measures on the team. Afterwards, the game was rescheduled to 15 April.

28 January 2022 18	Krka (Slovenia)	63–79	(Serbia) Partizan	Novo Mesto
17:00	Scoring by quarter: 11–23, 19–16, 10–17, 23–23
Arena Sport	Pts: Stipčević 15; Rebs: Lapornik 8 Asts: Lapornik 4 PIR: Stipčević, Lapornik 17	Report	Pts: Koprivica 15; Rebs: Smailagić 9 Asts: Moore 3 PIR: Smailagić 19	Arena: Leon Štukelj Hall; Attendance: 720; Referees: Denis Hadžić, Bojan Kruljac, Gordan Terlević

5 February 2022 19	Partizan (Serbia)	75–68	(Serbia) Borac Čačak	Belgrade
17:00	Scoring by quarter: 18–17, 13–14, 22–14, 22–23
Arena Sport	Pts: Avramović 20; Rebs: LeDay 9 Asts: Punter, Kurucs 5 PIR: Avramović 26	Report	Pts: Todorović 13; Rebs: Pecarski 7 Asts: I. Đoković, R. Đoković, López 3 PIR: Todorović 11	Arena: Aleksandar Nikolić Hall; Attendance: 2,713; Referees: Milan Nedović, Josip Radojković, Tomislav Vovk

12 February 2022 20	FMP Meridian (Serbia)	80–86	(Serbia) Partizan	Belgrade
19:00	Scoring by quarter: 24–18, 22–22, 16–24, 18–22
Arena Sport	Pts: Tasić 16; Rebs: Simović 6 Asts: Jones 14; PIR: Tasić 16	Report	Pts: Moore 21; Rebs: Koprivica 11; Asts: Punter 4 PIR: Koprivica, Lessort 21	Arena: Železnik Hall; Attendance: 723; Referees: Miloš Koljenšić, Uroš Obrknežević, Luka Kardum

6 March 2022 21	Partizan (Serbia)	98–84	(Serbia) Crvena zvezda mts	Belgrade
18:30	Scoring by quarter: 28–21, 12–13, 24–29, 34–21
Arena Sport	Pts: Avramović 33; Rebs: Lessort 7 Asts: Avramović 6 PIR: Avramović 32	Report	Pts: Davidovac, Hollins 17; Rebs: Davidovac 10; Asts: Kalinić 6 PIR: Davidovac 23	Arena: Aleksandar Nikolić Hall; Attendance: 6,884; Referees: Matej Boltauzer, Josip Radojković, Milan Nedović

13 March 2022 22	Budućnost VOLI (Montenegro)	72–80	(Serbia) Partizan	Podgorica
19:00	Scoring by quarter: 13–24, 24–17, 14–17, 21–22
Arena Sport	Pts: Perry 16; Rebs: Reed 6 Asts: Seeley 4 PIR: Perry, Cobbs 17	Report	Pts: Avramović, Punter, Madar 13; Rebs: LeDay 9 Asts: Madar 4 PIR: Madar 22	Arena: Morača Sports Center; Attendance: 5,000; Referees: Damir Javor, Sašo Petek, Matej Špendl

19 March 2022 23	Partizan (Serbia)	83–70	(Bosnia and Herzegovina) Igokea	Belgrade
19:00	Scoring by quarter: 15–20, 24–8, 26–23, 18–19
Arena Sport	Pts: Punter 20; Rebs: LeDay 11; Asts: Madar 6 PIR: LeDay 30	Report	Pts: Waller 19; Rebs: Stephens 6 Asts: Robinson 8 PIR: Waller 24	Arena: Aleksandar Nikolić Hall; Attendance: 3,044; Referees: Ilija Belošević, Luka Kardum, Ernad Karović

27 March 2022 24	Cedevita Olimpija (Slovenia)	81–79	(Serbia) Partizan	Ljubljana
17:00	Scoring by quarter: 22–23, 21–23, 18–21, 20–12
Arena Sport	Pts: Blažič 25; Rebs: Dragić 6 Asts: Ferrell 4 PIR: Blažič 30	Report	Pts: Avramović 21; Rebs: Lessort 7 Asts: Madar 4 PIR: Punter 15	Arena: Tivoli Hall; Attendance: 4,500; Referees: Uroš Nikolić, Miloš Koljenšić, Sašo Petek

2 April 2022 25	Partizan (Serbia)	95–83	(Montenegro) Mornar Barsko zlato	Belgrade
21:00	Scoring by quarter: 23–11, 20–19, 24–27, 28–26
Arena Sport	Pts: LeDay 24; Rebs: Koprivica 11; Asts: LeDay 5 PIR: LeDay 34	Report	Pts: Mihailović 25; Rebs: Mosley 7 Asts: Mihailović, Mosley, Šehović 4 PIR: Mihailović 30	Arena: Aleksandar Nikolić Hall; Attendance: 3,606; Referees: Igor Dragojević, Aleksandar Milojević, Nermin Nikšić

10 April 2022 26	Mega Mozzart (Serbia)	68–97	(Serbia) Partizan	Belgrade
12:00	Scoring by quarter: 24–26, 8–26, 16–20, 20–25
Arena Sport	Pts: Simanić 19; Rebs: Jović 5 Asts: Smith 6 PIR: Simanić 18	Report	Pts: Punter 16; Rebs: Lessort 8 Asts: Avramović 6 PIR: Punter, Madar 20	Arena: Ranko Žeravica Sports Hall; Attendance: 1,500; Referees: Matej Boltauzer, Tomislav Hordov, Tomislav Vovk

=== Semifinals ===
10 May 2022 G1	Partizan (Serbia)	82–66 (Series: 1−0)	(Montenegro) Budućnost VOLI	Belgrade
19:00	Scoring by quarter: 18−15, 23−13, 20−21, 21−17
Arena Sport	Pts: LeDay 19; Rebs: Lessort 9 Asts: Lessort 6 PIR: Lessort 27	Report	Pts: Seeley 16; Rebs: Jagodić-Kuridža 10; Asts: Perry 4 PIR: Cobbs 17	Arena: Aleksandar Nikolić Hall; Attendance: 6,500; Referees: Matej Boltauzer, Josip Radojković, Mario Majkić

15 May 2022 G2	Budućnost VOLI (Montenegro)	72–71 (Series: 1−1)	(Serbia) Partizan	Podgorica
20:30	Scoring by quarter: 20−17, 18−10, 17−22, 17−22
Arena Sport	Pts: Perry, Popović 15; Rebs: Jagodić-Kuridža, Nikolića 6 Asts: Cobbs 2 PIR: Popović 19	Report	Pts: LeDay 28; Rebs: LeDay 8 Asts: Avramović 4 PIR: LeDay 37	Arena: Morača Sports Center; Attendance: 4,550; Referees: Damir Javor, Tomislav Hordov, Denis Hadžić

22 May 2022 G3	Partizan (Serbia)	101–77 (Series: 2−1)	(Montenegro) Budućnost VOLI	Belgrade
21:00	Scoring by quarter: 26−21, 29−14, 22−24, 24−18
Arena Sport	Pts: Punter 30; Rebs: Koprivica 7 Asts: Avramović, Madar 5 PIR: Punter 31	Report	Pts: Seeley 20; Rebs: Jagodić-Kuridža 6 Asts: Cobbs 6 PIR: Seeley 17	Arena: Aleksandar Nikolić Hall; Attendance: 6,998; Referees: Saša Pukl, Damir Javor, Sašo Petek

=== Finals ===
27 May 2022 G1	Crvena zvezda mts (Serbia)	90–76 (Series: 1−0)	(Serbia) Partizan	Belgrade
20:00	Scoring by quarter: 19−23, 23−16, 24−19, 24−18
Arena Sport	Pts: Ivanović 18; Rebs: Davidovac 5 Asts: Ivanović, Kalinić 5 PIR: Ivanović 18	Report	Pts: Punter 15; Rebs: Lessort 6 Asts: Avramović 4 PIR: Avramović 15	Arena: Aleksandar Nikolić Hall; Attendance: 6,886; Referees: Saša Pukl, Uroš Obrknežević, Josip Radojković

29 May 2022 G2	Crvena zvezda mts (Serbia)	85–81 (Series: 2−0)	(Serbia) Partizan	Belgrade
20:00	Scoring by quarter: 29−18, 18−22, 15−13, 23−28
Arena Sport	Pts: Kalinić 25; Rebs: Mitrović 6 Asts: Wolters 8 PIR: Kalinić 29	Report	Pts: Avramović 21; Rebs: Lessort, LeDay 7 Asts: Lessort, Zagorac, Moore, Madar 3 PIR: Lessort 28	Arena: Aleksandar Nikolić Hall; Attendance: 7,238; Referees: Ilija Belošević, Igor Dragojević, Mario Majkić

1 June 2022 G3	Partizan (Serbia)	70–67 (Series: 1−2)	(Serbia) Crvena zvezda mts	Belgrade
20:30	Scoring by quarter: 21−17, 18−14, 8−23, 23−13
Arena Sport	Pts: Punter 22; Rebs: Punter 5 Asts: Punter 6 PIR: Punter 34	Report	Pts: Dobrić 20; Rebs: Mitrović, Kuzmić 5 Asts: Marković 5 PIR: Dobrić 21	Arena: Aleksandar Nikolić Hall; Attendance: 7,226; Referees: Matej Boltauzer, Uroš Nikolić, Milan Nedović

3 June 2022 G4	Partizan (Serbia)	112–84 (Series: 2−2)	(Serbia) Crvena zvezda mts	Belgrade
18:30	Scoring by quarter: 35−27, 33−16, 20−20, 24−21
Arena Sport	Pts: Avramović 24; Rebs: Lessort 5 Asts: Avramović 6 PIR: Avramović 33	Report	Pts: Hollins 19; Rebs: Lazarević, Mitrović, Hollins, Marković, Kuzmić 3 Asts: Ivanović 4 PIR: Hollins 18	Arena: Aleksandar Nikolić Hall; Attendance: 3,922; Referees: Damir Javor, Sašo Petek, Luka Kardum

6 June 2022 G5	Crvena zvezda mts (Serbia)	80–77 (Series: 3−2)	(Serbia) Partizan	Belgrade
20:00	Scoring by quarter: 18−20, 15−17, 26−21, 21−19
Arena Sport	Pts: Davidovac 15; Rebs: Davidovac, Kalinić 6 Asts: Wolters 7 PIR: Davidovac 20	Report	Pts: Punter 27; Rebs: Lessort 13; Asts: Avramović 4 PIR: Punter 21	Arena: Aleksandar Nikolić Hall; Attendance: 5,634; Referees: Saša Pukl, Tomislav Hordov, Miloš Koljenšić

== EuroCup ==
=== Regular season ===
==== Standings ====
Pos	Team	Pld	W	L	PF	PA	PD	Qualification
1	(Spanish Basketball Federation) Joventut	16	12	4	1297	1130	+167	Advance to eighthfinals
2	(Basketball Federation of Serbia) Partizan NIS	16	12	4	1353	1204	+149	Advance to eighthfinals
3	(French Federation of Basketball) Metropolitans 92	16	11	5	1314	1256	+58	Advance to eighthfinals
4	(Spanish Basketball Federation) MoraBanc Andorra	16	10	6	1304	1271	+33	Advance to eighthfinals
5	(Lithuanian Basketball Federation) Lietkabelis	16	9	7	1263	1181	+82	Advance to eighthfinals

Source: EuroCup
Rules for classification: All points scored in extra period(s) were not counted in the standings, nor for any tie-break situation.

==== Matches ====
Win Loss

19 October 2021 1	Hamburg Towers (Germany)	97–106	(Serbia) Partizan	Hamburg
19:30	Scoring by quarter: 24–28, 16–33, 26–27, 31–18
Sport Klub	Pts: Homesley 21; Rebs: Brown 6 Asts: Homesley 7 PIR: Homesley 23	Report	Pts: Punter 26; Rebs: Smailagić 9 Asts: Zagorac, Madar 5 PIR: Punter 38	Arena: Edel-optics.de Arena; Attendance: 1,663; Referees: Miguel Angel Perez, Joseph Bissang, Sinan Isguder

27 October 2021 2	Partizan (Serbia)	85–59	(Turkey) Türk Telekom	Belgrade
20:30	Scoring by quarter: 21–12, 20–22, 23–7, 21–18
Sport Klub	Pts: Punter 19; Rebs: Koprivica 7 Asts: Avramović 4 PIR: Punter 24	Report	Pts: Johnson 14; Rebs: Demir, Ellis 7 Asts: Öğüt 7 PIR: Johnson 15	Arena: Aleksandar Nikolić Hall; Attendance: 5,162; Referees: Daniel Hierrezuelo, Marcin Kowalski, Maxime Boubert

2 November 2021 3	Partizan (Serbia)	68–67	(Spain) Joventut	Belgrade
20:30	Scoring by quarter: 19–17, 15–22, 15–20, 19–8
Sport Klub	Pts: Punter 18; Rebs: LeDay 6 Asts: Smailagić 3 PIR: Punter, LeDay 17	Report	Pts: Parra 15; Rebs: Tomić 8 Asts: Ribas 9 PIR: Parra 15	Arena: Aleksandar Nikolić Hall; Attendance: 6,733; Referees: Luigi Lamonica, Aare Halliko, Artem Lavrukhin

10 November 2021 4	MoraBanc Andorra (Spain)	61–60	(Serbia) Partizan	Andorra la Vella
20:00	Scoring by quarter: 16–12, 8–20, 24–8, 13–20
Sport Klub	Pts: Arteaga 15; Rebs: Miller-McIntyre 10; Asts: Hannah 7 PIR: Arteaga 20	Report	Pts: Punter 13; Rebs: LeDay 10; Asts: Avramović, Trifunović 2 PIR: Avramović 16	Arena: Poliesportiu d'Andorra; Attendance: 2,276; Referees: Robert Lottermoser, Rain Peerandi, Vasiliki Tsaroucha

17 November 2021 5	Partizan (Serbia)	84–77	(Lithuania) Lietkabelis	Belgrade
20:30	Scoring by quarter: 20–14, 19–24, 27–22, 18–17
Sport Klub	Pts: LeDay 19; Rebs: Smailagić 12; Asts: Avramović 7 PIR: LeDay 24	Report	Pts: Orelik 19; Rebs: Lipkevičius 10; Asts: Lipkevičius 7 PIR: Lipkevičius 23	Arena: Štark Arena; Attendance: 6,067; Referees: Miguel Angel Perez, Tomasz Trawicki, Vassilis Pitsilkas

8 December 2021 6	Metropolitans 92 (France)	82–89	(Serbia) Partizan	Levallois-Perret
20:30	Scoring by quarter: 28–23, 25–27, 15–18, 14–21
Sport Klub	Pts: Hornsby 22; Rebs: Halilović 7 Asts: Hornsby, Michineau 4 PIR: Hornsby 25	Report	Pts: Punter 28; Rebs: Koprivica 8 Asts: Avramović 5 PIR: Punter 28	Arena: Palais des sports Marcel-Cerdan; Attendance: 2,280; Referees: Oļegs Latiševs, Marcin Kowalski, Guido Giovannetti

15 December 2021 7	Partizan (Serbia)	75–73	(Poland) WKS Śląsk Wrocław	Belgrade
20:30	Scoring by quarter: 22–15, 15–20, 17–17, 21–21
Sport Klub	Pts: Glas 18; Rebs: LeDay, Madar 7 Asts: Glas 5 PIR: Glas 18	Report	Pts: Kanter 21; Rebs: Kanter, Ramljak 8 Asts: Kolenda 8 PIR: Kanter 26	Arena: Štark Arena; Attendance: 5,088; Referees: Carlos Cortes, Hugues Thepenier, Steve Bittner

22 December 2021 8	Lokomotiv Kuban (Russia)	101–94	(Serbia) Partizan	Krasnodar
17:30	Scoring by quarter: 22–23, 23–19, 25–23, 31–29
Sport Klub	Pts: McCollum 33; Rebs: Thompson 9 Asts: Thompson 10; PIR: McCollum 37	Report	Pts: Glas 20; Rebs: Smailagić 7 Asts: LeDay, Zagorac, Avramović, Glas 3 PIR: LeDay 23	Arena: Basket-Hall Krasnodar; Attendance: 1,165; Referees: Luigi Lamonica, Aare Halliko, Saulius Racys

12 January 2022 9	Partizan (Serbia)	97–65	(Italy) Dolomiti Energia Trento	Belgrade
20:30	Scoring by quarter: 27–8, 25–22, 22–23, 23–12
Sport Klub	Pts: Madar 18; Rebs: Koprivica 9 Asts: Madar 4 PIR: Punter 23	Report	Pts: Mezzanotte 15; Rebs: Flaccadori 6 Asts: Forray 5 PIR: Flaccadori 19	Arena: Štark Arena; Attendance: 5,151; Referees: Elias Koromilas, Igor Dragojević, Gentian Cici

18 January 2022 10	Partizan (Serbia)	102–77	(Germany) Hamburg Towers	Belgrade
20:45	Scoring by quarter: 34–14, 31–27, 20–12, 17–24
Sport Klub	Pts: Lessort 22; Rebs: LeDay 8 Asts: Avramović 6 PIR: Lessort 33	Report	Pts: Christen 20; Rebs: Hinrichs 8 Asts: Hinrichs 5 PIR: Christen 20	Arena: Aleksandar Nikolić Hall; Attendance: 5,021; Referees: Seffi Shemmesh, Jurgis Laurinavičius, Kristaps Konstantinovs

25 January 2022 11	Türk Telekom (Turkey)	85–71	(Serbia) Partizan	Ankara
18:00	Scoring by quarter: 21–18, 22–14, 17–14, 25–25
Sport Klub	Pts: Clemmons 20; Rebs: Demir, Ellis 6 Asts: Clemmons 8 PIR: Clemmons 32	Report	Pts: Moore 15; Rebs: Lessort 8 Asts: Avramović 6 PIR: Lessort 17	Arena: Ankara Arena; Attendance: 4,741; Referees: Emin Moğulkoç, Hüseyin Çelik, Maxime Boubert

2 February 2022 12	Joventut (Spain)	92–84	(Serbia) Partizan	Badalona
21:00	Scoring by quarter: 16–27, 25–15, 28–17, 23–25
Sport Klub	Pts: Willis 19; Rebs: Willis, Birgander 7 Asts: Tomić, Bassas 4 PIR: Willis 27	Report	Pts: Lessort 20; Rebs: Lessort 8 Asts: Punter, Madar 3 PIR: Lessort 30	Arena: Palau Municipal d'Esports de Badalona; Attendance: 4,356; Referees: Anne Panther, Tomasz Trawicki, Sébastien Clivaz

9 February 2022 13	Partizan (Serbia)	95–70	(Spain) MoraBanc Andorra	Belgrade
20:30	Scoring by quarter: 24–16, 21–19, 24–19, 26–16
Sport Klub	Pts: LeDay 20; Rebs: Lessort 12; Asts: Punter 5 PIR: Lessort 32	Report	Pts: Hannah 17; Rebs: Paulí 9 Asts: Miller-McIntyre 7 PIR: Paulí 19	Arena: Aleksandar Nikolić Hall; Referees: Matej Boltauzer, Joseph Bissang, Amit Balak

8 March 2022 14	Lietkabelis (Lithuania)	93–78	(Serbia) Partizan	Panevėžys
18:00	Scoring by quarter: 24–24, 29–13, 27–18, 13–23
Sport Klub	Pts: Orelik, Gagić 21; Rebs: Orelik, Gagić, Lipkevičius 5 Asts: Žemaitis 8 PIR: Gagić 25	Report	Pts: Punter 20; Rebs: Lessort 4 Asts: Punter, Avramović, Koprivica, Trifunović 2 PIR: Zagorac 17	Arena: Cido Arena; Attendance: 1,618; Referees: Ioannis Foufis, Nick Van den Broeck, Guido Giovannetti

16 March 2022 15	Partizan (Serbia)	87–72	(France) Metropolitans 92	Belgrade
20:30	Scoring by quarter: 14–17, 29–14, 21–10, 23–31
Sport Klub	Pts: LeDay 15; Rebs: Koprivica 13; Asts: Madar 5 PIR: Koprivica 25	Report	Pts: McRae 18; Rebs: Sy, Halilović, Hunter 4 Asts: McRae 5 PIR: McRae 19	Arena: Aleksandar Nikolić Hall; Attendance: 4,776; Referees: Carlos Peruga, Robert Vyklicky, Sérgio Silva

22 March 2022 16	WKS Śląsk Wrocław (Poland)	71–93	(Serbia) Partizan	Wrocław
18:45	Scoring by quarter: 14–29, 17–21, 22–14, 18–29
Sport Klub	Pts: Karolak 14; Rebs: Kanter 8 Asts: Trice 9 PIR: Trice 21	Report	Pts: Punter, Madar 15; Rebs: Koprivica 8 Asts: Zagorac 3 PIR: LeDay 18	Arena: Hala Orbita; Attendance: 3,351; Referees: Emin Moğulkoç, Michele Rossi, Vasiliki Tsaroucha

30 March 2022 17	Partizan (Serbia)	Suspended	(Russia) Lokomotiv Kuban	Belgrade
20:30
Sport Klub		Report		Arena: Aleksandar Nikolić Hall
Note: Participation of Russian Federation teams is suspended in accordance with the decision of the ECA Shareholders Executive Board.

6 April 2022 18	Dolomiti Energia Trento (Italy)	63–79	(Serbia) Partizan	Trento
20:00	Scoring by quarter: 15–18, 14–19, 24–24, 10–18
Sport Klub	Pts: Reynolds 15; Rebs: Williams 7 Asts: Bradford 6 PIR: Williams, Flaccadori 15	Report	Pts: LeDay 20; Rebs: LeDay 13; Asts: Avramović 5 PIR: LeDay 30	Arena: PalaTrento; Attendance: 1,230; Referees: Emilio Pérez Pizarro, Leandro Lezcano, Vassilis Pitsilkas

=== Knockout phase ===
20 April 2022 Eight-final	Partizan (Serbia)	95–103(OT)	(Turkey) Frutti Extra Bursaspor	Belgrade
20:30	Scoring by quarter: 20–20, 18–17, 22–27, 24–20, Overtime: 11–19
Sport Klub	Pts: Avramović 23; Rebs: Koprivica 10; Asts: Avramović 6 PIR: Lessort 25	Report	Pts: Andrews 24; Rebs: Bitim, Hayes 10; Asts: Andrews 10; PIR: Andrews 35	Arena: Štark Arena; Attendance: 19,224; Referees: Daniel Hierrezuelo, Carmelo Paternicò, Joseph Bissang

== Radivoj Korać Cup ==
Win Loss

18 February 2022 Quarterfinals	Partizan	101–48	Borac Zemun	Niš
21:00	Scoring by quarter: 22–12, 25–18, 26–9, 28–9
Arena Sport	Pts: Vukčević 16; Rebs: Dangubić 8 Asts: Avramović, Dangubić 6 PIR: Dangubić 25	Boxscore	Pts: Balmazović 15; Rebs: Sinovec 5 Asts: Sinovec 5 PIR: Sinovec 14	Arena: Čair Sports Center; Attendance: 3,000; Referees: M. Juras, J. Juras, S. Prpa

19 February 2022 Semifinals	Partizan	92–89	FMP Meridian	Niš
21:00	Scoring by quarter: 21–24, 31–19, 21–17, 19–29
Arena Sport	Pts: Punter 29; Rebs: Koprivica 6 Asts: Punter, Moore 4 PIR: Punter 32	Boxscore	Pts: Jones 29; Rebs: Izundu 10; Asts: Jones 13; PIR: Jones 35	Arena: Čair Sports Center; Attendance: 3,500; Referees: U. Obrknežević, M. Juras, S. Prpa

20 February 2022 Final	Crvena zvezda mts	85–68	Partizan	Niš
21:00	Scoring by quarter: 20–13, 29–15, 18–18, 18–22
Arena Sport	Pts: Kalinić 18; Rebs: Kuzmić 7 Asts: Hollins 5 PIR: Hollins, Wolters 18	Boxscore	Pts: Lessort 19; Rebs: Lessort, LeDay 4 Asts: Moore 5 PIR: Lessort 22	Arena: Čair Sports Center; Attendance: 5,000; Referees: M. Jovčić, M. Juras, A. Glišić

== Serbian League ==
On 9 June 2022, Partizan announced withdrawal from the 2022 Serbian League playoffs following numerous fan incidents in the 2022 ABA League Finals. Following their withdrawal, their semifinals opponent FMP Meridian advanced to the Finals.

== Individual awards ==
Adriatic League

MVP of the Round

- (Israel) Yam Madar – Round 5
- (United States) Zach LeDay – Round 25
- (United States) Zach LeDay – Semifinal Game 2
- (United States) Kevin Punter – Semifinal Game 3
- (United States) Kevin Punter – Final Game 3
- (Serbia) Aleksa Avramović – Final Game 4
- (United States) Kevin Punter – Final Game 5

The Ideal Starting Five

- (United States) Kevin Punter – PG
- (United States) Zach LeDay – PF

Coach of the Season

- (Serbia) Željko Obradović

EuroCup

MVP of the Round

- (France) Mathias Lessort – Round 13
- (United States) Zach LeDay – Round 18

EuroCup Second Team

- (United States) Kevin Punter
