= Charlotte Hornets draft history =

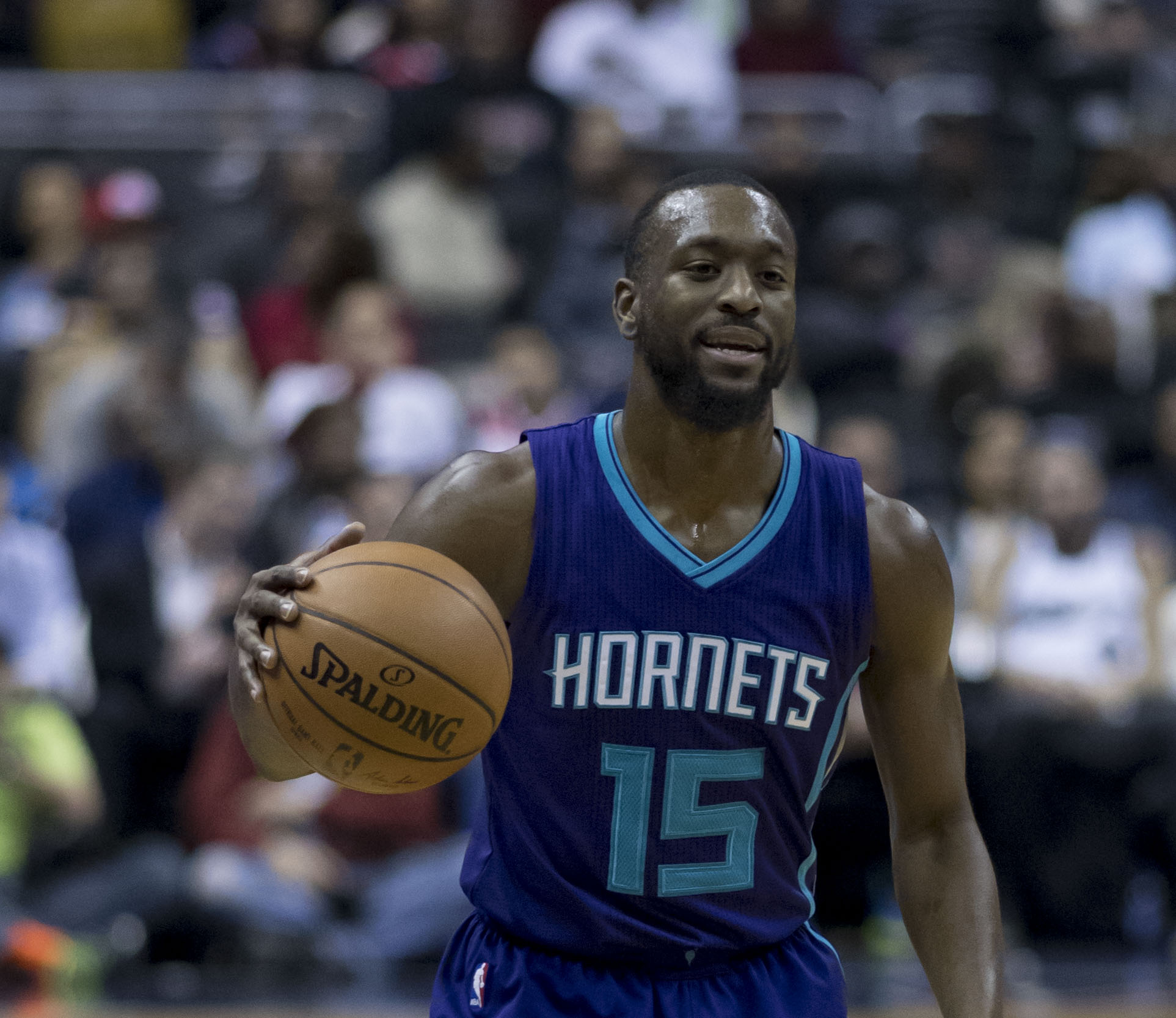
The Hornets selected Kemba Walker with the 9th overall pick of the 2011 NBA draft.

The original Charlotte Hornets of the National Basketball Association (NBA) were established in 1988 as an expansion team, based in Charlotte, North Carolina. The team's roster was filled with unprotected players at the 1988 NBA expansion draft, (Note: To find out more, click on the 1988 NBA expansion draft link.) and five days later the Hornets made their first picks out of college players at the 1988 NBA draft. The Hornets remained in Charlotte for 14 seasons before relocating to New Orleans in 2002. Two years after the Hornets' departure, the Charlotte Bobcats were established in 2004. The Bobcats first participated in the 2004 NBA draft, two days after their expansion draft was held. The franchise's name was changed back to the Hornets at the conclusion of the 2013–14 season, one year after the team in Louisiana renamed itself the New Orleans Pelicans. The history and records of the original Charlotte Hornets were conveyed to the newly named Charlotte Hornets.

In 1989, the NBA agreed with the National Basketball Players Association to reduce drafts to two rounds, an arrangement that has remained the same up the present time. Before each draft, an NBA draft lottery determines the first round selection order for the teams that missed the playoffs during the prior season. Teams can also trade their picks, which means that in some drafts, teams may have more or less than two draft picks, although they must have at least one first-round pick every other year.

The first pick in the Hornets' history was Rex Chapman, a shooting guard from the University of Kentucky. The Hornets had three top-four picks and all of them have participated in the NBA All-Star Game: Larry Johnson, Alonzo Mourning, and Baron Davis. In 1996, the Hornets drafted Kobe Bryant 13th overall, but traded him for Vlade Divac. Bryant finished his career as an MVP, a four-time All-star game MVP, a two-time Finals MVP, an eleven-time all-NBA first team, and a five-time NBA Champion. The first player picked by the Bobcats, Emeka Okafor, was named the 2004–05 Rookie of the Year and voted to the NBA All-Rookie First Team.

== Key ==
| Naismith Basketball Hall of Famer | First overall NBA draft pick | Selected for an NBA All-Star Game |

== Selections ==
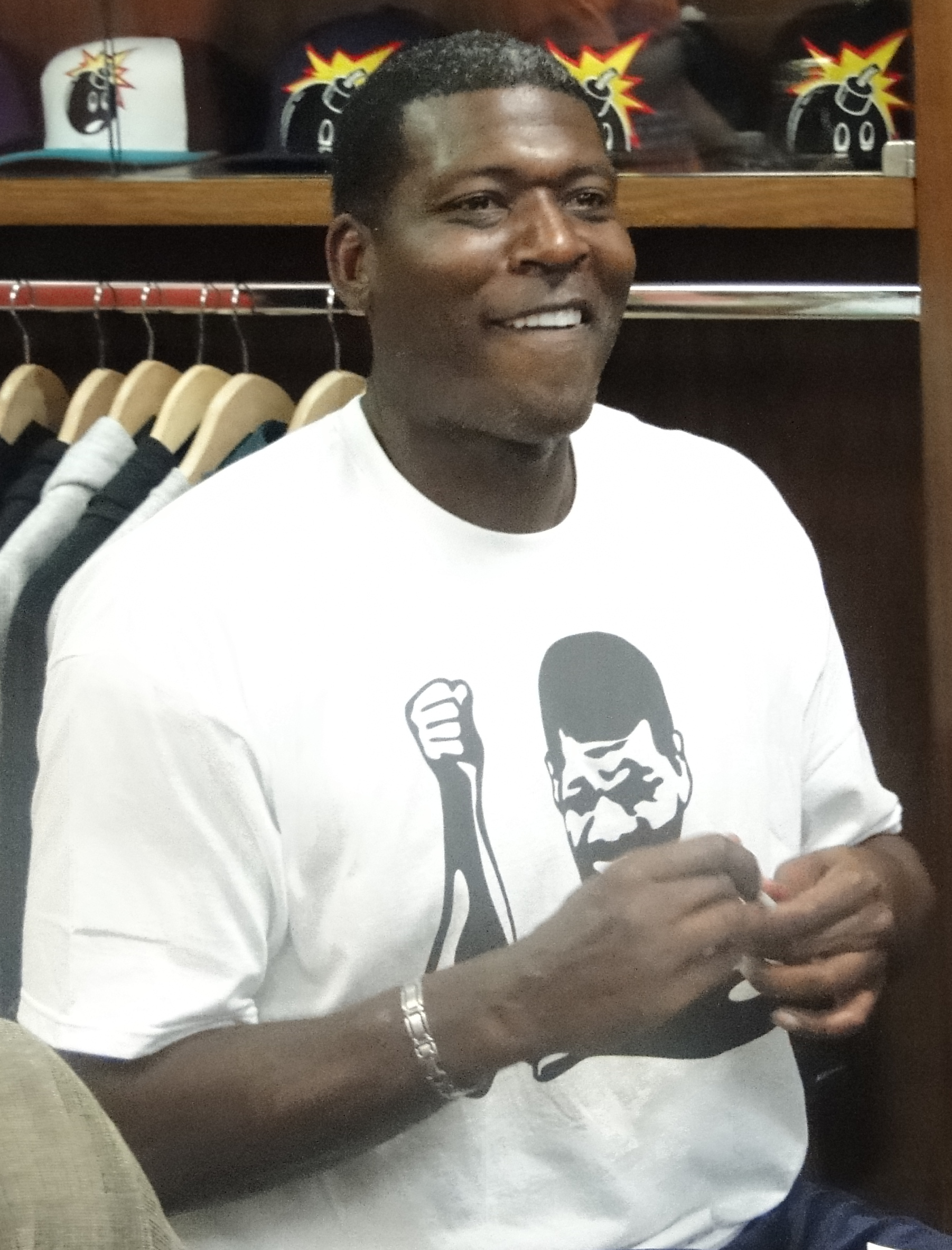
In the 1991 NBA draft, Larry Johnson was selected by the Hornets with the first overall pick.

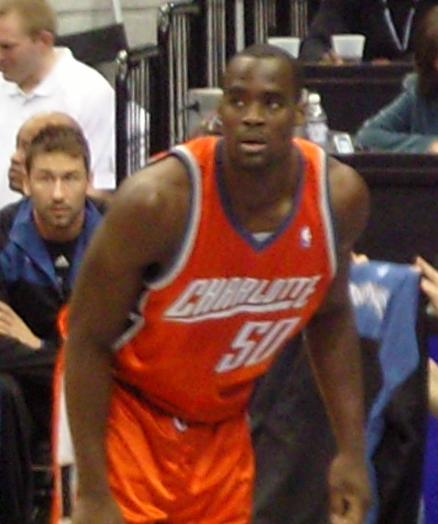
In the 2004 NBA draft, Emeka Okafor became the Bobcats' first ever draft pick.

Charlotte Hornets draft picks
| Year | Round | Pick | Player | Nationality | Position | From |
|---|---|---|---|---|---|---|
| 1988 | 1 | 8 | Rex Chapman | United States | Shooting guard | Kentucky |
| 1988 | 2 | 34 | Tom Tolbert | United States | Power forward/center | Arizona |
| 1988 | 3 | 58 | Jeff Moore | United States | Power forward/center | Auburn |
| 1989 | 1 | 5 | J. R. Reid | United States | Power forward | North Carolina |
| 1989 | 2 | 29 | Dyron Nix (traded to Indiana) (Note: On June 27, 1989, Charlotte traded the draft rights to Dyron Nix to the Indiana Pacers for Stuart Gray.) | United States | Power forward | Tennessee |
| 1990 | 1 | 5 | Kendall Gill | United States | Shooting guard | Illinois |
| 1990 | 2 | 39 | Steve Scheffler (from Houston) (Note: On July 18, 1988, Charlotte acquired Robert Reid and a 1990 second-round pick (No. 39 overall) from the Houston Rockets in exchange for Bernard Thompson.) | United States | Power forward/center | Purdue |
| 1991 | 1 | 1 | Larry Johnson | United States | Small forward/power forward | UNLV |
| 1991 | 2 | 28 | Kevin Lynch (from Denver) (Note: On September 11, 1989, Charlotte acquired a 1991 second-round pick (No. 28 overall) from the Denver Nuggets in exchange for Tim Kempton.) | United States | Small forward | Minnesota |
| 1992 | 1 | 2 | Alonzo Mourning | United States | Center | Georgetown |
| 1992 | 2 | 35 | Tony Bennett | United States | Point guard | Wisconsin–Green Bay |
| 1993 | 1 | 17 | Greg Graham (traded to Philadelphia) (Note: On September 3, 1993, Charlotte traded the draft rights to Greg Graham along with Dana Barros, Sidney Green, and a 1994 first-round pick (No. 11 overall) to the Philadelphia 76ers for Hersey Hawkins.) | United States | Shooting guard | Indiana |
| 1993 | 1 | 20 | Scott Burrell (from San Antonio) (Note: On December 9, 1992, Charlotte acquired Sidney Green, a 1993 first-round pick (No. 20 overall), and a 1996 second-round pick (No. 55 overall) from the San Antonio Spurs in exchange for J.R. Reid.) | United States | Small forward | Connecticut |
| 1994 | 2 | 38 | Darrin Hancock | United States | Shooting guard/small forward | Kansas |
| 1995 | 1 | 22 | George Zidek | Czech Republic | Center | UCLA |
| 1996 | 1 | 13 | Kobe Bryant (traded to L.A. Lakers) (Note: On July 11, 1996, Charlotte traded the draft rights to Kobe Bryant to the Los Angeles Lakers for Vlade Divac.) | United States | Shooting guard | Lower Merion (H.S.) |
| 1996 | 1 | 16 | Tony Delk (from Miami) (Note: On November 3, 1995, Charlotte traded Alonzo Mourning along with LeRon Ellis and Pete Myers to the Miami Heat for Glen Rice, Matt Geiger, Khalid Reeves, and a 1996 first-round pick (No. 16 overall pick).) | United States | Point guard/shooting guard | Kentucky |
| 1996 | 2 | 44 | Malik Rose | United States | Power forward | Drexel |
| 1998 | 1 | 21 | Ricky Davis | United States | Shooting guard/small forward | Iowa |
| 1998 | 2 | 50 | Andrew Betts (traded to Indiana) (Note: On July 12, 2006, Charlotte traded the draft rights to Andrew Betts to the Indiana Pacers for Peja Stojaković and cash considerations.) | United Kingdom | Center | Long Beach State |
| 1999 | 1 | 3 | Baron Davis | United States | Point guard | UCLA |
| 1999 | 2 | 43 | Lee Nailon | United States | Power forward | TCU |
| 2000 | 1 | 19 | Jamaal Magloire | Canada | Power forward/center | Kentucky |
| 2001 | 1 | 16 | Kirk Haston | United States | Power forward | Indiana |
| 2004 | 1 | 2 | Emeka Okafor (from L.A. Clippers) (Note: On June 21, 2004, Charlotte traded their first and second-round picks to the Los Angeles Clippers for their first-round pick and the right to select Predrag Drobnjak in the expansion draft.) | United States | Power forward/center | Connecticut |
| 2004 | 2 | 45 | Bernard Robinson (from Milwaukee) (Note: On June 23, 2004, Charlotte traded Zaza Pachulia to the Milwaukee Bucks in exchange for their second-round draft pick (No. 45 overall pick).) | United States | Power forward | Michigan |
| 2005 | 1 | 5 | Raymond Felton | United States | Point guard | North Carolina |
| 2005 | 1 | 13 | Sean May (from Cleveland via Phoenix) (Note: On June 22, 2004, Charlotte acquired a 2005 first-round pick (No. 13 overall pick) and cash considerations from the Phoenix Suns in exchange for selecting Jahidi White in the expansion draft. Previously, on October 1, 1997, Phoenix acquired a 2005 first-round draft pick from Cleveland in a three-team trade with Cleveland and Denver.) | United States | Power forward | North Carolina |
| 2006 | 1 | 3 | Adam Morrison | United States | Small forward | Gonzaga |
| 2006 | 2 | 50 | Ryan Hollins (from Sacramento) (Note: On August 2, 2005, Charlotte traded Jason Hart to the Sacramento Kings for their 2006 second-round draft pick.) | United States | Center | UCLA |
| 2007 | 1 | 8 | Brandan Wright (traded to Golden State) (Note: On June 28, 2007, Charlotte traded the rights to Brandan Wright to the Golden State Warriors for the rights to Jermareo Davidson and guard Jason Richardson.) | United States | Small forward | North Carolina |
| 2007 | 1 | 22 | Jared Dudley (from Cleveland) (Note: On June 22, 2004, Charlotte traded Sasha Pavlović to the Cleveland Cavaliers in exchange for their 2007 first-round draft pick.) | United States | Small forward | Boston College |
| 2008 | 1 | 9 | D. J. Augustin | United States | Point guard | Texas |
| 2008 | 1 | 20 | Alexis Ajinça (from Denver) (Note: On June 25, 2008, Charlotte acquired an additional 2008 first-round pick from the Denver Nuggets in exchange for a future protected first-round pick.) | France | Center | Hyères-Toulon (France) |
| 2008 | 2 | 38 | Kyle Weaver (traded to Oklahoma City) (Note: On August 11, 2008, Charlotte traded the draft rights to Kyle Weaver to the Oklahoma City Thunder in exchange for the New Jersey Nets' 2009 second-round draft pick. Previously, on July 7, 2006, Oklahoma City acquired a 2009 second-round draft pick from New Jersey in exchange for Mikki Moore.) | United States | Point guard | Washington State |
| 2009 | 1 | 12 | Gerald Henderson | United States | Shooting guard | Duke |
| 2009 | 2 | 40 | Derrick Brown (from New Jersey via Oklahoma City) | United States | Power forward | Xavier |
| 2009 | 2 | 54 | Robert Vaden (from San Antonio, (Note: On February 13, 2007, Charlotte acquired a 2009 second-round draft pick, Eric Williams and cash considerations from the San Antonio Spurs in exchange for Melvin Ely.) traded to Oklahoma City) (Note: On June 25, 2009, Charlotte traded the rights to Robert Vaden to the Oklahoma City Thunder for cash considerations.) | United States | Shooting guard | UAB |
| 2011 | 1 | 9 | Kemba Walker | United States | Point guard | Connecticut |
| 2011 | 1 | 19 | Tobias Harris (from New Orleans via Portland, (Note: On February 23, 2011, Charlotte acquired Joel Przybilla, Dante Cunningham, Sean Marks, New Orleans' 2011 first-round draft pick (No. 19 overall pick), Portland's 2014 first-round draft pick (No. 24 overall pick) and cash considerations from the Portland Trail Blazers in exchange for Gerald Wallace. Previously, on October 23, 2010, the Blazers acquired a 2011 first-round draft pick from the New Orleans Hornets in exchange for Jerryd Bayless.) traded to Milwaukee) (Note: On June 23, 2011, Charlotte traded the rights to Tobias Harris along with Stephen Jackson to the Milwaukee Bucks as part of a three-team trade which resulted in the acquisition of Corey Maggette and the rights to Bismack Biyombo.) | United States | Small forward | Tennessee |
| 2011 | 2 | 39 | Jeremy Tyler (traded to Golden State) (Note: On June 23, 2011, Charlotte traded the rights to Jeremy Tyler to the Golden State Warriors in exchange for cash considerations.) | United States | Center | Tokyo Apache (Japan) |
| 2012 | 1 | 2 | Michael Kidd-Gilchrist | United States | Small forward | Kentucky |
| 2012 | 2 | 31 | Jeffery Taylor | Sweden | Small forward | Vanderbilt |
| 2013 | 1 | 4 | Cody Zeller | United States | Power forward/center | Indiana |
| 2014 | 1 | 9 | Noah Vonleh (from Detroit) (Note: On June 26, 2012, Charlotte acquired Ben Gordon and a 2014 first-round pick from Detroit for Corey Maggette.) | United States | Power forward | Indiana |
| 2014 | 1 | 24 | Shabazz Napier (from Portland, traded to Miami) (Note: On June 26, 2014, Charlotte traded the draft rights the draft rights to 24th pick Shabazz Napier to the Miami Heat for 26th pick P. J. Hairston and to 55th pick Semaj Christon, a 2019 second-round pick and cash considerations.) | United States | Point guard | Connecticut |
| 2014 | 2 | 45 | Dwight Powell (traded to Cleveland) (Note: On July 12, 2014, Charlotte traded the draft rights to Dwight Powell, along with Brendan Haywood, to the Cleveland Cavaliers in exchange for Scotty Hopson and cash considerations.) | Canada | Power forward | Stanford |
| 2015 | 1 | 9 | Frank Kaminsky | United States | Power forward/center | Wisconsin |
| 2015 | 2 | 39 | Juan Pablo Vaulet (traded to Brooklyn) (Note: Charlotte traded the draft rights to 39th pick Juan Pablo Vaulet to the Brooklyn Nets for a 2018 second-round pick, a 2019 second-round pick, and cash considerations.) | Argentina | Small forward | Estudiantes de Bahía Blanca (Argentina) |
| 2016 | 1 | 22 | Malachi Richardson (traded to Sacramento) (Note: On June 23, 2016, Charlotte traded the draft rights to Malachi Richardson to the Sacramento Kings for guard Marco Belinelli.) | United States | Shooting guard | Syracuse |
| 2017 | 1 | 11 | Malik Monk | United States | Shooting guard | Kentucky |
| 2017 | 2 | 31 | Frank Jackson (from Brooklyn via Atlanta, (Note: On June 20, 2017, Charlotte acquired Dwight Howard and the draft rights to Frank Jackson from the Atlanta Hawks for Marco Belinelli, Miles Plumlee, and the draft rights to Tyler Dorsey. Previously, on July 11, 2012, the Brooklyn Nets acquired Joe Johnson from Atlanta for DeShawn Stevenson, Johan Petro, Jordan Farmar, Anthony Morrow, Jordan Williams, Houston Rockets' 2013 first-round pick, and Brooklyn's 2017 second-round pick.) traded to New Orleans) (Note: On June 22, 2017, New Orleans acquired the rights to Jackson from Charlotte for the Pelicans' rights to Dwayne Bacon and cash considerations.) | United States | Point guard | Duke |
| 2018 | 1 | 11 | Shai Gilgeous-Alexander (traded to the L. A. Clippers) (Note: On June 21, 2018, the Los Angeles Clippers acquired the draft rights to Shai Gilgeous-Alexander from Charlotte in exchange for the Clippers' draft rights to Miles Bridges and two future second round selections.) | Canada | Point guard | Kentucky |
| 2018 | 2 | 55 | Arnoldas Kulboka (from Cleveland via Brooklyn and Philadelphia) (Note: On September 27, 2014, the Philadelphia 76ers acquired Keith Bogans and a 2018 second-round pick from the Cleveland Cavaliers in exchange for a conditional 2015 second-round pick that ultimately wasn't conveyed.) (Note: On December 11, 2014, the Brooklyn Nets acquired Brandon Davies and the Cleveland Cavaliers' 2018 second-round pick from the Philadelphia 76ers in exchange for Andrei Kirilenko, Jorge Gutiérrez, the right to swap 2018 second-round picks between Cleveland and Brooklyn, a 2020 second-round pick, and cash considerations.) (Note: On June 25, 2015, the Charlotte Hornets acquired the least valuable 2018 second-round pick between Brooklyn and Cleveland, a 2019 second-round pick, and cash considerations from the Brooklyn Nets in exchange for the draft rights to Juan Pablo Vaulet.) | Lithuania | Small forward | Orlandina Basket (Italy) |
| 2019 | 1 | 12 | P. J. Washington | United States | Power forward | Kentucky |
| 2019 | 2 | 36 | Cody Martin (from Washington via Atlanta, Denver, and Orlando) (Note: June 26, 2015: Washington Wizards to Atlanta Hawks (three-team trade with New York): Atlanta acquired Tim Hardaway Jr., a 2016 second-right pick, and a 2019 second-round pick; Washington acquired the draft rights to Kelly Oubre Jr.; New York acquired the draft rights to Jerian Grant; July 6, 2017: Atlanta Hawks to Denver Nuggets (three-team trade with L.A. Clippers): Denver acquired a 2019 second-round pick; Atlanta acquired Jamal Crawford, Diamond Stone, and Los Angeles' 2018 protected first-round pick; Los Angeles Clippers acquired Danilo Gallinari; July 21, 2018: Denver Nuggets to Orlando Magic: Orlando acquired the draft rights to Justin Jackson and a 2019 second-round pick; Denver acquired the draft rights to Jarred Vanderbilt; July 7, 2018: Orlando Magic to Charlotte Hornets (three-team trade with Chicago): Charlotte acquired Bismack Biyombo, a 2019 second-round pick, and a 2020 second-round pick; Orlando acquired Timofey Mozgov and Jerian Grant; Chicago acquired Julyan Stone) | United States | Small forward | Nevada |
| 2019 | 2 | 52 | Jalen McDaniels (from Oklahoma City) (Note: July 6, 2018: Oklahoma City Thunder to Charlotte Hornets: Charlotte acquired a 2019 second-round pick and cash considerations; Oklahoma City acquired the draft rights to Hamidou Diallo) | United States | Power forward | San Diego State |
| 2020 | 1 | 3 | LaMelo Ball | United States | Point guard | Illawarra Hawks (Australia) |
| 2020 | 2 | 32 | Vernon Carey Jr. (from Cleveland via Portland, Orlando, and L. A. Clippers) | United States | Power forward | Duke |
| 2020 | 2 | 56 | Grant Riller (from Boston) | United States | Shooting guard | College of Charleston |
| 2021 | 1 | 11 | James Bouknight | United States | Shooting guard | Connecticut |
| 2021 | 2 | 56 | Scottie Lewis (from LA Clippers) | United States | Shooting guard | Florida |
| 2021 | 2 | 57 | Balša Koprivica (from Brooklyn) | Serbia | Center | Florida State |
| 2022 | 1 | 13 | Jalen Duren (traded to Detroit) | United States | Center | Memphis |
| 2022 | 1 | 15 | Mark Williams | United States | Center | Duke |
| 2023 | 1 | 2 | Brandon Miller | United States | Small Forward | Alabama |
| 2024 | 1 | 6 | Tidjane Salaün | France | Small Forward | France |
| 2024 | 2 | 42 | KJ Simpson | United States | Point Guard | Colorado |
| 2025 | 1 | 4 | Kon Knueppel | United States | Small Forward | Duke |
| 2025 | 2 | 33 | Sion James | United States | Shooting Guard | Duke |
| 2025 | 2 | 34 | Ryan Kalkbrenner | United States | Center | Creighton |
| 2026 | 1 | 14 | Hannes Steinbach | Germany | Power Forward | Washington |
| 2026 | 1 | 18 | Christian Anderson Jr. | United States | Guard | Texas Tech |
