= Keith Hornsby =

American basketball player (born 1992)

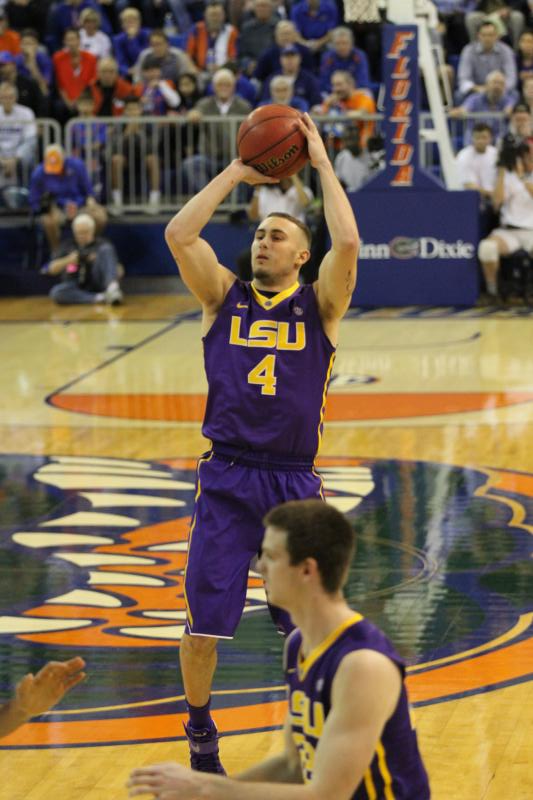
- Hornsby playing for LSU

Personal information
- Born: January 30, 1992 (age 34) Williamsburg, Virginia, U.S.
- Listed height: 6 ft 3 in (1.91 m)
- Listed weight: 210 lb (95 kg)

Career information
- High school: Hampton Roads Academy (Newport News, Virginia); Oak Hill Academy (Mouth of Wilson, Virginia)
- College: UNC Asheville (2011–2013); LSU (2014–2016)
- NBA draft: 2016: undrafted
- Playing career: 2016–2024
- Position: Shooting guard
- Number: 4, 3, 5

Career history
- 2016–2019: Texas Legends
- 2019–2020: Twarde Pierniki Toruń
- 2020–2021: EWE Baskets Oldenburg
- 2021–2022: Metropolitans 92
- 2022–2023: Nanterre 92
- 2023–2024: Rytas Vilnius
- 2024: Surne Bilbao Basket

Career highlights
- 3× NBA G League All-Star (2017–2019)
- Stats at Basketball Reference

Keith Randall Hornsby (born January 30, 1992) is an American former professional basketball player. He played college basketball for UNC Asheville and LSU.

== High school career ==
Hornsby began his prep career at Hampton Roads Academy before transferring to Oak Hill Academy. As a senior, he averaged 11.4 points, two assists and three rebounds and led the Warriors in three-point shooting at 50.4 percent, helping them finish with a 29–4 overall record and to be ranked fourth nationally.

== College career ==
Hornsby played his first two years of college basketball at UNC Asheville where he averaged 15.0 points, 4.2 rebounds and 3.1 assists per game, while shooting 37.9 percent from three-point range as a sophomore. As a junior, he transferred to LSU, starting in 52 of 53 games and finished with averages of 13.3 points, 3.7 rebounds and 1.9 assists in 33.6 minutes. In his senior season, he averaged 13.1 points, second on the team to Ben Simmons, before suffering a season-ending abdominal injury that required surgery.

== Professional career ==
=== Texas Legends (2016–2019) ===
After going undrafted in the 2016 NBA draft, Hornsby signed with the Dallas Mavericks on July 27, 2016, but was waived on October 22 after appearing in five preseason games. On October 30, 2016, Hornsby was selected by the Texas Legends with the ninth overall pick in the 2016 NBA Development League Draft. In his first season, he averaged 4.5 points, 2.0 rebounds, and 1.0 assist per game. Hornsby averaged 10.1 points, 3.0 rebounds, 1.6 assists, and 1.2 steals per game in the 2017–18 season. In the 2018–19 NBA G League season, Hornsby led the league in three-point field goal percentage at 48.5%, while averaging 12.3 points, 2.7 assists, 1.5 rebounds and 1.0 steals per game.

=== Toruń (2019–2020) ===
On September 2, 2019, after three years in the G League, Hornsby went overseas for the first time in his career and signed with Polish club Twarde Pierniki Toruń. He averaged 16 points and 3 assists per game.

=== EWE Baskets Oldenburg (2020–2021) ===
On July 4, 2020, he signed with EWE Baskets Oldenburg of the Basketball Bundesliga (BBL).

=== Metropolitans 92 (2021–2022) ===
On July 7, 2021, he signed a one-year deal with the French team Metropolitans 92 of the LNB Pro A.

=== Nanterre 92 (2022–2023) ===
On July 29, 2022, Hornsby signed with Nanterre 92 of the LNB Pro A.

=== Rytas Vilnius (2023–2024) ===
On August 26, 2023, he signed with Rytas Vilnius of the Lithuanian Basketball League (LKL).

=== Bilbao Basket (2024) ===
On January 14, 2024, Hornsby signed with Surne Bilbao Basket of the Liga ACB.

== Personal life ==
He is the son of musician Bruce Hornsby and Kathy Hornsby and has a twin brother named Russell. He graduated with a degree in communication studies.
