= Balša Koprivica =

Serbian basketball player (born 2000)

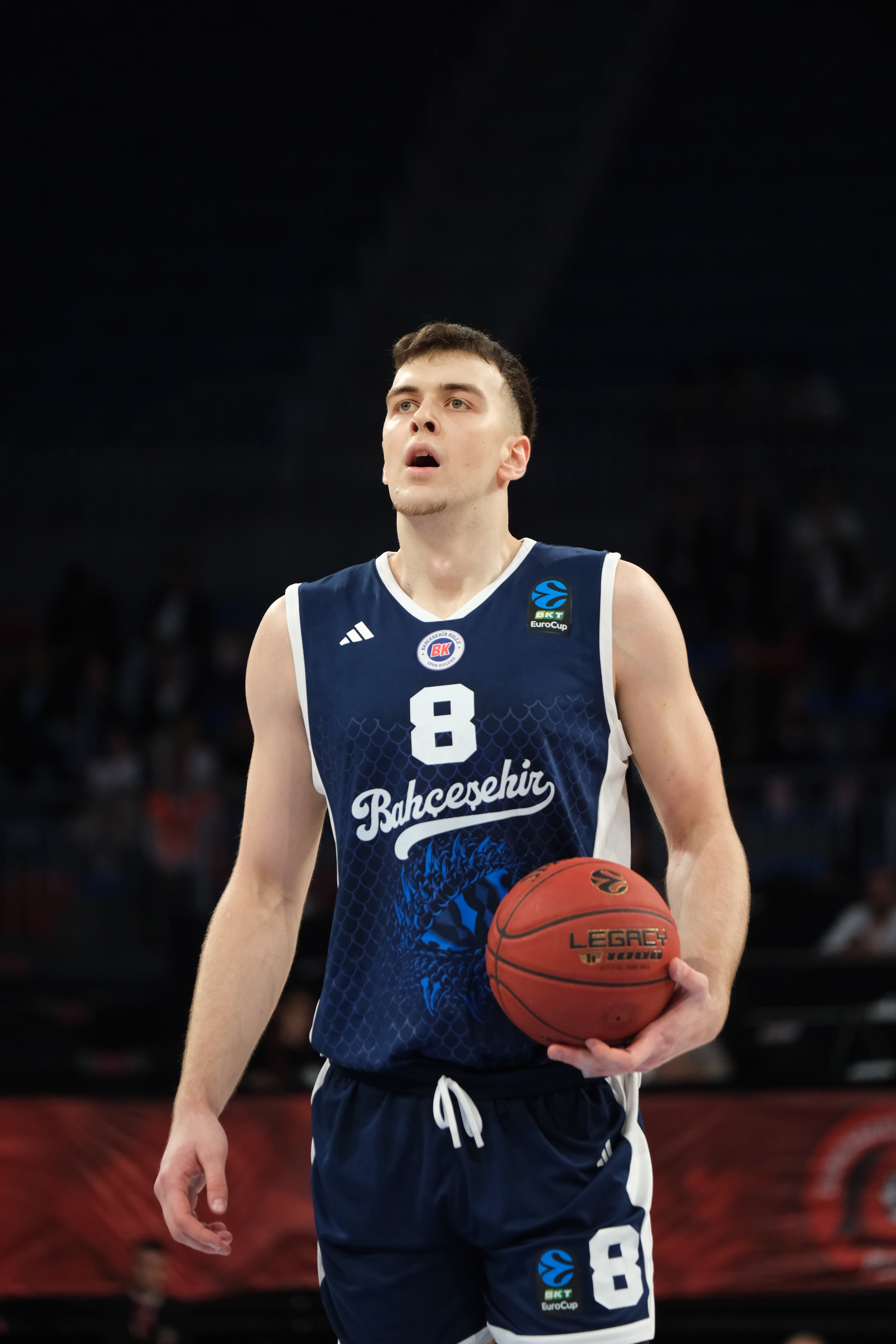
- Koprivica with Bahçeşehir Koleji in 2025

No. 7 – San Pablo Burgos
- Position: Center
- League: Liga ACB; EuroCup

Personal information
- Born: 1 May 2000 (age 26) Belgrade, Serbia, FR Yugoslavia
- Listed height: 7 ft 1 in (2.16 m)
- Listed weight: 250 lb (113 kg)

Career information
- High school: NSU University School (Fort Lauderdale, Florida); Windermere Prep (Windermere, Florida); Montverde Academy (Montverde, Florida)
- College: Florida State (2019–2021)
- NBA draft: 2021: 2nd round, 57th overall pick
- Drafted by: Charlotte Hornets
- Playing career: 2021–present

Career history
- 2021–2025: Partizan
- 2025–2026: Bahçeşehir Koleji
- 2026–present: San Pablo Burgos

Career highlights
- 2× ABA League champion (2023, 2025); Serbian League champion (2025)
- Stats at Basketball Reference
Medals
Men's basketball
Representing Serbia
FIBA U18 European Championship
Gold medal – first place	2017 Slovakia	Team

Balša Koprivica (Serbian Cyrillic: Балша Копривица; born 1 May 2000) is a Serbian professional basketball player for San Pablo Burgos of the Spanish Liga ACB and the EuroCup. He played college basketball for the Florida State Seminoles. He also represents the Serbia national team.

== Early life ==
Koprivica was born in Belgrade to Slaviša Koprivica and Tanja Čavić. Slaviša, who stands 6-foot-9 (2.06 m), is a former Serbian professional basketball player who won the 1992 EuroLeague with Partizan. Koprivica moved to Florida, United States in 2012. In February 2017, he joined the Basketball Without Borders Global Camp in New Orleans.

== High school career ==
Koprivica began playing high school basketball in 2015 with University School of Nova Southeastern University in Fort Lauderdale, Broward County, Florida. He played at the 2015 Battle at The Villages high school tournament. In July 2017, he transferred to Windermere Preparatory School in Lake Butler, Orange County, Florida.

He was considered one of the top ten college recruits in the class of 2019 until he dropped to a four-star recruit during his senior year.

In December 2017, he transferred to Montverde Academy in Montverde, Florida.

=== Recruiting ===
On 26 October 2018, he committed to Florida State University.

College recruiting
Name	Hometown	School	Height	Weight	Commit date
Balša Koprivica; C	Belgrade, Serbia	Montverde Academy (FL)	7 ft 0 in (2.13 m)	230 lb (100 kg)	Oct 26, 2018
Balša Koprivica; C	Recruit ratings: Rivals: 247Sports: ESPN: (88)				
Overall recruit ranking: Rivals: 88 247Sports: 93 ESPN: 51
Note: In many cases, Scout, Rivals, 247Sports, On3, and ESPN may conflict in their listings of height and weight.; In these cases, the average was taken. ESPN grades are on a 100-point scale.; Sources: "Florida State 2019 Basketball Commitments". Rivals.; "2019 Florida State Seminoles Recruiting Class". ESPN.; "2019 Team Ranking". Rivals.

== College career ==
Koprivica played his freshman and sophomore year with the Florida State Seminoles. As a freshman, he averaged 4.7 points and 2.4 rebounds per game. As a sophomore, he averaged 9.1 points, 5.6 rebounds, and 1.4 blocks per game.

On 13 April 2021, Koprivica declared for the 2021 NBA draft, forgoing his remaining college eligibility.

== Professional career ==
=== Partizan (2021–2025) ===
On August 23, 2021, Koprivica officially signed a three-year deal with his hometown and his father's former club Partizan Mozzart Bet, under head coach Željko Obradović. His father was coached by Obradović, who played for Partizan (1991–1993). In his debut season with the club, Koprivica averaged 5.2 points and 3.9 rebounds over 33 ABA League games, but Partizan failed to lift any trophy.

In 2022–23 season, his second with the club, Koprivica had his role reduced, appearing in only six EuroLeague games, but managed to lift the ABA League title with averages of 4.3 points and 3.3 rebounds over 12 games played. Over 2023–23, his role improved slightly, as he averaged 3.3 points and 1.7 rebounds over 14 EuroLeague games. The season was deemed to be unsuccessful for Partizan as they finished the season without lifting any trophy. During the 2024–25 season, Partizan managed to lift the record eighth ABA League championship, and the Serbian League championship, the first one after 11 seasons.

=== Bahçeşehir Koleji (2025–2026) ===
On June 27, 2025, he signed with Bahçeşehir Koleji of the Turkish Basketbol Süper Ligi (BSL). Over 15 games in the Turkish League, Koprivica averaged 5.7 points and 3.5 rebounds on 63.5% shooting from the field; with similar stats in the EuroCup.

=== San Pablo Burgos (2026–present) ===
On August 3, 2026, he signed with San Pablo Burgos of the Liga ACB and the EuroCup.

==== NBA draft rights ====
Koprivica was selected with the 57th overall pick by the Charlotte Hornets in the 2021 NBA draft and traded to the Detroit Pistons for Mason Plumlee and JT Thor, the 37th overall pick of the 2021 draft. In August 2021, he joined the Pistons for the NBA Summer League. On August 11, he made his debut in the Summer League in a 111–91 loss to the Houston Rockets in which he posted 2 points and a rebound in 4 minutes.

Koprivica joined the Pistons for the 2022 NBA Summer League.

On June 30, 2023, the Pistons traded the draft rights to Koprivica to the Los Angeles Clippers for sum of $2.1 million.

On July 18, 2024, the draft rights for Koprivica were traded from the Clippers to the Utah Jazz as part of a deal centering on Russell Westbrook and Kris Dunn. On February 4, 2026, Koprivica's draft rights were traded to the Oklahoma City Thunder.

== National team career ==
Koprivica was a member of the Serbian U-18 national basketball team that won gold medal at the 2017 FIBA Europe Under-18 Championship, with Marko Pecarski as teammate. Thirty years earlier, their respective fathers Slaviša Koprivica and Miroslav Pecarski had played together for the Yugoslavia under-19 national team, winning gold at the 1987 FIBA Under-19 World Championship.

== Career statistics ==
Legend
GP	Games played	GS	Games started	MPG	Minutes per game
FG%	Field-goal percentage	3P%	3-point field-goal percentage	FT%	Free-throw percentage
RPG	Rebounds per game	APG	Assists per game	SPG	Steals per game
BPG	Blocks per game	PPG	Points per game	PIR	Performance index rating
**Bold**	Career high

=== EuroLeague ===
*	Led the league

Year	Team	GP	GS	MPG	FG%	3P%	FT%	RPG	APG	SPG	BPG	PPG	PIR
2022–23	Partizan	6	1	4.4	.500	.000	.000	1.3	.2	.0	.2	1.0	.7
2023–24	Partizan	14	2	**8.3**	**.833***	.000	**1.000**	1.7	**.3**	.2	**.6**	3.3	3.9
2024–25	Partizan	**16**	**8**	8.1	.600	.000	.800	**2.4**	**.3**	**.4**	**.6**	**3.4**	**4.1**
Career		36	11	7.5	.677	.000	.818	2.0	.3	.3	.5	2.9	3.4

=== EuroCup ===
Year	Team	GP	GS	MPG	FG%	3P%	FT%	RPG	APG	SPG	BPG	PPG	PIR
2021–22	Partizan	17	10	16.1	.632	—	.600	5.5	.8	.5	1.2	6.4	10.1
Career		17	10	16.1	.632	—	.600	5.5	.8	.5	1.2	6.4	10.1

=== Domestic leagues ===
Year	Team	League	GP	MPG	FG%	3P%	FT%	RPG	APG	SPG	BPG	PPG
2021–22	(Serbia) Partizan	ABA	33	13.6	.635	—	.587	3.9	.7	.4	.8	5.2
2022–23	(Serbia) Partizan	ABA	12	11.4	.636	—	.750	3.3	.6	.4	1.1	4.2
2023–24	(Serbia) Partizan	ABA	25	14.6	.647	—	.644	4.6	.6	.4	1.3	8.2

=== College ===
Year	Team	GP	GS	MPG	FG%	3P%	FT%	RPG	APG	SPG	BPG	PPG
2019–20	Florida State	**27**	0	10.3	**.699**	–	.658	2.4	.3	**.3**	.3	4.7
2020–21	Florida State	24	**20**	**19.5**	.599	**1.000**	**.689**	**5.6**	**.8**	**.3**	**1.4**	**9.1**
Career		51	20	14.6	.632	1.000	.677	3.9	.5	.3	.8	6.8

== See also ==
- List of NBA drafted players from Serbia
- Charlotte Hornets draft history
