= Gregor Glas =

Slovenian basketball player (born 2001)

No. 7 – Bàsquet Girona
- Position: Shooting guard
- League: Liga ACB; Europe Cup

Personal information
- Born: April 29, 2001 (age 25) Krško, Slovenia
- Listed height: 1.97 m (6 ft 6 in)
- Listed weight: 81 kg (179 lb)

Career information
- Playing career: 2016–present

Career history
- 2016–2019: Sixt Primorska
- 2019–2021: Dynamic VIP PAY
- 2021–2023: Partizan
- 2023–2025: Cedevita Olimpija
- 2023: →Mornar Bar
- 2025–2026: Vienna
- 2026: Samobor
- 2026–present: Girona

Career highlights
- 3× Slovenian League champion (2019, 2024, 2025); ABA League 2 champion (2019); 4× Slovenian Cup winner (2018, 2019, 2024, 2025)
Medals
Men's basketball
Representing Slovenia
FIBA U18 European Championship
| Bronze medal – third place | 2019 Greece | Team |

Gregor Glas (born 29 April 2001) is a Slovenian professional basketball player who last played for Girona of the Liga ACB and the Europe Cup. He is a 1.97 m tall shooting guard.

== Professional career ==
Glas started playing professional basketball for Primorska. In August 2018, he attended the Basketball Without Borders Europe camp in Belgrade, Serbia.

On October 24, 2019, he signed with Serbian club Dynamic VIP PAY. Following the 2020–21 season Glas declared for the 2021 NBA draft. On July 19, 2021, he withdrawn his name from consideration for the 2021 NBA draft.

On September 26, 2021, he signed with Serbian powerhouse KK Partizan.

On August 26, 2025, he signed with Vienna of the ABA League.

On October 21, 2026, he signed with Bàsquet Girona of the Liga ACB and the Europe Cup.

== International career ==
Glas made his debut for the Slovenian national team on September 14, 2018, at the 2019 FIBA Basketball World Cup qualification game against Latvia national team. Glas thereby became the youngest player to ever play for Slovenia on a senior level.
